= Malaysian Chinese =

Malaysian citizens of Chinese ethnicity

马来西亚华人 / 馬來西亞華人 Orang Cina Malaysia
- The Tow Boh Keong Temple in Penang, Malaysia during Chinese New Year

Total population
- Han Chinese ethnicity 6,892,367 (2020 census); 23.2% of Malaysian citizens

Regions with significant populations
- Malaysia
- Selangor: 1,756,181
- Johor: 1,208,652
- Kuala Lumpur: 737,161
- Penang: 718,362
- Perak: 643,627

Languages
- Predominantly; Mandarin (lingua franca); Minority; Malay and English as medium of communication in schools and government Mother Tongue languages: Hokkien, Cantonese, Hakka, Teochew, Fuzhou, Hainanese, Taishanese and Henghua; Manglish (creole)

Religion
- Predominantly; Mahāyāna Buddhism • Taoism (Chinese folk religion); Significant minority Christianity; Minority; Islam • Non-religious • other religions

Related ethnic groups
- Han Chinese; Bruneian Chinese · Singaporean Chinese · Indonesian Chinese · Chinese Filipinos · Thai Chinese · Peranakans · Sino-Natives · Overseas Chinese

Malaysian Chinese
- Malaysian Chinese in Simplified Chinese (top) and Traditional Chinese (below) character
- Traditional Chinese: 馬來西亞華人
- Simplified Chinese: 马来西亚华人
Transcriptions
Standard Mandarin
- Hanyu Pinyin: Mǎ lái xī yà Huá rén
- Wade–Giles: Ma3lai2xi1ya4 Hua2ren2
- Tongyong Pinyin: Ma3lai2xi1ya4 Hua2ren2
Yue: Cantonese
- Yale Romanization: Máhlòihsāia Wàhyàhn
- Jyutping: Maa5 loi4 sai1 aa3 Waa4 jan4
Southern Min
- Hokkien POJ: Má-lâi-se-a Hôa-jîn

Alternative Chinese name
- Traditional Chinese: 馬來西亞華裔
- Simplified Chinese: 马来西亚华裔
Transcriptions
Standard Mandarin
- Hanyu Pinyin: mǎ lái xī yà huá yì
- Wade–Giles: Ma3lai2xi1ya4 Hua2yi4
- Tongyong Pinyin: Ma3lai2xi1ya4 Hua2yi4
Yue: Cantonese
- Yale Romanization: Ma3lai2xi1ya4 Hua2yi4

Malaysian Chinese or Chinese Malaysians are Malaysian citizens of Chinese ethnicity. They form the second-largest ethnic group in Malaysia, after the Malay-majority, and as of 2020, constituted 23.2% of the country's citizens or close to 7 million. In addition, Malaysian Chinese make up the second-largest community of overseas Chinese in the world, following the Thai Chinese in neighbouring Thailand. (Note: While Singapore, Malaysia's other neighbour, has an ethnic Chinese majority resident population, they are numerically smaller at close to 2.7 million as of the 2020 census.) Prior to 1963, the ethnic Chinese community were often referred to as the Malayan Chinese. As with most Chinese communities in Southeast Asia, they have maintained a significant and substantial presence in the economy of the modern-day country for at least two centuries since the era of British Malaya.

Most Malaysian Chinese are descendants of Southern Chinese immigrants who arrived in Malaysia between the early 19th and the mid-20th centuries before the country attained independence from British colonial rule. The majority originate from Fujian or the Lingnan region (modern-day Guangdong, Guangxi and Hainan). They belong to diverse linguistic subgroups speaking Chinese such as the Hokkien and Fuzhou from Fujian, the Teochew, Cantonese, Hakka from Guangdong, the Hainanese from Hainan and Kwongsai from Guangxi. An earlier wave of Chinese migrants, arriving between the 13th and 17th centuries, assimilated significant aspects of indigenous Malay culture and customs to forge distinct identities. These groups include the Peranakans (or Baba–Nyonya) of Kelantan, Malacca, Penang and Terengganu and the Sino-Natives of Sabah. Characterised by a high degree of intermarriage with native populations, these communities has preserved unique culture and traditions that distinguish them from the broader Malaysian Chinese population.

Most Malaysian Chinese have maintained their Chinese heritage, identity, culture and language. The Malay-majority government do not classify them as part of the bumiputera, a preferential status in the country. Various socioeconomic factors, including divergent fertility rates, migration trends and shifting policy dynamics, have led to a gradual decline in the Chinese population's relative share since 1957.

== Names ==
The Malaysian Chinese are referred to as simply "Chinese" in Malaysian English, Orang Cina in Malay, Sina or Kina among indigenous groups in Borneo, Cīṉar (சீனர்) in Tamil, Huárén (华人; 華人; 'Chinese people') or Huáqiáo (华侨; 華僑; 'overseas Chinese') or Huáyì (华裔; 華裔; 'ethnic Chinese') in Mandarin, Tn̂g-lâng (唐侬; 唐儂; 'Tang-dynasty people') in Hokkien, and Wàhyàhn (华人; 華人; 'Chinese people') in Cantonese.

== History ==
=== Early history ===
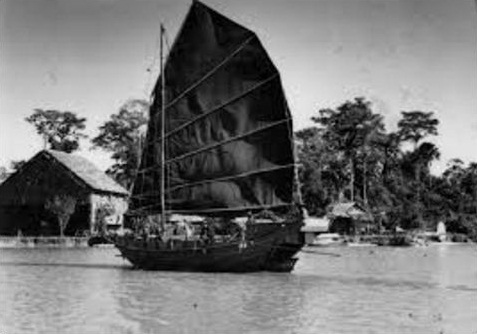
A Chinese junk in the Kinabatangan District of northern Borneo, photographed by Martin Johnson c. 1935

China and other early kingdoms in the Malay Archipelago, such as the northern area of the Malay Peninsula and Po-Ni in western Borneo, have long been connected. The first recorded movement of people from China into present-day Malaysia was the 1292 arrival of Mongol expeditionary forces under Kublai Khan in Borneo in 1292 in preparation for their invasion of Java the following year. Many of Khan's Chinese followers settled on the island with Chinese traders after the campaign, establishing an enclave along the Kinabatangan River. Their arrival was welcomed by the indigenous people, who benefited from the jars, beads, silk, and pottery brought to the island by the Chinese.

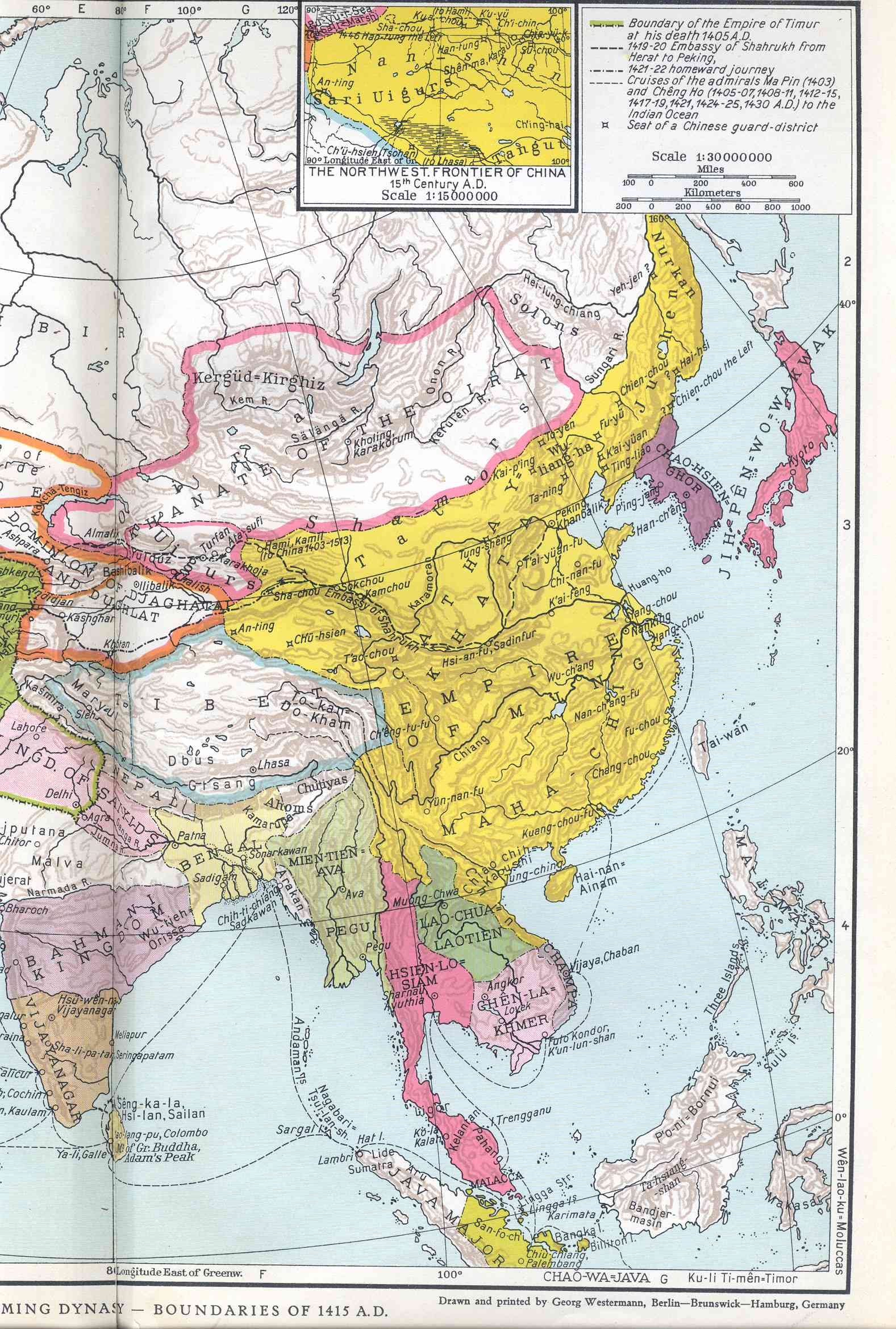
Map of the Ming dynasty under the Yongle Emperor in 1415

Chinese explorer and sailor Zheng He commanded several expeditions to south-east Asia between 1405 and 1430; during his third voyage, Zheng also visited Malacca. His companion and translator, Ma Huan, described Malacca in his Yingya Shenglan. Formerly part of Thailand, Malacca was founded after convoys from the Ming Dynasty developed a city and the area's chief was crowned king. During his fourth imperial-fleet visit, Ma wrote that the local king had just converted to Islam and dressed like an Arab. The last edition of Mingshi, one of the official Chinese Twenty-Four Histories, mentioned a pre-established Chinese settlement in the area. Mentions in other records exist, especially after trade contacts were established with the Nanyang region. According to Hai Yü (Words about the Sea), written by Huang Zhong and published in 1537, the lifestyle of the Chinese community in Malacca differed from that of the local Malays.

This close relationship was maintained during the Islamisation of the Malacca and Brunei kingdoms, whose thalassocracy once covered much of present-day Malaysia. Both the Muslim sultanates pledged protection to the Chinese dynasties from further conquest by the neighbouring Javanese Majapahit or the Siamese Ayutthaya. This relationship resulted in interethnic marriage between the sultanate's royal family and the Chinese envoy and representatives. Zheng He's arrival encouraged the spread of Islam in the Malay Archipelago and aided the growth of the Chinese Muslim population from the Eastern Chinese coastal towns of Fujian and Canton, with many of their traders arriving in the coastal towns of present-day Malaysia and Indonesia by the early 15th century. In addition to the early settlements in Kinabatangan and Malacca, two more old Chinese settlements are located in Terengganu and the Penang Island as part of trade networks with their respective areas.

=== Colonial era (1500–1900) ===
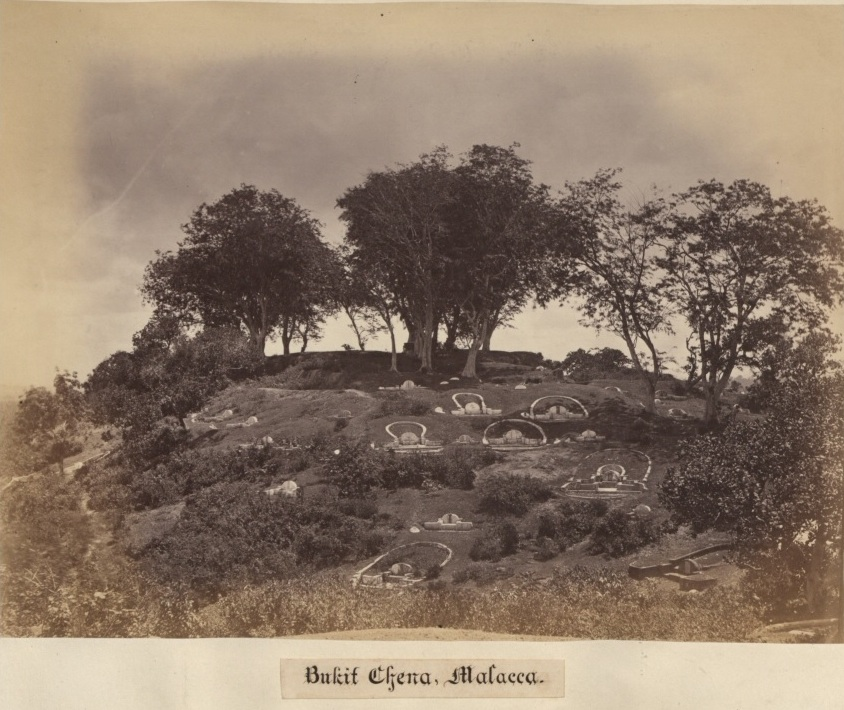
1860–1900 photograph of Bukit Cina (Chinese Hill) in Malacca, one of Malaysia's oldest Chinese cemeteries

Although many Chinese traders avoided Portuguese Malacca after its 1511 conquest, the flow of emigrants from China continued. The Zhengde Emperor retaliated against the Portuguese for their activities in Malacca during the Ming dynasty after the arrival of their fleet in Canton. The Chinese emperor was reluctant to help the deposed Malaccan ruler reclaim his position, however, since the dynasty's foreign policy was changing to maintain friendly relations with the Portuguese.

His successor, the Jiajing Emperor, changed the attitude of the Ming court by executing two government officials and reaffirming the importance of Malaccan issues in major policy decisions. Some Chinese, including those from Fujian (defying Ming-Dynasty regulation for the sake of trade), informed the Portuguese of the trade route between Guangdong and Siam. Since the local Malaccan Chinese were not treated favourably by the Portuguese, they and most overseas Chinese refused to cooperate with them. Through the Portuguese administration in Malacca, Chinese Muslims sided with other Islamic traders against the latter by providing ships and human capital. Negotiations were later held in Guangdong between Chinese officials and Portuguese envoys about Malaccan issues, with Malacca remaining under Portuguese control.

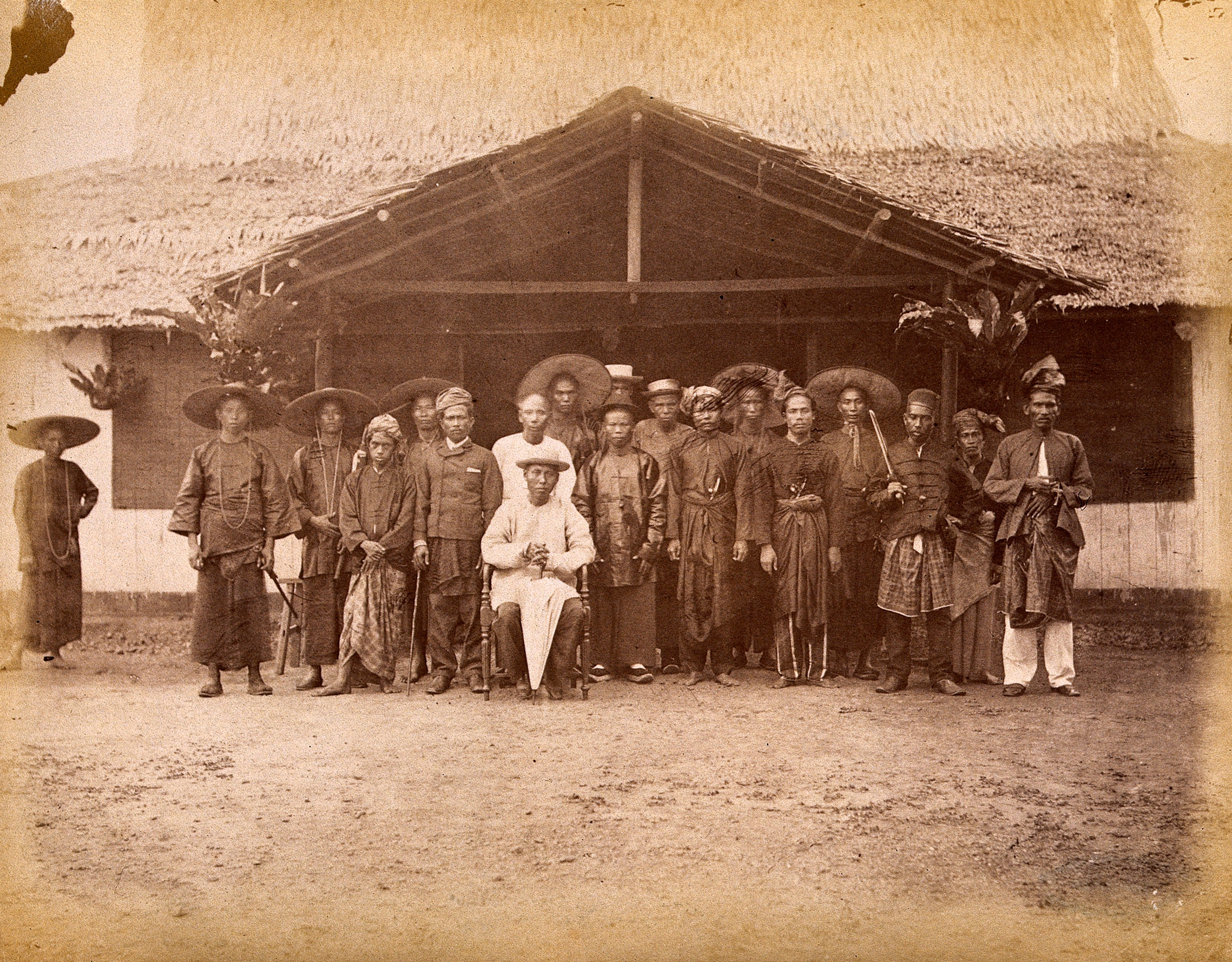
The Hai San Secret Society's "Captain China" with his followers in Selangor, June 1874

After the 1641 Dutch takeover of Malacca, many local Malaccan Chinese were hired to construct Dutch buildings. The Dutch found the Chinese industrious, and encouraged their participation in the colony's economic life; the Dutch also established a settlement in Perak in 1650 through an earlier treaty with Aceh and suggested that Alauddin, the 17th Sultan of Perak, allow the Chinese to develop tin mines. This facilitated Alauddin's plan to request more Chinese workers from Malacca, and the sultan promised to punish any official guilty of mistreating the Chinese.

With the sultan's consent, the Chinese played a leading role in the tin-mining industry. The Fourth Anglo-Dutch War in 1780 adversely affected the tin trade, however, and many Chinese miners left. Early Chinese settlements in Malacca and several areas along the archipelago's coasts notwithstanding, most mass Chinese migration to Malaysia occurred after the founding of British settlements in Malaya and Borneo during the early 19th century.

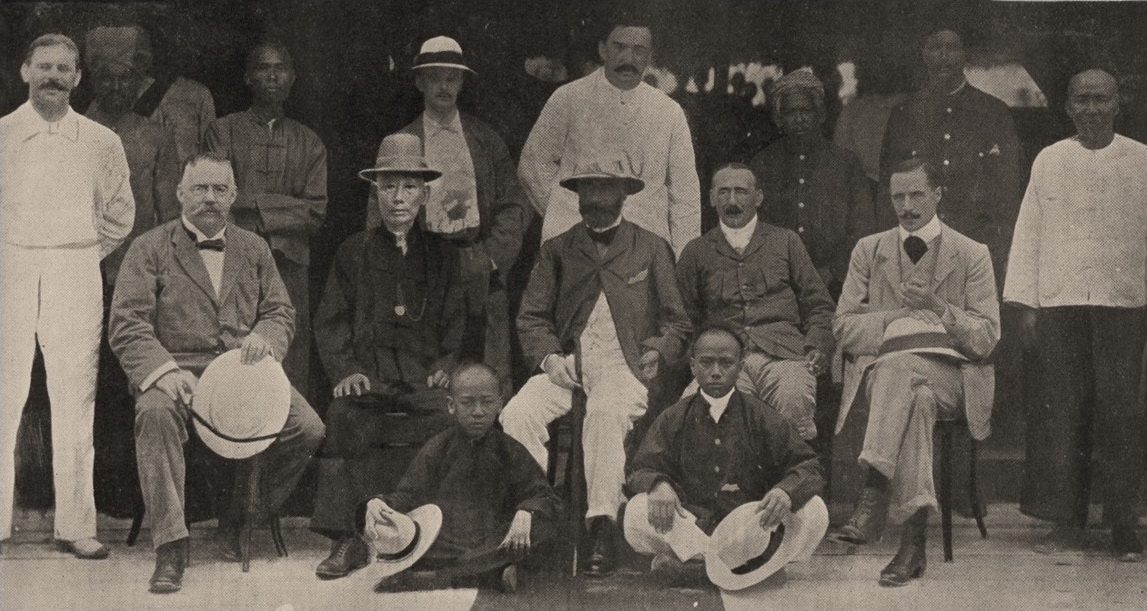
Chinese tycoon Ng Boo Bee with British officials in Perak in 1904

A 1786 British settlement in Penang and another in Singapore in 1819 triggered a mass emigration from China to the Malay Peninsula. After the establishment of British rule in Labuan in 1846, more ethnic Chinese (primarily Hakka, and many from Singapore) arrived in British Borneo. The migration continued through the first few years of the North Borneo Chartered Company. Chinese migration to Labuan and North Borneo was largely confined to the agricultural sector; migration to the Raj of Sarawak was largely restricted to the mining and agricultural sectors. Rajah Charles Brooke of Sarawak promoted the migration of Chinese and Dayak people to interior Sarawak to develop the region. This resulted in the establishment of an administrative center and bazaar by the 19th century, primarily in Sarawak's First, Second, and Third Divisions.

Rajah Charles invited Chinese black-pepper growers from Singapore to settle in Kuching in 1876, and they were later joined by local Chinese miners and others from neighbouring Dutch Borneo. With the introduction of pepper to the kingdom, pepper cultivation in Sarawak's First Division Kuching-Serian region was dominated by the Hakka; Fuzhou and Cantonese people dominated cultivation in the Third Division Sarikei-Binatang region, making Sarawak the world's second-largest pepper producer. After the British gained control of the four states of Perak, Selangor, Negeri Sembilan and Pahang, nearly two million Chinese immigrated to Perak and Selangor.

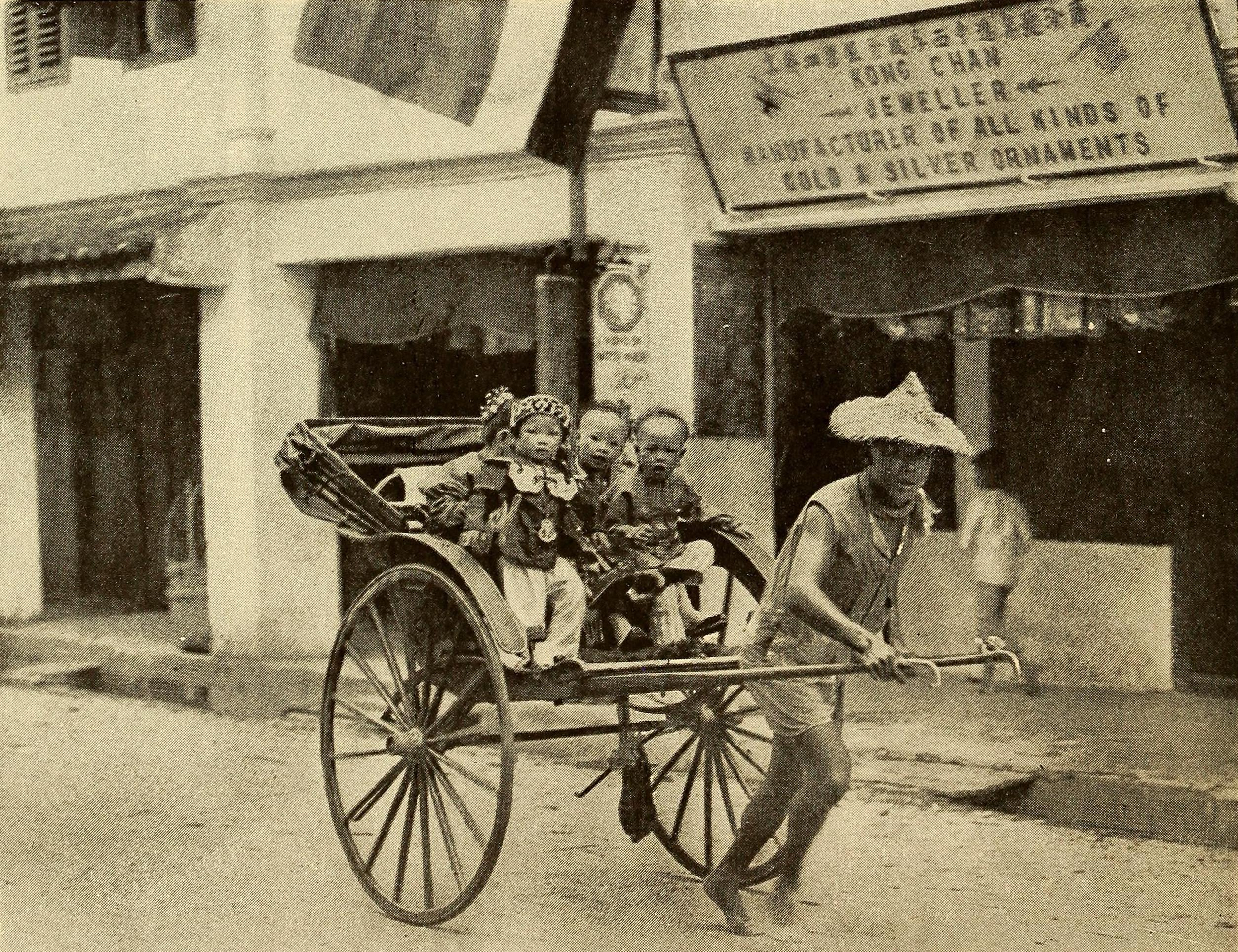
Children in a rickshaw pulled by a Chinese coolie in Kuching around 1919

After the discovery of tin deposits in British Malaya, many Chinese immigrants worked in the tin-mining industry. As tin mines opened in Perak, many Chinese in neighbouring Penang became wealthy. Many Chinese tin-mining communities were established in the Malay Peninsula by the 1870s, particularly in Ipoh (Kinta Valley), Taiping, Seremban and Kuala Lumpur (Klang Valley). Each of the mining communities was governed by a Kapitan Cina, with duties and privileges similar to those in Johor's Kangchu system. Chinese migration sprang from poverty in rural China and employment opportunities in the British colonies or protectorates, and an estimated five million Chinese had immigrated by the 19th century. Despite economic prosperity after immigration, the new Chinese communities split into a number of secret societies. This exacerbated political unrest among the Malay aristocracy, which enlisted help from the secret societies. Contemporary local Malay politics was characterised as anarchy and civil war between people from similar backgrounds, prompting alliances between senior Malay political leaders and officials from China and Europe who were protecting their investments.

=== Divided nationalism and turbulence (1900–1945) ===
You can help shoulder the responsibility of saving our country by donating your money, while our comrades in our country are sacrificing their lives.

— Sun Yat-sen at the 1910 Penang conference in the Straits Settlements of Penang

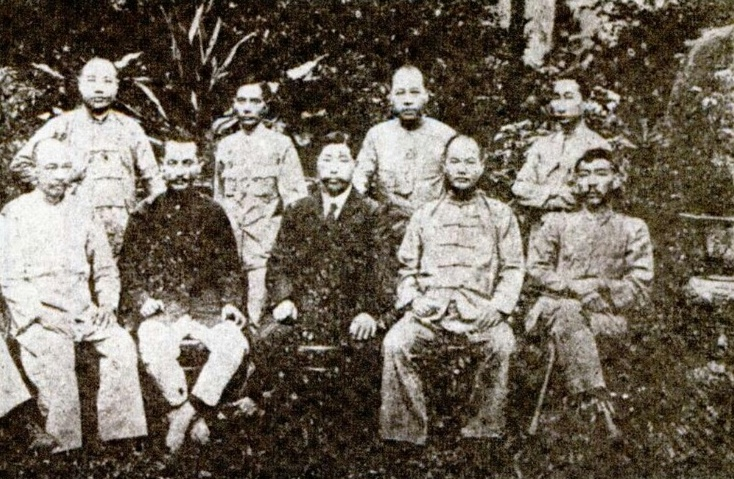
Tongmenghui fundraising meeting in Ipoh for the Second Guangzhou Uprising, c. 1911

Civil wars and other conflicts among the indigenous ethnic groups ended when the British gained control of Malaya and the northern island of Borneo by the 1900s. However, none of the Malay kingdoms fell under colonial rule. Their related entities were politically and economically stable. Economic prosperity was fueled by British capital and Chinese and Indian work forces who expanded and supplied tin and rubber production. Before the 1911 Xinhai Revolution which overthrew the Qing dynasty in China, Tongmenghui leader Sun Yat-sen raised funds and organisational support from overseas Chinese communities (primarily in French Indochina, the Dutch East Indies, the Philippines, Siam, British Singapore, Malaya and Borneo) and began Nanyang organising activities in Saigon, Hanoi, Pontianak, Manila, Bangkok, Singapore and George Town. Competition arose among three groups, with each group targeting overseas Chinese (particularly in Malaya and Singapore) for support. One group was a pro-Qing elite who targeted wealthy Chinese; the other two were reformists and revolutionaries who advocated constitutional reforms, the introduction of a parliamentary system, and the overthrow of Qing and Manchu influence on a modern Chinese nation.

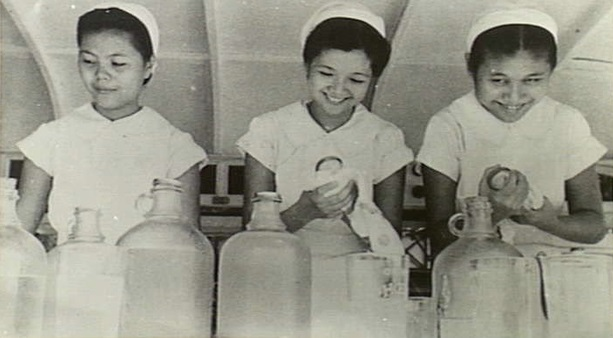
Chinese women working in a British mobile canteen during the Malayan Campaign, c. January 1942

After the revolution which established the Republic of China, branches of the Kuomintang emerged in British Malaya. Kuomintang activities in British Borneo were coordinated by the Democratic Party of North Borneo, consisting of Chinese-educated towkays. Patriotism among Chinese immigrant communities focused on China. British colonial authorities initially did not object to Kuomintang membership. A communist movement developed among overseas Chinese by 1925 with the establishment of the South Seas Communist Party in Singapore, followed by the Indochinese Communist Party, Communist Party of Malaya, Communist Party of Burma and Communist Party of Siam; the movement also maintained relations with the earlier, Southeast Asian Communist Party of Indonesia. The Communist Party of Malaya followed the general communist policy of opposing Western democracies before World War II, increasing propaganda against the Malayan government and the colonial government of Singapore in 1940.

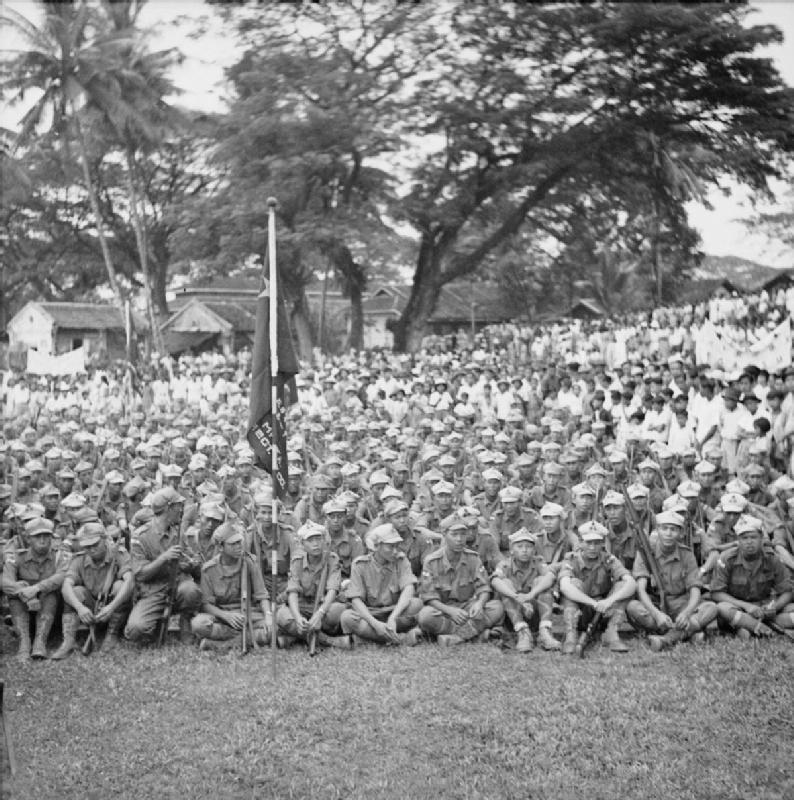
Malayan Peoples' Anti-Japanese Army (MPAJA) guerrillas during their disbandment ceremony in Kuala Lumpur after the end of World War II

At the beginning of the Sino-Japanese conflict and the Japanese occupation of Malaya and British Borneo, Kuomintang activities were ended. When the Chinese Communist Party (under Mao Zedong) reached an agreement with the Kuomintang government (under Chiang Kai-shek) to put aside their differences and rally against Japanese aggression in July 1940, pro-independence sentiment led to bans on the Kuomintang and other Chinese organizations in Malaya. Since the conflict with Japan also involved the British, Chiang Kai-shek urged Kuomintang members to fight alongside them; in return, British colonial authorities lifted their ban of Chinese associations (including the Kuomintang and the Chinese communist movement). This, and British recognition of the Communist Party of Malaya, resulted in the formation of the guerrilla Malayan Peoples' Anti-Japanese Army (MPAJA) in 1941. The MPAJA (primarily consisting of ethnic Chinese in Malaya) waged a guerrilla war against the Imperial Japanese Army (IJA) with 10,000 men in eight battalions, and contacted the British Force 136. Local Kuomintang revolts, such as the Jesselton uprising in British Borneo, were suppressed by the Kenpeitai.

Much Chinese underground anti-Japanese activity in North Borneo was part of the Nanyang Chinese National Salvation Movement, led by Tan Kah Kee; in Sarawak, activities were coordinated by the Sarawak Anti-Fascist League. The MPAJA was disbanded after the 1945 Allied victory in the Pacific, and many of its leaders were commended by the British. It began to massacre perceived collaborators (primarily Malay) after it was disbanded, however, sparking a Malay backlash. The MPAJA also targeted British posts, with several grenade attacks on British troops. In North Borneo, the Chinese co-operated with the British and pledged loyalty to King George VI when the Crown Colony of North Borneo was formed after the war.

=== Postwar unrest and social integration (1946–1962) ===
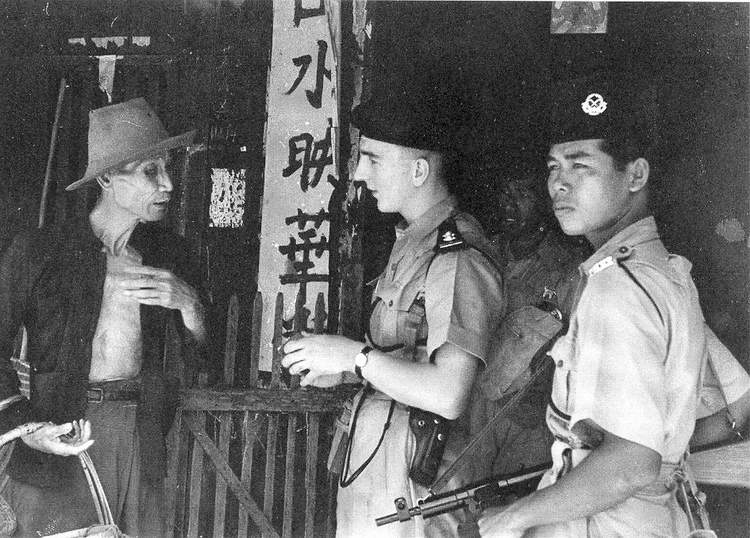
British and Malayan police talking to a Chinese civilian about communist activity in the area in 1949

The answer [to the uprising] lies not in pouring more troops into the jungle, but in the hearts and minds of the people.

— Gerald Templer after his appointment as British High Commissioner for Malaya to deal with the 1952 Malayan Emergency

With the MPAJA renamed as the Malayan National Liberation Army (MNLA), communist insurgents used guerrilla tactics in the jungles, sabotaged transportation networks and attacked British plantations (assassinating several European plantation owners). British intelligence estimated MNLA support at about 500,000, out of a total Chinese population of 3.12 million; battling the insurgents was difficult, since most hid in inaccessible jungles. With the 18 June 1948 declaration of the Malayan Emergency, the early government response was chaotic; its primary aim was to guard important economic targets. Most Malayan Chinese opposed the MNLA.

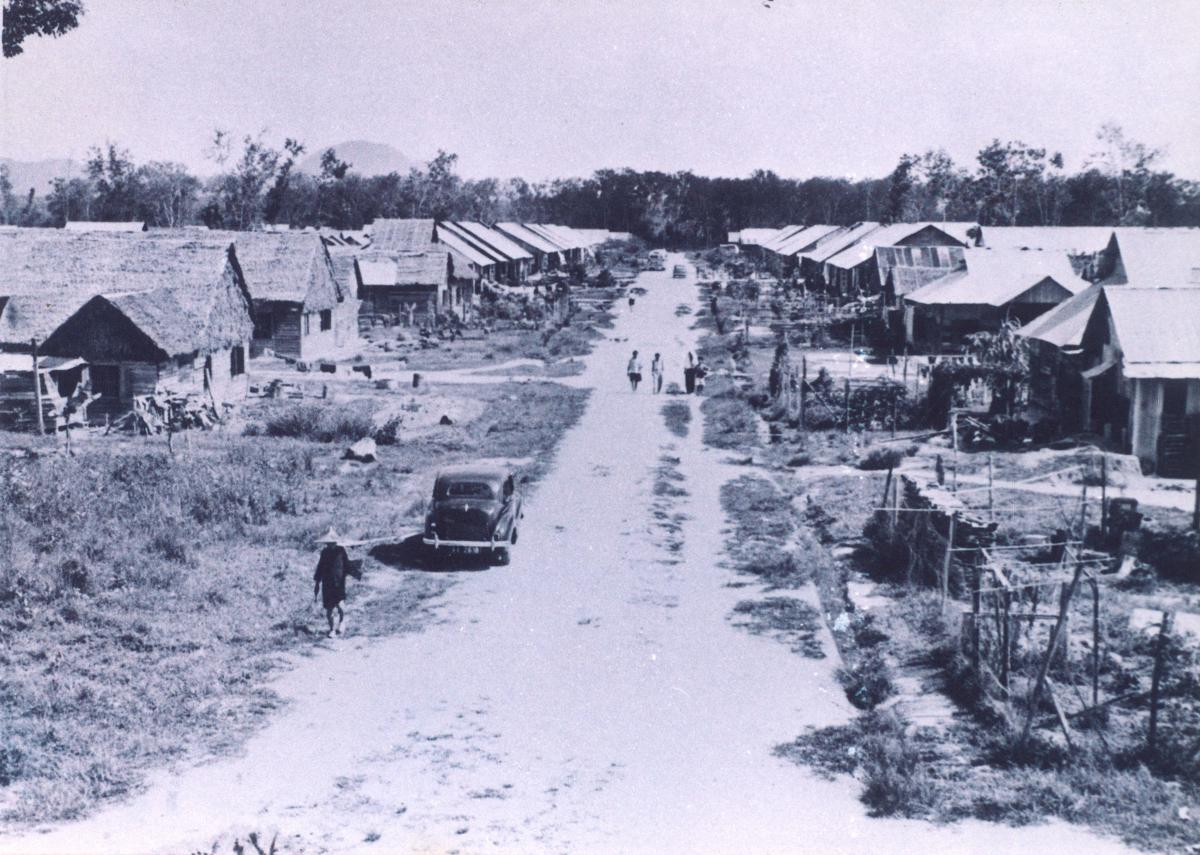
New villages were established during the 1950s to segregate Chinese with connections to communist insurgents.

The 1950 Briggs Plan, devised by British general Harold Briggs, intended to isolate the Chinese population from the insurgents. Independence was promised, and supported by the Malays; the Chinese population feared being treated as second-class citizens in an independent Malaya. In addition to new villages, the plan included labour reorganisation, the deployment of troops throughout Malaya, and cooperation between the police, the army, and intelligence. Under the resettlement scheme, more than 700,000 rural Chinese communities were relocated in 582 new government settlements. After British high commissioner Henry Gurney died in a 1951 ambush, Gerald Templer was appointed as the new high commissioner for Malaya by Winston Churchill the following year; Templer preferred winning hearts and minds to military measures against the insurgents. As part of his campaign, Templer incentivised rebel surrender and used strict curfews and tight control of food supplies in involved areas to flush them out. Crops grown by insurgents were sprayed with herbicides and defoliants, and restrictions were lifted in areas free of insurgents by elevating them to "white status". In the Batang Kali massacre, 24 unarmed Malaysian civilians suspected of providing aid to the MNLA were shot by a Scots Guard division in late 1948.

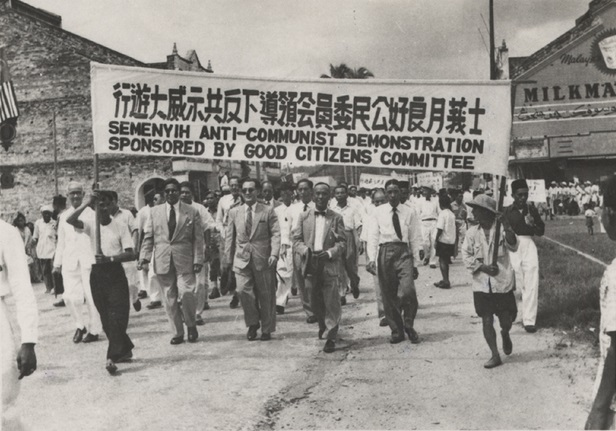
Joint Chinese-Malay anticommunist demonstration in Semenyih, Selangor during the 1950s

According to Chin Peng, the success of Templer's campaign was primarily due to the Briggs Plan's resettlement programme; Gurney also introduced a quasi-ministerial system, with a bill to increase the number of non-Malays eligible for citizenship after independence. After the 1949 Chinese Communist Revolution, foreign missionaries in China were forced to leave; Templer invited them to Malaya to provide spiritual healing, medical education and welfare measures to residents of the new government villages. By September 1952, every person born in Malaya (including 1.2 million Chinese) was granted full citizenship.

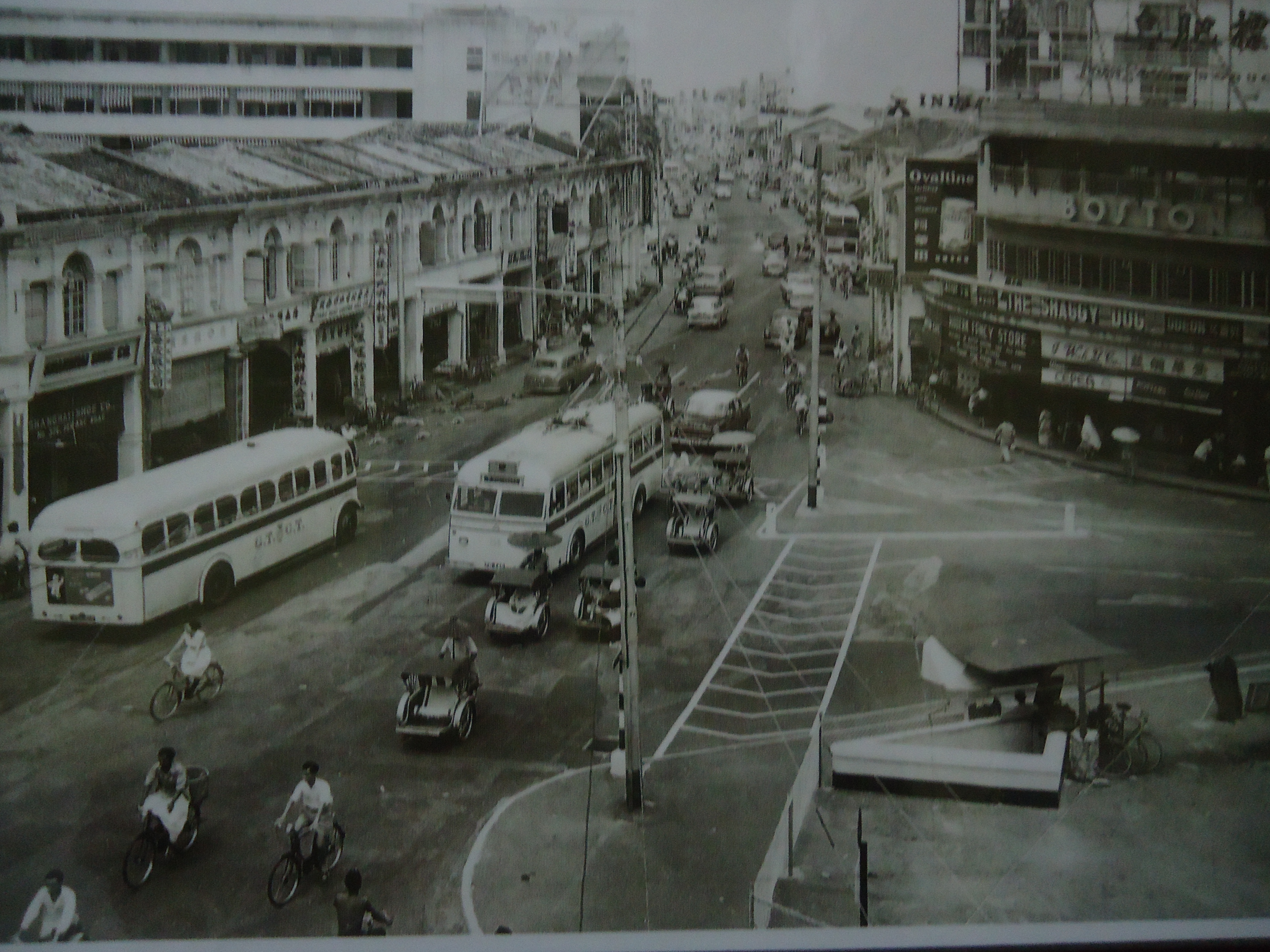
George Town, Penang during the 1950s

When the Federation of Malaya gained independence from the British in 1957, there was still an insurgency. Chinese communists who surrendered were given a choice of repatriation to China or declaring loyalty to the elected government of Malaya and renouncing communist ideology. The anti-communist campaign continued until 1960, when the Malayan government declared the end of its state of emergency after Chin Peng demobilized his forces and left his hide-out in southern Thailand for Beijing via North Vietnam. At a meeting of Chin and Deng Xiaoping in Beijing, China urged the Communist Party of Malaya to continue their armed struggle. The establishment of a communist government in mainland China affected Chinese youth in Sarawak, who organized the pro-Beijing Sarawak Overseas Chinese Democratic Youth League (later the Sarawak Advanced Youth Association, which sparked the 1960 communist insurgency in Sarawak. Malaysia's economy continued to prosper, dependent on tin and rubber industries dominated by a Chinese and Indian workforce.

=== Struggle for equality in "Malaysian Malaysia" (1963–1965) ===
Early in 1961, when Prime Minister Tunku Abdul Rahman outlined a "Grand Malaysian Alliance" of the British protectorate of Brunei and the crown colonies of North Borneo, Sarawak and Singapore, Singapore Prime Minister Lee Kuan Yew supported the proposal. Lee's People's Action Party (PAP) rallied for the equality of all Malaysians, regardless of "class, skin colour or creed", known as "Malaysian Malaysia", in a multi-ethnic society without Malayisation. Although Lee was seen by Malay extremists in the United Malays National Organisation (UMNO) and the Pan-Malaysian Islamic Party (PAS), as opposed to Ketuanan Melayu after the 1963 formation of Malaysia, he had adopted Malay as Singapore's national language and appointed Malay Yusof Ishak as Yang di-Pertuan Negara.

The Malaysian Chinese Association (MCA), led by Tan Cheng Lock and part of the Malaysian Alliance Party, refused to join the struggle for equality. The MCA feared that equality would disrupt an agreement between the United Malays National Organisation (UMNO) and the Malaysian Indian Congress (MIC) in which Malays were politically dominant and the Chinese controlled the country's economy; Malaysian Indians played a smaller economic role, with the Malays promising to share future political power with the other two groups. After two years as part of the federation and the enactment of Article 153 of the Constitution of Malaysia, Lee was joined by the Malay Peninsula's United Democratic Party and People's Progressive Party and Sarawak's United Peoples' Party and Machinda Party in the Malaysian Solidarity Convention to campaign for equality. In a June 1965 speech at the MSC meeting in Singapore, Lee said:

It took a long time for us all to come to the same conclusions despite our differing experiences in Malaya, Singapore, Sabah and Sarawak. Our friends in Sabah are not here today officially, but I can assure you that we have many friends there. There is no doubt that it took us a long time to reach the inevitable conclusion that these people [referring to the racial politics in Malay Peninsula] were up to no good. You know the line they were taking with growing truculence on a heavy racial accent, the intimidatory postures and the snarling guttural notes on which they sent out their signals to their followers on the basis of the race lead us to only one conclusion -- that if this goes on, Malaysia will not belong to Malaysians. Since there are so many Malaysians, we decided that the time has come for us to speak our minds.

Lee's call for a re-alignment of forces between those who wanted a "true Malaysian nation" and those who preferred a country led by a component of the Alliance Party, and his criticism of Malays advocating Malay dominance, led to bitter PAP–UMNO relations and the 1964 race riots in Singapore; Singapore was later expelled from the federation in August 1965, and became its own sovereign nation.

=== Communist insurgencies and racial clashes (1965–1990) ===
The struggle for equality continued with the Democratic Action Party (DAP), which succeeded the PAP in 1965. Many Malaysian Chinese began to view the Malaysian Chinese Association as more concerned with business and economic interests than social factors, although Prime Minister Tunku Abdul Rahman considered the MCA the sole legitimate representative of the federation's Chinese community. In 1968, communists supported by China began a new insurgency from their stronghold in southern Thailand. The following year, the MCA was challenged by the DAP and the Malaysian People's Movement Party (GERAKAN). Of its 33 parliamentary seats contested in the election, the MCA retained 13 and lost control of the Penang state government to GERAKAN; Chinese-Malay tensions culminated in the 13 May incident. Other clashes were also ethnic in nature.

In the aftermath of the riots, Prime Minister Tunku Abdul Rahman blamed the communists rather than racial issues and said that the Vietnam War in their neighbour was "not simply a civil war but communist-ideology expansion". The Malaysian government introduced several policy initiatives in security and development, a neighbourhood-watch program and the People's Volunteer Corps. The Communist Party of Malaya split into two factions during the early 1970s: a revolutionary wing in 1970 and a Marxist–Leninist wing in 1974. Kuala Lumpur and Beijing established diplomatic relations in 1974; China ended its aid to the factions, prompting their 1983 merger into the Malaysian Communist Party before their surrender to Thai authorities four years later and the 1989 peace agreement ending the insurgency. A Chinese communist insurgency in Sarawak, supported by neighbouring Indonesia, ended with peace negotiations in 1990.

=== 1990 to present ===
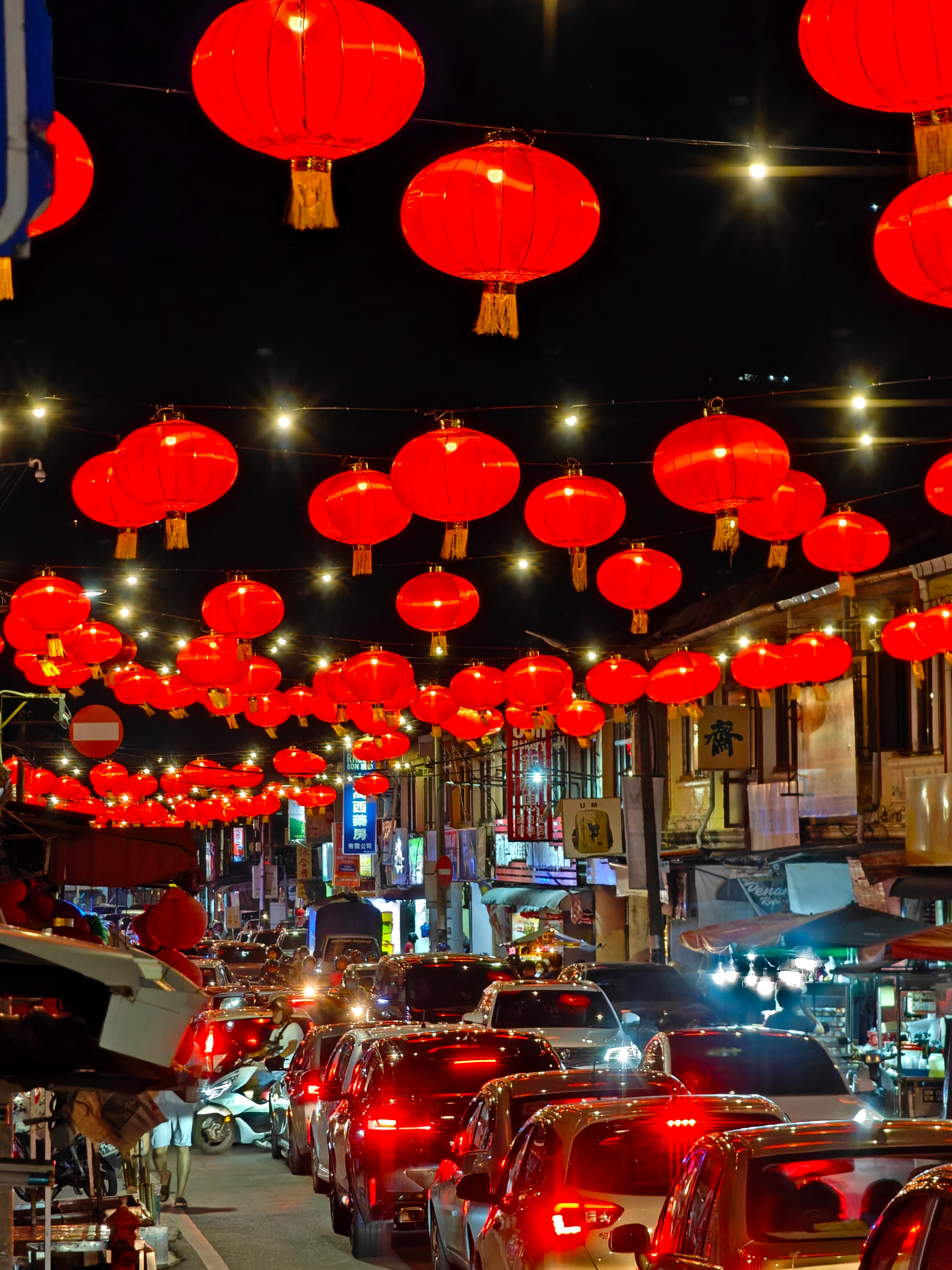
Chinese New Year decorations in George Town, Penang

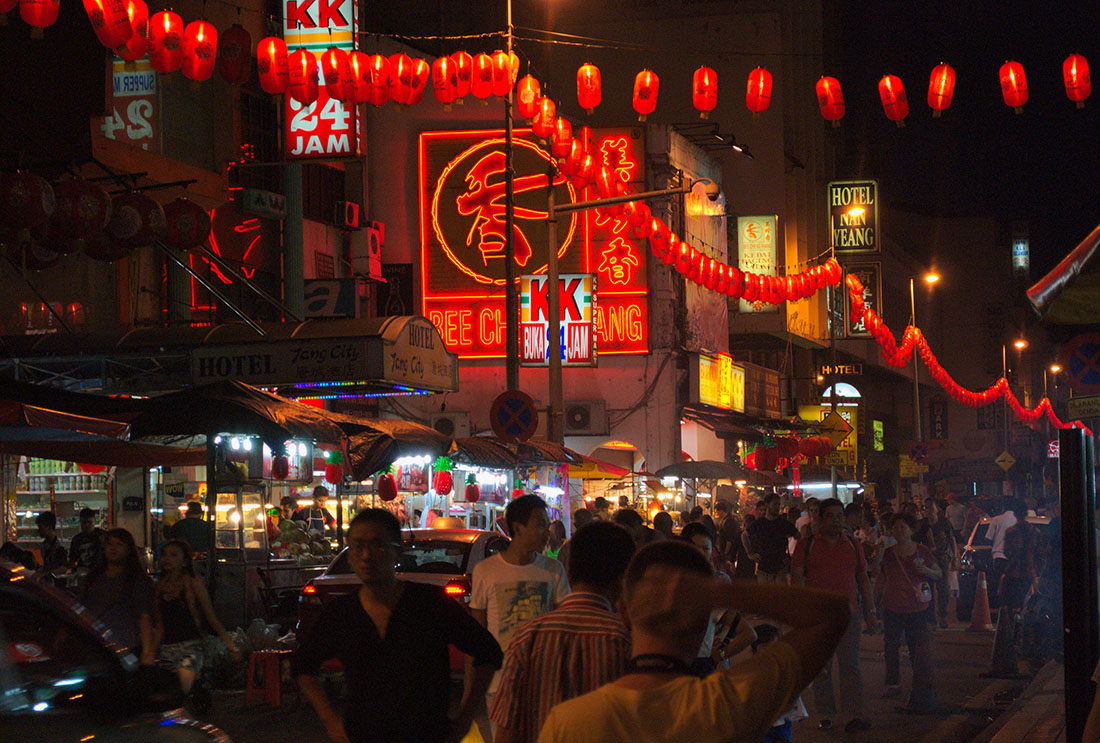
Petaling Street, a Chinatown in Malaysia's capital of Kuala Lumpur, at night

Issues between the Malaysian Chinese and the Malays remain unresolved. The failure of Malaysia's social contract has led to a strong Chinese identity, in contrast to the Chinese communities in neighbouring Indonesia, the Philippines, Singapore, Thailand and Vietnam. After the 1969 racial clashes, the Malaysian New Economic Policy favouring the Malays from 1971 to 1990 increased Bumiputera economic control by 60 percent. Malaysian Chinese remain the business sector's dominant players; equity ownership doubled from 22.8 percent in 1969 to 45.5 percent in 1990, and nearly all of Malaysia's richest people are Chinese.

Since Malaysian Chinese manage the country's economy, most (75.8 percent in 1991) live in urban areas. They generally do not speak Malay among themselves; this contrasts with earlier Chinese communities such as the Straits-born Chinese of Baba-Nyonya, Kelantanese and Terengganuan Peranakans, Penangite Hokkien and Sabah Sino-natives, who mingled with local Malay and other indigenous peoples. Chinese in East Malaysia in Sabah and Sarawak, particularly in small inland towns, interact more closely with the indigenous communities. Integration issues in present-day Malaysia are largely inherited from Malayan racial politics, in which ethnic communities consolidated into a single political community. Malaysia's contemporary educational and social policies has created a Chinese brain drain to developed countries, especially Singapore. The country has experienced a slight wave of Mandarin-speaking immigrants from northeastern China and a smaller number of Vietnamese immigrants, however, with local men marrying women from China and Vietnam.

== Origins and social demographics ==
Map of the geographic origin of the present-day ethnic Chinese Malaysians since their early migrations from China to Nanyang region more than a hundred years ago.

Since their early ancient trade connection and subsequent migrations, the majority of ethnic Chinese in Malaysia are ethnic Han from the historical areas of Fujian and Guangdong provinces in southern China. Nearly all ethnic Chinese Malaysians living in the country today are either patrilineal descendants of these early immigrants, or new immigrants born in mainland China. Among the first group from the first migration wave are the Peranakans in Kelantan and Terengganu, Sino-Natives in Sabah and Straits-born Chinese (Baba-Nyonya) in Malacca and Penang. The Taiping Rebellion in the mid-19th century caused much chaos and suffering in southern China, which led many ethnic Chinese civilians to seek refuge overseas, particularly to the Nanyang region (Southeast Asia) in further south. With the expanding British colonial ambitions in the region which led to the establishment of Straits Settlements, more migrants were attracted and the region became an important destination for Chinese emigration.

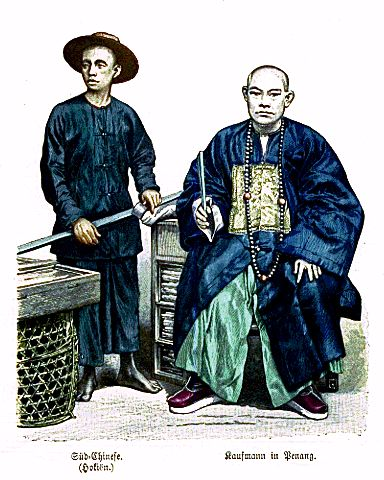
An 1880 painting of southern Chinese merchant from Fujian (left) and Chinese official in Penang Island.

By the late 19th century with the second wave of migration through the British colonial rule, the Hokkien of southern Fujian led by many of their wealthy and powerful individuals with skills in finance and maritime shipping became the dominant immigrant group as the first group of ethnic Chinese to settle in large numbers with their language become a contact language among Chinese of different linguistics background. The Cantonese from Guangdong follow suit and became well known as mineworkers, land reclamation, mechanics and their familiarity with cash cropping. Another large group, the Hakka are mostly hill farmers originated from northeastern Guangdong and various southern China places who specialise in forest clearance, mining as well on metalworking. Other groups like the Teochew from Chaozhou of eastern Guangdong are mainly on plantation agriculture, the Fuzhou from central Fujian specialise in entrepreneurship, while the Hainanese from Hainan as one of the ethnic Chinese minority saw themselves as sojourners with many of Hainanese chefs and waiters ruled the kitchen of local Chinese kopi tiam and restaurants. The Henghua and Hokchia from eastern Fujian are usually managing family industries while the Kwongsai from Guangxi are employed in labour sectors. Followed by the third wave of ethnic Chinese migration thereafter, this resulted from Malaysia as being one of the countries outside China and Taiwan with largest population of Chinese speakers in the world. Following the establishment of diplomatic relationship between Mainland China and Malaysia in 1974, a joint communiqué was made between the two nations, which stated:

The Chinese government considers anyone of Chinese origin who has taken up his own will or acquired Malaysian nationality as automatically forfeiting Chinese nationality. As for residents who retain Chinese nationality of their own will, the Chinese government, acting in accordance with its consistent policy, will enjoin them to abide by the law of the Government of Malaysia, respect the customs and habits of the people there, and live in unity with them, and their proper rights and interests will be protected by the Government of China and respected by the Government of Malaysia.

=== Distribution of Han ethnic subgroups ===
Population of ethnic Chinese by state in 2020
| State or federal territory | Total population | Chinese population | Chinese population (%) |
|---|---|---|---|
| Johor | 4,009,670 | 1,208,652 | 30.1% |
| Kedah | 2,131,427 | 250,600 | 11.8% |
| Kelantan | 1,792,501 | 44,676 | 2.5% |
| Malacca | 998,428 | 205,239 | 20.6% |
| Negeri Sembilan | 1,199,974 | 248,456 | 20.7% |
| Pahang | 1,591,295 | 221,712 | 13.9% |
| Penang | 1,740,405 | 718,362 | 41.3% |
| Perak | 2,496,041 | 643,627 | 25.8% |
| Perlis | 284,885 | 20,480 | 7.2% |
| Sabah | 3,418,785 | 248,920 | 7.3% |
| Sarawak | 2,453,677 | 554,622 | 22.6% |
| Selangor | 6,994,423 | 1,756,181 | 25.1% |
| Terengganu | 1,149,440 | 23,166 | 2.0% |
| Kuala Lumpur | 1,982,112 | 737,161 | 37.2% |
| Labuan | 95,120 | 9,843 | 10.3% |
| Putrajaya | 109,202 | 670 | 0.6% |

Historical population
| Year | Pop. | ±% |
|---|---|---|
| 1970 | 3,555,879 | — |
| 1980 | 4,554,664 | +28.1% |
| 1991 | 4,623,900 | +1.5% |
| 2000 | 5,691,908 | +23.1% |
| 2010 | 6,472,300 | +13.7% |
| 2020 | 6,892,367 | +6.5% |
Note: Main census is released every ten years. Source: Malaysian Population Statistics

Different varieties of Chinese are spoken in Malaysian cities and towns. Across the country, Mandarin has emerged as the lingua franca among the various Chinese subgroups, largely due to its use as the language of instruction in Chinese schools and China's increasing economic influence.

Within Peninsular Malaysia, Hokkien is predominantly spoken in west coast cities such as George Town, Seberang Perai, Klang, Malacca, Batu Pahat and Muar. In contrast, Cantonese is the main Chinese language in Kuala Lumpur, Ipoh, Seremban and Kuantan. Interior towns like Cameron Highlands and Kulai were primarily Hakka-speaking. Teochew was also commonly used along the western coast of Perak and in Johor Bahru. Bentong and Raub contained a substantial Kwongsai-speaking population.

The distribution of Chinese languages in East Malaysia exhibits significant variation. In Sabah, Hakka is the predominant language, particularly in Kota Kinabalu, Lahad Datu, Semporna, Papar and Tawau. In Sarawak, Hakka is also prevalent in towns such as Serian, Kota Samarahan and Bau. Cantonese serves as the main language in Miri and Sandakan. Kuching and Kapit contained multiple language groups, including Hokkien, Hakka and Fuzhou. The town of Sibu was often referred to as a mini-Fuzhou, with the language also being used in Sarikei.

Geographical distributions of ethnic Chinese Malaysians by majority in each cities or towns: Hokkien Cantonese Hakka Fuzhou Hainanese Teochew Kwongsai Hockchia Undetermined majority

The first census conducted in 1970 after Malaysia was formed in 1963 reported that there were 3,555,879 ethnic Chinese Malaysians, with the Hokkien being the majority at 32.4%, followed by Hakka at 22.1%, Cantonese at 19.8%, Teochew and Hainanese at 12.4% and 4.7% respectively. This increase to 4,554,664 in 1980 and 4,623,900 in 1991. In 2000, the census reported that ethnic Chinese Malaysians numbered at 5,691,908, which was approximately 24.45% of the country's population at the time, with 86% of them living in urban areas. In West Malaysia, Hokkien became the leading group followed by Cantonese, Hakka and Teochew. The pattern differs in East Malaysia where Hakka is the majority in Sabah and Sarawak followed by Hokkien and Cantonese in Sabah and the Fuzhou, Hokkien and Teochew in Sarawak. The population increased further to 6,392,636 by 2010 and 6,892,367 by 2020. As of 2020, over three-fifths of Malaysia's ethnic Chinese resided in Selangor, Johor, Kuala Lumpur and Penang. Penang also had the largest percentage of Chinese and was the only state where the Chinese constituted a plurality.

There is also a small community of Huáběi-ren (Northern Chinese) in Sabah whose ancestors coming from various parts of Hebei and Shandong provinces in China with most of them calling themselves as Tiānjīn-ren. Besides that, Sanjiang-ren (Chinese: 三江人) is a collective term used to categorise the group of people whose ancestors hailed from Shanghai, Zhejiang, Jiangsu, Hubei, and Jiangxi. It is a combined group of different spoken varieties and has the fewest people as compared to other Chinese subgroups. The first San Jiang Clansmen Association or San Kiang Association was formed in Penang back in 1897.

Although the ethnic Chinese population had been increasing since the 1970s, their proportion within the total population had been decreasing gradually, particularly caused by the lower birth rate among the Chinese community.

=== Economic, demographic and political representation ===
Proportion of ethnic Chinese and Malay with indigenous voters in the 2018 Malaysian parliamentary constituency: Bright red indicates a higher proportion of ethnic Chinese Bright green indicates a higher proportion of ethnic Malay or indigenous people Mixed colour means that the ratio of the two is equivalent The brownish colour are the area with the higher proportion of other non-indigenous races (such as Indians)

Ethnic Chinese Malaysians have been traditionally dominant in the business sector of the Malaysian economy with large local Chinese enterprises involved in natural resources and food ingredients industries such as sugar and palm oil. Almost every biscuits manufacturer in the country is dominated by ethnic Chinese Malaysians. Up to the 1970s, their economic structure was intertwined with very much family and kinship ties. By the 21st century with the rising of China's economic influence, their economy network are jointly connected with other Overseas Chinese through the bamboo network. The local Chinese played a key role in facilitating China's capital to invest in Malaysia while in the process both benefited from expanded markets, lower labour costs and the introduction of different kind of technologies and managerial systems which resulted from Malaysia becoming the largest trading partner to China in Association of Southeast Asian Nations (ASEAN) region. Nevertheless, unlike the more transboundary business influence by neighbouring Chinese Singaporeans, a majority of Chinese Malaysian businesses are still seen as less concentrating on developing business ties with other Southeast Asian Chinese businessmen despite there have been few businesses made by several local Malaysian Chinese companies.

Since the country's foundation in 1963, the Malaysian Chinese Association (MCA) was the sole legitimate political representation for ethnic Chinese in Malaysia under the multi-racial political coalition of the Alliance Party (later expanded into National Front coalition). However, the growing restriction of non-Malay interests in Malaysian society and politics since the 1970s caused deep dissension among Chinese Malaysians. The perception that their ethnic party representatives were unable to stand for their people's rights grew, and that decision-making was influenced by the Malay supremacists dominated party of United Malays National Organisation (UMNO). The UMNO was the most influential part of the existing political coalition, and also championed Islamic values. Despite the coalition's multi-racial appearance, UMNO founding president Onn Jaafar has once said that their movement did not adhere to any ideology other than "Malayism", defined by Malay scholar Ariffin Omar as the belief that the interests of the Malay race must be upheld over anything else. From 1968, the inability of MCA to preserve ethnic Chinese Malaysian interests, particularly with regards to their culture, education, and language, resulted in the formation of another ethnic Chinese representative party, the Malaysian People's Movement Party (GERAKAN) led by Chinese overseas-educated elite, although this party also joined the Alliance Party coalition in 1972.

The growing Islamisation with "Islamic version of non-tolerant and open", increasing racism within the Malay party members throughout the coalition imposing further into the country social demographics as well as the government discriminative policies on their education and employment, caused further disenchantment among non-Malays, especially ethnic Chinese. This subsequently caused dwindling support from ethnic Chinese Malaysians when many original strongholds of MCA constituents and even Gerakan turned to the Democratic Action Party (DAP) as the latter were seen as more vocal on their rights. The recent country general election in 2018 saw the fall of National Front coalition following additional aid from Bornean parliamentary seats particularly in Sabah that were won by Pakatan Harapan coalition ally of regionalist Sabah Heritage Party (WARISAN) as well from another indigenous party of United Pasokmomogun Kadazandusun Murut Organisation (UPKO) as a result of similar growing frustration over long-time manipulation of the state demographics and resources with lack of development through the administration of the Malay-led supremacists government of UMNO with frequent labelling as "fixed deposit state". During the election, the DAP won a large amount of seats due to the support of many Chinese constituents and subsequently diminished MCA influence among ethnic Chinese Malaysians.

Although the Malaysian Chinese population is increasing in every census, the proportion of ethnic Chinese among the country's total population has been declining in recent decades because of a lower birth rate and high emigration rate. There are significant concerns about the loss of political representation. According to a report by the World Bank, the Malaysian diaspora around the world in 2010 included around a million people, most of them ethnic Chinese. The large number of emigrants, many of whom are young with education or skills, constitutes a significant "brain drain" from the country, especially towards the country's immediate neighbour Singapore.

=== Traditional Chinese Medicine in Malaysia ===
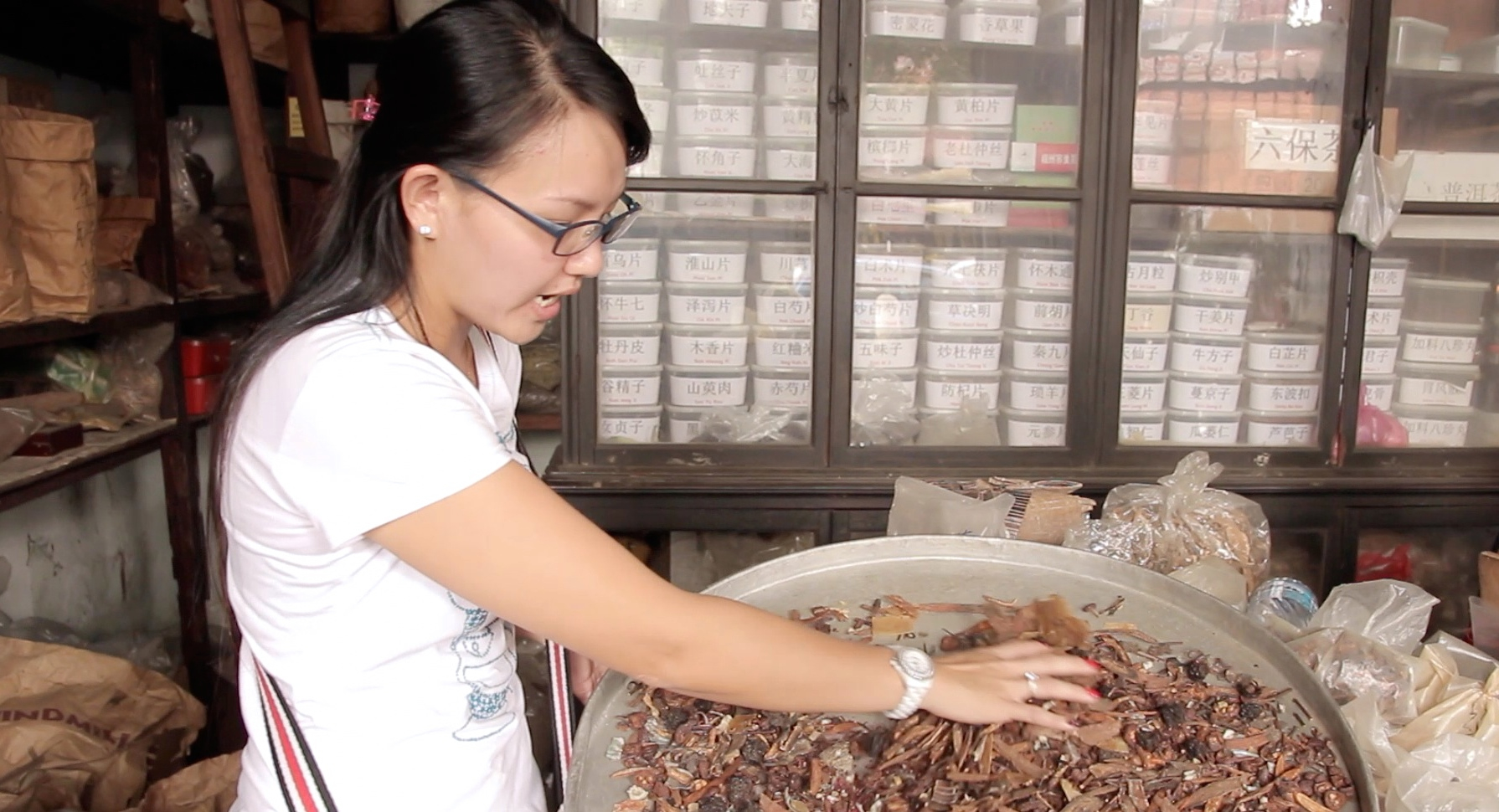
An ethnic Chinese woman in Malaysia grinds and cuts up dried herbs to make traditional Chinese medicine.

Ethnic Chinese Malaysians have contributed to the spread of traditional Chinese medicine in Malaysia. Around 3,000 medicine shops in the country sell traditional Chinese medicine, and there is some regulation under the Health Ministry. Chinese traditional health practice services in the country generally encompass herbal medicine, qigong, chiropractic care, acupuncture, and other techniques. In 2012, the Traditional and Complementary Medicine Bill (T&CM) was passed by the Parliament of Malaysia for the establishment of "Traditional and Complementary Medicine Council or Majlis Perubatan Tradisional dan Komplementari" to register and regulate traditional and complementary medicine practitioners, including traditional Chinese medicine practitioners as well Malay, indigenous and Indians traditional medicine, which was followed by the enforcement of T&CM Act in the following year. Most traditional-medicine pharmacies are family-apprentice trades. While the Health Ministry has tolerated the development of TCM, it does not enforce registration of traditional-medicine practitioners, who are nevertheless allowed to practice the trade.

=== Education ===
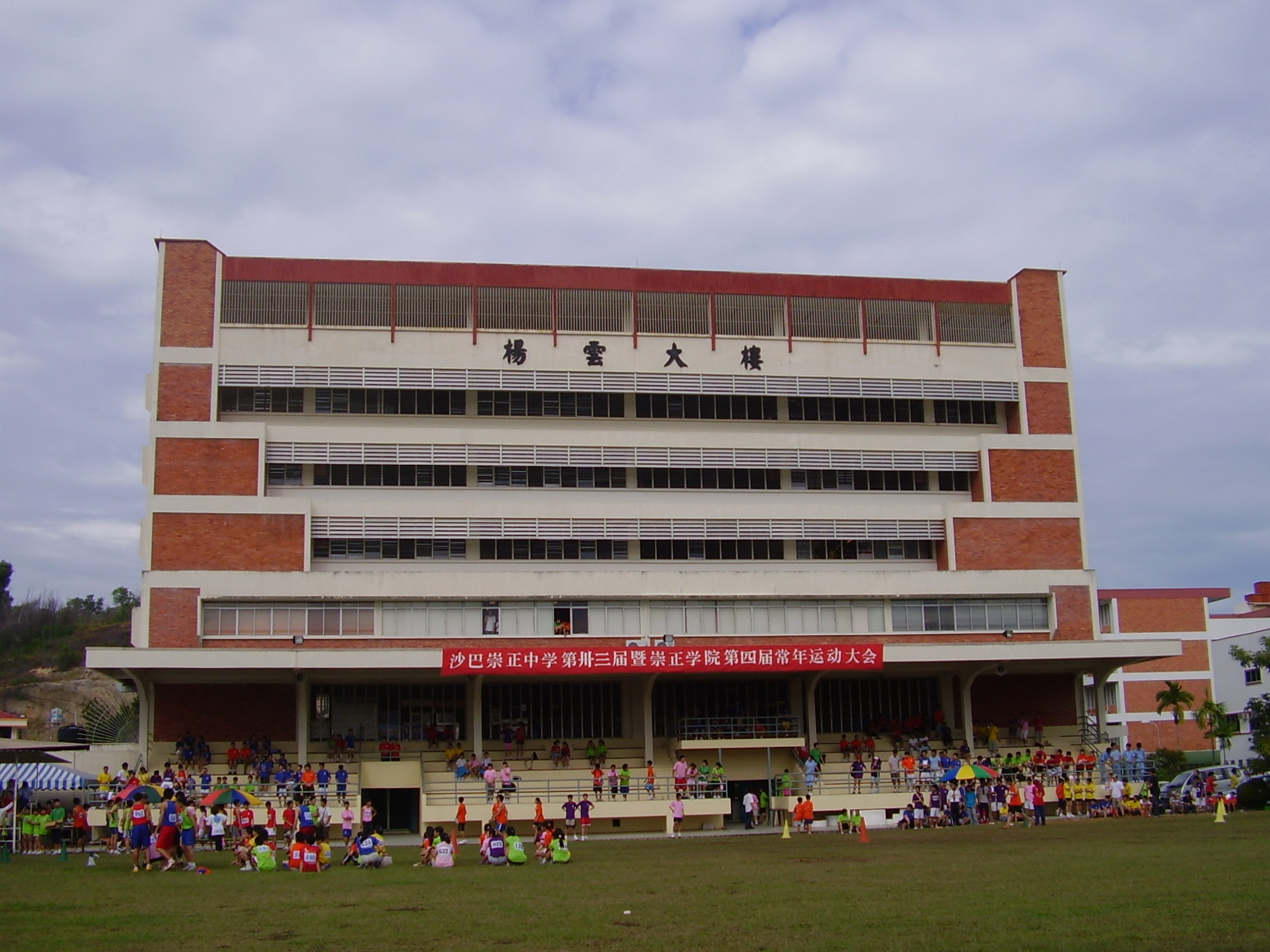
Co-curricular activities in Tshung Tsin Secondary School, a Chinese independent high school in Sabah.

In educational aspects, Malaysia is the only country outside China and Taiwan with a comprehensive and complete Chinese education system and the only Southeast Asian country that has perpetuated the Chinese education system established since the colonial era as a result of heavy brokerage and lobbying efforts by ethnic Chinese Malaysian political leaders with continual funding from local Chinese communities. The first Chinese schools had been established in the country in the 19th century during the British colonial administration. At the same time, Christian missions from China also founded schools for Chinese students to nurture Church workers, this are most notable among many Chinese Christians of Hakka origin in Sabah and the Fuzhou in Sarawak. Following the country's independence, some of the Chinese independent schools who were influenced by the new national agenda and desperately needed government financial support were willingly converted into English medium-schools. However, these schools were later scrupulously converted into Malay medium-schools following the massive elimination of English medium-schools by the Malay-dominated regime in the 1970s in an effort to impose the Malay language as the only medium of instructions in all schools in the aftermath of ethnic riots in 1969. The following period was considered a dark time for local Chinese education and witnessed a growing belief in the idea that the ethnic Chinese in Malaysia had to proceed on a basis of self-reliance and vigilance in order to preserve their language rights as the national education policy was seen as exclusionary and discriminatory for non-Malays, summed up in the aphorism "non-Malays belong to Malaysia but Malaysia only belongs to the Malays".

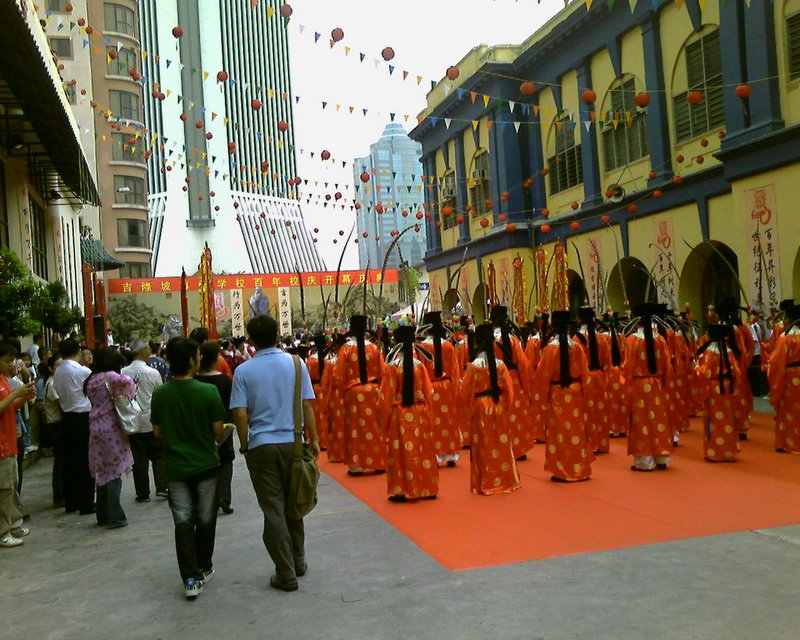
SMJK Confucian in Kuala Lumpur, an example of converted Chinese independent school to government-funded "SMJK" (National-type Chinese secondary school).

Although other remaining Chinese independent schools (Chinese: 独中) were also included in the national school system in 1996, these independent schools still did not receive any financial assistance from the federal government and its United Examinations Certificate (UEC; Chinese: 统考) is not recognised by the government, making students who finish their studies from the local Chinese independent schools unable to enroll in government-funded public tertiary institutions. Since late 1970, ethnic Chinese Malaysians had expanded their own Mandarin-language primary schools where around 90% of their children were enrolled based on the figures from 2006. These schools gained a reputation for not only maintaining good discipline but also providing the high-quality education that the Malay schools were seen by some to lack. This perceived superiority attracted significant interest among Bumiputera parents with various analyses placing the number of Bumiputera students enrollment in Chinese schools between 60,000 and 100,000 in 2000. The federal government's failure to impose Malay as the sole unifying language throughout the country's educational systems unlike in China with Standard Chinese or Indonesia with Indonesian language are mainly attributed to the racial-based policy enforcement of ethnic inclusion and exclusion. Some argue that the educational policies imposed by the federal government over the years in regard to minority language education have created negative consequences for Malaysian youth: a mounting brain drain in particular. A study from 2000 found that the country had lost an ample amount of talented and skilled youth to other more favourable countries as the result of students from the large non-Malay minority language communities being forced to go to university abroad because they did not attend Malay language schools.

=== Vital statistics ===
| | Average population | Live births | Deaths | Natural change | Crude birth rate (per 1000) | Crude death rate (per 1000) | Natural change (per 1000) | Total fertility rate (TFR) |
|---|---|---|---|---|---|---|---|---|
| 2000 | 6,008,833 | 115,429 | 28,281 | 87,148 | 20 | 4.9 | 15.1 | 1.9 |
| 2001 | 6,095,981 | 94,035 | 28,977 | 65,058 | 16.1 | 5 | 11.1 | 1.8 |
| 2002 | 6,161,039 | 97,712 | 30,184 | 67,528 | 16.5 | 5.1 | 11.4 | 1.8 |
| 2003 | 6,228,567 | 91,828 | 30,705 | 61,123 | 15.3 | 5.1 | 10.2 | 1.7 |
| 2004 | 6,289,690 | 89,239 | 31,036 | 58,203 | 14.7 | 5.1 | 9.6 | 1.7 |
| 2005 | 6,347,893 | 88,577 | 31,323 | 57,254 | 14.5 | 5.1 | 9.4 | 1.6 |
| 2006 | 6,405,147 | 86,195 | 31,385 | 54,810 | 13.9 | 5.1 | 8.8 | 1.6 |
| 2007 | 6,459,957 | 86,853 | 32,265 | 54,588 | 13.9 | 5.2 | 8.7 | 1.5 |
| 2008 | 6,514,545 | 85,567 | 33,484 | 52,083 | 13.6 | 5.3 | 8.3 | 1.5 |
| 2009 | 6,566,628 | 81,079 | 34,347 | 46,732 | 12.7 | 5.4 | 7.3 | 1.5 |
| 2010 | 6,613,360 | 74,310 | 35,461 | 38,849 | 11.6 | 5.5 | 6.1 | 1.52 |
| 2011 | 6,652,209 | 76,848 | 36,530 | 40,318 | 11.9 | 5.6 | 6.3 | 1.56 |
| 2012 | 6,692,527 | 85,649 | 37,279 | 48,370 | 13.2 | 5.7 | 7.5 | 1.72 |
| 2013 | 6,740,897 | 70,418 | 38,166 | 32,252 | 10.7 | 5.8 | 4.9 | 1.38 |
| 2014 | 6,773,149 | 74,159 | 39,630 | 34,529 | 11.2 | 6 | 5.2 | 1.41 |
| 2015 | 6,807,678 | 69,884 | 40,977 | 28,907 | 10.5 | 6.2 | 4.3 | 1.35 |
| 2016 | 6,836,585 | 65,568 | 42,552 | 23,016 | 9.8 | 6.3 | 3.5 | 1.35 |
| 2017 | 6,859,601 | 62,213 | 43,868 | 18,345 | 9.2 | 6.5 | 2.7 | 1.2 |
| 2018 | 6,877,946 | 57,926 | 44,809 | 13,117 | 8.5 | 6.6 | 1.9 | 1.1 |
| 2019 | 6,891,063 | 58,184 | 45,659 | 12,525 | 8.5 | 6.7 | 1.8 | 1.1 |
| 2020 | 6,903,588 | 51,241 | 44,544 | 6,697 | 7.4 | 6.5 | 0.9 | 0.98 |
| 2021 | 6,910,285 | 43,833 | 56,104 | -12,271 | 6.3 | 8.1 | -1.8 | 0.85 |
| 2022 | 6,898,014 | 40,249 | 53,333 | -13,084 | 5.8 | 7.7 | -1.9 | 0.79 |
| 2023 | 6,884,930 | 44,818 | 51,834 | -7,016 | 6.5 | 7.5 | -1 | 0.88 |
| 2024 | 6,877,914 | 44,914 | 52,393 | -7,479 | 6.5 | 7.6 | -1.1 | 0.89 |
| 2025 | 6,870,435 | 31,840 | 50,833 | -18,933 | 4.6 | 7.4 | -2.8 | 0.72 |
| 2026 | 6,851,502 | | | | | | | |

=== Natural increase ===
Source: https://www.dosm.gov.my/uploads/release-content/file_20260506094406.pdf

Natural Increase in 2025 for Malaysian Chinese
| State or federal territory | Live Births | Death | Natural Increase | Total Fertility Rate |
|---|---|---|---|---|
| Malaysia | 44,914 | 52,393 | -7,479 | 0.893 |
| Johor | 9,729 | 8,190 | +1,539 | 1.04 |
| Kedah | 1,334 | 2,287 | -953 | 0.72 |
| Kelantan | 330 | 480 | -150 | 1.16 |
| Malacca | 1,442 | 1,827 | -385 | 1.03 |
| Negeri Sembilan | 1,347 | 2,200 | -853 | 0.84 |
| Pahang | 1,254 | 1,941 | -687 | 0.92 |
| Penang | 4,324 | 6,263 | -1,939 | 0.82 |
| Perak | 3,348 | 6,987 | -3,639 | 0.93 |
| Perlis | 96 | 194 | -98 | 0.74 |
| Sabah | 1,141 | 2,499 | -1,358 | 0.59 |
| Sarawak | 4,891 | 4,262 | +629 | 1.2 |
| Selangor | 10,995 | 10,353 | +642 | 0.84 |
| Terengganu | 135 | 228 | -93 | 0.88 |
| Kuala Lumpur | 4,509 | 4,603 | -94 | 0.75 |
| Labuan | 32 | 74 | -42 | 0.33 |
| Putrajaya | 7 | 5 | +2 | 0.93 |

== Culture ==
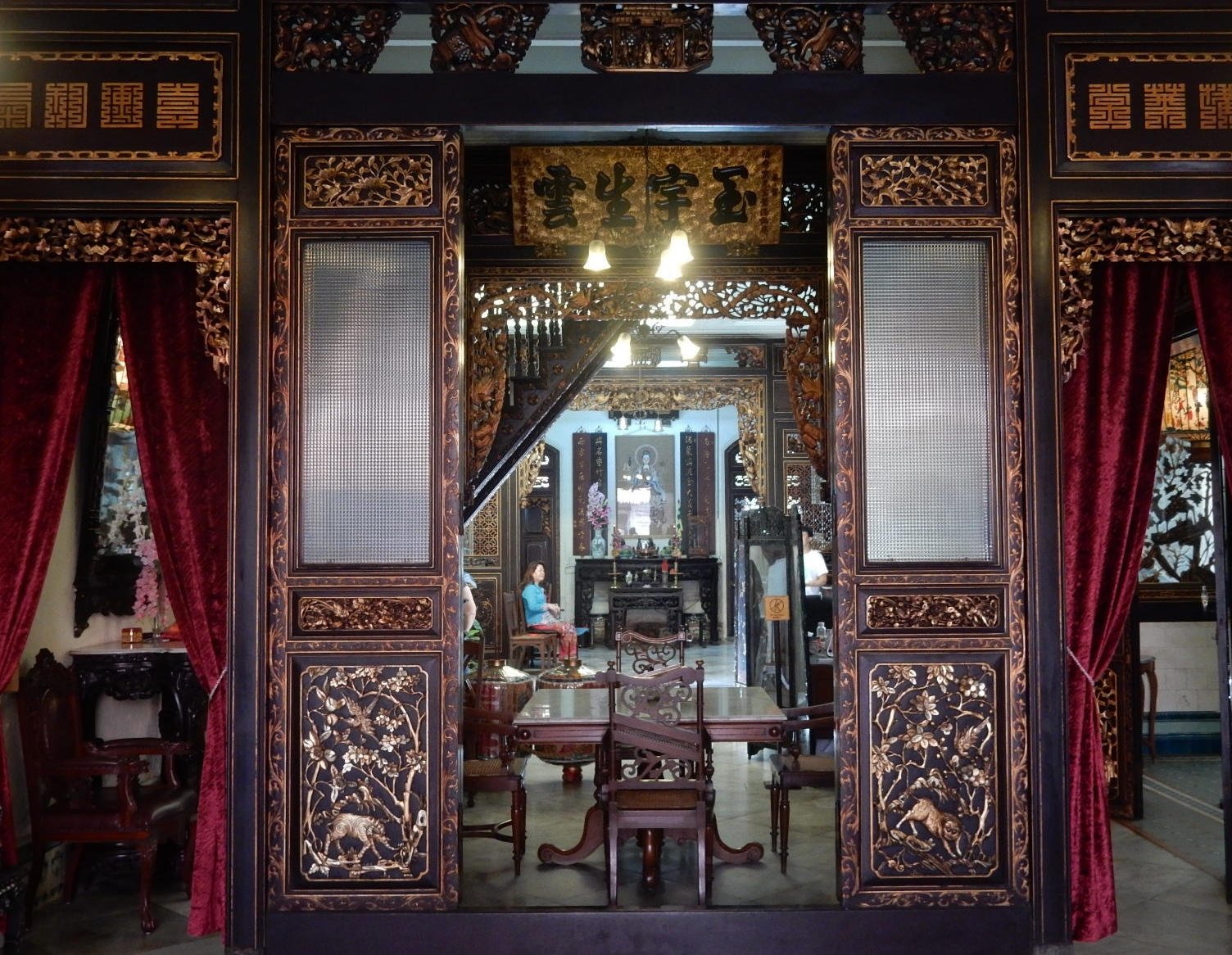
Inside the former house of a Peranakan (Baba-Nyonya or 峇峇娘惹) in Malacca which has now been converted into a museum, a Nyonya can be seen sitting inside wearing the traditional kebaya.

Chinese cultural influences made their mark when ancient trade relations were established with the Nanyang (南洋) region. The massive ethnic Chinese migration during the British colonial period causing a subsequent strong influence on the country's culture, including in cuisine and the language. Aside from the Chinese cultural influence on local culture, ethnic Chinese from the first wave migration before English arrival had mainly adopted a localised culture. The Baba-Nyonya in Malacca had a very strong Malay influence in their clothing and food although still maintaining their Chinese heritage of religion, name, and identity. Their food are made with Malay ingredients and recipes but produced using the Chinese method while their houses are constructed with the infusion of Victorian, Chinese and Malay elements. Together with the Peranakans in Penang, both sides use a mixture of Hokkien and Malay despite the Penang Peranakans speak mainly Hokkien with some borrowed words from Malay words while in Malacca, the Peranakans have adopted Malay patois with some Hokkien words. The food prepared by Penang Peranakans also infuses both Chinese and Malay elements, albeit with an additional Thai influence. The Peranakans in the east coast of Malaysia in Kelantan and Terengganu have much closer ties with the Malay and Siamese community there since most of them has adopted the Malay and Siamese lifestyle.

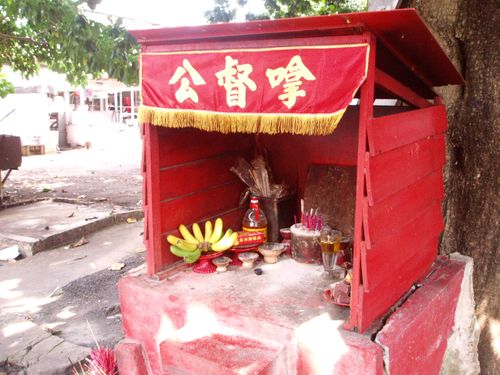
Na Tuk Kong (拿督公) shrine in West Malaysia.

Further, close blood relations between ethnic Chinese and local indigenous in northern Borneo since the early kingdoms period produced the "Sino-Natives" persons in Sabah as a result of inter-marriage between ethnic Chinese there and natives of Sabah. Instead of speaking Chinese languages, these communities spoke the localized Sabah Malay dialect as their main lingua franca since the 14th century. The close relations are marked with earliest records of the "Kina" term which is widely used by the indigenous Dusun to refer to the Chinese ethnicity including for the Dusun homeland mountain of "Mount Kinabalu" (Chinese widow mountain), "Kinabatangan River" (Chinese river) and several other places such as the Kinabalu mountain stream of "Kinataki", a small river in the northeastern coast of "Kinabañgun" and a Chinese land in Labuan Island, the "Kinabenua". The Na Tuk Kong shrine for example shown another sign of assimilation with local culture, where it refers to local Malay guardian spirits worshipped by some ethnic Chinese in West Malaysia and neighbouring Singapore and Indonesia. The term Na Tuk originated from the Malay word of Datuk (grandfather) which then merged with Kong (公, sometimes addressed as 'Kung' meaning elderly male), similar to Tu Ti Kung (Chinese: 土地公), an earth deity worshipped in East Asia.

=== Cuisine ===
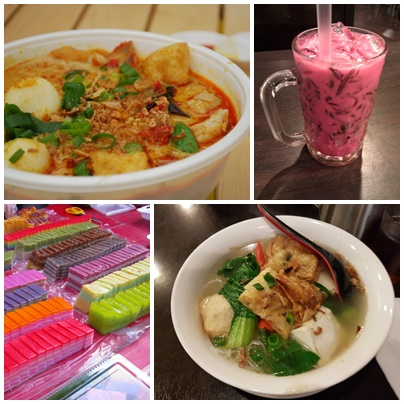
Some of the examples of ethnic Chinese influenced Malaysian cuisine, clockwise from top-right: grass jelly with Bandung, yong tau foo, Nyonya steamed layer cake and laksa noodle.

The ethnic Chinese cuisine in Malaysia is derived from the culinary traditions of their early immigrants and descendants, who have adopted or modified their culinary traditions under the influence of Malaysian culture. Additionally due to the immigration of Chinese to the country, Chinese cuisine has now become an inseparable part in the country's cultural mixture. When Chinese merchants sailed their junks across the South China Sea, they visited ports in Borneo and Malacca, which had a profound influence on the region. Since the local king at that time enjoyed Chinese cuisine, the traders would bring along cooks with them to the island. They introduced ingredients in Chinese cooking such as noodles, bean sprouts, tofu and soy sauce which are by now widely used by every ethnic group in the country. Apart from introducing new ingredients, these earlier traders also discovered ingredients among the local population along the coast, such as the expensive edible bird's nest with the best quality nests claiming to come from Borneo. Since a vast majority of Chinese Malaysians today are descendants of immigrants from southern China, local Chinese cuisine is predominantly based from Fujian, Cantonese, Hakka and Teochew cuisines. Their technique of stir frying ingredients and adding a small portion of cooking oil over high heat in a wok is widely adopted among the nation.

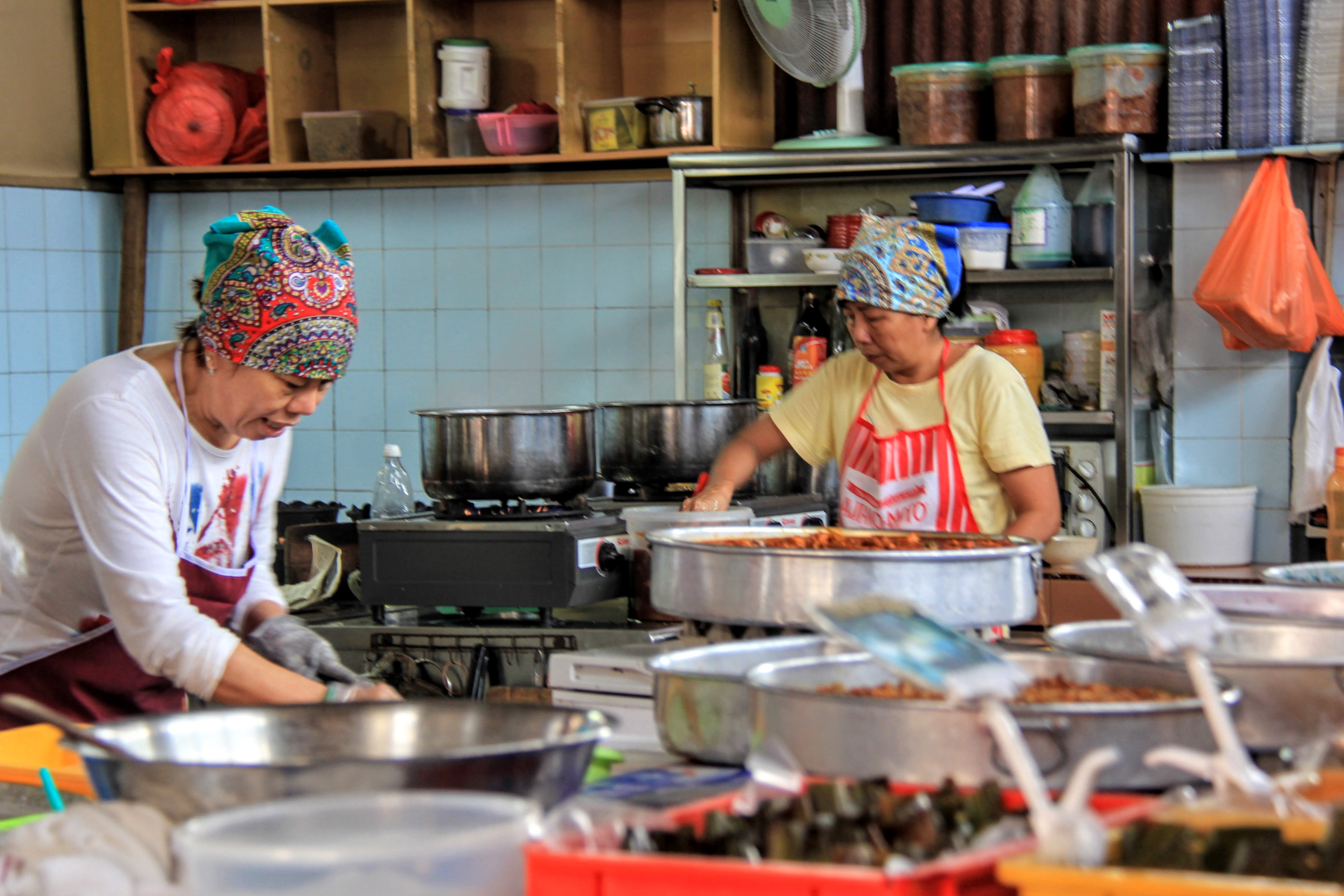
The Nyonya making various traditional kuih.

Chinese Malaysian cuisine had developed a strong penchant for spices and chillies where any local Chinese kopi tiam or restaurant will offer pickled green or red chillies sambal for noodles and rice-based meals. They borrowed curry leaves from the Indians and have since adapted English Worcestershire sauce and tomato sauce along with Indian and Malay spices to the cooking pot. Among the notable Chinese dishes in the country including the bak kut teh (pork rib soup with Chinese herbs), char kway teow (stir fried rice noodle), dim sum (ready-to-serve dishes), hae mee (spicy prawn noodle soup served in savoury broth), Hainanese chicken rice, kai si hor fun (flat rice noodle soup with chicken slices, shrimps and bean sprouts), kolo mee (Sarawakian egg noodle served in dark sauce, tomato sauce or chilli sauce), lor mee (thick yellow noodle served in dark sauce and thick broth), ngiu chap mee (special Sabah mixed beef noodle), pan mee (handmade noodle soup served with pork balls, minced pork, dried anchovies, black fungus and vegetable), sang nyuk mee (special Sabah dry pork noodle or pork noodle soup), wonton mee (dry noodle or noodle soup served with BBQ pork, minced pork and pork or shrimp dumplings) and yong tau foo (tofu and mixed vegetables filled with ground pork mixture or fish paste). Many Chinese Malaysians also can cook Malay-style chicken or fish with most versions of laksa are prepared by them. Some examples of basic Chinese Malaysians drinks that are commercially produced in the country include the black tea, chrysanthemum tea, grass jelly, green tea, jasmine tea, soy milk and white coffee while popular snacks including the cakoi (long deep-fried dough), egg tart, hum ji peng (circle shaped fried dough with or without fillings), UFO tart, ngo hiang (various spiced, minced meat rolls prepared in deep fried style and served with vegetables), pau (steamed buns), popiah (fried or plain spring rolls filled with mixed vegetables), and tau sar piah (pastry biscuits filled with a sweet or savoury filling). The legacy from the first wave migration created the Peranakan (or Baba-Nyonya) ethnicity through a blend between Chinese and Malay which subsequently produced the Peranakan cuisine where they served Indian-style curries with eating etiquette different from mainstream ethnic Chinese society by following the Malay usage of fingers than chopsticks. The Baba-Nyonya also specialized in making a variety of local snacks called kuih which require plenty of patience and skills.

=== Dialects and languages ===
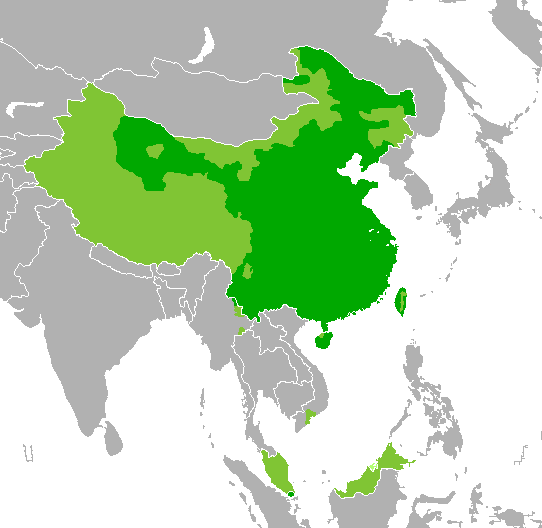
Map of the Mandarin Sinophone world, where Mandarin and other Chinese languages are spoken as a first language among ethnic Chinese in countries where their population is significant: Mandarin Chinese-speaking majority (Coastal and central areas of China, Taiwan and Singapore) Large Mandarin Chinese-speaking minority (Highland China, Malaysia and inner Myanmar) Small Mandarin Chinese-speaking minority (Brunei)

Example of Chinese loanwords in Malay language
| Loanword | English description |
|---|---|
| bihun/mihun | rice vermicelli |
| cakoi | a long deep-fried dough |
| cawan | cup |
| cincai | carelessly, in a hurry, random |
| cincau | grass jelly |
| ginseng | root of herbal plants |
| kapcai | underbone motorcycle |
| kuaci | sunflower seed |
| kuetiau | rice noodle |
| kuih | snack and dessert |
| longkang | drainage |
| mee/mi | noodle |
| pau | steamed bun |
| popia/popiah | fried spring roll |
| samseng | gangster |
| tauhu | tofu |
| tauke | big boss |
| teh | tea |
| tongkang | Chinese sailing ship |
Source: Asmah 1975, p. 40 and DBP

The 1970 Malaysian Census reported Hokkien as the largest Chinese subgroup, accounting for 34.2% of the country's Chinese population, followed by Hakka with 22.1%, Cantonese with 19.8%, Teochew with 12.4% and Hainanese with 4.7%. In 2003, more detailed statistics for each language reported Hokkien with 2,020,914, Hakka with 1,092,835, Cantonese with 1,068,008, Teochew with 497,280, Hokchew with 251,553, Hainanese with 141,045, Kwongsai with 51,674, Henghua with 24,654, Hockchia with 14,935, and different other ethnic Chinese with 202,977, for a total of 5,365,875. The Malaysian Hokkien are divided into two localised dialects; the Penang Hokkien (northern) comprising Penang, Kedah, Perlis and Perak, and Southern Peninsular Hokkien in Johor, Malacca and neighbouring Singapore. The northern Hokkien contains more Malay loanwords than the southern with the latter maintaining more of their original Hokkien words. Many Hokkien living in Sarawak have been influenced heavily by indigenous language similarly with Hokkien in Kelantan where their language was heavily localised following close interaction with local Malays and Siamese. Localised Hokkien also spoken primarily by the Peranakan community (Baba-Nyonya) in both Malacca and Penang. Generally, Hokkien became a contact language among ethnic Chinese of different linguistic background in most parts of Malaysia.

The Malaysian Cantonese became the contact language in the Malaysia's capital of Kuala Lumpur albeit with a distinct phonology and grammar from standard Cantonese spoken in Pearl River Delta region of China including in Hong Kong and Macau. Hakka assumes the role of contact language in Sabah but in the rest of the country the language is more commonly used as an intra-group language than a lingua franca within the Chinese community, with about 66% of Hakka in Johor preferring localised Mandarin. Similar studies on Eastern Min speakers of the Fuzhou community in Sarawak also found a general shift of language choice from their own language to Mandarin Chinese and English. Despite the Teochew not being the largest subgroup, Teochew has become a bridge language for trade between Teochew exporters in China and wholesalers in Malaysia. Hainanese is another minority language, within the Min branch. These languages, and others like Henghua, are also often called "dialects", despite being linguistically distinct Chinese languages. Mandarin, originally spoken by a small northern Chinese minority, is becoming a major working language among all Chinese in the country, with Standard Mandarin used as the medium of instruction in local Chinese-medium schools and independent high school, although the language is still not necessarily spoken in their daily life. Based on early Malaysian Census in 1970, around 41% of ethnic Chinese Malaysians are able to converse in Mandarin.

=== Holidays and festivities ===
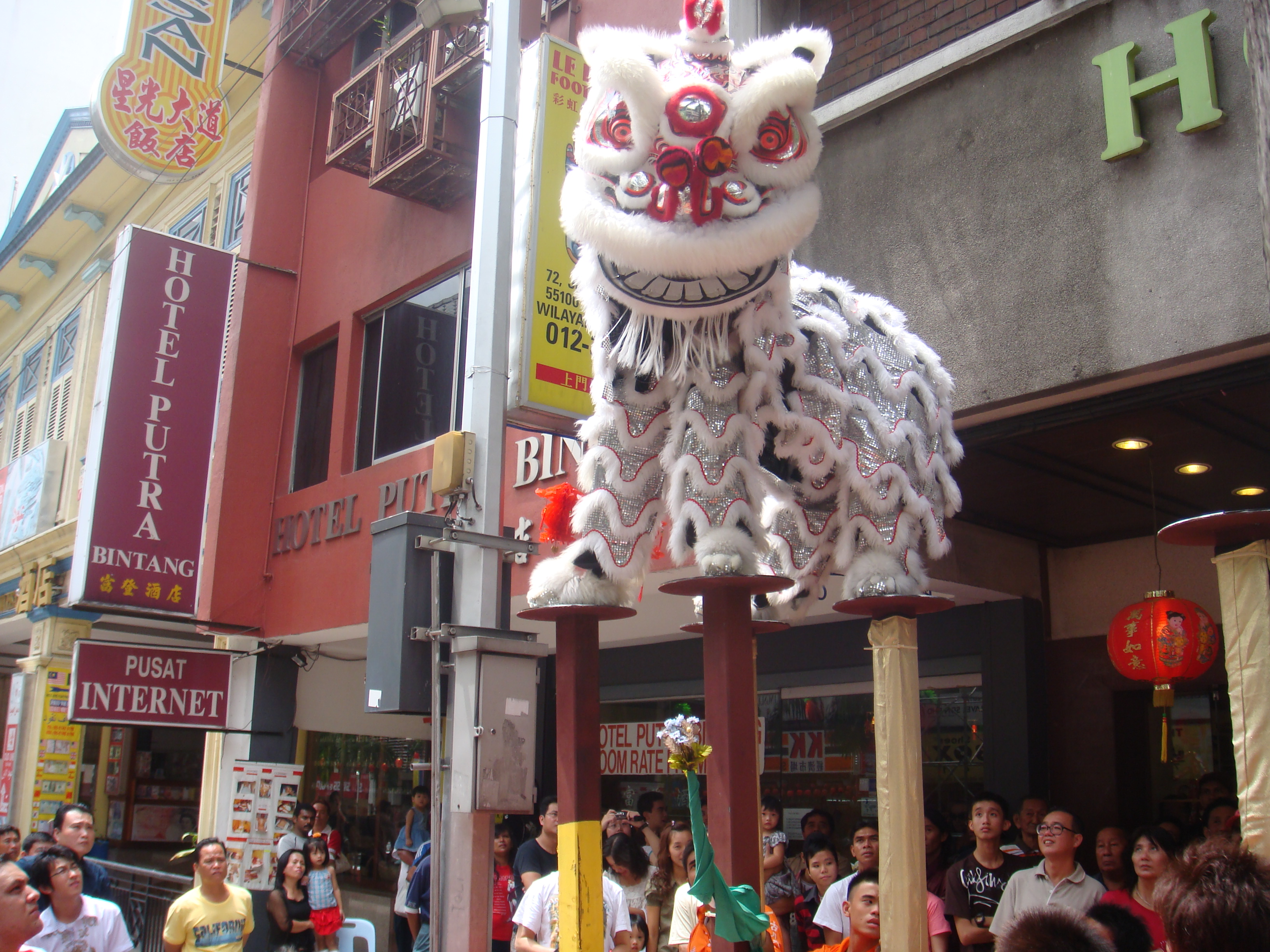
Lion dance in Malaysia's capital during the Chinese main festivity.

With the large presence of ethnic Chinese in the country nationwide, Chinese New Year is celebrated as a national public holiday. 13 states and three federal territories in the country celebrate with two days holidays. During the New Year, many Chinese living with their family in the urban areas will celebrate together, while some who may have family in rural areas will return for family reunions. Traditional dinner with the entire family is the most important aspect of the celebration and may include a traditional food tossing of yee sang, especially among the Cantonese. Elders will usually give the young a red envelope (ang pow or angpau). A variety of festival sweets are presented in the house for visitors. Most Chinese settlements and Chinatown streets will be decorated before the New Year with colorful lanterns. Dragon and lion dances will be performed with firecracker and fireworks shows also featured as part of the celebrations.

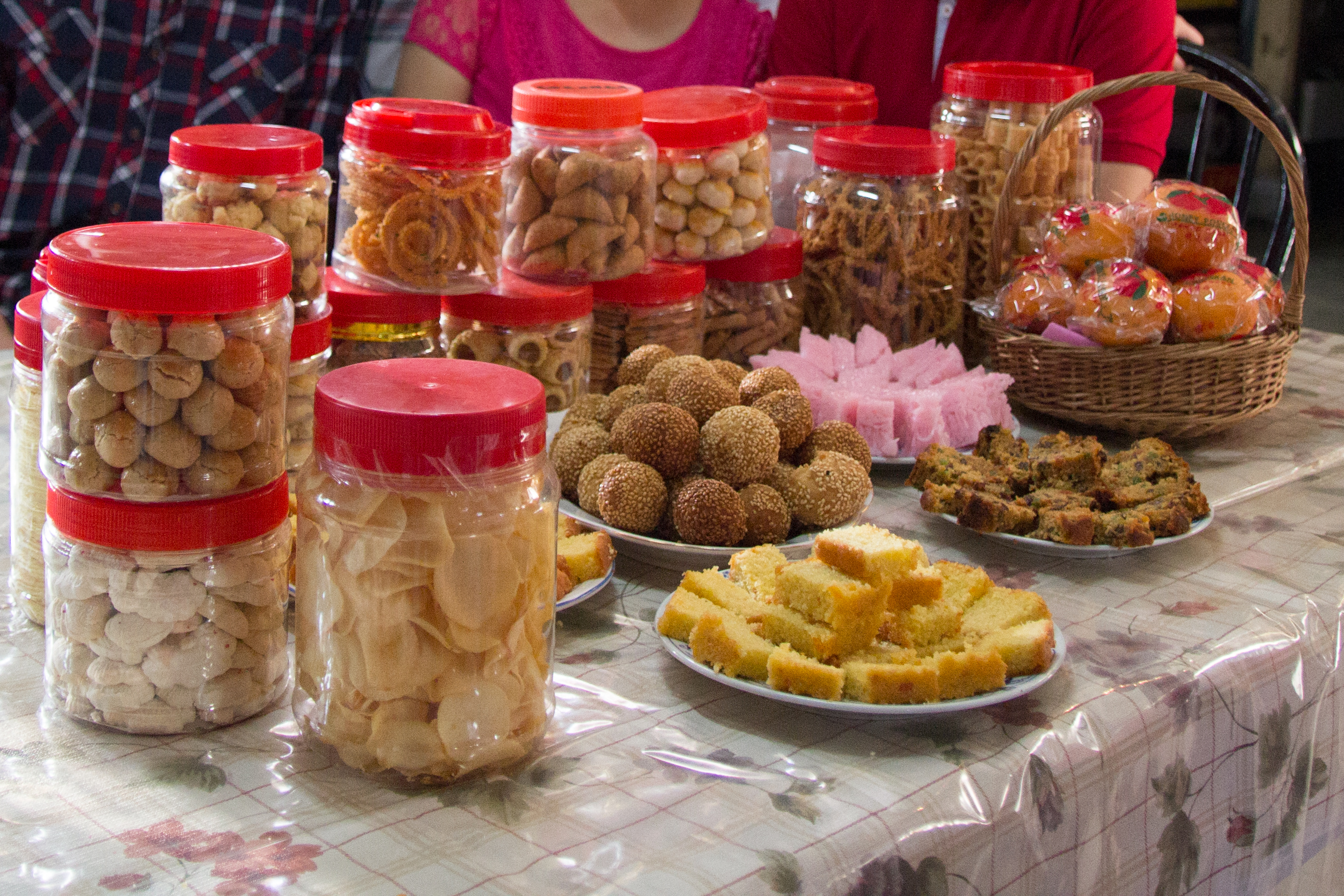
Aside from mandarin orange, various other snacks are presented for visitors throughout the Chinese New Year.

Chingay processions are also being held as part of the New Year festivities especially in Johor Bahru and Penang. Several other festivals are celebrated through the seasons in a year including the Dongzhi Festival, Dragon Boat Festival, Hungry Ghost Festival, Lantern Festival (Chap Goh Mei), Mid-Autumn Festival, Nine Emperor Gods Festival and Qingming Festival which originated from much of Chinese folk beliefs and traditional agricultural society. Throughout the festivals, especially for major Chinese festivals such as the New Year, Hungry Ghost, and Mid-Autumn, Chinese temples will organize cultural and religious activities. The Hungry Ghost Festival is generally not observed by most Dejiao (Zi) group in Malaysia which descended directly from Dejiao association in China, it is only mainly observed by three Zi associations in Kuala Lumpur (Zi Fang Ge), Pulau Ketam (Zi Bang Ge) and Butterworth (Zi Wei Gi) with the three calling the festival as Wanyuan Shenghui than Yulan Shanghui. The Mooncake Festival is celebrated through the Mid-Autumn Festival where there people will exchange and eat mooncake. Traditional Chinese weddings remain popular to some ethnic Chinese Malaysian couples even though most have preferred the Western-influenced wearing of white wedding dresses and black jackets.

=== Religion ===
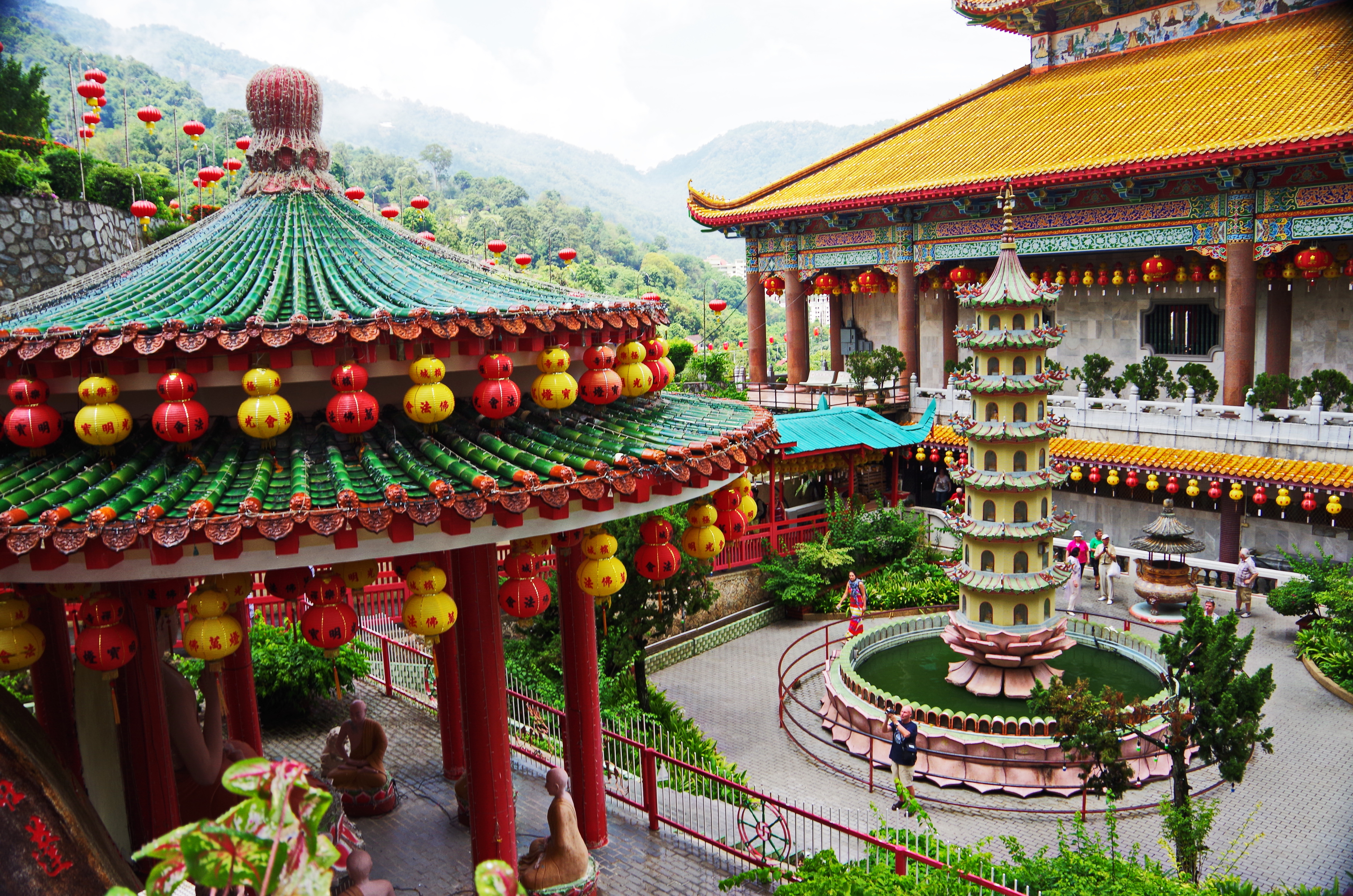
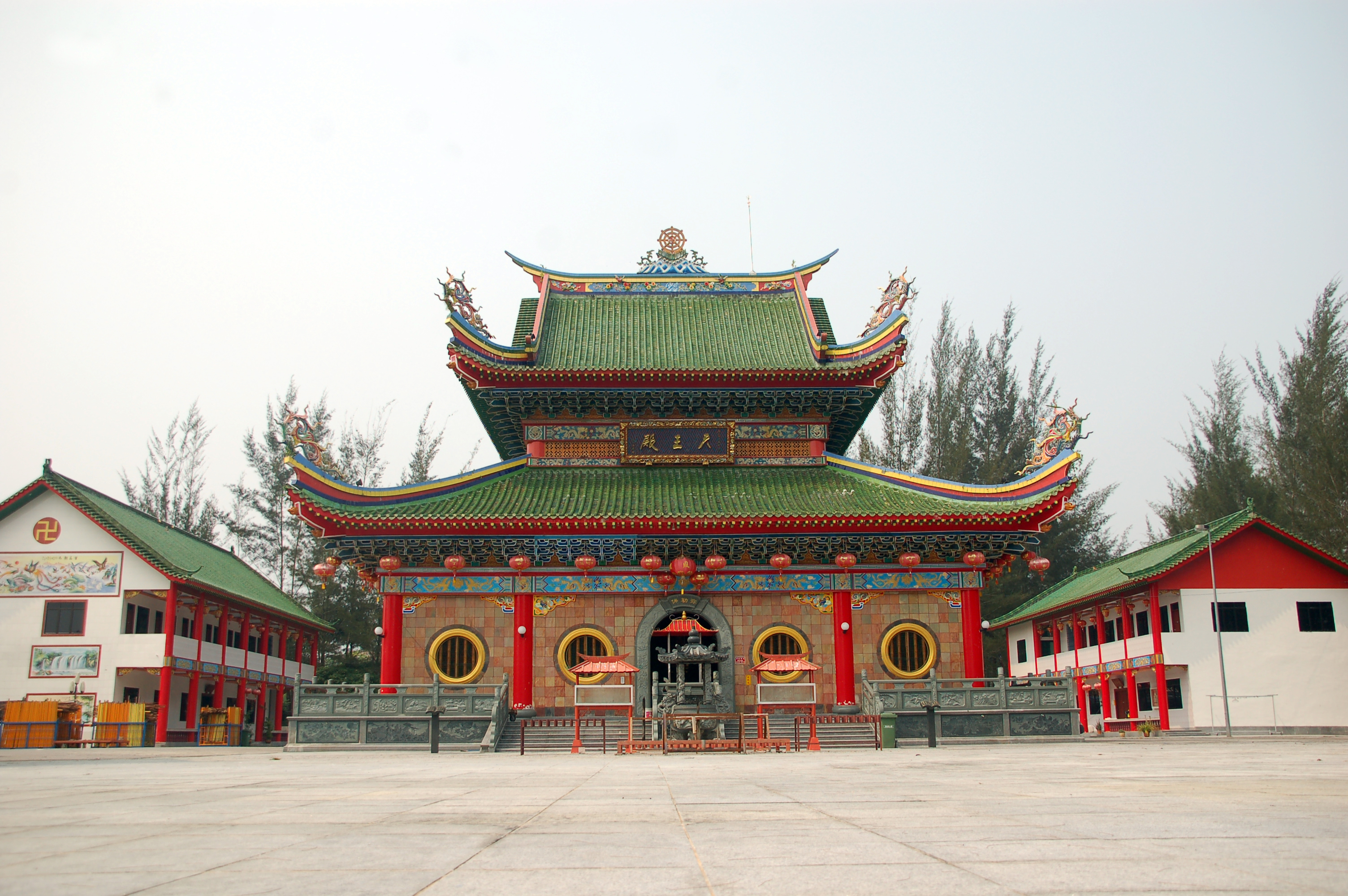
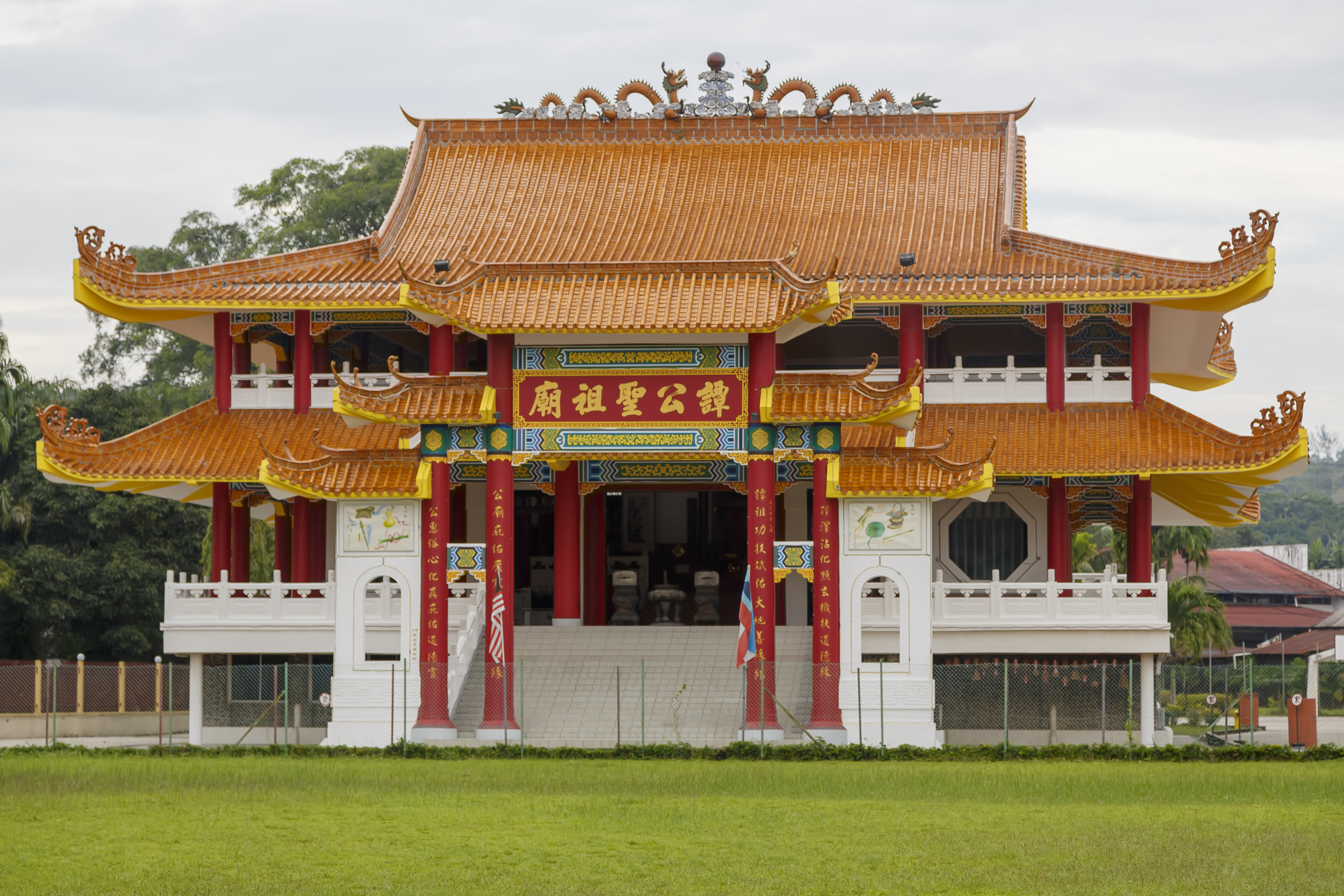
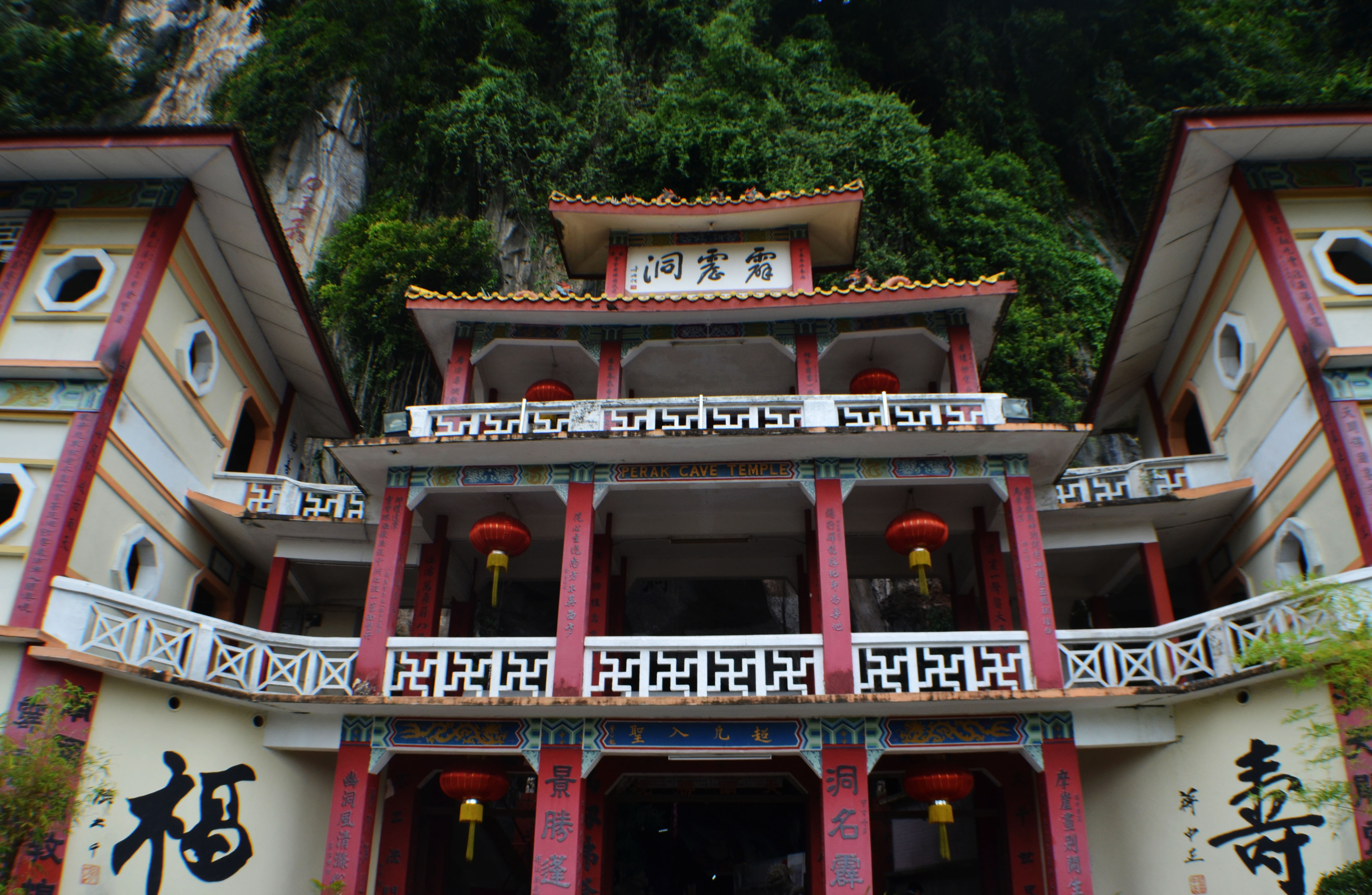
Chinese folk religion, Confucianism, Mahāyāna Buddhism and Taoism temples in Malaysia.
Religion of ethnic Chinese Malaysians (2010)
1. Buddhism (83.6%)
2. Christianity (11.1%)
3. Folk beliefs (3.40%)
4. Islam (0.70%)
5. No religion (0.80%)
6. Hinduism (0.20%)
7. Other religion (0.13%)
8. Unknown (0.17%)

Based on the 2000 Malaysian Census, 86.6% of ethnic Chinese Malaysians adhere to Buddhism and Chinese folk religion with numerous Chinese temples and shrines visible nationwide. More detailed statistics in 2010 found a total of 5,341,687 ethnic Chinese Malaysians adhere to Buddhism, 695,479 are Christians, 218,261 practising Confucianism, Taoism and other Chinese folk religious sects, 60,320 are Muslims, 42,048 are irreligious, 14,878 are Hindus, 11,387 with unknown religion while 8,576 practising other different religion. Among the common deities worshipped by ethnic Chinese Malaysians in temples are Guan Yu, Guanyin, Tua Pek Kong and Mazu.

Commonly found in ethnic Chinese homes and shops are altars installed for deities of their affinities together with ancestral worship. Most of the deities are of Chinese origin but it is still common to see a few local deities. Most, if not all cities in Malaysia include the presence of Chinese Buddhist temples and societies. However, there exists towns with only Buddhist statues, although some may have one or two other Chinese deities. Other Buddhist branches of Theravāda and various Tibetan traditions (Vajrayāna) also have Chinese members and some of the buildings of these branches were built with the funds and philanthropic efforts from local Chinese Buddhists, examples being the establishment of Buddhist Maha Vihara in Kuala Lumpur and Wat Chayamangkalaram in Penang. Unlike the institutional religion of Buddhism, Christianity and Islam, ethnic Chinese who follow traditional folk religion do not have separate names for their belief and practices, as similar to the indigenous Malaysians such as Iban and the Orang Asli. They describe their religious beliefs as either bai shen or bai fo (worshipping deities) which does usually include the worshipping of Buddha since Mahayana Buddhist deities are also commonly worshipped by the followers of Chinese traditional religion.

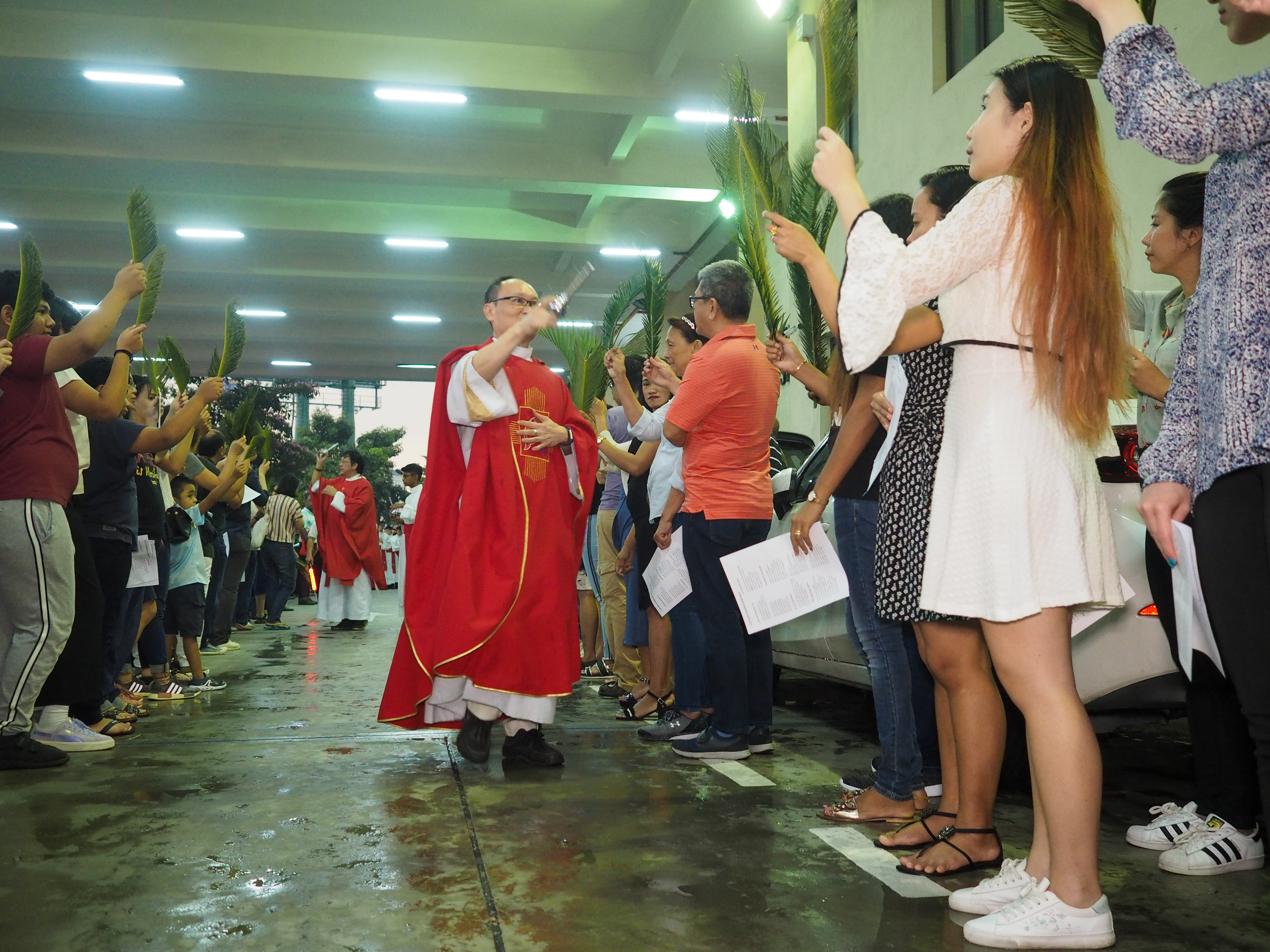
Malaysian Chinese Catholics during Palm Sunday at St Ignatius Church in Selangor.

Chinese Christians, including both Catholic and Protestant presence, are mainly visible with their active missionary activities especially among ethnic Chinese in East Malaysia, having a large proportion compared to other regions. The majority of Christians in West Malaysia also are of Chinese origin. Most early Chinese churches including Baptists, Methodists and Presbyterians have their origins from missionary migrants that introduced the missions established in China to Malaysia. The number of Chinese Muslims is very small compared to Chinese Christians since the latter religion is seen as more tolerant, mainly due to the general perception that embracing Islam in Malaysia is to become Malayised, in addition to the ethnic rivalry between Malay and Chinese that makes Islam as less desirable to ethnic Chinese Malaysians. A majority of Chinese Malaysians, especially those who have received Chinese education, follow Confucian values and to a lesser extent, Taoism. Some that are more traditional may hold more conservative views on filial piety and social relations, while also consulting Chinese horoscopes as well on Chinese geomancy of feng shui. Taoist activities gain increasing interests and significance among Chinese Malaysians although it is not deeply practiced.

== See also ==
- List of Malaysians of Chinese descent
- Chinese folk religion in Southeast Asia
- Malaysian folk religion
- Thai Chinese
- Singaporean Chinese
- Indonesian Chinese
- Bruneian Chinese
- Filipino Chinese
- Cambodian Chinese
- Burmese Chinese
- Laotian Chinese
- Vietnamese Chinese
- Korean Chinese
- China–Malaysia relations
- Hong Kong–Malaysia relations
- Malaysia–Taiwan relations

== Gallery ==
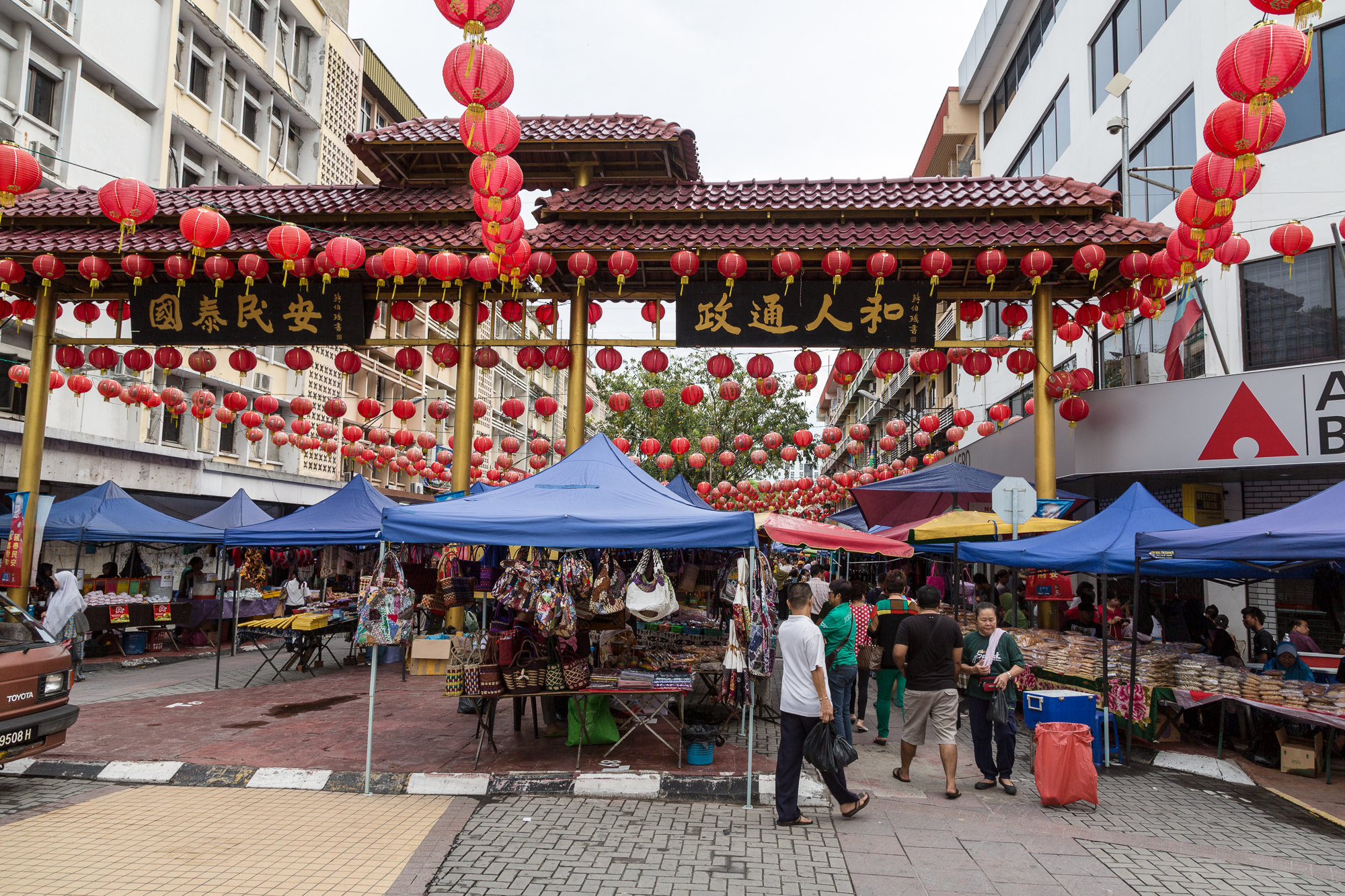
Gaya Street, Kota Kinabalu, a Chinatown in Sabah.

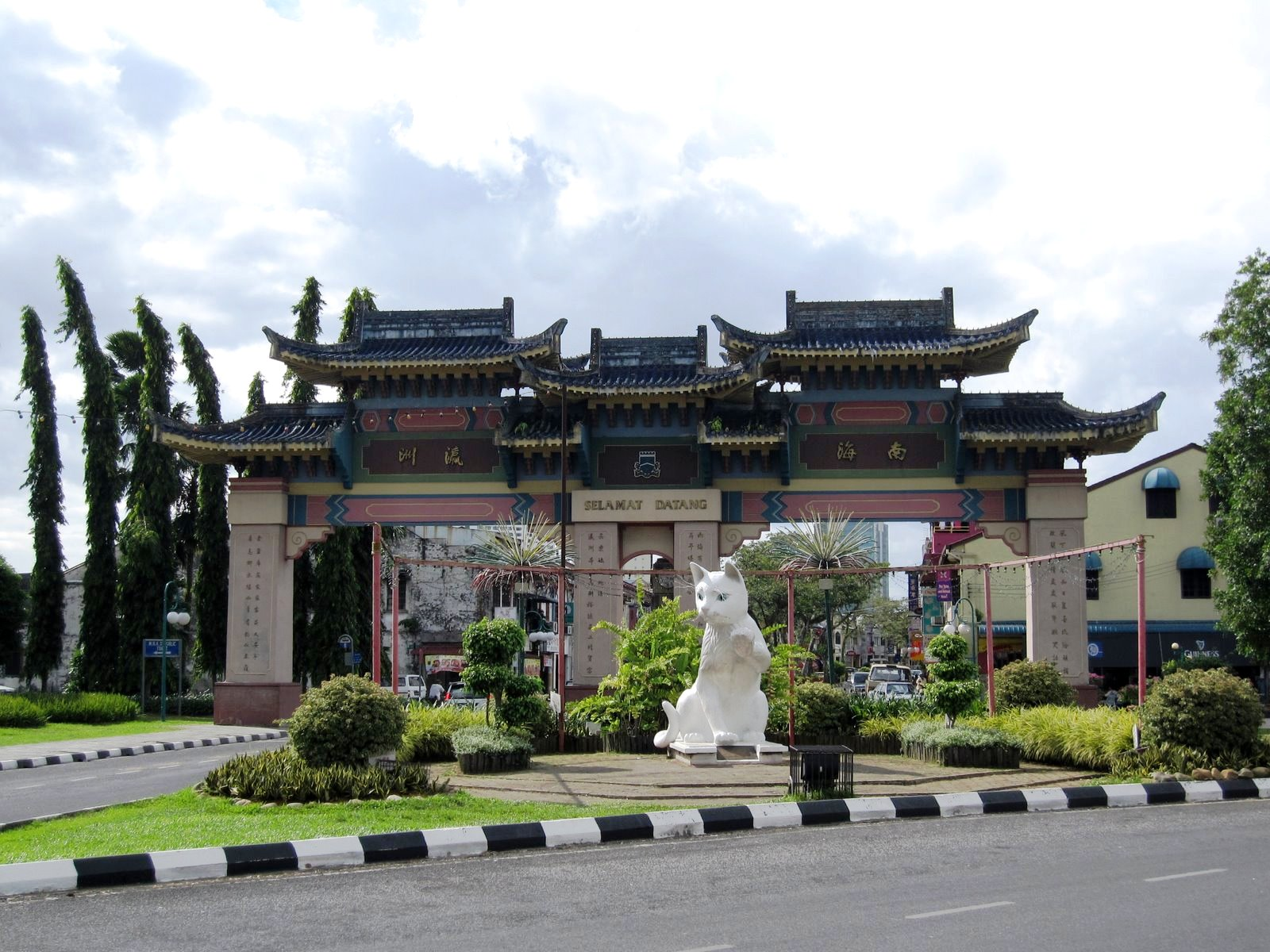
Chinatown, Kuching, a Chinatown in Kuching.

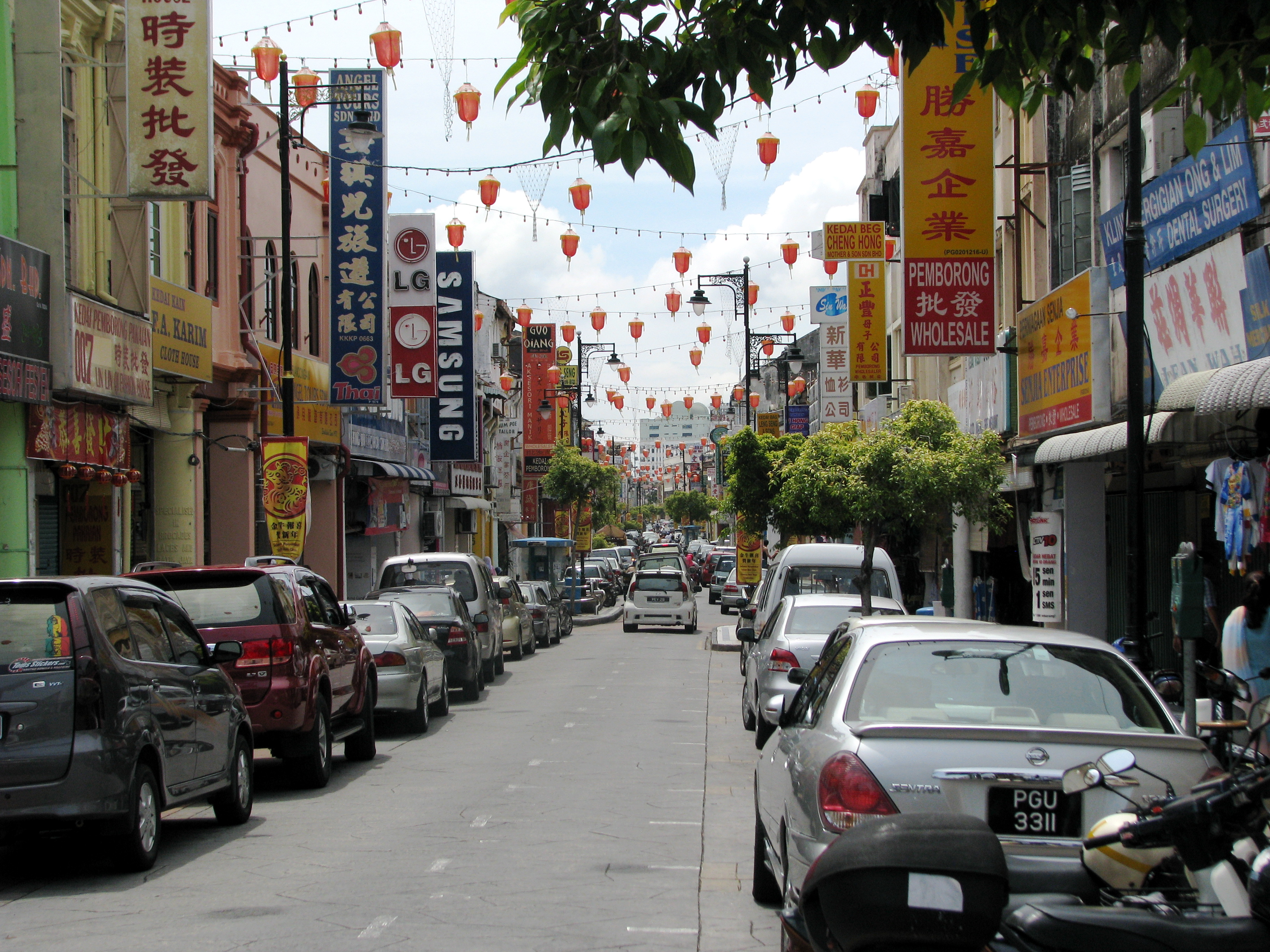
Kimberley Street is considered the heart of Chinatown in George Town, Penang.

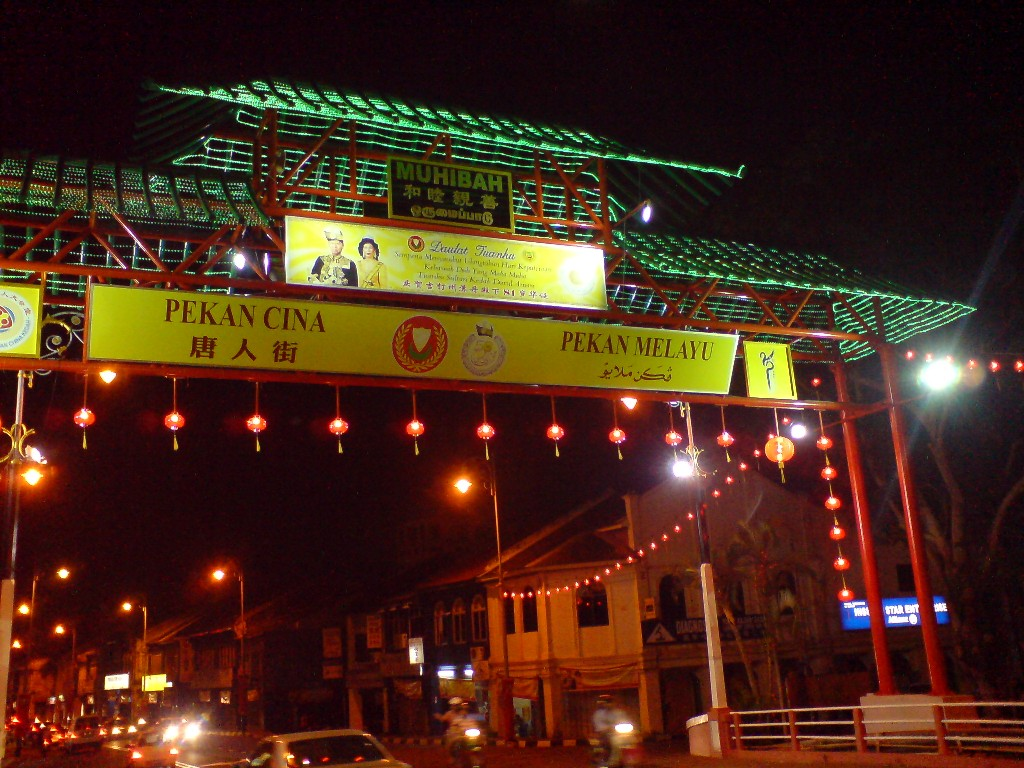
A Chinatown and "Malaytown" in Kedah.

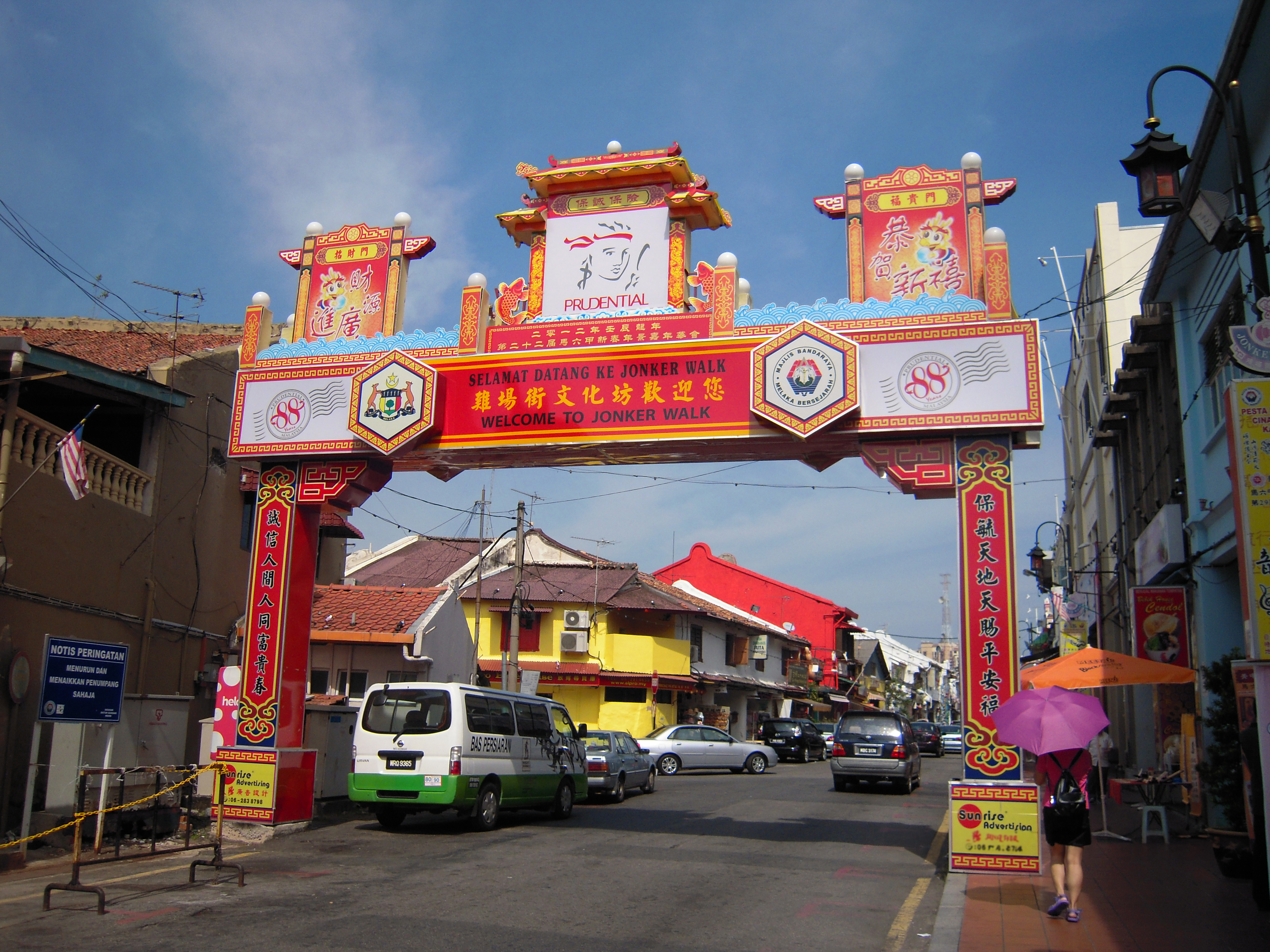
Jonker Walk, a Chinatown in Malacca.

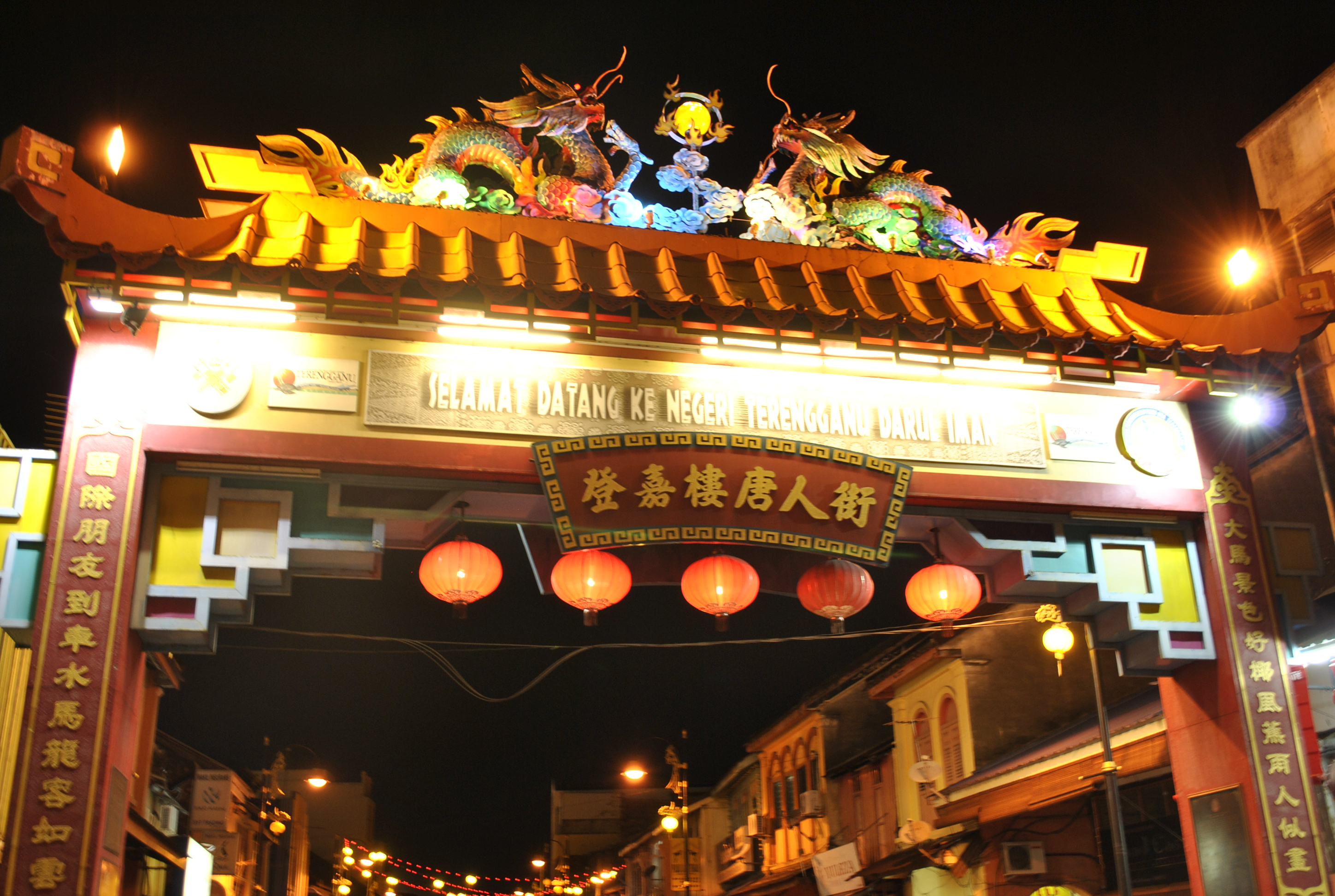
Chinatown Gateway, a Chinatown in Kuala Terengganu, Terrengganu.
