= Taoism in Malaysia =

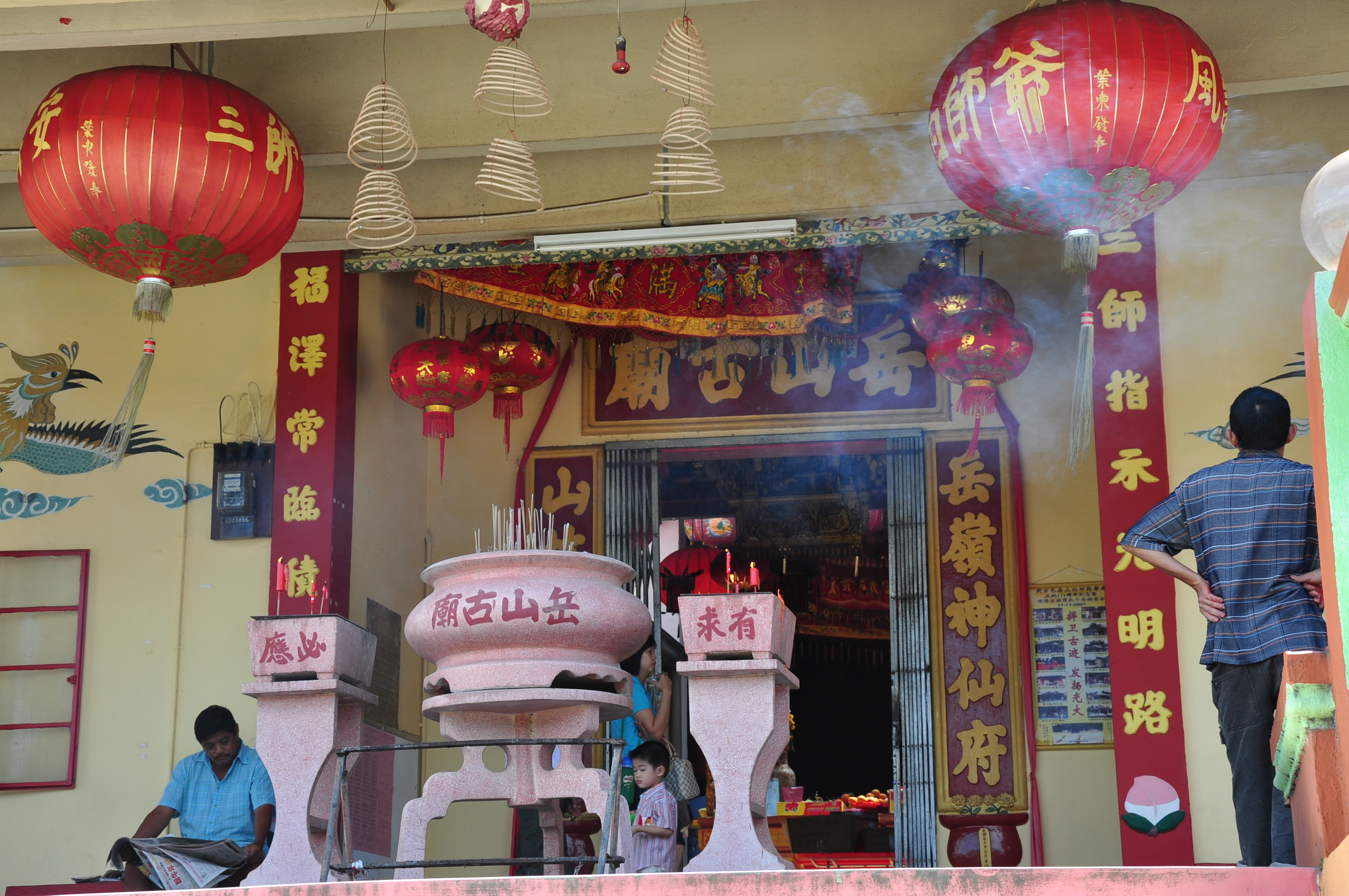
A Chinese temple in Kuala Lumpur

Taoism in Malaysia is followed by many Chinese. In general, owing to the decline in religious knowledge amongst the younger generations, many followers focus on rituals of Malaysian Chinese religion with little or no knowledge of Taoist scriptures and cultivation.

== History ==
Taoism arrived in Malaysia with Chinese settlers. Taoist practice later flourished as an increasing number of Chinese settled in Malaysia.

Many Taoist followers also worship ancestors and Bodhisattvas as these beliefs have traditionally enjoyed a peaceful coexistence, thereby leading to obscured delineation between them. There are also Chinese salvationist religions such as Wuweiism (無為教), the De religion which has also been well established in East Malaysia and Thailand, and Zhenkongism (真空教) that was popular among Hakka people before World War II for stopping people taking opium.

== See also ==
- Chinese folk religion in Southeast Asia
- Malaysian folk religion
- Zhizha & Religious goods store
- Zhengyi Taoism
- Taoism in Singapore
- Na Tuk Kong
