= Chinese folk religion in Southeast Asia =

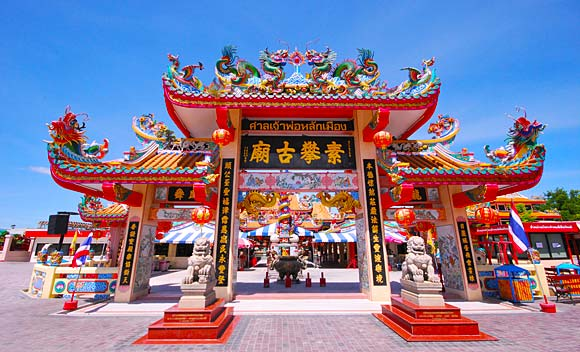
City God Temple of Suphan Buri, Thailand.

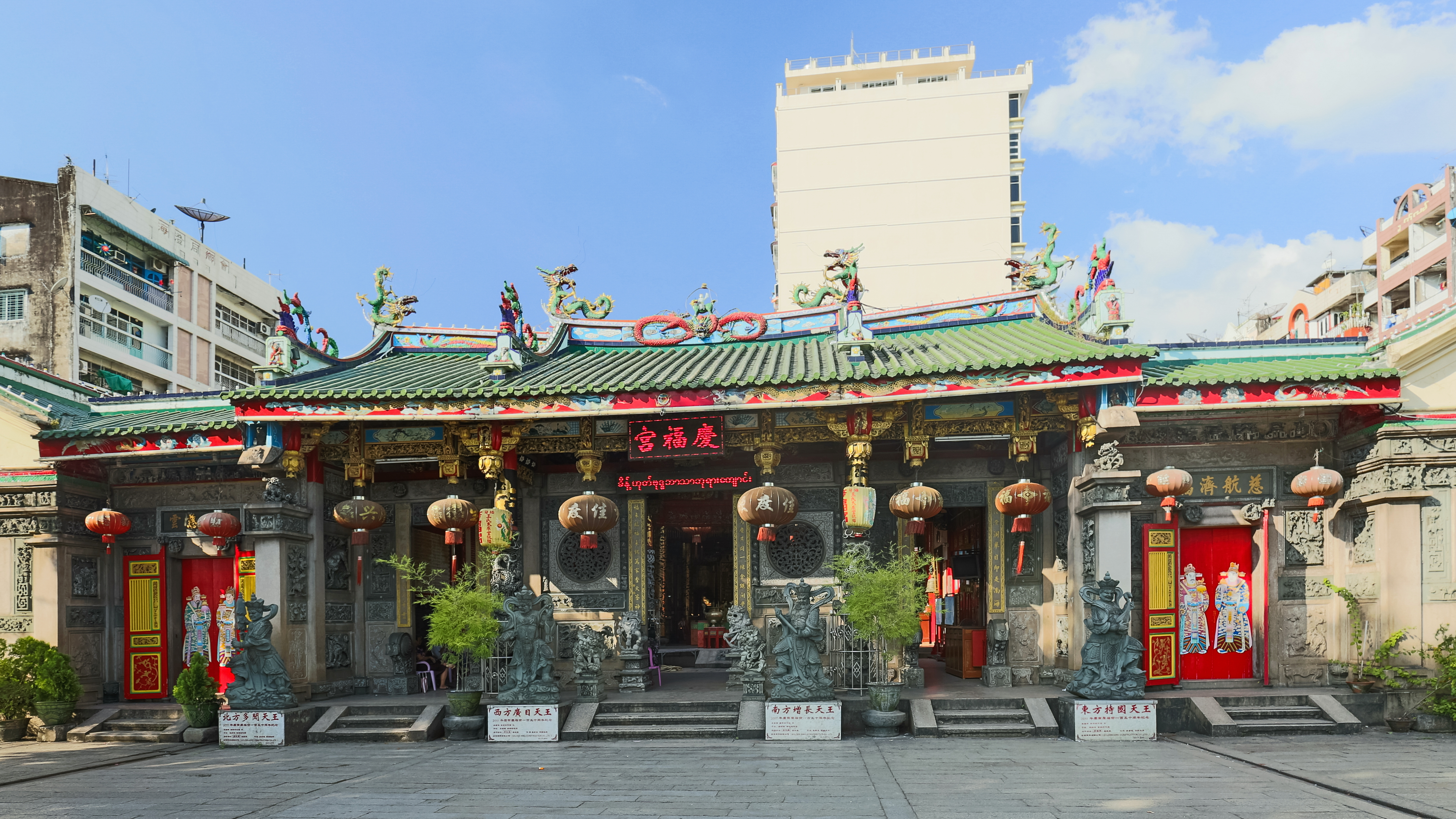
Kheng Hock Keong, of the Chinese community in Yangon, Burma, is a temple enshrining Mazu.

Chinese folk religion plays a dynamic role in the lives of the overseas Chinese who have settled in the countries of this geographic region, particularly Burmese Chinese, Singaporean Chinese, Malaysian Chinese, Thai Chinese, Indonesian Chinese and Hoa. Some Chinese Filipinos also still practice some Chinese traditional religions, besides Christianity of either Catholicism or Protestantism, with which some have also varyingly syncretized traditional Chinese religious practices. Chinese folk religion, the ethnic religion of Han Chinese, "Shenism" was especially coined referring to its Southeast Asian expression; another Southeast Asian name for the religion is the Sanskrit expression Satya Dharma (literally "Truth Law").

The Chinese folk religion of Southeast Asia is markedly typified by the interaction with Malay indigenous religions (Malaysian and Indonesian folk religion), the adoption of gods of Hindu derivation, such as Brahma, Ganesha and Hanuman, and also syncretism with Christianity in the Philippines. The philosophical forms of Confucianism and Taoism are followed, and organised forms of the Chinese folk faith, such as the Church of Virtue, Yiguandao and Zhenkongism, have taken significant foothold among Southeast Asian Chinese.

In Singapore about 11% of the total population is Taoist, including the 14.4% of Chinese Singaporeans identifying as Taoists. In Malaysia, around 10% of Chinese Malaysians practice Chinese folk religions, corresponding to around 1% of the country's population. However, numbers may be significantly larger since many folk religious Chinese register as "Buddhists" for census purposes. In Indonesia, Taosu Agung Kusumo, leader of the Majelis Agama Tao Indonesia, claims there are 5 million Taoist followers in the country as of 2009.

== By country ==
=== Indonesia ===
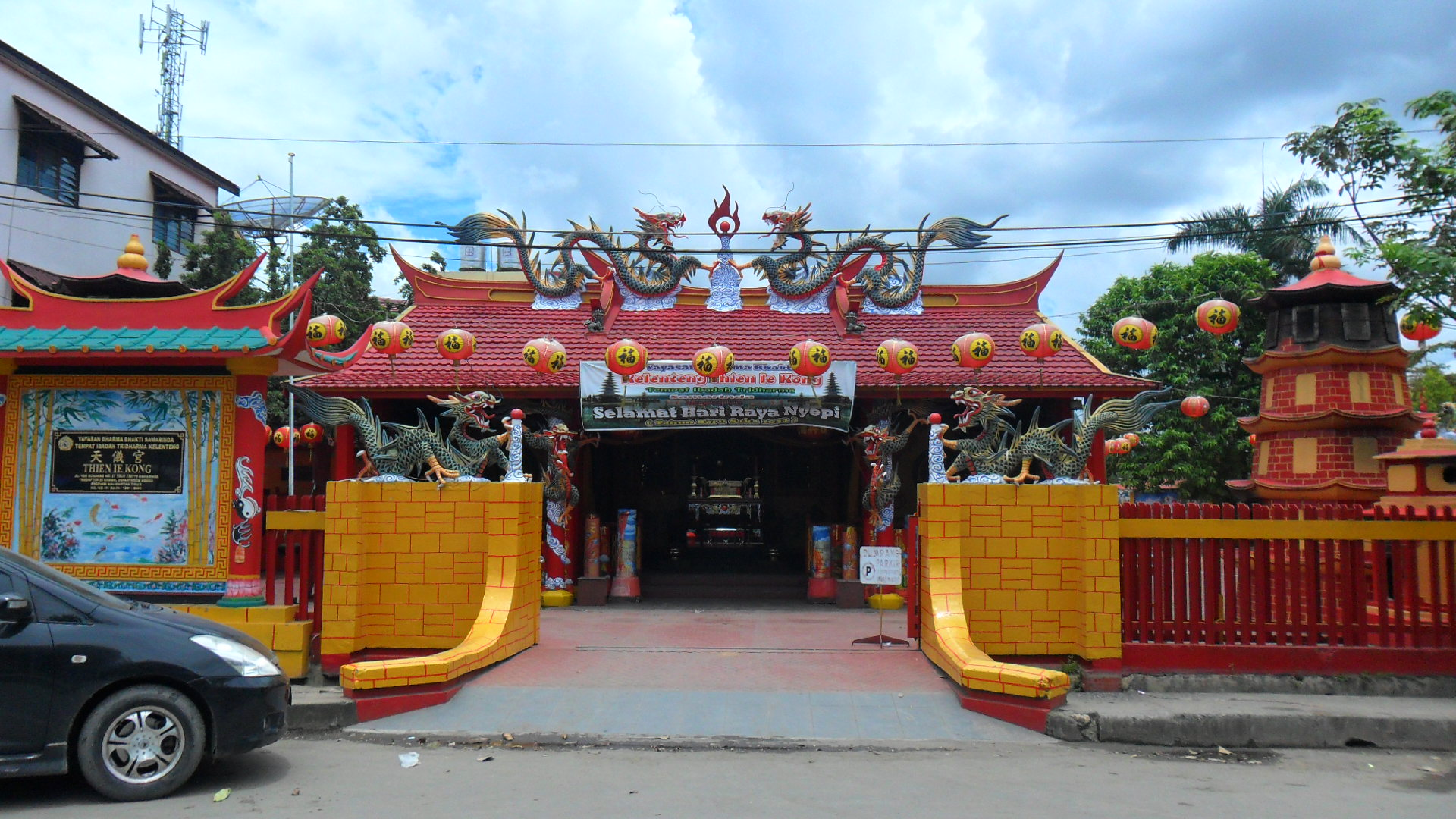
Kelenteng Thien Ie Kong (Temple of the Olden Lord of Heaven) in Samarinda, East Kalimantan province of Indonesia.

The Chinese folk religion of the Chinese Indonesians is named "Confucianism" or "Satya Dharma", and Chinese temples are called klenteng or vihara in the Indonesian language. It is officially recognised by the government as Agama Khonghucu or Religion of Confucius, which was chosen because of the political condition in Indonesia before the 1998 end of the rule of Suharto, who had forbidden all forms of Chinese religions; Indonesian Chinese could embrace only the five officially recognised religions, and many of them eventually converted to Buddhism or Christianity. Chinese Indonesians had their culture and religious rights restored only after the fourth president of Indonesia, Abdurrahman Wahid, issued a regulation that recognised "Confucianism" among the legal religions of the country. He said that:

All religions insist on peace. From this we might think that the religious struggle for peace is simple... but it is not. The deep problem is that people use religion wrongly in pursuit of victory and triumph. This sad fact then leads to conflict with people who have different beliefs.

The first precept of Pancasila (the Five Basic Principles of the Indonesian state) stipulates belief in the one and only God. The Confucian philosophy is able to fulfill this, for Confucius mentioned only one God in his teaching, the Heaven or Shangdi. The Heaven possess the characteristic of Yuan Heng Li Zhen, or Omnipresent, Omnipotent, Omnibenevolent, Just.

The Master said, "Great indeed was Yao as a sovereign! How majestic was he! It is only Heaven that is grand, and only Yao corresponded to it. How vast was his virtue! The people could find no name for it. How majestic was he in the works which he accomplished! How glorious in the elegant regulations which he instituted!" (VIII, xix, tr. Legge 1893:214)

Another movement in Indonesia is the Tridharma (Sanskrit: "law of the three"), syncretising elements of different religions, the Chinese three teachings amongst others. After the fall of Suharto rule it is undergoing a process of systematisation of doctrines and rituals. Tridharma temples always consist of three main rooms: the front room for Tian or God, the middle for the main deity of the temple, and the back room for the Founders of three religions and their pantheon: Confucius, Laozi, and Buddha. Several big Chinese population cities such as Medan, Batam, Bagansiapiapi and Singkawang have significant numbers of Chinese folk religion followers. There are also many Taoist associations in Indonesia.

Some local deities which are not known outside Indonesia includes Tan Hu Cin Jin from Banyuwangi-Bali, Tan Tik Siu from Tulungagung, Tan Oei Ji Sian Seng or Gi Yong Kong from Rembang-Lasem, and Tey Hai Cin Jin who is worshiped in the coastal cities of East and Middle Java.

=== Malaysia ===
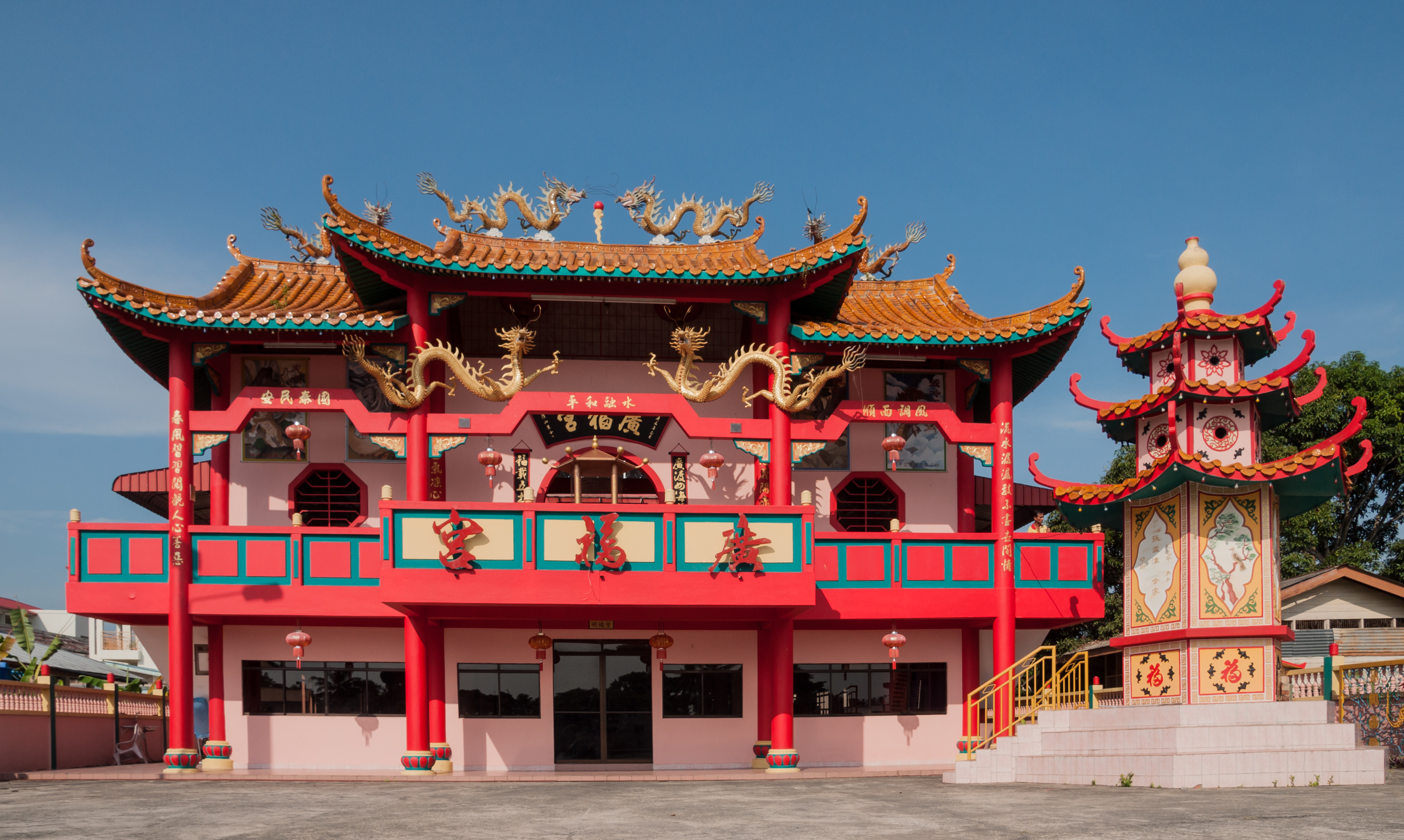
Kwong Fook Kung Temple, a Chinese folk temple in Papar, Sabah.

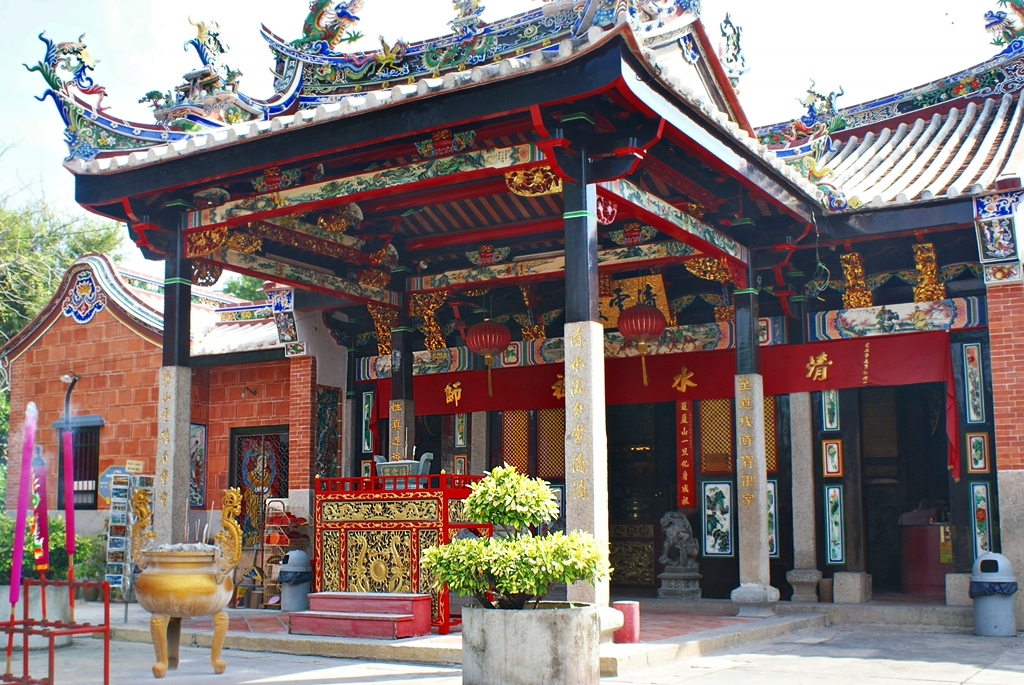
The Snake Temple in Penang, Malaysia, hosting a Chinese cult of the snake that is unique to the area.

In Malaysia the Malaysian Chinese constitute a large segment of the population, mostly adherents of Mahayana Buddhism. The Chinese traditional religion has a relatively significant registered following in the states of Sarawak (6%) and Penang (5%). Many other folk religious Chinese register as "Buddhists" in government surveys. Chinese temples are called tokong in the Malaysian language.

The Chinese folk religion was brought into Malaysia by Chinese emigrants in the 15th century, with small settlements and a Temple that were established in Malacca by Hokkien traders, but it was not until the 19th century that there was a mass migration of Chinese. They built temples dedicated to their Deities, schools, and cemeteries for those who died. The Chinese migration during the tin and gold mining days, which were a result of high demand for these products, prompted the need for temples for practices and religious rituals.

Clan organisations in the Chinese immigrant society were important, where surnames, dialect, locality and trade mattered. The Cantonese, Hokkien, Teochew and Hakka, respectively, formed lineage associations and Kongsi, such as the Khoo Kongsi and Eng Chuan Tong Tan Kongsi, which are grassroots supporters of Chinese overseas communities.

A prominent cult is that of Tua Pek Kong (大伯公 Dabo Gong), which has incorporated the cult of the Na Tuk Kong (拿督公 Nadu Gong) and Datuk Keramat of local Malay origin. Other native and Thai Deities have been incorporated into the pantheon.

=== Thailand ===
Thailand has a large population of Thai Chinese, people of Chinese or partial Chinese origin (up to 14% of the population of the country). Most of those who follow Buddhism have been integrated into the Theravada Buddhist tradition of the country, with only a negligible minority still practicing Chinese Buddhism. However, many others have retained the Chinese folk religions and Taoism. Despite the large number of followers and temples, and although they are practiced freely, these religions have no state recognition, their temples are not counted as places of worship, and their followers are counted as "Theravada Buddhists" in officially released religious figures. In Thailand, Chinese temples are called sanchao (Thai: ศาลเจ้า).

As in other Southeast Asian countries, the Chinese folk religion of Thailand has developed local features, including the worship of local gods. Major Chinese festivals such as the Nian, Zhongqiu and Qingming are widely celebrated, especially in Bangkok, Phuket, and other parts of Thailand where there are large Chinese populations.

The Chinese in the city of Phuket are noted for their nine-day vegetarian festival between September and October. During the festive season, devotees will abstain from meat, and mortification of the flesh by Chinese mediums is also commonly seen, along with rites devoted to the worship of Tua Pek Kong. Such traditions were developed during the 19th century in Phuket by the local Chinese with influences from Thai culture.

=== Singapore ===
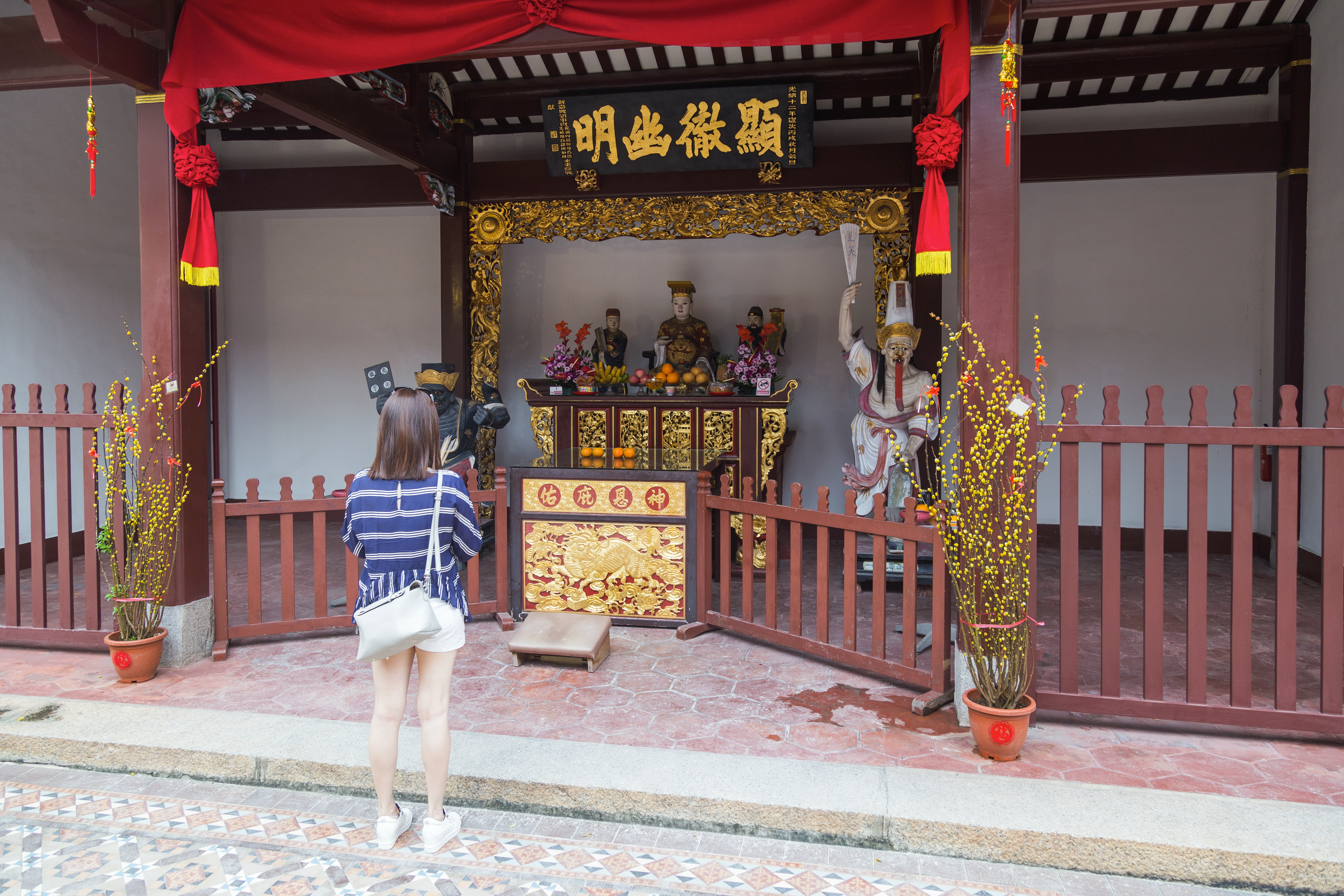
Girl praying to the City God at Thian Hock Keng Temple in Telok Ayer Street, Singapore.

Sizeable number of Chinese Singaporeans practice Taoism, which in the city state is used as a synecdoche for broader Chinese folk religion. Taoists in Singapore worship many Deities that frequently are embodied by historical ancestors and are subject to a complex Taoist hierarchy of veneration. They also worship some deities of common origins, notably the Jade Emperor, Xuan Tian Shang Di, Lord Guan, and Tian Shang Sheng Mu. Other deities that are venerated and frequently kept at home as auspicious images include the Fu, Lu, and Shou. Caishen is also popularly venerated by many Chinese businessmen. However, certain deities are worshipped by a particular dialect group, and may not share a common devotion with other Chinese dialect groups. One interesting example is Qing Shui Zhu Shi (祖師公); this particular deity is mainly worshipped by the Hokkien, particularly from Anxi County. Buddhist Bodhisattvas like Guanyin or Di Zang Wang are popularly worshipped in Singapore. Deities from other ethnicities such as Phra Phrom, Na Tuk Kong (拿督公) or Datuk Keramat are also venerated.

Adherents of Taoism or Chinese Folk Religion usually place their main altars/shrines inside their living room. This is more often seen among Chinese families, rather than individuals. The main Gods/Deities are enshrined at the centre of the top altar, and a tablet dedicated to the Guardians of Earth/Dizhushen (地主神) is placed at the bottom altar. Ancestral tablets are usually placed beside the statues/images of the main Gods/Deities at the top altar. Often, an incense burner to burn incense sticks is placed in front of the Gods/Deities, and a separate, smaller incense burner is placed in front of the ancestral tablet. Oil lamps may also be placed at altars, and fruit or flower offerings are also placed in front of the Gods/Deities as offerings. Some families may also have an altar dedicated to the Kitchen God (灶君) inside the kitchen.

Adherents typically install a small, red and gold altar or tablet outside the house bearing the inscription "The Heavenly Official Bestows Blessings" (天官賜福). This specific tablet is dedicated to the Heavenly Official (天官大帝), one of the Three Great Emperor-Officials (三官大帝) who oversees the granting of fortune, and should not be confused for the Jade Emperor.

Alongside this, or sometimes placed independently, is a small incense burner filled with ash dedicated to Tian Gong (天公)/Jade Emperor (玉皇大帝). In the ritual order of worship, this outdoor station is always the first point of veneration.

After they have worshipped toward the Heaven representing Tian Gong/Jade Emperor, they will proceed to worship at the main altar to the Gods/Deities, then to the ancestral tablets, and eventually to the Guardians of Earth/Dizhushen. The smoke emitted from burning incense sticks symbolizes their devotion and prayer, and at times requests to the Gods/Deities.

=== Philippines ===
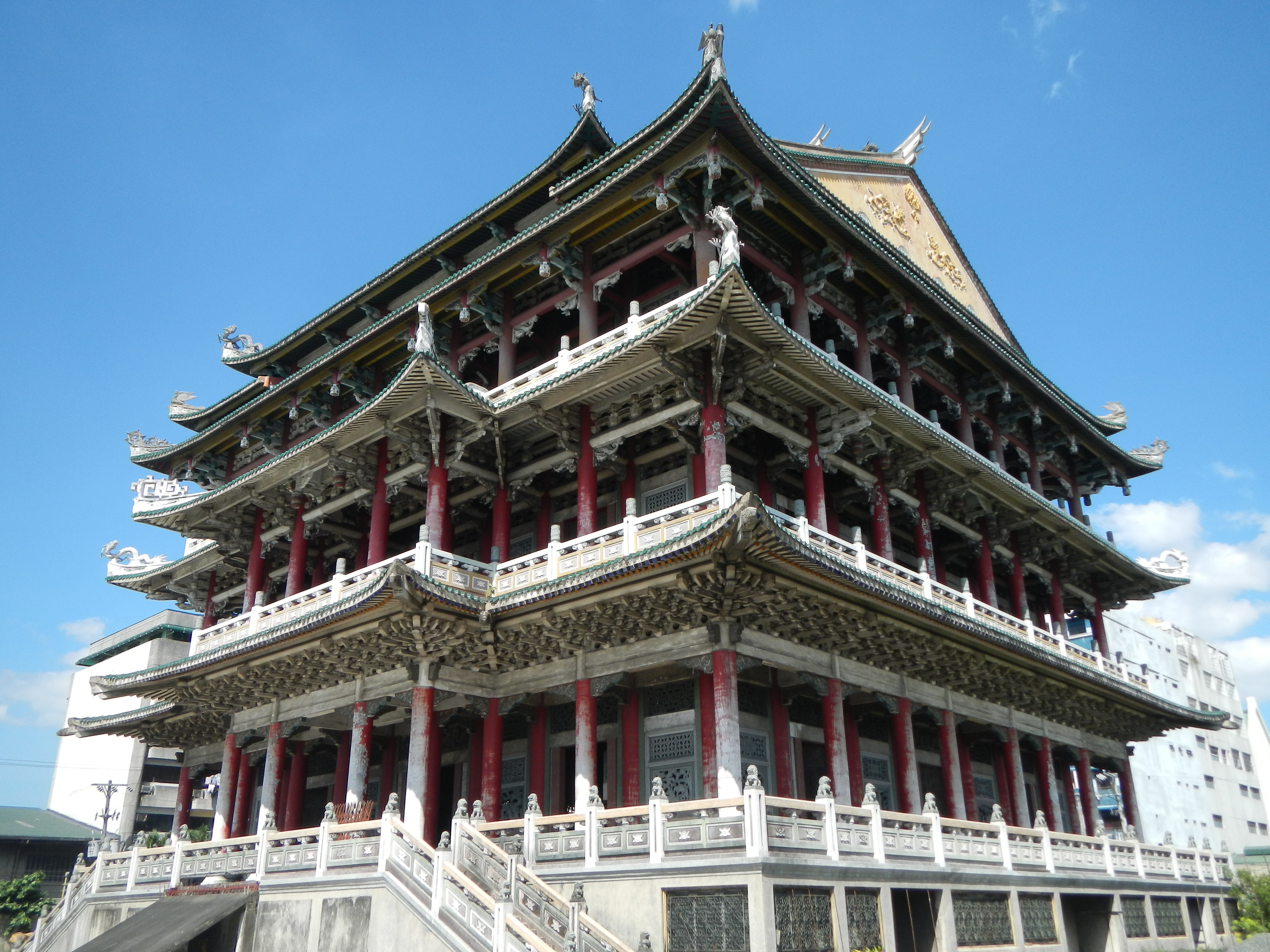
Thai To Taoist Temple in Caloocan, Metro Manila, Philippines

A small number of Chinese Filipinos (2%) continue to practise traditional Chinese religions solely. Mahayana Buddhism, specifically Chinese Pure Land Buddhism, Taoism, and ancestral worship (including Confucianism) are the traditional Chinese beliefs that continue to have adherents among Chinese Filipinos.

Buddhist and Taoist temples can be found where Chinese Filipinos live, especially in urban areas like Metro Manila. (Note: most prominently the Buddhist Seng Guan Temple in Tondo, Manila.) Veneration of the Guanyin (觀音) or Mazu (媽祖), known locally in Hokkien as Kuan-im (Hokkien Chinese: 觀音; Pe̍h-ōe-jī: Koan-im) and Ma-cho (Hokkien Chinese: 媽祖; Pe̍h-ōe-jī: Má-chó͘) respectively, either in its pure form or as a representation of the Mary Mother Of God, is practised by many Chinese Filipinos. For example, Mazu / Ma-cho is sometimes known or identified as "Our Lady of Caysasay", which is also an emanation of the Blessed Virgin Mary. Both are considered emanations of each other, with the images of Our Lady of Antipolo and Our Lady of the Abandoned as additional emanations, as all four are related to water and/or travel. Additionally, Guan Yu is also sometimes known among Chinese Filipinos as "Santo Santiago" (St. James) or in Hokkien as "Te Ya Kong" (Hokkien Chinese: 帝爺公; Pe̍h-ōe-jī: Tè-iâ-kong) or "Kuan Kong" (Hokkien Chinese: 關公; Pe̍h-ōe-jī: Koan-kong). Chinese Filipinos have also established indigenous religious denominations like Bell Church (钟教), which is a syncretic religion with an ecumenical and interfaith orientation. There are several prominent Chinese temples like Seng Guan Temple (Buddhist) in Manila, Ma-Cho Temple (Mazu worship) in San Fernando, La Union, Cebu Taoist Temple in Cebu City, Lon Wa Buddhist Temple in Davao City, and many more distributed around the country.

Around half (40%) of all Filipino Chinese, regardless of religion, still claim to practise ancestral worship. Chinese Filipinos, especially the older generations, have a tendency to pay respects to their deceased ancestors at least once a year, by going to the temple, the local Chinese cemetery or traditional burial grounds, such as the Manila Chinese Cemetery for those in Metro Manila, often burning candles, incense and joss paper money, presenting offerings like certain fruits or fruit juice tetra packs to the deceased, and decorating the tombstones, mausoleums, and ancestral tablets with joss paper. Chinese Filipino mausoleums or burial grounds frequently have altars for Houtu (后土), where candles and incense are lit.

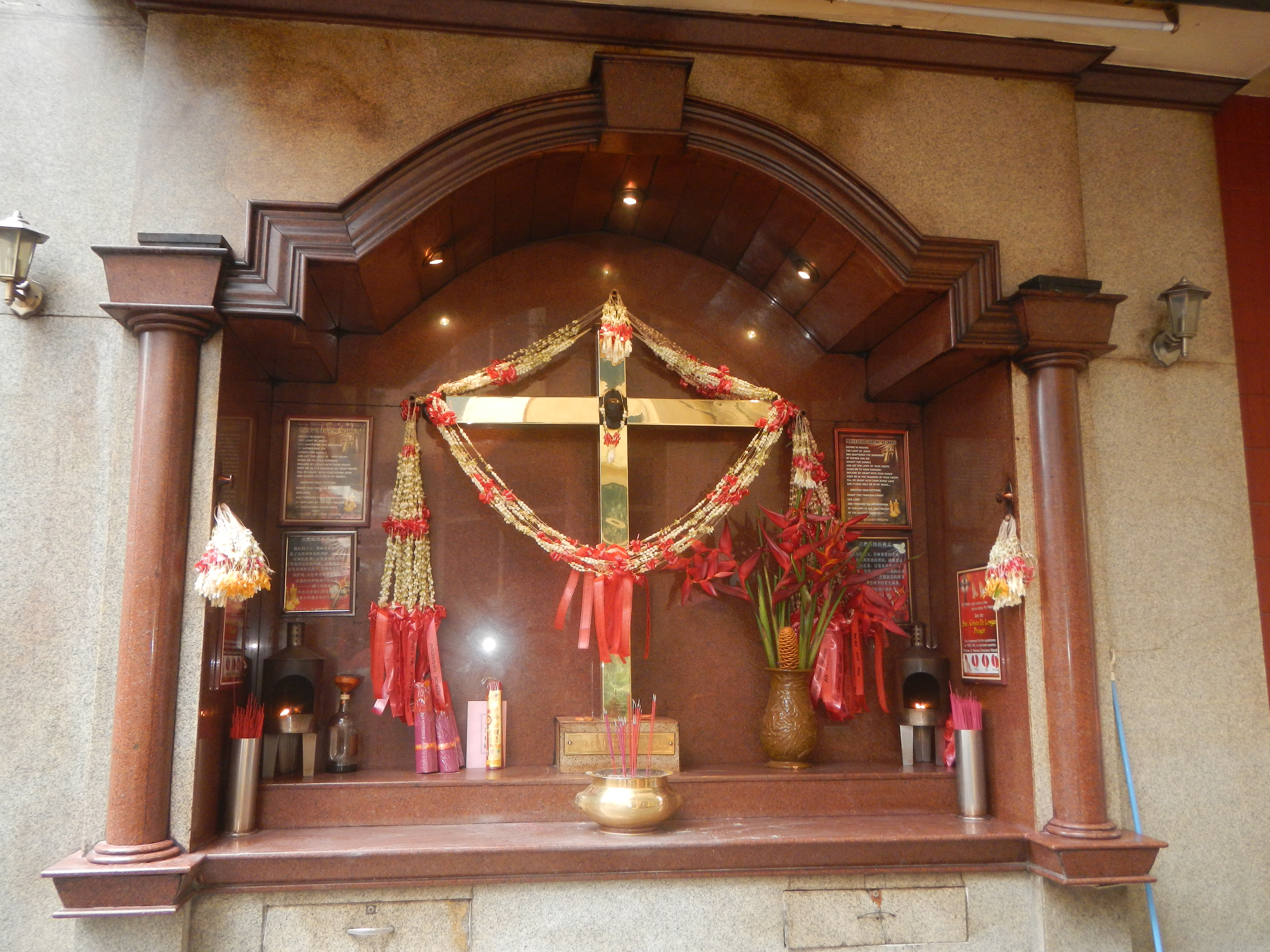
Santo Cristo de Longos Shrine (Ongpin St, Binondo, Manila), with joss sticks

Since most Chinese Filipinos practice Christianity, such as Catholicism or Protestantism, there is also a unique religious syncretism that is found in many Chinese Filipino homes. For Catholic Chinese Filipinos, some have altars bearing Catholic images such as the Santo Niño (Child Jesus) as well as statues of the Buddha and Taoist gods or other deities like the Three Deities in their homes, often decorated with Sampaguita garlands. It is not unheard of to venerate the Blessed Virgin Mary using joss sticks (Tao and Buddhist incense sticks) and other traditional offerings, much as one would do for Guan Yin or Mazu. In general for both Catholic and Protestant Christian Chinese Filipinos, it is normal in many households to have traditional Chinese statues and figurines like the Fat Buddha, the Three Deities, the Lucky Fu(福) Cat, the Money Frog, Chinese couplets, or other such traditional Chinese paraphernalia for the purposes of inviting good fortune, luck, and prosperity, while at the same time praying to God and conducting Bible study in the same household or room and having Christian symbols, Bible verses, and other such Catholic or Protestant Christian paraphernalia posted around the household.

=== Vietnam ===
Many Vietnamese people and Hoa people (Han Chinese of Vietnam) practice Chinese folk religion, Buddhism and Vietnamese folk religion syncretically.

== Features ==
=== Organised traditions ===
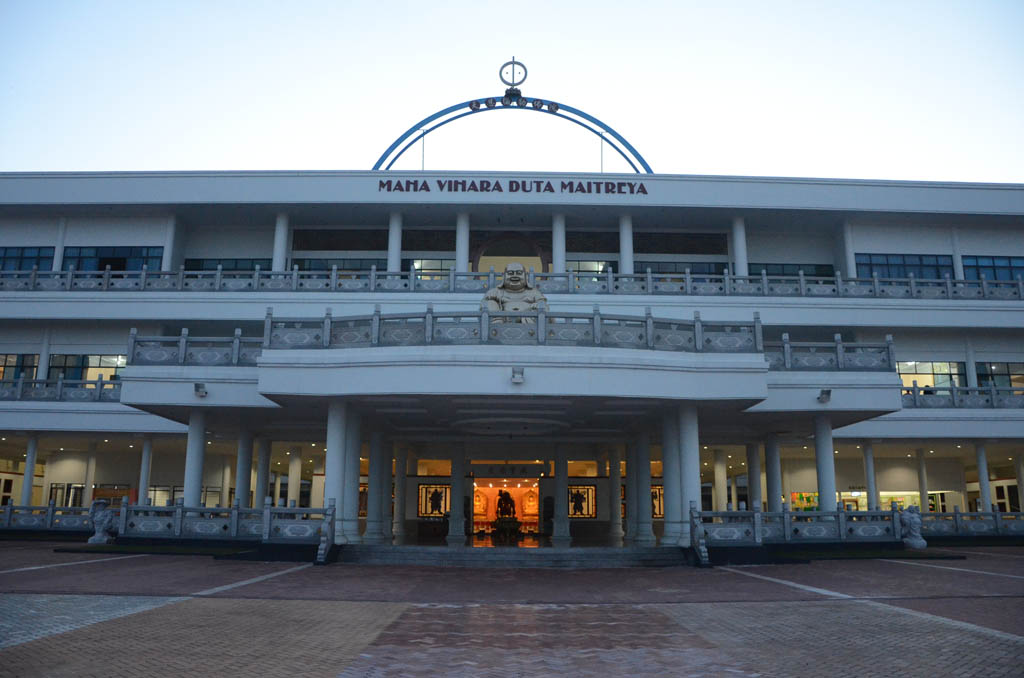
Maha Vihara Duta Maitreya is a Yiguandao temple in Batam, Indonesia. The deity Maitreya is represented by the statue on the porch roof.

Some organised sects stemming from Chinese practises have been active among Southeast Asian Chinese. They include especially De jiao ("religion of virtue"), Zhenkong jiao ("Teachings of True Emptiness") and Yiguandao ("Consistent Way").

=== Southeast Asian Chinese pantheon ===
The names of the gods are in transcribed Mandarin or certain Chinese dialects spoken by Southeast Asian Chinese populations:

- Thin Kong (天公) "Lord of Heaven" also known as the Jade Emperor
- Xuan Tian Shang Di (玄天上帝) or Siong Teh Gong (上帝公), Powerful Deity and was known as the Patron Deity of Ming Dynasty
- Hou Tu (后土) or Di Mu Niang Niang (地母娘娘), known as Goddess Queen of the Earth
- Xi Wang Mu (西王母), an ancient deity and was highly honored
- Dou Mu Yuan Jun (斗母元君), Mother Goddess of the Big Dipper or Lady Mother of the Chariot
- Kew Ong Yah (九皇爷), Nine Emperor Gods who symbolized the nine stars of the Big Dipper, was known in Malay as "Perayaan Dewa Sembilan Maharaja"
- Guan Teh Gong (關帝公) or Guan Sheng Di Jun (關聖帝君) or "Lord Guan" - God of Military, Symbol of Righteousness and Justice, Patron Deity of police, businessmen and secret societies
- Kuan Yim Pu Chor (觀音佛祖) or also known as Avalokiteśvara - Goddess of Mercy or Bodhisattva of Compassion
- Jiu Tian Xuan Nü (九天玄女) Lady of the Nine Heavens, an ancient Deity and also worshipped as Goddess of War
- Ma Zu (媽祖) or Tian Shang Sheng Mu (天上圣母), Goddess of the sea, Patron Deity of fishermen, sailors and any occupations related to sea/ocean, also regarded as Patron Deity for Lim (林) Clan
- Ong Yah Gong (王爺信仰), Divine Emissaries (代天巡狩) who tour the world of the living on behalf of the Jade Emperor, expelling disease and evil
- Qing Shui Zhu Shi (清水祖師) or Cho Su Gong (祖師公), Patron Deity of Anxi County in Quanzhou
- Bao Sheng Da Di (保生大帝), Patron Deity of Tong'an District in Xiamen, also worshipped as a Medicinal Deity
- Guang Ze Zun Wang (廣澤尊王), Honorific King of Great Compassion, Patron Deity of Nan'an City in Quanzhou
- Kai Zhang Sheng Wang (開漳聖王), Patron Deity of Zhangzhou
- Tua Pek Kong (大伯公) or Fu De Zheng Shen (福德正神)
- Hua Tuo (華佗), was regarded as "divine physician" in Chinese history and worshipped as a Medicinal Deity
- Qi Tian Da Sheng (齊天大聖) or Dai Seng Yah (大聖爺), the popular and powerful Monkey God
- Seng Ong Yah (城隍爺), Patron Deity of City or City God
- Choy Sun Yeh (财神 "Wealth God")
- Wen Chang Di Jun (文昌帝君), God of Culture and Literature, Patron Deity of scholars and students
- Zhu Sheng Niang Niang (註生娘娘), Goddess of fertility and children
- Yue Xia Lao Ren (月下老人), Patron Deity of marriage and love
- He-He Er Xian (和合二仙), Immortals of Harmony and Union, associated with happy marriages
- Hua Gong Hua Po (花公花婆) Patron Deities and Protector of children
- Tai Yang Xing Jun (太陽星君) Sun God
- Tai Yin Niang Niang (太陰娘娘) or Chang Er (嫦娥), Moon Goddess, worshipped by female devotees during Mid-Autumn Festival
- Tai Sui (太歲) 60 Heavenly Officials who will be in charge of each year during the Chinese sixty years cycle
- Fu, Lu, and Shou (福祿壽), Three deities of stars representing auspicious, good life and longevity.
- Wu Ying Jiang Jun (五營將軍 The Celestial Generals of Five Directions)
- Teh Choo Kong (地主公) "Earth Lord" or Di Zhu Shen (地主神) "God of the Purified Place"
- Ho Yah Gong (虎爺公) "Tiger Deity" who guard the temples and was worshipped for protection against bad luck, dangers and enemies
- Zao Jun (灶君), Kitchen God and also known as the Stove God
- Men Shen (門神), Divine Guardians of doors and gates
- Tua Li Yah Pek (大二爺伯), Underworld Deities who are in charge of escorting or arresting the spirits of the dead, also been highly regarded for their brotherhood spirit
- Gu Tao Baey Bin (牛頭馬面), Guardians of the Underworld
- Jin Qian Bo (金錢伯), Popularly known in English as Uncle Moneybags, who oversees incense money transmission from the living realm to the realm of the dead (Underworld)
- Si Mian Shen (四面神), also known as Four Faced Deity, who is also known as Brahma
- Na Tuk Kong (拿督公), also as Dato Gong or Datuk Gong, related to Datuk Keramat in Malaysian folk religion

=== Places of worship and practice ===
Chinese temples in Indonesia and Malaysia are called kelenteng, klenteng, tokong or pekong in local Malay languages, or alternatively bio, the southern Chinese pronunciation of Mandarin miao (庙). In Thailand their name is sanchao (Thai: ศาลเจ้า). Items for Chinese religious practices in Southeast Asia are supplied at shén liào shāngdiàn (神料商店 "shops of goods for the gods").

== See also ==
- Chinese folk religion
- Taiwanese folk beliefs
- Chinese spiritual world concepts
- Nine Emperor Gods Festival
- Birthday of the Monkey God
- Ancestor worship (Ancestral halls & Ancestral tablet)
- List of Mazu temples (Baishatun Mazu Pilgrimage & Tin Hau temples in Hong Kong)
- Kwan Tai temples in Hong Kong & Hip Tin temples in Hong Kong
- List of City God Temples in China
- Chinese temples in Kolkata
- Bell Church & Bell Church (temple)
- Chow Yam-nam (White Dragon King)
- Vietnamese folk religion
- Malaysian folk religion
- Burmese folk religion
- Tai folk religion
- Diwata
