= Na Tuk Kong =

Guardian spirits worshipped in overseas Chineses communities in maritime Southeast Asia

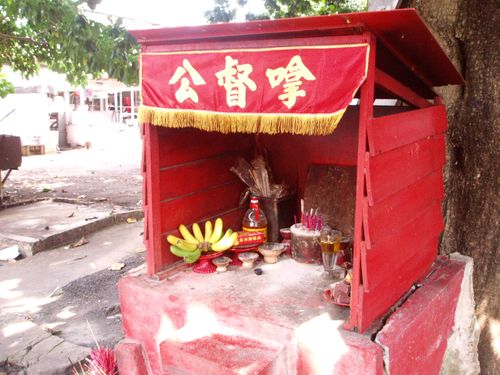
- Picture of Na Tuk Gong Shrine (拿督公神龕).
- Chinese: 拿督公
Transcriptions
Standard Mandarin
- Hanyu Pinyin: Nádūgōng
Yue: Cantonese
- Jyutping: naa4 duk1 gung1
Southern Min
- Hokkien POJ: Ná-tok-kong

Na Tuk Gong are local guardian spirits worshipped by overseas Chinese communities in Malaysia and Singapore. An alternate more generic name for the culture is Datuk Gong (or Kong), uniting Dato or Datuk from the local Malay word for 'grandfather', which is also used as an honorific title, and Kong or Gong from Chinese, also an honorific title.

In some Malaysian Taoist traditions, a Na Tuk Kong may bear the honorific title 拿督尊王 (pinyin: Nádū Zūnwáng, "Revered Datuk King"). Datuk Gong (also spelled Datuk Kong) and Na Tuk Kong (拿督公) are alternative names for local guardian spirits venerated in Malaysian Chinese folk religion. Their worship developed from the Malay Datuk Keramat tradition, although religious interpretations and practices vary among communities. The terms refer to a category of guardian spirits rather than a single deity.

== Origins ==
According to local legends, all Datuks were once humans who had a standing in society either for their position or special attributes. They could have been an important leader, a renowned healer, a silat warrior, a pious man or even a shaman. Upon their death, locals and their followers would sometimes offer prayers at their gravestones, in line with the concept of keramat. Local Malay culture prior to the arrival of a more conservative brand of Islam practised the paying of respects to guardian spirits or penunggu which is believed to reside in seemingly 'unusual' natural formations; a unique shaped rock, an anthill, a snake's nest, an extraordinarily large tree etc.

With the arrival of Chinese immigrants who carried along with them the Confucianist belief of ancestor worship, both practices converged and formed a new micro-culture as observed today. Datuks, referred to in Chinese as Na Tuk Kong (earth spirits), is considered a localised form in the worship of the spirit of the land, along with Tu Di Gong.

The worship of Datuks among Malays Muslim and Indian Muslims declined steadily after Islamic authorities started clamping down on such activities. By that time, Datuk worship have taken root in the local Chinese spiritual beliefs.

== Malaysian Chinese definition ==
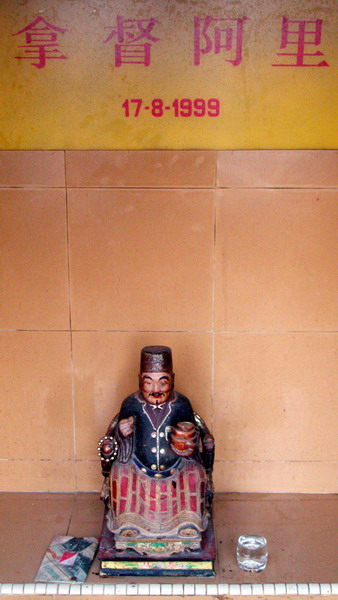
One of the Malay-Chinese Na Tuk Kongs in Malaysia, Datuk Ali (拿督阿里).

To most Malaysian Chinese, Datuk Gong is a local guardian spirit that resides in trees, ant hills, caves, riverbanks and in strange stone formations. A Datuk worship usually begins after a person is granted a vision of the Datuk's spiritual form. Some common forms are a white tiger and the form of an old man dressed in white. A Datuk can also be "invited" to reside outside (never indoors) a family home for spiritual protection and luck.

The Datuk Gong is presented in many forms; an idol bearing his likeness, a tablet with an inscription of his title, a rock, a songkok, a stack incense and flags are all used to denote the presence of the spirit. Shrines are usually decorated with items related to the Datuk and his position as a Malay guardian; a Malay sarong, songkok, keris, rattan cane, baju Melayu are among the items one can find placed right next to the idol. In more urban areas, the Datuk is usually represented with a central tablet bearing his title as the Datuk Gong of the area, written in Chinese.

A common misconception held by most Malaysians is that the Datuk Gong is just another regular Chinese deity. In fact, most Datuks are Malay-Muslim spirits. There are also Chinese, Indian, Siamese and even Orang Asli Datuks present and they are all considered independent from the Chinese pantheon of gods. The function and position of the Datuk varies across communities but his position as the spirit of the land remains the backbone of the belief. In most Chinese temples, the Datuk is almost always outside of the main building, either on a small altar of his own or a small shrine on the ground. Only in temples dedicated solely to the spirit will the idol or tablet be placed at the main altar.

== Variants ==
The structure of Datuk worship is diversified according to localities. For example, in the old quarters of Georgetown, the presence of The Seven Brothers or Tujuh Beradik is common while in the royal town of Klang in Selangor, most of the spirits worshipped are believed to be members of the royal court (Sultans, officers, warriors etc.), each with their own unique identity.

Some Datuks even have their own personal names, which are revealed to worshippers during a trance session conducted by a medium.

Around the Malaysian countryside some small, red-coloured painted shrines by the roadside or under a tree can be found, and these shrines are usually worshipped by the residents living around the neighbourhood. Older shrines are often seen incorporating Islamic elements such as the crescent moon and inscriptions in Jawi. Inside the simple room, a small, decorated statue depicting the Datuk is venerated. Offerings are presented on a small altar in front of the spirit. In some places it is possible to find large temples dedicated to the Datuk, all of which started out as much smaller shrines.

== Worship ==
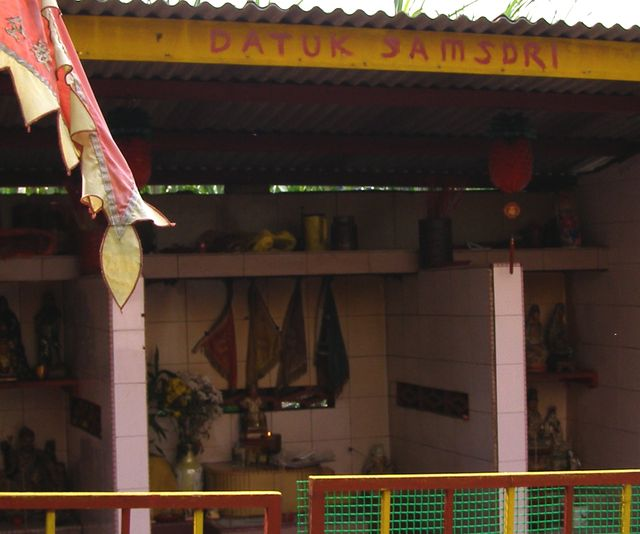
Photo of Malay-Chinese deity Datuk Samsuri, the shrine is at Cheras of Kuala Lumpur.

Offerings are usually placed at the altar or shrine once in the evening, at sunrise and later at sundown. The basic offerings are a pair of white candles, three joss sticks and burning gum Benjamin (kemenyan). Datuk worshippers prepare special offerings for the Na Tuk on Thursday evenings. A set of betel nut leaves complete with lime (kapur), sliced betel nut (pinang), Javanese tobacco (tembakau Jawa), and palm cigarette leaves (rokok daun), are offered together with fruits and the basic offerings.

Every Datuk is an individual and therefore his birthday is celebrated by worshippers with a grand feast. In the Northern States (Perlis, Kedah and Penang), worshippers usually slaughter chickens, and sometimes goats as the main dish of the kenduri. Pork is considered unclean and therefore is totally forbidden in a shrine. The meat is later cooked into a curry and offered to the Datuk together with turmeric rice(nasi kunyit), which is traditionally served at feasts in Malay culture. As the majority of worshippers are from the Chinese community, kenduris today also incorporate Chinese dishes and offerings usually presented to deities within the Taoist Pantheon of gods.

Worshippers usually offer fresh flowers, sirih (betel nut leaves), rokok daun (local hand-rolled cigarettes), sliced pinang (areca nuts) and local fruits. A part of the praying ritual is also to burn some kemenyan, the gum Benjamin. If their prayers are answered, the worshippers usually return to the shrine to make offerings or hold a kenduri (feast) in thanksgiving.

Another common practise is for individuals to renovate the shrines to create a better-looking or grander shrine for the Datuk. In most places where there is a heavy presence of Datuk spirits, it is common to see shrines becoming larger over time, especially if individuals consider the Datuk to be "powerful". The kenduri items usually consist of yellow (saffron) rice, lamb or chicken curries, vegetables, pisang rastali (bananas), young coconuts, rose syrup, cheroots (local cigars) and local fruits. Visitors are also asked to show respect when inside or around a shrine.

Datuks and keramats are seen as an alternative power to help in spiritual healing and granting protection. Mediums (bomohs) are engaged to enable communication between worshippers with the spirits. With the arrival of the spirits, the mediums go into trance and assume the personality of the spirit, giving instructions for further rituals and announcing the start of the consultation session. During this period, the locals would make a line to ask the spirit for blessings, cure for physical and "inexplicable" illness, predictions and sometimes guidance in overcoming certain obstacles in life. Such consultations are usually conducted on the first or 15th day of the month according to the lunar calendar.

== Significant datuks in history ==
=== Panglima Ah Chong ===
One Datuk was originally a man of Cantonese Hakka family, his name was So Ah Chong (蘇亞松). He was the leader of the Ghee Hin secret society that founded more than 16 tin mine settlements. The municipal government of Taiping in Perak named a road after him for his contribution to the economy. In June 1865 he was captured and sentenced to death by the local Malay chief of Matang during the Larut War among secret societies, yet the Malay chief honoured him by calling him "Panglima" Ah Chong (Commander Ah Chong). After his heroic death, it was said his spiritual powers was very effective for his worshippers and so peoples of Matang and coastal dwellers built shrines to worship him.

=== Dato Haji Keramat ===
The local Malay term Datuk Keramat means deity of the shrine, translated to Chinese is Na Tuk Kong, where "Kong" is a term of respect. Dato Haji Keramat is believed to be a very powerful local earth deity that helps many people who pray to him. He detests alcohol.

=== Datuk Zhang ===
In the Ming chronicle, during the reign of Emperor Wan Li 1573–1620 (萬曆皇帝), a man known as Zhang who lived in Brunei, originally from Zhangzhou in Fujian province, was appointed "Datuk" of Brunei. For certain reasons of injustice done to him, Datuk Zhang committed suicide, and so his countrymen wanted justice for him.

== See also ==
- Chinese ancestor veneration
- Chinese folk religion
- Chinese ritual mastery traditions
- Chinese spiritual world concepts
- Datuk Keramat
- Malaysian Chinese Religion
- Malaysian folk religion
- Shen (Chinese folk religion)
- Shigandang
- Taoism in Malaysia
- Tua Pek Kong
- Tudigong
