= Kusu Island Tua Pek Kong Temple =

Chinese temple on Kusu Island

Coordinates: 1.2233°N 103.8599°E

- 龟屿福山宫大伯公庙
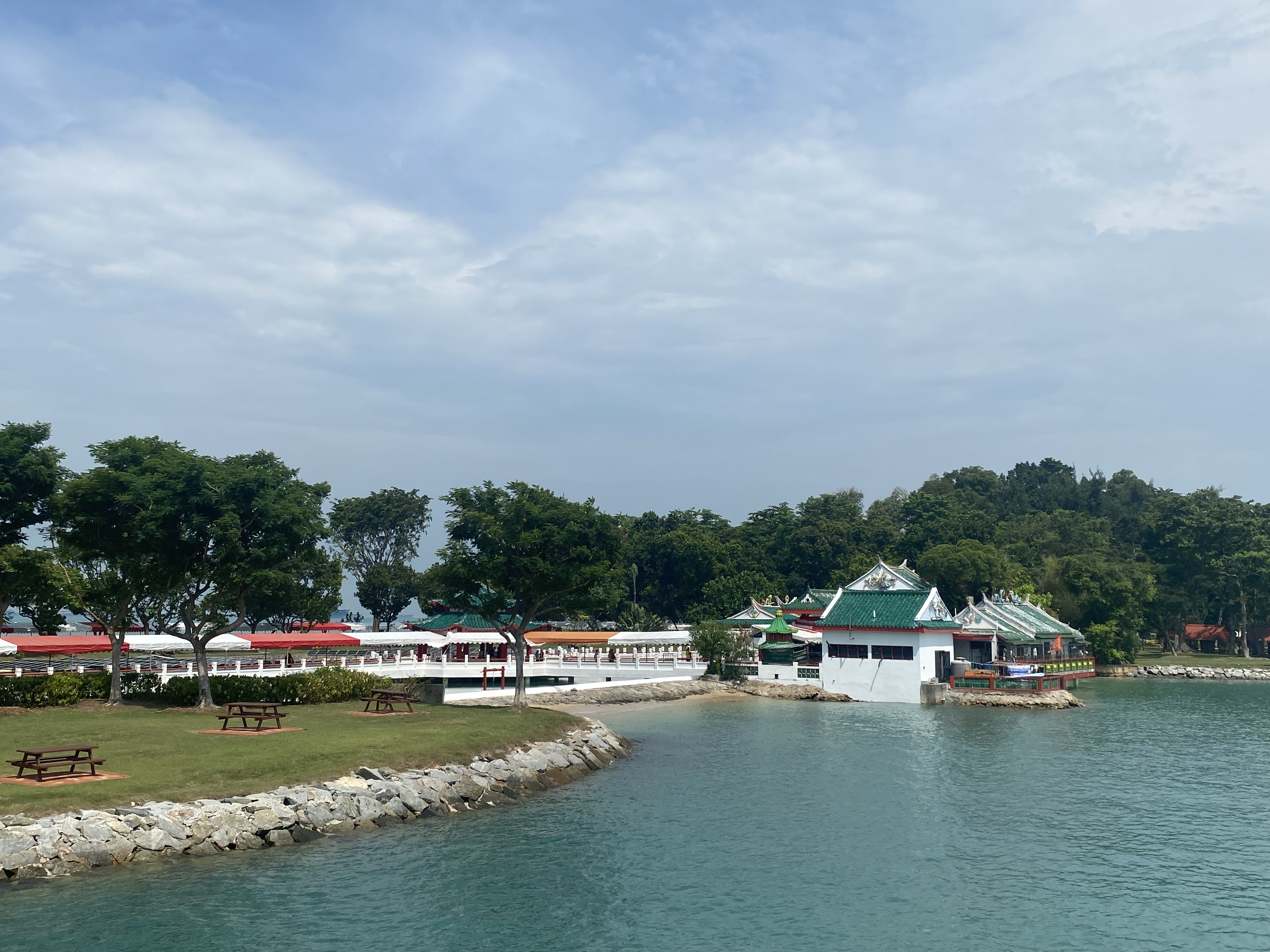

Religion
- Affiliation: Taoism, Buddhism
- Festival: Kusu Island Pilgrimage

Location
- Location: Kusu Island, Singapore
- Country: Singapore
- Interactive map of Kusu Island Tua Pek Kong Temple

Architecture
- Established: 1923

Tua Pek Kong Temple (Traditional Chinese 龜嶼福山宮大伯公廟; Simplified Chinese 龟屿福山宫大伯公庙) Chinese temple in Singapore, located on Kusu Island. It is dedicated to the worship of deity Tua Pek Kong.

== History ==
Tua Pek Kong Temple is located on Kusu Island, and got its name from Tua Pek Kong. In 2023, the temple celebrated its 100 years anniversary.

== Worship ==
Tua Pek Kong is the main deity alongside Guanyin worshipped at the temple. The signboard at the entrance of the temple states that Tua Pek Kong, seen as the God of Prosperity, Merchant God and a patron deity of seafarers, has the powers to confer prosperity, cure diseases, calm the sea and avert danger whereas Guanyin is known as "Giver of Sons".

Other deities being worshipped in the temple include Eight Immortals, Guan Yu and the Tiger god (虎爷). The temple also houses a fertility tree (求子树), where well wishes are hung upon it.

The temple also houses turtle statues and a turtle pond.

== Pilgrimage ==
Every year during the Chinese Lunar 9th month, thousands of devotees from Singapore and neighbouring countries like Malaysia, Indonesia and Thailand will make their pilgrimage to Kusu Island. The 9th lunar month is thought to be sacred due to its linkages to the origination myth of Kusu Island. During the pilgrimage, offerings such as fruits, joss papers and Chinese prosperity cakes (發糕) are brought by pilgrims to give thanks to the deities and pray for blessings. Pilgrims would also replace fulu talismans and fraying amulets from the previous year with new ones.

As part of the annual pilgrimage, devotees also climb 152 steps to pay respects at the Keramat Kusu on top of a hill. The three shrines are dedicated to Syed Abdul Rahman, Nenek Ghalib and Puteri Faimah.

== Gallery ==
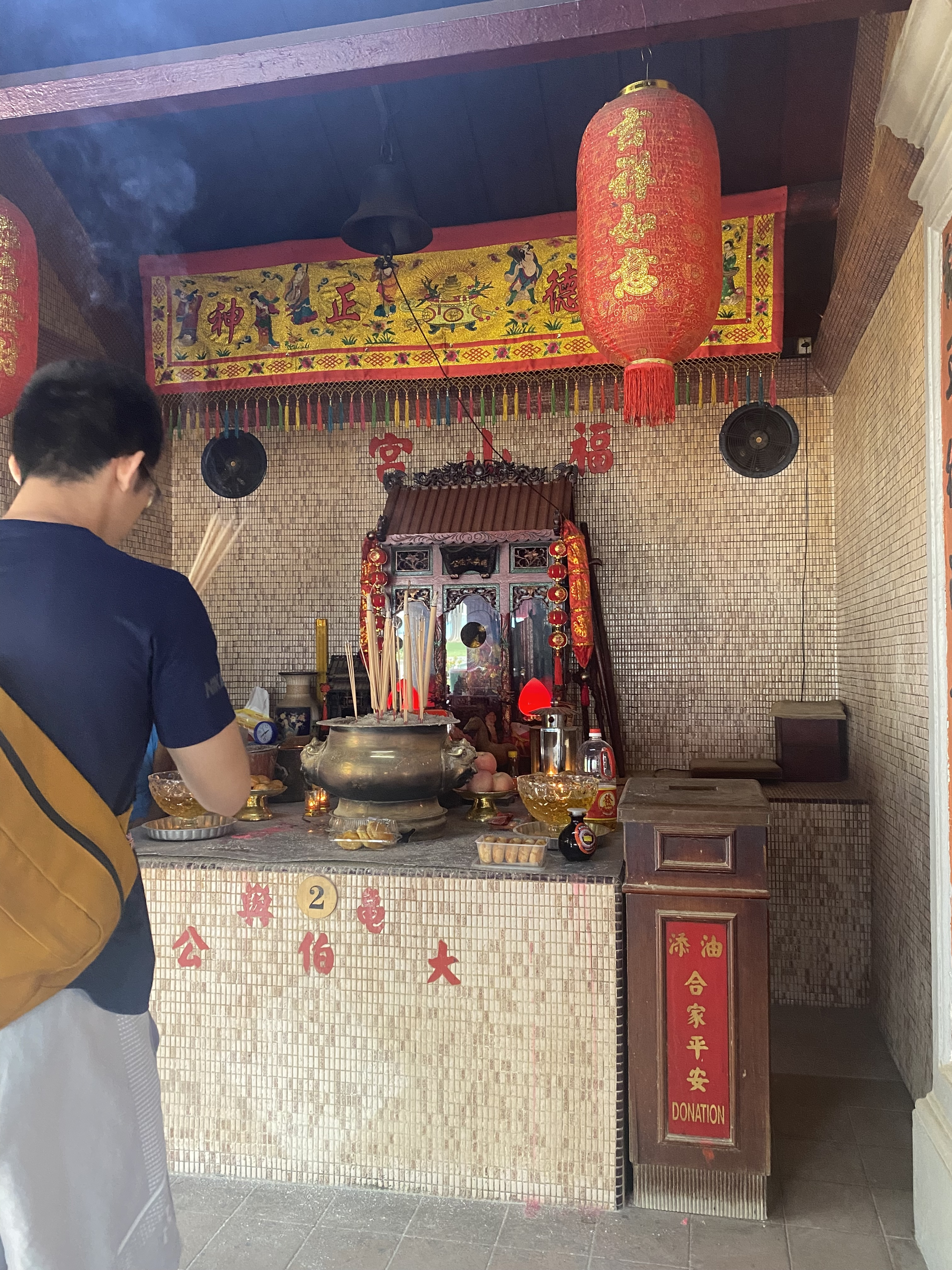
Pilgrim praying to Tua Pek Kong on Kusu Island

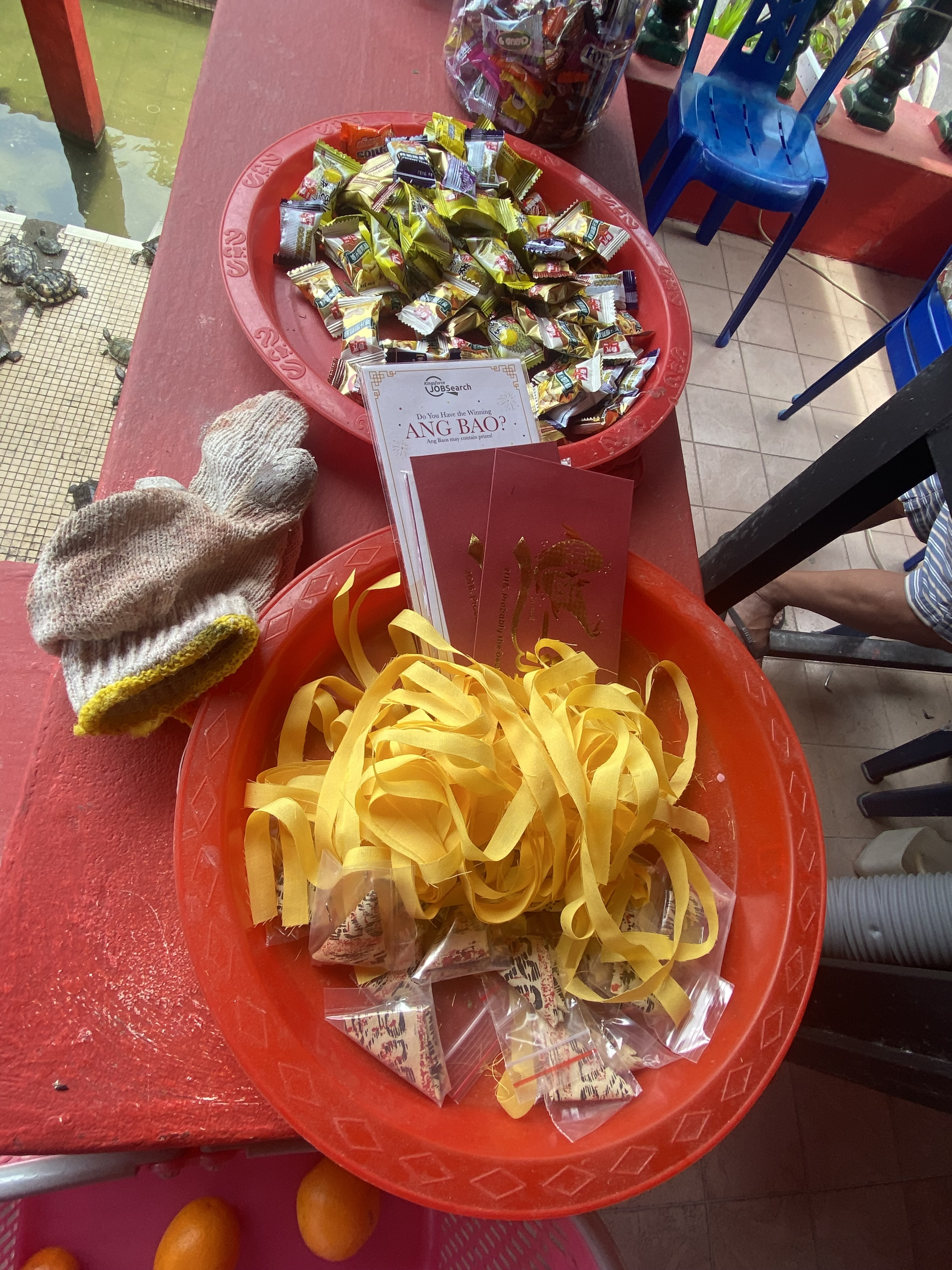
Talismans and fraying amulets from the Tua Pek Kong Temple

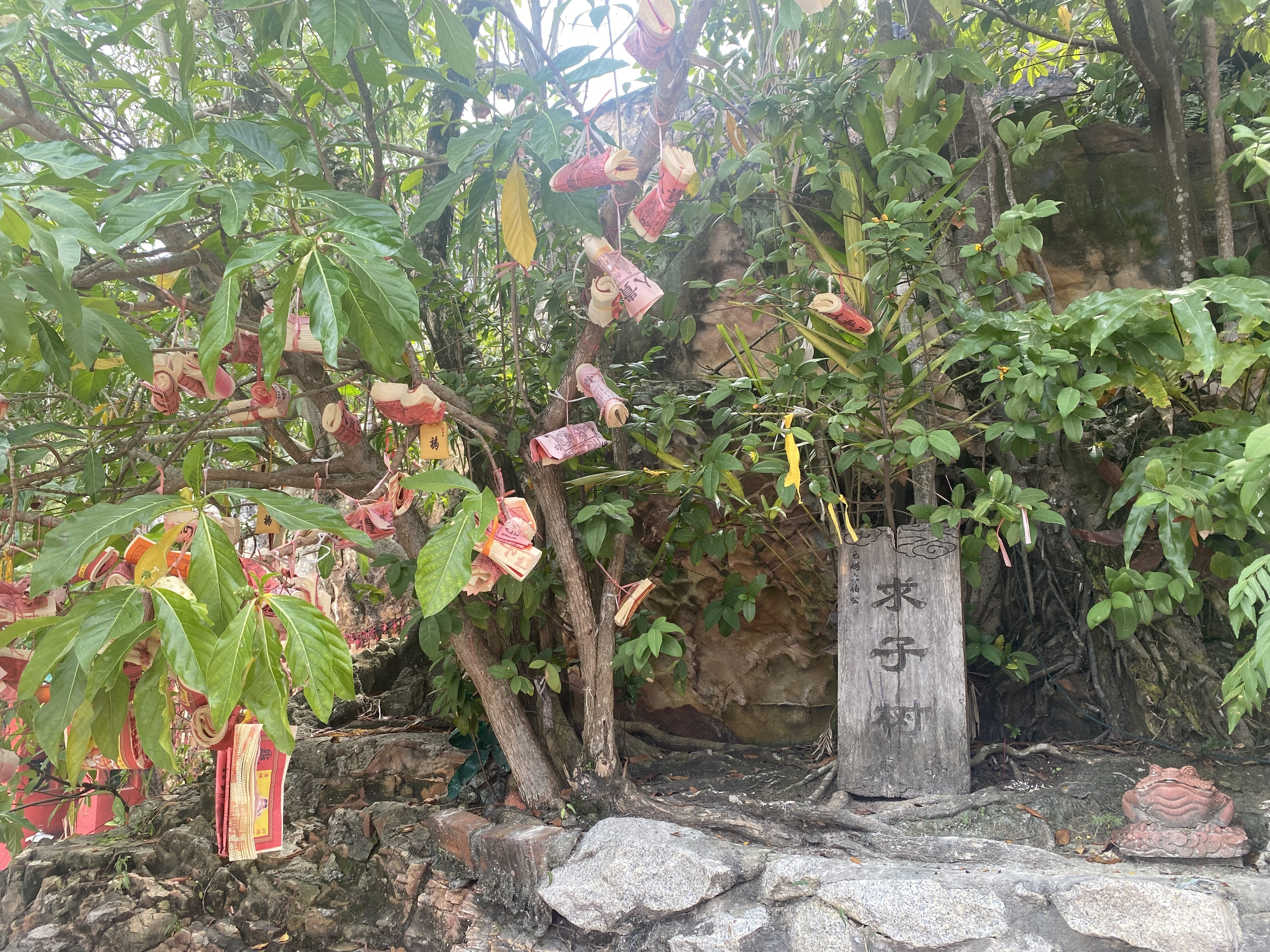
Fertility tree at Kusu Island
