= Kusu Island =

Southern Island in Singapore

Native name: Pulau Tembakul 龟屿 குசு தீவு
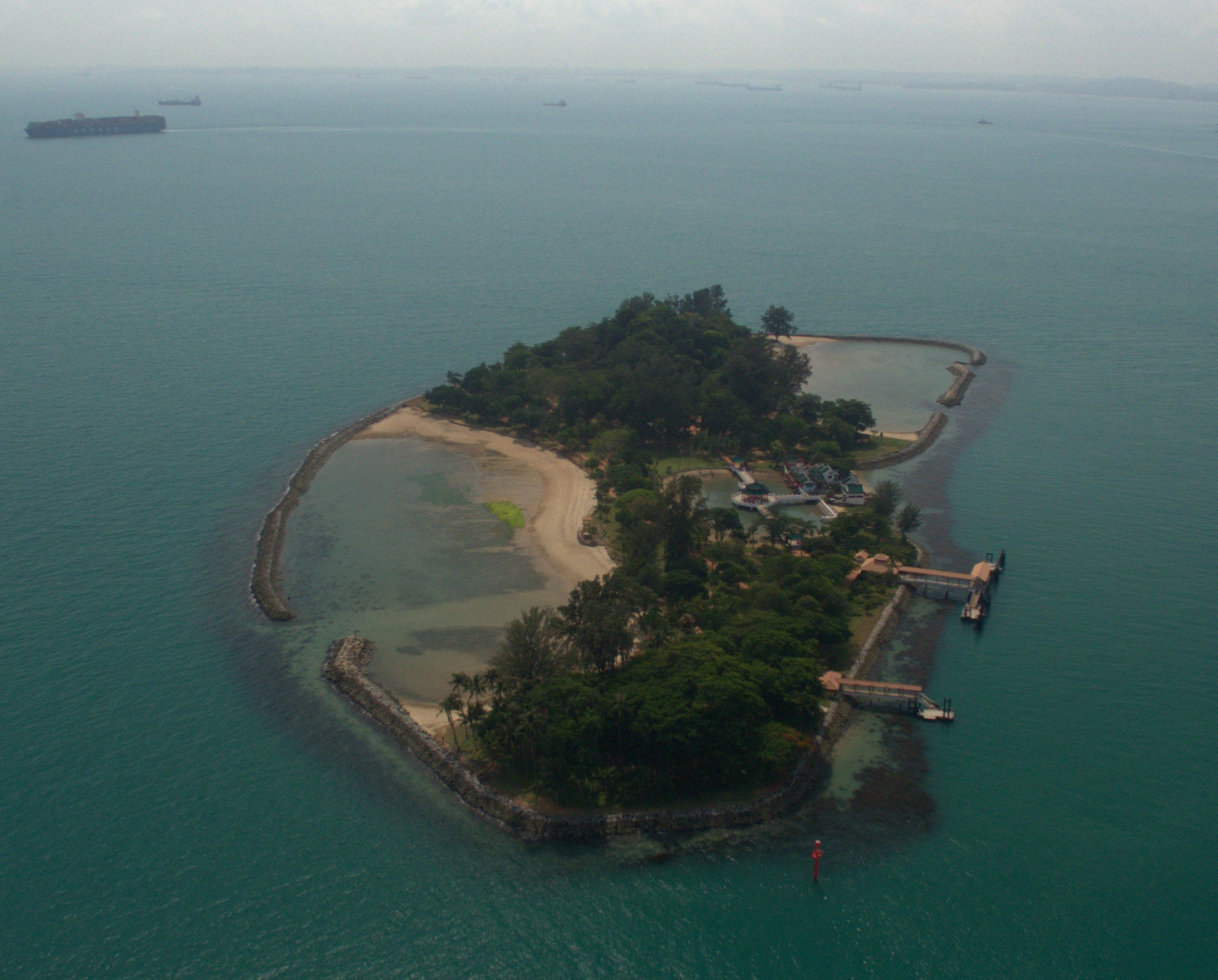
- Aerial perspective of Kusu Island, Singapore. Shot in 2016.

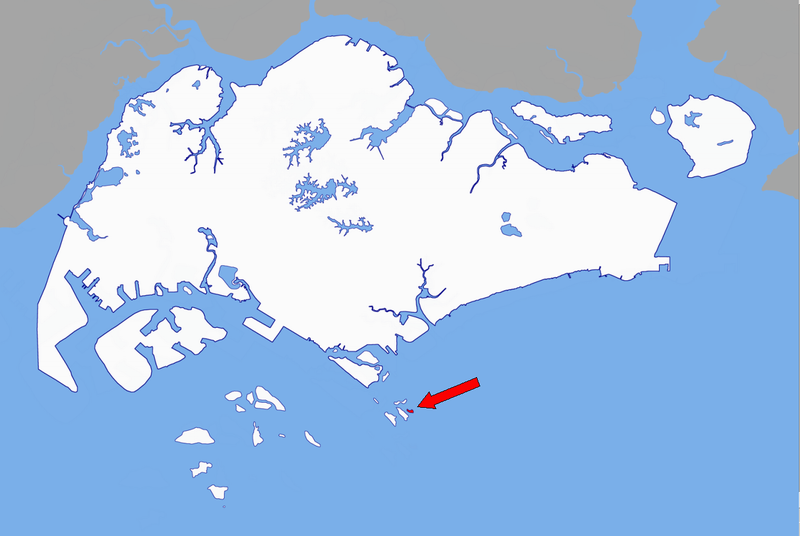
- Location of Kusu Island within Singapore

- Location within Singapore
- Etymology: Tortoise island

Geography
- Location: Southeast Asia
- Coordinates: 1°13′22″N 103°51′40″E
- Archipelago: Malay Archipelago
- Area: 0.085 km^{2} (0.033 sq mi)

Administration
- Singapore
- Region: Central Region
- Planning Area: Southern Islands

Demographics
- Population: 0 (people not allowed to live there)

Additional information
- Official website: Official website
- Transport Marina South Pier

Kusu Island is one of the Southern Islands in Singapore, located about 5.6 kilometres (3.5 miles) to the south of the main island of Singapore and below the Singapore Straits. Kusu means 'Tortoise Island' or 'Turtle Island' in Hokkien (Chinese: 龟屿; Pe̍h-ōe-jī: Ku-sū); the island is also known as Peak Island or Pulau Tembakul in Malay.

During the lunar ninth month of every year, the Kusu Island pilgrimage attracts thousands of devotees who visit and worship at the Kusu Island Tua Pek Kong Temple. Besides the Chinese temple, the island is also home to Keramat Kusu.

From two outcrops on a reef, the island was enlarged and transformed into an island of 85,000 square metres (914,932 sq ft).

== Mythology ==
There are many legends surrounding the island and they mainly revolve around a giant tortoise as well as the friendship between two men, one Malay and the other Chinese.

1. Two holy men by the name of Syed Rahman, an Arab, and Yam, a Chinese, who meditated and fasted on their pilgrimage to Kusu Island. During the journey, Yam fell ill, and Syed prayed for his recovery. Their lives were saved when a boat appeared with food and water. Thereafter, the 2 holy men regularly visited Kusu Island to give thanks. The Tua Pek Kong temple and Datuk Keramat were subsequently erected and dedicated to their memory.
2. During one lunar 9th month centuries ago, shipwrecked sailors were rescued by a giant turtle which turned itself into an island. The sailors returned the next year to make offerings. Since then, Kusu Island has become a place of worship.
3. Two shipwrecked fishermen, a Chinese and a Malay were saved by a giant turtle that transformed into an island.

== History ==
Some sources argue that the earliest mention of Kusu Island was in March 1616 when Spanish Governor of the Philippines, Dom Jose De Silva, ran his fleet aground at Kusu Reef. In the 17th century, the island was known as Governor's Island. In 1806, the island was renamed Goa Island by Scottish hydrographer James Horsburgh, possibly as an abbrieviation of Governor's Island. With the arrival of Stamford Raffles in 1819, the island was selected as a reference point for ships entering the new port, and a signal station was built on the island in 1822. The island became a burial site for immigrants who died while quarantined in the nearby Saint John's and Lazarus islands.

The original residents of the island, the Orang Laut, were relocated by the government to the Singapore mainland in the 1970s and subsequently boatmen who ferry devotees to the island. After their departure, there are no permanent residents on the island. In 1975, Kusu Island was expanded through land reclamation from two small outcrops totalling 2.5 ha into a recreational island of 8.5 ha.

In 2021, during the pilgrimage season in October, the Singapore Land Authority (SLA) restricted the island to 500 visitors per day by limiting the number of passengers to 50 per ferry trip due to the COVID-19 pandemic in Singapore. There were only 10 hourly ferry trips per day.

On 17 April 2022, the keramats were badly damaged in a fire. Most of the resconstruction work was completed before the 2022 pilgrimage season, allowing devotees to make their pilgrimage. Retiling was done, at a cost of over $200,000, and a second set of stairs with guards rails was opened. The keramat was without a roof and covered with temporary tentage, due to high costs of rebuilding. It was also missing walls and a storeroom to store prayer materials.

In 2025, the bumboat jetty was temporarily closed for structural checks and repair works by the SLA. The main jetty is still operational.

== Facilities ==
At the top of the hillock on Kusu Island stood a large shrine, the Keramat Kusu that consisted of three shrines. While the origin of the Keramat was unknown, there are two variations of the origin. The first version was that it was the shrine for a Malay sailor or fisherman and the second version was that it housed the shrines of Sayyid 'Abd al-Rahman, an Arab immigrant, his mother Nenek Ghalib and his daughter Puteri Sharifah Fatimah.

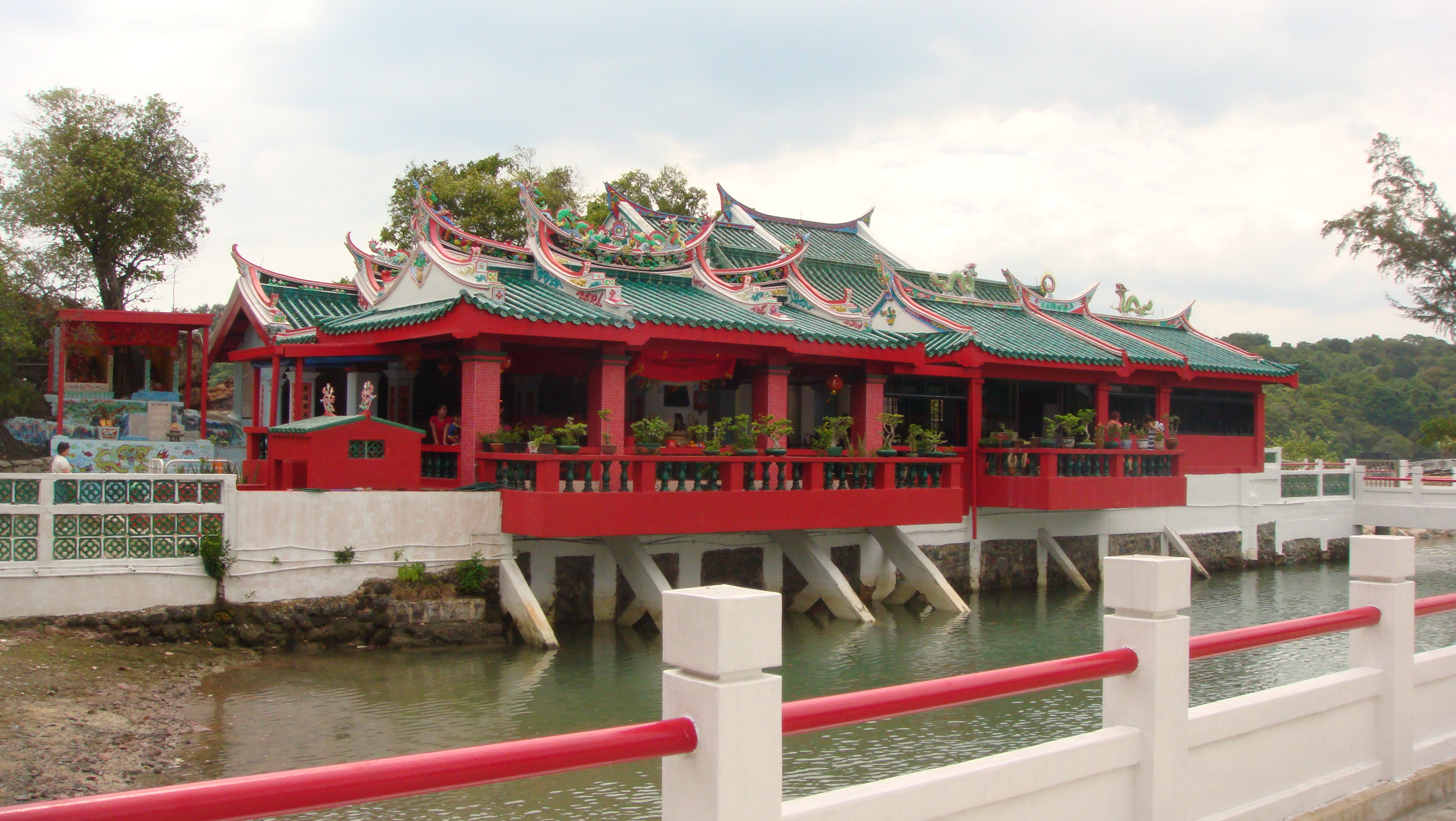
Kusu Island Tua Pek Kong Temple

Also located on Kusu island is the Kusu Island Tua Pek Kong Temple dedicated to both Tua Pek Kong and Guanyin. Built in 1923 by a wealthy businessman, the temple also includes the Eight Immortals, Guan Yu and the Hu Ye (Tiger Deity). The temple also houses a fertility tree (求子树), where written wishes are hung upon it.

A stand-alone open-air hawker centre is located in the middle of the island but it is only open during festivals or pilgrimages to the keramat or the temple. The hawker centre has 18 stalls.

Permits are needed to stay overnight on the island.

== Pilgrimage ==
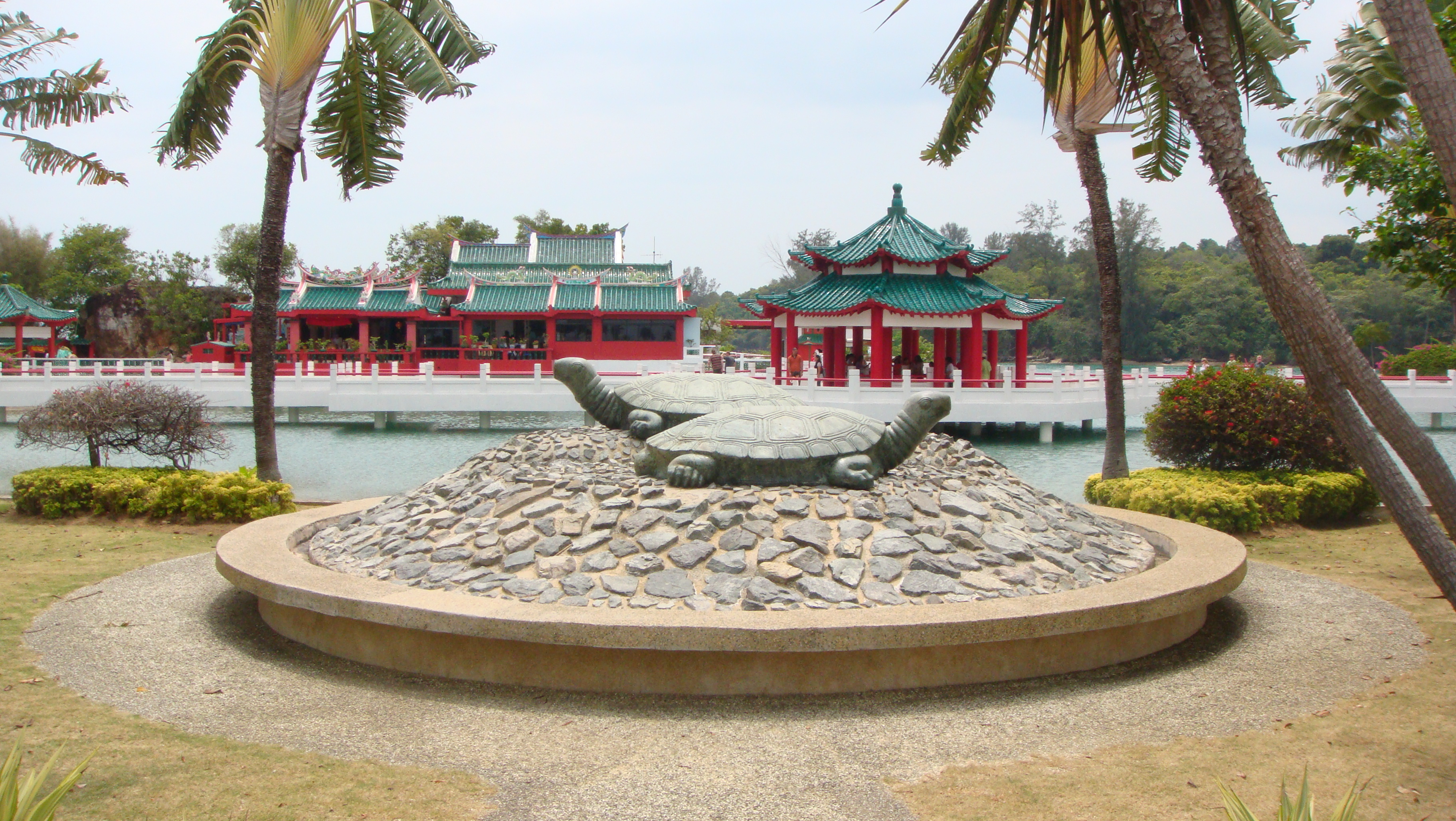
Marble Tortoise statues on Kusu Island.

Every year during the Chinese Lunar 9th month, thousands of devotees from Singapore and neighbouring countries like Malaysia, Indonesia and Thailand will make their pilgrimage to Kusu Island. The 9th lunar month is thought to be sacred due to its linkages to the origination myth of Kusu Island. During the pilgrimage, offerings such as fruits, joss papers and Chinese prosperity cakes (發糕) are brought by pilgrims to give thanks to the deities and pray for blessings. Pilgrims would also replace fulu talismans and fraying amulets from the previous year with new ones.

As part of the annual pilgrimage, devotees also climb 152 steps to pay respects at the Datuk Keramat. Devotees pray for wealth, good marriage, good health and harmony at the shrines. They are also popular with childless couples who would pray for children.

== Transportation ==
Ferry trips are available via Marina South Pier. The island has a main jetty and a bumboat jetty.

== Biodiversity ==
Kusu Island has been recognised for its substantial quantity and diversity of fringing reefs, though these reef ecosystems have also been degraded though land reclamation and modified through the construction of coastal defences. The Singapore Blue Plan 2018, a ground-up initiative published by the Singapore Institute of Biology, proposes Kusu Island alongside Saint John's and Lazarus islands for elevated protection because it is an established site for coral nurseries and a shoreline offering sheltered areas for new coral growth. The endangered basket star Euryale aspera, which was presumed locally extinct, was identified by the 2015 Comprehensive Marine Biodiversity Survey at the southeast of Kusu Island. The locally-endangered sea urchin Chaetodiadema granulatum was identified at a 5m depth at Kusu Island in 2025.
