= Keramat Kusu =

Religious shrine in Kusu Island

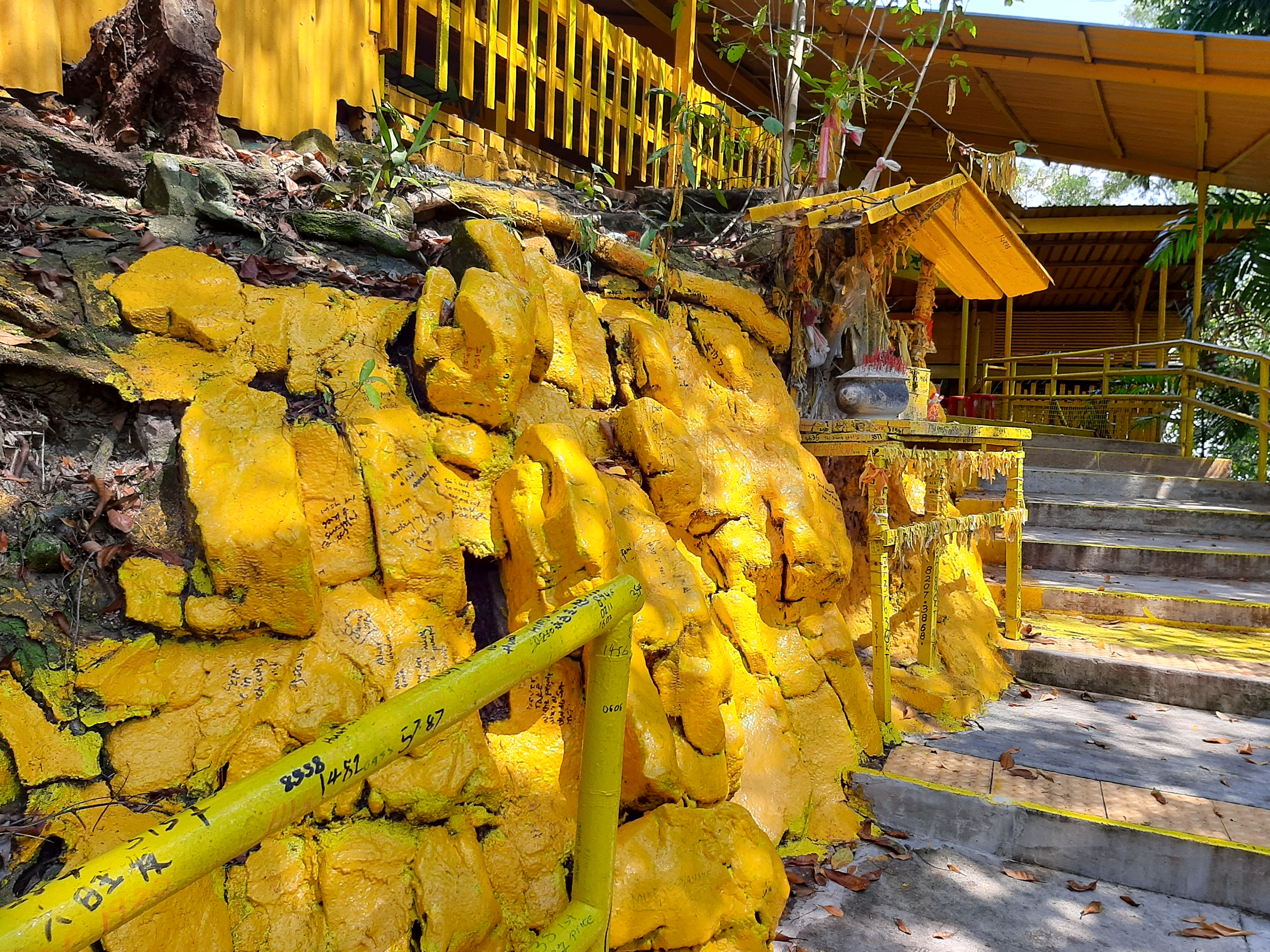
- Main entrance of the shrine

- Location within Singapore

General information
- Type: shrine, mausoleum
- Location: Singapore
- Coordinates: 1.2230471°N 103.8616528°E
- Year built: c. 1880s
- Destroyed: 2022: Under reconstruction
- Owner: Ishak Samsudin (current caretaker)

The Keramat Kusu is a Datuk Keramat shrine located on Kusu Island. It is a religious complex containing three enshrined Muslim tombs. The shrine is visited every year as part of a pilgrimage to Kusu Island. In 2022, the shrine was damaged by a large fire and is currently undergoing restoration.

== History ==
The exact date of construction of the shrine is not known, but some early reports state it was built in 1889. The entombed, Sayyid 'Abd al-Rahman, known locally as "Datok Kong" is said to have lived in the 19th centuries CE. A letter dated to 9 March 1875 mentions the shrine's existence under the name "Datok Kramat" and also mentions the annual pilgrimages held to the site. The shrine received renovation in 1917 and was expanded in 1921. However, the shrine seemingly did not have any association with any saint at first, as a 1932 newspaper article describes the shrine in detail but only attributes the grave to be that of a "Malay fisherman." The shrine only became known with the name of Syed Abdul Rahman reportedly in 1948.

Keramat Kusu was almost completely destroyed by a large fire on 17 April 2022. The cause of the fire has not been determined. Restoration works are undergoing, as of 2022.

== Mythology ==
The traditional legend behind the entombed of Keramat Kusu has two variations.

The first version, it is said that the entombed was a Malay sailor or fisherman. In the second version, it is said that the entombed is Sayyid 'Abd al-Rahman, an Arab immigrant, and buried with him were his mother Nenek Ghalib and his daughter Puteri Sharifah Fatimah.

The second version of the legend is the most commonly followed; the current shrine has graves for all three of the aforementioned. The inscriptions at the keramats described that in 1917 Nenek Ghalib appeared in the dreams of a Straits Chinese man, Hoe Beng Whatt, and requested for the keremat to be built. In return, he would be rewarded with success as well as donors who contributed to the construction of the keramat.

At least one source claims that the graves in the shrine are merely symbolic cenotaphs that do not hold any human remains.

== Significance ==
The shrine is popular amongst childless couples, who pray there to have children.

== See also ==
- Datuk Keramat
- Malaysian folk religion
