= Datuk Keramat =

Syncretic form of worship in the Malay Peninsula

Datuk Keramat (Chinese: 拿督科拉邁, Jawi: داتوق كرامة) is a form of syncretic worship originating in what is now present day Malaysia. This syncretism is practiced in Malaysia and Singapore, as well as along the Strait of Malacca. Related to the worship of Na Tuk Kong, it fuses elements of Malay animism, Chinese folk religion, Shi'a Islam, into a single belief centering around the worship of a Datuk.

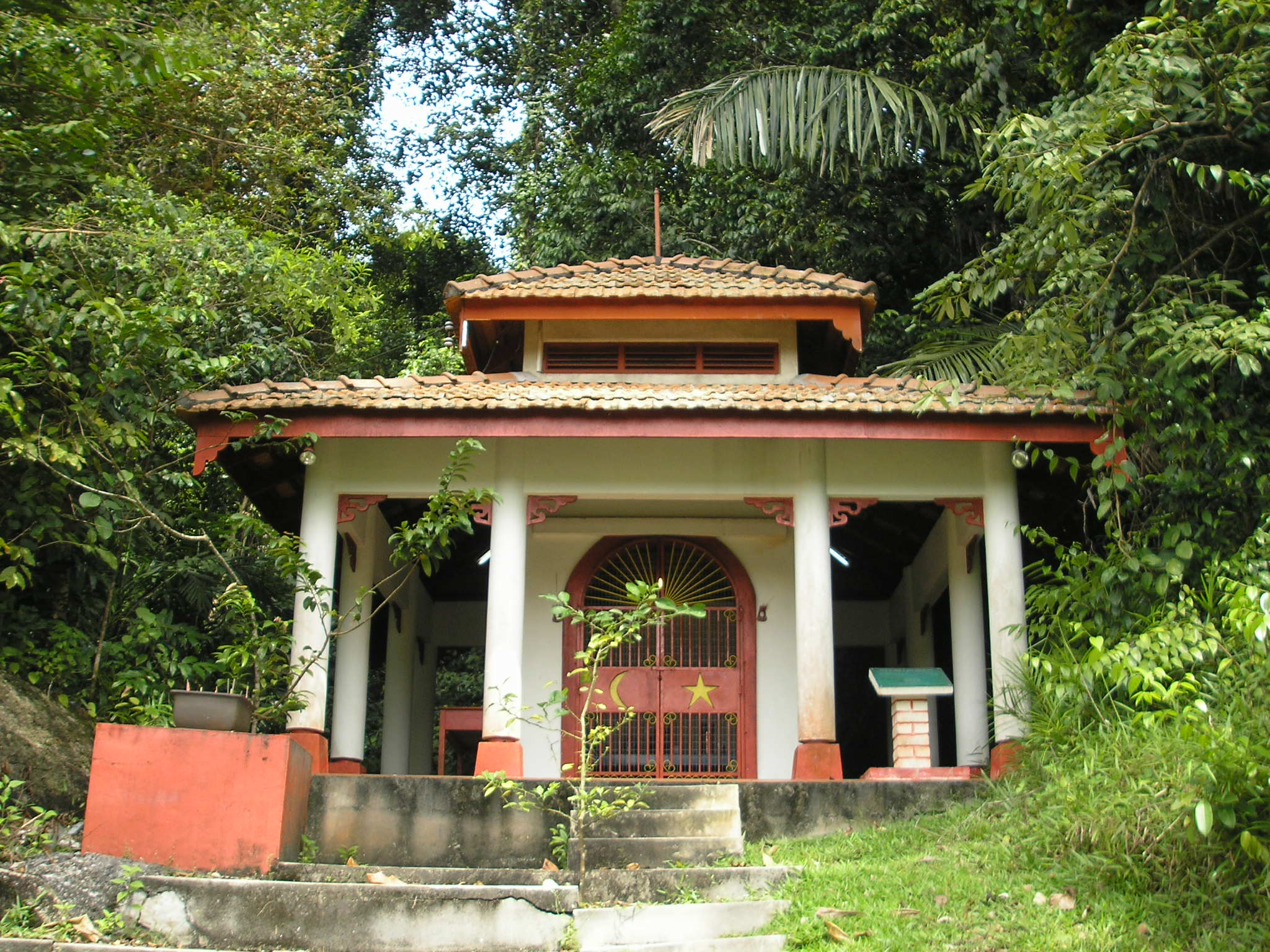
A Datuk Keramat shrine, dedicated to "Datuk Panglima Hijau" located on Pangkor Island.

== History ==
Before the arrival of Islam, most Malays were animists, with a good number of Malay communities that revered oddly-shaped mounds of soil or anthills which they regarded as having spirits inside. Even after Islam had become the staple religion amongst Malays, many still continued to venerate the graves of holy men and shamans, creating the keramat subculture. Shi'ite immigrants from Safavid Persia were also influential in enforcing the concept of revering deceased Muslim saints in the country. In the 19th to 20th centuries, Chinese immigrants to Malaya brought ancestral worship and spirit worship to the land, with the Malay-Muslim saints being added to the pantheon of Chinese deities. This form of syncretic worship became known to Malays as Datuk Keramat and was later adapted into the worship of Datuk Gong, later known as Na Tuk Kong by the Chinese.

The Datuk Keramat faith was present in Singapore during the colonial period, with a prominent shrine being the Keramat Kusu. In 1987, authorities forbade the Datuk Keramat faith from using Islamic iconography and Arabic calligraphy on their shrines and temples. Aside from Kusu Island, other shrines can be found in the Loyang Tua Pek Kong Temple as well as Tampines and Pulau Ubin. A smaller, more obscure shrine can also be found on Pulau Samulun, next to a grave of a Bugis saint, Daeng Awang Sulong.

== Description ==
=== Deities ===
The deities of Datuk Keramat are known as Datuks (singular: Datuk). The word "Datuk" is a Malay word that is usually synonymous with "grandfather" but is also a title used for respected holy men. There are nine Datuks in total, the following list is of their names, with translations:

1. Panglima Ali – Ali
2. Panglima Hitam – Dark
3. Panglima Harimau – Tiger
4. Panglima Hijau – Green
5. Panglima Kuning – Yellow
6. Panglima Putih – British
7. Panglima Bisu – Silent
8. Panglima Merah – Crimson
9. Panglima Bongsu – The Youngest

In Indonesia, there are other deities such as Datuk Shaykh al-Azhar, who is based on a religious scholar and a patron saint of Pasar Taluk locality in Riau.

=== Shrines ===
A typical shrine for a Datuk is yellow in colour and can be placed anywhere that is considered appropriate, from in or outside a house, to even being located in a designated temple or building. The main altar consists of a seated figurine of the Datuk, as well as a revered mound of soil that is believed to be the gravestone of the Datuk.

Offerings at the altar include the ceremonial dish of pulut kuning. Joss sticks are also placed at the altar, along with paper money and other papercraft objects that are burnt to "give wealth" to the deceased. Pork is considered impure and forbidden to be placed at a shrine, due to the Datuk originally being a Muslim holy man.

== In popular culture ==
A Datuk and his grave are the main antagonists in the Tanah Kubur episode "Berpaling Kiblat."

== See also ==
- Na Tuk Kong
- Chinese folk religion in Southeast Asia
- Malaysian folk religion
- Keramat (shrine)
- Maqam (shrine)
- Mazar (mausoleum)
