= Jinqianbo =

Jinqianbo (simplified Chinese: 金钱伯; traditional Chinese: 金錢伯; pinyin: Jīnqián Bó; lit. 'Money Uncle') is a god of wealth in Chinese folk religion. He is worshipped in Chinese temples in Malaysia and Singapore. People believe that he looks after the money and other offerings burned for the dead. They also pray to him for money and help with financial problems. He is sometimes called the God of Wealth of the Underworld (陰間財神爺).

== Etymology ==
The name Jinqian (金錢) means "money", while bo (伯) means "uncle" or an older man. The name is used as a respectful title for the deity.

== Legend ==
One legend says that Jinqianbo was once a man named Li Shaoxing (李韶興), who was born in 1650 during the Qing dynasty. His father was a merchant, and his family followed Buddhism. Li studied from a young age and often helped poor people. He later passed the imperial examination and became the Prefect of Shaozhou (韶州), where he used his position to help the poor.

After twelve years in office, Li left his post at the age of 32. He opened a place for study and spent his time learning about Buddhism and Taoism. At the age of 36, he entered a Daoist temple and became a monk. He died there at the age of 42. After his death, the Jade Emperor gave him a jade ruyi and made him Baoyu Cailu Siguan (寶玉財祿司官), an official in charge of wealth.

The Fifth King of Hell then gave Jinqianbo the duty of looking after money and other offerings burned by the living for their dead relatives. He counts the offerings and keeps them safe. If a soul has finished its punishment in the underworld, Jinqianbo gives it the offerings sent by its family. If the punishment is not yet over, he keeps the offerings until the soul can receive them.

Another story tells of a kind man who gave away his money to help the poor. He was not wealthy and eventually had nothing left to buy food. He refused to borrow money and died of hunger. After his death, the Fifth King of Hell rewarded him for his good deeds and made him Jinqianbo. He was then given the duty of managing money sent to the dead.

Both stories say that Jinqianbo uses the money in his care to help the living relatives of the dead. People believe that he may help them pay their debts or find money when they are in trouble. Some also believe that he gives lucky lottery numbers through dreams. In these stories, he is said to favour people who respect their parents and ancestors and help others.

== Worship and appearance ==
Jinqianbo is often shown wearing golden robes. Some statues show him smiling and holding gold ingots in his left hand and a jade ruyi in his right. The gold ingots stand for wealth, while the ruyi stands for good fortune.

Other images show him with different objects. At Jinqian Hall (金錢殿) in Penang, Malaysia, he has been described as wearing a golden hat and robe and holding a golden smoking pipe and a fan. Worshippers visit him to ask for help with money problems.

Jinqianbo is also worshipped at the Lorong Koo Chye Sheng Hong Temple in Singapore. The temple lists him among the deities outside its main hall and calls him the "Deity of Prosperity".

In Malaysia, he is among the gods worshipped at Ling Sheng Tan (靈聖壇) in Cheras, Kuala Lumpur. Shi Yun Gong (石雲宮) in Johor Bahru also has a deity called Jinqianbo in its front hall. In August 2024, the temple brought its deities on a visit to Yitian Temple (義天宮) in New Taipei City, Taiwan.

In September 2026, a Taiwanese news report showed a shrine in Singapore where Jinqianbo was worshipped with other underworld gods. Visitors placed lottery numbers before his altar in the hope of receiving good luck.
