= Chow Yam-nam =

Thai Taoist and living saint (1937–2013)

- Chinese: 周欽南; Thai: กิมน้ำ จิรรัตนพิเชษฐ์
- Born: 19 June 1937; Pattaya, Chonburi, Thailand
- Died: 17 August 2013 (aged 76)
- Other names: White Dragon King (白龍王)
- Children: 4
- Website: whitedragonking.com

Chow Yam-nam (Chinese: 周欽南; Thai: กิมน้ำ จิรรัตนพิเชษฐ์; 19 June 1937 – 17 August 2013), known by the honorific title White Dragon King (Chinese: 白龍王; pinyin: Bái Lóngwáng) for his claim to be an incarnation of the Taoist deity of the same name, was a Thai spiritual guru. His reputed clairvoyance attracted a following, particularly among entertainment and business circles in Hong Kong and Taiwan.

== Early life ==
Chow was born to Chinese parents in Pattaya, Chonburi, Thailand, on 19 June 1937. His ancestors came from Chaozhou, Guangdong, China. Prior to his religious work, he reportedly repaired electronics, fixed bikes, and was a hawker.

== Spiritualism ==
The most widely circulated origin story about Chow holds that, at the age of 13, he witnessed the manifestation of a “White Dragon King,” said to be a disciple of Taishang Laojun with a white dragon as his mount. References to such a deity are scarce, if not non-existent, in Taoist literature, which may explain why the figure in the story is also sometimes interpreted as the White Emperor. Other stories point to a nearly fatal car accident when Chow was in his 20s or a dream when he was in his 40s as what set him on his spiritual path. Regardless of its origins, Chow reportedly received the Dragon King's enlightenmenment in the 1980s. He subsequently took on the name of White Dragon King to himself and was thereafter regarded as a living saint.

Chow taught himself palmistry, fung shui, and soothsaying and built up a following. In the 1990s, he received donations from two Hong Kong businessmen, allowing him to build the Bak Lung-wong Temple in his hometown of Pattaya in Thailand. The temple, where he would spend the rest of his life, opened in 2007. Hundreds of people, all wearing white in a show of respect, began queueing outside the temple beginning at 4am in the hopes of witnessing Chow's prayers. After burning 17 sticks of incense, visitors were permitted entry. One-on-one meetings were rare and short, oftentimes only 5 minutes, but his disciples could join him in group prayer in 15-minute sessions.

In addition to offering spiritual guidance, Chow’s reputed clairvoyance attracted a celebrity following in Hong Kong and Taiwan. Among those who met with him were Jackie Chan, Richie Ren, Andy Lau, Leon Lai, Carina Lau, Sammi Cheng, Miriam Yeung, Show Lo. Among his devotees are Peter Lam. Tony Leung, Eric Tsang, Wong Jing, and Shu Qi.

Upon request, Chow blessed the 2002 film Infernal Affairs and advised the crew to change the name from The Departed to something using only three Chinese characters (Infernal Affairs in Chinese is 无间道). Prior to the start of production for Infernal Affairs II, he recommended moving filming up to August rather than early September. In 2003, singer and actor Leslie Cheung requested an audience with Chow but was rejected, as it was "not the right time." Following Cheung's suicide, Chow expressed his sadness as well as his belief that Cheung was possessed by ghosts and was unable to fight them off. In 2008, Edison Chen and Gillian Chung separately approached Chow for guidance following the anonymous release of sexual photos.

In 2010, Chow was admitted to a Bangkok hospital with influenza-related pneumonia. He died from bronchitis on 17 August 2013. He and his wife had 4 daughters. Chow's daughter Pet, who was raised in the US, succeeded him and took on the name Yellow Dragon King.
