= Malaysian folk religion =

Animistic and polytheistic beliefs and practices

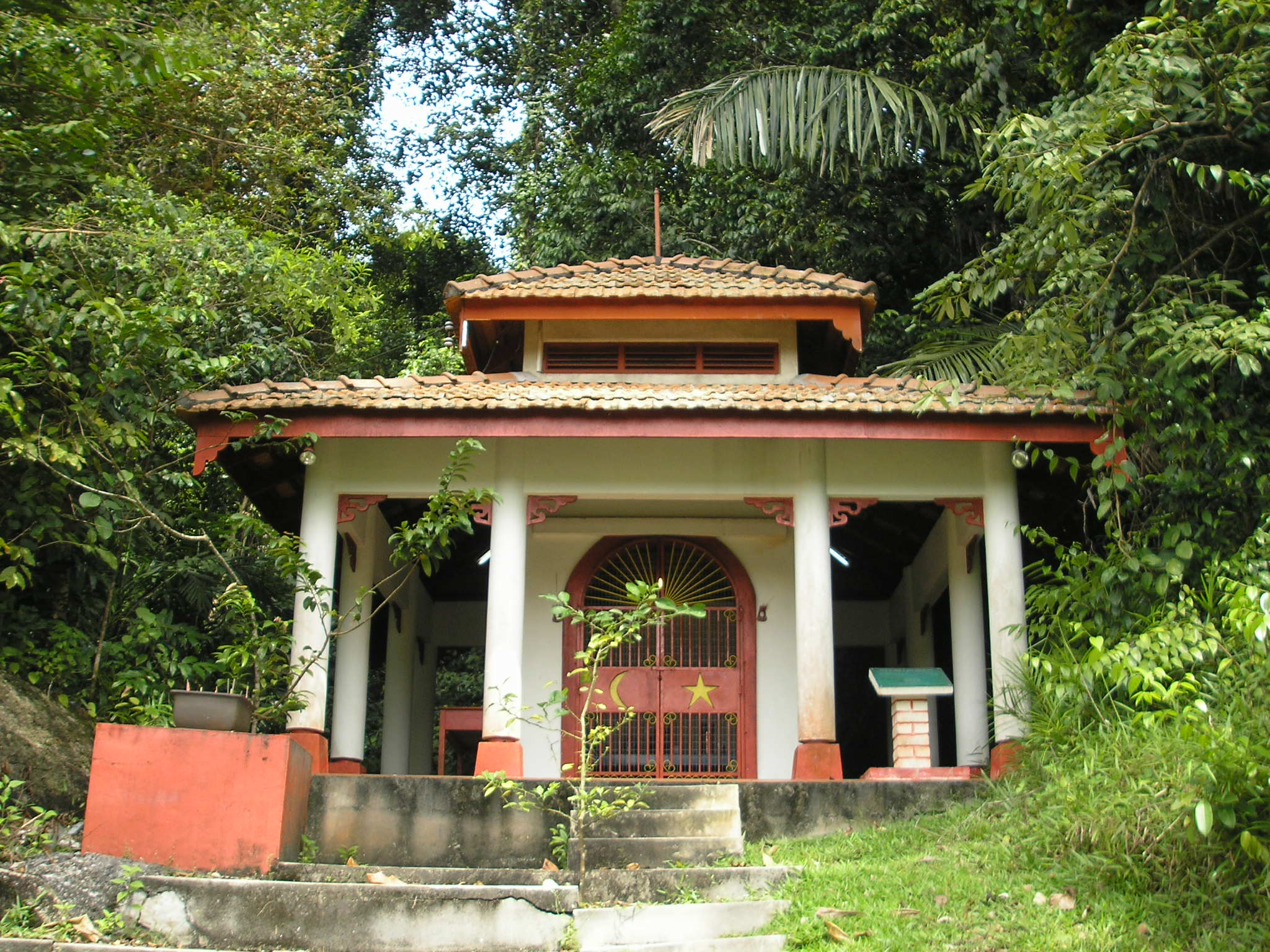
Shrine of Panglima Hijau, a Datuk or (in Malaysian Chinese) Na Tuk Kong, a god of the place on Pangkor Island

Malaysian folk religion refers to the animistic and polytheistic beliefs and practices that are still held by many in the Islamic-majority country of Malaysia. Folk religion in Malaysia is practised either openly or covertly depending on the type of rituals performed.

Some forms of belief are not recognised by the government as a religion for statistical purposes although such practices are not outlawed. There is a deep interaction between the Chinese folk religion of the large Malaysian Chinese population, and the indigenous Malaysian folk religion.

== Overview ==
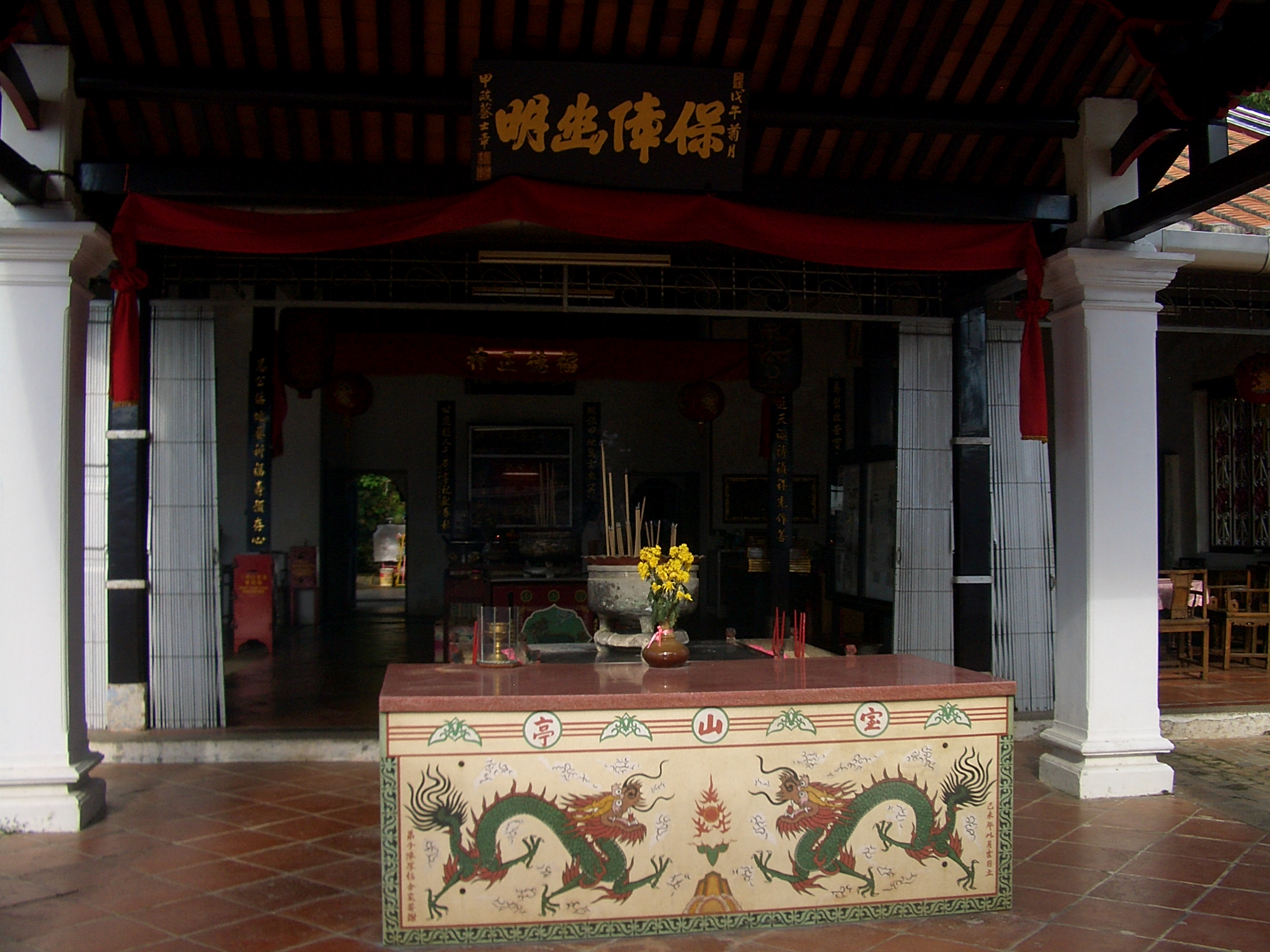
Poh San Teng Temple is the oldest temple dedicated to the Chinese ancestral figure of Tua Pek Kong, related to Tudigong or Earth Deity; it was built in 1795.

There are different types of Malaysian folk religions practised throughout the country. Shamanic performances are held by people known as bomohs, also known as pawang or dukun. Most Orang Asli (indigenous people) are animists and believe in spirits residing in certain objects. However, some have recently converted to mainstream religions due to state-sponsored Muslim dawah or evangelism by Christian missionaries.

In East Malaysia, animism is also practised by an ever decreasing number of various Borneo tribal groups. The Chinese generally practise their folk religion which is also partially animistic in nature. The word "bomoh" has been used throughout the country to describe any person with knowledge or power to perform certain spiritual rituals including traditional healing—and as a substitute for the word "shaman". Generally speaking, Malaysians have deep superstitious beliefs, especially in rural areas.

== History ==
Historically, before the arrival and spread of Islam in the 15th century, and the spread of Christianity in the 19th century, the inhabitants of the land were either Hindu-Buddhists or practised indigenous faiths. In the peninsula, the rise of islam is said to have begun in 1409 after Parameswara became Sultan of Malacca and converted to Islam after marrying a princess from the Samudera Pasai Sultanate. Since then, other Sultanates in the Malay peninsula have adopted Islam. Also since then, and continuing after the independence of Malaysia, Islam played a central role in Malaysian society.

Similarly in East Malaysia, folk religion was widespread prior to the arrival of Christian missionaries from Europe. The practice of headhunting was quite common in these societies.

In Sabah there are still followers of the indigenous religion Momolianism: the Kadazan-Dusuns worshipped Kinoingan, a rice deity, and celebrate Kaamatan, the harvest festival, every year. During Kaamatan, there are certain rituals which have to be carried out by the high priestesses known as bobohizans (or bobolian in the Bundu-Liwan dialect of Dusun). Today, most Kadazan-Dusuns have adopted Christianity, but some still celebrate Kaamatan. However, the number of bobohizans has tremendously dropped and this role is on the brink of extinction.

In Sarawak, it has been said that the animism practised by the Ibans and other related groups is the most developed, elaborated, and intellectualised in the world. Folk religious practice in East Malaysia is related to the religion of Kaharingan in Kalimantan, Indonesia, which has been recognised as an official religion by the Indonesian government. However, the rituals involved are not entirely similar with variations depending on the ethnic subgroups which practise them.

== Shamanism and traditional healing ==
The shamans bomohs or witch doctors still practise their craft in Malaysia. The bomoh practice by Malays has been integrated into Islam and is not forbidden. They are also known as traditional healers and sometimes serve as an alternative to conventional modern medicine. However, the practice has sometimes been viewed negatively by Malaysian society as in some instances bomohs have the power to cast spells (jampi) and have used them on other people with ill effects. The number practitioners of bomohs has also dropped.

The bobohizans of Sabah are also shamans and are traditional healers. They also act as a medium to communicate with spirits and play an important role in the rituals involved during Kaamatan, a harvest festival celebration of the Kadazan-Dusun.

Recently there has been suggestions for the need and importance to preserve the practice of bomohs and other shamans as traditional healers and to complement or substitute conventional modern medicine.

== Malaysian Chinese Gods ==
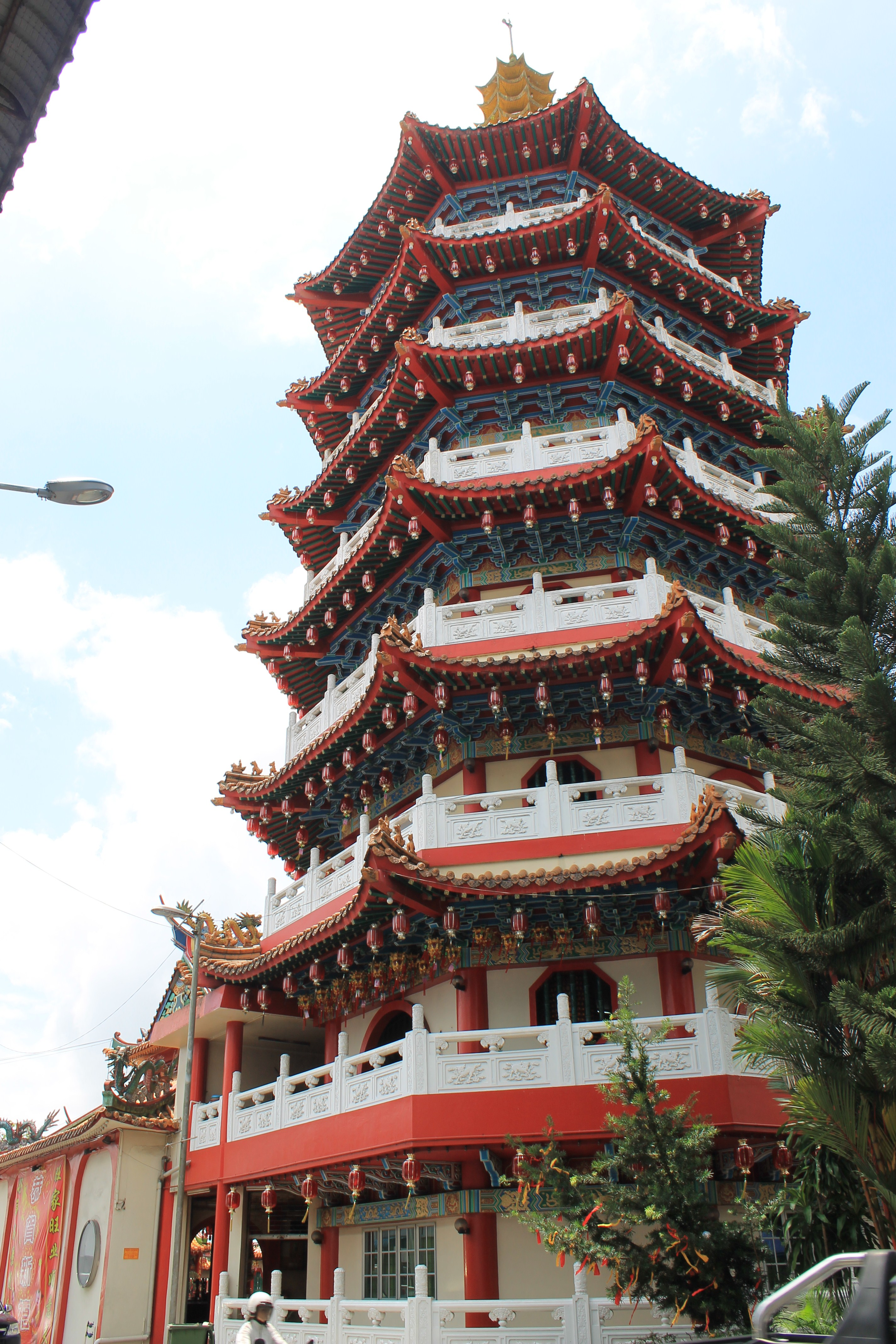
A pagoda of Tua Pek Kong Temple, Sibu

Tua Pek Kong (Chinese: 大伯公; pinyin: Dàbó Gōng, Hakka: Thai phak koong, Hokkien: Tuā-peh-kong, Malay: Topekong. lit. "grand uncle") is one of the pantheon of Malaysian Chinese deities. He is believed to have arrived in Penang 40 years before Francis Light in 1746.

Tua Pek Kong is claimed to have been a Hakka named Zhang Li (Chinese: 張理). His Sumatra-bound boat was struck by wind and accidentally landed on Penang off Malaysia, which at that time had only 50 inhabitants. After his death, the local people began worshipping him and built the Tua Pek Kong temple there. Today, Tua Pek Kong is worshipped by Malaysian Chinese throughout the country. However, Pek Kong is also an honorific title for Tu Di Gong or the Earth Deity within Chinese community.

Na Tuk Kong are local guardian spirits worshipped in Malaysia, Singapore and parts of Indonesia, especially Sumatra. Na Tuk Kong (earth spirits) in Chinese religionist's perspective, is considered a localised form in the worship of the spirit of the land, along with Tu Di Gong. It is also important to note that Datuk Keramat, Datuk Gong and Na Tuk Kong all refer to the same deity. For the sake of clarity, the term Datuk, which is universally used to describe the spirit in Malaysia, will be used.

== Chinese folk religion ==
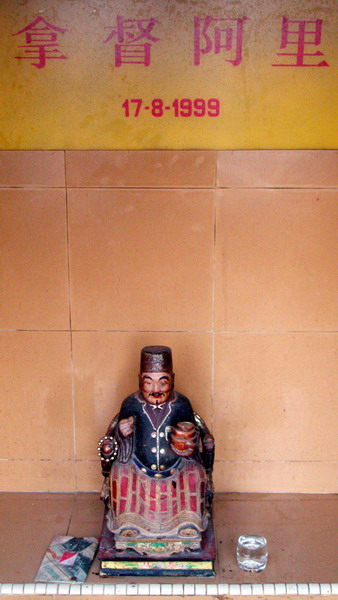
One of the Natuk Kong in Malaysia, "Datuk Ali" (Chinese: 拿督阿里)

Today, most of the Chinese population in Malaysia adheres to Mahayana Buddhism, while the rest are Theravada Buddhists, Confucians, Taoists and a small number of Christians, Muslims and Hindus. Most Chinese Malaysians still adhere to Chinese folk religion (which includes ancestral worship) in tandem with mainstream religious practices.

A small minority of them may have stopped practising the folk traditions after converting to certain monotheistic religions which aggressively prohibit any form of religious syncretism or folk religion. As is the case in China, the practice of Chinese folk religion is not documented by the government for statistical purposes. Thus the number of followers in Malaysia can only be estimated.

== See also ==
- Burung Petala Processions – Parades commemorating the circumcision ceremony of nobility in Kelantan, Malaysia
- Candi of Indonesia – Hindu and Buddhist temples and sanctuaries in Indonesia
- Datuk Keramat – Syncretic form of worship in the Malay Peninsula
- Kaharingan – Indonesian folk religion
- Kejawèn – Folk religion of Javanese people
- Kuda Kepang – Indonesian traditional dance
- Kusu Island – Southern Island in Singapore
- Mak Yong – Malay Theatre
- Momolianism – Belief systems of Sabahan native peoples
- Satsana Phi – Native ethnic religion of the Tai people
- Tajul muluk – System of geomancy in south-east Asia
- Ulek Mayang – Traditional dance in Malaysia

Regional:

- Burmese folk religion
- Chinese folk religion
- Chinese folk religion in Southeast Asia
- Indonesian folk religion
- Philippine folk religions
- Vietnamese folk religion
