= Kenduri =

Traditional Javanese and Malay communal feast

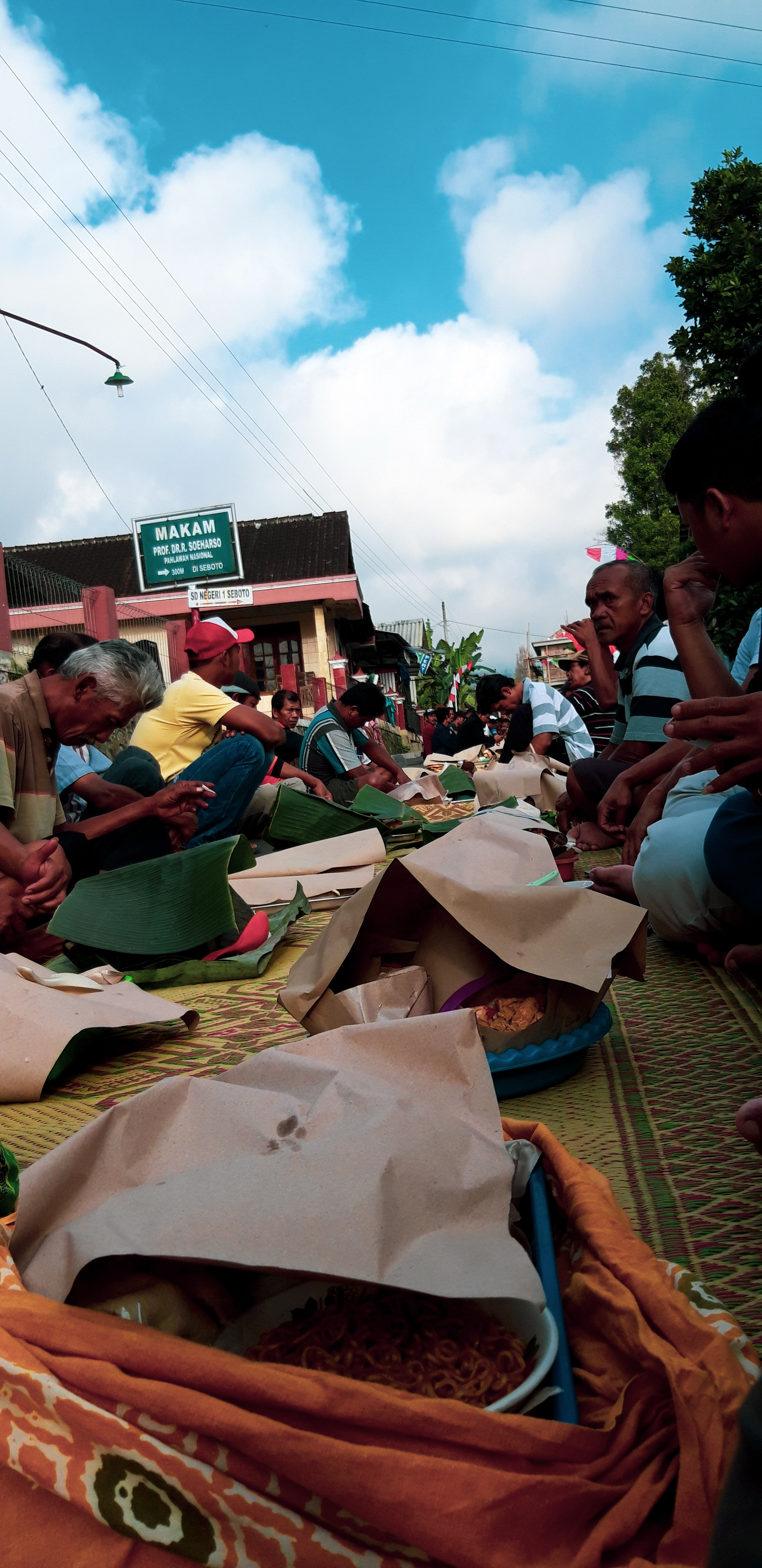
A kenduri gathering held during a village anniversary celebration in Indonesia.

Kenduri (also known as selametan or kenduren in Javanese) is a traditional communal banquet and prayer ritual practiced primarily by the Javanese in Indonesia, as well as by Malay communities in Malaysia and Brunei. The ritual serves as a expression of gratitude, a means to request blessings, or a ceremony to commemorate major life events and religious occasions.

== Practices and social role ==
A kenduri typically gathers members of a neighborhood or village. The event is usually led by a community elder or a local religious leader who recites prayers—often combining Islamic supplications with localized cultural traditions. In traditional settings, the formal prayer and dining assembly consists predominantly of men, while women play a central role in organizing, preparing, and distributing the food, which serves as a vital opportunity for social networking and community bonding.

Participants are often served traditional foods such as tumpeng (a ceremonial cone-shaped rice dish) or heavy rice meals. At the conclusion of the event, guests are frequently given food parcels known as berkat or bawaan to take home to their families.

== Regional variations ==
=== Indonesia ===
In Javanese culture, the event is commonly referred to as selametan (derived from the word selamat, meaning peaceful or safe). It is performed for various life-cycle events, including births, marriages, housewarmings, and memorial services for deceased relatives (such as on the 7th, 40th, or 1000th day after death).

=== Malaysia and Brunei ===
In Malaysia and Brunei, kenduri refers broadly to festive banquets held for major life milestones such as weddings, circumcisions, aqiqah (celebration of a newborn), and thanksgiving prayers (kenduri kesyukuran).

== See also ==
- Selametan
- Tumpeng
- Javanese culture
