= De teaching =

Church of Virtue 德教會 Déjiàohuì
- Classification: Taoist-inspired folk religious sect
- Origin: 1945; Chaozhou, Guangdong
- Other name(s): Moral Uplifting Society
- Official website: http://www.dedjaonism.org

The De teaching (Chinese: 德教 Dejiao, "teaching of virtue", the concept of De), whose corporate name is the Church of Virtue (德教會 Déjiàohuì), is a sect rooted in Taoism, that was founded in 1945 in Chaozhou, Guangdong. It is popular both in China and amongst expatriate Chinese populations.

== History ==
Originally a reaction of Chaozhou shamans to the Japanese occupation of Chaozhou, it blossomed in the wave of religious innovation after the Second World War. After the communist takeover in Mainland China in 1949 the De faith spread to Overseas Chinese communities in Thailand, Singapore and Malaysia. In recent decades, it has spread back to China and started a worldwide expansion effort.

== Bibliography ==
- Bernard Formoso. De Jiao - A Religious Movement in Contemporary China and Overseas: Purple Qi from the East. National University of Singapore, 2010. ISBN 978-9971-69-492-0
- Bernard Formoso. A Wishful Thinking Claim to Global Expansion? The Case of De Jiao (德教) . Asia Research Institute Working Paper No. 96, Université Paris X Nanterre, Sept. 2007, 27 pp.
- Kazuo Yoshihara. Dejiao: A Chinese Religion in Southeast Asia. Japanese Journal of Religious Studies, Vol. 15, No. 2/3, Folk Religion and Religious Organizations in Asia (Jun. - Sep., 1988), pp. 199–221. Published by: Nanzan University
- Chee Beng Tan. The Development and Distribution of Dejiao Associations in Malaysia and Singapore, A Study on a Religious Organization. Institute of Southeast Asian Studies, Occasional Paper n. 79. Singapore: Institute of Southeast Asian Studies, 1985. ISBN 978-9971-988-14-2
