= Hu Ye =

Tiger deity in Chinese folk religion

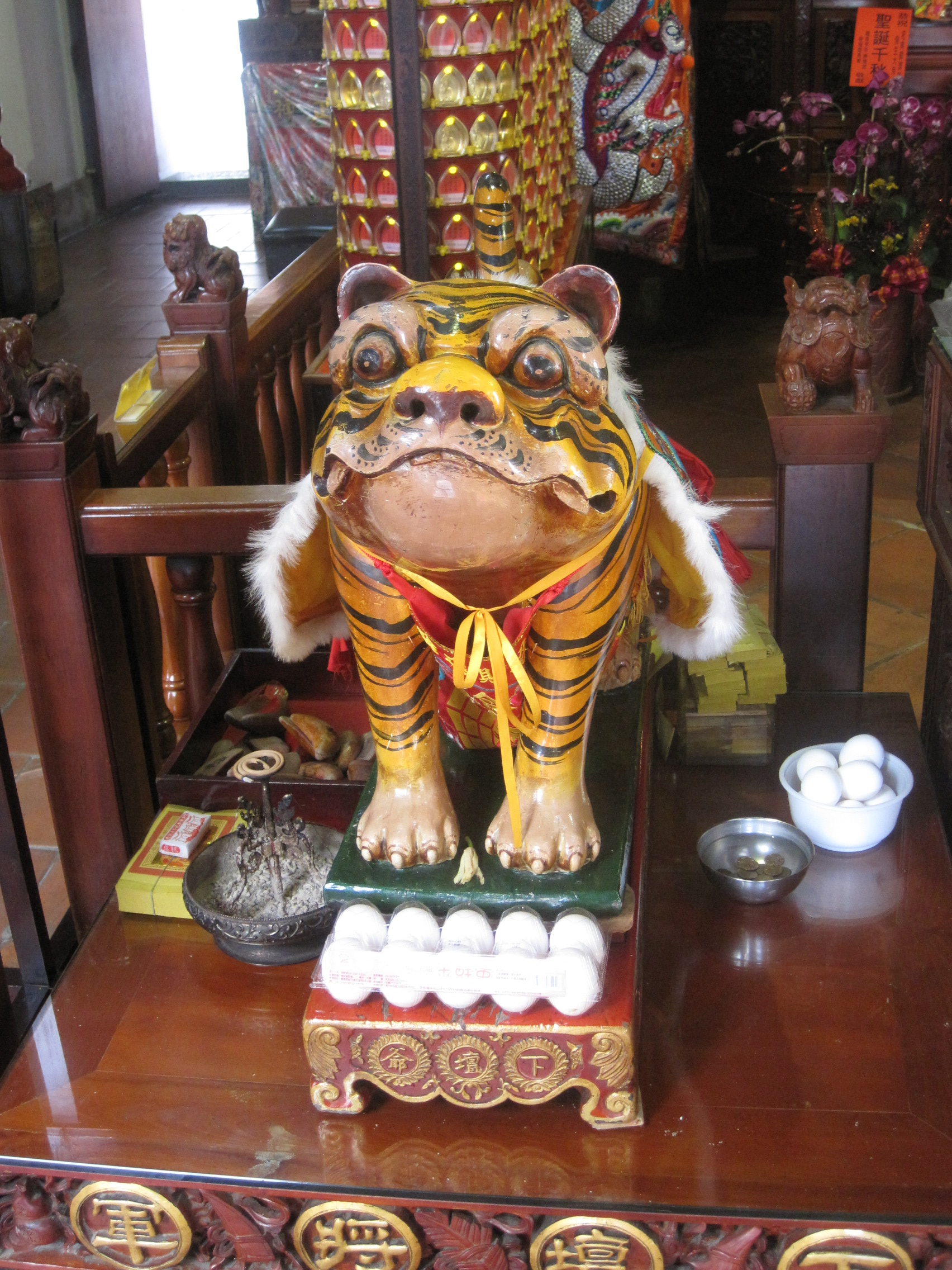
Statue of Hu Ye at Xingji Temple in Tainan.

Hu Ye (Chinese: 虎爺; Pe̍h-ōe-jī: Hó͘-iâ; lit. 'Tiger Lord'), also known as Huye Jiangjun (虎爺將軍; Hó͘-iâ-chiong-kun; 'Tiger Lord General') or Hu Jiangjun (虎將軍; Hó͘-chiong-kun; 'General Tiger'), is a tiger god in Chinese folk religion. He is worshipped as a guardian of temples and villages. In Taiwan, he is often shown as a black or yellow tiger and serves as the mount or attendant of gods such as Tudigong, mountain gods, the City God, Wangye, and Mazu. He is also called Xiatan Jiangjun (下壇將軍, "General of the Lower Altar") and Jinhu Jiangjun (金虎將軍, "Golden Tiger General").

== Origin ==
In Chinese folk belief, tigers were thought to have the power to drive away evil spirits. One story says that Tudigong and the City God caught tigers that had been harming people. The tigers became their mounts and protected people instead. Chinese settlers brought these beliefs to Taiwan, where tigers did not live in the wild.

A legend about Baosheng Dadi tells of a tiger that had swallowed a woman. A bone became stuck in its throat, and the tiger went to the god for help. Baosheng Dadi removed the bone after the tiger promised to stop harming people. The tiger then became his mount. Some versions name Sun Simiao as the doctor instead of Baosheng Dadi. The story is known as Healing the Tiger's Throat (醫虎喉) and is shown in a wall painting at Xingji Temple (興濟宮) in Tainan.

== Appearance ==
Most Hu Ye statues show a tiger standing on four legs or sitting on its hind legs. Many have round faces, large eyes, and short ears. Some look fierce, while others have a gentle or playful appearance. The statues are made from wood, stone, clay, or metal. The National Museum of Taiwan History holds black and yellow wooden tiger statues from the Qing dynasty and the Japanese colonial period.

Some statues have a tiger's head and a human body. These figures may wear military clothes and carry flags or weapons. Fuhu Temple in Shiding has several forms of Hu Ye, including winged tigers and tiger-headed generals. Its main statue is a large black tiger.

At Xinmin Hall (新民堂) in Yilan County, there are three forms: an ordinary tiger, a human body with a tiger's head, and a human figure wearing a tiger-shaped hat.

The Five Tiger Generals Temple (五虎將軍廟) at Minxiong Dashiye Temple (民雄大士爺廟) in Chiayi County has five coloured tigers: yellow, black, white, blue-green, and red. Each holds a different object or weapon in its mouth. Three other tiger statues stand behind them.

== Worship ==
Hu Ye is usually worshipped below the main altar of a temple. Some statues are placed in a small opening beneath the altar, while others have their own shrines. In Taiwan, tigers worshipped below the altar are commonly called Dihu (地虎, "Earthly Tigers"). Those placed on the altar are called Tianhu (天虎, "Heavenly Tigers"). Some temples worship Hu Ye as their main god, including Fuhu Temple (伏虎宮) in Shiding District, New Taipei City.

People pray to Hu Ye for protection against evil spirits, illness, and harmful people. He is believed to protect children and is sometimes treated as their godfather. In one traditional remedy for mumps, known in Taiwanese as zhutoupi (豬頭皮), worshippers rub ritual paper against the tiger statue's chin and place it on the swollen cheek. Some use a red brush to write the Chinese character for tiger (虎) on the affected area.

Hu Ye is worshipped for wealth as well. Some temples keep coins in a bowl of water beside his statue. Worshippers exchange their own coins for those in the bowl and keep them for good fortune. This custom is called huan qianshui (換錢水, "exchanging money water"). His role as the mount of Zhao Gongming, the Martial God of Wealth, is another reason people pray to him for money.

Offerings often include raw meat and eggs, although the customs differ between temples. Hu Ye's birthday is commonly celebrated on the sixth day of the sixth lunar month. At Xingji Temple in Tainan, worshippers bring fried chicken for his birthday. The temple holds special prayers and allows people to seek blessings from small Hu Ye statues.

During temple processions, Hu Ye may lead the way to protect the other gods. A stone tiger at Xuejia Ciji Temple (學甲慈濟宮) in Tainan takes part in the Shang Baijiao (上白礁) pilgrimage. In Penghu, some fishermen bring Hu Ye statues onto their boats for protection and a good catch. The statues are later returned to their temples.
