= Tow Boh Keong =

Taoist temple in Ipoh

Tow Boh Keong, Ipoh
- Chinese: 怡保斗母宫九皇爷庙

Religion
- Affiliation: Taoism, Buddhism
- Deity: Fulu of Tow Boh Keong
- Festival: Nine Emperor Gods Festival Goddess Golden Flower

Location
- Location: Jalan Tokong, Taman Hoover
- Municipality: Ipoh City Council
- State: Perak
- Country: Malaysia
- Interactive map of Tow Boh Keong, Ipoh
- Coordinates: 4°35′04.6″N 101°05′11.1″E

Architecture
- Type: Chinese temple
- Founder: Wang Yihou (王奕猴)
- Established: 1896

Tow Boh Keong, Nine Emperor Gods Temple (Chinese: 霹靂怡保斗母宮九皇爺廟; Jyutping: Pik1Lik1 Ji4Bou2 Dau2Mou5Gung1 Gau2Wong4Je4Miu2) is one of the oldest and largest temples in Ipoh, Perak, Malaysia. Tow Boh Keong is the Teochew dialect name for Dou Mu Temple in English.

The temple in the mid-20th century

Established in 1896, the temple is primarily dedicated to Dou Mu Yuan Jun (斗母元君), mother of the Big Dipper (北斗七星) and the Nine Emperor Gods (九皇大帝). Doumu, is a powerful Taoist deity and the celestial mother of the Nine Emperor Gods. Doumu is also the goddess of life and death. Nine Emperor Gods, are high ranking star lords, which believed to reside in the constellation of Ursa Major (大熊座). The Gods control planetary movements, human destinies, associated with healing and cosmic harmony.

== History ==
According to Chinese mythology, Nine Emperor Gods are the nine deities of the Northern Dipper. Originated in China, where the deities have long been venerated (拜斗). Archaeological evidence from around 4500 BCE at the Xishuipo site in Puyang, Henan, points to early worship of the Big Dipper. Neolithic clam-shell mosaics discovered at the site depict the asterism, suggesting that astral worship was practiced during this period. In Taoism, it is held that the Southern Dipper governs life and the Northern Dipper governs death (Chinese: 南斗注生, 北斗注死). As such, the human journey is seen as a transition from the Southern Dipper to the Northern Dipper.

The proper motion of the stars in the Big Dipper over a 100,000-year period, from 50,000 years ago to 50,000 years in the future. Because stellar motion occurs gradually over tens of millennia, stargazers of the Yangshao culture in Puyang 6,500 years ago observed virtually the same Big Dipper pattern seen today.

As Chinese migrants traveled south, they brought with them the worship of these celestial deities. The practice of performing rituals for the Northern Dipper and observing vegetarian diet during the Nine Emperor Gods Festival became deeply rooted throughout Southeast Asia.

The lineage of the Nine Emperor Gods was brought to Taiping by a devotee named Wang Jinyu (王金鱼), who obtained the sacred incense (香火) from Kathu Shrine (Thai: ศาลเจ้ากะทู้) in Phuket, Thailand.

In 1896, Wang Jinyu younger cousin Wang Yihou (王奕猴), brought the sacred incense from Taiping to Kampung Jawa area of Ipoh (then known as 坝罗), where the deities were initially enshrined in a simple thatched hut.

In 1916, the temple was relocated to Pasir Puteh, Ipoh. A public committee was formed, and the institution was officially named Tow Boh Keong (怡保斗母宮九皇爺廟). Through generous donations from the public, more than three acres of land was acquired and a proper temple complex was constructed.

In 1925, by order of the British Resident of Perak, Cecil William Chase Parr, the temple was registered in the State of Perak under the Societies Enactment 1913 of the Federated Malay States.

In 1950, the temple acquired an additional adjacent plot of one acre to facilitate future reconstruction.

In 1966, the temple committee established a reconstruction plan to build two large assembly halls. Upon completion, the number of devotees has steadily grown over the years.

Every year, Nine Emperor Gods festival bring ten of thousands of devotees and visitors throng the temple throughout the nine days celebration held in the ninth lunar month, which has become a defining part for the Chinese community in Ipoh. Devotees pray for protection, health, longevity and prosperity.

== Enshrined deities ==
Talisman (符印) of the Nine Emperor Gods

The temple enshrines a diverse pantheon of Taoist deities, Buddhist figures, deified historical heroes, and local guardian spirits. Alongside the primary altar, devotees pay respects to deities governing health, wealth, academic success, fertility, and personal protection, as well as localised tutelary spirits.

- Wang Lingguan (灵官大帝) – chief Dharma-protecting and guardian deity of Taoism
- Li Jing (李府元帅) – Pagoda-Bearing Heavenly King and Taoist martial deity
- Lei Haiqing (田都元帅) – deified Tang dynasty musician and patron deity of the performing arts
- Wu Tao (保生大帝) – deified Song dynasty physician and god of medicine
- Chen Yuanguang (开漳圣王) – deified founder of Zhangzhou
- Ancestral Kings of Min (开闽祖王) – deified founders of the Min Kingdom in Fujian
- Chen Zhaoying (清水祖师) – Patriarch Chin Swee, deified Song dynasty Buddhist monk and protector deity
- Xue Gang (薛府元帅) – Marshal Xue, legendary Tang dynasty warrior and guardian deity
- Three Kings of the Song Dynasty (宋三尊王) – deified Southern Song loyalists Wen Tianxiang, Lu Xiufu, and Zhang Shijie
- Guo Zhongfu (广泽尊王) – Revered King of Broad Compassion, deified protector deity revered for filial piety
- Lord of the Southern Dipper (南斗星君) – Taoist stellar deity governing life and longevity
- Lord of the Northern Dipper (北斗星君) – Taoist stellar deity governing destiny and mortality
- Guanyin (观音娘娘) – goddess of mercy and bodhisattva of compassion
- Zhusheng Niangniang (註生娘娘) – goddess of fertility and childbirth
- City God (城隍府主) – tutelary deity of the city
- Guandi (关帝圣君) – deified Eastern Han general and god of war, loyalty, and righteousness
- Tua Pek Kong (福德正神) – god of prosperity and local guardian deity
- Kṣitigarbha (地藏菩萨) – bodhisattva of the underworld
- God of Wealth (财神爷) – deity of prosperity and financial fortune
- Eight Immortals (八仙) – legendary Taoist immortals representing prosperity and longevity
- Wenchang Wang (文昌帝君) – god of culture, literature, and examinations
- General Fu (傅府将军) – local guardian and martial deity
- Xuanwu (玄天上帝) – Taoist warrior deity and god of the north
- Lord Wang (王府舍人) – attendant deity and local protector
- Grand Commander of the Year (值年太岁) – presiding astral deity of the current year
- Landlord Deity (地主公) – household and local earth deity
- Datuk Gong (拿督公) – local guardian spirit in Malaysian Chinese folk religion
- Celestial Master Zhang (张府天师) – founder of the Way of the Celestial Masters and Taoist patriarch
- Nezha (哪吒) – Taoist protection deity and Marshal of the Central Altar
- Muzha (木吒) – second son of Li Jing and Dharma-protecting deity
- Jinzha (金吒) – eldest son of Li Jing and guardian deity
- Zhao Gongming (赵公明元帅) – Taoist martial god of wealth and prosperity

In Buddhist cosmology, the lifespan of a deity (Sanskrit: deva) ranges from millions to billions of human years, depending on the specific realm (loka), and in the highest realms is measured in aeons (kalpas).

== Festivals ==
During the Nine Emperor Gods Festival, sacred sedan chair (圣驾) are a central feature of the Taoist celebration

The Nine Emperor Gods Festival begins with the erection of a tall pinang tree (betel palm), which is used to hoist nine-star lanterns. On the eve of the ninth lunar month of the Chinese calendar, devotees head to the nearby Sungai Kinta to welcome the deities, who are believed to arrive via waterway. A massive procession featuring lion and dragon dances takes place, with thousands of devotees dressed in white joining the parade. The spirits of the gods are then invited into a sacred urn and paraded back to the temple, escorted by spirit mediums in a trance.

On the evenings of the second, fifth, and seventh days of the ninth lunar month, devotees gather at the river to welcome the deities (接神), with the fifth evening specifically dedicated to receiving the palanquin (圣驾) of the Nine Emperor Gods.

On the morning of the sixth day, a ritual is performed to pay respects to deceased fellow devotees. Memorial tablet and joss papers are used in a Taoist salvation and merit-transfer ritual to venerate the spirits of the deceased.

During the nine-day festival, the temple performs a daily ritual to "reward the troops" (犒军) of the Five Camps of Celestial Soldiers and Generals, a spiritual patrol force believed to protect the temple and altars.

On the ninth day of the ninth lunar month, the temple holds a dramatic fire-walking ritual. Before participating, devotees must observe strict vegetarianism and sexual abstinence, refrain from consuming alcohol and drug, and be free from mourning. During the fire-walking ritual, devotees carry a yellow fulu (灵符) of the Nine Emperor Gods. In the evening, a ritual known as "Crossing the Dragon Bridge" (过龙桥) is performed to enhance one's fortune (补运), during which devotees and visitors walk across a short bridge.

Another minor festival is dedicated to the Goddess Golden Flower (金花诞), which is celebrated on the 17th day of the fourth lunar month. Celebrations begin three days prior to the actual date.

== Architecture ==
A tunnel is located beneath the main altar, which visitors traverse to receive the deity's blessing (捐枱底)

Influenced by feng shui, the temple layout follows the traditional principle of 'left Green Dragon, right White Tiger' (左青龙, 右白虎) on the walls flanking the door gods. At the front, five dragons (one on each of the four pillars and one suspended) symbolize the five Chinese elements. Beneath the main altar runs a tunnel that visitors traditionally traverse for good fortune. The temple also contains an inner chamber (内殿) dedicated to the Nine Emperor Gods, which is restricted exclusively to temple members.

The arrangement of the deities reflects the philosophy of yin and yang. At the center, Doumu as the supreme maternal star deity holds the sun (日) in her left hand and the moon (月) in her right to symbolize light and darkness, while the Southern and Northern Dipper deities sit on the left and right to represent life and death. Leigong (雷将军) stands on the left, representing lightning and yang (阳), while Taisui (大将军) stands on the right, representing star opposite Jupiter (岁星) and yin (阴). In the night sky, Jupiter shines in the same manner as the Moon. Neither celestial body generates its own light, instead reflecting sunlight. Associated with sunrise, upward growth and masculine yang energy, the left side enshrines the City God and Guandi. Associated with sunset, inward rest and feminine yin energy, the right side enshrines Zhusheng Niangniang and Guanyin.

== Heritage ==
19th-century Dipper Lamp (斗灯) in the temple

Century-old statues and ritual instruments are displayed during the Nine Emperor Gods Festival. These include the Dipper Lamp (斗灯), statues of the Marshal of the Central Altar (中坛元帅), and the Five Camp Generals (五营将军). The Dipper Lamp is used during Taoist prayer rituals. In Taoist belief, the North Star governs human life, death, wealth, and status. Based on a person's time of birth, practitioners identify their corresponding guardian star deity. The purpose of the Dipper Lamp prayer ritual is to ward off misfortune, avert calamities, dispel evil, and prolong life. A Dipper Lamp typically consists of ritual instruments—such as an oil lamp, rice bucket, mirror, sword, scale, scissors, and lamp umbrella—that correspond to the five cardinal directions and the five elements (Wuxing). The use of the Dipper Lamp is an ancient Taoist practice dating back over two millennia.

== Culture ==
A performance of "Opera to Thank the Gods" (酬神戲)

During the Nine Emperor Gods Festival, Chinese opera troupes perform nightly for the deities, elders and devotees. The performances are primarily Cantonese opera. Throughout the nine-day festival, the temple hall also host a trade fair. In January 2024, the temple co-organised an event with BSY Cultural Arts to feature 508 Chinese drums performing simultaneously. The feat broke Malaysia's record and was officially inducted into The Malaysia Book Of Records.

== Tradition ==
At the start of the Lunar New Year, devotees visit the temple to "pray to Taisui" (拜太岁), particularly those whose Chinese zodiac sign clashes with or "offends" (犯太岁) the presiding deity of the year.

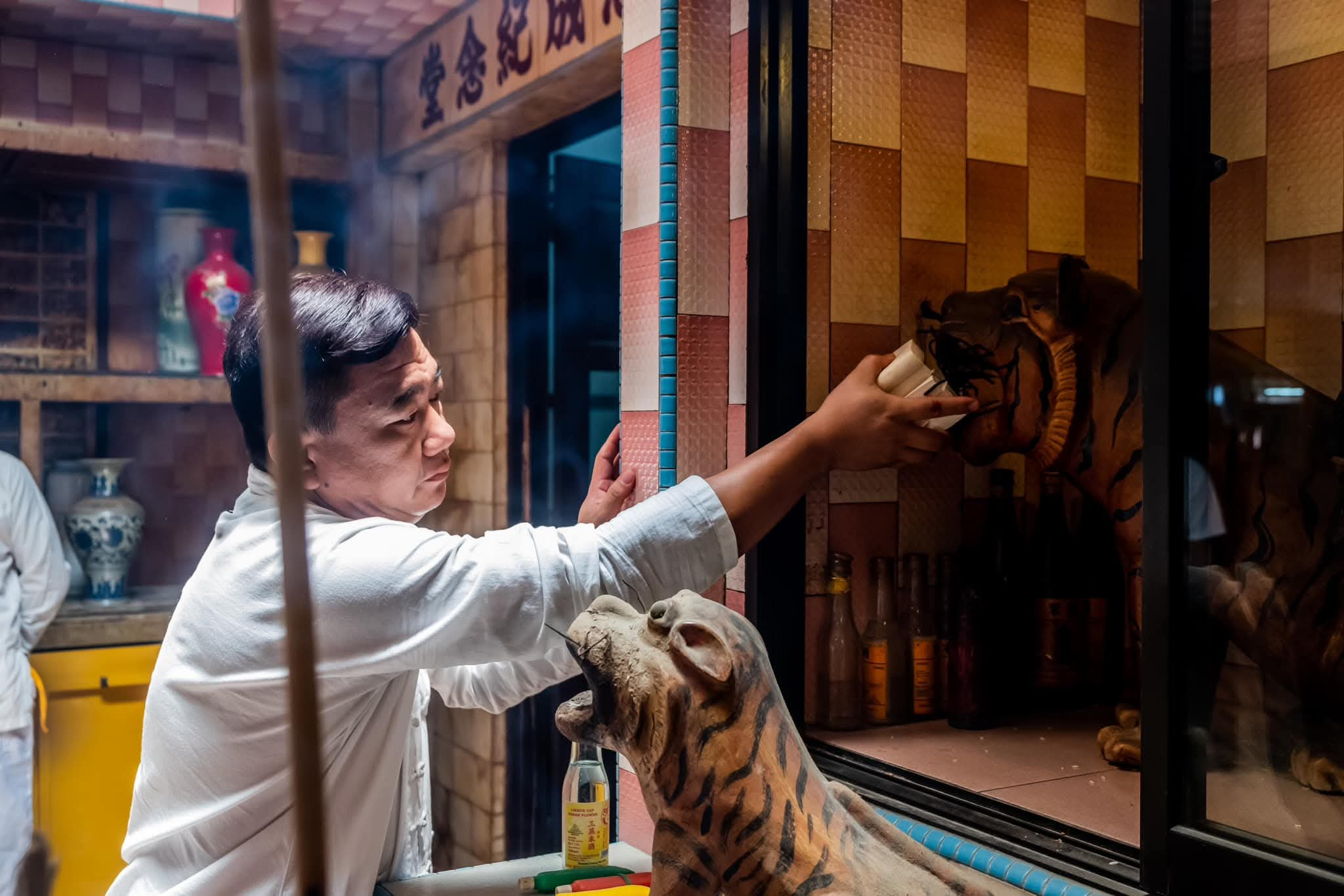
Statues of Hu Ye (虎爷), the tiger deity in Chinese folk religion

During Jingzhe (around March 5 or 6), worshippers pray to the Tiger Deity (虎爷). Known in Malaysia, Singapore, and southern Chinese traditions as the day the White Tiger opens its mouth (拜虎开口), devotees offer raw pork, eggs, and lard to appease the deity, ward off petty people or backstabbers (小人), and prevent gossip and misfortune for the year.

Toward the end of the lunar year, typically before the Winter Solstice (around December 21 or 22), devotees return to the temple to express "gratitude to Taisui" (谢太岁) for protection throughout the year.

Throughout the year, visitors and devotees practice kau cim, or lottery poetry (求签). They typically seek guidance on major life areas and personal decisions, such as career and business (事业), wealth and finances (财运), love and relationships (爱情), health and well-being (健康), study and exams (学业), family and home (家宅), and general matters (其他). This method of divination traces its roots to the Shang dynasty, which initially used tortoise shells for oracle bone divination before transitioning to bamboo sticks by the Jin dynasty and gaining widespread adoption in temples during the Song dynasty.

== Visits by notable people ==
From left: Perak State Legislative Assembly Deputy Speaker Jenny Choy, Pasir Pinji assemblyman Goh See Hua, Minister of Housing and Local Government Nga Kor Ming, and Ipoh Timor MP Howard Lee presenting a mock cheque to the temple committee in 2025.

- In 1968, Deputy Prime Minister Abdul Razak Hussein announced a RM70,000 government allocation under the Alliance Party for the temple's reconstruction.
- In 2013, Prime Minister Najib Razak and former Prime Minister Mahathir Mohamad attended a 1Malaysia luncheon banquet hosted by the Chinese community at Tow Boh Keong Hall.
- In 2013, Hong Kong actor Ray Lui visited the temple during promotional and premiere events for his film "The Biography of Siddhartha" (釋迦牟尼佛傳).
- In 2025, Minister of Housing and Local Government Nga Kor Ming, accompanied by local elected representatives and community leaders, visited the temple to present a RM125,615 grant from the Ministry of Housing and Local Government for the maintenance of non-Islamic houses of worship under the Malaysia Madani initiative.

== Gallery ==
Configuration of five dragons in Tianshen (天神) altar

Menshen (门神) painting on the centre door. It is traditionally believed to be used by deities

Plaque of Marshal Li (李府元帅) installed in 1923

The Malaysia Book Of Records: 508 drummers performance

Nine Emperor Gods Festival Fair

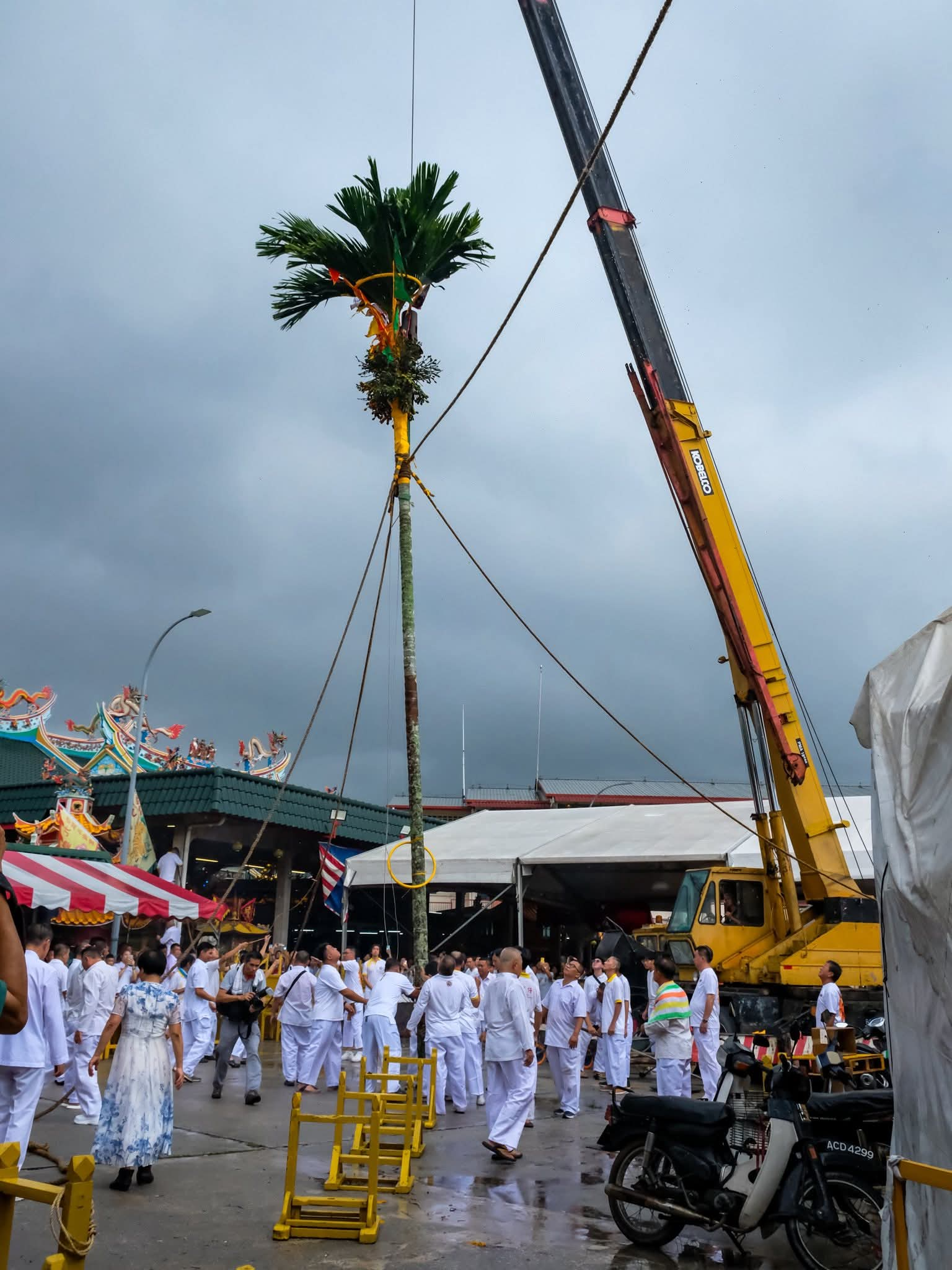
Nine Emperor Gods Festival begins with the erection of a tall pinang tree (betel palm), which is used to hoist nine-star lanterns

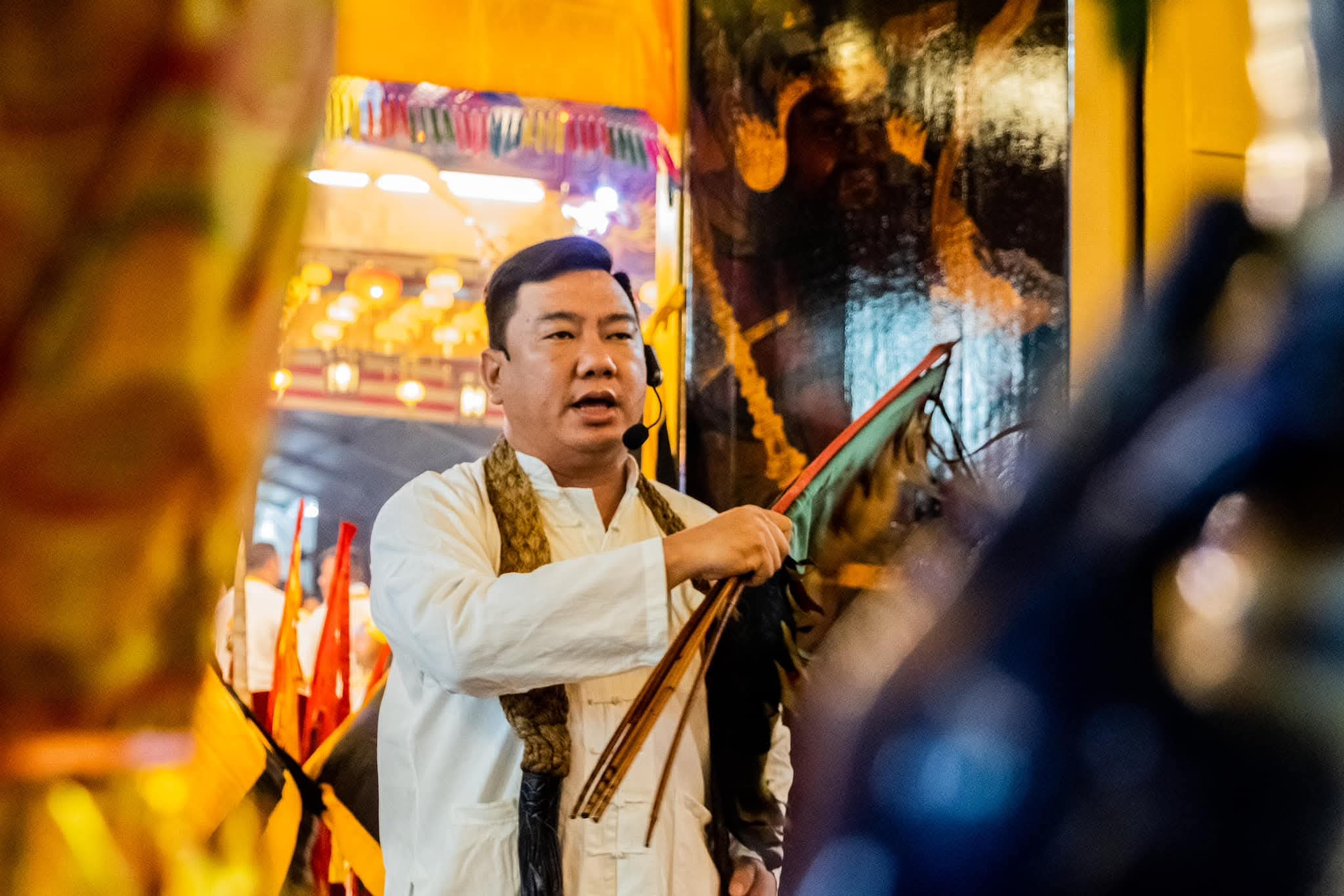
Taoist priest chanting mantra to invoke deity spirit

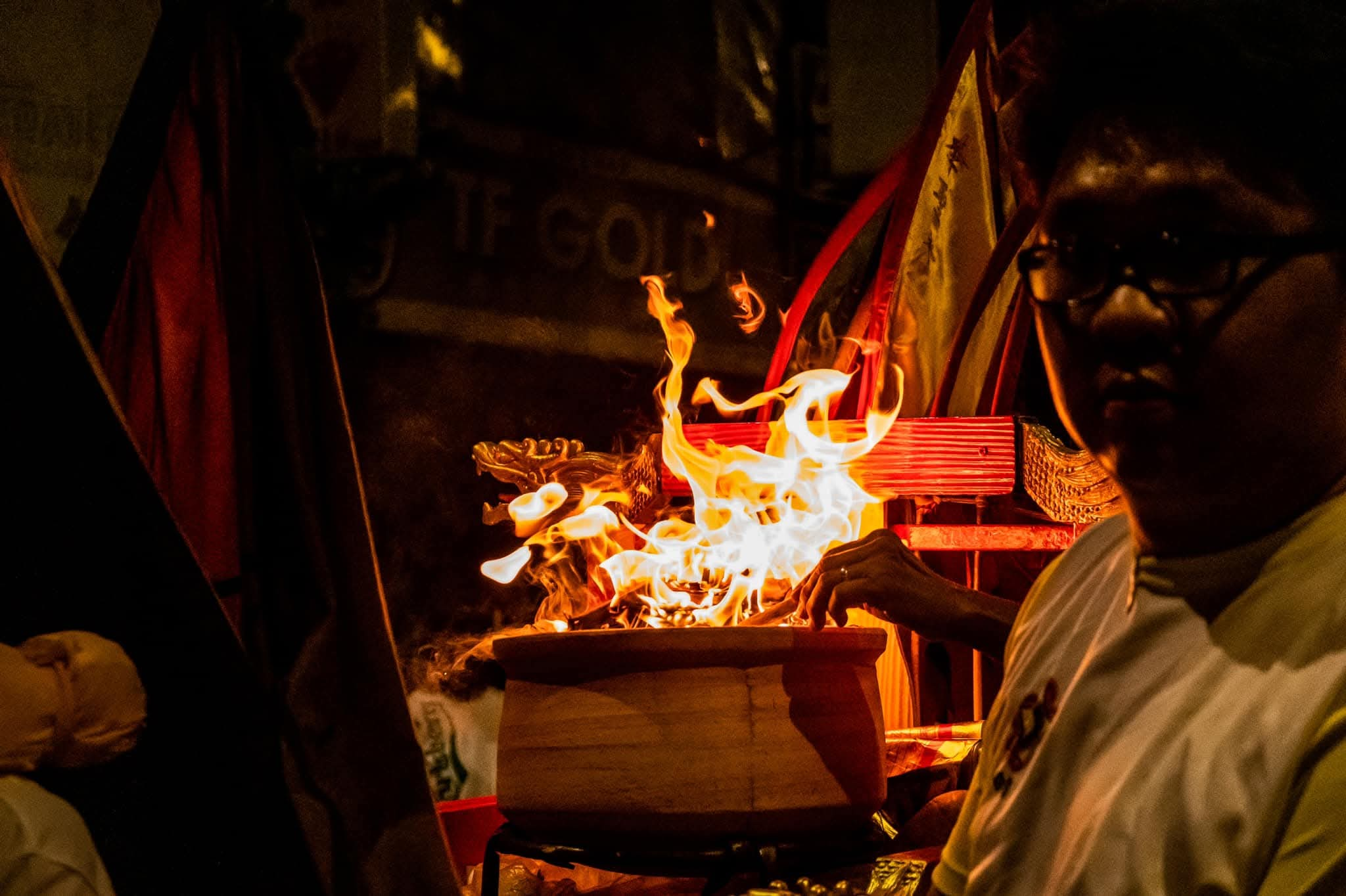
The sacred urns (正副炉) represent the presence of the Nine Emperor Gods during the nine-day festival

19th-century statues of the Five Camp Generals (五营将军) in the temple

A guardian lion (石狮) in front of the temple

Dragon dances are performed as part of the annual Nine Emperor Gods Festival celebrations

Maching Cultural and Sports Association (马青) in Perak performing fire-breathing during the street parade of Nine Emperor Gods Festival

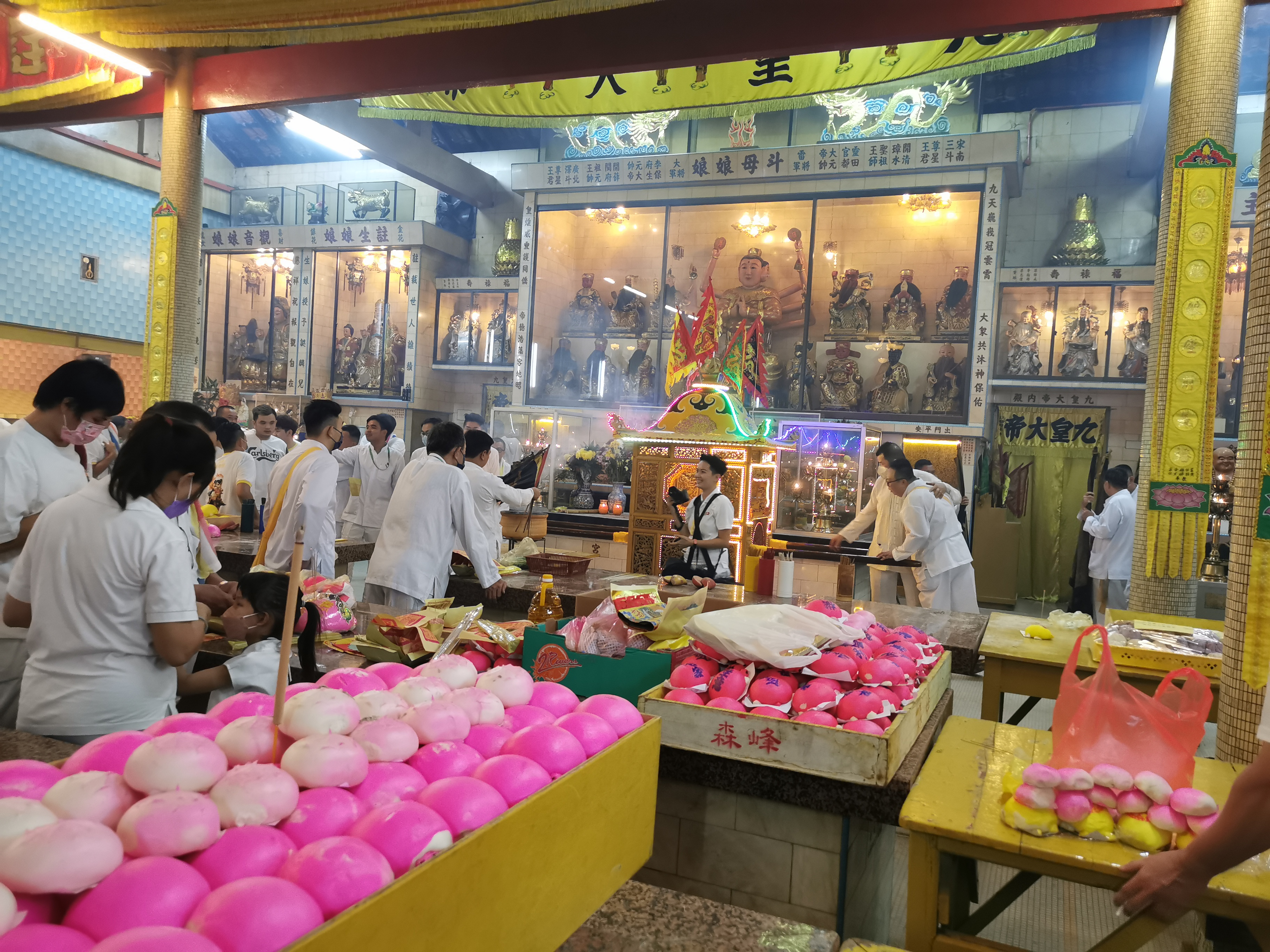
Devotees offer steamed tortoise buns during the Nine Emperor Gods Festival to symbolize longevity. The buns are traditionally dyed bright pink, red, or yellow. Red and pink represent good fortune and joy, while yellow is considered the imperial color of the deities.

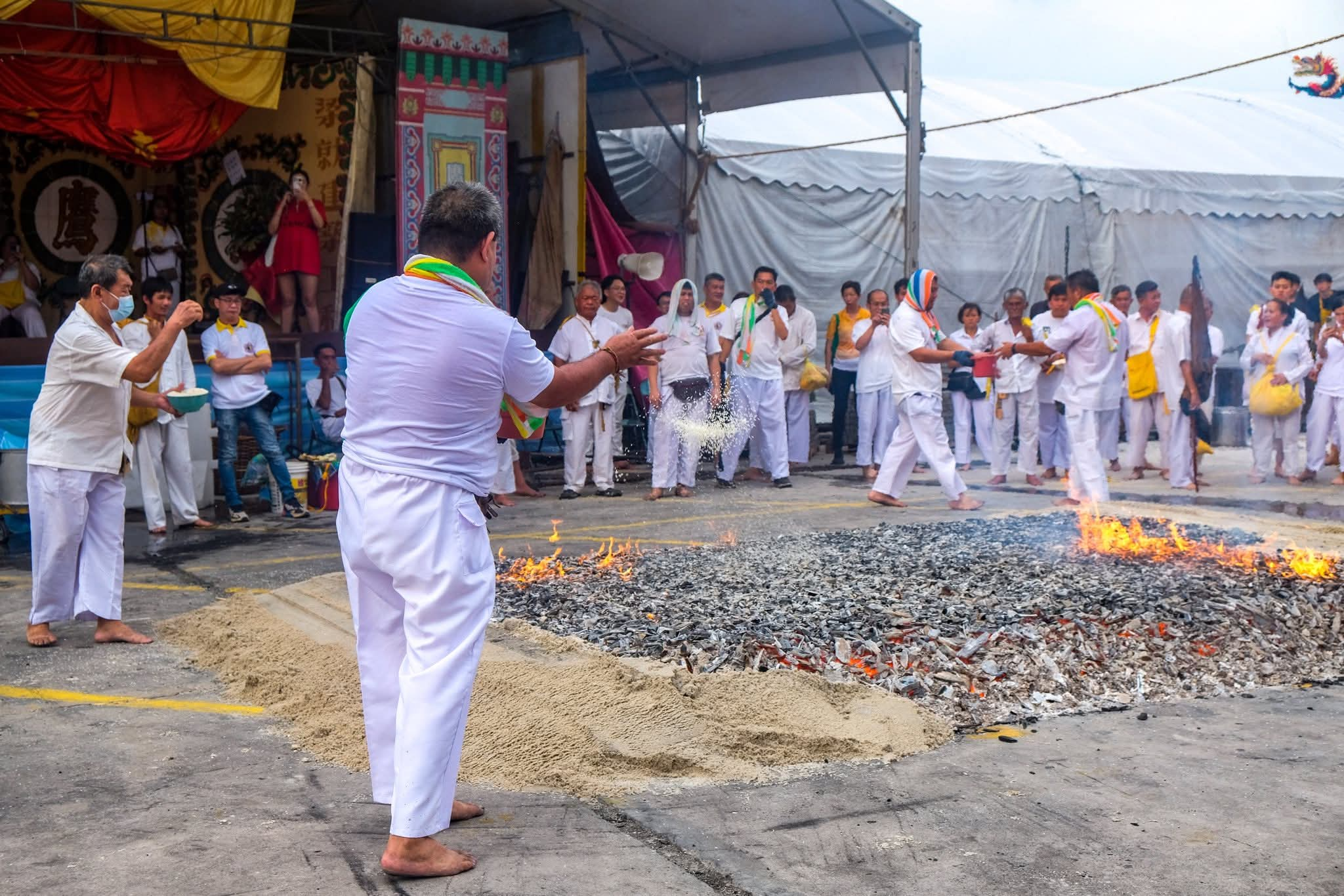
Fire-walking (过火坑) serves as a rite of cosmic renewal, believed to wash away the previous year’s sins, bad luck, and misfortune. Practitioners hold that the ceremony brings health, peace, and longevity to the participating community

Send-off ceremony concluding the Nine Emperor Gods Festival, symbolically escorting the deities back to the heavens via waterways (迴銮)
