= Nine Emperor Gods Festival =

Taoist celebration in Southeast Asia

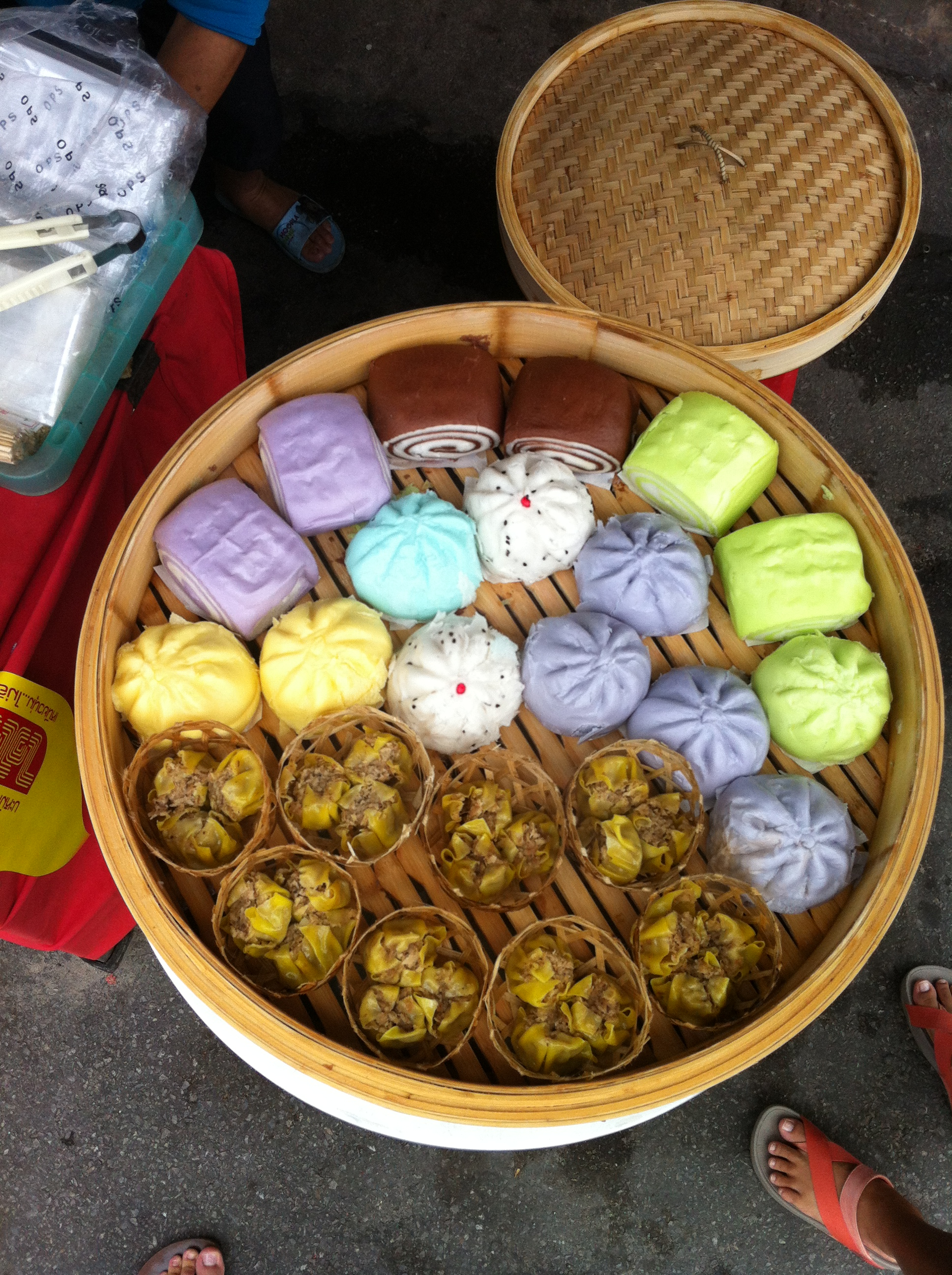
- During the Vegetarian Festival in Thailand, streets are filled with food stalls offering vegan Thai and Chinese food, e.g. buns and dim sums with mushrooms.
- Official name: Vegetarian Festival or Jay Festival
- Observed by: Taoists
- Significance: To commemorate to honour the gods on a large scale for nine days
- Celebrations: Praying, eating pure vegan food
- Observances: Offering food, burning joss paper, chanting of scriptures
- Date: 1st night of the 9th lunar month

The Nine Emperor Gods Festival (Min Nan Chinese: 九皇爺誕; Malay: Perayaan Sembilan Maharaja Dewa; Thai: เทศกาลกินเจ or เทศกาลกินผัก (called in southern Thailand)) or Vegetarian Festival or Jay Festival is a nine-day Taoist celebration beginning on the eve of the ninth lunar month of the Chinese calendar, celebrated primarily in Southeast Asian countries such as Malaysia, Singapore, Indonesia and Southern Thailand by the Peranakans community. In Thailand, this festival is called thetsakan kin che (เทศกาลกินเจ), the Vegetarian Festival. It is celebrated throughout Thailand, with the festivities at their height in Phuket, where over the half of the population is Peranakans. The Phuket Vegetarian Festival attracts crowds of spectators because of many of the unusual religious rituals that are performed. The Vegetarian Festival takes place at the same time as the Hindu festival Navaratri.

Nine Emperor Gods Festival

Chinese name
- Traditional Chinese: 九皇爺誕
Transcriptions
Standard Mandarin
- Hanyu Pinyin: Jiǔhuángyé Dàn
Yue: Cantonese
- Yale Romanization: Gáuwòhngyèh Daan
Southern Min
- Hokkien POJ: Káu-hông-iâ Tàn

Thai name
- Thai: เทศกาลกินเจ
- RTGS: Thetsakan Kinche

Malay name
- Malay: Perayaan Sembilan Maharaja Dewa ڤراياءن سمبيلن مهاراج ديوا

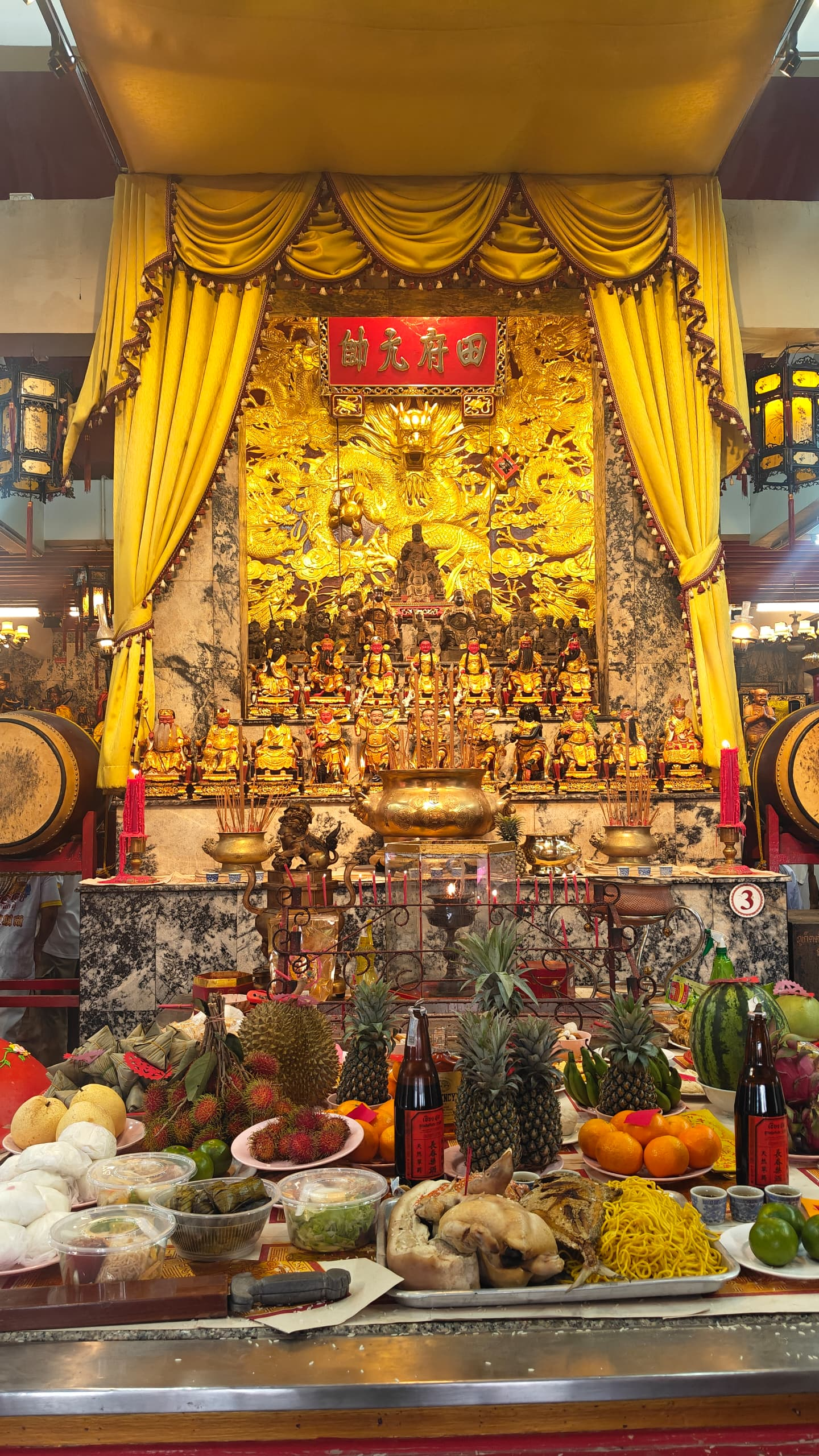
Kathu Shrine established in the early 1800s. The earliest and historical birthplace of the Nine Emperor Gods worship in Southeast Asia region.

== Celebration in Thailand ==
=== Vegan food ===
During the Vegetarian Festival, shops in Phuket and throughout Thailand display red and yellow jay flags (เจ) to indicate they are serving appropriate vegan food for observant participants. Vegan food is prepared because it is considered the most pure.

During the festival, food stalls sell Thai and Chinese food made without animal products. Noodle dishes, curries and soups are prepared without meat, fish sauce, eggs or dairy. Realistic vegetarian meats are used instead. The dishes are prepared without the use of garlic, chili, or strong spices. Many varieties of tofu are prepared and sold during the festival. Popular dishes are vegetarian pink noodle soup, which uses mushrooms to substitute pork blood cubes, fried tofu, deep-fried spring roll, and fried taro.

=== Self-purification ===
In addition to eating pure food, festival participants must keep their thoughts pure and wear white as a symbol of purity. Also to maintain purity devout festival participants abstain from sex, alcohol and stimulants during the festival.

=== Festival locations ===
Phuket has the largest festival, but many other cities in Thailand celebrate the festival as well.

Bangkok and Chiang Mai also have many vendors selling vegan food during the festival. In 2023, the Michelin Guide-listed restaurant at the Carlton Hotel Bangkok Sukhumvit advertised an extensive vegetarian menu for the festival. Hat Yai had more than 100 vegetarian food stalls during the 2022 festival. It was also reported that Chinese temples in Hat Yai stockpiled vegetarian food in advance of the festival and hired more people. Many tourists come from Malaysia.

Nan also has many vendors selling vegan food during the festival. The American chef Dan Sriprasert used the vegan recipes he learned to make at his mother's food stall in Nan during the festival to create the menu for the popular Green Elephant Vegetarian Bistro in the United States.

Malls in Thailand participate in the festival that include the CentralWorld, Central Phuket, Central Pattana, and Central Hatyai.

=== Economic impact ===
The Vegetarian Festival has significant economic impact on the nation. In 2023, the festival was forecast to generate revenue of 44.6 billion baht, a forecast 5.5% increase over 2022 revenue and the highest in 10 years.

== Introduction to the Nine Emperor Gods ==
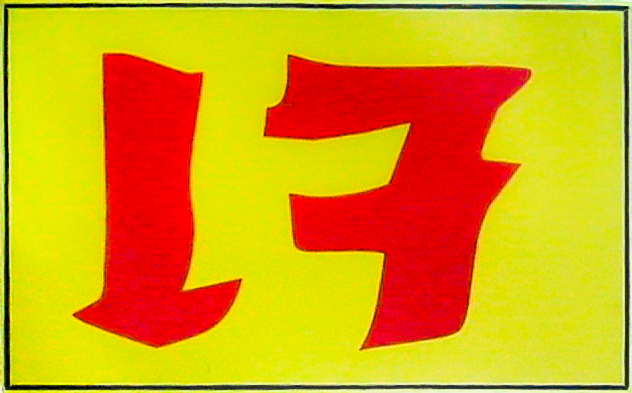
The characters เจ as often shown on stickers or flags to indicate that food is vegetarian. The characters have been stylised to be more reminiscent of Chinese writing.

The Nine Emperor Gods Jiǔ Huáng Xīng Jūn / Jiǔ Huáng Da Di (九皇星君/九皇大帝) are the nine sons manifested by Father Emperor Zhou Yu Dou Fu Yuan Jun (斗父周御國王天尊) and Mother of the Big Dipper Dou Mu Yuan Jun (斗母元君) who holds the Registrar of Life and Death. Today, most Nine Emperor God temples do not acknowledge the existence of Dou Fu Yuan Jun. However, Dou Fu Yuan Jun is invoked alongside Dou Mu Yuan Jun in Great Dipper Honouring known as Li Dou (禮斗) ceremonies.

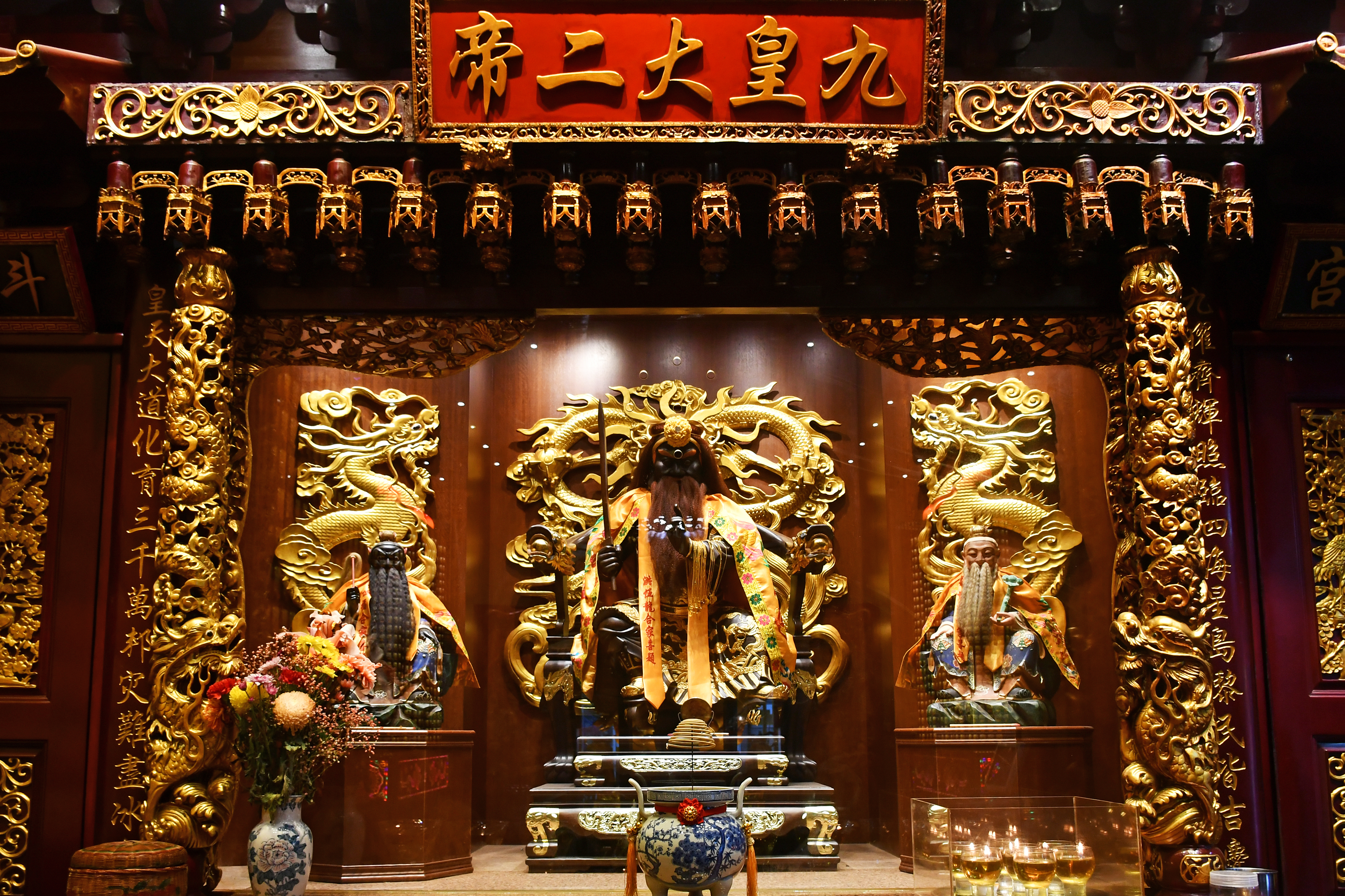
Altar of the Second Emperor of the Nine Emperor Gods Altar at Leong Nam Temple, Singapore.

According to Rev. Long Hua, the 35th generation Taoist priest from Singapore, honouring the Northern Dipper stars prolongs one's life, eliminate calamities, and absolves sins and past debts of oneself and his family. The term Ye (爺) as in Jiu Huang Ye (九皇爺) loosely translates as "Grandfather", a title worshipers commonly use to bring a more intimate relationship between themselves and the Nine Emperors. The Nine Emperor Gods should not be mixed up with the Wang Ye or Princes of the Ming loyalists. Popular folk culture has it that the Nine Emperor Gods are actually loyalists of the Ming dynasty who fought against Qing dynasty. According to Long Hua, this information is inaccurate and considered derogatory to the actual teachings of Taoism as the Nine Emperor Gods are actually high-ranking Star Lords who preside over the movement of planets and coordinate mortal Life and Death issues. The Nine Emperors is formed by the seven stars of the Big Dipper of the North Ursa Major (visible) and two assistant stars (invisible to most people). The Nine Emperor Stars are:

1. Tan Lang Tai Xing Jun (貪狼太星君)1st Star (Visible) Bayer: α UMa
2. Ju Men Yuan Xing Jun (巨門元星君) 2nd Star (Visible) Bayer: β UMa
3. Lu Cun Zhen Xing Jun (祿存貞星君) 3rd Star (Visible) Bayer: γ UMa
4. Wen Qu Niu Xing Jun (文曲紐星君) 4th Star (Visible) Bayer: δ UMa
5. Yu Lian Zhen Gang Xing Jun (玉廉貞綱星君) 5th Star (Visible) Bayer: ε UMa
6. Wu Qu Ji Xing Jun (武曲紀星君) 6th Star (Visible) Bayer: ζ UMa
7. Po Jun Guan Xing Jun (破軍關星君) 7th Star (Visible) Bayer: η UMa
8. Zuo Fu Da Dao Xing Jun (左輔大道星君) 8th Star (Invisible)
9. You Bi Da Dao Xing Jun (右弼大道星君) 9th Star (Invisible)

== Nine Emperor Gods Festival celebration in popular folk culture ==
On the eve of the lunar ninth month, temples dedicated to Nine Emperor Gods will conduct an important ceremony to invoke and welcome the Nine Emperor Gods. Since the arrival of the Nine Emperor Gods is believed to be descending through the waterways, processions are held from temples to the seashore or river to symbolize this belief. Devotees dressed in traditional white, carrying incense and candles, await for their arrival.

A carnival-like atmosphere pervades the temple throughout the nine-day festival. During this period of time, the constant tinkling of a prayer bell and chants from the temple priests or mediums are heard. Most devotees stay at the temple, eat vegetarian meals, maintain celibacy and recite continuous chanting of prayer. It is believed that there will be rain throughout the nine days of the celebration.

The ninth day of the festival is its climax. An important procession that draws thousands of devotees to send the Nine Emperor Gods back via waterways.

== Phuket ritualized mutilation ==
In accordance with the traditions, many religious mediums will conduct ritualized mutilation upon themselves and one another while under a trance-like state, including but not limited to: impaling through cheeks, arms, face, legs, back etc., with everything from as small as syringes to as large as is agreed upon between all members; partial skinning (the skin is not removed, just cut and flipped over); slashing of limbs, chest, stomach and especially tongue with swords, axes and knives; bloodletting; removal of tissue (normally limited to cysts) and intentionally wrapping or standing near fire crackers as they are lit.

This is done without anaesthetic, always inside or near the temples surrounded by other devotees with only iodine, petroleum jelly and surgical gloves as precautionary measures. Despite this scenario, many of the people performing the rituals are also the people who will care for many of the people in their recovery.

To this effect few people ever need to have prolonged medical treatment, and although in the weeks after the festival many people will be seen covered in bandages, scarring is uncommon, stitching, even on individual devotees who impale their cheeks, is rare, and return to daily activity for the devotees occurs shortly after the completion of the ritual, frequently before the festival ends unless performed on the last days, much sooner than before the bandages themselves are removed.

The purpose of this practice is a mixture of veneration for their gods and ancestors, to display their devotion to their beliefs and the trance itself, which has a profound impact upon demeanour for days or weeks after, frequently with devotees appearing exceptionally calm and focused in their day-to-day activities after the festival is completed.

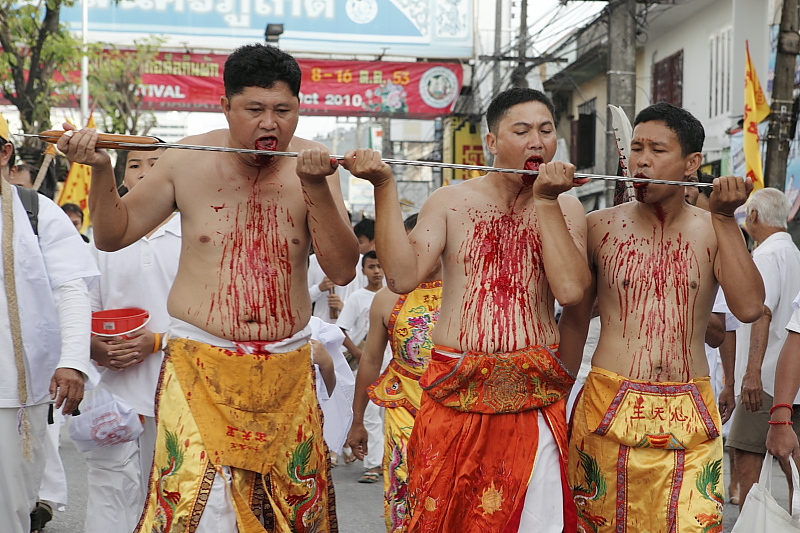
Tongue slashing in Phuket

=== Jeh ===
During a period of nine days, those who are participating in the festival dress all in white and ghin jeh กินเจ, which has come to be translated as abstinence from eating meat, poultry, seafood, and dairy products. Vendors and proprietors of restaurants indicate that jeh food is for sale at their establishments by putting a yellow flag out with the word เจ (jeh) written on it in red. However, technically, only food prepared in the sacred kitchen of the Chinese temple (in Thailand, called sarnjao ศาลเจ้า or um อ๊ำ) is jeh, as it must undergo a series of rituals before it can be given that name.

=== Masong ===
Masong ม้าทรง are the people who invite the spirits of gods to possess their bodies. Ma ม้า is the word for horse in Thai, and the name masong refers to how the spirits of the gods use the bodies of these people as a vehicle, as one rides a horse. Only pure, unmarried men or women without families of their own can become masong. At the temple they undergo a series of rituals to protect them for the duration of the festival, during which flagellation and self-mutilation is practiced. The masong tradition which is similar to Tâng-ki also exist among the Chinese communities in Singapore and Malaysia during this festival.

According to an early-nineteenth-century interpretation of Chinese Taoism by a local community of Chinese immigrant miners, the Nine Emperor Gods descend from poles located in the shrine's yards and incarnate by using the bodies of the participants as shells for walking on Earth. The participants who prepare to volunteer their bodies to the gods are called the Ma Song. During the main ritual at the temples, the Ma Song fall into a trance and pierce their cheeks with ritual objects, including knives, spears, relics, and other items of personal significance. Then, the Ma Song demonstrate their submission by presenting their expressive forms of self-mutilation in a public procession. In his research project starting in 2012, Schneider identified the affective states of the Ma Song that reflected a religious frame of submission. While in Western cultures dominance is seen as a cherished goal, Schneider observed an unusual appreciation of submission amongst the Ma Song. This might be generalizable to other religious practices where believers submit in devotion. This study has been made possible through the support by Fulbright Scholar grant PD2082693, the National Research Council of Thailand in Bangkok, and the members of the Phuket Provincial Cultural Office. Dr. Schneider was depicted on his research site in a National Geographic documentation by Morgan Freeman.

The festivities in Phuket include a procession of masong wearing elaborate costumes who pierce their cheeks and tongues with all manner of things, including swords, banners, machine guns, table lamps, and flowers. While the face is the most common area pierced, some also pierce their arms with pins and fishhooks. Teams of people accompany the masong to keep their wounds clean and to help support the heavier piercings. It is believed that while they are possessed the masong will not feel any pain. They can also be seen shaking their heads back and forth continually, and usually do not seem to "see" their surroundings. At the temple during the festival there is also firewalking and blade-ladder climbing. While large crowds of people gather to watch, the entranced mah song distribute blessed candy and pieces of orange cloth with Chinese characters printed on them yan ยันต์ for good luck.

== Gallery ==
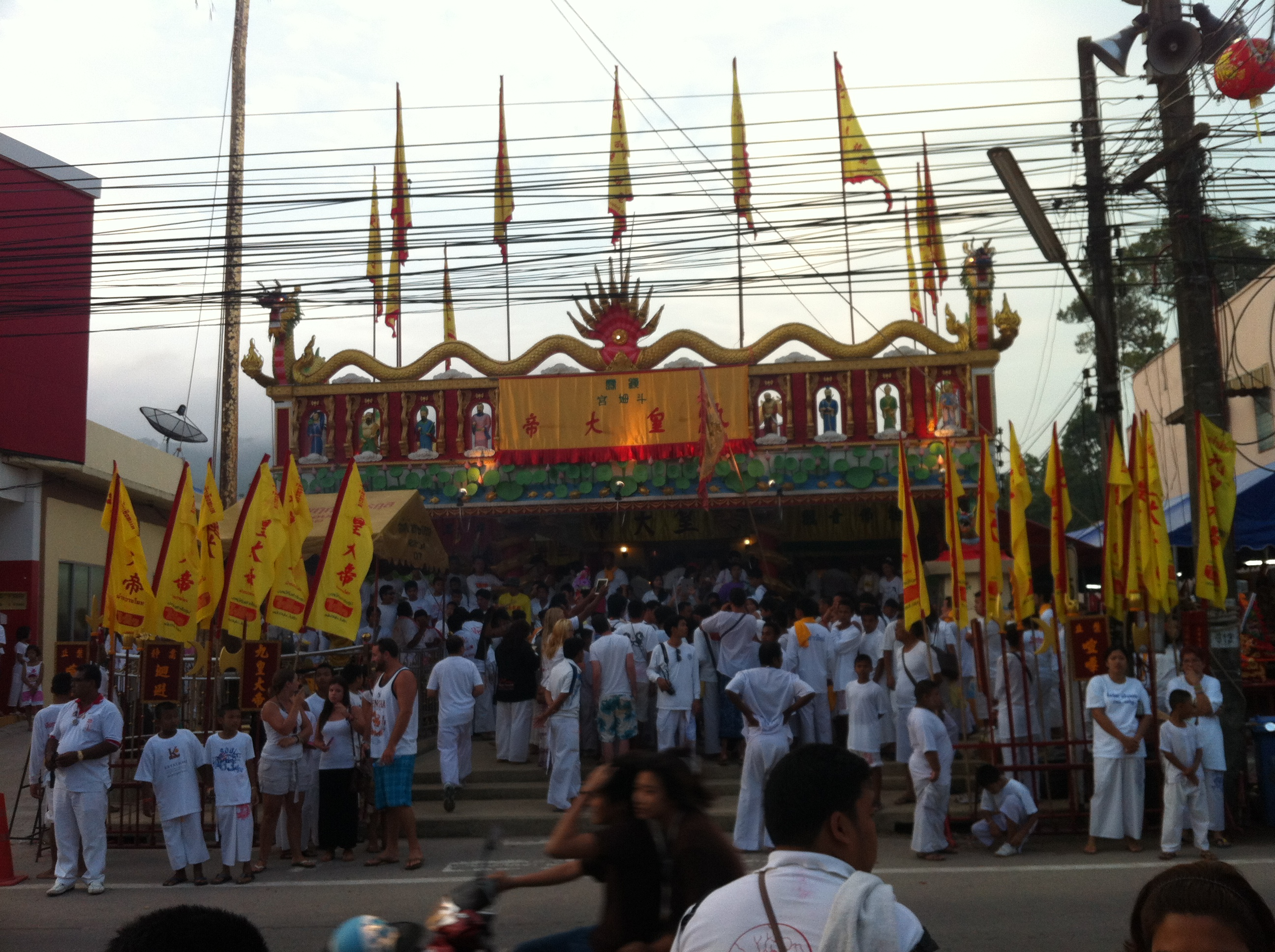
People gathering around an am from early morning to witness piercing ceremony and to participate in the parade afterwards

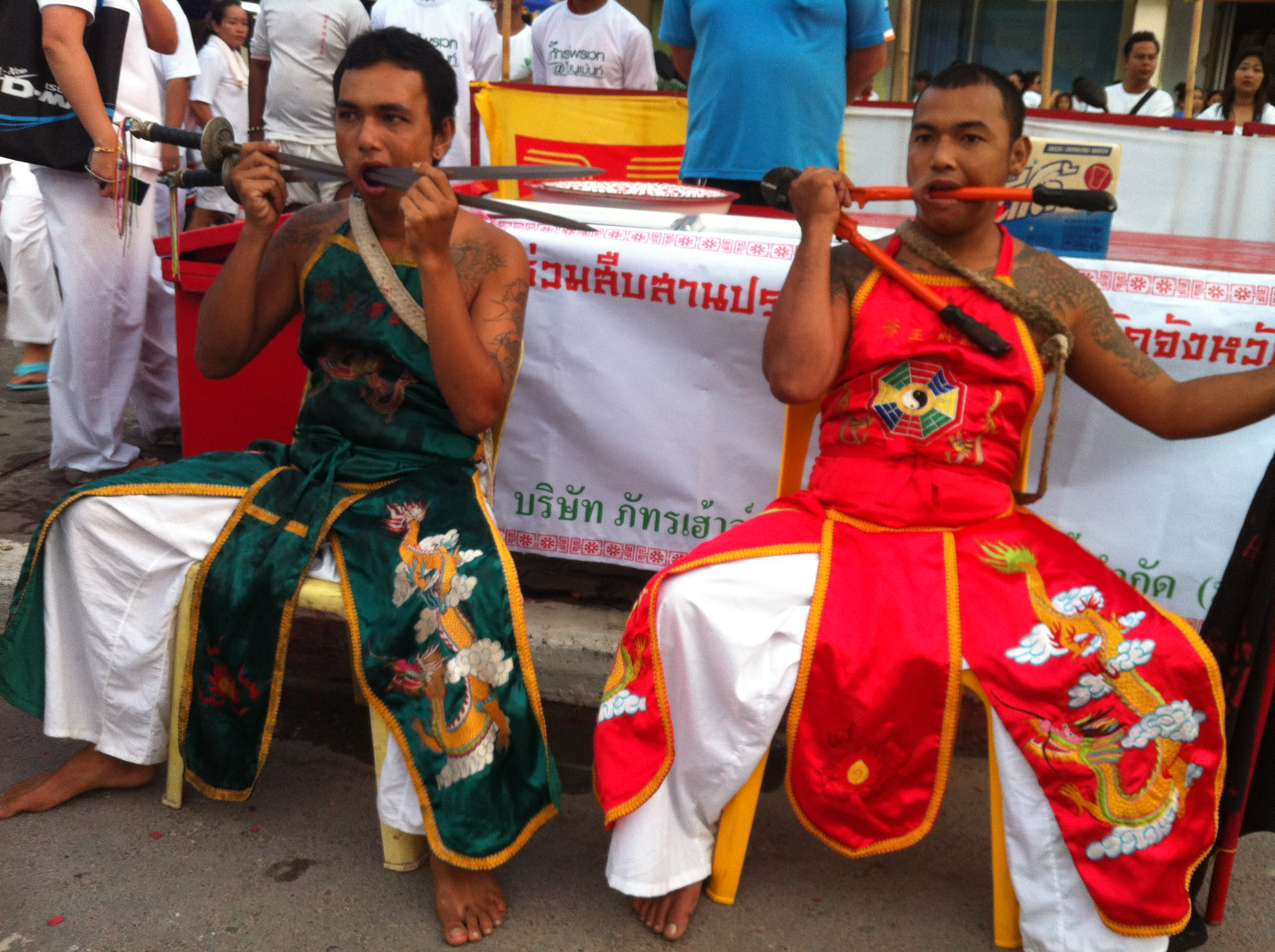
Masong are getting ready to participate in the morning parade starting from one of the am in Western Phuket

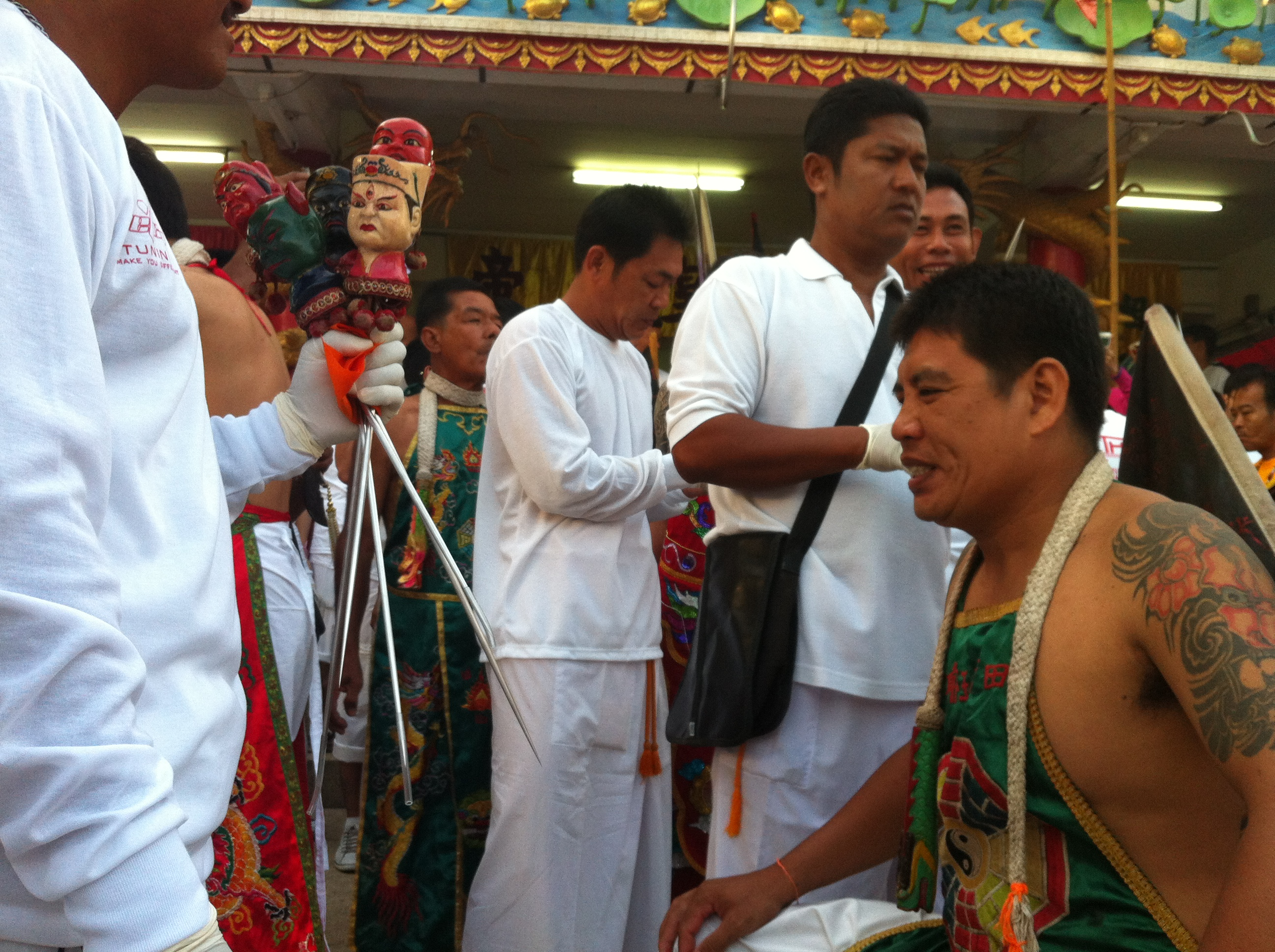
Masong pending to have his cheeks pierced

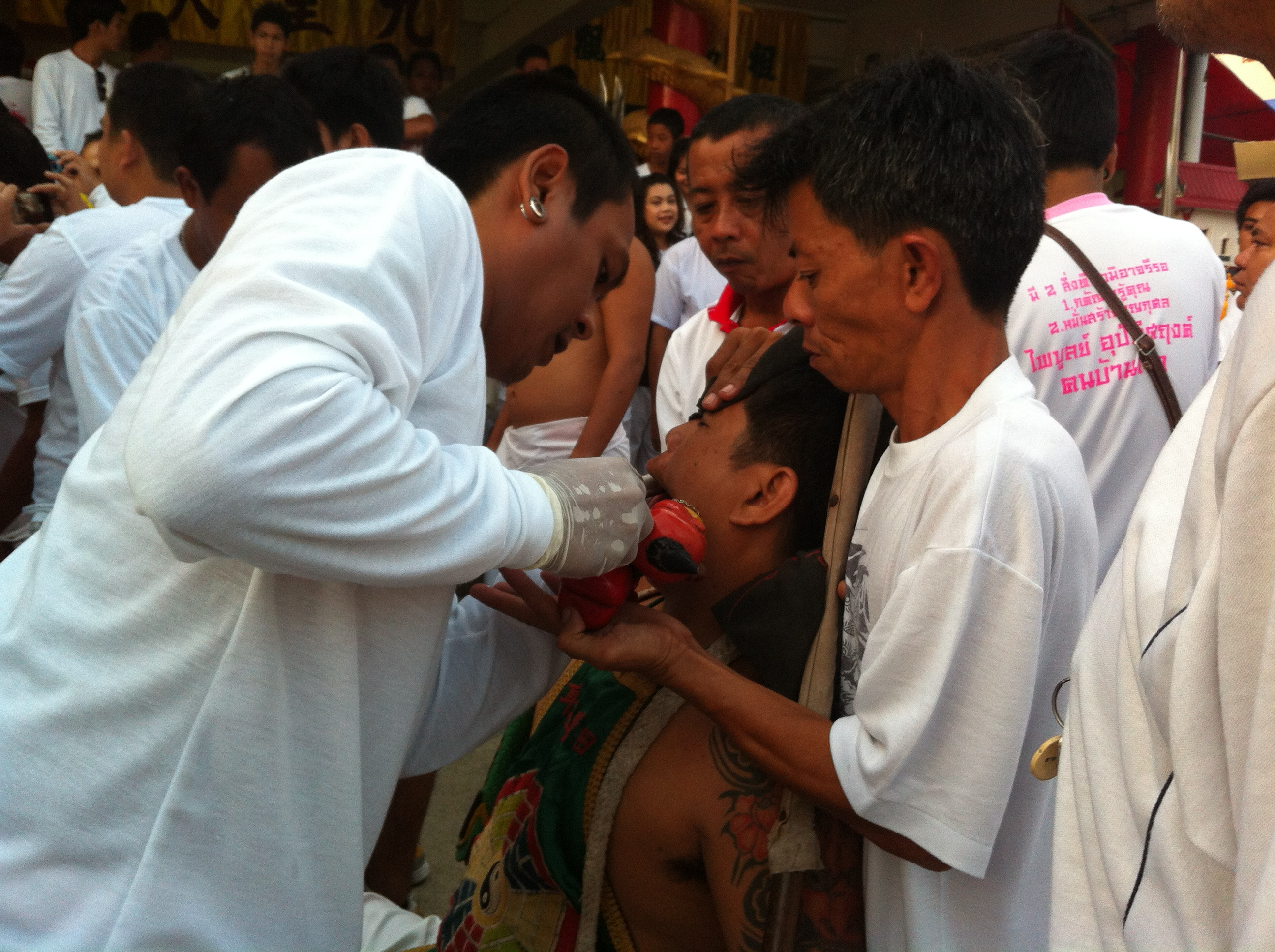
Piercing is supervised by medical staff and performed using special instruments

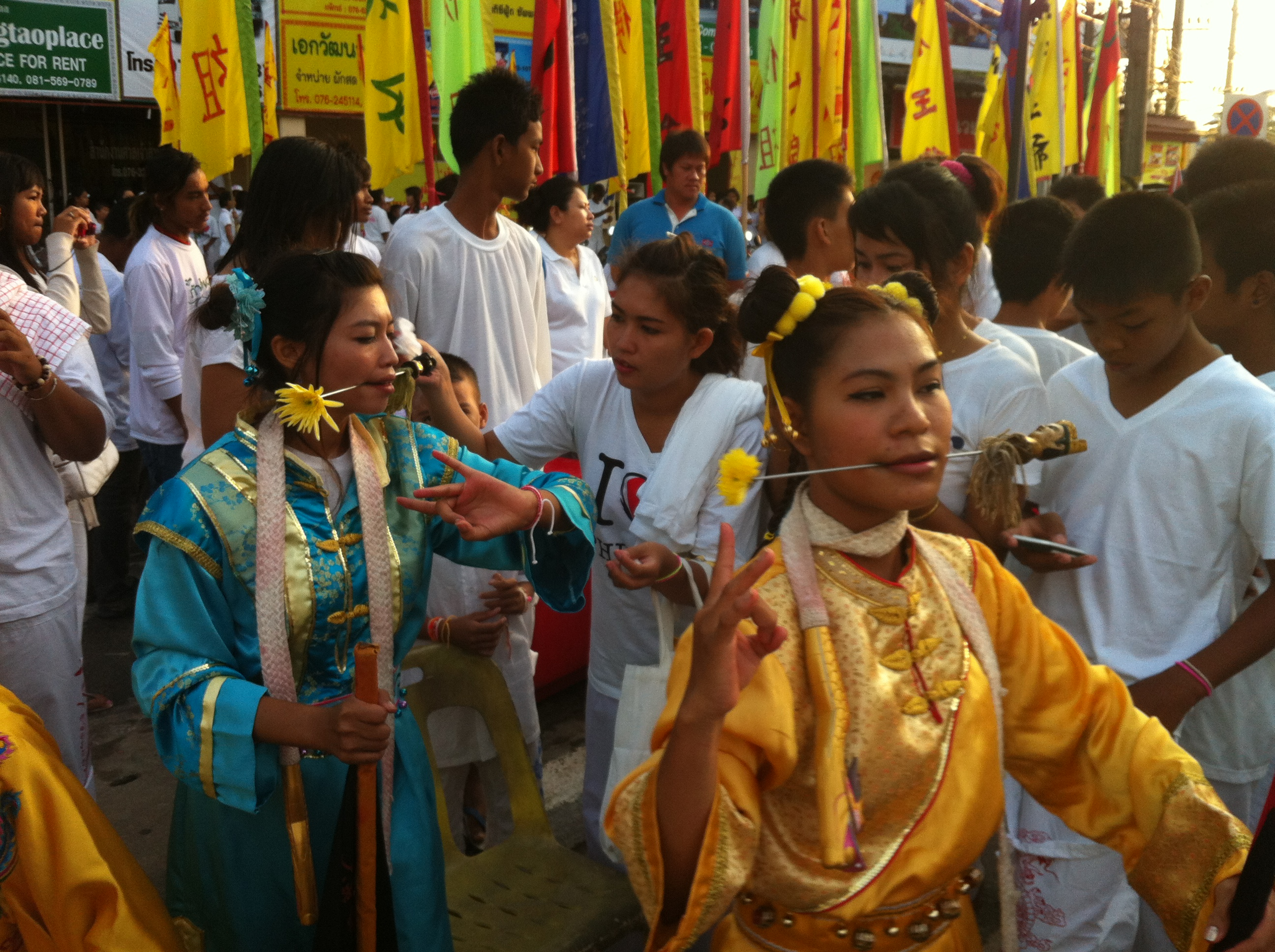
Female masong

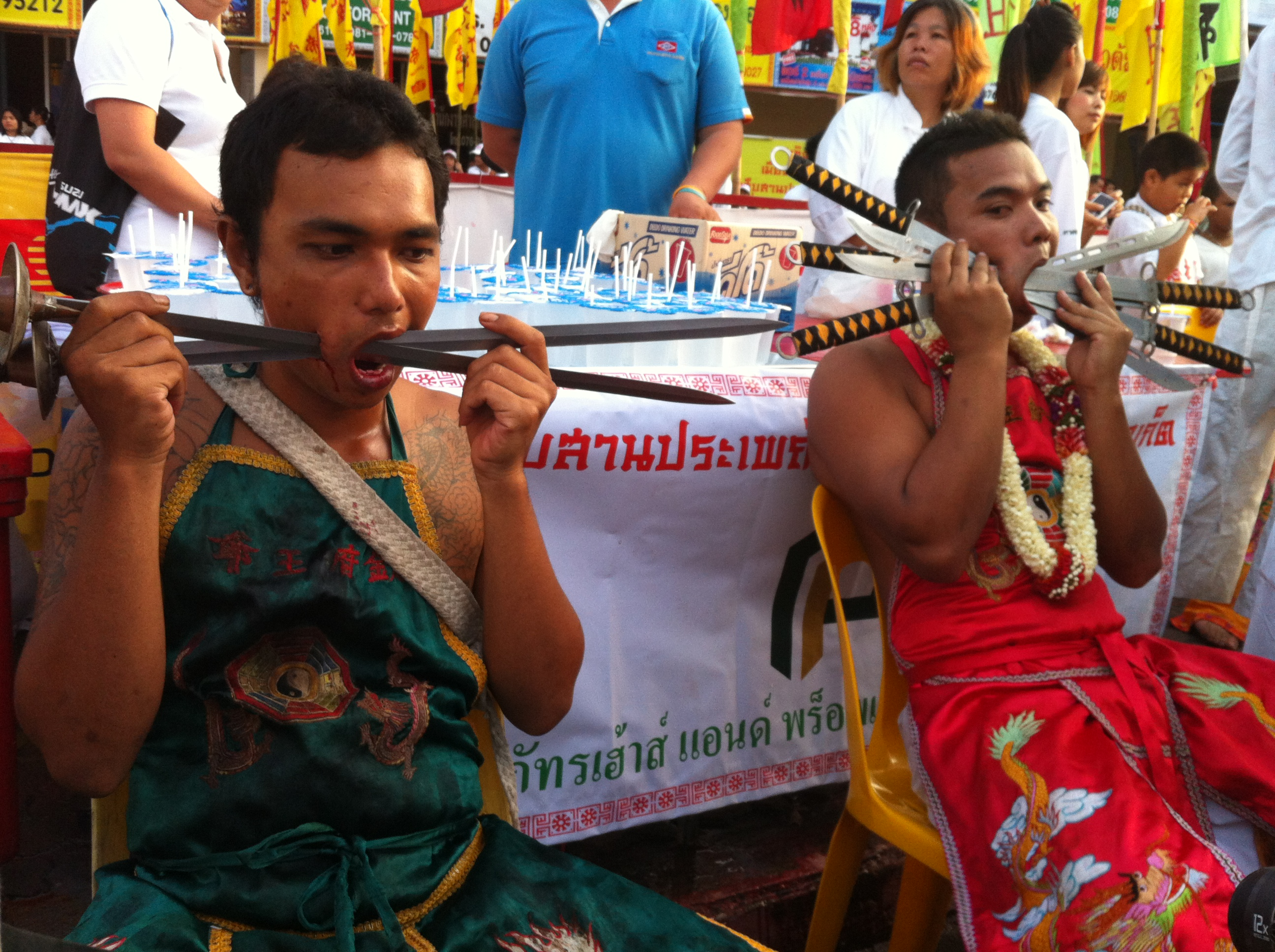

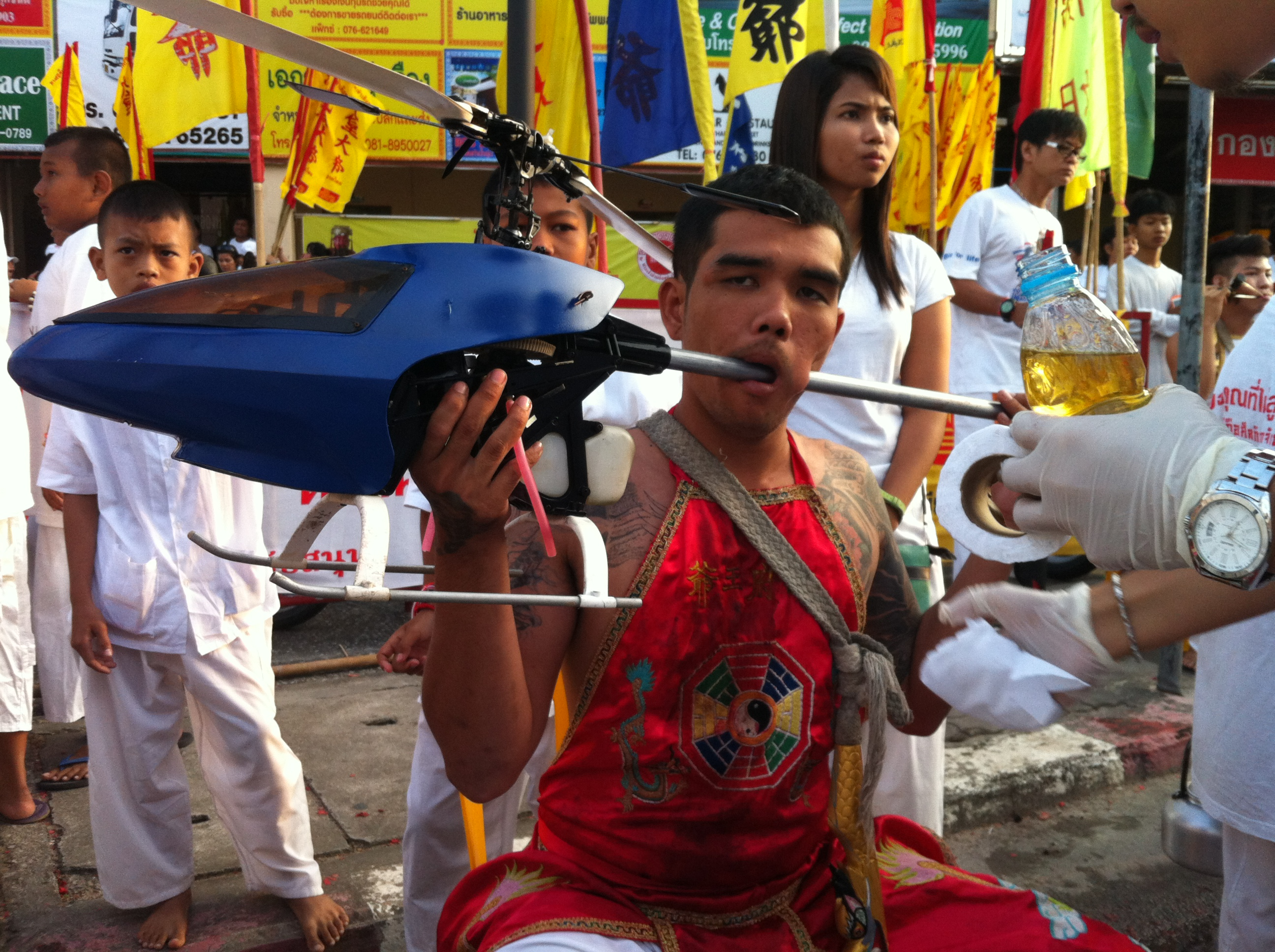

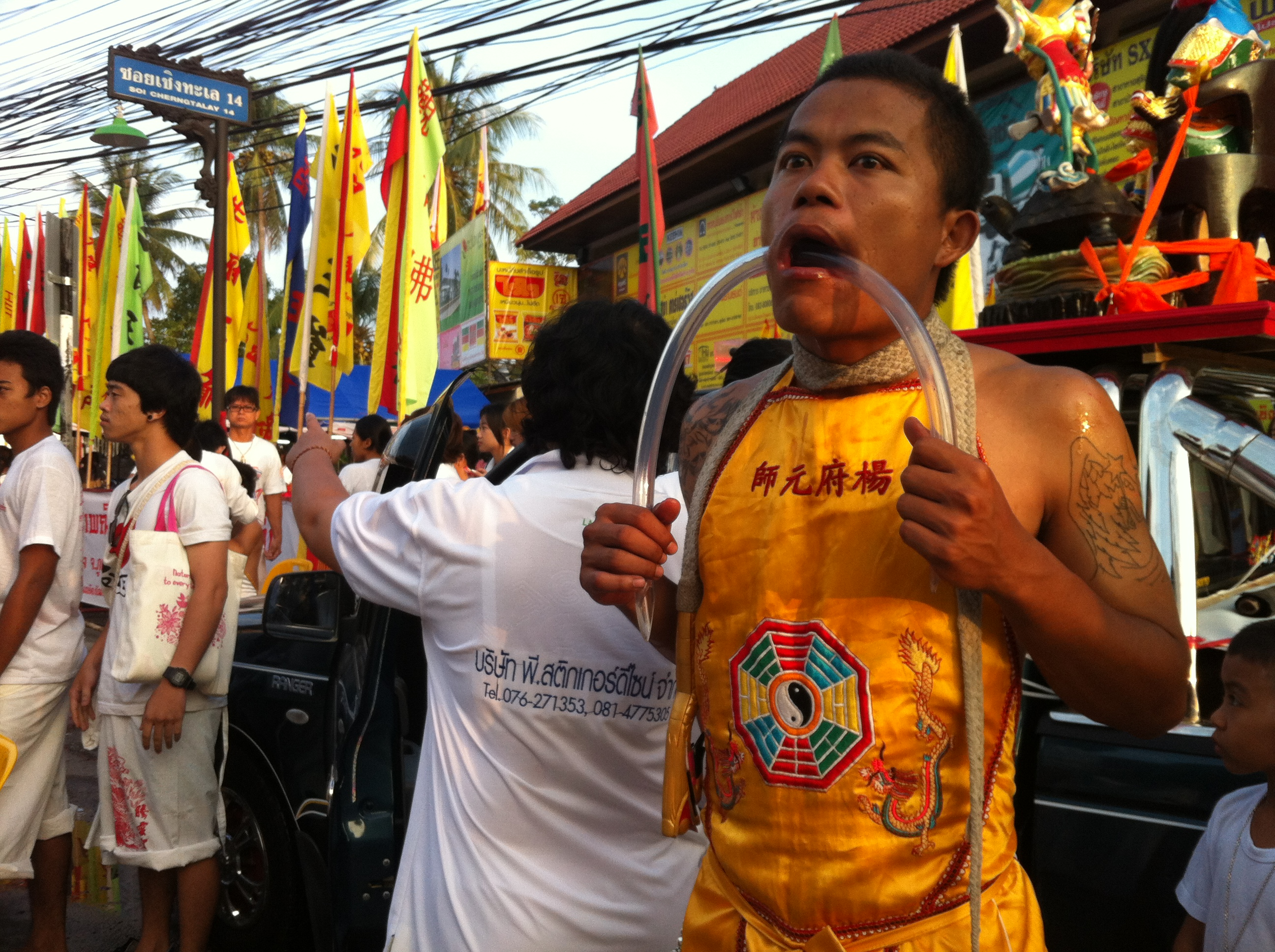

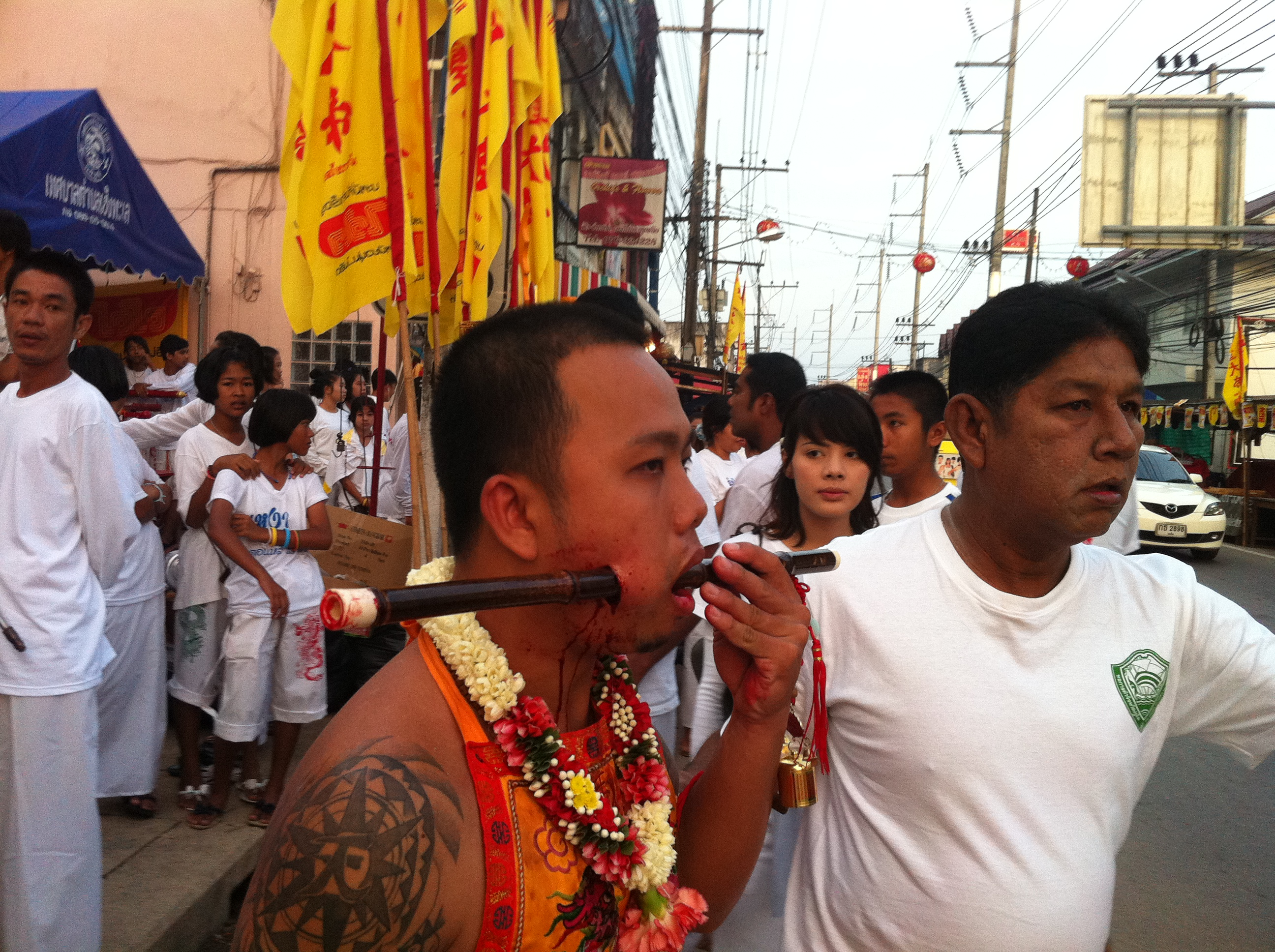

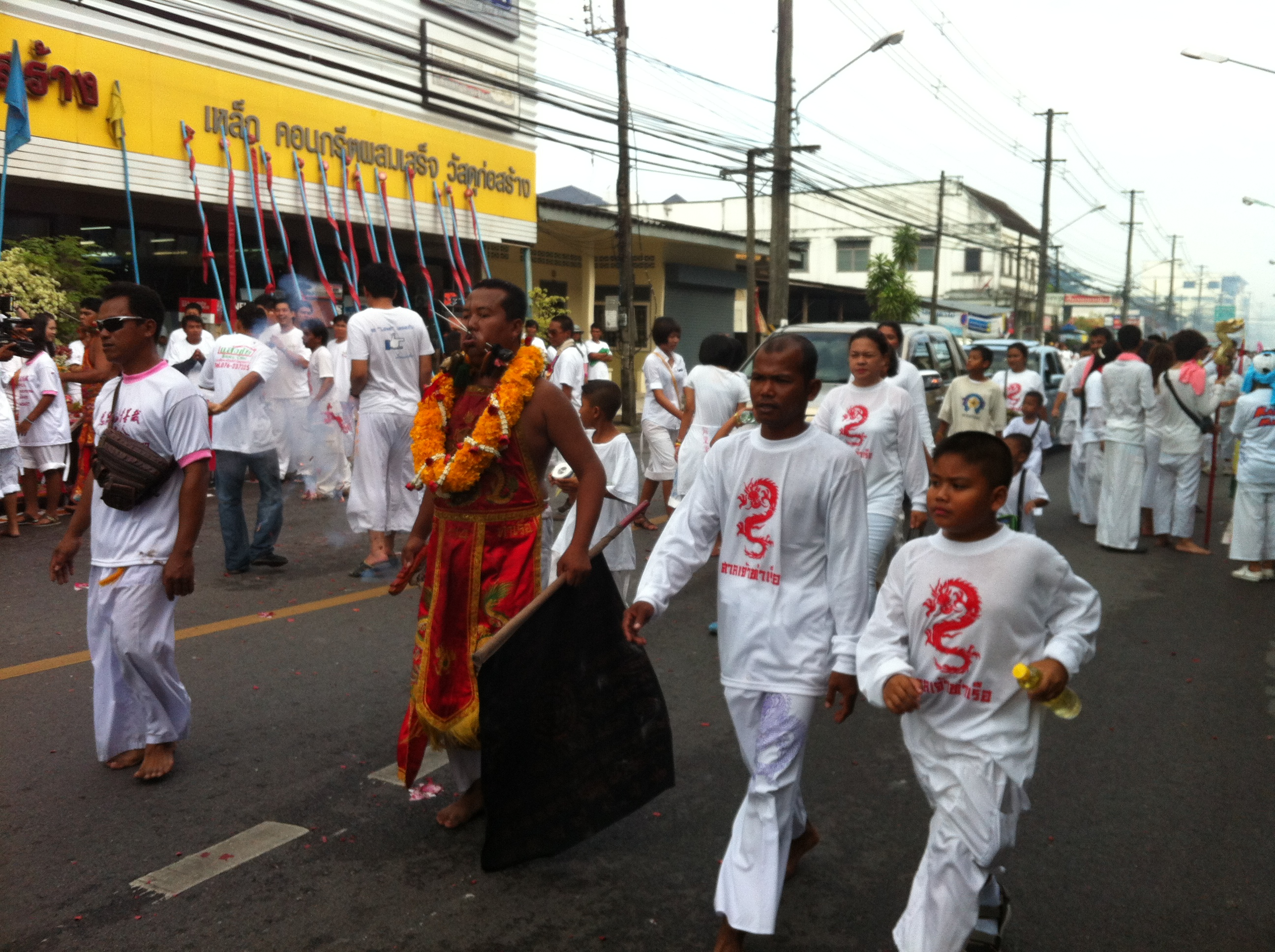
Parades usually start at 9 minutes past the hour, disrupting traffic during morning rush hours. The procession walks from an ahm to Phuket town.

== See also ==
- Doumu (斗母元君)
- Tou Mu Kung Temple, Singapore
- Chinese folk religion in Southeast Asia
- Wang Ye worship
- Birthday of the Monkey God
- Monkey King Festival
- Zhong Yuan Festival
- List of vegetarian festivals
- Tow Boh Keong Temple, Ipoh

== Notes ==
- Cohen, Eric; The Chinese Vegetarian Festival in Phuket Bangkok; White Lotus, 2001, ISBN 974-7534-89-4

== News articles ==
- "NTU team to study popular Taoist festival of the Nine Emperor Gods". The Straits Times (online). 2016-10-01.
- "Nine Emperor Gods Festival celebrated with many people of all races and religions". The Straits Times (online). 2016-10-09.
