= Doumu =

Goddess in Chinese religion and Taoism

- Goddess of Heaven
- Member of Ursa Major deities
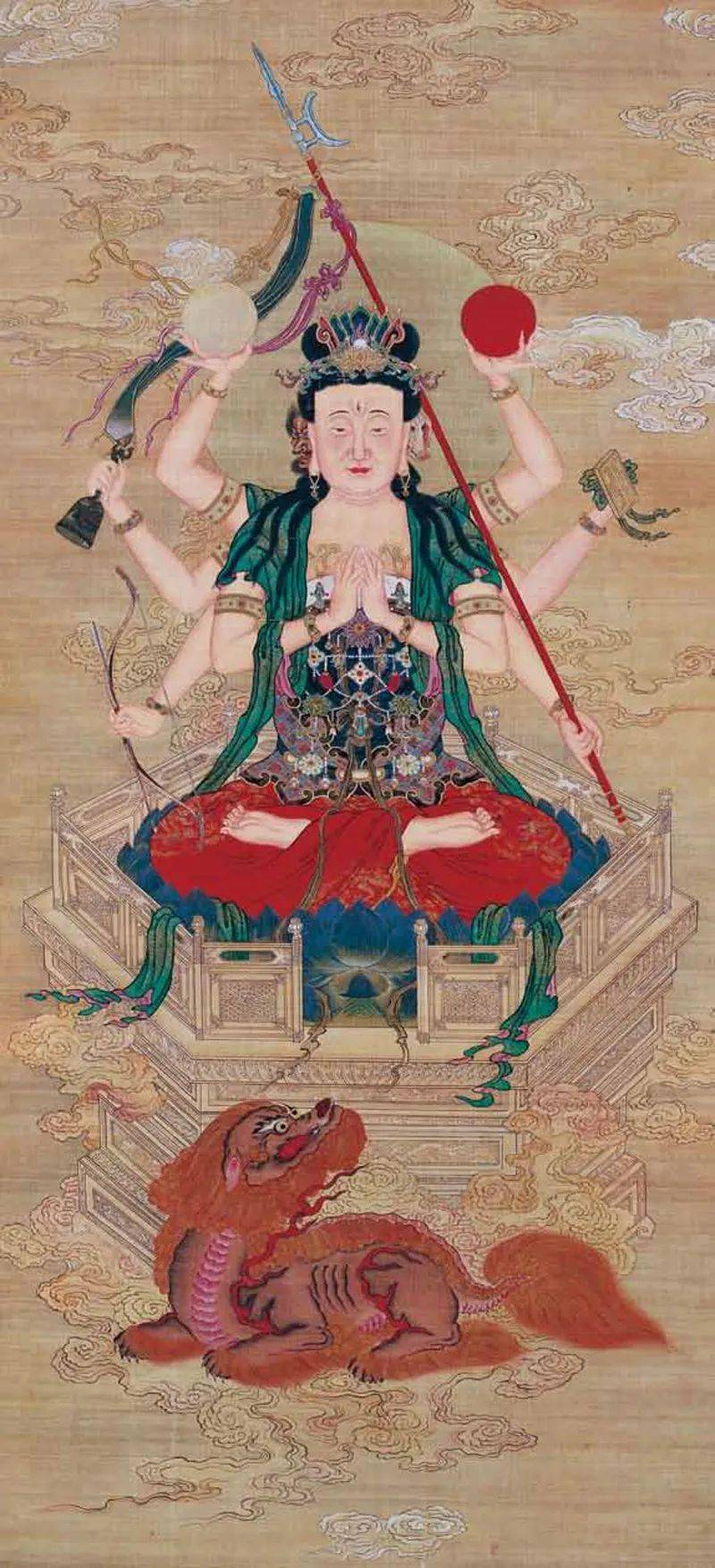
- Other names: Lady Mother of the Chariot; Mother of the Big Dipper
- Weapon: Bow and arrow Spear
- Animals: Boar
- Symbols: Golden seal Bell
- Gender: Female

Genealogy
- Children: Tianhuang Emperor; Ziwei Emperor

Equivalents
- Buddhist: Marici

Dǒumǔ (Chinese: 斗母; lit. 'Mother of the Great Chariot / Big Dipper'), also known as Dǒumǔ Yuánjūn (斗母元君; "Lady Mother of the Chariot"), Dòulǎo Yuánjūn (斗姥元君; "Lady Ancestress of the Chariot") and Tàiyī Yuánjūn (太一元君; "Lady of the Great One"), is a goddess in Chinese folk religion and Taoism. She is also named through the honorific Tiānhòu (天后 "Queen of Heaven"), shared with other Chinese goddesses, especially Mazu, who are perhaps conceived as her aspects. Other names are Dàomǔ (道母; "Mother of the Way") and Tiānmǔ (天母; "Mother of Heaven").

She is the feminine aspect of the cosmic God of Heaven. The seven stars of the Big Dipper, in addition to two not visible to the naked eye, are conceived as her sons, the Jiǔhuángshén (九皇神; "Nine God-Kings"), themselves regarded as the ninefold manifestation of Jiǔhuángdàdì (九皇大帝; "Great Deity of the Nine Kings") or Dòufù (斗父; "Father of the Great Chariot"), another name of the God of Heaven. She is therefore both wife and mother of the God of Heaven. In certain Taoist accounts she is identified as the ambiguous goddess of life and death Xiwangmu.

== In religious doctrines ==
=== Taoist esotericism ===
In the esoteric teachings of Taoism she is identified as the same as Jinling Shengmu, Jiutian Xuannü (九天玄女; "Mysterious Lady of the Nine Heavens") and Xiwangmu (西王母; "Queen Mother of the West"), representing the mother of the immortal "red infant" (赤子; chìzǐ) Dao enshrined at the centre of the human body. This links her directly to the myths about the birth and initiation of Laozi and the Yellow Emperor (whose mother Fubao became pregnant with him after she was aroused by seeing lightning emanating from, or turning around, the Big Dipper), as attested, among others, by Ge Hong (283-343).

=== Buddhist interpretation ===
In Vajrayana traditions of Chinese Buddhism (Tangmi), Doumu was conflated with Bodhisattva Marici at least by the Tang dynasty. Marici too is described as the mother of the Way and the Dipper, at the centre of Brahma's Heaven of primal energy. Marici's chariot is pulled by seven boars. Furthermore she has also been associated and linked with Cundi. The incantation used in the Taoist scripture dedicated to Doumu is the same as one of the longer Buddhist dharanis used for Marici, but with eight verses in Han Chinese added in the beginning to praise her.

== Artistic depictions ==
Doumu in art

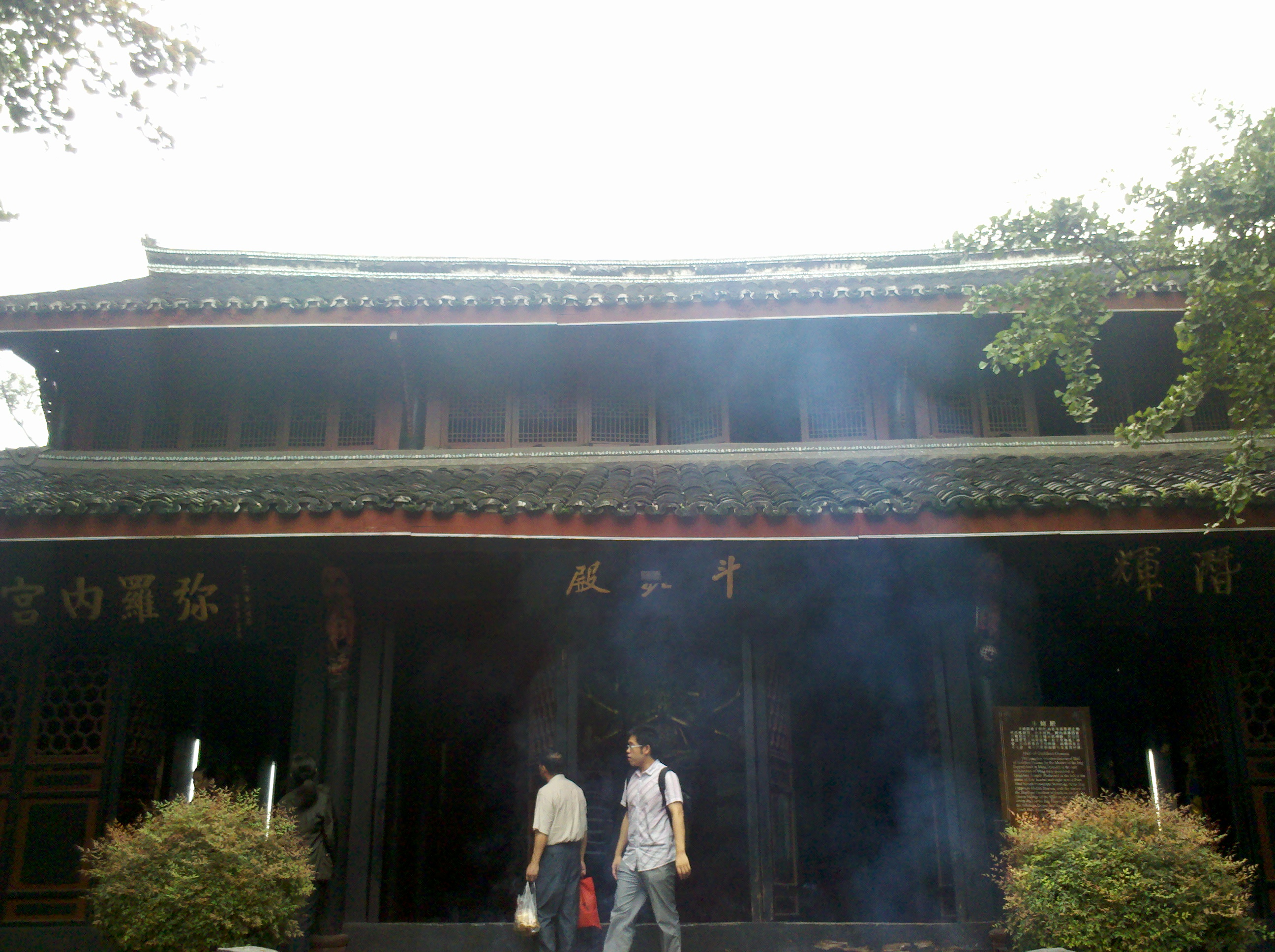
Hall of Doumu at the Green Ram Temple in Chengdu, Sichuan, China

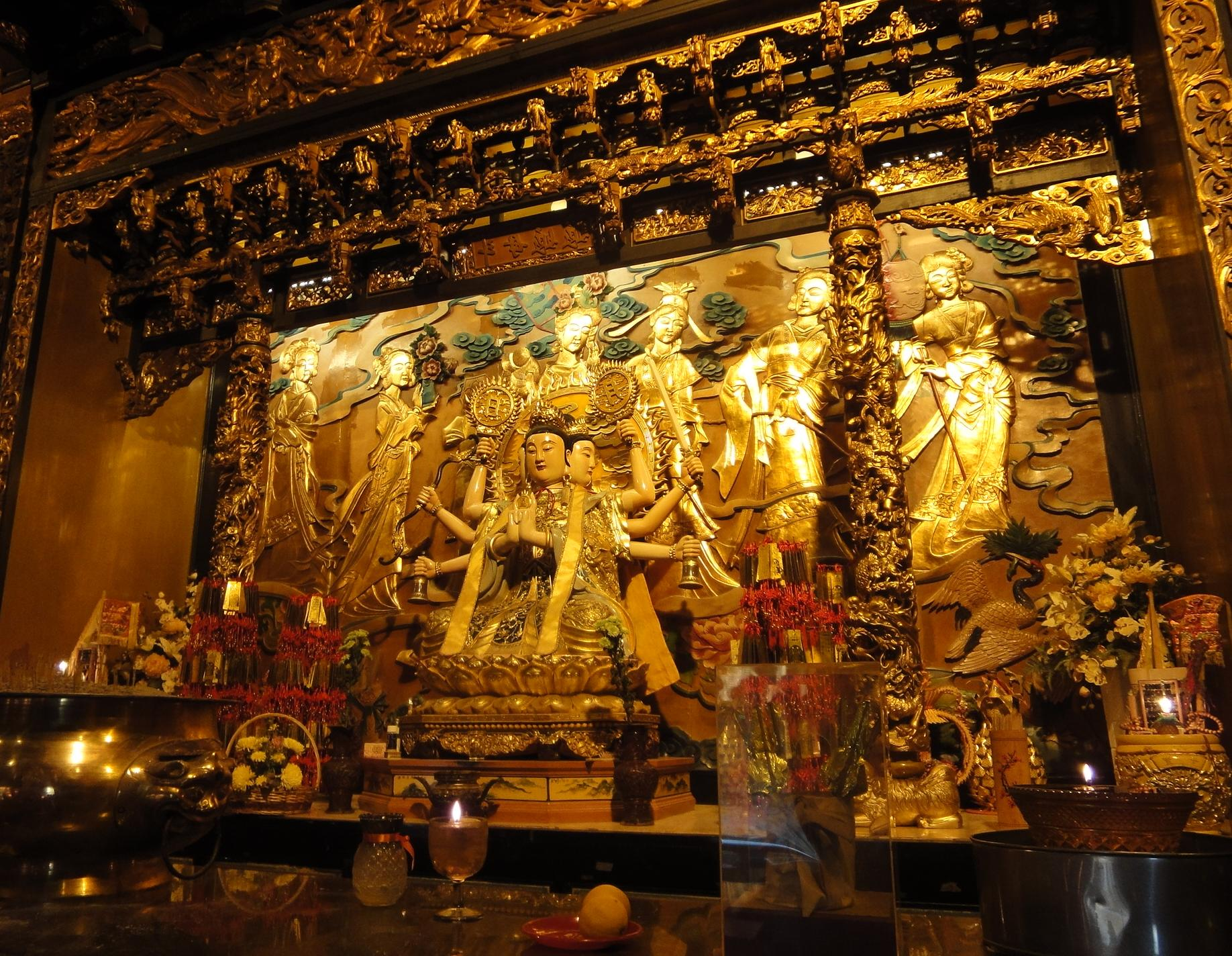
Doumu altar at a temple in Butterworth, Penang, Malaysia

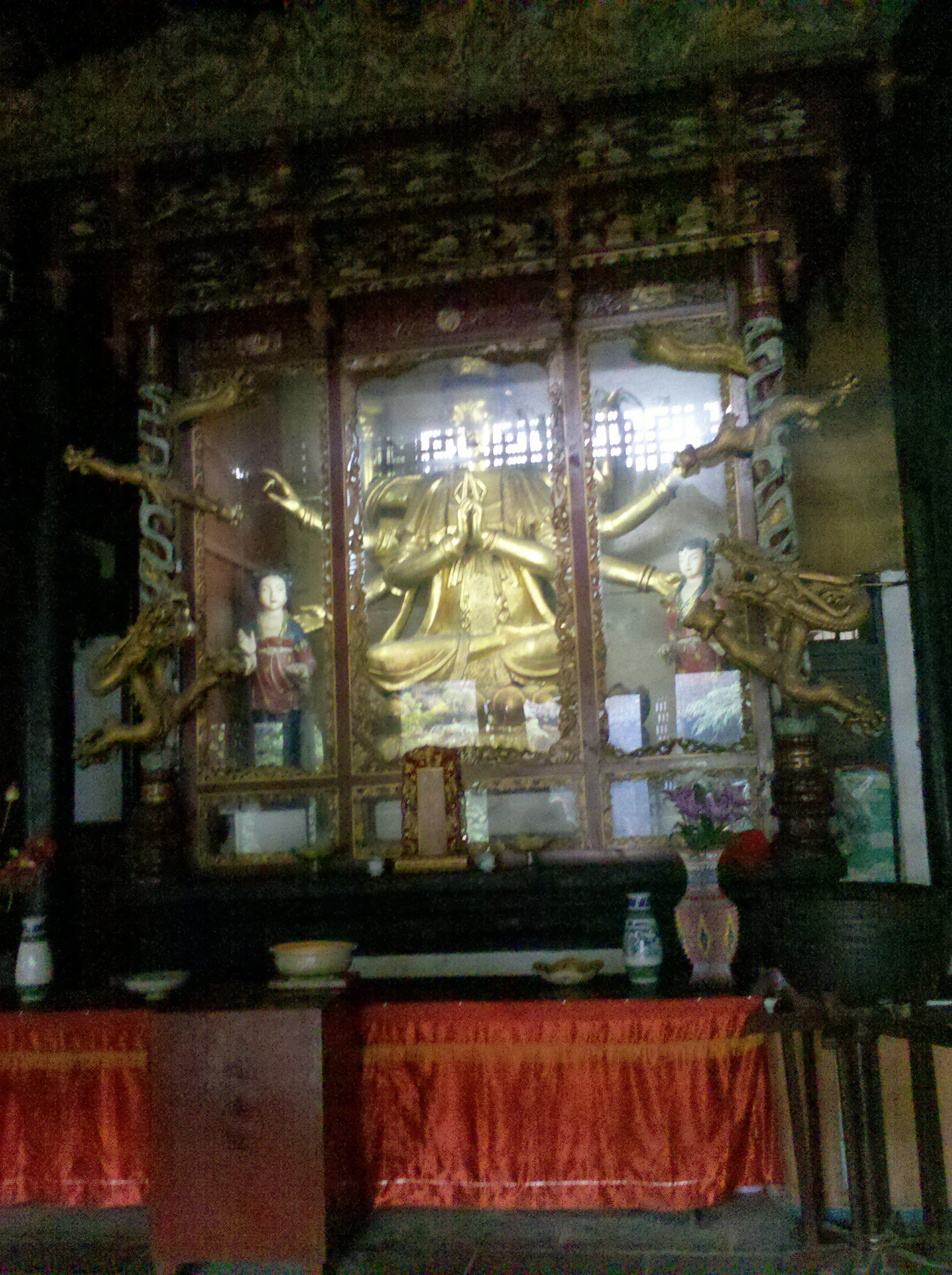
Statue of Doumu at the Green Ram Temple

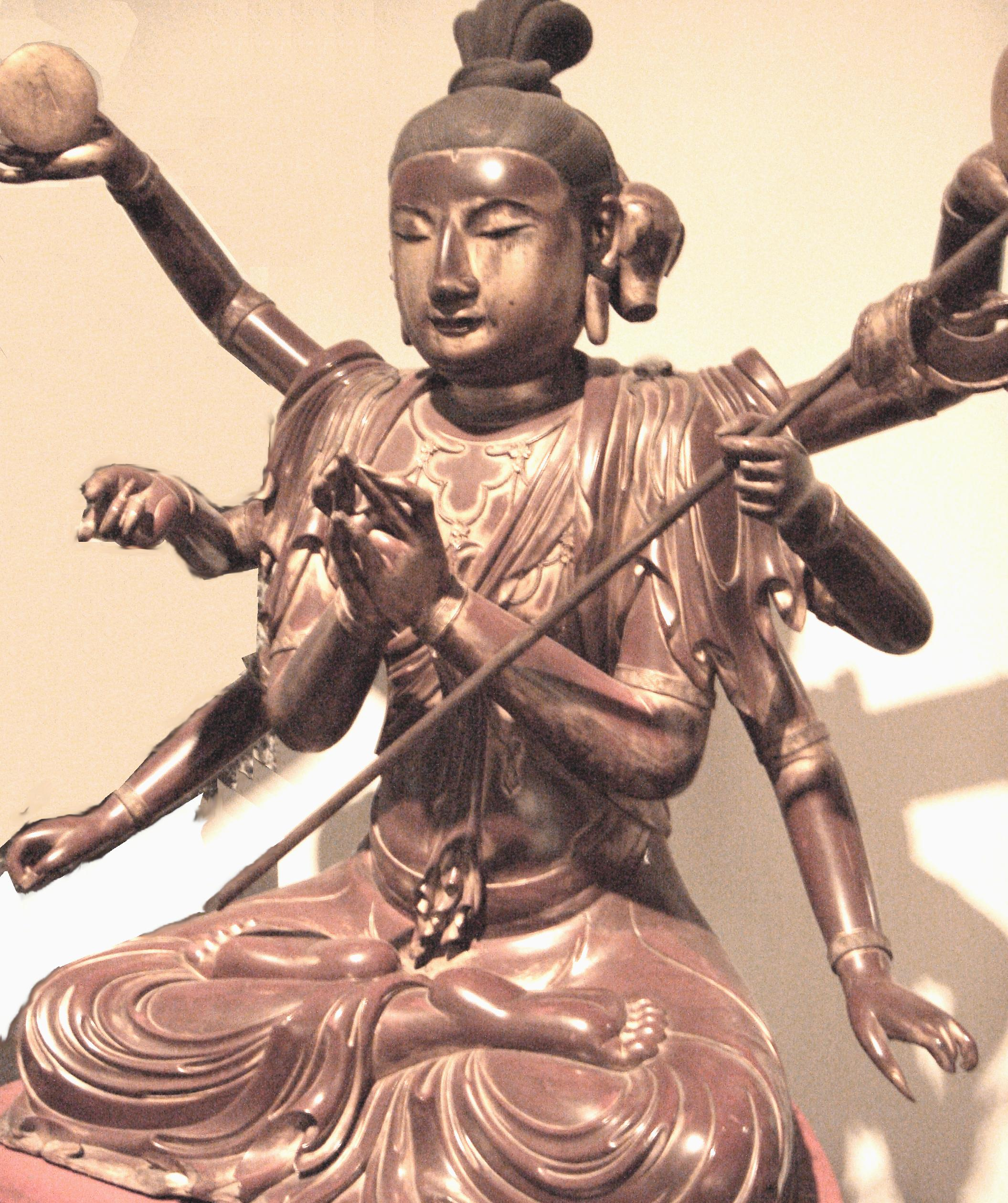
Song dynasty statue of Doumu

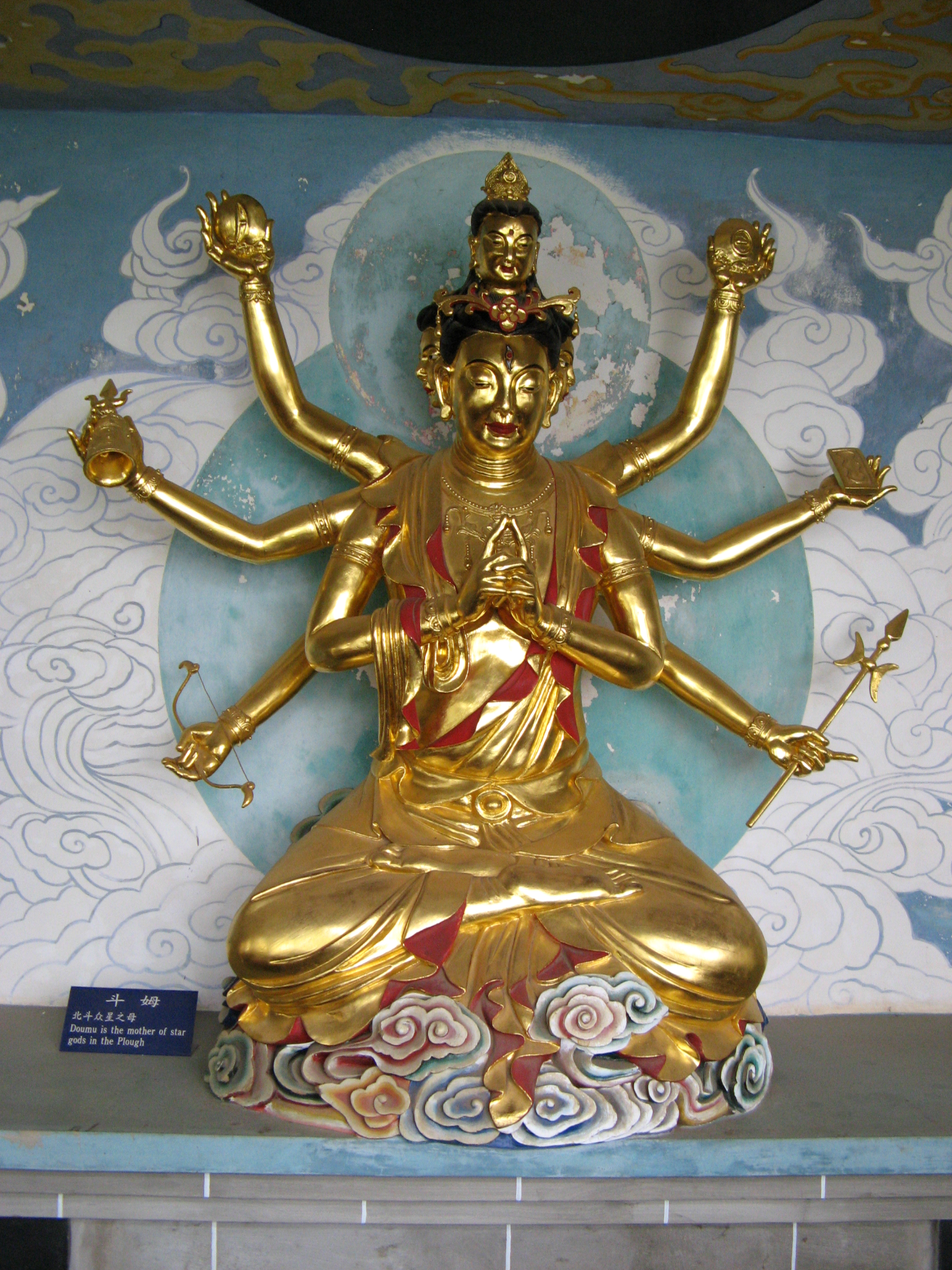
Statue of Doumu in Kunming, China

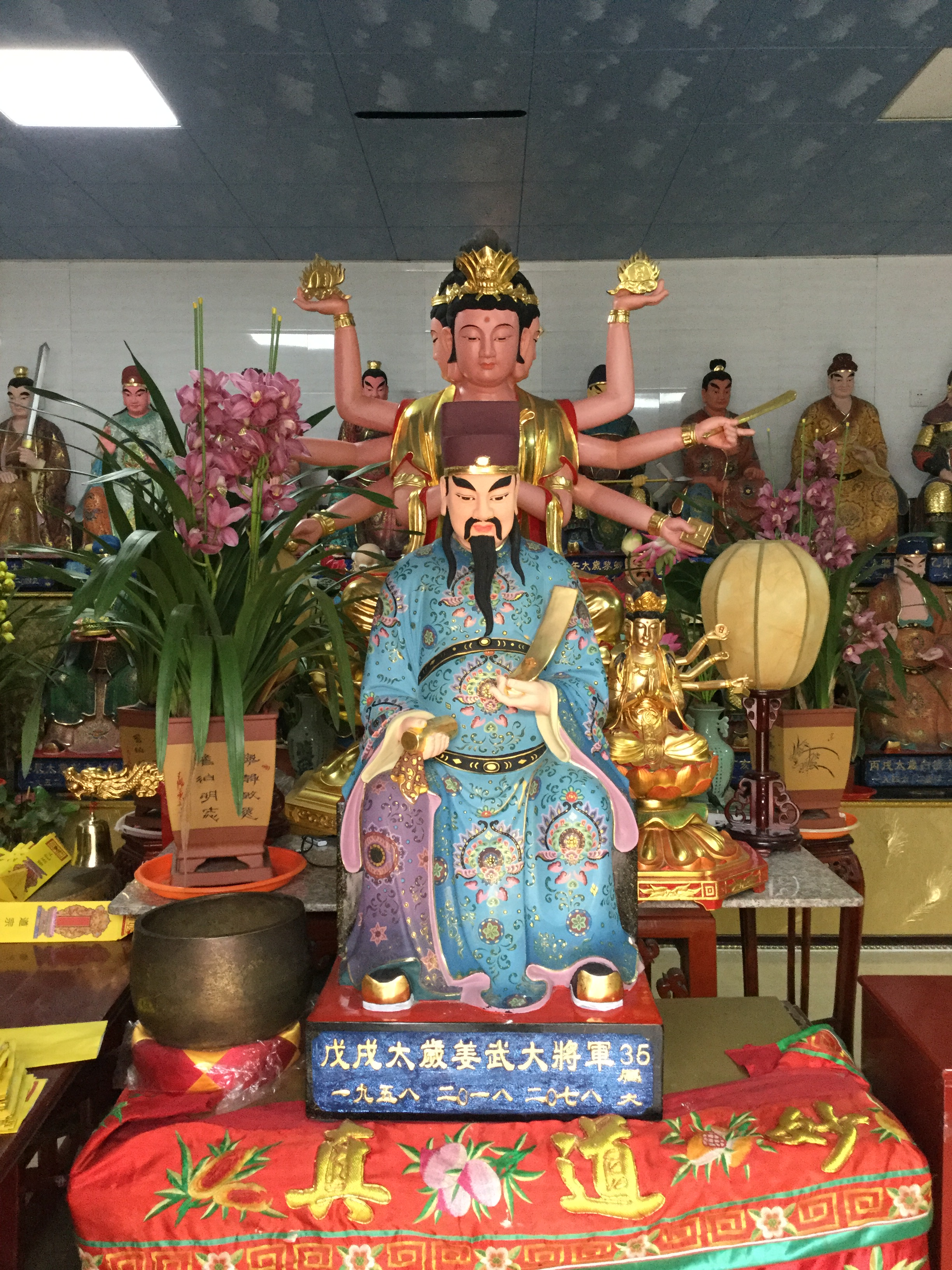
Doumu behind another god at Huayang Taoist Temple in Jieyang, Guangdong, China

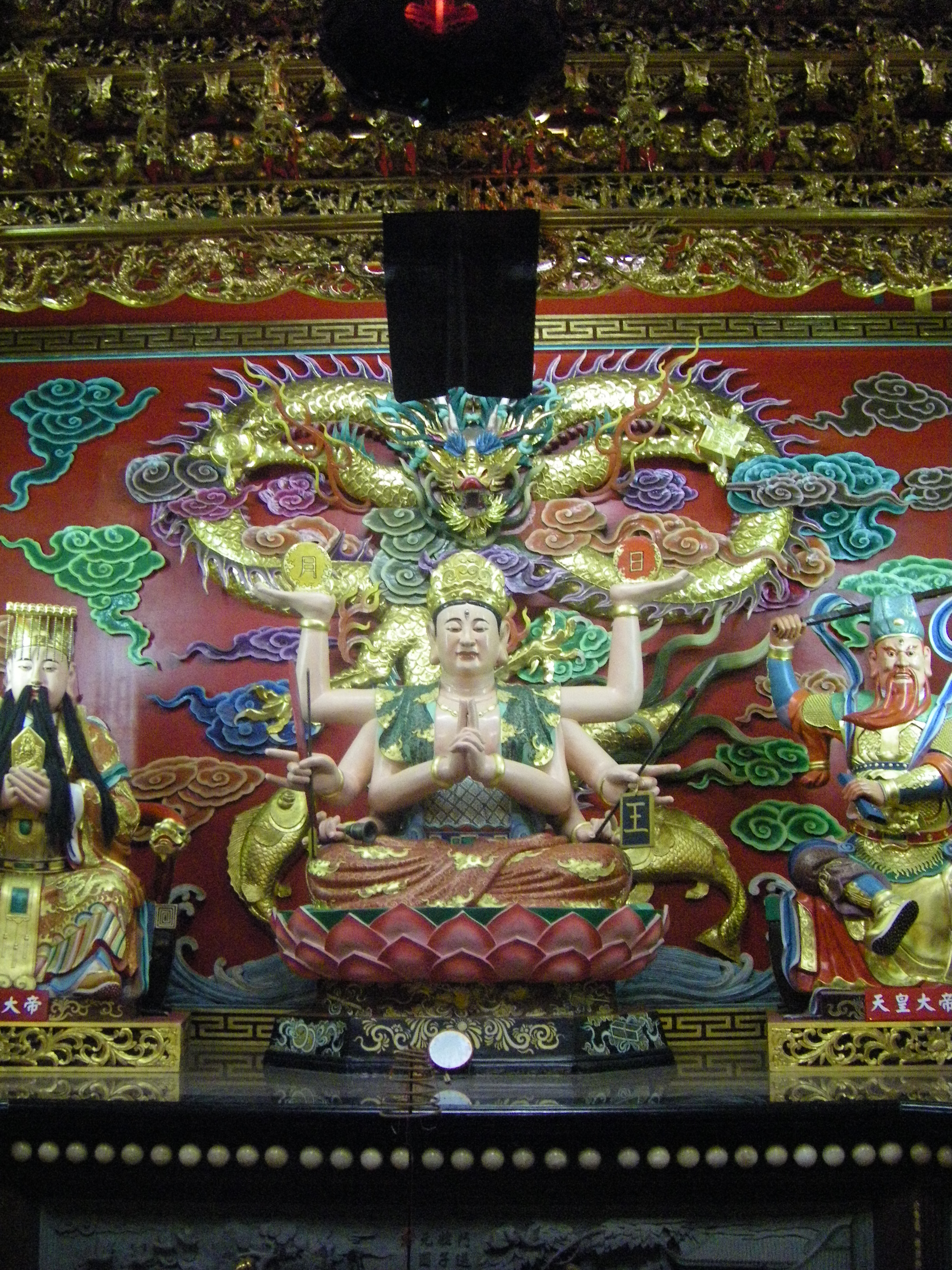
Statue of Doumu in Taiwan

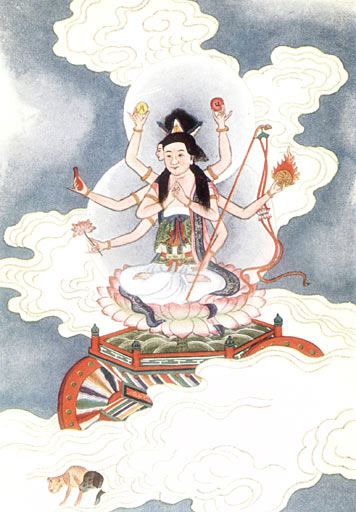
Illustration of Doumu (1922)

Statue of Doumu at Tow Boh Keong temple in Ipoh, Perak, Malaysia

== See also ==
- Tai Sui
- Nine Emperor Gods Festival
- Chinese theology
- Big Dipper

Other goddesses identified with the Great Chariot

- Ungnyeo
- Ninlil
- Ninhursag
