= Goddess Golden Flower =

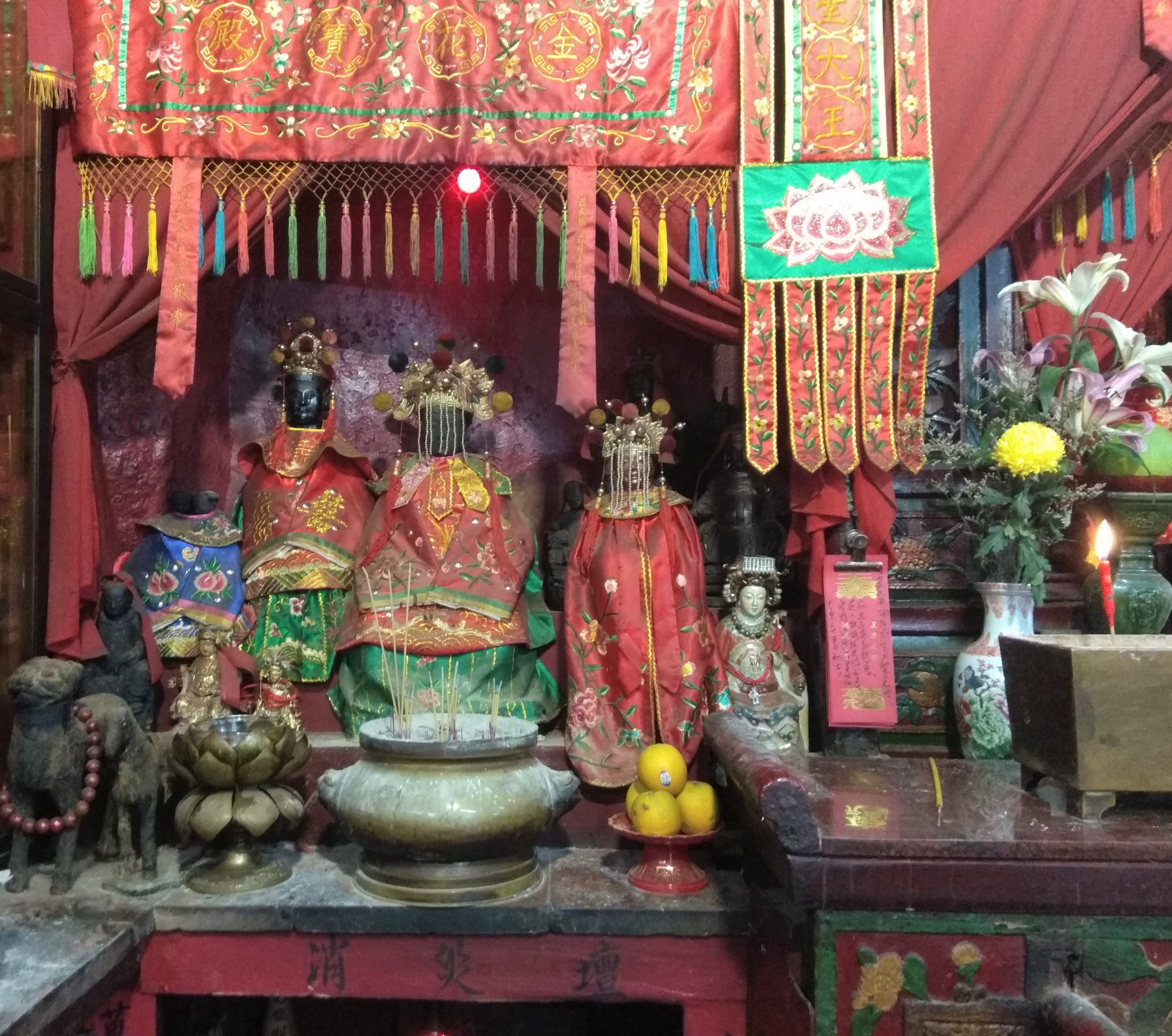
- Statue of Goddess Golden Flower in Hung Shing Temple,Wan Chai, Hong Kong
- Chinese: 金花娘娘
Transcriptions
Yue: Cantonese
- Yale Romanization: Kam Fa Neung Neung
- Jyutping: Kam^{1} fa^{1} Leung^{4} Leung^{4}

Goddess Golden Flower (金花聖母), also known as Kam Fa Neung Neung (金花娘娘), is a prominent folk deity in southern Chinese religious tradition, especially in Guangdong, Guangxi, and Hong Kong. She is widely honored as a protector of fertility, childbirth, and young children, and her cult remains deeply rooted in Cantonese-speaking communities.

The preparatory ceremony will be held on the 16th day of the fourth lunar month, during which temple officials will perform rituals to appease the spirits of the underworld. They will burn paper offerings (money, clothing, and food) in four locations on the temple and island to pray for peace.

== Origins and identity ==
Although her story varies across regions, she is most commonly linked to a virtuous young woman from the Ming dynasty. Over time, several distinct traditions have shaped her identity:

=== The Shamaness of Guangzhou (女巫傳說) ===
Guangdong Xinyu (廣東新語) by Wat Daai Gwan (屈大均) records that Golden Flower was a Guangdong shamaness who never married and was able to serve and communicate with spirits. She drowned while still young, yet her body remained uncorrupted for several days and even emitted a strange fragrance. Soon afterward, a wooden statue bearing her likeness floated up from the lake. Local people began to venerate the statue, and Golden Flower herself came to be regarded as a deity. Because prayers to her for children were considered especially effective, she was honored as a goddess who grants offspring.

=== The Gifted Midwife (助產傳說) ===
Another tradition portrays her as a mortal woman renowned for her exceptional midwifery skills. After successfully assisting the wife of a high-ranking official through a dangerous labor, she was elevated to divine status as a guardian of expectant mothers.

=== The Martial Daughter (武女傳說) ===
A separate legend from the Tang dynasty describes her as the daughter of a general, accomplished in both martial arts and literature. She later withdrew from worldly life and attained immortality.

== Divine roles and powers ==
Devotees turn to Goddess Golden Flower for blessings related to family, childbirth, and protection. Her principal functions include:

=== Fertility and Conception ===
Women seeking children pray to her for the blessing of fertility and the “gift of sons.”

=== Safe Childbirth ===
She is believed to safeguard mothers and infants during labor, ensuring a smooth and safe delivery.

=== Protection of Infants and Children ===
Families often bring newborns to her temples to express gratitude and request ongoing protection for the child's health.

=== Dispelling Illness and Plagues ===
In some traditions, she is credited with the power to ward off epidemics and harmful spirits.

== Worship and festivals ==
Her worship is especially strong among Cantonese communities in Hong Kong, South China and Southeast Asia, where she is honored through vibrant festivals and temple traditions.

=== Kam Fa Dan (金花誕) ===
Goddess Golden Flower Festival (Kam Fa Dan) — Celebrated on the 17th day of the 4th lunar month, this festival features lion dances, Cantonese opera performances, and offerings made by families seeking her blessings. The primary location for this celebration in Hong Kong is the Kam Fa Temple on Peng Chau Island, where the goddess is the principal deity. The preparatory ceremony is held on the 16th, during which temple officials perform rituals to appease the spirits of the underworld. They burn paper offerings (money, clothing, and food) in four locations on the temple and island to pray for peace. The main celebrations take place on the 17th. Lion and dragon dance are performed. More than ten lions and a golden dragon put up a "wishing" performance. The highlight is the "eye-dotting" (點睛) ceremony, presided over by local officials. The aim of which is to "wake up" the lions. A community banquet follows - a vegetarian lunch prepared for seniors in the community, followed by a game of raffle and the giving out of "healthy rice packs" (平安米), cookies, and gifts as good wishes.

=== Personal Worship ===
Devotees visit throughout the year, especially on the 1st and 15th of every lunar month, to seek blessings for family harmony or children. Standard offerings include incense, paper clothing, fresh flowers, and food. Burning elaborate "Kam Fa clothes" and spirit money is a primary act of devotion. Believers also offer roasted pigs, fruits, tea, and fresh flowers. For believers who long for children, pray for "the gift of sons" or grandchildren. When their wishes are fulfilled, they expressed their gratitude by returning thanks (Huan Yuan, 還願). Mothers will bring their babies to worship when they are one month old and on their first birthday, to thank the goddess for protecting them during childbirth. Besides praying for a smooth pregnancy, a safe delivery, and a healthy child, people also believe it is very effective for praying for marriage and love.
