= Poh San Teng Temple =

Temple in Melaka City, Melaka, Malaysia

- Malay: Tokong Poh San Teng; Chinese: 宝山亭
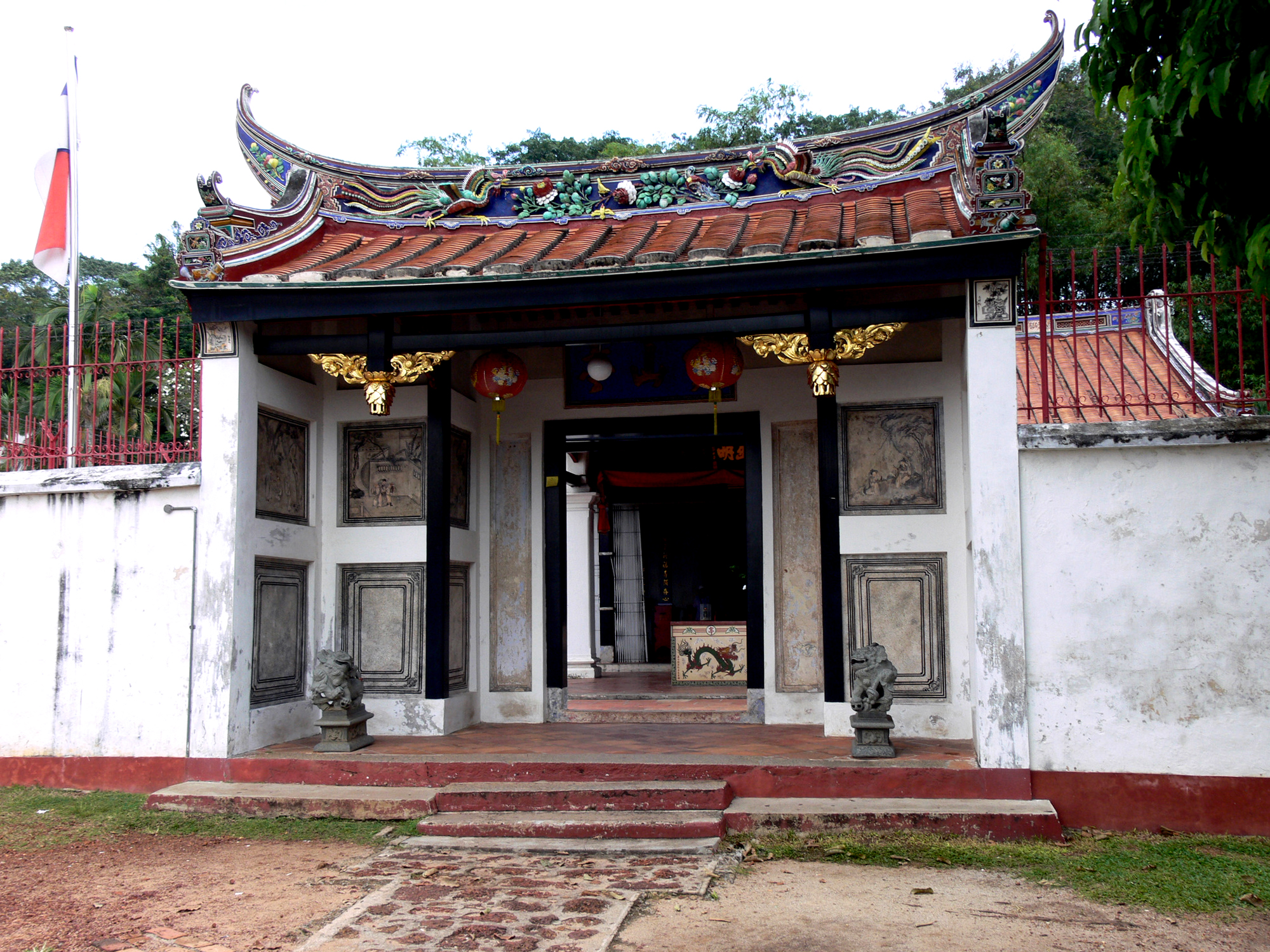

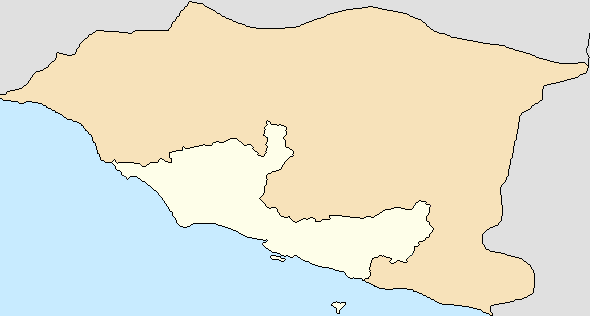
- Location within Malacca City

Religion
- Affiliation: Taoism

Location
- Location: Melaka City, Melaka, Malaysia
- Interactive map of Poh San Teng Temple
- Coordinates: 2°11′45.5″N 102°15′19.9″E

Architecture
- Type: Chinese temple
- Founder: Chua Su Cheong (Tsai Shih-chang)
- Established: 1795

The Poh San Teng Temple (Chinese: 宝山亭; pinyin: Bǎo Shān Tíng is a Chinese temple located at the foot of Bukit China, next to the Malacca Warrior Monument and King's Well in Malacca City, Malacca, Malaysia. The temple is dedicated to Tua Pek Kong and was founded in 1795 during the era of Dutch Malacca by Chinese Kapitan Chua Su Cheong (Tsai Shih-chang).

== Features ==
Since it is a graveyard temple, the names of the deity, "Fu De Zheng Shen" or "Tua Pek Kong" are inscribed, and the temple is mainly dedicated to Tua Pek Kong. An inscription on a stele in the temple compound commemorating the founding of the temple reads:

Bukit Cina is the place where early traders from China were buried. Many Chinese traders came to this country with high expectations of success. Sadly, some died before fulfilling their dreams. Without a family with them, there was no one to pray for their souls. As such, the Chinese Kapitans initiated prayers on their behalf. However, these were always hampered by strong winds and heavy rainfalls because there was no proper shelter. So in 1795, after Chua Su Cheong had been appointed the Chinese Kapitan, he looked into this problem faced by the community and initiated the building of a temple at the foot of Bukit Cina, to ensure that the prayers for those buried in Bukit Cina would not be interrupted.

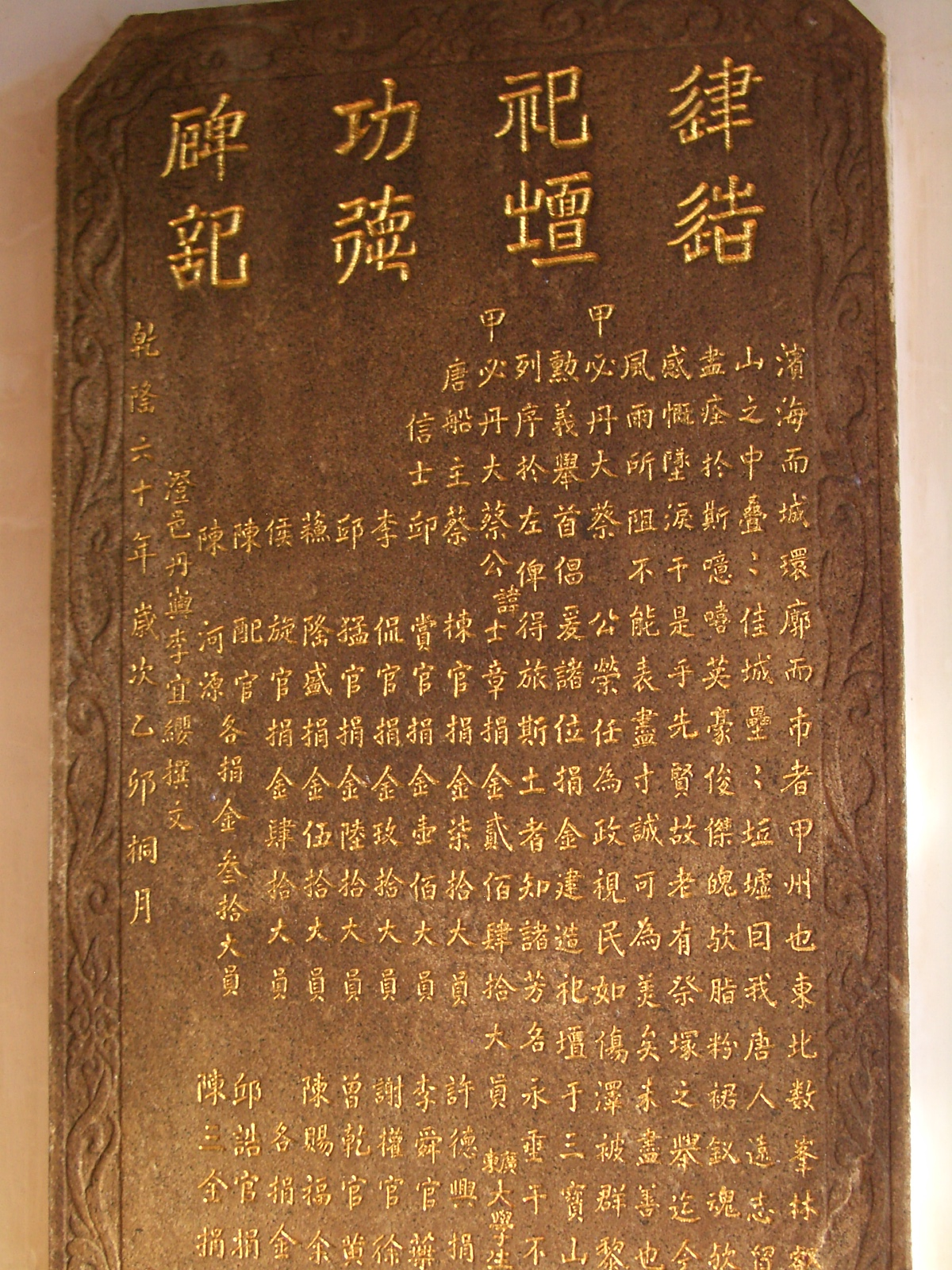
A stele with Chinese characters inside the temple.

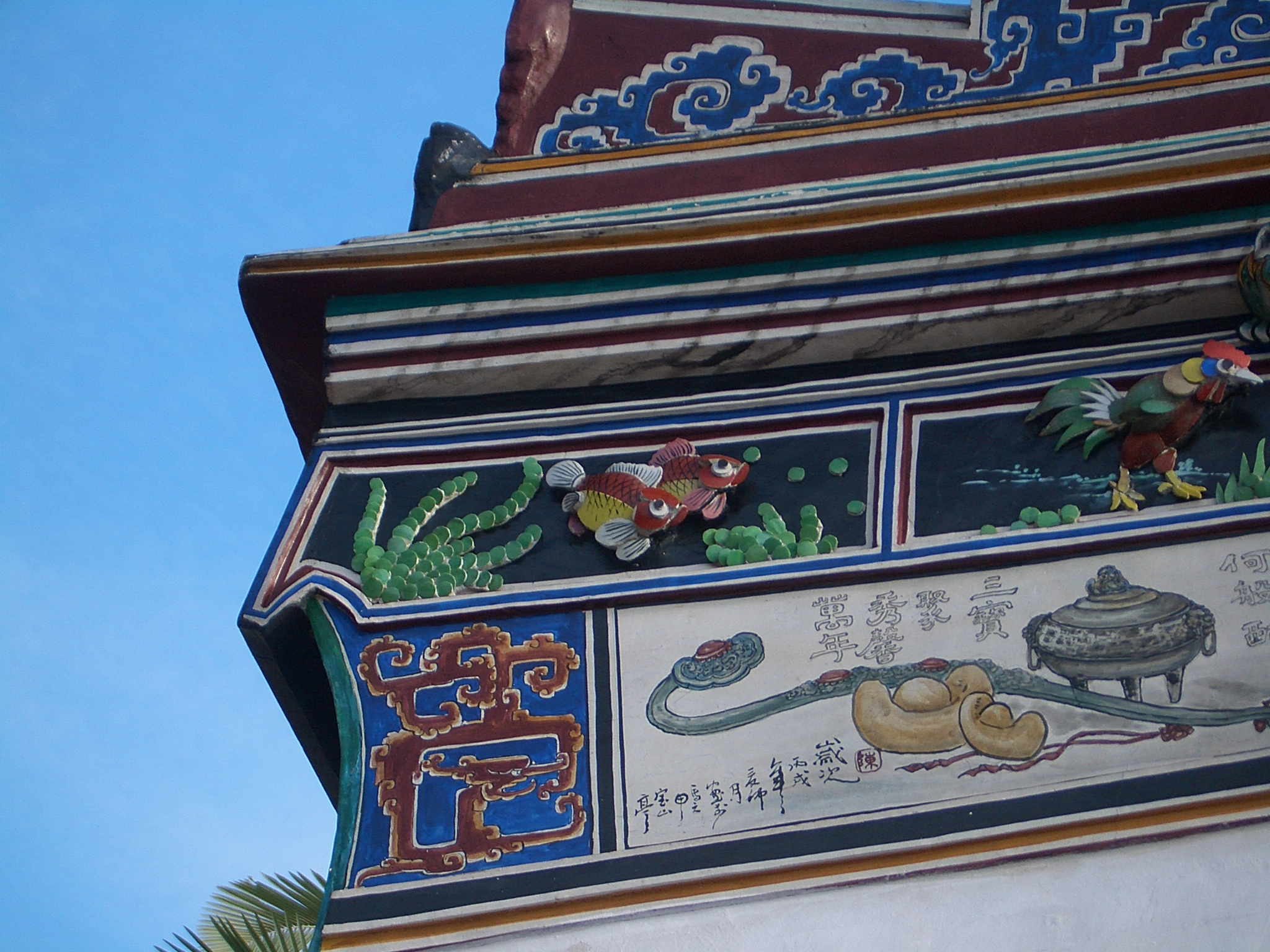
Roofing art with the painting of censer, sycee and ruyi.

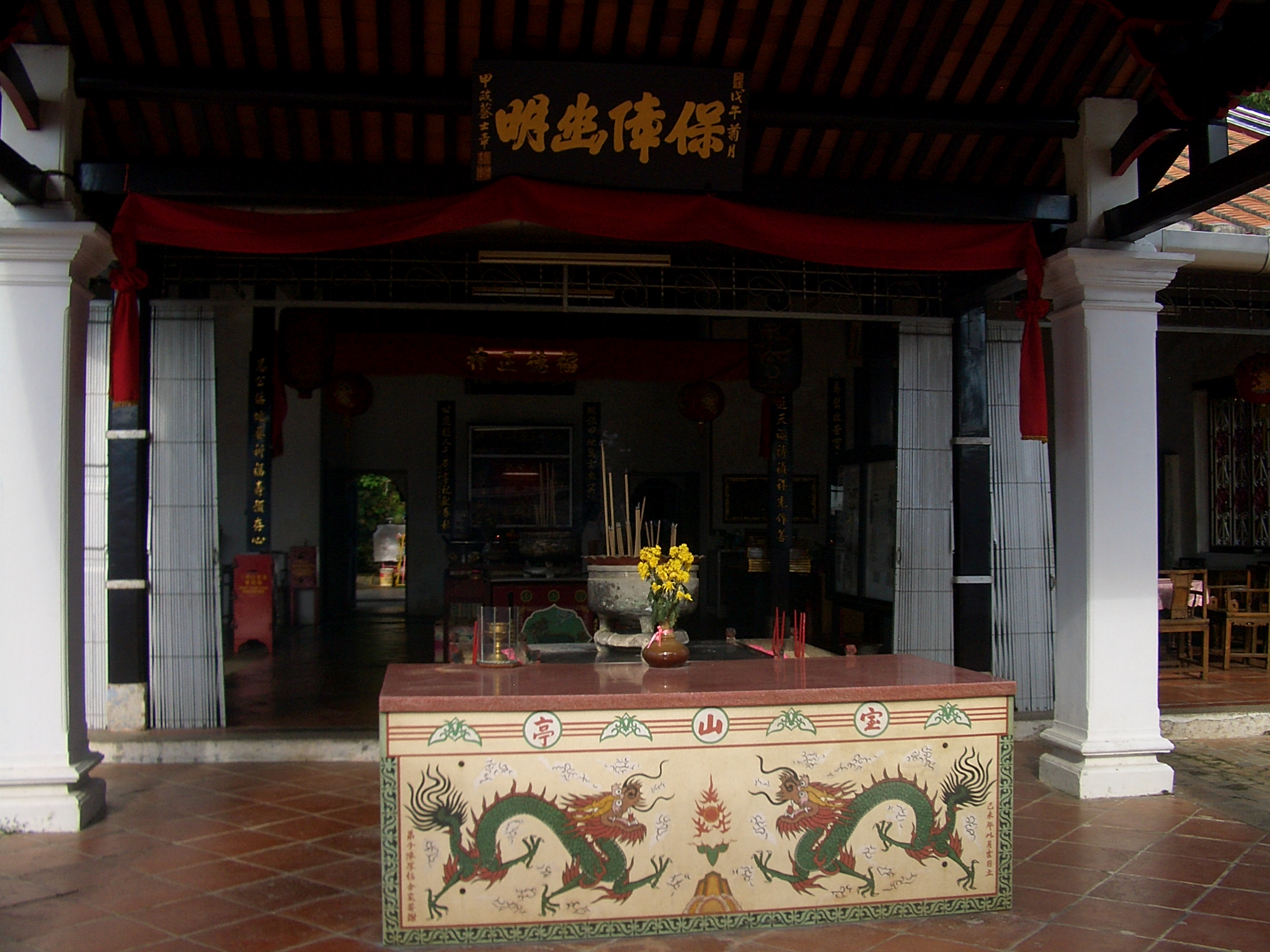
The temple interior.

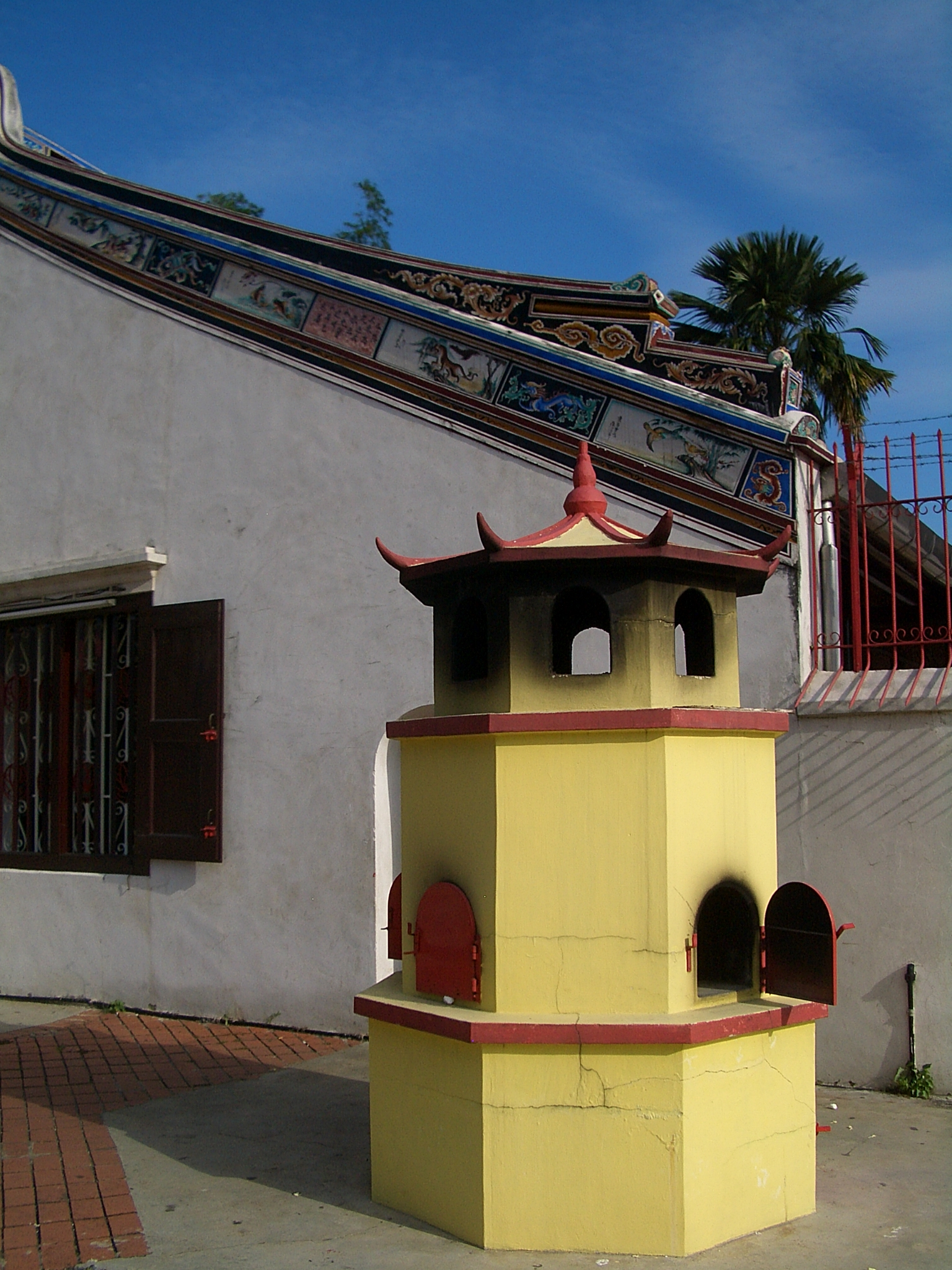
Temple furnace.

== See also ==
- Cheng Hoon Teng Temple
- Xiang Lin Si Temple
- List of tourist attractions in Malacca
