= Tua Pek Kong =

Pantheon

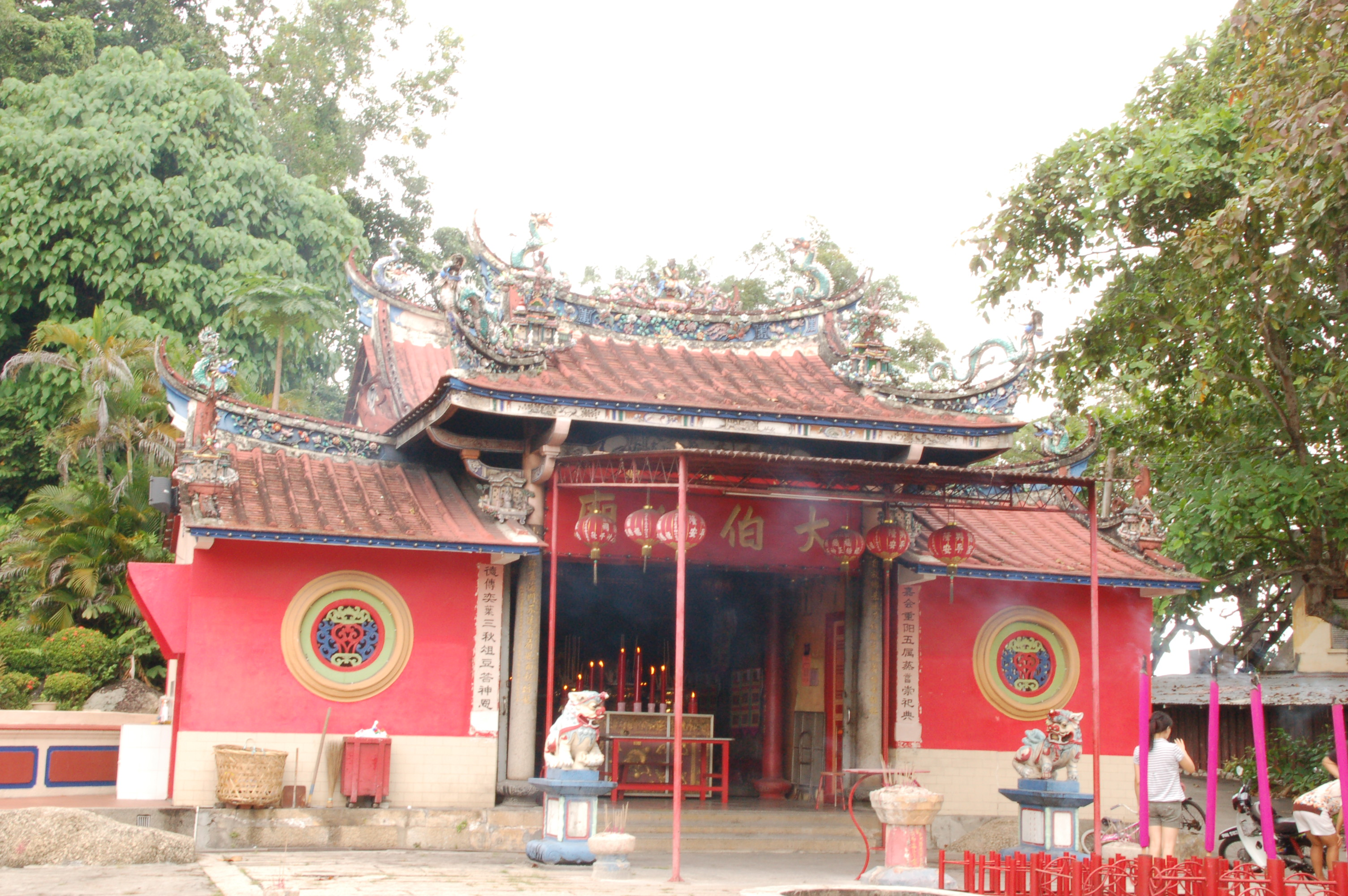
- The oldest Tua Pek Kong Temple, located in Tanjung Tokong, Penang, Malaysia, from which worship of Tua Pek Kong originated before its spread throughout Malaysia, Singapore, and parts of Indonesia.
- Chinese: 大伯公
- Tâi-lô: Tuā-peh-kong / Tuā-peeh-kong
- Literal meaning: Grand Uncle
Transcriptions
Standard Mandarin
- Hanyu Pinyin: Dàbógōng
Hakka
- Romanization: Thai-pak-kûng
Yue: Cantonese
- Yale Romanization: Daaih-baak-gūng
- Jyutping: Daai^{6}-baak^{3}-gung^{1}
Southern Min
- Hokkien POJ: Tōa-peh-kong / Tōa-pe͘h-kong
- Tâi-lô: Tuā-peh-kong / Tuā-peeh-kong

Malay name
- Malay: Topekong

Indonesian name
- Indonesian: Toa Pekong/Tepekong

Tua Pek Kong (Chinese: 大伯公; Tâi-lô: Tuā-peh-kong) is a Taoist deity in the pantheon of Peranakan folk religion practiced by ethnic Chinese in Malaysia, Singapore, and parts of Indonesia.

Throughout Southeast Asia, Tua Pek Kong is referred as the "God of Prosperity", where he is thought to be an incarnation of the god "Fu" from the trio of "Fu Lu Shou" representing "Prosperity, Fortune and Longevity" or a sailor from Fujian who sacrificed himself for a fellow human.

== Background ==
One of the prominent Tua Pek Kong was named Zhang Li (张理) from the Hakka clan. His Indonesian Sumatra-bound boat was struck by wind and accidentally landed on Penang Island in present-day Malaysia, which at that time had only 50 inhabitants. He is believed to have arrived in the island 40 years earlier than Francis Light in 1746. After his death, the local people began worshipping him and built the Tua Pek Kong Temple there where he was buried behind the Sea Pearl Island Tua Pek Kong Temple in Tanjung Tokong. The story of the first Tua Pek Kong in Penang demonstrates the tradition of sworn brotherhood between the Chinese diaspora:

[Zhang Li] lived in the small community of fisher folks [sic] as a teacher. He was known for his kindness and friendliness – the villagers never failed to seek his guidance and help if had any problems. Two men became his sworn brothers – Chiu Hsiao Ching, a charcoal maker, and Ma Fu Choon, a blacksmith. As he was the eldest, he was addressed by the young in the village as Tuah Pek Kong [sic]. The trio seemed very much attached to one another. When the day's work was done, they would meet each other without fail in their favourite place in the village. One day, as the records continue, Chiu and Ma, as usual, went to meet their respected elder but were shocked to find him sitting motionless beside a huge boulder! They tried to awaken him but soon realised that their revered elder was no more alive [sic]. A sense of gloom seemed to overwhelm the residents of the village who helped to bury him beside the boulder. Chiu and Ma eventually died and they, too, were buried there beside their sworn eldest brother. Today, the "graves" of the trio can be found just behind the [Sea Pearl Island Tua Pek Kong] temple.

Since then, he has been worshipped by Malaysian Chinese throughout the country. Tua Pek Kong is often mistaken for Tu Di Gong, partially because of their physical similarities. Between 1865 until 1868, Chung Keng Quee was a principal donor to the Haichu-yu (Sea Pearl) Tua Pek Kong Temple in Tanjung Tokong, Penang.

== Temples ==
The oldest and the first Tua Pek Kong Temple in Malaysia is located in Tanjung Tokong, Penang which was established in a fishing village no later than 1792 that eventually sprouts the worship of Tua Pek Kong throughout West Malaysia, Singapore, East Malaysia and parts of Indonesia. In the foot of Bukit Cina (Chinese Hill) in Malacca City, the Poh San Teng Temple is dedicated to Tua Pek Kong. In Sarawak of East Malaysia, there are around 76 known Tua Pek Kong temples scattered throughout every Chinese settlement in the state; some of the famous temples are the Tua Pek Kong Temple, Kuching, the Tua Pek Kong Temple in coastal Miri which is built after an epidemic in the town, and the Tua Pek Kong Temple, Sibu with its 7-storey pagoda that has become one of the landmark for Sibu. In Batam of Indonesia, one of its notable Tua Pek Kong Temple is located in Nagoya, while in Singapore its most notable Tua Pek Kong temples is located in Balestier, Loyang, Kusu Island and Ubin.

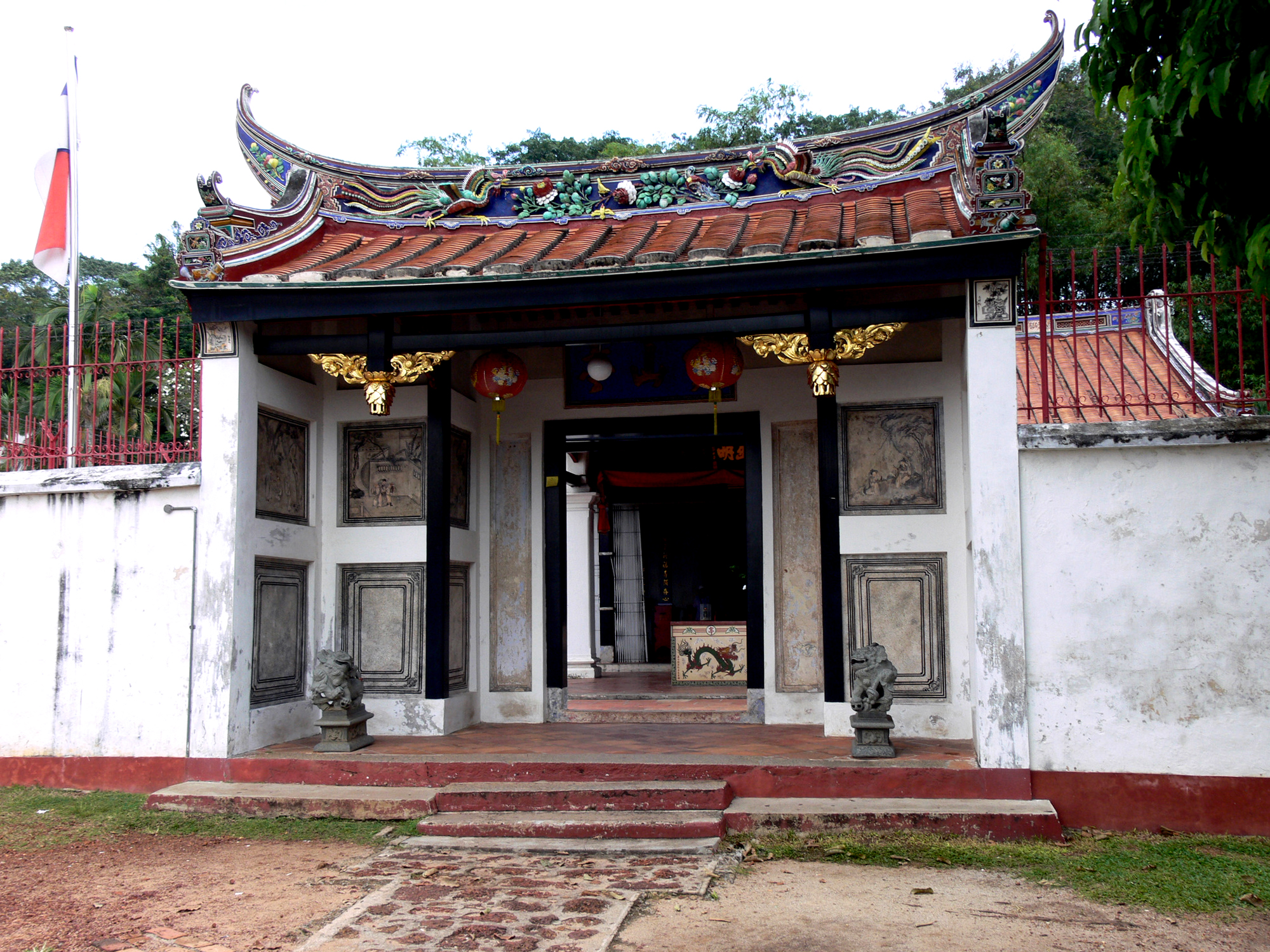
Poh San Teng Temple, Bukit Cina, Malacca City, Malaysia

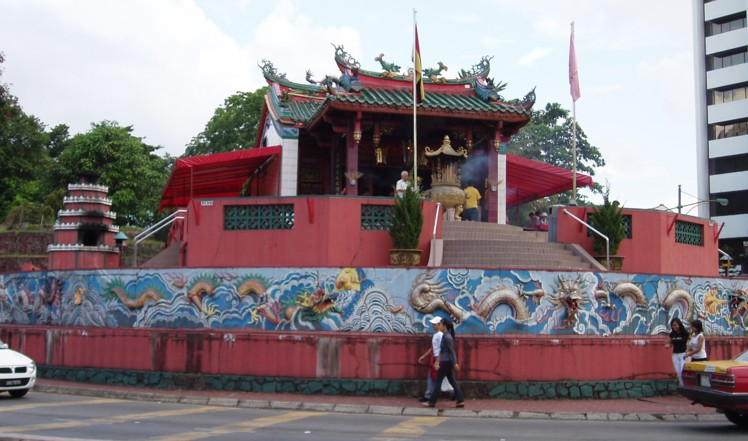
Tua Pek Kong Temple, Kuching, Malaysia

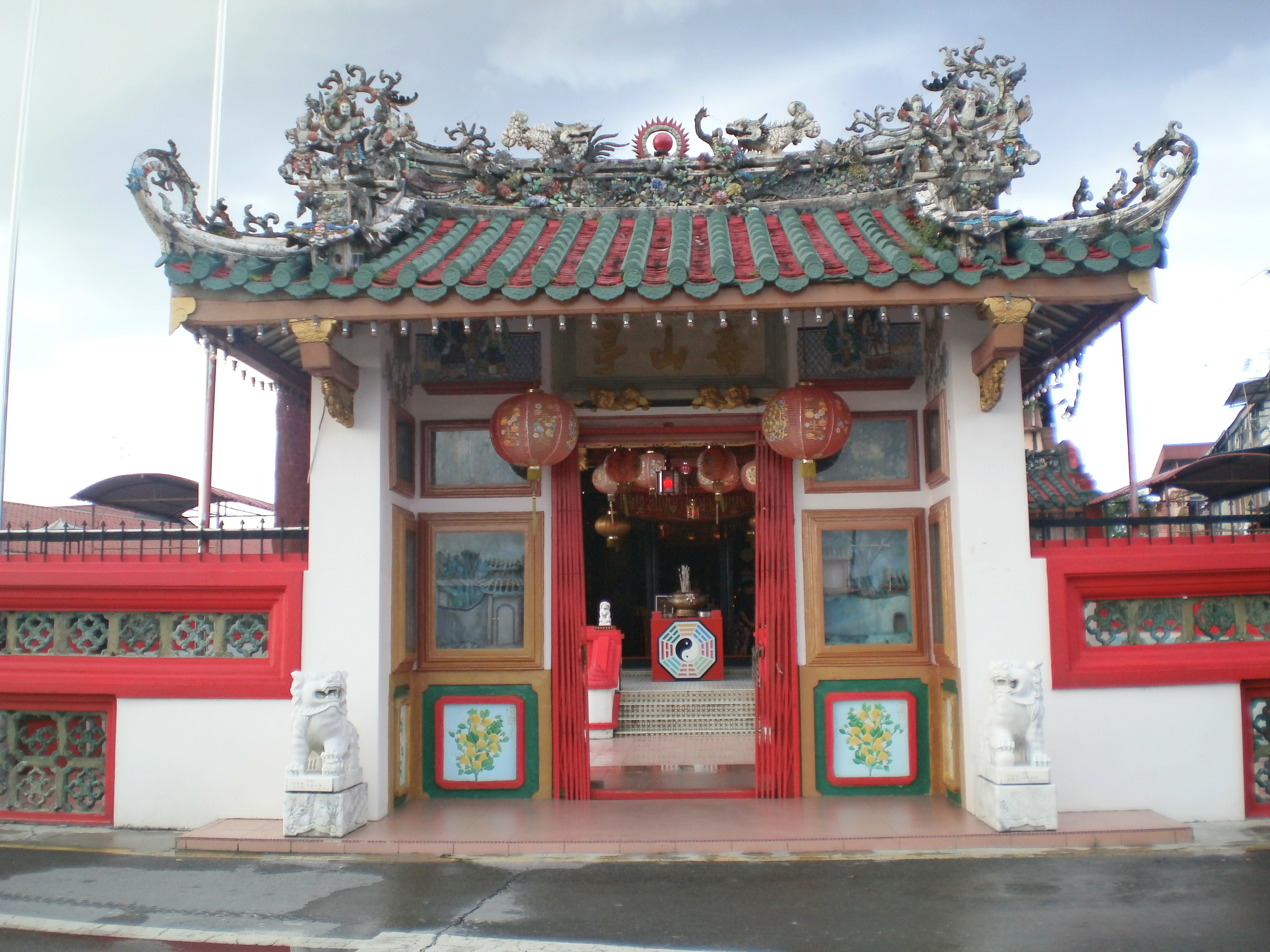
Tua Pek Kong Temple, Marudi, Malaysia

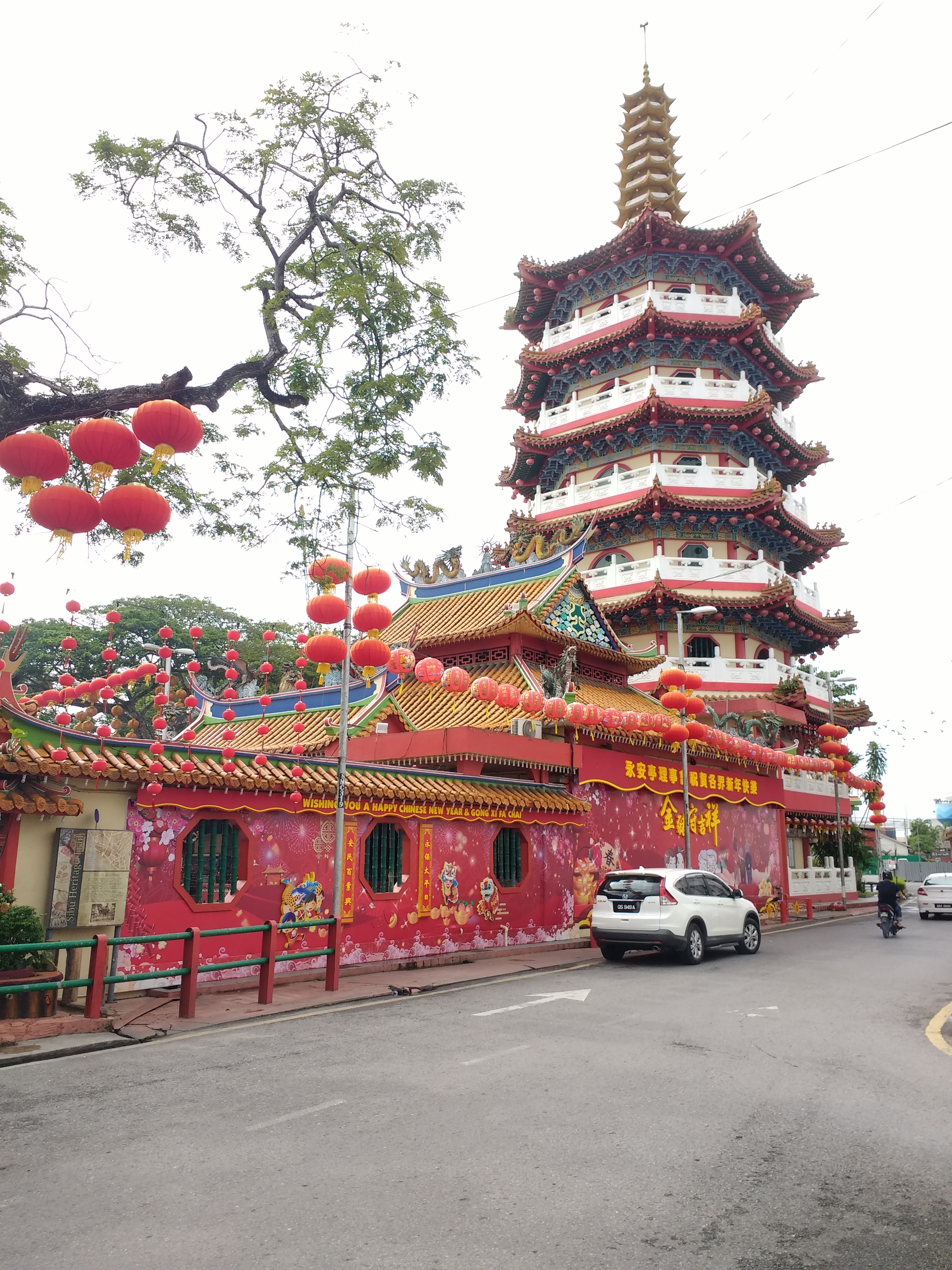
Pagoda of Tua Pek Kong Temple, Sibu, Malaysia

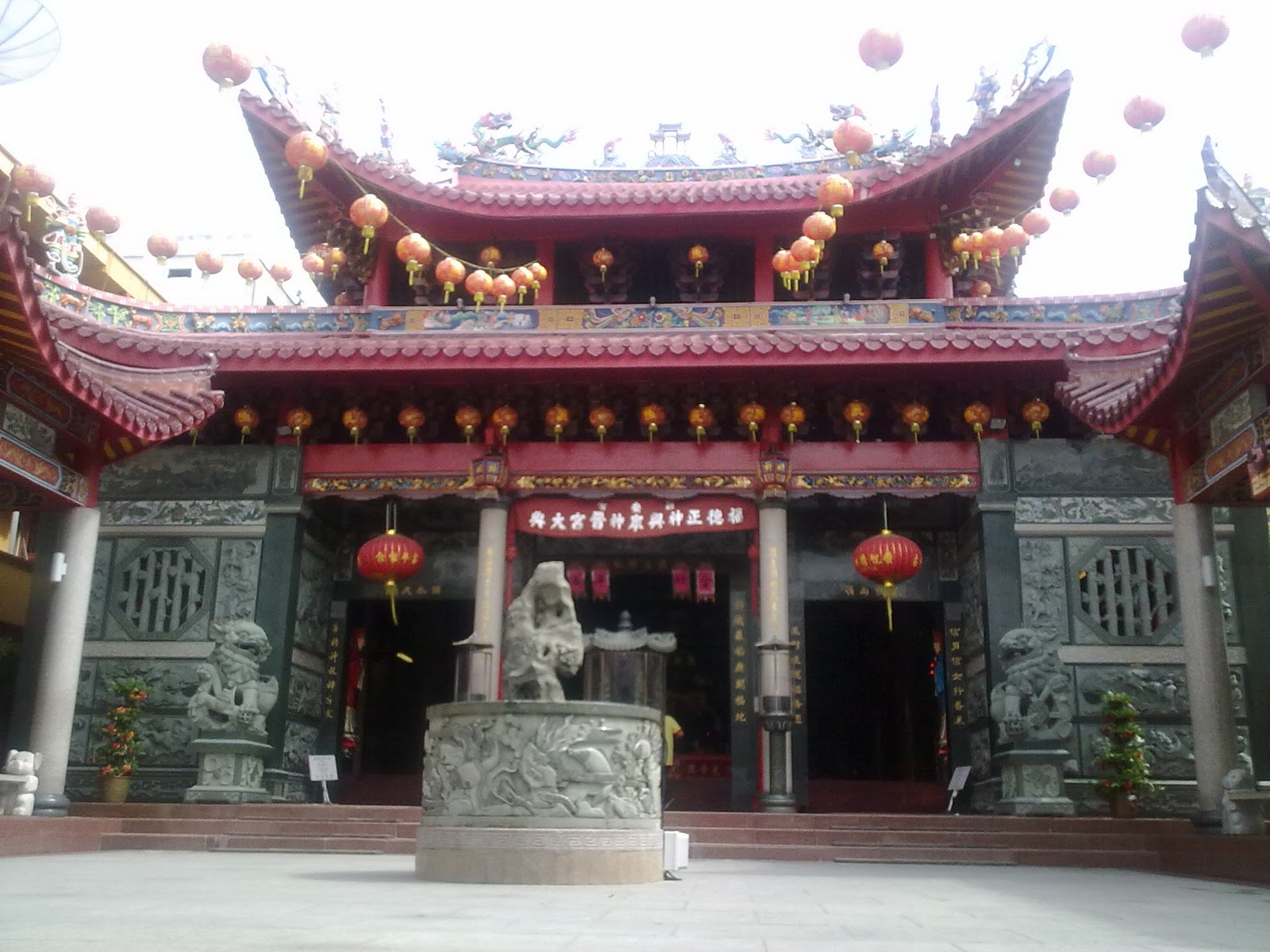
Hoo Ann Kiong Temple, Riau, Indonesia

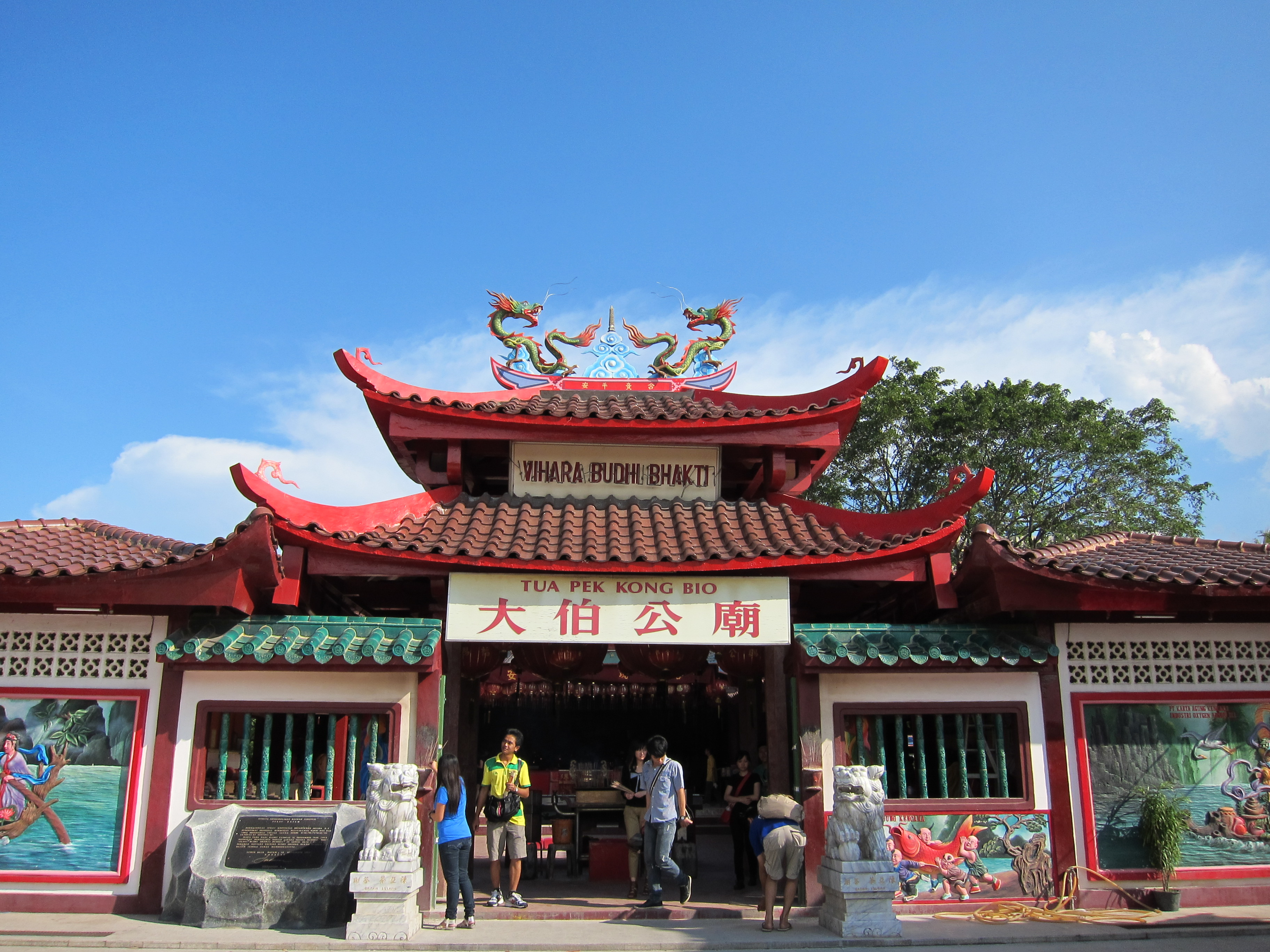
Tua Pek Kong Temple, Batam, Indonesia

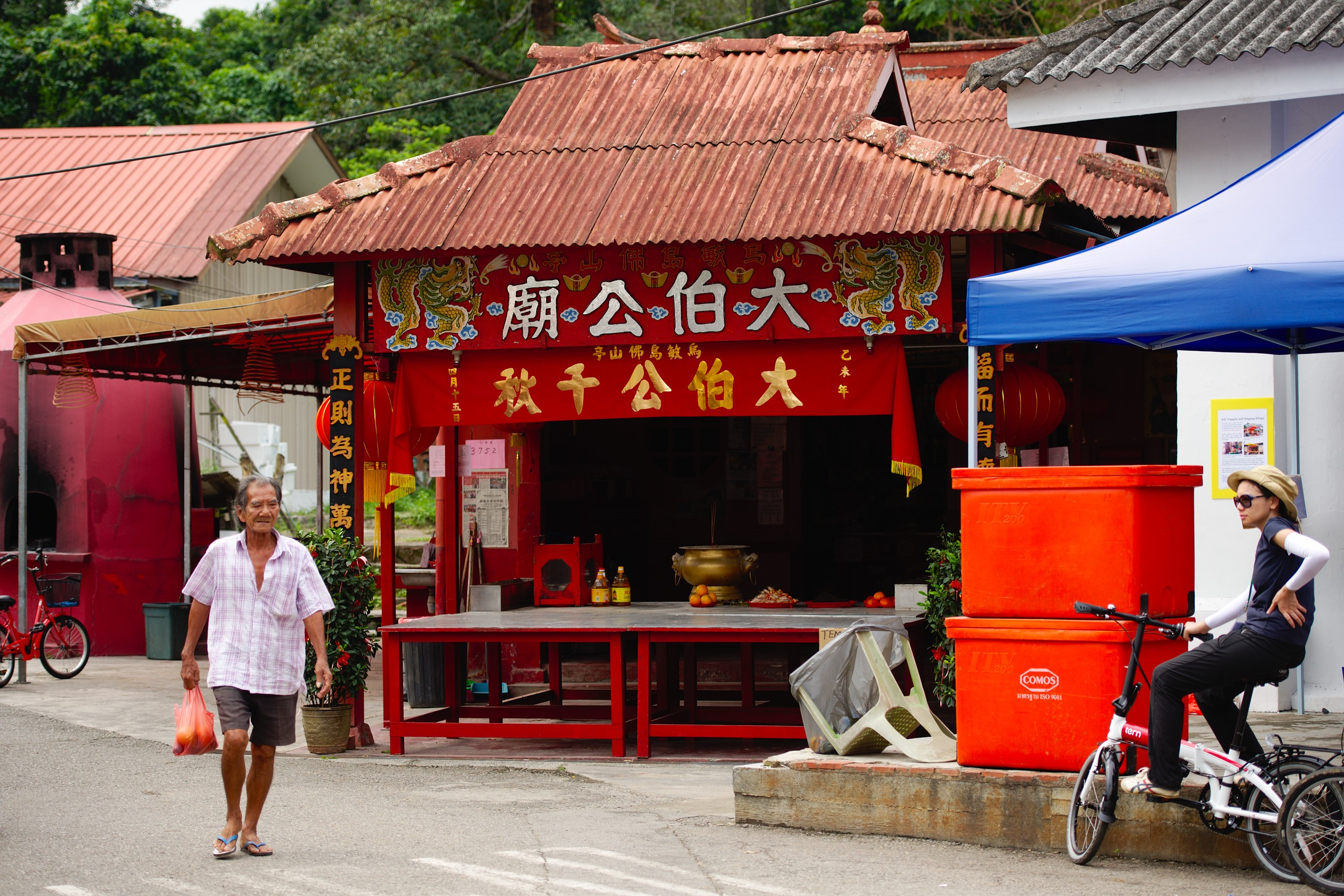
Fo Shan Ting Da Bo Gong Temple, Ubin, Singapore

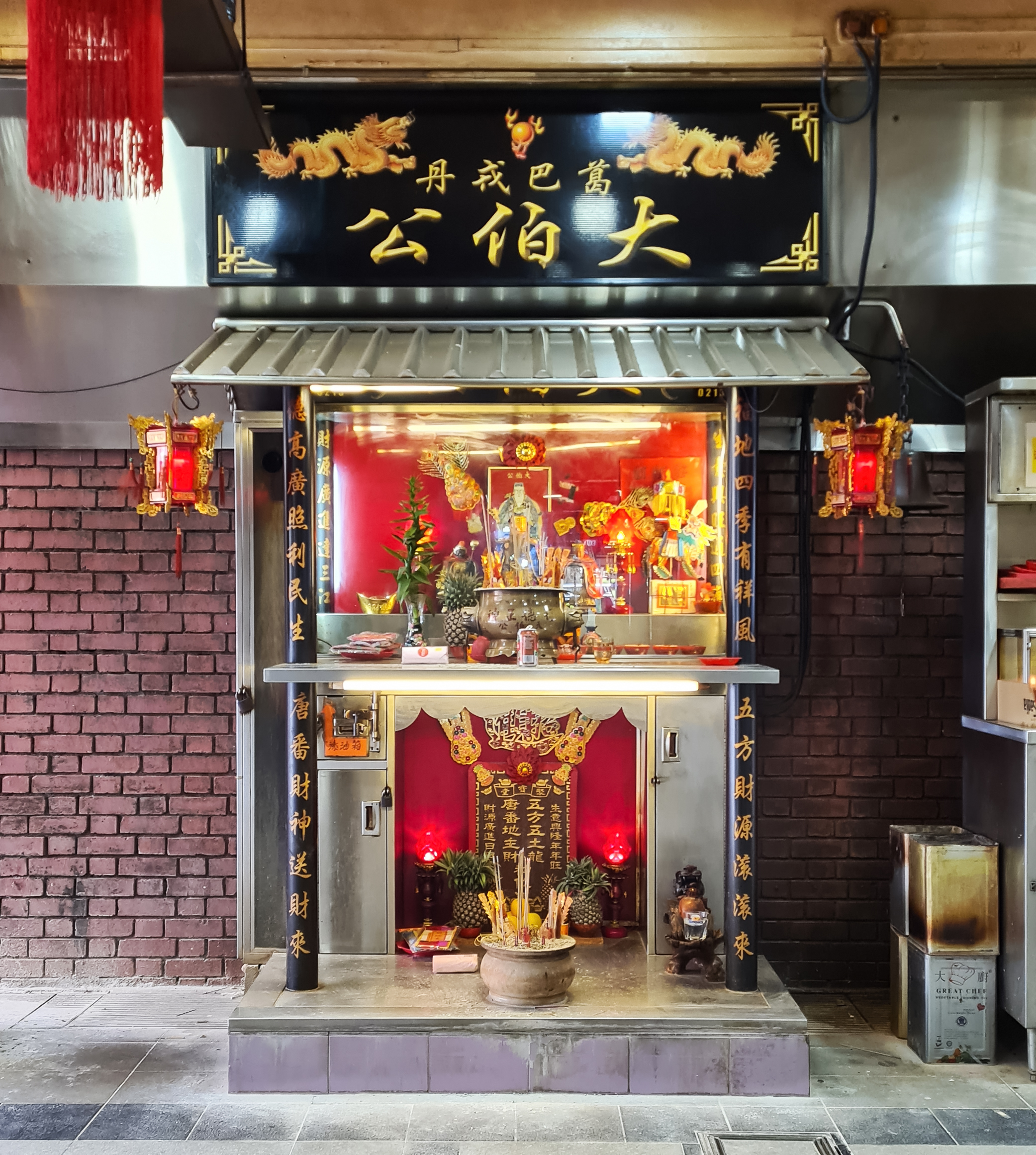
Tua Pek Kong shrine at a hawker centre in Singapore.

== See also ==
- Ancestor worship
- Chinese mythology
- Fengshui
- Chinese folk religion in Southeast Asia
- Malaysian folk religion
- Na Tuk Kong – Guardian spirits worshipped in overseas Chineses communities in maritime Southeast Asia
- Kusu Island – Southern Island in Singapore
