= Hang Li Po =

Chinese princess

Hang Li Po (Chinese: 漢麗寶; pinyin: Hàn Lìbǎo, or Wang Lìbǎo; Jyutping: Hon3 Lai6 Bou2; Pe̍h-ōe-jī: Hàn Lê-pó) was reported to be a Chinese princess sent by the Ming dynasty to marry Malaccan Sultan Mansur Shah (r. 1456–1477), according to the Malay Annals. However, there is debate on whether Hang Li Po was a real person, as there is no reference to Hang Li Po in any Ming dynasty records. Also, the 16th-century Portuguese account Suma Oriental does not mention a Chinese princess married to Sultan Mansur Shah, but instead refers to an unnamed Chinese girl who married Malacca’s second ruler, Sultan Megat Iskandar Shah (r. 1414–1424), with three decades between the two rulers.

The princess's vast entourage was recorded to be 500 followers and Sultan Mansur Shah provided a hill for their settlement, now known as Bukit Cina, as a gift to his new Chinese bride, in the mid-15th century. Now, there are more than 12,000 graves in the cemetery and the oldest dates back to 1622. After the Portuguese conquered Malacca in 1511, the forested Bukit Cina was razed by Portuguese missionaries, who established a monastery atop the hill in 1581. When the Dutch captured Malacca from the Portuguese in 1641, the Dutch colonial administration re-designated Bukit Cina as a Chinese cemetery in 1685.

The figure of Hang Li Po was an early example of transculturation and interracial marriage in the early history of the Malay Archipelago. The cultural and genealogical heritage from her era is seen in the Peranakan culture. The descendants of the Peranakans are found in Penang and Malacca which are characterized by a hybridization of ancient Chinese culture with the local cultures of Maritime Southeast Asia. With the Islamization of the Malay Archipelago from the 15th century onwards, the trend of inter-ethnic marriage went into decline in the region.

The legend of Hang Li Po was an important figure in Malaysian national consciousness, as she was a person of Chinese ancestry who lived among Malay Muslims, bearing a royal seal of approval during the early history of the Malay Archipelago paving the way for the cultural acceptance and social assimilation of Chinese immigrant laborers who were later brought to the Malay Peninsula during the British colonial period during the 18th and 19th century.

== See also ==
- Malaysian Chinese
- Nyonya
- Sultanate of Malacca
