= Tua Pek Kong Temple, Sibu =

Temple in Malaysia

Tua Pek Kong Temple
- Malay: Tokong Tua Pek Kong; Chinese: 永安厅大伯公庙
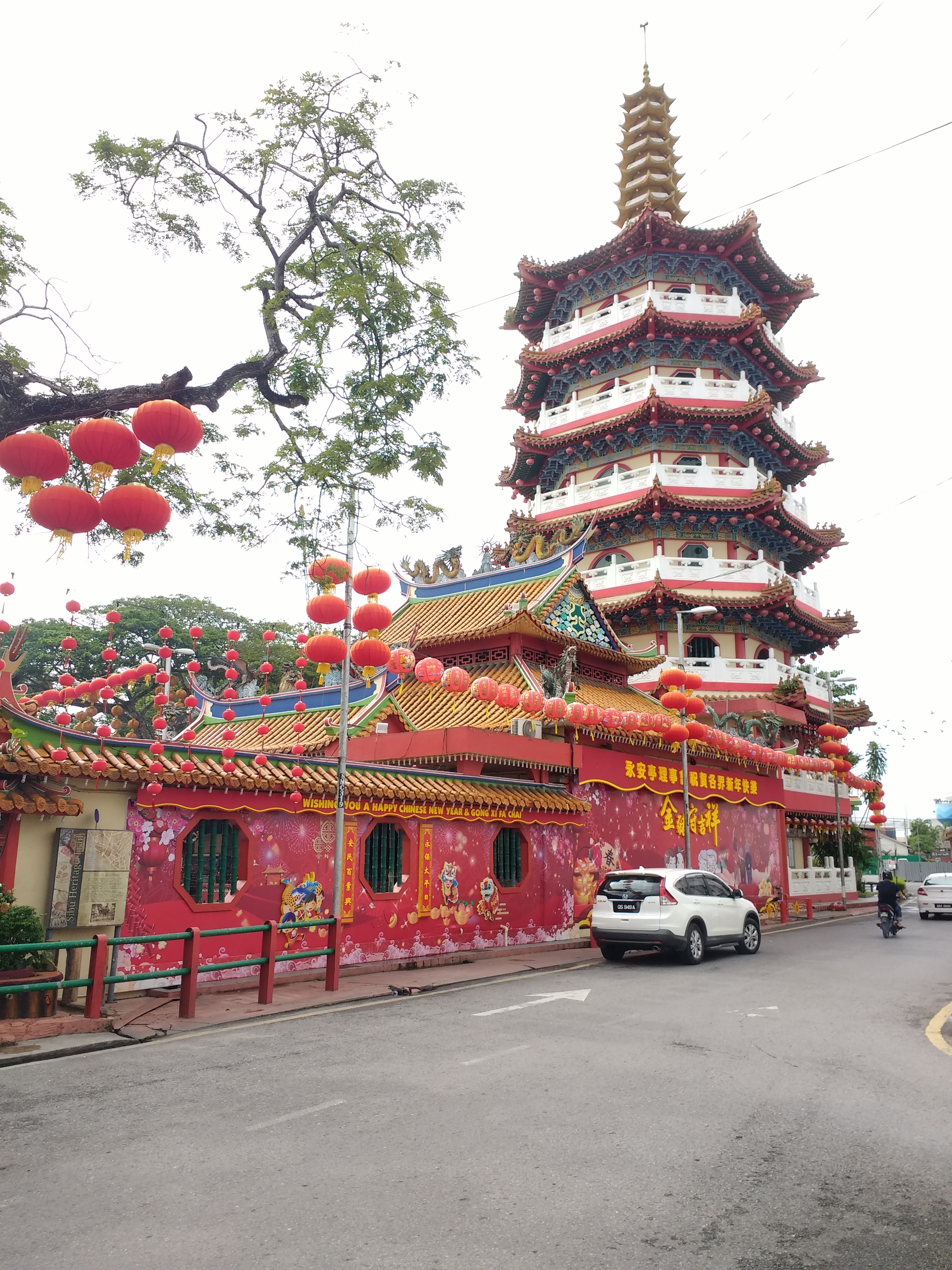
- The Tua Pek Kong Temple

Religion
- Affiliation: Taoism
- District: Sibu District

Location
- Location: Sibu
- State: Sarawak
- Country: Malaysia
- Interactive map of Tua Pek Kong Temple
- Coordinates: 2°17′14″N 111°49′34″E

Architecture
- Type: Chinese temple, pagoda
- Established: 1850s

Tua Peh Kong Temple (Chinese: 永安厅大伯公庙; Pe̍h-ōe-jī: Éng-an-thiaⁿ Tōa-peh-kong-biō) (also called Sibu Eng Ann Teng Tua Peh Kong) in Sibu, Sarawak, Malaysia is the oldest Chinese temple in the town with a 7-storey pagoda with the temple history dates back to 1850s.

== History ==
The temple history dates back to early 1850s, and later being mentioned in the Kingdom of Sarawak Government's Report of "Sarawak Gazette" in 1871. In 1897, the temple was rebuilt into a typical Chinese Taoist temple architecture designed with tiled roof, stone block floor and all the decorative purlin and fixtures which were imported from China; the statue of Tua Pek Kong deity was specially sculptured and imported from Xiamen. After the building was completed, the list of donors and details of expenditure were recorded in two pieces of stone tablet which are still well preserved in the temple. On 8 March 1928, Sibu town was destroyed by a big fire with the temple survived and remain unscathed. The temple however destroyed through the World War II despite its deity remained unharmed. After the end of the war, the wooden structure temple was rebuilt.

In 1957, the temple was reconstructed into a concrete structure and was declared open by the then Governor of Sarawak, Sir Anthony Abell. It was a grand occasion for the Sibu Town as the British Royal dignitaries including the Resident attended the ceremony. Another renovation on both wings of the temple was being carried out in 1979 and the roof of temple was changed from "belian" (Eusideroxylon zwageri) wood into concrete with glazed roofing tiles; the ridge or roof and column were decorated with traditional dragon and phoenix statues. In 1982, the temple management committee planning to re-build the rear part and construct a 7-storey pagoda for the worship of the Goddess of Mercy where the plan is being realised in 1987 through the aid from Sarawak state government and the temple worshippers. The new pagoda followed closely the traditional Chinese pagoda architecture and subsequently became one of the landmark for Sibu. The renovated building was declared open in 1989.
