= Xiang Lin Si Temple =

Chinese Buddhist temple in Melaka City, Melaka, Malaysia

- Malay: Tokong Xiang Lin Si; Chinese: 香林寺
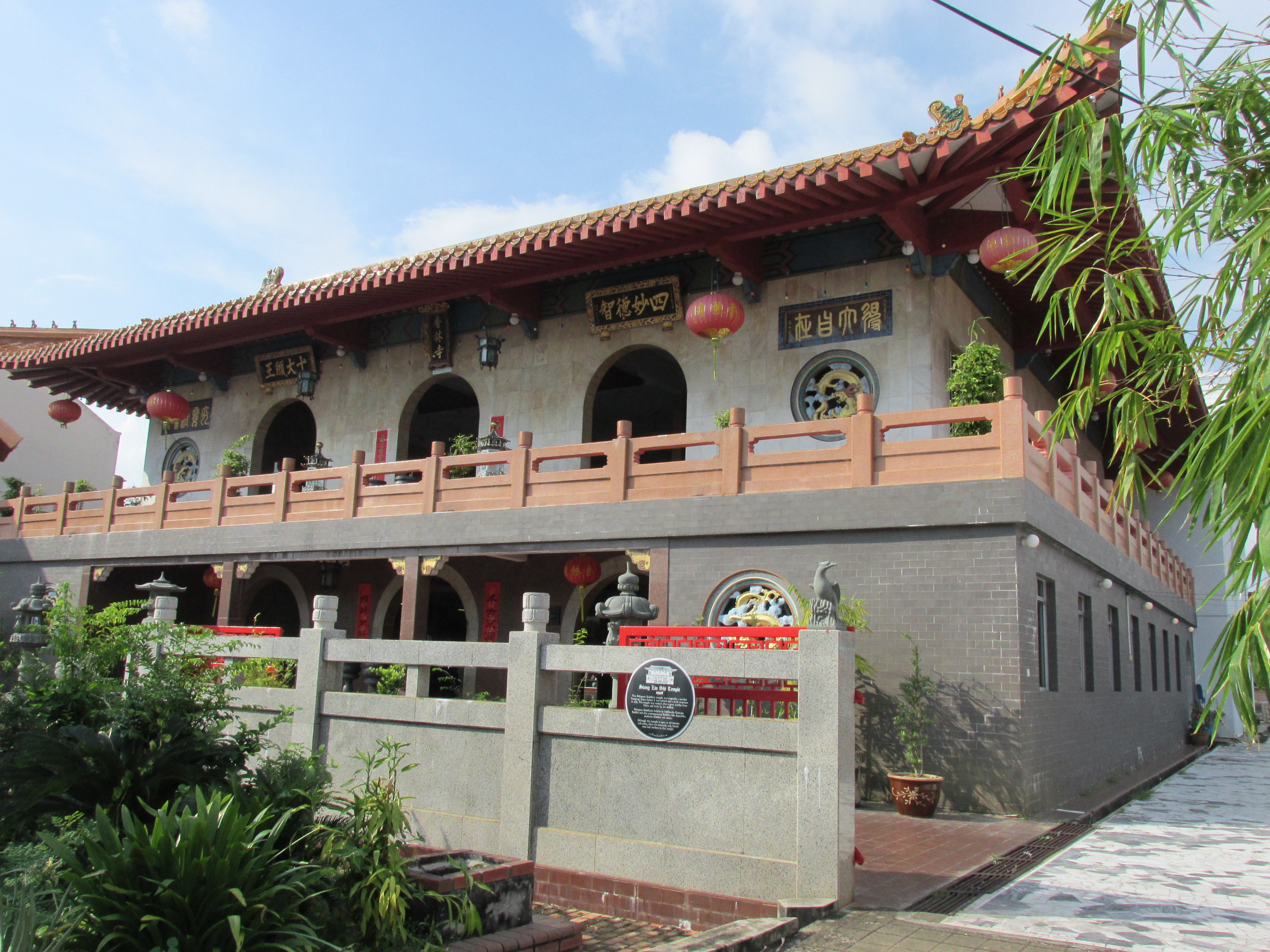

Religion
- Affiliation: Buddhism

Location
- Location: Malacca City
- State: Malacca
- Country: Malaysia
- Geographic coordinates: 2°11′52.734″N 102°14′48.46″E

Architecture
- Type: Chinese temple
- Date established: 1985

Xiang Lin Si Temple (Chinese: 香林寺; pinyin: Xiāng Línsì) is a Chinese temple located opposite of Cheng Hoon Teng Temple in Jalan Tokong, Malacca City. This double-storey temple follows the Buddhist branch of Mahāyāna Buddhism.

== History ==
The temple is named after a monk from China, started as a village-style wooden house in 1958 before being rebuilt in a modern architecture as a double-storey brick building in 1985.

== Features ==
The two-storey temple has a three arch doorways on each level. In the first doorway which is the Buddha Hall, there is a small smiling statue of Mi-lo Fwo (Maitreya) in a short altar facing the door. The Eighteen Luohan are lined up on both sides of the Buddha Hall, nine on each side, leading to a smaller statue of Gautama Buddha in the centre. Behind the Buddha statues is the statue of Goddess of Mercy (Guan Yin). The temple also kept a complete collection of the Pāli Canon, a religious scripture of Buddhism. The second floor of the temple is a convenient spot for capturing scenic photos of its neighbouring temple of Cheng Hoon Teng and the rest of the "Harmony Street" because of its proximity to the Kampung Kling Mosque and Sri Poyatha Moorthi Temple, which symbolises religious tolerance existed long before the founding of the modern state of Malaysia.

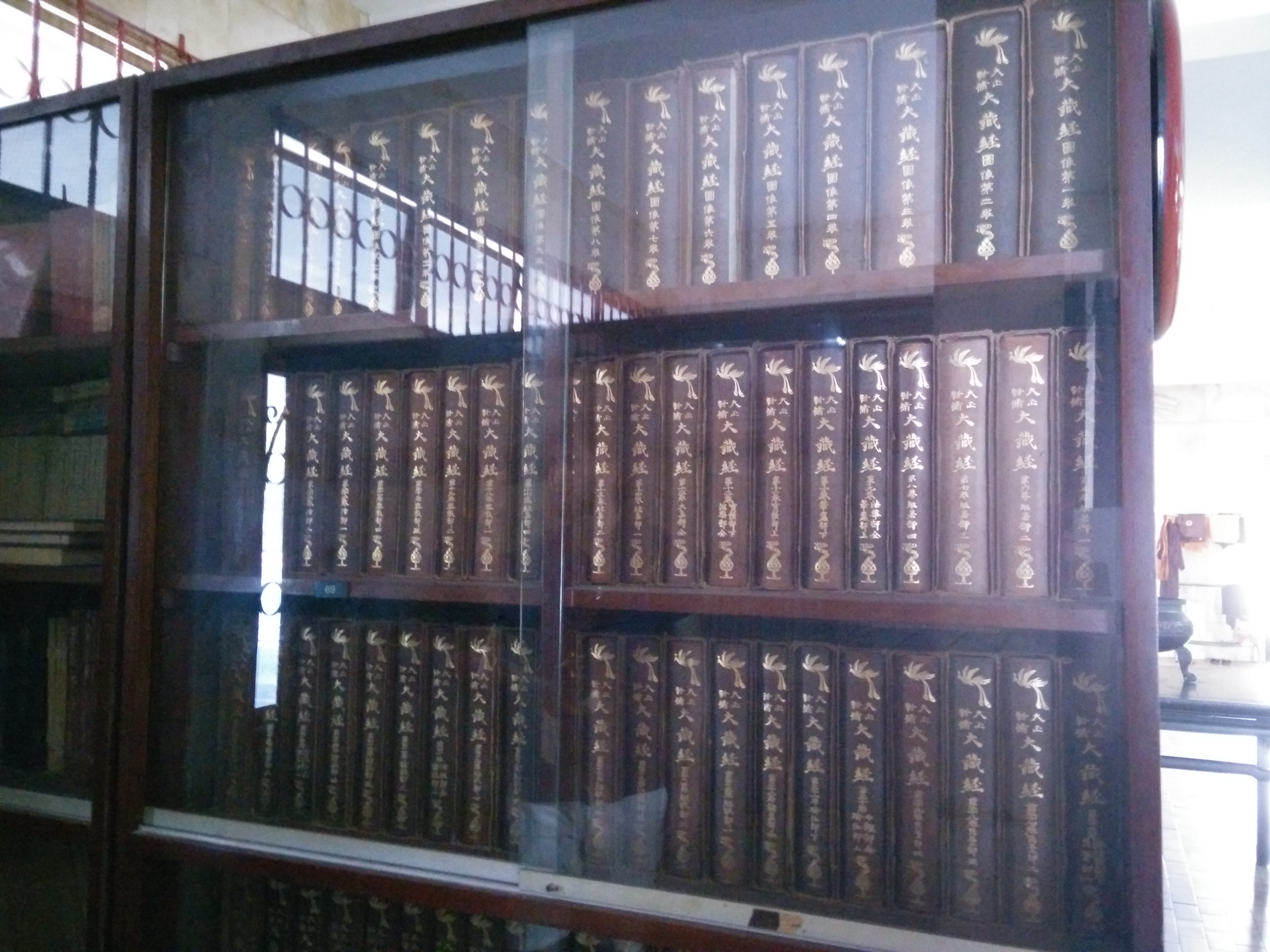
Complete set of Pāli Canon found in the temple.

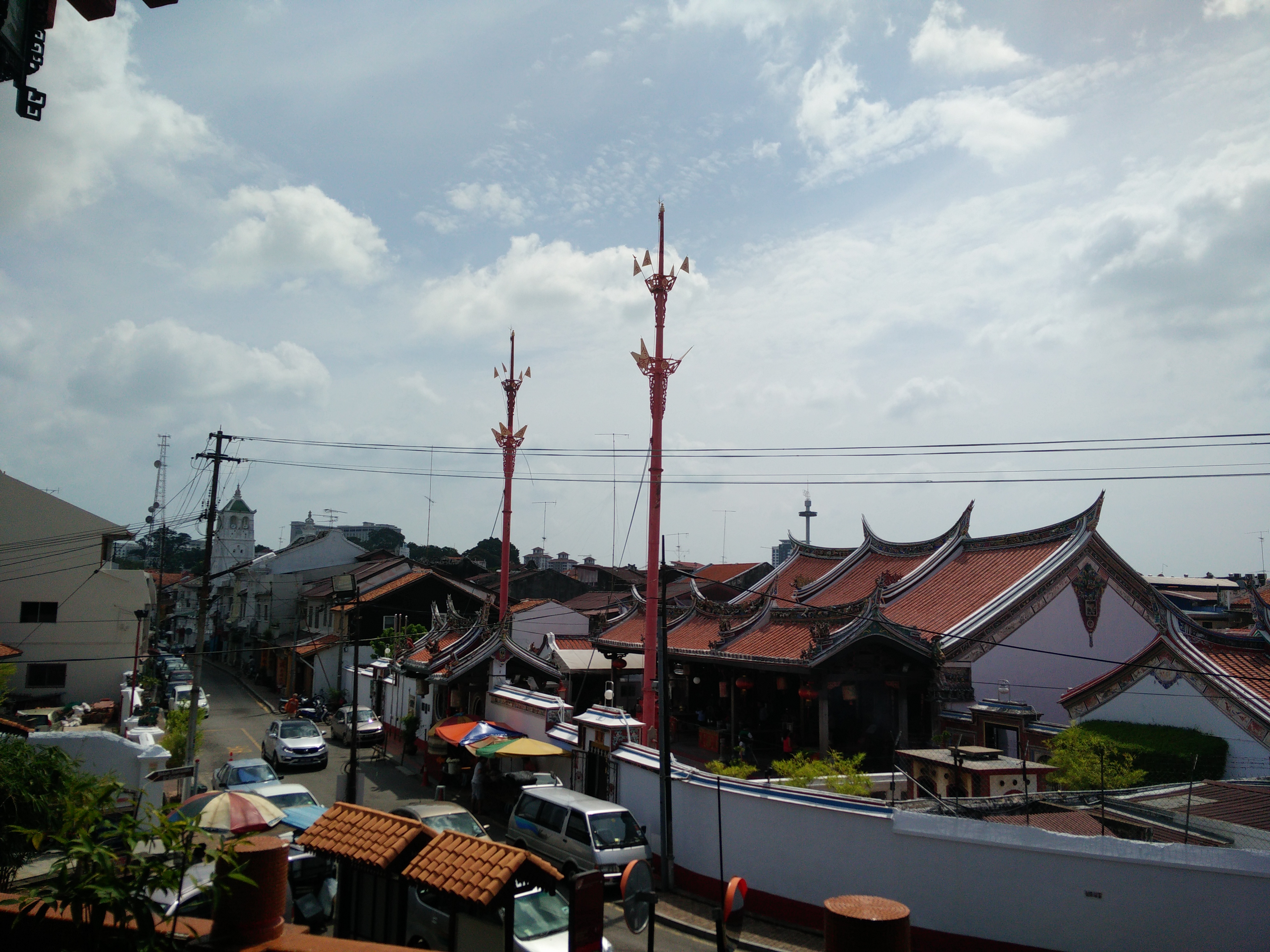
Photo of Harmony Street taken from the second floor of the temple.
