= Bukit Cina =

Chinese cemetery in Malacca, Malaysia

- 三宝山
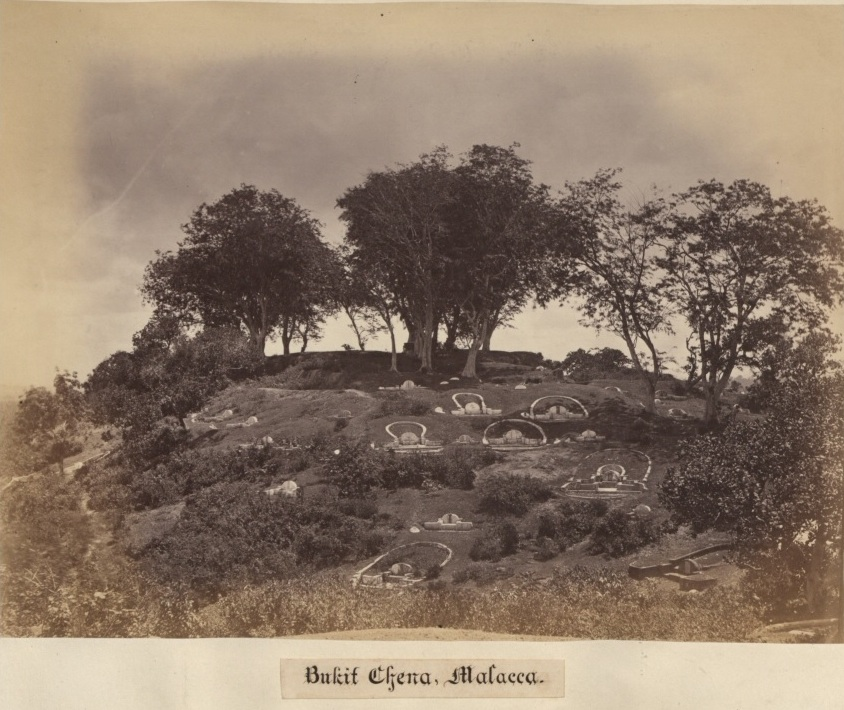
- The cemetery on Bukit China c. 1860–1900
- Interactive map of Bukit Cina

Details
- Location: Malacca City, Malacca
- Country: Malaysia
- No. of graves: 12,000+

Bukit China (Malay: "Chinese Hill"; Chinese: 三宝山) is a hillside of historical significance in Malacca City, the capital of the Malaysian state of Malacca. It is located several kilometres to the north from the historical centre of Malacca (Dutch town and Chinatown). The site is today surrounded by the modern city on all sides.

== History ==
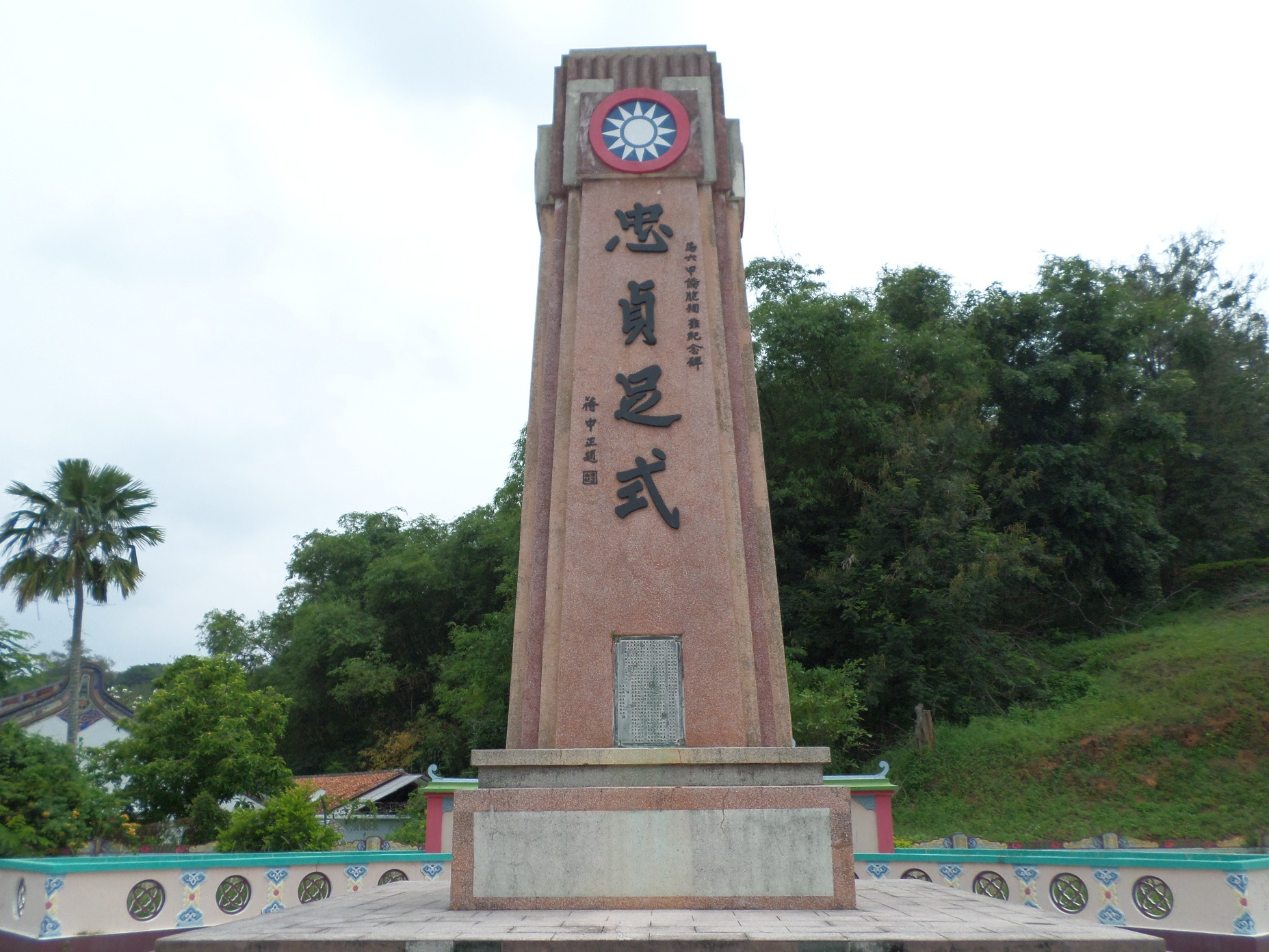
Memorial to honour the local Chinese residents who perished during World War II

According to local tradition, in the mid-15th century, the legendary Hang Li Po was sent to be married to the sultan of Malacca, Mansur Shah, to seal relations between the two states. The hill, Bukit Cina, a gift from the sultan, was established as their residence. Marine archaeology of a shipwreck (Royal Nanhai wreck from about 1460 AD) suggested royal gifts from China, shipped during Sultan Mansor Shah's reign.

The Well of Perigi Raja, situated next to Poh San Teng Temple (mistakenly known as Sam Po Kong Temple) at the foot of the hill (2.1966°N 102.2562°E), was constructed by Hang Li Po's followers for her personal use but was also an important source of water for much of the town. It was also a prime target for opposition forces, which either poisoned it or tried to hold it for their own use. It was reputed never to have dried up even during droughts. Today, the well has acquired the reputation of a wishing well and it is believed that anyone who throws a coin into the well will return to Malacca.

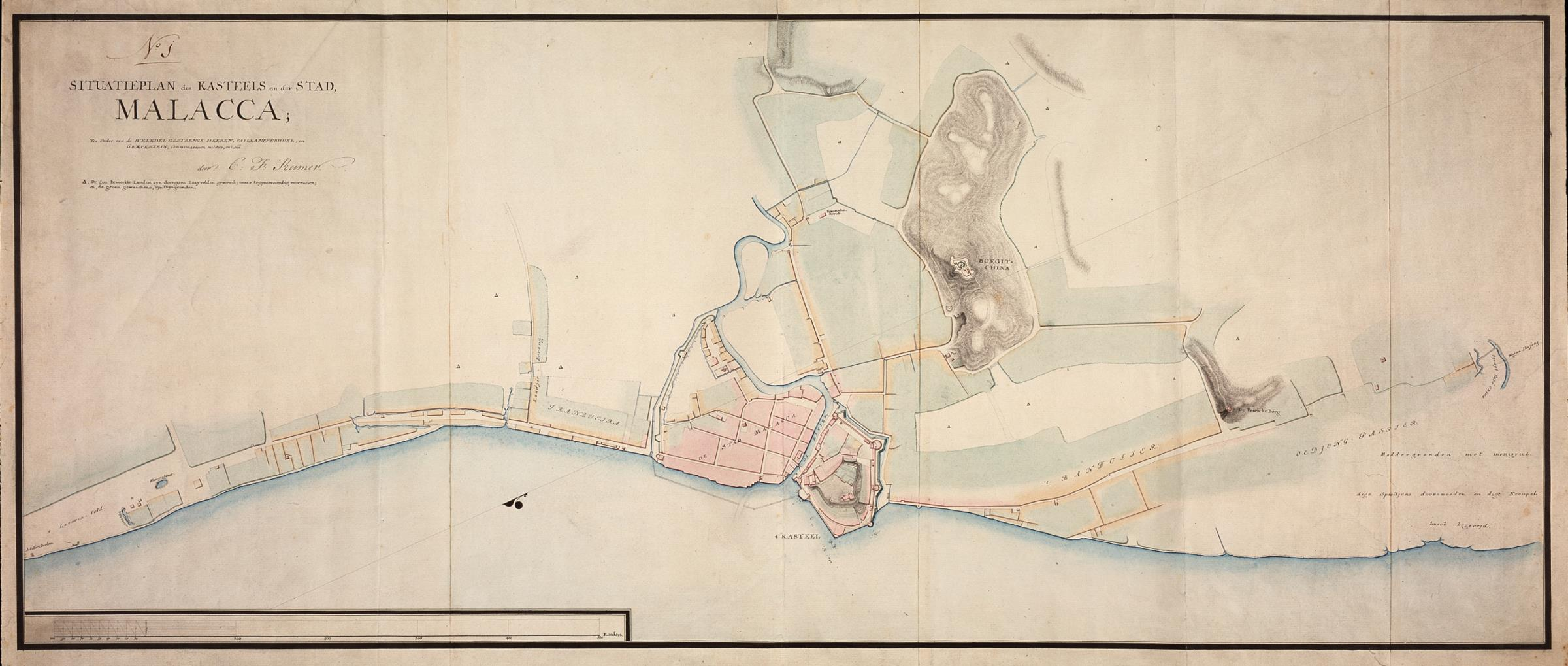
Map of Dutch Malacca in the latter 18th century, showing Bukit Cina in the northeast

Bukit Cina and two adjoining hills today form a Chinese graveyard covering over 250,000 square metres. With over 12,000 graves, some of which date to the Ming Dynasty, it is said to be the largest Chinese graveyard outside China.

== Admiral Zheng He's Seven Dragon Wells ==
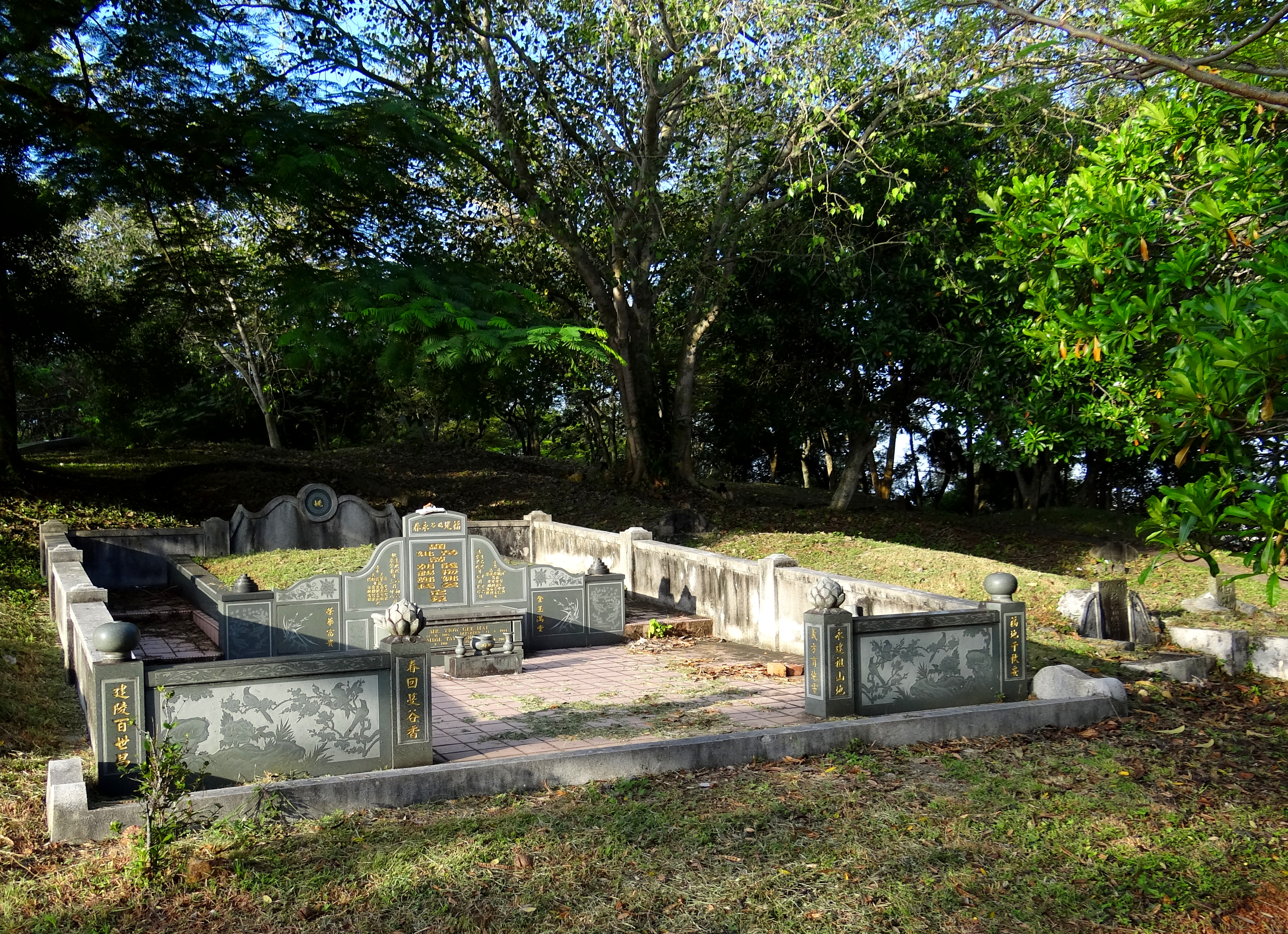
A well-kept but otherwise typical grave

Admiral Zheng He (Cheng Ho)'s Seven Wells lie in the foot of the Bukit China, beside the Poh San Teng Temple. These wells were dug by Admiral Zheng He's expedition force during their stopover in Malacca during the Ming dynasty. Bukit Cina was chosen by Zheng He to be used as the base for his expeditionary force. The Seven Wells are also known as the Dragon's wells according to fengshui principles. some of these wells were bulldozed during the 1950-60s for road building. To-date, only three wells are left intact and they have never been waterless even in the worst of drought.

Zheng He's visit is recorded in verified Chinese history as compared to the fabled lore of Perigi Raja wells. Zheng He, acting under the orders of the Yongle Emperor, escorted Princess Hang Li Poh to be wed to Sultan Mansor Shah, in the 15th century. As a gift to Hang Li Poh and the Chinese settlers in Bukit Cina, Zheng He dug seven wells, which is originally known as the Perigi Raja and mistakenly called "Hang Li Poh's well".

Due to the political and racial tension in the country since 2008, several rumours and disagreement regarding the history of the seven wells and also the existence of Hang Li Poh herself arose. This has contributed to many accusation being thrown to the local government by various NGOs and the opposition as the culprit of making the Malay history more colourful using it as a propaganda tool to gain support from the Chinese community.

However, the accusation by certain parties that the historical details of Zheng He's expedition force puts the Malay kingdom's sovereignty in a bad light, appeared to be questionable as it is well recorded that Zheng He, who voyaged to Malacca several times, did establish a regional headquarters in Malacca in the 15th century to conduct regional diplomatic and entrepot activities in Southeast Asia due to the close relation between the Chinese empire and the kingdom of Malacca as well as the importance of Malacca as an entrepot in Southeast Asia.

== See also ==
- Cheng Hoon Teng Temple
- Poh San Teng Temple
- Malacca Warrior Monument
- Peranakans
- Chinese Malaysians
- Overseas Chinese
- Hang Li Poh

== Sources ==
- De Witt, Dennis (2010). Melaka from the Top. Malaysia: Nutmeg Publishing. ISBN 978-983-43519-2-2.
