= Melaka Warrior Monument =

Monument at Bukit Cina in Malacca City, Malacca, Malaysia

- Tugu Pahlawan-pahlawan Melaka 马六甲华人抗日义士纪念碑
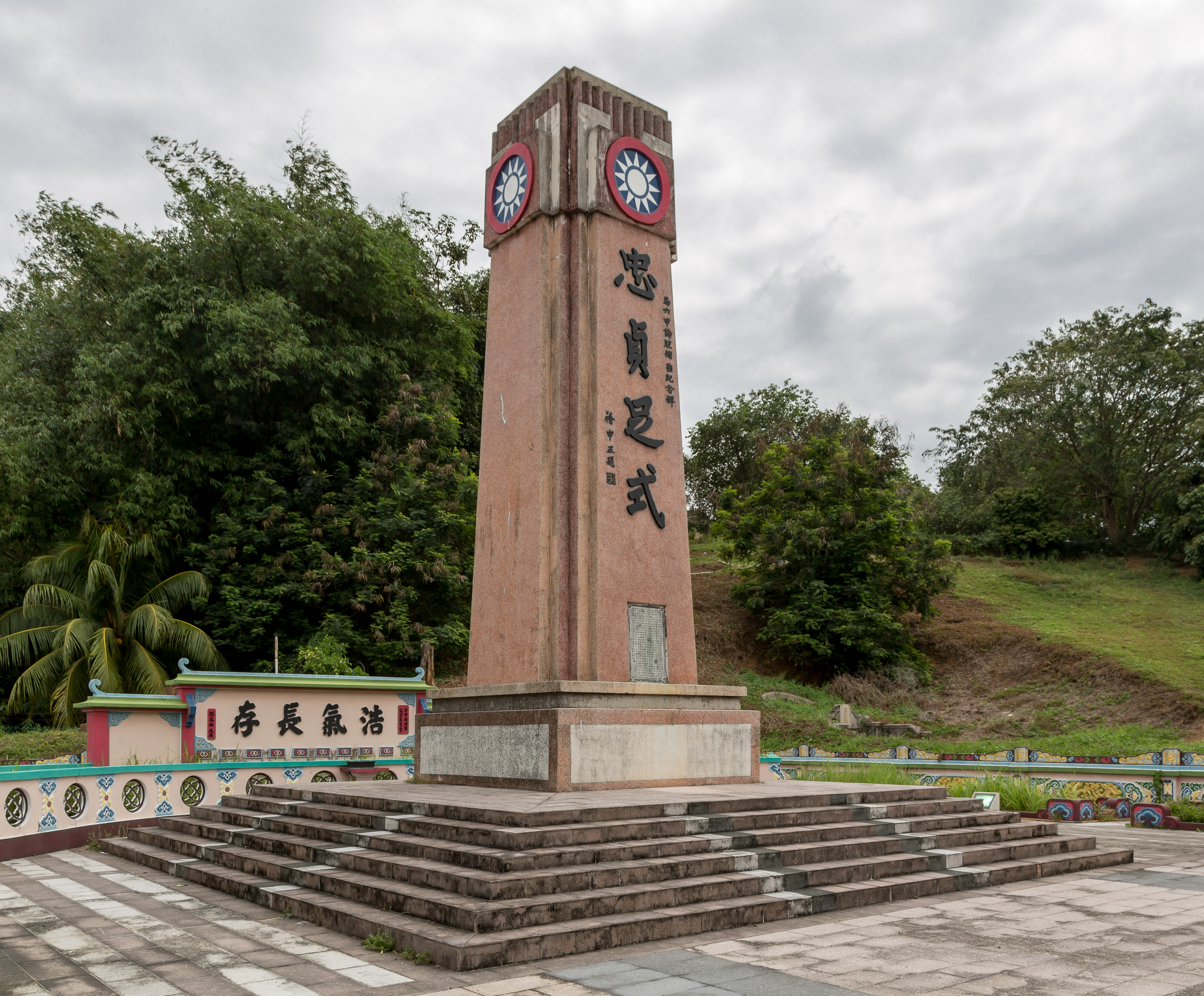
- Location: Bukit Cina in Malacca City, Malacca, Malaysia
- Coordinates: 2°11′44.3″N 102°15′19.6″E
- Type: Monument
- Completion date: 1948
- Restored date: 1972

Melaka Warrior Monument, (Note: This monument uses the Malay language spelling of the state's name, as opposed to the more traditional English language spelling of its name, "Malacca".) officially the Melaka Warrior Monument for the Chinese victims of Anti-Japanese occupation (Chinese: 马六甲华人抗日义士纪念碑; pinyin: Mǎliùjiǎ huárén kàngrì yìshì jìniànbēi; lit. 'Malacca Chinese Anti-Japanese Volunteers Monument', Malay: Tugu Pahlawan-pahlawan Melaka untuk Mangsa-mangsa Cina akibat menentang penjajahan Jepun, lit. 'Malacca Warrior Monument for the Chinese victims as a result of opposing Japanese colonisation' (Note: The Malay word for "occupation" is "pendudukan", also occupation is different from colonisation. While occupation is a temporary military control of a foreign territory, colonisation is a long-term process where a foreign power establishes political and economic control over another territory.)) is a monument at Bukit Cina in Malacca City, Malacca, Malaysia. It was built to commemorate the Chinese victims of the Japanese occupation of Malacca as part of the British Straits Settlements during World War II and was unveiled officially by the then high commissioner, Sir Edward Gent in 1948. The first known major renovation for the monument was in 1972. The monument is inscribed with four Chinese characters, "忠貞足式" (pinyin: Zhōng Zhēn Zú Shì) in Chiang Kai-shek's handwriting, which means "their (those who have fought against the Japanese) loyalty can be taken as an exemplar".

== Epitaph ==
The epitaph is written in Classical Chinese and is translated as below:

After the Marco Polo Bridge Incident, the Overseas Chinese called for the opposition of the Japanese rule and rallied for the rescue of the country by donating money and belongings. The Chinese diaspora in Nanyang joined the Allies in armed conflicts against the Japanese, thus the Japanese suppressed the Chinese diaspora for opposing them.

On 15 January, the 31st year of the Republic of China, the Japanese conquered Malacca, and the local expatriates suffered terrible encounters. In the beginning, the Japanese Army searched door-to-door for anti-Japanese dissidents, and approximately 300 people were killed for being involved in anti-Japanese efforts. After that, 56 workers from the Asahan Sawmill, roughly 300 residents of Kampung Machap, 17 mowers of De Xing Rubber Estate, and about 200 residents of Jasin Hot Spring Area and other villages were killed, one after another. Thousands were killed by the Japanese Army; some were killed by sword, some were crushed on their skull, some were disemboweled, some were buried alive collectively, and some were trapped in a closed room, then burnt alive. Despite this, they faced their demise with courage and the Japanese with no fear. Some berated the Japanese right in front of them before dying and some remained silent until the end. It was rare to hear about people pleading and surrendering to the Japanese. It is evident that they stuck to their principles and died heroically.

Now, the Japanese had surrendered and retreated; the war is over. To commend them, the surviving expatriates interred the corpses in Bukit Cina, erected a monument, and recorded the event on a plaque. Layers of red sky, resounds the name of China; the seemingly endless Southern Ocean, erects a statue of Zheng He. Although the corpses are interred in a foreign country, they now have a better home. Their meritorious contributions shall be passed on [from generation to generation], the upright spirits shall gather and spread their deeds, forever. They have sacrificed themselves for Ren, so they shall rest in peace.

Composed and written by Dai Kuisheng of Nan'an ancestry
Respects from all Malaccan Chinese expatriates
5th of May, the 37th year of the Republic of China

== Commemorative tablet ==
A tablet commemorating the unveiling of the monument reads:

In memory of the unfortunate Chinese victims during the Japanese occupation in Malacca.

When the Japanese invaded China, the overseas Chinese everywhere formed anti-Japanese movements. Their resistance included remittance to China and also taking up arms alongside the allies in defence of their countries of residence. Malacca fell into the hand of the Japanese on the 15th day of January, 1942.

Thousands of Chinese lost their lives. The methods of execution were barbaric and inhuman. Burying a few hundred people alive in a well and throwing babies and children into the air and catching them with fixed bayonets are but two of the many awesome methods adopted.

After the surrender of the Japanese, the remains of these victims were collected from various known places by the Chinese residents and collectively buried at the foot of this Bukit China Hill.

This monument erected in memory of these unfortunate and heroic deeds was unveiled officially by his Excellency Sir Edward Gent Then High Commissioner of the Federation of Malaya.

On the 5th day of April 1948

== See also ==
- List of tourist attractions in Malacca
