= Cheng Hoon Teng Temple =

Buddhist temple in Melaka, Malaysia

- Malay: Tokong Cheng Hoon Teng; Chinese: 青云亭
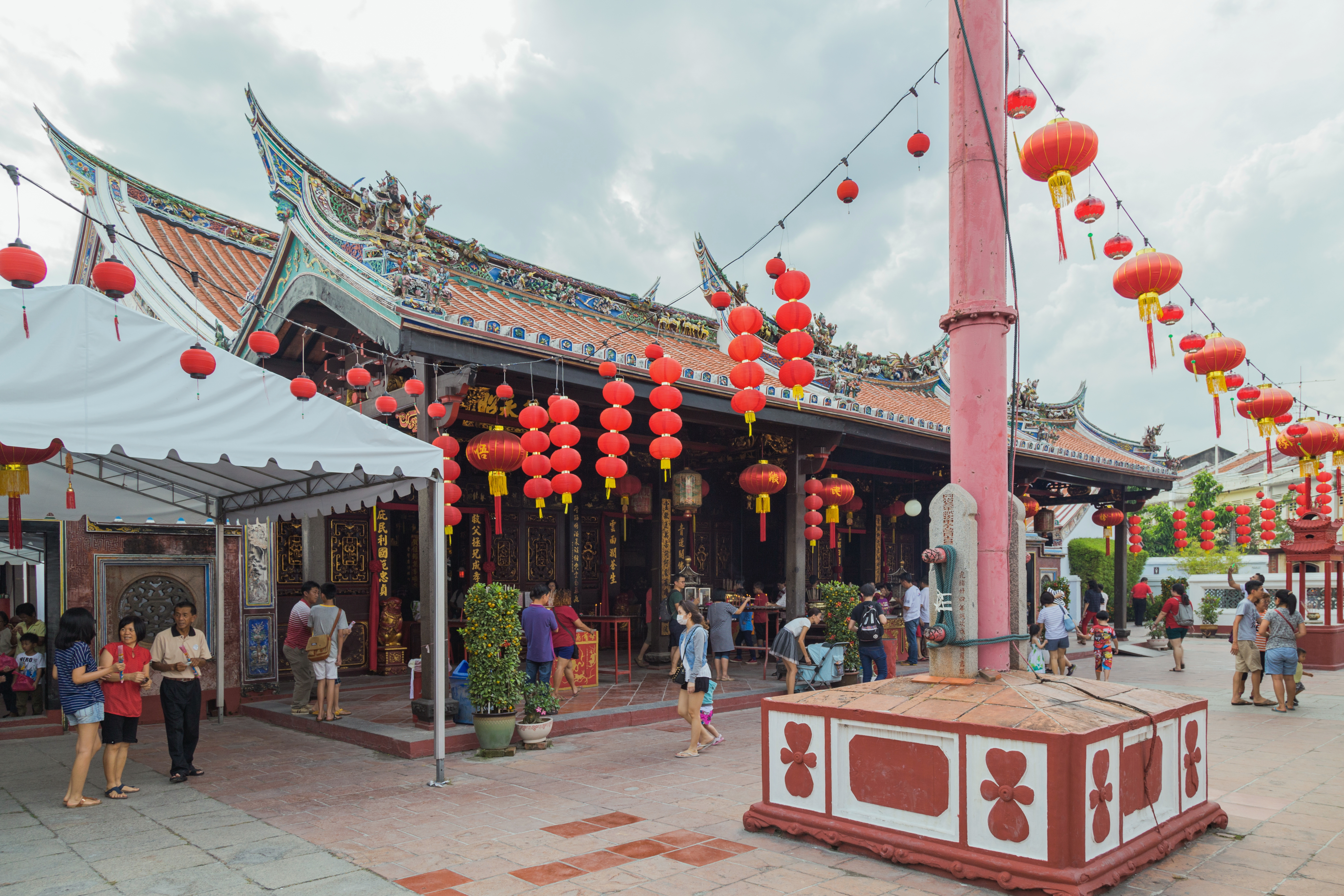
- Front view of Cheng Hoon Teng Temple

Religion
- Affiliation: Buddhism, Confucianism, Taoism

Location
- Location: Malacca City
- State: Malacca
- Country: Malaysia
- Interactive map of Cheng Hoon Teng Temple
- Coordinates: 2°11′50.9″N 102°14′48.7″E

Architecture
- Type: Chinese temple
- Established: 1645

Website
- www.chenghoonteng.org.my

Cheng Hoon Teng Temple
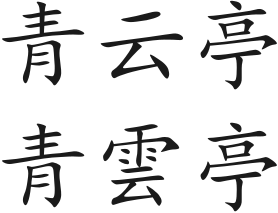
- Cheng Hoon Teng Temple in Simplified Chinese (top) and Traditional Chinese character (bottom)
- Traditional Chinese: 青雲亭
- Simplified Chinese: 青云亭
Transcriptions
Standard Mandarin
- Hanyu Pinyin: Qīngyún Tíng

The Cheng Hoon Teng Temple (Chinese: 青云亭; Pe̍h-ōe-jī: Chheng-hûn-tîng) (also called as the Temple of Green Cloud) is a Chinese temple practising the Three Doctrinal Systems of Buddhism, Confucianism and Taoism located at No. 25 Jalan Tokong, Malacca City, Malaysia. It is the oldest functioning temple in the country.

== History ==
The temple site was founded during the era of Dutch Malacca by the Chinese Kapitans Tay Kie Ki Tay Hong Yong in 1645. There are some controversy about the exact time the temple was built. Inscription in the temple recorded the Ming Dynasty calendar Wanli Reign period 28 years might proved the building might be already been there since 1600 or earlier in the 15th Century. Additional structures were then constructed in 1673 under the leadership of Kapitan Li Wei King Koon Chang with materials imported from China. The temple served as the main place of worship for the local Hoklo (Hokkien) community. Kapitan Chan Ki Lock constructed a main hall for the temple in 1704. In 1801, the temple structures were renovated under the leadership of Kapitan Chua Su Cheong Tok Ping who was the father of Choa Chong Long, the first Kapitan of Singapore, with the addition of additional structures.

In 1962, then abbot Seck Kim Seng ordained Houn Jiyu-Kennett, a Zen nun from England and the future founder of the Order of Buddhist Contemplatives, at this temple. The temple was awarded a UNESCO award for outstanding architectural restoration in 2003.

== Features ==
The temple is situated close to Jalan Tukang Emas, also known as "Harmony Street" because of its proximity to the Kampung Kling Mosque and Sri Poyatha Moorthi Temple, covering an area of 4,600 m^{2}. Featuring a magnificent main gate along Jalan Tokong, the temple consists of a complex of several prayer halls with a large main prayer hall dedicated to the goddess of mercy, Guan Yin. Additional smaller prayer quarters were added later. One of these is dedicated to the Chinese deities of wealth, longevity and propagation, while another dedicated to ancestral tablets. One of the main features of the temple is a pair of seven-metre-tall red flagpoles standing on either side in front of the main prayer hall, an uncommon sight in temple architecture. Across the road is a traditional opera theatre which forms a part of the temple complex. The building conforms to the principles of feng shui where the complex is laid out to ensure a view of the river and high ground on either side.

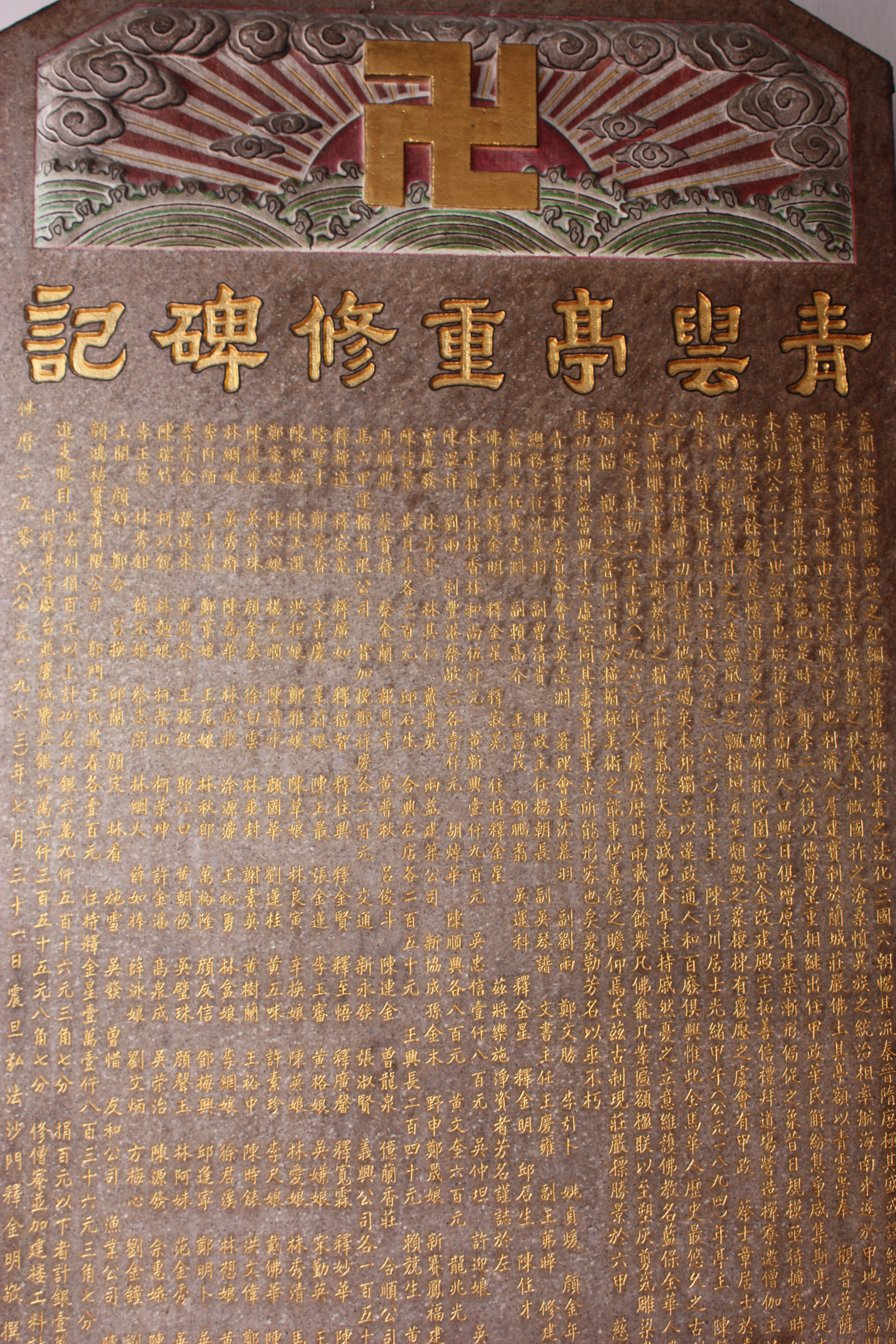
An inscription in Chinese characters inside the temple.

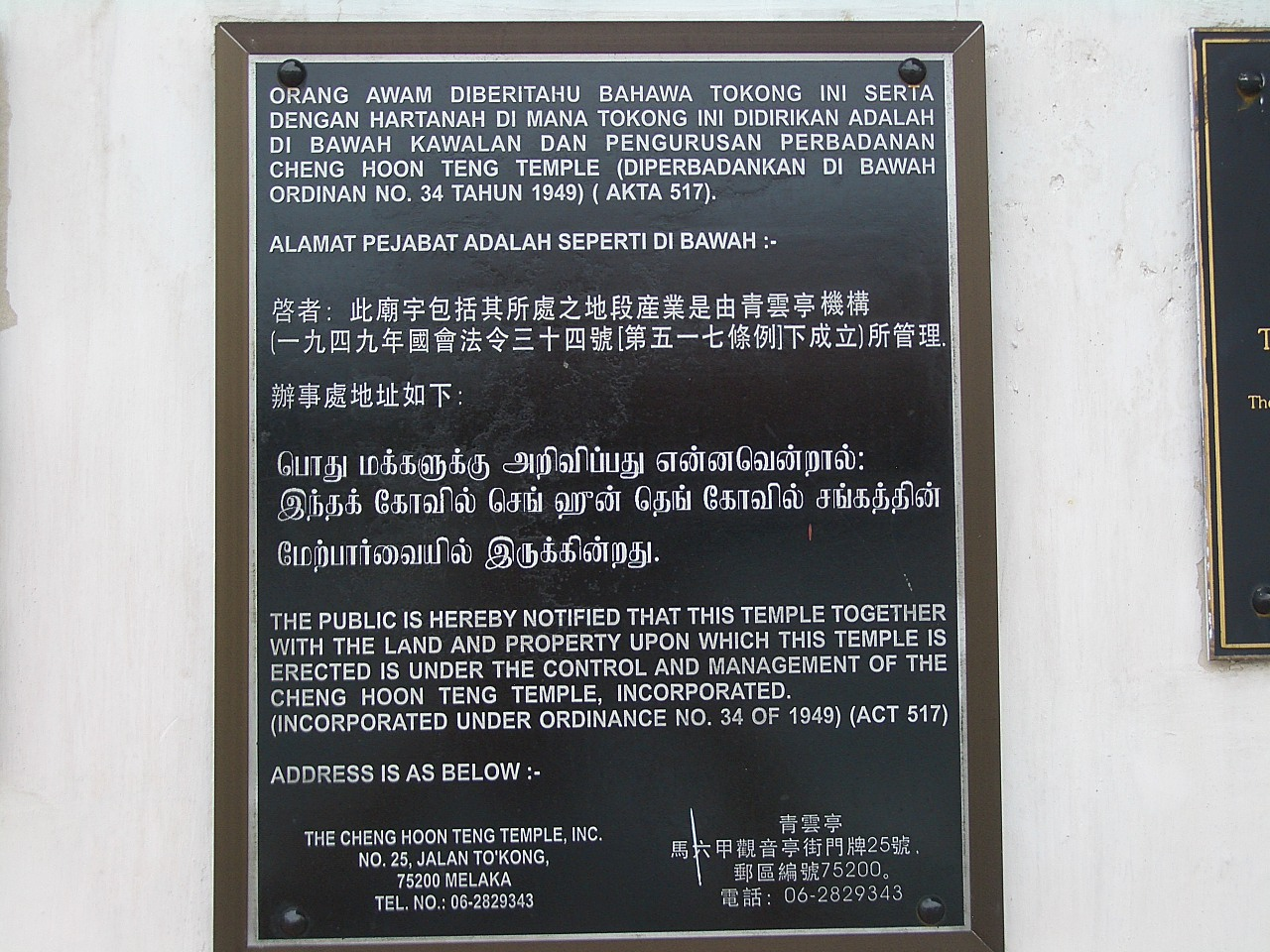
Information plate about the temple.

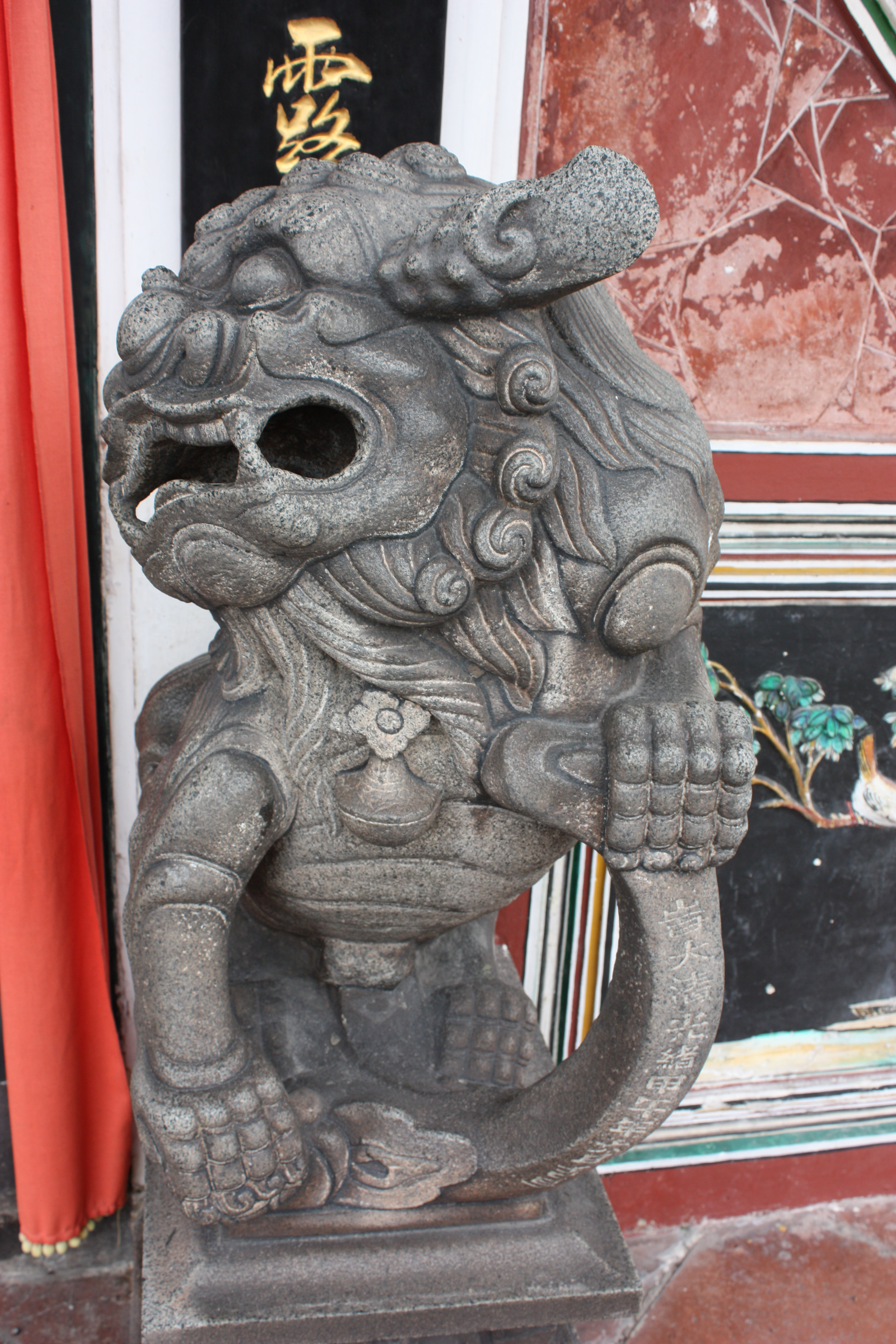
One of the stone statue guarding the temple.

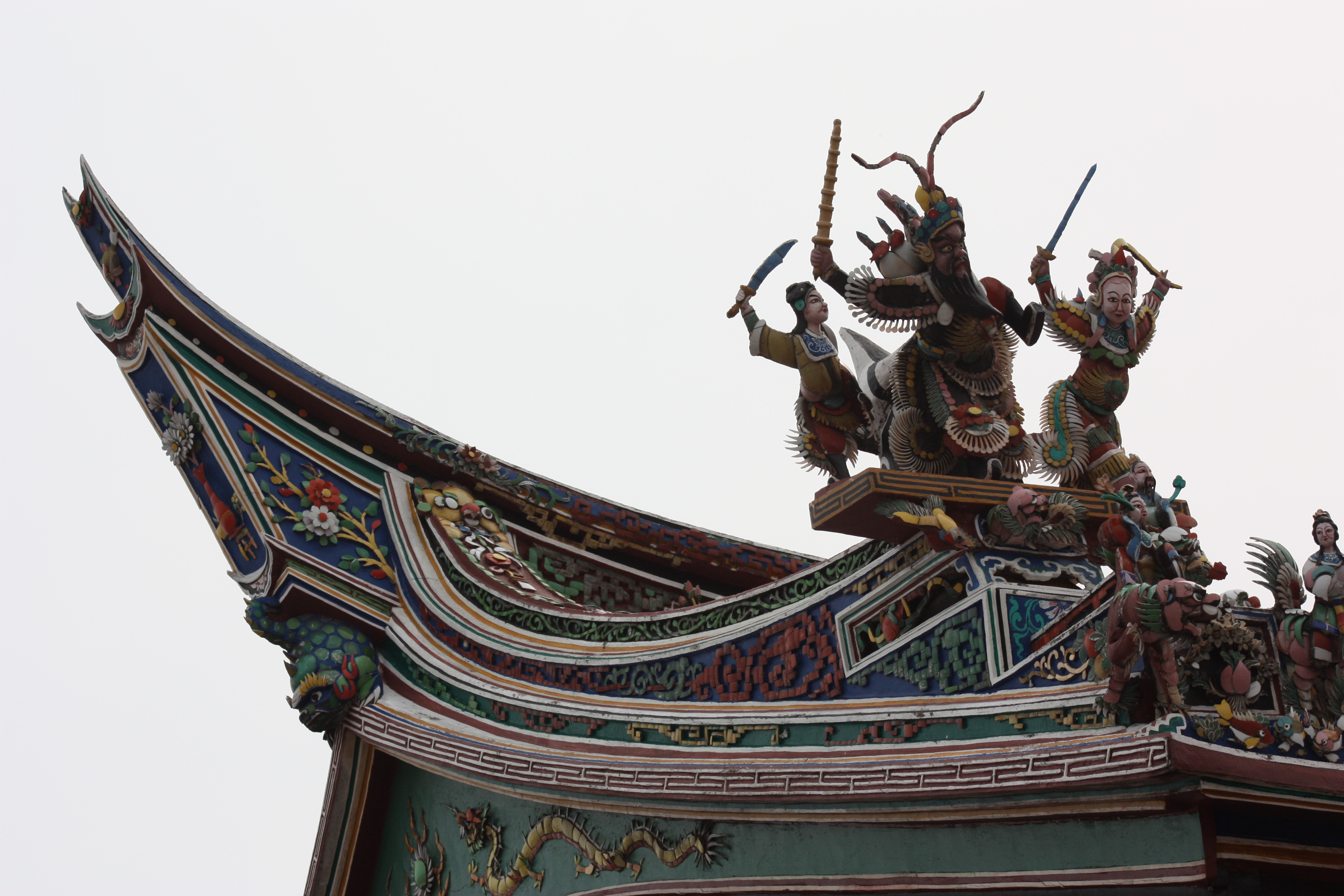
Roofing art.

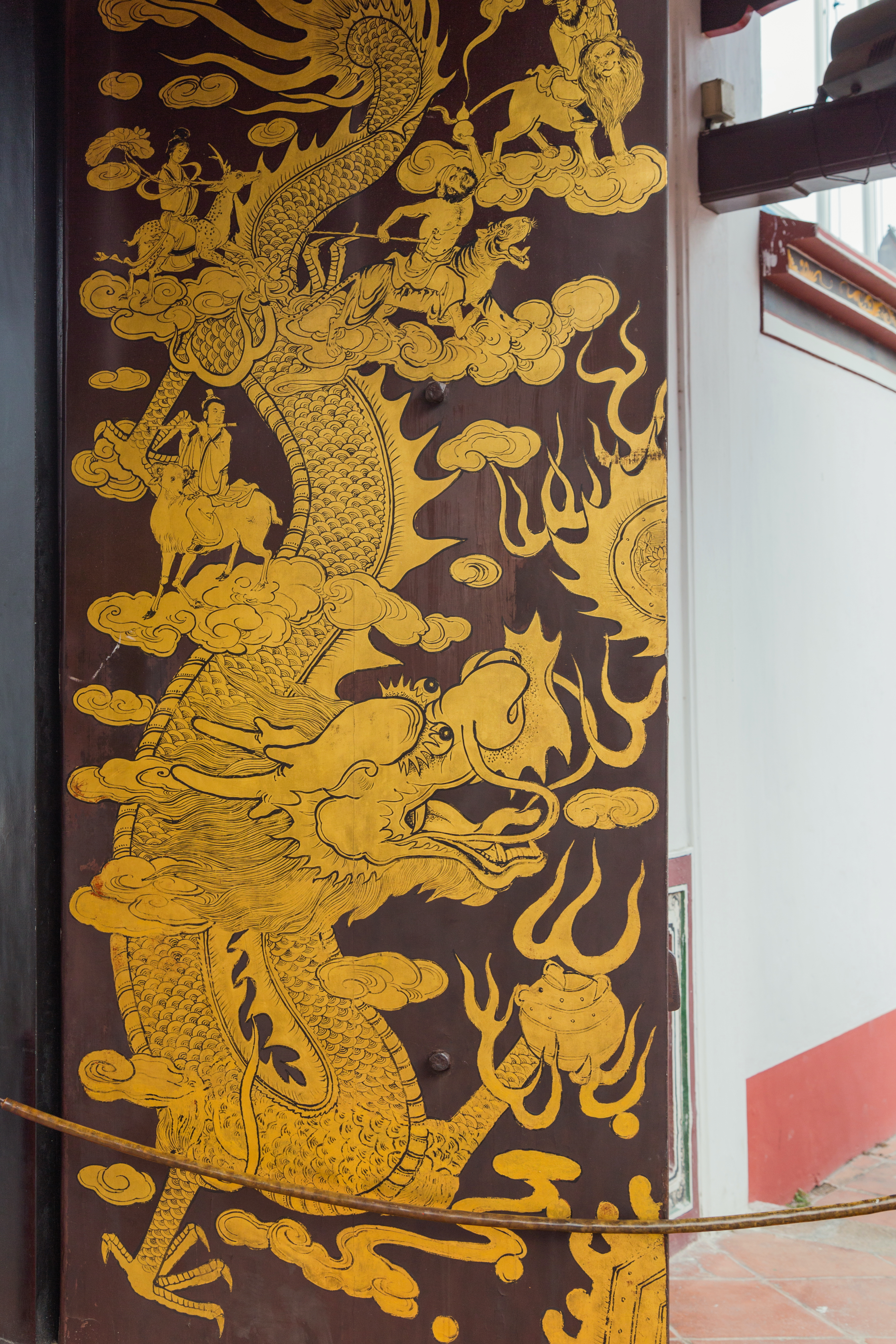
The temple door painting.

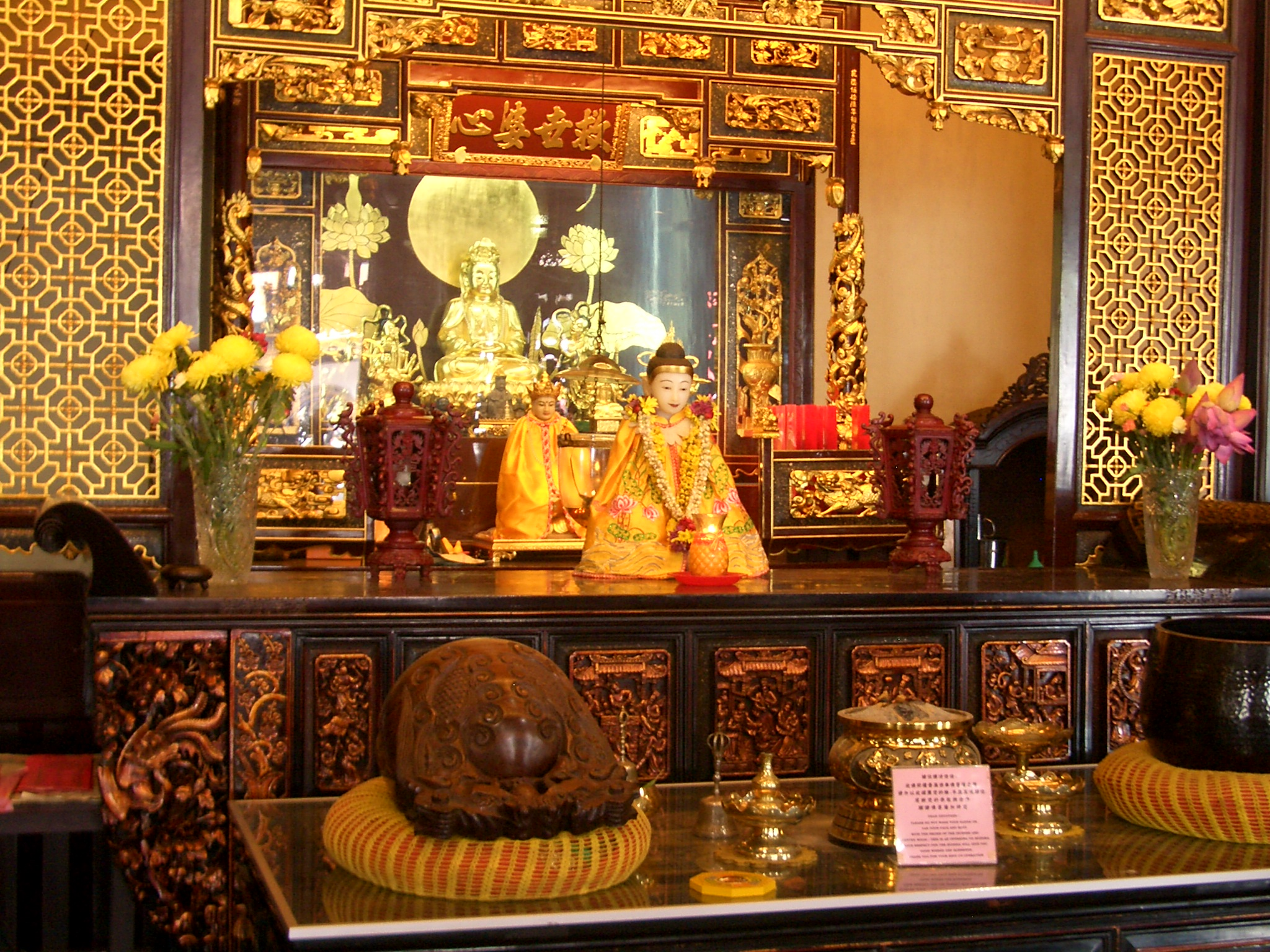
The temple prayer hall.

== See also ==
- Poh San Teng Temple
- Xiang Lin Si Temple
- List of tourist attractions in Malacca
