= Kampung Kling Mosque =

Mosque in Melaka Tengah, Malacca, Malaysia

Kampong Kling Mosque
- Masjid Kampung Kling
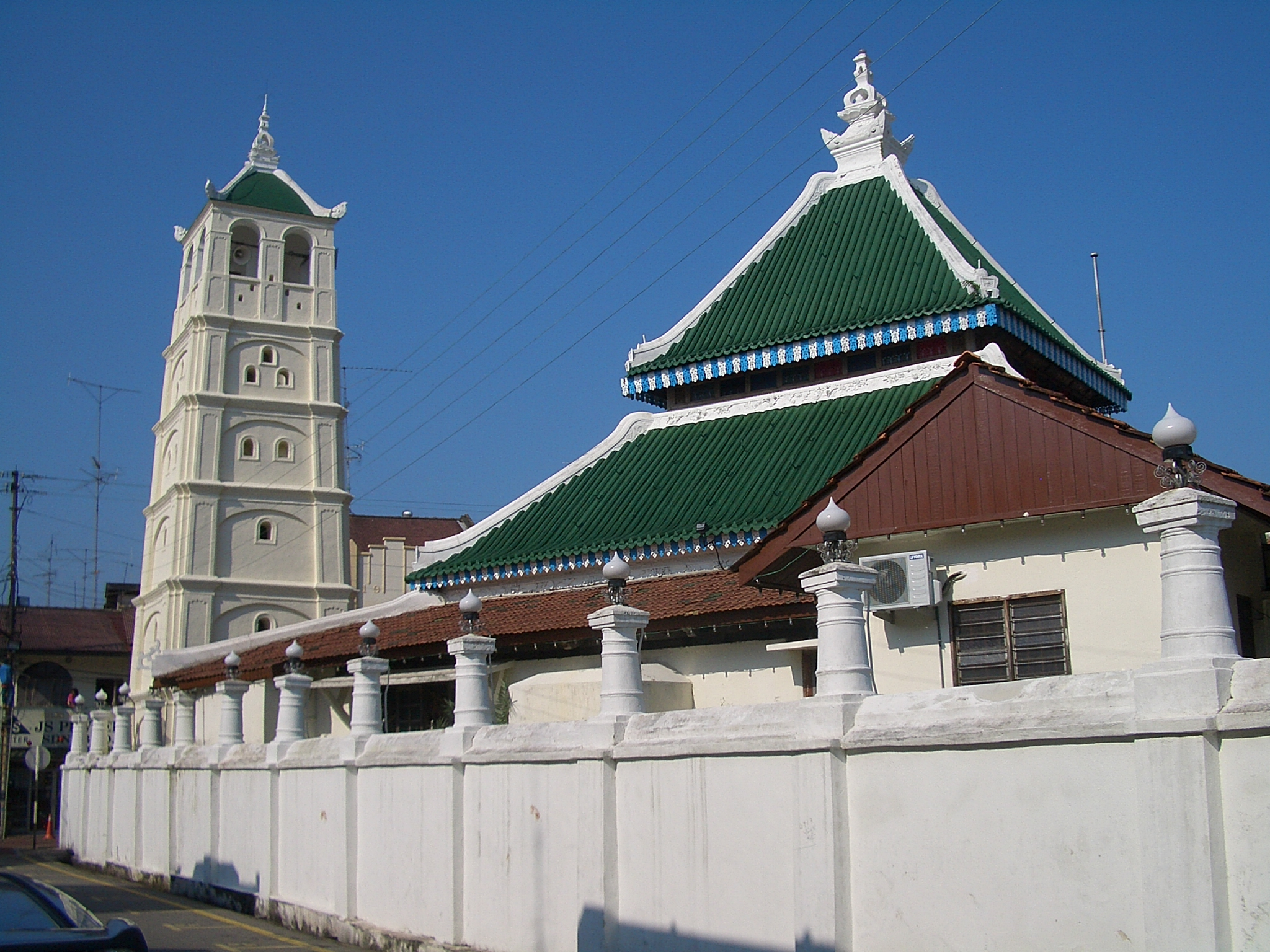

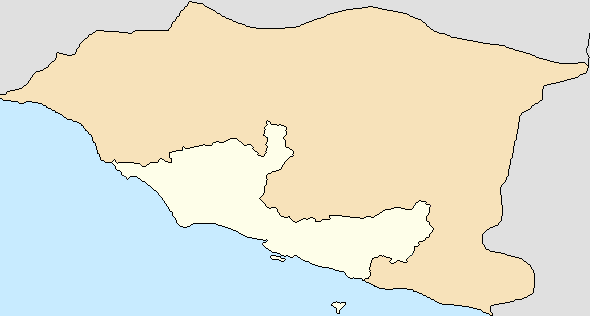
- Location within Malacca City

Religion
- Affiliation: Islam
- Branch/tradition: Sunni

Location
- Location: Malacca City, Malacca, Malaysia
- Coordinates: 2°11′48″N 102°14′51″E

Architecture
- Type: Mosque
- Established: 1748

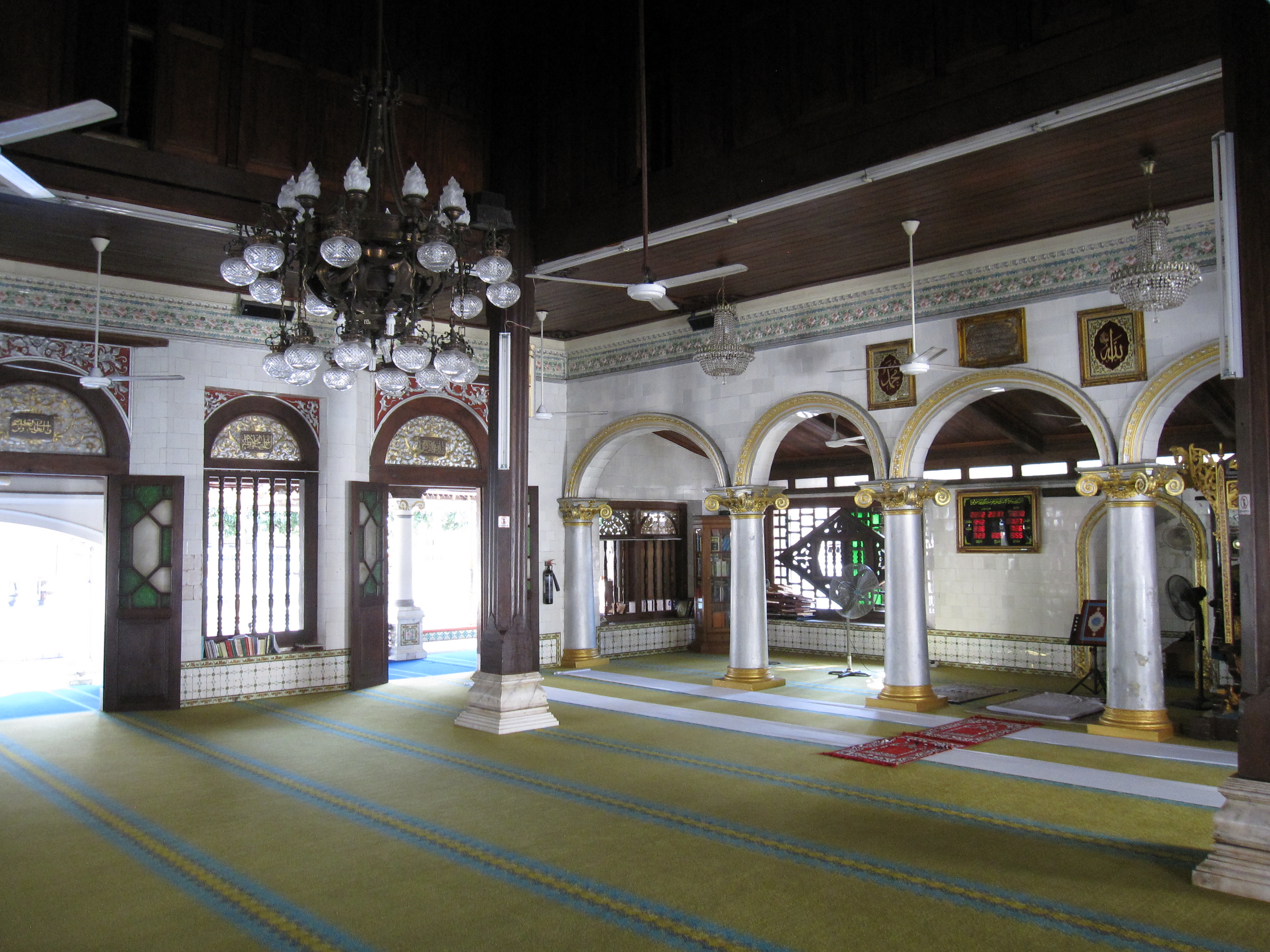
Kampong Kling Mosque prayer hall

Kampong Kling Mosque (sometimes also spelt Kampong Keling Mosque; Malay: Masjid Kampung Kling; Jawi: مسجد كامڤوڠ كليڠ) is a mosque in Malacca City, Malacca, Malaysia. Established in 1748, it is one of the oldest mosques on the Malay Peninsula. It is situated at Jalan Tukang Emas (Goldsmith Street), also known as "Harmony Street" because of its proximity to the Sri Poyatha Moorthi Temple and Cheng Hoon Teng Temple.

The original structure built by Indian Muslim traders in 1748 was a wooden building and in 1872, it was rebuilt with bricks. The mosque is one of the traditional mosques in Malacca, which still retains its original design. The architectural design of the mosque is a cross between Sumatran, Chinese, Hindu, and the local Malays. The minaret (resembles a pagoda), ablution pool and entrance arch were built at the same time with the main building. The Kampung Kling Mosque is named based on a village which Indian traders dwell called Kampung Kling.

The mosque also has a blend of English and Portuguese glazed tiles, Ionic columns with symmetrical arches in the main prayer hall, a Victorian chandelier, a wooden pulpit with Hindu and Chinese-style carvings, and Moorish cast iron lamp-posts in the place of ablution for pre-prayer cleansing. The Department of Museums and Antiquities completed conservation works on the mosque in the 1990s.

== See also ==
- Islam in Malaysia
- Keling, a currently derogatory term used in the naming of the mosque
