= Ipoh =

- State capital city
- City of Ipoh Bandaraya Ipoh (Malay)
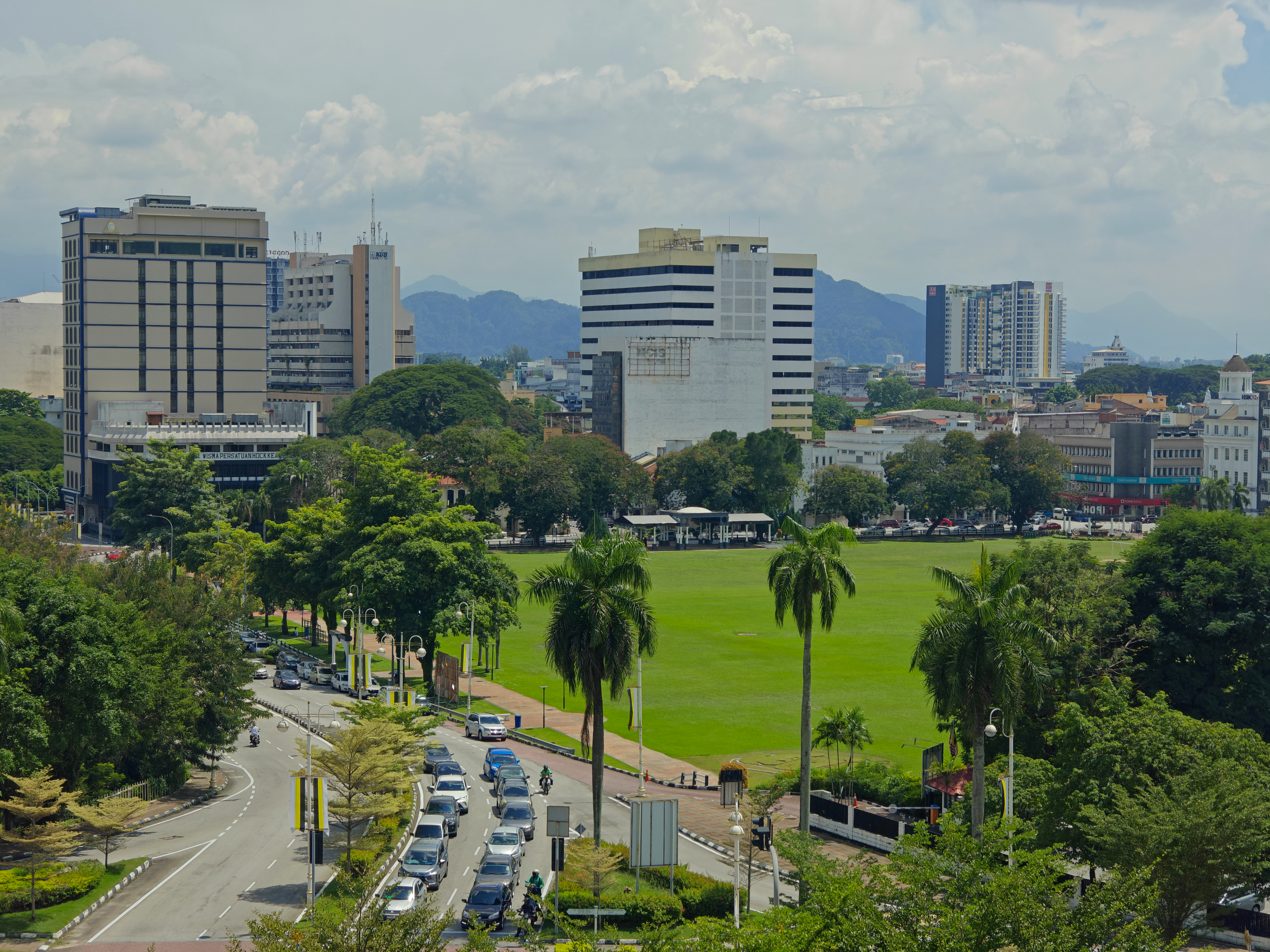
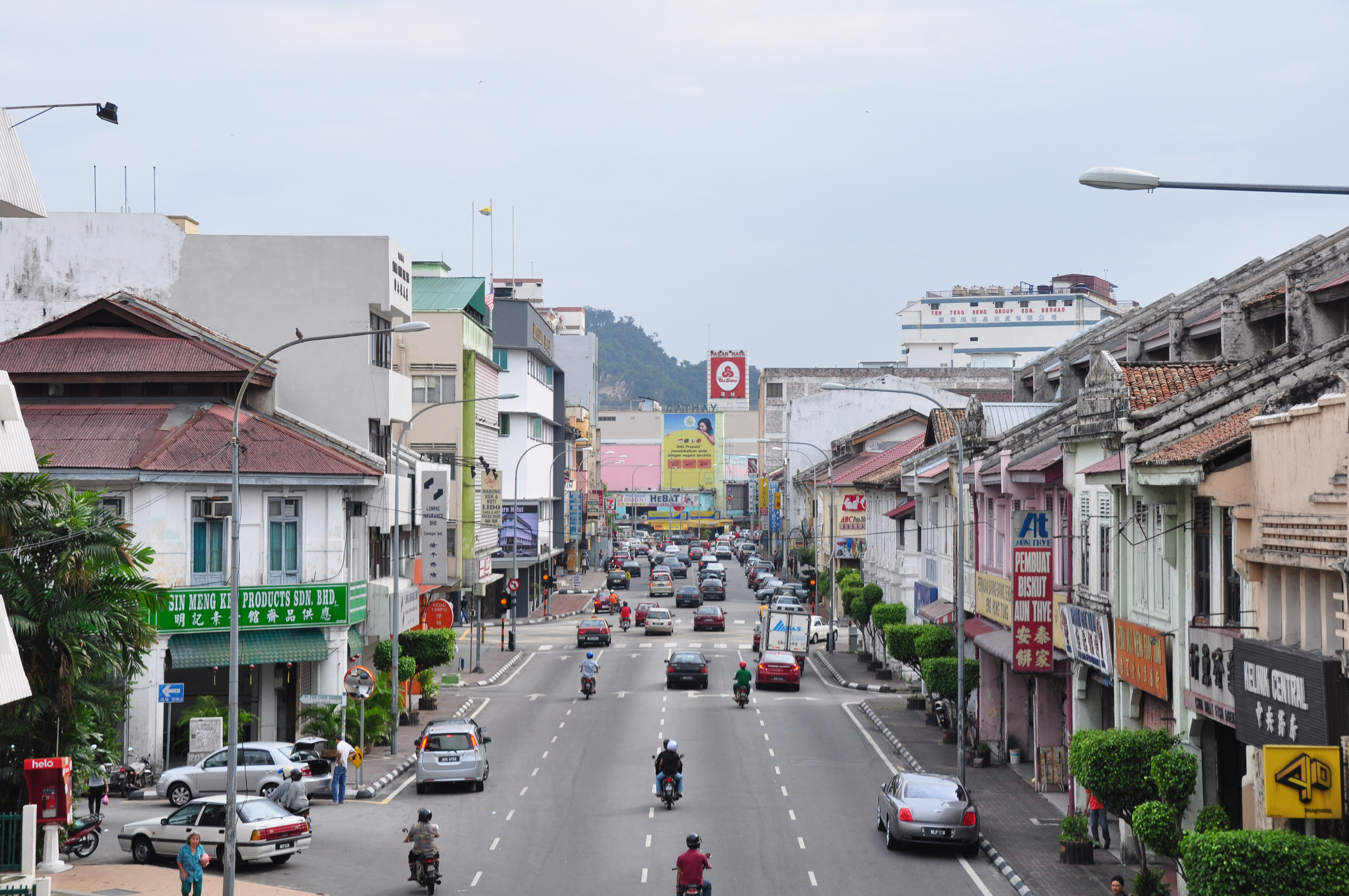
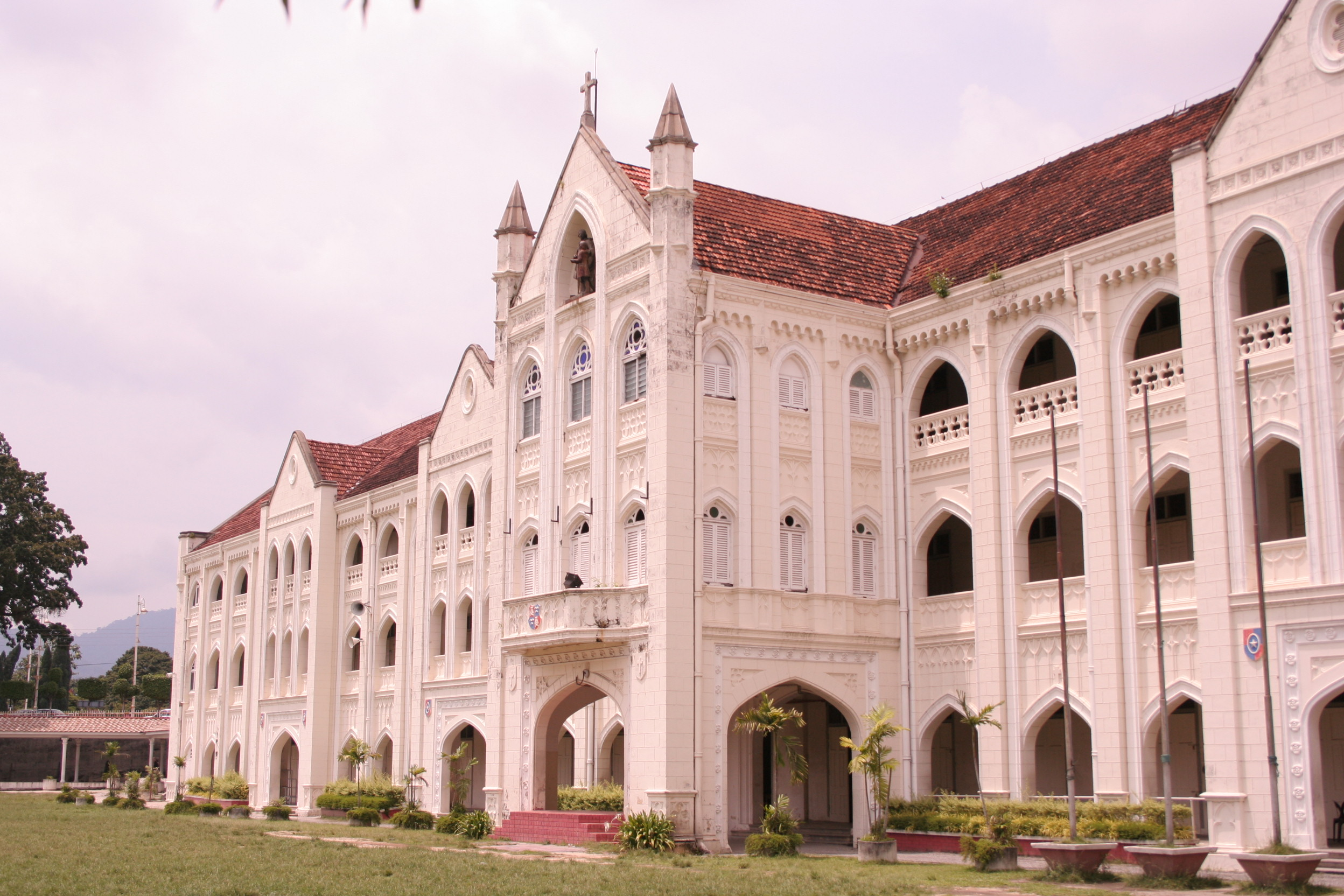
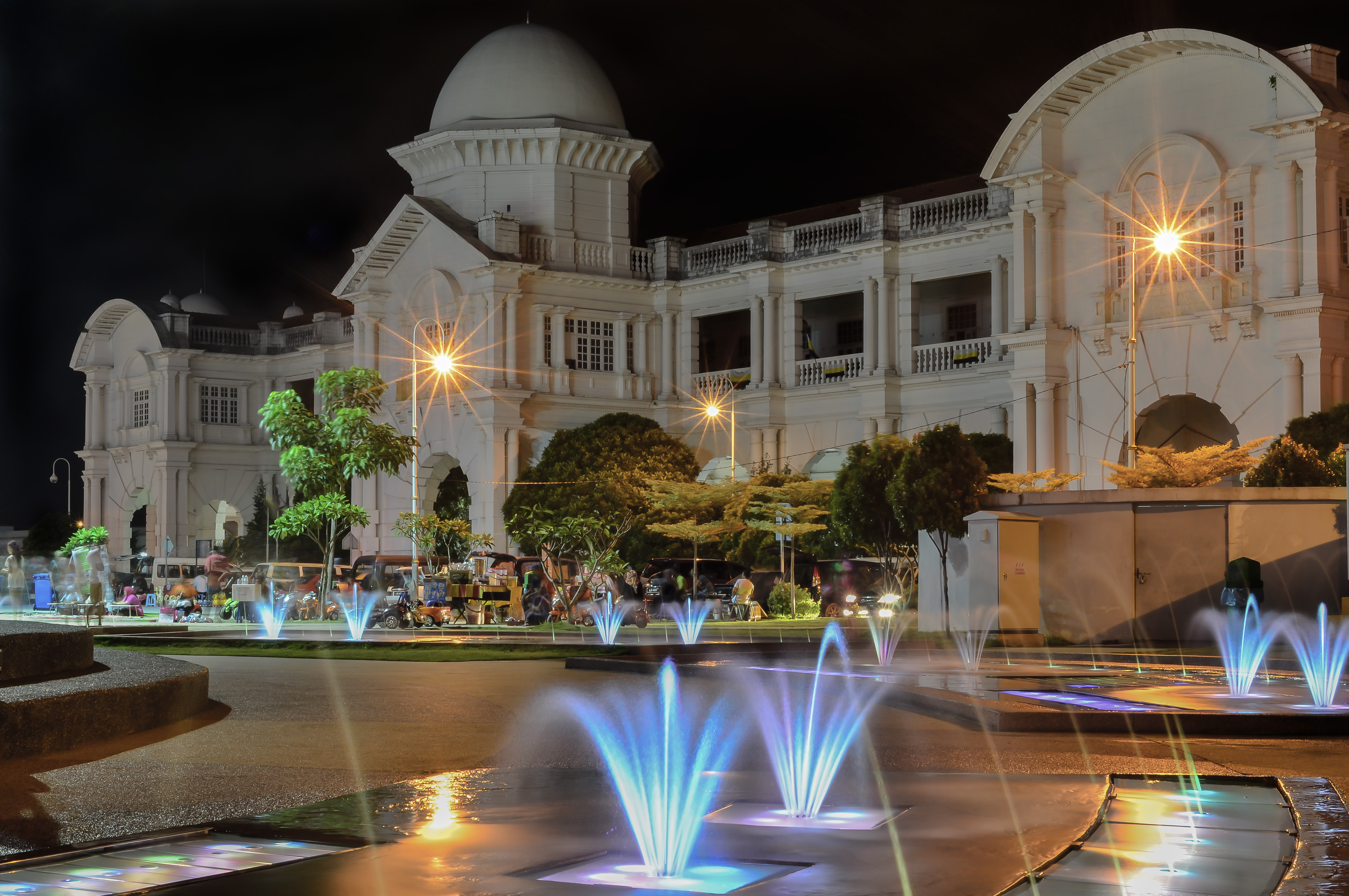
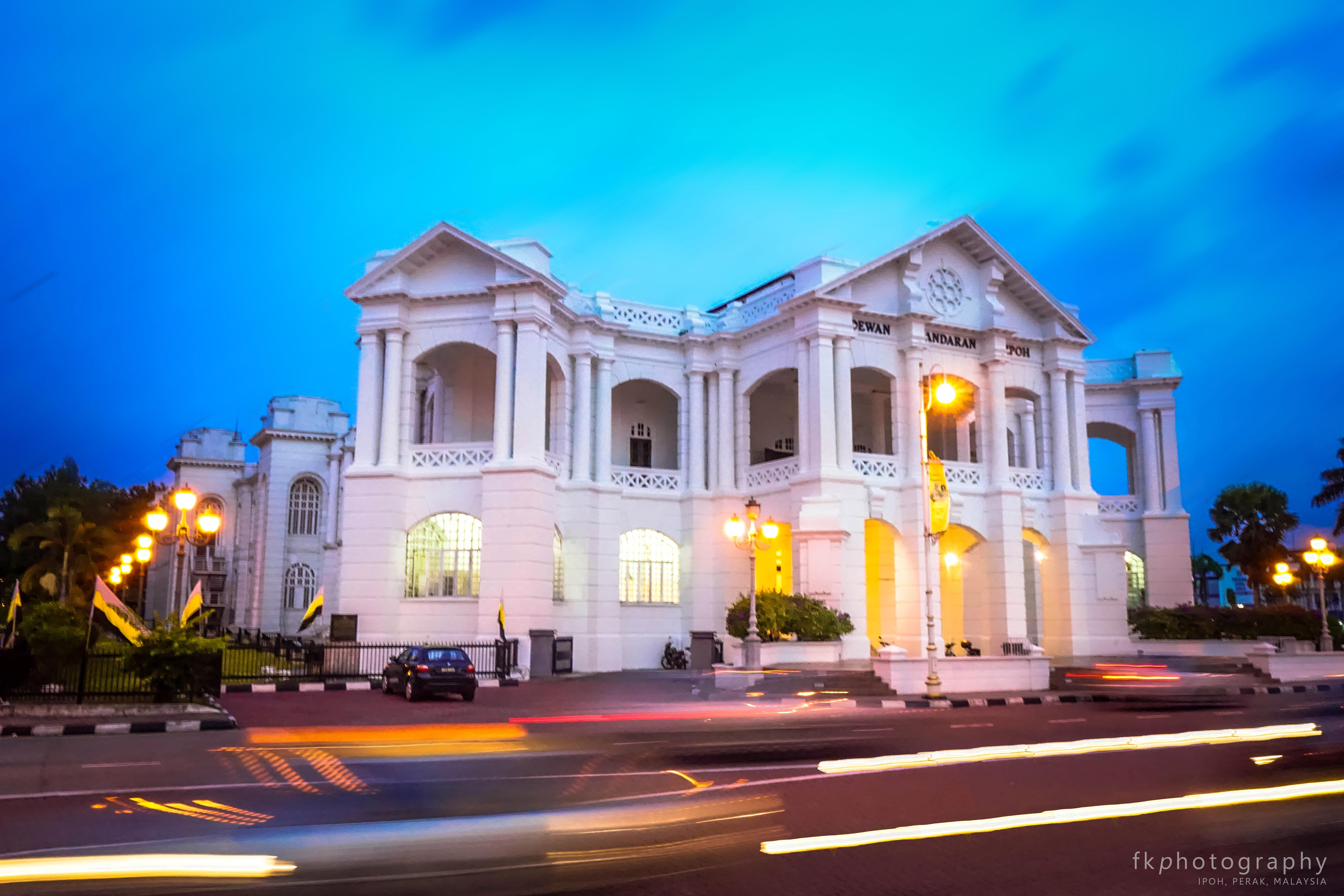
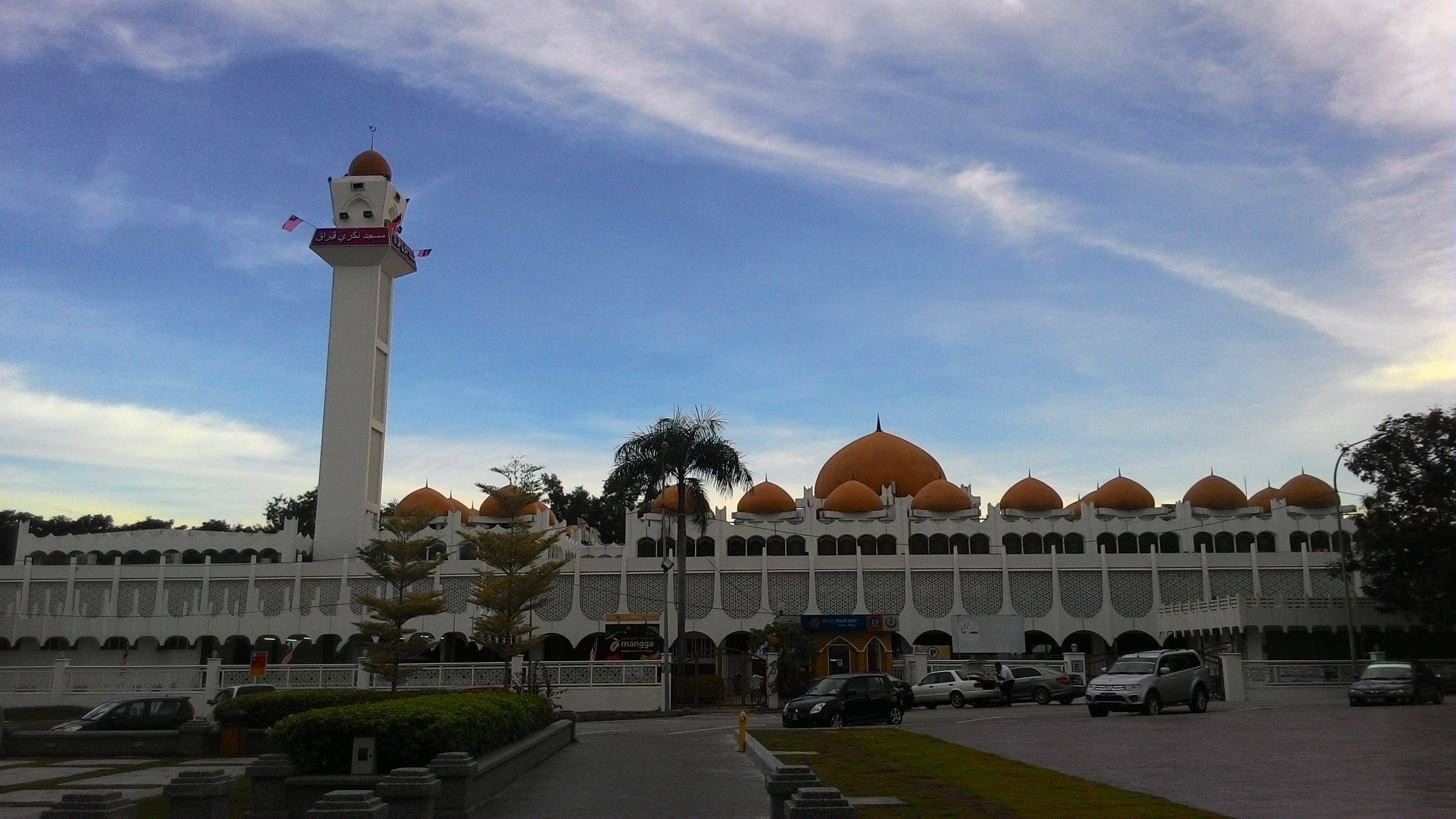
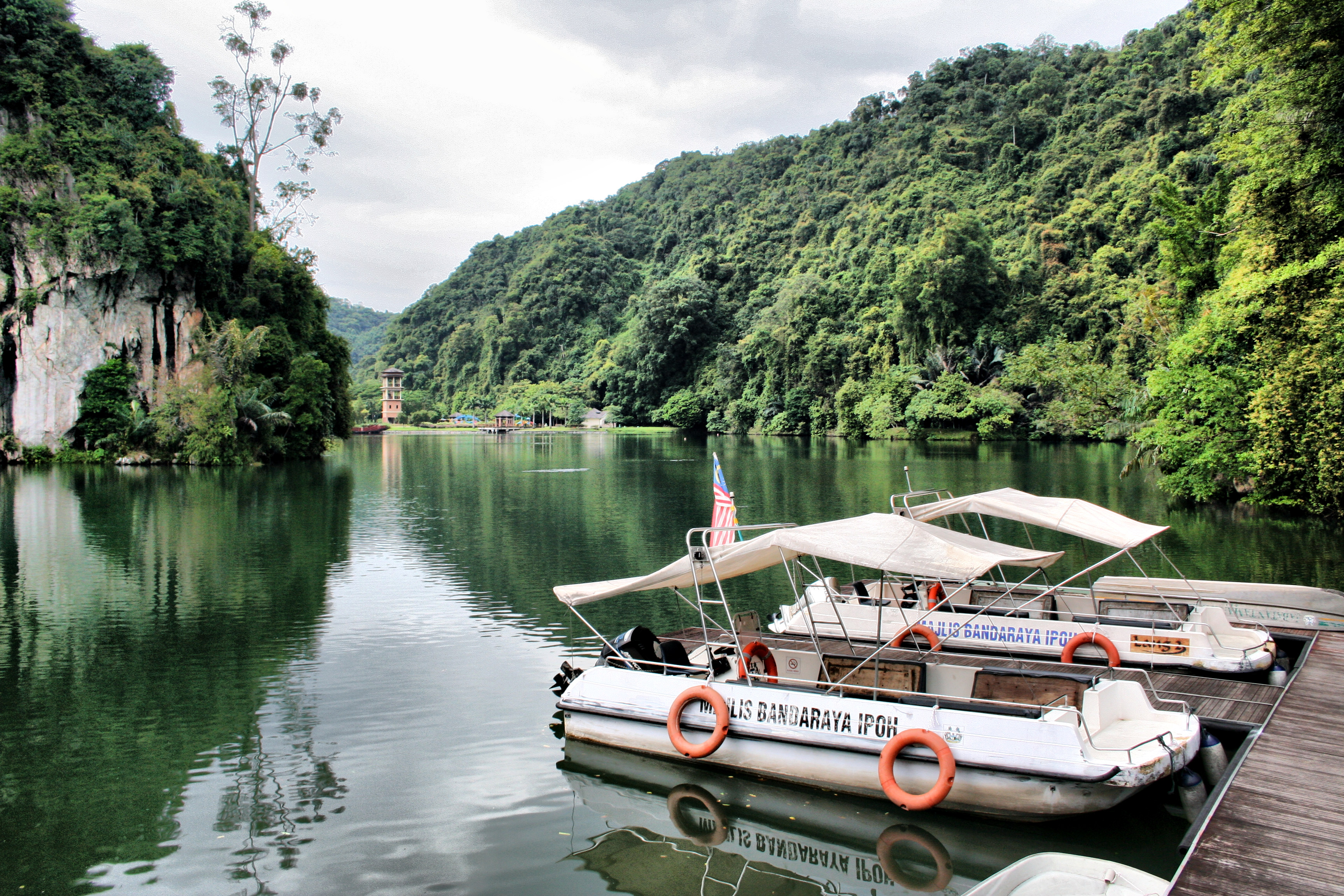
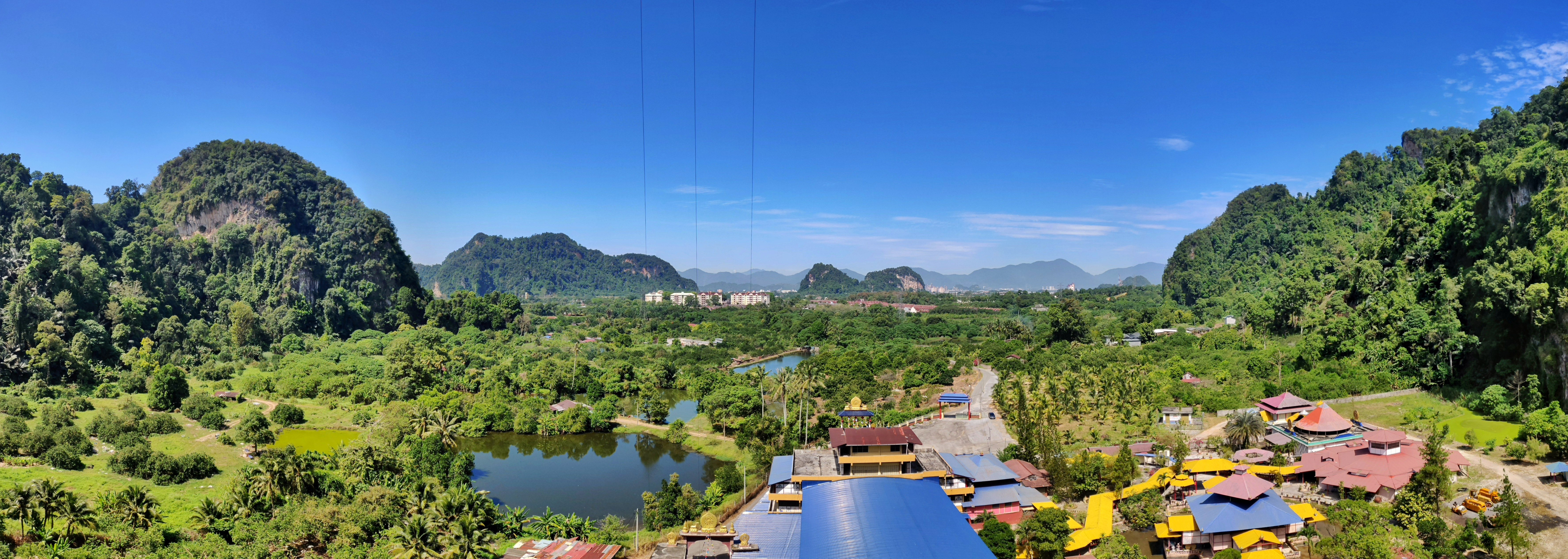
- City skyline Old downtown St. Michael's Institution Ipoh railway station Ipoh Town Hall Sultan Idris Shah II Mosque Gunung Lang Recreational Park Karst topography at Tambun

- Flag Seal
- Nicknames: City of Millionaires, Bougainvillea City, Mountain City, Silver Valley
- Motto(s): Berkhidmat dan Maju; English: Service and Progress
- Interactive map of Ipoh
- Ipoh in Perak Ipoh (Malaysia) Ipoh (Asia) Ipoh (Earth)
- Coordinates: 04°35′50″N 101°04′30″E
- Country: Malaysia
- State: Perak
- District: Kinta
- Establishment: Around 1880; 146 years ago
- Establishment of the local government: 1893; 133 years ago
- Municipality status: May 31, 1962; 64 years ago
- City status: 27 May 1988; 38 years ago

Government
  - Type: City council
  - Body: Ipoh City Council
  - Mayor: Rumaizi Baharin

Area
  - Total: 643 km^{2} (248 sq mi)
- Elevation: 51.85 m (170.1 ft)

Population (2020)
  - Total: 759,952
  - Density: 1,180/km^{2} (3,060/sq mi)
- Demonym: Ipohian / Ipohite
- Time zone: UTC+8 (MST)
  - Summer (DST): Not observed
- Postcode: 30xxx, 31xxx
- Area code: 05
- Website: mbi.gov.my

Ipoh (/ˈiːpoʊ/, Malay pronunciation: [ipoh]) is the capital city of the Malaysian state of Perak. Located on the Kinta River, it is nearly 200 km (120 mi) north of Kuala Lumpur and 150 km (93 mi) southeast of George Town in neighbouring Penang. As of the 2020 census, Ipoh had a population of 759,952, making it the ninth-largest city in Malaysia by population and the fourth most populous state capital, after Johor Bahru, Shah Alam and George Town.

In recent years, Ipoh's popularity as an international tourist destination has been significantly boosted by efforts to conserve its British colonial-era architecture. The city is also well known for its cuisine and natural attractions including limestone hills and caves within which Buddhist temples were built.

Ipoh's location between Kuala Lumpur and George Town has made it a major land transportation hub within West Malaysia, with both the Malayan Railway's West Coast Line and the North-South Expressway cutting through the city. Aside from land transportation, Ipoh is served by the Sultan Azlan Shah Airport.

== Etymology ==
The name Ipoh is derived from the Malay name of Antiaris toxicaria (pokok ipoh) which grows locally. The sap of this plant, which is poisonous, was mixed with Strychnos latex by Aslians to coat the tips of their blowpipe darts for hunting.

== History ==
Originally a village, Ipoh began to grow rapidly in the 1880s after huge deposits of tin were discovered within its vicinity. Its geographic location in the rich tin-bearing valley of the Kinta River made it a natural centre of growth.

The Great Fire of Ipoh in 1892 destroyed over half the town, but also presented an opportunity to rebuild the town in a more orderly grid pattern. By 1895, it was the second largest town within the Federated Malay States, which also consisted of Selangor, Negeri Sembilan, and Pahang. Ipoh was then rebuilt in time for the second tin rush and grew rapidly as a result of the booming tin mining industry, particularly in the 1920s and 1930s.

A local Hakka miner, millionaire Yau Tet Shin, started developing a large tract of the town in the early 1930s, today known as the "New Town", from the eastern bank of the Kinta River to Greentown. In 1937, Ipoh was made the capital of Perak, replacing Taiping.

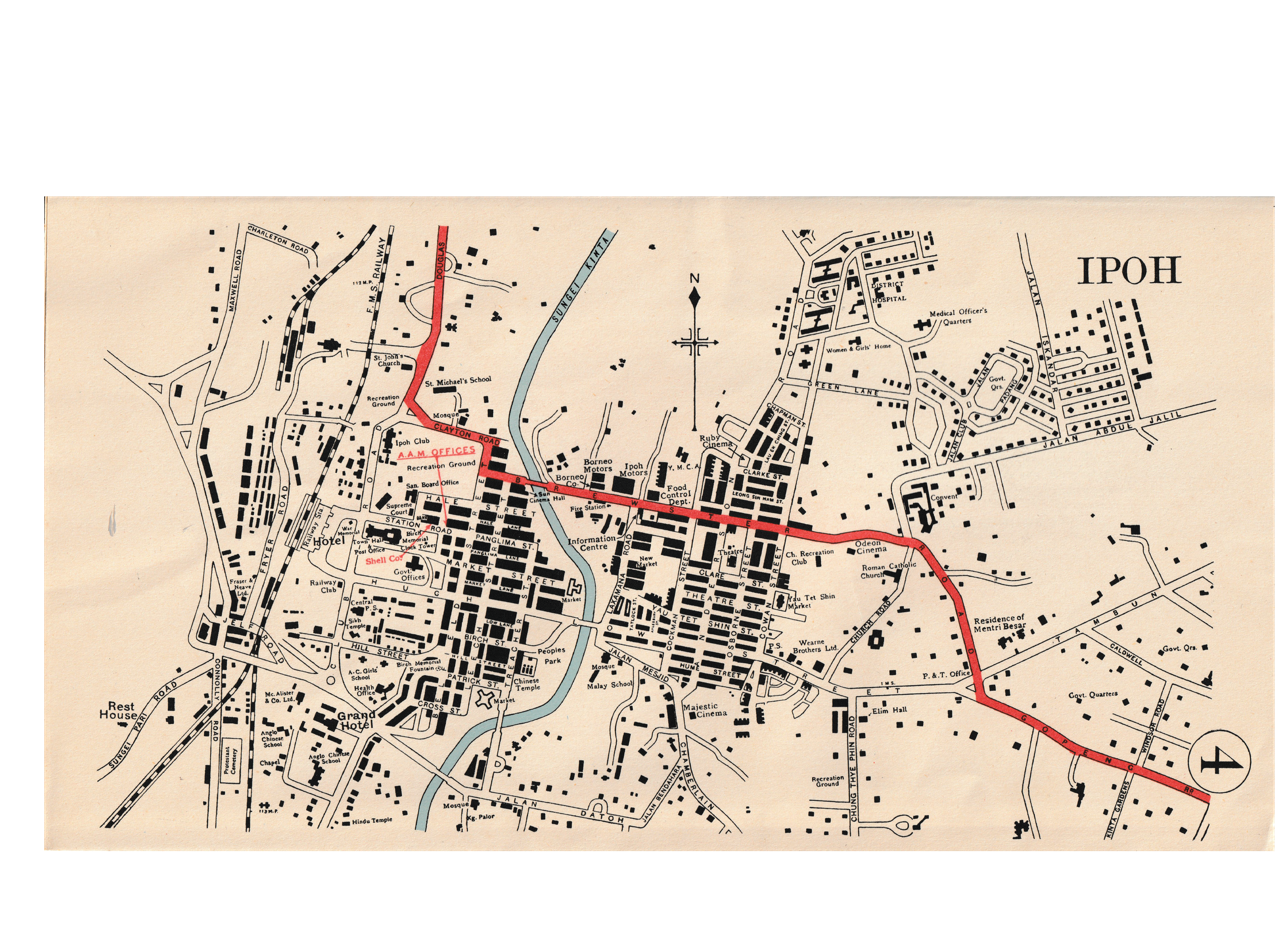
Map of Ipoh, Perak in 1951

Ipoh was invaded by the Japanese on 15 December 1941. In March 1942, the Japanese Civil Administration or Perak Shu Seicho was set up at St. Michael's Institution. After the liberation of Malaya by British forces, Ipoh remained the capital of Perak as it does to this day. After depletion of its tin deposits and the collapse of tin prices in the 1970s, the city suffered decades of decline and neglect. With the closure of the tin mines, its urban population was forced to seek employment in other cities within Malaysia. In spite of this, Ipoh remains one of the largest cities in Malaysia in terms of population, with tourism now a main driver of the city's economy.

Ipoh gained municipal status in 1962, and in 1988 it was declared a city by the Sultan of Perak, Sultan Azlan Shah.

== Geography ==
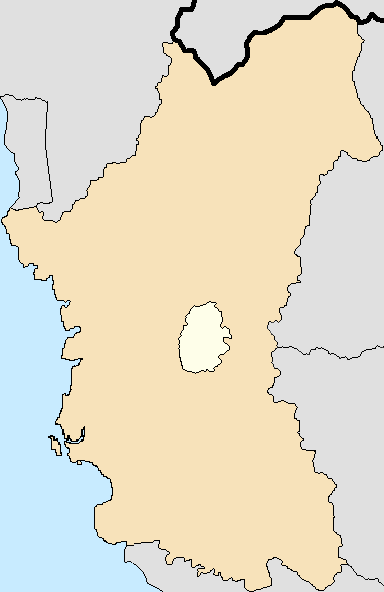
Locations of Ipoh and its suburbs

=== Topography ===
Ipoh is in the state of Perak, which is in the central part of Peninsular Malaysia. The city is in the middle of the karstic Kinta Valley region, on the bank of the Kinta River and the confluence of the smaller rivers Sungai Pinji and Sungai Pari. Hills of limestone, called mogotes, surround the city, which can be found around suburban areas to the northeast, east and southeast.

The Keledang mountain range stretches from the north to the west of the city. This range runs parallel to the Bintang mountain range with the Perak River running on its left bank and the Kinta River to its right. This range is interrupted to the north of Ipoh by a tributary of the Perak River called the Pelus River, which is sourced from the Titiwangsa mountain range, which runs to the east of Ipoh.

=== Climate ===
Ipoh has a tropical rainforest climate. Ipoh is more subject to the Intertropical Convergence Zone than the trade winds and very rarely has cyclones, therefore it can be described as having an equatorial climate. The city's temperature shows little variation throughout the year, the average temperature being 28 °C (82 °F). Ipoh sees high precipitation throughout the year with an average of 200 mm (7.9 in) of rain each month and averaging 2,897.0 mm (114.06 in) of rain per year. The wettest month is October when on average 307.1 mm (12.09 in) of rain falls. Ipoh's driest month is January which has 132.3 mm (5.21 in) of rainfall on average.

Climate data for Ipoh (Sultan Azlan Shah Airport) (2007–2020 normals, extremes 2015–present)
Month	Jan	Feb	Mar	Apr	May	Jun	Jul	Aug	Sep	Oct	Nov	Dec	Year
Record high °C (°F)	36.4 (97.5)	36.6 (97.9)	37.0 (98.6)	37.3 (99.1)	36.2 (97.2)	36.9 (98.4)	36.6 (97.9)	36.2 (97.2)	36.9 (98.4)	35.5 (95.9)	35.1 (95.2)	35.3 (95.5)	37.3 (99.1)
Mean daily maximum °C (°F)	32.2 (90.0)	33.0 (91.4)	33.3 (91.9)	32.9 (91.2)	32.8 (91.0)	32.8 (91.0)	32.6 (90.7)	32.5 (90.5)	32.2 (90.0)	32.1 (89.8)	31.4 (88.5)	31.3 (88.3)	32.4 (90.4)
Daily mean °C (°F)	27.9 (82.2)	28.4 (83.1)	28.8 (83.8)	28.7 (83.7)	28.8 (83.8)	28.7 (83.7)	28.6 (83.5)	28.3 (82.9)	28.1 (82.6)	28.1 (82.6)	27.7 (81.9)	27.6 (81.7)	28.3 (83.0)
Mean daily minimum °C (°F)	23.6 (74.5)	23.8 (74.8)	24.3 (75.7)	24.5 (76.1)	24.9 (76.8)	24.7 (76.5)	24.5 (76.1)	24.2 (75.6)	24.1 (75.4)	23.9 (75.0)	24.1 (75.4)	23.9 (75.0)	24.2 (75.6)
Record low °C (°F)	21.7 (71.1)	21.6 (70.9)	22.3 (72.1)	22.2 (72.0)	21.9 (71.4)	22.0 (71.6)	21.9 (71.4)	21.2 (70.2)	21.6 (70.9)	22.4 (72.3)	22.3 (72.1)	22.2 (72.0)	21.2 (70.2)
Average precipitation mm (inches)	132.3 (5.21)	149.8 (5.90)	169.9 (6.69)	259.1 (10.20)	210.9 (8.30)	151.8 (5.98)	156.6 (6.17)	157.8 (6.21)	216.0 (8.50)	297.2 (11.70)	275.4 (10.84)	251.1 (9.89)	2,427.9 (95.59)
Average precipitation days (≥ 1.0 mm)	9	10	12	14	14	10	10	12	15	18	18	15	157
Average relative humidity (%)	80.0	76.7	77.9	82.2	81.6	77.9	77.3	78.3	80.1	82.0	85.1	83.6	80.2
Source 1: IEM (humidity 2012–2023)
Source 2: World Meteorological Organisation (precipitation 1971–2000)Meteomanz (extremes)

=== Limestone caves ===
Mogotes are the most prominent natural features of the city. There are many caves in these outcrops, some of which have cave temples built in them. The Sam Poh Tong Temple is a notable example, along with Kek Lok Tong; Cavern of Utmost Happiness), which lies on the other side of the same outcrop. It is accessible through the Gunung Rapat housing area. Other cave temples in Ipoh include Ling Sen Tong, Nan Tian Tong, Kwan Yin Tong and Perak Tong.

Gua Tempurung, near Gopeng, south of Ipoh, is a show cave open to the public and popular among spelunkers. More than 3 km (1.9 mi) long, it is one of the longest caves in Peninsular Malaysia. Part of it has been developed with electric lighting and walkways, and there are tours of varying lengths and difficulty. A river passage runs about 1.6 km (0.99 mi) through the hill. There are five large chambers, filled with spectacular speleothems which include stalactites and stalagmites.

== Economy ==
In its early history, Ipoh as a settlement was built around its mining industry, although inferior to that of Gopeng, some 19 kilometres (12 mi) to the south. Ipoh was once one of the richest cities in Malaysia and South East Asia, in the days when tin was its major product. During the 1980s, when tin prices collapsed, the economy of Ipoh was affected significantly. However, the city has since experienced economic growth. The city of Ipoh hosts the headquarters of several large multinational corporations, such as: Kuala Lumpur Kepong Berhad, a major palm oil company; Batu Kawan Berhad, an investment company which holds the majority share in Kuala Lumpur Kepong Berhad; Hovid Berhad, a major Malaysian pharmaceutical company; and Old Town White Coffee (or Old Town Berhad), a food and beverage giant originating from Ipoh which specializes in white coffee. Other public listed companies in Ipoh include, Perak Transit Berhad, Tasek Cement Berhad, DKLS Industries Berhad, Wellcall Holding Berhad, Rubberex Berhad, and Perak Corp. Ipoh also hosts the Malaysian headquarters for several foreign multinational companies, including Finisar, Voith, ITL Asia Pacific, and Sagami Manufacturers.

== Governance ==
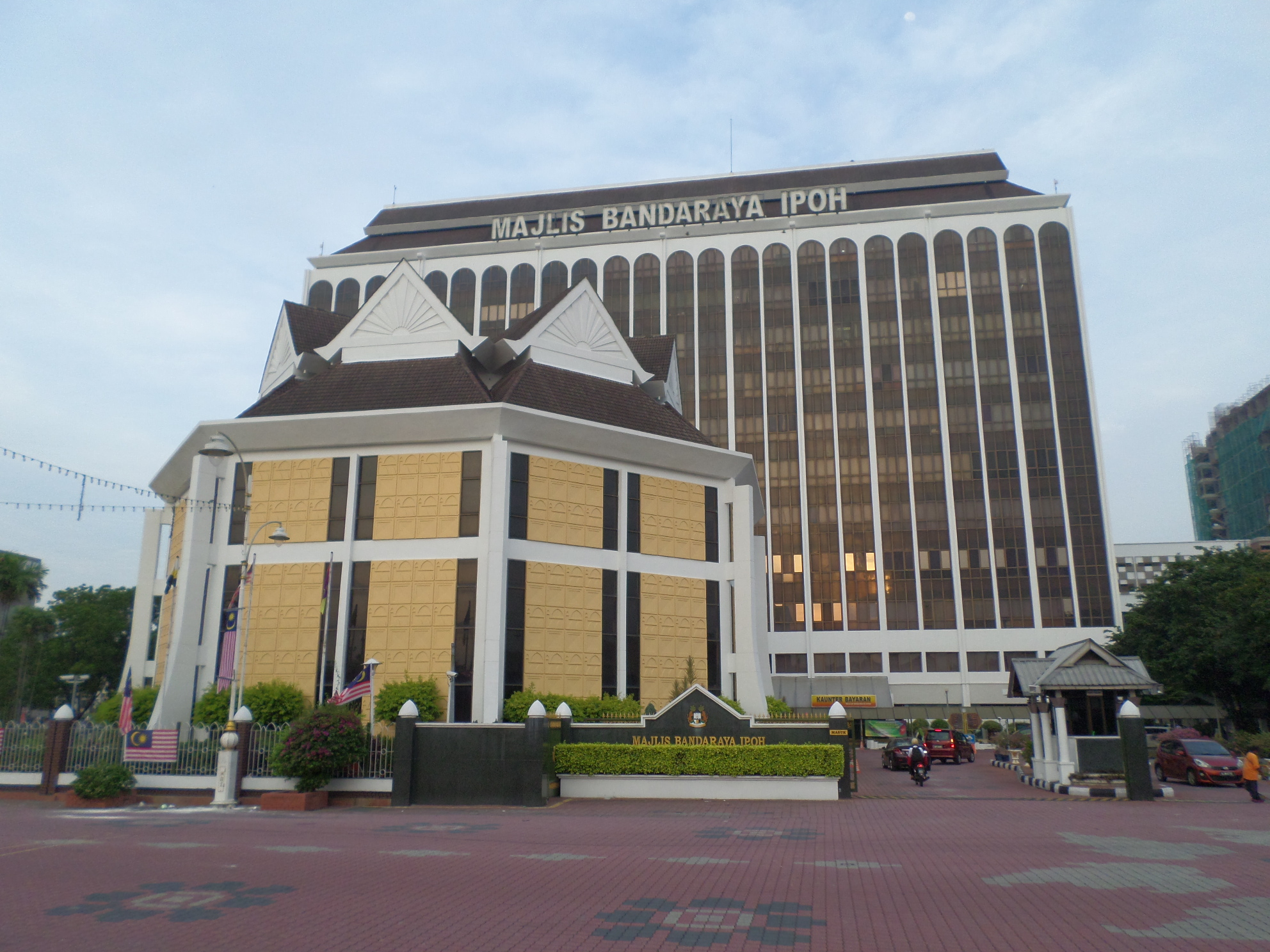
Ipoh City Council

The Ipoh City Council governs the city. Datuk Rumaizi Baharin, appointed in April 2020, is the mayor of Ipoh. Ipoh is divided into two parliamentary constituencies: Ipoh Barat (Ipoh West) and Ipoh Timor (Ipoh East). The parliamentary seat for Ipoh Barat is held by Democratic Action Party (DAP) Representative M. Kulasegaran. The seat for Ipoh Timor is held by fellow DAP leader Howard Lee Chuan How. As of 2022, there were 233,000 voters in Ipoh. Most of the voters in Ipoh are Chinese, followed by Malays, Indians and others.

Ethnic breakdown of Ipoh's electorate as of 2022
1. Chinese (63.5%)
2. Malay (18.5%)
3. Indian (17.0%)
4. Other ethnicities (0.92%)

== Demographics ==
Ipoh is one of Malaysia's largest cities. As of 2010, the municipal area of Ipoh has a population of 657,892. It ranks as the seventh most populous urban centre in Malaysia (2010).

These are statistics from the Department of Statistics Malaysia 2010 census.

Ethnic groups in Ipoh, 2010
Ethnicity	Population	Percentage
Chinese	270,165	44.11%
Bumiputera	253,592	38.55%
Indian	110,024	14.07%
Others	1,559	0.2%
Non-Malaysian	19,989	3.04%

== Town layout ==
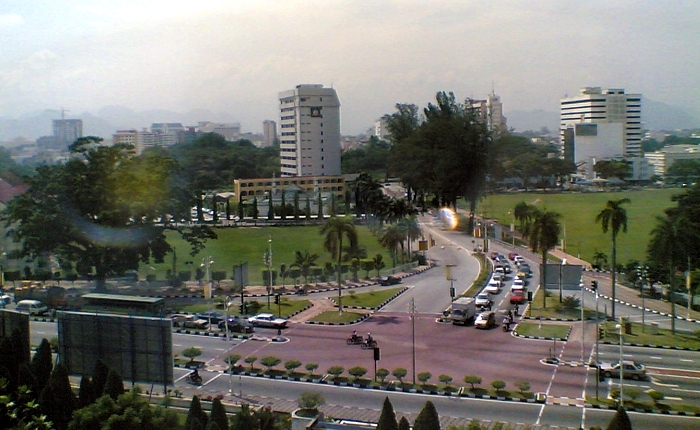
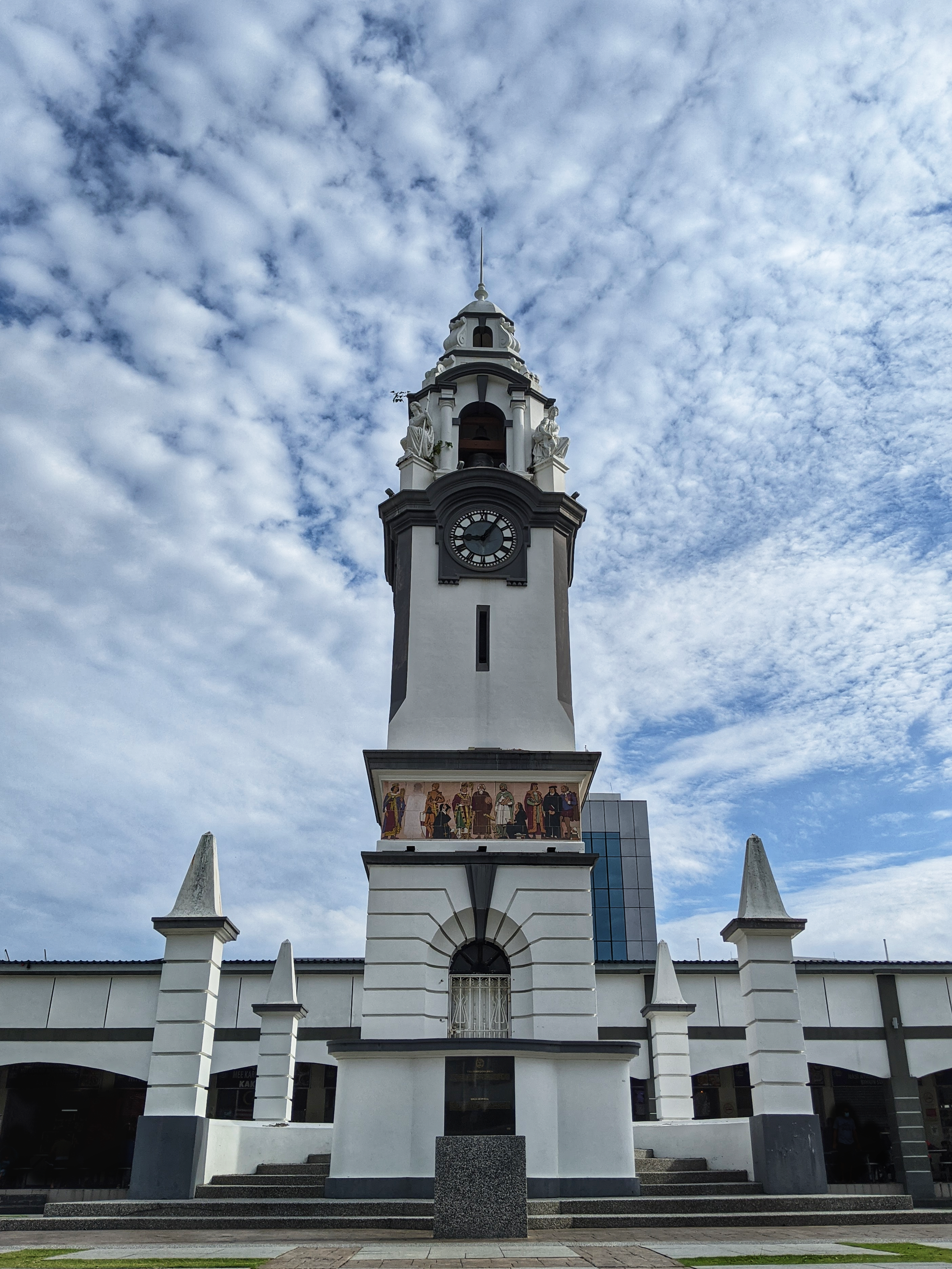
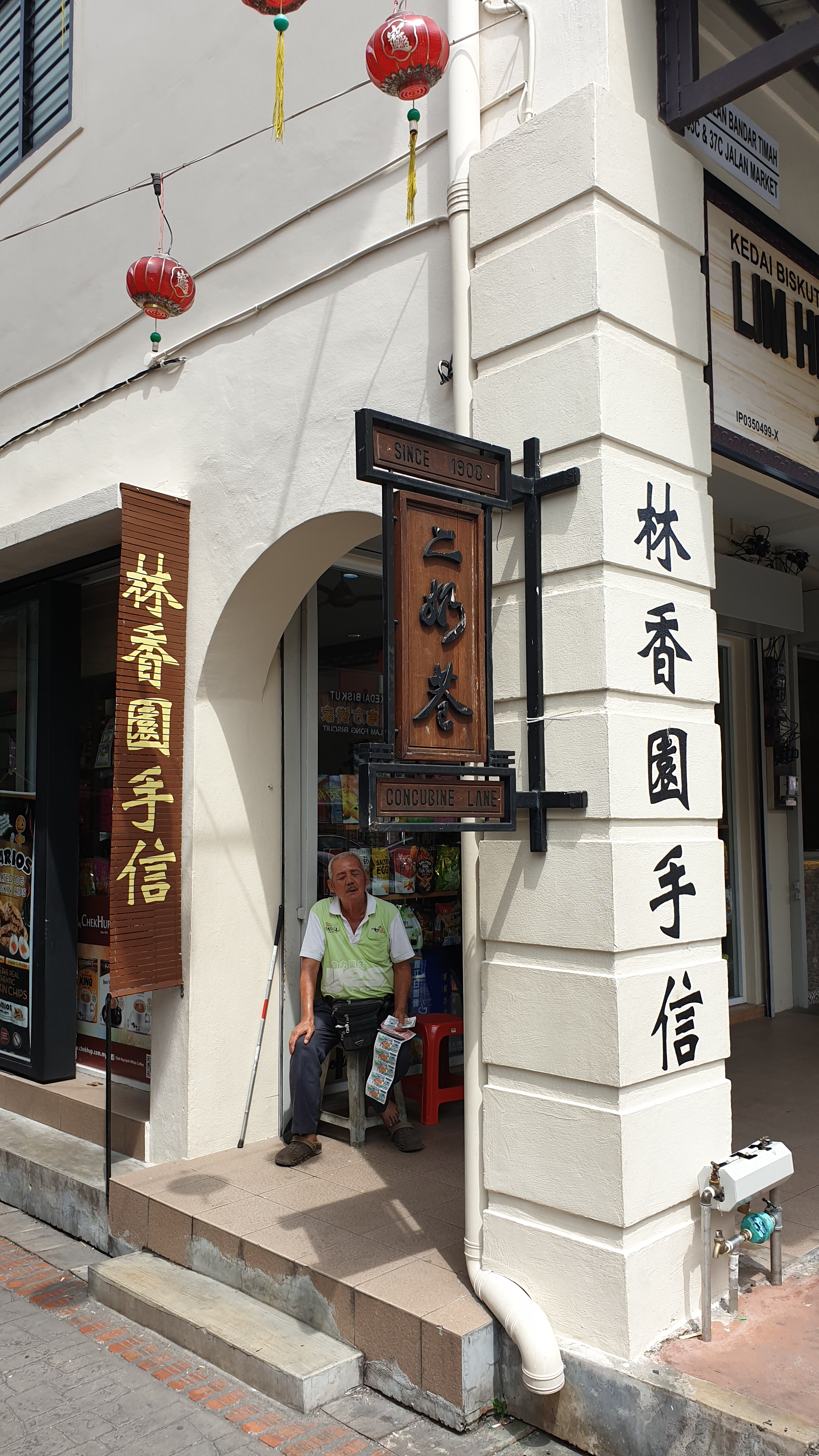
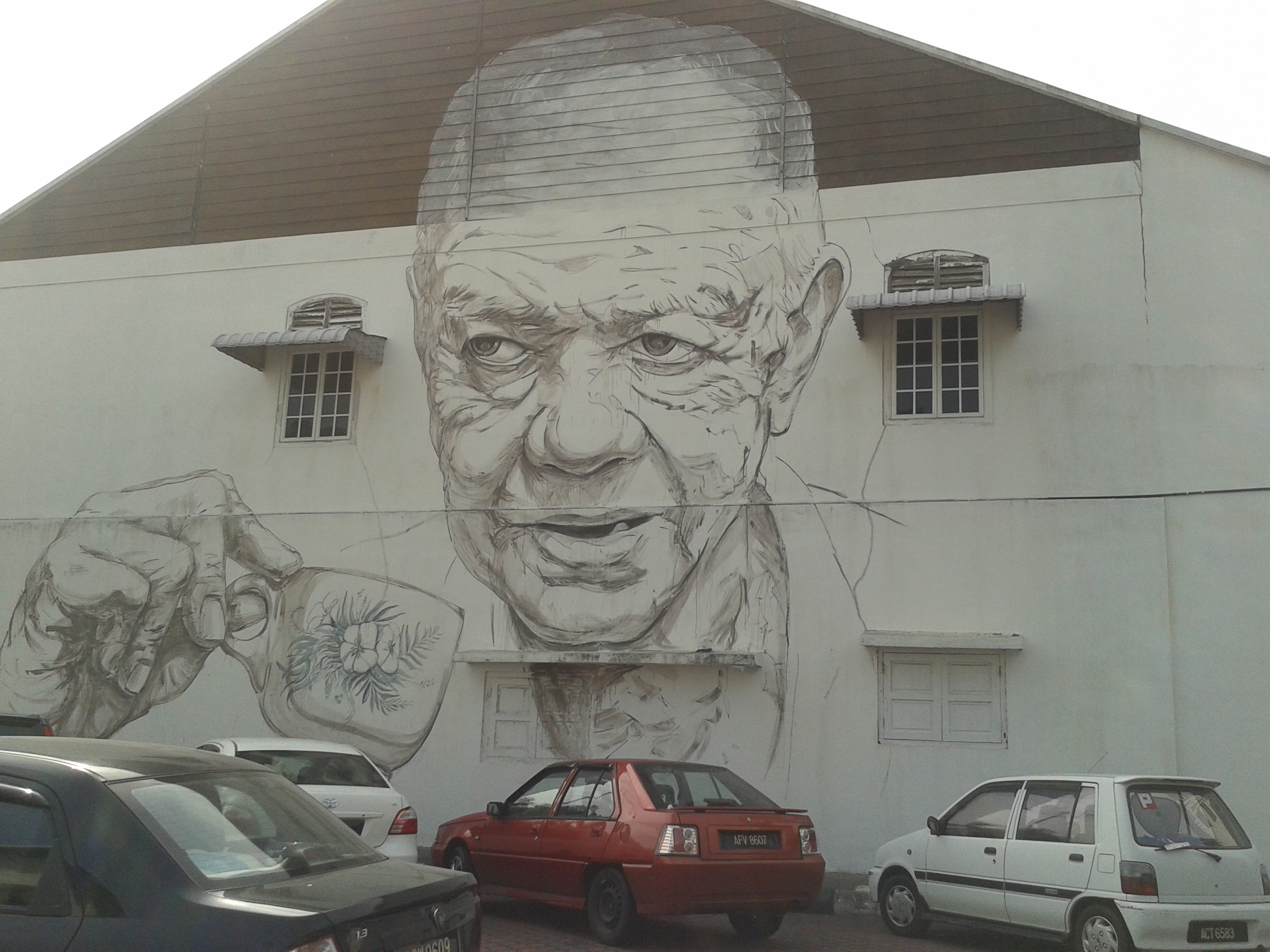
Ipoh's Old Town, clockwise from top right: Birch Memorial Clock Tower, wall mural by Ernest Zacharevic, Concubine Lane, skyline of the administrative center

Ipoh is a medium-sized city with a polycentric and decentralised urban structure. Its historic Old Town serves as a symbolic cultural and heritage core, featuring colonial-era architecture, heritage streets, and cafés, but most of the city’s residential, commercial, and cultural activities are distributed across suburban neighbourhoods such as Greentown, Canning Garden, Bercham, and Station 18.

The decentralised layout makes Ipoh largely car-dependent, and the dispersed nature of economic and social hubs means that the Old Town is relatively quiet outside of daytime tourist activity. The city’s pattern contrasts with more compact heritage cities, where tourism and local life overlap in a single central district. This structure also influences visitor experiences: first-time tourists often perceive Old Town as the city’s sole centre, while many notable cultural, culinary, and religious sites lie in outlying areas.

== Culture ==
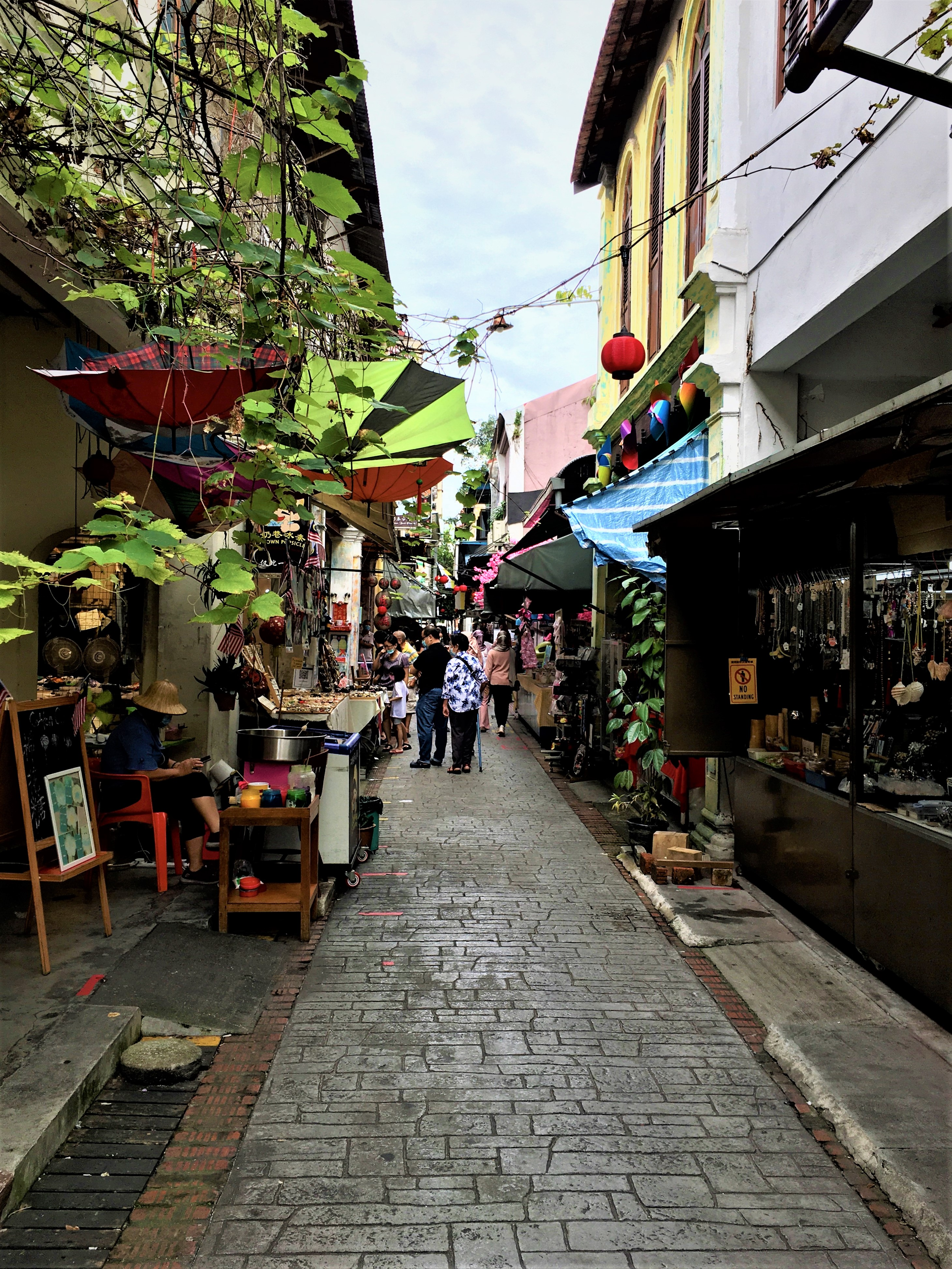
Concubine Lane, one of the cultural and culinary hubs in the city

=== Cuisine ===
Ipoh has a significant food scene with many hawker centres and restaurants. It has dishes derived from Malay, Chinese and Indian cuisine. See

=== Film and television ===
Movies filmed in Ipoh include:

- 1992: Indochine
- 1999: Anna and the King
- 2003: Kadhal Kisu Kisu
- 2005: Sepet
- 2005: Gubra
- 2006: After This Our Exile
- 2006: Goodbye Boys
- 2006: Lust, Caution
- 2015: Blackhat

=== Greenery & Public Parks ===
- D. R. Seenivasagam Park (Coronation Park)
- Sultan Abdul Aziz Recreational Park (Polo Ground)
- Kledang Saiong Forest Eco Park
- Botani Eco Park

=== Theme parks ===
There are several theme parks in Ipoh, including the Sunway Lost World of Tambun and the now defunct Movies Animated Park Studios (MAPS).

=== Famous attractions ===
A list of attractions:

- Qing Xing Ling Leisure & Cultural Village
- Kek Look Tong Cave Temple
- Perak Cave Temple
- Banjaran Hotsprings Retreat
- Tasik Cermin (Mirror Lake)
- Gunung Lang Recreational Park
- Pavilion Petting Zoo & Gunung Lang Climbing Park
- Funtasy House Trick Art
- Fujiwara Tofa Shop
- Kinta Riverfront
- Ipoh Town Hall
- Market Lane (Concubine Lane)
- Trail of Dr. Sun Yat Sen and His Comrades in Ipoh
- Sam Poh Tong Temple
- Ipoh Railway Station
- Sultan Azlan Shah Roundabout

== Transport ==
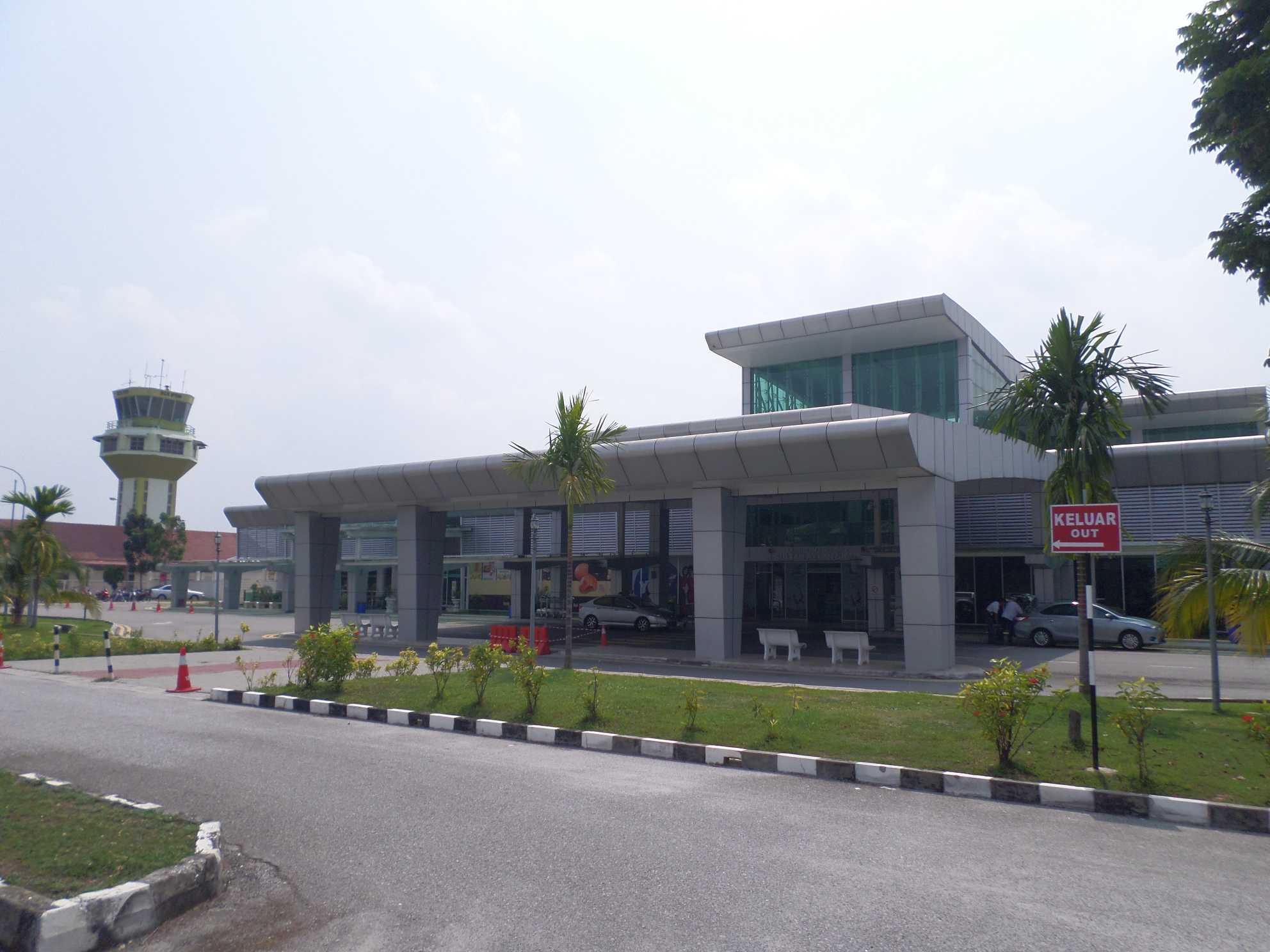
Sultan Azlan Shah Airport

=== Roads ===
The old interstate Federal Route 1 connects Ipoh with other major towns and cities in peninsular Malaysia, for example to Alor Setar, Taiping and Penang to the north and Tapah, Kuala Lumpur, Seremban and even Johor Bahru in the south. Motorists from the east coast can use Federal Route 4 (from Gerik) in northern Perak or Federal Route 185 (from Cameron Highlands).

The new North–South Expressway is a faster and more efficient alternative to Route 1. However, some towns like Kampar can only be accessible via Route 1.

=== Train ===
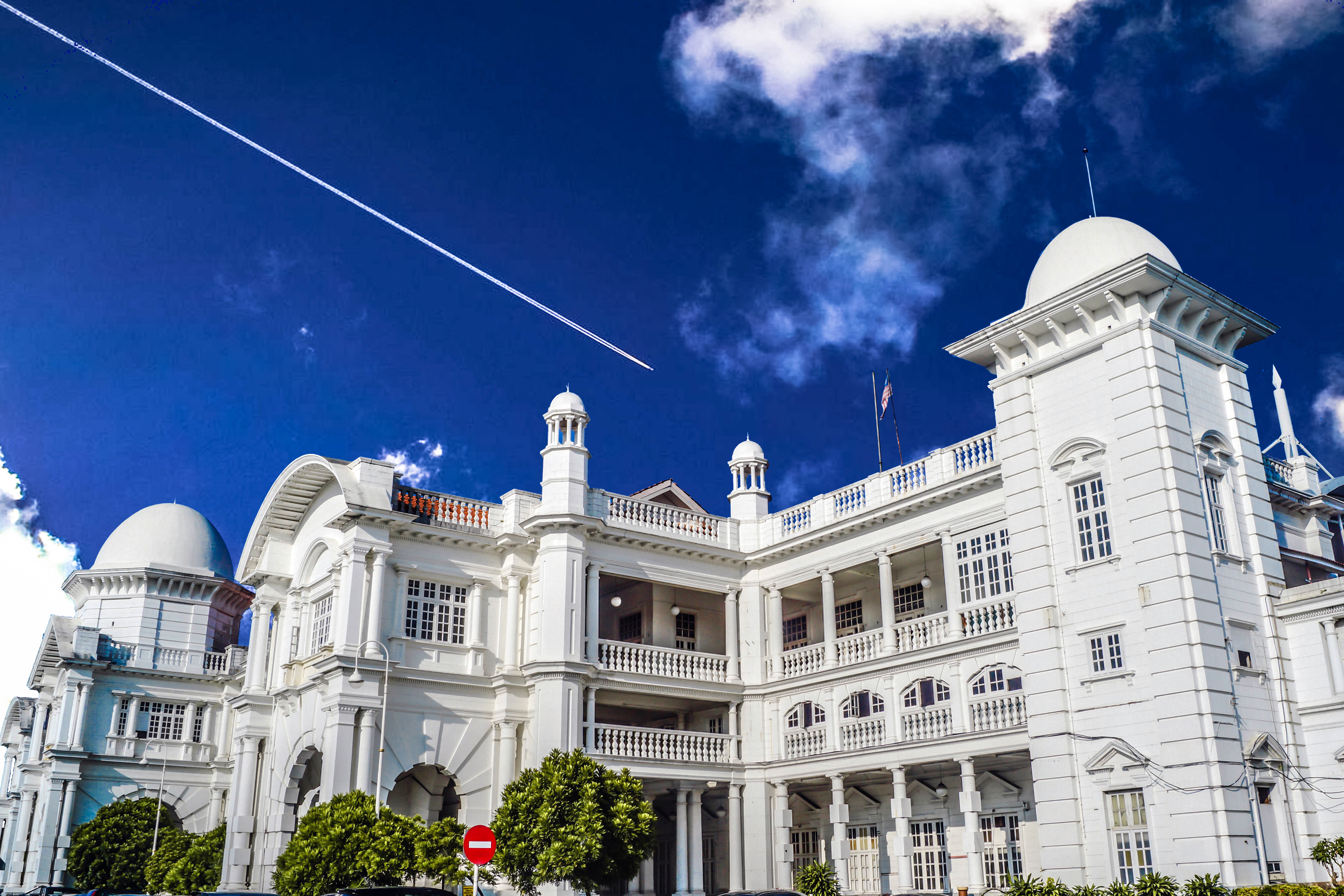
Ipoh Railway Station

Ipoh's railway station is operated by Keretapi Tanah Melayu (KTM) and is in the Old Town. However, it does not have intra-city travel like there is in Kuala Lumpur; the railway only connects Ipoh with neighbouring towns and cities. The station is a stately building, referred to by locals as the "Taj Mahal of Ipoh". KTM Intercity began the Shuttle Train Service between Kuala Lumpur and Ipoh from 1 December 2008 while the modern Electric Train System (ETS) shuttle began from 12 August 2010, with an average speed of 145 km/h (90 mph), plying the Ipoh-Seremban route, which cut the travelling distance between Ipoh and Kuala Lumpur to 120 minutes. There are 10 dedicated shuttle train services between these two cities daily, beginning at 5 am from both of the stations. Travel time between the cities was expected to be reduced from three hours to two hours and fifteen minutes when the new set of EMU trains arrived in mid-2009.

=== Bus ===
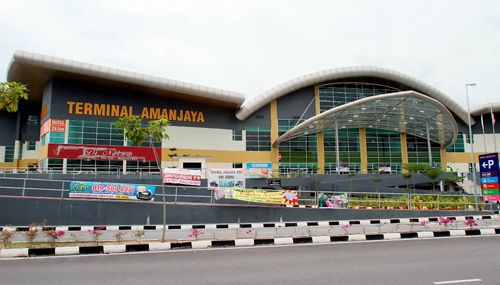
Ipoh Amanjaya Bus Terminal

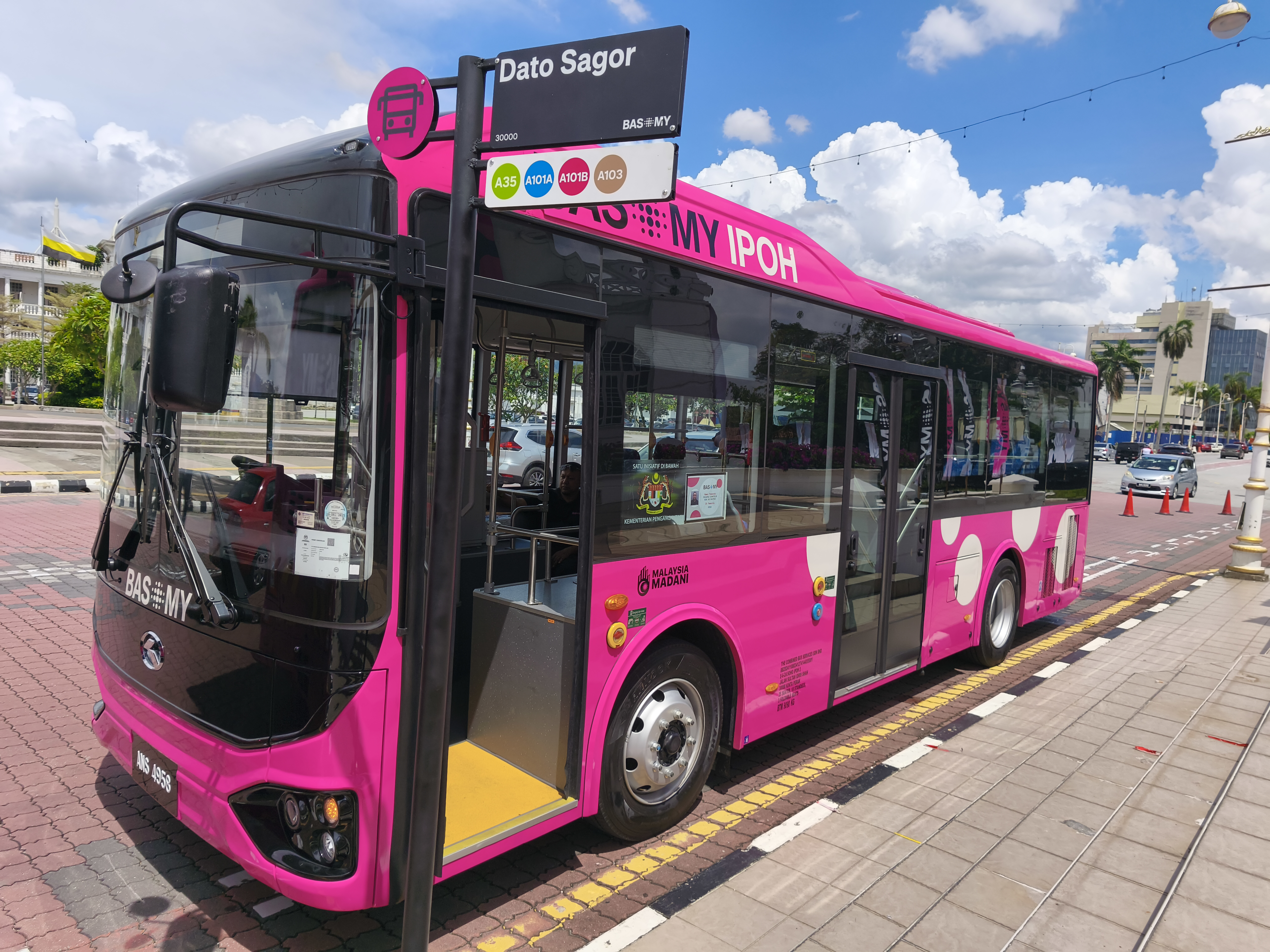
A bus in Ipoh operated by Perak Transit under BAS.MY Ipoh

The inter-city bus terminal is located at Amanjaya Integrated Bus Terminal in Bandar Meru Raya, just north of the city. Medan Kidd is the public transport intracity terminal that is very near to Ipoh Railway Station. Currently, the main public transport operator in the city is PerakTransit under the branding of BAS.MY Ipoh.

Code	Route
A30A	Medan Kidd - Terminal Meru Raya
A30B	Medan Kidd - Terminal Meru Raya - Chemor
A31A	Medan Kidd - Kuala Kangsar via Jalan Panglima Bukit Gantang Wahab
A31B	Medan Kidd - Kuala Kangsar via Jalan Tun Abdul Razak
A31X	Medan Kidd - Chemor via Jalan Panglima Bukit Gantang Wahab
A32	Medan Kidd - Bercham - Tanjung Rambutan
A33A	Medan Kidd - Tanjung Rambutan - Chemor
A33B	Medan Kidd - Tanjung Rambutan
A34	Medan Kidd - Gopeng - Kampar
A35	Medan Kidd - Pasir Puteh - Pengkalan Sentosa
A36	Medan Kidd - Batu Gajah - Seri Iskandar
A37	Medan Kidd - LTSAS (Ipoh Airport) - Taman Botani
A100	Bandaraya Ipoh - Feeder
A101A	Medan Kidd - Bercham via Taman Ipoh
A101B	Medan Kidd - Bercham via Kampung Simee
A102	Medan Kidd - Manjoi - Buntong
A103	Medan Kidd - Taman Cempaka - Ampang

=== Air ===
The Sultan Azlan Shah Airport is the only airport in Ipoh, located near Gunung Rapat. Scoot provides daily flights from Ipoh to Singapore Changi Airport while AirAsia provides daily flights to Senai International Airport, serving as a link to the city of Johor Bahru. Penang International Airport is located 154 km (96 mi) north-west Ipoh and is more frequently used due to its wider range of domestic and international destinations.

== Education ==
This is a list of schools in Ipoh, Perak.

- Seri Botani International School, Ipoh
- Sekolah Izzuddin Shah
- Sekolah Tuanku Abdul Rahman
- Sekolah Menengah Kebangsaan Bercham
- Sekolah Menengah Kebangsaan Tanjung Rambutan
- Sekolah Menengah Kebangsaan Seri Puteri
- Sekolah Jenis Kebangsaan (T) St. Philomena Convent, Ipoh
- Sekolah Kebangsaan Dato' Panglima Kinta, Ipoh
- Sekolah Jenis Kebangsaan (C) Yuk Choy, Ipoh
- SMJK Yuk Choy, Ipoh
- Tarcisian Convent School, Ipoh (TCS)
- Anderson School, Ipoh
- Anglo-Chinese School, Ipoh
- St. Michael's Institution, Ipoh
- SMK Jalan Tasek, Ipoh
- Methodist Girls Secondary School (MGS), Ipoh
- Perak Girls Secondary School (PGS), Ipoh
- SMK Main Convent, Ipoh
- Wesley Methodist School, Ipoh
- Ipoh International School (Private)
- Fairview International School, Ipoh
- Perak Yuk Choy High School (Private), Ipoh
- Poi Lam High School (Private), Ipoh
- Shen Jai High School (Private), Ipoh
- Sekolah Jenis Kebangsaan (T) Kerajaan, Sungai Pari, Ipoh
- Sekolah Jenis Kebangsaan (T) Gunung Rapat, Ipoh
- Sekolah Jenis Kebangsaan (T) Perak Sangeetha Sabha, Ipoh
- SMK Rapat Setia, Ipoh
- SMK Jalan Pasir Puteh, Ipoh
- Sekolah Jenis Kebangsaan (C) Poi Lam, Ipoh
- SMK Seri Keledang, Ipoh
- SMK Menglembu, Ipoh
- SMJK Poi Lam, Ipoh
- Sekolah Jenis Kebangsaan (C) Sam Tet, Ipoh
- SMJK Sam Tet, Ipoh
- SMK Dato Ahmad Said
- Sekolah Jenis Kebangsaan Ave Maria Convent, Ipoh
- SMJK Ave Maria Convent, Ipoh
- Sekolah Jenis Kebangsaan (C) Gunung Rapat, Ipoh
- Sekolah Jenis Kebangsaan (C) Wan Hwa (1)
- Sekolah Jenis Kebangsaan (C) Wan Hwa (2)
- Sekolah Kebangsaan (ACS), Ipoh
- Sekolah Kebangsaan (P) Methodist, Ipoh
- Sekolah Kebangsaan Haji Mahmud Chemor, Ipoh
- Sekolah Kebangsaan Kuala Pari, Ipoh
- Sekolah Kebangsaan Jalan Pegoh
- Sekolah Kebangsaan Jelapang
- Sekolah Kebangsaan Marian Convent, Ipoh
- Sekolah Kebangsaan Raja Ekram, Ipoh
- SMK Raja Perempuan, Ipoh (RPS) Royal Princess School "Cluster School"
- SRK Raja Perempuan, Ipoh (RPS)
- Sekolah Kebangsaan Seri Ampang, Ipoh
- Sekolah Kebangsaan St. Michael's Institution (1), Ipoh
- Sekolah Kebangsaan St. Michael's Institution (2), Ipoh
- Sekolah Jenis Kebangsaan (C) Chung Shan

== Sports ==
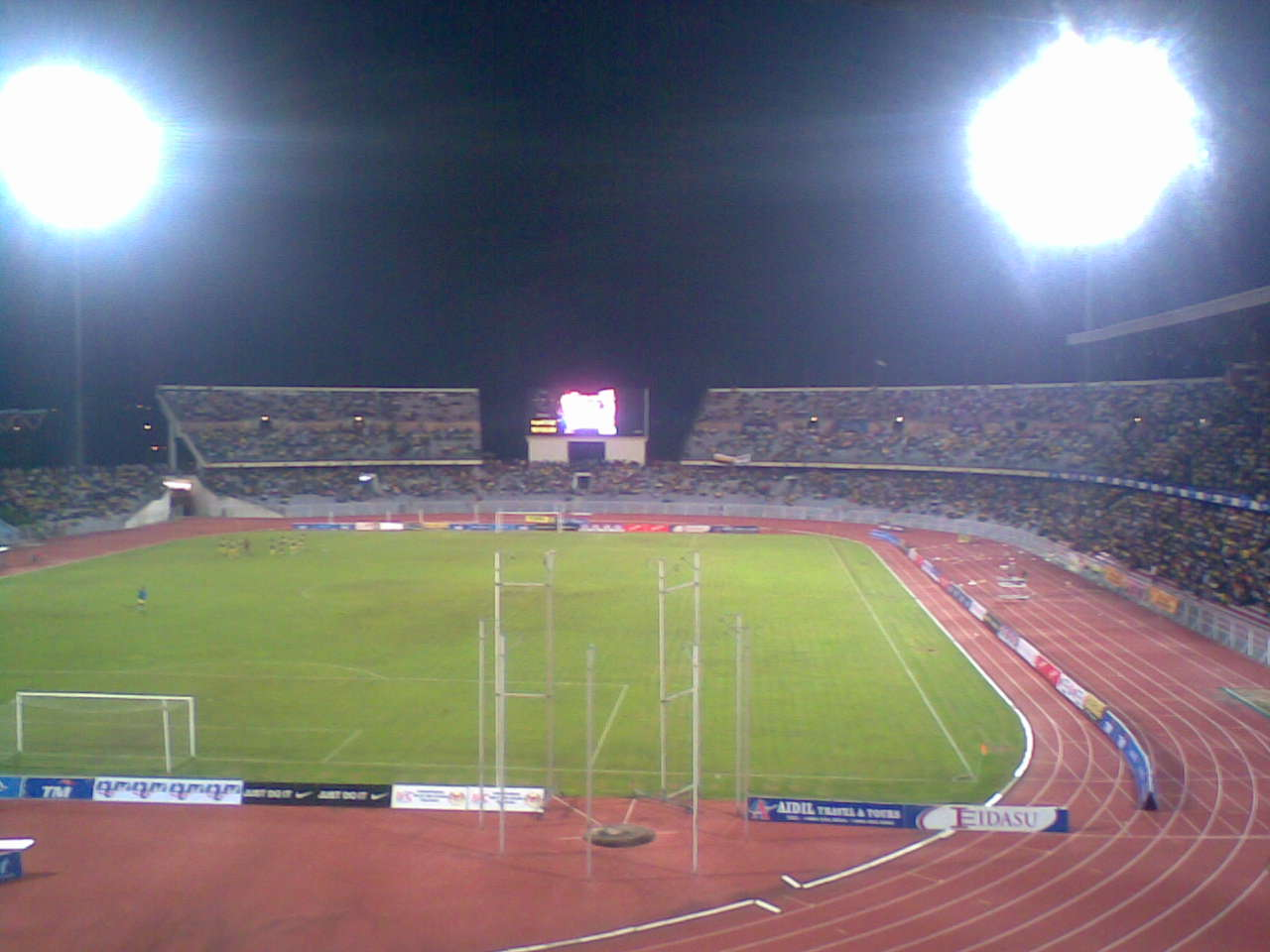
Perak Stadium

Ipoh has a sports complex known as Kompleks Sukan MBI or MBI Sports Complex. Among the facilities located within the complex is the Perak Stadium (Malay: Stadium Perak), the home of Perak Football Association who play in the Malaysia Super League.

The Royal Perak Golf Club off Jalan Sultan Azlan Shah (Tiger Lane), the Meru Golf Club in Jelapang, and Clearwater Sanctuary Golf Club en route to Batu Gajah are golf courses in Ipoh. Other sports venues include the Kilat Club in Pasir Pinji, Ipoh Field (Padang Ipoh) in the Old Town, the Polo Grounds, and the Iskandar Polo Club in Ampang Baru.

The Sultan Azlan Shah Cup is an annual international men's field hockey tournament held in Ipoh.

== Notable people ==
Film and television

- Angie Cheong, actress
- Mimi Chu, actress and singer
- Iqram Dinzly, actor and model
- Mamat Khalid, film director and screenwriter
- Peter Pek, TV host and businessman
- Patrick Teoh, actor and radio host
- Michelle Yeoh, actress famous for role in Crouching Tiger, Hidden Dragon
- Natasha Hudson, actress and model
- Mandy Lieu, actress and model
- Peter Madden, actor

Music

- Michael Wong, singer-songwriter
- Jamal Abdillah, pop singer and actor
- Francissca Peter, singer-songwriter
- Sophia Liana
- Sam Chin Neng of pop duo Fuying & Sam

Sports (badminton)

- Koo Kien Keat
- Choong Tan Fook
- Lee Wan Wah
- Cheah Soon Kit
- Wong Pei Tty
- Wong Mew Choo
- Chen Tang Jie

Sports (football)

- Nazirul Naim
- Chan Kok Heng
- Muhamad Khalid Jamlus
- Azizon Abdul Kadir

Sports (others)

- Tony Underwood (rugby)
- Nur Suryani Mohd Taibi (sports shooting)
- Leong Mun Yee (diving)
- Cheong Jun Hoong (diving)
- Cindy Ong Pik Yin (competitive swimming)

Business

- David Ho Sue San of Hovid Berhad and Carotech Berhad
- Lee Loy Seng, founder of Kuala Lumpur Kepong Berhad
- Dr. Wong Jeh Shyan, CEO of CommerceNet Singapore Limited
- Koon Yew Yin, founder of IJM Corporation Bhd and Gamuda Berhad
- Leong Sin Nam, tin mine owner
- Eu Tong Sen, tin mine owner
- Foo Choo Choon, tin mine owner who has a road in Ipoh named after him
- Chung Thye Phin, tin mine owner who has a road in Ipoh named after him
- Leong Fee, tin mine owner
- Winnie Loo, hairstylist, entrepreneur, author

Politics

- Yeoh Ghim Seng, Speaker of the Parliament of Singapore 1970–1989
- Dr Yeoh Eng Kiong, Hong Kong Secretary for Health, Welfare and Food 2002–2004
- S. J. V. Chelvanayakam, Member of the Ceylonese Parliament 1956–1977
- Ahmad Husni Hanadzlah, Second Minister of Finance of Malaysia 2009–2016
- D. R. Seenivasagam, co-founder of the People's Progressive Party
- Lim Keng Yaik, president of the Malaysian People's Movement Party 1980–2007
- Lee Lam Thye, social activist and former politician
- Chang Lih Kang, Malaysian politician
- Lee Chuan How, Member of the Perak State Executive Council 2018–2020
- Yusof bin Ishak, president of Singapore 1965–1970

Science and engineering

- Hong Wai Onn, first Malaysian engineer granted the Freedom of the City of London

Other

- Adeline Ooi, curator and art advisor
- Andrea Fonseka, beauty paegeant titleholder (maternal hometown)
- Chan Sek Keong, Chief Justice of Singapore 2006–2012
- Lat, cartoonist
- Huen Su Yin, blogger and cake designer
- Desmond Koh, YouTuber and Chief Technical Officer of Coregas
- Tang Siew Mun, academic
- Tang Tuck Kan, artist
- Wu Lien-teh, physician during the Manchurian Plague

== Sister cities ==
Ipoh currently has two sister cities:

- Nanning, China (2015).
- Fukuoka, Japan (2015).
- Zugló, Hungary (2026)

== See also ==
- Jalan Ipoh - a road in Kuala Lumpur named after Ipoh
- Jalan Ipoh MRT station
- List of Ipoh areas
- List of roads in Ipoh
