= Huen =

Huen may refer to:

== People ==
- Huen Su Yin (born 1985), Malaysian blogger and cake designer
- Marianela Huen (born 1960), Venezuelan swimmer
- Victor Huen (1874–1939), French illustrator

== Places ==
- Entebbe International Airport, Uganda (by ICAO code)
