= List of Ipoh areas =

The following towns, suburbs, and neighborhoods comprise the area formally (and collectively) known as Greater Ipoh, Malaysia.

(Source: Ipoh City Hall)

== Towns/Suburbs ==
- Ampang
- Anjung Tawas
- Bandar Seri Botani
- Bercham
- Buntong
- Canning Garden
- Chemor
- Cyber City
- Falim
- Greentown
- Gugusan Manjoi
- Gunung Rapat
- Ipoh Garden
- Ipoh Old Town (Pekan Lama)
- Ipoh New Town (Pekan Baru)
- Jelapang
- Keledang
- Klebang
- Lahat
- Meru Raya
- Menglembu
- Pasir Puteh
- Pasir Pinji
- Pengkalan
- Silibin
- Simpang Pulai
- Station 18
- Sunway City
- Tambun
- Tanjung Rambutan
- Tasek
- Ulu Kinta

== Neighborhoods ==
- Kampung Simee
- Kampung Sungai Rokam
- Taman Cempaka
- Taman Ipoh Jaya
