= David Ho (disambiguation) =

David Ho (born 1952) is a Taiwanese American AIDS researcher

David Ho may also refer to:

- David Ho (artist), Chinese-American artist
- David Ho (businessman) (born c. 1953), Vancouver-based entrepreneur originally from Hong Kong, founder of Harmony Airways
- David Ho (oceanographer), American oceanographer and founder of Bamboo Bike Project
- David Ho Sue San (born 1949), Malaysia Chinese pharmaceutical entrepreneur
