= Adeline Ooi =

Curator and art advisor

- Born: 1976 (age 49–50); Ipoh, Malaysia
- Education: Central Saint Martins
- Occupation: Director Asia Art Basel

Adeline Ooi (born 1976, Ipoh, Malaysia) is a curator and art advisor. From 2015 to 2023, she served as Director Asia for Art Basel’s show in Hong Kong and as a member of Art Basel's executive committee.

== Early life and education ==
Ooi holds a BA (Hons) in Fine Arts from Central Saint Martins, London. Ooi is the recipient of The Nippon Foundation’s Asian Public Intellectual (Junior) Fellowships Grant 2002/2003.

== Career ==
Throughout 2003 Ooi worked on a number of regional projects in various capacities with institutions and galleries in Southeast Asia focusing mainly on Malaysian, Indonesian and Filipino contemporary art. She directed and co-founded RogueArt in 2009, a cultural agency based in Malaysia, where her clients included artists, galleries, institutions, and both corporate and private collections. Between 2006 and 2008, she worked as Curator and Program Director of Valentine Willie Fine Art gallery, Kuala Lumpur. Before becoming Director Asia for Art Basel, Ooi worked as Art Basel's VIP Relations Manager for Southeast Asia, covering Indonesia, Malaysia, the Philippines, Singapore, Thailand and Vietnam for two years.
