= Sam Poh Tong Temple =

Buddhist temple in Ipoh, Malaysia

- Malay: Tokong Sam Poh Tong; Chinese: 三寶洞
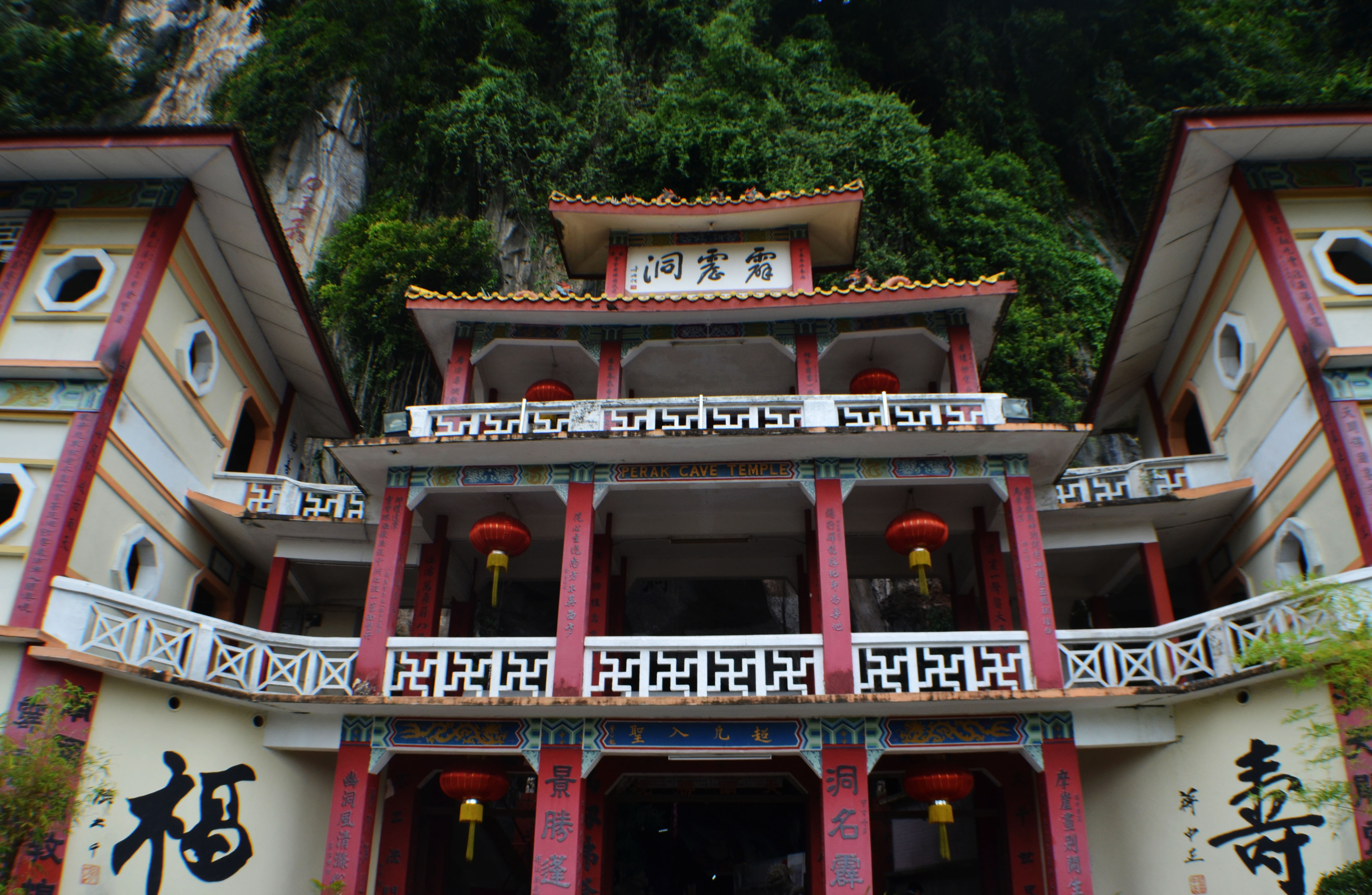

Religion
- Affiliation: Buddhism

Location
- Location: Ipoh
- State: Perak
- Country: Malaysia
- Interactive map of Sam Poh Tong Temple
- Coordinates: 4°33′49.429″N 101°6′55.464″E

Architecture
- Type: Chinese temple
- Established: 1950

The Sam Poh Tong Temple (Chinese: 三寶洞 'three treasures cave') (also known as the Three Buddhas Cave) is a Chinese temple built within a limestone cave and is the oldest and the main cave temple in Ipoh, Perak, Malaysia. The temple was built in a raw limestone cave in the mountains located about 5 km from the city centre and follows Mahāyāna Buddhism.

== History ==
The cave which now became the temple gateway was founded by a monk from China in 1890 who walked through the area from Ipoh. The monk then decided to make the cave his home and a place for meditation where he remained until the end of his life. This was then continued by other monks and nuns. A temple was then constructed in the 1950s.

In Malaysia's Sam Poh Cave, a striking collection of multicultural cave paintings has been discovered, reflecting the history of the three major ethnic groups.

Located in the state of Perak, Sam Poh Cave is a Buddhist temple and a historically significant site. Within the cave, various rock paintings have been found, depicting images from different cultural and religious backgrounds. These paintings illustrate elements of Buddhism, Taoism, and Hinduism, showcasing the exchange and fusion of diverse cultures and religions in this location.

Specifically, some rock paintings depict deities from Hinduism, such as Vishnu and Parvati. This suggests that in ancient times, Malaysia's Indian community engaged in cultural and religious exchanges with other ethnic and religious groups.

This intriguing discovery emphasizes that the cave paintings at Sam Poh Cave serve as a site reflecting the history of multiculturalism. It proves that in this region, there exists a historical narrative of interaction and coexistence among different ethnicities and religious communities.

== Features ==
From a steep climb of 246 steps to the cave opening, visitors can view the city of Ipoh and its surroundings. It is the largest cave temple in Malaysia and contains art work such as a reclining Buddha figure. The temple also offers visitors the opportunity to feed fish and feed or release turtles into its turtle pond as a means of balancing one's karma.

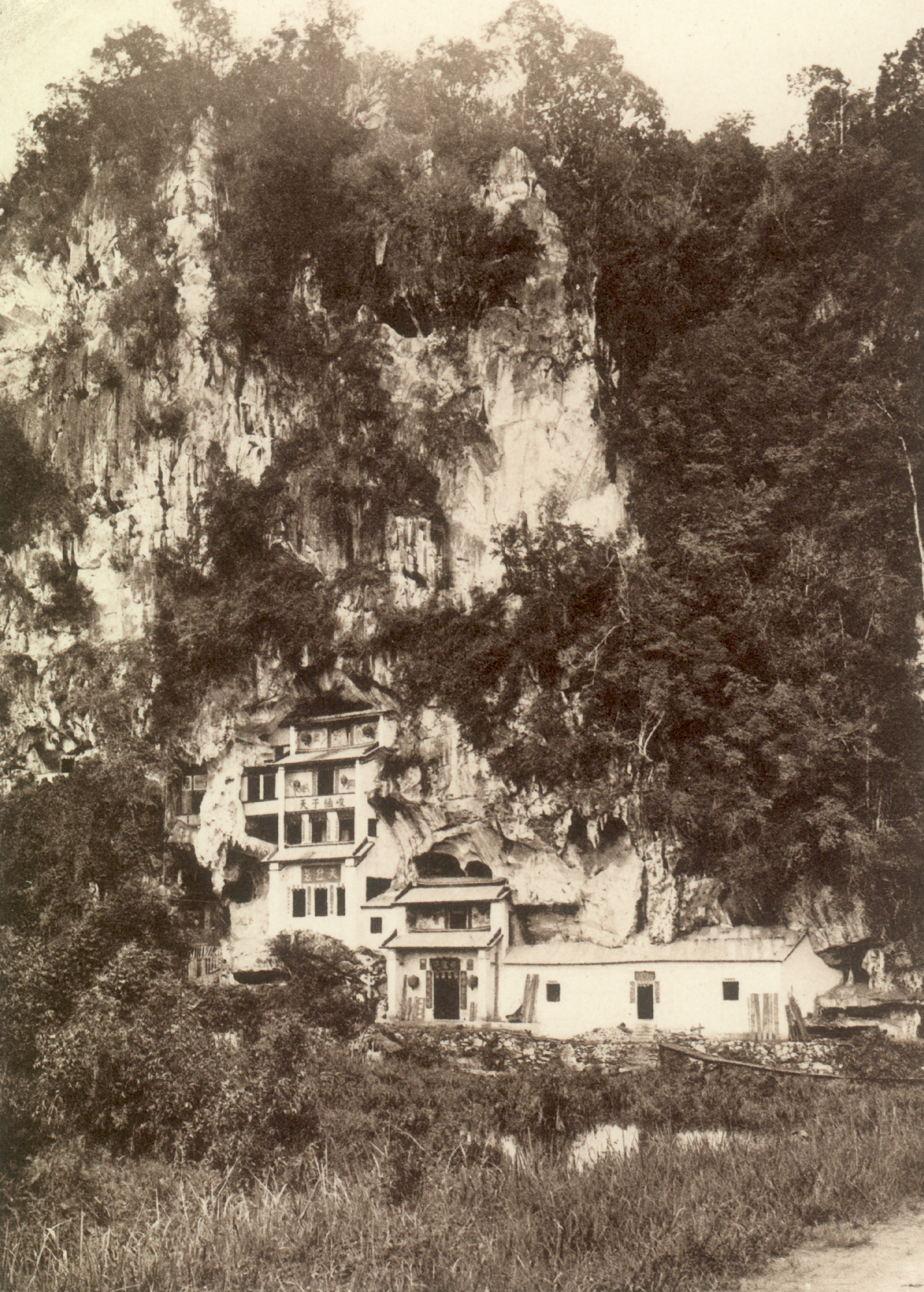
The temple in 1910, photograph taken by Charles J. Kleingrothe.

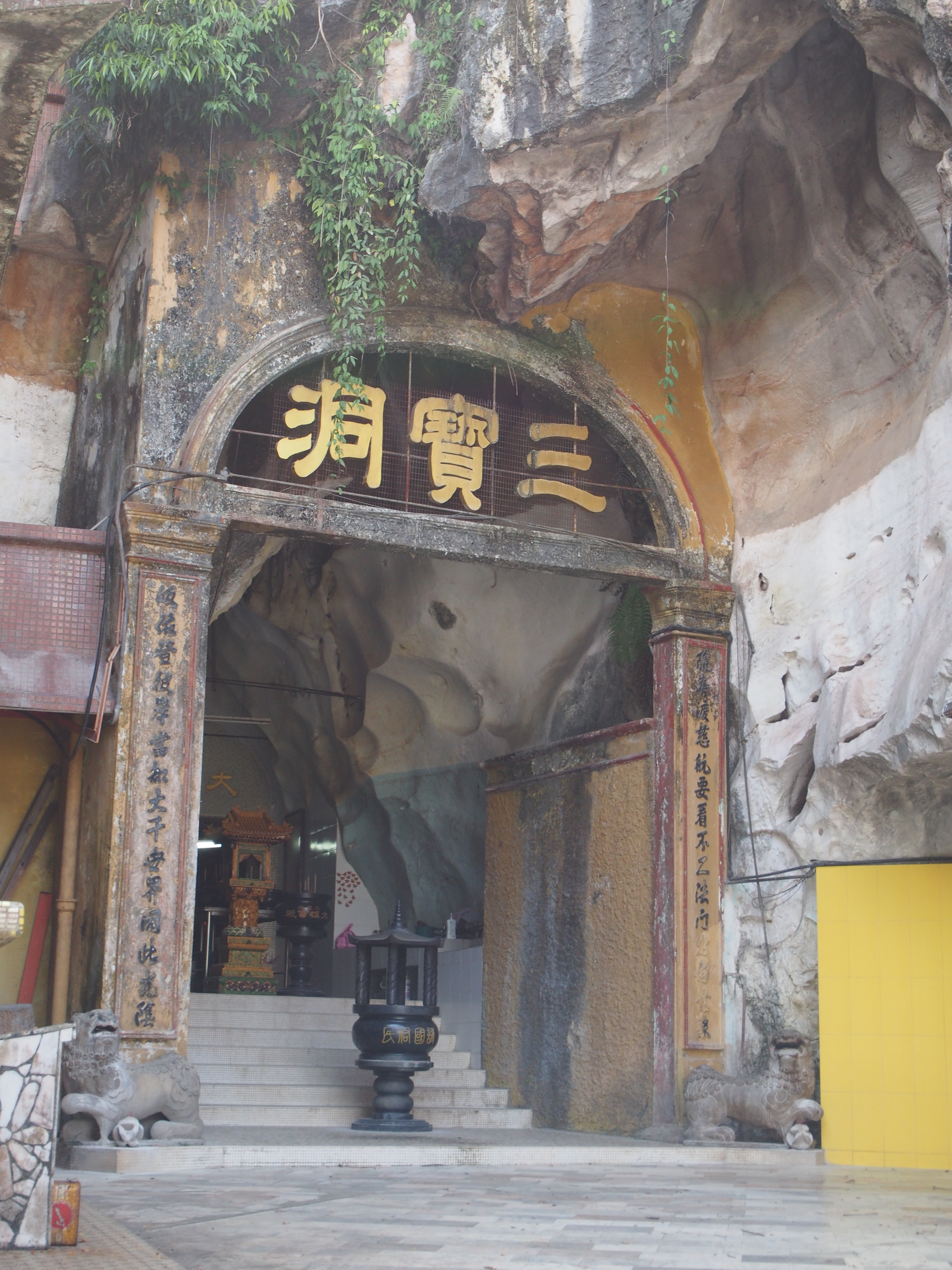
Cave entrance

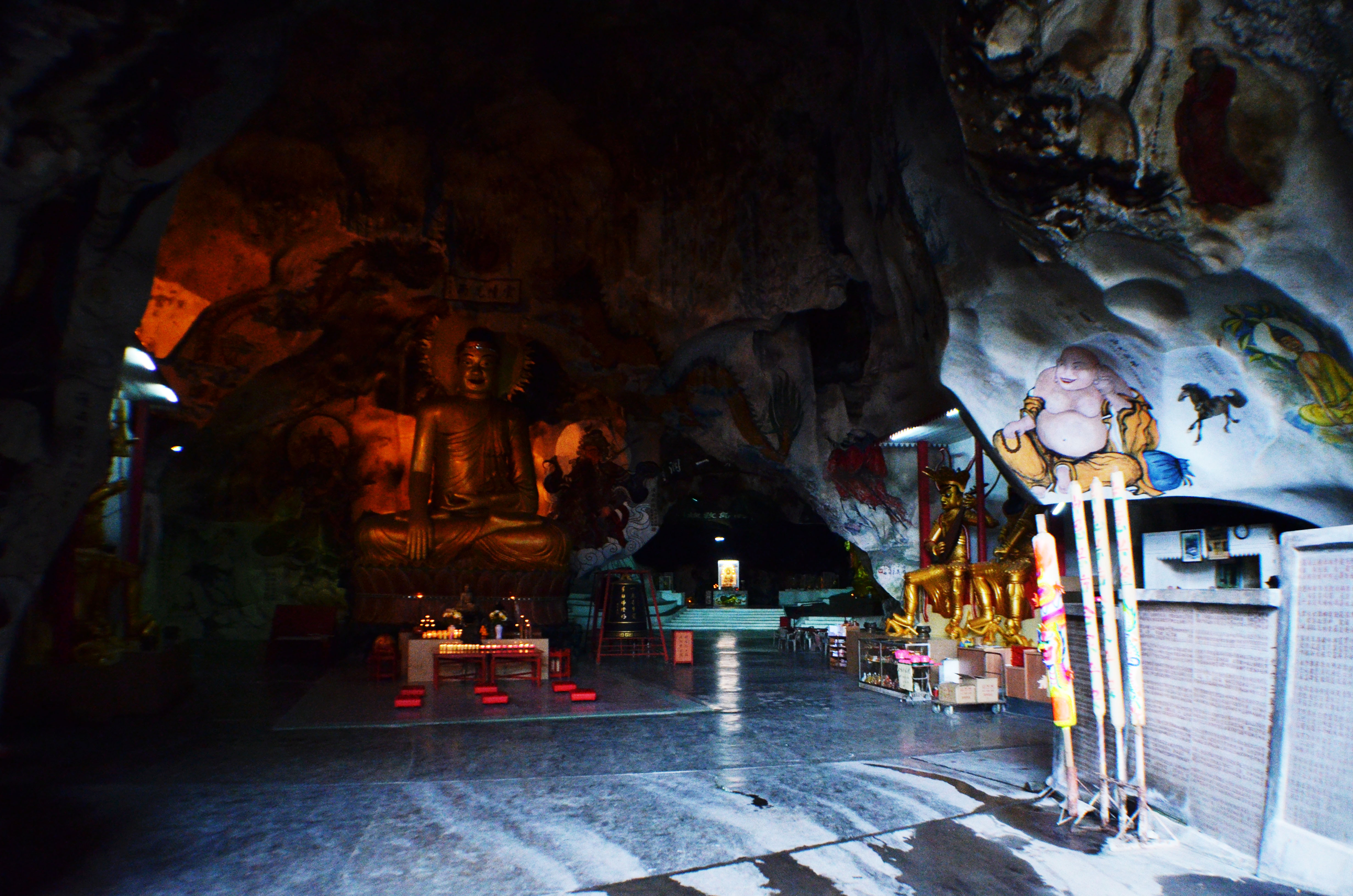
Buddha statue.

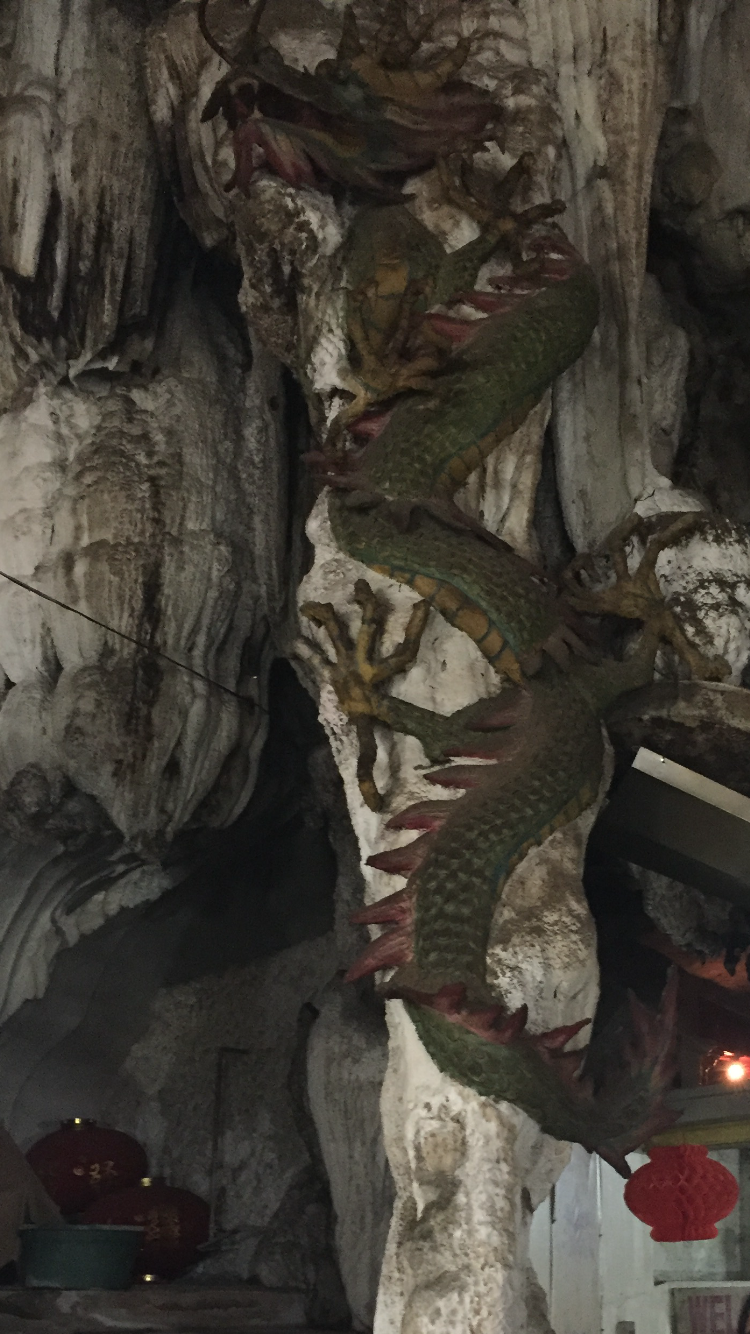
Chinese dragon inside the cave temple

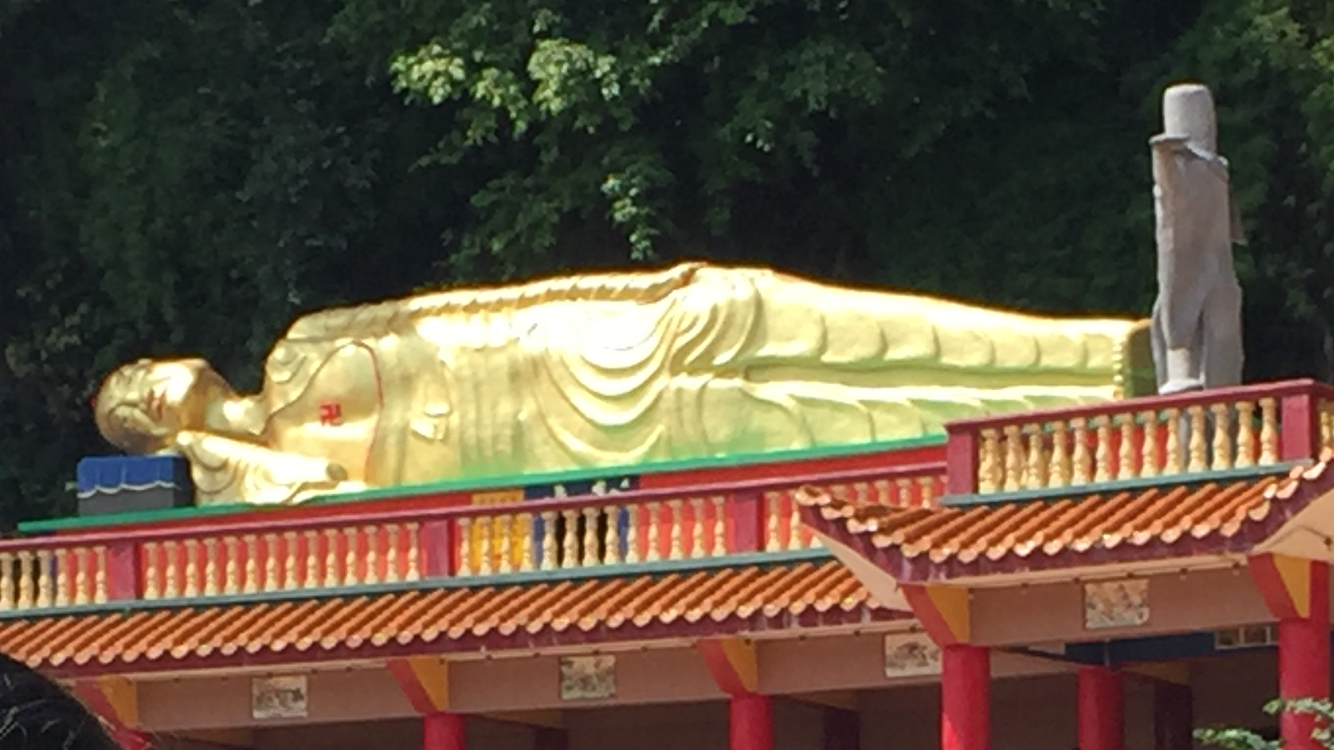
Reclining Buddha outside the temple compound.

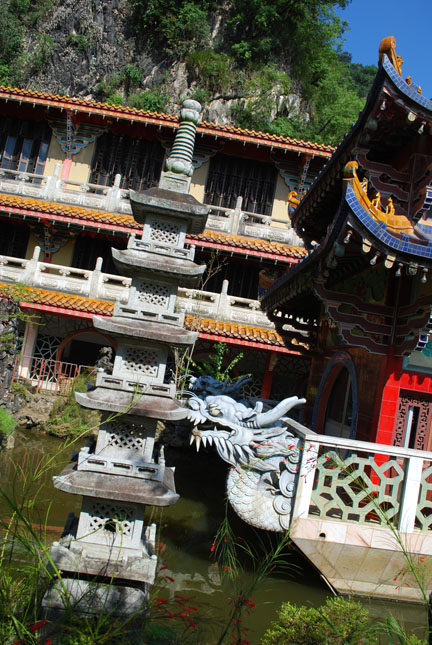
The temple garden.

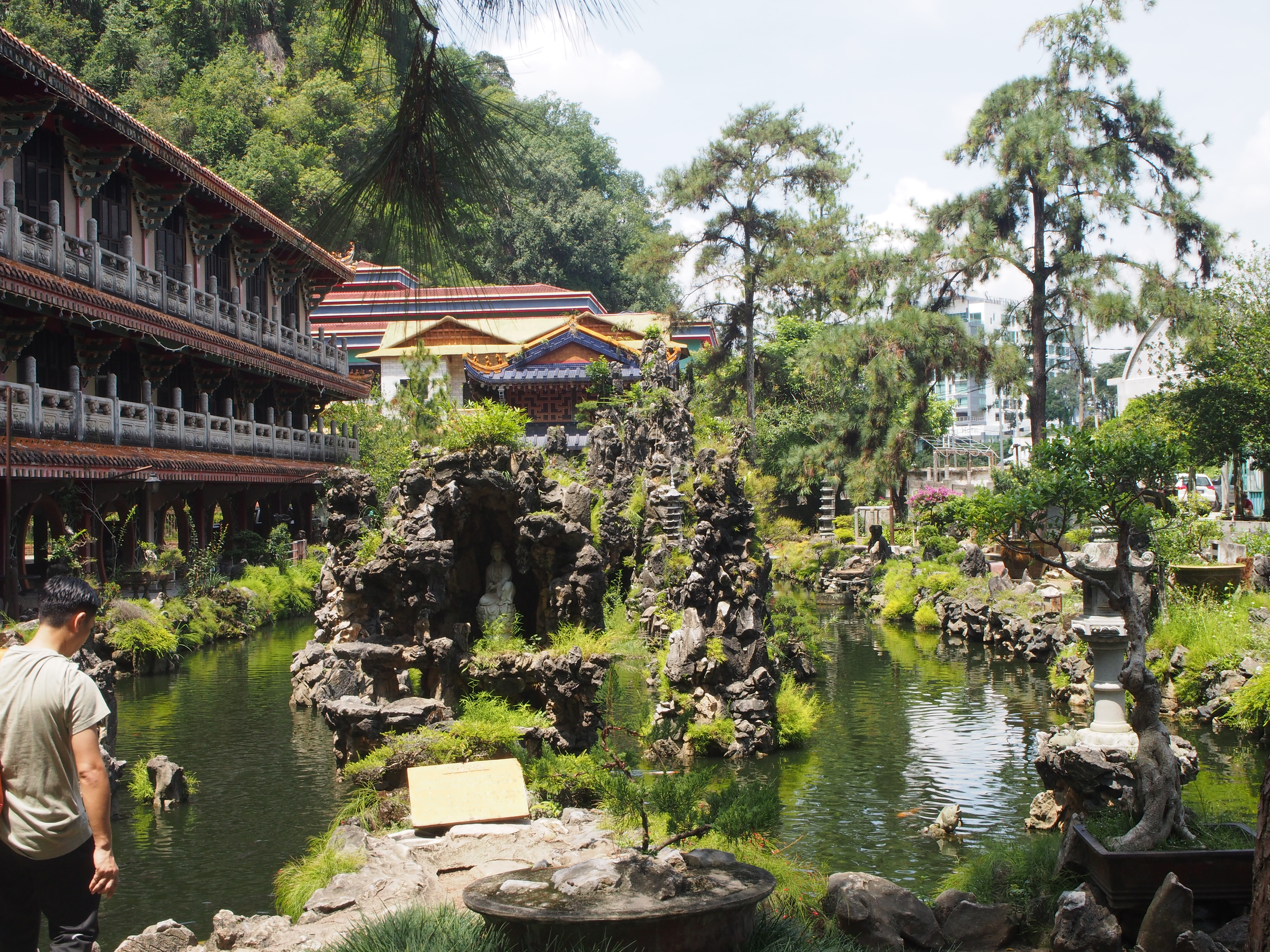
Exterior of temple pavilion

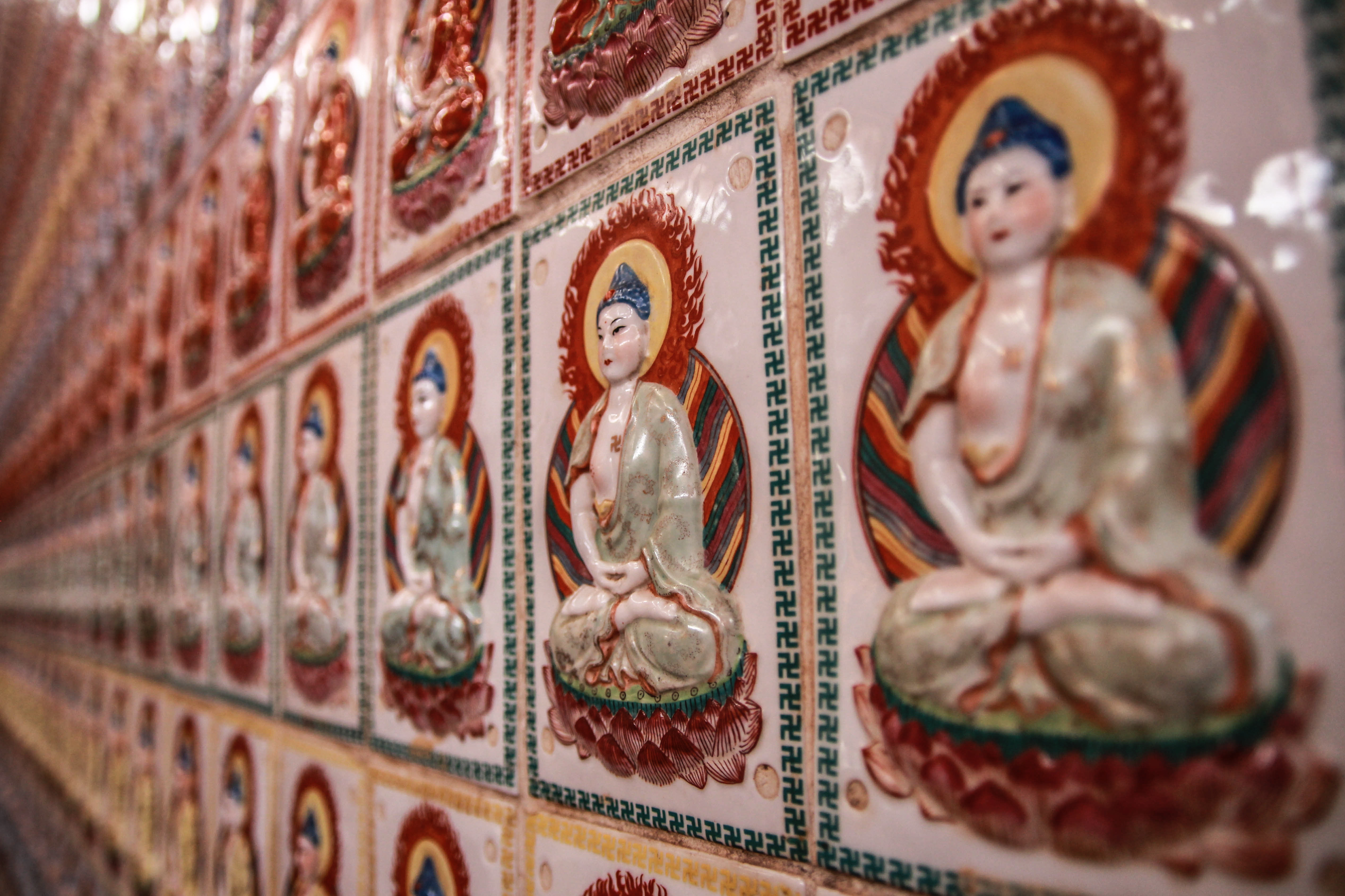
The temple wall.
