= Manjoi =

Town in Ipoh, Perak, Malaysia

Coordinates: 4.615473°N 101.0696968°E

Manjoi or Gugusan Manjoi is a satellite town in Ipoh, Perak, Malaysia. It is considered a major Malay neighbourhood in Peninsular Malaysia second only to the Kampung Baru at the heart of Kuala Lumpur, the nation's capital. Manjoi has mosques and many facilities that are convenient for its residents. It combines several locales/Malay villages (Kampungs). This neighbourhood is under the administration of Mukim Hulu Kinta (Ipoh) of Kinta District.

== Villages ==
These are the Malay Kampungs that are collectively called Gugusan Manjoi:

- Kampung Manjoi
- Kampung Manjoi Baru
- Kampung Manjoi Baru Tambahan
- Kampung Manjoi Lama
- Kampung Tengku Hussein
- Kampung Tengku Hussein Lama
- Kampung Tengku Hussein Hujung
- Kampung Sungai Tapah
- Kampung Sungai Tapah Tambahan
- Kampung Sungai Tapah Hujong
- Kampung Seberang Sungai Tapah
- Kampung Dato' Ahmad Said
- Kampung Dato' Ahmad Said Tambahan (I, II, III)
- Kampung Tersusun Jelapang Baru

== History ==
The village was founded around 1900 by Uda Kidal from Bota, Perak. He and a few of his friends opened a piece of land outside of Ipoh to look for a better life and livelihood. “Manjoi” is named after Uda Kidal's grandfather, Tok Manjoi, a very pious man. Tok Manjoi, whom Uda Kidal was very close to, advised him to care for the area and make sure the settlers did not squabble with one another.

Another version of the story stated that “Manjoi” is derived from Uda Kidal's wife's name, Teh Manja. “Manja” in Parit dialect sounds like “manjé”, which eventually evolved and became “Manjoi”.

Soon, more and more people, especially from Parit and Bota migrated to the area. Kampung Manjoi grew larger and became well known as a Malay settlement in Ipoh. To date, it is the largest Malay settlement in the state of Perak and one of the largest in Malaysia.

== Related links ==
- Kampung Manjoi, Ipoh, Perak
