= Ipoh Town Hall =

Early 19th century building in Ipoh, Malaysia

Coordinates: 4°35′50″N 101°04′19″E

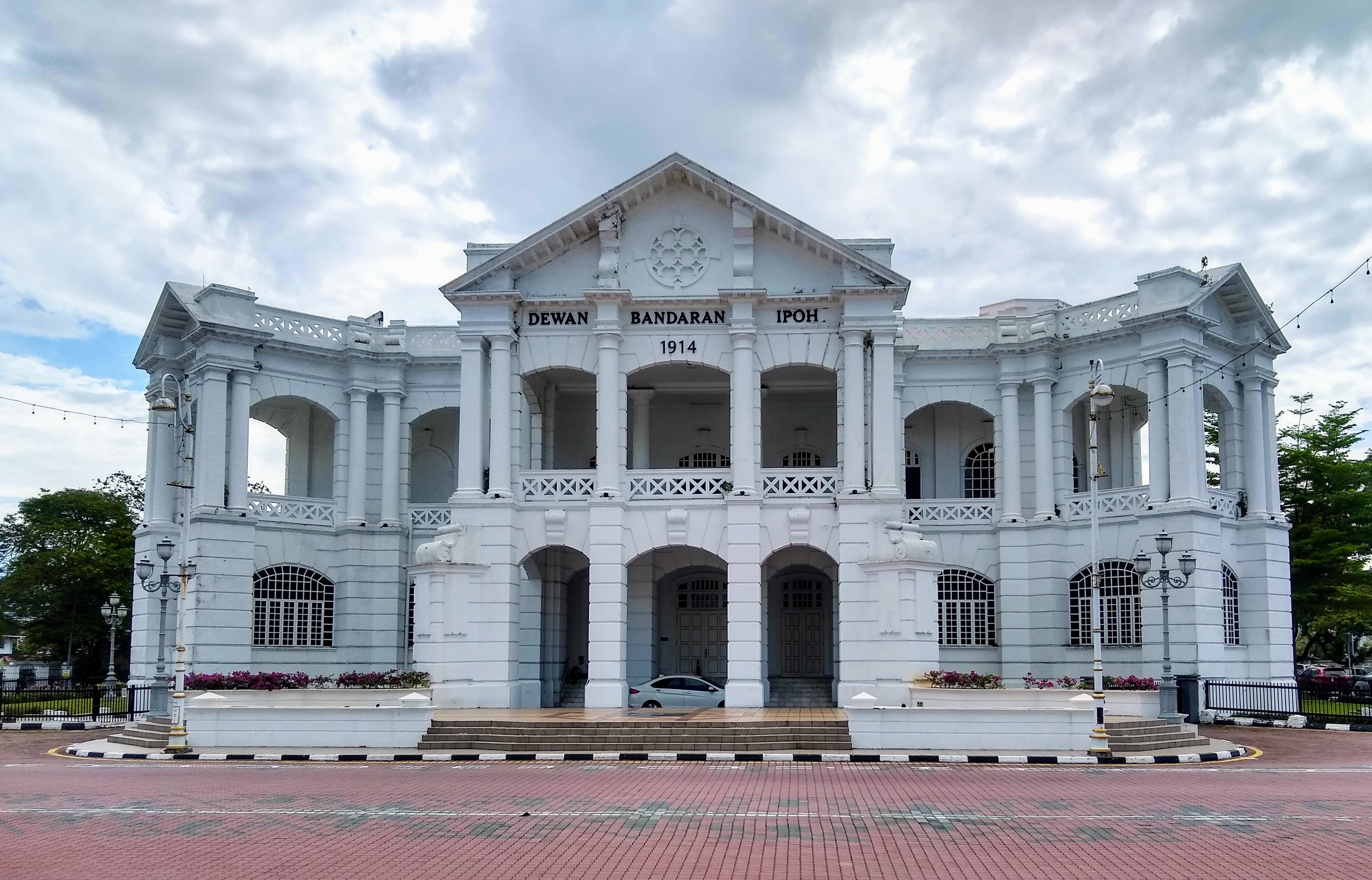

General information
- Architectural style: Neo-Classical
- Address: Jalan Panglima Bukit Gantang Wahab
- Town or city: Ipoh
- Country: Malaysia
- Groundbreaking: 1914
- Completed: 1916
- Owner: Ipoh City Council

Technical details
- Floor count: 2
- Floor area: 6,500 square metres

Design and construction
- Architect(s): Arthur Benison Hubback
- Main contractor: Lim Weng Ching

Ipoh Town Hall is a historic building in Ipoh, Malaysia. Completed in 1916 to the design of Arthur Benison Hubback, it was built to host civic and cultural activities and house the main post office.

== History ==
Ipoh Town Hall can trace its origins back to 1911 when a public meeting decided to lobby the British colonial government to build a town hall as a memorial to the late King Edward VII. Government architect, Hubback was instructed to prepare the design and work commenced in 1914. Completion was delayed until 1916, due to a shortage of labour and materials caused by the First World War.The post office moved into the building in the following year.

The town hall hosted many social and cultural events prior to the Second World War, including concerts, plays, operas, dances and weddings. In the late 1930s, Nobel Laureate Rabindranath Tagore held a symposium in the hall. During the Japanese occupation of Malaya it served as the venue of the ceremony to observe the Japanese emperor's birthday. In December 1945, the Malay Nationalist Party, Malaya's first political party, held its inaugural congress at the town hall.

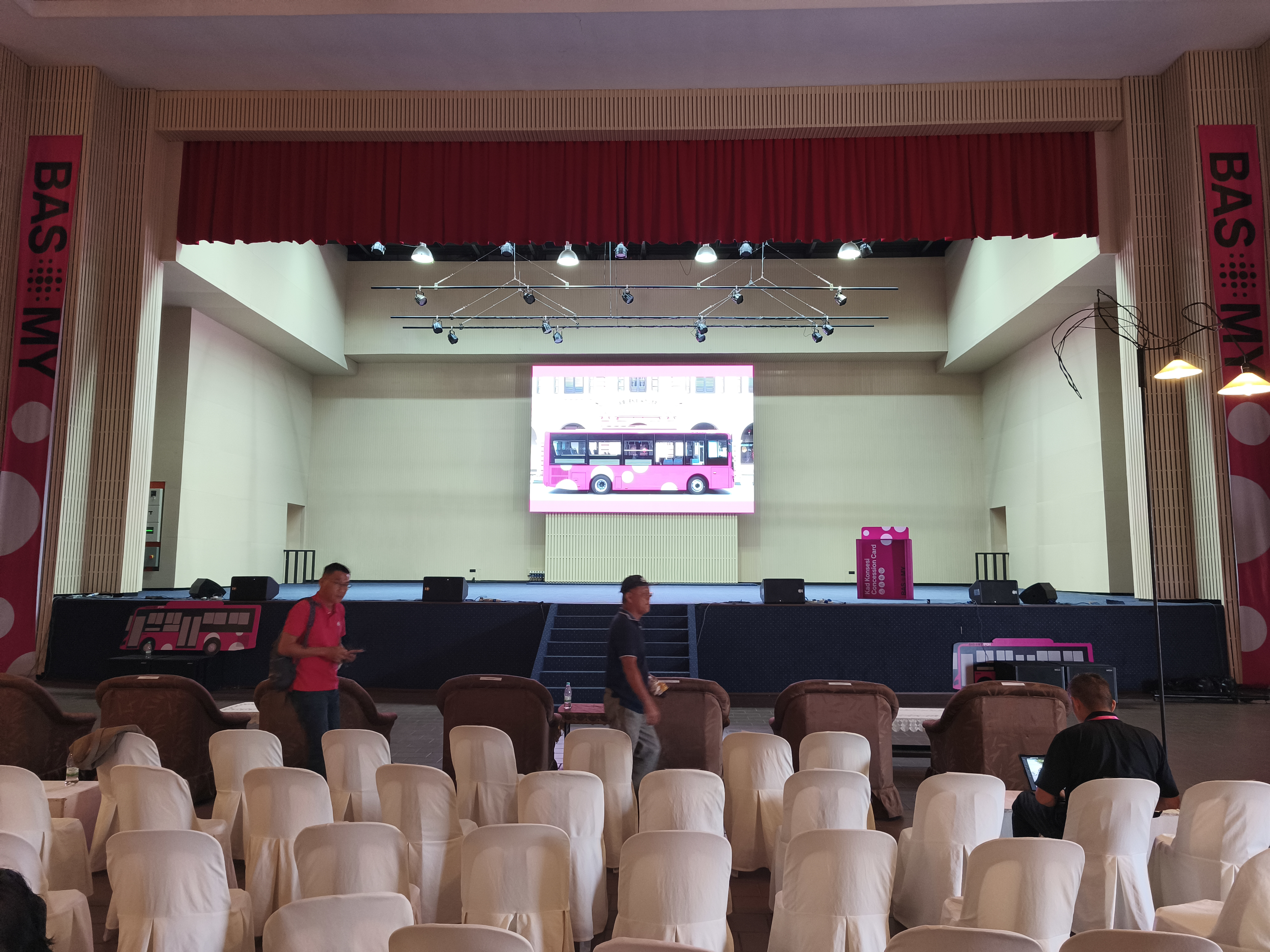
Inside the main hall and stage

In 1948, the Perak State Police, who needed larger premises for their headquarters, took over the building and remained in occupation until it relocated to new premises in the 1960s, and the town hall was used once again as a public auditorium. In 1983, it was occupied by Perak Tourist Information Centre and around the same time postal services moved to a new building next the railway station.

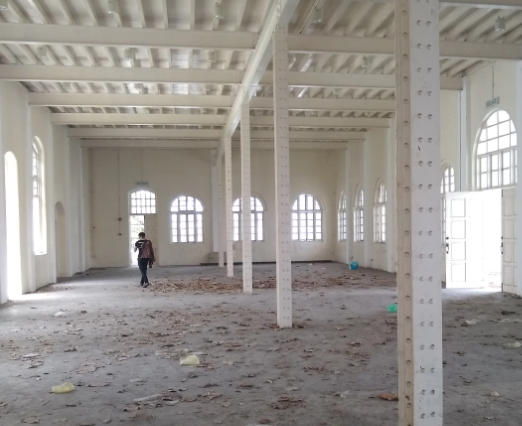
The old post office area at the rear of the building

From 1995, the building remained vacant and became increasingly dilapidated which prompted Ipoh City Council in 2007 to step in to save the building from further decline and, working with the National Heritage Department, it began conservation work in 2009. In 2024, it was reported that the council planned to convert the building into performing arts centre and art gallery.

== Description ==
Designed in the Neo-Classical style by Government Architect, Hubback, who was responsible for many important buildings in Malaya, the building was erected opposite Ipoh railway station and next to the High Court building, both of which he also designed, in the area which was to serve as the centre of the colonial administration in Ipoh.

The building was divided into two sections: the front eastern section facing Ipoh railway station served as the town hall and the rear western section served as the post office and telephone exchange. Consisting of two storeys, the exterior features ionic and doric columns and arches, with a pointed pediment above the main entrance containing circular patterns, with wide verandas on the first floor.

The interior consists of the main hall while on the first floor is a banqueting room, caterer's room and a state room. The main hall, which can accommodate up to 2,000 guests, has a stage with dressing rooms behind. The floor was specially laid for dancing, and the walls are lined with wood panels to improve acoustics. The post office occupied two floors at the rear of the building with the upper floor used by the telephone exchange and the ground floor for postal services.
