= Winnie Loo =

Malaysian entrepreneur (born 1956)

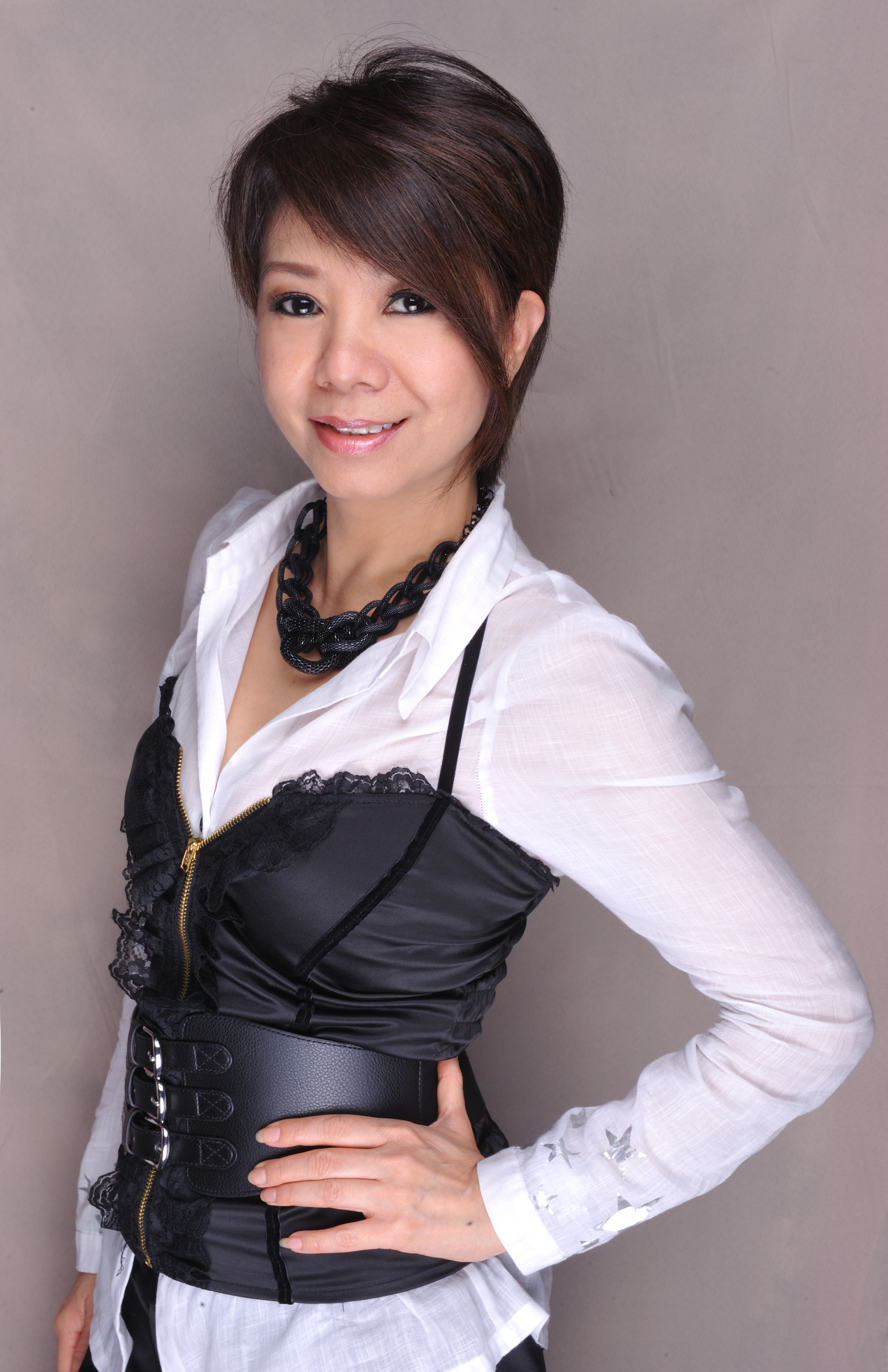
- Director of a A-Cut Above Salon and Academy
- Born: 1956 (age 69–70); Perak, Malaysia

Winnie Loo (born 1956) is a Malaysian hairstylist, entrepreneur, author, and chief executive officer and creative director of A Cut Above Salons.

She is most known for her success with A Cut Above, her chain of high-end salons, as well as her quick cut budget salon chain known as X-Cut.

== Early life ==
Growing up in Ipoh, Malaysia, Winnie Loo was the 8th out of nine children in her family.

From an early age she found intrigue in hair design even though the family business was in tin mining and iron foundries. To please her father, she attended college but after overlooking to sit for an entry exam to university was deferred for 1 year. With the help of her mother, she used this time off to convince her father to allow her to follow her passion as a hairstylist.

== Education ==
In 1976, she went to study at Morris Masterclass, a Vidal Sassoon school of hairdressing, in London. It was here that she studied under Vidal Sassoon.

== Business ventures ==
After returning to Malaysia in 1979 at age 23, Loo was approached in the salon where she was working by a client who wanted to start a business together. In partnership they opened the first A Cut Above salon. The 428 square foot salon was located at Wisma HLA.

After a short partnership, her partner sold Loo her shares. Boyfriend at the time and now husband, Richard Teo became her new business partner. With a background in Marketing and business development, he was able to grow A Cut Above into a well-known salon with over 15 locations throughout Malaysia.

== Family life ==
Together she and her husband Richard Teo have two children, Marcus and Hazel Teo.

Both children have an interest in the Teo family business. Marcus develops product lines for the salon and Hazel is focused on using a background from a fashion course at the Fashion Institute of Design & Merchandising (FIDM) in Los Angeles to introduce a fashion and accessories venture to A Cut Above.

== Awards ==
Loo has been presented with awards for her leadership, entrepreneurship, and innovation. Among these awards are:

- Ernst and Young's Woman Entrepreneur of the Year
- Most Innovative Woman Entrepreneur presented by Women In Leadership Forum Asia
- Most Innovative Woman Entrepreneur presented at the Women in Leadership Forum in Kuala Lumpur

== Social causes ==
Loo is part of an all women's choir called Glitterama. The organization was established in 2006 to provide financial assistance to the needy.

== Publications ==
Winnie Loo authored her autobiography entitled “A Cut Above, Built on Hard Work, True Grit & A Pair of Scissors.” The book was published by Kanyin Publications in 2005.
