= Gunung Rapat =

Suburb of Ipoh, Perak, Malaysia

Coordinates: 4°34′22.2″N 101°06′50.2″E

Gunung Rapat (Jawi: ڬونوڠ راڤت) is a suburb of Ipoh, Perak, Malaysia.
