= Huen Su Yin =

Malaysian cake blogger (born 1985)

- Su Yin in 2007
- Born: Huen Su Yin; September 12, 1985 (age 40); Ipoh, Malaysia
- Other name: Su Yin
- Education: UNSW Sydney; Notter School of Pastry Arts
- Occupation: Founder of Delectable By Su
- Known for: Cake decorating
- Parents: Huen Peng Fatt (father); Lily (mother)
- Website: https://cookingismypassion.blogspot.com/

Huen Su Yin (born 12 September 1985) is a Malaysian blogger and cake designer. She is known for her sculpted cakes, which use cake, fondant and styrofoam to create characters and themes, including her Super Mario cake. She is also known for her face cupcakes.

== Early life and education ==
Huen was born in Ipoh, Malaysia. She attended an all-girls convent school until she completed high school and went to college in Kuala Lumpur for one year. She then enrolled as an International Student at the University of New South Wales studying a Bachelor of Construction Management and Property 2004 to 2007. Between January and June 2008, she studied at the Notter School of Pastry Arts headed by Ewald Notter.

== Career ==
Su Yin's blog was originally started in April 2006 during her time in Sydney. The blog was originally started to chronicle her cooking adventures and culinary experiences, but gained a wider and larger audience when she began creating sculpted cakes. After a year of blogging her blog was ranked within the top 25 Australian Blogs and the top 10 Aussie Cooking Blogs, later reaching the top five of the latter.

After returning to Malaysia, Huen opened a store in Kuala Lumpur, Delectable by Sue, to sell baked goods. In August 2008, Huen established her company 'C.A.K.E' and its brand Delectable, which sells cakes, cupcakes and other baked sweets.

In the latter half of 2008 she catered for Thomas Pink, participated on Cartoon Network Asia for a Ben 10 promotion and created special seasonal cakes for Christmas. She also released an array of cookie compilations for the 2009 Lunar New Year.

In 2016 she wrote a book, How I Built My Cake Shops: A Delectable Story.

While Su Yin did not invent the face manner of decorating cupcakes, she is well known for them. Her method of using fondant to cover a cupcake then creating a face on the top was featured in Girlfriend magazine and various non-cooking related web sites.

== Gallery ==
The Super Mario cake

Su Yin and Ewald Notter at her graduation
