= Hovid (company) =

Malaysian health care and pharmaceutical company

- Formerly: Ho Yan Hor Sdn Bhd
- Type: Public limited company
- Traded as: MYX: 7213
- ISIN: MYL7213OO001
- Industry: Pharmaceutical, health care
- Founded: 1980
- Headquarters: 121, Jalan Tunku Abdul Rahman, 30010 Ipoh, Perak, Malaysia
- Key people: Ho Sue San @ David Ho Sue San, Managing Director & Chairman
- Website: www.hovid.com

Hovid Berhad (Chinese: 何人可有限公司; MYX: 7213) is a Malaysian health care provider and pharmaceutical company. It was founded in the early 1940s. The company's headquarters are located in Ipoh, the capital city of Perak state, Malaysia. It was formerly known as Ho Yan Hor Sdn Bhd (Chinese: 何人可私人有限公司).

Hovid manufactures primarily generic drugs such as antihistamines, antibiotics, tranquilizers, analgesics, antacids, and diuretics. It also manufactures dietary supplements. Hovid's products are Halal certified.

Hovid's research and development activities focus on special delivery systems, bio-availability and enhanced formulations. The company is increasing its efforts in developing pharmaceuticals with unique delivery systems.

Hovid Berhad was publicly listed on the second board of Kuala Lumpur Stock Exchange (KLSE) on April 5, 2005 and was transferred to the main board on June 20, 2006.

Hovid's products are marketed in more than 50 countries. The company claims it was the first to introduce Malaysian generic drugs overseas in the 1990s.

== History ==
The company was founded by Ho Kai Cheong. Its first product was Ho Yan Hor Herbal Tea, a Chinese herbal tea recipe made of 24 herbs. In the 1980s, the company transformed from a traditional Chinese herbal manufacturer to generic drugs, health supplements and consumer health care products. The company began focusing on tocotrienol research and development in the 2000s.

Ho (Chinese: 何继昌博士) formulated the tea in the early 1940s. He started to sell boiled herbal teas in front of his shop and residence. It was a popular alternative to western medicine during the after World War II. Few Malaysians had the funds to pay a doctor during illness, and chose traditional ways to seek recovery.

In the 1970s, Ho sent his eldest son, David Ho Sue San to New Zealand to pursue a degree in pharmacology. After graduating, David went to Wyeth in the United Kingdom to work as a research pharmacist for two years. He returned to Malaysia in 1980 and took over his father's business, modernizing the manufacturing process of the herbal tea. David then founded Hovid Berhad and introduced the line of pharmaceuticals.
