= Chan Kok Heng =

Malaysian footballer

Personal information
- Full name: Chan Kok Heng
- Date of birth: 21 April 1968 (age 58)
- Place of birth: Perak, Malaysia
- Position: Defender

Senior career*
Years	Team	Apps	(Gls)
1988–2004	Perak FA		
- * Club domestic league appearances and goals

Chan Kok Heng (born 21 April 1968) is a former Malaysian footballer who primarily associated as a defender with Perak FA. He was the longest serving player after playing for more than ten seasons. He retired from professional football in 2004.

He played and selected by Perak FA since the semi-pro era in 1988, and retired from the squad in year 2004 after played 16 season for Perak. During his time with Perak, he won Malaysia FA Cup, Malaysia Cup and Malaysia Premier League One titles. After retiring professionally, he played for PCRC (Perak Chinese Recreation Club) as a defender and played in Ipoh Premier League. His team won the second place at the end of season 2008.
