= Ipoh North–Ipoh South Local Express Lane =

Road in Malaysia

Federal Route 239
- Ipoh North–Ipoh South Local Express Lane; Jalan Ampang–Jelapang (North bound)

Route information
- Maintained by Malaysian Public Works Department
- Length: 7.31 km (4.54 mi)
- Existed: 2007–present
- History: Completed in 2009

Major junctions
- South end: Ipoh South Toll Plaza; North–South Expressway Northern Route / AH2
- A13 Jalan Tambun; Jalan Sultan Azlan Shah Utara; FT 1 Jalan Kuala Kangsar; Persiaran Meru Raya; Jalan Jelapang; North–South Expressway Northern Route / AH2
- North end: Ipoh North Toll Plaza; North–South Expressway Northern Route / AH2

Location
- Country: Malaysia
- Primary destinations: Jelapang, Bandar Meru Raya, Chemor, Ipoh, Bercham, Tambun, Tanjung Rambutan

Highway system
- Highways in Malaysia; Expressways; Federal; State

Federal Route 240
- Ipoh North–Ipoh South Local Express Lane; Jalan Jelapang–Ampang (South bound)

Route information
- Maintained by Malaysian Public Works Department
- Length: 7.01 km (4.36 mi)
- Existed: 2007–present
- History: Completed in 2009

Major junctions
- North end: Ipoh North Toll Plaza; North–South Expressway Northern Route / AH2
- North–South Expressway Northern Route / AH2; Jalan Jelapang; Persiaran Meru Raya; FT 1 Jalan Kuala Kangsar; Jalan Sultan Azlan Shah Utara; A13 Jalan Tambun
- South end: Ipoh South Toll Plaza; North–South Expressway Northern Route / AH2

Location
- Country: Malaysia
- Primary destinations: Jelapang, Bandar Meru Raya, Chemor, Ipoh, Bercham, Tambun, Tanjung Rambutan

Highway system
- Highways in Malaysia; Expressways; Federal; State

The Ipoh North–Ipoh South Local Express Lane, or Jalan Jelapang–Ampang (based on Waze social GPS-map applications), Federal Route 239 (northbound) and 240 (southbound), are toll-free local-express lanes in the North–South Expressway Northern Route E1 in Ipoh, Perak, Malaysia.

There are five interchange along the local express lane, Jelapang, Meru Raya, Ipoh North, Ipoh South and Tambun.

== History ==
The Jelapang and Ipoh South toll plazas were demolished in 2009 to make a non-stop route across Ipoh. This is achieved through the construction of two local-express lanes for each side, which are only accessible via Exit 138 Ipoh South Exit (for northbound traffic) and Exit 141 Ipoh North Exit (for southbound traffic). The toll plazas in Ipoh were relocated to each end of the local-express lanes.

The decision to demolish both toll plazas was made as a result of accidents which happened at Jelapang toll plaza. Since the toll plaza was opened on 28 September 1987, there were many accident cases which involved brake failure in heavy vehicles due to hard braking when proceeding downhill to the toll plaza. On 7 June 2008, the new Ipoh North toll plaza (South bound) replacing old Jelapang toll plaza opened to traffic, followed by northbound on 15 August 2008. Since 14 July 2009, the Johor Bahru-Kuala Lumpur–Penang through traffic has been open to traffic. With the opening of the 14.7-kilometre (9.1 mi) between Ipoh North (Jelapang) and Ipoh South stretch, highway users are no longer required to stop for toll transactions at the Ipoh North and Ipoh South Toll Plazas.

In 2014, the Ipoh North–Ipoh South Local Express Lane were gazetted as Federal Route 239 for northbound and Federal Route 240 for southbound.

== Features ==
At most sections, the Federal Route 239 and 240 was built under the JKR R5 road standard, allowing maximum speed limit of up to 90 km/h.

== Interchange lists ==
The entire route is located in Kinta District, Perak.

Legend:

- I/C - Interchange, I/S - Intersection, RSA - Rest and service area, OBR - Overhead bridge restaurant, R/R - Restaurant and rest plaza, L/B - Layby, V/P - Vista point, TN - tunnel, T/P - Toll plaza, BR - Bridge
- C - Cloverleaf, S - Stack, T-A - Trumpet-A, T-B - Trumpet-B, DT - Directional-T/Y, SDT - Semi-Directional-T/Y, P-Y - Partial-Y, D - Diamond, P-C - Partial cloverleaf, D-D - Diverging diamond, D-R - Direct ramp

=== FT239 Jalan Ampang–Jelapang ===
Km	Exit	Name	Destinations	Notes
Through from North–South Expressway Northern Route / AH2 northbound
	T/P	Ipoh South Toll Plaza (Northbound)	Touch 'n Go SmartTAG MyRFID	
	BR	Sungai Pinji bridge		
	I/C	Tambun I/C	A13 Jalan Tambun – Ipoh City Centre, Tambun, Sunway City Ipoh, Tanjung Rambutan, Hospital Bahagia Ulu Kinta	Interchange
	I/C	Ipoh South I/C	Jalan Sultan Azlan Shah Utara – Bercham, Tanjung Rambutan, Hospital Bahagia Ulu Kinta , Ipoh City Centre	Diamond interchange with T-junctions
	BR	Sungai Kinta bridge		
	BR	Railway crossing bridge		
	I/C	Ipoh North I/C	FT 1 Jalan Kuala Kangsar – Kuala Kangsar, Sungai Siput, Ipoh City Centre	Diamond interchange
	BR	Sungai Pari bridge		
	I/C	Meru Raya I/C	Persiaran Meru Raya – Bandar Meru Raya (North), Chemor, Bandar Meru Raya (South), Jelapang	Diamond interchange
	I/C	Jelapang I/C	Jalan Jelapang – Chemor, Jelapang, Bandar Seri Iskandar, Lumut, Pangkor Island	Northbound only
	T/P	Ipoh North Toll Plaza (Northbound)	Touch 'n Go SmartTAG MyRFID	
Through to North–South Expressway Northern Route / AH2 northbound

=== FT240 Jalan Jelapang–Ampang ===
Km	Exit	Name	Destinations	Notes
Through from North–South Expressway Northern Route / AH2 southbound
		Runaway truck ramp		Southbound only
	T/P	Ipoh North Toll Plaza (Southbound)	Touch 'n Go SmartTAG MyRFID	
	I/C	Meru Raya I/C	Persiaran Meru Raya – Bandar Meru Raya (North), Chemor, Bandar Meru Raya (South), Jelapang	Diamond interchange
	BR	Sungai Pari bridge		
	I/C	Ipoh North I/C	FT 1 Jalan Kuala Kangsar – Kuala Kangsar, Sungai Siput, Ipoh City Centre	Diamond interchange
	BR	Railway crossing bridge		
	BR	Sungai Kinta bridge		
	I/C	Ipoh South I/C	Jalan Sultan Azlan Shah Utara – Bercham, Tanjung Rambutan, Hospital Bahagia Ulu Kinta , Ipoh City Centre	Diamond interchange with T-junctions
	I/C	Tambun I/C	A13 Jalan Tambun – Ipoh City Centre, Tambun, Sunway City Ipoh, Tanjung Rambutan, Hospital Bahagia Ulu Kinta	Interchange
	BR	Sungai Pinji bridge		
	T/P	Ipoh South Toll Plaza (Southbound)	Touch 'n Go SmartTAG MyRFID	
Through to North–South Expressway Northern Route / AH2 southbound
