= Perak State Route A13 =

Road in Malaysia

Perak Route 13
- Jalan Tambun

Major junctions
- Northwest end: Chemor
- FT 1 Federal route 1
- Southwest end: Ipoh; Bulatan Tambun

Location
- Country: Malaysia
- Primary destinations: Tanjung Rambutan; Bercham; Tambun; Sunway City Ipoh

Highway system
- Highways in Malaysia; Expressways; Federal; State

Jalan Tambun (Perak state route A13) is a major road in Perak, Malaysia. It is considered known as Ipoh Outer Ring Road.

== List of junctions ==
Km	Exit	Junctions	To	Remarks
		Chemor	North; FT 1 Kuala Kangsar; FT 1 Sungai Siput; FT 1 Kanthan West; A1 Jalan Jelapang; Jelapang; North–South Expressway Northern Route AH2 North–South Expressway Northern Route; Bukit Kayu Hitam; Penang South; FT 1 Ipoh; FT 1 Bercham; North–South Expressway Northern Route AH2 North–South Expressway Northern Route; Kuala Lumpur; Tapah	Junctions
		Kampung Encik Zainal	North; A160 Jalan Kuang Perak; Kuang	T-junctions
		Kampung Tersusun Tanah Hitam		
		Taman Kinding Raya		
		Taman Bahagia		
		Kampung Kolam		
		Tanjung Rambutan	Tanjung Rambutan railway station	
		Hospital Bahagia Tanjung Rambutan		
		Kampung Masjid		
		Sungai Kinta bridge		
		Taman Sungai Kinta		
		Jalan Bercham	Southwest; A183 Jalan Bercham; Bercham	T-junctions
		Taman Permai Jaya	Taman Permai Jaya; Kampung Lim Tang	T-junctions
		Taman Sun Brite Jaya		
		Taman Indah		
		Kampung Tersusun Batu Lapan	East; A182 Jalan Air Terjun Tanjung Rambutan; Tanjung Rambutan waterfall	T-junctions
		Taman Bistari		
		Taman Perpaduan	West; Jalan Perpaduan; Bercham	T-junctions
		Sunway City Ipoh	The Lost World of Tambun	
		Kampung Tersusun Batu Enam Tambun		
		Bandar Baru Tambun	West; Lebuh Bandar Baru Tambun; Jalan Perajurit	T-junctions
		Taman Tambun Permai		
		Tambun	South; Jalan Ampang Baru 6	T-junctions
		Taman Tambun		
		Jalan Tasek	North; Jalan Tasek; Tasek; Bercham; North–South Expressway Northern Route AH2 North–South Expressway Northern Route; Bukit Kayu Hitam; Penang; Kuala Lumpur South; Jalan Sultan Azlan Shah; Simpang Pulai; Gopeng; Sultan Azlan Shah Airport	Junctions
		Taman Ipoh		
		Taman Jepun	Ipoh Turf Club	T-junctions
		Ipoh; Bulatan Tambun	West; Jalan Sultan Iskandar; Ipoh city centre Southeast; FT 1 Jalan Raja Dr Nazrin Shah; Simpang Pulai; Gopeng; Sultan Azlan Shah Airport	Roundabout
