= Jelapang =

Jelapang may refer to:

- Jelapang, Perak, town in Malaysia
- Jelapang LRT station, in Singapore
- Jalan Jelapang, Perak state route
- Jelapang (state constituency)
