= Perak State Route A1 =

Road in Malaysia

Perak Route 1
- Jalan Jelapang

Major junctions
- North end: Chemor
- A13 State Route A13; FT 1 Federal Route 1 North–South Expressway Northern Route / AH2; FT 5 Ipoh–Lumut Highway
- South end: Ipoh

Location
- Country: Malaysia
- Primary destinations: Jelapang, Silibin

Highway system
- Highways in Malaysia; Expressways; Federal; State

Jalan Jelapang, Perak State Route A1 is a major road in Perak, Malaysia. It is also known as Ipoh Outer Ring Road.

== Junction lists ==
The entire route is located in Kinta District, Perak.

Legend:

- I/C - Interchange, I/S - Intersection, RSA - Rest and service area, OBR - Overhead bridge restaurant, R/R - Restaurant and rest plaza, L/B - Layby, V/P - Vista point, TN - tunnel, T/P - Toll plaza, BR - Bridge
- C - Cloverleaf, S - Stack, T-A - Trumpet-A, T-B - Trumpet-B, DT - Directional-T/Y, SDT - Semi-Directional-T/Y, P-Y - Partial-Y, D - Diamond, P-C - Partial cloverleaf, D-D - Diverging diamond, D-R - Direct ramp

Location	km	mi	Name	Destinations	Notes
Chemor			Chemor	FT 1 Malaysia Federal Route 1 – Kuala Kangsar, Sungai Siput, Kanthan, Bercham, Ipoh; A13 Perak State Route A13 – Tambun, Tanjung Rambutan, Hospital Bahagia, Tanjung Rambutan waterfall	Junctions
Chemor			Taman Hartawan		
Chemor			Kampung Kuala Kuang		
Chemor			Kampung Tambahan Ulu Chepor		
Chemor			Kampung Ulu Chepor		
Chemor			Taman Mas		
Meru			Persiaran Meru Raya	Persiaran Meru Raya – Bandar Meru Raya; North–South Expressway Northern Route / AH2 – Kuala Lumpur, Gopeng, Simpang Pulai	T-junctions
Meru			Ipoh North-NSE (formerly Jelapang-NSE)	North–South Expressway Northern Route / AH2 – Bukit Kayu Hitam, Penang, Kuala Kangsar	Junctions
Meru			Taman Meru Jaya		
Meru			Taman Jati		
Meru			Taman Meru	Jalan Bukit Meru – Taman Meru, Taman Bukit Meru	T-junctions
Jelapang			Jelapang–ILH	FT 5 Ipoh–Lumut Highway – Sitiawan, Lumut, Pangkor Island	T-junctions
Jelapang			Jelapang		
Jelapang			Kampung Majoi Tambahan		
Jelapang			Taman Sri Wan		
Jelapang			Silibin	Jalan Silibin; FT 5 Ipoh–Lumut Highway – Sitiawan, Lumut, Pangkor Island; Jalan Raja Perempuan Mazwin – Taman Rishah	Roundabout
Ipoh			Jalan King Song Teik	Jalan King Song Teik – Kampung Kacang Puteh	T-junctions
Ipoh			Taman Maxwell		
Ipoh			Kampung Kastam	Jalan Ng Weng Hup – Guntong	T-junctions
Ipoh			Sungai Pari bridge		
Ipoh			Jalan Tun Abdul Razak	Jalan Tun Abdul Razak	Junctions
Ipoh			Jalan Tun Perak	Jalan Tun Perak	Junctions
Ipoh			Railway crossing bridge		
Ipoh			Ipoh	FT 1 Malaysia Federal Route 1 – Kuala Kangsar, Sungai Siput, Chemor; Jalan Leong Boon Swee – Simpang Pulai, Gopeng; North–South Expressway Northern Route / AH2 – Kuala Lumpur, Tapah; FT 5 Ipoh–Lumut Highway (through Jalan Lahat) – Menglembu, Bota, Sitiawan, Lumut, Pangkor Island	Roundabout
1.000 mi = 1.609 km; 1.000 km = 0.621 mi
