= Perak State Route A183 =

Road in Malaysia

Perak Route 183
- Jalan Bercham

Major junctions
- Southwest end: Tasek
- Jalan Tasek; A13 Jalan Tambun
- Northeast end: Tanjung Rambutan

Location
- Country: Malaysia
- Primary destinations: Bercham

Highway system
- Highways in Malaysia; Expressways; Federal; State

Jalan Bercham (Perak state route A183) is a major road in Perak, Malaysia.

== List of junctions ==
| Km | Exit | Junctions | To | Remarks |
|---|---|---|---|---|
| | | Tasek | Jalan Tasek; North; Chemor; Sungai Siput; Kuala Kangsar South; Ipoh; Simpang Pulai; Gopeng; North–South Expressway Southern Route AH2 North–South Expressway Northern Route; Bukit Kayu Hitam; Penang; Kuala Lumpur | T-junctions |
| | | Tasek Dermawan | | |
| | | Bercham | East; Persiaran Bercham Timur 10; Jalan Perpaduan; Tambun | Junctions |
| | | Taman Restu | | |
| | | Taman Restu Jaya | | |
| | | Taman Mujur | | |
| | | Laluan Hulu Bercham 1 | South; Laluan Hulu Bercham 1 | T-junctions |
| | | Tanjung Rambutan | A13 Jalan Tambun; Chemor; Hospital Bahagia; South; Tambun; Tanjung Rambutan waterfall | T-junctions |
