= Miss Universe Malaysia 1967 =

Miss Malaysia 1967, the 4th edition of the Miss Universe Malaysia, was held on 2 July 1967 at the Asrama Perak, Tambun, Ipoh, Perak. Monkam Siprasome (also known as Anne Low) of Kedah was crowned by the consort of the Sultan of Perak, Che Puan Negara Raja Muzwin Raja Arif Shah at the end of the event. She then represented Malaysia at the Miss Universe 1967 pageant in Miami, Florida.

== Results ==
Final result	Delegate
Miss Malaysia 1967	Kedah – Monkam Siprasome
1st Runner-Up	Johore – Maznah Mohamed Ali
2nd Runner-Up	Trengganu – Ramlah Alang

== Delegate ==
10 delegates competed for the crown and title.

- Johore – Maznah Mohamed Ali
- Kedah – Monkam Siprasome
- Kelantan – Bibby Lim
- Melaka – Theresa Sta Maria
- Negri Sembilan – Aishah Mohamed Naina
- Pahang – Margaret Yee
- Penang – Nancy Neoh (did not compete)
- Perak – Yim Chee Moi
- Perlis – Julie Chang (did not compete due to illness)
- Sabah – Angeline Leong
- Sarawak – Senorita Linang (failed to turn up)
- Selangor – Edema Elizabeth Winfred
- Trengganu – Ramlah Alang
