= Local–express lanes =

Arrangement of carriageways within a major highway

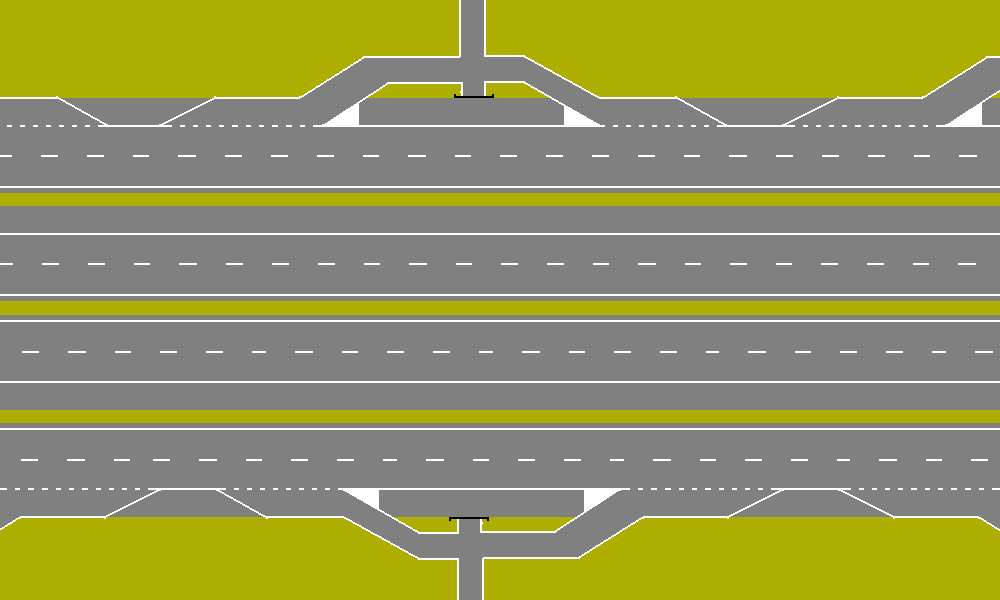
System with four roadways/carriageways, where access ways primarily connect with the outer roadways. Through traffic on the inner carriageways can flow without interruption.

The local–express lane system is an arrangement of carriageways within a major highway where long distance traffic can use inner express lanes with fewer interchanges compared to local traffic which use outer local lanes that have access to all interchanges. This can also be called a collector/distributor lane system within a single interchange. One of the longest examples is Highway 401 in Toronto, where highway ramps between express and local lanes cross over one another; these are commonly known as braided ramps and in Toronto as a basketweave.

Some places may have only three carriageways on the highway instead of four, utilizing one directional express lanes. They may be permanent, or they can be reversible express lanes such as in Seattle where they alternate direction.

While the terms "local–express system" and "collector/distributor system" are often used interchangeably, some transportation departments make a distinction between the two. In a local–express system, the inner lanes are called express lanes whereas the outer lanes are called local lanes. In a collector/distributor system, the inner lanes are called mainlines while the outer lanes are called collector/distributor lanes. Generally speaking, a local–express system will have the extra outer lanes present for a long duration of the highway, as opposed to a collector/distributor system where the extra outer lanes are only present at an interchange.

== Examples ==
The following examples include both local–express and collector/distributor lane systems.

=== Canada ===
| Province | Highway | City/Region | Location | Length | Notes |
|---|---|---|---|---|---|
| Alberta | Highway 2 | Edmonton | 178 St – 170 St | 1.2 km (0.75 mi) | Whitemud Drive |
| Alberta | Highway 2 Highway 14 | Edmonton | 111 St - 99 St | 2.1 km (1.3 mi) | Whitemud Drive; Hwy 2 111 St from to Gateway Boulevard; Hwy 14 from Gateway Boulevard to 99 St |
| Alberta | Highway 63 | Fort McMurray | MacDonald Drive – Confederation Way | 5 km (3.1 mi) | northbound only |
| Alberta | Highway 201 | Calgary | Scenic Acres Link – Nose Hill Drive | 2.5 km (1.6 mi) | Stoney Trail |
| Alberta | Highway 1A | Calgary | Northland Drive – Shaganappi Trail (NB), Shaganappi Trail – Brisebois Dr (SB) | 2 km (1.2 mi) | Crowchild Trail |
| Alberta | Highway 1A | Calgary | Dalham Crescent (LRT) – 53 St | 1 km (0.62 mi) | Crowchild Trail |
| British Columbia | Highway 1 | Coquitlam and Surrey | Cape Horn Interchange – 152nd Street | 5.4 km (3.4 mi) | Connects to the Port Mann Bridge. Express carriageways contain an HOV lane each. |
| British Columbia | Highway 99 | Delta | Highway 99 between Hwy 17 – Hwy 17A | 2.70 km (1.68 mi) | Westbound traffic only, ends near the start of reversible lane gates for Massey Tunnel. Local lanes include an HOV lane. Access to reversible lane for Westbound traffic only from express lanes. |
| Nova Scotia | Hwy 118 | Dartmouth | Exit 12 | 2.2 km (1.4 mi) | southbound only |
| Ontario | Highway 400 | York Region | Highway 7 interchange – south of Langstaff Road | 3.0 km (1.9 mi) | signed as exits to Highway 7 and Langstaff Road rather than collector–express |
| Ontario | Highway 401 | Toronto and Durham Region | east of Kipling Avenue (Highway 409 interchange) – Brock Road, Pickering | 44 km (27 mi) | Primary system first completed from Islington to Markham Road in 1972, Brock Road in 1997. Longest local-express system in Canada. |
| Ontario | Highway 401 | Peel Region | Winston Churchill Boulevard – Highway 427 | 9.6 km (6.0 mi) | originally ended at Highway 403 in 1980s, extended to just east of Kennedy Road in early 1990s, extended further westward to Hurontario Street in late-2000s, construction presently underway to complete it just west of Mississauga Road by early 2020s |
| Ontario | Highway 401 | Halton Region | James Snow Parkway - Highway 407 | 4.6 km (2.9 mi) | Built as a separate stretch due to the 407 overpass not being wide enough for a continuous collector-express system underneath. Completed early 2020s. |
| Ontario | Highway 403 | Peel Region | Highway 401 / Highway 410 interchange – Cawthra Road | 3.4 km (2.1 mi) | Completed 1994 |
| Ontario | Highway 404 | Toronto | Highway 401 – just north of Sheppard Avenue East | 1.8 km (1.1 mi) | 401 eastbound to 404 northbound ramp express lane (no access to Sheppard Avenue offramp) completed 2001, southbound collector lanes completed 2005 |
| Ontario | Highway 410 | Peel Region | Highway 401 / Highway 403 interchange – Courtneypark Drive | 1.8 km (1.1 mi) | northbound only, access to the express from the 403 only |
| Ontario | Highway 410 | Peel Region | Highway 407 – Courtneypark Drive | 2.0 km (1.3 mi) | southbound only; signed as exits to Derry Road and Courtneypark Drive rather than collector–express. Opened June 2022 |
| Ontario | Highway 427 | Toronto | Queen Elizabeth Way / Gardiner Expressway – Highway 401 | 6.8 km (4.2 mi) | |
| Ontario | Conestoga Parkway | Kitchener | Lancaster Street – Krug Street | 2.3 km (1.4 mi) | |
| Ontario | Gardiner Expressway (formerly QEW) | Toronto | Wickman Road (west of Kipling Avenue) – Royal York Road | 2.7 km (1.7 mi) | |
| Quebec | A-13 | Laval | Throughout the city of Laval | 8.6 km (5.3 mi) | |
| Quebec | A-40 | Repentigny | Larochelle Boulevard – Industrial Boulevard | 4.3 km (2.7 mi) | Exit 98 and Exit 100, with a single transfer in between |
| Quebec | A-40 | Repentigny | R-341 – R-343 | 4.2 km (2.6 mi) | eastbound only |
| Quebec | A-40 | West Island | Ste Marie Road- A-520 | 18.4 km (11.4 mi) | |
| Quebec | A-440 | Laval | A-13 - East of Industrial Boulevard | 8.1 km (5.0 mi) | |

=== United States ===
| State | Highway | City/Region | Location | Length | Notes |
|---|---|---|---|---|---|
| California | I-5 (Santa Ana Freeway) | Santa Ana | Orange Crush Interchange (SR 22 / SR 57) – Main Street | 1.1 miles (1.8 km) | southbound only |
| California | I-5 (Santa Ana/San Diego Freeway) | Irvine | Lake Forest Drive – Irvine Center Drive | 2.2 miles (3.5 km) | El Toro Y (Junction I-405) |
| California | I-5 (San Diego Freeway) | Sorrento Valley, San Diego | I-805 – SR 56 | 2.5 miles (4.0 km) | signed local–express lane system |
| California | I-10 (Santa Monica Freeway) | Los Angeles | I-110 / SR 110 – Arlington Avenue | 2.4 miles (3.9 km) | |
| California | I-805 (Jacob Dekema Freeway) | Chula Vista | H Street – E Street / Bonita Road | 0.9 miles (1.4 km) | northbound only |
| California | US 101 (Bayshore Freeway) | San Mateo County | near San Francisco International Airport | 1.7 miles (2.7 km) | |
| California | SR 87 (Guadalupe Parkway) | | I-280 – Julian Street along Downtown San Jose | 1.2 miles (1.9 km) | northbound |
| California | SR 87 (Guadalupe Parkway) | | I-280 – Alma Avenue | 0.7 miles (1.1 km) | southbound |
| California | SR 125 | El Cajon | Navajo Road – Grossmont College Drive | 0.6 miles (0.97 km) | collector-distributor system |
| California | SR 180 | Fresno | SR 41 / SR 168 interchanges | 1.1 miles (1.8 km) | This interchange is unusual because it also allows traffic to flow directly between SR 41 and SR 168 bypassing SR 180, making it in effect a double braided ramp. www.dot.ca.gov Google Maps |
| Florida | I-295 | Jacksonville | Between Collins Road and Roosevelt Boulevard/US-17 | 3.4 miles (5.47 km) | |
| Georgia | I-85 | Gwinnett County | Exit 104 – Exit 109 | 5.4 miles (8.7 km) | collector-distributor system |
| Georgia | I-85 / I-285 | Fulton County | Between Georgia State Route 14 and split of I-85 and I-285. | 1.0 mile (1.6 km) | Dual express carriageways and CD road for local exits |
| Georgia | US 80 / SR 22 / SR 540 (Fall Line Freeway) | Columbus | Between Interstate 185 and Moon Road | 2.3 miles (3.7 km) | collector-distributor system |
| Illinois | I-90 / I-94 (Kennedy Expressway) | Chicago | Ohio Street – Edens Expressway | 7.0 miles (11.3 km) | reversible express lane |
| Illinois | I-90 / I-94 (Dan Ryan Expressway) | Chicago | 71st Street – I-55 | 5.5 miles (8.9 km) | signed local–express lane system; no trucks are allowed in the express lanes |
| Illinois | IL 53 | Rolling Meadows | I-290 – Kirchhoff Road | 2.1 miles (3.4 km) | local–express format |
| Iowa | I-29 / I-80 | Council Bluffs | I-80 Exit 1 to Exit 4 | 3.12 miles (5.02 km) | signed local–express lane system; dual-divided freeway format |
| Kansas | K-10 | Lenexa | K-10 Exit to Interstate 435 East, Lackman Road & Interstate 35 | 2.18 miles (3.51 km) | Dual-divided freeway format |
| Maryland | I-95 (Express toll lanes) | Baltimore County | White Marsh – Baltimore | 7.6 miles (12.2 km) | signed local–express lane system |
| Maryland | I-270 (northbound) | Montgomery County | Montrose Road – Montgomery Village Avenue | 8.3 miles (13.4 km) | signed local–express lane system |
| Maryland | I-270 (southbound) | Montgomery County | Montrose Road – I-370 | 5.6 miles (9.0 km) | signed local–express lane system |
| Michigan | I-96 | Detroit | Outer Drive – Davison Avenue | 5.8 miles (9.3 km) | signed local–express lane system |
| Mississippi | I-55 | Hernando | I-69 / I-269 | 1.08 miles (1.74 km) | |
| Nebraska | US 6 (West Dodge Road/West Dodge Expressway) | Omaha | 93rd Street – 120th Street | 1.5 miles (2.4 km) | Elevated West Dodge Freeway bypasses 114th and 120th Street intersections; West Dodge Road is technically a frontage road due to multiple at-grade intersections |
| New Jersey | I-78 | | I-95 / N.J. Turnpike – Route 24 | 10.2 miles (16.4 km) | signed local–express lane system |
| New Jersey | I-80 | | I-95 / G.S. Parkway – I-280 / I-287 | 6.2 miles (10.0 km) | signed local–express lane system |
| New Jersey | I-95 / N.J. Turnpike | Ridgefield Park | between Overpeck Creek and US 46 – George Washington Bridge. | 5.1 miles (8.2 km) | signed local–express lane system |
| New Jersey | I-287 | | I-78 – US 202 / US 206 | 3.0 miles (4.8 km) | |
| New Jersey | US 1/9 | | Route 81 – US 1/9 Truck | 5.9 miles (9.5 km) | signed local–express lane system |
| New Jersey | Route 3 | | N.J. Turnpike western spur – Route 495 | 1.2 miles (1.9 km) | |
| New Jersey | G.S. Parkway | Middlesex & Monmouth counties | Raritan tolls – Asbury Park tolls | 21.8 miles (35.1 km) | signed local–express lane system |
| New York | I-495 | Elmhurst | Exit 19 | 1.4 miles (2.3 km) | |
| New York | Cross County Parkway | Yonkers-Mount Vernon | Cross County Parkway (Exits 4S / 4N - Exit 8) | 2.10 miles (3.38 km) | signed local–express lane system |
| New York | Westchester Avenue | Harrison | I-287 (Exits 9S / 9N) | 2.8 miles (4.5 km) | |
| Ohio | I-270 | Columbus | SR 161 – McCutcheon Road (just north of I-670) | 3.3 miles (5.3 km) | |
| Ohio | I-271 | Greater Cleveland | I-480 (North Randall) – I-90 (Willoughby Hills) | 13.9 miles (22.4 km) | signed local–express lane system |
| Ohio | I-480 | Greater Cleveland | I-77 (Independence) – Transportation Boulevard / East 98th Street (Garfield Heights) | 0.8 miles (1.3 km) | signed local–express lane system |
| Pennsylvania | I-79 | Cranberry Township | PA 228 | 2 miles (3.2 km) | southbound only |
| Pennsylvania | US 1 (Roosevelt Boulevard) | Northeast Philadelphia | | 11.9 miles (19.2 km) | surface roadway with express and local lanes |
| Texas | I-10 (McDermott Freeway) | San Antonio | Exit 567 – Exit 570 | 2.0 miles (3.2 km) | |
| Texas | I-10 / I-35 (PanAm Expressway) | San Antonio | Exit 155A (Spur 536) –Exit 154A (Loop 353) | 0.7 miles (1.1 km) | |
| Texas | I-35 (PanAm Expressway) | San Antonio | Exit 156 (I-10) – Exit 158 (I-37) | 1.8 miles (2.9 km) | |
| Texas | I-635 (Express toll lanes) | northern Dallas | Exit 19 – Exit 27C (I-35E) | 9.9 miles (15.9 km) | |
| Utah | I-15 | Midvale | 9400 S – 7200 S | 3.2 miles (5.1 km) | northbound only |
| Utah | I-15 | Salt Lake City | 1300 S – 2700 S | 2.3 miles (3.7 km) | collector-distributor system |
| Virginia | VA-267 (Dulles Toll Road) | Washington metropolitan area | I-495 (Exit 18) - Washington Dulles International Airport | 14.0 miles (22.5 km) | |
| Washington D.C./Virginia/Maryland | I-495 (Capital Beltway) | Washington metropolitan area | Telegraph Road (Alexandria, Virginia) – MD 210 (Oxon Hill, Maryland) | 6.6 miles (10.6 km) | signed local–express lane system |
| Washington | I-5 | Seattle | Yesler Way – NE Northgate Way | 7.3 miles (11.7 km) | reversible express lanes |
| Washington | I-5 | Seattle | Holgate Street – 8th Avenue tunnel | 1.7 miles (2.7 km) | |
| Wisconsin | I-41 / I-94 | Milwaukee | College Avenue – I-41 / I-43 | 2.5 miles (4.0 km) | Local lanes provide access to Milwaukee Mitchell International Airport's Airport Spur and other local exits |

=== Other countries ===
| Country | Highway | City | Location | Length | Notes |
|---|---|---|---|---|---|
| Argentina | National Route 9 (North Access freeway) | Buenos Aires | Vicente López – San Isidro | | |
| Australia | Warringah Freeway | Sydney | Miller Street – Bradfield Highway | | |
| Australia | West Gate Freeway | Melbourne | Eastern section: (CityLink) – Burnley Tunnel/Domain Tunnel; Western section: Hyde Street/ Williamstown Road - Princes Freeway/ Western Ring Road | | |
| Australia | Tullamarine Freeway | Melbourne | Mickleham Road - Western Ring Road (southbound direction only); Calder Freeway - Bell Street | | |
| Australia | Metropolitan Ring Road | Melbourne | Hume Freeway - Edgars Road | 1 km (0.6 mi) | |
| Australia | Kwinana Freeway | Perth | State Route 14 (Beeliar Drive) – Berrigan Drive | 2.2 km (1.4 mi) | |
| Brazil | Rod. Pres Dutra RJ/BR-116 | Nova Iguaçu, Rio de Janeiro | Saída 178B - Km 165 | 13.0 km (8.1 mi) | |
| Brazil | Rod. Pres Dutra SP/BR-116 | São Paulo, Guarulhos | Km 231 - Saída 211 | 20.0 km (12.4 mi) | |
| Brazil | Rod. Pres Dutra SP/BR-116 | São José dos Campos | Km 151 - Km 147 (RJ); Km 153 - 148 (SP) | 3.5 km (2.2 mi) (RJ); 5.0 km (3.1 mi) (SP) | |
| Brazil | Avenida das Américas | Rio de Janeiro | | | |
| China | G2001 G3 G35 | Jinan | | 24.0 km (14.9 mi) | |
| Egypt | Suez Rd | El Shorouk, Cairo Governorate and Attaka, Suez Governorate | Shuhada Rd, El Shorouk to the entrance of the City of Attaka | 86 km (53 mi) | |
| England | A38 (Devon Expressway) | Plymouth | | | |
| England | M5 | Bristol | | | |
| England | M20 | Maidstone | | | |
| England | M55 | Preston, Lancashire | | | |
| England | M60 | Manchester | Sale – Carrington | 2.4 km (1.5 mi) | |
| France | A 6 | south of Paris | | | |
| France | A 9 | Montpellier | | 23.9 km (14.9 mi) | The local expressway is known as A709 |
| Hong Kong | Prince Edward Road West | Hong Kong | Lung Kong Road – Choi Hung Road | | elevated and lower roadway |
| Hong Kong | West Kowloon Highway / Lin Cheung Road | Hong Kong | | | |
| Hungary | M35 | Debrecen | | 4.5 km (2.8 mi) | |
| Indonesia | Airport Toll Road | Jakarta | Pluit – Penjaringan | | |
| Indonesia | Japek Toll Road / MBZ Elevated Toll Road | Bekasi & Karawang Regency | West Bekasi – East Telukjambe | | elevated and lower roadway |
| Malaysia | North–South Expressway Northern Route | Ipoh | Jelapang – Ipoh South | 7.31 km (4.54 mi) | Ipoh North–Ipoh South Local Express Lane |
| Mexico | Avenida Constitución / Morones Prieto | Monterrey | | | |
| Mexico | Via Rápida Poniente y Oriente | Tijuana | | | |
| Netherlands | A 2 / N 2 | | around Maastricht, Eindhoven, 's-Hertogenbosch, and Utrecht | | |
| Netherlands | A 4 | | around Leiden | | |
| Netherlands | A 4 | | The Hague and near Schiphol | | basketweave braid between two adjacent interchanges |
| Netherlands | A 12 | Utrecht | | | |
| Netherlands | A 15 | Rotterdam | | | |
| Netherlands | A 16 | Rotterdam | | | |
| Pakistan | Lahore Ring Road | Lahore | | 85.0 km (52.8 mi) | |
| Poland | S 2 | Warsaw | | 4.2 km (2.6 mi) | map |
| Russia | Leningradsky Avenue | Moscow | | | |
| Scotland | M8 | Glasgow | | | |
| Serbia | A1 | Novi Sad | Novi Sad North – Novi Sad South | 8.0 km (5.0 mi) | serves three interchanges in Novi Sad |
| Slovakia | D1 / Einsteinova | | Bratislava – Petržalka | | |
| South Africa | N1 | Cape Town | Koeberg Road – N7 | | outbound |
| Spain | AP-7 | near Barcelona | | | |
| Spain | M-30 | Madrid | | | |
| Taiwan | Nat 1 | Taipei | New Taipei City and Taipei | 32.9 km (20.4 mi) | Xizhi–Wugu Elevated Road |
| Taiwan | Nat 1 | Taipei | New Taipei City - Taoyuan | 71.0 km (44.1 mi) | Wugu–Yangmei Elevated Road |
| Turkey | D.100 | Gebze, Kocaeli | | | |
| Turkey | D.100 | Istanbul | Beylikdüzü – Cevizlibağ | 28.3 km (17.6 mi) | on the European side |
| Turkey | D.100 | Istanbul | Ünalan – Bostancı | 9.6 km (6.0 mi) | on the Asian side |
| Turkey | D.100 | Istanbul | Kartal – Pendik | 9.9 km (6.2 mi) | on the Asian side |
| Turkey | D.300 | İzmir | Halkapınar – Kemalpaşa | 9.1 km (5.7 mi) | |
| Turkey | D.300 | Malatya | through the city center | 11 km (6.8 mi) | |
| Turkey | Kennedy Avenue | Istanbul | Yenikapı – Bakırköy | 3.5 km (2.2 mi) | express lanes for the Eurasia Tunnel |
| Vietnam | Đại Lộ Thăng Long | Hanoi | Láng – Hoà Lạc | 29.3 km (18.2 mi) | |

== Gallery ==
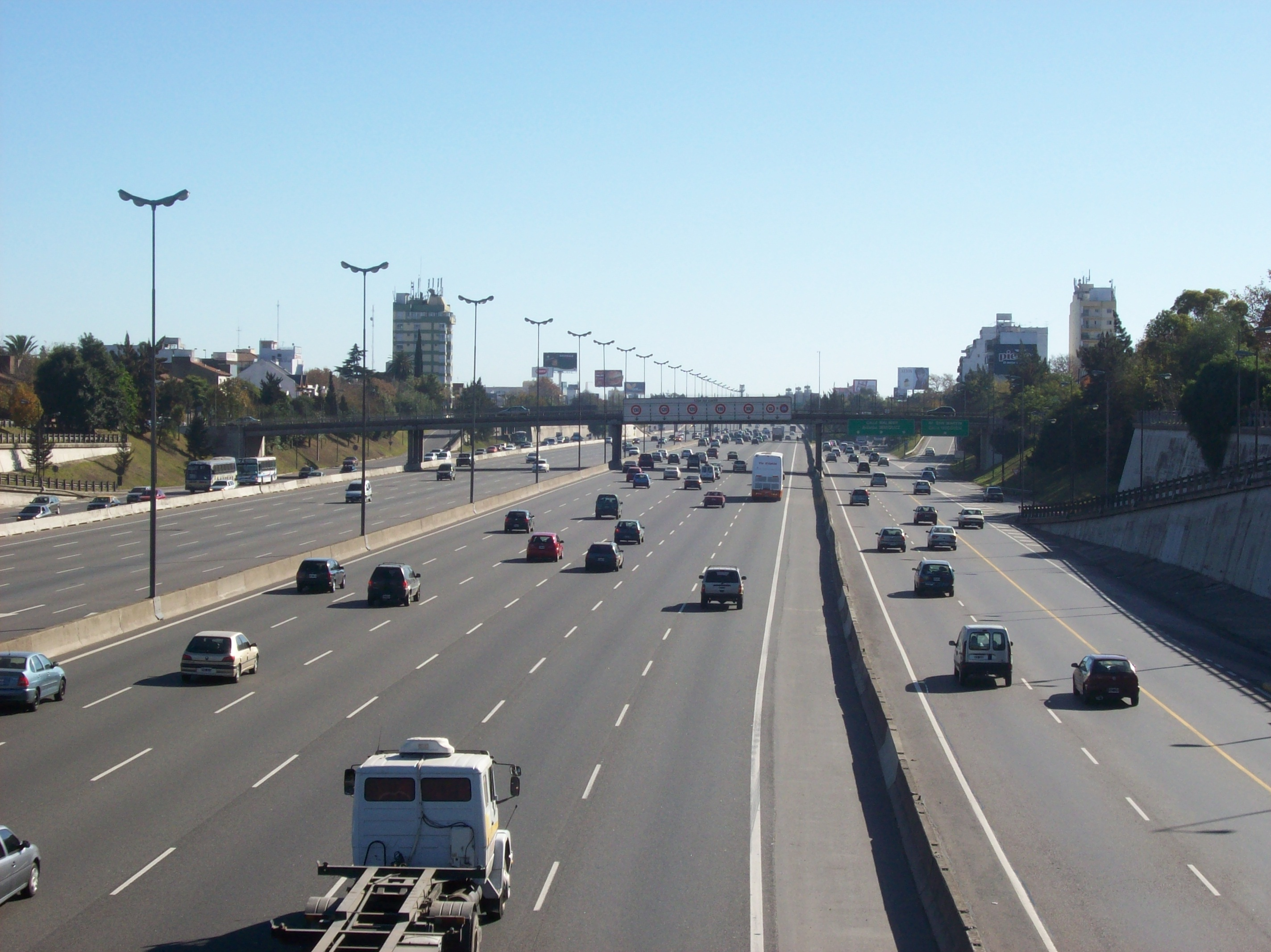
North Access freeway over National Route 9 (Argentina). The express lanes (left, all vehicles) and local lanes (right, cars and buses only) seen in the view towards the north.

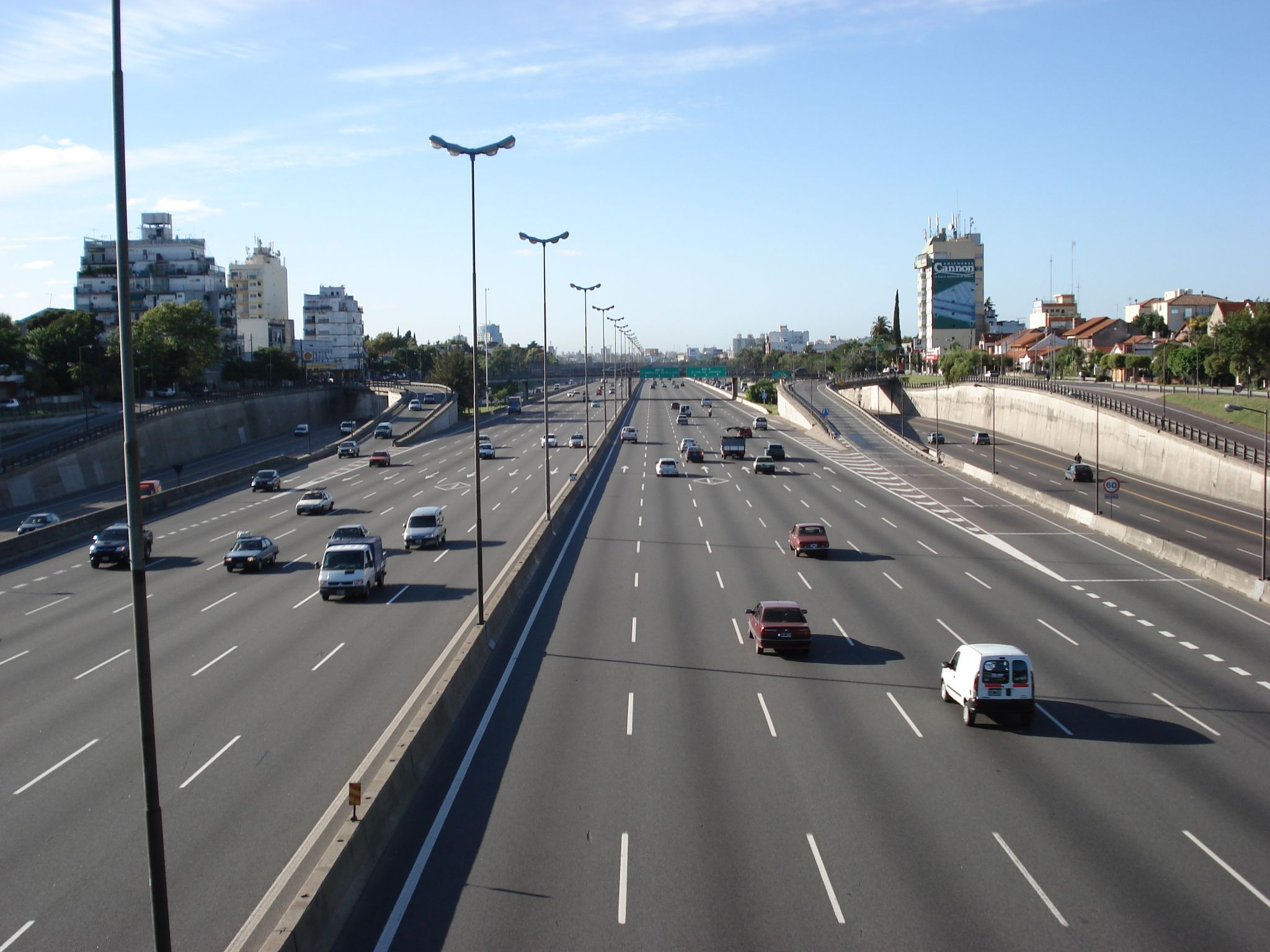
A view of North Access's Freeway at Buenos Aires, Argentina, from the bridge on Pres H.Yrigoyen Street at Florida, Buenos Aires, Argentina.

Local and express lanes can be connected using a basketweave interchange.

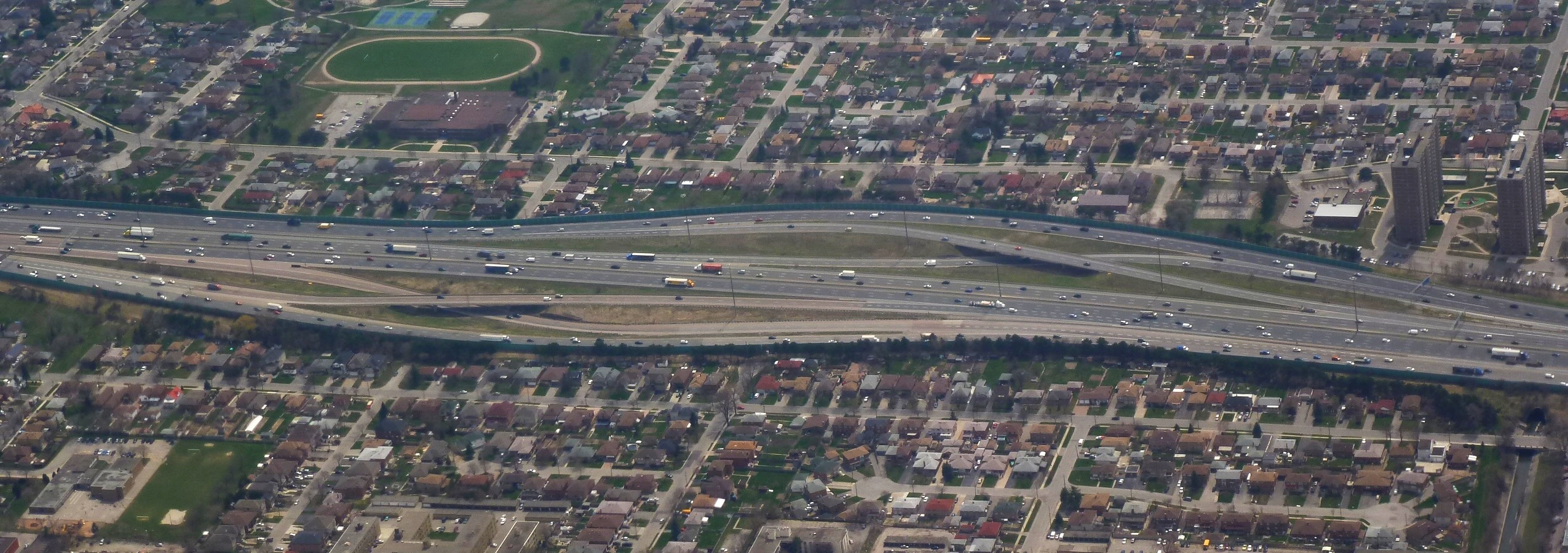
Basketweave on Highway 401 in Toronto

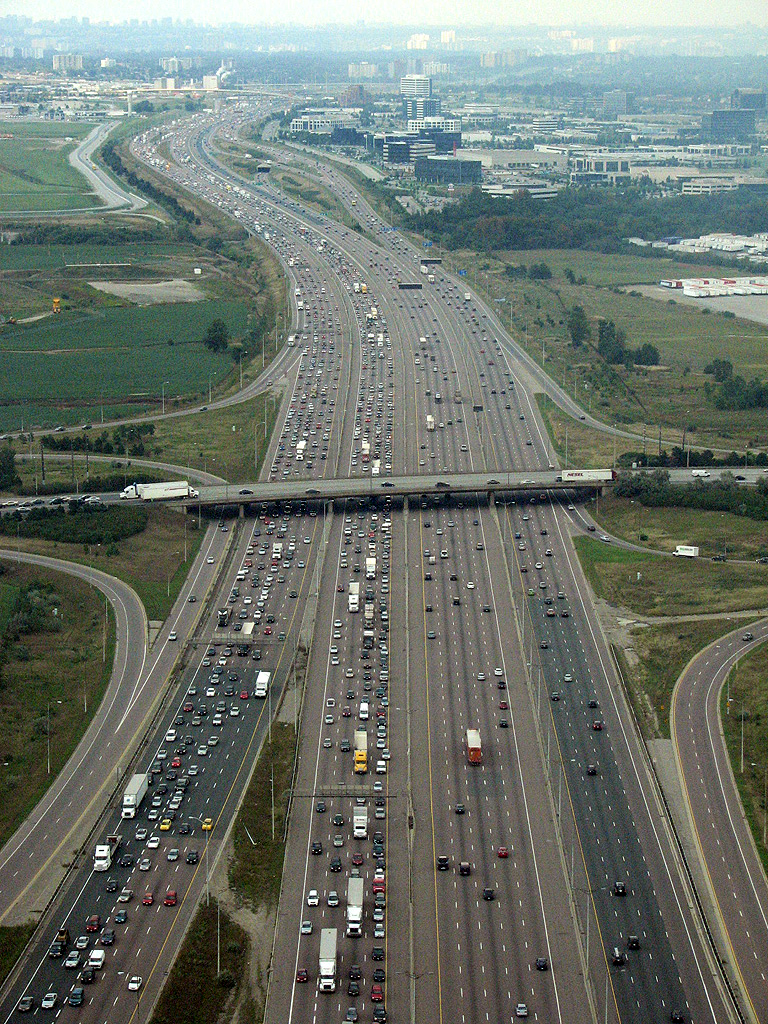
'The Transfer' on Highway 401 near Toronto Pearson Airport (top of image). 43.648373°N 79.637085°W

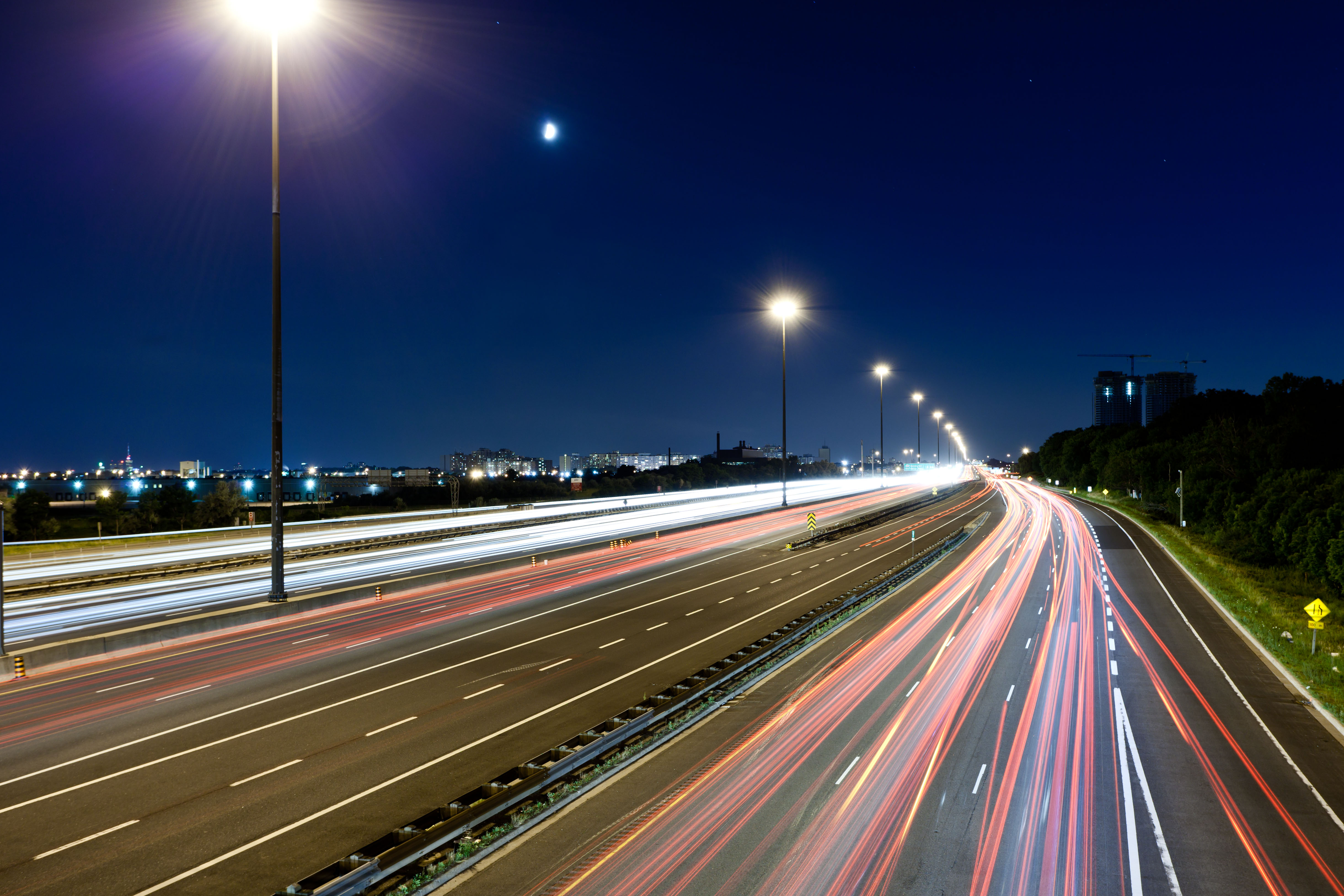
Express to collector transfer on Highway 401

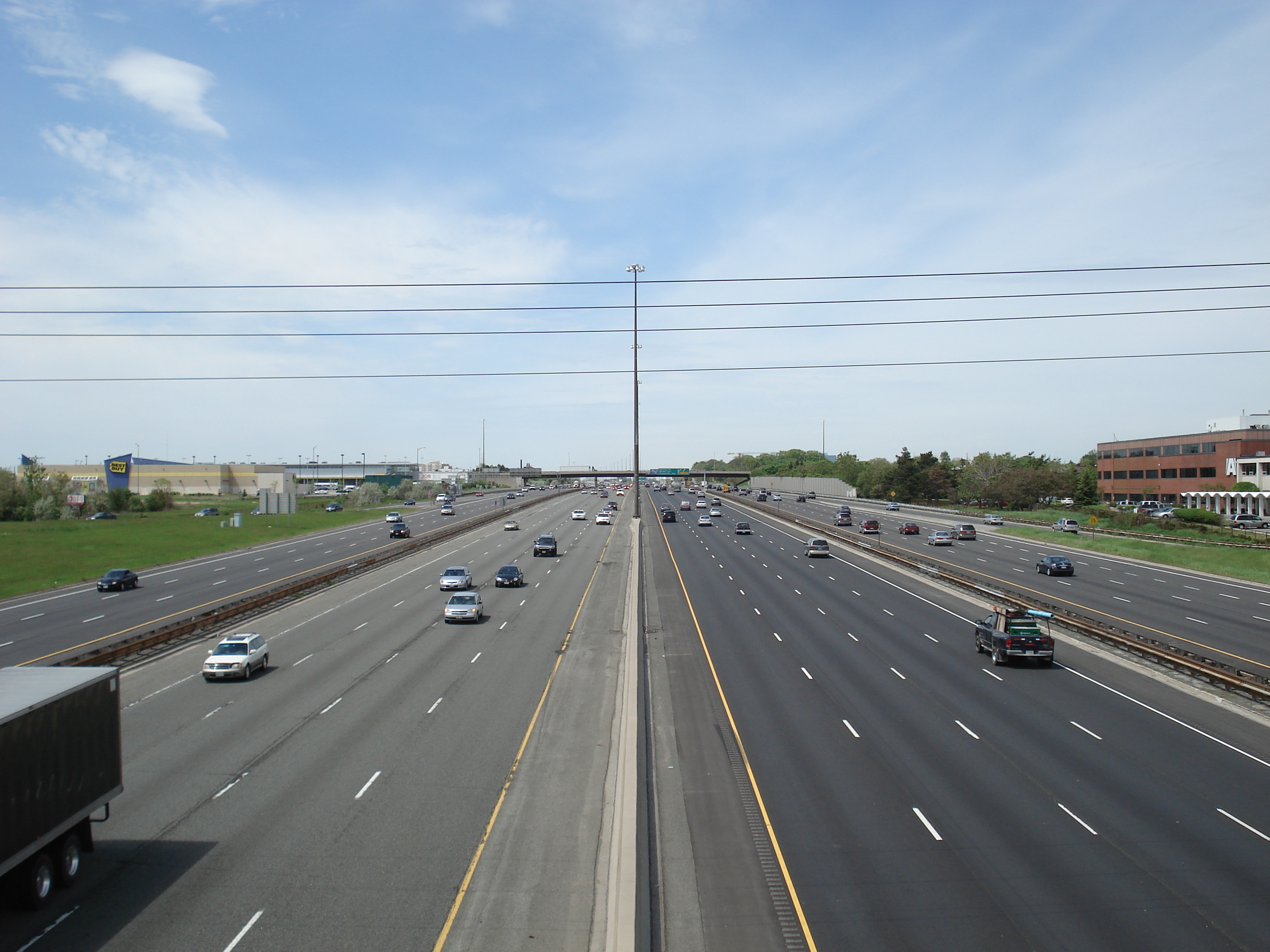
Collector–express roadway configuration on Highway 401

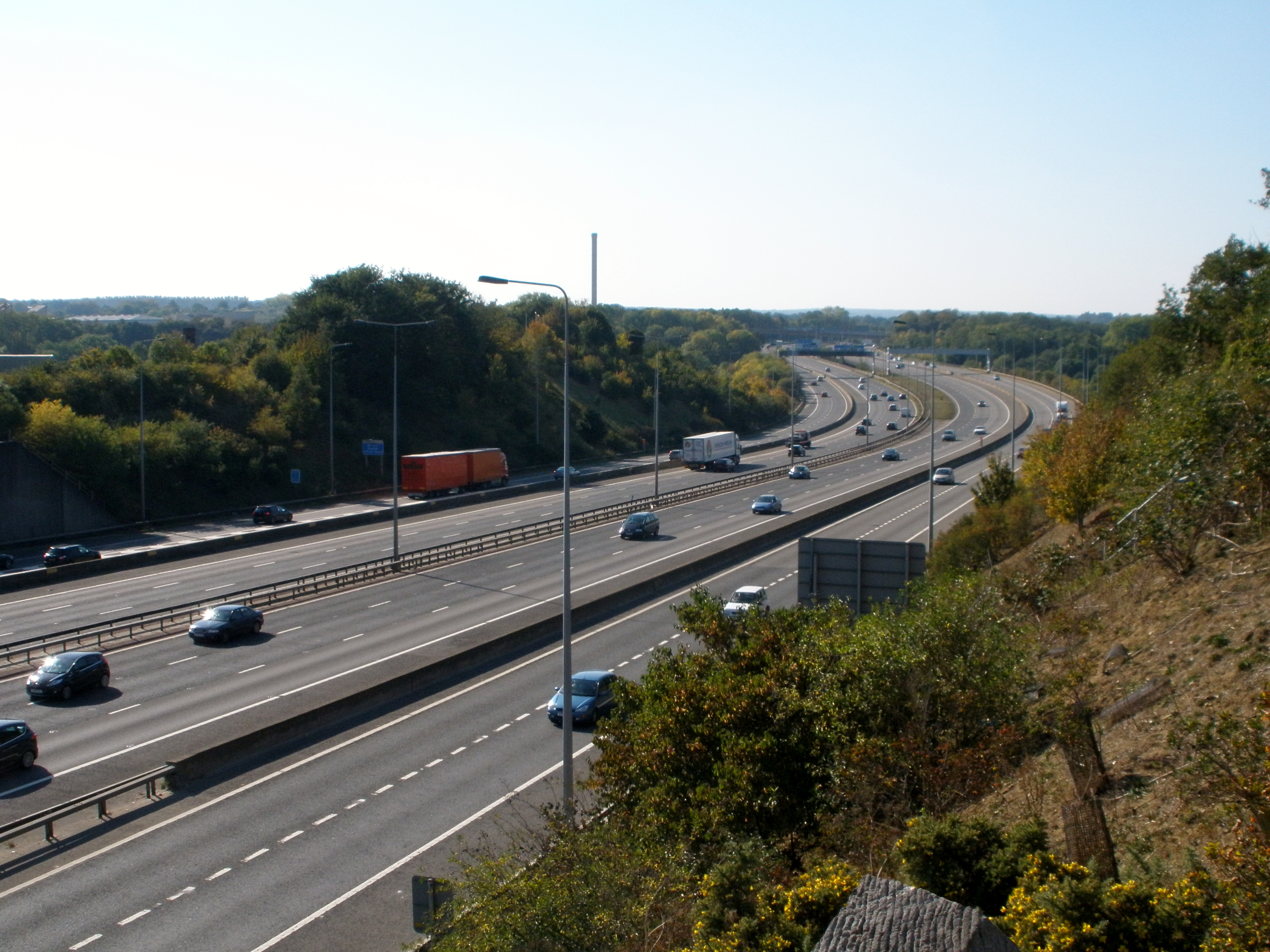
M20 motorway near Maidstone, England, showing separated local and express lanes

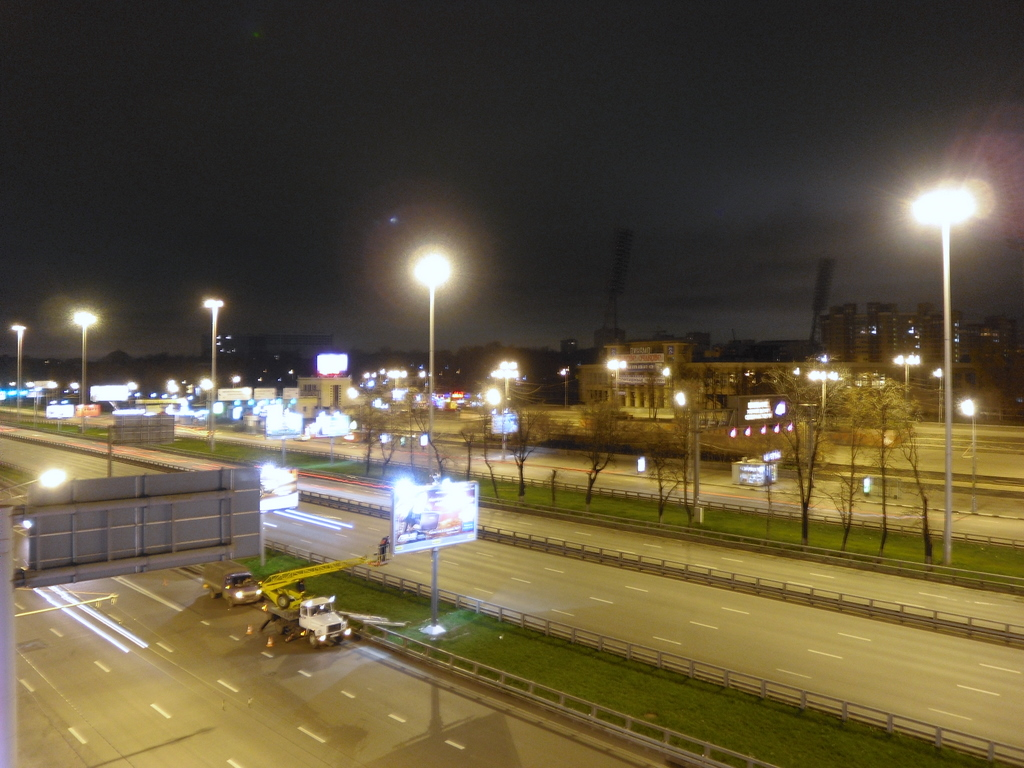
Express and local lanes of Leningradsky Prospekt in Moscow

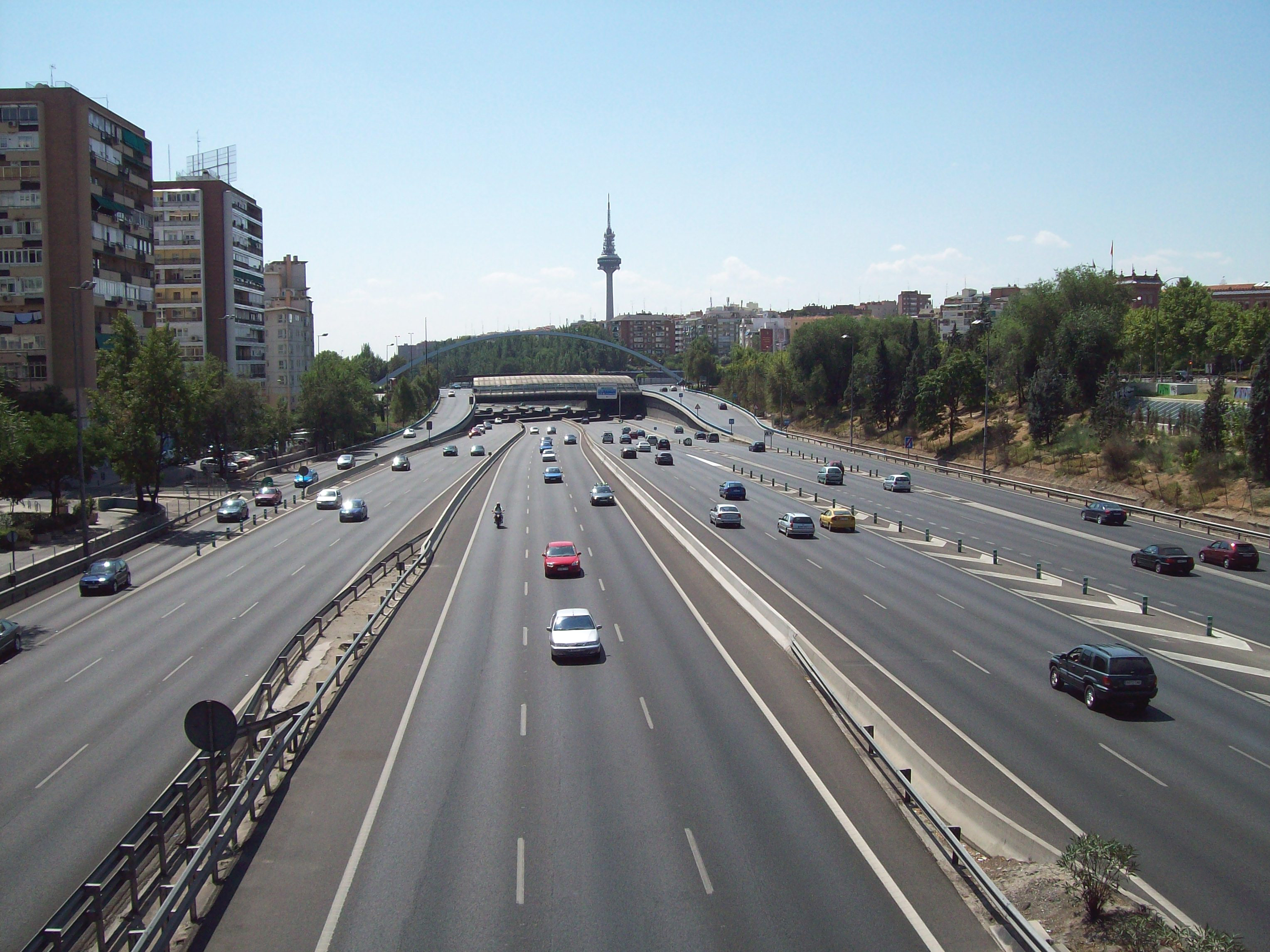
Express and local lanes, M-30 circular highway in Madrid, Spain, east section

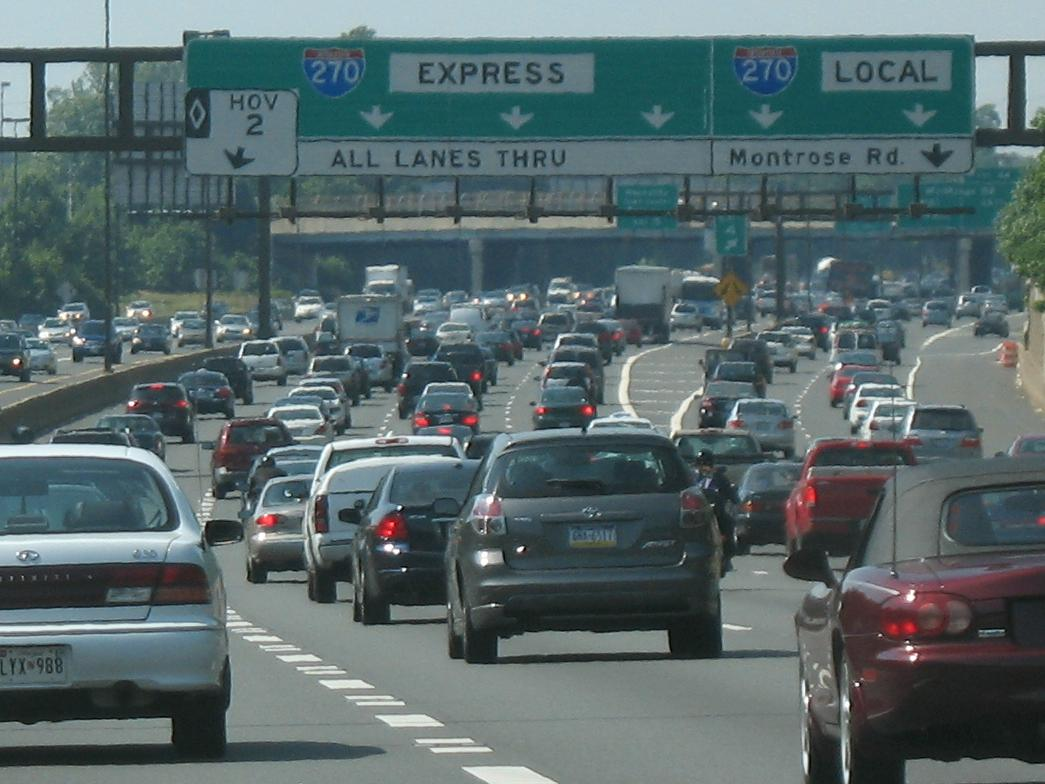
Local–express lanes on Interstate 270 in Montgomery County, Maryland

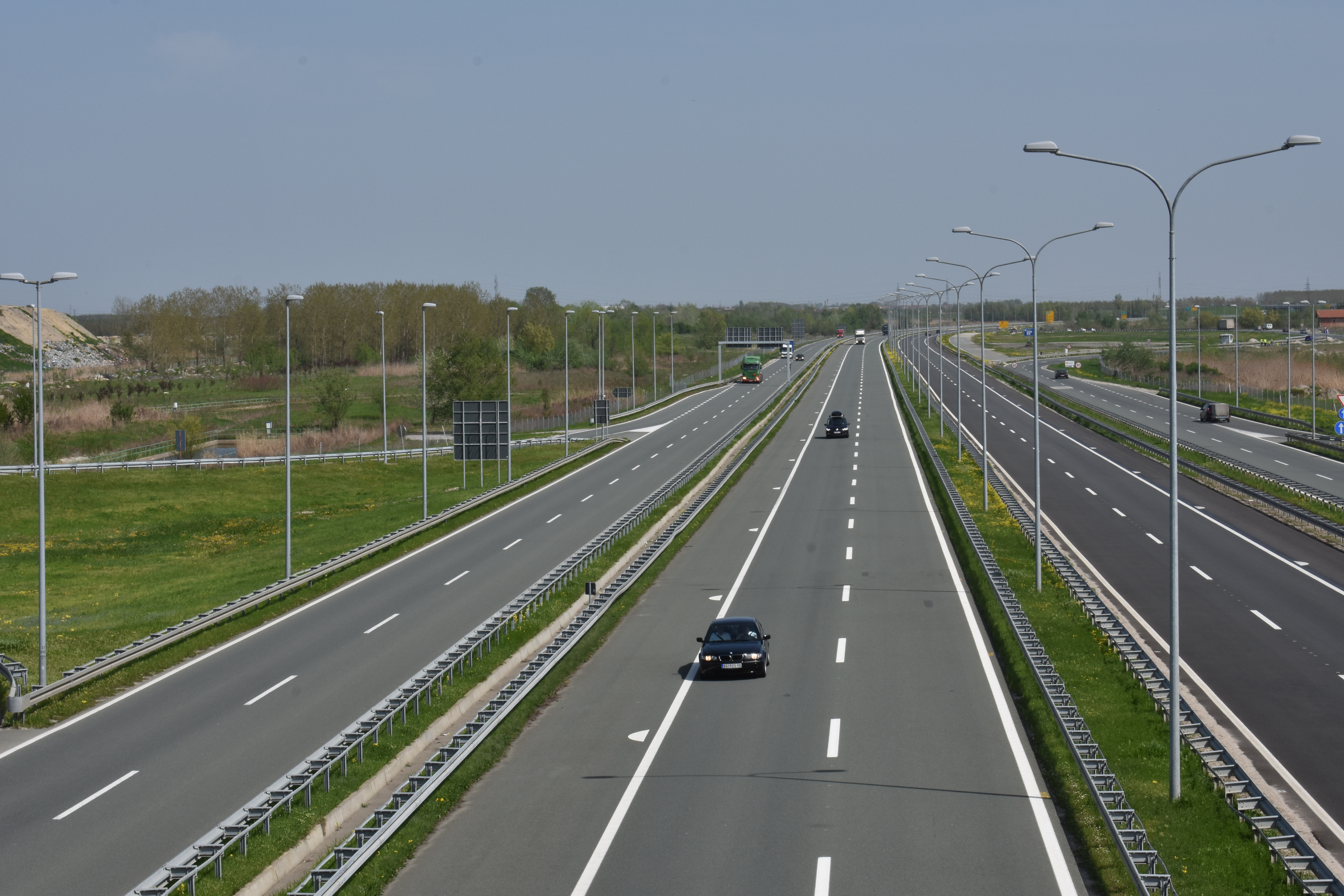
A1 motorway through Novi Sad, Serbia

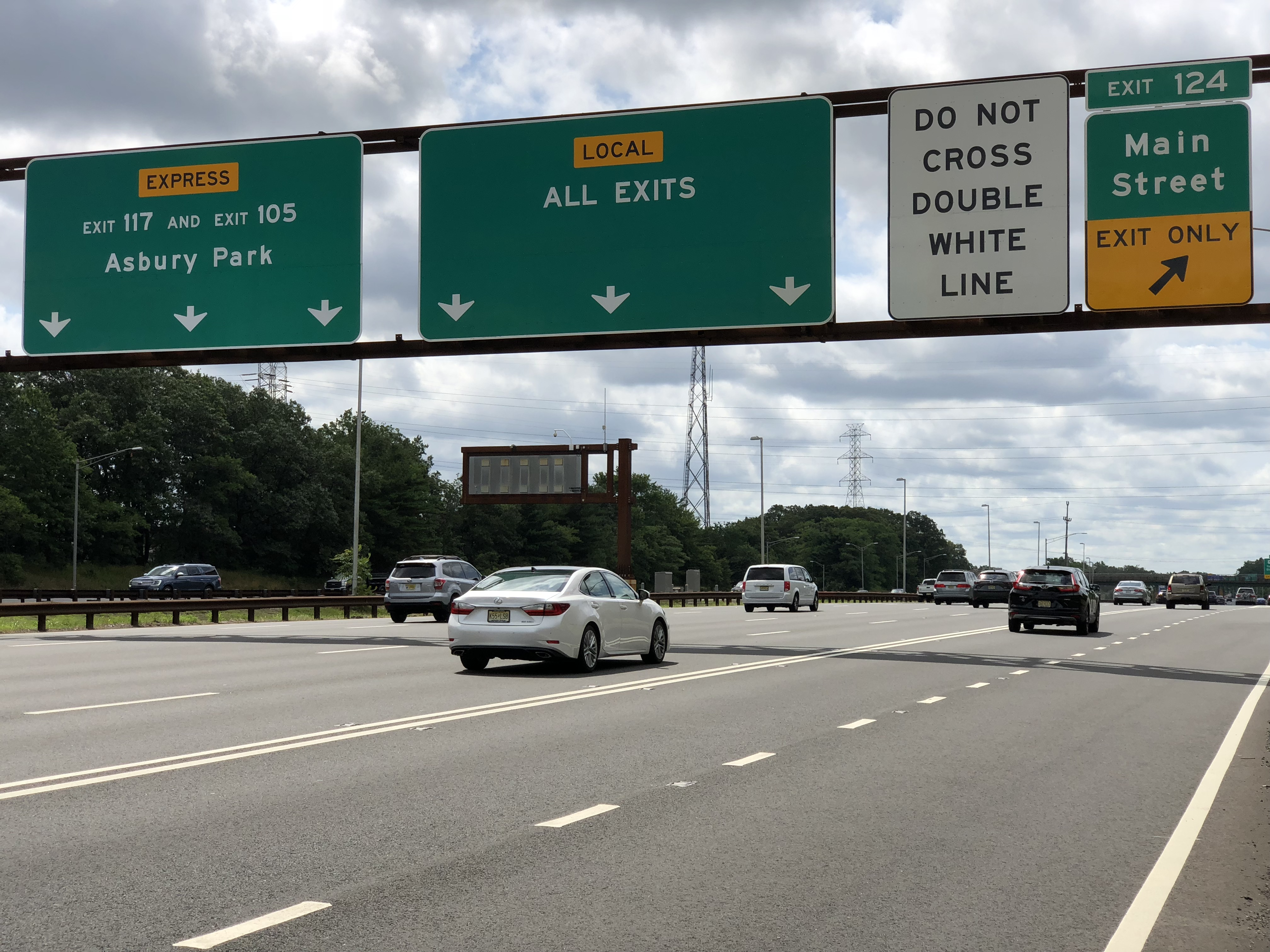
Garden State Parkway split into local and express lanes in Sayreville, New Jersey

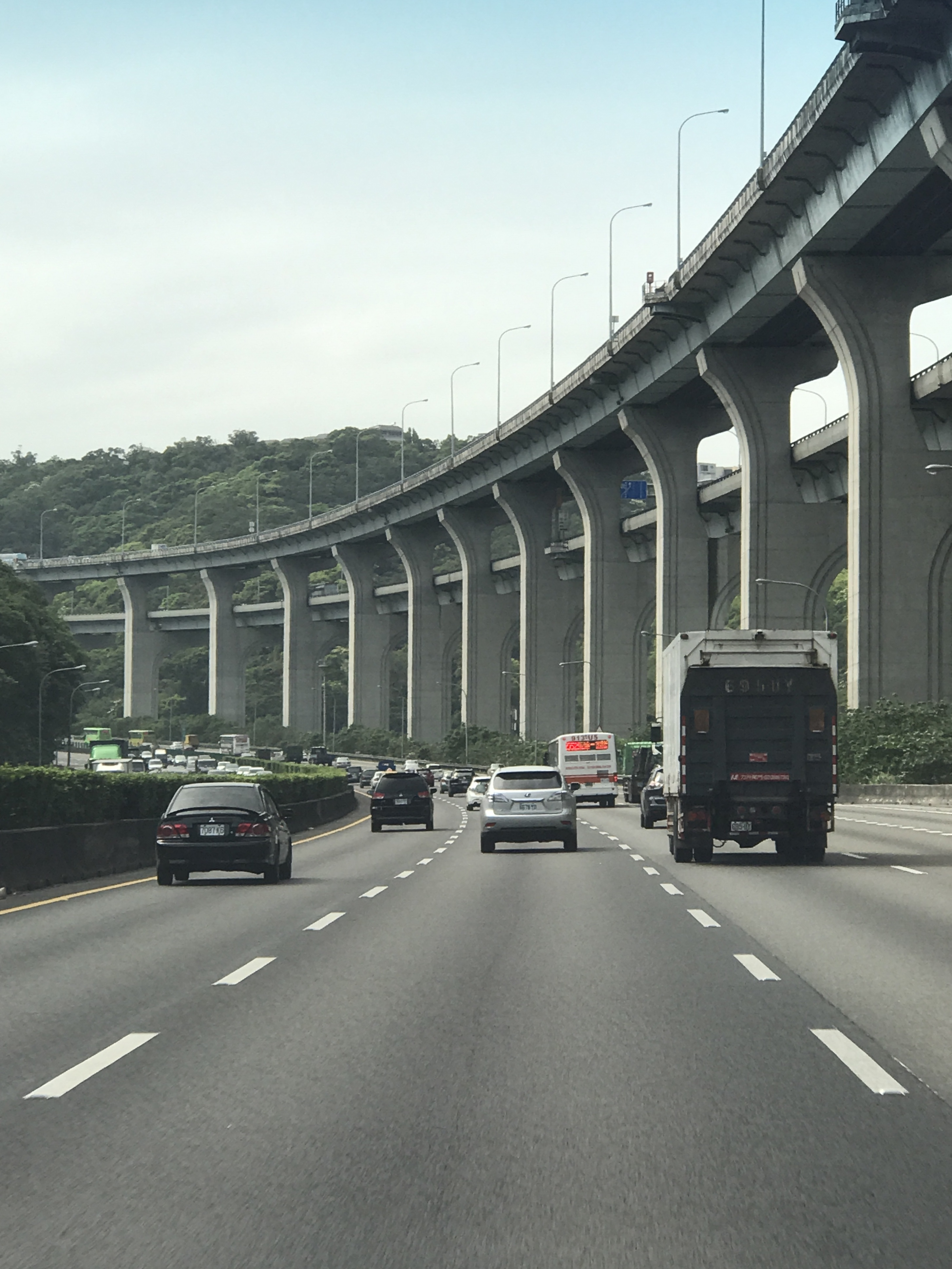
Freeway 1 in Taishan District, New Taipei showing the Ground Level and Elevated lanes

== Example of cloverleaf interchanges ==
A cloverleaf interchange may have collector/distributor lane system on a freeway or expressway to handle entering and exiting traffic. Usually, this lane will begin as an entrance-only ramp initially, but it will sometimes become a main lane or possibly an exit-only lane. The purpose of this lane is to facilitate traffic to the freeway exits and from the freeway entrances.

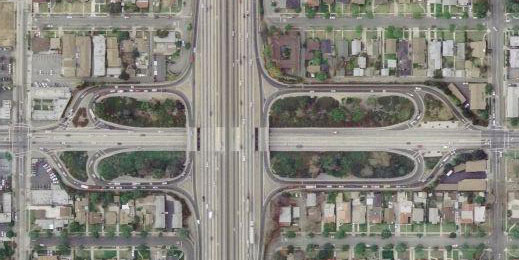

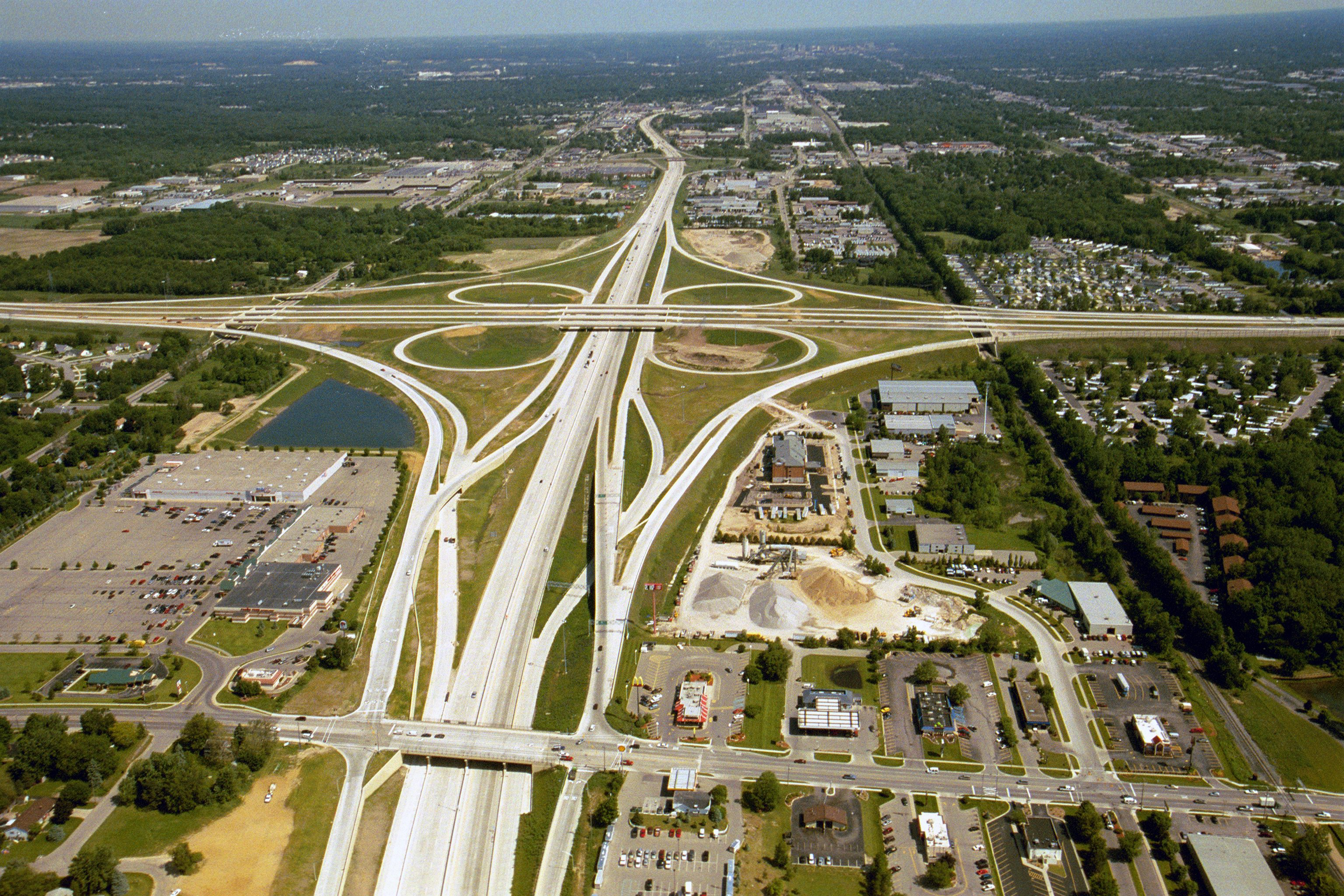

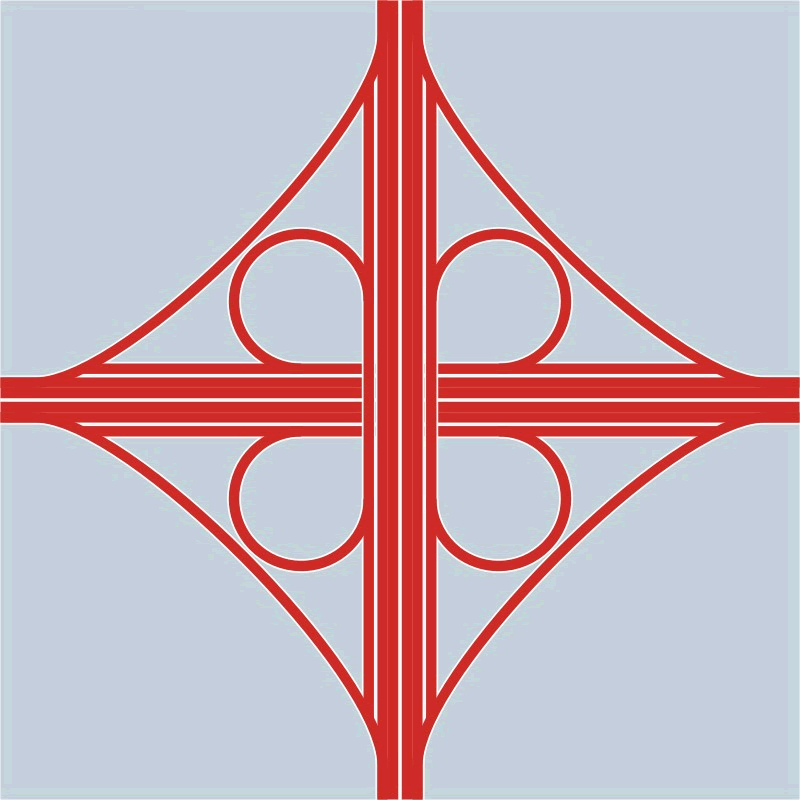

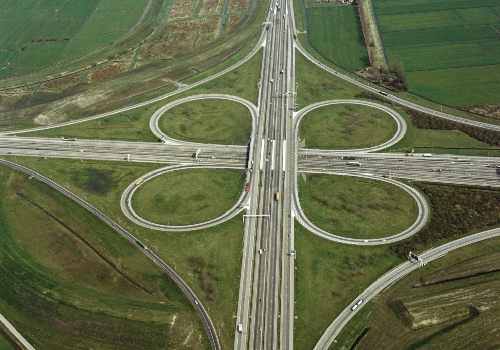

== See also ==
- Frontage road
- New York City Subway, known for extensive stretches of local and express tracks running together
