= MAPS Perak =

Theme park in Malaysia

Movie Animation Park Studios
- Location: Bandar Meru Raya, Ipoh, Perak, Malaysia
- Status: Defunct
- Opened: June 26, 2017
- Closed: January 28, 2020 (permanently)
- Theme: Show business (mostly animation)

MAPS Perak (Movie Animation Park Studio of Perak) was a theme park in Ipoh, Perak, Malaysia which was created from a joint venture between Perak Corporation Berhad and the Sanderson Group. It was originally planned to open in 2015, but the opening date was delayed to 26 June 2017. The theme park is the first fully animation-based theme park in Asia which contains attractions based on characters from studios such as DreamWorks Animation, The Smurfs, and BoBoiBoy. It was built at the cost of RM520 million. It houses both international and Malaysian intellectual properties including The Smurfs and BoBoiBoy, and has more than 40 attractions in six themed zones.

On January 28, 2020, the theme park was closed as the result of financial struggles and overdue electricity bills, but the park never reopened, and as of 2026, it has been confirmed to be ongoing demolition, contradicting previous claims that the closure was temporary.

== Timeline ==
MAPS Perak was announced in early 2014 and was planned to open in 2015, but the opening was moved. In April 2017, the theme park was said to have 96% of its construction completed, and was opened on 26 June 2017 soon after its completion.

== Location ==
MAPS Perak is located at Persiaran Meru Raya 3, Bandar Meru Raya, 30020 Ipoh, Perak, Malaysia.

== Characters ==
- BoBoiBoy
- Casper the Friendly Ghost
- Megamind
- Mr. Peabody & Sherman
- The Croods
- The Smurfs

== Attendance and operations ==
MAPS Perak management claims that the park had as much as 50,000 visitors, however this was only noted in its first month of operation in 2017. State Assemblyman for the Canning Wong Kah Koh was reported to have said daily attendance to MAPS only numbered up to 200 people. The operations of the park are further hampered with the delays of DreamZone, which eventually resulted with DreamWorks Animation terminating the licensing agreement with the park.
