= Tambun rock art =

Neolithic rock art in Perak, Malaysia

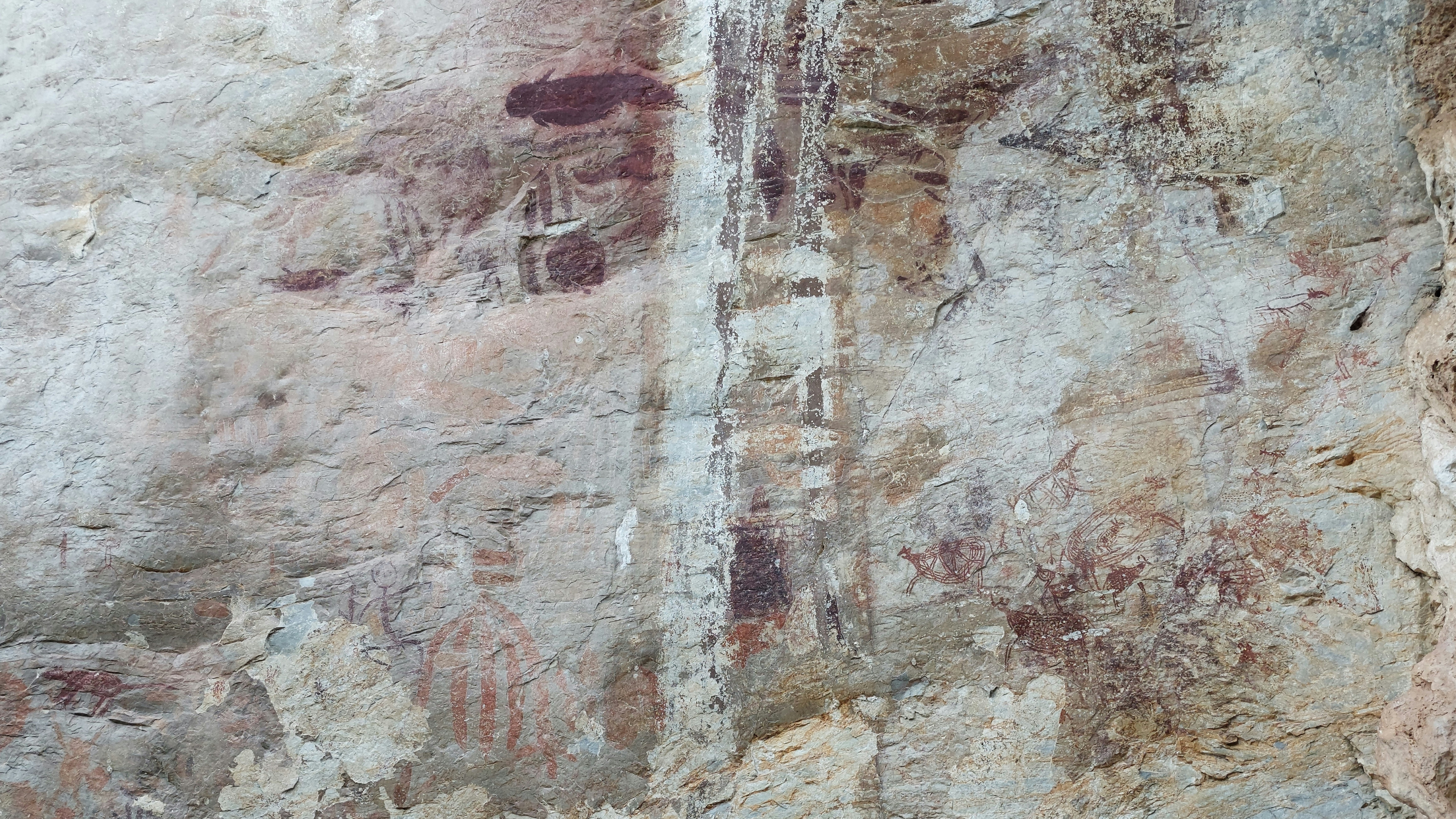
- Series of cave paintings at Gua Panjang
- Interactive map of Tambun rock art
- Location: Tambun, Ipoh, Perak, Malaysia
- Coordinates: 4.602°N 101.1305°E
- Discovery: 1959
- Geology: Limestone

Tambun rock art, is a series of Neolithic-era cave paintings at the Gunung Panjang limestone hill in Tambun, on the outskirts of Ipoh, Perak, Malaysia. The paintings were discovered on a rocky overhang in 1959 by 2/Lt R. L. Rawlings of the 2nd Battalion, 6th Queen Elizabeth's Own Gurkha Rifles. Popularly known as the "Tambun Cave Paintings" (Lukisan Gua Tambun in Malay), the paintings could have been made by the ancestors of the Orang Asli and had spiritual importance. This site should not be confused with Gunung Tambun, another limestone hill that is found several kilometres to the north of Gunung Panjang.

== Description ==
The Tambun rock art is on a prominent rockface on the west face of Gunung Panjang, a large karstic hill, nearly 2 kilometres long, overlooking Ipoh and the Kinta valley. The hill comprises light grey marble belonging to the Devonian limestone of the Kinta Valley. The Tambun rock art site is the largest display of neolithic paintings in Asia. They are estimated to be between 2,000 and 12,000 years old. The paintings were probably made using haematite. At the time of the discovery, the wide shelf at the base of the rock face was littered deep with empty, conical snail shells, all with their tips knocked off. The site is not easily accessible to tourists as the path is overgrown and muddy and there is a steep flight of steps up to the site.

== Gallery ==
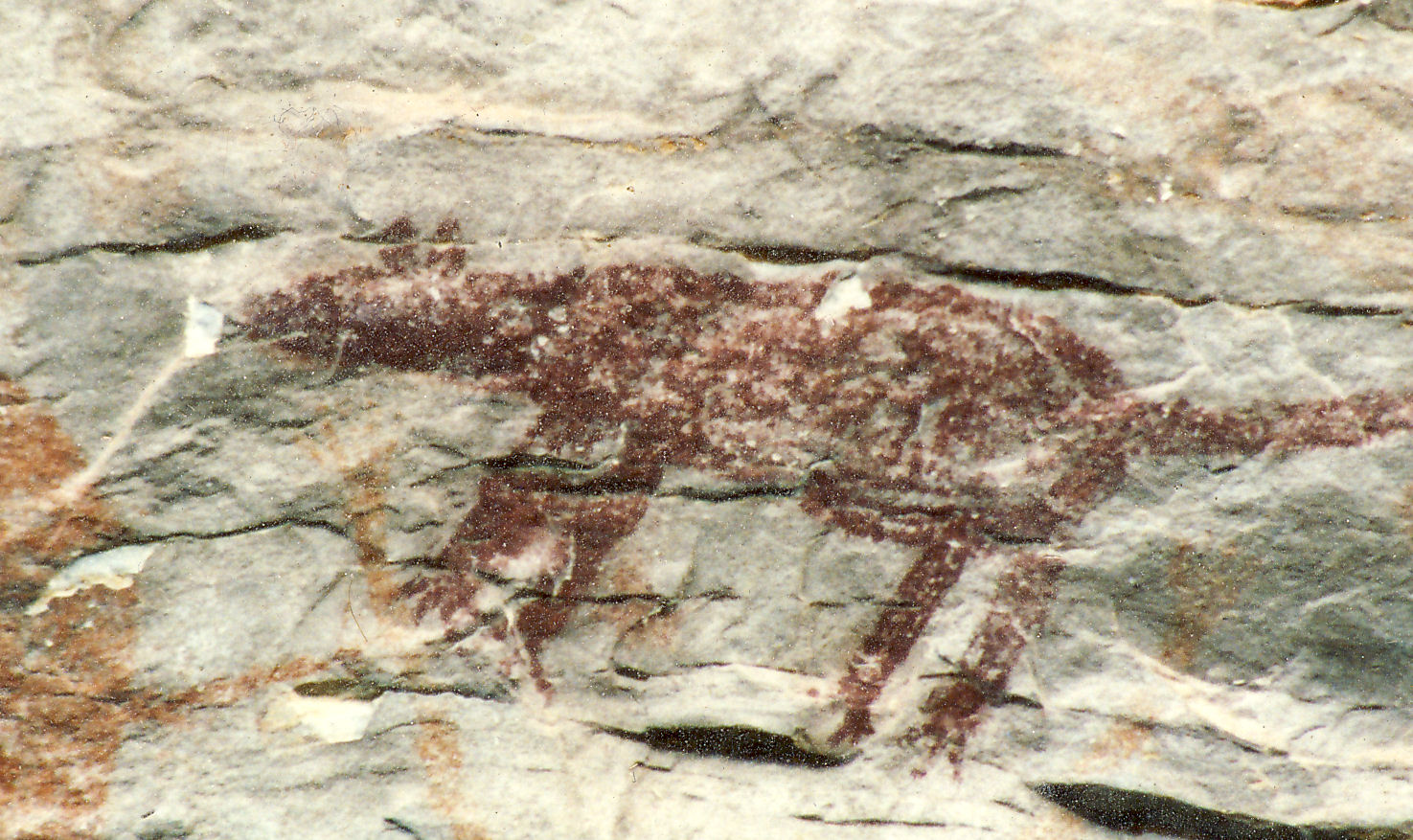
Canine figure

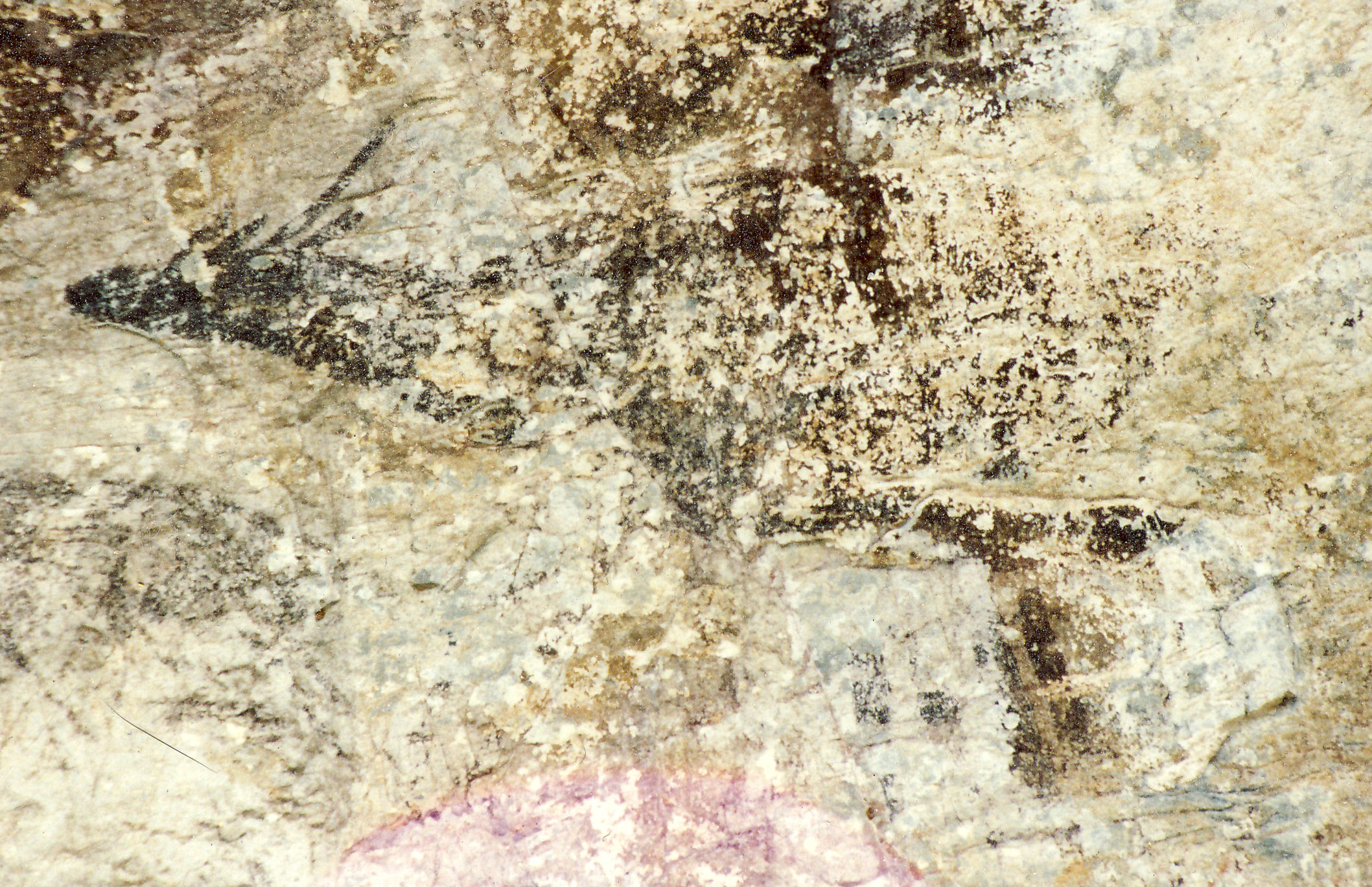
Deer figure

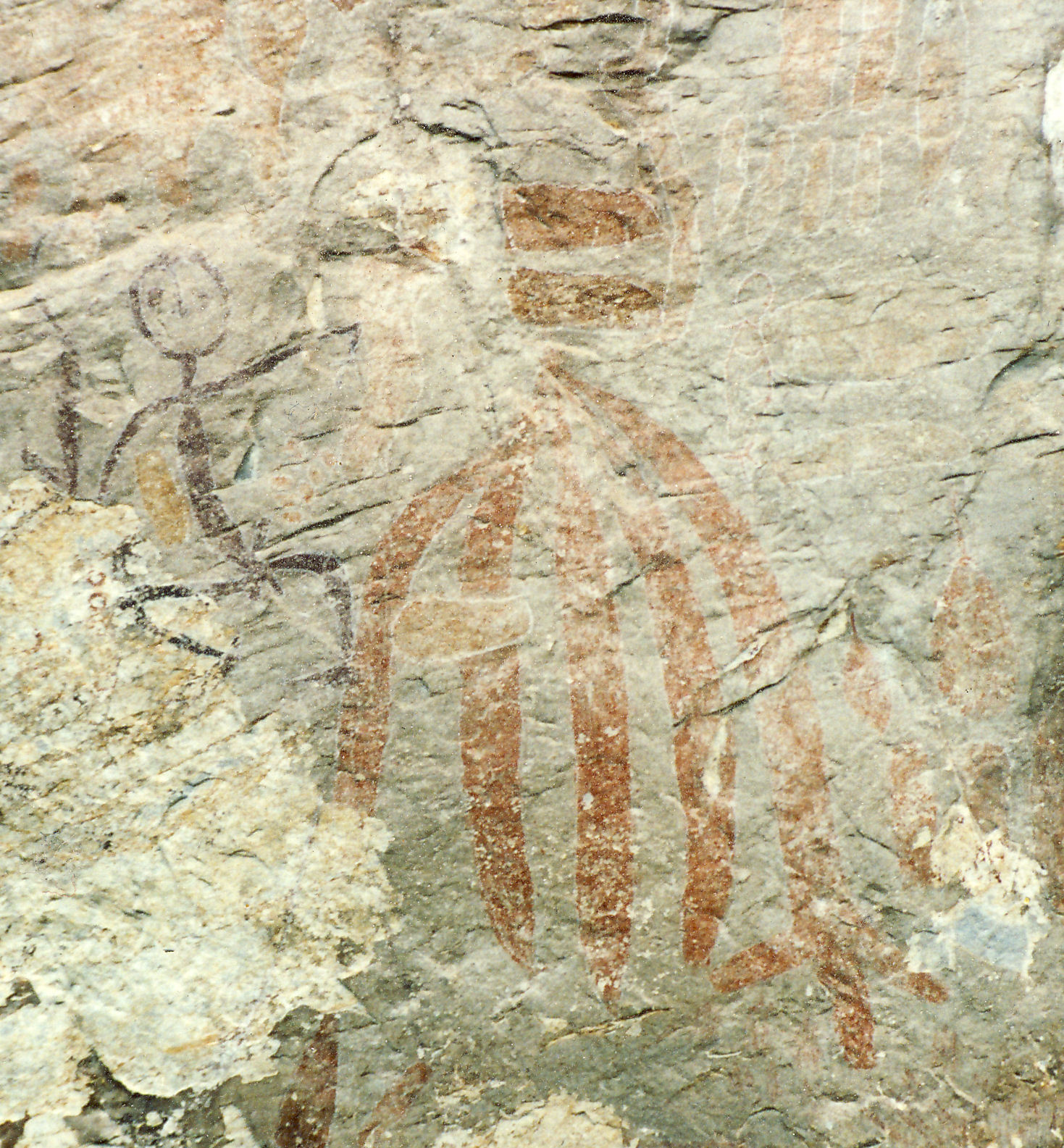
Human figure

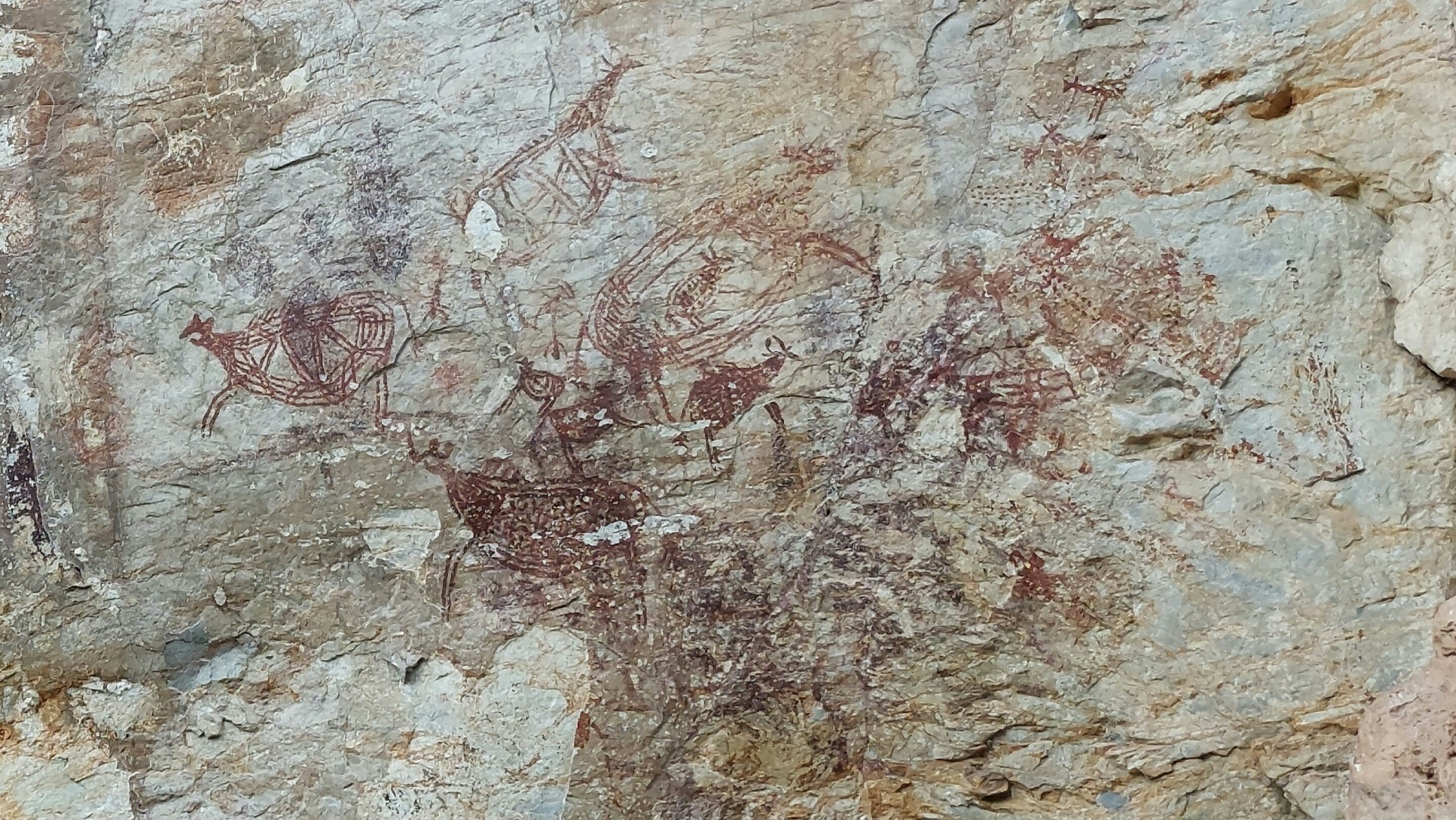
Herd of animals

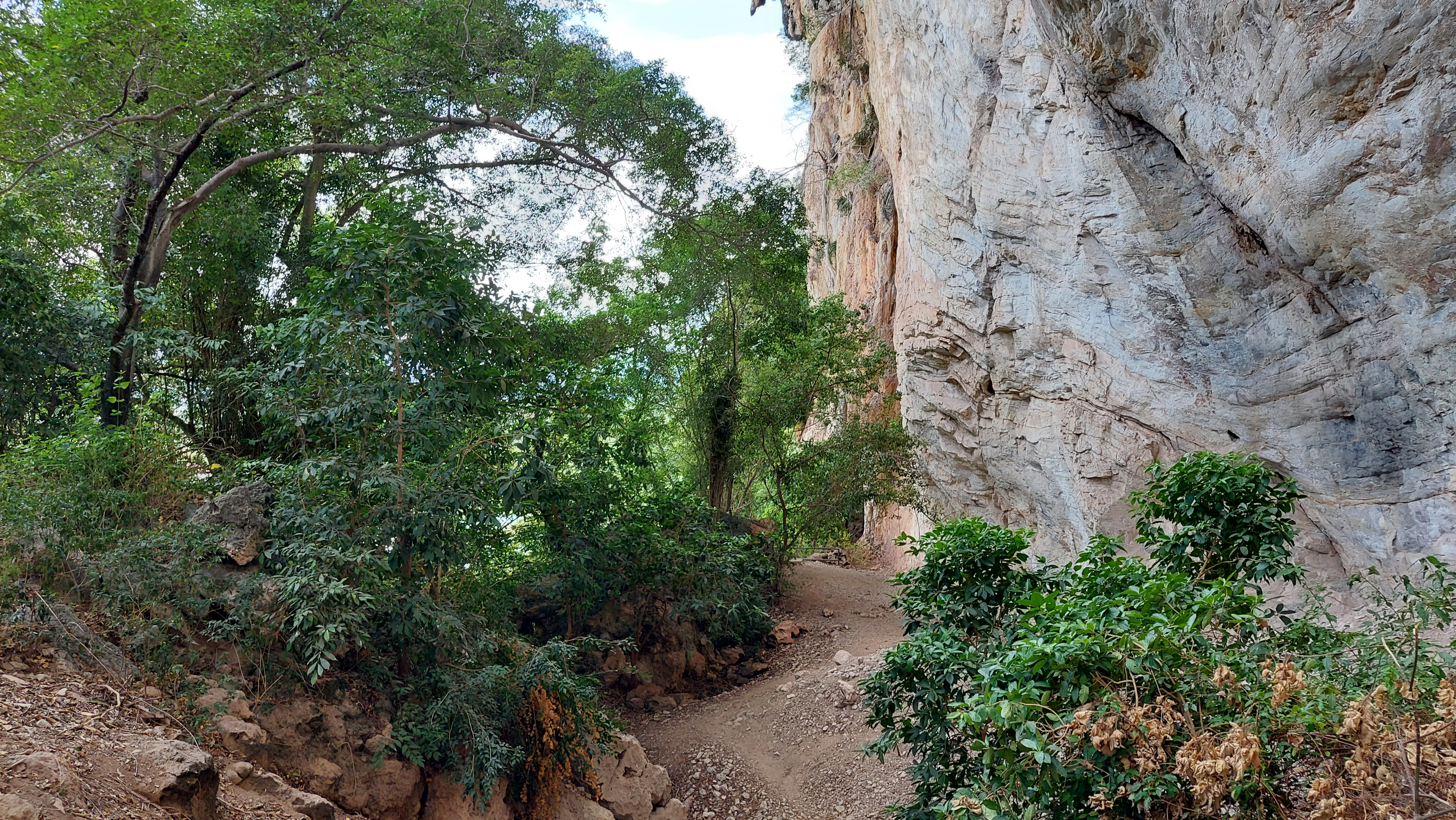
Path below the paintings

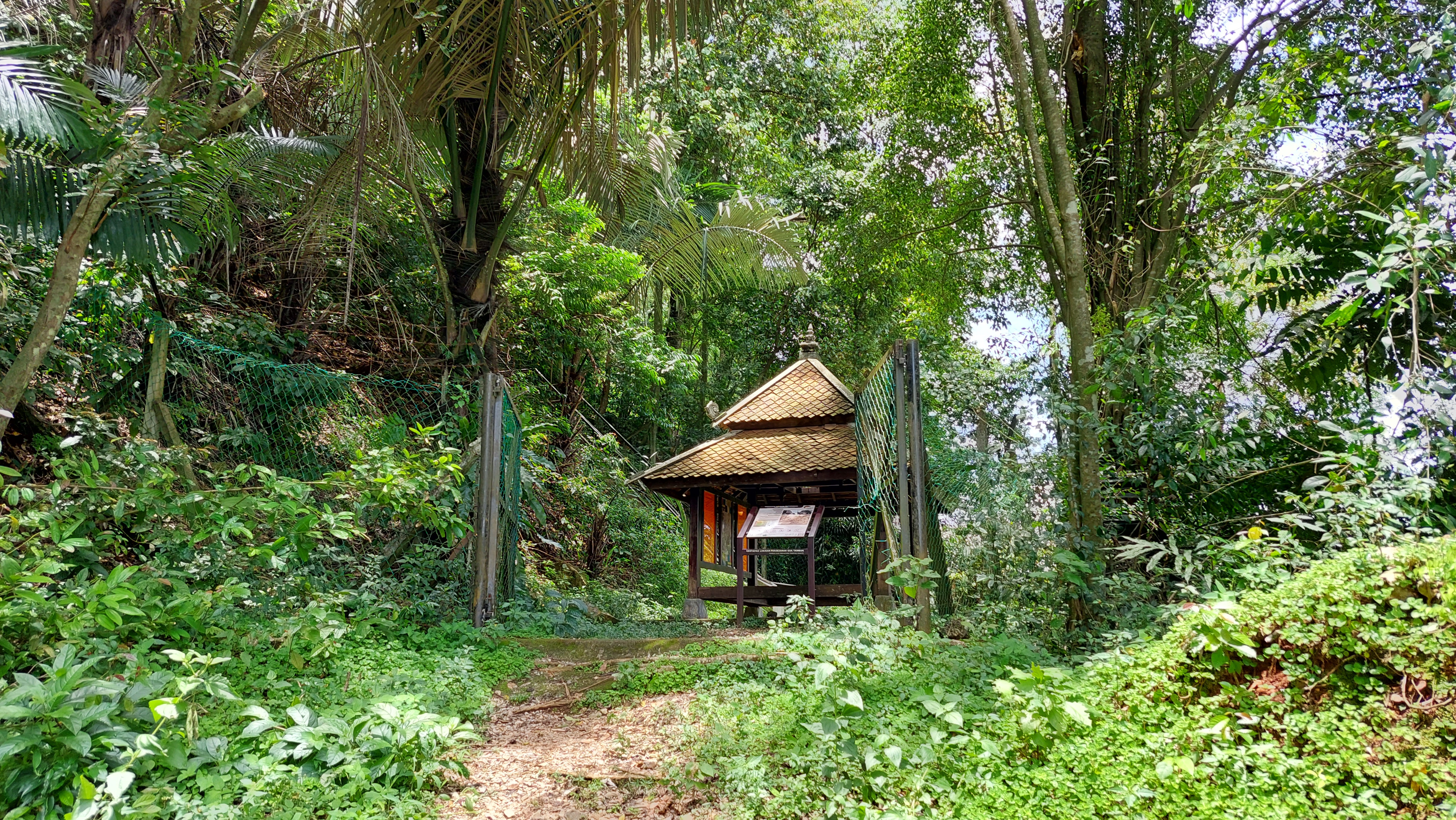
Entrance leading to the site
