= Klebang, Perak =

Klebang قليبڠ (Jawi), 佳邦 (Chinese)
- Interactive map of Klebang
- Coordinates: 4.6851754°N 101.1117829°E

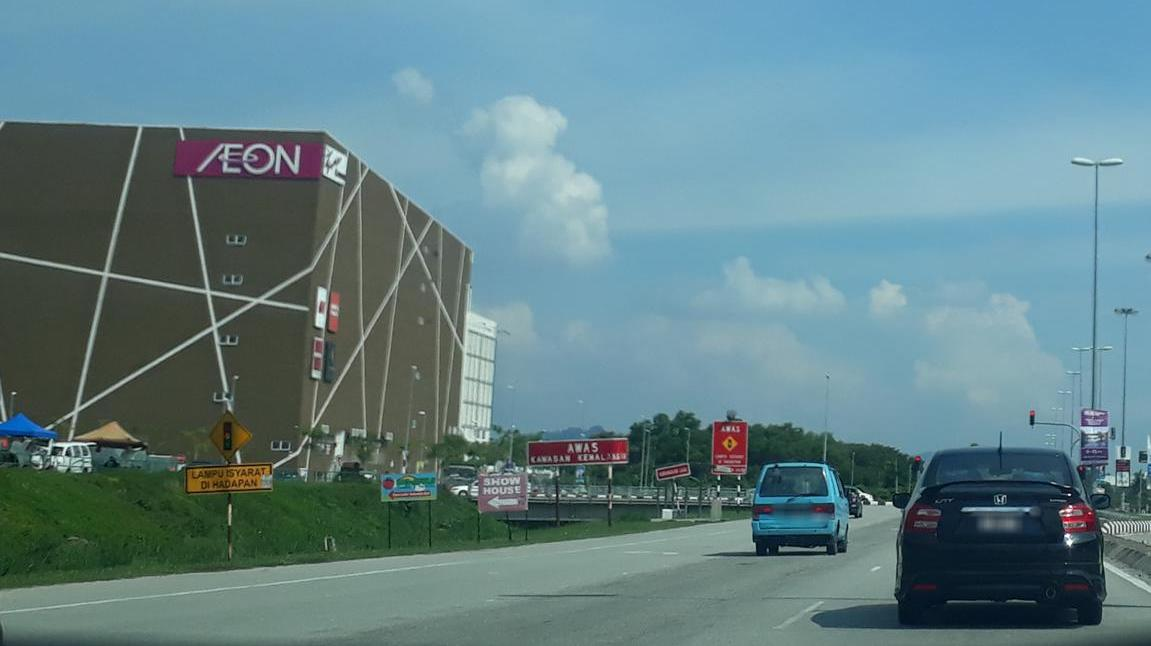
AEON Klebang

Klebang (Jawi: قليبڠ; Chinese: 佳邦) is a suburb of Ipoh, Perak, Malaysia. The suburb is connected to Bandar Meru Raya through a road opened in August 2023.
