= Bandar Meru Raya =

Coordinates: 4°40′15.2″N 101°04′29.08″E

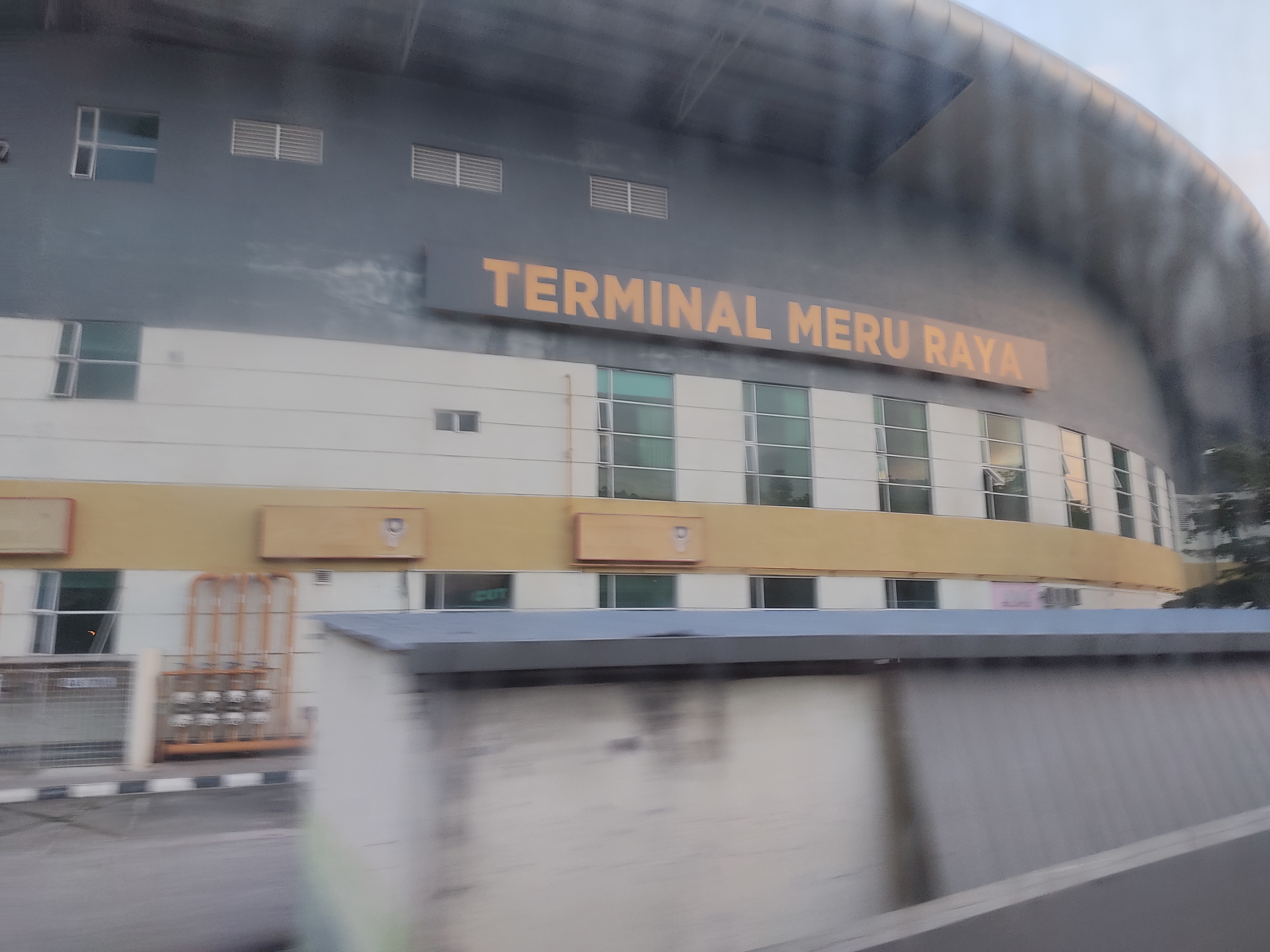
Terminal Meru Raya

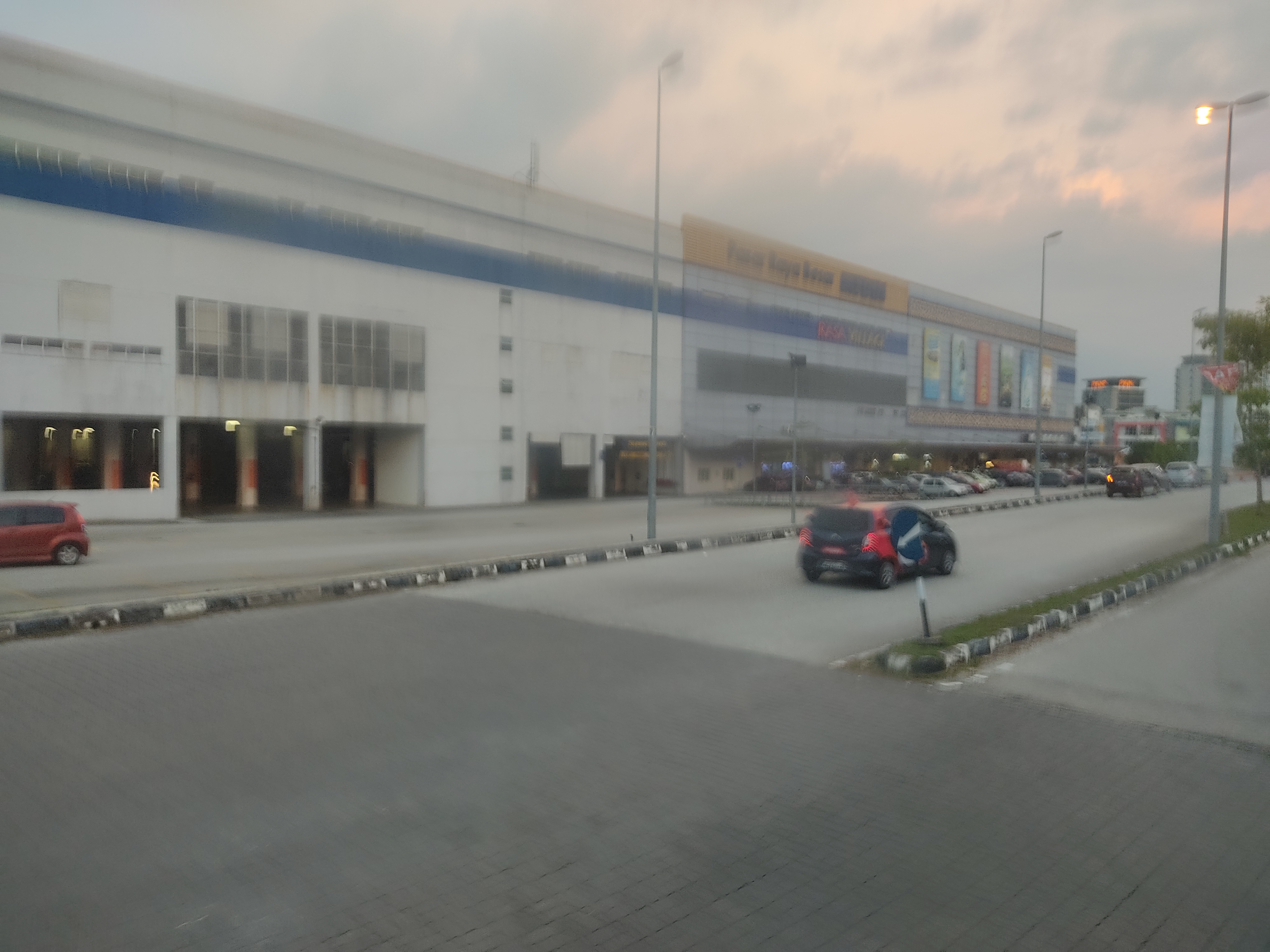
Mydin Meru Raya

Bandar Meru Raya (Jawi: بندر مرو راي) is a new township in Ipoh, Perak, Malaysia. It is located between Jelapang and Chemor.

The township includes various new shops, a shopping mall (Mydin Meru Raya branch), a bus and taxi terminal, and the Tenby International School. Located across the North-South Highway from Jelapang, Meru Raya is set to also house over 10 government buildings, including those for the Ministry of Home Affairs, Perak Foundation, Forestry Department, National Audit Department, Malaysia Anti-Corruption Agency, Ministry of Home Affairs and the National Archives of Malaysia.

The township also houses three replicas of traditional Perak Malay houses, Rumah Kutai, built on land owned by PCB Development, a subsidiary of Perak Corporation Berhad, in turn owned by the Perak State Development Corporation. One of the replicas was used as the Labu Sayong Signature@Meru restaurant; however after the closure of the restaurant, the house replicas became abandoned.

The longest bazaar in Perak, Bazar Ramadan BSAS, held during the Islamic month of Ramadan, is located at Bulatan Sultan Azlan Shah.

A road linking Meru Raya to Klebang, costing RM 7.2 million, opened in August 2023.
