= Lost World of Tambun =

Theme park in Kinta, Perak, Malaysia

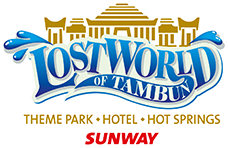

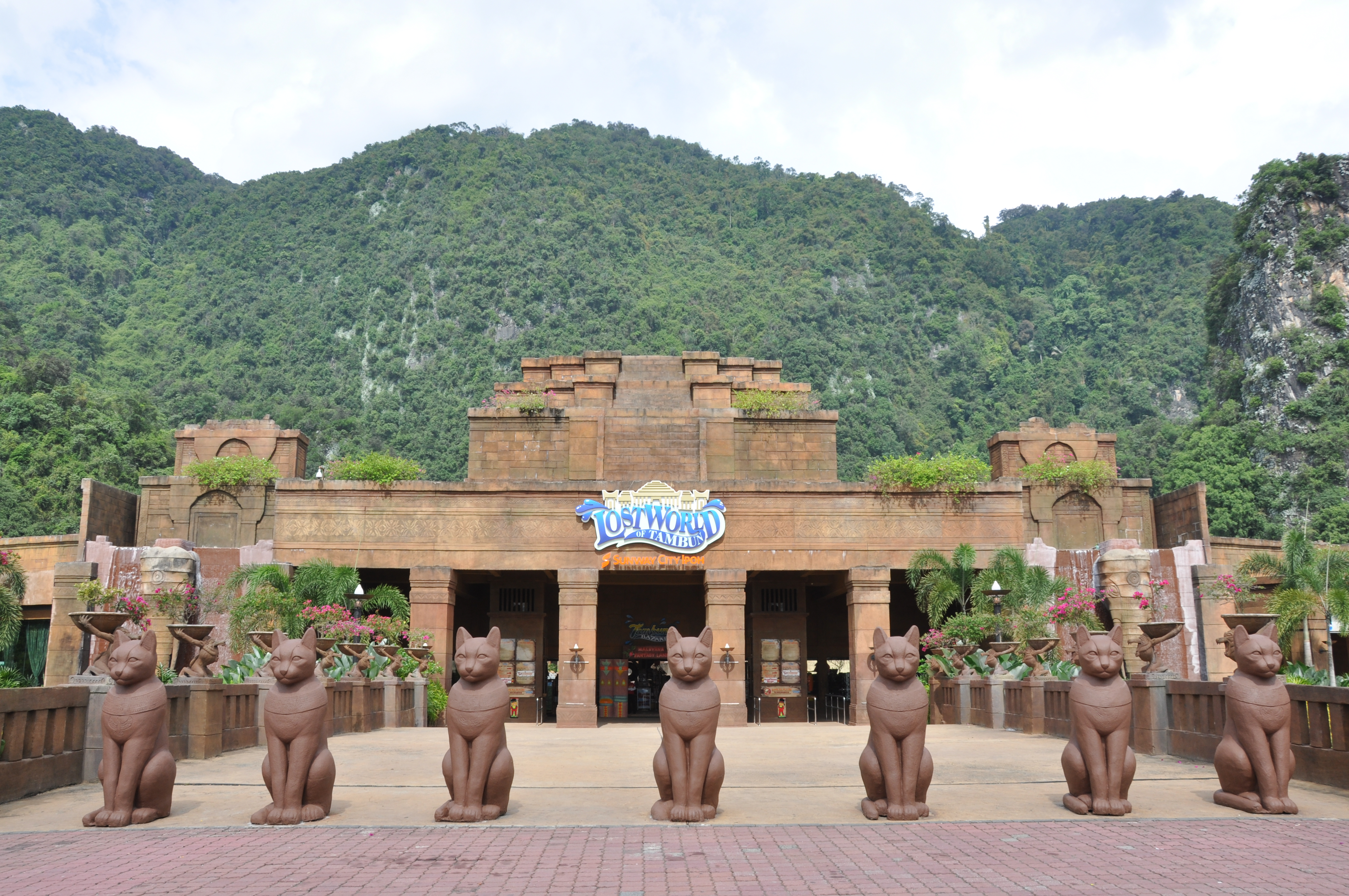
- Interactive map of Lost World of Tambun
- Location: Sunway City, Tambun, Ipoh, Perak, Malaysia
- Coordinates: 4°37′32.9″N 101°09′18.6″E
- Opened: 11 October 2004
- Operated by: Sunway Group
- Area: 16 ha (40 acres)
- Website: sunwaylostworldoftambun.com

The Lost World of Tambun (LWOT) is a theme park and hotel in Sunway City, Tambun, in the Malaysian city of Ipoh. Managed by the Sunway Group, the 40 acres (16 ha) park opened on 11 November 2004.

== Construction ==
The park was built within the surroundings of limestone hills over an area of 7,432 m^{2}.

== See also ==
- List of tourist attractions in Perak
