= Sukhavana =

Monastery in Perak, Malaysia

Sukhavana Meditation Monastery

Religion
- Affiliation: Thai Forest Tradition

Location
- Location: Bercham Cave, Ipoh, Perak, Malaysia
- Country: Malaysia

Architecture
- Founder: Buddhist Yogis

Website
- www.sukhavana.org

Sukhavana Meditation Monastery is a monastery in the Thai Forest Tradition of the Theravada lineage of Buddhism. Sukhavana Meditation Monastery is a centre of teaching and practice. It is located in the Bercham Cave, Ipoh, Perak, Malaysia. Sukhavana means "The Mountain Of Happiness " in Pāli, the Buddhist scriptural language of the ancient Canon. The temple was founded by the disciples of the noted Thai Buddhist Monk. Its current abbot is Ajahn Tong Bai.

Sukhavana Meditation Monastery also has a retreat centre, where meditation retreats of varying lengths are held for lay people, and which is run on donations.

== See also ==
- Buddhism in Malaysia
