= Bercham =

Suburb of Ipoh in Perak, Malaysia

Coordinates: 04°38′30″N 101°07′40″E

Bercham (Jawi: برچم) is a suburb of Ipoh next to the North–South Expressway in Perak, Malaysia. It is located between the Ipoh South Interchange of North–South Expressway and Ipoh city. It is near Ipoh Garden, Tasek, Tambun and Tanjung Rambutan. There are a number of housing estates in Bercham.

Bercham began as a tin mining town but later evolved to its present status when the tin deposits dwindled. It covers 8,877 hectares of which 56% of the land is utilized for housing, industry and agriculture. As at 2009, the population of Bercham was 150,000 that would be about 20% of the Ipoh's population of 702,464 in the same year.

A short drive to the end of the town near to Taman Ramai, lie two generally unexplored tourist attractions - Gunung Bercham (Kuan Yin Hill) and a Thai Buddhist temple. The temple existed as a shed some 15 years ago founded by a woman called Wan Yee whom also served as the caretaker of the temple. In 1990 the cashier of the temple Ting Cheong Meng was given the authority to rebuild. A hill track was built on the slope of Kuan Yin Hill, allowing visitors to climb up the hill top which offers the amazing skyline view of Bercham and Tasek.

Bercham had two other small hills, including the Gunung Tambun Tengah (at Bercham Heights) which is the largest and tallest hill in Bercham, known to host a number of interesting wildlife including the red junglefowl, dusky langur, white-rumped shama, blue rock-thrush, bat hawk, Tickell's blue flycatcher, owls, squirrels, eagles, etc. Some temples are located here, such as the Huat Tian Keong temple and the Sukhavana Meditation Monastery. Another small hill, Gunung Temlang (located near Bandar Baru Putra) is being mined and only half of the hill is present today.

Bercham police station is the winner of best practices among police stations, scored the highest among the participating stations from Malaysia, Pakistan, India and South Korea. It shows that Bercham police station is the best in community orientation, physical conditions, equal treatment, transparency and accountability as well as detention conditions categories. This programme was surveyed by The Hague-based Altus Global Alliance.

== History ==
Present-day Bercham is located between what were once known as Kampung Tanjung Rangkong and Kampung Kuala Tekan, two ancient Malay settlements in Kinta that witnessed the exploits of ex-Panglima Kinta Zainal Abidin, who had orchards and paddy fields somewhere in the vicinity. A mysterious Malay mining tycoon who hid behind the alias Kulup Lembang (well known in Tambun) also had mining properties somewhere nearby.

== Gardens ==
- Kampung Baru Bercham
- Taman Ramai
- Taman Mujur
- Taman Restu
- Anjung Bercham Megah
- Taman Bercham Cahaya
- Taman Bercham Sinar
- Taman Desa Kencana
- Taman Utama
- Taman Bercham Raya
- Taman Medan Bercham
- Taman Pakatan
- Taman Pakatan Jaya
- Taman Mewah
- Gerbang Bercham Selamat
- Anjung Bercham Elit
- Taman Seri Dermawan
- Taman Seri Gaya
- Taman Ria
- Taman Tasek Indra
- Kampung Tersusun Tasek
- Taman Bercham Idaman
- Taman Sri Kurau
- Taman Shukur
- Taman Bercham Permai @ Ridgewood
- Taman Rima Gamelan
- Taman Seri Bercham
- Taman Suria

== Popular food ==
- Claypot chicken rice (瓦煲鸡饭)
- Dim sum (点心)
- Fish head curry (咖哩鱼头)
- Dou fu fa (豆腐花)
- Ipoh shredded chicken hor fun (鸡丝河粉)
- Namzai Charsiew (腩仔叉烧)

== Schools ==
- SMK Bercham, secondary school
- SRJK (C) Bercham, Chinese mainstream primary school
- SMK Jalan Tasek, secondary school near Bercham
- SK Tasek Dermawan
