= Chemor =

Town in Kinta District, Perak, Malaysia

Chemor Jawi: چيمور
- Town
- Interactive map of Chemor
- Coordinates: 4°43′N 101°07′E
- Country: Malaysia
- State: Perak
- District: Kinta District

Chemor (Jawi: چيمور) is a main town in Kinta District, Perak, Malaysia.

== Geography ==
Chemor is located in the Kinta River Valley. The region surrounding Chemor consists of limestone hills and cliffs, composed largely of alluvium deposited in the Paleozoic era.

== History ==
=== 19th century ===
Chemor was one of several towns in Kinta District which sprang up in the late 19th century to take advantage of the region's tin mining opportunities. Of these towns, it was the northernmost. The first attestation of the town's existence was in 1892, when a police station was opened in the then-village. Chemor grew significantly over the next several years, with a significant tin discovery in 1896 marking a major expansion of the town's mining industry. That same year, a railway station incorporating a post office and telegraph station was opened in the town, followed by a market and a new police station the next year. By the late 1890s, Chemor was also connected to the nearby towns of Ipoh and Pari by road.

=== 20th and 21st centuries ===
In the early 20th century, Chemor saw further expansion: rubber plantations were founded in the town, and a temple and a Chinese opera theatre were built. A significant new deposit of tin was discovered in 1925. Both European and Chinese companies were involved in the tin and rubber industries in the town.

During the Malayan Emergency, Kinta District was strongly populated with Communist militias, which conducted several several grenade attacks, kidnappings, and assassinations in Chemor in the early 1950s. Support for the communists was largely along ethnic lines; the Sumatran population of the town were strongly opposed.

Chemor railway station was demolished in 2012.
