= Tambun =

Town in Kinta District, Perak, Malaysia

Coordinates: 4°37′N 101°08′E

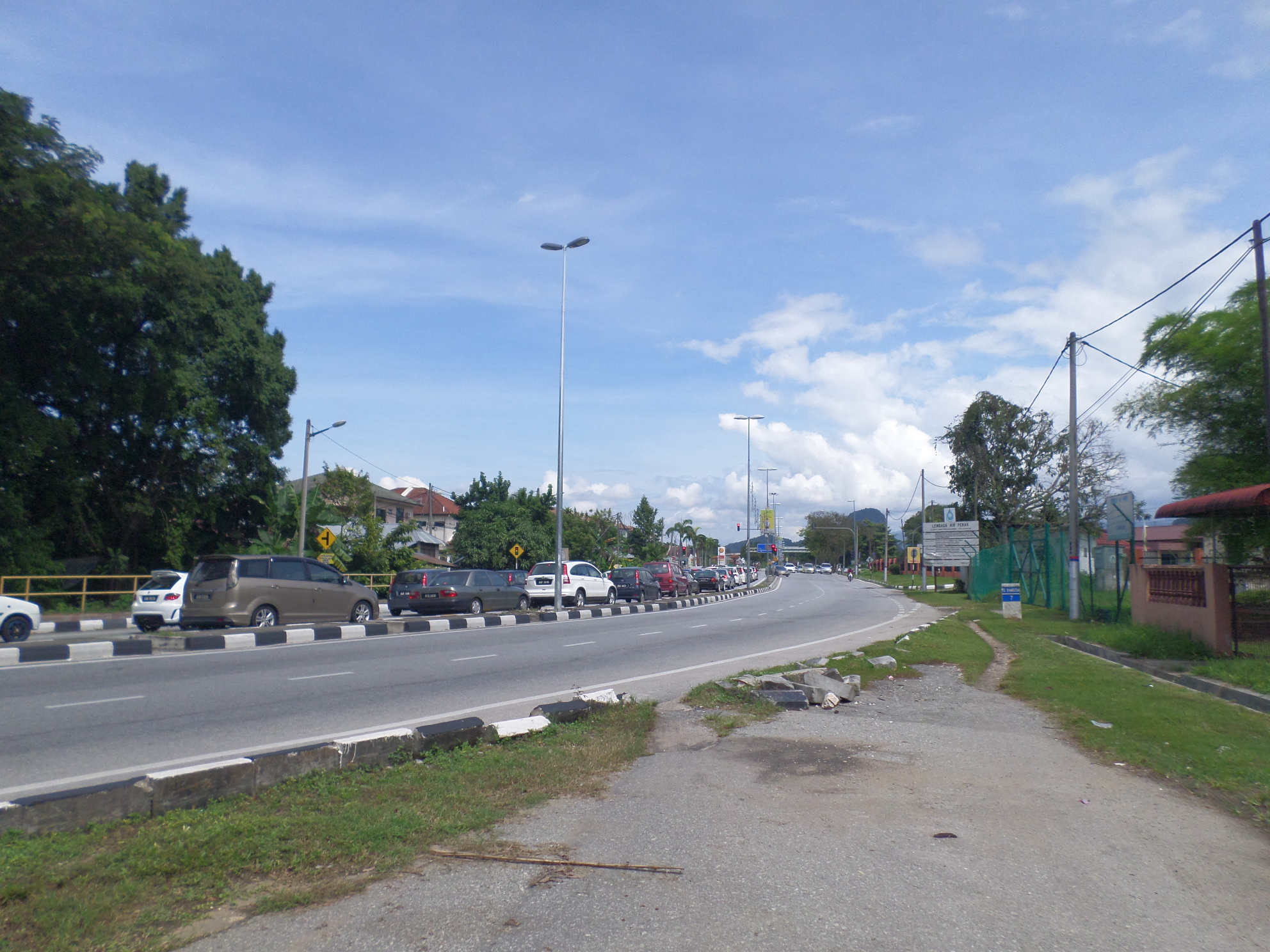
Tambun

Tambun (Jawi: تمبون; Chinese: 打扪) is a town and a suburb of Ipoh in Perak, Malaysia. The Lost World of Tambun, a waterpark, is located there, as is the prehistoric Tambun rock art.
