= Jelapang, Perak =

Jelapang
- Town in Malaysia

Other transcription(s)
  - Jawi: قراص
  - Chinese: 九洞
  - Tamil: ஜெலாப்பாங்
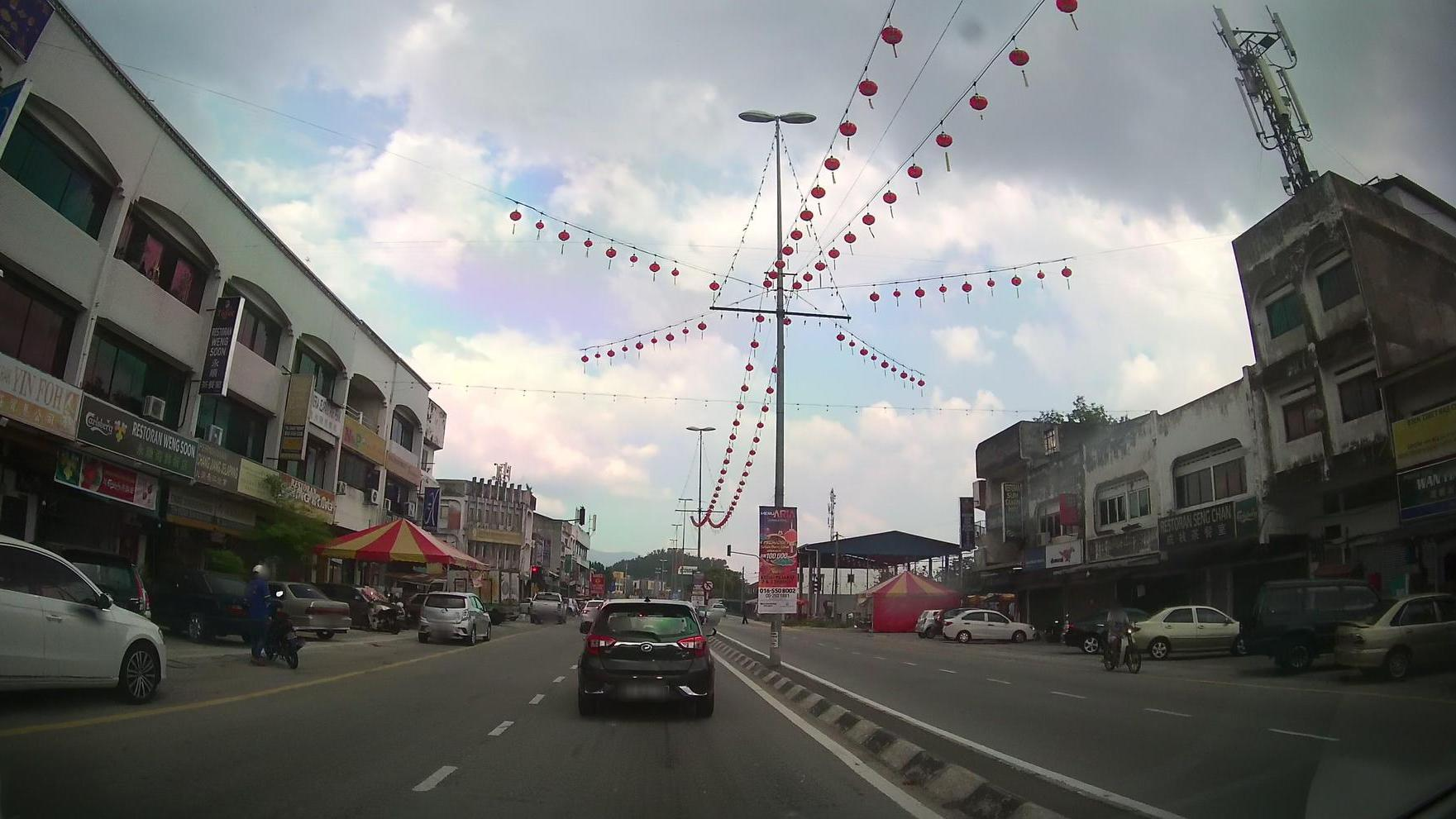
- Jelapang main street

- Jelapang in Perak, Malay Peninsular and Malaysia Jelapang (Peninsular Malaysia) Jelapang (Malaysia)
- Coordinates: 4°38′N 101°04′E
- Country: Malaysia
- State: Perak
- District: Kinta
- Time zone: UTC+8 (MYT)
- Postal code: 30020

Jelapang is a town in Kinta District, Perak, Malaysia. It is a northern suburb of Ipoh, the state capital.

It was also the site of the infamous Jelapang toll plaza of the North–South Expressway. The toll plaza was "infamous" due to its reputation as an accident-prone area. This was because drivers coming from a high slope from the direction of Changkat Jering (exiting from the Menora Tunnel towards Ipoh) have to suddenly slow down upon reaching the toll plaza and some speeding vehicles have crashed into the booths previously.
