= List of tourist attractions in Perak =

Tourist attractions in Perak, Malaysia

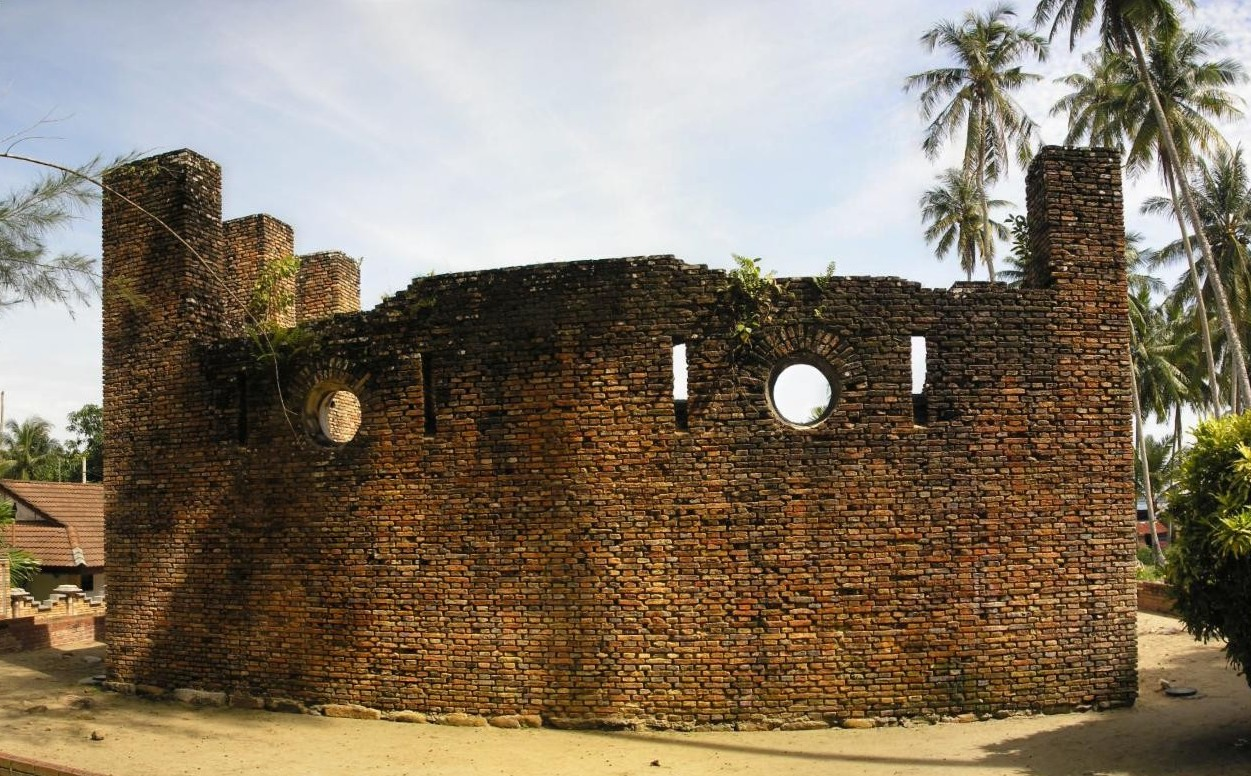
Dutch Fort

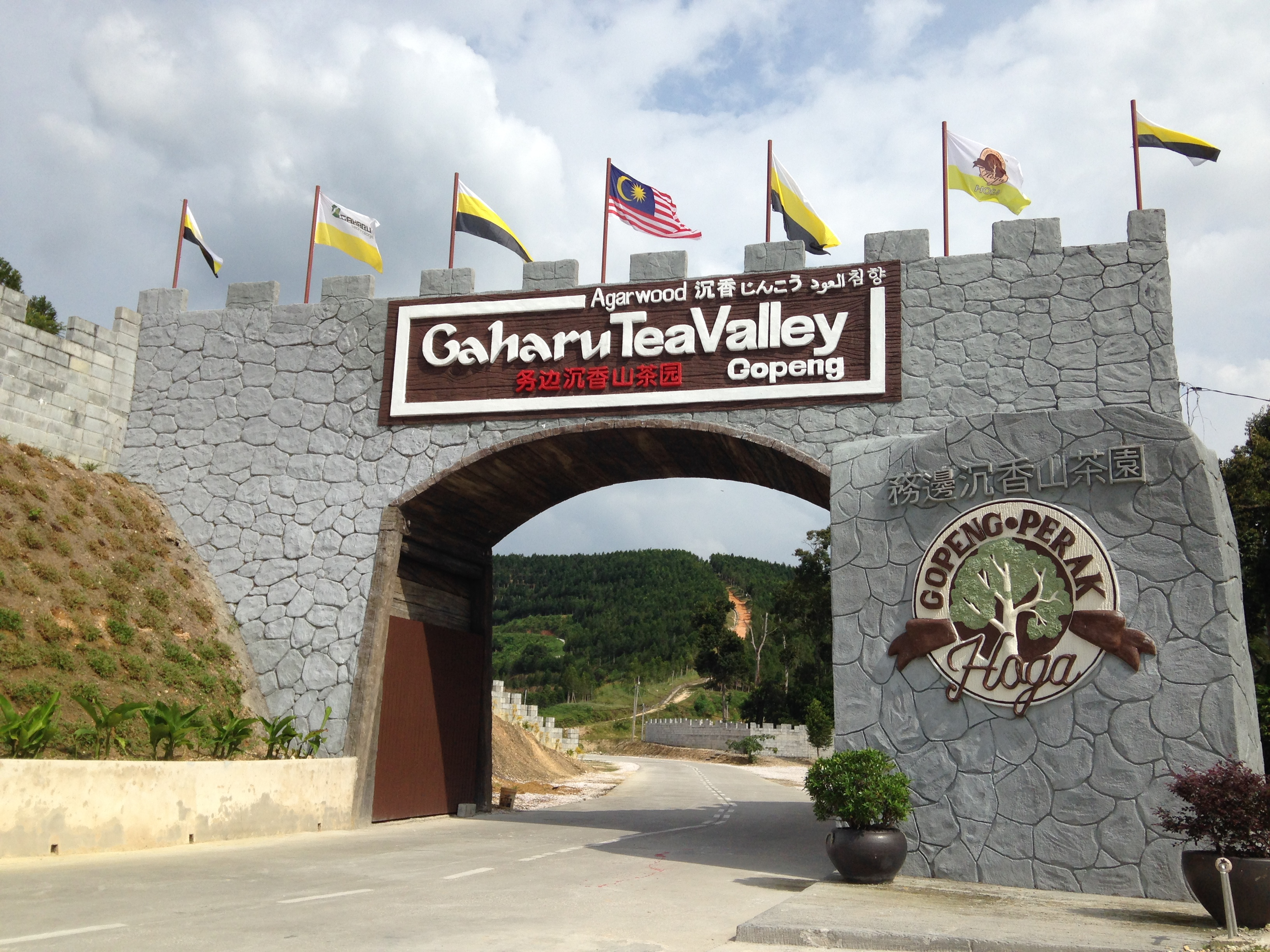
Gaharu Tea Valley

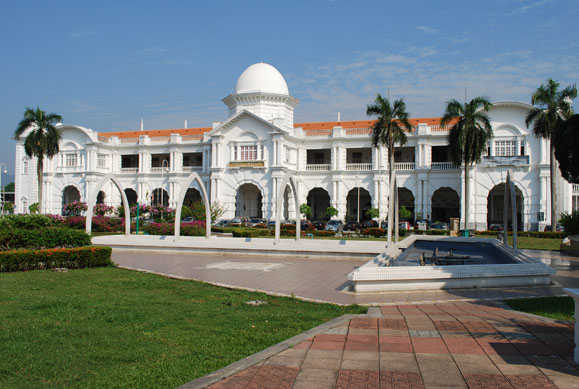
Ipoh Railway Station

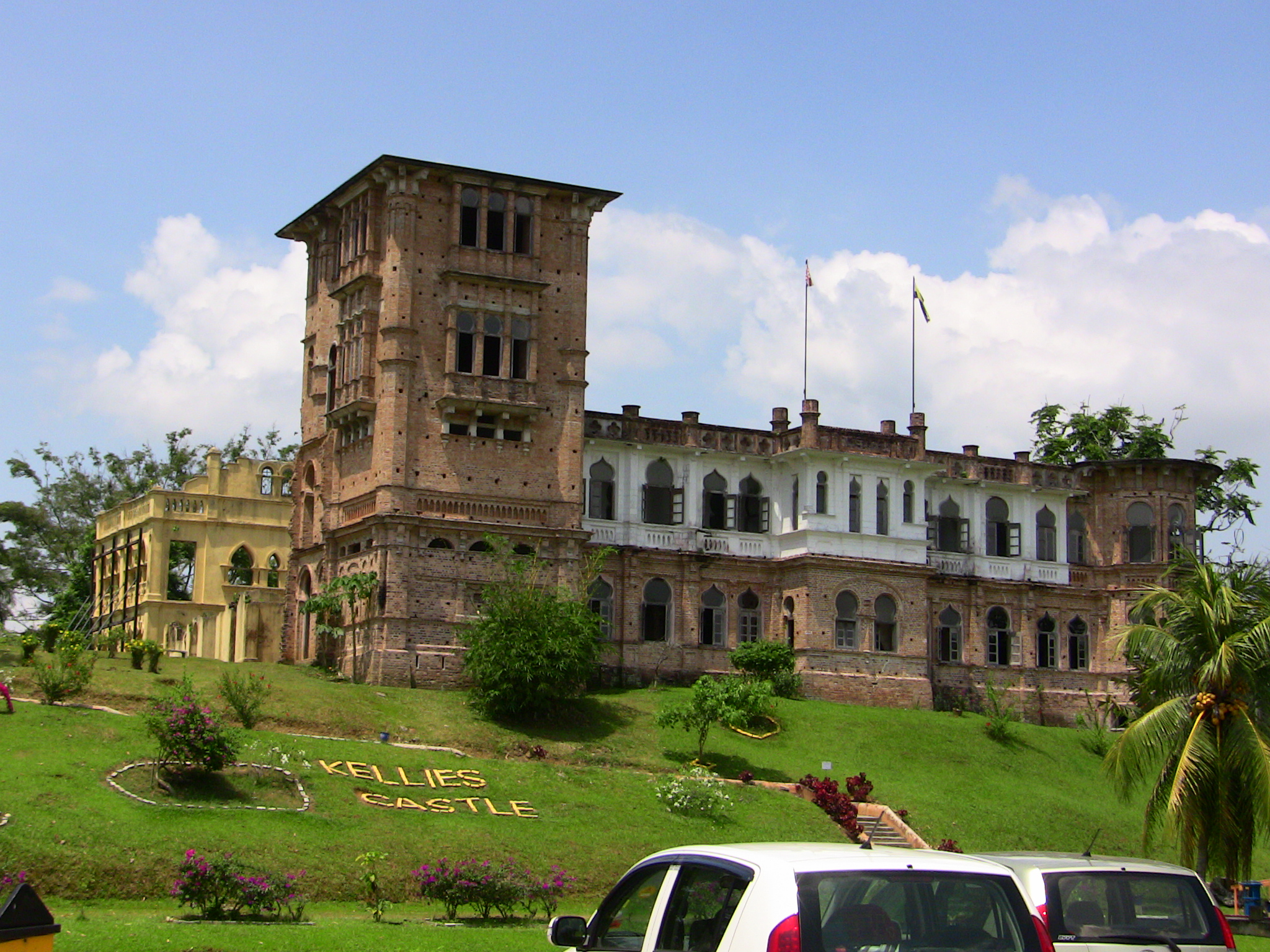
Kellie's Castle

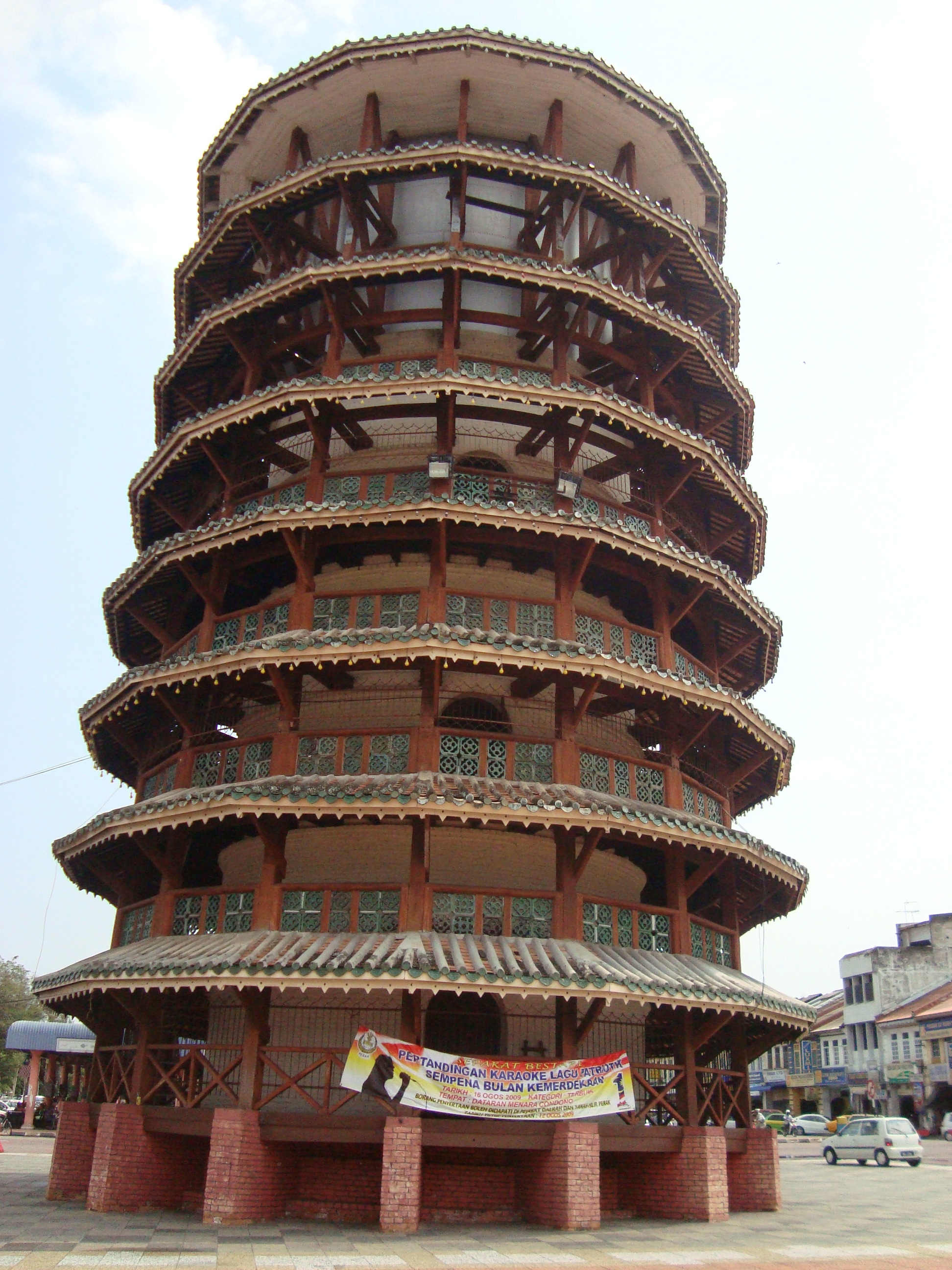
Leaning Tower of Teluk Intan

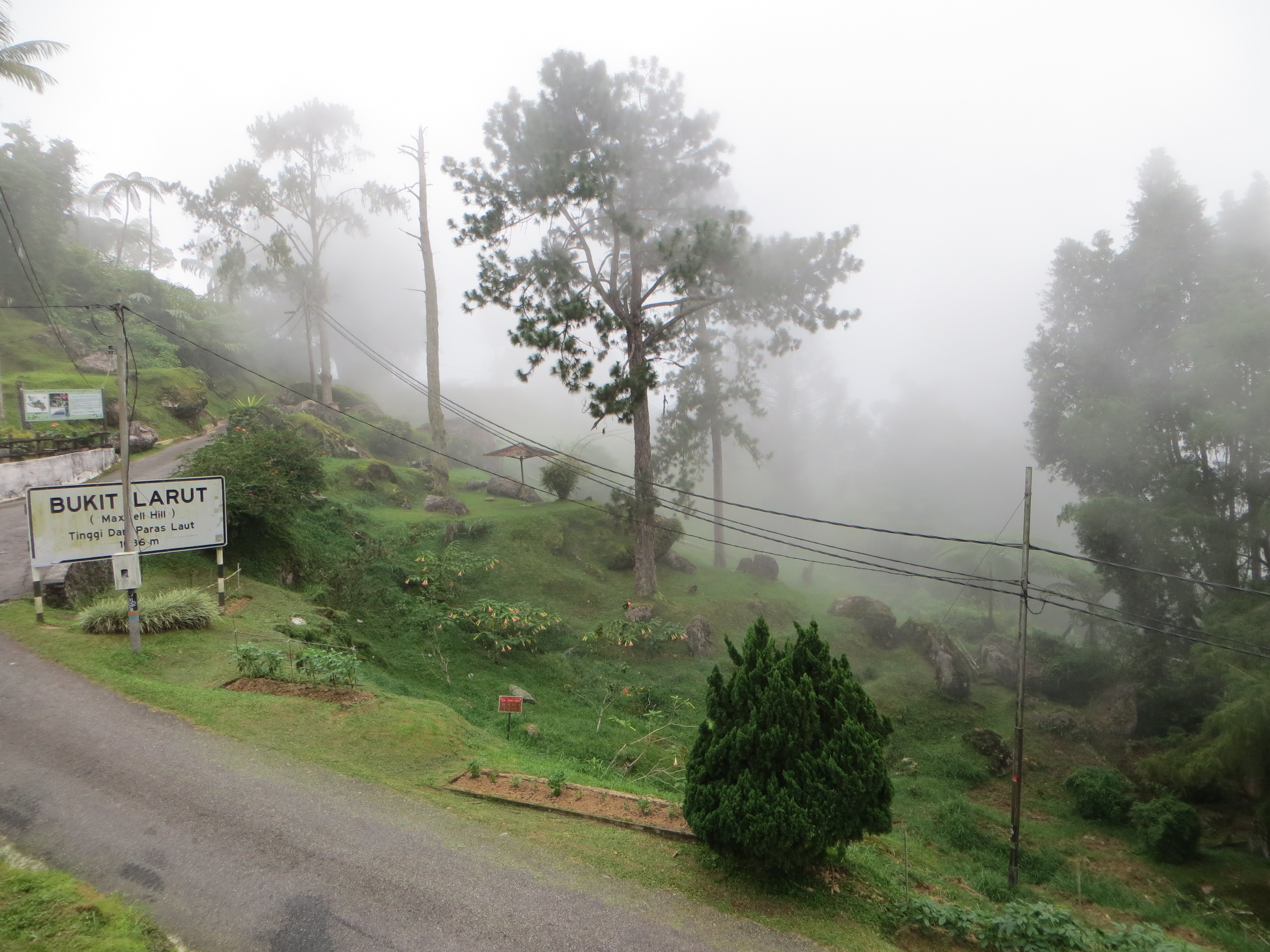
Maxwell Hill

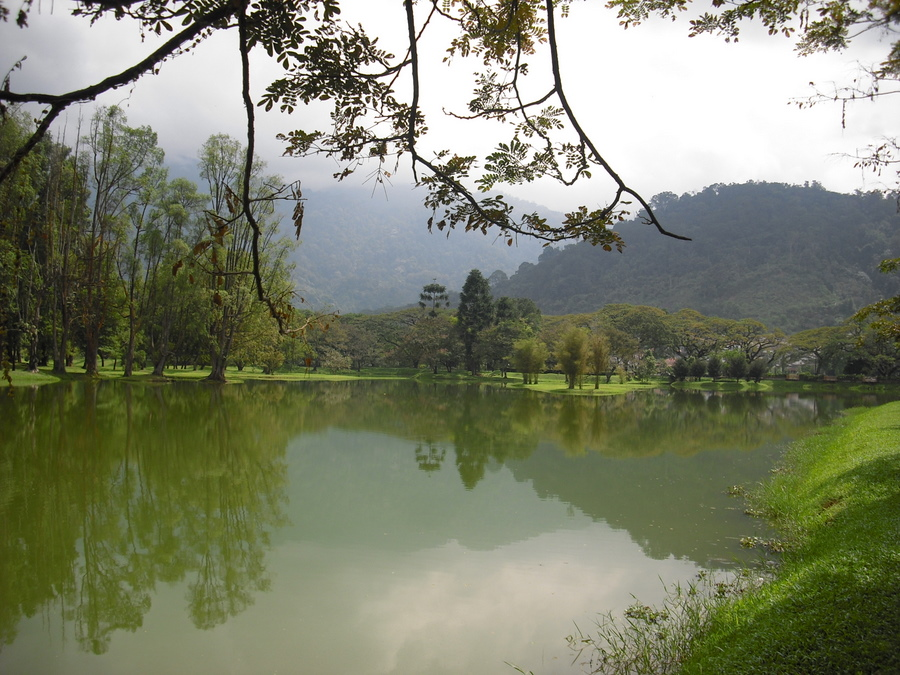
Taiping Lake Gardens

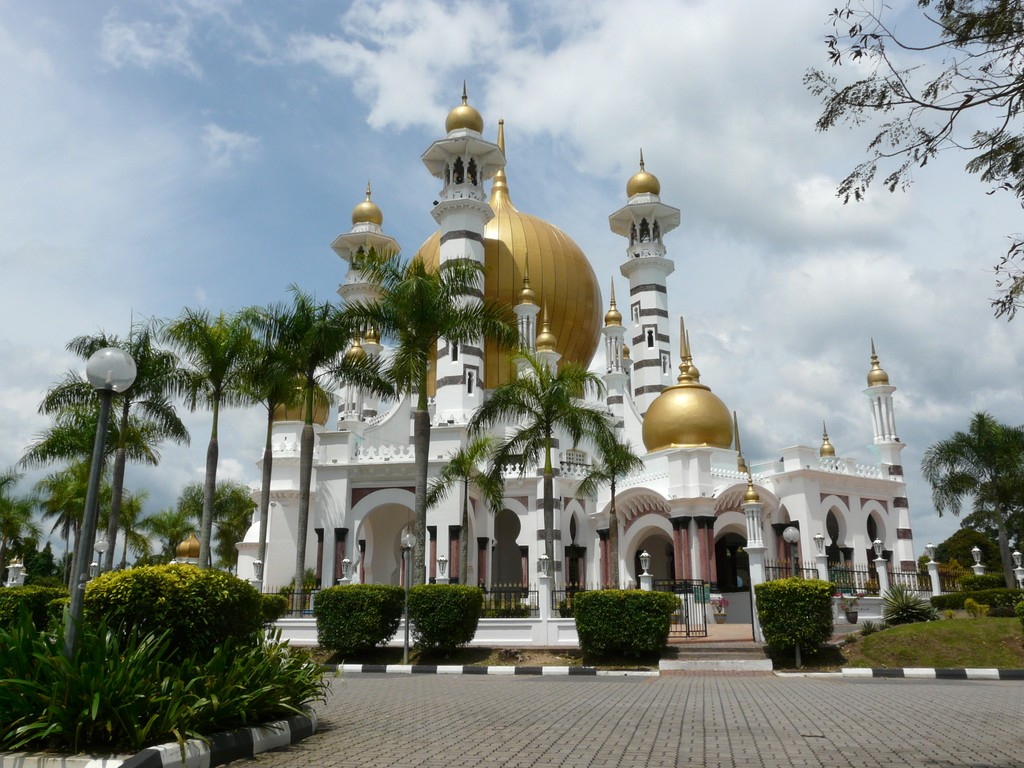
Ubudiah Mosque

This is the list of tourist attractions in Perak, Malaysia.

== Galleries ==
- Sultan Azlan Shah Gallery

== Historical buildings ==
- Birch Memorial Clock Tower
- Dutch Fort
- Ipoh Railway Station
- Kellie's Castle
- Ngah Ibrahim's Fort

== Memorials ==
- Al-Ghufran Royal Mausoleum
- Taiping War Cemetery

== Museums ==
- Beruas Museum
- Darul Ridzuan Museum
- Geological Museum
- Palong Tin Museum
- Perak Museum
- Perak Royal Museum
- Sitiawan Settlement Museum

== Nature ==
- Gaharu Tea Valley
- Maxwell Hill
- Tempurung Cave
- Pangkor Island
- Taiping Lake Gardens

== Religious places ==
=== Buddhist temples ===
- Sasanarakkha Buddhist Sanctuary
- Sukhavana Meditation Monastery

=== Chinese temples ===
- Sam Poh Tong Temple (三寶洞)
- Kek Look Seah Temple (極樂社)
- Tow Boh Keong Temple (斗母宮)

=== Church ===
- All Saints' Church
- Wesley Methodist Church

=== Hindu temple ===
- Arulmigu Maha Muthu Mariamman Thevasthanam

=== Mosque ===
- Sultan Idris Shah II Mosque
- Ubudiah Mosque
- Town Padang Mosque

== Sport centres ==
- Azlan Shah Stadium
- DBI Sports Complex
- Perak Stadium
- Proton City Stadium
- Velodrome Rakyat

== Shopping centres ==
- Markets of Taiping
- Mallridzuan (upcoming)

== Theme parks ==
- Lost World of Tambun
- MAPS Perak

== Towers ==
- Leaning Tower of Teluk Intan

== Transportation ==
- Iskandariah Bridge
- Sultan Abdul Jalil Shah Bridge
- Temenggor Lake Bridge
- Victoria Bridge

== Zoo ==
- Zoo Taiping

== See also ==
- List of tourist attractions in Malaysia
