= Mining in Malaysia =

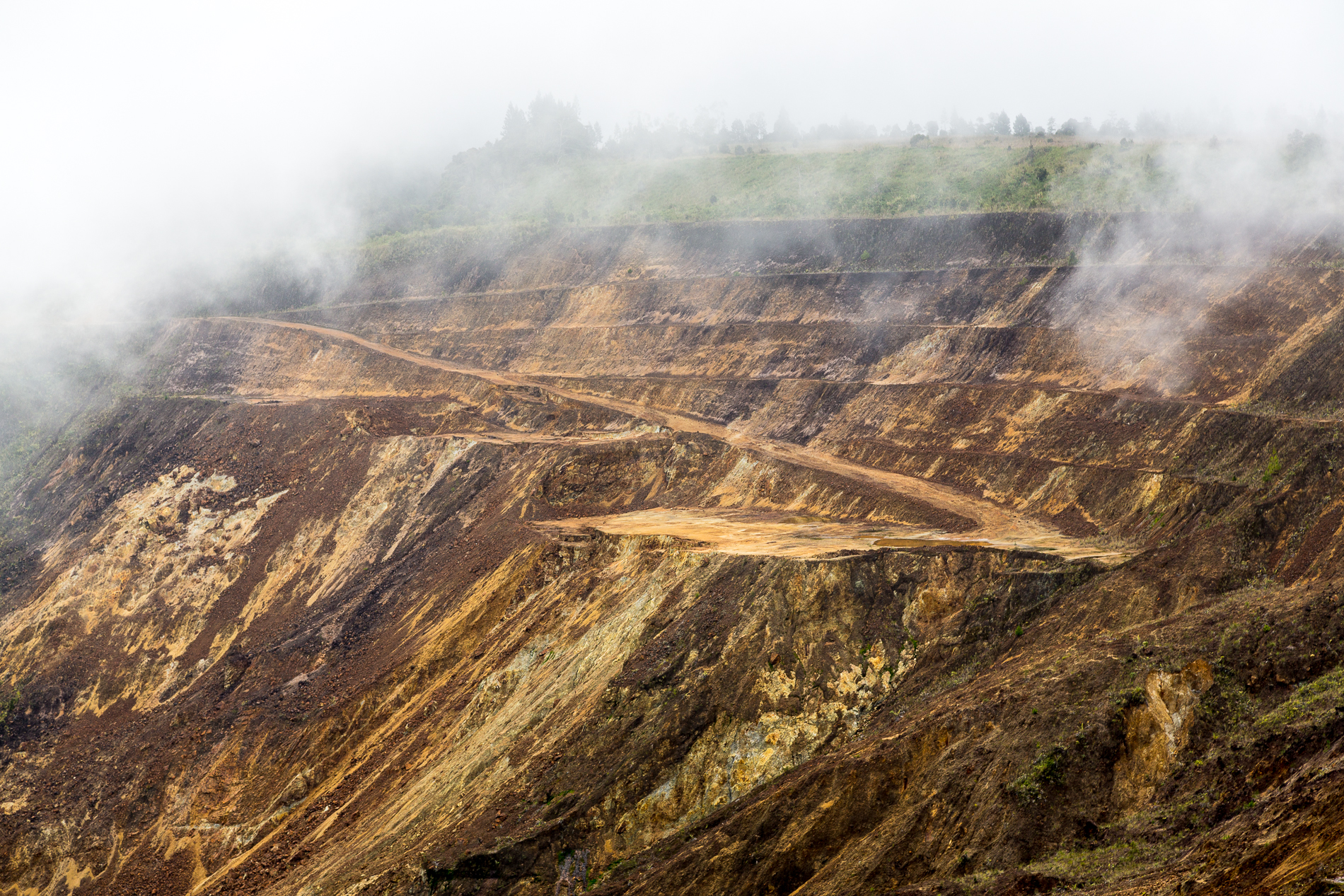
Copper mine in Sabah.

Mining is one of the main industries in Malaysia. Malaysia produces aggregate, bauxite, clay, coal, copper, feldspar, gold, gravel, ilmenite, iron ore, kaolin, limestone, manganese, mica, monazite, sand, silica sand, struverite and tin.

== History ==
Tin mining in Perak around 1910.

Tin mining is one of the earliest type of mining operated in Malaysia, starting in the 1820s in Perak and in 1824 in Selangor. The development of mining industries in Malaysia attracted many Chinese immigrants who came to the state in 18th and 19th centuries to work and develop the mines. The majority of Malayan tin mined prior to the Second World War was being extracted by European companies (58.6%), mostly British, but also Australian, French, and American-owned; the balance (41.4%) was being mined by Chinese companies. During this time, the British administration was attempting to organise Malaya's economy, especially as revenue from Malaya's tin and rubber industries was important to Britain's own post-war recovery. This massive rehabilitation programme was economically successful, with tin production rising to 55,000 tons in 1949, a ten-fold increase in value over four years.

== Government ==
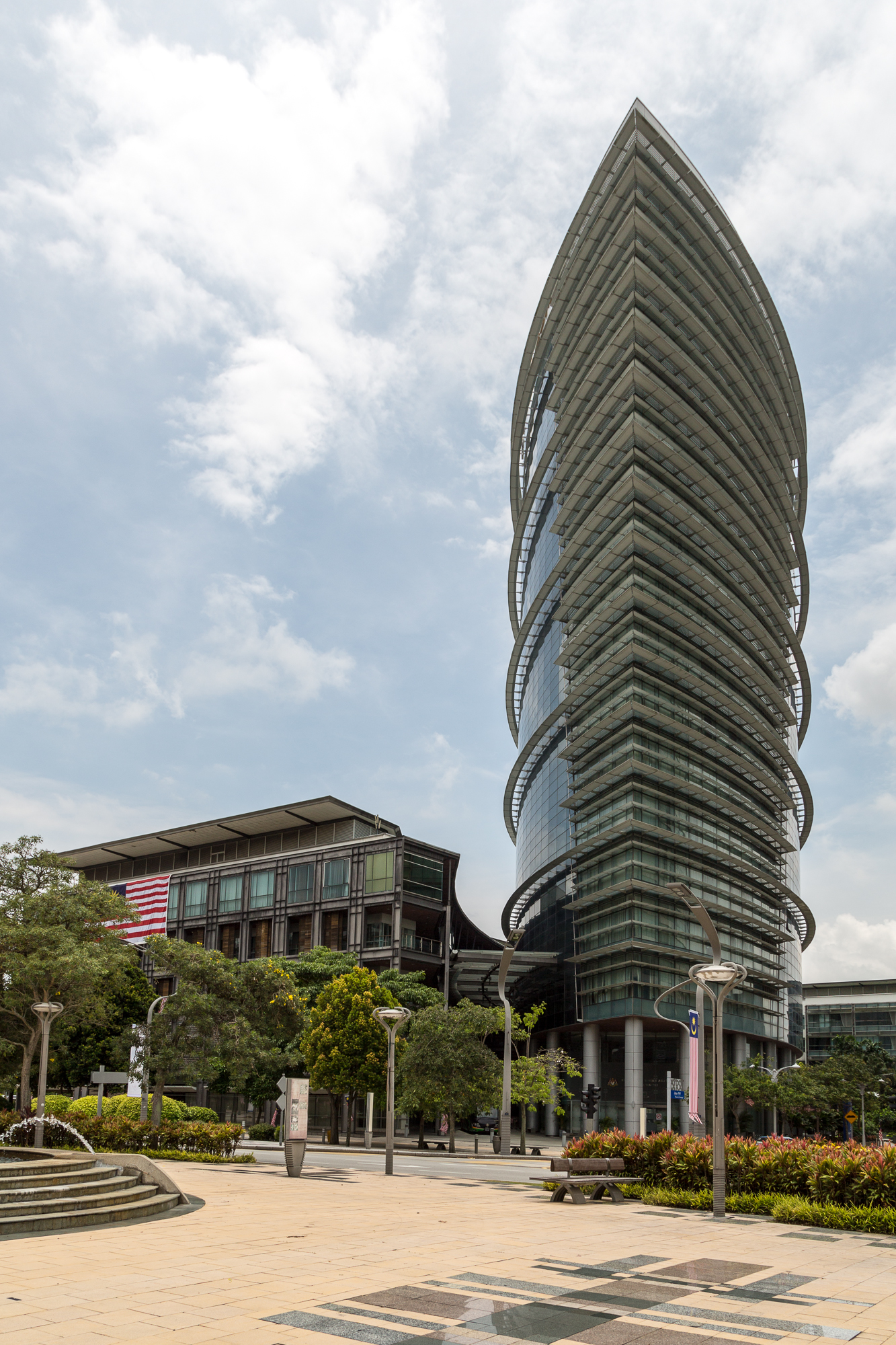
Ministry of Water, Land and Natural Resources

Mining-related activities in Malaysia is regulated by the Ministry of Water, Land and Natural Resources.

== Types of mining ==
=== Aggregate ===
Aggregate is produced in Malaysia from quarry and river bed which are mostly found in Johor, Perak, Sabah, Sarawak and Selangor. In 2012, the annual production of aggregate was 122,000,000 tons.

=== Bauxite ===
Bauxite is produced in Johor and Pahang. In 2012, the annual production of bauxite was 117,232 tons. In 2016, the Malaysian government bans bauxite mining activities until end of the year due to environmental damage and water contamination in Kuantan.

=== Clay ===
Clay deposits in Malaysia are mostly found in Johor, Kedah, Kelantan, Negeri Sembilan, Pahang, Penang, Perak, Sarawak, Selangor and Terengganu. In 2012, the annual production of clay was 29,000,000 tons.

=== Coal ===
Major coal reserves in Malaysia are mostly located in Sabah and Sarawak with smaller reserves in Perak, Perlis and Selangor. The Labuan coal field produced coal starting 1848 until 1912. As of 1986, coal reserve in Malaysia was 965 million tons in which mostly are bituminous coal. The total known coal area is 5,823 km^{2}. In 2012, the annual production of coal was 2.9 million tons.

=== Feldspar ===
Feldspar deposits in Malaysia are limited, but can be found in Johor, Kedah, Kelantan, Negeri Sembilan, Pahang and Perak. In 2012, the annual production of feldspar was 350,000 tons.

=== Gold ===
Major gold mines in Malaysia are in Pahang, namely Penjom, Raub and Selinsing, as well as some minor areas in Kelantan and Terengganu. In 2011, the annual production of gold was 4,219 kg. As of 2012, there are active 15 gold mines.

Bau, Sarawak, was a hub for Chinese Malaysian gold miners in the 1800s, with periodic revivals in mining throughout the 20th century. In 2024, 3.3 million ounces of gold were discovered in the Bau area.

=== Iron ore ===
Currently there are 98 iron ore mines in operation in Malaysia. Most of them are small mines operating in Johor, Kedah, Kelantan, Malacca, Pahang, Perak and Terengganu. In 2012, the annual production of iron ore was 10,077,136 tons.

=== Kaolin ===
Kaolin reserves in Malaysia is estimated to be around 112 million tons which are spread in Johor, Kelantan, Pahang, Perak, Sarawak and Selangor. In 2012, the annual production of kaolin was 390,000 tons.

=== Limestone ===
Limestone deposit in Malaysia is abundant, with reserve estimated to be 12 billion tons located throughout Kedah, Kelantan, Negeri Sembilan, Pahang, Perak, Perlis, Sabah Sarawak and Selangor. In 2012, the annual production of limestone was 36 million tons.

=== Mica ===
There are two mica mines in Malaysia, which are located in Bidor, Perak. In 2012, the annual production of mica was 4,000 tons.

=== Sand and gravel ===
Sand and gravel are found in Johor, Kedah, Perak, Sarawak and Selangor. In 2012, the annual production of sand and gravel was 40 million tons.

=== Tin ===
In 1979, Malaysia produced almost 63,000 tons of tin, accounting for 31% of world's output. Tin deposit spreads across western Peninsular Malaysia, particularly the Kinta Valley in Perak. In 1883, Malaysia was the largest tin producer in the world. In 1885, 12.8 km of railway was constructed connecting Taiping to Port Weld in Perak. The first trunk road in Peninsular Malaysia was constructed passing through major mining towns in Perak, Selangor and Negeri Sembilan in which it was mostly used to transport tin from mines to ports. In the 1920s, dredging machines were introduced to boost the production of tin. Starting from the 1980s, tin mining in Malaysia experienced sharp decline due to competition from Brazil and the falling of tin price. In 1989, the Malaysian Tin Products Manufacturers' Association was established to promote and protect the downstream business of tin industry in the country.

== Environmental restoration ==
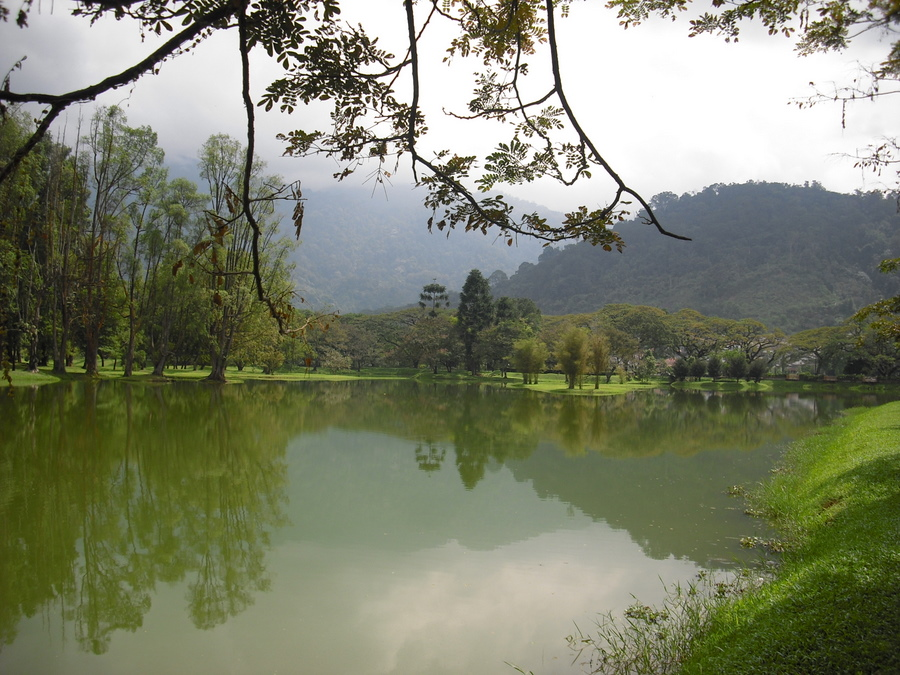
Former mine which has been converted into a lake garden in Perak.

The Government of Malaysia had initiated research for the development of agriculture and aquaculture in former mining lands. Some of the restored areas from mining activities have also been converted into public houses or tourist attractions, such as:

- Mines Wellness City
- Sunway Lagoon
- Taiping Lake Gardens
- Titiwangsa Lake Gardens
- Bukit Merah Laketown Resort

== Tourism ==
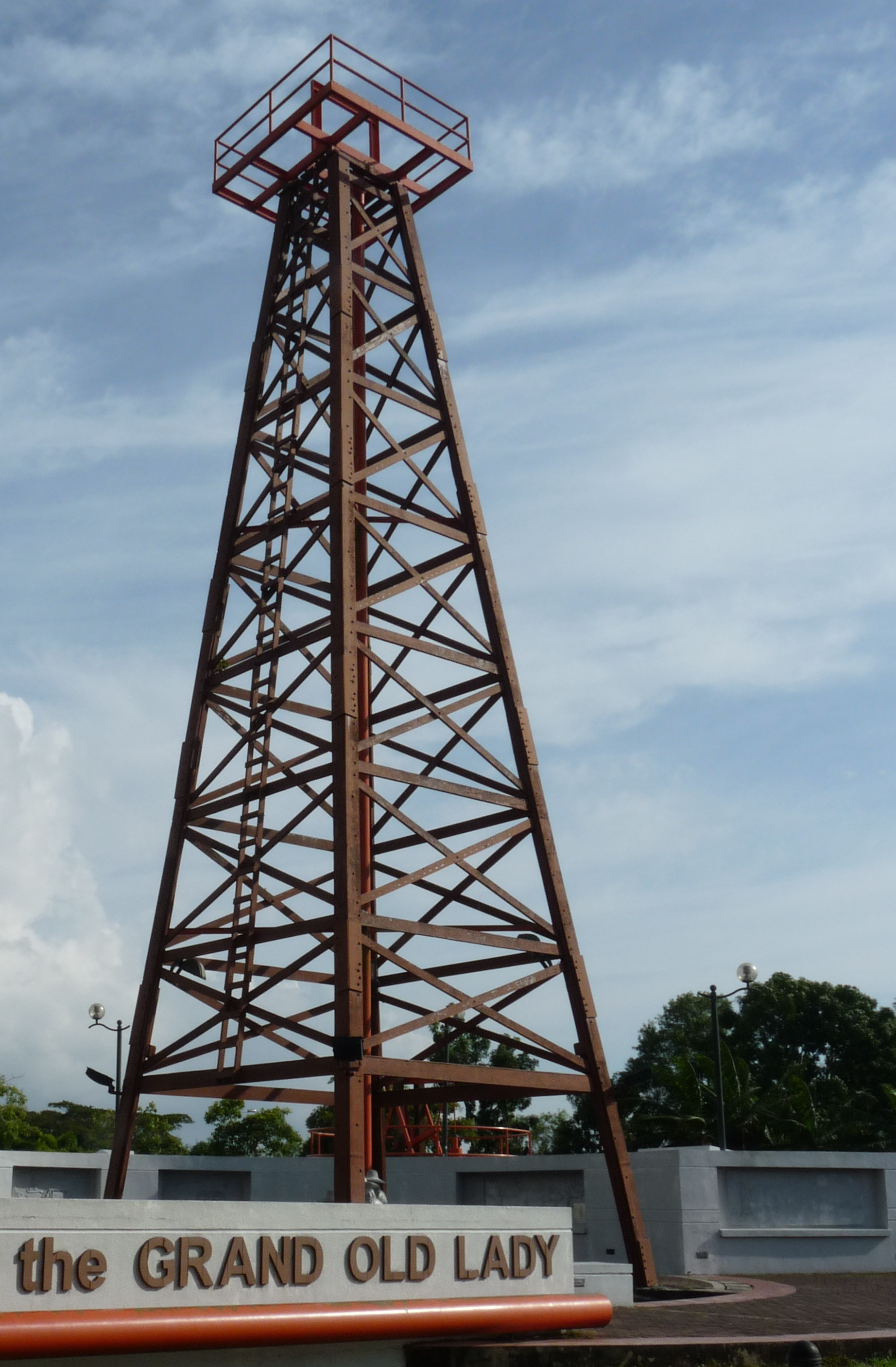
Petroleum Museum in Sarawak.

Mining-related tourism in Malaysia are:

- Chimney Museum
- Geological Museum
- Palong Tin Museum
- Petroleum Museum
- Tanjung Tualang Tin Dredge No. 5
- Kinta Tin Mining (Gravel Pump) Museum Kampar

== See also ==
- Economy of Malaysia
