= MBI Sports Complex =

Sports venue in Ipoh, Perak, Malaysia

MBI Sports Complex Kompleks Sukan Majlis Bandaraya Ipoh
- Interactive map of MBI Sports Complex; Kompleks Sukan Majlis Bandaraya Ipoh
- Location: Ipoh, Perak, Malaysia
- Coordinates: 4°36′33.89″N 101°6′12.44″E
- Owner: Majlis Bandaraya Ipoh (MBI)
- Capacity: 30,000
- Surface: Grass pitch Track

Tenant
- Perak FA

The MBI Sports Complex (Malay: Kompleks Sukan Majlis Bandaraya Ipoh) is a multi-use sports complex in Ipoh, Perak, Malaysia. It consists of various sports facilities such as the Perak Stadium (football and track and field), Velodrome Rakyat (cycling), Indera Mulia Stadium (indoor stadium), Sultan Azlan Shah Stadium (field hockey), swimming complex, gymnasium as well as badminton, squash and tennis courts. The Perak Stadium is currently used mostly for football matches. The stadium has a capacity of 30,000 people. It was built in 1997.

== See also ==
- Sport in Malaysia
