= Palong Tin Museum =

Museum in Kinta, Perak, Malaysia

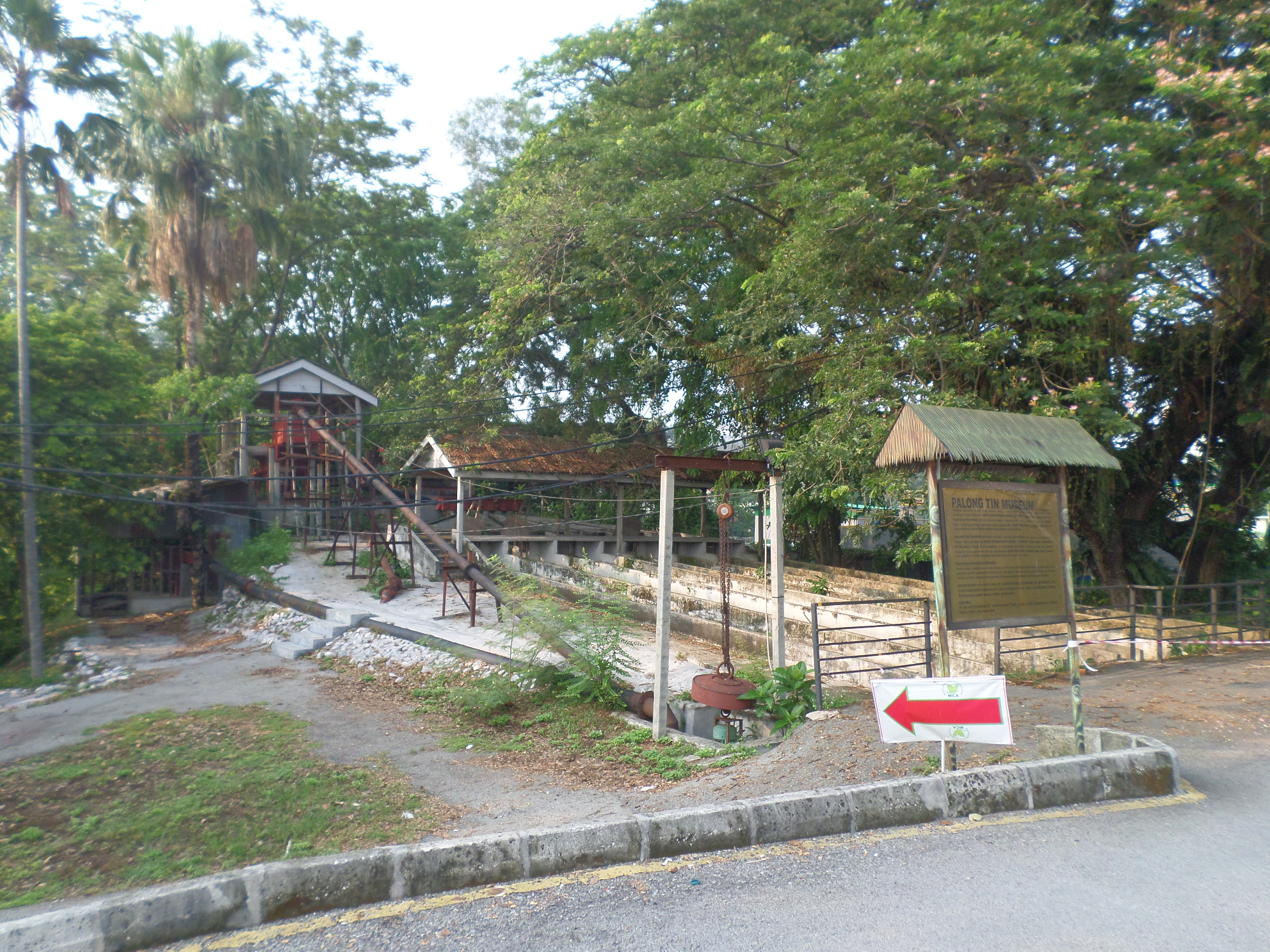
- Established: July 1995
- Location: Ipoh, Perak, Malaysia
- Coordinates: 4°36′11.1″N 101°4′51.4″E
- Type: museum

The Palong Tin Museum is a museum in Ipoh, Kinta District, Perak, Malaysia.

== History ==
The establishment of the museum is part of tourism-related project undertook by Kinta Riverfront Hotel and Suites in collaboration with Ipoh City Council and Perak Water and Drainage Department, which also includes the beautification of Kinta River side landscape.

== Exhibitions ==
The museum exhibits information on Malaysia mining history, Kinta Valley tin mining activities, mining methods etc.

== See also ==
- List of museums in Malaysia
- List of tourist attractions in Perak
- Mining in Malaysia
