= Mamut Mine =

Copper mine

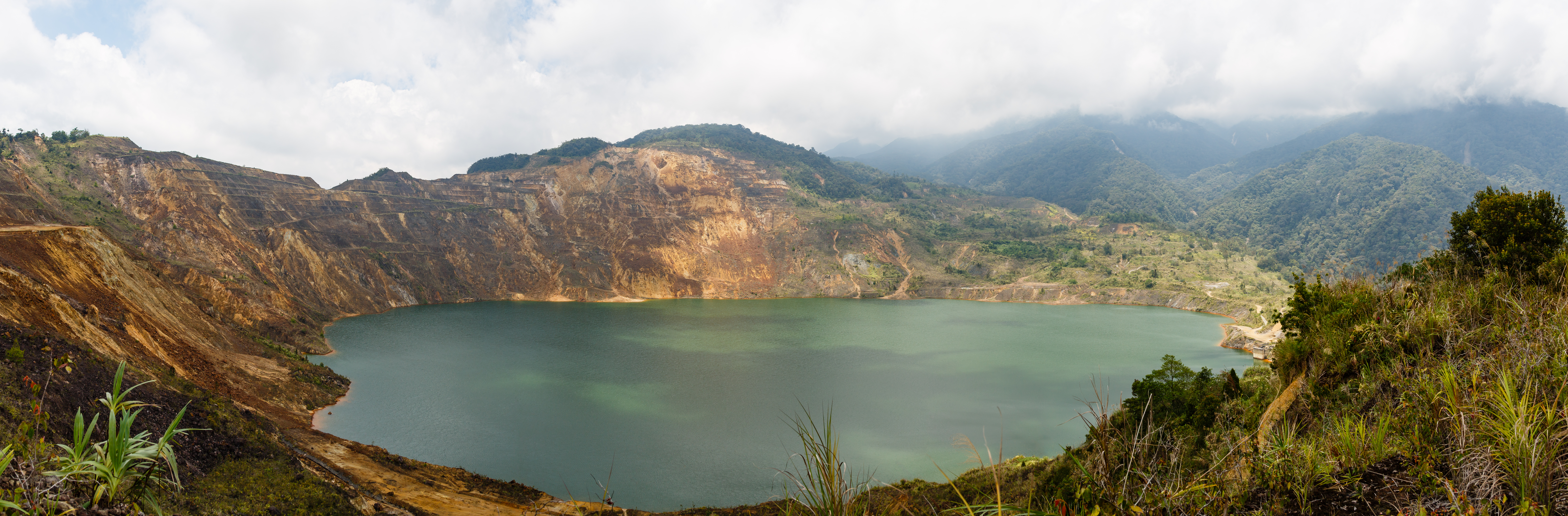
- Landscape of the abandoned mine.

- Location of the mine in Malaysia.
- Location: Ranau District, Sabah, Malaysia; 6°1′37.7″N 116°39′21.0″E
- Products: Copper, with some gold and silver
- Production: 2.1 million tonnes of concentrates containing 520,000 copper, 39 tonnes of gold and 255 tonnes of silver mined from 1975 until its closure in 1999
- Type: Open-pit mine
- Greatest depth: 500 metres
- Opened: 1975
- Closed: 1999
- Company: Mamut Copper Mining Sdn Bhd

Mamut Mine (Malay: Lombong Mamut) is an abandoned open-pit quarry mine located in the Ranau District of Sabah, Malaysia, where from 1975 to 1999, various minerals, primarily copper, including some gold and silver, were mined. The mine is known as Malaysia's only copper mine. It came to public attention due to the major environmental harm it caused.

== Geology ==
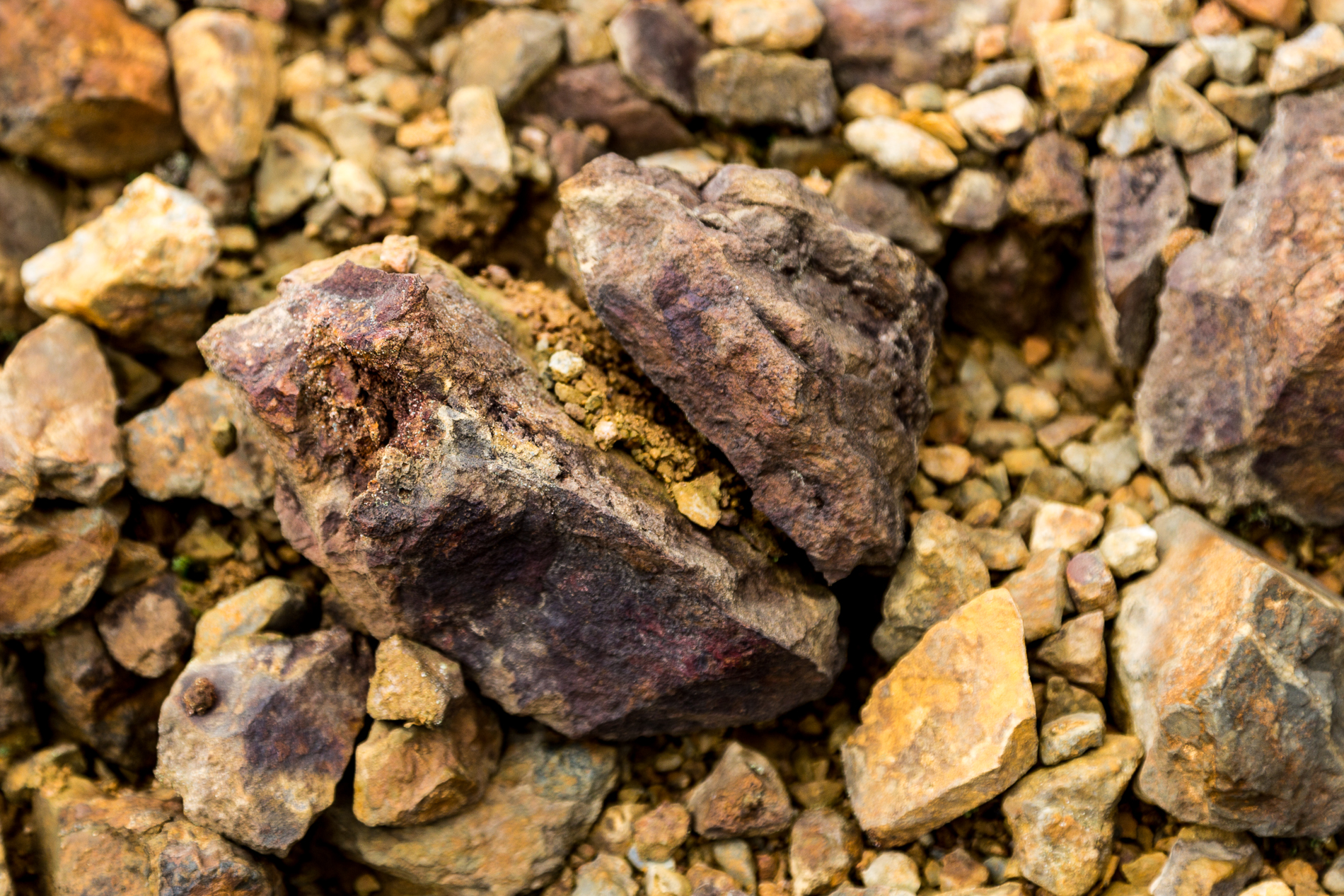
Typical rocks from the working area of the copper mine in Mamut.

The source rock for the mine is adamellite porphyry, and the plutons are emplaced hypabyssal into Palaeogene turbiditic rocks in the Trusmadi Formation and Early Cretaceous ophiolite. The average age of porphyry stocks is 9 mega-annum (Late Miocene) with total reserves of deposit of about 179 Mt Cu grade. The mine porphyry copper deposits are associated with tertiary granitoid intrusions with mineral reserves of 77 million tonnes of ore, an average grade of 0.608% copper and recoverable amounts of gold and silver.

== History ==
Established through a consortium between Japanese and Malaysian companies, the mine began its production in 1975 and produced a total of 21,613.8 tonnes (21,613,800 kg) of minerals valued at $11.5 million, which was exported overseas. Towards the end of 1991, the number of workers in the mine increased to 1,191 from only 100, with 99% of those employed being Malaysian. It is estimated that together with their families, the total number of people dependent on their livelihood in the mine is over 10,000. The first production of the copper mine also showed that Malaysia was rich in natural resources that contributed to the country's output with most copper, silver and gold produced in East Malaysia. Minerals gathered from the mine were trucked to Kota Belud District before being shipped to Japan for refining.

Since its closure and subsequent abandonment, water has filled the mine, which is toxic for consumption due to its highly acidic nature. In 2001, the government of Sabah through Chief Minister Chong Kah Kiat tried to attract the interest among investors to develop the abandoned mine area for tourism attraction which is ideal for resort development with the highland weather, interesting topography and scenic view of Mount Kinabalu despite no further deal are being realised. Further in 2016, Sabah Deputy Chief Minister Joseph Pairin Kitingan said the local authorities were looking at the possibility of treating the 20.6 million cubic metres of acidic water at the mine pit to overcome water shortage in Sabah caused by drought although this proposal later was considered by a local geologist as unfeasible and costly since even if the water could be treated with acid mine drainage (AMD) method to neutralise its acidity, other minerals and heavy metals are still present in the water that made it unfit for human consumption and need more cost to clean the water.

== See also ==
- Mining in Malaysia
