= Perak Stadium =

Stadium in Malaysia

Perak Stadium Stadium Perak
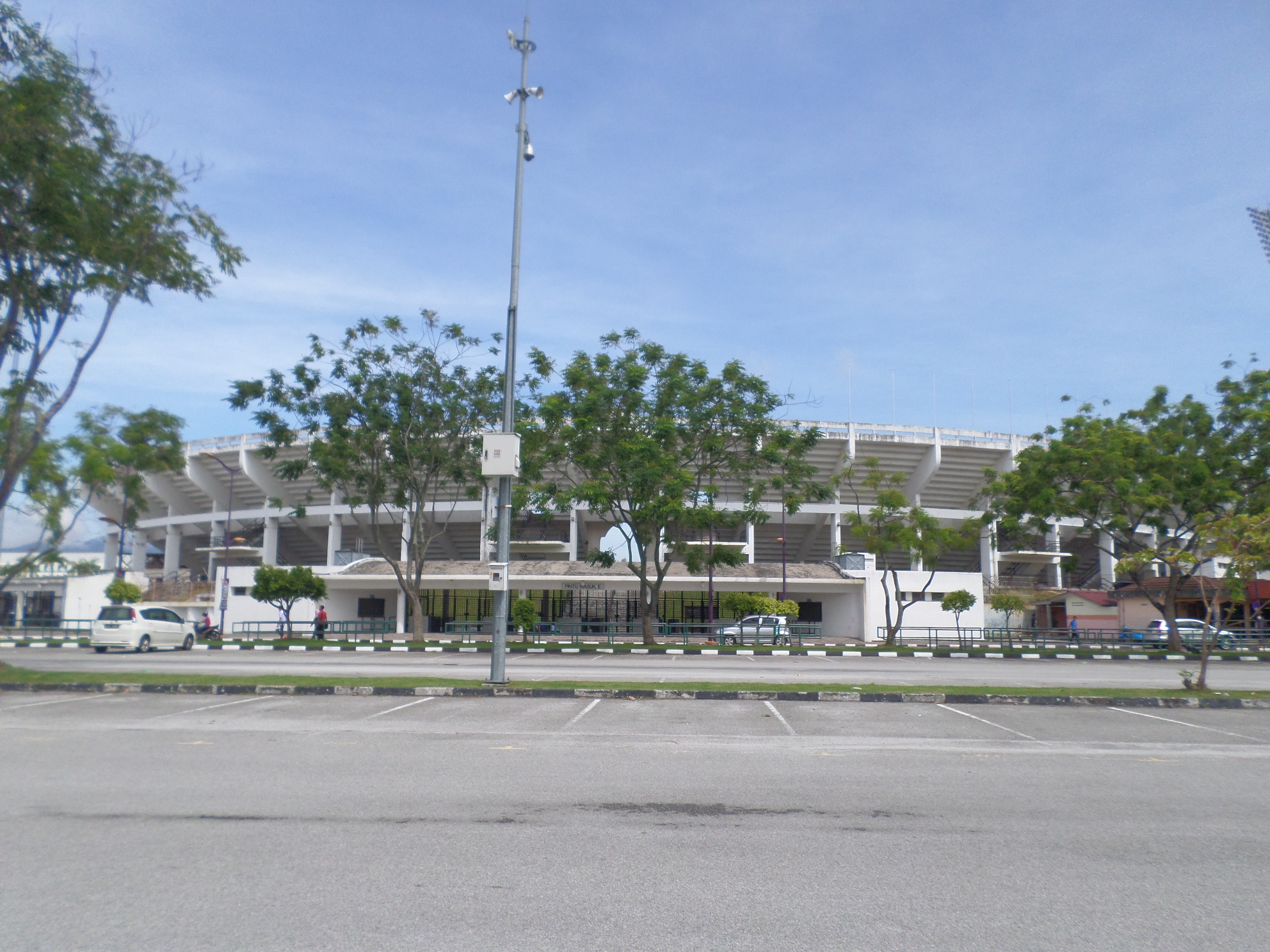
- Interactive map of Perak Stadium; Stadium Perak
- Full name: Stadium Perak
- Location: Ipoh
- Coordinates: 4°36′34″N 101°06′12″E
- Owner: Ipoh City Council
- Capacity: 42,500
- Surface: Bermuda grass

Construction
- Built: 1965
- Renovated: 1975, 1993, 2018, 2024–present

Tenants
- Perak F.C. Perak F.C. II; Perak FA Youth; Perak FA state football team

Perak Stadium (Malay: Stadium Perak) is a stadium used mostly for football, located in Kampung Simee, Ipoh, Kinta District, Perak, Malaysia. It is part of a large MBI Sports Complex, which houses sporting facilities such as Velodrome Rakyat, Indera Mulia Stadium and Sultan Azlan Shah Stadium. With a maximum capacity of 42,500 spectators, it is the largest stadium in Peninsular Malaysia's northern region and the fourth largest nationwide.

== Profile ==
Before the stadium was built, the site for the stadium was used as a prison from 1949 to 1959, known as Detention Camp to incarcerate communists during Malayan Emergency period (Darurat in Malay).

The construction of the stadium started in January 1964 and completed by June 1965, with a maximum capacity of 10,000. Two following renovations increased the stadium capacity – 1975 (18,000) and 1993 (30,000).

The stadium was upgraded in 1997. for the FIFA U-20 World Cup. It was renovated in 1999 at a cost of RM 1,949,000 by the Perak state government. It was put under the administration of the Ipoh City Council, which oversees the general upkeep of the stadium until this day.

Since the last refurbishment in 1997, the capacity of the stadium is 42,500 and it boasts a press box and a VIP-area which is normally used by the Sultan of Perak. The stadium features a FIFA standard football pitch and an IAAF-certified synthetic running track. The stadium also has monochromatic video matrix scoreboard.

The stadium has a notoriously problematic flood light system. Poor pitch conditions are also a norm at this stadium and coaches are known to have publicly voiced their discontent over this issue

The Perak Stadium underwent upgrades in preparation for the 2017 Malaysian Games, which included the replacement of running tracks, the installation of new spectator seats, and improved lighting. The project was estimated to cost between RM15 million and RM20 million.

In 2023, the Perak Stadium's floodlights were stolen twice.

=== 2024 Upgrade ===
In 2024, it was announced that the stadium would undergo repairs to upgrade the drainage system and the turf. The initial timeline for the project scheduled work to begin in November 2024, with an expected duration of four to five months. However, a subsequent announcement in October revised the estimated completion date to June 2025.

A further update in March 2025 indicated another delay, shifting the completion timeline to August 2025.

== Usage ==
Today, the stadium is not regularly used for events other than football. Events such as military band competitions and school sports days are held at the Perak Stadium sporadically.

The Perak FA, which plays its football in the Malaysian Super League, considers Perak Stadium to be its homeground and their matches are the only times when the stadium experiences capacity crowds.

It is a preferred venue for football final matches when the teams involved do not originate near the Klang Valley area such as the Malaysia FA Cup final matches for 1997 (Selangor FA vs. Penang FA) and 2003 (Negeri Sembilan FA vs. Perlis FA). Some parties have criticised the Football Association of Malaysia for failing to move the finals of 2006 Malaysian FA Cup (Pahang FA vs. Perlis FA) to this stadium, where attendance levels were likely to be higher than the one eventually experienced at Bukit Jalil.

The stadium also held numerous final matches or championship for FAM Cup, Piala Emas Raja-Raja, Agong Cup, Burnley Cup and Bardhan Cup.

== See also ==
- Sport in Malaysia
