= Darul Ridzuan Museum =

Museum in Kinta, Perak, Malaysia

- Muzium Darul Ridzuan
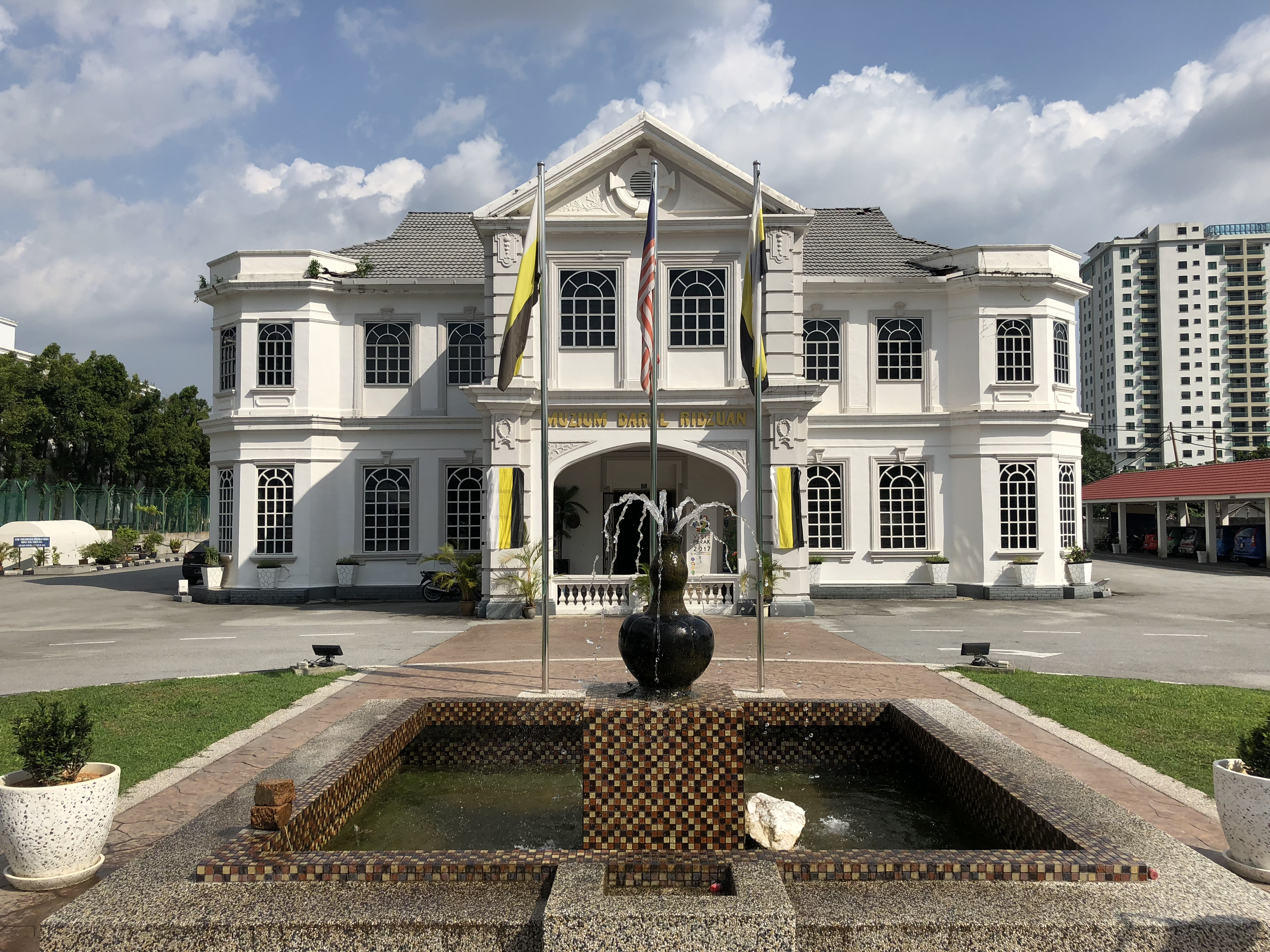
- Established: 1992
- Location: Ipoh, Perak, Malaysia
- Coordinates: 4°36′16.3″N 101°4′40.8″E
- Type: museum
- Owners: Perak State Museum Board, Government of Perak

The Darul Ridzuan Museum (Malay: Muzium Darul Ridzuan) is a museum in Ipoh, Kinta District, Perak, Malaysia.

== History ==
The museum building was originally constructed in 1926 as a house for a wealthy tin miner named Foo Choong Kit. In 1950, the house was sold to Perak Government in which it was then used to house the administrative center of the Department of Works It was then opened as a museum in 1992.

== Architecture ==
The museum building was constructed with British architectural style. It has two floors with eight rooms on the top floor and two rooms on the ground floor. Behind the main building there are another four rooms. It has a total floor area of 1.6 hectares.

== Exhibitions ==
The museum exhibits the history and development of the mining and agriculture sectors of Ipoh.

== See also ==
- List of museums in Malaysia
- List of tourist attractions in Perak
