= Taiping Lake Gardens =

Lake garden in Larut, Matang and Selama, Perak, Malaysia

Taiping Lake Gardens Taman Tasik Taiping
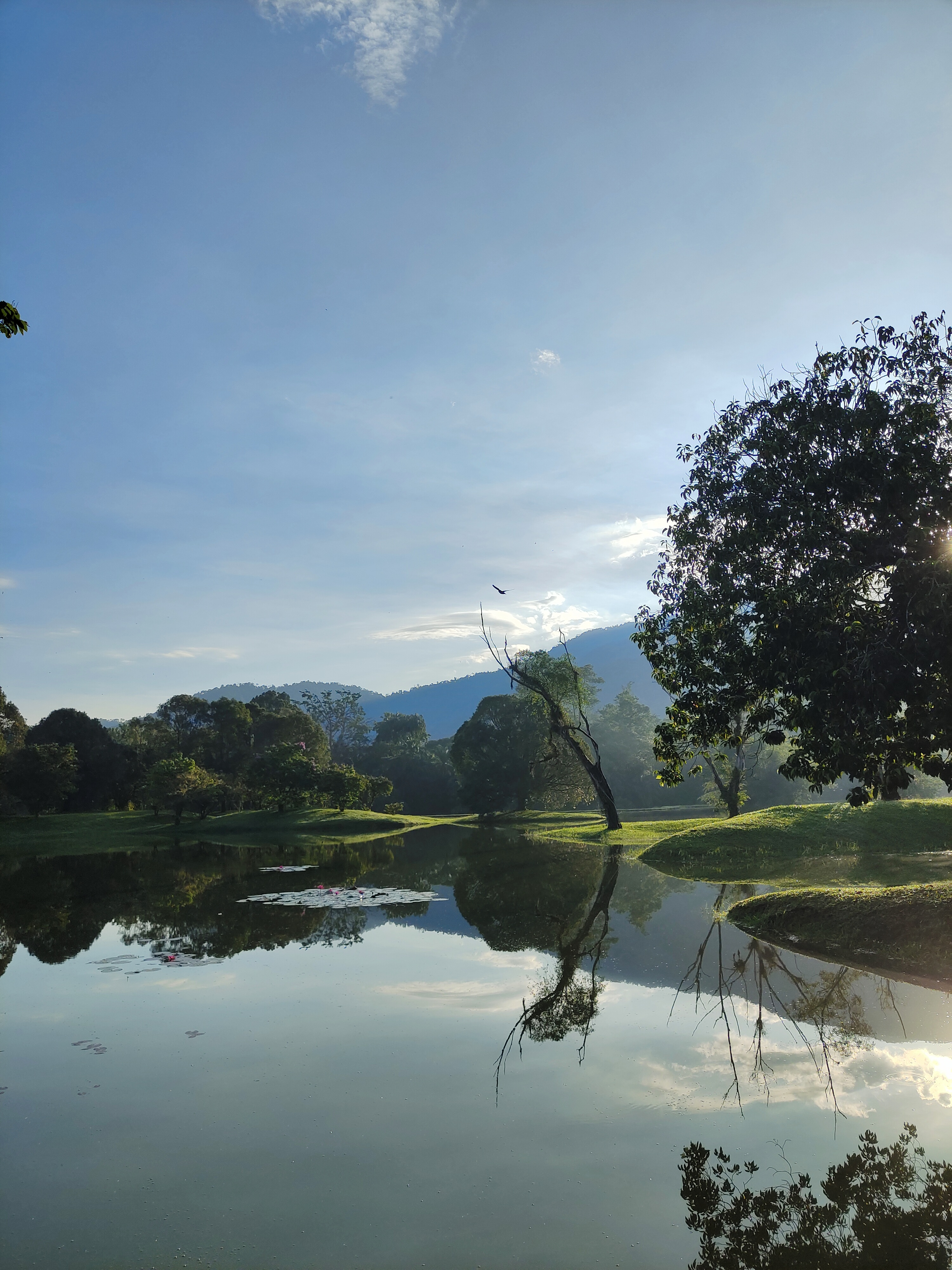
- Interactive map of Taiping Lake Gardens; Taman Tasik Taiping
- Type: Public gardens
- Location: Taiping, Perak, Malaysia
- Coordinates: 4°51′14″N 100°44′0″E
- Created: 1880
- Operator: Taiping Municipal Council
- Website: http://www.mptaiping.gov.my/

The Taiping Lake Gardens (Malay: Taman Tasik Taiping) is the first public garden established during the British rule in Malaysia. The garden is located near Bukit Larut, and is equidistant to the town centre and the Taiping Zoo.

== History ==
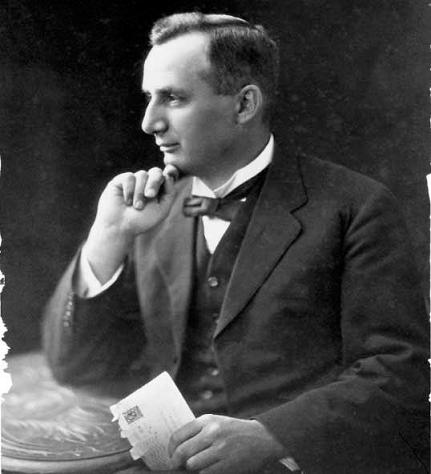
Town planner Charles Reade.

The Taiping Lake Gardens was originally a mining ground before it was established as a public garden in 1880. The idea of a public garden was the brainchild of Colonel Robert Sandilands Frowd Walker. The garden was developed by Charles Compton Reade (1880–1933), who was also responsible for planning the Kuala Lumpur garden town, together with Lady Swettenham.

The abandoned tin mine ground was donated by Chung Keng Quee as a recreation park for public use. In 1884 the gardens were planted with grasses, flowers, and trees; a part of the gardens was fenced, to keep bulls out.

The 64 hectares (160 acres) site was the first public garden in Malaya, and was cherished for its beauty; it has been well-maintained since its opening. There are ten scenic lakes and ponds, which highlight the gardens. Along Residency Road, near the gardens, were golden rain trees (Malay: Samanea saman) or hujan-hujan (pterocarpus indicus) planted along the pathway. In George L. Peet’s A Journal in the Federal Capital, when he visited Taiping in 1933 he said “I know of no more lovely sight in this country than the Taiping gardens when the rays of the early morning sun are shining obliquely through their clumps of bamboo, palms and isolated trees scattered on islands among the expanse of water. One receives in that glorious half hour an experience of light in foliage that is quite unobtainable in England”.

There are few private and government houses located near the gardens; among them are the Old Residency (home of the Secretary to the Resident), the Raja’s House at the junction of Birch Road and Residency Road and the army officers' residences on Batu Tugoh Road. The gardens were so striking that they attracted many travelers to write of their beauty:

The streets are shaded by rows of the angsena tree, which at irregular intervals bursts forth into a riot of blossoms, even more yellow than those of the laburnum. These it rains down in golden snow upon the streets, providing a carpet fit for a Sultan, for yellow is the royal colour in the East. With its golden snow, the angsena spreads abroad an almost overpowering scent, even more sweet than the smell of the pinang blossom. Most of the towns in Malaya have planted this Pterocarpus indicus as shade tree, but in Taiping it has grown to a greater height than elsewhere.

— Cuthbert Woodville Harrison, An Illustrated Guide to the Federated Malay States (1911)

== Lakes and ponds ==
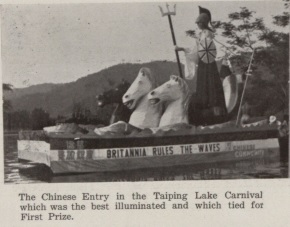
A Chinese entry of a decorated boat in the Taiping Lake Carnival which was the best illuminated and which tied for First Prize, 1937.

- Alamanda Pond
- Island Pond
- Jungle Lake
- Oblong Pond
- Pavilion Pond
- South Lake
- Swan Lake
- West Lake

== Accessibility ==
=== Air ===
Penang International Airport is about a 90-minute drive from Taiping. Kuala Lumpur International Airport is about a three-hour drive south via the North-South Expressway. Ipoh Airport is about 60-minute drive from Taiping.

=== Road ===
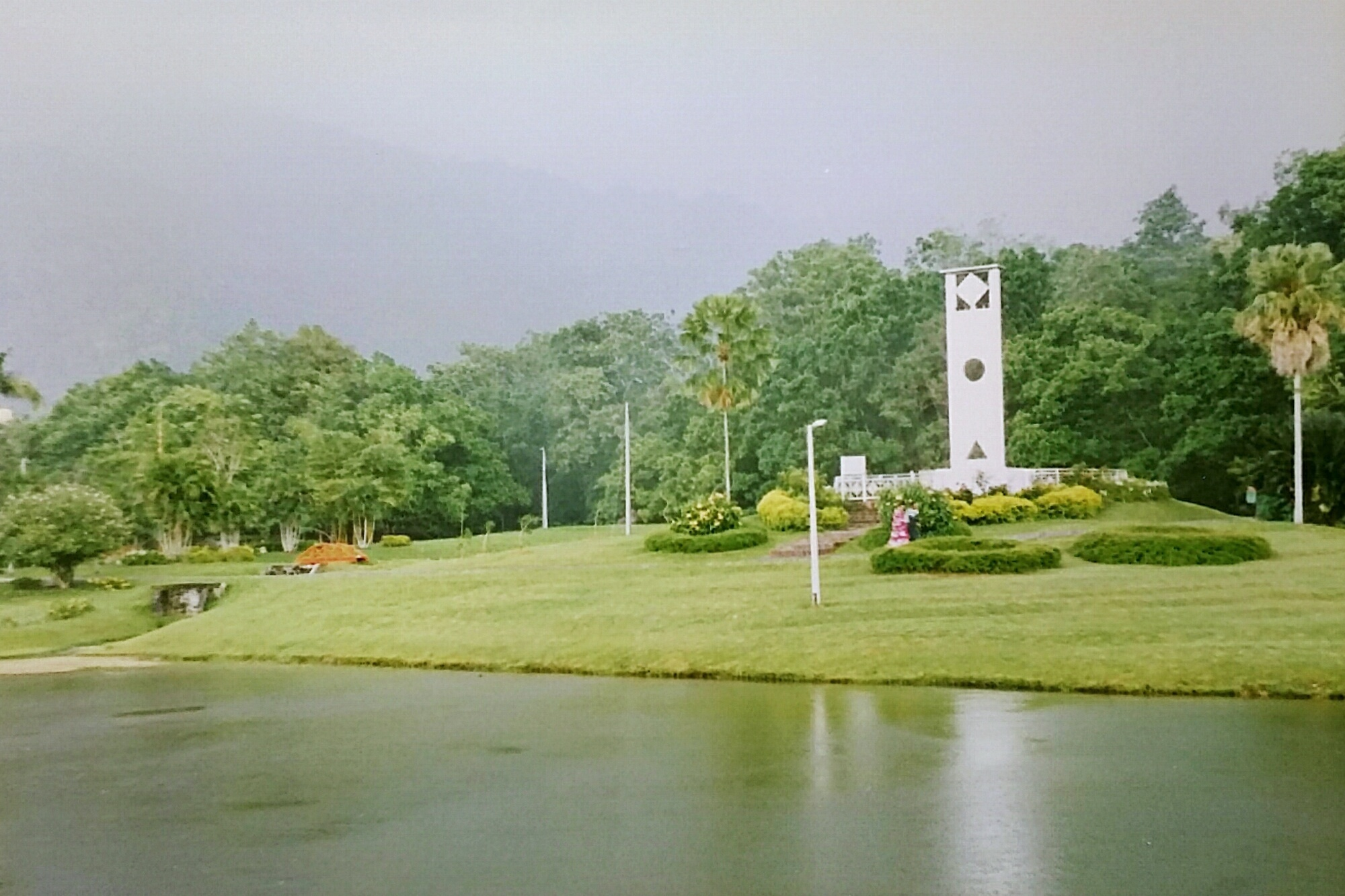
Taiping Lake Gardens in 1971.

Taiping is easily accessible from the PLUS North-South Expressway. From Penang (90 km away) Kamunting is the nearest exit, whilst Changkat Jering is the most convenient exit from the motorway if you are traveling north from Ipoh (70 km). Taiping is well-connected to the rest of Peninsular Malaysia by express buses, which arrive at and depart from the long-distance bus station at Kamunting (6 km from the town centre) and Simpang (7 km from the town centre). Buses also travel direct from Taiping to Singapore and Hat Yai. Southbound buses depart from Kamunting and call along Simpang (Medan Simpang) to pick up passengers from Simpang before heading to the highway via the Changkat Jering interchange. Bus tickets are available from counters located at Medan Kamunting and Medan Simpang.

=== Rail ===
Keretapi Tanah Melayu (formerly known as the Malayan Railway) operates a number of daily services along the main north-south line which stops at Taiping station. One service, the Ekspres Langkawi, connects Taiping with Hat Yai.

== Attractions ==
- Lakes and ponds - There are about 10 man-made lakes and ponds distributed throughout the gardens.
- Bukit Larut (formerly Maxwell Hill) - A hill station with an altitude of about 1000m; ideal for jungle-trekking and camping. Accessible by four-wheel drive; accommodation available on the hilltop. No reservations; visitors must go early (at 8 am) to buy tickets for the day. Visitors must specify what time they want to go up and what time to come down. Cost is RM4.00 (US$1) per person, round trip. One option is to hike up, which takes an average of 2-3/4 hours (one way); the jeep journey takes 25 minutes.
- Tulip garden - Located at Bukit Larut, it is the first tulip farm established in Malaysia. Admission to the tulip farm is RM1 (US$0.25) outside tulip season and RM2 (US$0.50) during the season.
- Taiping Zoo and Night Safari Taiping - First zoo to be established in Malaysia; popular on weekends with day-trippers from out of town
  - Day zoo: adults RM16, child (3–12 years) RM8 (US$2); discounts available for school groups, senior citizens (age 55+) and tourist groups (20 or more); open 08:30-18:00, feeding times 10 am and noon
  - Night safari: adults RM20, child (3–12 years) RM10 (US$2.50); discounts available for senior citizens (60+) and tourist groups (20+); open 20:00-23:00 (closes at midnight on Saturdays and the eve of public holidays)

== See also ==
- List of tourist attractions in Perak
- Mining in Malaysia
