= Birch Memorial Clock Tower =

Clock tower in Kinta, Perak, Malaysia

- Menara Jam Peringatan Birch
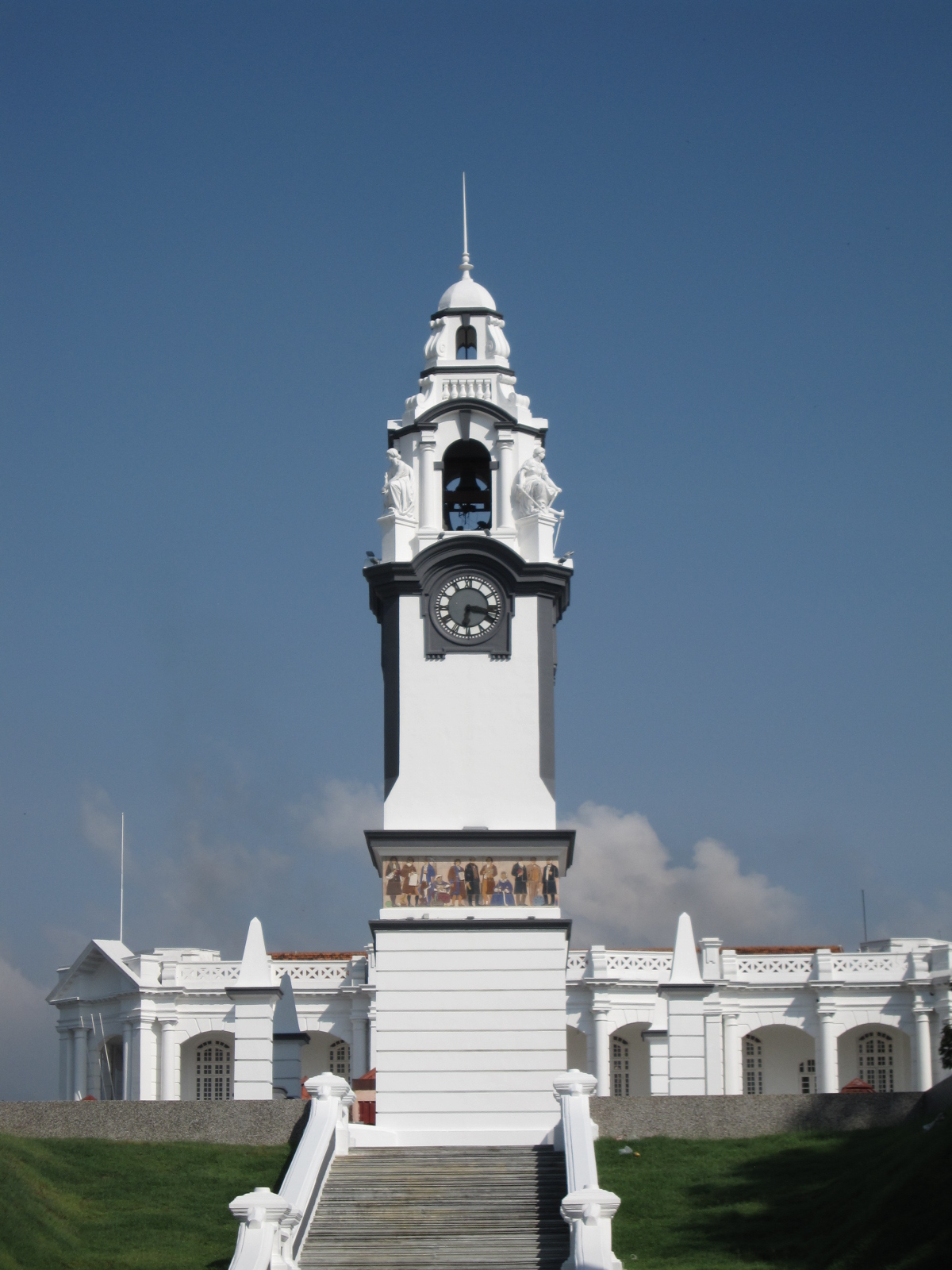
- Interactive map of the Birch Memorial Clock Tower area

General information
- Type: Clock tower
- Location: Ipoh, Kinta, Perak, Malaysia
- Coordinates: 4°35′48.6″N 101°04′34.0″E
- Opened: 1909

The Birch Memorial Clock Tower (Malay: Menara Jam Peringatan Birch) is a clock tower in Ipoh, Kinta District, Perak, Malaysia.

== History ==
The clock tower was constructed to commemorate James W. W. Birch, the first British Resident of the state of Perak and unveiled on 8 December 1909 at a cost of $25,000.

== Architecture ==
The clock tower is located in a square and originally held a bronze, portrait bust of J. W. W. Birch in a niche, since removed. Four panels illustrate the growth of civilization designed by Messrs. Doulton and Co. of London. It has a mother bell and four smaller bells which used to strike the chimes supplied by Messrs. Gillet and Johnson, Croydon. Above the clock are four statues at each corner representing the cardinal virtues: prudence, justice, fortitude and temperance.

== The growth of civilization ==
There are four panels each one of the depicting the exponents of the different stages of civilization:

Panel A (North)

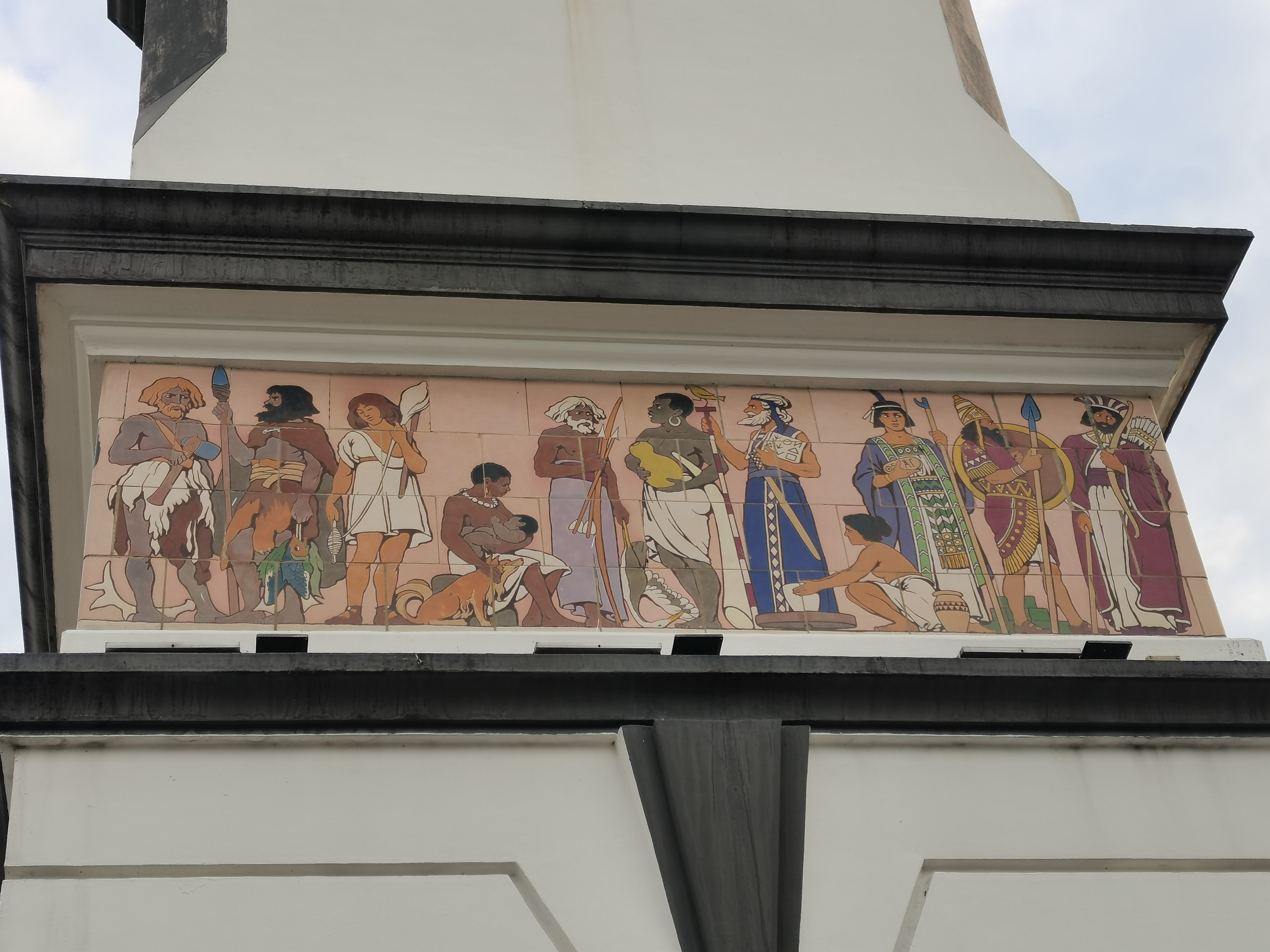
Panel A

The Stone Age:

- A hunter
- A fisherman
- A woman spinning

The Iron Age:

- A man and a woman

The Early Eastern Peoples:

- A Nubian with gold and ivory
- A Chaldean astrologer
- A woman making pottery
- An Egyptian
- An Assyrian
- A Persian

Panel B (West)

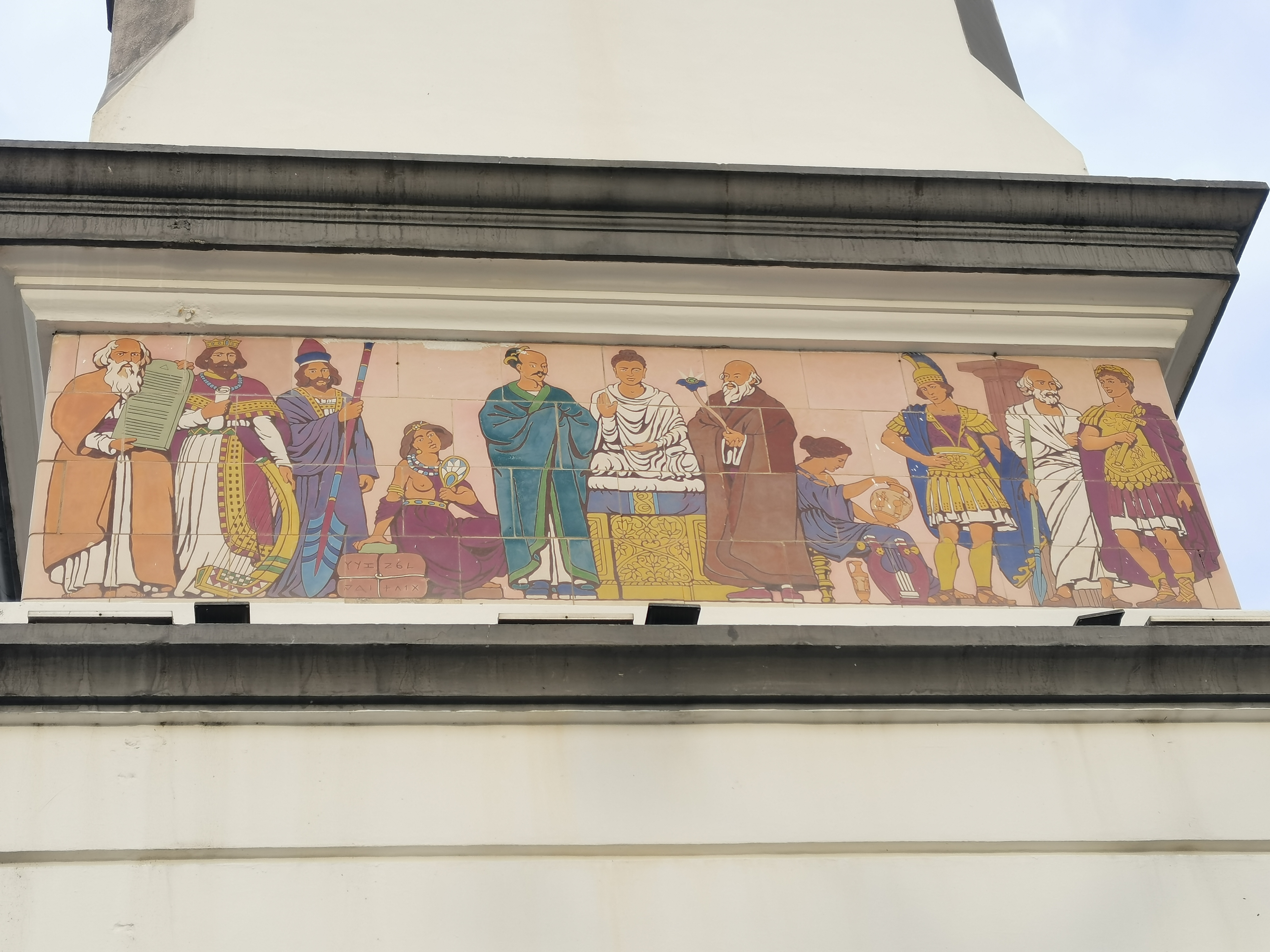
Panel B

The Eastern Mediterranean:

- Moses
- David
- A Phoenician
- A woman representing the Aegean civilization

The Far East:

- Confucius
- Buddha
- Lao Tzu

Greece and Rome:

- A woman representing Greek Art
- Alexander the Great
- Plato
- Augustus

Panel C (South)

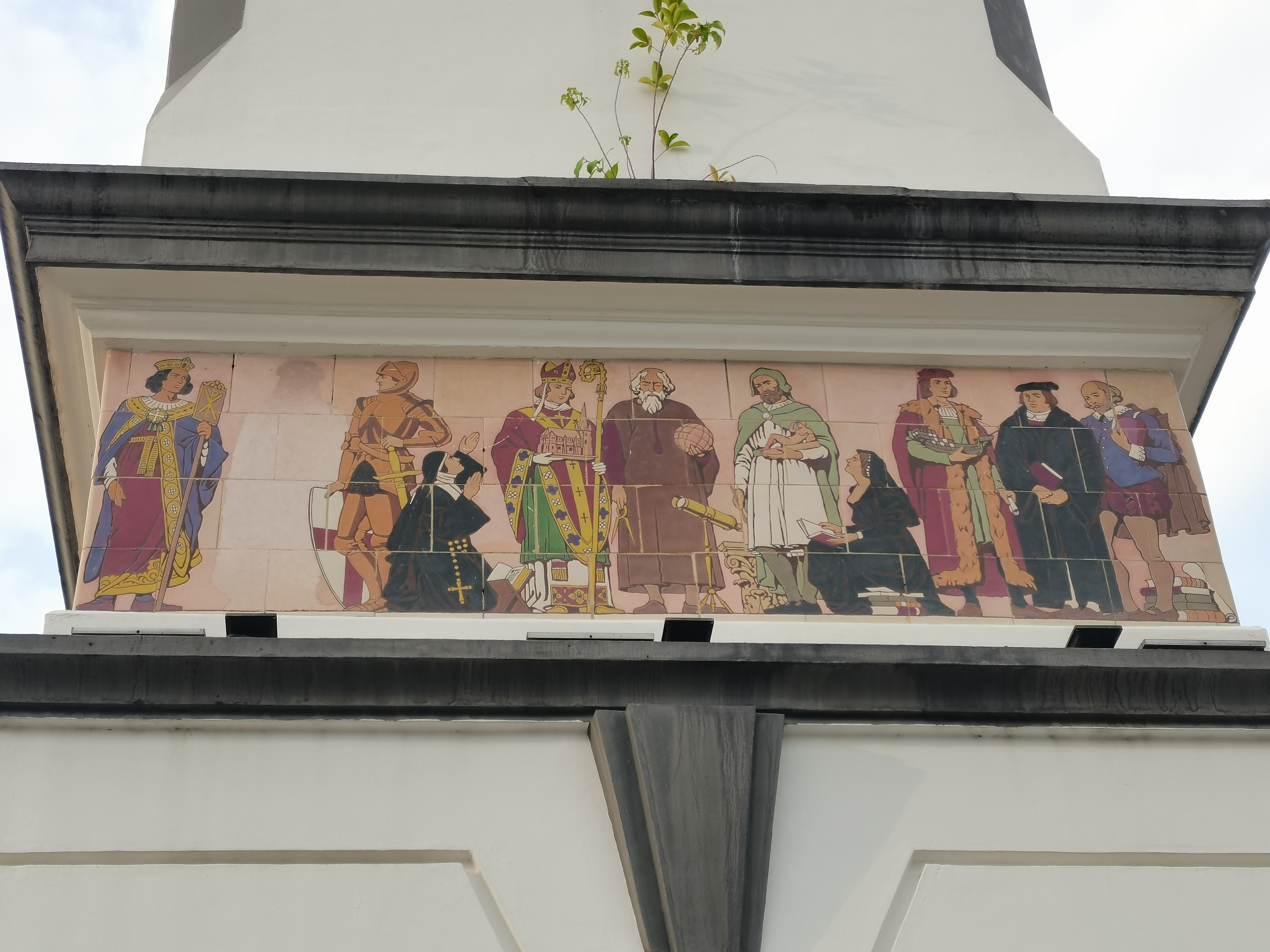
Panel C

The Byzantine Empire:

- Constantine the Great

Islam:

- Muhammad (removed on 15 July 1958 because Islam prohibits visual depictions of the Prophet Mohammed)

The Age of Chivalry:

- A Crusader

The Age of Faith:

- Saint Clare of Assisi

Gothic Art:

- Saint Thomas Aquinas

The Renaissance:

- Galileo Galilei, Michelangelo, Vittoria Colonna, Columbus

The Reformation:

- Martin Luther

The Elizabethan Age:

- William Shakespeare

Panel D (East)

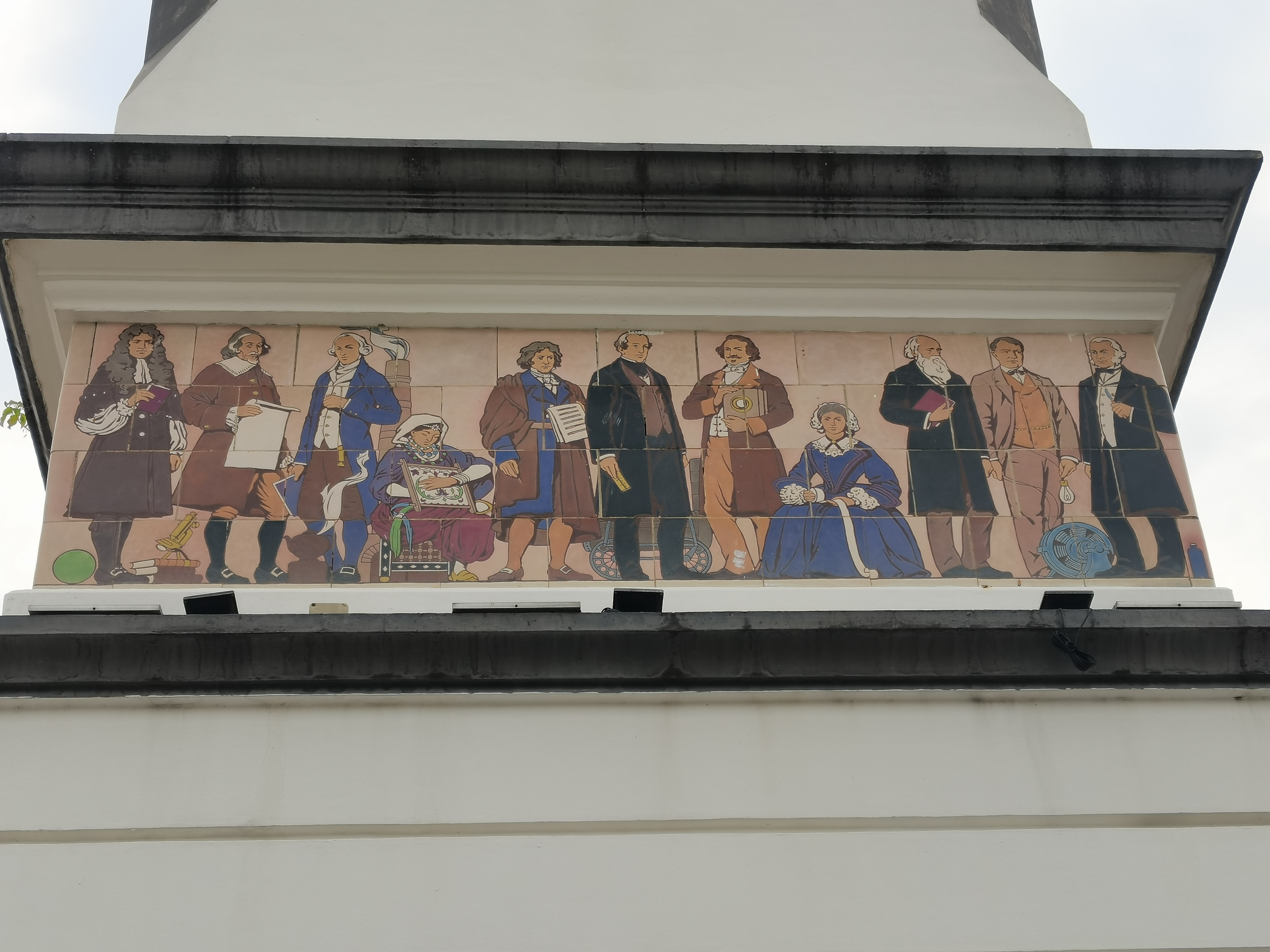
Panel D

Modern Science, Art and Social Services:

- Isaac Newton
- William Harvey
- James Watt
- An unnamed embroiderer
- Beethoven
- Robert Stephenson
- Louis Daguerre
- Florence Nightingale
- Charles Darwin
- Thomas Alva Edison
- Joseph Lister

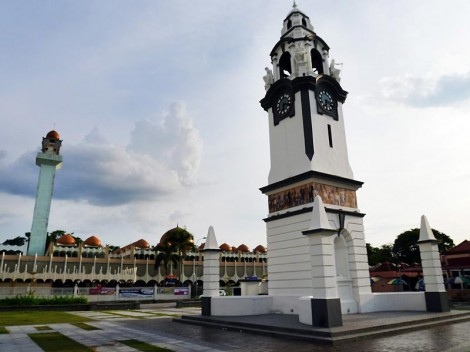
Birch Memorial Clock Tower

== See also ==
- List of tourist attractions in Perak
