= Gaharu Tea Valley =

Tea plantation in Kampar, Perak, Malaysia

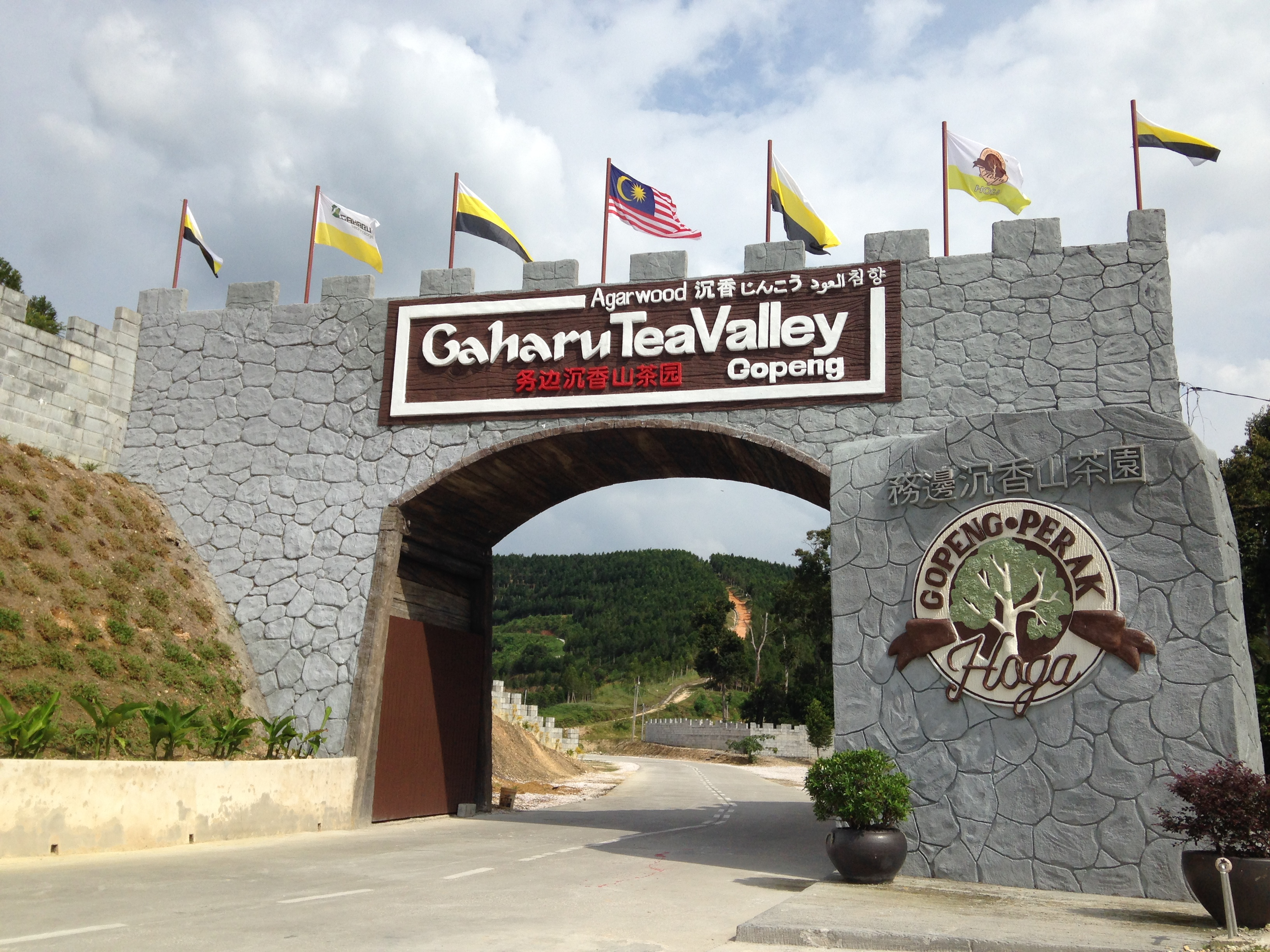
- Town/City: Gopeng, Perak, Malaysia
- Coordinates: 4°27′30.0″N 101°11′27.4″E
- Area: 120 ha (300 acres)
- Produces: tea

The Gaharu Tea Valley (Chinese: 務邊沉香山茶園) is an agro-tourism tea plantation in Gopeng, Kampar District, Perak, Malaysia.

== History ==
The tea valley started to welcome visitors since 2012.

== Geography ==
The plantation has over 200,000 trees of a special hybrid Aquilaria spp species which is critically endangered in the wild which spreads over an area of 120 hectares. Gaharu is the local Malay name for this tree better known as Agarwood, Aloes or Eagleswood to the world.

== See also ==
- List of tourist attractions in Perak
- Agriculture in Malaysia
