= Petroleum Museum (Malaysia) =

Museum in Miri, Sarawak

- Muzium Petroleum
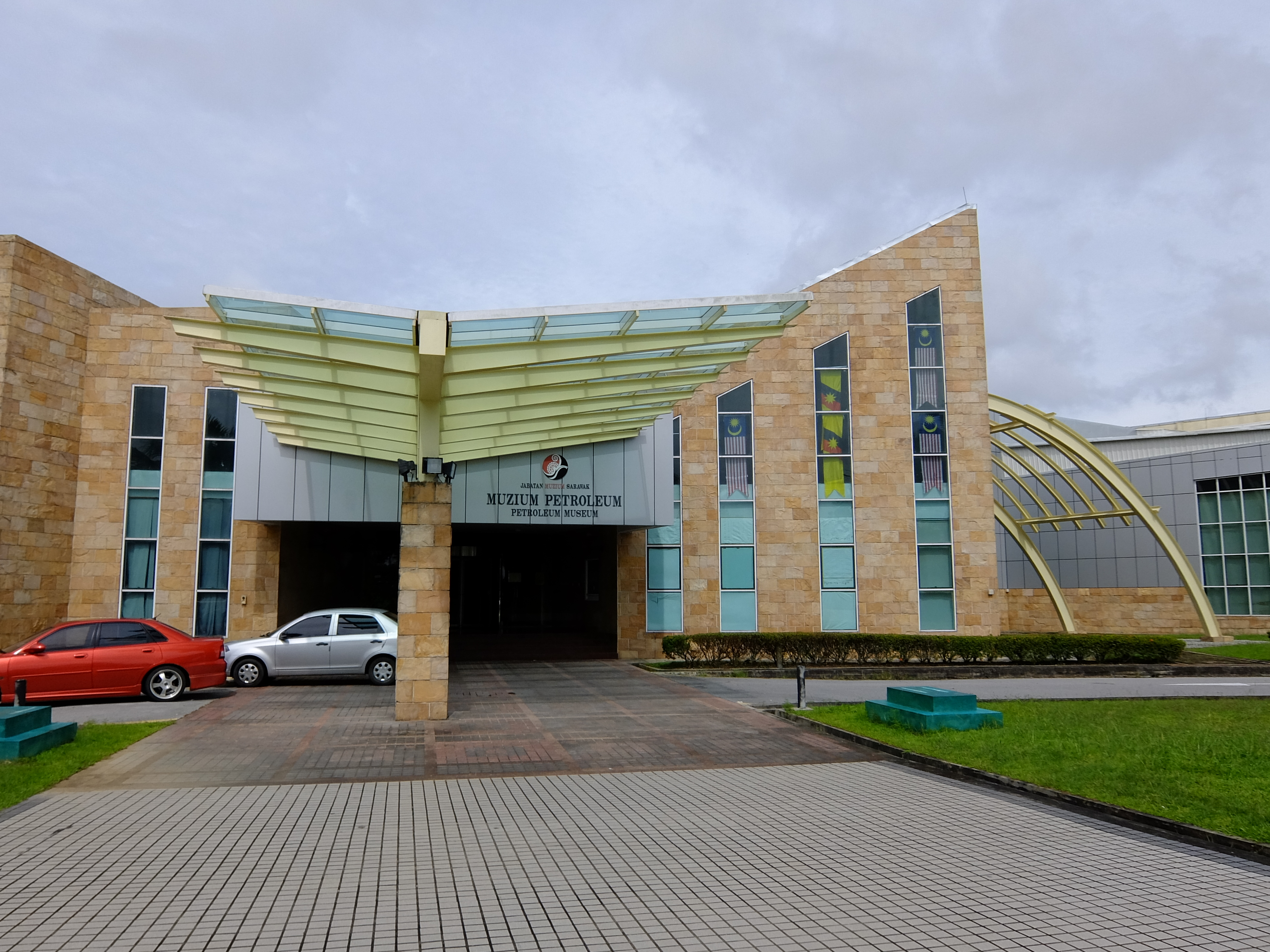
- Established: 20 May 2005
- Location: Miri, Sarawak, Malaysia
- Coordinates: 4°23′16″N 113°59′54″E
- Type: museum

The Petroleum Museum (Malay: Muzium Petroleum) is a museum in Canada Hill, Miri, Sarawak, Malaysia.

== History ==
The area where the museum is located was the first oil exploration site in Miri which used the Grand Oil Lady drilling rig. It produced oil starting from 22 December 1910 to 1972. One year after its retirement on 1 October 1973, Sarawak Shell Bhd handed over the property to the Sarawak State Government in a simple ceremony. Four months after the handover ceremony, a bush fire occurred on the rig but was later quickly extinguished.

Now the area no longer produces oil and has been declared as a protected historical site by the Sarawak State Government. The museum was officially opened to the public on 20 May 2005 after it was financed by Shell Malaysia and Petronas.

== Exhibition ==
The museum showcases various exhibits relating to the history of the petroleum industry in Malaysia. Inside the museum, there is an earthquake simulator, oil rig models and more. Outside the museum building is the Grand Old Lady oil rig. The former oil rig stands at 30 meters tall.

== See also ==
- List of museums in Malaysia
- Mining in Malaysia
