= Sitiawan Settlement Museum =

Museum in Manjung, Perak, Malaysia

- Established: 7 September 2003
- Location: Sitiawan, Perak, Malaysia
- Coordinates: 4°11′46.2″N 100°42′1.3″E
- Type: museum

The Sitiawan Settlement Museum is a museum in Koh Village, Sitiawan, Manjung District, Perak, Malaysia.

== History ==
The museum building was constructed in 1935 as the house for Pioneer Methodist Church pastors. On 7 September 2003, the house was converted into a museum.

== Architecture ==
The museum is housed in a two-story building.

== Exhibitions ==
The museum exhibits various antique artifacts from the early days of the church. It houses more than 500 items of records, photos and historical documents on the early works by the Christians coming from Fuzhou, China.

== See also ==
- List of museums in Malaysia
- List of tourist attractions in Perak
