= Markets of Taiping, Perak =

Market in Taiping, Malaysia

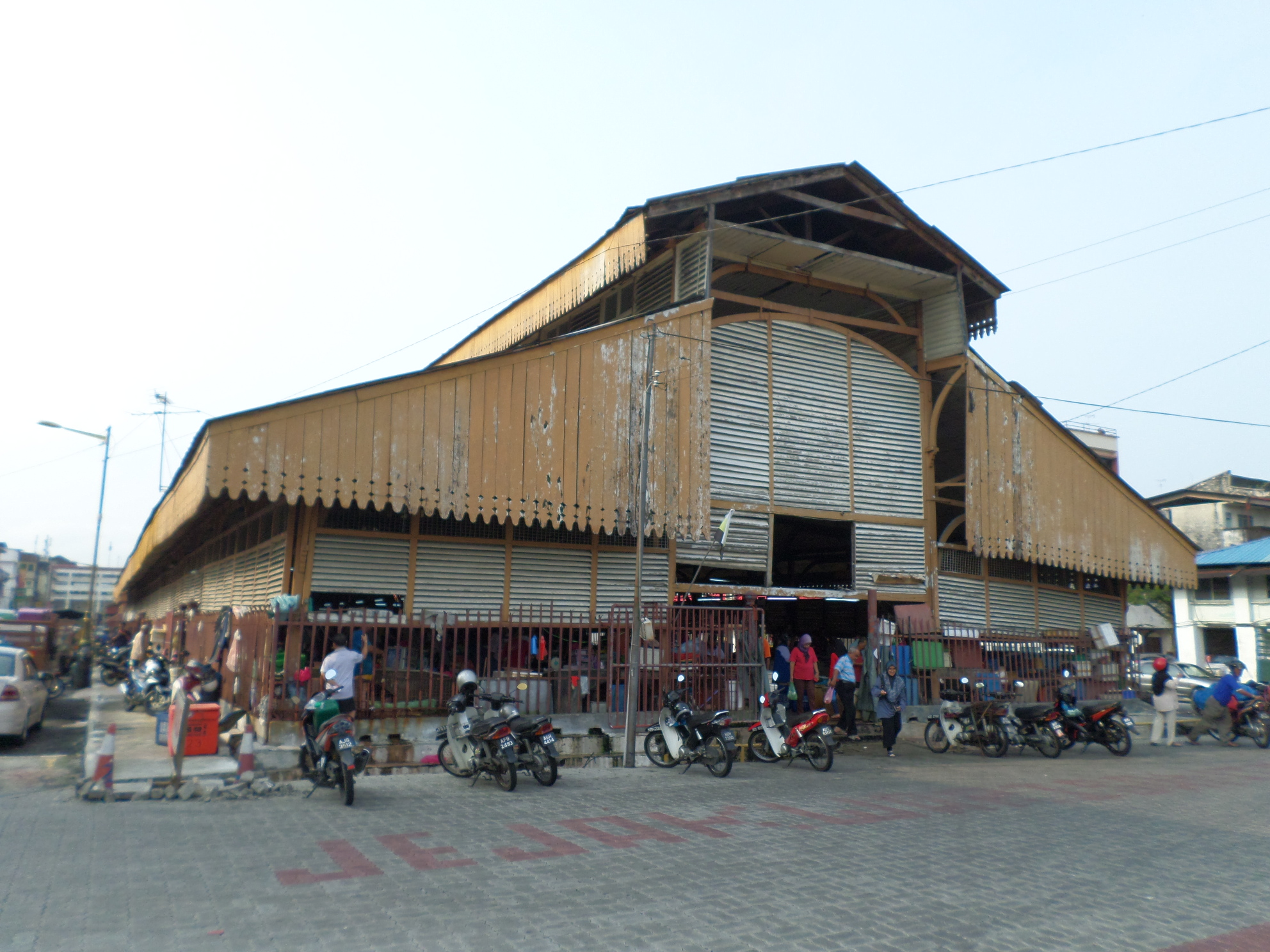
Taiping Wet Market

The first market built in Taiping was in 1884 and 1885. Due to the rapid growth of population in the town, there were more markets that mushroomed around the town to provide basic facilities to the folks. Below are the major markets that were constructed in 1884 until the late 1960s.

== History ==
=== The Old Markets ===
Located at the commercial town center at the Market Square, there are two markets that built separately and separated by the Kota Road. The Old Market was built in 1884 and the New Market in 1885. Both buildings stood 220 feet in length and 60 feet in width. The buildings were built with timber pillars, concrete slab and iron roof. There was an iron fountain donated by Mr Ng Boo Bee that originally stood in front of the market, many years later it was removed and replaced with a simple concrete clock tower. These markets served two different functions, one as a dry market and the other as a wet market. During the heyday, these markets were stocked with fresh vegetables, fish and meats, almost everything was available from here. The price for all goods was controlled by the government according to a report made by Sir Frank Swettenham when he served as the Acting Resident of Perak in 1884 until 1886. Sir Frank Swettenham also acted as the man who responsible for the establishment of the markets, he suggested to the then British Resident of Perak, Sir Hugh Low that a market was needed as the population growth of the town was drastic. Eventually the proposal was granted, in Sir Hugh Low’s journal was written that, "the town has a good model for others, with a well maintained market for the public use". In 2023 the Local Government Development Minister, Ngo Kor Ming, announced that funds would be allocated for the restoration of the market which had suffered 'severe damage to the wooden structure', and that it would be designated as Malaysia's first national heritage market.

=== Pokok Assam Market ===
The Pokok Assam Market is located at the New Village (Kampong Bahru) of Pokok Assam. This concrete structure market was built in 1956. This market was built to accommodate the non-Malay communities only.

=== Simpang Market ===
This concrete structure market was constructed in 1965.

== See also ==
- History of marketing
- Market place
- Pasar malam
- Pasar pagi
- Retail
