= Geological Museum (Malaysia) =

Museum in Kinta, Perak, Malaysia

- Muzium Geologi
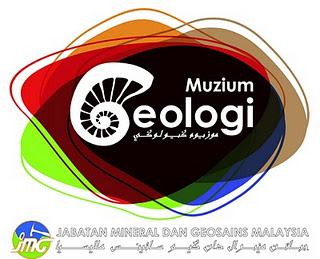

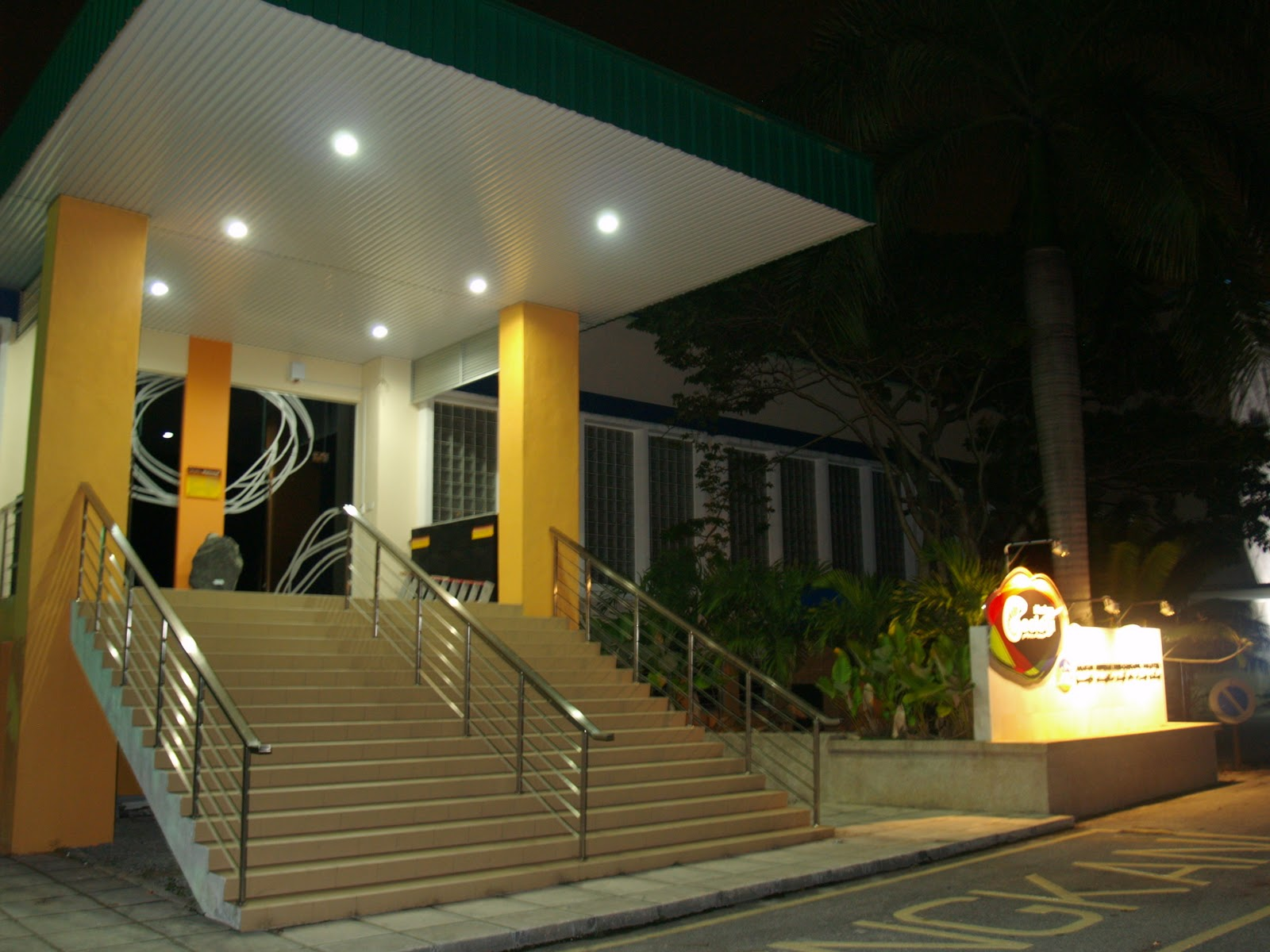
- Established: 1957
- Location: Ipoh, Perak, Malaysia
- Coordinates: 4°35′48.5″N 101°07′11.5″E
- Type: museum
- Owner: Minerals and Geoscience Department Malaysia

The Geological Museum (Malay: Muzium Geologi) is a museum in Ipoh, Kinta District, Perak, Malaysia.

== History ==
The construction of the museum started in July 1955 when the groundbreaking ceremony was officiated by the Crown Prince of Perak, Idris Shah II. The museum was finished and opened in 1957. The museum was extensively renovated and upgraded to increase the exhibition space and collections under the Ninth Malaysia Plan.

== Architecture ==
The museum occupies an area of 343 m^{2}. The building forms an integral part of the Minerals and Geoscience Department Complex of Ipoh.

== Exhibitions ==
The museum is divided into seven zones, ranging from the history of the museum and department, history of earth, dinosaur, minerals, mining activities, mineral exploration, geological hazards and more. It displays more than 600 types of minerals and various stones.

== See also ==
- List of museums in Malaysia
- List of tourist attractions in Perak
- Geography of Malaysia
