= Arulmigu Maha Muthu Mariamman Thevasthanam =

Hindu temple in Perak, Malaysia

- ஸ்ரீ முத்துமாரியம்மன் கோவில் 马里安曼兴都庙; Mǎ lǐ Àn Màn xīng dū miào
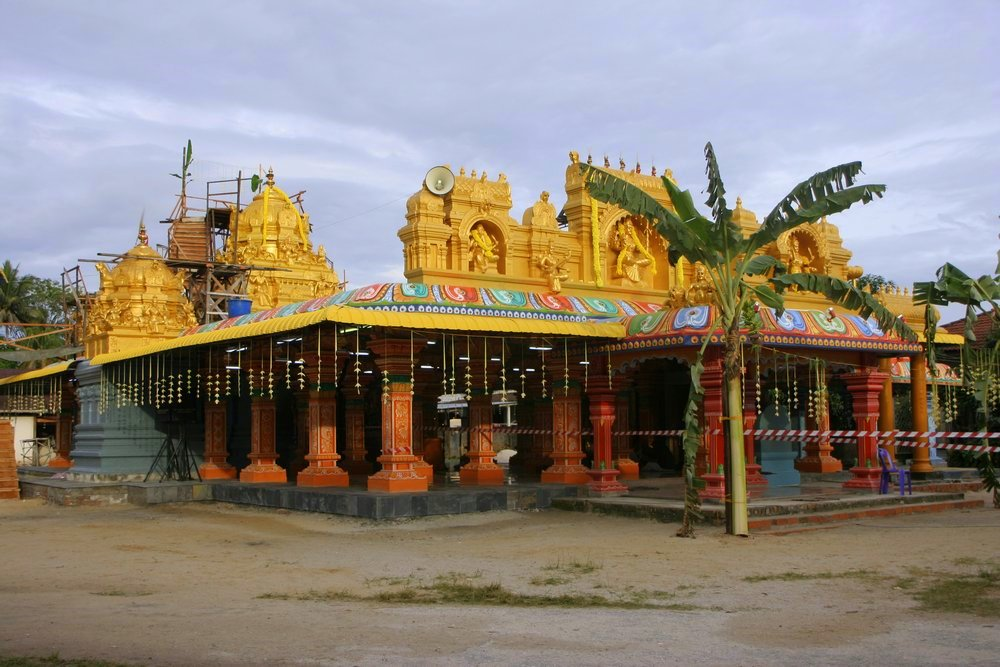

- Location in Malaysia

Religion
- Affiliation: Hinduism
- District: Kampar
- Deity: Mariamman

Location
- Location: Gopeng
- State: Perak
- Country: Malaysia
- Coordinates: 4°27′41.42″N 101°9′23.82″E

Architecture
- Type: Dravidian architecture
- Completed: 1962

Arulmigu Maha Muthu Mariamman Thevasthanam is a Hindu temple in Kopisan Baru, Gopeng, Kampar District, Perak, Malaysia.

== Gallery ==
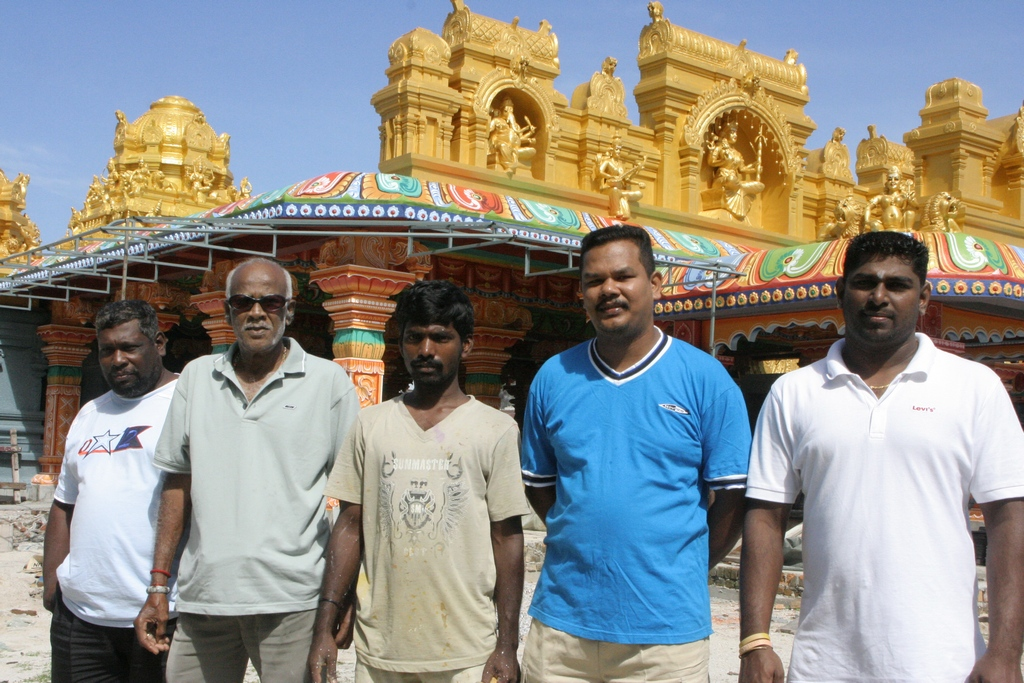
Some of the Temple Committee Members (Nov 2010)

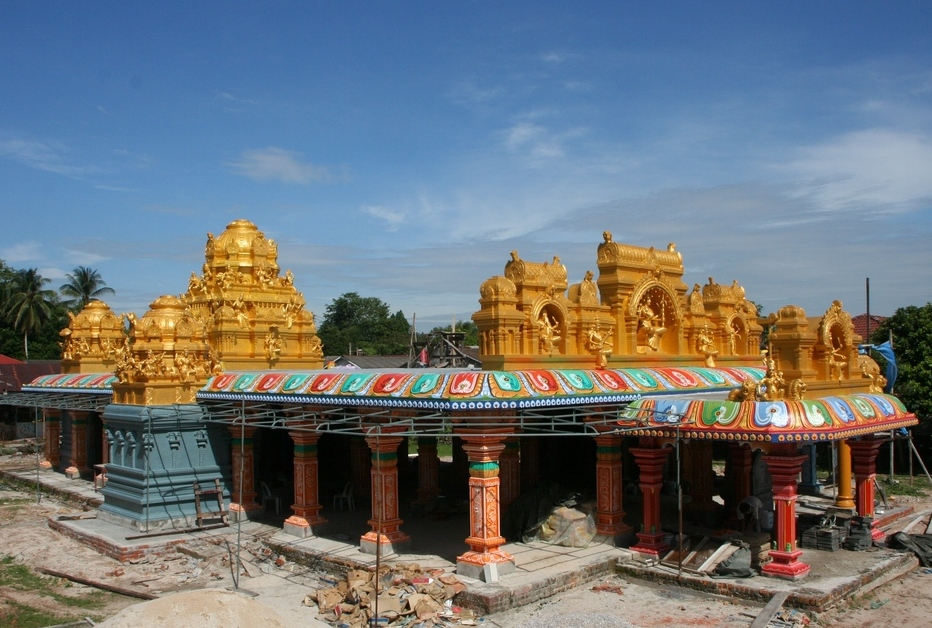
Temple as of November 2010

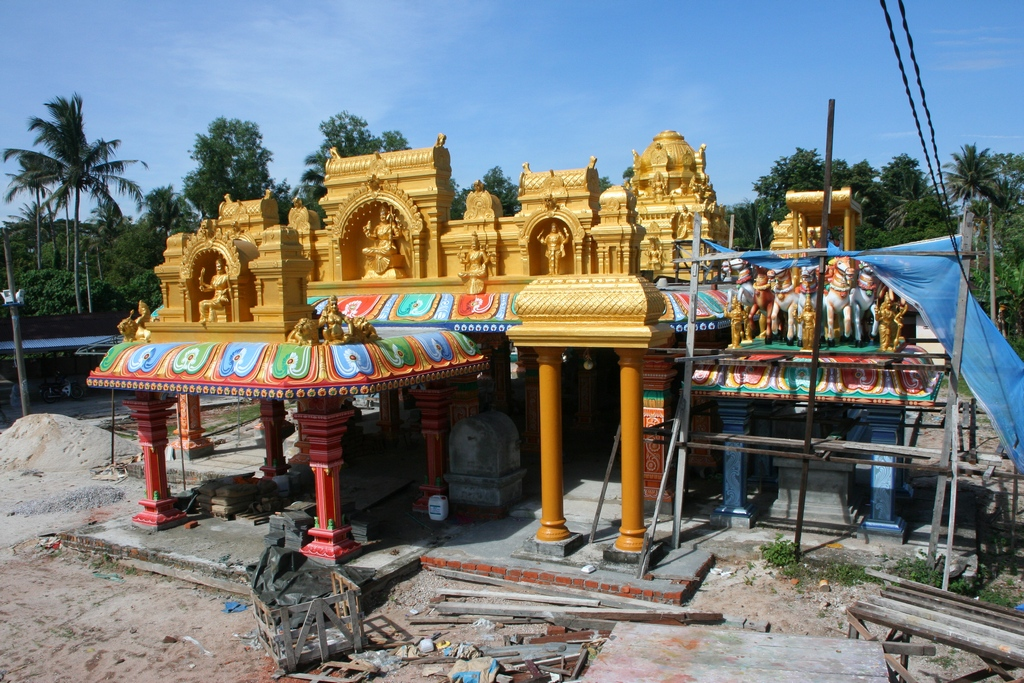
Temple as of November 2010

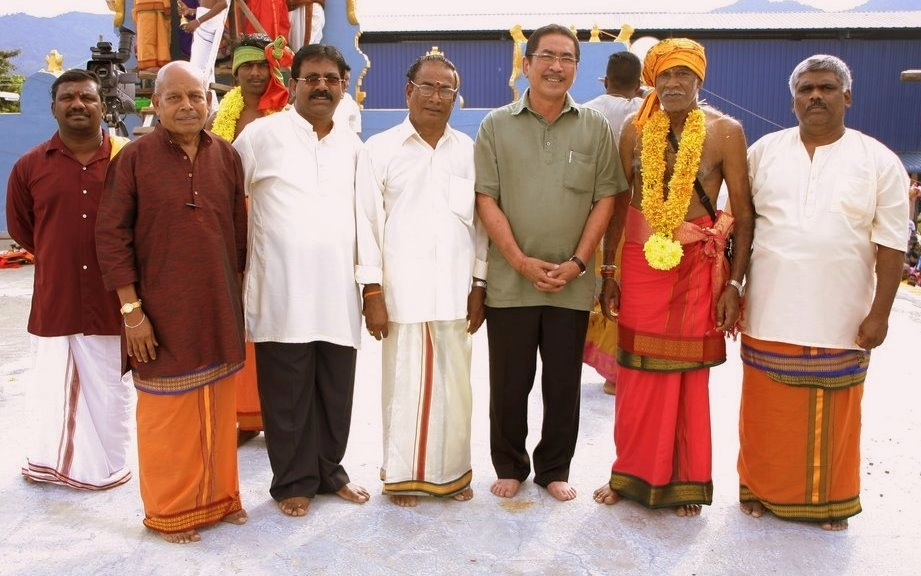
Part of the committee members and dignitaries (12th Dec 2010)

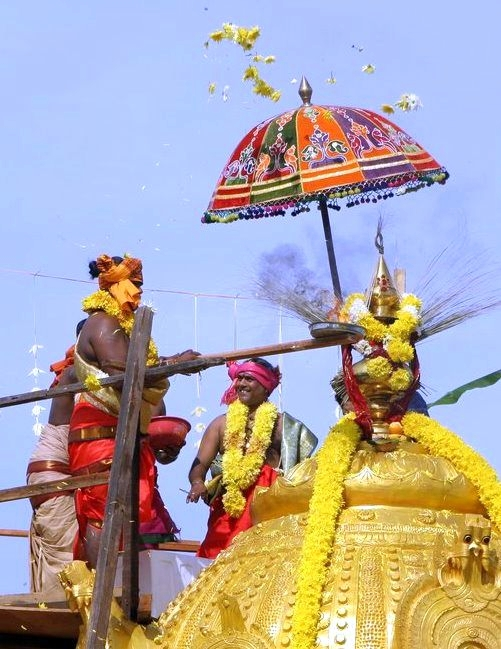
Kumbanishega ceremony (12 December 2010)

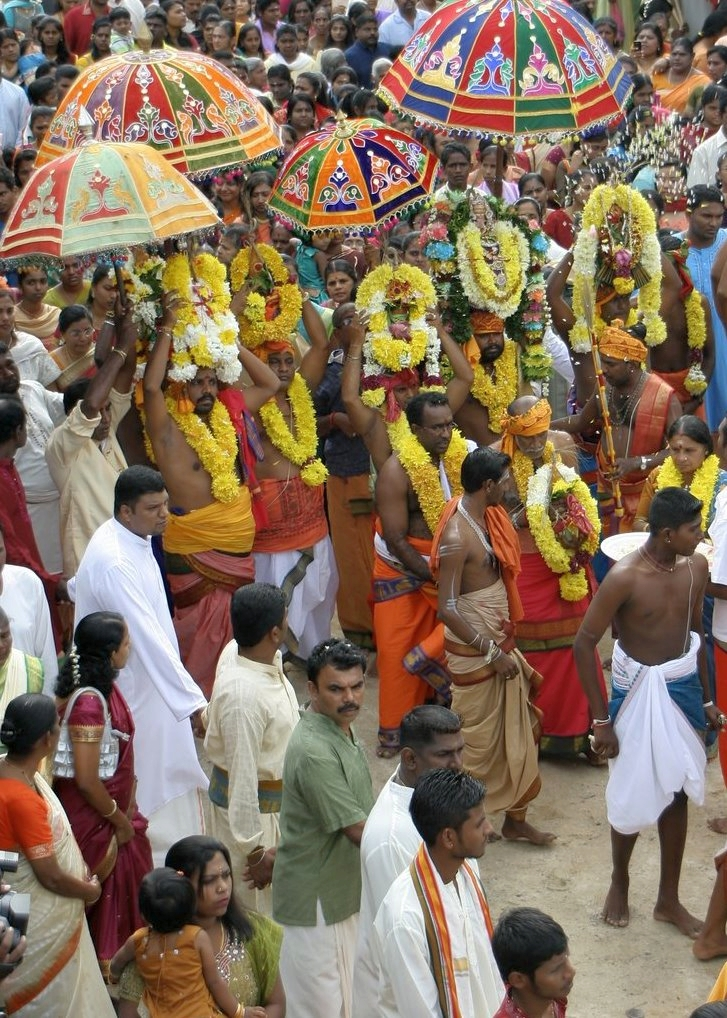
Kumbanishega ceremony (12 December 2010)

== Footnotes ==
- Rprabhu (5 May 2006). "The Glorious Garuda".
- Nadabhakti (17 June 2002). "A Little Garuda Story".
