= Town Padang Mosque =

Mosque in Ipoh, Perak, Malaysia

Coordinates: 4°35′57″N 101°04′02″E

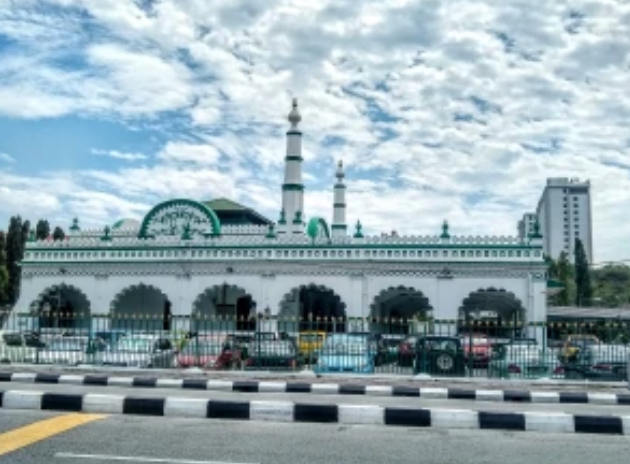

Religion
- Affiliation: Islam
- Sect: Hanafi

Location
- Location: Ipoh, Perak
- Country: Malaysia
- Interactive map of Town Padang Mosque

Architecture
- Style: Mughul
- Funded by: M.Shaik Adam
- Completed: April 1908

Town Padang Mosque, also known as the Indian Muslim Mosque, is situated on Jalan S.P. Seenivasagam in Ipoh, Perak, Malaysia.

== Background ==
The mosque was built to serve Indian Tamil Muslims of the Hanafi sect who had no place to worship, and was opened at a ceremony in April 1908.

The cost for the construction was approximately $25,000, including the land and building, of which $20,000 was provided by M. Shaik Adam, a wealthy businessman and proprietor of the Kinta Aerated Water Works, with the balance being provided by the government and other donors. He came to Perak in the late 1880s, and started as a tailor's clerk before he established his own business in Ipoh in the late 1890s. He made large donations to other religious institutions, and died in Taiping in 1912.

The square-shaped mosque, in a green and white design, was constructed in the Mughul architectural style and features scalloped arches.
