= Velodrome Rakyat =

Velodrome in Ipoh, Malaysia

- Velodrom Rakyat (Malay)
- Interactive map of Velodrome Rakyat
- Location: Ipoh, Malaysia
- Coordinates: 4.609136°N 101.100805°E
- Field size: 250 m (270 yd) track

The Velodrome Rakyat is a velodrome in Ipoh, Malaysia. It was inaugurated on 21 July 1989.

A 250-metre timber track, the velodrome has hosted many national and international events, including the World Cycling Championships B in 1997, the Track World Cup in 2000 and 2001, and the cycling events of the 1989 Southeast Asian Games.

== History ==
Tan Sri Dato' Seri Darshan Singh Gill, President of the Perak Cycling Association, identified the need for a velodrome in the country. Previously, the National Cycling Federation used to send track cyclists to neighbouring countries at a very high cost. With the approval of Sultan Azlan Shah of Perak, Darshan led a nationwide public donation drive and collected RM 3.25 million for the project.

In 2018, extensive renovation work was carried out on the velodrome. In August 2018, it was certified by the UCI for international competitions. In November 2024 through a press conference, the incumbent Minister of Youth and Sports, Hannah Yeoh mentioned on the need to visit the velodrome and potentially make funds available to upgrade the facility.

== See also ==
- List of cycling tracks and velodromes
- Sport in Malaysia
