= Leong Sin Nam =

Malaysian businessman (1880–1940)

- Born: 20 April 1880; Thai Chook Pau, Meixian County, Guangdong Province, Qing Empire
- Died: 19 January 1940 (aged 59); Port Dickson, Negeri Sembilan, Federated Malay States
- Occupations: Businessman, tin mine owner

Leong Sin Nam (梁燊南; 20 April 1880 – 19 January 1940), alias Leong Sin, Leung Sin, Leong Sin Hee, was a Malaysian businessman. He migrated and settled in British Malaya in 1898. From humble beginnings, he worked hard to become a wealthy tin mine owner in Perak. He was a businessman, an active community leader and a philanthropist. He was a Chinese revolutionary with similar aspirations as Sun Yat-sen and a strong supporter of the Chinese war efforts during the Sino-Japanese War.

== Early life ==
Leong Sin Nam was born on 20 April 1880 in Thai Chook Pau, a village in the district of Mooi Yan (Kaying), Guangdong province, south eastern China. He was a Hakka. His other names were Leong Sin, Leung Sin and Leong Sin Hee.

His father Leong Hin Fook (Chinese: 梁欽福; pinyin: Liáng Qīnfú), also known as Leong Tin Siew, left Guangdong with the family to settle in Penang in 1883. Leong Sin Nam was only 3 years old and had two younger brothers, Leong Yoon Hee and Leong Lian Hee. China was then ruled by the Qing dynasty where wars and famines were common. The failed Taiping Rebellion led by a Hakka caused widespread misery.

Leong Sin Nam grew up and received his early Chinese education in Penang. He was described as a brilliant and diligent scholar and completed a middle course in Chinese. However his education was interrupted by the death of his father in 1894. Leong Sin Nam then aged 14 years and being the eldest of the three sons took on the responsibility of looking after the family.

In 1896, Leong Sin Nam's mother decided to return to China with her husband's remains (ashes). During the journey she fell ill and died at Shantou. From Shantou, Leong Sin Nam hired a sampan and proceeded to Mooi Yan. Leong Sin Nam held the responsibility of burying his mother and looking after his two younger brothers aged 6 and 10 years old. He had a warm welcome on arrival in Mooi Yan.

Little was known of his teenage life in China. Apparently he led a carefree life and even experimented with opium. Fortunately for him he realised his errors in life early, repented and decided to start a new life in Malaya.

In 1898, Leong Sin Nam at age 18 years returned to Malaya. China was politically unstable. The Empress Dowager was fending off foreign intervention. The Boxer Rebellion was crumbling. The Chinese were attracted to British Malaya to work, trade and seek their fortunes in the tin fields. The British policies to increase the labour force to work in the tin mines fielded immigration to Malaya.

== Tin mining ==
Upon his arrival in Malaya Leong Sin Nam first worked as a mining labourer and then as a purchasing clerk in Perak. He worked and lived in a mining "kongsi" under the "Co-Operative System", commonly known as the "Fun-Si-Kai", whereby the employed entered himself as a shareholder, identifying his fortune with those of the mine. It was a long and hard struggle to make ends meet in the beginning, but with perseverance and self-denial, he succeeded brilliantly. He steadily climbed the ladder to become a supervisor. He was hardworking and made the best of his job. His employer, Leong Pit Loo, trusted and relied heavily on him for advice. In 1906, at age 25 years, they both went to Keng Chiow, China to investigate and learn more about the mining industry. This and other experiences laid the foundation for his future mining business. Leong Sin Nam once worked in the Leong Fee's tin mine at Tambun, four miles (6 km) away from Ipoh.

After working for several years, Leong Sin Nam saved some money and ventured into tin mining with other miners. He had several disappointments. His first break came in Telok Kruin. With a capital of $200 he entered into partnership with other miners and made a few thousand dollars. The price of tin was high then at $89 per pickul in 1906. Tin mining and prosperity in the Kinta valley had already surpassed Larut in importance. Tin was discovered in Kinta in the 1880s. In 1908 the Ipoh Tronoh branch railway opened. The railway line ran through rich mining centres like Menglembu, Lahat, Papan, Pusing and Siputeh.

In 1910 Leong Sin Nam started the Sin Nam Kongsi in Menglembu. The Leong Sin Nam Lode Mine was very profitable and with the profits he bought two other mines, one in Pusing in 1912 and the other at Falim in 1913. The Leong Sin Nam Lode mine was abandoned in 1917 because of subterranean streams which made mining activities dangerous. Attempts to pump out the water failed. Leong Sin Nam came to Ipoh, a booming tin mining town, in 1913. Ipoh was rapidly developing and had expanded across the Kinta River which divided the Old and the New Town. Brick houses had replaced attap houses after a great fire in 1892. The Birch Memorial Clock Tower, Rest House, Post Office and Town Hall, Yau Tet Shin Market, Church of England, Anderson School, Methodist Girls' School, Convent and Anglo-Chinese School buildings were already in existence. There were many successful European mining companies in Ipoh like the Tronoh Mines Ltd., Gopeng Tin Mining Co. Ltd.and Kinta Tin Mines Ltd. There were many successful Chinese miners too like Foo Choo Choon, Eu Tong Sen, Leong Fee, Chop Thai Lee, Chung Thye Phin, Au Moh Yi, Yau Tet Shin, Khi Ho Nin, Shak Yin Fuk, Lam Look Ing and Aw Kong all of whom were large employers of labour. There were three banks namely, the Chartered Bank of India, Australia and China, the Hong Kong and Shanghai Bank and later the Bank of Malaya Ltd. In view of the rapid development of Ipoh the Town Planning Committee of Ipoh was formed in 1914.

Leong Sin Nam was at different times the chairman and managing director of the Toh Allang Chinese Tin Ltd., the first Chinese limited liability company concerned with tin. It was formed in 1925 by Ho Man, Foo Choong Nyit and Chung Thye Pin.

In 1931 Leong Sin Nam bought the Ampang mine near Tambun from the son of Yau Tet Shin and started the Lean Pang Kongsi. Later, in 1933, he acquired the mining leases of the Ampang Tin Dredging (Perak) company. These mines covered an area of 1,800 acres (7.3 km^{2}) of land and were very profitable.

His mines were part mechanised to save labour which was expensive and in short supply. Even then these two large mines were once said to have supported the livelihood of more than 1,000 families. The tin ore was exported via ports like Teluk Anson and Port Weld which were already connected by the railways and roads to Ipoh.

In 1935 he was sent to China by a Limited Company to prospect for tin. Before he left for China he was entertained by the local Chinese community at the Chinese Assembly Hall, which included speeches by Lai Tet Loke and Cheong Yoke Choy. He left Malaya on 28 September 1935 by the boat "Cathay" and returned in December the same year. The trip turned out to be a disappointment because of poor transportation in China.

== Other business interests ==
By 1912 Leong Sin Nam had saved enough money and bought houses in Menglembu, Brewster Road and in 1919 a bungalow in Gopeng Road from a European which he renovated extensively in 1925. Later Leong Sin Nam ventured into real estate where he built several blocks of houses in Ipoh. He built houses on Leong Sin Nam Street, Anderson Road (1926), Falim (1928), Clarke Street (1929), Horley Street (1930) and two bungalows in Penang (1927) located at Ayer Rajah Road.

Leong Sin Nam owned and managed several large rubber estates. In 1912 he bought an estate at Siputeh and in 1913 with Lim Sin Chew as partner he bought land at Malim Nawar and in 1920 land in Jelapang for rubber planting. Other notable Chinese planters included Foo Choo Choon and Chung Thye Phin. Rubber plantations were found in Batu Gajah, Tanjong Tuallang, Chemor, Tanjong Rambutan and Gopeng.

Leong Sin Nam was also interested in the Chinese media. He was the chairman of the Malayan Chinese Daily News Ltd. in Kuala Lumpur and managing director of the Perak Chinese Daily News in Ipoh.

In 1933 Leong Sin Nam built a bungalow in Tanah Rata, Cameron Highlands, Pahang when access was made possible by a new road from Tapah. In 1934, recognising Cameron Highlands as a potential holiday resort destination, he and a group of people formed the Eastern Hotel Company where he was the chairman and built the Eastern Hotel. The company's aim in building the hotel was to provide comfortable accommodation at a cheap rate to the Chinese and others. The hotel was opened on 19 January 1935 and The Straits Times reported,

".....the Eastern Hotel consists of twelve bedrooms with private verandahs and bathrooms attached, one common or public lounge, a large dining room with kitchen and servants' quarters, a garage and for exercise tennis and badminton courts in front of the main building together with a lily and fish pond."

This hotel was a great help to the further development of Cameron Highlands for soon more people went there for a holiday. In 1935 following the success of the hotel Leong Sin Nam built another bungalow in Ringlet, Cameron Highlands.

He was also active in financial institutions where he was the chairman of the Perak Trust and Investment Co. Ltd. in Ipoh and a director of the Bank of Malaya Limited. He helped the foundations of the Bank of Malaya in 1920 and the Hakka Chung Khiaw Bank in Perak.

Lastly, he was a director of Kinta Electrical Distribution.

Leong Sin Nam's personal and trusted secretary was Thong Siew Seong.

== Contributions to charitable, educational, sporting and social institutions ==
Once established Leong Sin Nam quickly showed that he had no desire to hoard his wealth but others less fortunate than him should derive benefit from his success. From historic records, during the thirty years he had been in Malaya, he had contributed no less than half a million Straits dollars to charitable, educational, sporting and social institutions and later, particularly to the China Distress Relief Fund during the Second Sino-Japanese War.

Leong Sin Nam was a staunch supporter of education. In 1927 he made a concerted effort to study English because his duties as a Justice of the Peace and Member of the State Council required an understanding of the language. He had private English tuition every afternoon. However, he also considered important the promotion of Chinese culture and language among the Chinese. He was chiefly instrumental in securing Government aid for some of the Chinese schools in Ipoh beginning with the Yuk Choy Middle School.

Leong Sin Nam donated money to Chinese schools. The following schools were the recipients: Yuk Choy Middle School, Min Tet Chinese School and Chinese Girls' Public School all in Ipoh, Kwong Hon Kok Min School (Pusing), Yik Chee School (Pusing), Choong Woon School (Buntong) and the Ban Wah School (Menglembu).

Leong Sin Nam was the founder of the Kah Yin Association's Min Tet School which was established on 25 February 1913. The Ban Wah (Wan Hwah) School was established in 1914 by Leong Sin Nam following his successful mining ventures in Menglembu.

He also donated money to English Schools. In 1927 he donated $2,500 to the Anglo-Chinese Girls School Building Fund. Later in 1937 he donated $3,000 to the Anglo-Chinese School for building a science laboratory.

Placing great importance in education, he bequeathed the family bungalow in Gopeng Road, 5 acres (20,000 m^{2}) of land and furniture to the "Kah Heng Chew Huay Kuan" (Kaying Association) for the purpose of setting up a school. In accordance to the will the transfer was executed when his youngest son attained the age of 21 years. The Perak Girls School once occupied this bungalow before being re-sited to Kampar Road, Ipoh in 1947.

He was also interested in sports although he was not a "sportsman". He was especially interested in badminton and donated the "Leong Sin Nam" Challenge Cup for the Triangular Badminton Tournament between Perak, Selangor and Penang. He attended several meetings of the Perak Chinese Athletic Sports. He donated sports trophies in tennis and high jump to the Anglo-Chinese School.

Amongst his various hobbies, horse racing captured his interest most. He owned several horses with names like, "Mr. Polly", "Flushed", "Pelonis", "Gee Up". "Celestial", "New Zealand" and the "Maid of Cashel". "Mr. Polly" was perhaps the best horse he had owned.

The Kinta Swimming Club in Ipoh with its olympic-sized swimming pool was opened to the public in 1936 by Sultan Iskandar Shah, the Sultan of Perak. The pool relied on a continuous supply of fresh water brought by pipes from the Leong Sin Nam mines near the Kledang Hills. Leong Sin Nam donated a diving board to the Club.

The Coronation of King George VI and Queen Elizabeth in 1937 was celebrated in Ipoh with great fanfare. Leong Sin Nam sponsored the lion troupes and dragon parties at his residence.

== Involvement in local government ==
Between 1914 and 1918 the State Government of Perak authorised Leong Sin Nam to issue private paper currency to overcome the shortage of coins towards the end of World War I

According to the F.M.S. Government Gazette Leong Sin Nam was appointed into the Perak State Council in 1920.

"HRH the Sultan of Perak has been pleased with the approval of the Chief Secretary to the Government to appoint Mr. Leong Sin Nam to be a member of Council of State since Mr. Foo Choo Choon resigned".

In the same year in April Leong Sin Nam was appointed Justice of Peace for Perak and to the Perak Chinese Advisory Board.

In 1921, Leong Sin Nam was one of the Malayans who was introduced to HRH the Prince of Wales who called on the Malay Peninsula after his tour in India. The Malaya-Borneo Exhibition was held in Singapore to celebrate the royal visit. Leong Sin Nam established a fund for the Perak exhibits (mining models, Ipoh Town models) and volunteered to publicise the Exhibition among the Chinese communities by distributing handbills printed in Chinese giving details about the objectives of the Exhibition. The Exhibition was a great success.

Kinta experienced a crisis during the post World War 1 period from 1921 to 1922 when the demand for tin fell. The effect of the sudden ending of hostilities at a time when special efforts were being made to increase tin production during the war was to present to the producers an unanticipated drop in demand for tin. There was great financial distress amongst the tin producers in Kinta with resulting mass unemployment. The recommendations of the Retrenchment Commission prevented much from being done in the way of relief through a program of public works. The government's chief solution to the problem was the repatriation, at their own expense, the large number of unemployed back to their homes in China or India. The policy was quite effective. The Ipoh Chinese Relief Camp was established under the leadership of Leong Sin Nam and remained in existence till 1923. Leong Sin Nam ranked second to none in Perak in the purchase of China Liberty Bonds which helped to finance the passage of these Chinese poor back to China.

On 23 September 1924, Leong Sin Nam, Chung Thye Phin and other prominent residents were introduced to HM King Rama VI at the railway station in Ipoh while on the way to Singapore.

In the 1930s the agitation for the transfer of the Perak state capital from Taiping to Ipoh was revived. Leong Sin Nam spoke in favour of the transfer of the state capital to Ipoh in 1934 at a State Council meeting in Taiping, Perak.

"I crave leave to move that this Council do make provision for the transfer of the capital of the State to Ipoh at the earliest possible moment. The question of Ipoh being made the capital of the State has been thoroughly discussed and finally approved by the Government years ago ... Apart from the incalculable convenience both to the administration and to the members of the public which will result by reason of the change there is one further reason why Ipoh should be made the capital of the State. Ipoh with its modern and imposing buildings, well laid out roads and grounds and rapidly increasing importance as a business centre has no rival as the principal town in the State and as such is eminently suitable and fit to be made the capital. I would also like to impress upon this Council the desirability of proceeding without further delay with the construction of the various public offices and residential quarters of the officials who will be stationed in Ipoh as a result of the change, for I know as an employer of labour, that the price of material and labour will increase rapidly. If delay is occasioned I greatly fear that the expense of the change will be considerably increased".

In 1929, the tin and rubber prices dropped again. Many mines and plantations closed. Leong Sin Nam and his fellow towkays started the Kinta Unemployment Committee which provided a monthly relief fund for the unemployed.

The Great Depression in the 1930s affected the world and Perak was no exception as the world demand for tin and other commodities fell. The Tin Restriction Scheme was introduced to curtail the output of tin so as to maintain a stable price. This reduction in tin output meant that labour had to be reduced and consequently unemployment was rife.

In 1938 Leong Sin Nam proposed a scheme to stabilise labour, both Chinese and Indian, as a means of reducing unemployment during slumps yet not prevent their return to the mines and rubber estates when so needed during better times. He suggested the flotation of a $1,000,000 limited liability company to buy 1,000 acres (4.0 km^{2}) of land for a large-scale settlement of between 5,000 and 7,000 unemployed persons. The Company was to cultivate the land particularly with cashew nuts, amongst other commercially viable crops, and later hand this over to the settlers who would buy shares and eventually become sole owners of the property. The scheme was rejected in May 1939 because it involved too much money.

== Rendering assistance to the Chinese government in China ==
Leong Sin Nam was a Chinese revolutionary like Sun Yat-sen who wanted a complete overthrow of the Qing dynasty. Sun managed to set up the Ipoh branch of the Tongmenghui with the help of Wang Jingwei in 1907 after much opposition from the Reformists led by Foo Choo Choon in Ipoh. The Reformists wanted to establish a constitutional monarch in China. However, Foo had a change of heart following the Wuchang Uprising which led to the collapse of the Qing government on 10 October 1911 and threw his full support behind the revolution. The Principal Leaders of the Tung Meng Hui Branch in Ipoh were Teh Lay-seng, Lee Guan-swee, Au Sheng-kang and Leong Sin Nam. The Malayan Tung Meng Hui movement, not registered with the Registrar of Societies, was institutionalised through underground branches and front organisations, including reading rooms and theatrical troupes. Singapore served as regional headquarters for the movement until 1908 and Penang from 1909 to 1911.

The main function of the reading rooms was to raise the revolutionary consciousness of the Chinese through the provision of reading materials including books, magazines, journals and newspapers. They also served as screening and recruiting offices for new members. The theatrical troupes were used to spread revolutionary messages and were more popular, effective and appealing to the illiterate labourers. The newspapers were important in sustaining the anti-Manchu feelings among the literate sector of the Chinese community and later the political climate in China.

The Tung Meng Hui became an open and legalised political party known as the Kuomintang when the Last Emperor abdicated on 12 February 1912. The Kuomintang branch in Ipoh was registered with the Registrar of Societies on 25 May 1913 and dissolved on 27 November 1927. Perak seemed to be the stronghold of the KMT Movement in the Federated Malay States with 27 registered branches principally because of the efforts of the original 4 leaders of the Tung Meng Hui in Ipoh including Leong Sin Nam who became the branch President. The Kuomintang was the first legalised political institution in Malayan history with headquarters in Peking

When the Republic of China was founded in 1912, Sun was elected as the first "Provisional President" by the provisional Senate ending imperial rule in China. Sun soon resigned from the office in favour of Yuan Shikai, commander of the Beiyang Army of northern China, who formerly assumed the office of President of the Chinese Republic and became its first President. Yuan soon asserted his presidential powers, abolished the National Assembly and later proclaimed himself the emperor of China in 1915 in a largely unpopular move and was later forced to retract his declaration shortly before his death in 1916. The Kuomintang was outlawed in China in 1914 and was known as the Chinese Revolutionary Party. The Ipoh Branch of the Chinese Revolutionary Party raised a good sum of money to support Sun against his arch rival Yuan.

Following Yuan's death China fragmented into warlordism. Sun, forced into exile earlier, returned to China in 1917 to advocate unification. He re-established the KMT in October 1919. He started a self-proclaimed military government in Guanzhou, southern China in 1921 and was elected as president and generalissimo. He established the Whampoa Military Academy with Chiang Kai-shek as the commandant in preparation for the Northern Expedition. The Chinese Communist Party was founded in July 1921.

Leong Sin Nam lent support to Sun's efforts to reunify China. The warlord period ended in 1928 when the Northern Expedition succeeded in conquering northern China. The KMT organised the expedition with assistance from the Chinese communist. For his support, Leong Sin Nam was presented with a signed congratulatory photo message and a Certificate of Honour by Sun. When Sun died in 1925 Leong Sin Nam supported his successor generalissimo Chiang Kai-shek. When Chiang became the leader of the KMT, he dismissed the communist and formed the Nationalist Government in Nanjing in 1927.

Leong Sin Nam's political affiliation and fame as a prominent miner reached China. The Government officials of Yunnan Province, China invited him to demonstrate and instruct the Chinese miners how to use the modern mining methods adopted in Malaya. The Governor in appreciation decorated him and appointed him Warden of Mines for Yunnan Province. The chief tin producing centre in China was the Kochu district in Southern Yunnan where cassiterite was obtained from deposits and rock ores. Tin was also produced in Guangxi, Jiangxi, Guangdong and Hunan.

Even though Leong Sin Nam was in Malaya he held several posts in various departments in China. He was the Adviser of the Chinese Ministry of Agriculture and Commerce, Warden of Mines for Yunnan Province, Member of the Economic Committee of the Chinese Government, committee member of the Kwantung Branch of Reconstruction Commission and one of the four members of the People's Assembly of the Republic of China in Malaya. In recognition of his services he was awarded medals by Sun Yat-en, Ministry of Education, Ministry of Finance and President Li Yuanhong, China.

In 1937 the second Sino Japanese War began. The China Distress Relief Fund (China Red Cross Fund) was started to alleviate the distress amongst the wounded in the war zones in China. By November 1937 a sum of 1,450,000 yuan was collected. Leong Sin Nam was the chairman of the Perak Overseas Chinese Distress Relief Fund committee and donated 20,000 yuan to the fund. In recognition of his timely contribution Generallisimo Chiang Kai-shek presented Leong Sin Nam with a signed congratulatory photo message. In 1938 in his presidential address at the Perak Chinese Chamber of Commerce Leong Sin Nam said he was glad to note the unity prevailing among all Chinese in the State and the admirable way they had responded to the needs of the China Red Cross Fund. Referring to the crisis in China, he stressed the fact that only a united front could secure an ultimate victory for China and they must all contribute their share whether it be big or small. On another occasion, he remarked that

"though China has lost some of her most important cities the morale and courage of the overseas Chinese in Malaya should not be shattered"

In the same year he contributed 120 pounds towards the "Gold Drive" in aid of the Chinese Fund. This was followed by yet another generous contribution of $10,000 towards the Perak Chinese Branch of the Patriotic Fund in 1939. Even on his death bed in 1940 he told his family to reduce the funeral expenses for a more worthy cause in China.

== Contributions to the local Chinese community ==
Leong Sin Nam contributed $7,500 towards the erection of the new Chinese Maternity Hospital in Kampar Road. The 61/2 acre land was presented by Foo Choon Yit, Foo Nyit Tse and Cheah Chong Siew. The original Ipoh Maternity Hospital started in 1904 was located in Chamberlain Road whose land was presented by Cheah Cheang Lim. Other notables in the early founding of the hospital were RM Connolly, Foo Choo Choon, and Leong Fee. Leong Sin Nam was president of the Perak Chinese Maternity Association in 1926. The Chinese Maternity Hospital building was declared open on 7 October 1939 by the High Commissioner Sir Shenton Thomas.

Leong Sin Nam's further contribution was when he helped to build the Ipoh Chinese Assembly Hall at Kuala Kangsar Road. During this time all important meetings were held at the Ipoh Town Hall facing the Railway Station. He together with other Chinese advocated for a larger building. An appeal was made to all Chinese workmen in Perak to subscribe to the building fund by a contribution of $3 per labourer to collect a total sum of $250,000 – $150,000 for the Assembly Hall and $100,000 for the adjacent School Building. Leong Sin Nam contributed $20,000 towards the project and he laid the foundation stone on 6 October 1937. The building was finally completed in 1939.

Leong Sin Nam was the second President of the Perak Chinese Chamber of Commerce, after Foo Choo Choon the first President, in 1920. He was the mouthpiece for the Chinese and expressed their grievances over the rubber restrictions known as the "Stevenson Scheme" introduced on 1 November 1922.

== Public service ==
Busy as he was with his own business, he still found time to render yeoman services to various public bodies of which he was a prominent member. He was at various times:-

- Member of the Perak State Council
- Member of the Perak Chinese Advisory Board
- Member of the Po Leung Kuk Committee
- Member of the Council of the Federated Malay States Chamber of Mines in Ipoh
- President of the Perak Mining and Planting Association
- President of the Perak Chinese Chamber of Commerce in Ipoh
- President of the Perak Chinese Association in Ipoh
- Vice-president of the Khek Community Guild in Singapore
- President of the Perak Chinese Maternity Hospital in Ipoh
- President of the Perak Kaying Guild in Ipoh
- President of the Yuk Choy Public Chinese School in Ipoh
- President of the Perak Public Girls School in Ipoh
- Chairman of the Perak Overseas Chinese in aid of China Distress Relief Fund in Ipoh
- Chairman of the Ipoh Rate Payers Association
- Chairman of the Overseas Chinese Mining Association

== Awards ==
Various awards were bestowed upon him for his meritorious service.

- Order of Oi Kok Cheong, conferred by the Minister of Finance for distinguished services rendered to the Chinese Republic Government
- Mun Foo medal, awarded by Mr. Li Yuanhong, President of the Chinese Republic Government in recognition of valuable services rendered while in the capacity of chairman, Perak Chinese Chamber of Commerce, Ipoh.
- Koonk Woh medals, awarded by General Tong Kai Yau, Commander of the Yunnan Army for meritorious services rendered in the re-establishment of the Republic of China.
- Distinguished Services Medal, awarded by General Chan Kuen Ming, Commander of the Kwantung Army for valuable services rendered to the Army.
- Seah Wui medal, awarded by the Kwantung Provincial Government for distinguished services rendered in the re-establishment of the Republic of China.
- Hing Hock medal, awarded by the Chinese Education Bureau of China, in appreciation of valuable services rendered in the cause of Chinese Education in Ipoh.
- Meritorious Service medal, awarded by the Chinese Consulate in Penang.
- Justice of Peace, awarded by the British Government, 1920
- Medal presented by the King Rama VI of Thailand while on visit to Ipoh, Perak, 1924 in appreciation of the welcome extended to His Royal Highness on the occasion of His State visit.
- Malayan Certificate of Honour, granted by HE Sir Hugh Clifford, High Commissioner of the Federated Malay States on recommendation by HRH Sultan Iskandar Shah, Sultan of Perak, on 3 June 1929 for loyal and valuable services to the Government of the Federated Malay States.
- Loyal and Valuable Service Medal, awarded by HM King George V, 1935
- Silver Jubilee Medal, in commemoration of the Silver Jubilee of their Majesties King George V and Queen Mary, 1935
- Coronation Medal, received in commemoration of the Coronation of their Majesties King George VI and Queen Elizabeth, 1937
- Most Excellent Order of the British Empire, conferred by HM King George VI, 1937

== Honorary Officer of the Most Excellent Order of the British Empire ==
The ceremony to confer the Honour was presided by the British Resident, Mr. C.E. Cator who pointed out in his speech that the OBE conferred on Leong Sin Nam was a very rare one, that being only the second time a non-British subject had been honoured by the King, the first being the late towkay Loke Yew of Kuala Lumpur. The High Commissioner to the Federated Malay States, Sir Shenton Thomas, then made his speech prior to the reading of the Royal Warrant for the conferment of the Most Excellent Order of the British Empire.

"I am commanded by His Majesty the King to present to Mr. Leong Sin Nam the badge of his appointment to be an Honorary Officer of the Most Excellent Order of the British Empire. Mr. Leong Sin Nam has been in Malaya for 50 years, and in the State of Perak particularly he has been associated with many public charitable bodies which have for their object the well being of the local Chinese. Since 1920 he has been a member of the Perak State Council and a Justice of the Peace. He is a committee member of the Perak Chinese Maternity Hospital. In 1929, he was awarded the Malayan Certificate of Honour. His influence has always been exercised in the best interests of the community and his unobtrusive but generous philanthropy has supported many deserving institutions. It is a pleasure to us all and especially to the Chinese people of Perak that His Majesty has been graciously pleased to recognise the public services of so worthy a citizen. I trust that Mr. Leong Sin Nam will be spared for many years to give his services to the State and to its people, whose gratitude and admiration he has long since won."

The ceremony was held at the Ipoh Club, which, for the first time in its history, was thrown open for the entertainment of a Chinese towkay, his wife and friends. Amongst the guests present and gave congratulatory speeches were Hon. Mr. S.B. Palmer, Mr. Wong Chin Tong, Hon. Colonel Cecil Rae, Dato Wahab (Kaya Kaya Panglima Bukit Gantang), Mr. W.J.B. Ashby and Mr. S. Seenivasagam.

Letters of congratulation were received from the Hon. Mr. Ormsby-Gore (Secretary of State for the Colonies), Sir Shenton Thomas (The High Commissioner of the Federated Malay States), Hon. Mr. A.B. Jordan (Singapore), Mr. G.E. Cator (The British Resident of Perak), Mr. Justice A.B. Howes (Singapore), Mr. Justice Aitken (Ipoh), Raja Omar (The Raja Bendahara of Ipoh), Major O.B. Williams (Batu Gajah), Lt. Col. G.M.P. Hornidge (Batu Gajah), Mr. J.C. McEvett (Muar), Mr. Lee Choon Guan (Singapore), Mr. Lim Cheng Ean (Penang), Mr. Lai Tet Loke (Kuala Lumpur), Mr. & Mrs. S. Seenivasagam (Ipoh), Mr. & Mrs. J. Dunford Wood (Ipoh), Mr. E.C. Watson (Ipoh), Mr. H.G. Nelson (Ipoh), Mr. Louis Thivy (Ipoh), Mr. A Bean (Batu Gajah), Mr. & Mrs. H.F.C. Greenwood (Ipoh), Mr. R. Burns (Ipoh), Mr. & Mrs. H. Kingdon-Rowe (Ipoh), Mr. F.W. Palmer (Kuala Lumpur), Mr. S.D. Scott (Ipoh), Mr. C. Grant (Ipoh), Mr. H.B. Talalla (Kuala Lumpur), Mr. A.C. Godding (Ipoh), Fletcher Trading Co. (Ipoh), Lindeteves-Stokvis (Ipoh), Mr. Seow Por Leng (Singapore), Mr. Lee Swee Hoe (Ipoh), Mr. Lee Ah Weng (Ipoh), Mr. Cheah Ghim Leng (Ipoh), Mr. H.S. Lee (Kuala Lumpur), Mr. Lim Eow Thoon (Penang), Mr. J.R. Vethavanamm (Kuala Lumpur), Mr. Y.T. Cheng (Kuala Lumpur), Mr. Yee Moh Seong (Penang), Mr. J.P. Morsingh (Penang), Mr. P. Thambyah (Ipoh), Mr. Tan Cheng Wah (Jelebu), Mr. Kam Saik Chuan (Cameron Highlands), Mr. Loo Khee Kong (Bukit Mertajam), Mr. A.C. Moreira (Ipoh), The Directors and Staff of St. Michael's Institution (Ipoh), Perak Chinese Recreation Club, Rotary Club (Ipoh), Oversea-Chinese Banking Corporation (Ipoh), Perak Badminton Association, Kinta District Badminton Association, The Old Michaelians' Association (Ipoh).

Telegrams of congratulation were received from His Highness the Sultan of Perak, The British Resident of Perak, Mr. A.M. Goodman (The Resident Councillor of Penang), The Raja Muda (Ipoh), Mr. Huang Yen Kai (Penang), Mr. Lu Tse Chin (Kuala Lumpur), Mr. Toh Eng Hoe (Taiping), Mr. Walter Grenier (Kuala Lumpur), Mr. Ngim Wee Cheow (Malacca), Mr. Yap Tai Chi (Kuala Lumpur), Mr. Au Phin Yeang (Teluk Anson), Mr. J.B. Ashby (Ipoh), Mrs. White and Kitty (Cameron Highlands), Mr. L. Vaughan (Kuala Lumpur), Mr. Chin Sen Lim (Ipoh), Mr. Sng Choon Yee (Singapore), The Kheh Guild (Singapore), Yin Foh Fui Kwon (Singapore).

== Other honours ==
Two roads were named after Leong Sin Nam. One in Ipoh New Town and another in Tanah Rata, Cameron Highlands.

== Family ==
Leong Sin Nam was married to five wives and had eight sons (the first two sons were adopted) and eight daughters.

He married his first wife, Miss Wong Kim Thai at Kampar in 1909. The other four wives were Chew Nyit Fah (second), Lee Loon Yon (third), Voon Soon Moi (fourth) and Chee Liew Kim (fifth).

The names of the sons: Leong Mook Nyean, Leong Yin Nyean, Leong Yeow Nyean, Leong Khuen Nyean, Leong Khoon Nyean, Leong Khee Nyean and Leong Wai Nyean, Leong Fon Nyean.

The names of the daughters: Leong Chu Yoon, Leong Kim Yoon, Leong Ay Yoon, Leong Chooi Yoon, Leong Paik Yoon, Leong Kian Yoon, Leong Keong Yoon, Leong Lee Yoon.

The family bungalow was at 17, Gopeng Road, Ipoh, Perak.

== Later years ==
The social stress and heavy responsibilities of public life during the Great Depression and the Sino-Japanese Hostilities exerted a heavy toll on Leong Sin Nam. Age was catching on and his health began to fail in 1939. On his doctor's advice he went to Java to recuperate. It was also suggested that he should take opium but he refused for he knew that it would be useless and he remembered too the time when opium smoking nearly ruined his life. Despite the trip to Java, his health failed to improve and he returned to his bungalow in Port Dickson where he died on 19 January 1940 at age 60 years. His body was brought back in a special train to Ipoh on 22 January and laid in the family residence for eleven days. HRH the Sultan Abdul Aziz of Perak and the acting British Resident of Perak, Mr. N.F.H. Mather were among the distinguished people who paid their last respect. On the day of the funeral all Chinese businesses were closed in the morning. His funeral was described as the grandest in Ipoh and the procession was about two miles (3 km) long. He was the first to be buried in the Cantonese cemetery in Gopeng Road, Ipoh and 38,523 square feet (3,578.9 m^{2}) of land was presented to his family for his grave.

After his death both English and Chinese newspapers eulogised his fine qualities. The Straits Echo reported

"The passing away of towkay Leong Sin Nam at Port Dickson will cause wide spread regret for he was deservedly popular and much respected, his good works in Perak being as numerous as the sands on the seashore, while by his urbanity and strict integrity, he endeared himself to all whom he came in contact...... he was popular not only with his countrymen but also with Europeans, Eurasians, Indians, Malays and Ceylonese. Socially, he was the best of good fellows. He had no acquaintances, for to know him was to be his friend. As a public man he spared neither time nor trouble in carrying out zealously the duties which public life entails. He never used his position to which he attained with any idea of self advertisement. One of the most modest man one can meet anywhere his aim was always to do good. The same aim influenced his whole life. He was a good man trying according to his lights to be of service to his countrymen. He was so genial, well meaning, earnest and honest".

His death in 1940 should be celebrated because soon after in 1941 Malaya was invaded by the Japanese beginning with the bombing of Singapore on 8 December 1941. Ipoh was invaded on 15 December 1941 and occupied on 28 December. Leong Sin Nam's pro British and Chinese stance would surely had brought disaster to himself and the family when Britain and China were at war with Japan during the Second World War. Leong Sin Nam's bungalow was seized by the Japanese and became the headquarters of the notorious Japanese Military Police (Kempeitai) headed by the infamous Ekio Yoshimura.

The stories of good men usually have good endings. The Americans dropped atomic bombs on Hiroshima and Nagasaki in August 1945. The Japanese surrendered on 15 August 1945. The British forces landed in Penang on 3 September 1945. Ipoh was soon liberated. Leong Sin Nam's family survived without casualties.
