= Han Chin Pet Soo =

Hakka tin mining museum in Ipoh, Malaysia

- 闲真别墅
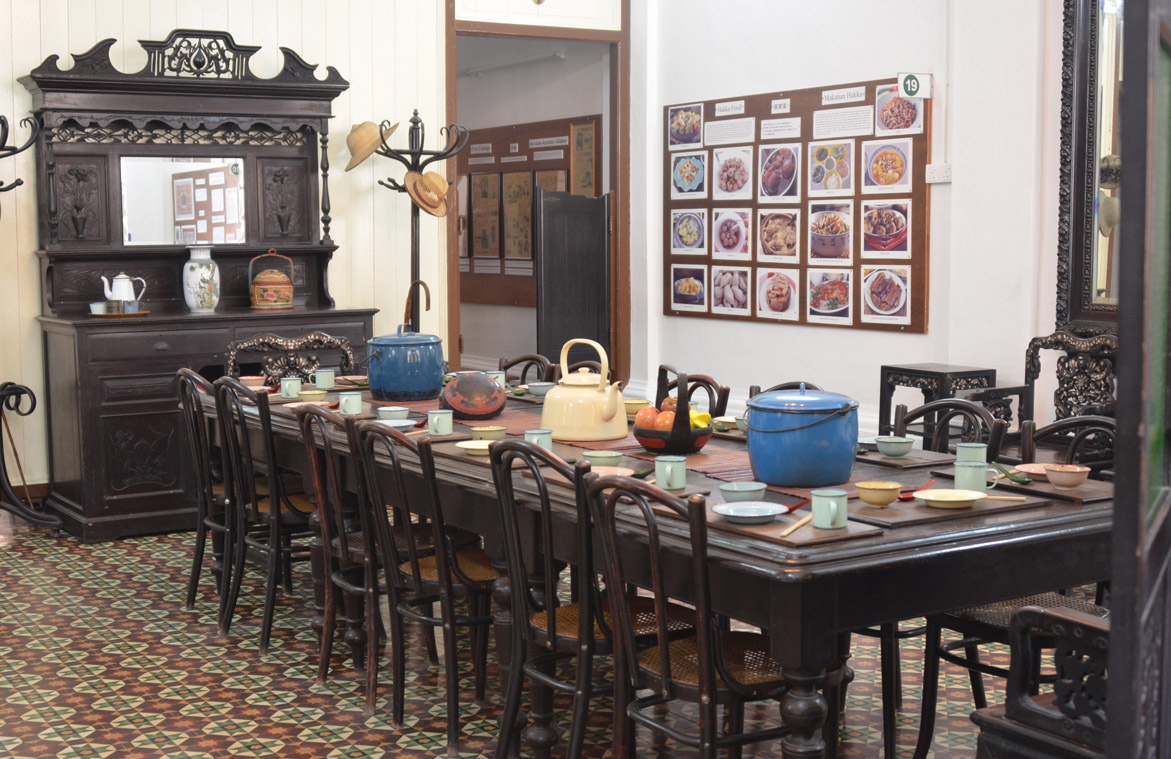
- The dining hall of Han Chin Pet Soo
- Established: January 2015
- Location: 3, Jalan Bijeh Timah, 30100 Ipoh, Perak, West Malaysia
- Coordinates: 4°35′46″N 101°4′44″E
- Collection size: 1500+
- Curator: Commander Ian Anderson RN (Rtd)
- Website: www.ipohworld.org

Chinese name
- Traditional Chinese: 閒真別墅
- Simplified Chinese: 闲真别墅
Transcriptions
Standard Mandarin
- Hanyu Pinyin: Xiánzhēn Biéshù
Hakka
- Romanization: Han2-zin1 Ped6-su3

Han Chin Pet Soo (闲真别墅) is Malaysia's first Hakka tin mining museum and is the number one attraction in Ipoh on TripAdvisor. Located on the edge of Ipoh's Old Town, close to the Kinta River, it is in walking distance of the well-known Panglima Lane (Concubine Lane). It is managed by Ipoh World Sdn. Bhd.

The two-story home of the Hakka Tin Miners Club was originally founded in 1893. This building was rebuilt in 1929. With three floors and approximately 5000 square feet, the museum displays artifacts, collectibles, ephemera, and photographs from the 19th and 20th century. Within the museum, murals painted by local students at the Perak Institute of Art replicate the experience of being within a tin mine.

Opened in February 2015, the museum attracted more than 6000 visitors in its first six months, and volume has steadily increased. The museum is open Tuesday to Sunday, but visitors must book online or in person to schedule their visit.

== History ==
In 1876, 19-year old Leong Fee, also known as Liang Pi Joo, and 16 other immigrants arrived and settled at Ipoh, then a gathering of Malay huts between the river and the jungle. They were the only Chinamen in Ipoh and had traveled by river from Penang via Telok Mak Intan (now Teluk Intan).

Fee, who was born in 1857 in Meixian District, Guangdong Province, China, took an old freighter to Weld Quay, Penang in 1876 to seek his fortune in Nanyang (the Southern Seas), the Chinese name for Malaya. He worked in Penang as a cook and hawker for about six months before arriving in Ipoh with the spiritual tablet of the deity Tua Pek Kong. To give giving thanks for their safe arrival after an arduous and at times dangerous journey, Fee founded the Tai Pak Koong, or God of Prosperity Temple, alongside the Kinta River.

Fee prospected for tin, initially supplementing his income as a clerk. Over time, he became well-known and successful with a mine at Ampang. By the late 1880s, he had sufficient resources to travel back to China, returning to Ipoh in 1889 with continued success.

After the “Great Fire of Ipoh” on June 1, 1892, Fee built some of the first brick houses in Leech Street in 1893. That same year, on the 5th day of the 5th moon, he formed the Han Chin Tin Miners' Club, a two-story shophouse where the museum stands today.

Club membership was restricted to Hakka miners, who could connect with their colleagues and friends or have a meal. Lodging facilities were also available for relatives and friends. Members could legally play mahjong, as they received a copy of a memo from the District Magistrate, Kinta to the Assistant Magistrate Ipoh, dated 1 February 1897, stating: “The members of the Chinese Club, Ipoh have permission to gamble in their house pending the issue of a formal licence. Sd/- Cecil P. Villy".

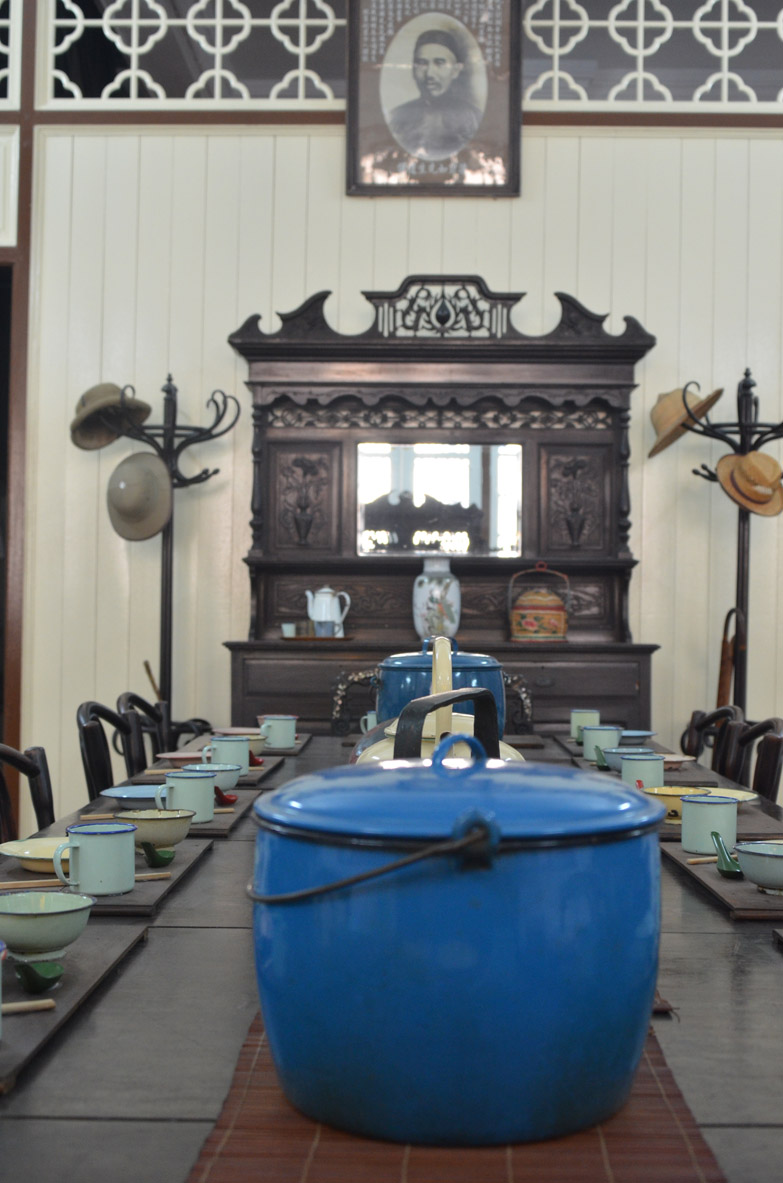
A shot of the dining table taken at the head of the table

The club was run at Fee’s expense until his death in April 1912. Then, his son Leong Yin Khean a.k.a. Liang En-Chuen, together with Lim Chang Jiu, Leong Jin Yuen, Leong Moon Chow, Leong Rui Dian, Pan Jing Ting and Sze Hua continued to sponsor the club. In 1927, Leong Yin Khean purposely devalued the land and sold the house to the club members at a less than the market price.

In 1929, the building was renovated into the three-story villa with balcony that it is today. For its 37th anniversary, on May 5, 1930, members held a house-warming party for their club. It was lit by electricity, which came to Ipoh earlier in the year.

In 1941, the Japanese invaded Ipoh and the building was illegally sold without member knowledge. In 1945, ownership was rightfully restored to members. In the 1960s, there were other renovations for air conditioning, and the original elegantly curved front bay windows were replaced.

As the great tin mining era waned, the number of miners did too. By 2012, the membership was insufficient to support building maintenance. Consequently, white ants took over the timbers, pigeons took roost in the balconies and bedrooms, and the building’s future was in doubt.

Club members voted to lease the building to ipohWorld, a heritage group dedicated to restoring it and making it a tourist attraction. Their mission is complete, and the curved front bay windows have been restored. N.B. Historical details about the club before 1959 are taken from the adjacent club history by club member Leong Kok An in Chinese characters, dated May 5, 1959.

== The exhibition ==
=== Tin mining ===
With tin mining playing a prominent role in the development of Ipoh and the Kinta Valley, this section that uses original tin mining equipment highlights the process of mining for tin from prospecting for tin to the drying of tin ore. This section includes a historic video explaining the process of tin mining in the 1940s.

=== Kitchen ===
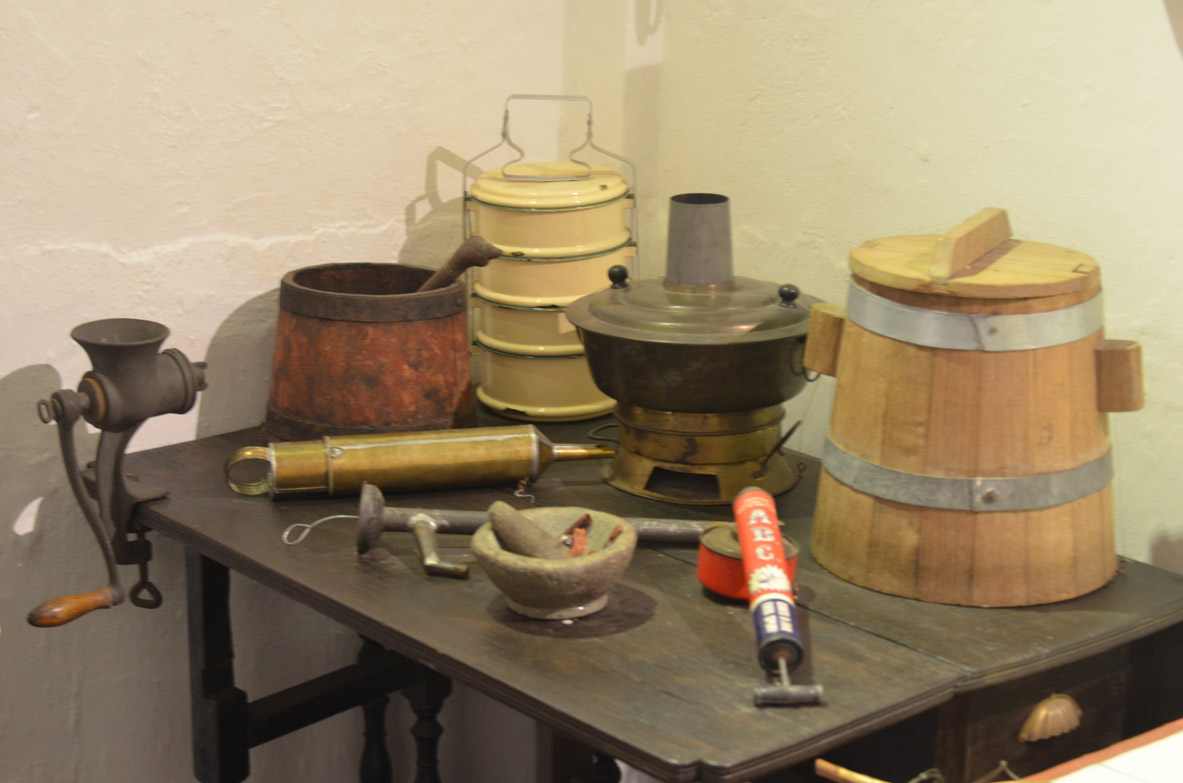
Utensils that would have been used in a 1920s / 1930s kitchen.

To serve the function of providing meals for the club members, a well-stocked kitchen would have played an important role. Restored it to its 1929 / 1930 standard, the kitchen has three charcoal and one wood-fired stove, kitchen utensils and tins appropriate to the period.

=== Town square ===
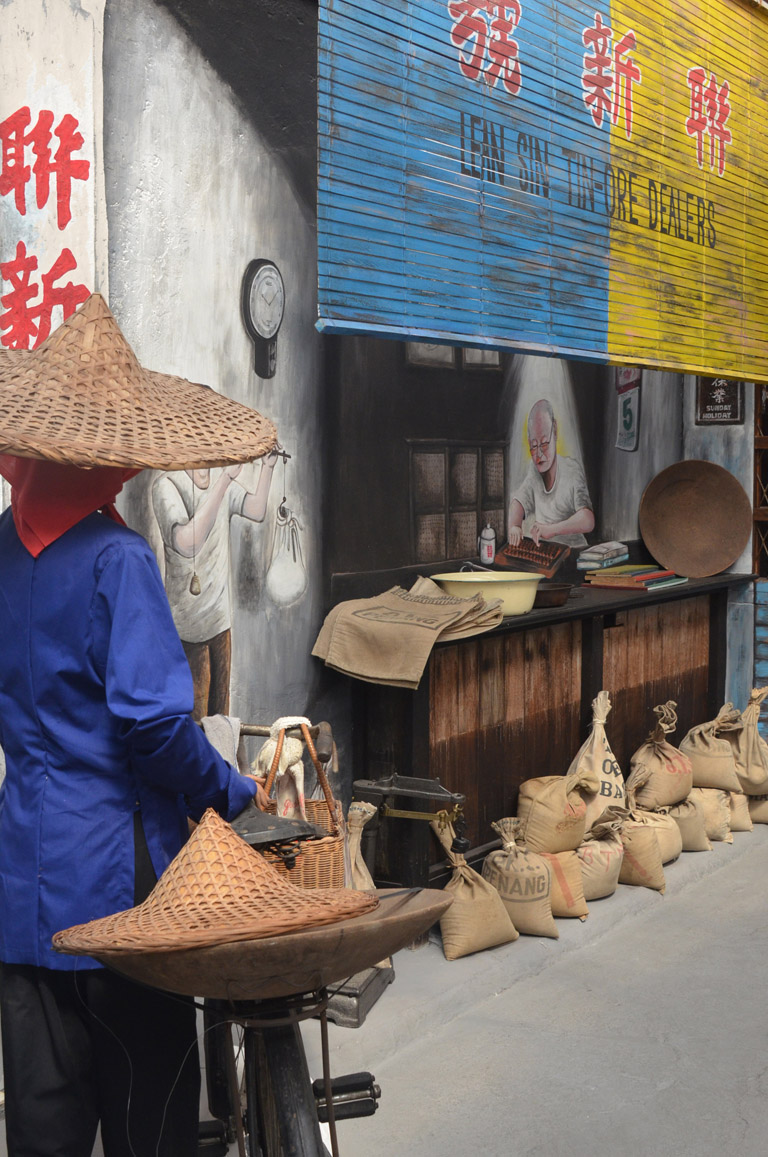
Part of the Town Square in Han Chin Pet Soo is its Tin Shop.

The backyard has been transformed into a town square, ideal for photography the area includes a mural of a tin dredge, a street in Ipoh and a tin shop to complete the story of tin.

=== Activities of the club ===
The first floor of the building is dedicated to activities of the club members over the 122 years of its history. Full sized dioramas demonstrate how the club would have looked in its heyday.

=== Hakka floor ===
Moving on to the second floor is the guest floor where the club housed guests with the condition; they were Hakka males that were friends' of a member of the club. Coincidentally, Hakka means guest in English, seizing the opportunity, it was set up to illustrate the 1000 year long history of the Hakka people.

== Facilities ==
The museum caters to guests who by prior arrangement would like to have a Hakka themed dinner at the Hakka Tin Miners Club. The museum is not completely wheelchair-friendly as there are no lifts to the upper floors, but the ground floor, however, may be accessed by those who use a wheelchair. The museum also has restrooms on the ground floor, although they are not disabled-friendly.

== Gallery ==
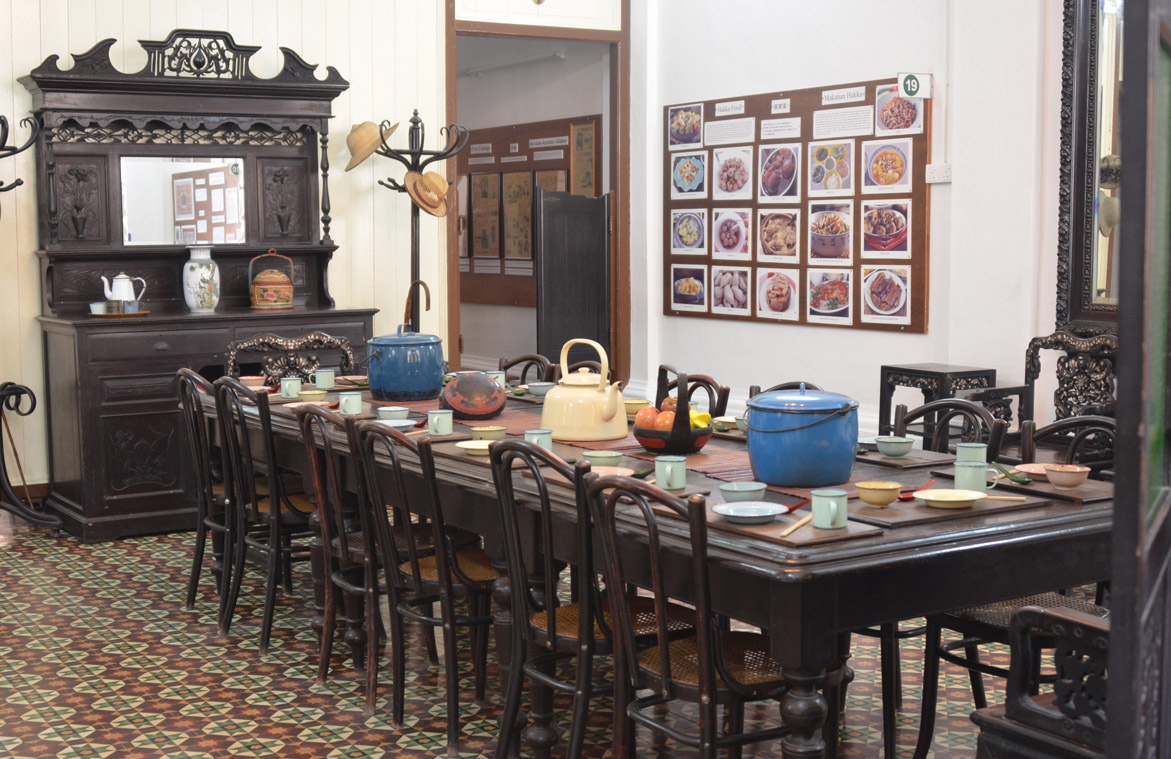

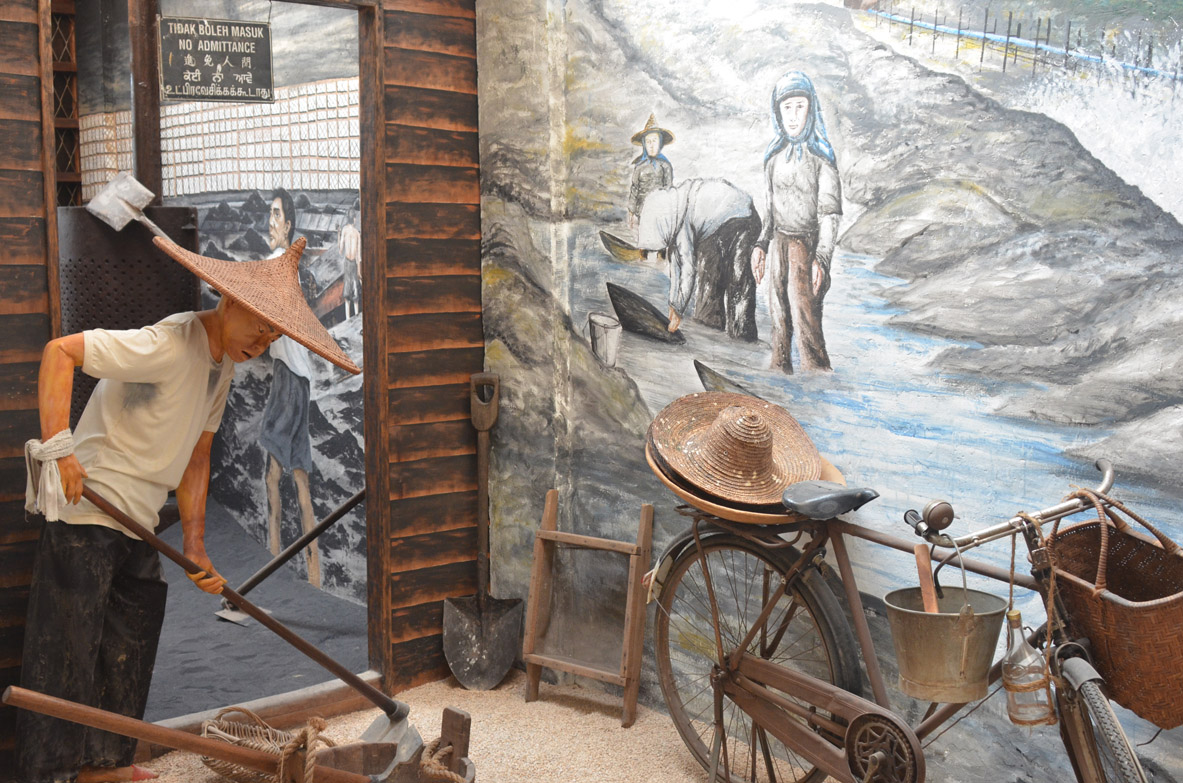

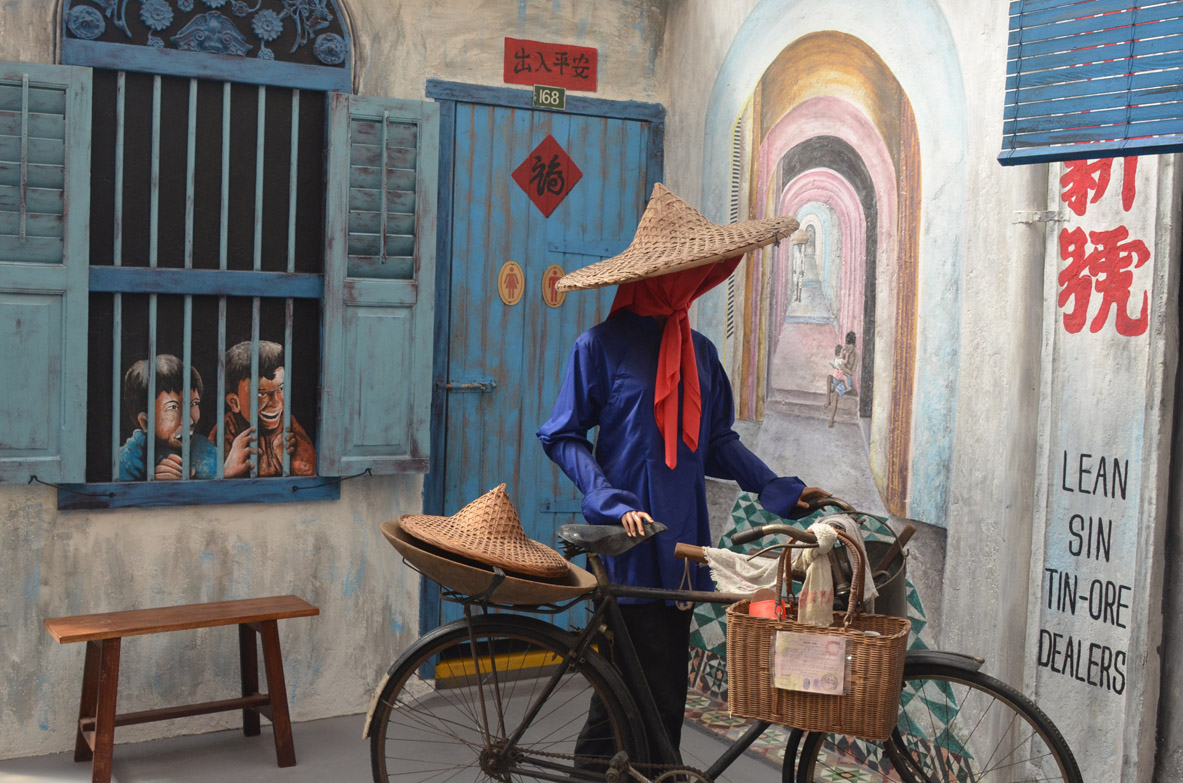

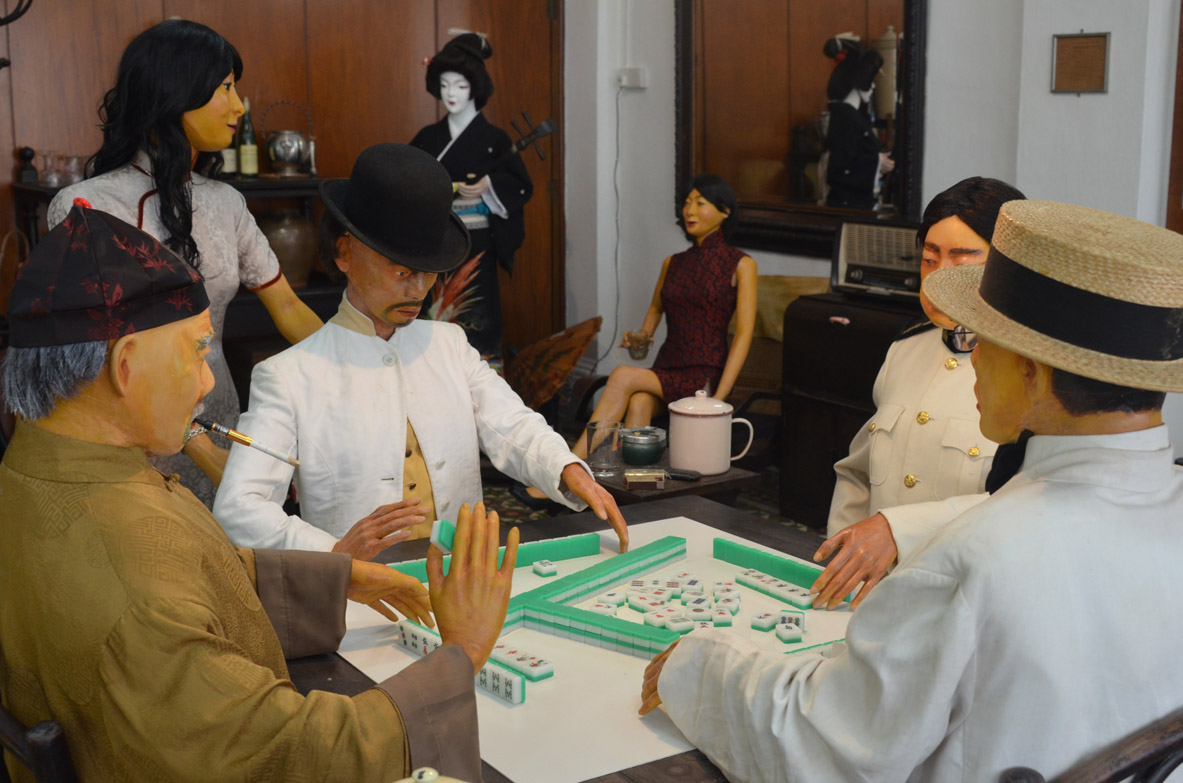
