= Kinta Valley =

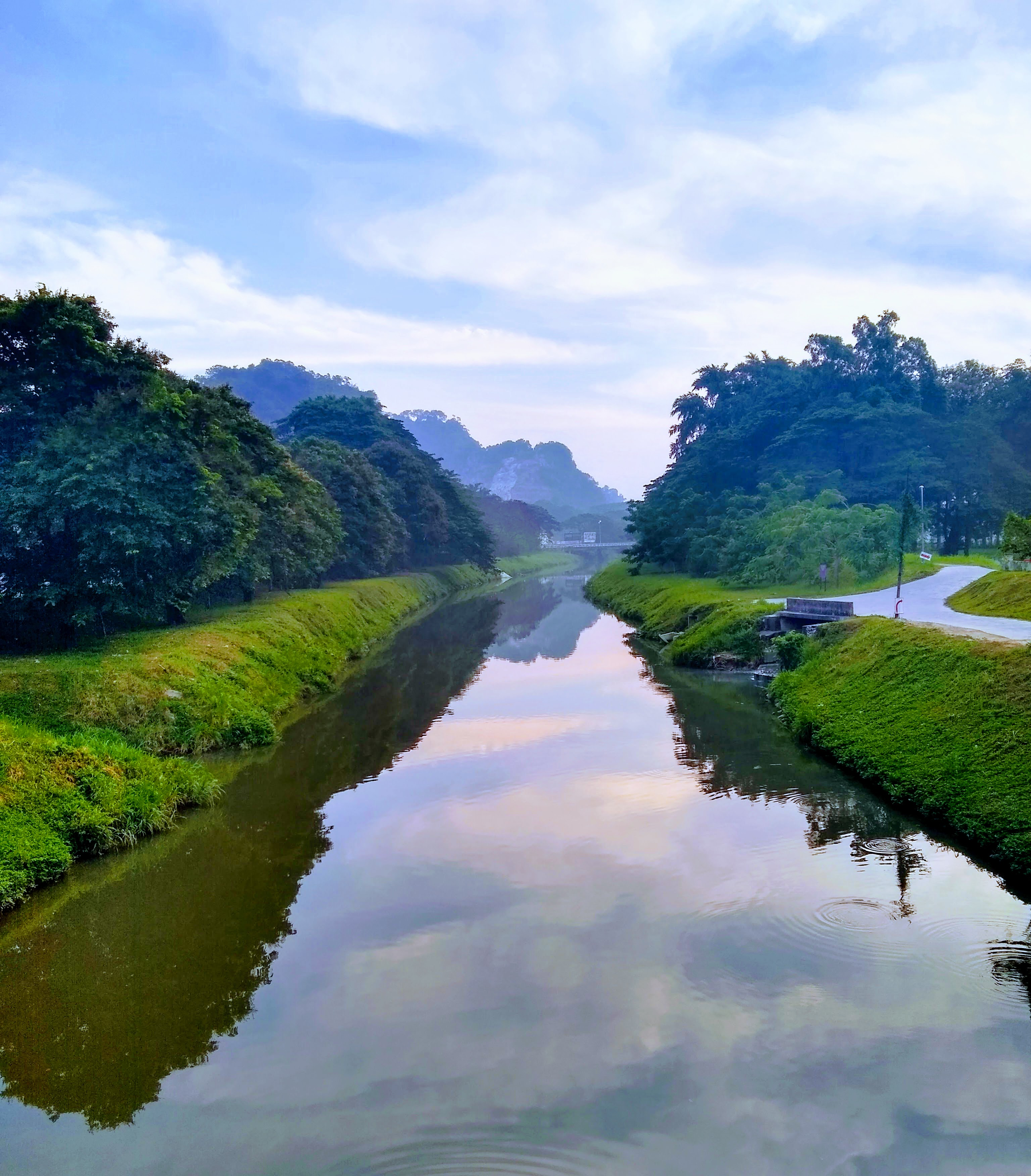
Kinta River

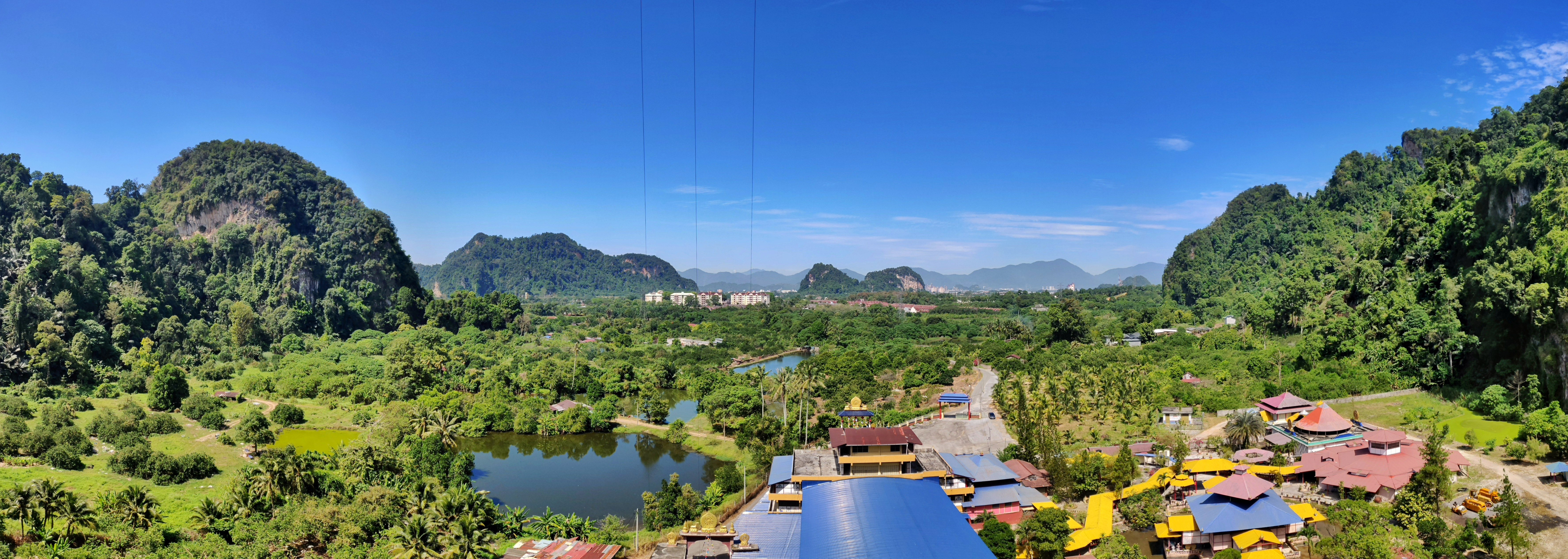
The Kinta Valley is karstic in nature, as shown by the prevalence of mogotes throughout the area. Taken near Tambun.

The Kinta Valley (Malay: Lembah Kinta) is a geographical feature and conurbation in central Perak, Malaysia, surrounding and including the state capital Ipoh. Historically, the Kinta Valley was very rich in tin, with mines that have been among the most productive in the world. The valley is formed by the Kinta River, a tributary of the Perak River, which flows between the Titiwangsa and Keledang Ranges.

It forms the largest tin field along the Siamese-Malayan peninsula tin belt. It has been mined since ancient times by indigenous peoples but was more intensively mined by the Chinese and Europeans from the end of the nineteenth century. Today, the modern Kinta district is one of the ten administrative districts of Perak. In 2018, the valley was declared Malaysia's second national geopark.

== Geographic definition ==
Kinta Valley Conurbation Konurbasi Lembah Kinta
- Metropolitan area
- Ipoh-Seri Iskandar-Lumut DPZ; ZPP Ipoh-Seri Iskandar-Lumut
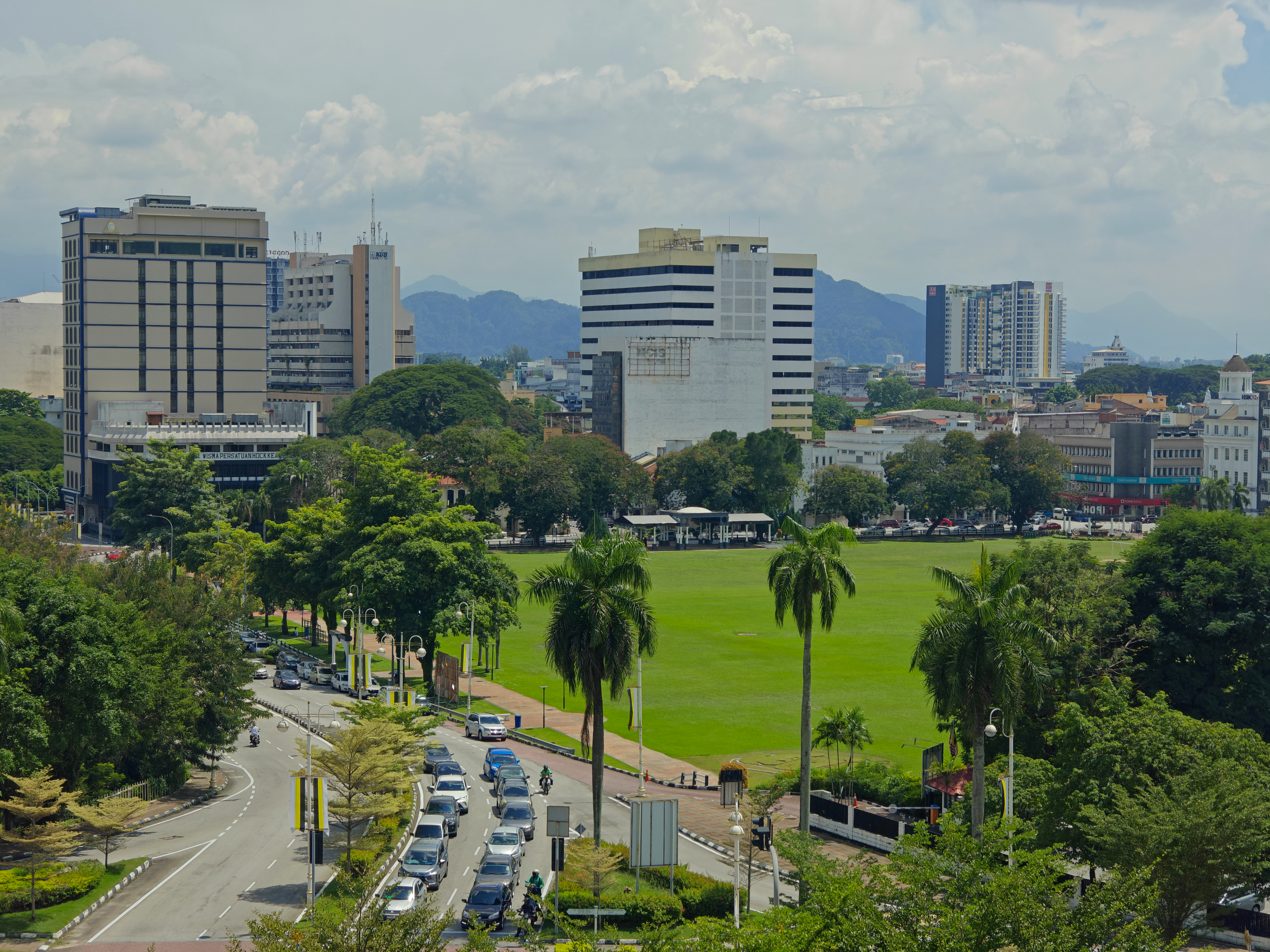
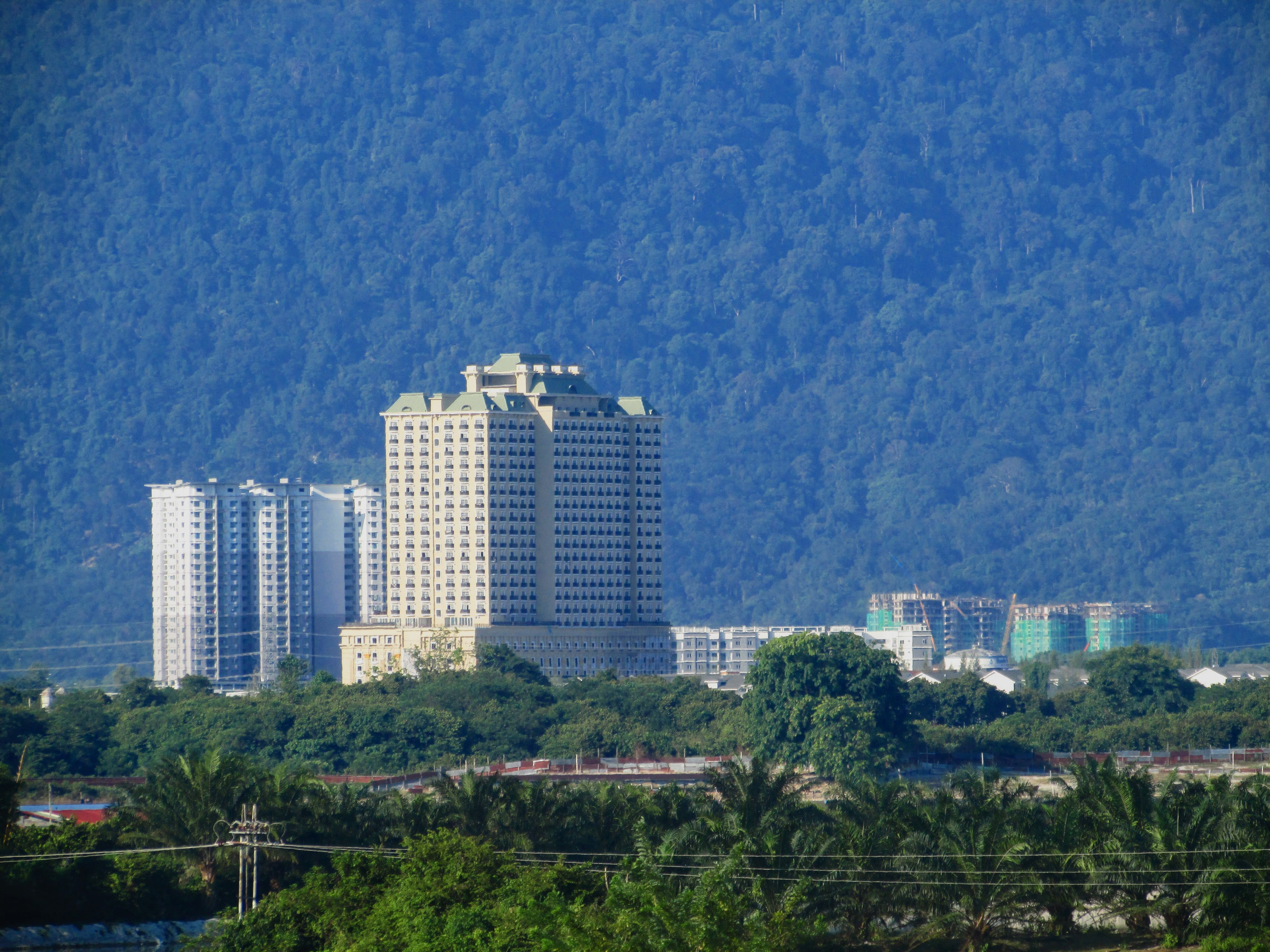
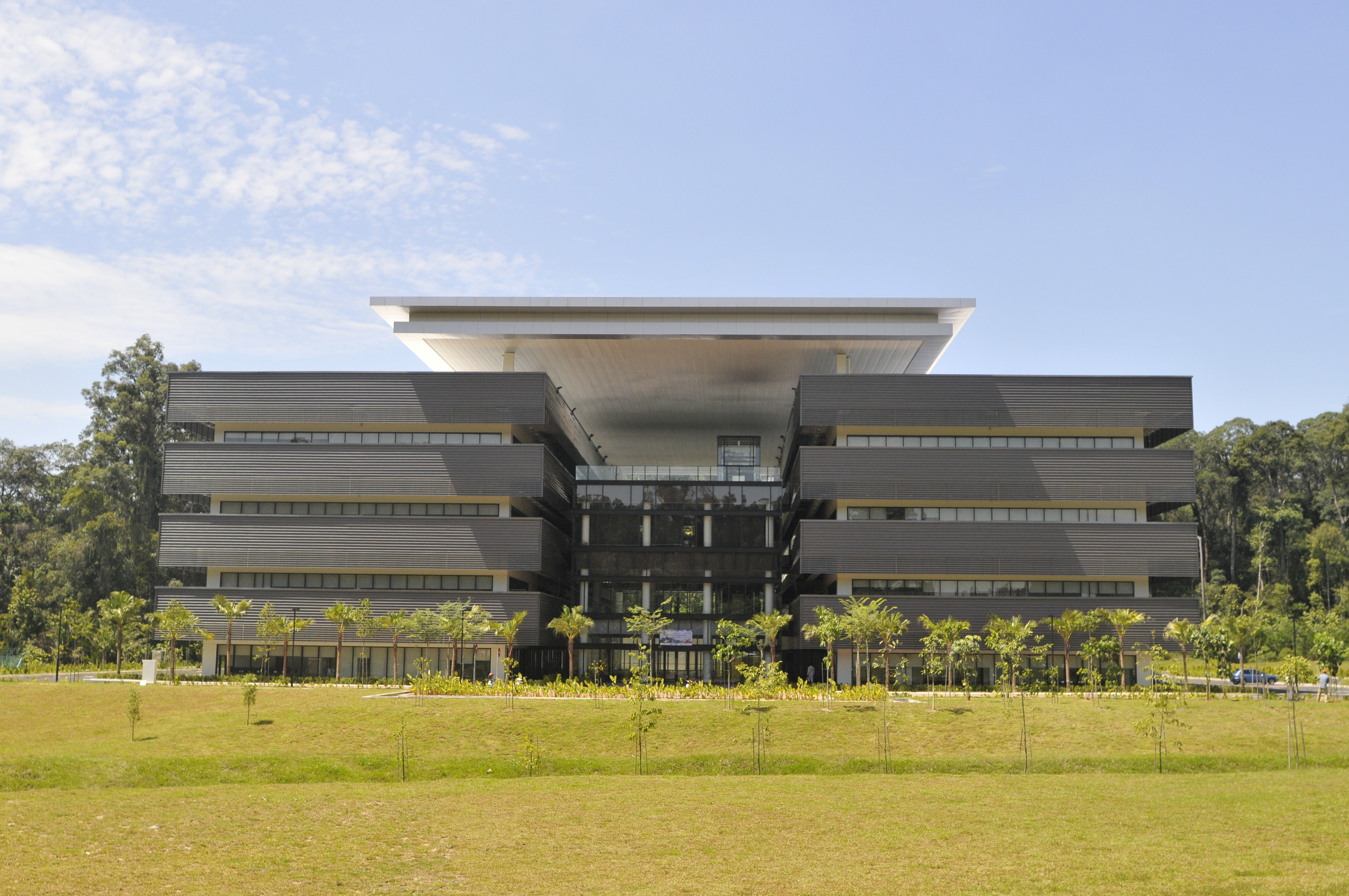
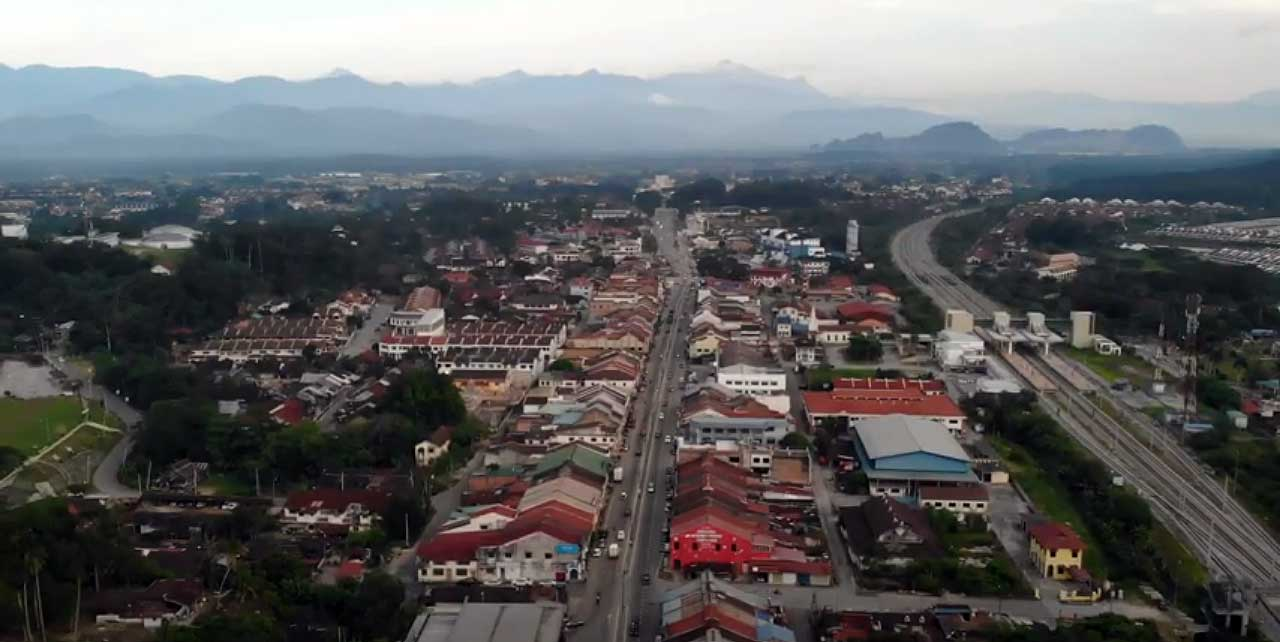
- Ipoh Kampar UTP, Seri Iskandar Sungai Siput
- Country: Malaysia
- State: Perak
- Districts: Kinta; Kuala Kangsar; Kampar; Perak Tengah; Manjung

Area
  - Total: 1,988 km^{2} (768 sq mi)

Population (2020)
  - Total: 1,282,460
  - Density: 495/km^{2} (1,280/sq mi)
- Time zone: UTC+8 (MST)

The Kinta Valley Conurbation is officially known as Ipoh-Seri Iskandar-Lumut Development Promotion Zone (Malay: Zon Promosi Pembangunan Ipoh-Seri Iskandar-Lumut) in the fourth National Physical Plan (NPP-4). Centred in the city of Ipoh, the metropolitan area spans all of Batu Gajah and Kampar, as well as parts of Kuala Kangsar, Perak Tengah and Manjung municipalities. As of 2020, Kinta Valley had a population of 1.28 million, making it the fourth largest metropolitan area in Malaysia.

City or town	Local government	Population
Ipoh	Ipoh City Council	759,952
Batu Gajah	Batu Gajah District Council	126,024
Kampar	Kampar District Council	97,216
Sungai Siput	Kuala Kangsar Municipal Council	62,856
Bota	Perak Tengah District Council	30,799
Seri Iskandar	Perak Tengah District Council	14,827
Ayer Tawar	Manjung Municipal Council	3,050
Damar Laut	Manjung Municipal Council	13
Pekan Gurney	Manjung Municipal Council	1,622
Lumut	Manjung Municipal Council	59,554
Sitiawan	Manjung Municipal Council	126,547
Kinta Valley Conurbation		1,282,460

== History ==
=== Early history ===
The Kinta Valley was occupied for thousands of years by the ancestors of the Orang Asli. Prehistoric remains include the Tambun rock art. The Kinta Valley has been visited for tin by Indian traders since ancient times. Buddhist bronze artefacts were excavated in Kinta in 1931.

=== Mining industry developments ===
An early method of indigenous mining was the Lombong Siam, meaning Siamese mines. Malay miners used ground sluicing or the lampan method by cutting ditches from the nearest river. In the nineteenth century, Mandailing migrants from Sumatra were observed using the tabuk mine, which is an excavated pit from which water is removed by cantilevered baskets.

The first tin rush to Kinta lasted from 1884 to 1889 where new land was taken up by Chinese miners using labour-intensive methods. Hailing from the farmlands of Guangdong, the Chinese mining workers at first used agricultural implements such as hoes, rakes and baskets to excavate the earth. The Chinese also introduced the water wheel to dewater the mines. The second tin rush lasted from 1889 to 1895, and was characterised by small gangs of tributers using the wooden sluice box (lanchut kechil). Around the turn of the twentieth century, two of the most famous large Chinese mines were the Tambun Mines, owned by Leong Fee, and Tronoh Mines, owned by Foo Choo Choon. There were many successful Chinese miners too like Eu Tong Sen, Chop Thai Lee, Chung Thye Phin, Au Moh Yi, Yau Tet Shin, Khi Ho Nin, Shak Yin Fuk, Lam Look Ing and Aw Kong. Up till the late twentieth century, Chinese women miners could be commonly observed panning tin with wooden trays (dulang) from stream-beds and tailing dumps of tin mines.

The longest operating European mine in the Kinta Valley was the French Société des Etains de Kinta better known as SEK, which started operating in 1886 and only closed down in 1985. Foo Choo Choon's Tronoh Mines was floated in London and became a European concern. Several opportunities arose for Osborne, founder of the Gopeng tin mining Company, who expanded his business by forming the famous professional partnership of Osborne & Chappell in 1901.

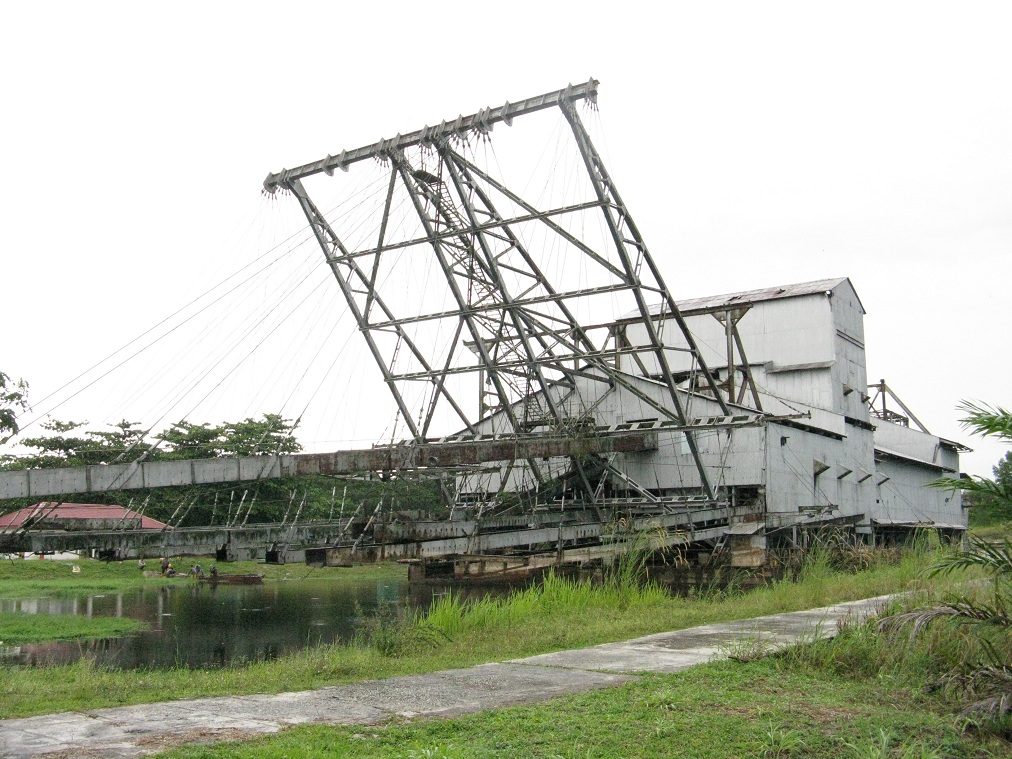
Tanjung Tualang No. 5 (TT5), a former dredge near Batu Gajah

In 1913, dredging was put into practice by Malayan Tin Dredging Ltd. (MTD), which later became the largest tin dredging company in the world. It had a significant impact on Kinta in terms of technological advancement. The bucket dredge was introduced and was the final breakthrough of the Malayan tin mining industry.

The last surviving dredge can be found at Batu Gajah along Jalan Tanjung Tualang. It belongs to Southern Malaya Tin Dredging.

=== Settlement and urban developments during colonial era ===
The tin mining boom ignited a rapid development of settlements, which grows into towns around Kinta Valley. The most significant was Ipoh, where it was developed with modern infrastructures such as railway station, court building, town hall, paved roads and post station, and with them, it became the centre for business and administration around the area. Ipoh rapid development lead to it being declared the new state capital of Perak, replacing Taiping on the north, and during its peak was the largest town of Federated Malay States. Other towns also started to grow around the valley such as Batu Gajah, Sungai Siput, Tronoh, Gopeng and Kampar, providing infrastructures and services for miners and other settlers living in those areas.

Meanwhile, Manjung, known as Dindings at that time was one of Perak main port, however due to Pangkor Treaty of 1874, it was absorbed into part of Straits Settlement colony of British. The ambition to turn it as a major harbour did not take off and eventually British returned it to Perak in 1934.

=== Modern development ===
The tin mining boom effect continues post-independence, with Ipoh being declared a municipal in 1962, one of the earliest for Malaya. It also leads to Ipoh declared as a city in 1988, the second post-independence after Kuala Lumpur. However, the tin mining decline stubbed many towns in the Valley, leaving Ipoh as the remaining active area due to it being a state capital and state business centre.

Perak explored other ways to develop the area, one of it is to attract universities to establish their campuses. This led to the establishing of Bandar Baru Seri Iskandar, west of the Tronoh mining area, to contain what would become the varsity town of Perak.Universiti Sains Malaysia and Universiti Teknologi MARA established their own branch campuses here, and later in 2001 the USM campus was reformed as Universiti Teknologi Petronas.

At the same time, Dinding, later renamed as Manjung received a major development with the establishment of Royal Malaysian Navy main Peninsular base in Lumut from 1980. Pangkor is also repurposed as a tourist attraction. In 1996, TNB established Malaysia's first clean-coal technology power station in Manjung, named as Sultan Azlan Shah Power Station.

To channel growth sharing between these areas, a new highway Ipoh–Lumut Highway was built in 2008 as a direct access between Ipoh and Manjung, including Seri Iskandar as part of its route.

In 2003, Universiti Tunku Abdul Rahman established its major branch campus in Kampar, reviving the town's growth.

== See also ==
- Geography of Malaysia

Metropolitan areas of Malaysia

- Greater Kuala Lumpur
  - Klang Valley
- George Town Conurbation
- Johor Bahru Conurbation
- Greater Kuching
- Greater Kota Kinabalu
