= Panglima Kinta Mosque =

Mosque in Perak, Malaysia

- Masjid Panglima Kinta مسجد ڤڠليما كينتا
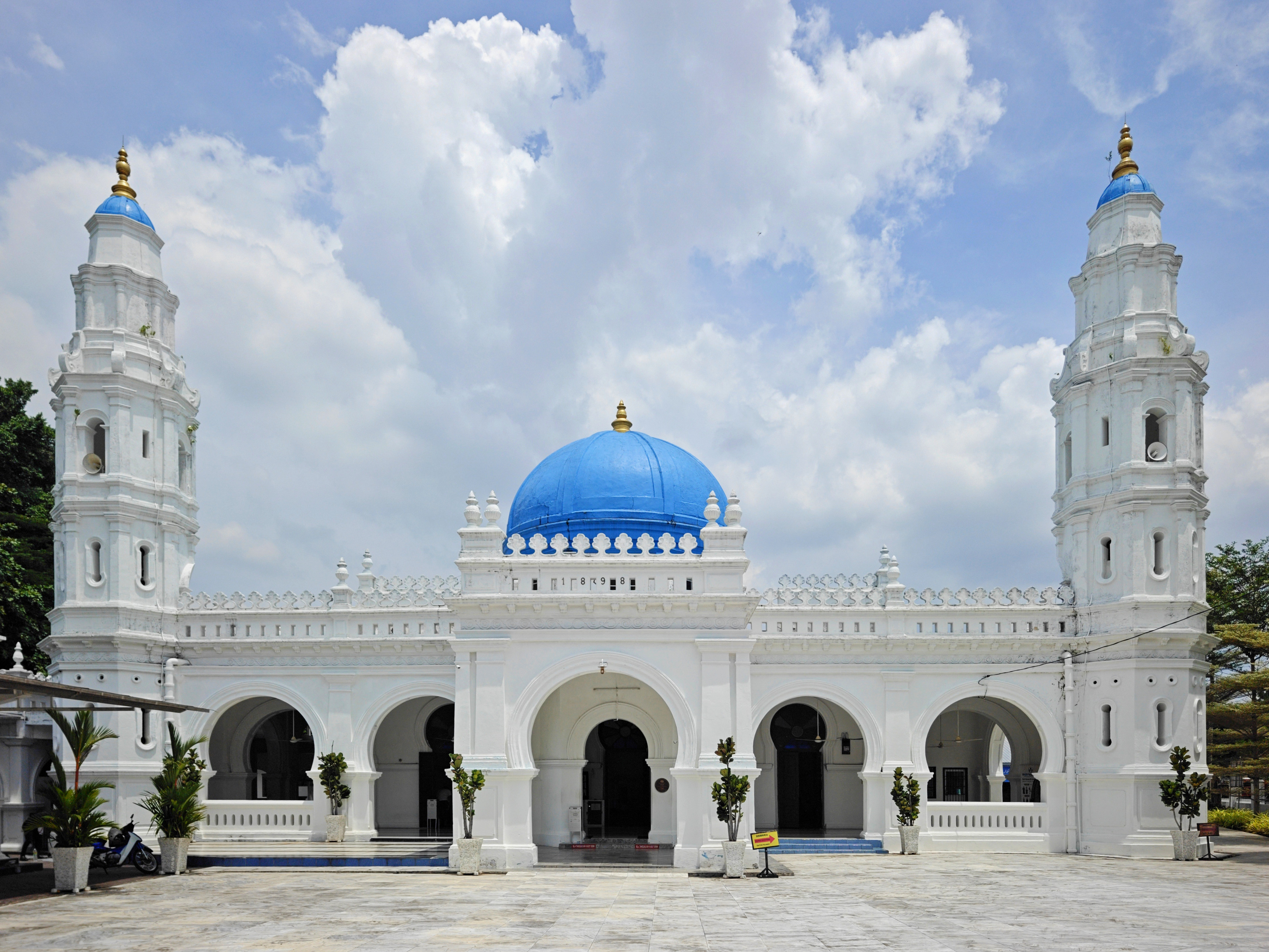

- Location of the mosque in Perak.

Religion
- Affiliation: Islam
- Branch/tradition: Shafi'i
- Status: Active

Location
- Location: Ipoh, Perak, Malaysia 4°35′36.2724″N 101°4′50.5302″E

Architecture
- Style: Colonial; Neoclassical; Mughal
- Completed: 1898
- Minaret: 2

Panglima Kinta Mosque (Malay: Masjid Panglima Kinta) is a mosque located in the city of Ipoh, Perak, Malaysia. The mosque was built in 1898 by Datoh Panglima Kinta Muhamad Yusuff bin Lassam, who was then Panglima Kinta or Lord of Kinta, as a commemoration for his wife, Saaidah bt Chik, who died in the same year. Panglima Kinta Mosque was gazetted as a heritage building in 2012.

== History ==
The mosque complex was built on a 45,000-square-foot land near the Kinta River at a cost of $15,000. It used to be a centre for the spreading of Islam among the local community.

After a few years, there were several additions, namely a burial area for the family members of Panglima Kinta and a madrasah for study classes within the mosque area. This was followed by the addition of the ablution (wudu) area, balai lintang (a hall at the right side of building), cemetery, and house for mosque officials.

Reportedly, an ustaz from Egypt, Shaik Tholji, used to live here and contributed to teaching the locals to study the Quran. After his death, he was buried in the family mausoleum of Datuk Panglima Kinta, which is located in the backyard of the mosque.

This mosque was gazetted as a heritage building in 2012 by the National Heritage Department.

== Architecture ==
The main materials used in the construction of Panglima Kinta Mosque were bricks and lime plaster, which was finished in white paint and strokes of blue lines.

Sporting a colonial design mixed with Mughal and Neoclassical motifs (based on Roman and Greek designs), the mosque was built in a rectangular form, approximately 40 metres in length and 25 metres in width. The prayer hall is distinguished by a square shape enclosed with a two-tiered pyramid as roof.

It has a front porch and is flanked by two minarets. Its roofline is crenellated, which is a popular feature of Mughal architecture. Semicircular arches support the porch and front verandah. Cupola crown the minarets which are divided into five sections to symbolise the Five Pillars of Islam.

The prayer hall can accommodate 400 people at the most, while an additional 200 people can use the corridors at peak hours, especially during the Friday Prayer.

== Gallery ==
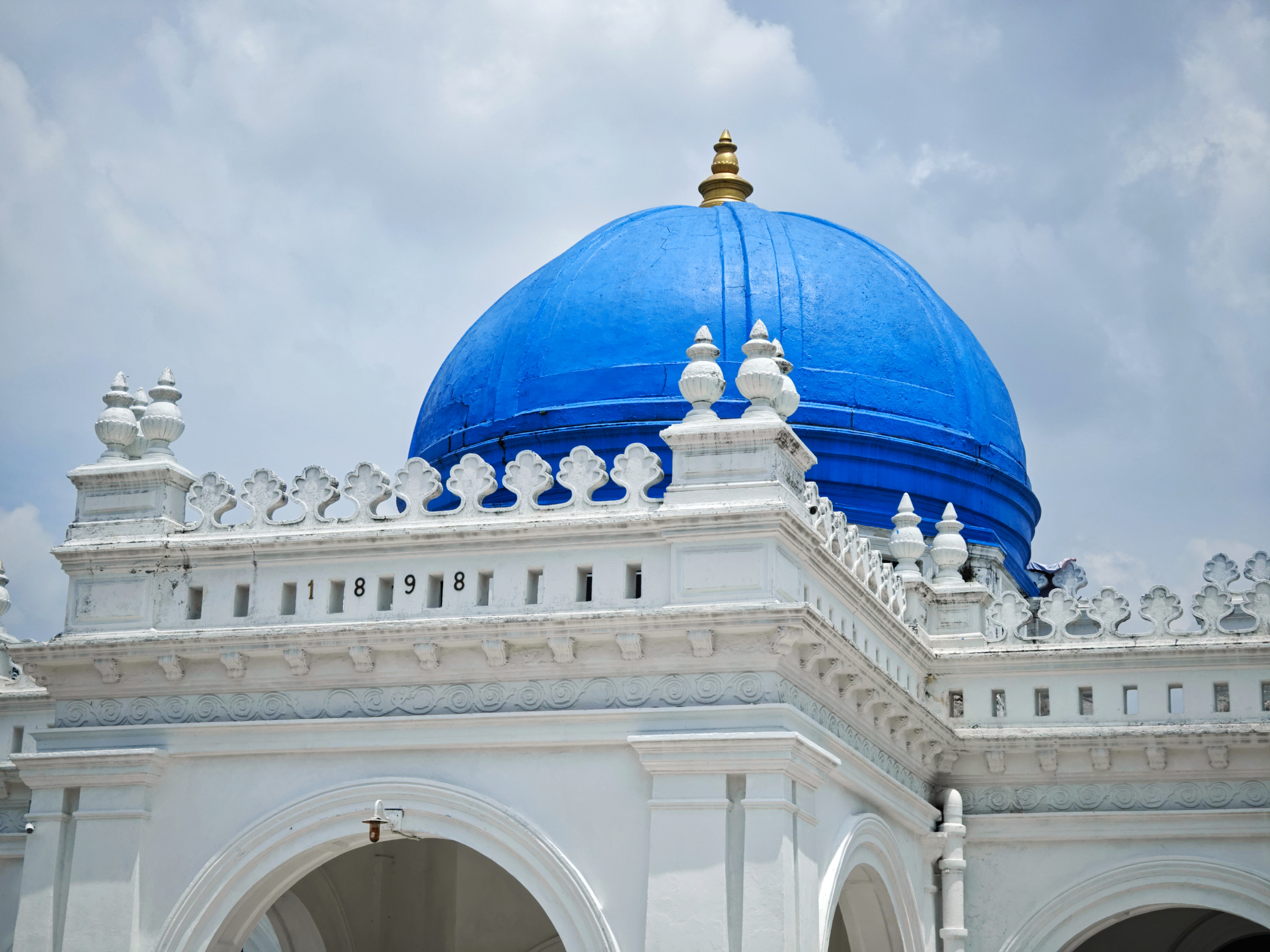
The mosque was built in 1898

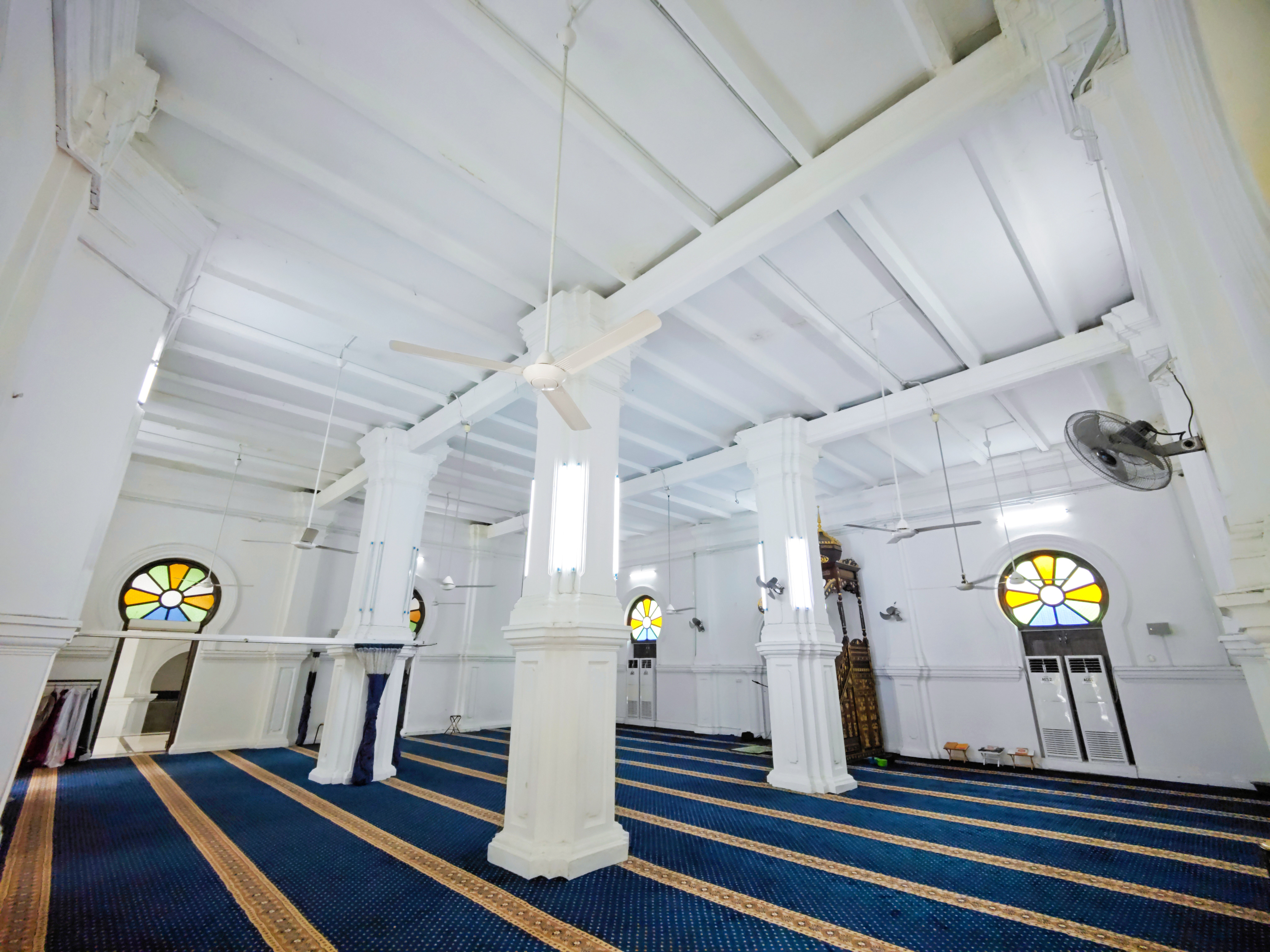
The mosque's pulpit was built in 1928

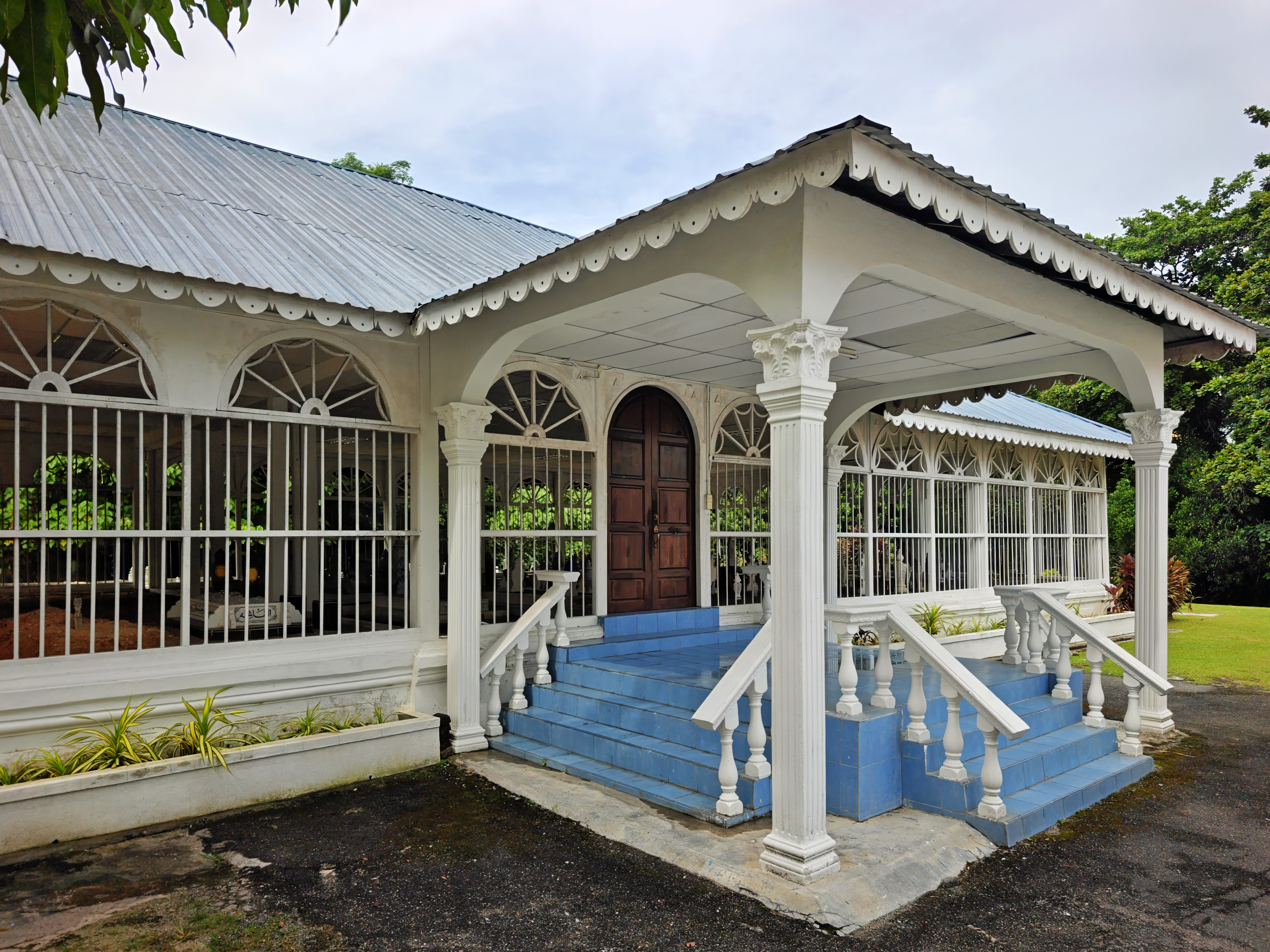
The family mausoleum is located in the backyard

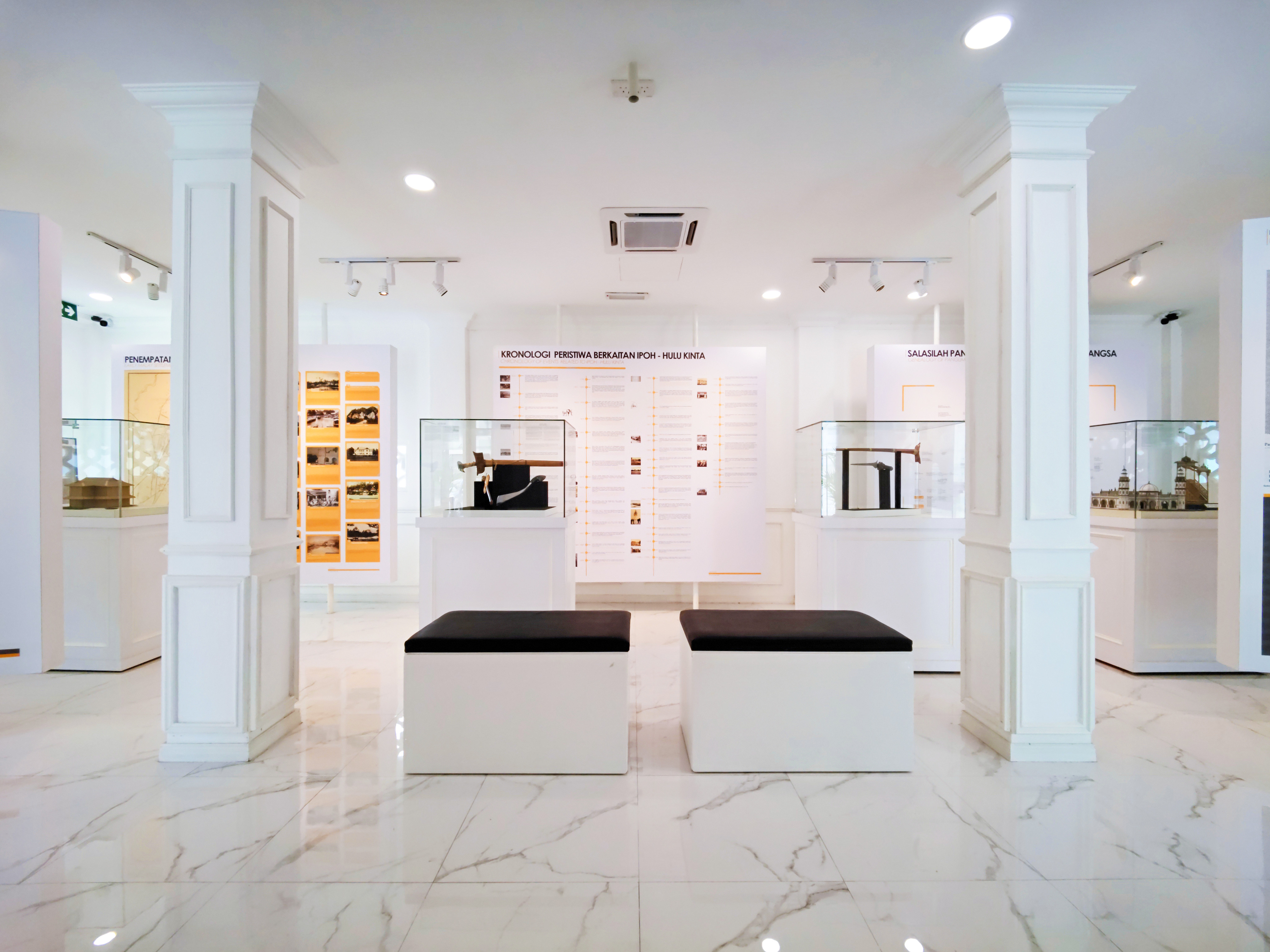
Museum of Ipoh history

== See also ==
- Islam in Malaysia
- Islam in Southeast Asia
