= Perak Chinese Chamber of Commerce =

Chamber of commerce in Malaysia

To promote relationships and cooperation among the Chinese business community within the state, and to safeguard, uphold and fight for their economic rights, miners, Mr. Foo Choo Choon and Yau Tuck Seng led a group of businessmen to form the Perak Chinese Chamber of Commerce in 1907.

Perak Chinese Chamber of Commerce and Industry ( PCCCI ), formerly known as Perak Chinese Chamber of Commerce, was founded in 1907 as a society under the law.

The chamber currently has 1276 trade society members, and more than 10,000 individual, corporate and trade society members.

The Chamber also hosted the Annual General Meeting of The Associated Chinese Chambers of Commerce and Industry of Malaysia in Years 1970, 1979, 1995 and 2003 respectively.

== Perak Chinese' Representative To China's Parliament ==
In 1912, the strong support of the Chinese of Perak for China's 1912 Xinhai Revolution entitled them to be represented at the National Assembly in Peking. After Foo Choo Choon, who was unanimously voted to that position, turned down the honour, elections were held at the Perak Chinese Chambers, the voters being made up of those who had contributed significantly to the Chinese Patriotic Fund. Chinese Journal Chung Sin Pau's former editor, Tien Toon resident in China who was well connected in Ipoh was eventually chosen when all local nominees, over 1,000 tin miners and businessmen, realised that no one wanted to take time off to attend meetings at Peking.

== China's Financial Crisis of 1912 ==
Foo Choo Choon as head of the Perak Chinese Chamber of Commerce, representing the Perak Chinese community, initiated a fund raising drive to help address the financial crisis in China at that time.
