= Kinta River =

River in Perak, Malaysia

Coordinates: 4°05′40″N 101°00′45″E

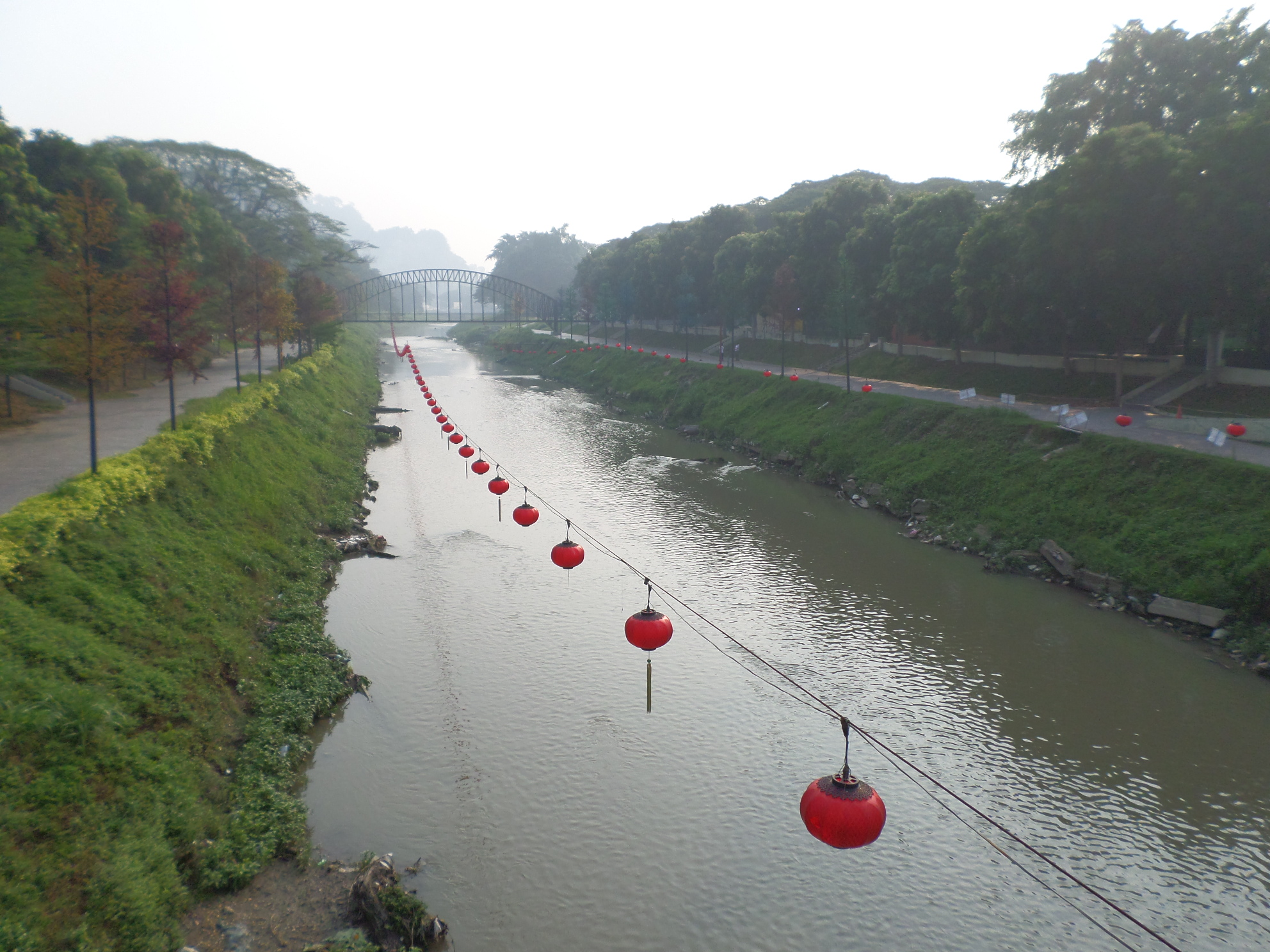
- Kinta River, Ipoh
- Native name: Sungai Kinta (Malay)

Location
- Country: Malaysia
- State: Perak

Physical characteristics
- Source: Titiwangsa Mountains
  - location: Ulu Kinta, Kinta District
- Mouth: Perak River
  - location: near Teluk Intan, Hilir Perak District
- Length: 100 km (62 mi)
- Basin size: 2,540 km^{2} (980 sq mi)

Basin features
- Progression: Perak > Strait of Malacca

Kinta River (Malay: Sungai Kinta) is a river in Perak, Malaysia. It gets its name from the Kinta Valley, which surrounds Ipoh, the capital of Perak. Ipoh sits along this river. There are many limestone hills in the area surrounding the river, and there used to be many tin mines. The supposedly largest tin field in the world was discovered in 1876 in the Kinta Valley. The river was also well known for its wide variety of freshwater fish. The fisheries department reported a greater abundance of fish from in the river stretch from the Intake Dam to Tasek, and from a secluded fish pool, 0.75 miles (1.21 km) down from Tanjung Rambutan. Fishing in this area used to be a major local activity until the fisheries gradually closed down.

Kinta River is one of the main tributaries of the Perak River.

== Major settlements ==
Major settlements along the river are:

- Sungai Siput
- Ipoh
- Pusing
- Batu Gajah
- Gopeng
- Teronoh
- Kampar
- Tanjung Tualang

== See also ==
- Kinta Valley
