= Teronoh =

Tronoh
- Town in Malaysia

Other transcription(s)
  - Jawi: ترونوه
  - Chinese: 端洛
  - Tamil: துரோனோ
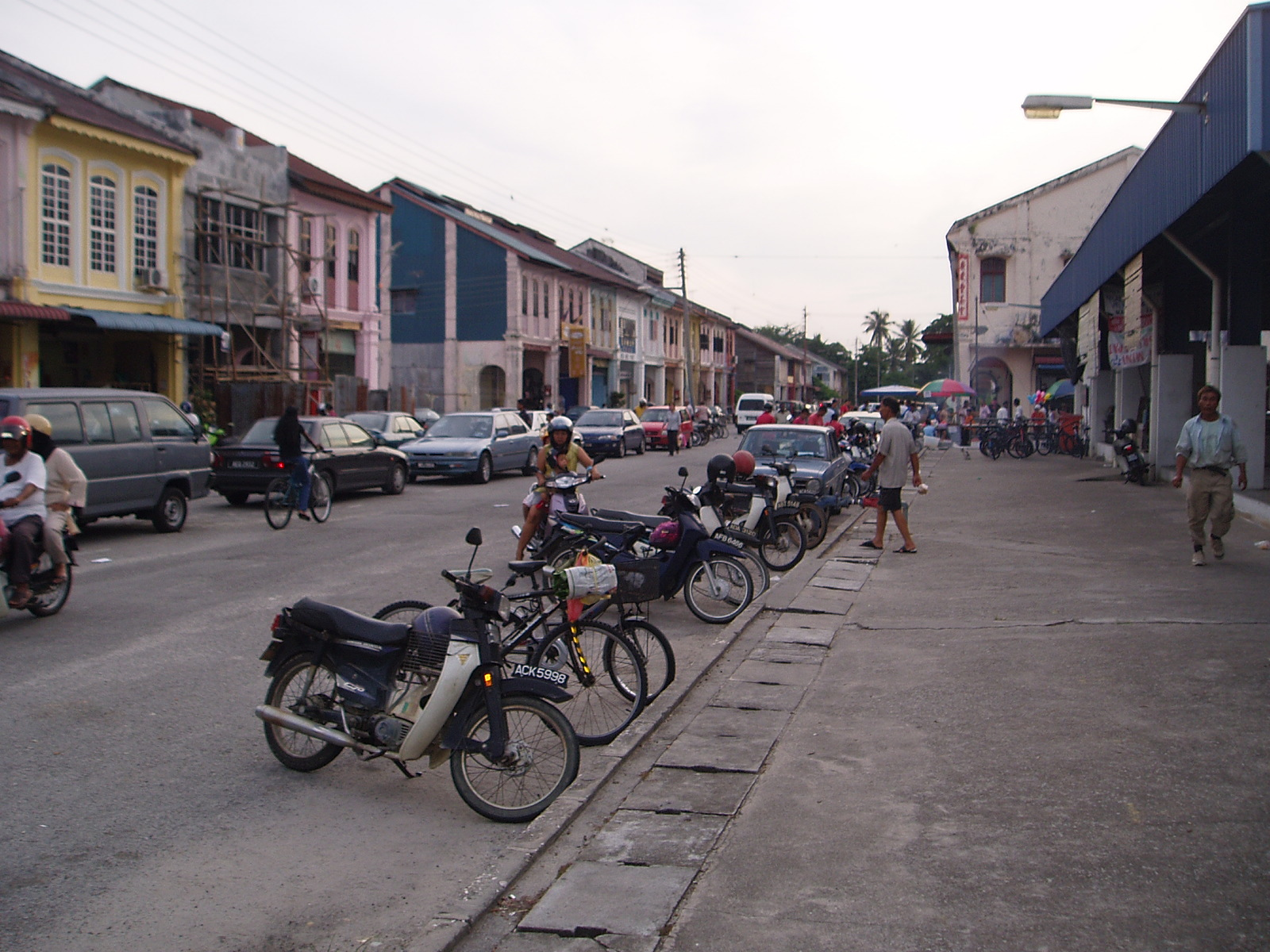
- Tronoh

- Tronoh in Perak, Malay Peninsular and Malaysia Tronoh (Peninsular Malaysia) Tronoh (Malaysia)
- Coordinates: 4°25′21.91″N 100°59′35.36″E
- Country: Malaysia
- State: Perak
- District: Kinta
- Time zone: UTC+8 (MYT)
- Postal code: 31750

Tronoh (or Teronoh, Ternoh) (Jawi: ترونوه; Chinese: 端洛; Tamil: துரோனோ) is a small tin-mining town in Kinta District, Perak, Malaysia.

The town was said to have been founded by the Minangkabau of Talu, a village located in present-day West Pasaman, Sumatra; the community erected a surau taruno in which young men would be expected to be housed while starting their own families, which Tronoh would be named after. The tin-mining industry boom during the early 20th century saw Tronoh, believed to be an old settlement, grow from a small village into a major town. The mines in the area included Teronoh South Ltd., Tronoh Extended Ltd., Chung Thye Phin's Phin Tak Mine (also known as the Phin Tak Kongsi) and Chia Tek's Lee Yeoh Mine, all of which were acquired by Foo Choo Choon's Tronoh Mines Ltd. between 1912 and 1921.

A railway line linking the town and Ipoh was completed in 1909 and used to transport tin ore. The tracks were dismantled by the Japanese during World War II and were never rebuilt. Shortly after the war ended the tin industry deteriorated, and with it, the importance of the town.

The main road that used to cut through town linking Ipoh with the seaside town of Lumut has been replaced by a new highway bypassing the town. Today Teronoh is a sleepy little town although that may change giving that two universities (Universiti Teknologi Petronas and Universiti Teknologi MARA) are in the vicinity.
