= Foo Choo Choon =

Malaysian businessman (1860–1921)

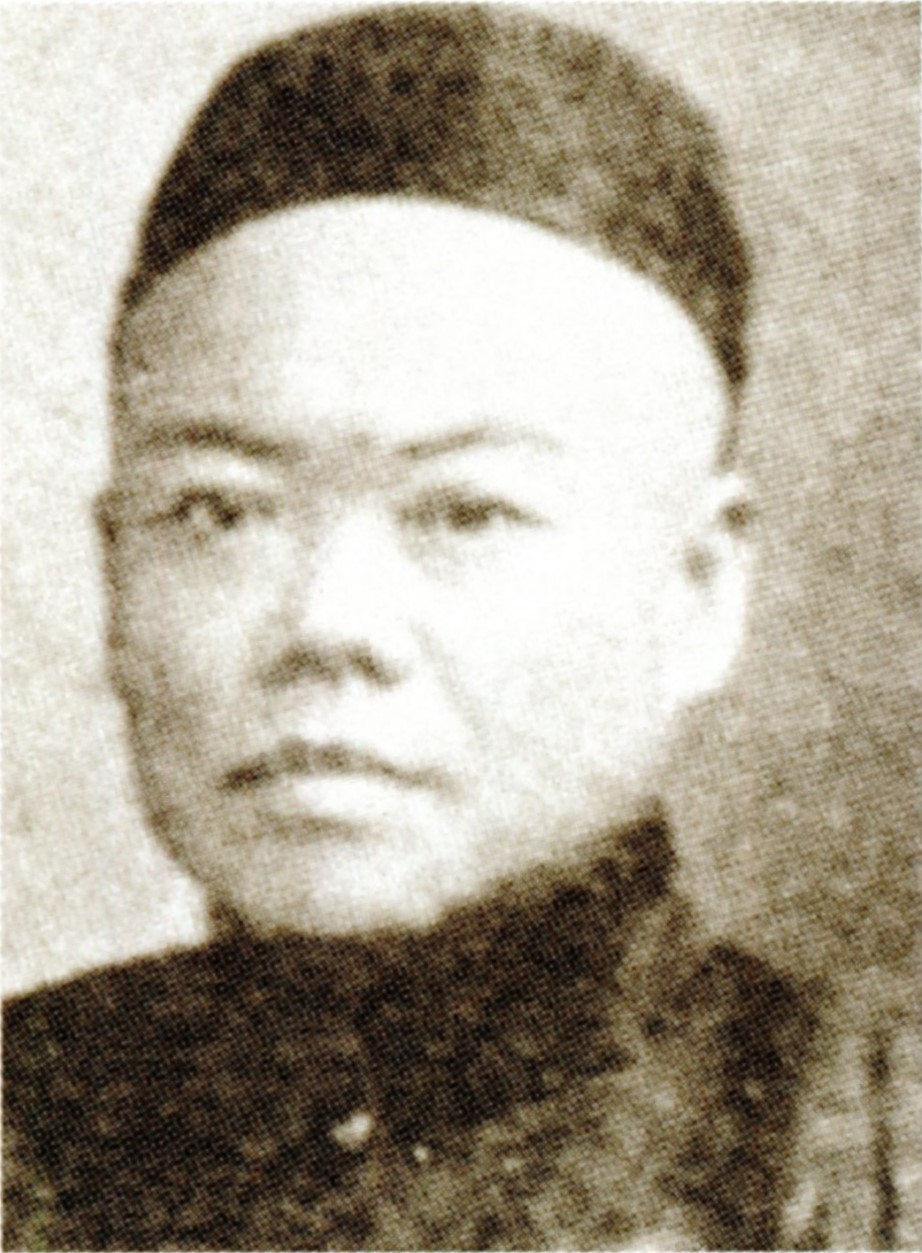
- Born: 30 July 1860; Yongding, Fujian, Qing Dynasty
- Died: 27 March 1921 (aged 60); Penang, Straits Settlements
- Occupations: Tin miner, revenue farmer and businessman
- Spouse: Chung Siew Lian (郑绣莲) (Chung Keng Quee's niece)
- Children: 3 (Foo Meow Chin (胡茂菁), Foo Meow Ying (胡茂英), Foo Meow Wong (胡茂煌))
- Father: Foo Yu Chio (胡玉池)

Foo Choo Choon (Chinese: 胡子春; pinyin: Hú Zichūn; 30 July 1860 – 27 March 1921), a Hakka tin miner, revenue farmer and businessman from Penang and Perak was, in his time, said to have been the richest Chinese man in the world.

Foo was called the "Tin King" and "the Carnagie of the Orient".

== Early life ==
Foo's ancestral home was in Yongding, Longyan, south west of the Fujian province in China. Foo's grandfather moved to Penang and Foo's father, Foo Yu Chio (Chinese: 胡玉池; pinyin: Hú Yùchí; 30 July 1860 – 27 Mar 1921) was born there. However, Foo was born in Yongding on 30 July 1860.

At thirteen years old, Foo accompanied his father to Malaya, where he studied at Penang and worked at his uncle's mines in Perak.

== Career ==
Foo later started his own business and moved to Kinta and eventually Lahat.

In the late 1880s, Foo returned to China for medical attention. On returning to the Malay Federated States, Foo sublet land originally granted to Chung Keng Quee, father of Chung Thye Phin. This, one of his first ventures, was the Tronoh Mine and he installed modern machinery for mining. The company was then floated in London and the mines eventually proved profitable.

In 1904, Foo opened one of the largest opencast mines in the country, worked by Sungei Besi Mines Ltd, previously owned by Kapitan Cina Yap Kwan Seng. He had a mine in Southern Thailand, known as Tongkah.

Foo sat on the board of directors of the Eastern Shipping Company, Ltd., one of nine joint-stock companies registered in Penang in 1907, whose members also included the Khaw family, Quah Beng Kee (b. 1872), and Cheah Choo Yew.

Foo was also a director of the Kledang Mines, Ltd., The Ipoh Foundry, Ltd., and of the Tanglin Rubber Syndicate, besides owning several estates. He employs some 10,000 coolies.

In 1935, with Choo Kia Peng as partner, Foo established Tong Hin Company.

He once hosted the geologist R.A.F. Penrose, as Penrose notes in his letters.

On 9 September 1906, he was made a president of the Penang Chinese Town Hall. In 1913 he was elected as a president of Perak Chinese Chamber of Commerce in and appointed to both the Perak State Council and Perak Chinese Advisory Board.

Foo founded the Perak Mining and Planting Association, the Chinese Maternity Hospital and the Chinese Girls' School at Ipoh, and the Mandarin School at Lahat. He is a member of the committee of King Edward VII School, Taiping, and is a patron in the Perak Anti-Opium Society.

He was well connected through his business networks, his seats on social, commercial and political councils and bodies.

== Civil career ==
Foo was president for the Straits Settlements and the Federated Malay States of the Chinese Board of Education; of the Pinang Anti-Opium Society; and of the Chinese Widows and Orphans' Association, Ipoh.

== Political career ==
Foo was also a member of the State Council of Perak and of the Chinese Advisory Board for that State.

== Philanthropy ==
On returning to China, Foo encounter a famine and built and supplied several public granaries. He established schools in his native district and donated the revenue of his property in China to poor scholars preparing for the Imperial examinations.

Foo and partner Loke Yew defrayed the total cost of the Anglo-Chinese School, Ipoh, in 1904. Rev W. E. Horley, founder of the school, said of him, "In 1905, Mr. Foo Choo Choon, one of the most enlightened Chinese towkays in Malaya, built the present Primary Hall and presented it as a gift to the School. I have never met a finer type of a Chinese gentleman than he and it was mainly due to his and Mr. Cheah Chiang Lim's exertions that a monster petition was presented to the Government asking for the suppression of licensed gambling houses."

When due to an increase in student enrolment, Rev. Pykett wanted to expand the Anglo Chinese School, Penang, Foo, together with two other benefactors donated $6,000 for the purchase of a site at Maxwell Road on 16 April 1895 (See History of Methodist Boys' School). To that school also he endowed a well selected library. Together with Cheong Fatt Tze and Leong Fee, he founded the Chung Hua School, Penang.

Foo had also contributed largely by instituting and maintaining many Chinese and English schools in the Federated Malay States.

== Honours ==
Foo received the honorary title of magistrate, with the additional privilege of wearing peacock feathers, from the Chinese Government for his generosity during the Shantung famine. He was promoted to the rank of Taotai and then to the Commissioner of the Salt Revenue.

Foo was also recognised as one of the most advanced Chinese in educational reform in the Federated Malay States.

In 1906, Guangxu Emperor, by special command, ordered the former Viceroy of Liangguang Cen Chunxuan to confer on Foo the Order of Merit for his services to his country. The decoration, together with a gold medal, was sent from China and presented by a special envoy, Cheah Cheang Lim, who was Foo's cousin as well as his attorney.

== Personal life ==
Foo is a naturalised British subject, and is a Fellow of the Society of Arts of England.

Through marriage, Foo was connected to Chung Keng Quee and Chung Thye Phin, fellow tin magnates and revenue farmers.

== Legacy ==
To honor his legacy, the road Jalan Foo Choo Choon in Ipoh, Perak is named after him.

== See also ==
1. London Gazette Notices To Creditors Re Liquidation of Foo Choo Choon Mining Companies
2. London Gazette Notices To Creditors Re Appointment of Liquidators Re Liquidation of Foo Choo Choon Mining Companies
3. London Gazette Notices To Creditors Re Notice of Claims Re Liquidation of Foo Choo Choon Mining Companies
4. London Gazette Notices Re General Meeting For Liquidators to Present Report to Members of the company Re Liquidation of Foo Choo Choon Mining Companies
5. London Gazette Notices Re Winding Up of Foo Choo Choon Mining Companies
6. Malaysia; Nature's Wonderland By William Fitzjames Oldham, Wm. F. Oldham Published by Eaton and Mains, 1907; p. 45
7. Journal of Oriental Studies, v.20-21 (1982–83), By University of Hong Kong Institute of Oriental Studies Published by Hong Kong University Press, 1982; p. 240
8. Generations: The Story of Batu Gajah By Tak Ming Ho, Perak Academy, Published by HO TAK MING, 2005; ISBN 983-40556-5-X, ISBN 978-983-40556-5-3, pp. 105, 117, 119, 169
9. Memoir, no.9, By Malaya Geological Survey Dept, British Territories Borneo, Geological Survey Dept, Published by Sarawak; p. 178
10. The Deposits of the Useful Minerals and Rocks: Their Origin, Form and Content By Franz Heinrich August Beyschlag, Franz Heinrich August Beyschlag, 1856-, Johan Herman Lie Vogt, Franz Beyschlag, Paul Krusch, Samuel John Truscott Published by Macmillan and Co., 1914; p. 441
11. The China Quarterly By China Institute of International Relations, Shanghai, China Quarterly Co. Shanghai, Institute of Social and Economic Research, Shanghai, Pan-Pacific Association of China, Shanghai Published by China Quarterly Co.; p. 250
12. The China Journal: Zhongguo Ke Xue Mei Shu Za Zhi, v.26 1937 Jan-Jun, By China Society of Science and Arts, China Society of Arts and Science Published by The China Journal Pub. Co., 1937; p. 187
13. The Directory & Chronicle for China, Japan, Corea, Indo-China, Straits Settlements, Malay States, Siam, Netherlands India, Borneo, the Philippines, &c (version 1899), Published by The Hong Kong Daily Press Office, 1899; p. 502
14. Journal of the Society of Arts (v.50) By Society of Arts (Great Britain) Published by The Society, 1902; p. 461
15. History of English Schools in Perak By E. C. Hicks, Compiled by E. C. Hicks, Contributor E. C. Hicks Published by Perak Library, 1958; p. 6
16. Who's who in the Far East, 1907–08 and 1906–07, Published by China Mail, Hong Kong, 1907; p. 51
17. 兩次世界大戰期間在亞洲之海外華人 By Chiyan Zheng, Chak-Yan Chang, Nixia Wu Lun, Lun Ngai-ha Ng Published by Chinese University of Hong Kong, 1989; p. 422
18. Doctors Extraordinaire By Tak Ming Ho Published by HO TAK MING, 2000 ISBN 983-40556-0-9, ISBN 978-983-40556-0-8; p. 220
19. Mining in Malaya for Gold and Tin By Charles George Warnford Lock Published by Crowther and Goodman, 1907; 190
20. Journal of Tropical Medicine, v.6 (1903), Published by John Bale Sons & Danielsson., 1903; p. 347
21. The Mandarin-Capitalists from Nanyang: Overseas Chinese Enterprise in the Modernisation of China 1893-1911 By Michael R. Godley Contributor Patrick Hannan, Denis Twitchett, Published by Cambridge university press, 2002; ISBN 0-521-52695-7, ISBN 978-0-521-52695-1
22. Chinese Business in the Making of a Malay State, 1882-1941: Kedah and Penang By Wu Xiao An, Xiao An Wu Published by RoutledgeCurzon, 2003; ISBN 0-415-30176-9, ISBN 978-0-415-30176-3
