= Leong Fee =

Malaysian businessman

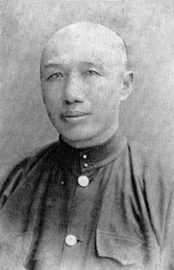
- Leong Fee
- Born: Liang Pi Joo; 1857; Guangdong in China
- Died: 1912
- Occupation(s): Tin miner, businessman, politician
- Known for: Held the world record for tin production; First Chinese Member of the Federal Legislative Council

Leong Fee (simplified Chinese: 梁辉; traditional Chinese: 梁輝; pinyin: Liáng Huī; Hakka Pha̍k-fa-sṳ: Liòng Fî) is the Hakka name for Liang Pi Joo (1857–1912), a worker from Guangdong in China who emigrated to Malaya in 1876.

== Career ==
He arrived in Penang and, half a year later, moved to Perak where he began to make his fortune in tin. He was a tin miner, businessman, a visiting Justice for Kinta (1892), the first Chinese Member of the Federal Legislative Council (1909) a Penang state senator, a member of the Perak State Council, a Chinese Vice-Consul to Penang (1902 to 1908) and a philanthropist. He was a member of the Society for the Encouragement of Arts, Manufactures and Commerce.

In 1902 he opened a mine in Tambun. Renowned Malaysian businessman Leong Sin Nam once worked in his tin mine. One year later Tambun held the world record for tin production.

== Leong Fee Mansion ==
Built on Leith Street around the 1900s as a personal residence, it now belongs to the Christian Brothers and has been leased to an art school, Akademi Seni Equator.

== Hakka Chinese Tin Miners Club ==
Leong Fee founded the club in Ipoh in 1893. His son, Leong Yin Khean alias Liang En-Chuen, continued to sponsor the lodge after his father's death in 1912 and eventually sold the house cheaply to the club. He was a member of the Society for the Encouragement of Arts, Manufactures and Commerce.

== Personal life ==
He married the daughter of millionaire-philanthropist Hsieh Yung-kuan, the Chinese Vice-Consul to Penang before him.
