= Malacca City =

- State capital city
- City of Malacca Bandaraya Melaka (Malay)
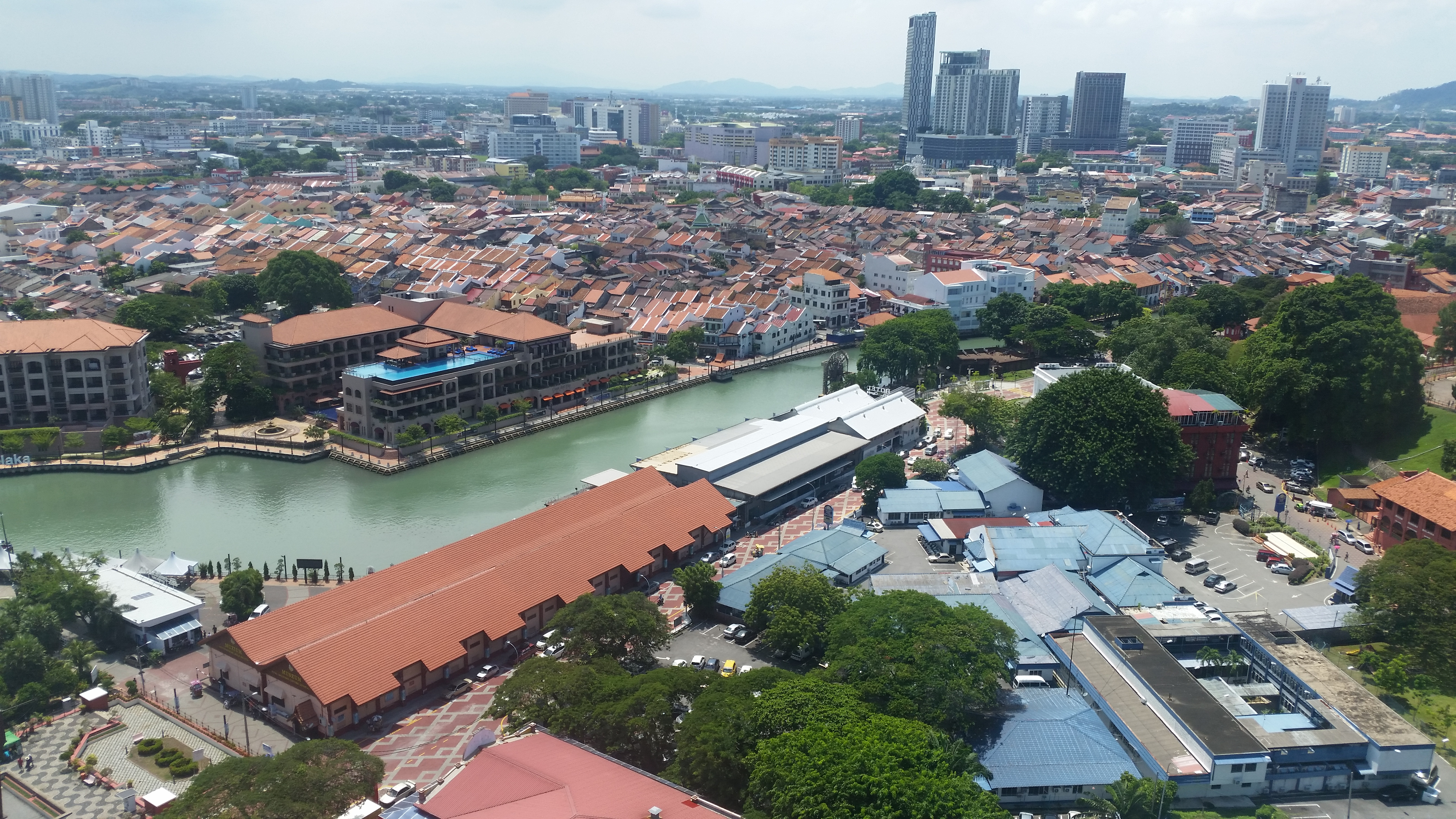
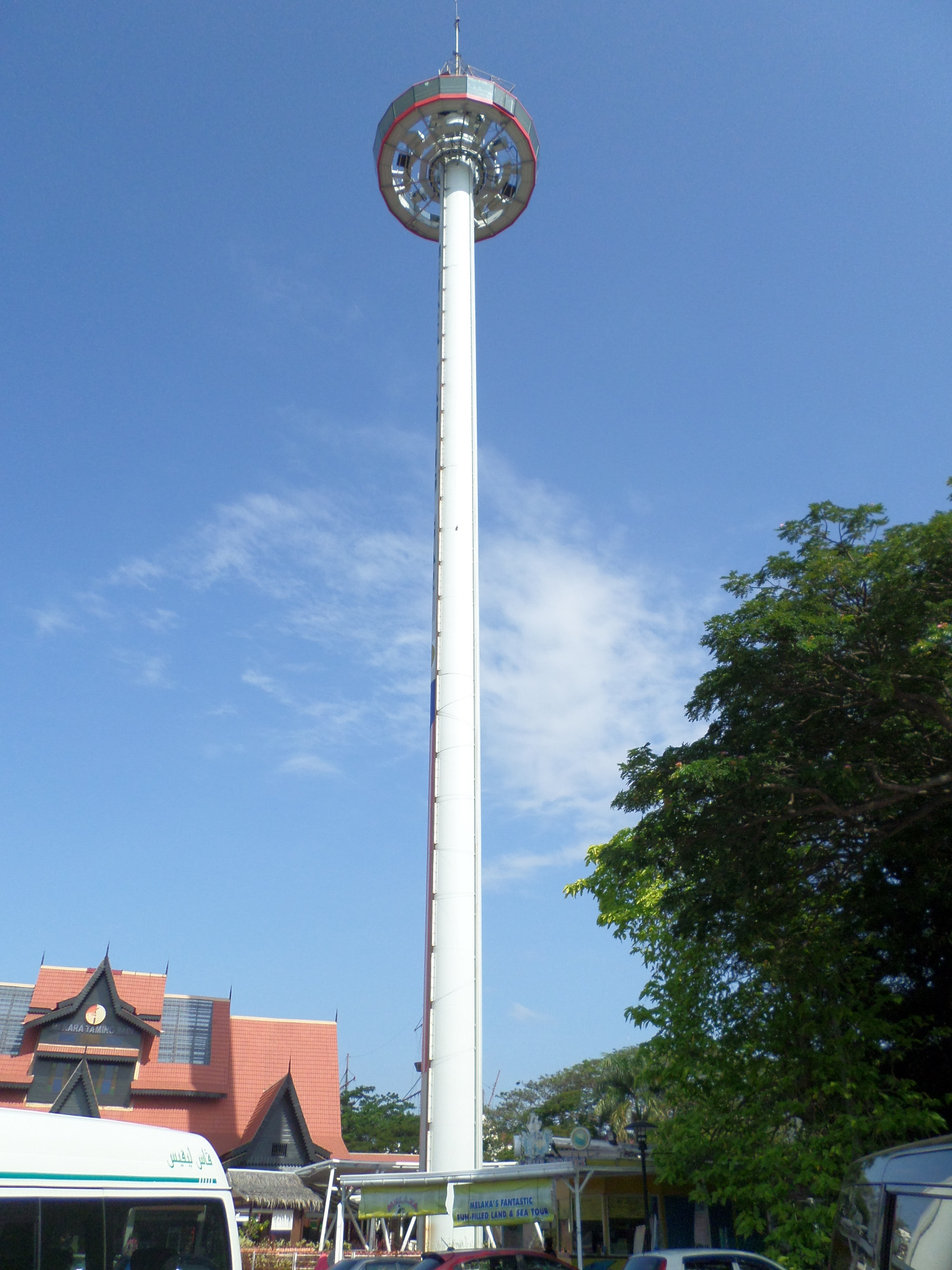
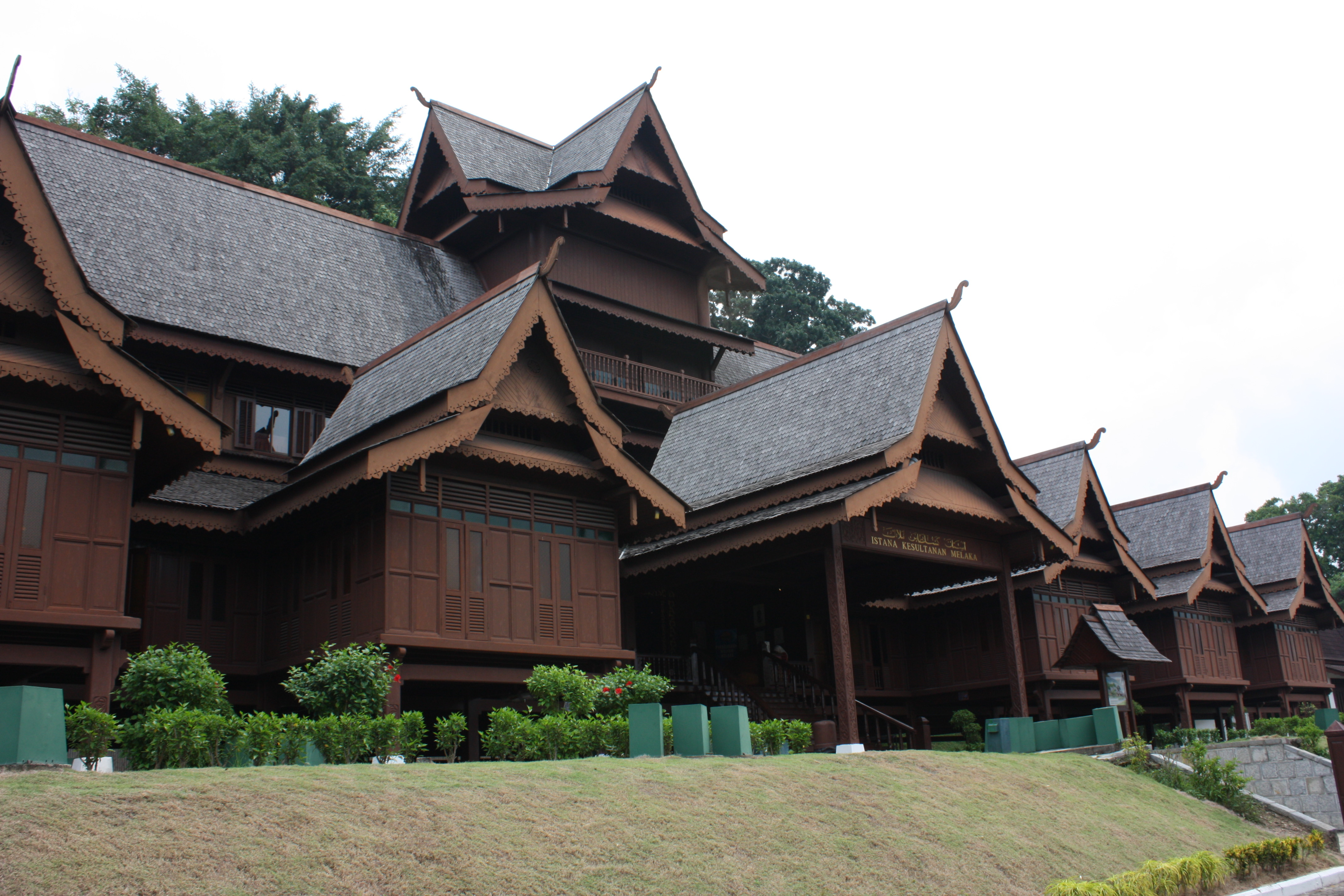
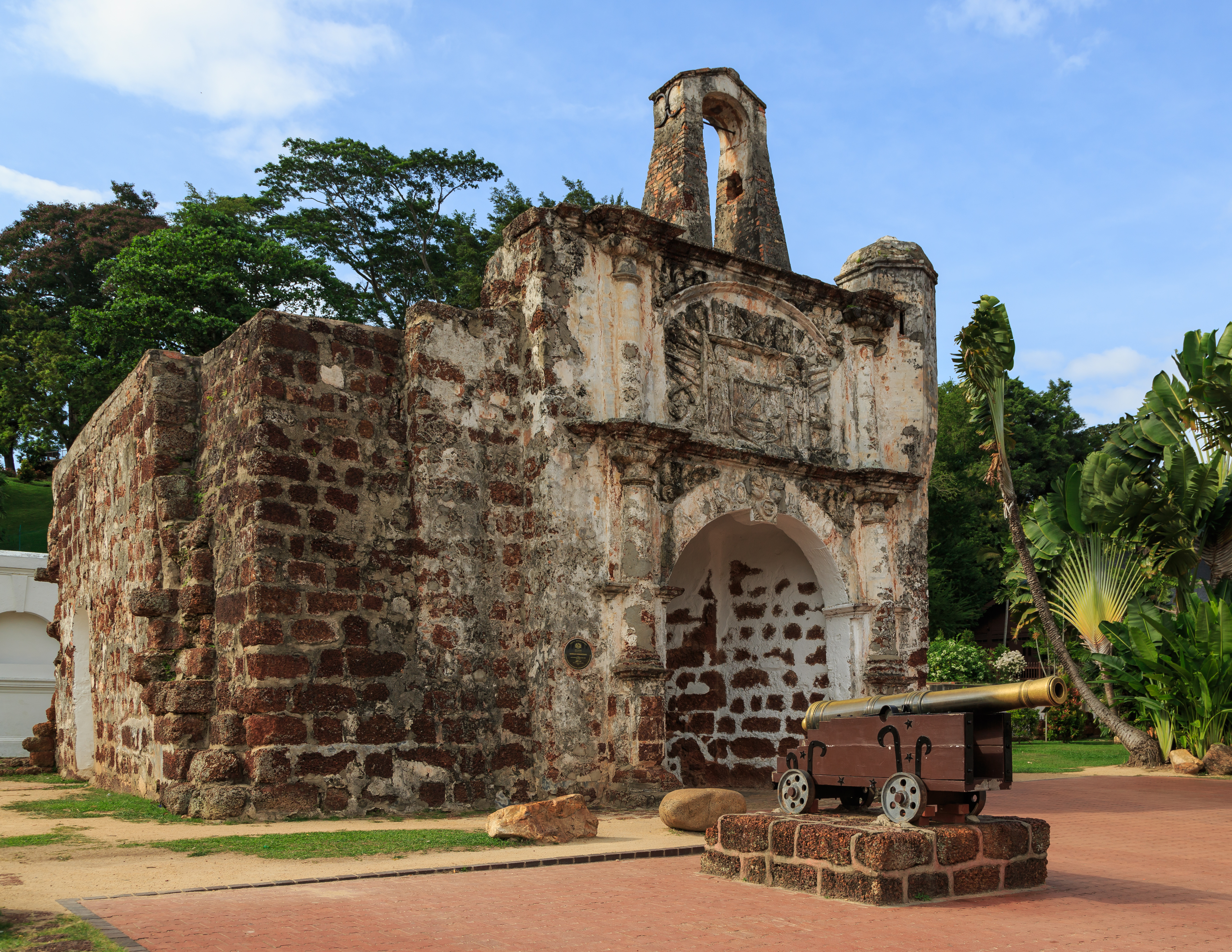
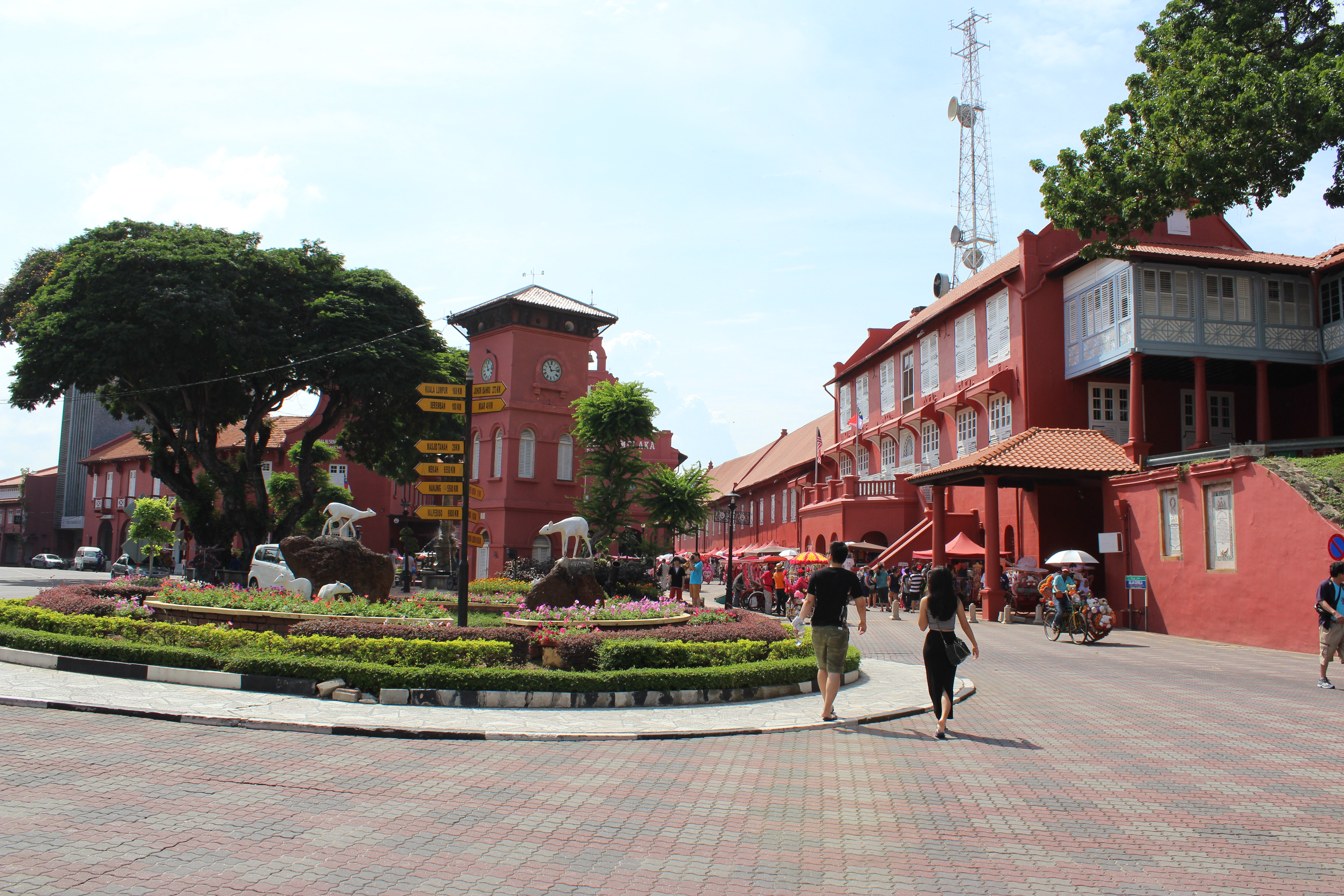
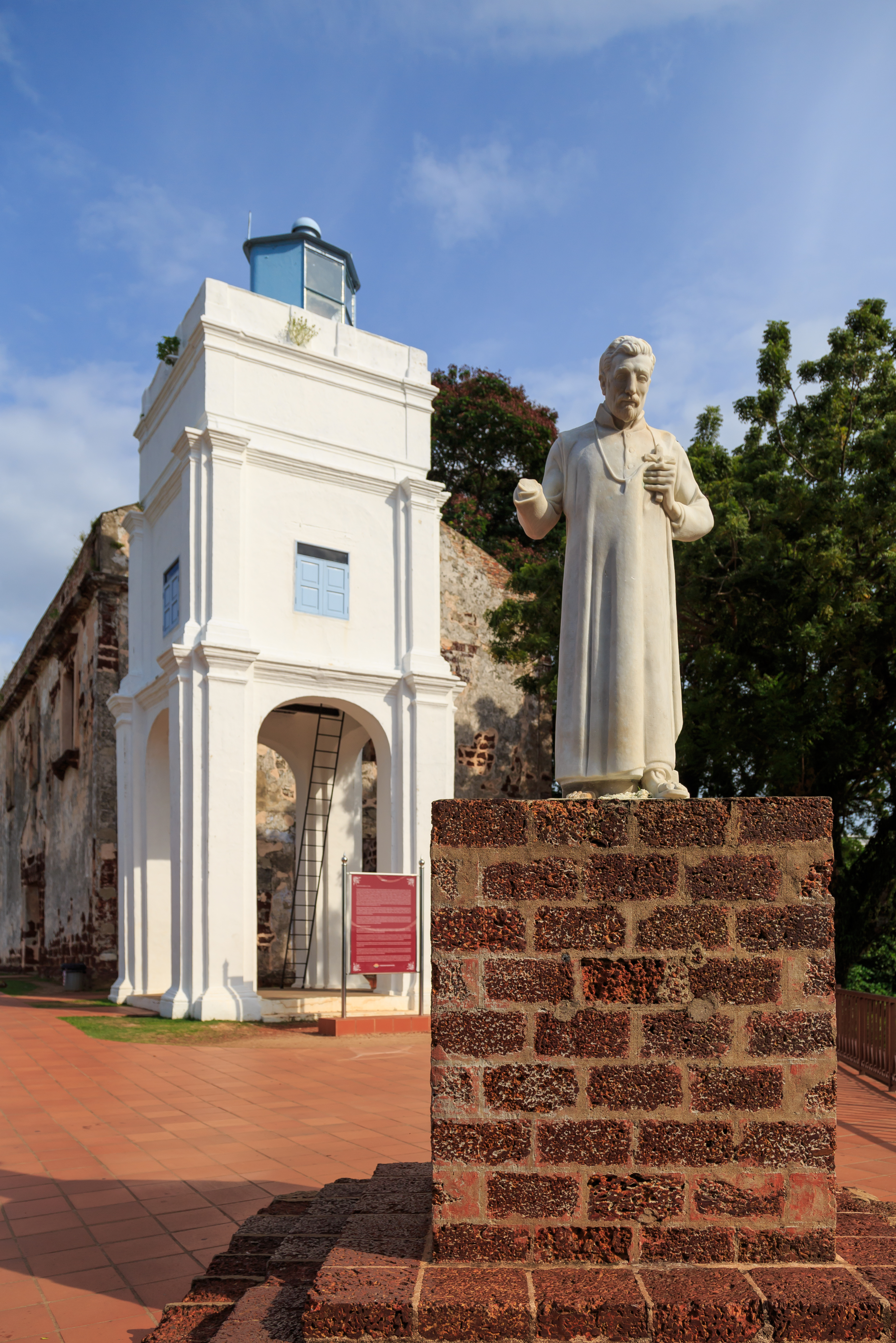
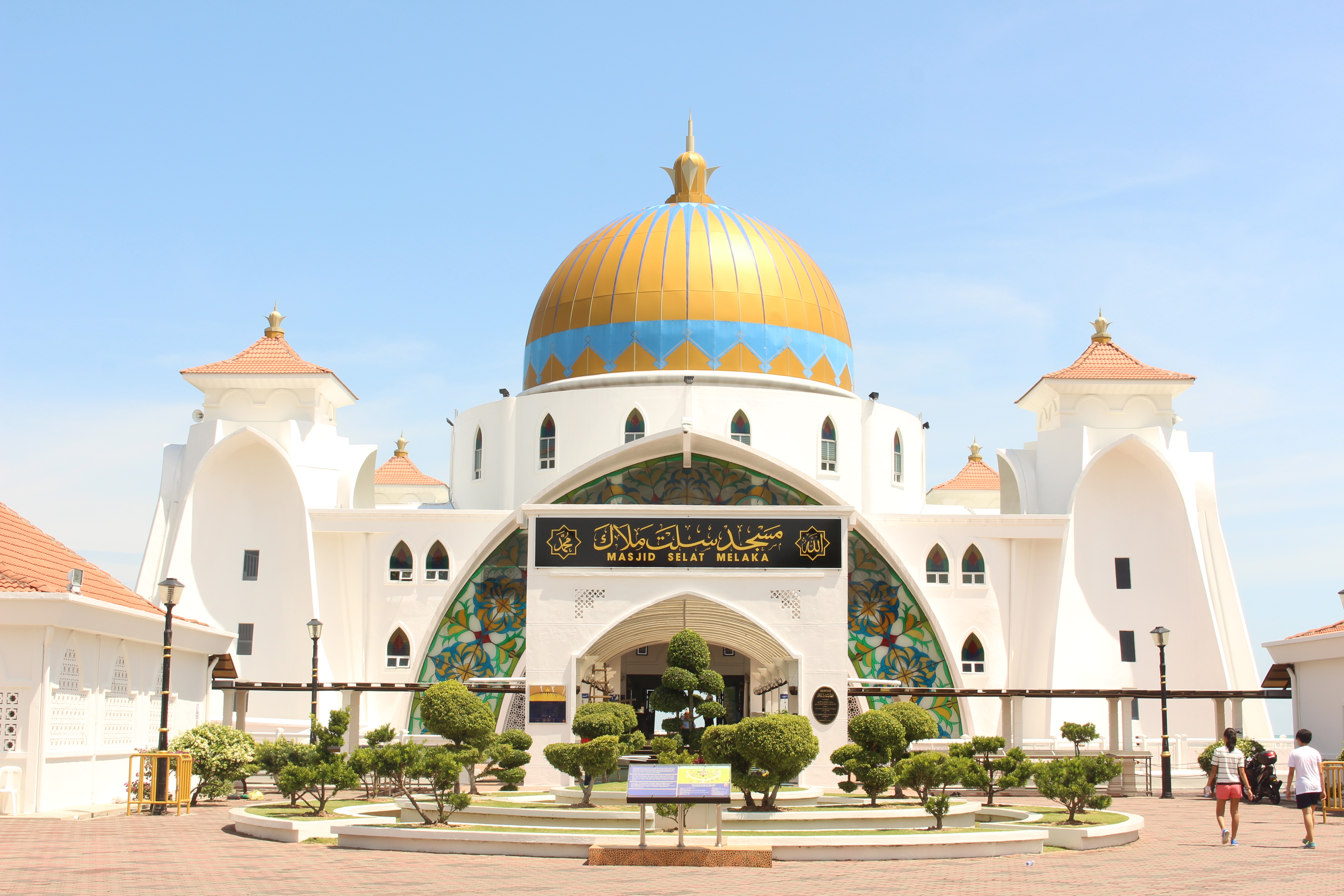
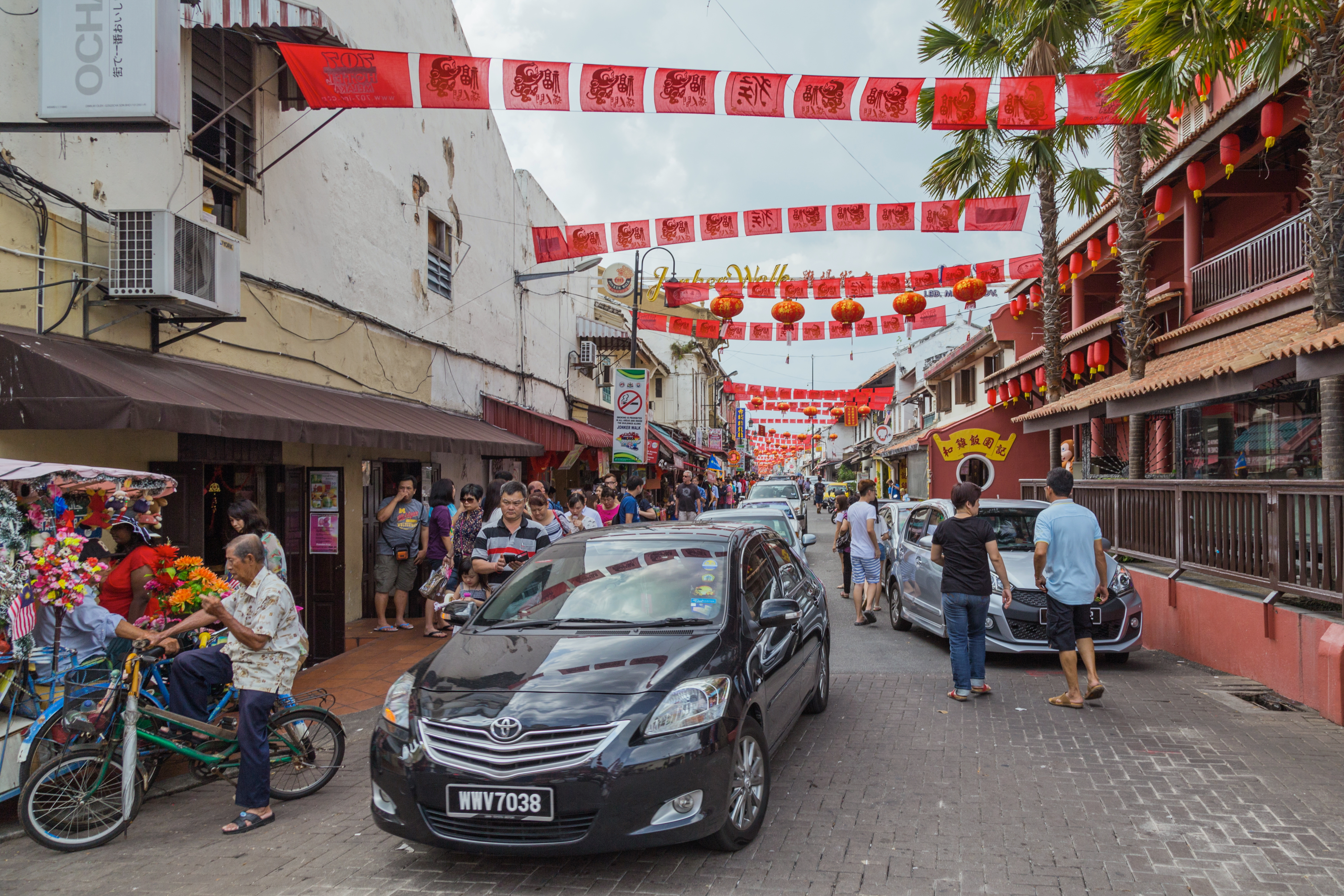
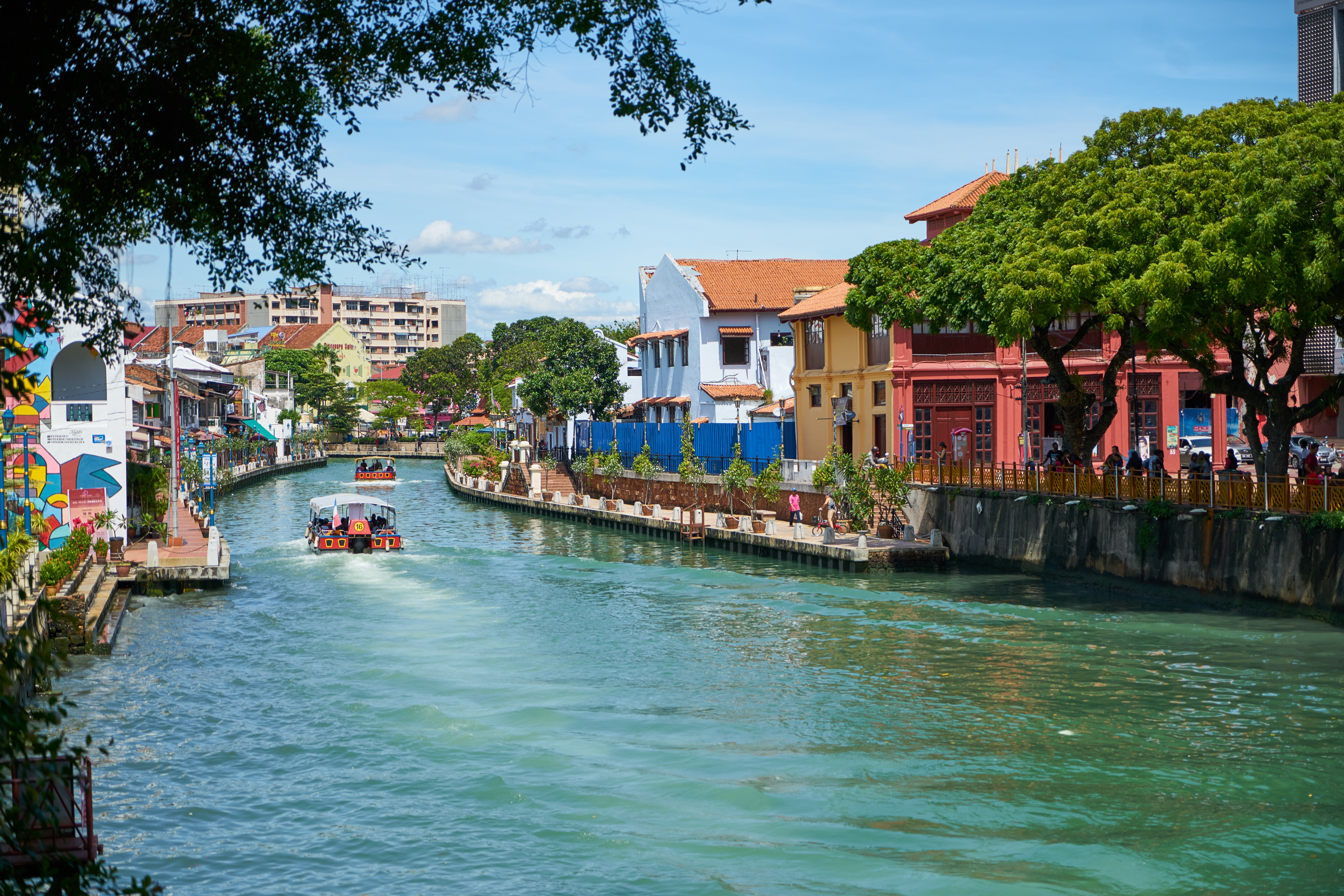
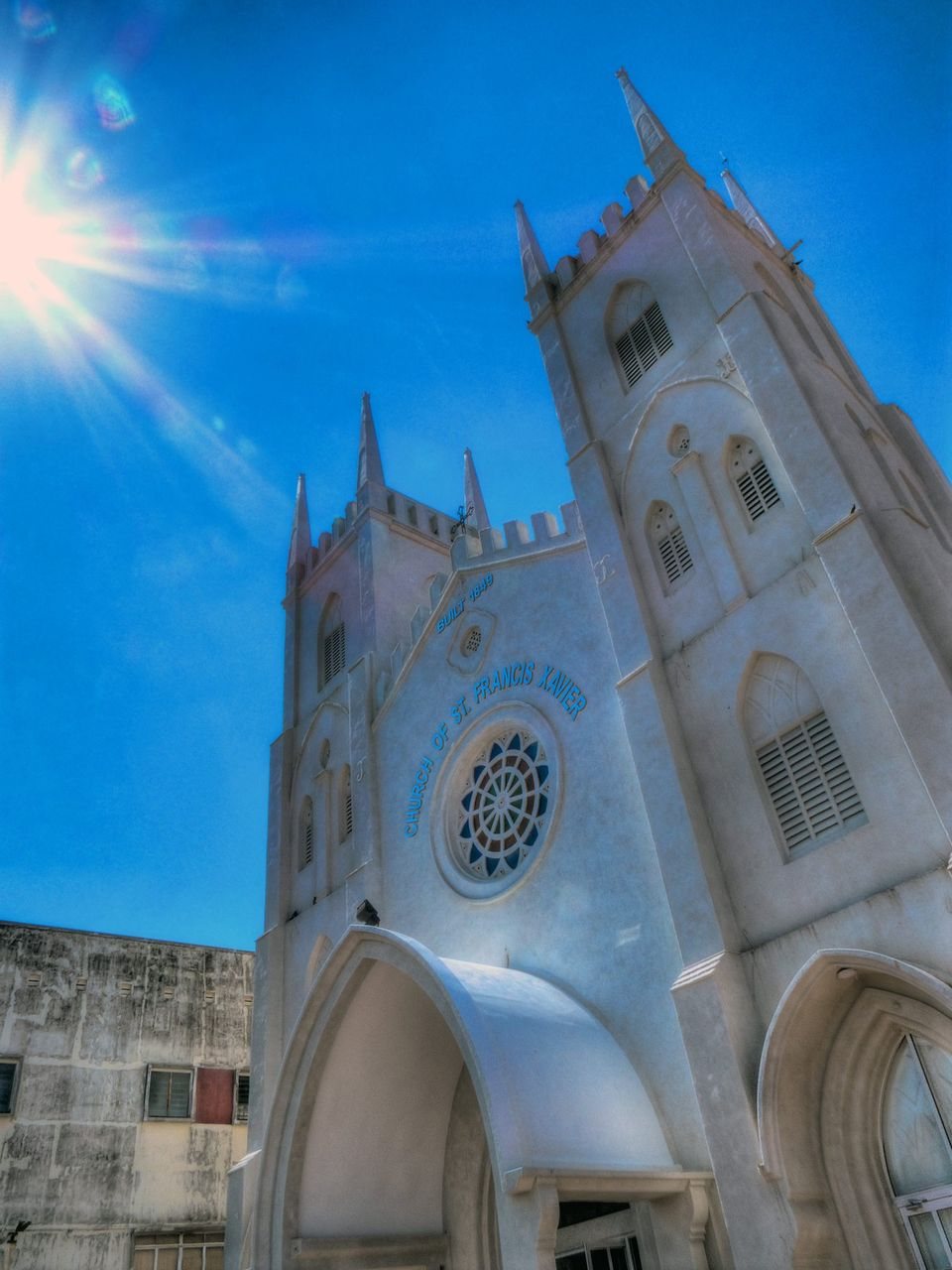
- City centre skyline Taming Sari Tower Malacca Sultanate Palace Museum Porta de Santiago Stadthuys St. Paul's Church Malacca Straits Mosque Jonker Walk Malacca River Church of St. Francis Xavier

- Flag Seal
- Nickname: Bandaraya Bersejarah; Historical City
- Interactive map of Malacca City
- Malacca City in Malacca Malacca City (Malaysia) Malacca City (Asia) Malacca City (Earth)
- Coordinates: 02°11′40″N 102°14′55″E
- Country: Malaysia
- State: Malacca
- District: Melaka Tengah
- Founded: 1396
- Establishment of the local government: 1824
- Municipality status: 1 January 1977
- City status: 15 April 2003; 23 years ago

Government
  - Type: City council
  - Body: Malacca City Council
  - Mayor: Shadan Othman

Area
  - State capital city: 277 km^{2} (107 sq mi)
  - Metro: 307.86 km^{2} (118.87 sq mi)
- Elevation: 6 m (20 ft)

Population (2019)
  - State capital city: 579,000
  - Demonym: Malaccans
- Time zone: UTC+8 (MST)
  - Summer (DST): Not observed
- Postal code: 75xxx to 78xxx
- Area code(s): 06
- Vehicle registration: M
- Website: mbmb.gov.my

UNESCO World Heritage Site
- Official name: The Historic City of Melaka
- Part of: Melaka and George Town, the Historic Cities of the Straits of Malacca
- Criteria: Cultural: (ii)(iii)(iv)
- Reference: 1223bis-001
- Inscription: 2008 (32nd Session)
- Extensions: 2011
- Area: 45.3 ha (112 acres)
- Buffer zone: 242.8 ha (600 acres)

Malacca City (Malay: Bandaraya Melaka or Kota Melaka) is the capital city of the Malaysian state of Malacca. It is the oldest Malaysian city on the Strait of Malacca, having become a successful entrepôt in the era of the Malacca Sultanate. The city was founded in 1396 by Parameswara, a Sumatran prince who escaped to the Malay Peninsula when the Srivijaya Empire fell to the Majapahit.

Following the establishment of the Malacca Sultanate in 1400, the city drew the attention of traders from the Middle East, South Asia, and East Asia, as well as the Portuguese, who intended to dominate the trade route in Asia. After Malacca was conquered by Portugal in 1511, the city became an area of conflict when the sultanates of Aceh and Johor attempted to take control from the Portuguese.

Following a number of wars between these territories, Aceh declined in influence while Johor survived and expanded its influence over territory previously lost to Aceh in Sumatra when Johor co-operated with the Dutch to take Malacca from the Portuguese, who had come to establish dominance over Java and Maluku Islands. However, due to royal internal strife between the Malay and the Bugis people, the Johor-Riau Empire was divided into the sultanates of Johor and Riau-Lingga. This separation became permanent when the British arrived to establish their presence in the Malay Peninsula. The Dutch, who already felt threatened in the presence of the British, began conquering the Riau-Lingga Sultanate along with the rest of Sumatra, while Johor came under British influence following the signing of the Anglo-Dutch Treaty of 1824.

When the British succeeded in extending their influence over the Malay Peninsula, the city soon became an area of development under the Straits Settlements as part of the British Empire. The development and burgeoning prosperity were, however, halted when the Japanese arrived in World War II and occupied the area from 1942 to 1945. During the occupation, many of the city's residents were taken and forced to construct the Death Railway in Burma (present-day Myanmar). After the war, the city was returned to the British and remained as the capital of the Malacca territory. The status as a capital remained until the formation of Malaysia in 1963, and in 2008 it was listed, together with George Town of Penang, as a UNESCO World Heritage Site for its long history. As of 2019 it has a population of 579,000.

The economy of Malacca City is largely based on tourism. As the economic centre of the state of Malacca, it also hosts several international conferences and trade fairs. The city is located along the Maritime Silk Road, proposed by China in 2013. Among the tourist attractions in Malacca City are Porta de Santiago, Jonker Walk, Little India, Portuguese Settlement, Stadthuys, Maritime Museum, Christ Church, Malacca Sultanate Palace Museum and Taming Sari Tower.

== Etymology ==
According to legend, the site that is now Malacca City was named Malaka when Parameswara, a Sumatran prince arrived there. While he was resting under a tree known as a Malacca tree, he saw his warrior's hunting dogs were challenged and kicked into a river by a tiny mouse deer. Amused by this, he chose to name the site Malaka after the tree under which he was sitting.

There are at least two other theories on the origin the naming of Malacca: Tomé Pires explains the name in the Suma Oriental as a transliteration of the term for a fugitive, Malaqa, reflecting Parameswara's history as one, and the Malay Annals themselves suggest that Arab merchants called the kingdom Malakat (Arabic for 'congregation of merchants') during the reign of Muhammad Shah (1424–1444), because it was home to many trading communities.

When the city came under Portuguese administration, its name was spelled "Malaca", under Dutch administration as "Malakka" or "Malacka", and under British rule, "Malacca". The Straits of Malacca were named after the city at the time of the Malacca Sultanate.

== History ==
Historical affiliations

Sultanate of Malacca 1396–1511
(Portugal) Portuguese Empire 1511–1641
(Dutch Republic) Dutch Empire 1641–1795; 1818–1825
Straits Settlements 1826–1942; 1945–1946
Empire of Japan 1942–1945
Malayan Union 1946–1948
Federation of Malaya 1948–1963
Malaysia 1963–present

=== Founding of Malacca ===
Malacca was established when Parameswara, who had escaped from Palembang in Sumatra, decided to build a new kingdom following Malay Srivijaya's fall in 1377 after being attacked by Javanese Majapahit. Before he reached the site, he arrived in Temasek, which he decided to make the centre of the new Malay Kingdom's administration. But when Parameswara lived there, he killed Temagi, a Regent of Singapura who served under the Siamese King to take over the throne from Temagi. Fearing further reprisals by Siam when the news reached the Siamese Kingdom, Parameswara decided to move to a new place. After he left Temasek, it was attacked by Majapahit. Parameswara then headed to the north of Malay Peninsula and arrived at Muar, where he tried to establish another new kingdom at either Biawak Busuk or Kota Buruk, but found the locations unsuitable.

Parameswara continue his journey to the north, where he reportedly visited Sening Ujong (now Sungai Ujong) before arriving at a Malay fishing village at the mouth of Bertam River (now Malacca River). He decided to stop there to rest. While he was resting under a tree, he saw his follower's hunting dogs fighting with a small mouse deer before they were kicked into a river by the deer. Amused by this, he thought the place he rested must be an unusual place; following this event, in 1396 he announced the place would be called Malaka. Soon, the site became the centre of the Malay world in the 15th and 16th centuries and the most prosperous entrepôt in the Malay Archipelago. In 1403, the first official Chinese trade envoy led by Admiral Yin Qing arrived in Malacca. Later, Parameśwara was escorted by Zheng He and other envoys in his successful visits. Malacca's relationships with Ming granted protection to Malacca against attacks from Siam and Majapahit and Malacca officially submitted as a protectorate of Ming China. This encouraged the development of Malacca into a major trade settlement on the trade route between China and India, Middle East, Africa and Europe. To prevent the Malaccan empire from falling to the Siamese and Majapahit, he forged a relationship with the Ming dynasty of China for protection. Following the establishment of this relationship, the prosperity of the Malacca entrepôt was then recorded by the first Chinese visitor, Ma Huan, who travelled together with Admiral Zheng He. On his descriptions, he wrote;

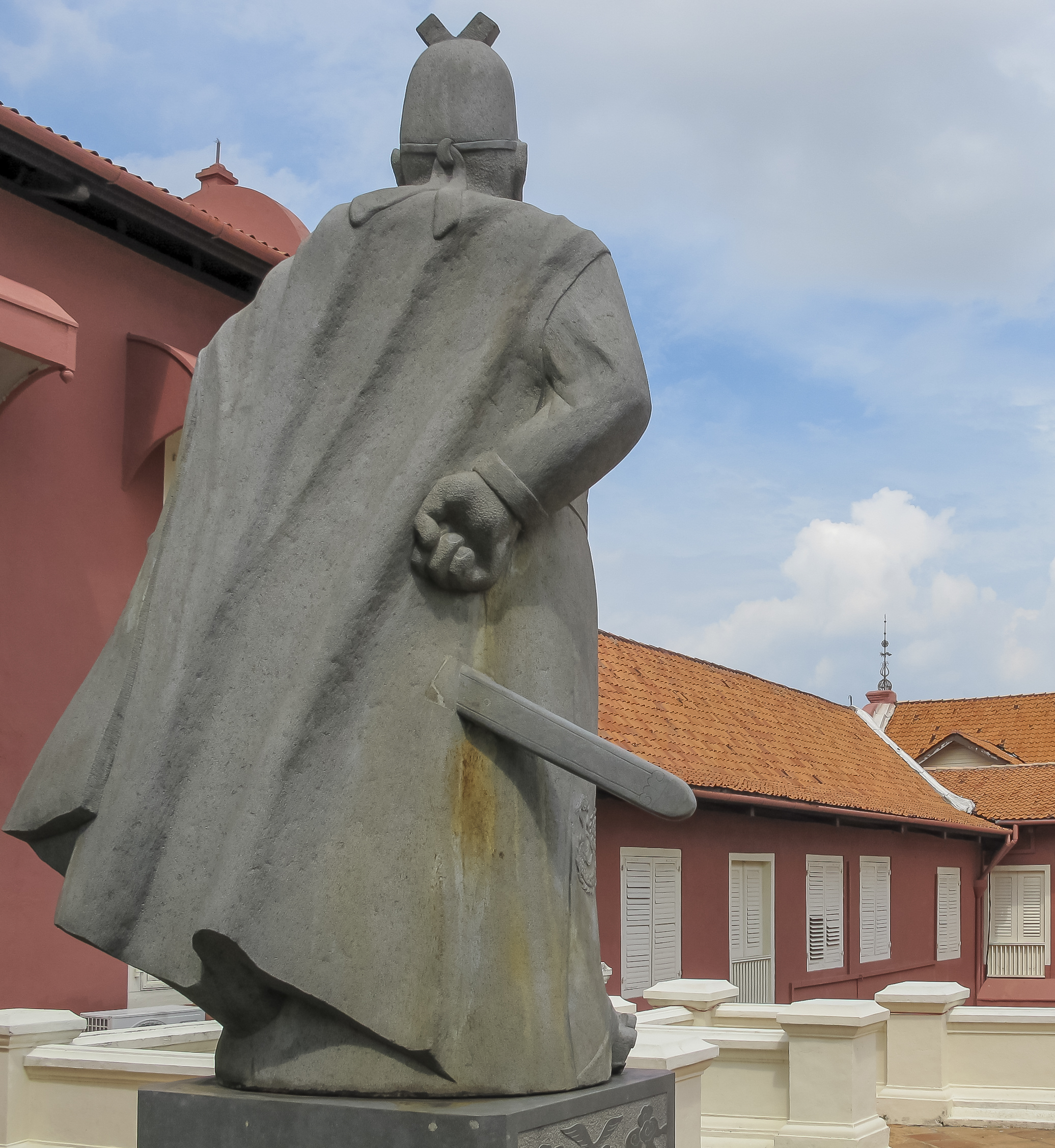
The Zheng He monument today (seen from the backside), marking his stopover at the city

Malacca was a well-established city surrounded by a palisade with four gates and watch towers. Inside the walled towers was a second fortification, a kind of citadel, within whose confines were the merchants' godowns, the treasury and food storehouses. The Malacca River divided the city into two almost equal halves, the southern half being the inner citadel and the ruler's compound and the northern half, reached by a bridge some distance from the river mouth, containing the residents of many foreign merchants. The bridge and its approaches comprised the main venue for all commercial kinds. Constructed on the bridge was about a score of market stalls: an easy location for small watercraft to reach with their loads of produce and also close to the docks where foreign sea-going vessels unloaded goods for transhipment.

— Ma Huan, Chinese Muslim voyager and translator.

In Malacca during the early 15th century, Ming China actively sought to develop a commercial hub and a base of operation for treasure voyages into the Indian Ocean. Malacca had been a relatively insignificant region, not even qualifying as a polity prior to the voyages according to both Ma Huan and Fei Xin, and was a vassal region of Siam. In 1405, the Ming court dispatched Admiral Zheng He with a stone tablet enfeoffing the Western Mountain of Malacca as well as an imperial order elevating the status of the port to a country. The Chinese also established a government depot (官廠) as a fortified cantonment for their soldiers. Ma Huan reported that Siam did not dare to invade Malacca thereafter. The rulers of Malacca, such as Parameswara in 1411, would pay tribute to the Chinese emperor in person. Because of its strategic location, Malacca was an important stopping point for Zheng He's fleet. To enhance relations, Hang Li Po, according to local folklore, a daughter of the Ming Emperor of China, arrived in Malacca, accompanied by 500 attendants, to marry Sultan Manshur Shah who reigned from 1456 until 1477. Her attendants married locals and settled mostly in Bukit Cina. Due to Chinese involvement, Malacca had grown as key alternative to other important and established ports.

Due to the large influence of Arab, Persian, and Indian traders, Malacca soon turned into an Islamic sultanate, and Parameswara converted to Islam when he married a princess from Pasai, changing his name to Sultan Iskandar Shah. With the rise of Melaka as an empire, both the Majapahit and Siamese kingdoms were unable to conquer it, especially with the Chinese protection. During this time, a Hindu–Malay and Tamil–Malay society were also formed. The Sultan died in 1414 and was succeeded by his son, Megat Iskandar Shah. Malacca continued to prosper until the eighth Sultanate of Malacca, Mahmud Shah, with the various races who came to trade becoming associated with particular trade specialties; the Gujaratis, Tamils, and Bengalis were mostly cloth merchants, the Arabs and Persians waited for their vessels to be filled with goods from China, the Chinese dealt mainly in silk, camphor, and porcelain, and the natives of Malay Archipelago, like the Bugis and other island peoples, traded mainly in spices and sandalwood, and the Minangkabau in pepper and gold, with the Javanese controlling the rice and imported foodstuffs. Like other traders, the Chinese established their own area in the city, occupying the southeast side of the port around a hill called Bukit Cina, where they constructed temples and a well called Hang Li Poh's Well, named after Hang Li Po, the fifth wife of the sixth Sultan of Malacca, Mansur Shah, who was a Chinese princess from the Ming dynasty.

=== European conquest ===
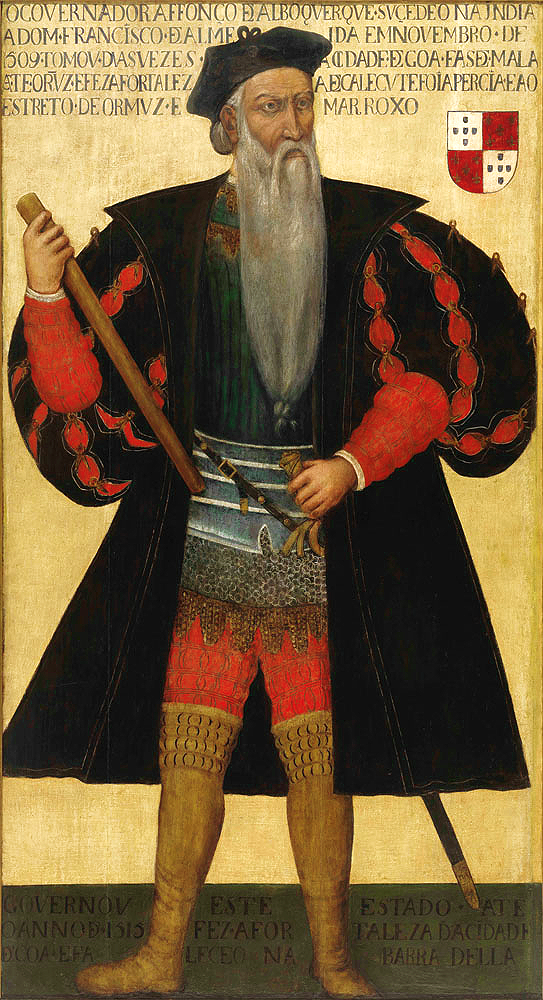
Portrait of Afonso de Albuquerque, the first European to conquer Malacca

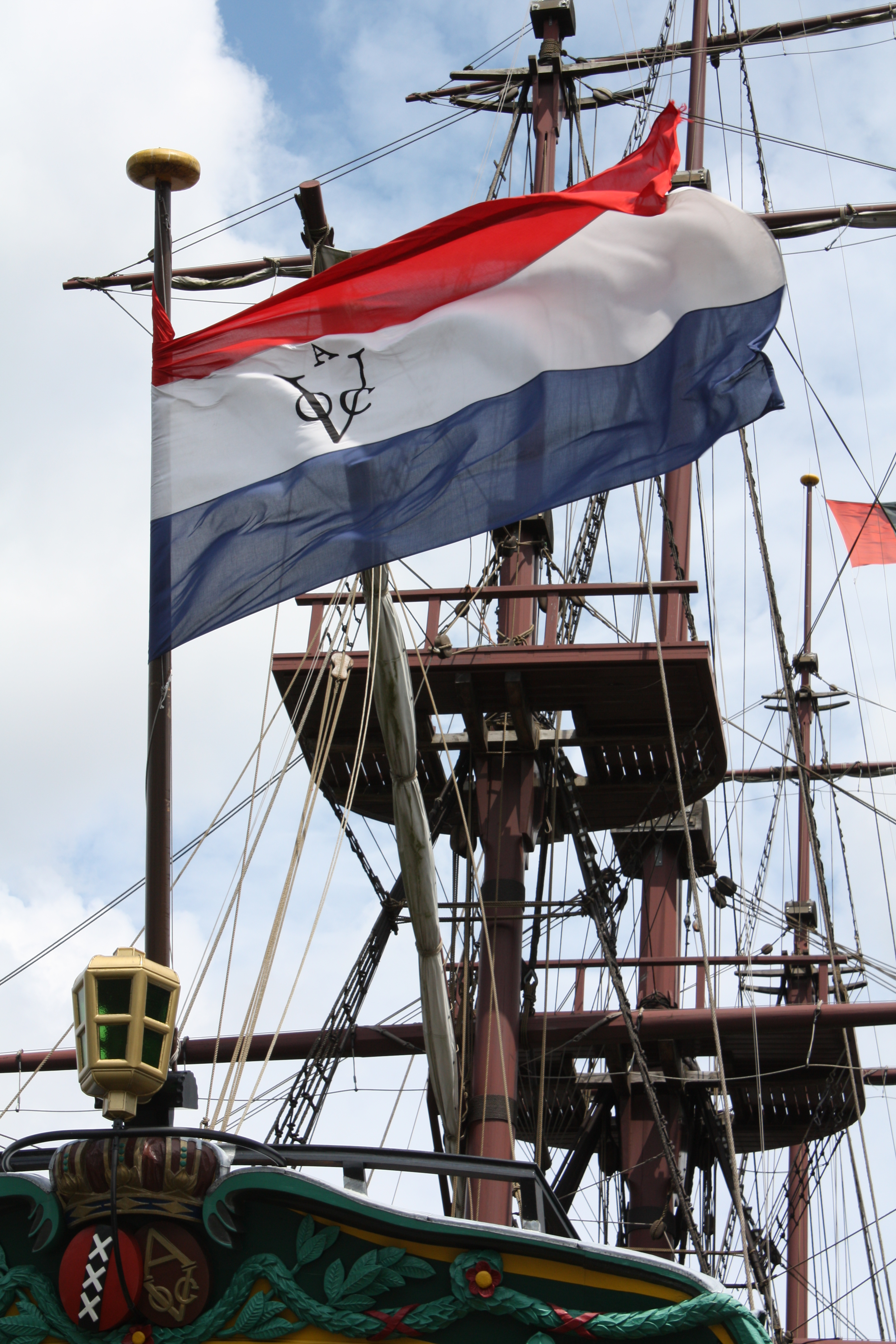
Replica of an East Indiaman of the Dutch East India Company/United East Indies Company (VOC).

Due to its riches, the news of the success of Malacca reached the Portuguese, who had an established presence on Indian ports. The Portuguese, under King Manuel I, sent a representative named Diogo Lopes de Sequeira to establish contact with the Sultanate. At first, Sequeira was well received by Sultan Mahmud Shah. But the Tamil Muslim community, who already had an established presence in Malacca, convinced the Sultan to eliminate the Portuguese based on their treatment of the Muslims of Goa. Reacting to the report, Sultan Mahmud then ordered several men from the Portuguese delegation to be captured and killed, but some of them managed to escape with their ships. Thus, in April 1511 Afonso de Albuquerque, who was the Portuguese expedition leader together with his armada, arrived in Malacca to sever its Islamic and Venetian trade. His intention was described in his own words when he arrived to Malacca:

If they were only to take "Malaca" out of the hands of the Moors, Cairo and Mecca would be entirely ruined, and Venice would then be able to obtain no spiceries except what her merchants might buy in Portugal.

— Report on Albuquerque's words on his arriving to Malacca.

The Portuguese launched their first attack on 25 July 1511, but this was met with failure. Albuquerque then launched another attack on 15 August 1511, which proved successful as Malacca was captured on that day. The Portuguese constructed a fortress called A Famosa using rocks and stones taken from Muslim graves, mosques, and other buildings. Several churches and convents, a bishop's palace, and administrative buildings such as the governor's palace were built. The Portuguese imposed higher taxes on Chinese traders and restricted their ownership of land. The news of the city's capture reached the Ming dynasty of China; the Chinese were also displeased about the kidnapping of many Chinese children by the Portuguese in Tuen Mun. In retaliation for Portugal's activity in Malacca, several Portuguese were later killed by the Chinese in the battles of Tunmen and Xicaowan in China.

By the mid-16th century, the two sultanates of Aceh and Johor had arisen to take control of Malacca from the Portuguese which then became the centre of struggle between the three. By 1564, Aceh had retaken Aru (a territory which Sumatra had previously lost to Johor) and destroyed Johor's capital, Johor Lama, with the Johor royal family taken to Aceh to rule Johor as a vassal state. Other attacks were carried out in 1570, 1613, and 1623, when Johor tried to break away from Aceh. Aceh's ambition for domination later led to a clash with the Portuguese in Malacca. The two sultanates and the Portuguese became involved in a triangular war, but when both the Portuguese and the Johor saw Aceh as a threat due to its constant attacks against them, the two began to collaborate to fight Aceh. In 1582 the Portuguese assisted Johor to thwart an attack by Aceh, but the arrangement ended when Johor attacked the Portuguese in 1587. Aceh continued its attacks against the Portuguese, and was later destroyed when a large additional armada from the Portuguese port of Goa came to defend Malacca and destroy the sultanate.

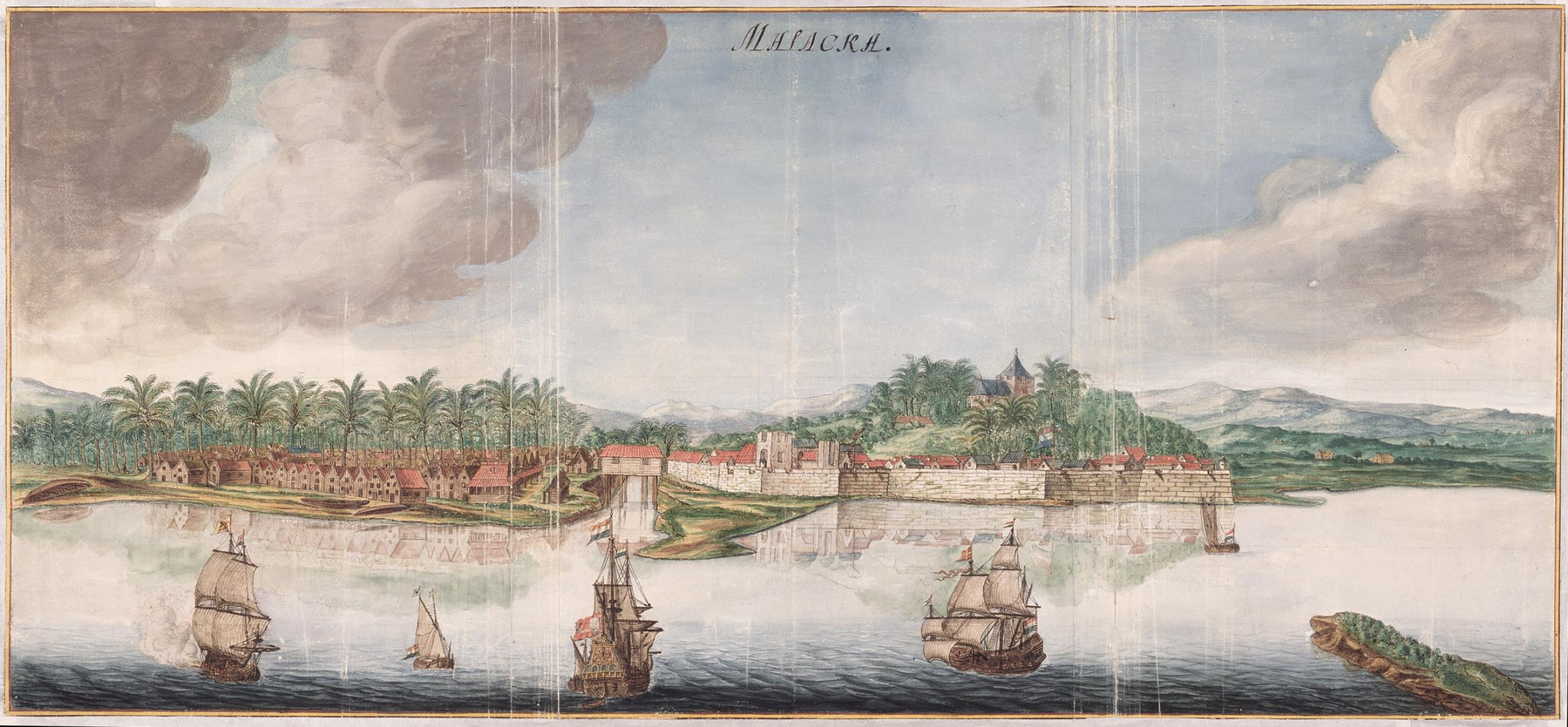
A painting of Dutch Malakka fort, c. 1665

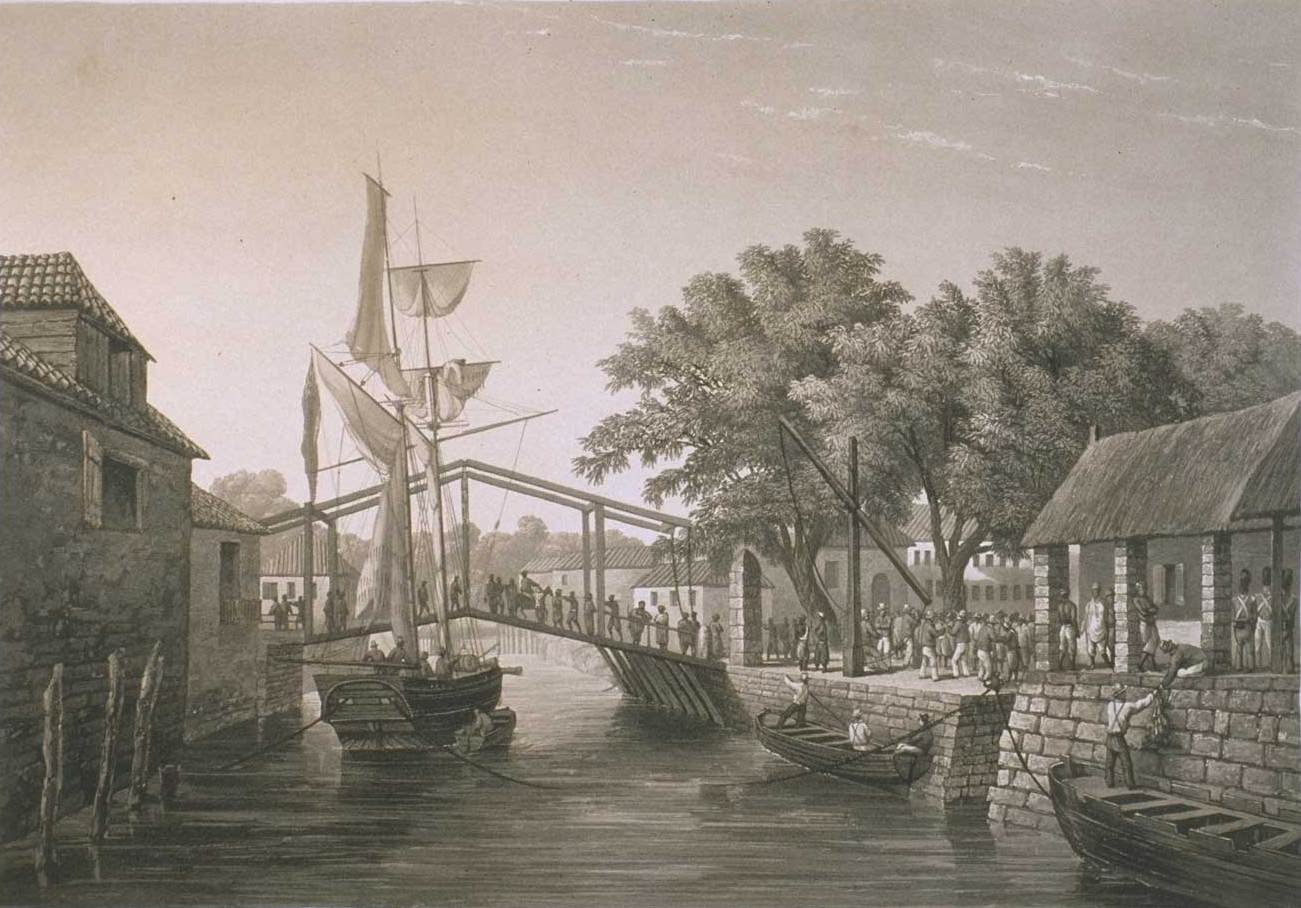
French navigator Cyrille Pierre Théodore Laplace visiting Malacca between 1833 and 1839

After Aceh was left weakened, the Dutch East India Company (VOC) arrived, and Johor formed a treaty with them to flush out the Portuguese in the second capture of Malacca. The Dutch succeeded at overtaking Malacca while Johor managed to re-establish its suzerainty over many of its former dependencies in Sumatra, such as Siak (1662) and Indragiri (1669). The Dutch expanded the size of the city fort and built a significant amount of additional infrastructure. As they had less interest in the Malay Peninsula and Sumatra than they had in Java and the Maluku Islands, the Dutch remained neutral in local disputes until 1756 when the Bugis, who ruled the Riau-Lingga Sultanate, began to threaten Dutch maritime trade. The threats increased in the 18th century, when English rivalry started to establish its presence over areas in the northern Malay Peninsula. This led the Dutch to seize the Bugis areas of Riau and expel the Bugis from both Riau and Selangor, for fearing that these areas would otherwise have fallen under British rule. Malacca was placed under the direct control of Batavia in Java.

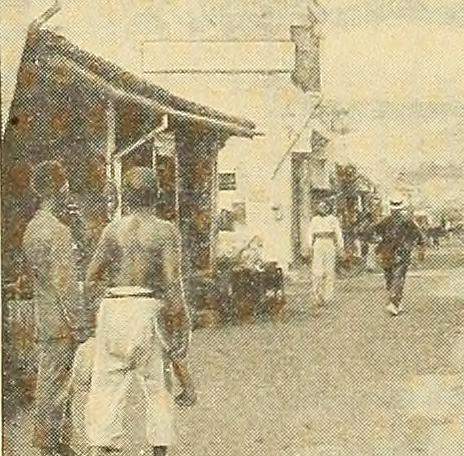
Street scene of Malacca City in 1912, during the British administration

From 1796 until 1801, and 1807 to 1818 Malacca was temporarily placed under a British Resident as the Netherlands were conquered by France in the Napoleonic Wars. It was returned to the Dutch in 1818. Malacca served as the staging area for the British victory in 1811. A treaty was later signed in 1824 between the British and Dutch to prevent further British influence in Java; one result was that the Johor-Riau Empire fell under two colonial powers along with Malacca, which was then officially handed to the British in 1825 and integrated as part of the Straits Settlements. The city came under direct control of a Resident in Penang, and the old fort in the city was then dismantled. The British established regulations for infrastructure with the construction of, for example, back alleys, chimneys, back yards, fire escapes, fire alleys, and pedestrian arcades.

=== World War II, post-independence and present ===
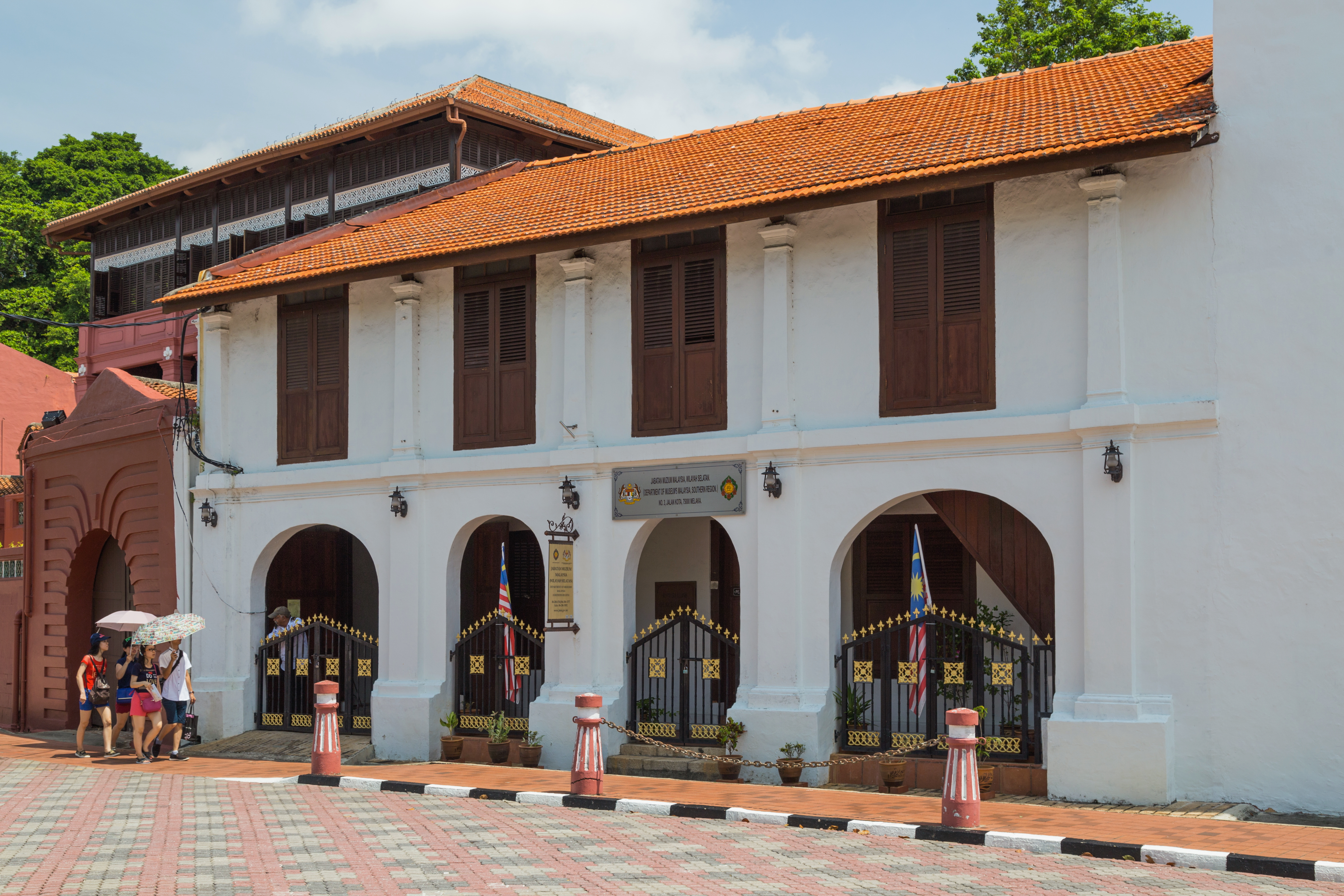
Department of Museums Malaysia, Malacca City

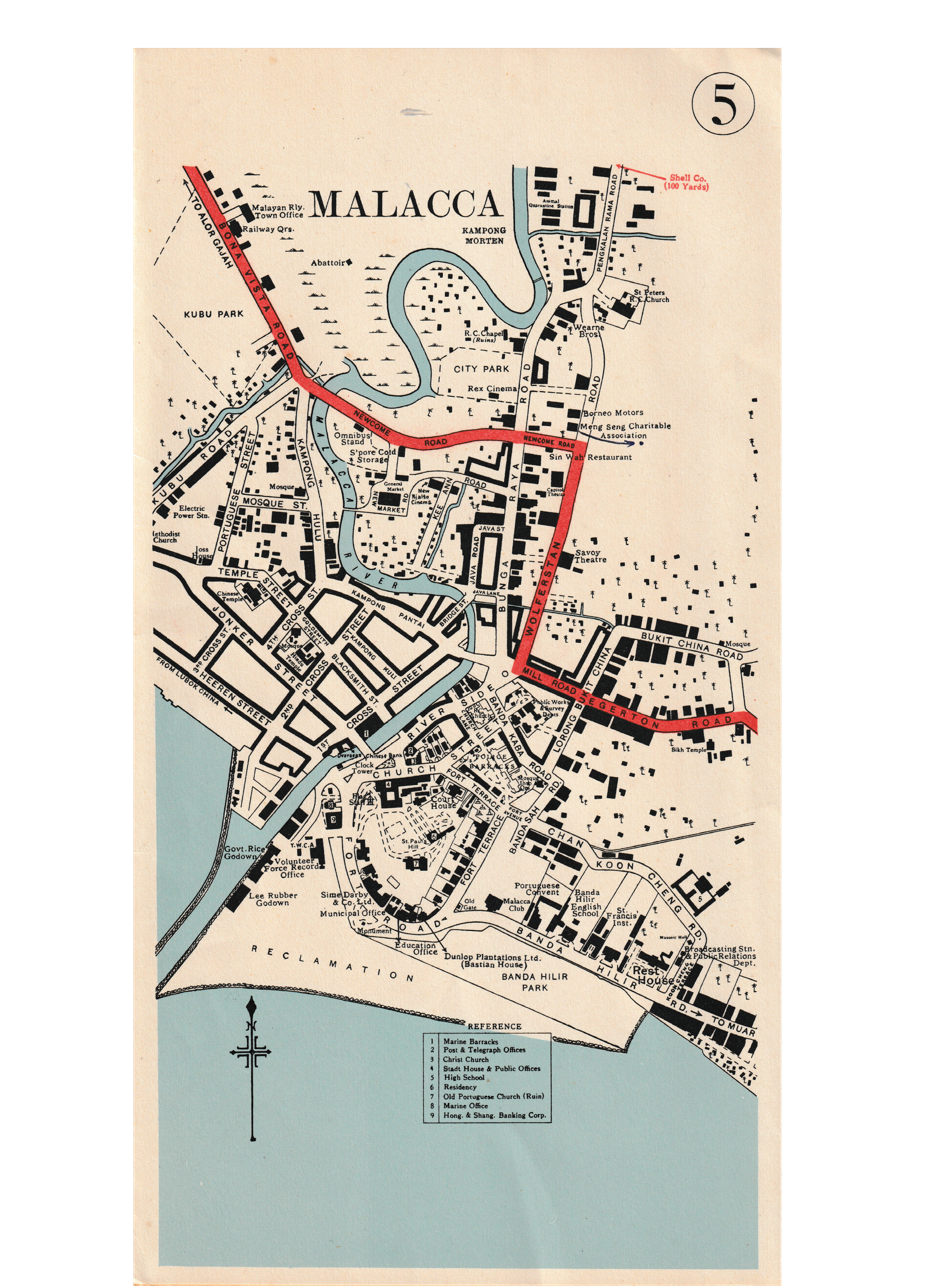
Pre-independence Map of Malacca Town from "Road Map of Malaya" issued by Shell in 1951, detailing its road and place names.

During the first stage of World War II, the city's residents continued to live normally until the news of the Sinking of Prince of Wales and Repulse on 10 December 1941 reached the city and struck panic. British colonial officials began to flee and thousands of the city's residents hid in rubber estates and jungles since they heard about the acts of cruelty committed in other parts of Malaya following their conquest by the Japanese. The Japanese Army arrived in the city on 14 January 1942 in a convoy of bicycles, but as they mainly focused on ensuring the retreat of the British to the south of the Malay Peninsula and Singapore, there was no major battle in the city or other parts of Malacca. During their occupation, a kempeitai headquarters was established in the formerly British "Government Rest House" which served as a place for arrests, torture and executions. Those who still lived in the city were given low rice rations with a tapioca supplement and a number of them were taken to Thailand and forced to construct the Burma–Siam Railway.

When the Allies began to counter-attack against the Japanese, the Japanese officially surrendered to the Allies in August 1945 with the city left undamaged as there were no heavy battles, and it was administered as part of the British Military Administration until the formation of the Malayan Union and then the Federation of Malaya. After Malaya achieved its independence on 31 August 1957, a colonial building named "Malacca Club" was built by the British in the city as the social centre for Britons in British Malaya. The building was then turned into a memorial after 38 years to commemorate the Malayan independence day. After the Federation of Malaya, together with North Borneo, Sarawak and Singapore formed the Federation of Malaysia in 1963, Malacca Town was extensively developed, although many of the historical architectures inherited from its colonial days remain untouched. On 15 April 1989, Malacca Town was bestowed the "Historical City" title and on the same date in 2003 it was granted city status. On 7 July 2008, Malacca City was listed as one of the historical cities in Malaysia, together with George Town in the northern Malay Peninsula.

== Governance and politics ==
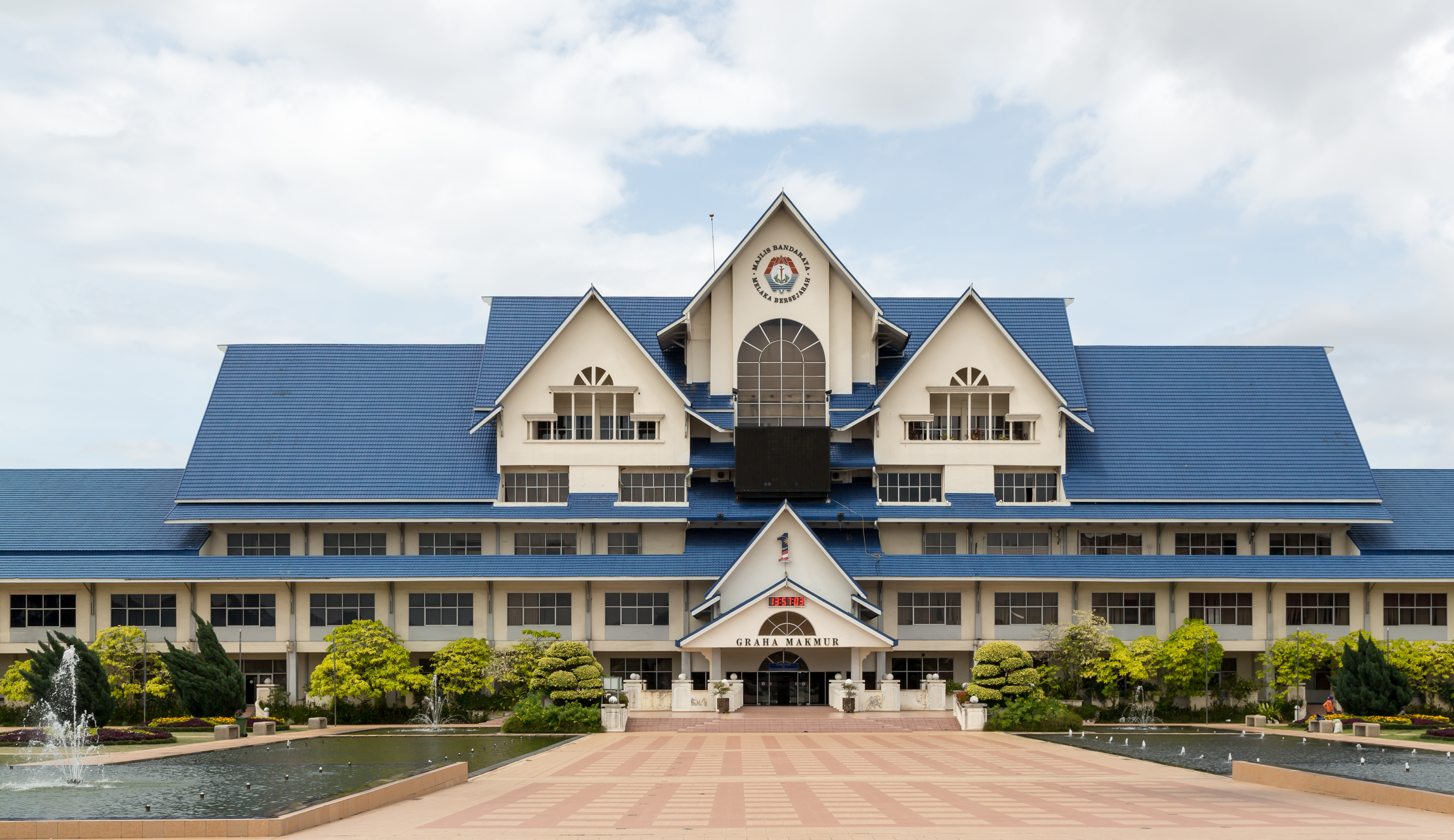
Malacca City Hall at Ayer Keroh town

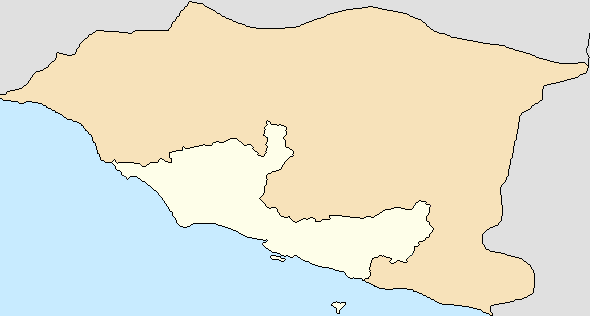
Locations of Malacca City and its suburbs

=== Local governance and city definition ===
The city is administered by the Malacca City Council (Majlis Bandaraya Melaka Bersejarah, MBMB). Formerly known as Malacca Municipal Council (Majlis Perbandaran Melaka Bandaraya Bersejarah, MPMBB), it was merged with the "Malacca Municipality Area" on 1 January 1977 with a new combined area of 297.19 square kilometres (114.75 mi^{2}). Then on 15 April 2003, MPMBB was upgraded into MBMB before part of its area, covering 57.66 kilometres separated for Hang Tuah Jaya Municipal Council (MPHTJ). MBMB area is currently at 270 sq kilometres as a result of land reclamation carried out since 1974, with a new administration area of 30.86 sq kilometres. Together these areas comprise a metropolitan area of 307.86 sq kilometres.

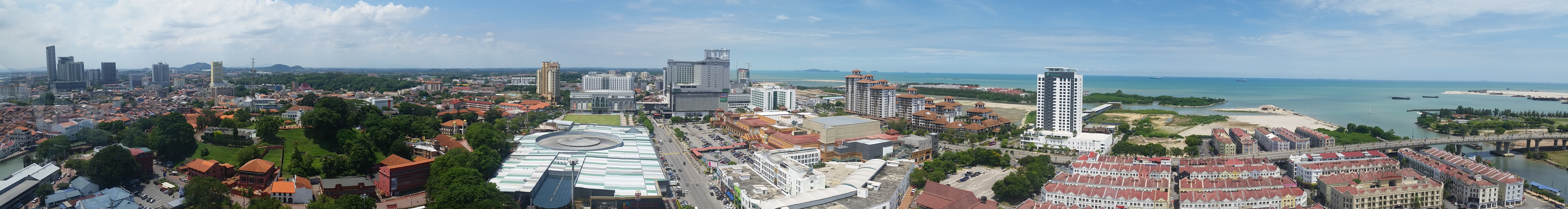
Panorama view of Central Business District or Downtown (Malay: Bandar Hilir) and Strait of Malacca

=== State and national representation ===
Malacca City is the centre of political and economic administration for the state of Malacca. There is one member of parliament (MP) representing one parliamentary constituency in the city: Kota Melaka (P.138). The city also elects five representatives to the state legislature from the state assembly districts of Kesidang, Kota Laksamana, Duyong, Bandar Hilir and Telok Mas.

== Geography ==
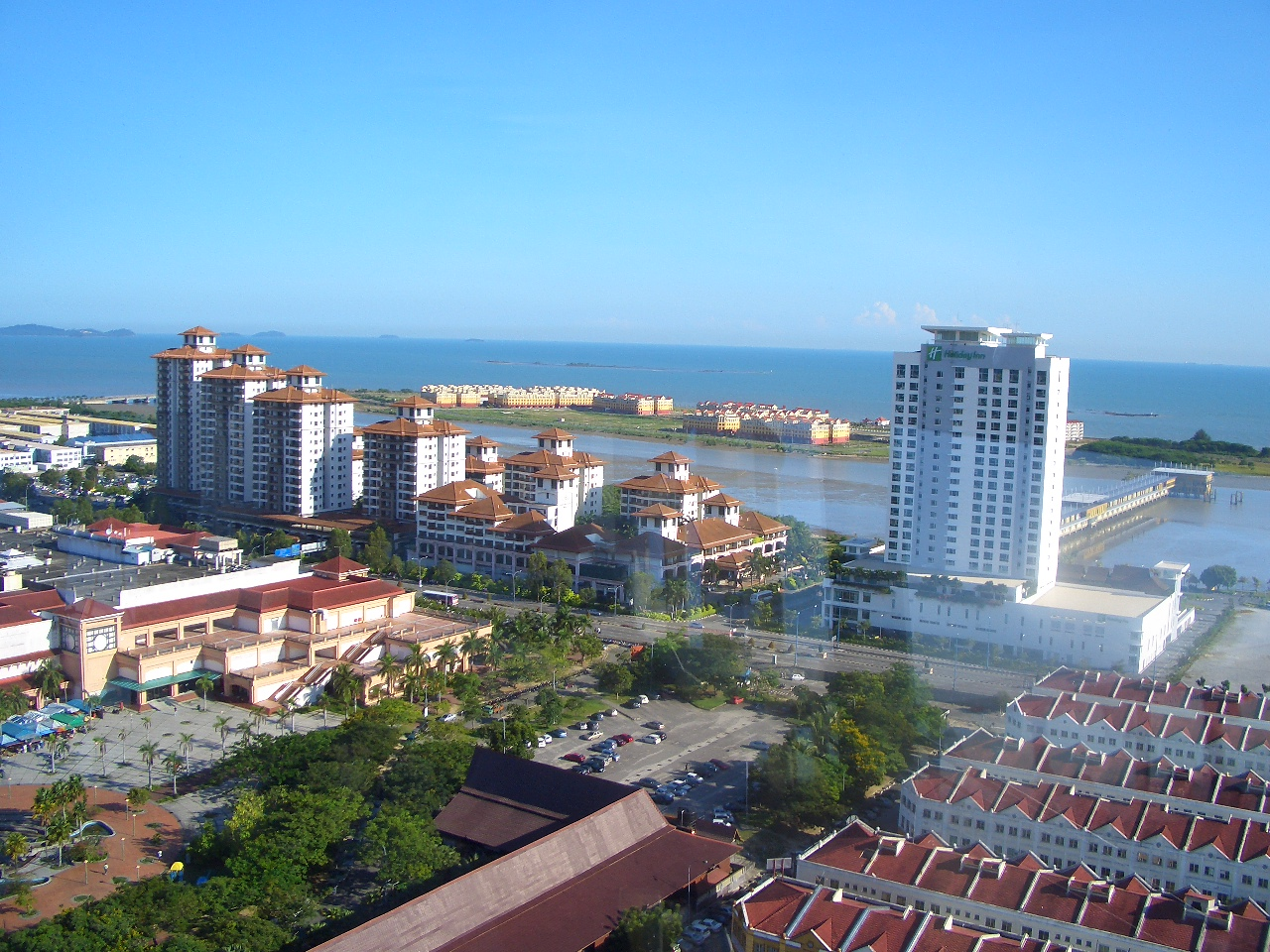

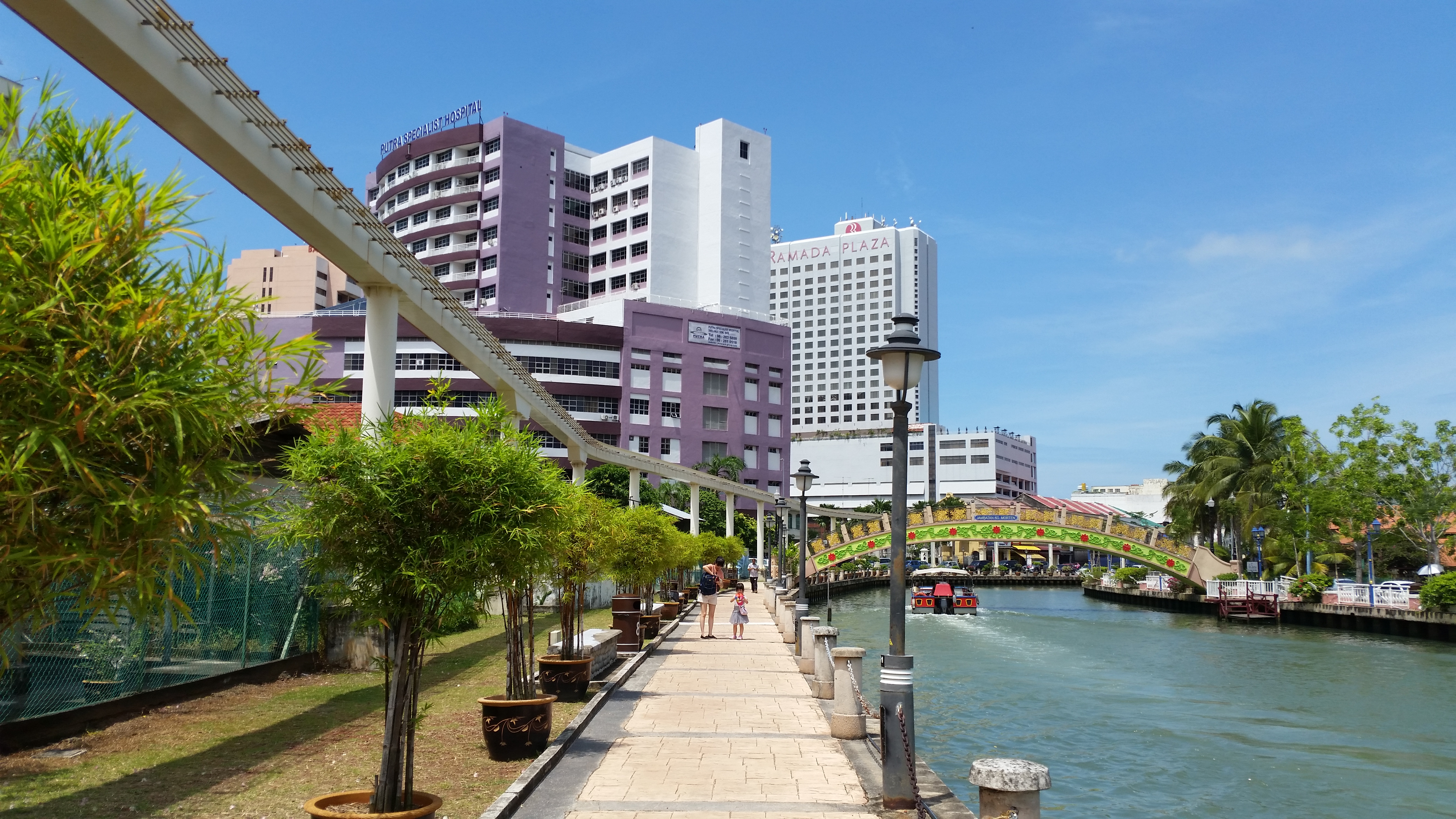
Part of the city centre, Malacca Island can be seen in a strip of land directly across the coast. (up) and Malacca River, Malacca City. (down)

The city is located on both sides of the Malacca River near its mouth on the Straits of Malacca. The city is approximately 152 kilometres from Malaysia's capital city, Kuala Lumpur. Due to large-scale land reclamation, it has grown in size, especially in the south. Its physical features are characterised by flat and gently undulating land stretching from its coast.

The historic central area of the city is located near the old coastline; it includes St Paul's Hill with the ruins of the Portuguese fortress and the Dutch Square on the right (eastern) bank of the river, and the old Chinatown on the left (western) bank. The Chinese Hill (Bukit Cina), where a large old Chinese cemetery is located, was formerly located to the northeast of the city, but is now surrounded by new buildings on all sides.

=== Climate ===
Malacca's weather is hot and humid throughout the year with rainfall, the intensity of which depends on the time of the year. It is one of the driest cities in Malaysia, receiving just under 2,000 mm (79 in) of rainfall while most areas in Peninsular Malaysia receive an average of around 2,500 mm (98 in) of rainfall annually. However, Malacca has no dry season as average rainfall is more than 100 mm (3.9 in) for each month. Malacca is classified as having a tropical rainforest climate (Af) under the Köppen climate classification system, more subject to the Intertropical Convergence Zone than the trade winds and with no cyclones so a pure equatorial climate. The relatively stable weather allows Malacca to be visited year-round.

Climate data for Malacca (1991–2020 normals, extremes 1930–present)
| Month | Jan | Feb | Mar | Apr | May | Jun | Jul | Aug | Sep | Oct | Nov | Dec | Year |
|---|---|---|---|---|---|---|---|---|---|---|---|---|---|
| Record high °C (°F) | 35.2 (95.4) | 37.8 (100.0) | 37.2 (99.0) | 37.3 (99.1) | 38.0 (100.4) | 34.7 (94.5) | 35.7 (96.3) | 35.0 (95.0) | 35.6 (96.1) | 35.6 (96.1) | 34.4 (93.9) | 34.6 (94.3) | 38.0 (100.4) |
| Mean daily maximum °C (°F) | 31.8 (89.2) | 32.9 (91.2) | 33.2 (91.8) | 33.0 (91.4) | 32.6 (90.7) | 32.1 (89.8) | 31.6 (88.9) | 31.6 (88.9) | 31.8 (89.2) | 32.1 (89.8) | 31.7 (89.1) | 31.3 (88.3) | 32.1 (89.8) |
| Daily mean °C (°F) | 26.9 (80.4) | 27.5 (81.5) | 27.8 (82.0) | 28.0 (82.4) | 28.2 (82.8) | 27.9 (82.2) | 27.5 (81.5) | 27.4 (81.3) | 27.4 (81.3) | 27.4 (81.3) | 26.9 (80.4) | 26.7 (80.1) | 27.5 (81.5) |
| Mean daily minimum °C (°F) | 23.7 (74.7) | 23.9 (75.0) | 24.3 (75.7) | 24.5 (76.1) | 24.6 (76.3) | 24.4 (75.9) | 23.9 (75.0) | 23.9 (75.0) | 23.9 (75.0) | 24.0 (75.2) | 23.9 (75.0) | 23.8 (74.8) | 24.1 (75.4) |
| Record low °C (°F) | 19.0 (66.2) | 20.0 (68.0) | 20.0 (68.0) | 19.0 (66.2) | 20.0 (68.0) | 20.0 (68.0) | 19.0 (66.2) | 20.0 (68.0) | 21.0 (69.8) | 21.0 (69.8) | 21.0 (69.8) | 20.0 (68.0) | 19.0 (66.2) |
| Average precipitation mm (inches) | 102.1 (4.02) | 79.7 (3.14) | 129.1 (5.08) | 166.1 (6.54) | 167.3 (6.59) | 172.6 (6.80) | 196.0 (7.72) | 219.5 (8.64) | 161.7 (6.37) | 189.4 (7.46) | 233.1 (9.18) | 177.1 (6.97) | 1,993.8 (78.50) |
| Average precipitation days (≥ 1.0 mm) | 8.0 | 6.5 | 10.1 | 11.9 | 10.6 | 9.4 | 11.7 | 12.4 | 11.4 | 12.1 | 15.7 | 12.5 | 132.3 |
| Average relative humidity (%) | 80 | 79 | 82 | 85 | 86 | 86 | 86 | 86 | 86 | 86 | 87 | 83 | 84 |
| Mean monthly sunshine hours | 166 | 185 | 183 | 179 | 171 | 164 | 163 | 166 | 174 | 171 | 157 | 152 | 2,031 |
Source 1: World Meteorological Organization
Source 2: OgimetDeutscher Wetterdienst (extremes and humidity)

== Demography ==
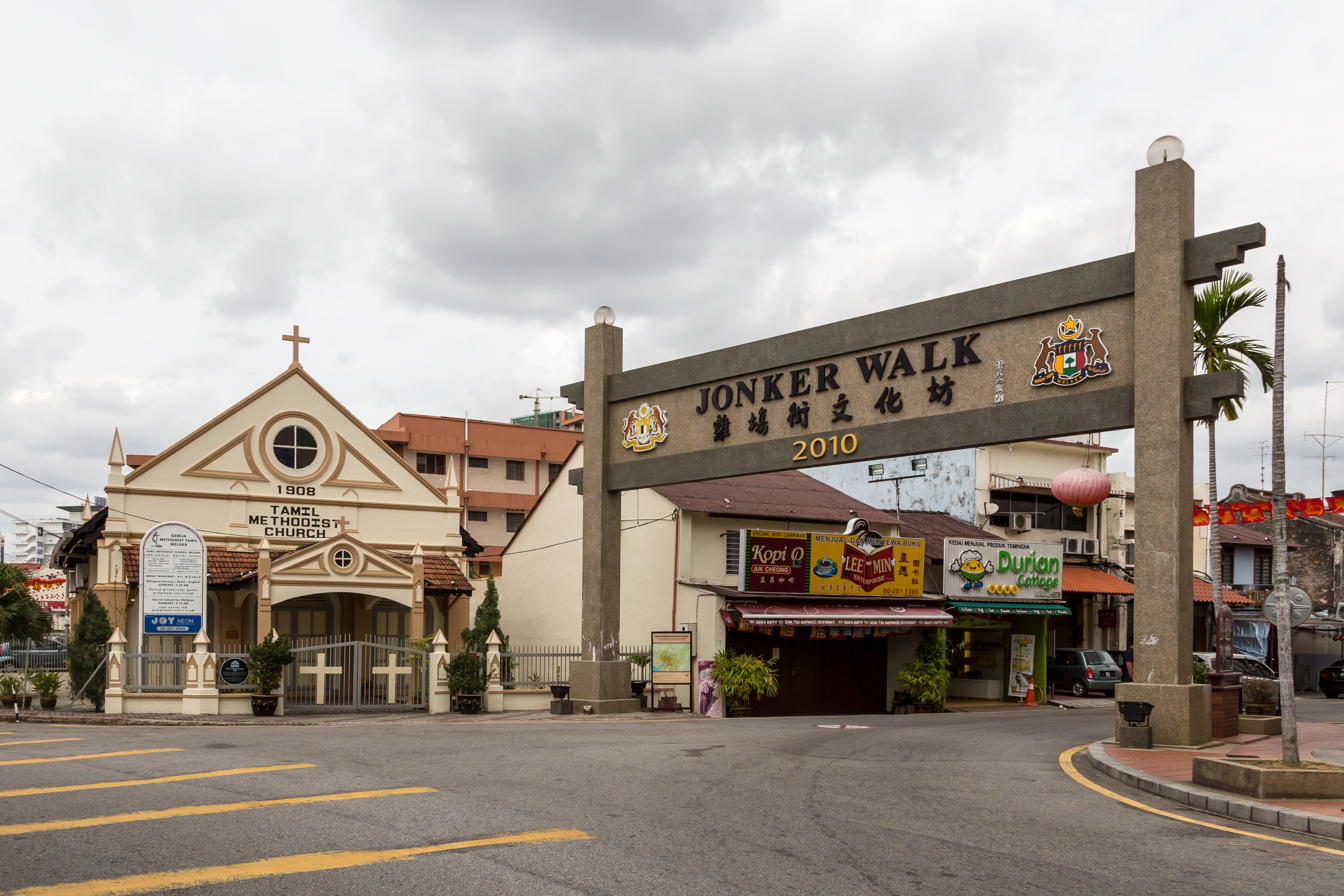
Tamil Methodist church in Malacca

=== Ethnicity and religion ===
The Malaysian census in 2010 reported the population of Malacca City was 484,885. Malays comprised the majority with 273,844, followed by Chinese with 158,828, Indian with 20,310 and others totalling 9,732. Around 22,171 were identified as Non-Malaysian citizens. Due to a large amount of interracial marriage since the era of the Malacca Sultanate, the city features its own ethnic mixtures of Baba Nyonya, Chitty and Kristang peoples. The Majority of the Malays were Muslims, and the Chinese and Peranakan were either Buddhists, Confucianists, Taoists or followers from other denominations of Chinese folk religion. The Indians, including the Chitty, were mainly Hindus while the Kristang were mostly Christian.

The Baba Nyonya are Straits-born Chinese, who have resided for generations since the era of the Malacca Sultanate as traders and intermarried with the local Malay women. They adopted the local culture and the Malay language as part of their lives while at the same time preserving some of their Chinese heritage and religious traditions. The Chitty are also a mixture of Indian traders with local women of various ethnic backgrounds such as Malays, Javanese, Bataks and Chinese. The Kristang exist as a result of marriage between the European Portuguese men with Malay women and/or Chinese and Indian women during the era of Portuguese Malacca.

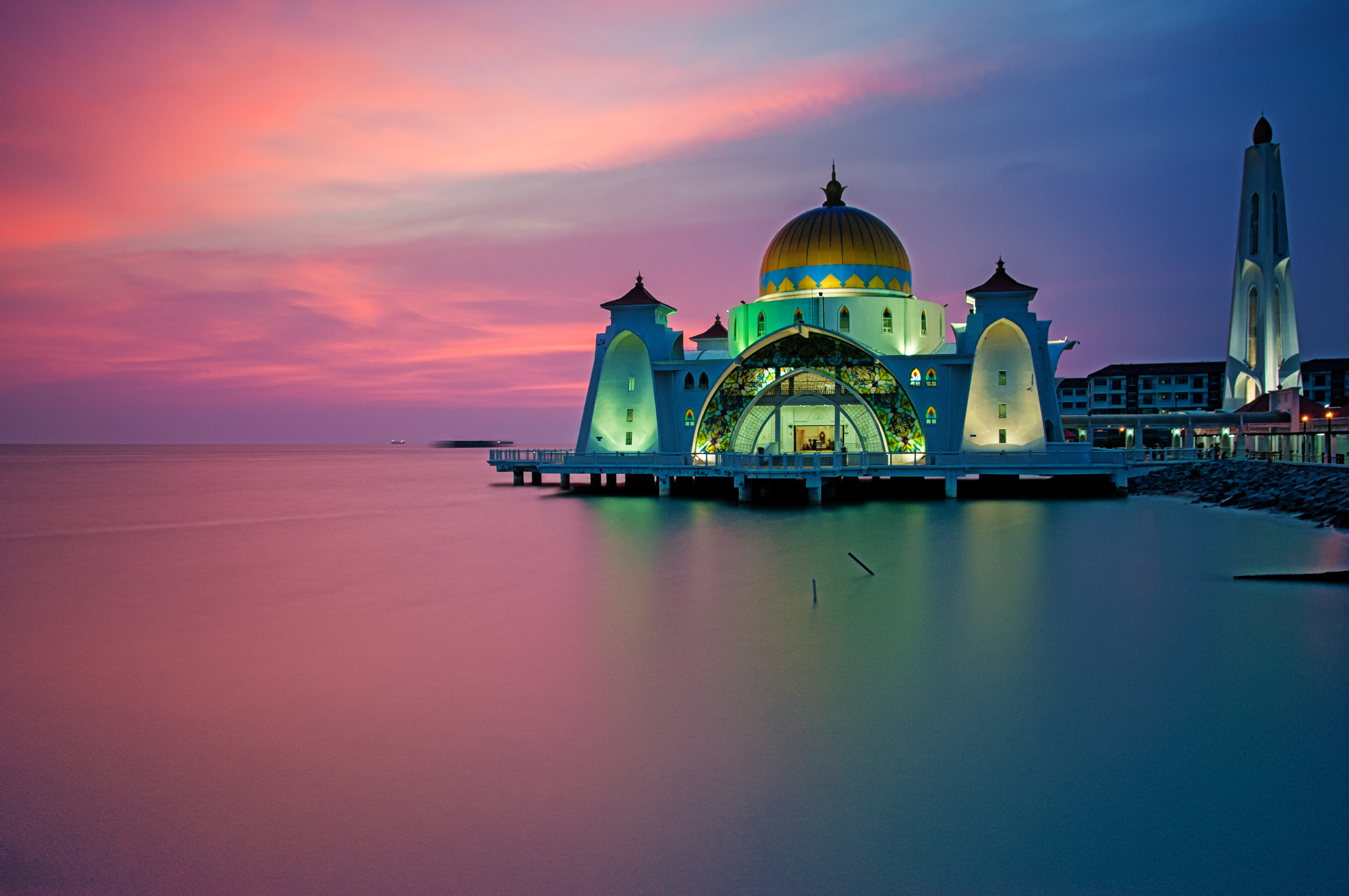
Melaka Straits Mosque, a newly built mosque in the city's metro area

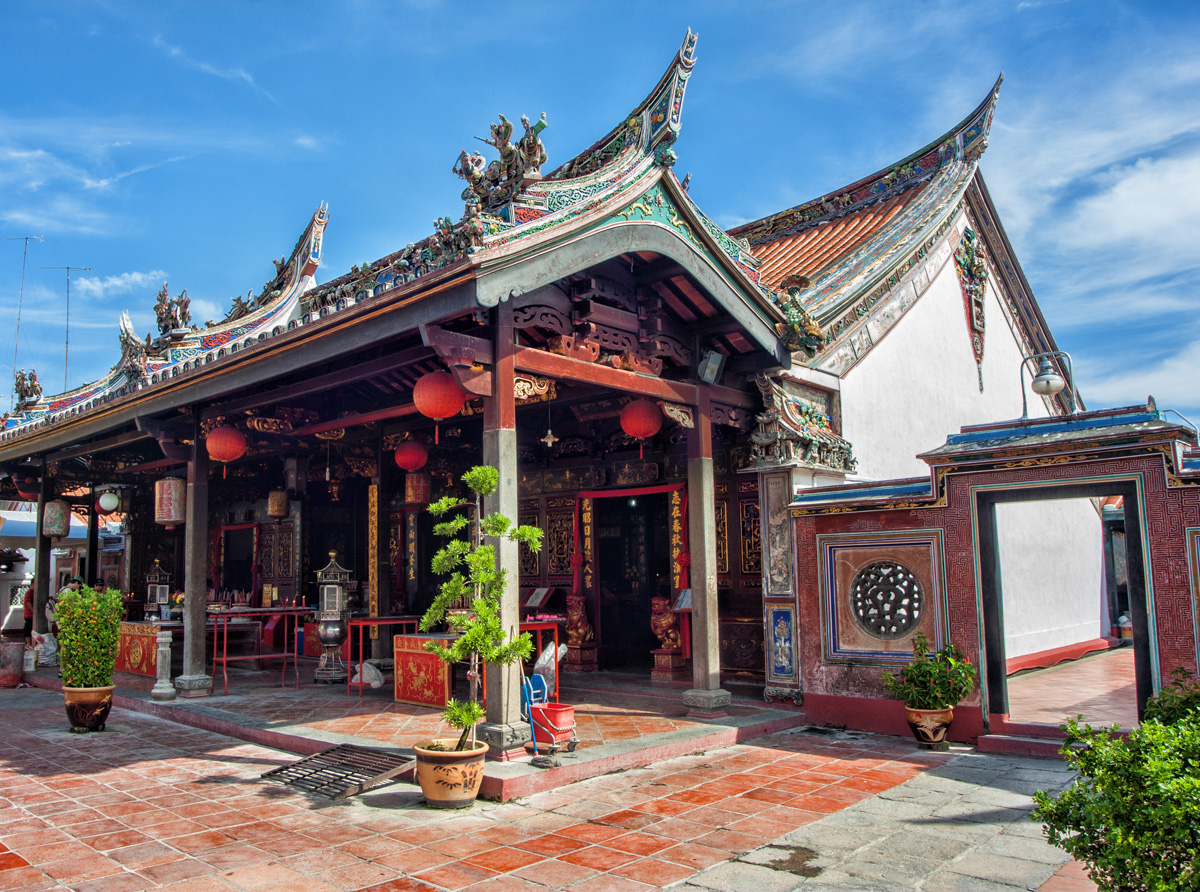
Cheng Hoon Teng Temple, a Chinese temple in the city

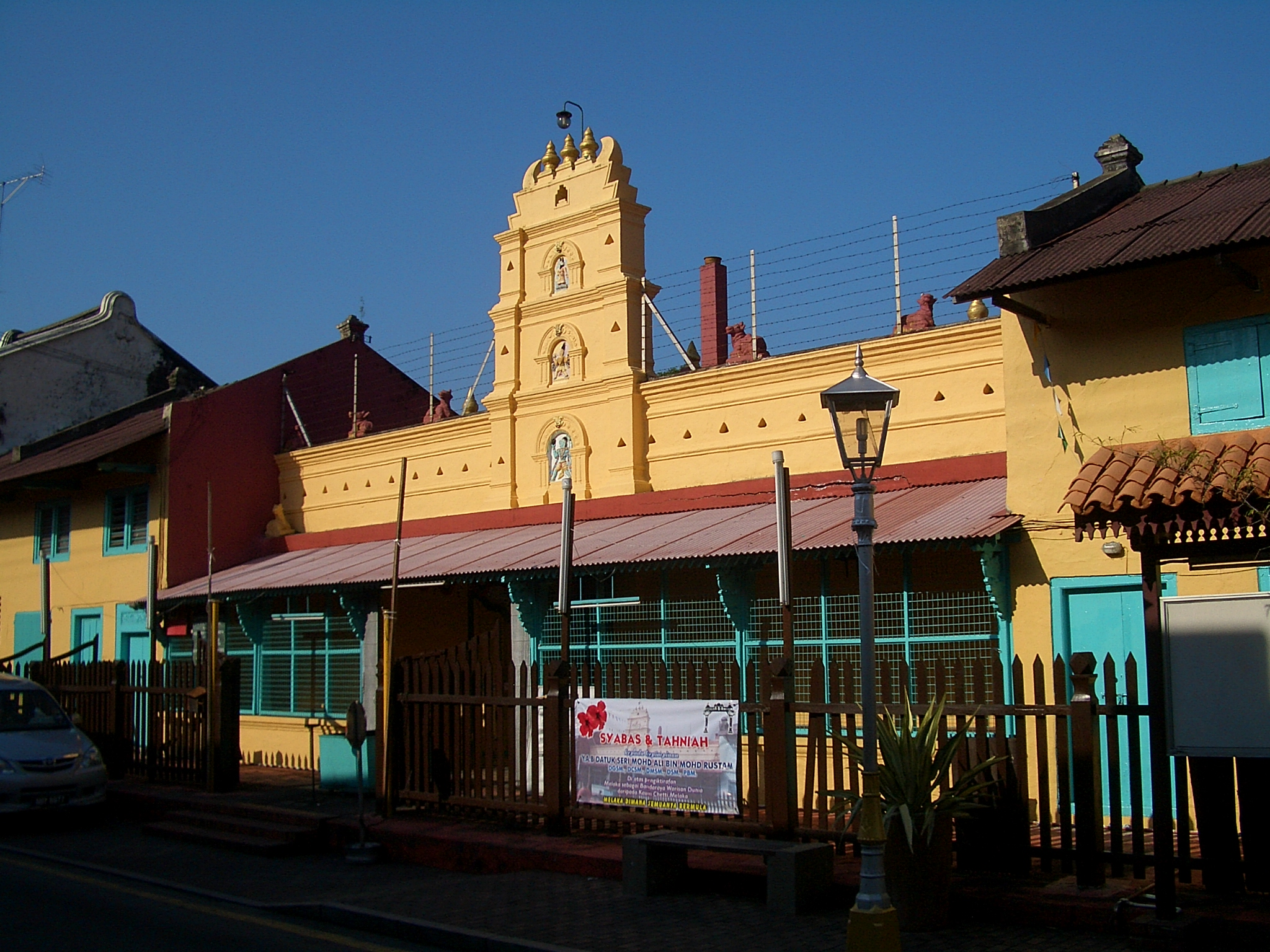
Sri Poyatha Moorthi Temple, the oldest Hindu temple in the city

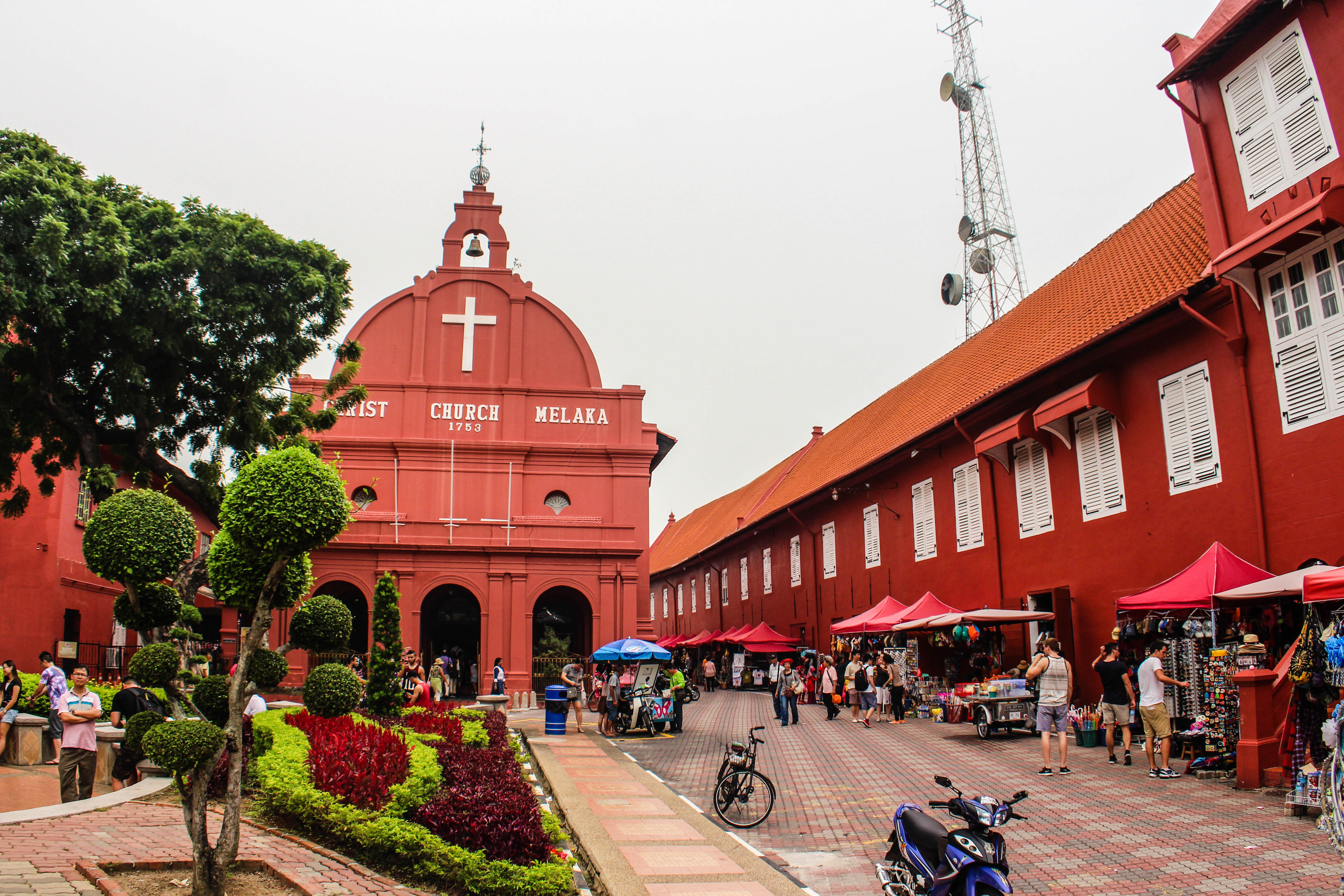
Christ Church, an Anglican church built by the Dutch in the 18th century.

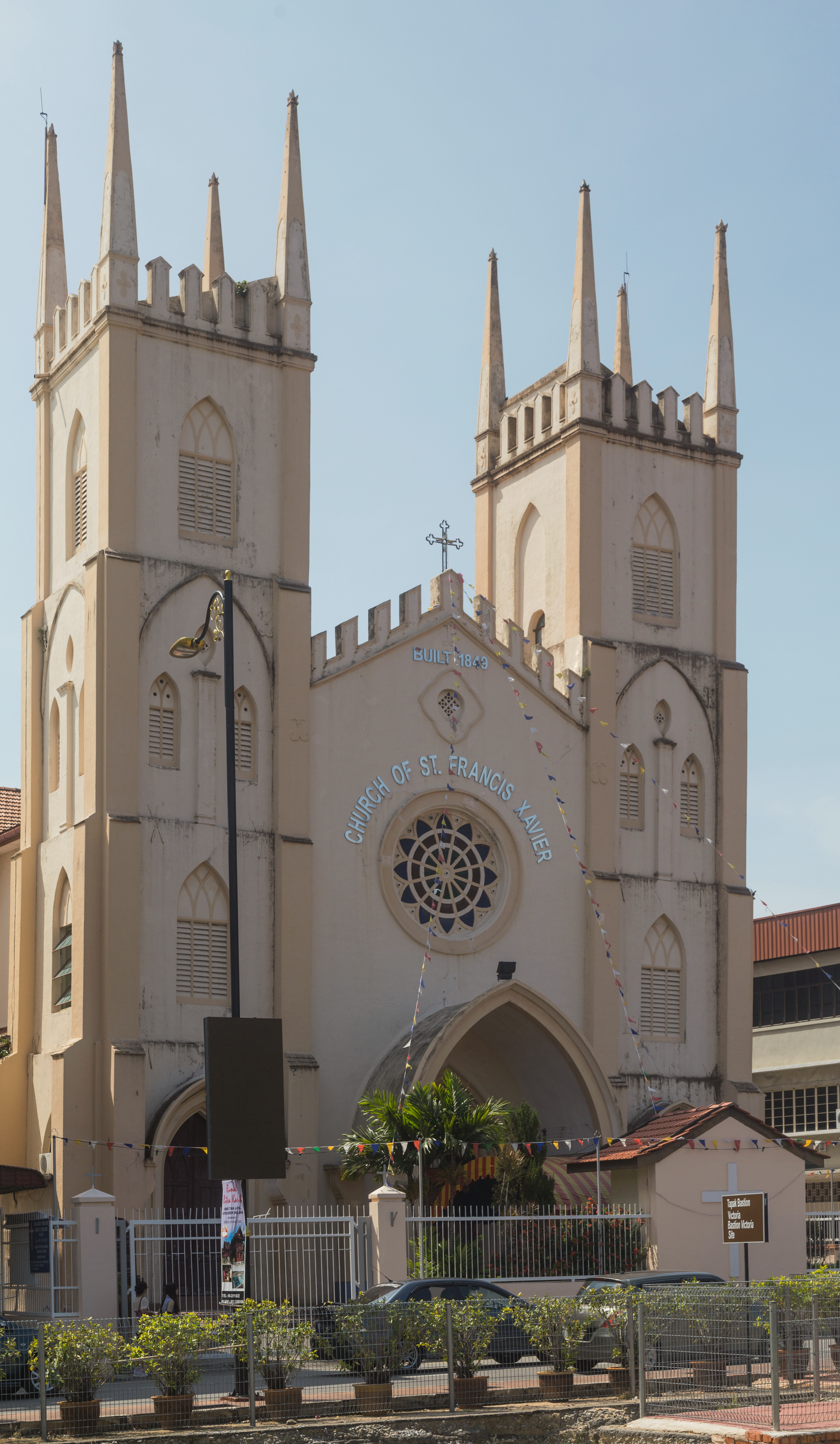
The Catholic church of St. Francis Xavier dates back to 1856

=== Languages ===
The main languages spoken in the city are Malay, Hokkien and English, although the Baba Nyonya and Chitty have their own variations of Baba and Chitties creoles respectively. The Malaccan Portuguese have their own version of Portuguese creole, known as Kristang language.

== Economy ==
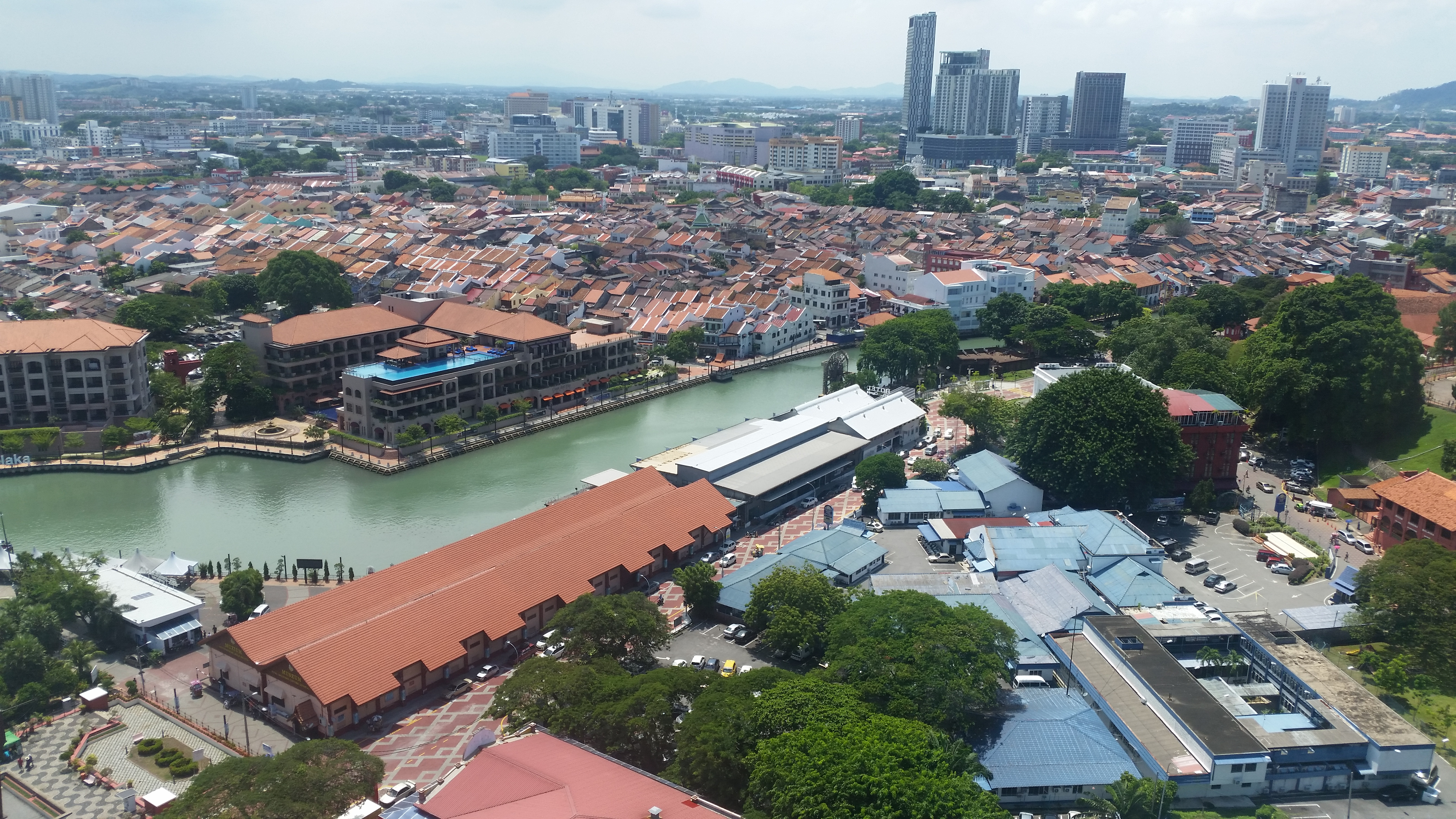
Malacca City Central Business District or Downtown (Malay: Bandar Hilir), an economic corridor that contains much of its financial and services sectors.

Since the era of Malacca Sultanate, the city has prospered as a successful entrepôt, putting it in the same position as Venice, Cairo and Canton. When the European conquest begin, Malacca had developed into a cosmopolitan city with a long-standing European heritage. The arrival of Chinese traders and coolie during the sultanate era and European colonisation saw a large boost to the economy, especially during the administration of Dutch and the British. In modern times, the tourism is more dominant than the primary-based industry due to its historical riches with the melting pots of cultural influences which attracted many local and foreign tourists to visiting the city, which also became part of the state economy income. In addition to its strategic location in the maritime Silk Road, the city benefited from the rise of China and India as world economic powers. Malacca City has hosted numerous national, regional and international conferences, congresses and trade fairs at the Melaka International Trade Centre (MITC) in Ayer Keroh. In early 2016, the Malacca state government has start to develop a new economic development area in the central city centre which will be known as the Hang Tuah Trade Centre that will encompassing trade centres, higher education, hospitality and business.

== Transport ==
=== Land ===
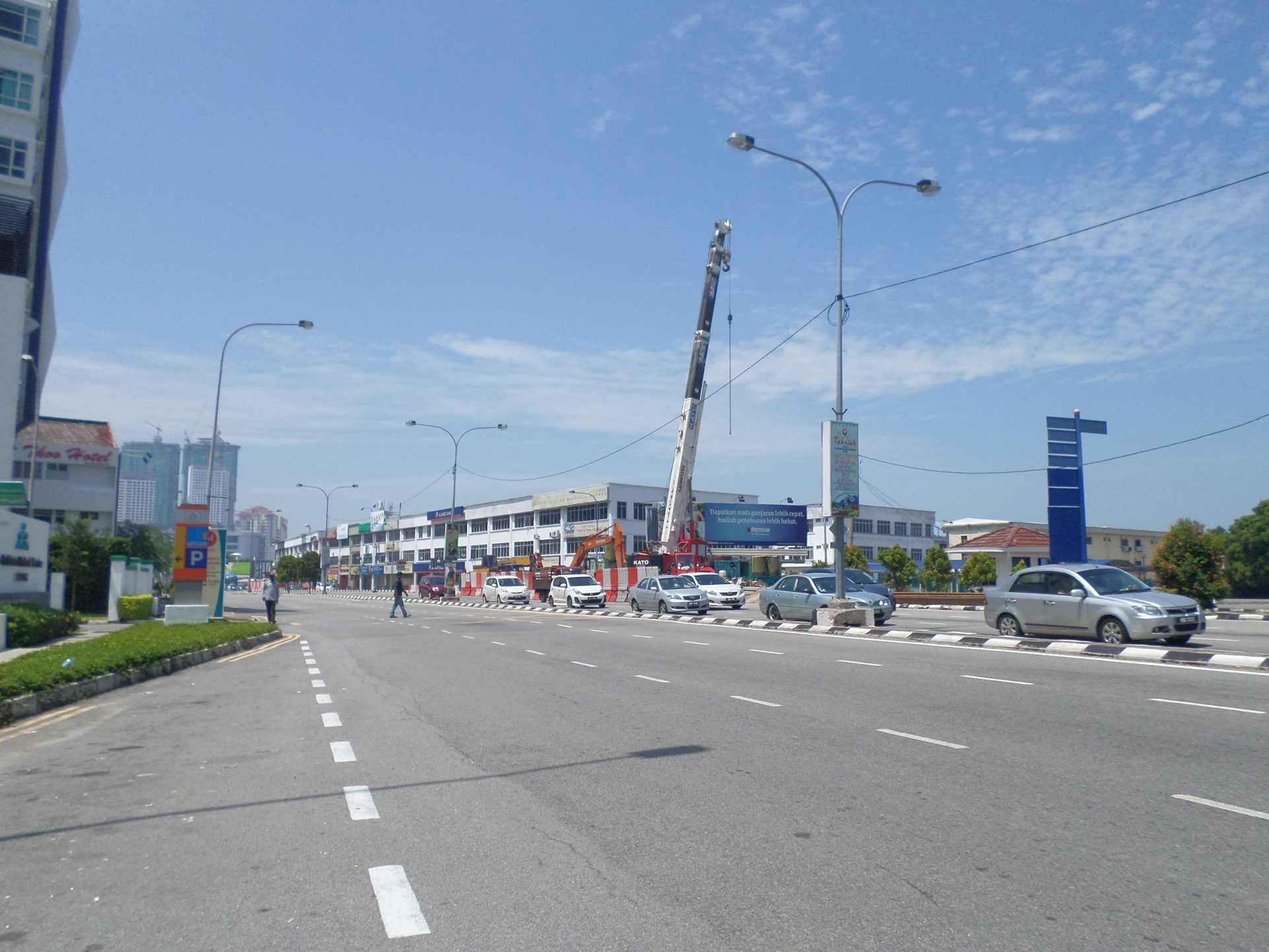
Syed Abdullah Aziz Road, a coastal road in the city

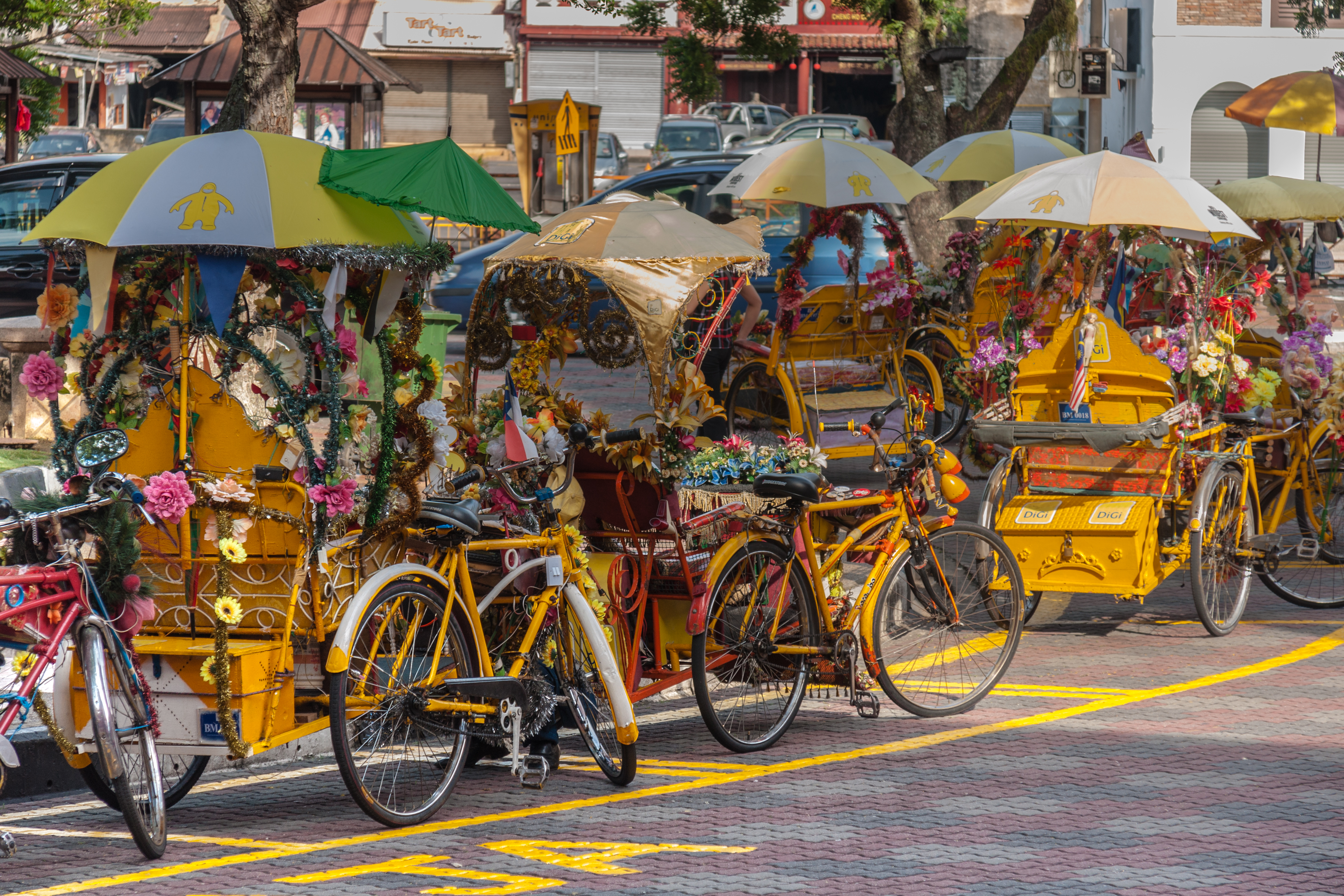
A trishaw service waiting for customers at Stadhuis Red Square

Internal roads linking different parts on the city are mostly federal roads constructed and maintained by the Malaysian Public Works Department. The city is accessible through the North–South Expressway and the coastal Syed Abdullah Aziz Road. There is also an old trunk road system, which once served as a main passageway to the city until the mid-1980s, when the North–South Expressway was built. In the old city centre, trishaw services are available through the Stadhuis Red Square. Started on 19 August 2023, closure of few roads in the city at 6pm–12am on Saturdays.

There was previously a proposal by the state government of Malacca to revive a bridge project named Malacca Strait Bridge that will connect land transportation in the city with the Indonesian city of Dumai on Sumatra island.

==== Public transport ====
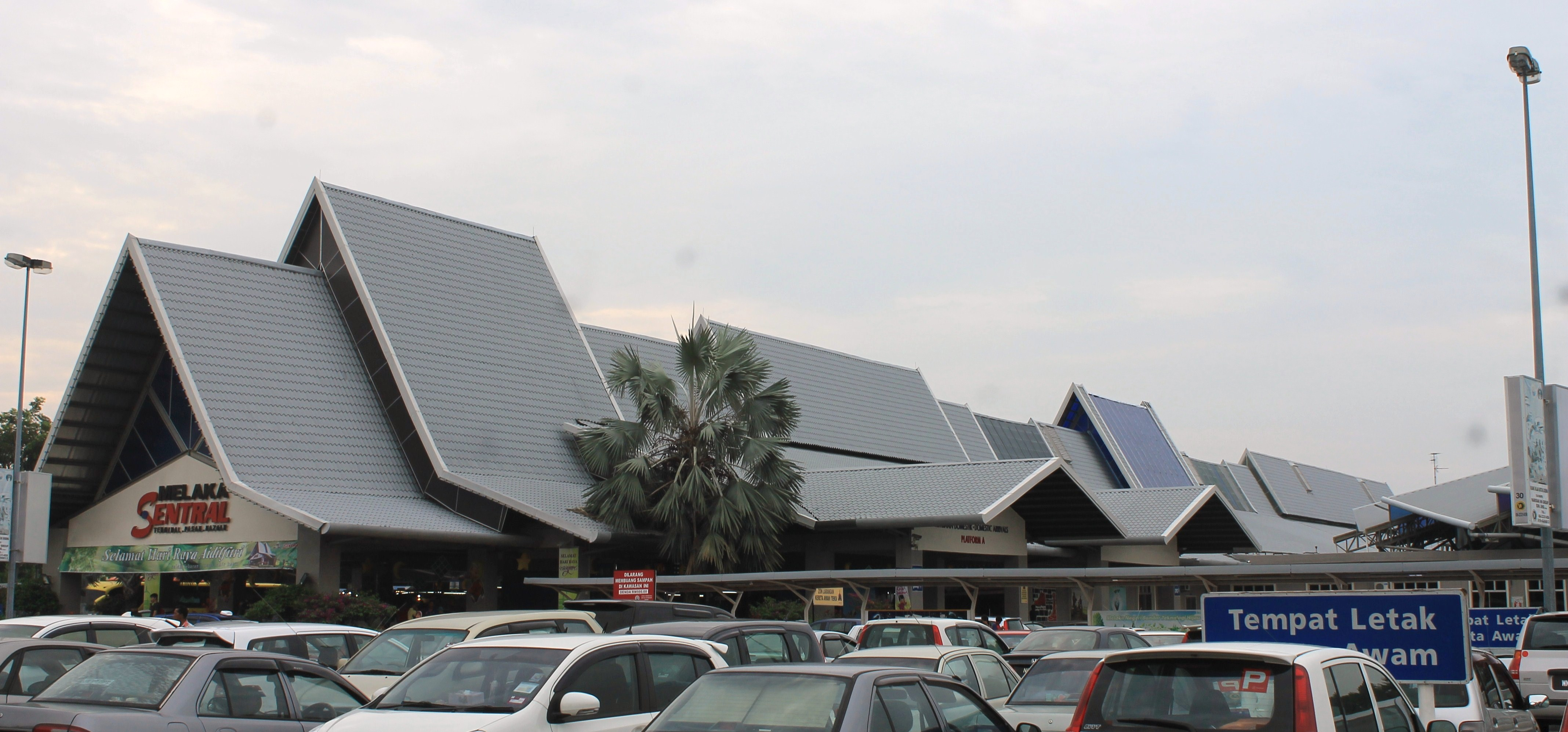
Melaka Sentral, the main public transportation terminal, serving bus and taxi services in and around the city

Melaka Sentral is the main bus and taxi terminal for the city, with services in and around the city as well as domestic services. Most taxis in the city are executive taxis with either four, six or fourteen seats; but only two types of taxis, the limousine (4 seats) and bas persiaran (14 seats), provide services to Singapore with the rest providing services only to other parts of Peninsular Malaysia.

There were railway tracks from Pulau Sebang to Malacca City before World War II, but these were dismantled by the Japanese for the construction of the Burmese Death Railway. On 10 October 2015, Keretapi Tanah Melayu Berhad (KTMB) commuter service has introduced a new route, shuttle service between Seremban-Sebang/Tampin-Gemas station.

A 1.6-km line of Malacca Monorail was launched in October 2010, served the route along the Malacca River. Due to several technical glitches months into its operation, the system was left idle in 2013. However, in June 2015 the Malacca State Government decided to revive the project. On 4 December 2017, Malacca Monorail has re-operate with enhanced safety features such as lightning-prevention devices and the addition of a rescue vehicle to attract wagons in the event of a technical problem. The previous incident is believed will not recur as tests had been performed for two months before re-operation. The Malacca Monorail operating hours are 10.00 am to 10.00 pm on weekdays and will be continued until 12.00 midnight on Saturdays and Sundays.

A tram system powered by compressed natural gas was due to open in 2012, but the news about the project appears to have dried up. A new plan with a different route was proposed in 2023.

=== Air transport ===
Malacca Airport is located 9 km (6 mi) north of the city centre. However, the airport only provides one direct flight to Singapore which is operated by Scoot. Kuala Lumpur International Airport is also located 135 km (84 mi) north west of Malacca.

=== Water ===
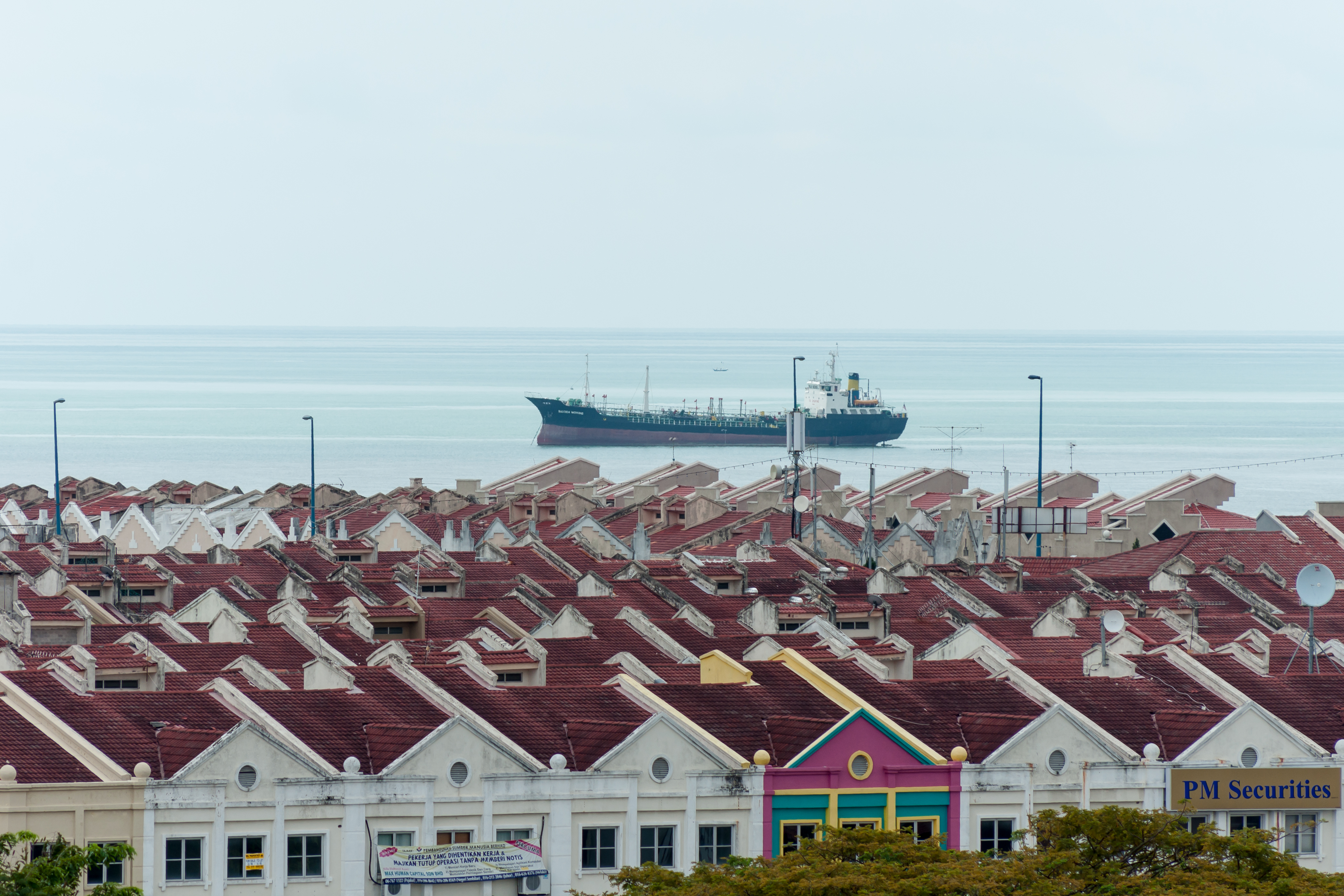
Ship anchoring at the Straits of Malacca, offshore from modern shopoffices constructed on reclaimed land.

The main water transportation in the city is the Malacca River Cruise with evening cruises along the Malacca River. The cruise route is an area marking the border between historic Chinatown and Malay area. The Melaka Gateway is a project under construction involving the development of one natural and two man-made islands off the coast of Malacca which will feature an international cruise terminal and aid water transport in the city. An international shipping port is also planned to be built as part of China's Maritime Silk Route economic belt.

== Other utilities ==
=== Courts of law and legal enforcement ===
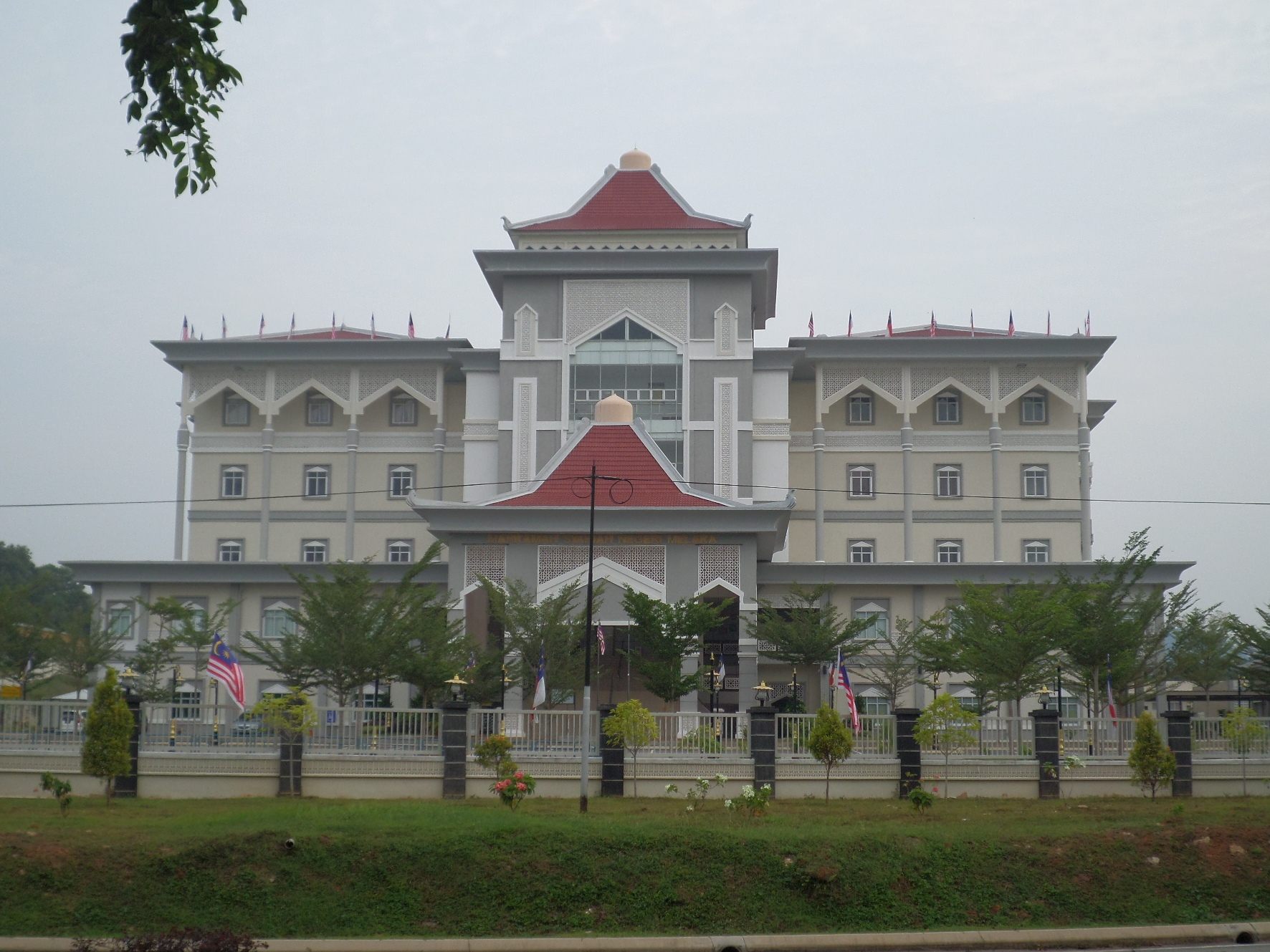
Malacca Syariah Court building

The city high court complex is located along Tun Abdul Razak Road, while another court for Sharia law is located on Old Ayer Keroh Road. The Malacca Police Contingent Headquarters is also located on Old Ayer Keroh Road. The main district police headquarters is located in Central Malacca. There are around thirteen police stations and eight police substations (Pondok Polis) serving the city. The main prison is located along the Ayer Keroh road, and was built in 1969. Another three prisons are located in the districts of Central Malacca, Tanjung Kling, Telok Mas and Sungai Udang. The Bandar Hilir Prison has been transformed into a museum with all the inmates moved to Sungai Udang Prison.

=== Healthcare ===
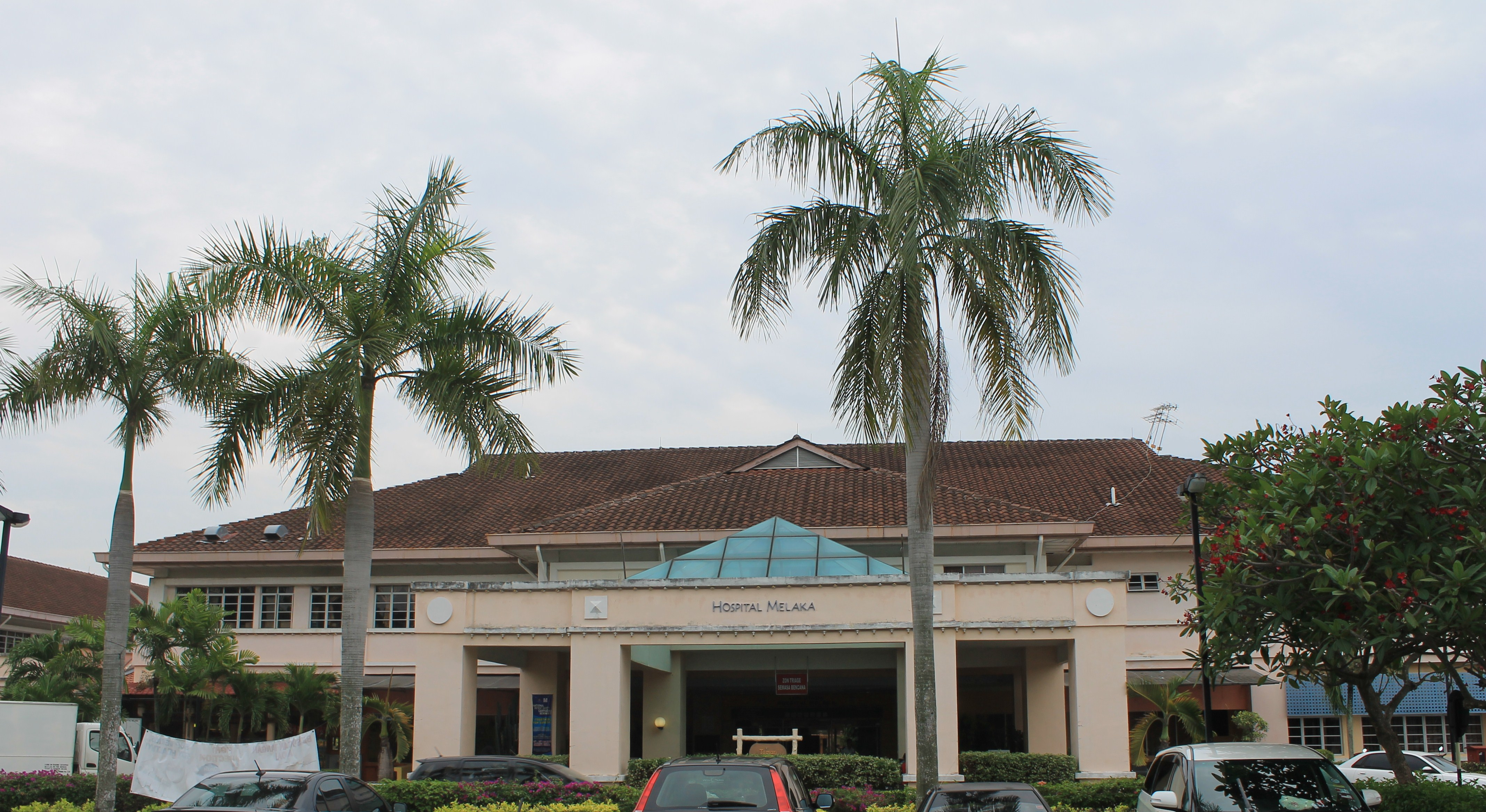
Malacca General Hospital main building

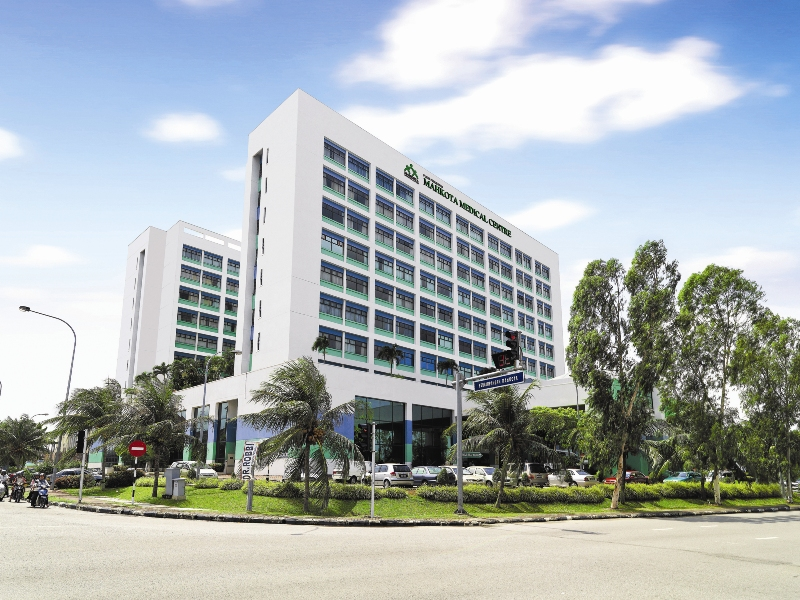
The Mahkota Medical Centre building, one of the largest private hospitals in the city

There is one public hospital and twelve government health clinics in and nearby the city. There are also 52 private clinics and three 1Malaysia clinics in Malacca City. Malacca General Hospital, which is located along Mufti Haji Khalil Road, is the main and oldest hospital in the state with 359 beds. Oriental Melaka Straits Medical Centre is the largest private hospital with 300 beds. Mahkota Medical Centre, located on Syed Abdul Aziz Road, is the second largest with 266 beds.

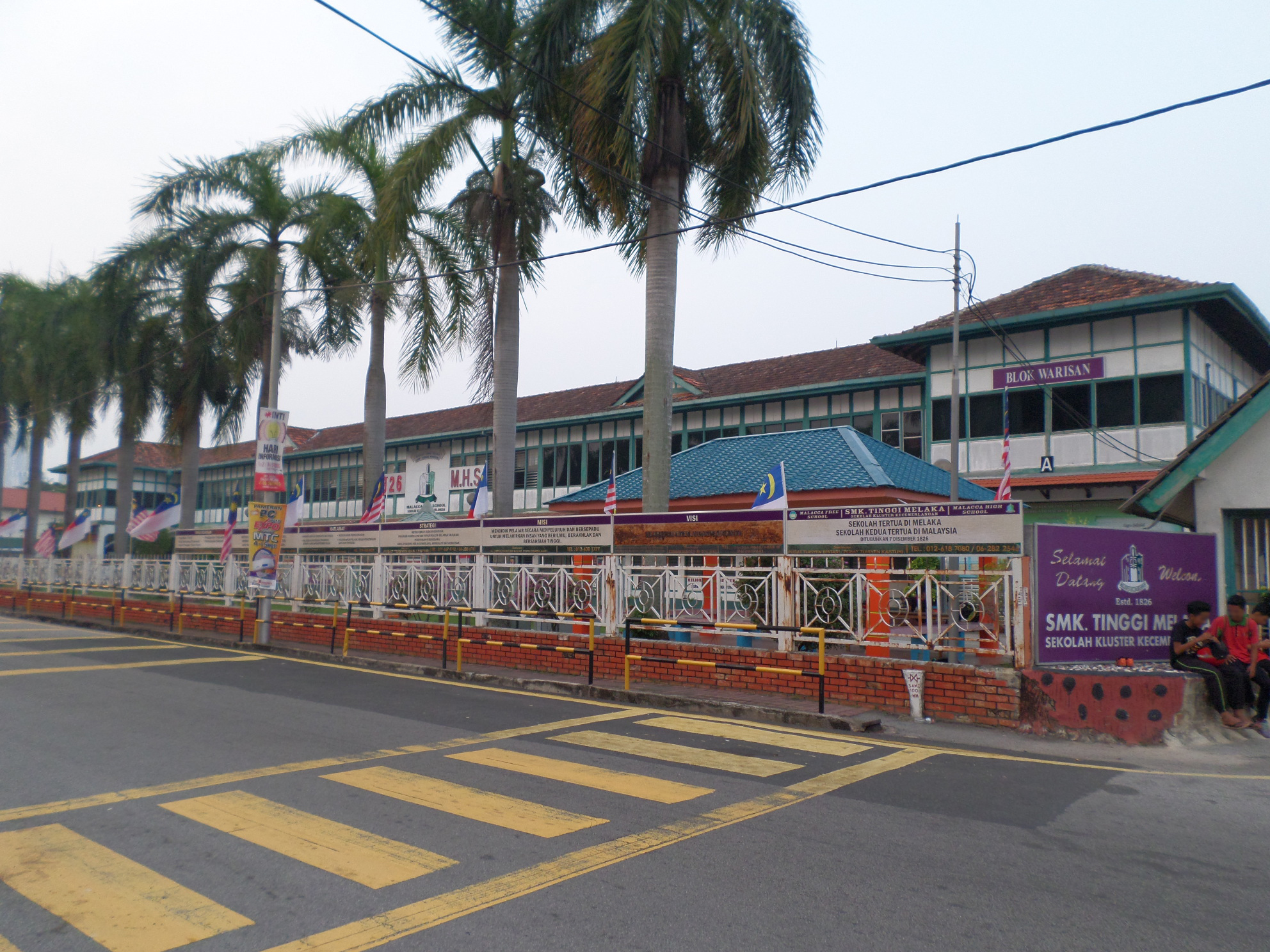
Malacca High School, the city's main secondary school

=== Education ===
Various government or state schools are available in the city. The secondary schools include the Malacca High School, Malacca Girls High School and Catholic High School. Other types of secondary schools such as religious, vocational, technical and fully residential schools are available inside and outside the city's metropolitan area. There are also a number of independent private schools in the city. These include Melaka International School, Wesley Methodist School and Pay Fong High School.

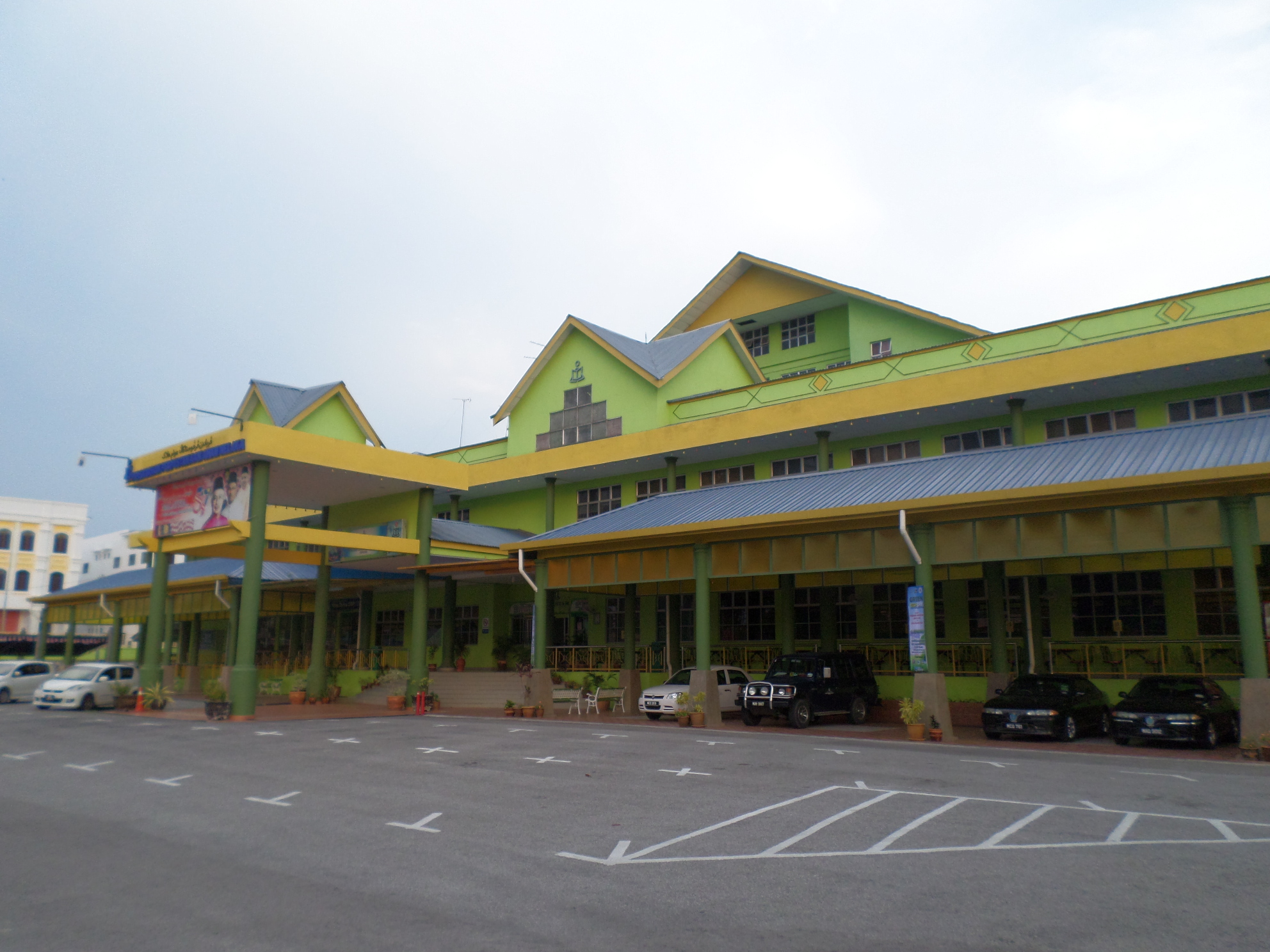
Malacca State Library

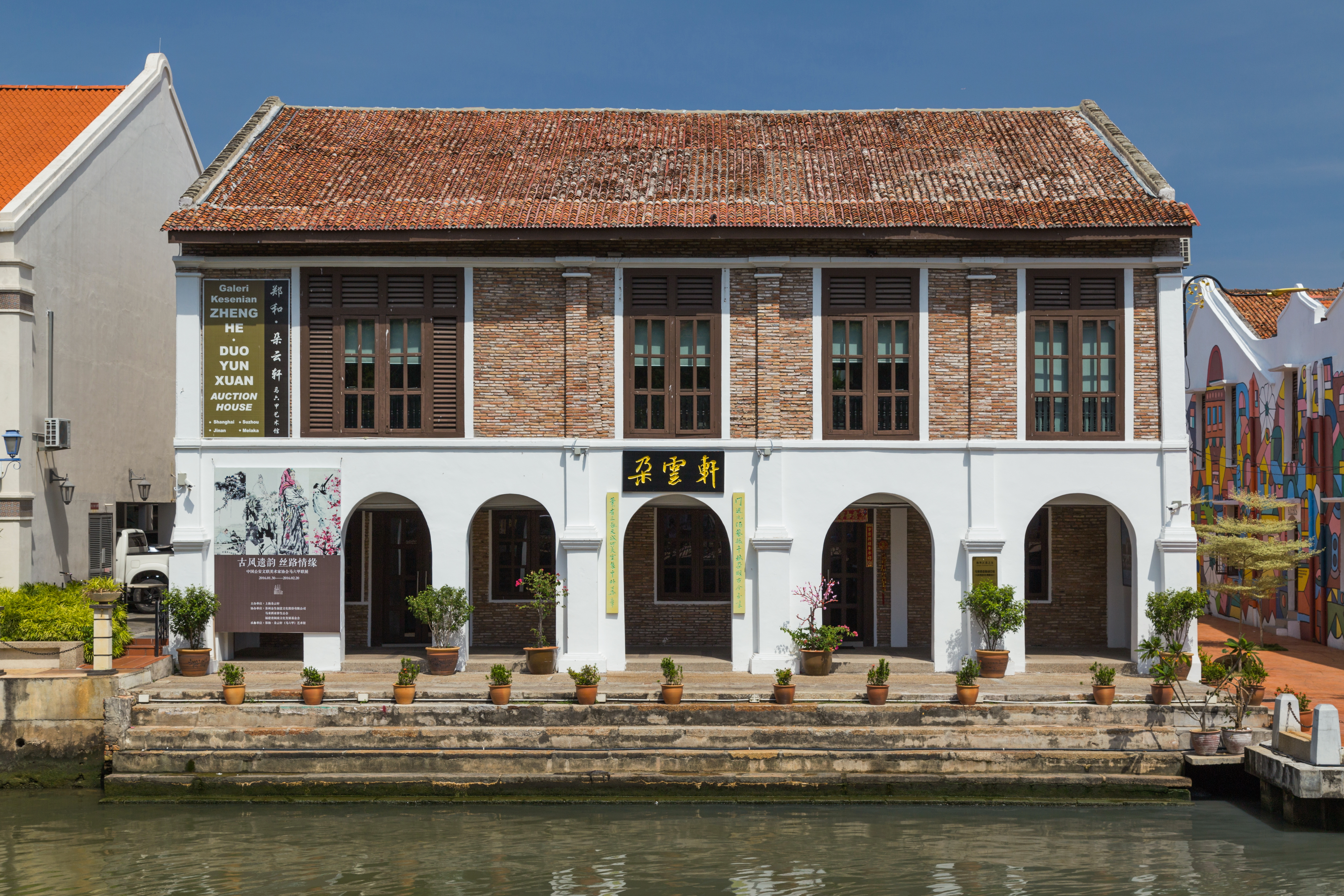
Sino-Portuguese architecture seen at the Zheng He Duo Yun Xuan Art Gallery 郑和朵云轩, Malacca City, Malaysia

==== Libraries ====
Malacca State Library is the main library of the State of Malacca, located in Bukit Baru town. Other public library branches are located in Telok Mas town, Kampung Padang, Bertam Hulu and Klebang town. There are also libraries available in the city's universities, schools and colleges.

== Culture ==
=== Arts ===
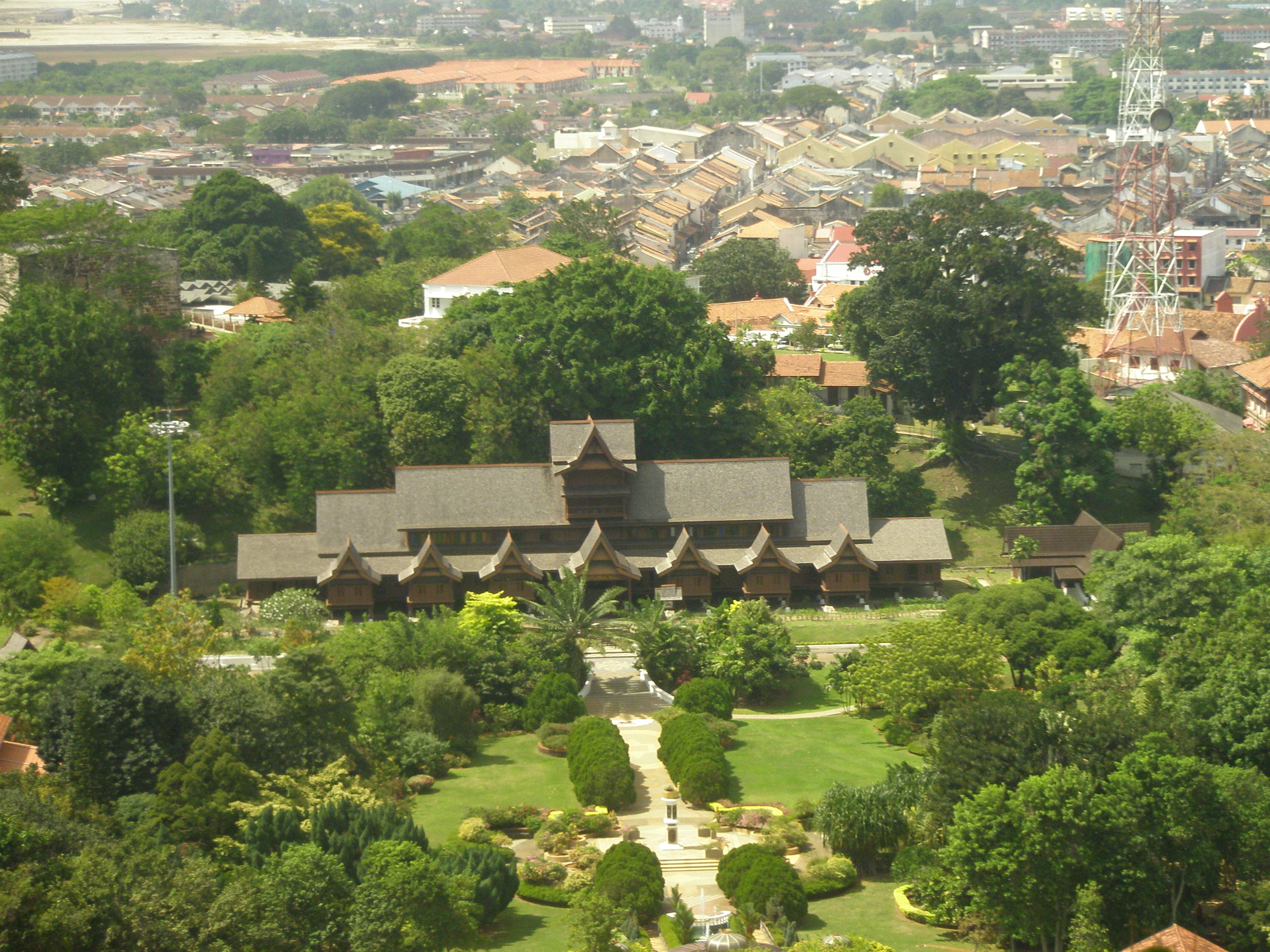
The replica of Malacca Sultanate Palace which is a museum

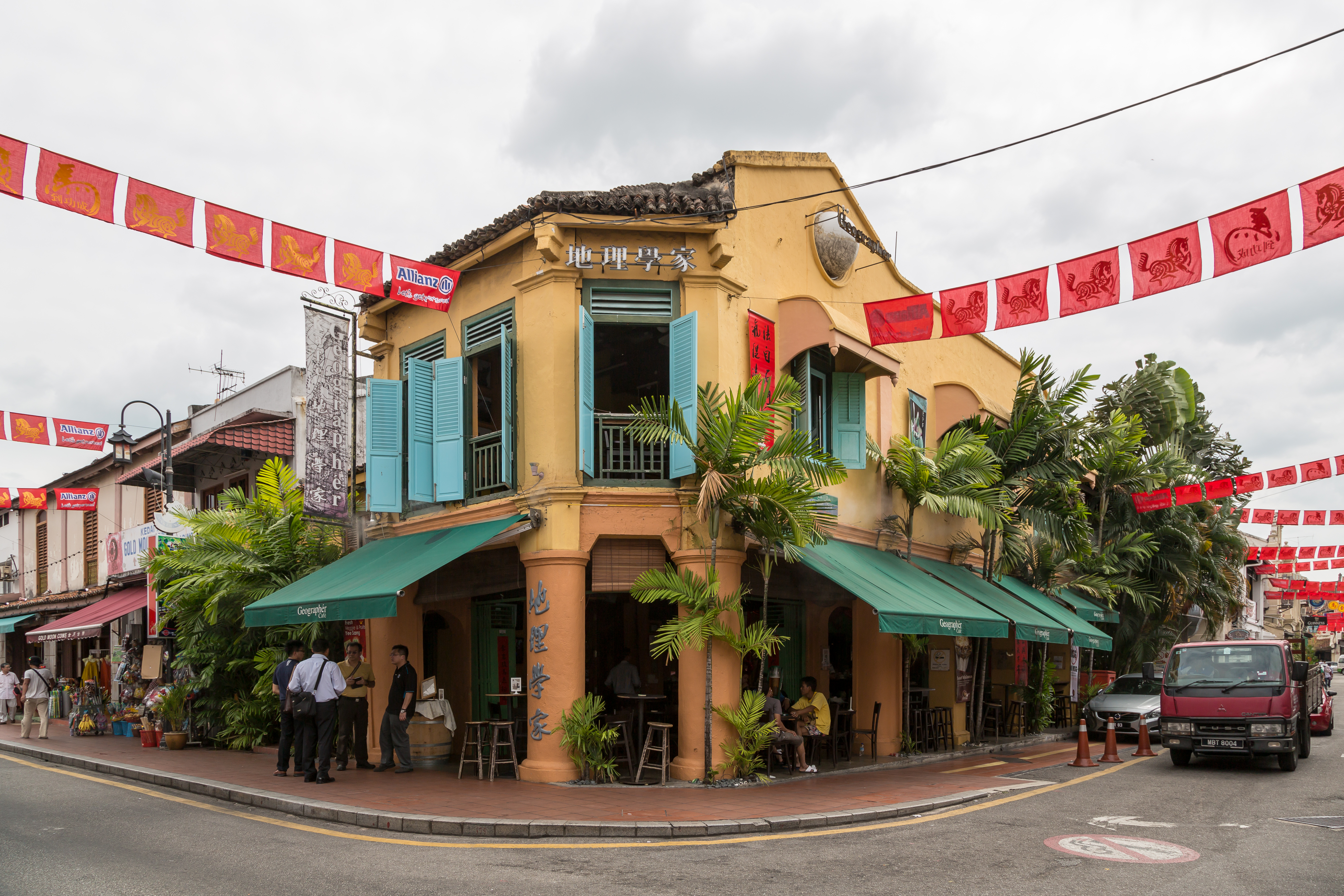
Café at Jonker Walk, part of Chinatown

The Malacca Sultanate Palace Museum, a replica of a classic Malacca Sultanate Palace, was built to represent the Malay culture and Malaccan history during the sultanate era. The building was constructed without using any nails. The city also includes a variety of other cultural attractions such as Chinatown, Little India and Portuguese Settlement. The Chinatown feature a strong Chinese cultural influences, with Clan associations, regional Chinese eateries and prominent Chinese Temples like Cheng Hoon Teng located around the areas where many Chinese traders have settling since the era of Sultanate of Malacca. The most recognisable part of the Chinatown is the Jonker Walk where many outdoor stage performances occur. The Kopitiam and restaurants around the city serve mixed cultural influences of Malay and Baba Nyonya as well as various regional Chinese cuisines such as Teochew and European cuisines. The No 8 Heeren Street Heritage Centre is an old two-storey shop house which has been undergoing restoration for years. The Cheng Ho Cultural Museum is the site where Zheng He, a famous Muslim Chinese voyager, was believed to have set up a large warehouse complex along the northern side of the Malacca River, while the Straits Chinese Jewellery Museum is a site where there has been a collection of Chinese jewellery design and motifs since the establishment of relations between Malacca and the Ming dynasty of China. Little India is the site where Indian culture is presented with a variety of Indian shops and restaurants as well as fabric shops selling various saris, Punjabi suits and other Indian fabric designs. Located within the Portuguese settlement is a "Mini Lisbon" which has become the city's centre of Portuguese culture, with many Eurasians descended from marriages between Portuguese men and local women that took place after the Portuguese conquest of Malacca residing there. The state of the art Encore Melaka theatre, located at Taman Kota Syahbandar on newly reclaimed land, occasionally exhibits cultural and musical shows.

==== Historical ====
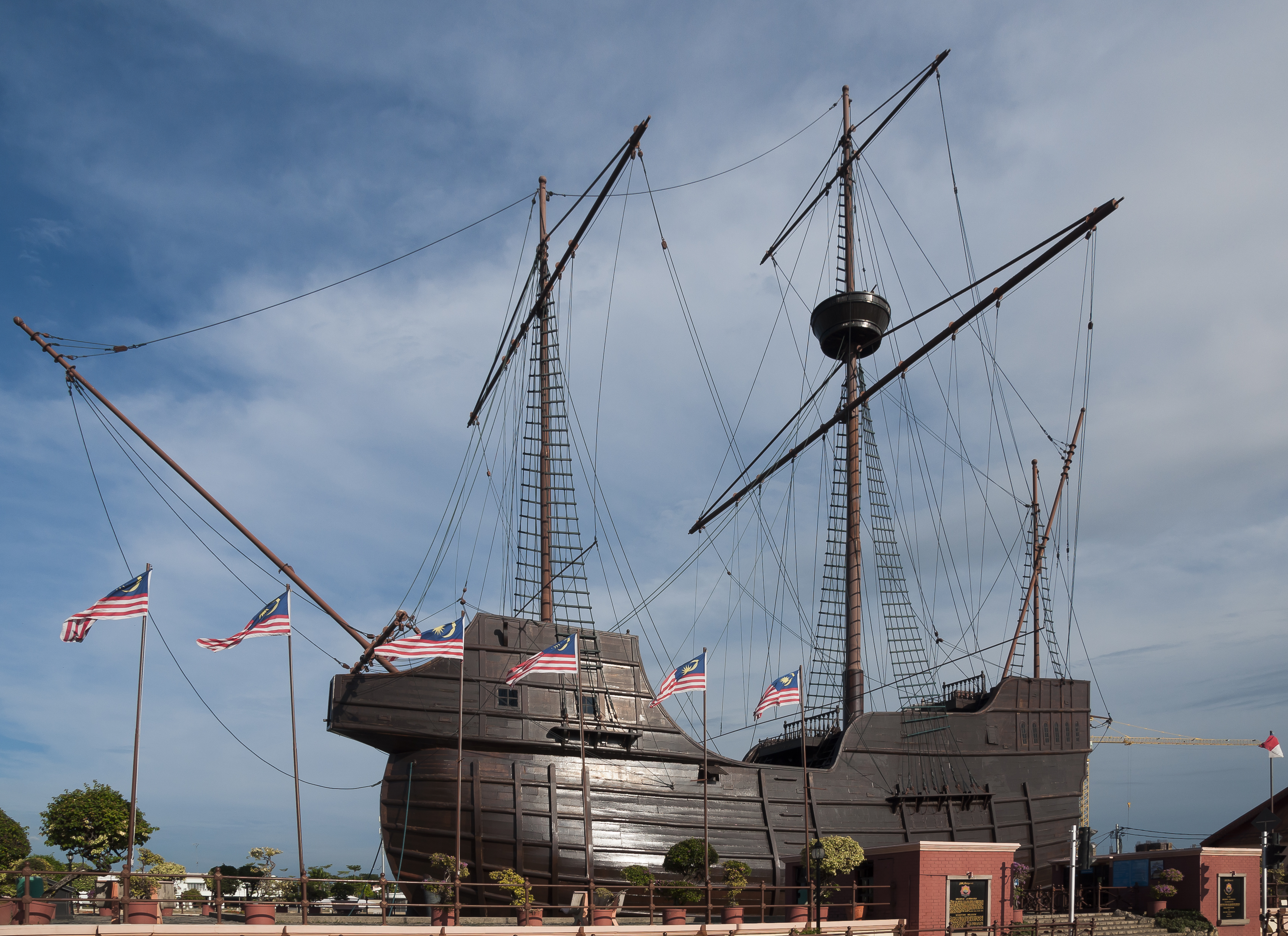
The replica of a 1502 Portuguese ship, the Flor de la Mar

The Dutch Square is an area surrounded by Dutch buildings such as the Stadthuys, Christ Church, British Queen Victoria Fountain, and Chinese settlers structure of Tan Beng Swee Clock Tower in honour of a generous late Chinese tycoon, Tan Beng Swee. The original clock tower was imported from England but has since been replaced with the one from Japan. The Portuguese traces are mostly on Porta do Santiago which can also be seen across the square on the bank of Malacca River and on St. Peter's Church. The Kuomintang Cenotaph (Malacca Warrior Monument) in Bukit Cina is a memorial where thousands of Chinese people in Malacca were killed by the Japanese during their occupation.

==== Leisure and conservation areas ====
Malacca Zoo is the main zoo in the city metropolitan, featuring 215 species of birds, mammals, reptiles and amphibians including the Sumatran rhinoceros, the Malayan gaur, Serow and the Indochinese tiger. An oceanarium located inside the Shore shopping malls complex features a variety of fish species and other sea creatures.

==== Other attractions ====
Other attractions include the Maritime Museum, Taming Sari Tower and Macau Gallery Melaka. The Maritime Museum features a replica of a historical ship, the Flor de la Mar, and describes the trading history of Malacca, while the Taming Sari offers a scenic view of the city centre. The Padang Pahlawan is the site where Tunku Abdul Rahman, the father of Malayan independence, made his first independence announcement. St. Paul's Hill is where the Governor's Museum, Malacca Literature Museum and Malacca Light are located.

==== Shopping ====
A number of shopping malls and traditional art and craft shops are available around the city, with the most popular shopping malls being Dataran Pahlawan Melaka Megamall, The Shore, and the ÆON Bandaraya Melaka and JUSCO shopping centres.

==== Entertainment ====
The main cinemas in the city are the Golden Screen Cinemas (GSC), with one located inside the building of Dataran Pahlawan Malacca Megamall with a capacity of 2,004, while the second largest, in ÆON Bandaraya Melaka, has a capacity of 1,793. Another cinema, known as the MBO Cinemas, with a capacity of 1,212 is located in the MBO Melaka Mall.

=== Sports ===
The second largest football stadium in the state of Malacca, Hang Tuah Stadium, is located in the city; it has a capacity of around 15,000 and is the oldest stadium in the state. The stadium is the second home ground for Melaka United, after Hang Jebat Stadium in Krubong.

== Twin towns and sister cities ==
Malacca first started twinning in 1984 with the city of Lisbon, Portugal and it is now twinned with or established as a friendship city with the following cities:

- Valparaíso, Chile.
- Changsha, China.
- Guangdong, China.
- Nanjing, China.
- Vigan, Philippines.
- Kota Tua Jakarta, Indonesia.
- Padang Panjang, Indonesia.
- Sawahlunto, Indonesia.
- Kuala Lumpur, Malaysia.
- Hoorn, Netherlands.
- Lisbon, Portugal.

== See also ==
- Malaccamax
