= List of mosques in Malaysia =

The construction of mosques in Malaysia has been documented since the influx of Arab, Chinese and Indian traders. Islam is the majority religion in Malaysia. In 2026 , there were around 21.8 million population Muslim, or 63.4% of the total population of Malaysia.

As 2026, they are more than 6,851 mosques are build around malaysia with Sabah are most of them with 1,141 mosques. There also have a musolla or surau are provided in every place around malaysia.

This list contains famous mosques in Malaysia.

Name	Picture	City	Province	Established
National Mosque of Malaysia		Kuala Lumpur	Kuala Lumpur	1965
Sultan Salahuddin Abdul Aziz Mosque		Shah Alam	Selangor	1982
Albukhary Mosque		Alor Setar	Kedah	2001
Alaeddin Mosque		Jugra	Selangor	1918
Sultan Idris Shah II Mosque		Ipoh	Perak	1966
Sultan Abdul Samad Jamek Mosque		Kuala Lumpur	Kuala Lumpur	1909
Sultan Ismail Petra Mosque		Rantau Panjang	Kelantan	2005
Kampung Keling Mosque		Melaka	Melaka	1748
Kampung Laut Mosque		Kota Bharu	Kelantan	1730
Kampung Hulu Mosque		Melaka	Melaka	1728
Al-Azim Mosque		Melaka	Melaka	1984
Negeri Sembilan State Mosque		Seremban	Negeri Sembilan	1965
Sabah State Mosque		Kota Kinabalu	Sabah	1970
Penang State Mosque		George Town	Penang	1977
Crystal Mosque		Kuala Terengganu	Terengganu	2006
Putra Mosque		Putrajaya	Putrajaya	1997
Federal Territory Mosque		Kuala Lumpur	Kuala Lumpur	1998
Kota Kinabalu Mosque		Kota Kinabalu	Sabah	1993
Asy-Syakirin Mosque		Kuala Lumpur	Kuala Lumpur	1996
Malacca Straits Mosque		Melaka	Melaka	2006
Sultan Ahmad Shah Mosque		Kuantan	Pahang	1991
Ubudiah Mosque		Kuala Kangsar	Perak	1913
Zahir Mosque		Alor Setar	Kedah	1912
Malacca Chinese Mosque		Krubong	Melaka	2012
Abdul Rahman Auf Mosque		Kuala Lumpur	Kuala Lumpur	1987
Masjid Raya Tawau		Tawau	Sabah	2015
Al-Rahman Mosque		Kuala Lumpur	Kuala Lumpur	1962
Al-Amaniah Mosque		Selayang	Selangor	1997
Abidin Mosque		Kuala Terengganu	Terengganu	1793
Sultan Sulaiman Mosque		Klang	Selangor	1932
Tranquerah Mosque		Melaka	Melaka	1728
Sultan Abu Bakar State Mosque		Johor Bahru	Johor	1892
Albukhary Mosque KL		Kuala Lumpur	Kuala Lumpur	2006
Masjid Jamek Razaleigh		Gua Musang District	Kelantan	2022
Masjid Tengku Razaleigh		Gua Musang District	Kelantan	1940s

== Chinese style ==
Chinese mosques in Malaysia architecture combine elements of Chinese culture with Islamic values. Chinese mosques in Malaysia reflect the country's cultural diversity. By combining elements of traditional Chinese architecture with the function of a mosque, it shows how cultural identity can be preserved in a religious context. This not only enriches the country's architectural heritage but also strengthens the relationship between the various ethnic communities in Malaysia.

Name	Image	City	Year
Al-Khairiah Mosque, aka Mosque of a Thousand Prayers		Pulau Pangkor, Perak	1926
Jubli Perak Sultan Ismail Petra Mosque		Rantau Panjang, Kelantan	2009
Muhammadiah Mosque		Ipoh, Perak	2013
Malacca Chinese Mosque		Krubong, Melaka	2014
Klang Chinese Muslim Jamek Mosque		Klang, Selangor	2024

== See also ==
- Islam in Malaysia
- Lists of mosques

== Author ==
Shabbir Rifat (2012) List Of Mosque In Malaysia
