= Malacca Chinese Mosque =

Mosque in Central Melaka, Melaka, Malaysia

- Masjid Cina Negeri Melaka; مسجد چينا نڬري ملاك; 马六甲华人清真寺
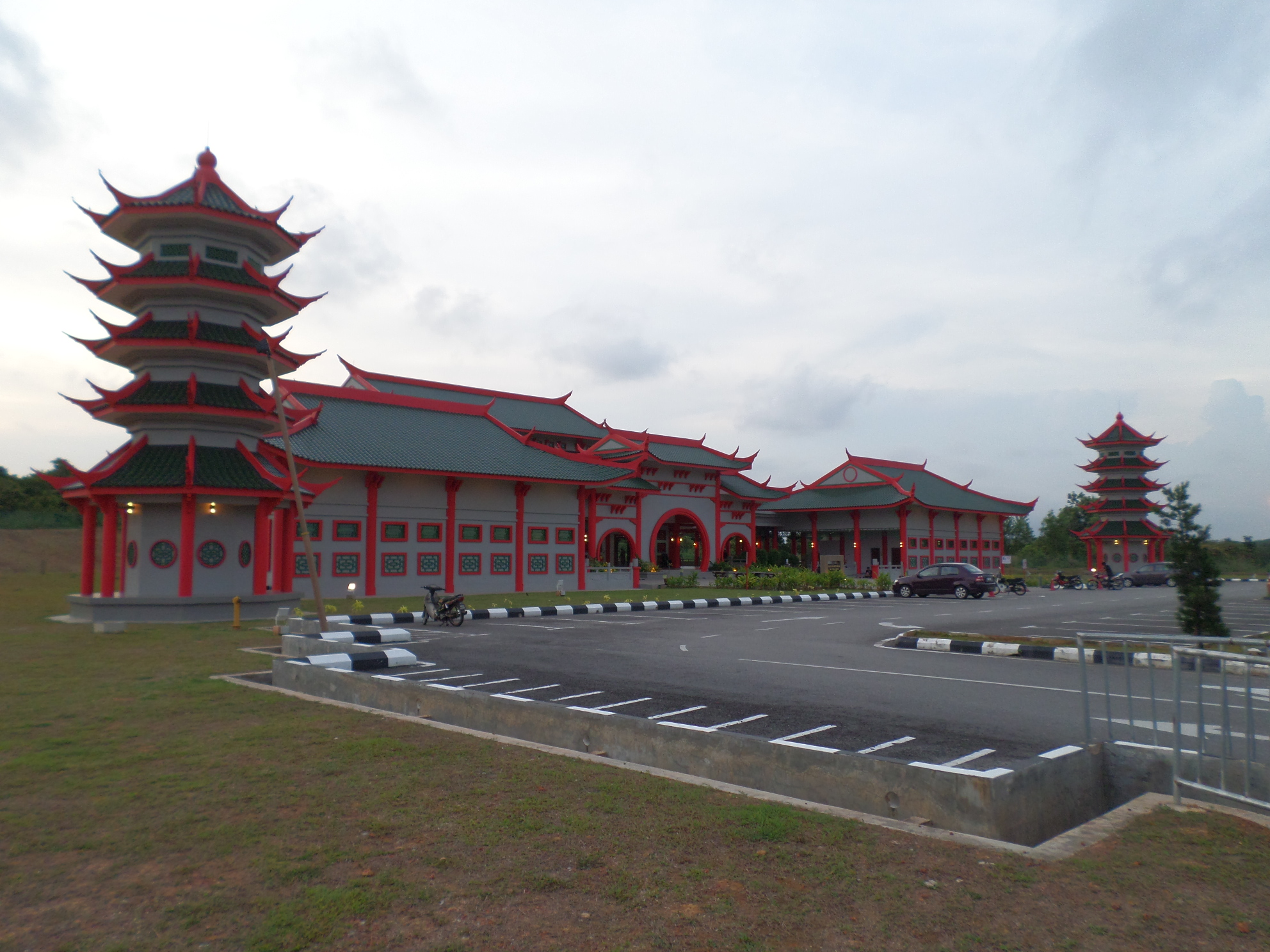

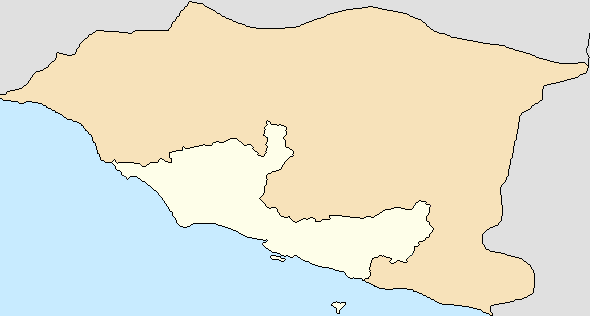
- Location within Malacca City

Religion
- Affiliation: Islam
- Branch/tradition: Sunni
- Ownership: Malacca Chinese Muslim Association (PERTIM)
- Governing body: Malacca Chinese Muslim Association (PERTIM)

Location
- Location: Krubong, Malacca, Malaysia
- Interactive map of Malacca Chinese Mosque
- Coordinates: 2°17′45.4″N 102°13′48.9″E

Architecture
- Type: mosque
- Style: Chinese
- Completed: April 2014
- Construction cost: RM7.5 million

Specifications
- Capacity: 2,000 worshipers
- Dome: 2
- Minaret: 1

Malacca Chinese Mosque (Malay: Masjid Cina Negeri Melaka; Jawi: مسجد چينا نڬري ملاك; Chinese: 马六甲华人清真寺; pinyin: Mǎliùjiǎ huárén qīngzhēnsì) is a Chinese-style mosque in Krubong, Central Melaka District, Malacca, Malaysia. It is the third such mosque in Malaysia after the ones in Kelantan and Perak and was developed by the Malacca Chinese Muslim Association (Pertim). Its construction budget was approved by Deputy Prime Minister Muhyiddin Yassin in October 2011, while its construction was started in August 2012 by Warisan Harmoni Construction Sdn. Bhd. and completed in April 2014. The construction of the mosque cost 7.5 million Malaysian ringgits, with RM5.9 million provided by the federal government and the remaining by Pertim and the public.

The mosque has a unique Chinese architecture design with pagodas and Chinese calligraphy from a combination of architectural design of several mosques in Beijing, Shanghai and Xi'an in China. It has one minaret tower and two domes and is equipped with the main prayer hall, library, multipurpose hall, offices, koi ponds and a restaurant inside. With a total built up area of 2.8 hectares (6.9 acres), the mosque can accommodate up to 2,000 worshipers.

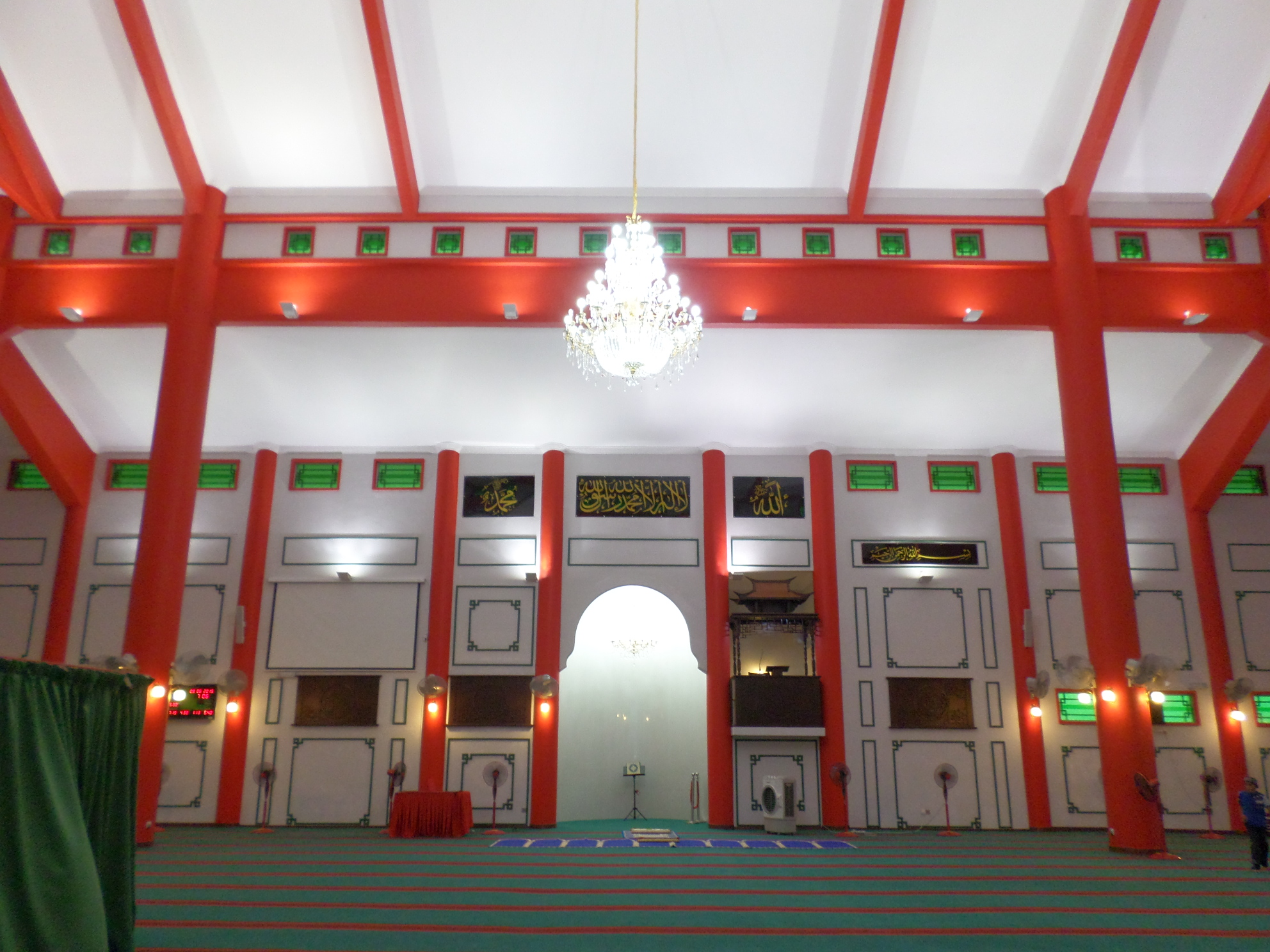
Malacca Chinese Mosque prayer hall

== See also ==
- Islam in Malaysia
- List of mosques in Malaysia in a Chinese style
- Sultan Ismail Petra Silver Jubilee Mosque – Mosque in Pasir Mas, Kelantan, Malaysia
