= Penang State Mosque =

State mosque in Penang, Malaysia

- Masjid Negeri Pulau Pinang مسجد نڬري ڤولاو ڤينڠ
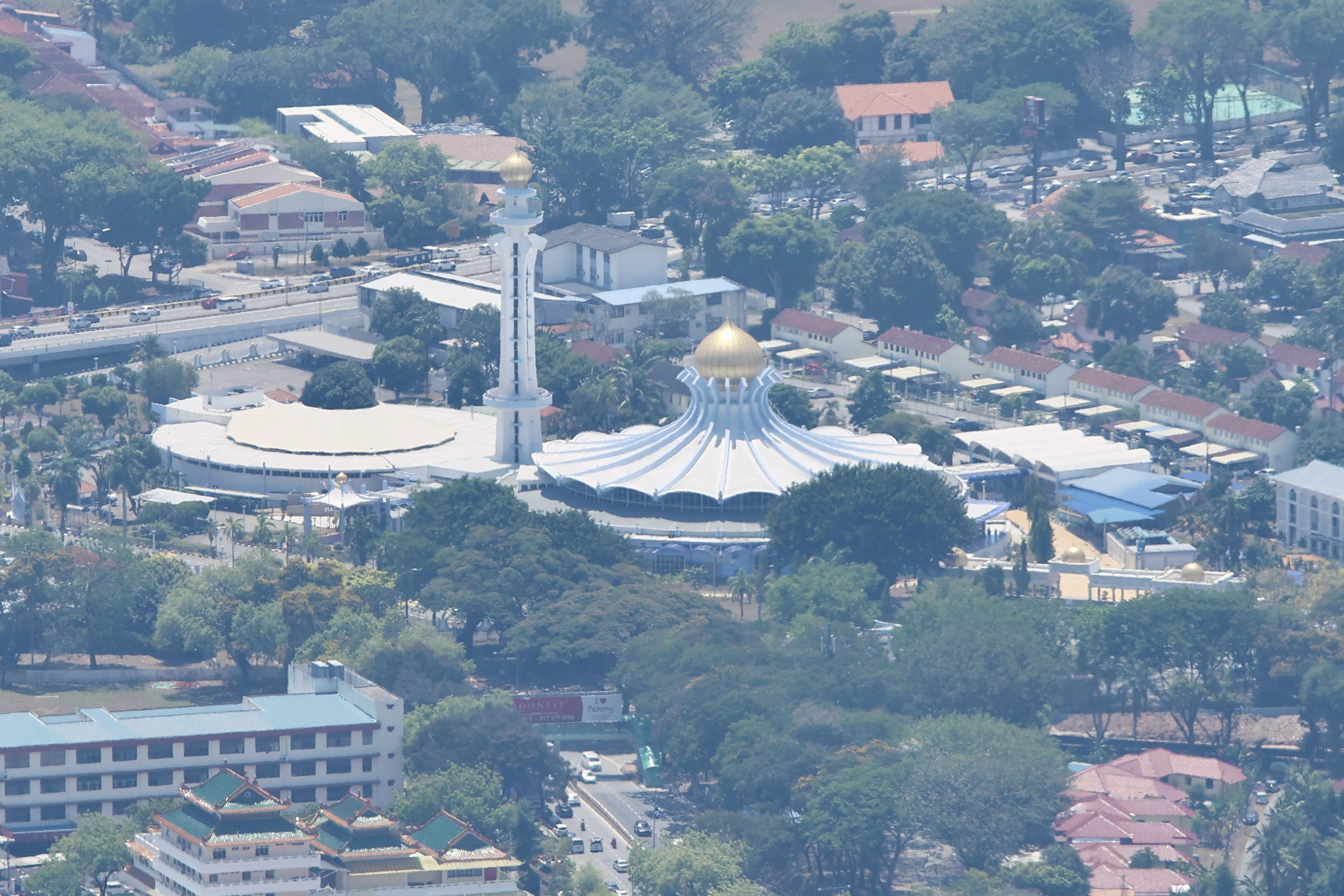
- Penang State Mosque seen from Penang Hill in 2023

- Location of the mosque in George Town, Penang

Religion
- Affiliation: Sunni Islam
- Ecclesiastical or organizational status: Mosque
- Ownership: State Government of Penang
- Status: Active

Location
- Location: George Town, Penang
- Country: Malaysia
- Interactive map of Penang State Mosque
- Coordinates: 5°24′24″N 100°18′05″E

Architecture
- Architect: Efren Brindez Paz
- Type: Mosque architecture
- Style: Modernist
- Groundbreaking: 1977
- Completed: 1980

Specifications
- Minaret: One
- Materials: Concrete

The Penang State Mosque (Malay: Masjid Negeri Pulau Pinang) is a Sunni state mosque located at Jalan Masjid Negeri (Green Lane) in George Town, Penang, Malaysia.

== History ==
Construction of the mosque began on 1977 with the foundation stone was officially laid by Yang di-Pertua Negeri (Governor) of Penang, Tun Sardon Jubir on 16 July 1977. The mosque was completed in 1980 and was officially opened on 29 August 1980 by the seventh Yang di-Pertuan Agong, Sultan Ahmad Shah of Pahang.

== Architecture ==
The mosque was inspired by Brazilian Oscar Niemeyer's design of Cathedral of Brasília in Brasília. Its architecture is an amalgamation of western modernist. The mosque was designed by the Filipino architect, Efren Brindez Paz.

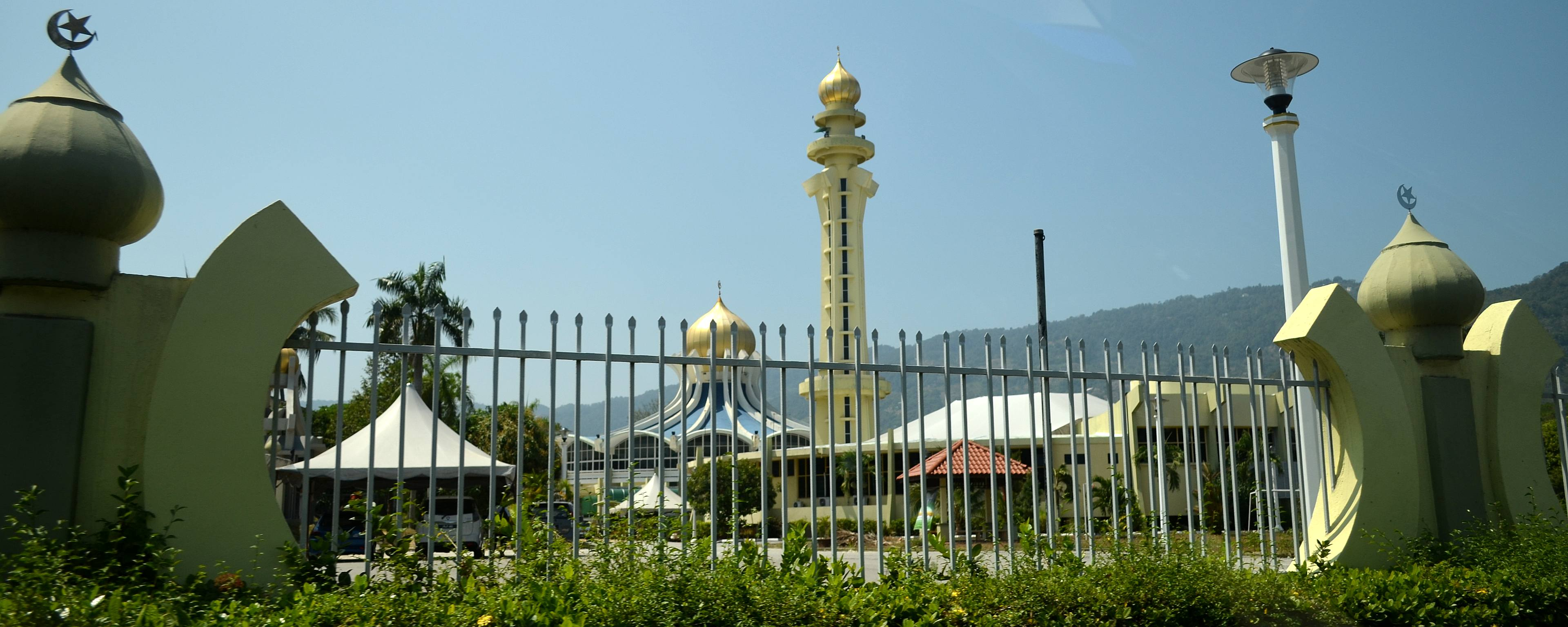
Penang State Mosque viewed from Jalan Masjid Negeri (Green Lane)

== See also ==
- Islam in Malaysia
- List of mosques in Malaysia
