= Muhammadiah Mosque =

Mosque in Kinta, Perak, Malaysia

- Masjid Muhammadiah (Malay); مسجد محمدية (Malay); 穆哈馬迪亞清真寺 (Chinese)
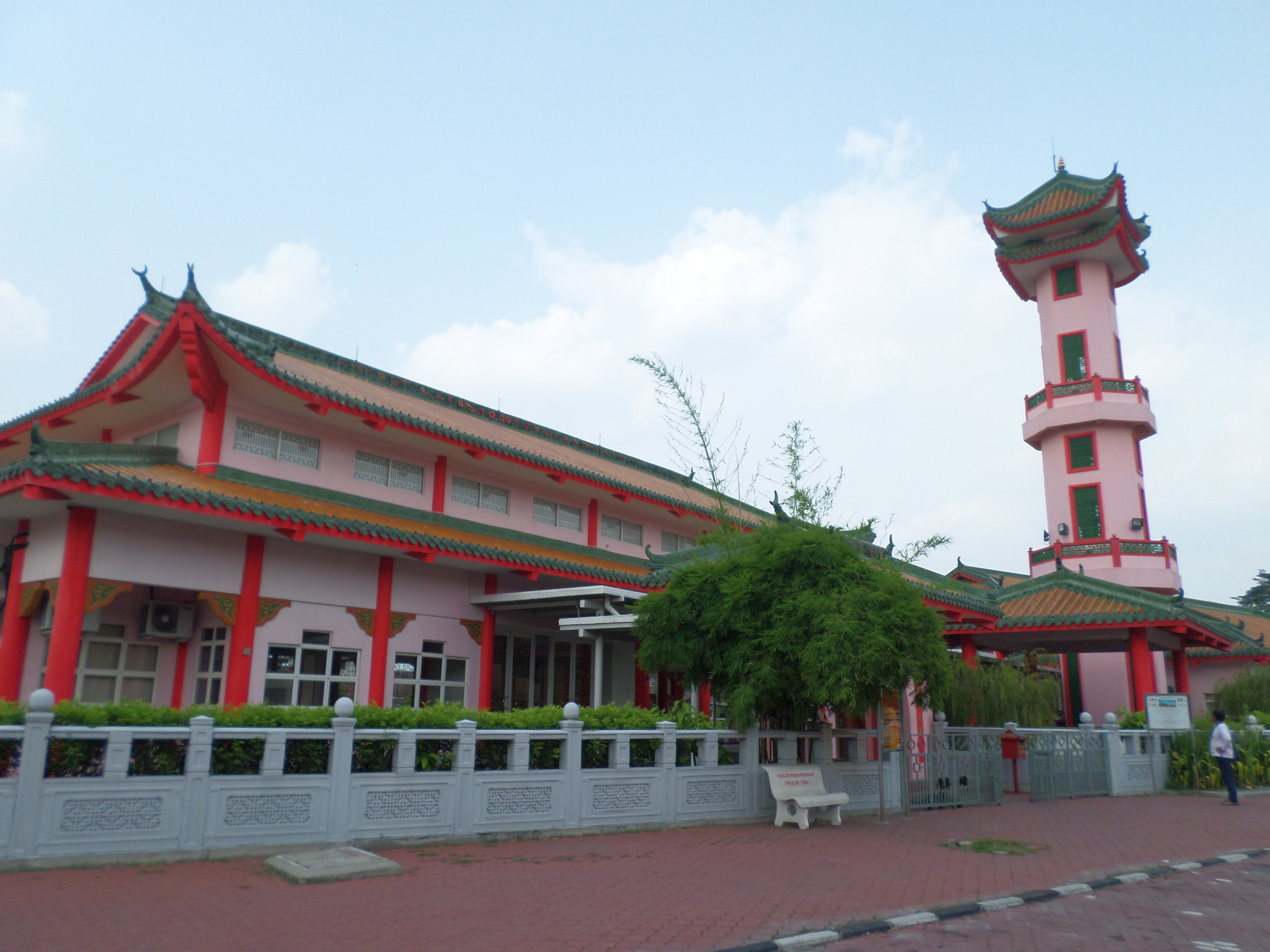

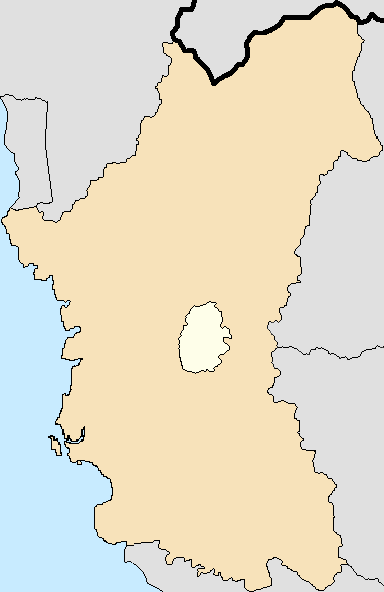
- Location within Ipoh

Religion
- Affiliation: Islam
- Branch/tradition: Sunni
- Ecclesiastical or organizational status: mosque
- Status: Active

Location
- Location: Ipoh, Perak, Malaysia
- Interactive map of Muhammadiah Mosque
- Coordinates: 4°38′58″N 101°06′27″E

Architecture
- Architect: Noor Dahlan Architect
- Type: mosque
- Style: Chinese Oriental
- Established: 18 July 2014
- Groundbreaking: 2013
- Construction cost: RM4,000,000

Specifications
- Capacity: 1,500 worshippers
- Minaret: 1
- Site area: 0.4 hectares (0.99 acres)

The Muhammadiah Mosque (Malay: Masjid Muhammadiah; Chinese: 穆哈馬迪亞清真寺, romanized: Mùhāmǎdíyà qīngzhēnsì) is a mosque in Ipoh, Kinta District, Perak, Malaysia.

== History ==
The land where the mosque stands used to be the Madrasah Muhammadiah constructed in 1973. In 1978, a small surau was constructed at the area and upgraded to a mosque on 21 December 2007. The planning to establish a new mosque with Chinese architecture style started in 2008. The design of the mosque was finalized and approved in 2009. Construction started on 24 November 2011 and completed in 2013. The building started to be used for daily prayer in August 2013. It was officially opened by Perak Sultan Nazrin Shah on 18 July 2014. It is the second Chinese-style mosque in the country. It was constructed with a cost of MYR4 million with a joint effort from the Ipoh branch of Malaysian Chinese Muslim Association and the committee of the original mosque. In August 2019, the upgrading work for the mosque began with the construction of a hall for a development and education centre.

== Architecture ==
The mosque was constructed with Chinese architecture style on 0.4 hectares (0.99 acres) of land, which also consists of a park. It has half moon-shaped entrance, green roofs, red pillars and a pagoda-shaped minaret. The roofs were imported from Longyan, China. The ceiling of the main prayer hall is decorated with lotus flower motifs. It can accommodate up to 2,000 worshippers. The architecture symbolizes harmony between Islam and Chinese culture in Malaysia.

== See also ==
- List of mosques in Malaysia in a Chinese style
- Islam in Malaysia
