= Masjid Shah =

Masjid Shah can refer to:

- Shah Mosque in Isfahan, Iran
- Sultan Idris Shah State Mosque in Perak, Malaysia
