= Federal Territory Mosque =

Mosque in Kuala Lumpur, Malaysia

- Masjid Wilayah Persekutuan مسجد ولايه ڤرسكوتوان
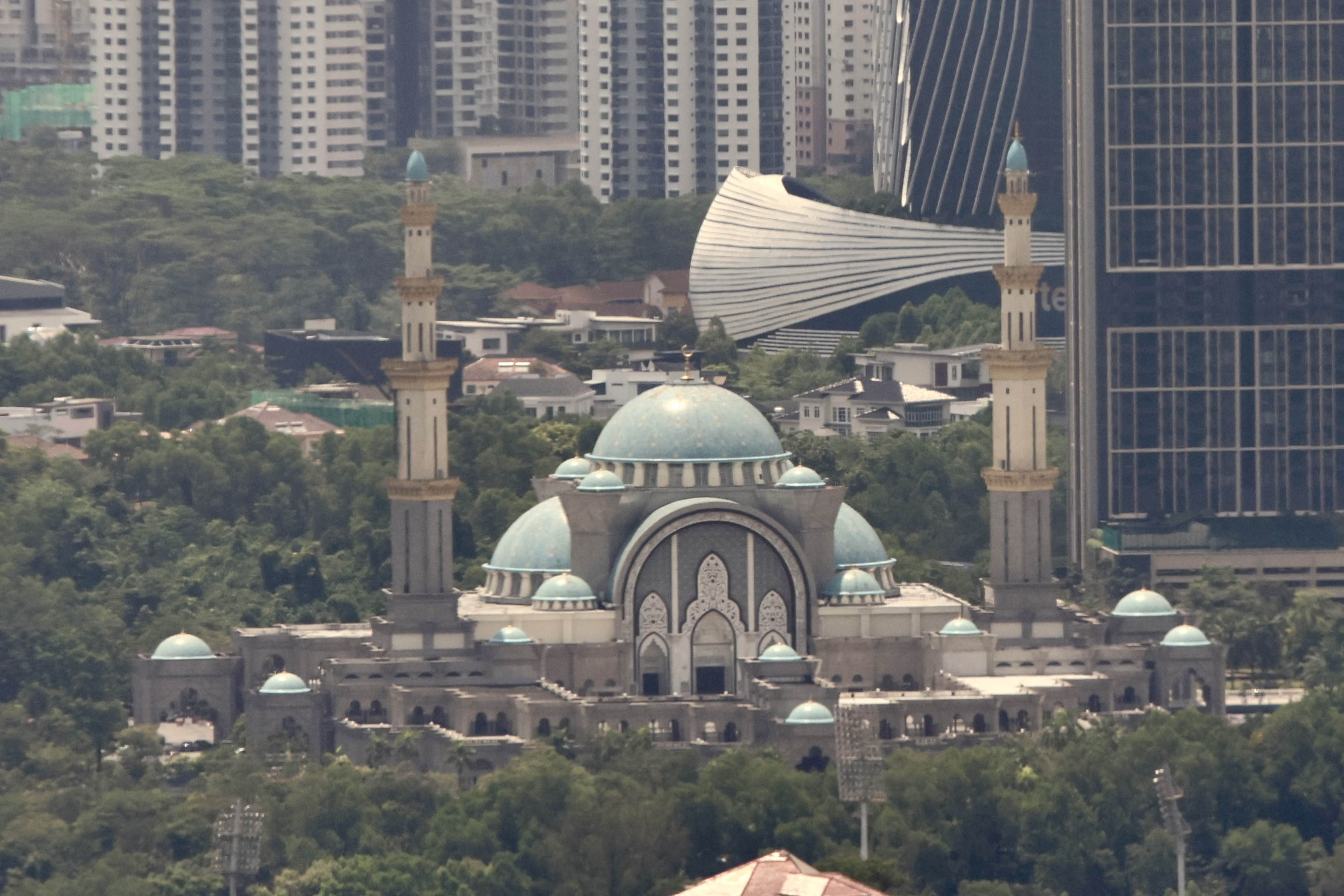

- Location of the mosque in Kuala Lumpur

Religion
- Affiliation: Sunni Islam
- Ecclesiastical or organisational status: Mosque
- Status: Active

Location
- Location: Jalan Duta, Segambut, Kuala Lumpur
- Country: Malaysia
- Coordinates: 3°10′19″N 101°40′16″E

Architecture
- Type: Mosque architecture
- Style: Ottoman; Malay
- Groundbreaking: 1998
- Completed: 2000

Specifications
- Capacity: 17,000 worshippers
- Dome: 22
- Minaret: Two
- Site area: 5 ha (12 acres)
- Materials: Glass fibre

The Federal Territory Mosque (Malay: Masjid Wilayah Persekutuan) is a Sunni mosque, located in Kuala Lumpur, Malaysia. The mosque is situated near MATRADE complex and the Federal Government Complex off Jalan Tuanku Abdul Halim, in the Segambut district.

== History ==
The Kuala Lumpur Mosque was constructed between 1998 and 2000. It is situated on a 5-hectare (12-acre) site near the Government Office Complex along Jalan Duta. The Wilayah Persekutuan (Federal Territory) Mosque was opened to the public on 25 October 2000 and was officiated by the 12th Yang di-Pertuan Agong, Tuanku Syed Sirajuddin ibni Almarhum Syed Putra Jamalulail on 18 February 2005. It is the 44th mosque built by the Government within the city limits. The mosque can accommodate 17,000 worshippers at any one time.

== Architecture ==
The mosque's design is a blend of Ottoman and Malay architectural styles, heavily influenced by the Blue Mosque in Istanbul, Turkey. It has 22 domes made from a composite material of glass fibre fabric mixed with epoxy resin to make it durable and light.

== Gallery ==
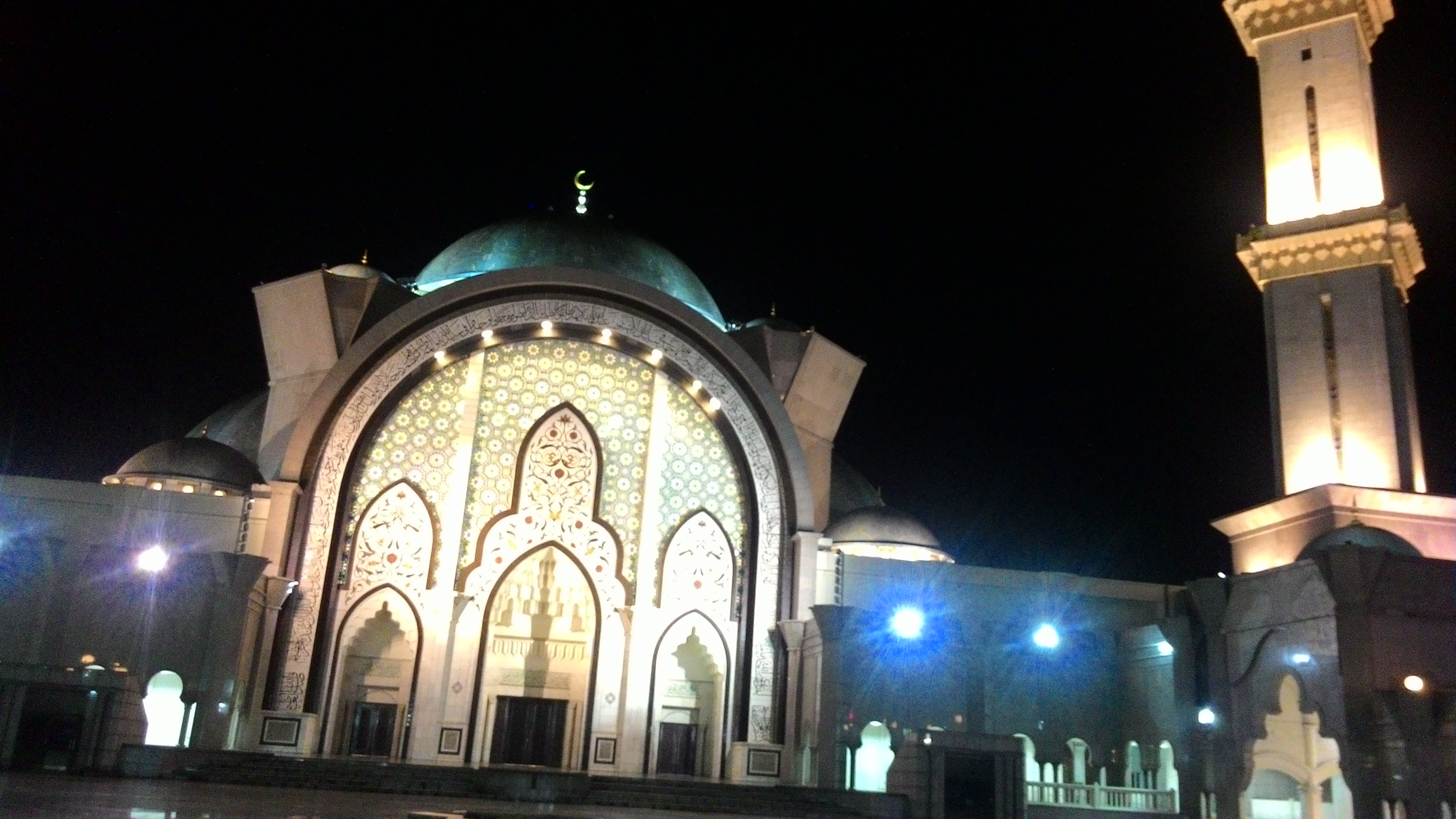
Mosque in dawn

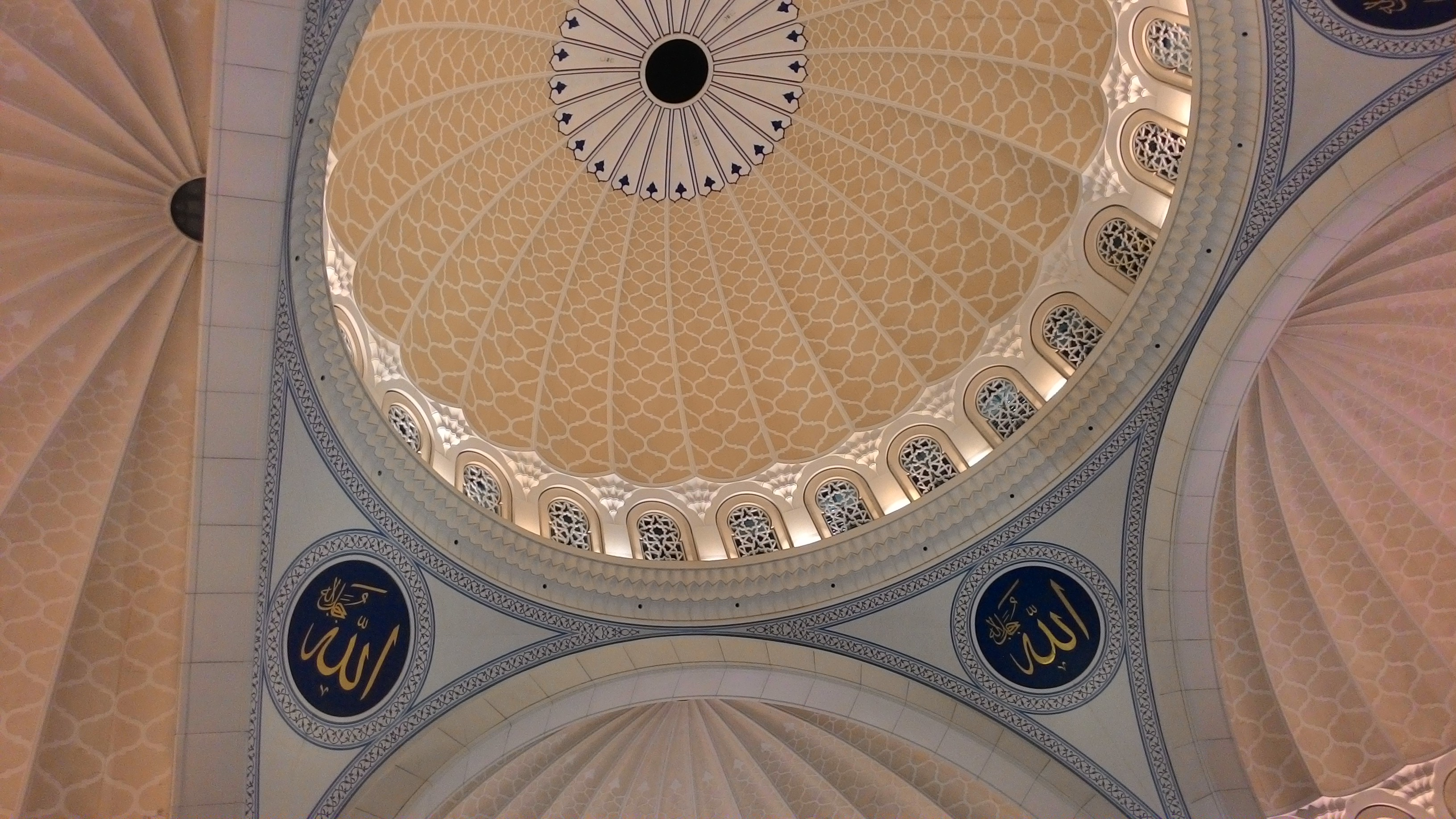
Dome of the mosque

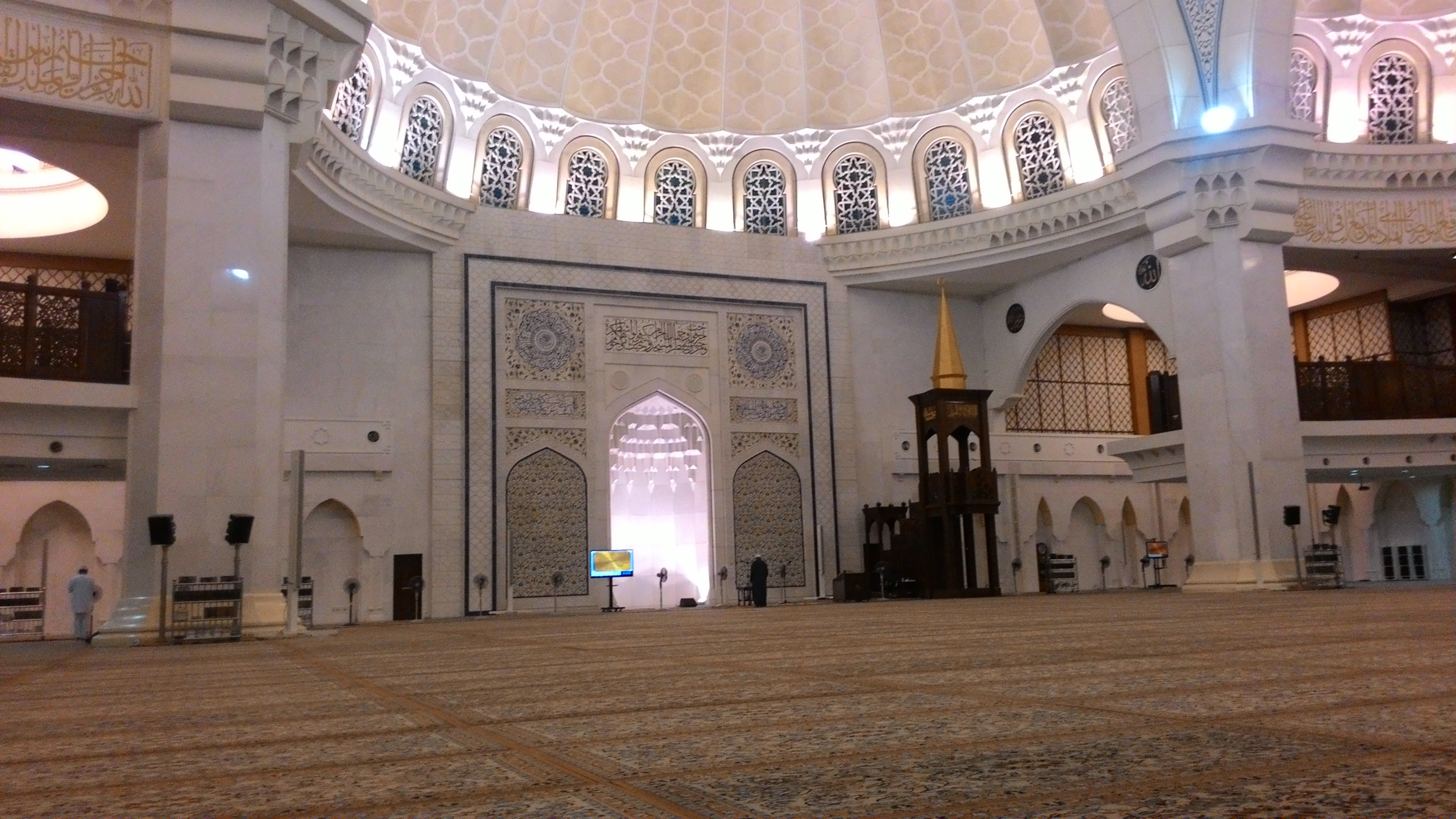
Interior of mosque

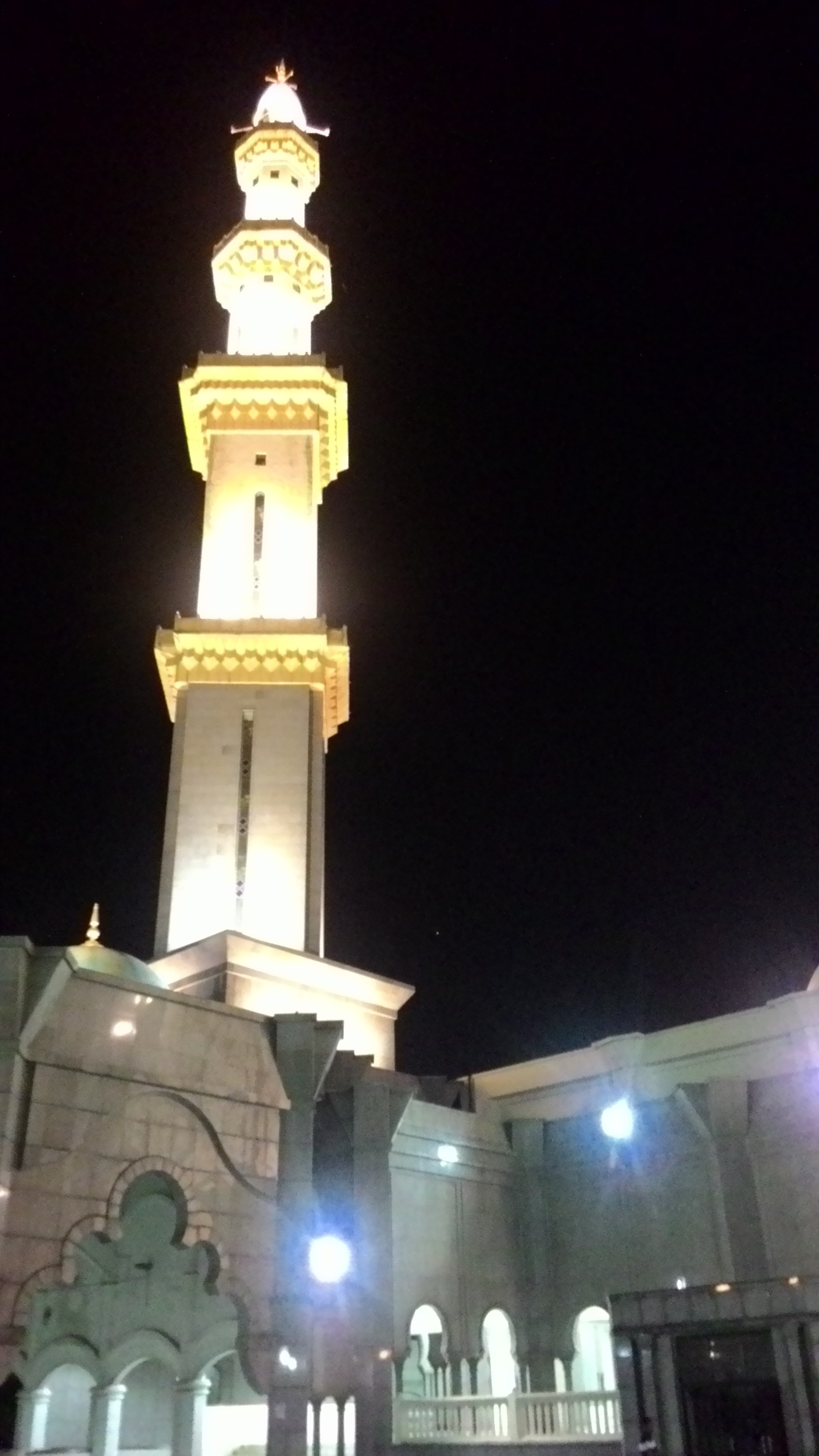
Minaret of mosque

== See also ==
- Islam in Malaysia
- List of mosques in Malaysia
