= Seremban Jamek Mosque =

Mosque in Seremban, Negeri Sembilan, Malaysia

- Masjid Jamek Seremban مسجد جامڠ سرمبن
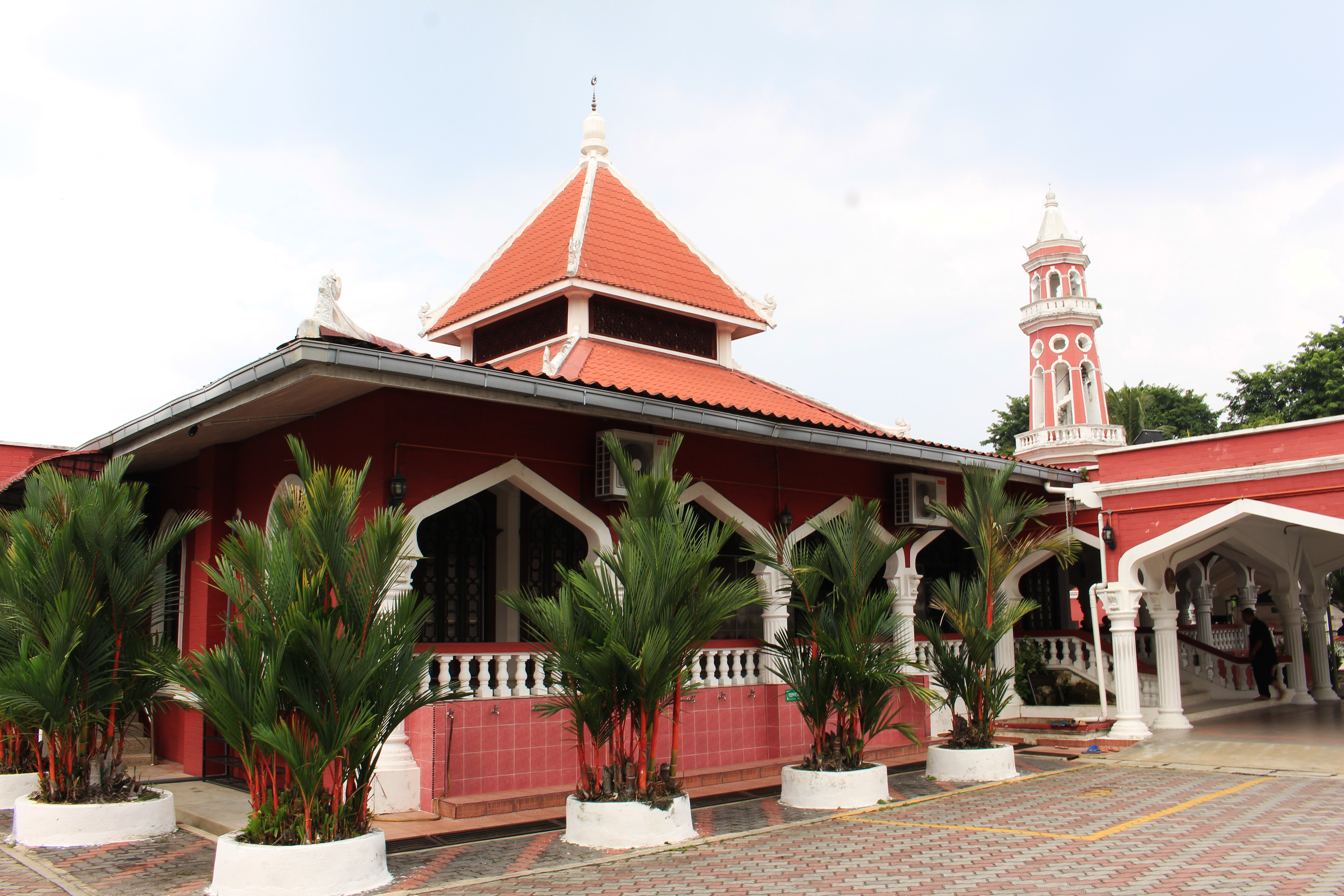

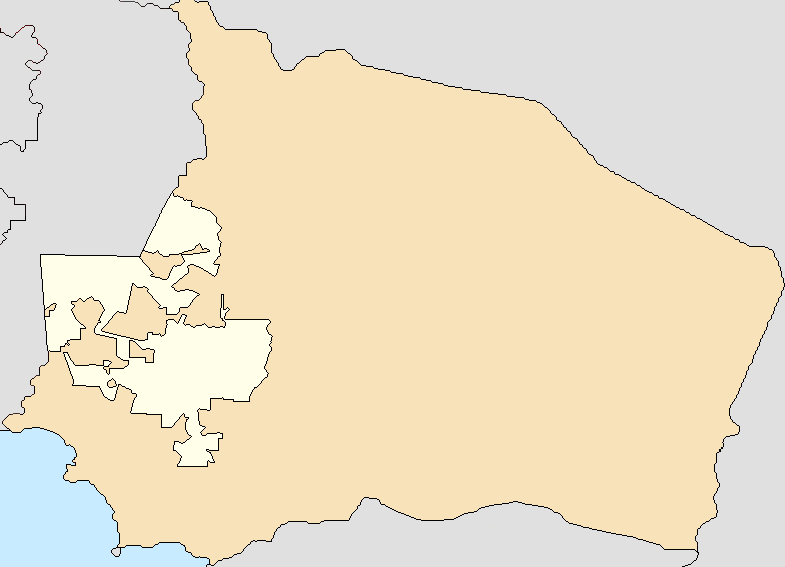
- Location within Seremban

Religion
- Affiliation: Islam

Location
- Location: Seremban, Negeri Sembilan, Malaysia
- Interactive map of Seremban Jamek Mosque
- Coordinates: 2°43′50.9″N 101°56′17.9″E

Architecture
- Type: mosque

The Seremban Jamek Mosque (Malay: Masjid Jamek Seremban) is an old mosque in Seremban, Negeri Sembilan, Malaysia. It is located on the corners of Jalan Yam Tuan and Jalan Dato' Bandar Tunggal. Its architectural style is old Malaccan mosque style.

== See also ==
- Islam in Malaysia
