= Sultan Idris Shah II Mosque =

Mosque in Kinta, Perak, Malaysia

- Masjid Sultan Idris Shah II مسجد سلطان إدريس شاه كدوا
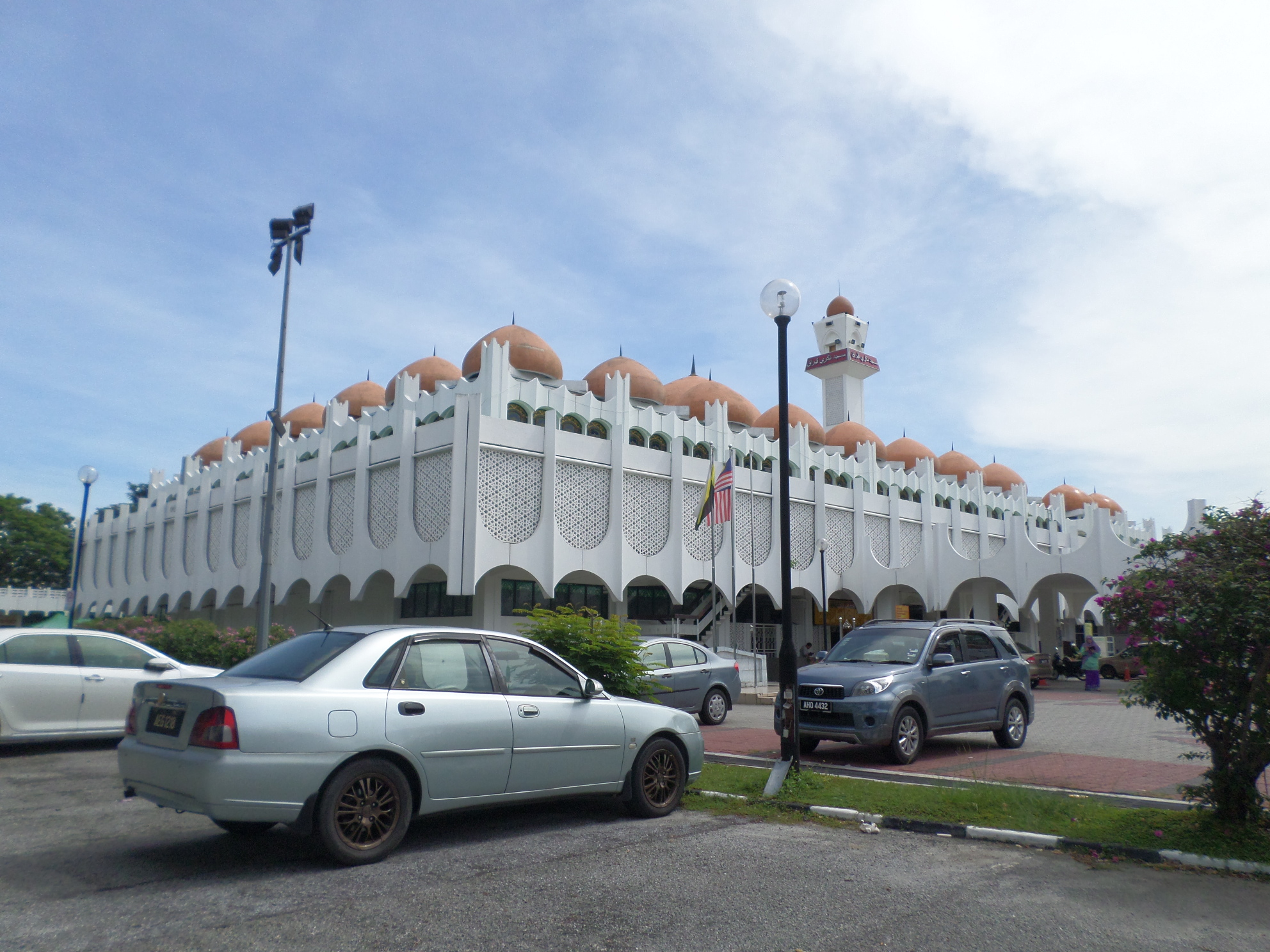

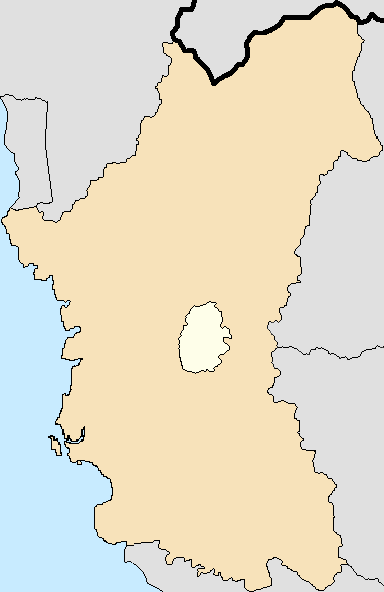
- Location within Ipoh

Religion
- Affiliation: Islam
- Branch/tradition: Sunni

Location
- Location: Ipoh, Perak, Malaysia
- Interactive map of Sultan Idris Shah II Mosque
- Coordinates: 4°35′46.2″N 101°04′33.0″E

Architecture
- Type: mosque
- Groundbreaking: May 1966
- Completed: 1968

The Sultan Idris Shah II Mosque (Malay: Masjid Sultan Idris Shah II) is the state mosque of Perak, Malaysia. It is situated in Ipoh, Perak's capital city, near the Birch Memorial Clock Tower.

== History ==
The construction of the mosque began in May 1966 and was completed in August 1968. The mosque was officially opened in September 1978 by Sultan Idris Shah II of Perak in conjunction with his 54th birthday celebration.

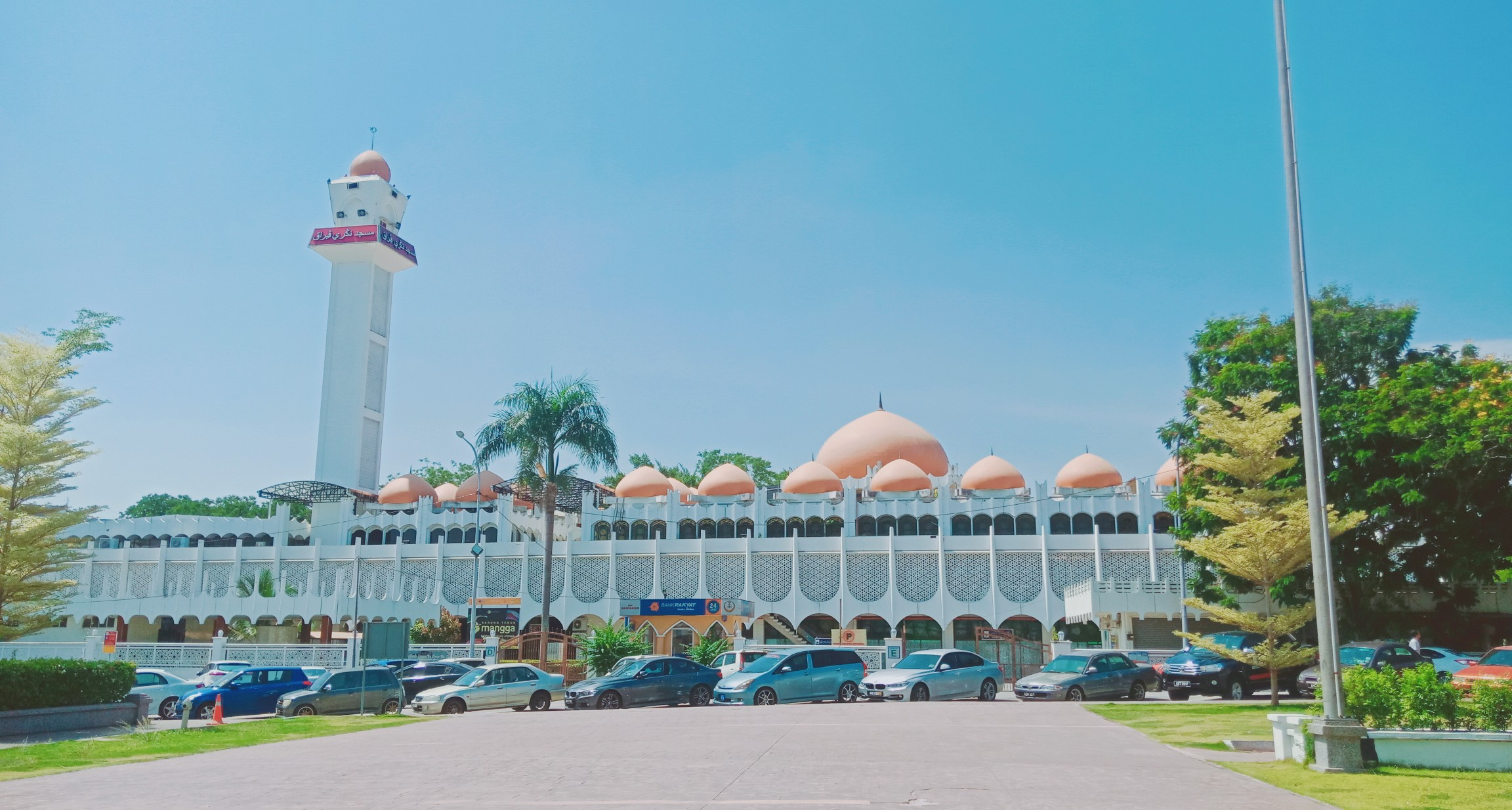

== Transportation ==
The mosque is accessible within walking distance east of Ipoh Station of KTM.

== See also ==
- Islam in Malaysia
- Mosques in Malaysia
