= Al-Rahman Mosque, Kuala Lumpur =

Mosque in Kuala Lumpur, Malaysia

Coordinates: 3°07′06.9″N 101°39′45.8″E

Al-Rahman Mosque
- Masjid Al-Rahman
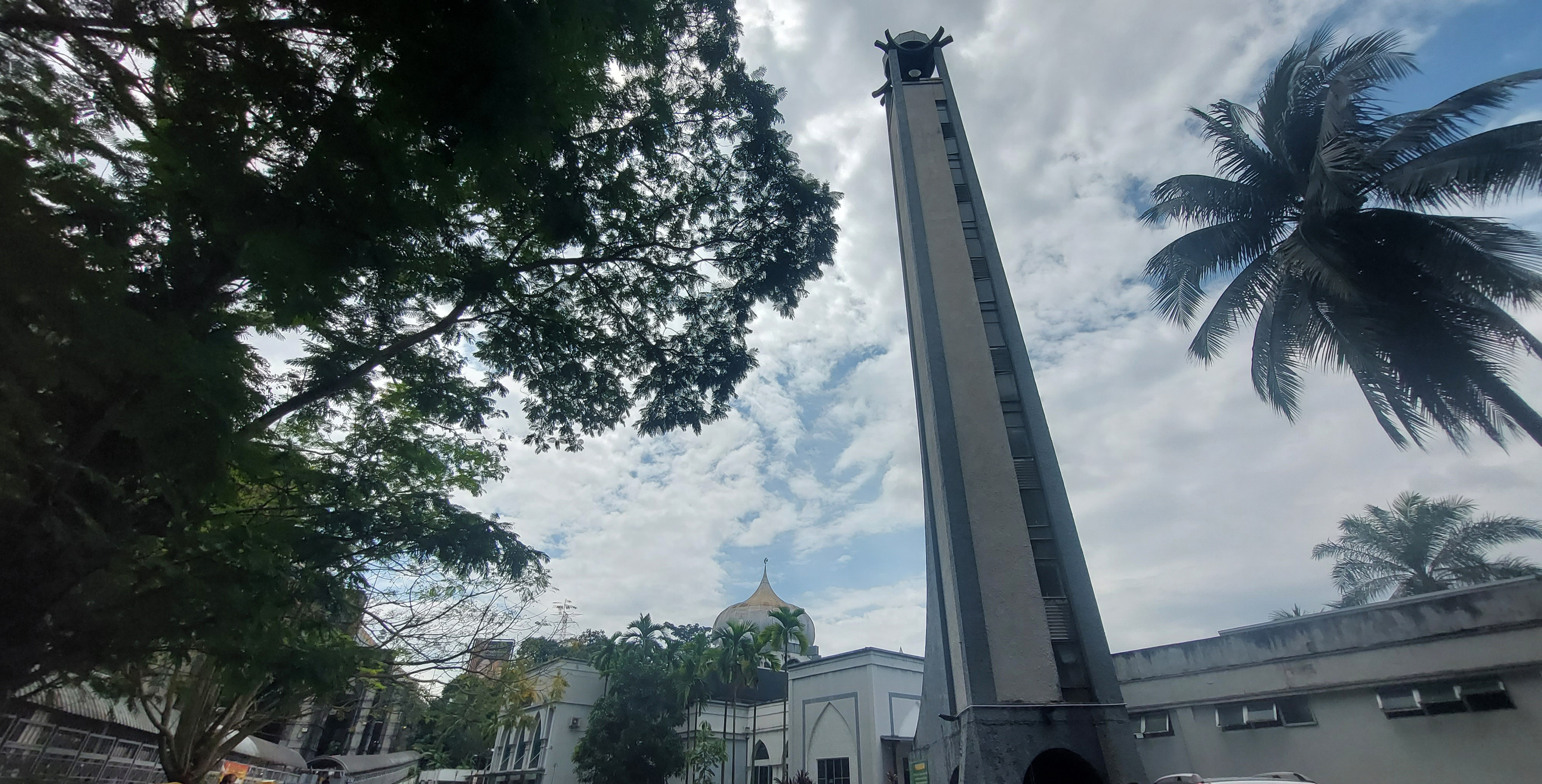

Religion
- Affiliation: Islam

Location
- Location: University of Malaya, Kuala Lumpur, Malaysia
- Interactive map of Al-Rahman Mosque

Architecture
- Type: Mosque
- Style: Modernist
- Minaret: 1

The Al-Rahman Mosque (Malay: Masjid Al-Rahman) is a mosque in Kuala Lumpur, Malaysia. The mosque is located at University of Malaya in Jalan Pantai Baharu and was named after the first Malaysian Prime Minister, Tunku Abdul Rahman Putra Al-Haj. Today, the mosque is joint managed by University of Malaya and the Department of Federal Territory Islamic Affairs (JAWI).

== History ==
The foundation stone of the mosque was laid down by the first Malaysian Prime Minister, Almarhum Tunku Abdul Rahman Putra Al-Haj on 6 November 1962. Construction of this mosque took about a year to complete with a total expenditure of about RM 400,000 (a the large number at that point).

On 23 August 1963, the mosque was officially opened by the third Yang di-Pertuan Agong, Almarhum Tuanku Syed Putra Jamalullail of Perlis.

In 2010, the mosque started hosting a methadone programme combined with praying to treat drug addicts. The methadone is dispensed through pharmacists by the Ministry of Health, while doctors from the University of Malaya supervise the patients. The spiritual side of the treatment is thought to help prevent relapse.

== See also ==
- Islam in Malaysia
