= Kampung Hulu Mosque =

Mosque in Malacca City, Malacca, Malaysia

Kampong Hulu Mosque
- Masjid Kampung Hulu
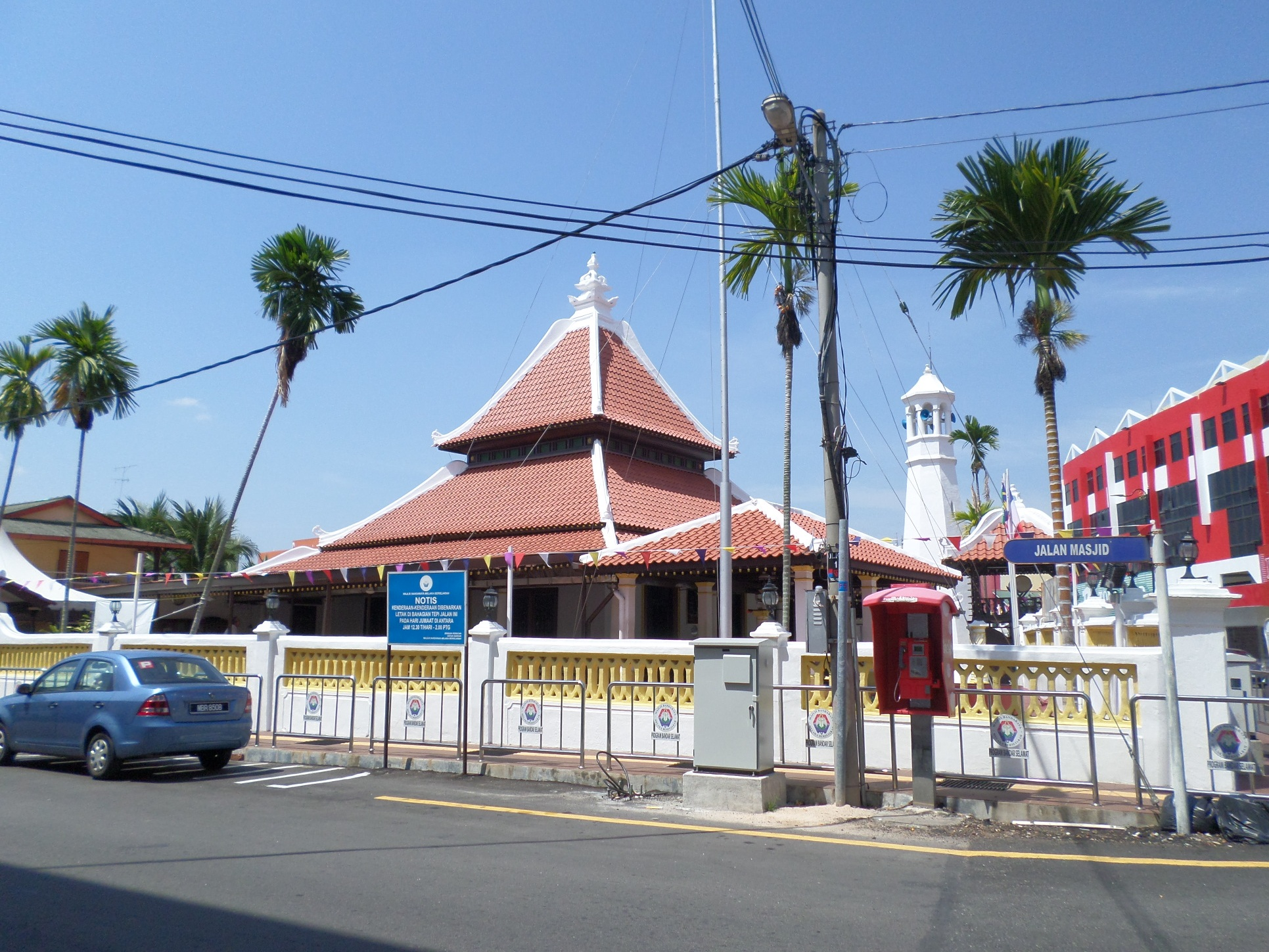

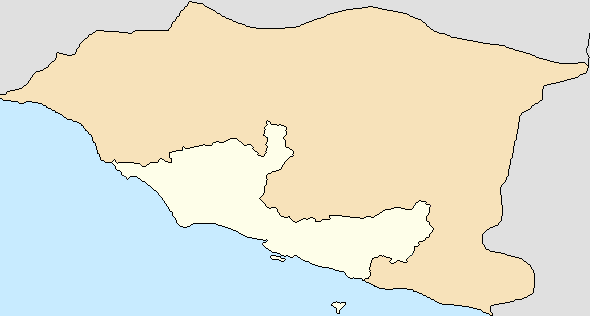
- Location within Malacca City

Religion
- Affiliation: Islam
- Branch/tradition: Sunni

Location
- Location: Malacca City, Malacca, Malaysia
- Interactive map of Kampong Hulu Mosque
- Coordinates: 2°11′57.3″N 102°14′51.4″E

Architecture
- Type: mosque
- Completed: 1728

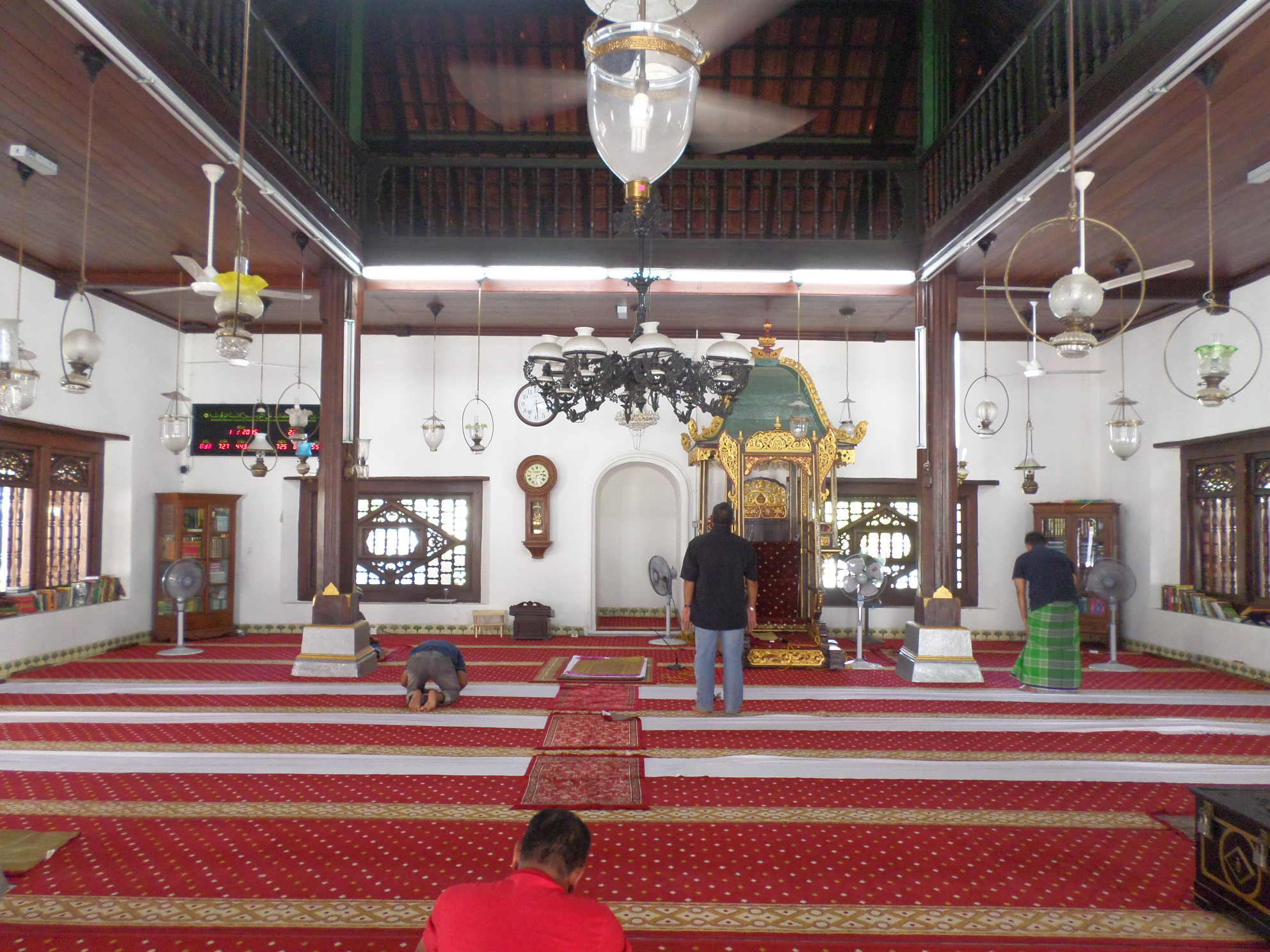
Kampung Hulu Mosque prayer hall

Kampung Hulu Mosque (Malay: Masjid Kampung Hulu) is a mosque situated at Kampong Hulu Village in Malacca City, Malacca, Malaysia. It is the oldest mosque in Malacca and among the oldest in the country, having originally built around the year 1720–1728 and underwent renovation in 1892. The architectural design of the mosque is a cross between Javanese Architecture, Local Malay, Sumateran, and Sini. The minaret, ablution pool and entrance arch were built at the same time with the main building. The minaret resembles a pagoda with the style of "Balai Nobat Melayu". An ancient cemetery lies next to the mosque in where some notable preachers and missionaries are buried.

== See also ==
- Islam in Malaysia
