= Sultan Ismail Petra Mosque =

Mosque in Pasir Mas, Kelantan, Malaysia

- Masjid Sultan Ismail Petra
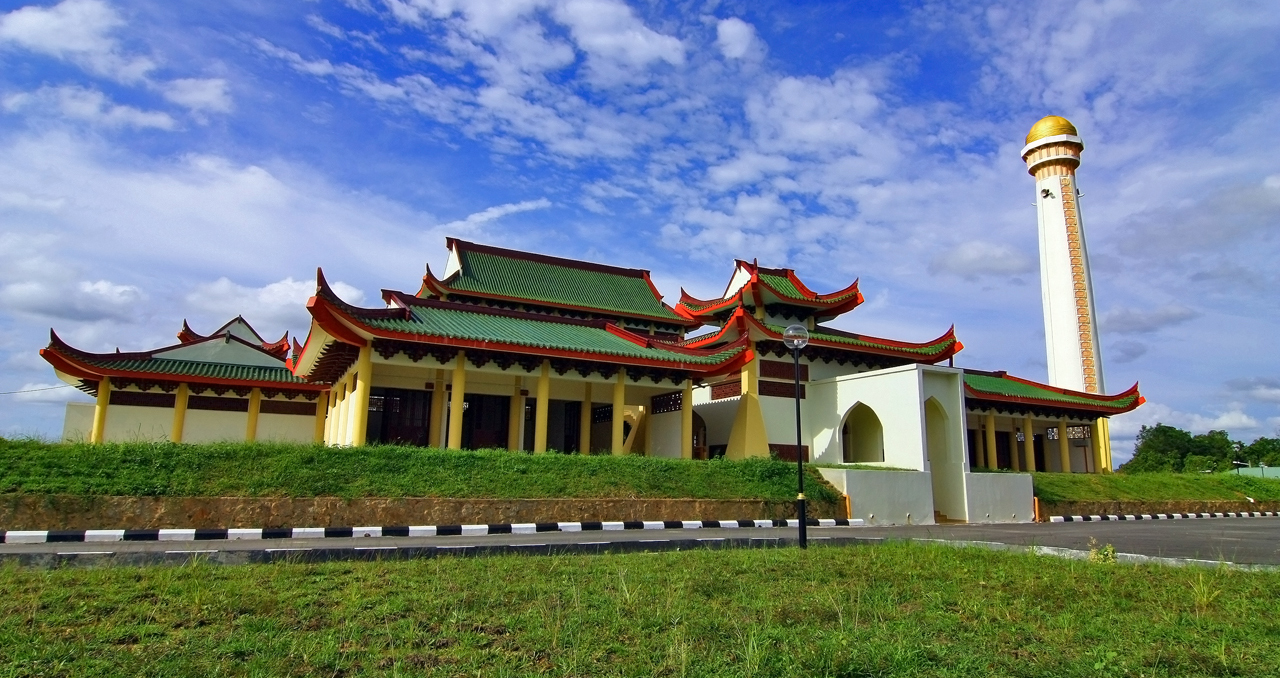

- Location within Kelantan

Religion
- Affiliation: Islam
- Branch/tradition: Sunni

Location
- Location: Rantau Panjang, Kelantan, Malaysia
- Coordinates: 6°00′55.2″N 101°58′57.8″E

Architecture
- Type: Mosque
- Style: Chinese
- Established: August 2009

Sultan Ismail Petra Mosque is a Chinese-style mosque in Rantau Panjang, Kelantan, Malaysia. The mosque resembles the 1,000-year-old Niujie Mosque in Beijing, China.

Construction started on September 12, 2005, and the mosque was inaugurated in August 2009 with a total estimated building cost of RM8.8 million. The mosque boasts a total area of 3.7 acres and can accommodate 1,000 worshipers at one time.

== Location ==
The mosque is located at the edge of the Pasir Mas-Rantau Panjang Highway, about 2 km from Rantau Panjang.

== See also ==
- Islam in Malaysia
