= Kampung Laut Mosque =

Mosque in Kota Bharu, Kelantan, Malaysia

- Malay: Masjid Kampung Laut; Jawi: مسجد کامڤوڠ لاءوت
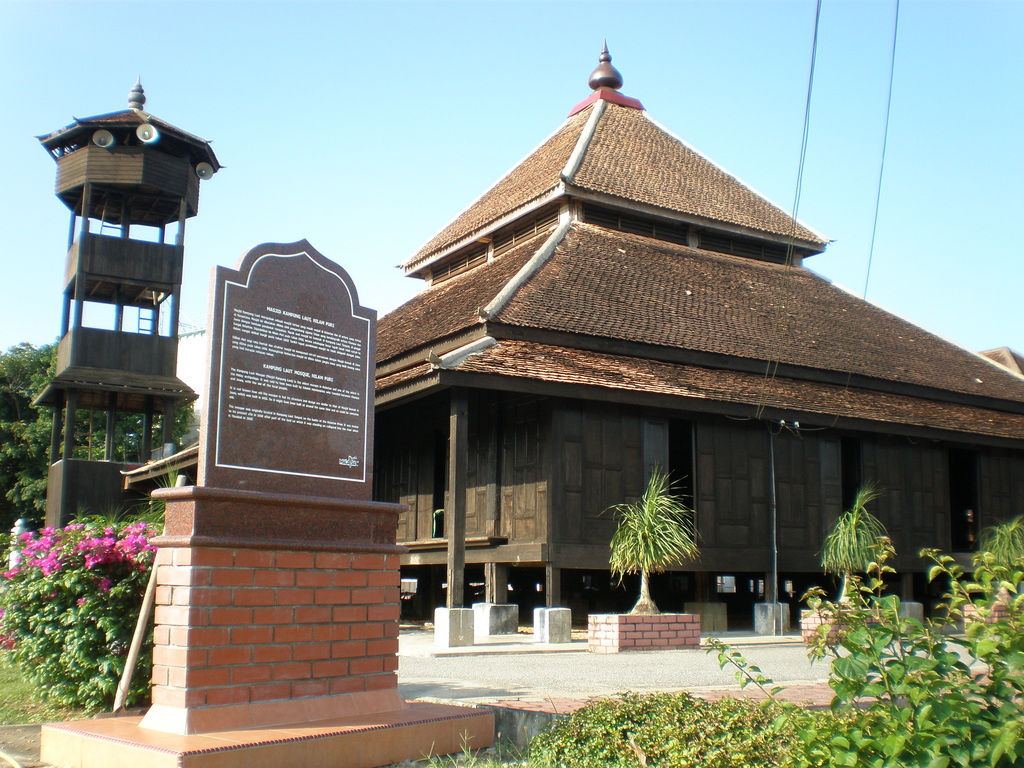

- Location within Kelantan

Religion
- Affiliation: Islam
- Branch/tradition: Sunni

Location
- Location: Kelantan, Malaysia
- Interactive map of Kampung Laut Mosque
- Coordinates: 6°09′15.8″N 102°13′51.5″E

Architecture
- Type: mosque
- Style: Islamic, Malay
- Minaret: 1

Kampung Laut Mosque (Malay: Masjid Kampung Laut) is one of the oldest mosques in Malaysia. There is no confirmatory evidence of when the building of the mosque took place. It is estimated to have been built sometime in the 15th century or 18th century. It is located in Kampung Laut, Tumpat District, Kelantan.

== History ==
Masjid Kampung Laut is estimated to have been built in the 15th century by a group of Champa government transporters from the Kingdom of Champa. Its style is largely typical of local traditional architecture and is climate-appropriate, similar to local houses in the area. The style is also remnant of a once culturally southern Indian Hindu architecture. The original mosque had a basic architectural style and structure: with four pillars for the foundation and palm fronds for the roof.

During the reign of the Kelantan Sultanate between 1859 and 1900, the mosque became an important meeting point for the sultans and religious leaders. The mosque was also used as a trading post. During this period, the mosque was expanded and upgraded with 20 pillars, a three-tiered roof, a tower (for the muezzin to call for prayers), an attic, and a water tank while the flooring was made of good-quality timber. The mosque was handed over to the Kelantan Government under Menteri Besar Datuk Asri Muda's administration in May 1970.

Kampung Laut is considered a traditional area for gathering, as the tradition in the region dates back thousands of years.

== Floods ==
The mosque has survived two big floods that occurred in Kelantan: the first in 1926, with the flood known as Bah Air Merah, and the other in 1966. The second flood severely damaged the mosque when parts of the mosque close to the river were swept away by flood waters. However, the mosque was repaired subsequently.

== See also ==
- Islam in Malaysia
- Islam in Southeast Asia
