= Islam in Malaysia =

Percentage population of Islam in Malaysia according to 2020 census.

Islam is the majority religion in Malaysia, being followed by more than 65% of the country's population, accounting for 22.4 million Muslim adherents. The Shafi'i school of Sunni jurisprudence is predominant in the country. A minority of Hanafi school followers is also found within the country. Hanafi presence in Malaysia is primarily amongst Hui Muslims.

Islam was introduced to Malaysia by traders arriving from Persia, Arabia, China and the Indian subcontinent. It became firmly established in the 15th century. Various Islamic holidays such as Eid al-Fitr, Eid al-Adha and Mawlid have been declared national holidays.

The Constitution of Malaysia grants Islam the status of "religion of the Federation" to represent its importance to Malaysian society, but this is often interpreted as being primarily for ceremonial purposes, while defining Malaysia constitutionally as a de jure secular state. Despite this, freedom of religion is severely limited and religious discrimination is institutionalised; Malaysian Malays are legally forbidden from practicing any religion other than Sunni Islam, and other faiths are only tolerated for non-Malays. The state enforces a strict religious monopoly that excludes Shia Islam, which is deemed as a "deviant sect" and officially banned and unrecognised. Consequently, authorities systematically target the Shia community through raids and forced closures of gatherings, as there are no public, recognised Shia mosques allowed in the country.

== History ==
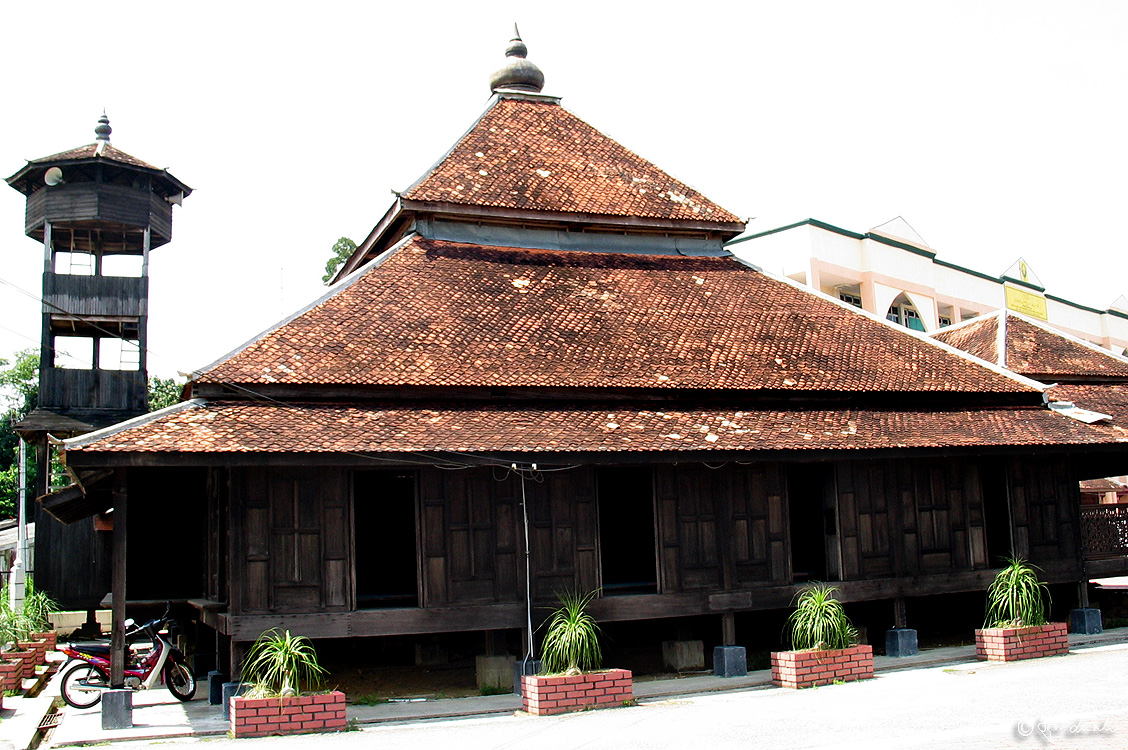
Kampung Laut Mosque in Tumpat is one of the oldest mosques in Malaysia, dating to early 18th century

Scholarly discussions on the first and early propagation of Islam in the Malay Peninsula have been inconclusive due to the paucity of documentary evidence. However, the main theory of the Islamization of the area comes either from the Indian subcontinent (either Gujarat or South India) or the Arab-Persian lands and this most likely started in the 12th century.

However, the discovery of a Muslim tombstone in Pahang, which has been dated to 419 AH (1028 CE), suggests Islam's presence in the Malay world much earlier, however the majority of those inscriptions were about foreign Muslims. In the 19th century, the Terengganu Inscription Stone was found in Kuala Berang, Terengganu, highlighting the evidence of Islam in the Malay state, the stone is dated to either the year 1303 or 1383. Sultan Megat Iskandar Shah, previously known as Parameswara prior to his conversion, is the first Sultan of Melaka in the early 15th century. He converted to Islam after marrying a princess from Pasai, of present-day Indonesia.

The religion was adopted peacefully by the people of the coastal trading ports in modern-day Malaysia and Indonesia, absorbing rather than conquering existing beliefs. Islam gradually spread from coastal ports to the hinterland, by the 17th century the majority of people in the Malay Peninsula had converted to Islam.

=== Influences of Zheng He's voyages ===
Zheng He, a 14th and 15th century Chinese explorer, is credited to have settled Chinese Muslim communities in Palembang and along the shores of Java, the Malay Peninsula, and the Philippines. These Muslims allegedly followed the Hanafi school in the Chinese language. This Chinese Muslim community was led by Yan Ying Yu, who urged his followers to assimilate and take local names.

== Background ==
=== Religion of the Federation ===
The initial draft of the Constitution of Malaysia did not specify an official religion. This move was supported by the rulers of the nine Malay states, who felt that it was sufficient that Islam was the official religion of each of their individual states. However, Justice Hakim Abdul Hamid of the Reid Commission which drafted the constitution came out strongly in favour of making Islam the official religion, and as a result the final constitution named Islam as the official religion of Malaysia. All ethnic Malays are Muslim, as defined by Article 160 of the Constitution of Malaysia.

Nine of the Malaysian states, namely Kelantan, Terengganu, Pahang, Kedah, Perak, Perlis, Selangor, Johor, and Negeri Sembilan have constitutional Malay monarchs (most of them styled as Sultans). These Malay rulers still maintain authority over religious affairs in states. The states of Penang, Malacca, Sarawak, and Sabah do not have any sultan, but the king (Yang di-Pertuan Agong) plays the role of head of Islam in each of those states as well as in each of the Federal Territories of Kuala Lumpur, Labuan, and Putrajaya.

Although Islam is the official religion of Malaysia, the Reid Commission who drafted the Malaysian Constitution clarified that:

The observance of this principle shall not impose any disability on non Muslim nationals professing and practising their own religions and shall not imply that the State is not a secular State.

— paragraph 169, Report of the Federation of Malaya Constitutional Commission 1957

This observance was originated from a memorandum submitted by the Alliance Party (consist of UMNO, MCA and MIC who represent the three major races in Malaya) to the Reid Commission on 25 September 1956. The memorandum on its proposal on state religion stated that:

Religion: The religion of Malaysia shall be Islam. The observance of this principle shall not impose any disability on non-Muslim nationals professing and practising their own religions, and shall not imply that the State is not a secular State.

— Tunku Abdul Rahman, Political testament of the Alliance, CO 889/6

After the recommendations by the Reid Commission were examined and revised by a Working Party, the final draft for the constitution was published in a white paper in June 1957, which reiterated that Malaysia is still a secular country despite Islam being recognised as its official religion:

There has been included in the Federal Constitution a declaration that Islam is the religion of the Federation. This will in no way affect the present position of the Federation as a secular State, and every person will have the right to profess and practise his own religion and the right to propagate his religion

— paragraph 57, Constitutional Proposals for the Federation of Malaya, Cmnd. 210

The passage in the Reid Commission report that affirmed Malaysia's secular nature was cited by the Malaysian Supreme Court (now Federal Court) in the 1990 case of Teoh Eng Huat v Kadhi, Pasir Mas & Anor, when it ruled that the religion of a minor shall be decided by his parents or guardian. Similarly, in the 2024 case of Nik Elin v Kelantan, the Federal Court observed that Malaysia still leans more towards secularity, with some limited application of Islamic law:

The general legal system in Malaysia leans more towards secularity without being purely secular. What this means is that the source of our law is not purely from divine or Islamic law and the reason why we are not a purely secular State is because limited allowance has been made in the Federal Constitution for the legislation and application of Islamic law. In this sense, we are a unique nation with a mixed or dual secular and Islamic law legal systems that are meant to operate independently of each other.

— Tengku Maimun Tuan Mat, Nik Elin Zurina Nik Abdul Rashid & Anor v. Kerajaan Negeri Kelantan, [2024] 3 MLRA 1

On the occasion of Malaysia's first prime minister Tunku Abdul Rahman's 80th birthday, he stated in the edition of 9 February 1983 of the newspaper The Star that the "country has a multi-racial population with various beliefs. Malaysia must continue as a secular State with Islam as the official religion".

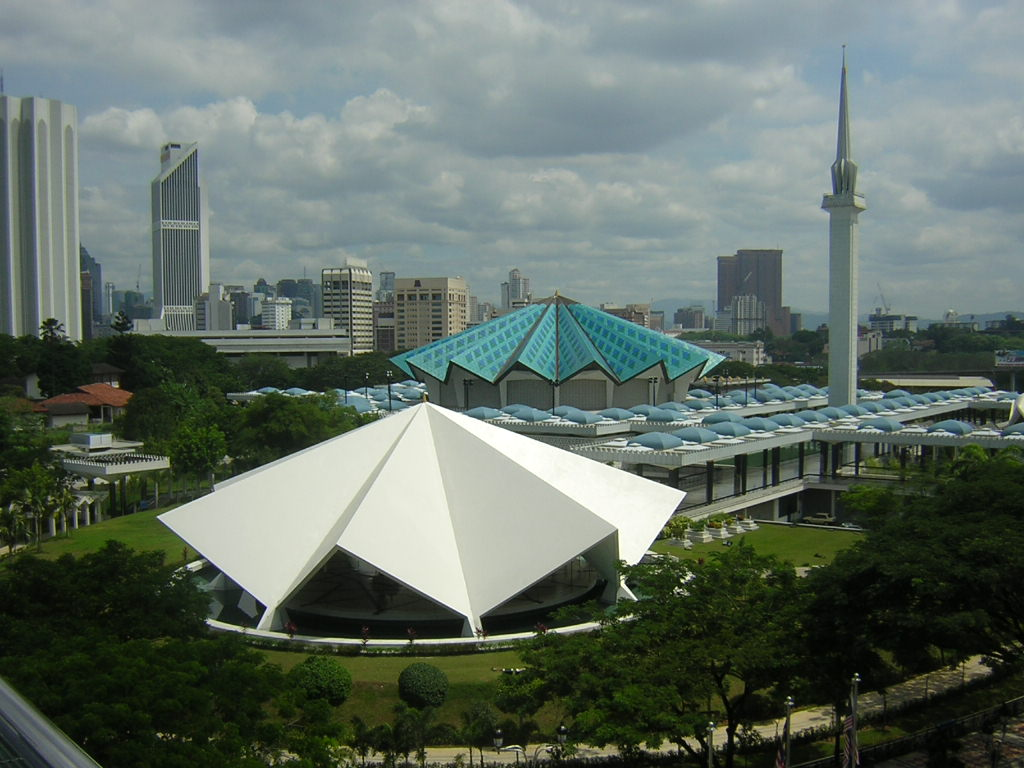
National Mosque of Malaysia in Kuala Lumpur

Four of Malaysia's states, Kelantan, Terengganu, Kedah, and Perlis, are governed by Pan-Malaysian Islamic Party (PAS), which is a conservative Islamic political party, with a proclaimed goal of establishing an Islamic state.

Since 1999, the word "Islam" has been printed at the front of Malaysian identity card (MyKad) for Malaysian Muslims, while the religious status for citizens of other religion was not displayed and was only stored in the identity card's electronic chip. The introduction of this identity card format has caused a political uproar and remains controversial.

There is also an Islamic university in Malaysia called the International Islamic University Malaysia, and a government institution in charge of organising pilgrimages to Mecca called Tabung Haji (Pilgrim Fund Board of Malaysia). In addition, the government also funds the construction of mosques and suraus.

The Department of Islamic Development Malaysia (JAKIM) was established under the Prime Minister's Department. Besides, every state also has its own version of JAKIM. Various Islamic rules and regulations governing the public and family life were codified into law that is compliant to Islam. Government policies have also been permissible in Islam, in other words 'halal'.

The National Fatwa Council was established by Conference of rulers to issue fatwas. It conducts two types of meetings, one was authorised by the Conference of Rulers, another called muzakarah (discourse) is held occasionally without the order of the Conference of Rulers.

=== Contemporary Islam ===
Contemporary Islam follows the Shafi‘ite school of Sunnism. Some Islamic terms, such as the word "Allah" (Arabic for "God"), are forbidden to non-Muslims both orally and in writing. The government ban on the use of the word "Allah" by non-Muslims reversed the 2009 ruling of a court of first instance.

Until the 1970s, many Malay Muslims followed a liberal and moderate Islam, like Indonesian Muslims. At this time, a wave of Islamisation emerged (sparked by various social and ethnic conflicts, linked to the Al-Arqam parties and Islam Se-Malaysia), so that today, Malaysia lives in a more Islamic environment compared to the earlier years. Malays, who represent 50.4% of the total population, are all Muslims. About 70% of Malay Muslim women wear headscarves, but was marginal until the 1980s. The traditional Malay garment, of Islamic origin, is also worn by many Malays. The Malaysian government promotes a moderate version of Sunni Islam called Islam Hadhari.

=== Freedom of worship ===
Article 3 (1) of the Malaysian Constitution provides:

"Islam is the religion of the Federation; but other religions may be practised in peace and harmony in any part of the Federation."

Article 11 of the constitution provides:

"Every person has the right to profess and practice his religion and, subject to Clause (4), to propagate it."

However, matters of apostasy falls within the exclusive jurisdiction of Shariah courts following an amendment to the country's constitution in 1988. The internationally reported failed attempt by Lina Joy in 2007 to convert from Islam to Christianity through the secular Federal Court is one of the most famous representations.

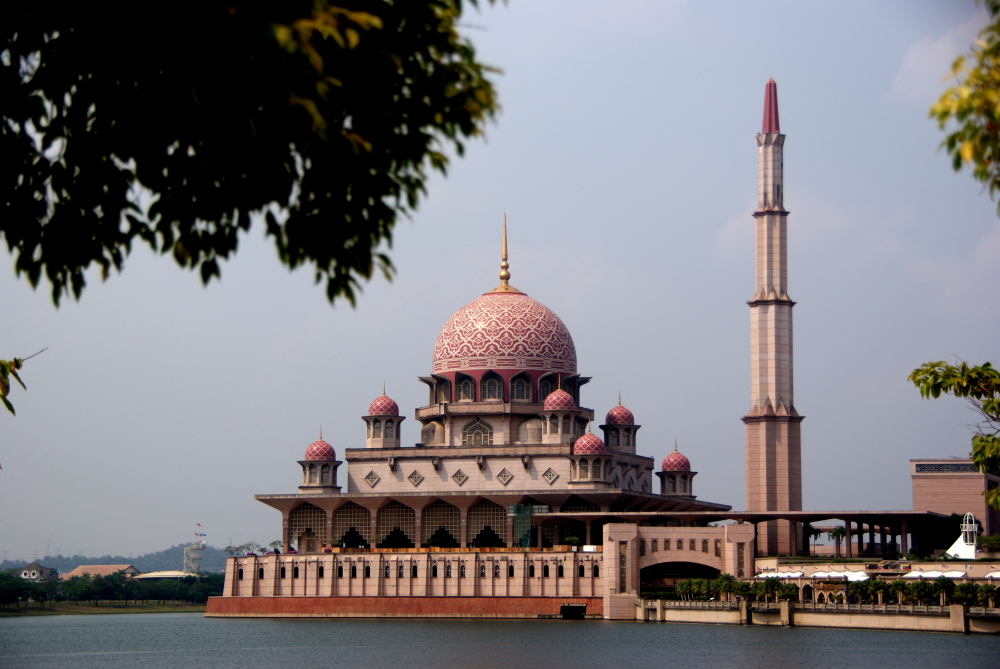
Putra Mosque in Putrajaya

Many Muslims who have changed their religion, whether it is conversion to Buddhism, Christianity, Hinduism, Sikhism, Taoism and other beliefs, are forced for their own safety to lead a double life. In some cases, denunciations of apostasy have already been reported as being reported to the authorities by family members or co-workers.

In February 2014, Edry Faizal, a coordinator in charge of the Democratic Action Party, claimed that it was inconsistent from a Quranic point of view to forbid Muslims from freely changing beliefs, but from his point of view was the best alternative that the power had found to preserve its Malaysian electorate and consequently to remain in power continuously.

In May 2014, Malaysian Prime Minister Najib Razak said during his speech about the future of the country that: "We will never tolerate any demand for the right to apostasy by Muslims, and we refuse that Muslims can have the right to be tried by courts other than sharia courts, and we will not allow Muslims to participate in LGBT activities". But he concluded that this was necessary because: "This is in line with our efforts to make Malaysia a modern, progressive Muslim country in order to achieve the status of a developed nation with a high income for 2020".

In recent years, more and more voices have been asked to try to determine the number of ethnic Malay people supposed to have left Islam. The government has remained silent on the question, believing that it is much too controversial to be debated. However estimates go from 135, according to Ridhuan Tee, a Muslim preacher, to 260,000, according to Harussani Zakaria, the mufti of the state of Perak. The latter highest estimate when put in the context of the 2010 population census would make them between 3 and 4% of the Malaysian majority. Nevertheless, no data estimating the number of Malay who converted to another religion was provided.

Nonetheless, these remarks later triggered a polemic often repeated in the media by Islamist and nationalist circles that recognising the right of the Malayans and the entire Muslim community to be free to choose their own beliefs would risk provoking a "Massive exodus of apostates" within the nation, the same slogan has also been listed on the official website of Islam in Malaysia. On 17 December 2015, Malaysian Police Chief Tan Sri Khalid Abu Bakar during a speech, alluded to this mysterious report: "I can not tell you how much this issue is potentially explosive. "

=== Religious discrimination ===
The state sanctions non-Muslim proselytism towards Muslims, but encourages conversions to Islam. Among the new rights provided to converts, if a man has children, he has the right to convert his children to Islam, without having to consider the approval of his wife.

On 4 December 2015, Malaysian feminist and human rights activist, Shafiqah Othman Hamzah wrote, "What we are living in Malaysia is almost no different from apartheid. While segregation was racial in South Africa, in our country we live in religious segregation." She criticised some politicians and community leaders for leading to "a multi-racial and multi-religious country, but it is with a heavy heart that I say we are not in harmony."

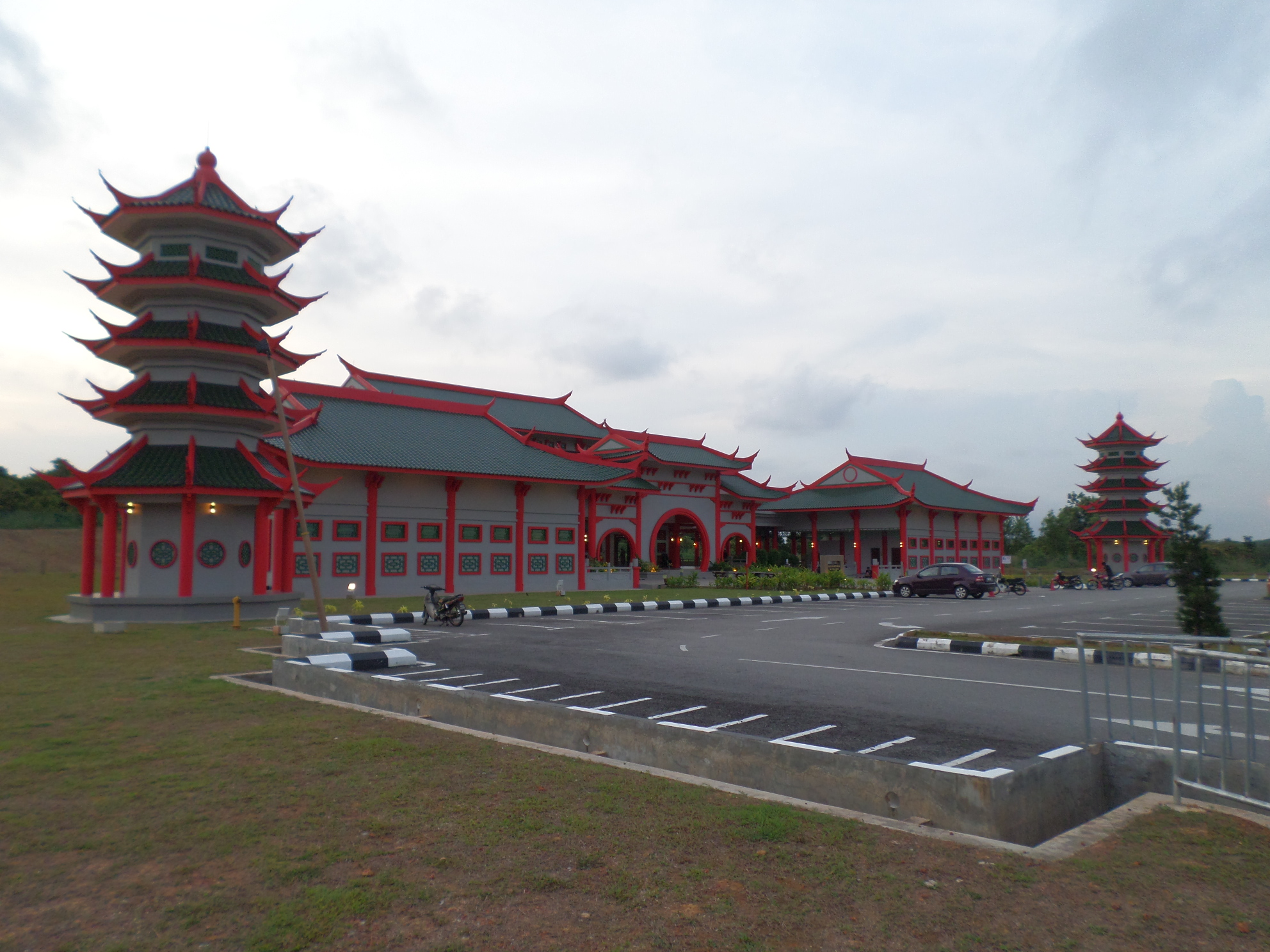
Melaka Chinese Mosque in Malacca

On 9 February 2016, the Putrajaya Federal Court ruled on a scandal termed the "S Deepa Affair" dating back to 4 September 2013, involving forced conversions of children to Islam in a Hindu couple married since 2003. In this case, the father N. Viran converted to Islam in November 2012 under the name of Izwan Abdullah decided to impose his conversion to his two children, his son Mithran and his daughter Sharmila. Shortly after that, the children had their names changed to Nabil for the son and Nurul Nabila for the girl. Becoming the only person judged capable of raising them, he had obtained from the Shari'a court of Seremban their sole custody and through this the dissolution of his marriage.

Their marriage, which had been celebrated according to the Hindu rites and subsequently registered in the civil registers, was thus dissolved by the Shari'a court on the sole ground of the conversion to Islam by the husband, making it immediately obsolete. However, the Seremban High Court ruled that the annulment of the marriage was illegal and decided to return the custody of the children to the mother on 7 April 2014.

However, two days later Izwan kidnapped his son during a home visit by his ex-wife. Deepa quickly requested the High Court for police aid in getting her son back. Izwan decided to appeal the decision by the Seremban High Court and sought the help from the Shari'a court to assert his rights. The Court of Appeal rejected both appeals in December 2014. Child custody in February 2016 was finally divided by the Court of Appeal. The guard of the son was entrusted to the father, in this case, Izwan and the guard of the daughter to the mother, S Deepa. Asked by the media at the announcement of the verdict, she announced in tears: "This is injustice, I am upset. It was my last hope that the court would return my two children, but it was not so. Only my daughter was given to me."

== Denominations ==
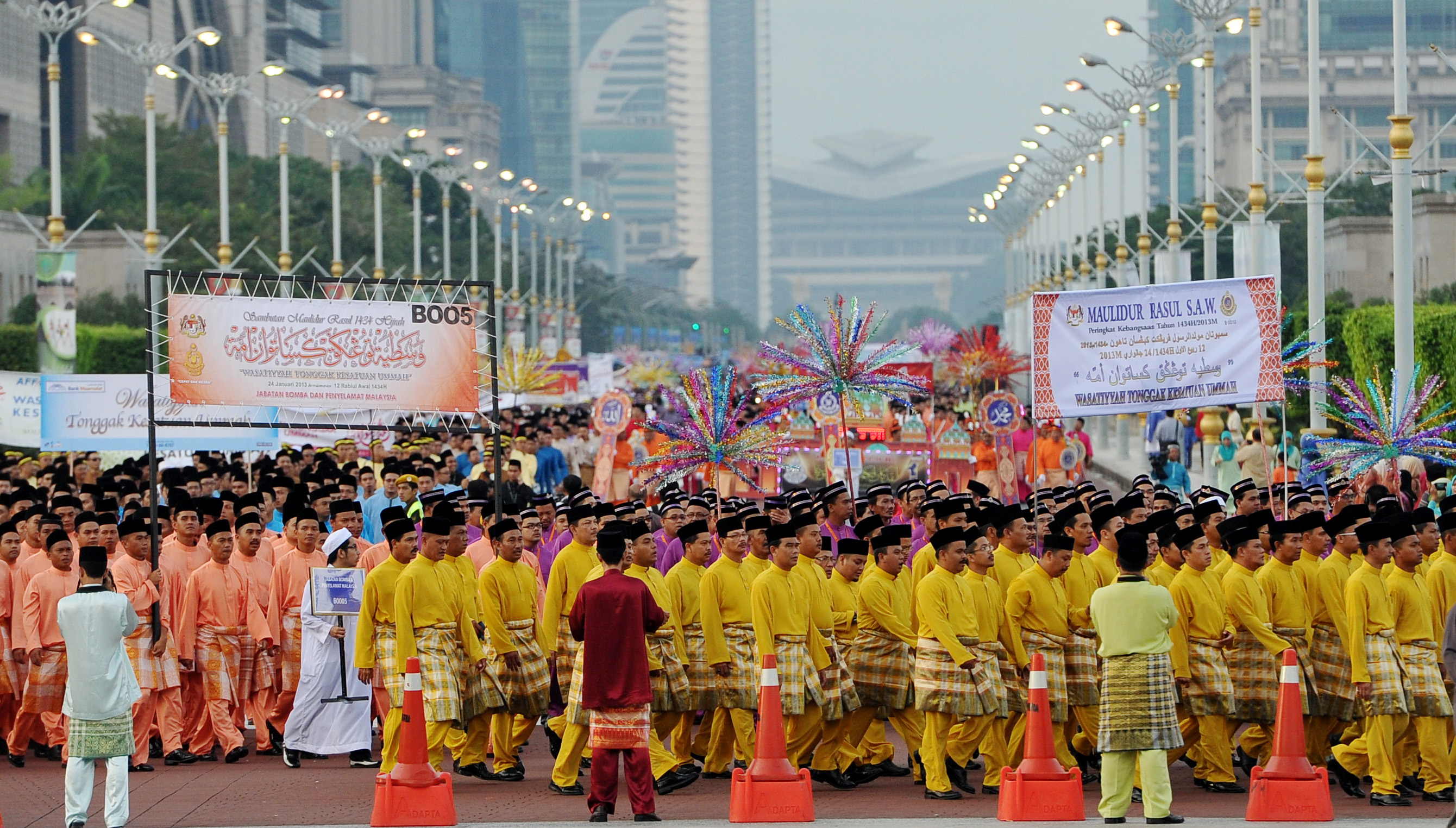
Malaysian Muslims participate in a Maulidur Rasul parade in Putrajaya, 2013

=== Sunni Islam ===
The Sunni Islam of the Shafi'i school of thought is the official, legal form in Malaysia, although many laws are influenced by the Hanafi school of thought.

Syncretist Islam with elements of Shamanism is still common in rural areas. Mosques are an ordinary scene throughout the country and azan (call to prayer) from minarets are heard five times a day. Government bodies and banking institutions are closed for two hours every Friday so Muslim workers can conduct Friday prayer in mosques. However, in certain states such as Kelantan, Terengganu, Kedah and Johor, the weekends fall on Friday and Saturday instead of Saturday and Sunday. It has been introduced to several states, notably Kelantan and Terengganu, all businesses close for 2 hours on every Friday for prayers. Failure to comply would result in fines.

Since it is compulsory for Muslims to perform a prayer 5 times a day no matter where they are, almost all public places, including shopping malls, hotels, condominiums, usually have allocated spaces called "Surau", for performing the Muslim prayers.

In 2017, it was reported that Salafism is spreading among Malaysia's elite, and that the traditional Islamic theology currently taught in Government schools is gradually being shifted to a view of theology derived from the Middle East, particularly Saudi Arabia. In addition, unlike other states in Malaysia that adhere to the Ash‘ari creed (Aqidah Asya‘irah) and follow the Shafi‘i school of thought in fiqh, the state of Perlis is the only state that practices the Salafi creed (Aqidah Salafi) and recognizes all Sunni schools of jurisprudence.

In the Meeting of the Aqidah Expert Panel of the Department of Islamic Development Malaysia (JAKIM) held on 28 December 2010 at the Malaysian Islamic Training Institute (ILIM), Bangi, Selangor, the panel decided that the definition of Ahl al-Sunnah wa’l-Jama‘ah is:

A group who understands and adheres to the Qur’an and the Sunnah of the Prophet SAW through the Companions, the Tabi‘in, and the Tabi‘ al-Tabi‘in, who remained steadfast with them in the principles of creed (aqidah), law (shari‘ah), and ethics (akhlaq).

Explanation of the definition:

- a) They are a group who understands and adheres to the Qur’an and the Sunnah of the Prophet SAW according to the methodology and approach of the salaf (the Ahl al-Hadith/Atharites) and khalaf (the Ash‘arites and the Maturidites).
- b) They are a group with a balanced (wasatiyyah) understanding — neither extreme nor overly lax. This excludes the Khawarij, Shi‘ah Rafidah, Qadariyyah, Jabariyyah, Mu‘tazilah, anti-hadith groups, liberal Islam, religious pluralism, and the like.
- c) They are a group who prioritizes Islamic unity and brotherhood over enmity, peace over conflict, and uphold the principle of not idolizing leaders, not being fanatical to the extent of declaring other Muslims as disbelievers (takfir) or deviants.

=== Shia Islam ===
The Malaysian government has strict policies against other Islamic sects, including a complete ban on Shia Islam, allegedly to "avoid violence between the two faiths that has sometimes broken out in other parts of the world by promoting only the Sunni faith". Deemed as a "deviant sect", Shia Islam is openly and freely demonised and Shia Muslims are oppressed in the country, their prayers and gatherings are broken up, and the state secret service allegedly engages in Shia forced disappearances. Anti-Shi'ism reaches such an extent that the mainstream media often presents Iran in a bad light while often glorying Saudi Arabia as part of the Iran–Saudi Arabia proxy war. For example, in 2019, Malaysian police raided multiple private functions commemorating the martyrdom of Husayn ibn Ali at the battle of Karbala, arresting scores of foreign and local Shia Muslims. While the true numbers are not known, the number of Malaysian Shia Muslims is estimated at around 250,000.

=== Other sects ===
A notable sect that has been outlawed is Al-Arqam.

Muslims who believe Mirza Ghulam Ahmad to be the fulfilment of the Islamic prophecies concerning the return of Jesus, the Ahmadiyya, are also present. There are approximately 2,000 Ahmadis in the country. Though small in number, they face state sanctioned persecution in Malaysia, as they do elsewhere in the Muslim world.

Muslims who reject the authority of Hadith, known as Quranists, Quraniyoon, or Ahl al-Quran, are also present in Malaysia. The most notable Malaysian Quranist is the scholar Kassim Ahmad.

== Cultural role ==
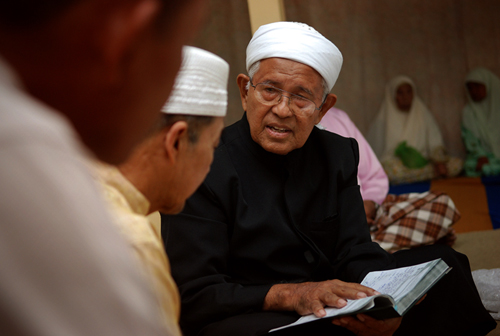
An Ustaz during the Akad Nikah marital ceremony

Islam is central to and dominant in Malay culture. A significant number of words in the Malay vocabulary can trace their origins to Arabic which is the common language of Islamic prayer and rituals. This is, however, not exclusive and words from other cultures such as Portuguese, Chinese, Dutch, Sanskrit, Tamil, English, and French can also be found in the Malay language. Islam is so ingrained in Malay life that Islamic rituals are practised as Malay culture. Muslim and Malays are interchangeable in many daily contexts.

Hari Raya Aidilfitri (Eid ul-Fitr) is an important festival celebrated by Malaysian Muslims.

Muslim women generally wear the tudung (hijab or headscarf) over their heads. However, Malay women not wearing any headgear are not reprimanded or penalised. Prominent Malaysian female examples are Rafidah Aziz, International Trade and Industry Minister and Siti Hasmah, wife of then Malaysian Prime Minister Mahathir Mohamad. However, with the influx of Arabic travellers, foreign Muslim women (Arabs) wearing hijab that leave only their eyes exposed are often spotted in tourist attractions, not the least at the shopping malls. At certain Malaysian institutions such as the International Islamic University, wearing of the tudung is mandatory; however, for non-Muslim students this usually amounts to a loosely worn piece of cloth draped over the back of the head.

Some regard the tudung to be an indication of Arabic influence in Malay Muslim culture, and point to incidents such as the banning of the traditional Malay wayang kulit in the state of Kelantan (which was ruled by the Islamist PAS) to be "un-Islamic".

Malaysia's top Islamic body, the National Fatwa Council, ruled against Muslims practising yoga, saying it had elements of other religions that could corrupt Muslims. The same body has ruled against ghosts and other supernatural beings.

== Political issues ==
=== Definition of Malay ===
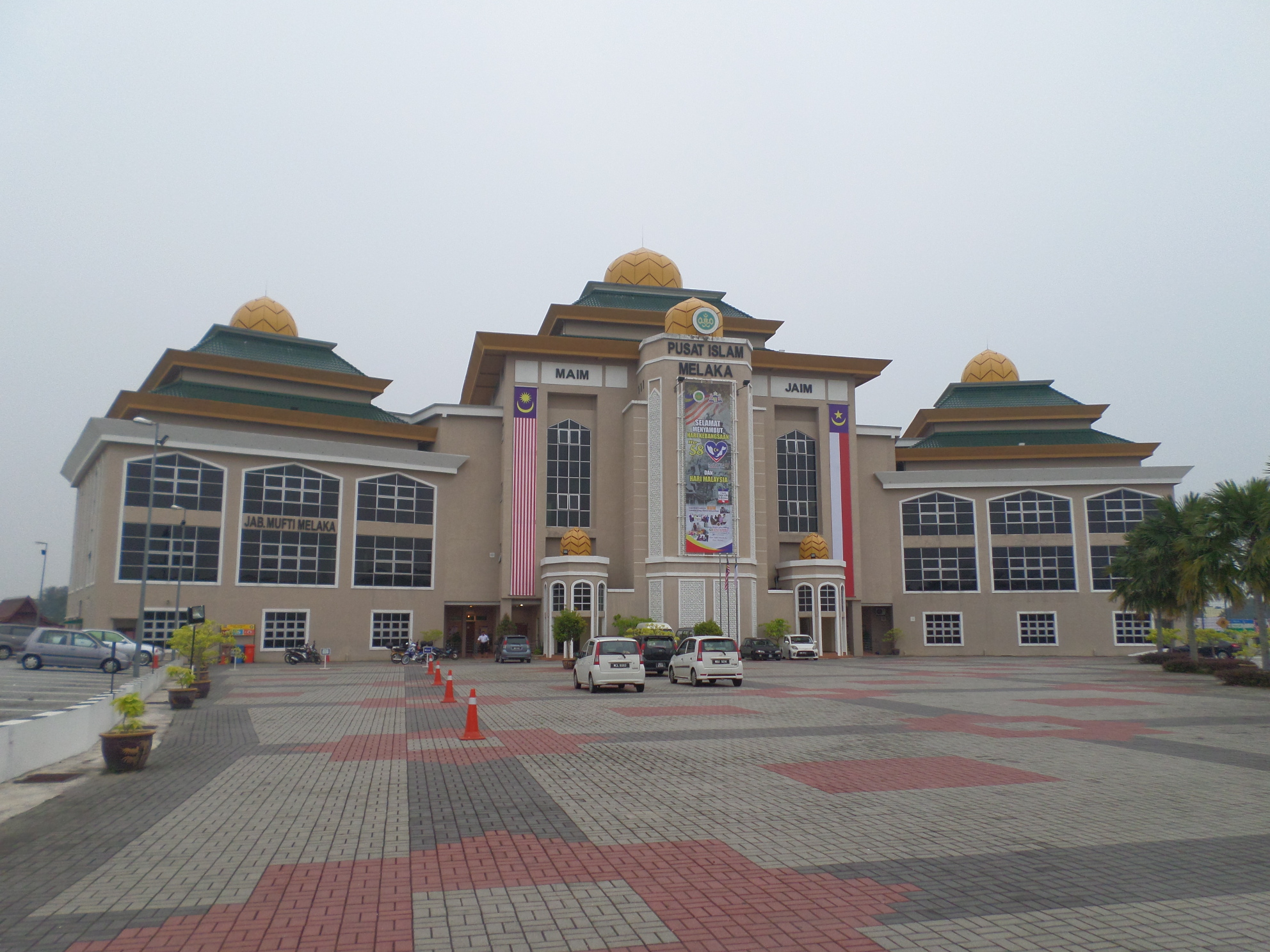
Malacca Islamic Centre

As defined by the Constitution of Malaysia, Malays must be Muslim, regardless of their ethnic heritage; otherwise, legally, they are not Malay. Consequently, apostate Malays would have to forfeit all their constitutional privileges, including their Bumiputra status, which entitles them to affirmative action in university admissions and discounts on purchases of vehicles or real estate. It is legally possible to become a Malay if a non-Malay citizen with a Malaysian parent converts to Islam and thus claims all the Bumiputra privileges granted by Article 153 of the Constitution and the New Economic Policy (NEP). However, the convert must "habitually speak the Malay language" and adhere to Malay culture. A tertiary textbook for Malaysian studies following the government-approved syllabus states: "This explains the fact that when a non-Malay embraces Islam, he is said to masuk Melayu ("become a Malay"). That person is automatically assumed to be fluent in the Malay language and to be living like a Malay as a result of his close association with the Malays".

Islam in Malaysia is thus closely associated with the Malay people, something some have criticised, for example saying that Malaysian Islam is "still clothed in communal garb; that Muslims in Malaysia have yet to understand what the universal spirit of Islam means in reality".

=== Sharia legal system ===
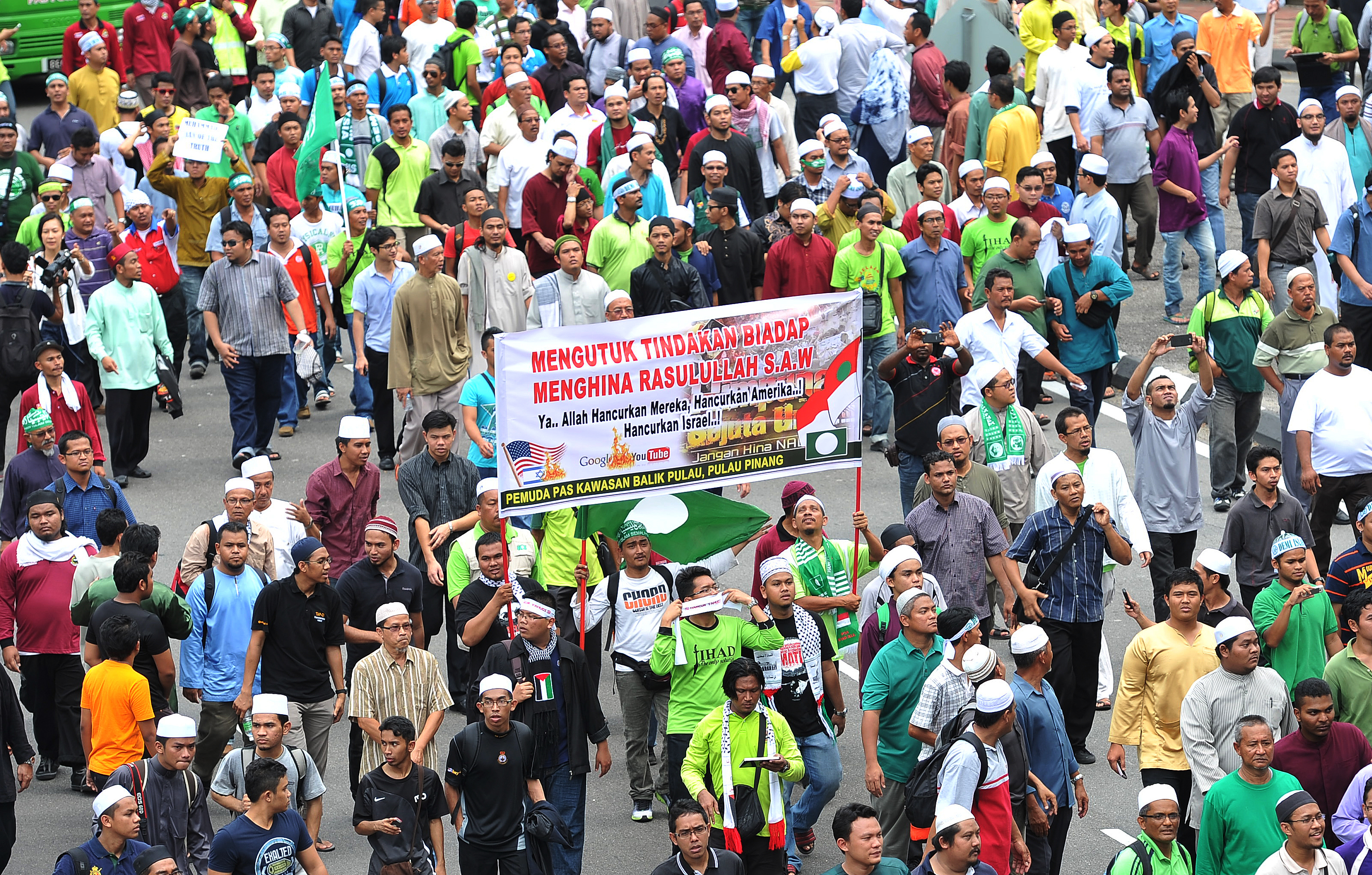
Protesters in Kuala Lumpur take to the streets to demonstrate against the Innocence of Muslims film

Parallel to the civil courts, there are Sharia courts which conduct legal matters related to Muslim family sphere. Legal issues like Muslim divorce and Muslim apostasy are conducted in the Syariah Courts. However, there are cases whereby apostasy cases are tried in the Federal Courts. Non-Muslims are not bound by Sharia.

=== Accusations of "Christian agendas" ===
Accusations of prosleytization have been used regularly by various Muslim politicians against Christians in order to court support from the Malays. There have been many instances of attacks on the Christian faith and they all point to political agendas by Malay-Muslim political parties. During the campaign for the 2022 Malaysian General Elections, Muhyiddin Yassin, the leader of Perikatan Nasional warned that his opponents were agents of a Jewish and Christian agenda out to colonize Malaysia.

== Clothing ==
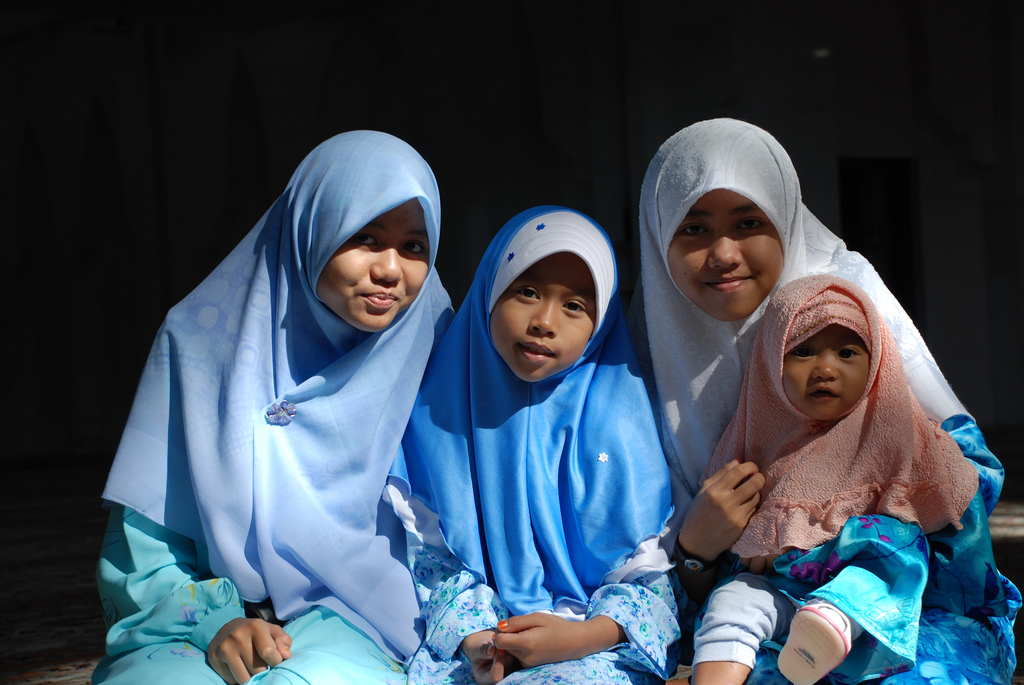
The tudung is very commonly worn by Malay girls and women

As of 2013, most Muslim Malaysian women wear the tudung, a type of hijab. This use of the tudung was uncommon prior to the 1979 Iranian Revolution, and the places that had women in tudung tended to be rural areas. The usage of the tudung sharply increased after the 1970s, as religious conservatism among Malay people in both Malaysia and Singapore increased.

Several members of the Kelantan ulama in the 1960s believed the hijab was not mandatory. However, in 2015 the majority of Malaysian ulama believed this previous viewpoint was un-Islamic. The National Fatwa Council has issued a ruling against young Muslim women wearing trousers.

Norhayati Kaprawi directed a 2011 documentary about the use of tudung in Malaysia, Siapa Aku? ("Who am I?").

Despite the hijab, or tudung being non-mandatory in Malaysia, some government buildings enforce within their premises a dresscode which bans women, Muslim and non-Muslim, from entering while wearing "revealing clothes".

In 2014, the feminist Muslim organization Sisters in Islam was named in a fatwa by the Selangor Islamic Religious Council. They had previously supported Muslim women who attempted to compete in the Miss Malaysia pageant before four had to withdraw.

== Distribution of Muslims ==
Distribution of Religions in Malaysia (2020 census)
1. Muslims (63.5%)
2. Buddhists (18.7%)
3. Christians (9.10%)
4. Hindus (6.10%)
5. Others [Bahais, Jains, Sikhs, Zoroastrians] (0.90%)
6. Atheists (1.80%)

According to the 2020 census, 63.5% of its population (20,623,140 people) were Muslim. Malays are officially defined as Muslims by virtue Article 160 in the Federal Constitution. Census from the Malaysian state of Sabah may also show higher proportion of Muslims due to mass Islamicization programmes in the 1970s and early 1980s and high presence of Muslim immigrants from Indonesia and the Philippines.

=== By gender and ethnic group ===
Gender	Total Muslim Population (2010 Census)	Malaysian Muslim Citizens					Non-Malaysian Muslim Citizens
Gender	Total Muslim Population (2010 Census)	Bumiputera Muslim		Non-Bumiputera Muslim			Non-Malaysian Muslim Citizens
Gender	Total Muslim Population (2010 Census)	Malay Muslim	Other Bumiputera Muslim	Chinese Muslim	Indian Muslim	Others Muslim	Non-Malaysian Muslim Citizens
Nationwide	17,375,794	14,191,720	1,347,208	42,048	78,702	102,334	1,613,782
Male Muslim	8,892,853	7,145,985	679,221	25,108	42,475	52,776	947,288
Female Muslim	8,482,941	7,045,735	667,987	16,940	36,227	49,558	666,494

=== By state/federal territory and ethnic group ===
State	Total Muslim Population (2010 Census)	Malaysian Muslim Citizens					Non-Malaysian Muslim Citizens
State	Total Muslim Population (2010 Census)	Bumiputera Muslim		Non-Bumiputera Muslim			Non-Malaysian Muslim Citizens
State	Total Muslim Population (2010 Census)	Malay Muslim	Other Bumiputera Muslim	Chinese Muslim	Indian Muslim	Other Non-Bumiputera Muslim	Non-Malaysian Muslim Citizens
Nationwide	17,375,794	14,191,720	1,347,208	42,048	78,702	102,334	1,613,782
Johor	1,949,393	1,759,537	13,068	4,074	8,318	5,896	158,500
Kedah	1,504,100	1,460,746	1,119	1,003	3,345	1,673	36,214
Kelantan	1,465,388	1,426,373	6,406	1,525	445	1,448	29,191
Kuala Lumpur	776,958	679,236	5,466	3,838	7,688	4,886	75,844
Labuan	66,065	30,001	24,083	522	195	1,235	10,029
Malacca	542,433	517,441	2,202	868	1,678	963	19,281
Negeri Sembilan	615,235	572,006	3,651	1,848	4,626	1,529	31,575
Pahang	1,124,909	1,052,774	8,651	1,002	2,244	4,313	55,925
Penang	696,846	636,146	1,251	1,290	12,335	1,628	44,196
Perak	1,301,931	1,238,357	15,387	1,367	7,537	1,764	37,519
Perlis	203,476	198,710	202	369	260	499	3,436
Putrajaya	70,522	68,475	406	104	68	50	1,419
Sabah	2,096,153	184,197	1,106,042	9,591	3,164	40,216	752,943
Sarawak	796,239	568,113	134,340	4,037	1,892	2,433	85,424
Selangor	3,161,994	2,814,597	23,804	10,241	24,472	32,829	256,051
Terengganu	1,004,152	985,011	1,130	369	435	972	16,235

== Islam-related tourist attractions ==
- Islamic Arts Museum Malaysia
- Islamic Heritage Museum
- Kelantan Islamic Museum
- Malacca Al-Quran Museum
- Malacca Islamic Museum
- Malay and Islamic World Museum
- Penang Islamic Museum

== See also ==
- Outline of Islam
- Glossary of Islam
- Islam in Southeast Asia
- Index of Islam-related articles
- Arabization in Malaysia
- Freedom of religion in Malaysia
- Islam by country
- Religion in Malaysia
- Tabung Haji

== Bibliography ==
The following list of selected printed bibliographies on the topic includes both cited works and further reading.

- Abdullah, Kamarulnizam (2020). "Political Islam and Democracy in Malaysia". In Verma, Vidhu; Rathore, Aakash Singh (eds.). Secularism, Religion, and Democracy in Southeast Asia. Oxford: Oxford University Press. pp. 88–110. ISBN 978-0-19-909877-4.
- Ali, Muhamad (2008). "Islam i Sydostasien" [Islam in Southeast Asia]. In Simonsen, Jorgen Baek (ed.). Politikens Bog Om Islam (in Danish). København, Denmark: Politikens Forlag. pp. 315–347. ISBN 978-87-567-7477-3.
- ——— (2011). "Eclecticism of Modern Islam: Islam Hadhari in Malaysia". Studia Islamika. 18 (1): 1–30. doi:10.15408/sdi.v18i1.439 (inactive 1 October 2026).
- ——— (2016). Islam and Colonialism: Becoming Modern in Indonesia and Malaya. Edinburgh: Edinburgh University Press. ISBN 978-1-4744-0920-9.
- Ali, Wan Zailan Kamaruddin Wan (1994–95). "Aliran Syi'ah di Nusantara: Perkembangan, Pengaruh dan Kesan" [The Shi'ite Movement in the Archipelago: Development, Influence and Effects]. Sejarah: Jurnal Jabatan Sejarah Universiti Malaya (in Malay). 3 (3): 67–93. doi:10.22452/sejarah.vol3no3.4. ISSN 1985-0611.
- Amir, Ahmad Nabil; Rahman, Tasnim Abdul (2024). "Islamic Movement in Malaysia: History and Tradition". International Journal of Kita Kreatif. 3 (3). Syiah Kuala University: 28–41. doi:10.24815/ijkk.v1i1.37619.
- Arif, Nasr M.; Panakkal, Abbas, eds. (2024). Southeast Asian Islam: Integration and Indigenisation. London; New York: Routledge. ISBN 978-1-032-45169-5.
- Bakri, Syamsul (2020). Islam Melayu: Mozaik Kebudayaan Islam di Singapura dan Brunei (in Indonesian). [Surakarta]: Aksara Solopos. ISBN 978-623-92514-1-3.
- Esposito, John L., ed. (1995). "Malaysia". The Oxford Encyclopedia of the Modern Islamic World: 4-volume Set. Vol. 3. New York; Oxford: Oxford University Press. ISBN 0-19-509614-2.
- Freedman, Amy L. (2020). "Religious Minorities in Southeast Asia: The Ahmadiyah and Why Tolerance Matters". In Verma, Vidhu; Rathore, Aakash Singh (eds.). Secularism, Religion, and Democracy in Southeast Asia. Oxford: Oxford University Press. pp. 135–160. ISBN 978-0-19-909877-4.
- Gross, L. Max (2016). A Muslim archipelago: Islam and Politics in Southeast Asia. Washington, D.C.: National Defense Intelligence College. ISBN 978-1-932946-19-2.
- Hassan, M. Kamal (2005). "Islam". In Kamal, Hassan M.; Basri, Ghazali bin (eds.). The Encyclopedia of Malaysia. Vol. 10: Religions and Beliefs. Singapore: Editions Didier Millet. ISBN 981-3018-51-8. Archived from the original on 27 May 2012.
- Helmiati (2007). Islam dalam Masyarakat dan Politik Malaysia (PDF) (in Indonesian). Pekanbaru: Suska Press. ISBN 978-979-1288-11-8.
- Hooker, Virginia Matheson; Othman, Norani, eds. (2003). Malaysia: Islam, Society and Politics. ISEAS Series on Islam. Singapore: Institute of Southeast Asian Studies (ISEAS). ISBN 981-230-161-5.
- Kähler, H. (1975). "Der Islam bei den Kap-Malaien" [Islam Among the Tanjung Malays]. Handbook of Oriental Studies. Section 3. Southeast Asia, Religions (in German). Leiden: Brill. pp. 127–134.
- Kamali, Mohammad Hashim (2000). Islamic Law in Malaysia: Issues and Developments. Kuala Lumpur: Ilmiah Publishers. ISBN 983-2092-27-2.
- Martinez, Patricia A. (December 2001). "The Islamic State or the State of Islam in Malaysia". Contemporary Southeast Asia. 23 (3) CS23-3E: 474–503. doi:10.1355/CS23-3E. Archived from the original on 8 October 2015 – via Questia.
- Mas'od, Mohd Aizam bin (2013). Diskusi Isu Aqidah & Pemikiran Semasa di Malaysia (PDF) (in Malayalam). Putrajaya: Jabatan Kemajuan Islam Malaysia. ISBN 978-983-042-533-7.
- Moustafa, Tamir (2018). Constituting Religion: Islam, Liberal Rights, and the Malaysian State. Cambridge: Cambridge University Press. ISBN 978-110-853-929-6.
- Mutalib, Hussin (2008). "Chap. 3. Malaysia". Islam in Southeast Asia. Southeast Asia Background Series, 11. Singapore: ISEAS–Yusof Ishak Institute. pp. 25–40. ISBN 978-981-230-759-0.
- Nash, Manning (1991). "Islamic Resurgence in Malaysia and Indonesia". In Marty, Martin E.; Appleby, R. Scott (eds.). Fundamentalisms Observed. The Fundamentalism Project, 1. Chicago, Il; London: University of Chicago Press. pp. 691–739. ISBN 0-226-50878-1.
- Peacock, James L. (1978). "Chapter 6. Malaya". Muslim Puritans: Reformist Psychology in Southeast Asian Islam. Berkeley and Los Angeles, Ca: University of California Press. pp. 175–186. ISBN 0-520-03403-1.
- Peletz, Michael G. (2002). Islamic Modern: Religious Courts and Cultural Politics in Malaysia. Princeton, NJ: Princeton University Press. ISBN 0-691-09508-6.
- Riddel, Peter G. (2001). Islam and the Malay-Indonesian World: Transmission and Responses. Honolulu: University of Hawai'i Press. ISBN 0-8248-2473-3.
- Saifullah (2010). Sejarah & Kebudayaan Islam di Asia Tenggara (in Indonesian). Yogyakarta: Pustaka Pelajar. ISBN 978-602-8764-68-1.
- Rumahuru, Yance Zadrak (2013). Sofjan, Dicky (ed.). Sejarah & Budaya Syiah di Asia Tenggara [Shia's History and Culture in Southeast Asia] (in Indonesian). Yogyakarta: Penerbit Sekolah Pascasarjana Universitas Gadjah Mada. doi:10.31219/osf.io/ucy54. ISBN 978-979-25-0118-6.
- Wiryomartono, Bagoes (2023). Historical Mosques in Indonesia and Malaysia World: Roots, Transformations, and Developments (PDF). Singapore: Springer. ISBN 978-981-99-3805-6.
