= Zhenghe =

Zhenghe or Zheng He may refer to:

== People ==
- Zheng He (1371–1433), Ming dynasty admiral and explorer
- Zheng He (general) (1958–), general of the People's Liberation Army

== Transport ==
- Chinese ship Zheng He, a Chinese People's Liberation Army Navy training ship
- ROCS Cheng Ho, a Republic of China Navy Cheng Kung-class frigate
- Tianwen-2, a Chinese unmanned spacecraft previously called ZhengHe
- USS Cheng Ho, a United States Navy auxiliary ship

== Locations ==
- Zhenghe County, county in Fujian, China
- Zhenghe, Hunan (正和), town in Guiyang County, Hunan, China
- Zhenghe Township (郑河), township in Zhuanglang County, Gansu, China

== Historical eras ==
- Zhenghe (征和, 92–89 BC), an era name of Emperor Wu of Han
- Zhenghe (政和, 1111–1118), an era name of Emperor Huizong of Song
