= Jonker Walk =

Chinatown in Malacca City, Malaysia

- Jonker Street; Jalan Hang Jebat
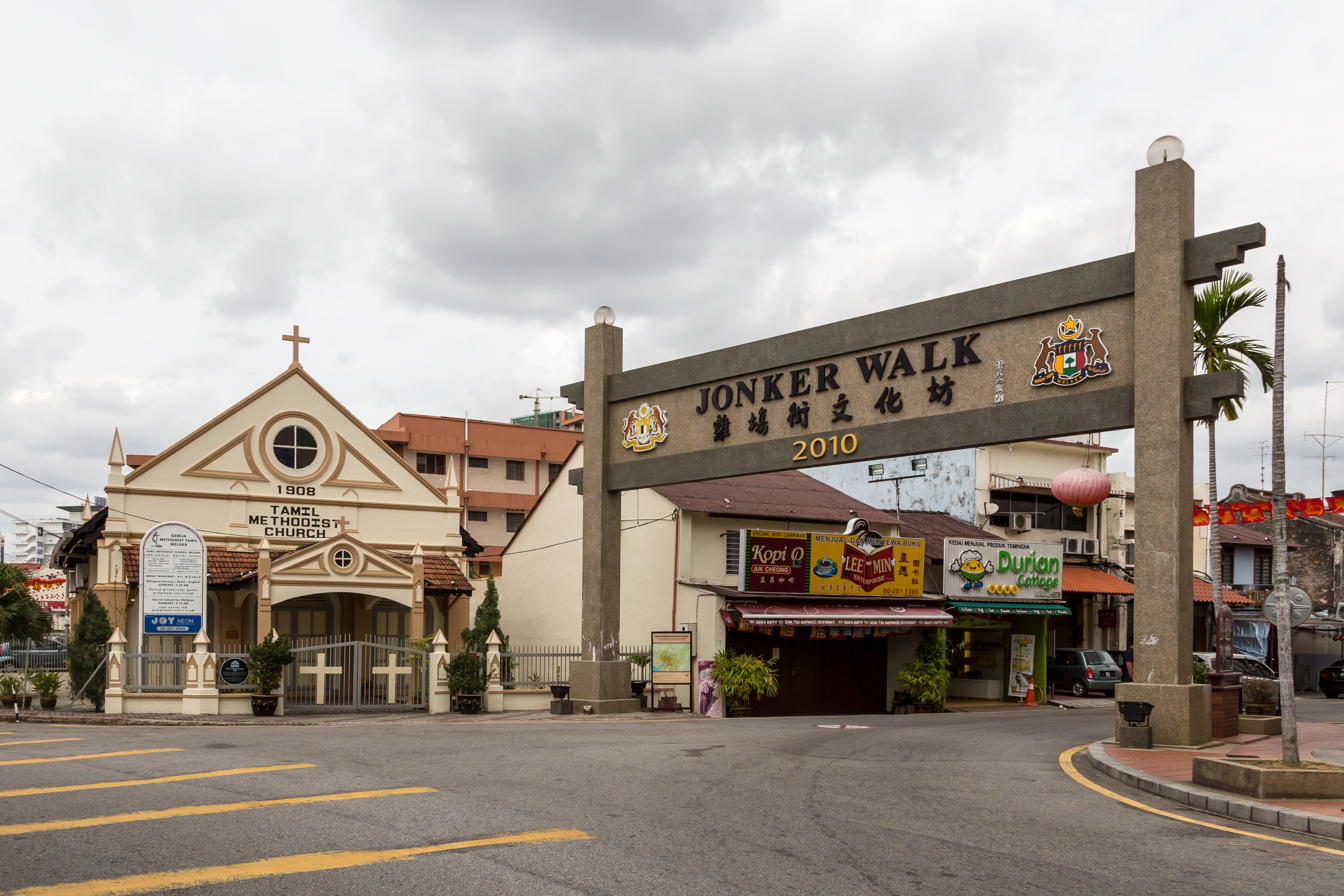
- Tamil Methodist Church in Jonker Street

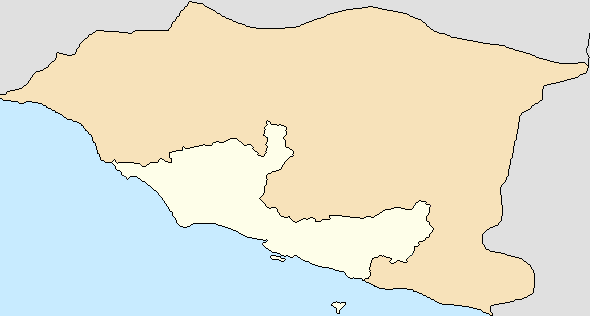
- Location within Malacca City
- Native name: Persiaran Jonker (Malay)
- Location: Malacca City, Malacca, Malaysia
- Coordinates: 2°11′48.2″N 102°14′47.5″E

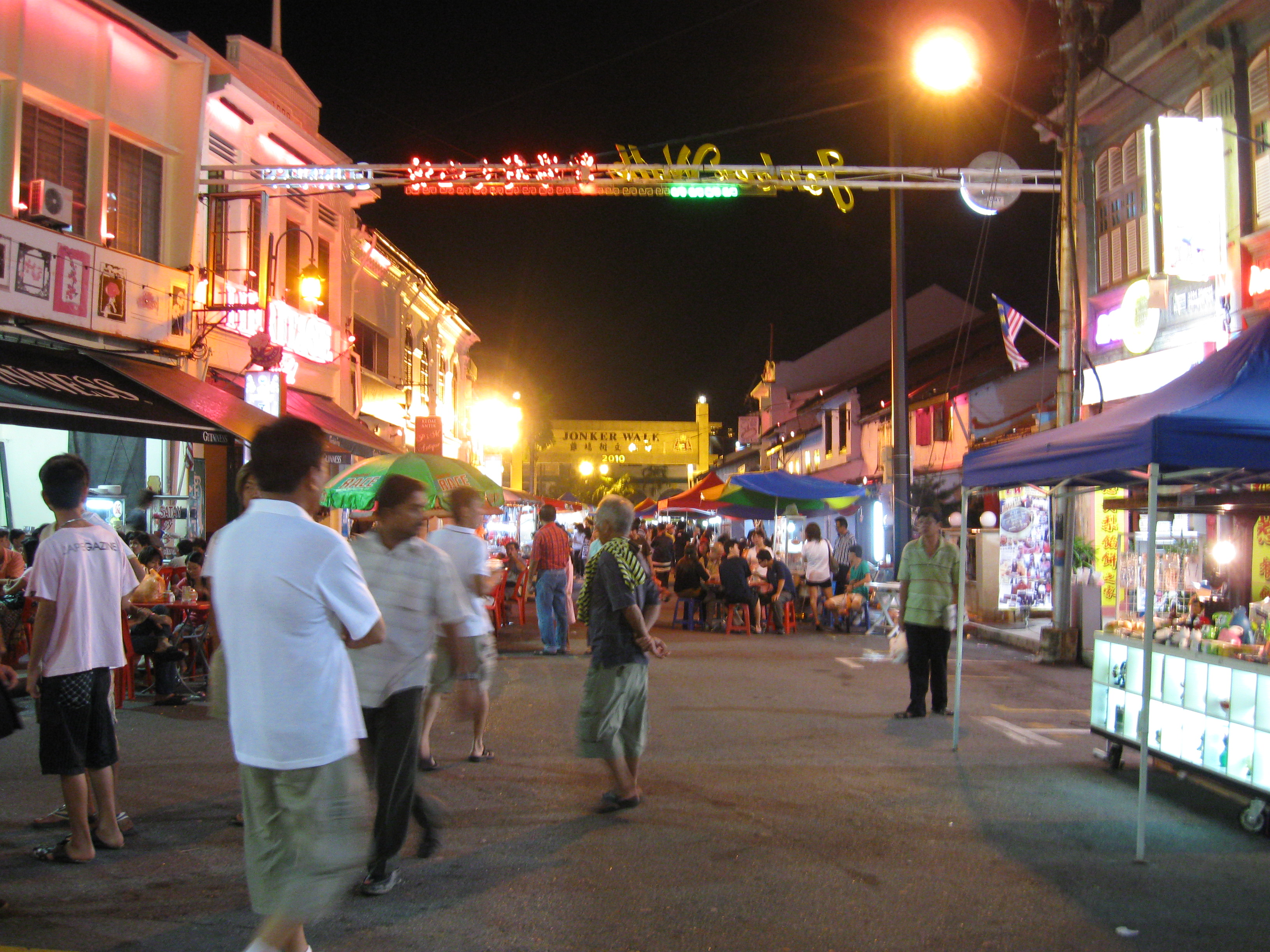
Night market along Jonker Walk

The Jonker Walk (Malay: Persiaran Jonker, Chinese: 鷄場街; pinyin: Jīcháng jiē) is the Chinatown area in Malacca City in the state of Malacca, Malaysia located along Jonker Street (Malay: Jalan Hang Jebat). It starts from across Malacca River near the Stadthuys, with the street in the area filled with historical houses along its left and right sides dating back to the 17th century, many of which are shops selling antiques, textiles, foods, handicrafts and souvenirs such as keychains and shirts. The area turns into a night market every Friday, Saturday and Sunday in the evening from 6 p.m. until 12 midnight, with its street blocked for traffic.

== Tourist attractions ==
Attractions along and around the streets are:

- Baba Nyonya Heritage Museum
- Cheng Ho Cultural Museum
- Cheng Hoon Teng Temple
- Hang Jebat Mausoleum
- Hang Kasturi Mausoleum
- Kampung Hulu Mosque
- Kampung Kling Mosque
- Sri Poyatha Moorthi Temple
- Straits Chinese Jewellery Museum
- Tamil Methodist Church

== Galleries ==
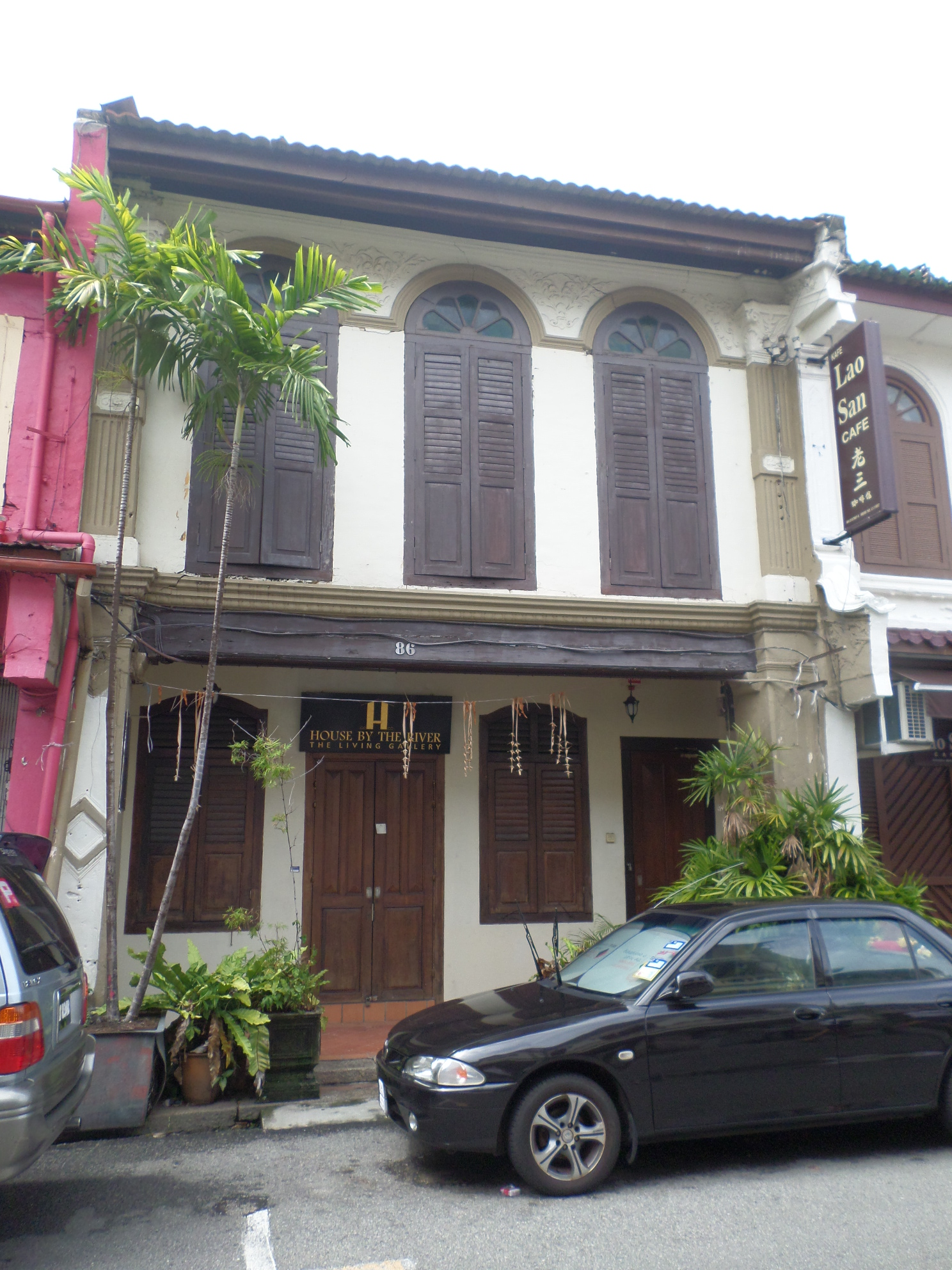
House by the River Living Gallery

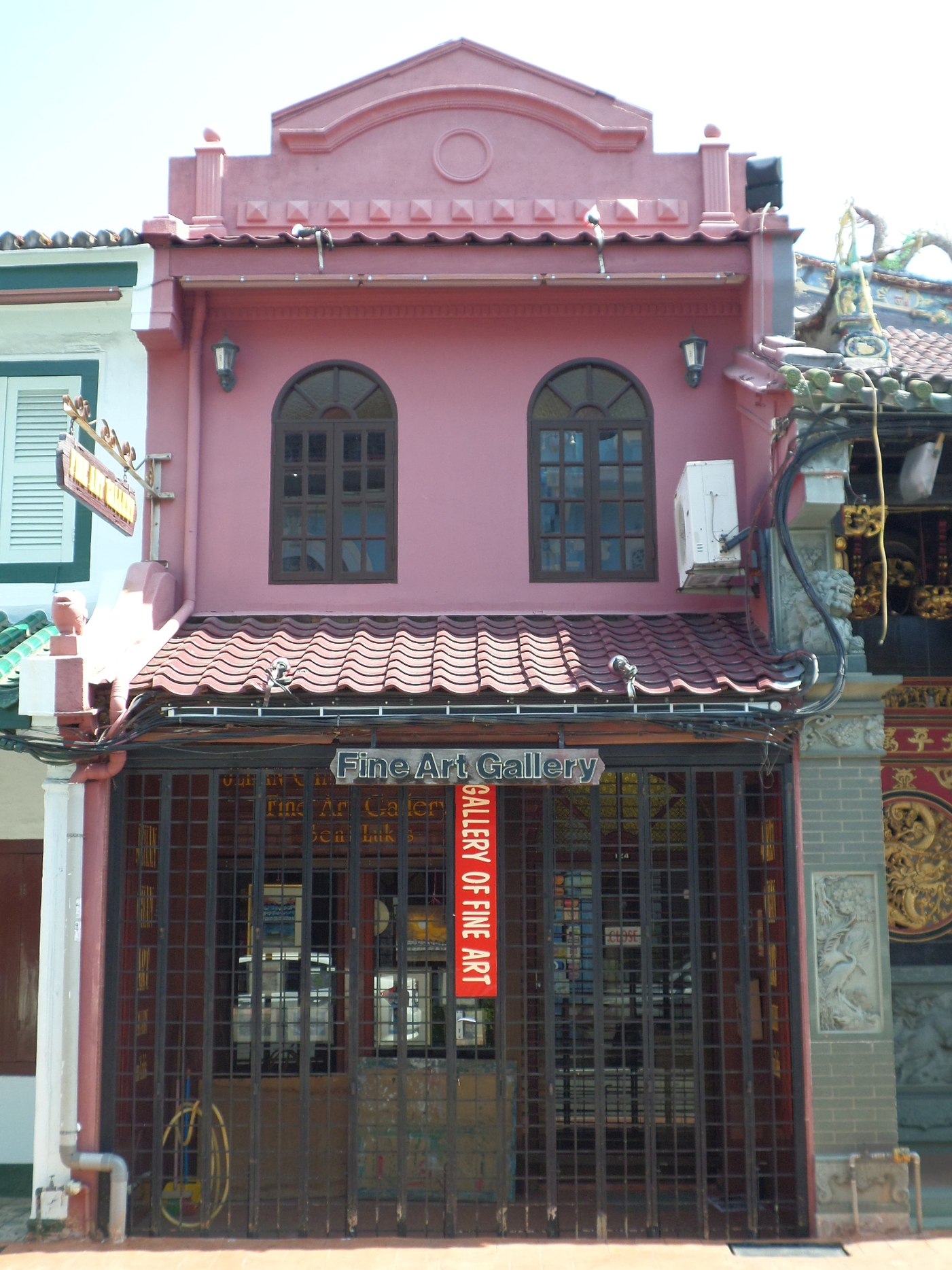
Jehan Chan Art Gallery

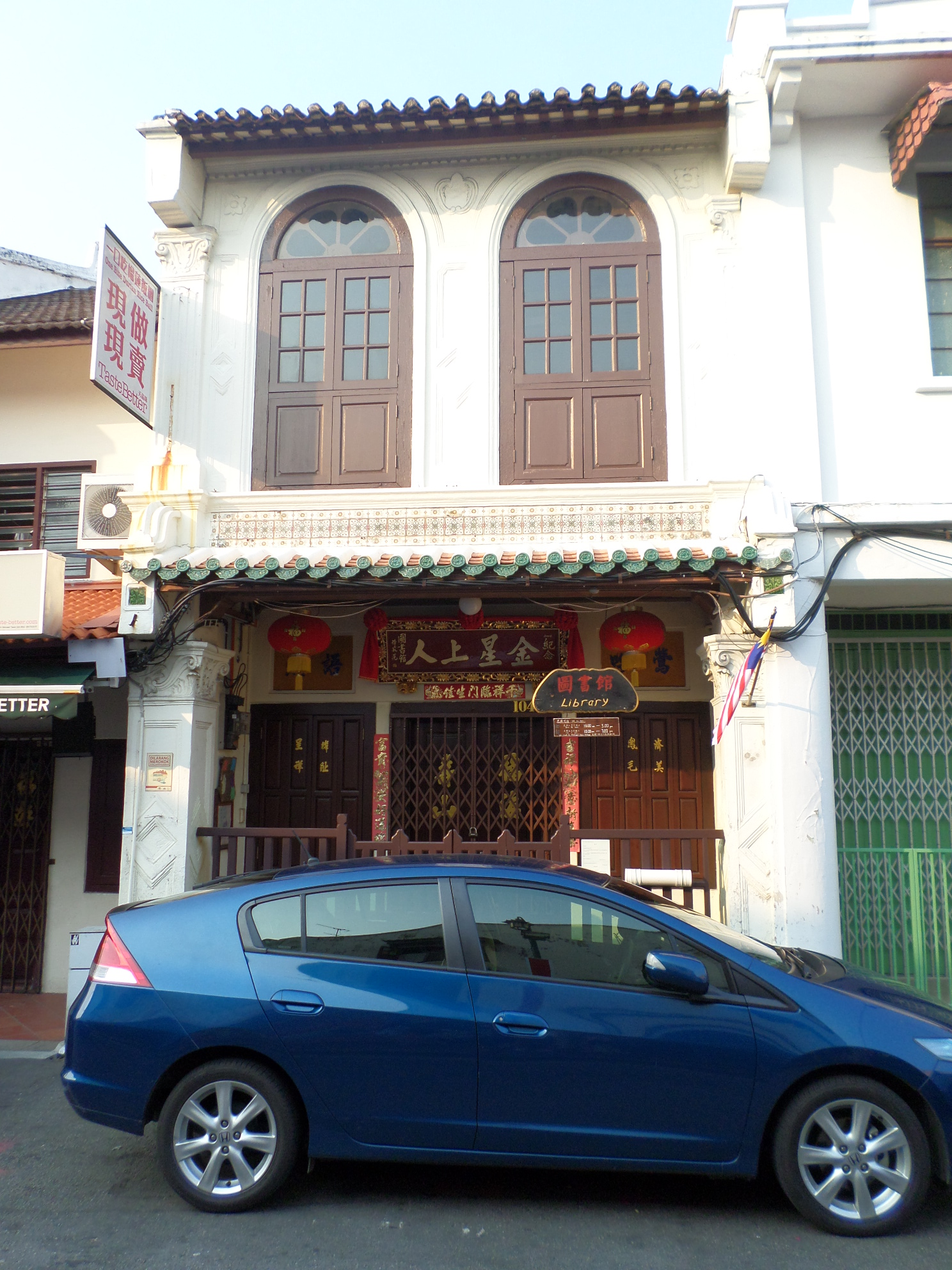
Jonker Street Library

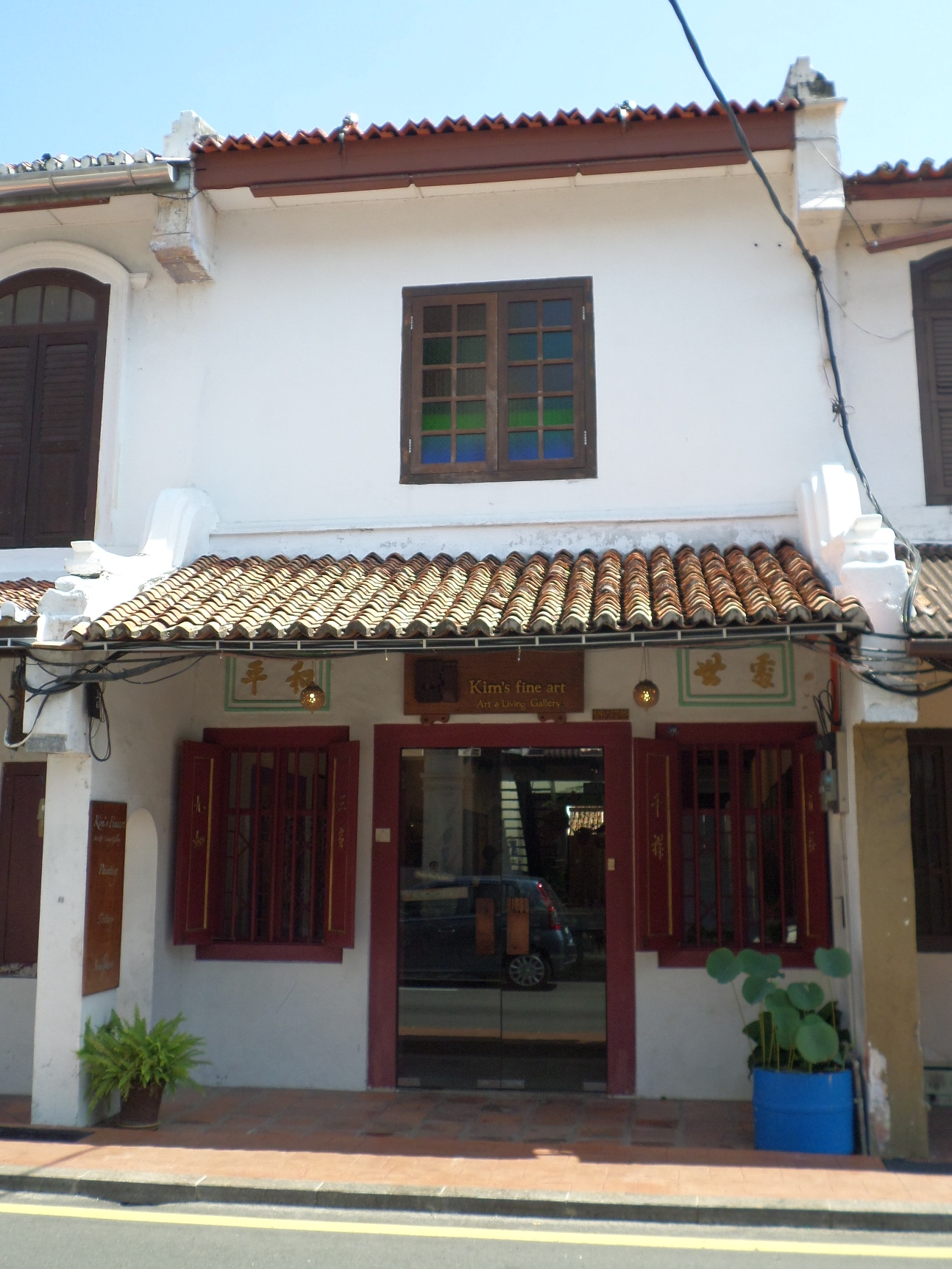
Kim's Art and Living Gallery

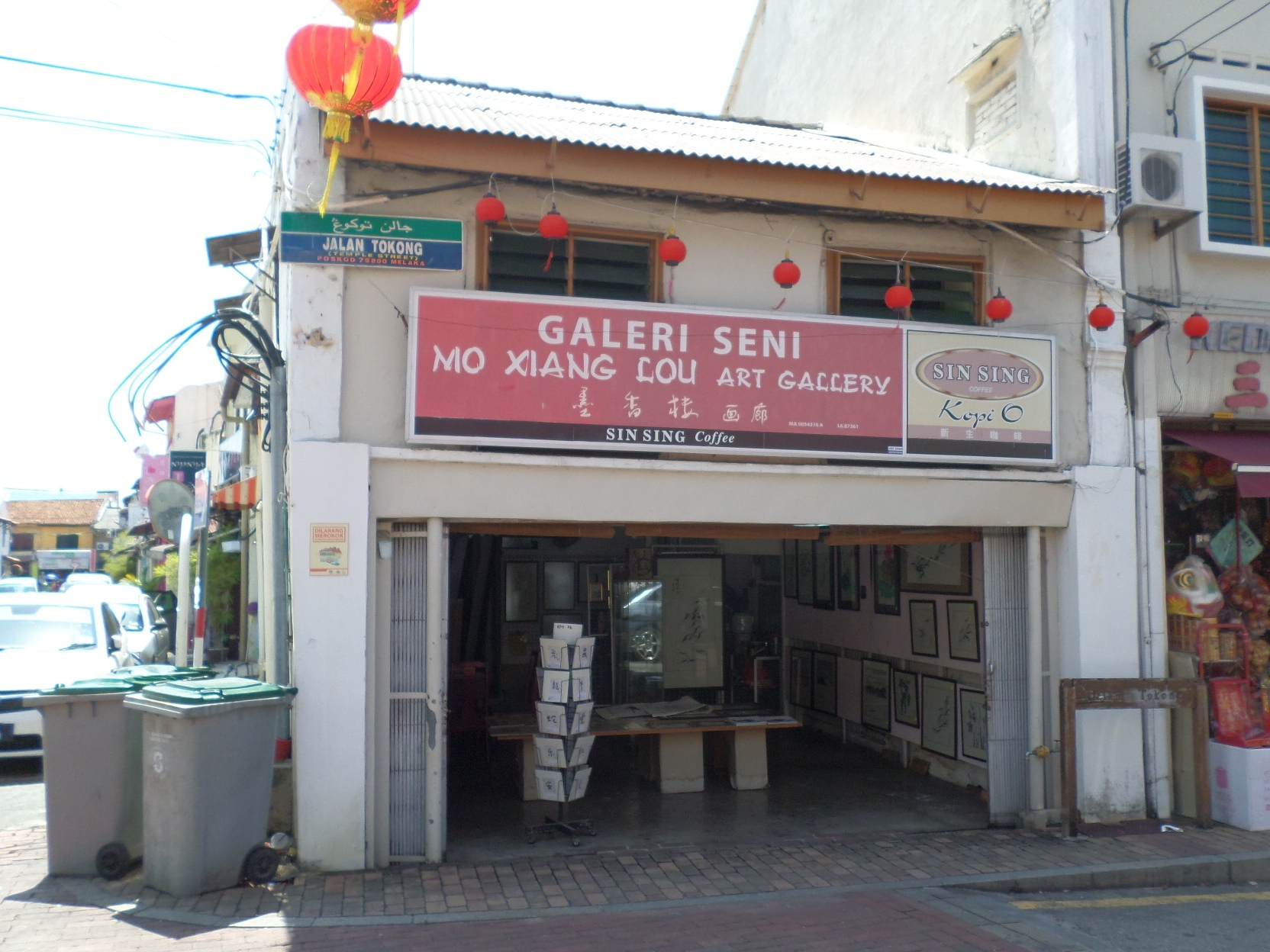
Mo Xiang Lou Art Gallery

== See also ==
- List of tourist attractions in Melaka
- Petaling Street, Kuala Lumpur
