= List of ship commissionings in 1986 =

The list of ship commissionings in 1986 includes a chronological list of all ships commissioned in 1986.

Date	Operator	Ship	Pennant	Class and type	Notes
January 15	Royal Netherlands Navy	Jacob van Heemskerck	F812	Jacob van Heemskerck-class frigate	
January 18	United States Navy	Valley Forge	CG-50	Ticonderoga-class cruiser	
8 February	United States Navy	Germantown	LSD-42	Whidbey Island-class dock landing ship	
March 6	United States Navy	1st Lt. Jack Lummus	T-AK-3011	2nd Lt. John P. Bobo class dry cargo ship	operated by the American Overseas Marine Corporation under Military Sealift Command direction
April 12	United States Navy	Samuel B. Roberts	FFG-58	Oliver Hazard Perry-class frigate	
July 9	Royal Netherlands Navy	Schiedam	M860	Alkmaar-class minehunter	
September 17	Royal Netherlands Navy	Witte de With	F813	Jacob van Heemskerck-class frigate	
September (unknown date)	Chilean Navy	Almirante Latorre	D14	County-class destroyer	Ex-HMS Glamorgan, purchased from the Royal Navy
20 September	United States Navy	Bunker Hill	CG-52	Ticonderoga-class cruiser	
October 11	French Navy	Vulcain	M611	Vulcain-class minesweeper	
October 25	United States Navy	Theodore Roosevelt	CVN-71	Nimitz-class aircraft carrier	
December 10	Royal Netherlands Navy	Middelburg	M858	Alkmaar-class minehunter	
December 10	Royal Netherlands Navy	Urk	M861	Alkmaar-class minehunter	
December 30	People's Liberation Army Navy	Zheng He	AX-81	Type 679 training ship	Built at Jiangnan Shipyard for Dalian Naval Academy
