= Cheng Ho Cultural Museum =

Museum in Melaka Tengah, Malacca, Malaysia

- Muzium Budaya Cheng Ho
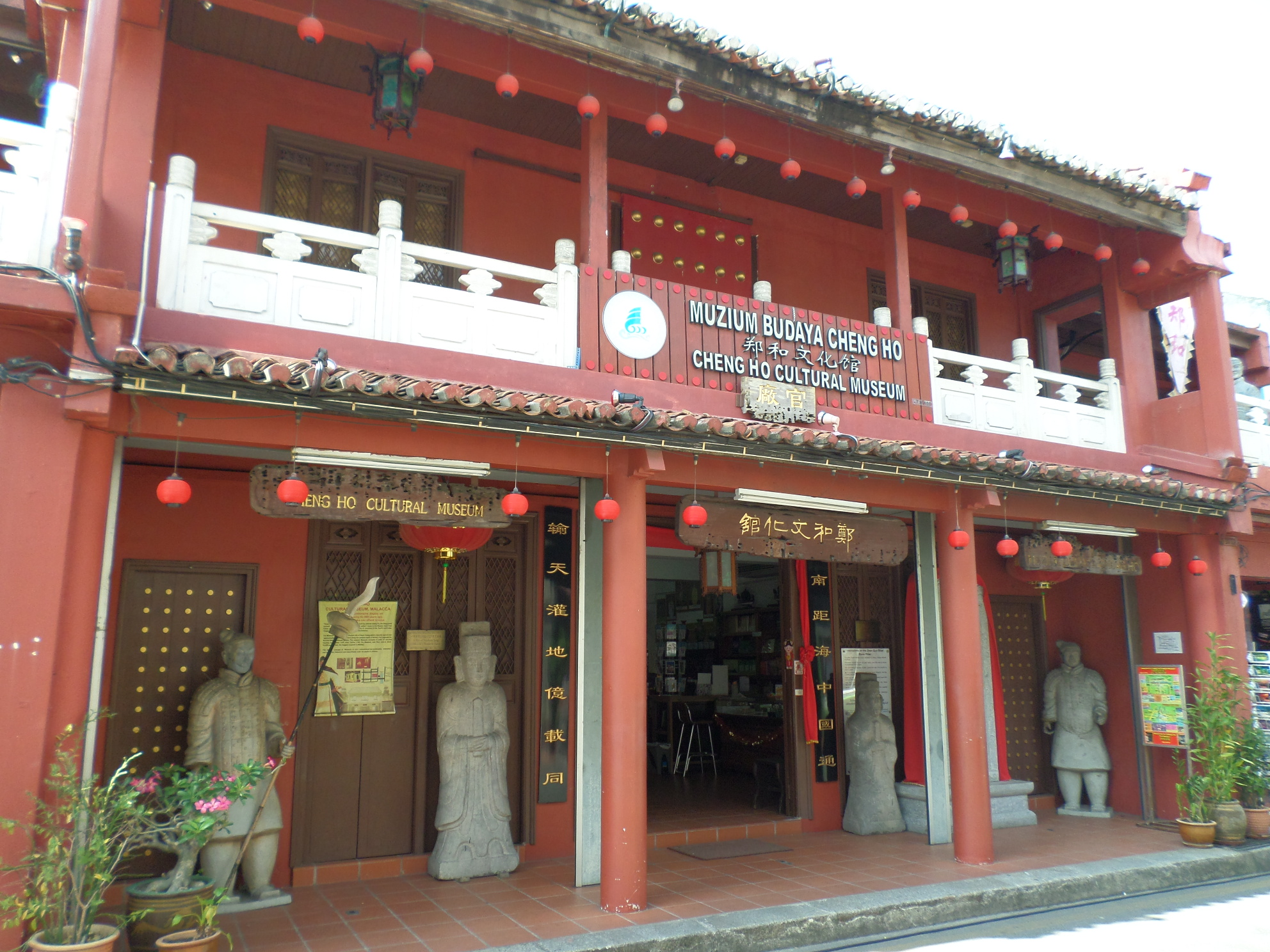
- Established: 2006
- Location: Malacca City, Malacca, Malaysia
- Coordinates: 2°11′43.3″N 102°14′54.9″E
- Type: museum
- Founder: Tan Ta Sen

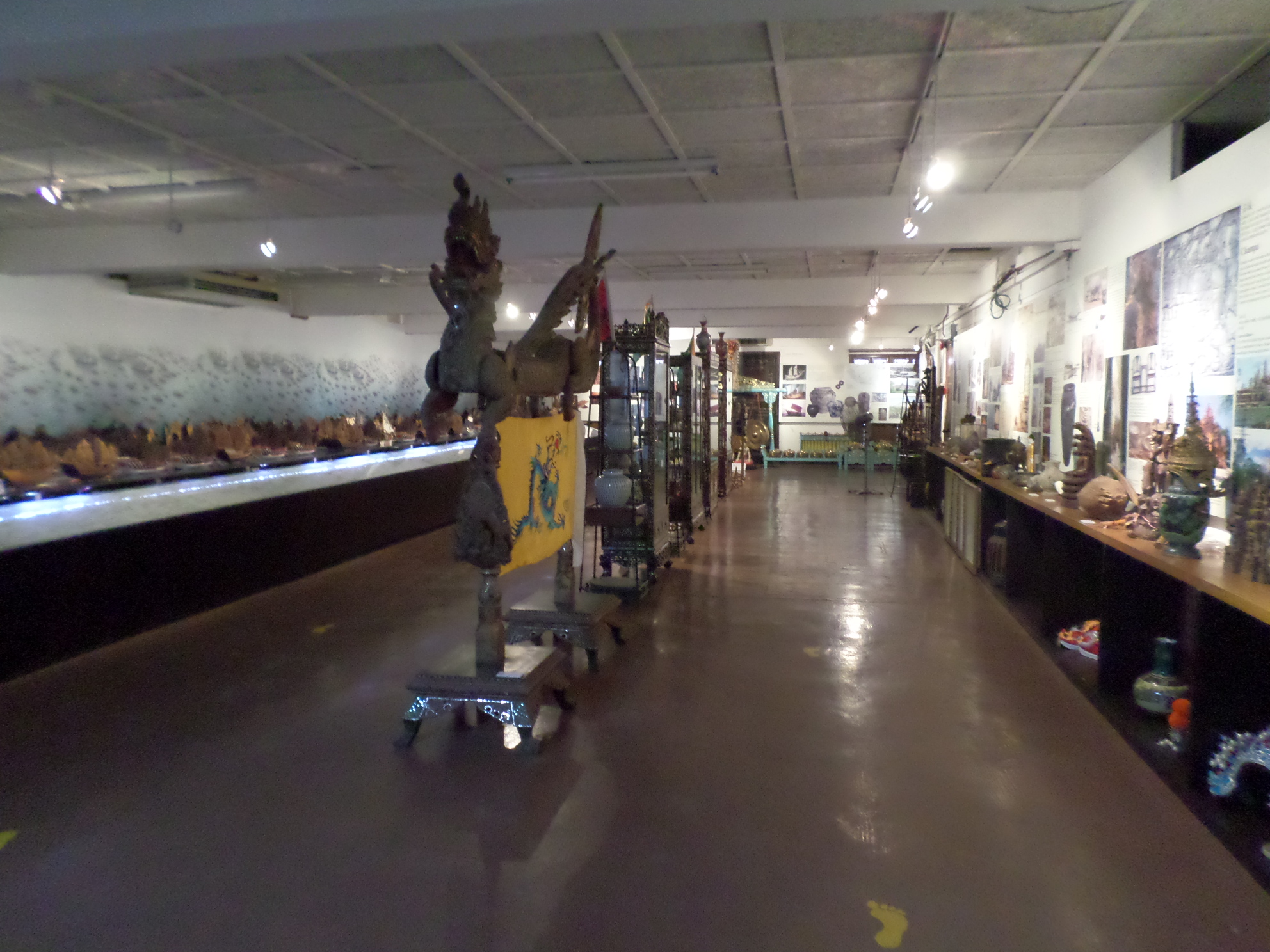
Cheng Ho Cultural Museum exhibition hall

Cheng Ho Cultural Museum (Malay: Muzium Budaya Cheng Ho; Chinese: 郑和文化馆) is a museum about the life of Zheng He in Malacca City, Malacca, Malaysia.

== History ==
The museum was founded and opened in 2006 by Tan Ta Sen, who is also the president of International Zheng He Society.

== Architecture ==
The museum is the largest in the state; it covers a total floor area of 5,110 m; divided into three levels and occupies eight units of old shop houses. Some of the shops were built before 1786. A drum and a bell tower are located in front of the museum.

The museum building is believed to sit at the original site of the warehouse complex Guan Chang, built by Zheng He around 600 years ago to temporarily store goods he acquired during his travels. The warehouse complex originally occupied 10 acres of lowland along the northern bank of Malacca River. Five Ming-era wells were unearthed during the museum's construction.

== Exhibitions ==
The museum exhibits the life of Zheng He and his world voyage in his fleets. It displays his travel with big pictures of Chinese history. The museum can roughly be divided into several sections, which are: Old Malacca Village, Ship Gallery, Treasure Ship, Antique Gallery and Garden Courtyard. It opens everyday from 9.00 a.m. to 06.30 p.m.

== See also ==
- List of museums in Malaysia
- List of tourist attractions in Malacca
- Gallery of Admiral Cheng Ho
