= Gallery of Admiral Cheng Ho =

Gallery in Melaka Tengah, Malacca, Malaysia

- Galeri Laksamana Cheng Ho
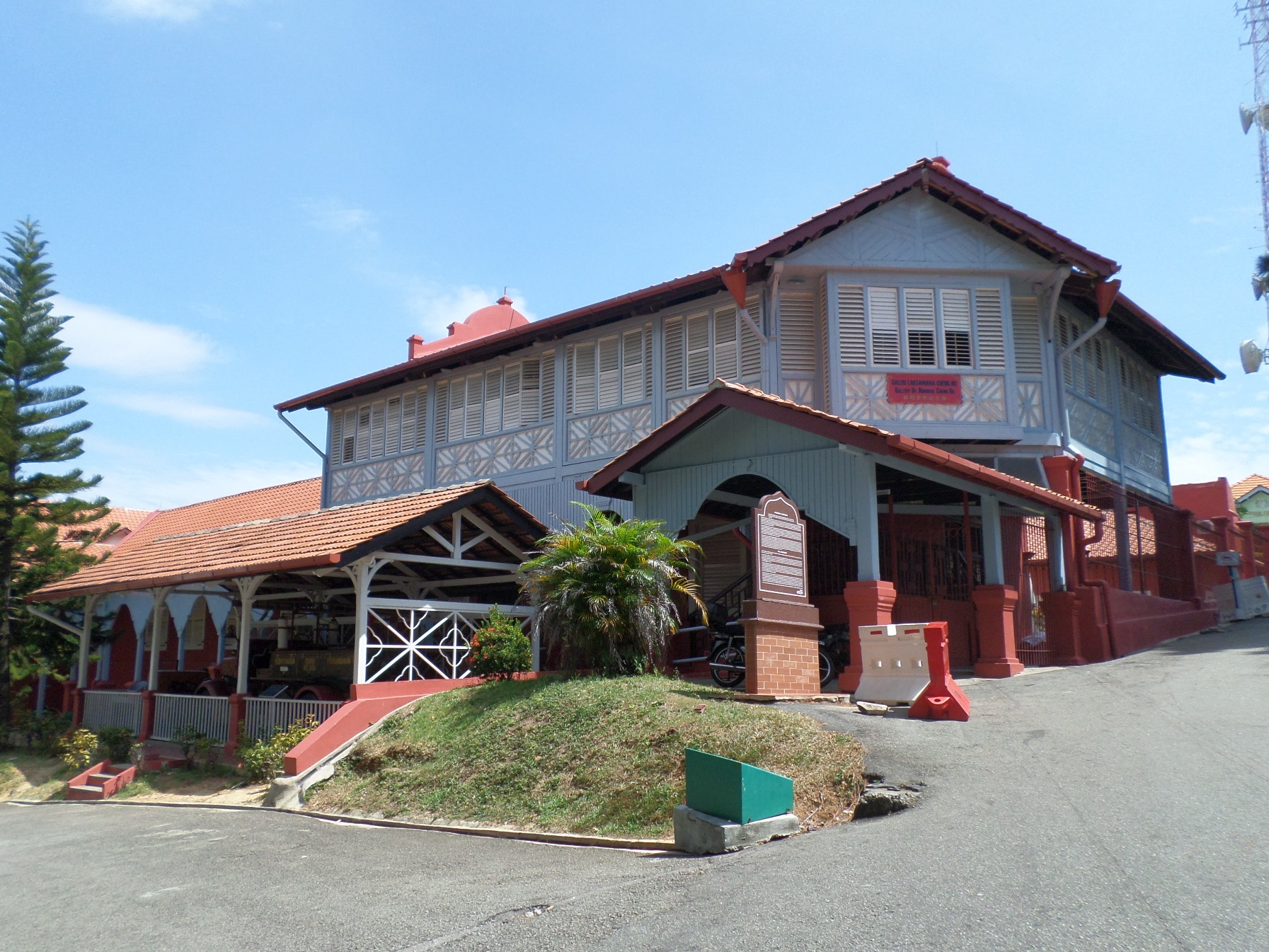
- Established: February 2003
- Location: Malacca City, Malacca, Malaysia
- Coordinates: 2°11′37.4″N 102°14′56.8″E
- Type: gallery

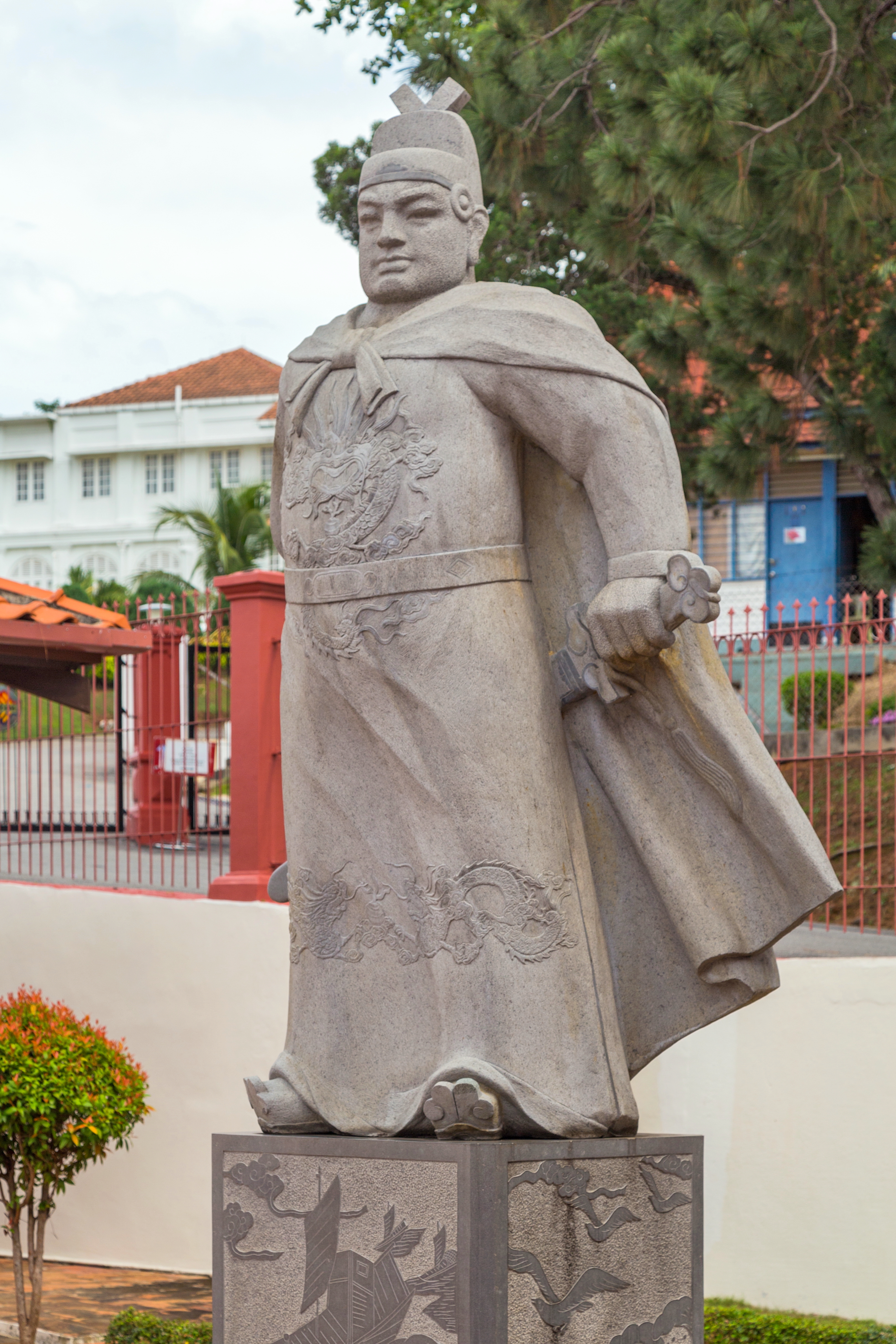
Statue of Zheng He at the gallery

The Gallery of Admiral Cheng Ho (Malay: Galeri Laksamana Cheng Ho; Chinese: 郑和文物纪念廊; pinyin: Zhèng Hé wénwù jìniàn láng) is a gallery devoted to Zheng He in Malacca City, Malacca, Malaysia. It was opened in February 2003 and has been associated with the growth of tourism within the state. The gallery displays Zheng He's journey to Southeast Asia and his great legacy in international relations where he established the great affiliations between Ming Dynasty and African and Asian countries leading to prosperous and fair trade among them.

== See also ==
- List of museums in Malaysia
- List of tourist attractions in Malacca
- Cheng Ho Cultural Museum
