= Hang Kasturi Mausoleum =

Mausoleum in Central Melaka, Melaka, Malaysia

- Makam Hang Kasturi
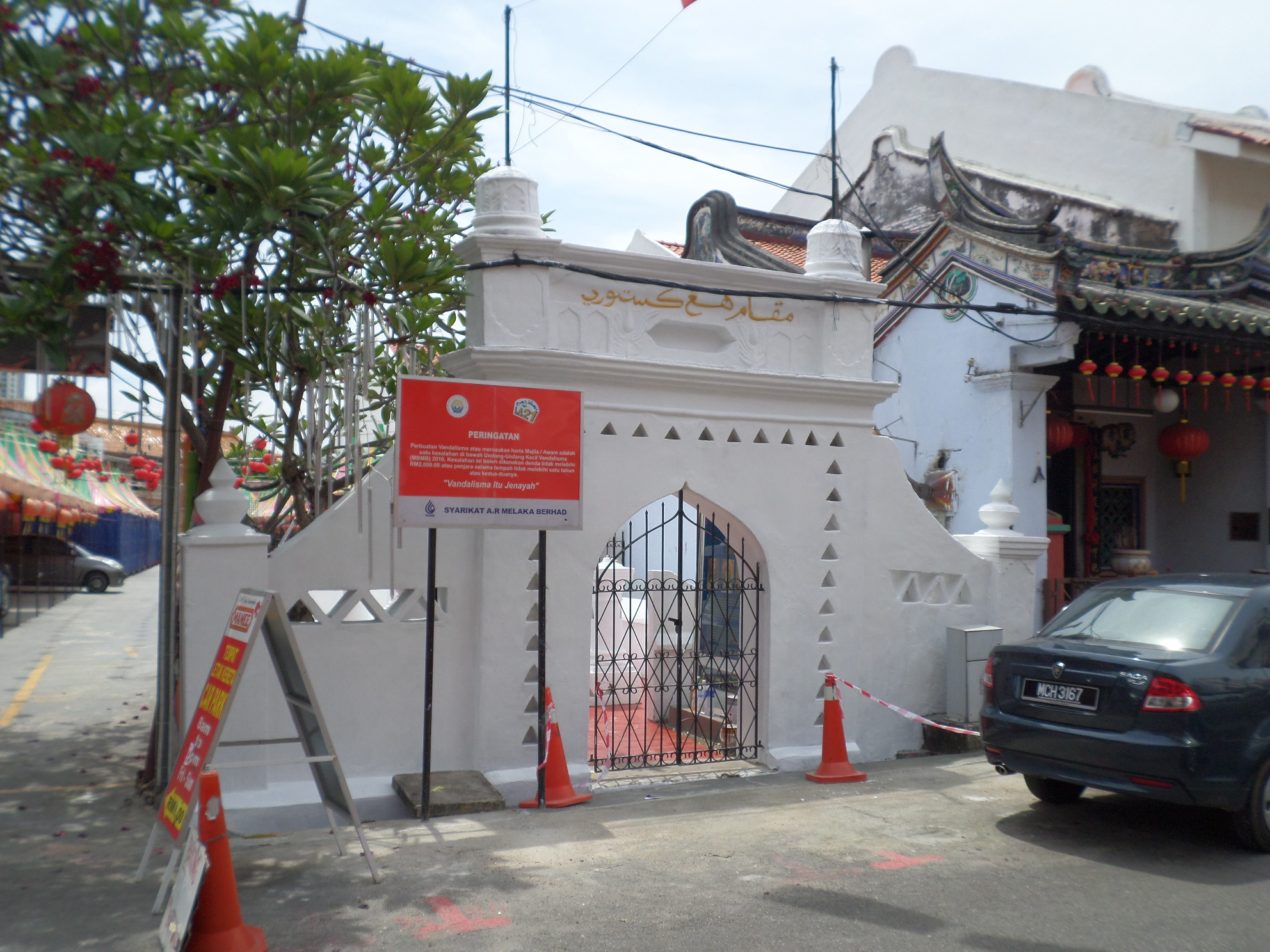
- Interactive map of Hang Kasturi Mausoleum

Details
- Location: Melaka City, Melaka, Malaysia
- Coordinates: 2°11′49.9″N 102°14′46.2″E
- Type: mausoleum
- Style: Indian

The Hang Kasturi Mausoleum (Malay: Makam Hang Kasturi) is the mausoleum of Hang Kasturi located in Jonker Walk, Melaka City, Melaka, Malaysia.

== Architecture ==
The mausoleum architecture is much influenced by the art and architecture from India.

== See also ==
- List of tourist attractions in Melaka
