= USS Cheng Ho =

1941 ship of the United States Navy

History

United States
- Name: USS Cheng Ho
- Namesake: Cheng Ho
- Builder: Ah King Shipways, Hong Kong
- Launched: October 1939
- Acquired: by purchase, 14 July 1941
- Commissioned: 23 July 1941
- Stricken: 25 February 1946
- Honors and awards: 1 battle star (Pearl Harbor)
- Fate: Beached for scrapping

General characteristics
- Type: Motor yacht
- Length: 90 ft (27 m)
- Beam: 30 ft (9.1 m)

USS Cheng Ho (IX-52) (also written Chengho), an unclassified miscellaneous vessel, was the only ship of the United States Navy of that name, which was given to her by her civilian owner for Zheng He, the Chinese admiral and explorer.

== Exploring vessel ==
The Chinese junk motor yacht was built especially for an expedition by botanist David Fairchild at the Ah King Shipways, Hong Kong, for Anne Mills Archbold (the daughter of John Dustin Archbold, co-founder of Standard Oil), and launched in October 1939. She was designed and built for a plant collecting expedition to the Dutch East Indies led by Fairchild, including a "modern" botanical laboratory below decks. The expedition was intended to last for two years, but after only six months the outbreak of war made further work impossible. Although shortened, the trip was productive. More than 500 different kinds of plants were collected, including more than 90 species of palms.

== Navy service ==
On 14 July 1941 the ship was bought by United States Navy from Mrs. Archbold for the nominal sum of one dollar, and placed in service on 23 July 1941, assigned to the 14th Naval District.

Cheng Ho was at the Section Base, Bishop's Point, during the Japanese attack on Pearl Harbor on 7 December 1941. Throughout World War II she served at Pearl Harbor as a picket boat, as an inshore patrol vessel and a naval officers' club. She was stricken on 25 February 1946, and turned over to the War Shipping Administration for return to her former owner.

Cheng Ho was last seen in 1990, derelict and beached at Papeete, Tahiti.
