= Zheng He =

Chinese admiral and diplomat (1371–1433/1435)

- 鄭和
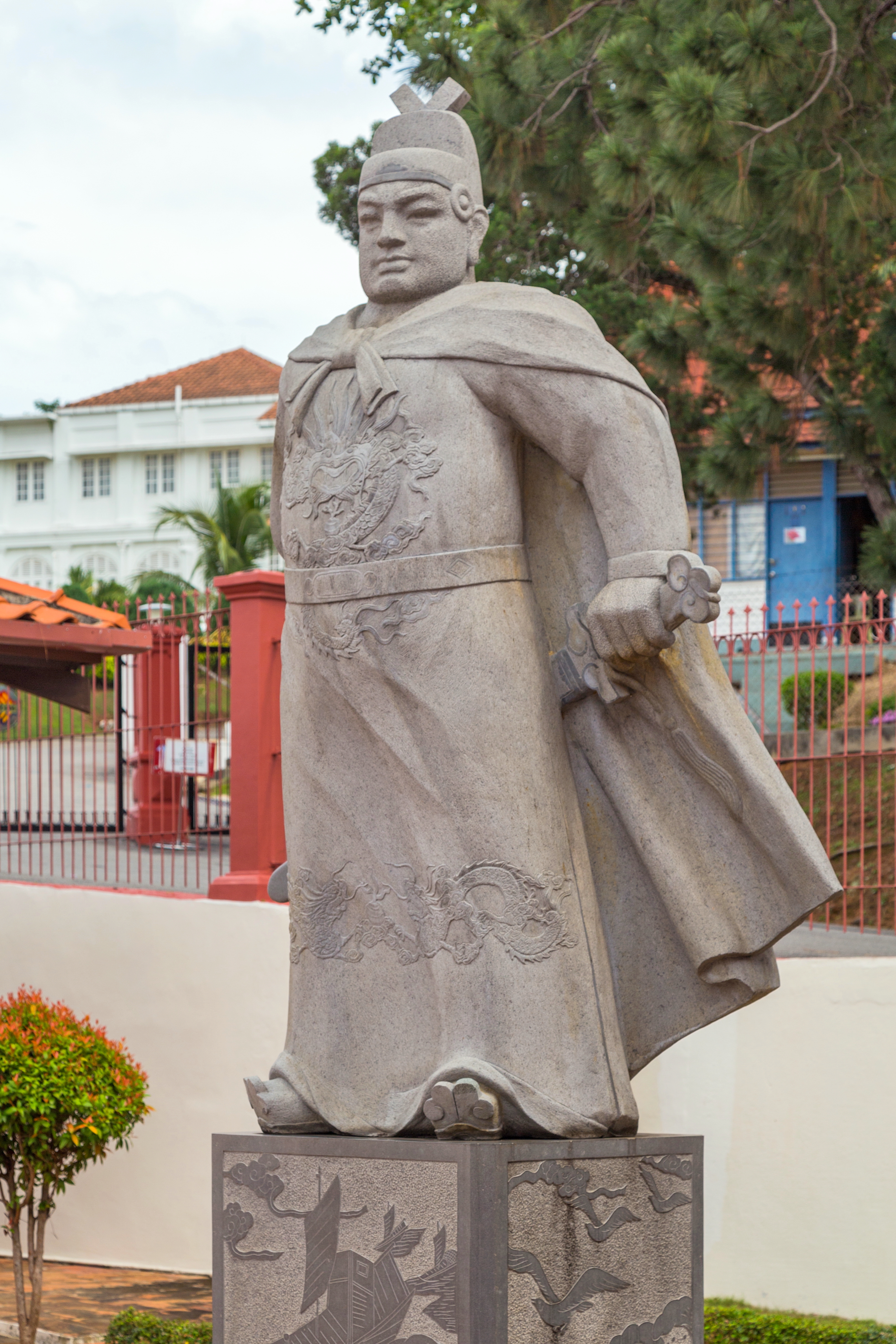
- Statue from a modern monument to Zheng He at the Stadthuys museum in Malacca City, Malaysia
- Born: Ma He; 1371; Kunming, Yunnan, Ming dynasty
- Died: 1433 (aged 61–62) or 1435 (aged 63–64)
- Other names: Ma He; Ma Sanbao; Cheng Ho; Mahmud Shams
- Occupations: Admiral, diplomat
- Era: Ming dynasty

Chinese name
- Traditional Chinese: 鄭和
- Simplified Chinese: 郑和
Transcriptions
Standard Mandarin
- Hanyu Pinyin: Zhèng Hé
- Wade–Giles: Chêng^{4} Ho^{2}
- Yale Romanization: Jèng Hé
- IPA: [ʈʂə̂ŋ xɤ̌]
Wu
- Romanization: Zen Wu
Yue: Cantonese
- Yale Romanization: Jehng Wòh
- Jyutping: Zeng6 Wo4
- IPA: [tsɛŋ˨ wɔ˩]
Southern Min
- Hokkien POJ: Tēⁿ Hô
- Tâi-lô: Tēnn Hô

Birth name
- Traditional Chinese: 馬和
- Simplified Chinese: 马和
Transcriptions
Standard Mandarin
- Hanyu Pinyin: Mǎ Hé

Zheng He (Wade-Giles: Chêng Ho; 1371–1433/1435) was a Chinese admiral and diplomat from the early Ming dynasty. His extensive explorations along the Indian Ocean led to a major increase in China's political and commercial influence. He was born into a Muslim family as Ma He (马和) and later adopted the surname Zheng conferred onto him by the Yongle Emperor (r. 1402–1424). He is also widely known in Chinese culture by the alias San Bao (三宝/三保), also spelled Sam Po, which in names of Southeast Asian temples can refer either to him or to the Three Jewels of Buddhism.

Between 1405 and 1433, Zheng commanded seven treasure voyages across Asia under the commission of the Yongle Emperor and the succeeding Xuande Emperor (r. 1425–1435). According to legend, Zheng's largest ships were almost twice as long as any wooden ship ever recorded, and carried hundreds of sailors on four decks. As emphasised by Tansen Sen, the powerful Ming navy brought a new militaristic presence to the Indian Ocean. It also encouraged state-controlled trade networks extending from China all the way to the Swahili coast of Africa.

A favorite of the Yongle Emperor, whom Zheng assisted in the Jingnan campaign that overthrew the previous Jianwen Emperor in 1402, Zheng He rose to the top of the Ming imperial hierarchy, and served as commander of the southern capital Nanjing.

== Early life and family ==
Zheng was born Ma He (马和) to a Muslim (Hui) family of Kunyang, Kunming, Yunnan, then under the rule of the Principality of Liang loyal to the Northern Yuan dynasty. He had an older brother and four sisters. The Liujiagang and Changle inscriptions suggest that devotion to Tianfei, the patron goddess of sailors and seafarers, was the dominant faith to which he adhered, reflecting the goddess's central role to the treasure fleet. John Guy mentions, "When Zheng He, the Muslim eunuch leader of the great expeditions to the 'Western Ocean' (Indian Ocean) in the early fifteenth century, embarked on his voyages, it was from the Divine Woman that he sought protection, as well as at the tombs of the Muslim saints on Lingshan Hill, above the city of Quanzhou."

Zheng He was a great-great-great-grandson of Sayyid Ajjal Shams al-Din Omar, who served in the administration of the Mongol Empire and was the governor of Yunnan during the early Yuan dynasty. His great-grandfather Bayan may have been stationed at a Mongol garrison in Yunnan. Zheng He's grandfather carried the title hajji, and his father had the sinicized surname Ma and the title hajji, which suggests that they had made the pilgrimage to Mecca.

In the autumn of 1382, a Ming army invaded and conquered Yunnan, which was then ruled by the Mongol prince Basalawarmi, Prince of Liang. In 1381, Ma Hajji, Zheng He's father, died in the fighting between the Ming armies and Mongol forces. Dreyer states that Zheng He's father died at 39 while resisting the Ming conquest, while Levathes states that Zheng He's father died at 37, but it is unclear if he was helping the Mongol Army or was just caught in the onslaught of battle. Wenming, the oldest son, buried their father outside Kunming. In his capacity as Admiral, Zheng He had an epitaph engraved in honour of his father, composed by the Minister of Rites Li Zhigang on 1 June 1405, which was Duanwu Festival.

== Capture and service ==
Zheng He was captured by the Ming armies in Yunnan in 1381. General Fu Youde saw Ma He on a road and approached him to inquire about the location of the Mongol pretender. Ma He responded defiantly by saying that the Mongol pretender had jumped into a lake. Then the general took him prisoner. He was castrated between the ages of 10 and 14, and placed in the service of the Prince of Yan.

Ma He was sent to serve in the household of Zhu Di, the Prince of Yan, who later became the Yongle Emperor. Zhu Di was 11 years older than Ma. Enslaved as a eunuch servant, Ma He eventually gained the confidence of Zhu Di, who, as his benefactor, gained the allegiance and loyalty of the young eunuch. The prince had been governing Beiping (modern Beijing) since 1380. It was near the northern frontier with hostile Mongol tribes. Ma spent his early life as a soldier on the northern frontier and often participated in Zhu Di's military campaigns against the Mongols. On 2 March 1390, Ma accompanied the prince when he commanded his first expedition, which was a great victory, as the Mongol commander Naghachu surrendered as soon as he realized he had fallen into a trap.

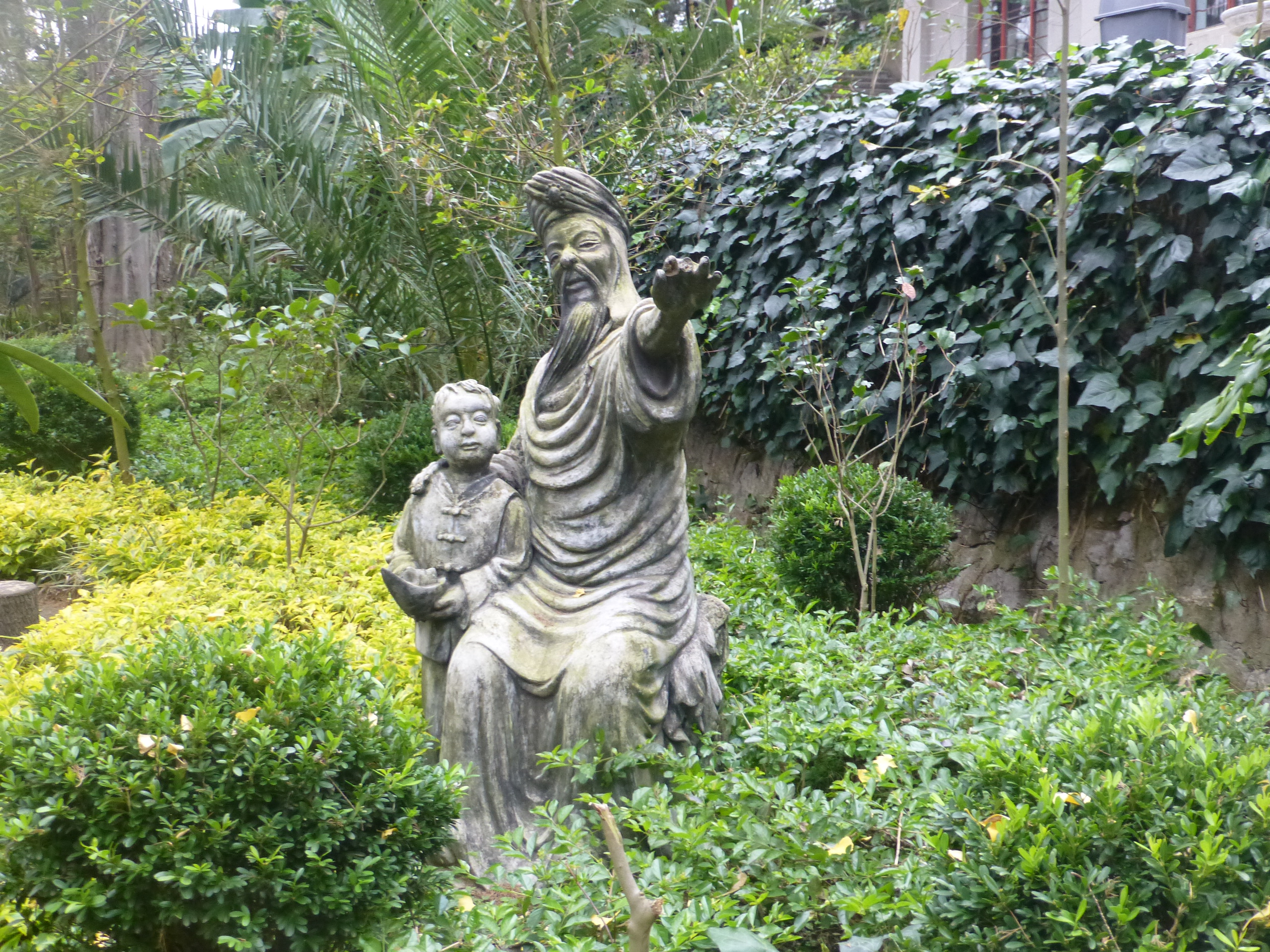
Sculpture in Zheng He Park, Kunyang, featuring a young Zheng He with his father Ma Hajji

Eventually, he gained the confidence and trust of the prince. Ma was also known as "Sanbao" during his service in the household of the Prince of Yan, a reference to the Buddhist Three Jewels. Ma received a proper education at Beiping, which he would not have had if he had been placed in the imperial capital of Nanjing as the Hongwu Emperor, the father of Zhu Di, did not trust eunuchs and believed that it was better to keep them illiterate. The Hongwu Emperor purged and exterminated much of the original Ming leadership and gave his enfeoffed sons more military authority, especially those in the north, like the Prince of Yan.

== Adulthood and military career ==
The power of the goddess, having indeed been manifested in previous times, has been abundantly revealed in the present generation. In the midst of the rushing waters it happened that, when there was a hurricane, suddenly a divine lantern was seen shining at the masthead, and as soon as that miraculous light appeared the danger was appeased, so that even in the peril of capsizing one felt reassured and that there was no cause for fear.

— Admiral Zheng He and his associates (Changle inscription) about witnessing Tianfei's divine lantern, which represented the natural phenomenon St. Elmo's fire

Zheng He's appearance as an adult was recorded: he was seven chi (Note: A chi is thought to vary between 26.5–30 cm / 10.5–12 inches) tall, had a waist that was five chi in circumference, cheeks and a forehead that was high, a small nose, glaring eyes, teeth that were white and well-shaped as shells, and a voice that was as loud as a bell. It is also recorded that he had great knowledge about warfare and was well-accustomed to battle.

The young eunuch eventually became a trusted adviser to the prince and assisted him when the Jianwen Emperor's hostility to his uncle's feudal bases prompted the 1399–1402 Jingnan Campaign, which ended with the emperor's apparent death and the ascension of Zhu Di, Prince of Yan, as the Yongle Emperor. In 1393, the Crown Prince had died, thus the deceased prince's son became the new heir apparent. By the time the emperor died (24 June 1398), the Prince of Qin and the Prince of Jin had perished, which left Zhu Di, the Prince of Yan, as the eldest surviving son of the emperor. However, Zhu Di's nephew succeeded the imperial throne as the Jianwen Emperor. In 1398, he issued a policy known as xuēfān (削藩), or "reducing the feudatories", which entailed eliminating all princes by stripping their power and military forces. In August 1399, Zhu Di openly rebelled against his nephew. In 1399, Ma He successfully defended Beiping's city reservoir, Zhenglunba, against the imperial armies. In January 1402, Zhu Di began with his military campaign to capture the imperial capital, Nanjing. Zheng He would be one of his commanders during that campaign.

In 1402, Zhu Di's armies defeated the imperial forces and marched into Nanjing on 13 July 1402. Zhu Di accepted the elevation to emperor four days later. After ascending the throne as the Yongle Emperor, Zhu Di promoted Ma He as the Grand Director (太監, tàijiān) of the Directorate of Palace Servants (内宫監). During the Chinese New Year on 11 February 1404, the Yongle Emperor conferred the surname "Zheng" to Ma He, because he had distinguished himself defending the city reservoir against imperial forces in 1399. Another reason was that the eunuch commander also distinguished himself during the 1402 campaign to capture the capital, Nanjing.

In the new administration, Zheng He served in the highest posts as Grand Director and later as Chief Envoy (正使; zhèngshǐ) during his sea voyages. Over the next three decades he conducted seven of the voyages on behalf of the emperor, trading and collecting tribute in the western Pacific and Indian Oceans.

In 1424, Zheng He traveled to Palembang in Sumatra to confer an official seal (Note: The Taizong Shilu 27 February 1424 entry reports that Zheng He was sent to deliver the seal because the old seal was destroyed in a fire. The Xuanzong Shilu 17 September 1425 entry reports that Zhang Funama delivered a seal, because the old seal was destroyed in a fire. The later Mingshi compilers seem to have combined the accounts, remarking that Shi Jisun's succession was approved in 1424 and that a new seal was delivered in 1425, suggesting that only one seal was destroyed by fire.) and letter of appointment upon Shi Jisun, who was placed in the office of Pacification Commissioner. The Taizong Shilu 27 February 1424 entry reports that Shi Jisun had sent Qiu Yancheng as envoy to petition the approval of the succession from his father Shi Jinqing, who was the Pacification Commissioner of Palembang, and was given permission from the Yongle Emperor. When Zheng He returned from Palembang, he found that the Yongle Emperor had died during his absence. On 7 September 1424, Zhu Gaozhi had inherited the throne as the Hongxi Emperor after the death of the Yongle Emperor on 12 August 1424.

On 7 September 1424, the Hongxi Emperor terminated the undertaking of further treasure voyages. On 24 February 1425, he appointed Zheng He as the defender of Nanjing and ordered him to continue his command over the treasure fleet for the city's defense. On 25 March 1428, the Xuande Emperor ordered Zheng He and others to take over the supervision for the rebuilding and repair of the Great Bao'en Temple at Nanjing. He completed the construction of the temple in 1431.

On 15 May 1426, the Xuande Emperor ordered the Directorate of Ceremonial to send a letter to Zheng He to reprimand him for a transgression. Earlier, an official (Note: Unnamed official who served as a Department Director under the Ministry of Works, who had departed for Nanjing to supervise the renovation of government buildings and to reward the skilled workers.) petitioned the emperor to reward workmen who had built temples in Nanjing. The Xuande Emperor responded negatively to the official for charging the costs to the court instead of the monks themselves, but he realised that Zheng He and his associates had instigated the official. According to Dreyer (2007), the nature of the emperor's words indicated that Zheng He's behaviour in the situation was the last straw, but there is too little information about what had happened earlier. Nevertheless, the Xuande Emperor would eventually come to trust Zheng He.

In 1430, the new Xuande Emperor appointed Zheng He to command over a seventh and final expedition into the "Western Ocean" (Indian Ocean). In 1431, Zheng He was bestowed with the title Sanbao Taijian (三寶太監), using his informal name Sanbao and the title of Grand Director.

== Expeditions ==
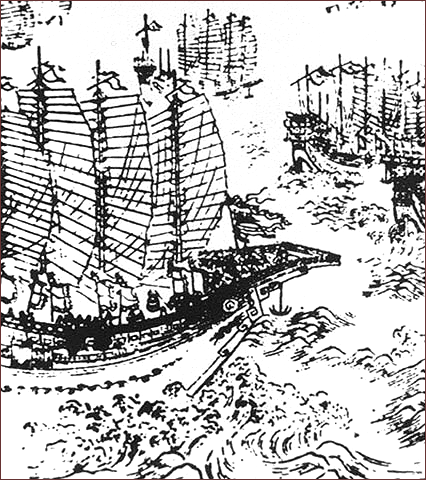
Early 17th-century Chinese woodblock print, thought to represent Zheng He's ships

The Yuan dynasty and the expanding Sino-Arab trade during the 14th century had gradually expanded Chinese knowledge of the world since "universal" maps previously displaying only China and its surrounding seas began to expand farther and farther southwest, with much more accurate depictions of the extent of Arabia and Africa. Between 1405 and 1433, the Ming government sponsored seven naval expeditions. The Yongle Emperor, disregarding the Hongwu Emperor's expressed wishes, designed them to establish a Chinese presence and impose imperial control over the Indian Ocean trade, impress foreign peoples in the Indian Ocean basin, and extend the empire's tributary system. It has also been inferred from passages in the History of Ming that the initial voyages were launched as part of the emperor's attempt to capture his escaped predecessor, which would have made the first voyage the "largest-scale manhunt on water in the history of China."

Zheng He was placed as the admiral in control of the huge fleet and armed forces that undertook the expeditions. Wang Jinghong was appointed as second in command. Preparations were thorough and wide-ranging, including the use of so many linguists that a foreign language institute was established at Nanjing. Zheng He's first voyage departed 11 July 1405, from Suzhou and consisted of a fleet of 317 ships holding almost 28,000 crewmen.

Zheng He's fleets visited Brunei, Java, Siam (Thailand), Southeast Asia, India, the Horn of Africa, and Arabia, dispensing and receiving goods along the way. Zheng He presented gifts of gold, silver, porcelain, and silk, and in return, China received such novelties as ostriches, zebras, camels, and ivory from the Swahili Coast. The giraffe that he brought back from Malindi was considered to be a qilin and taken as proof of the Mandate of Heaven upon the administration. The Daxuexi Alley Mosque in Xi'an has a stele dating to January 1523, inscribed with Zheng He's fourth maritime voyage to Tianfang, Arabian Peninsula.

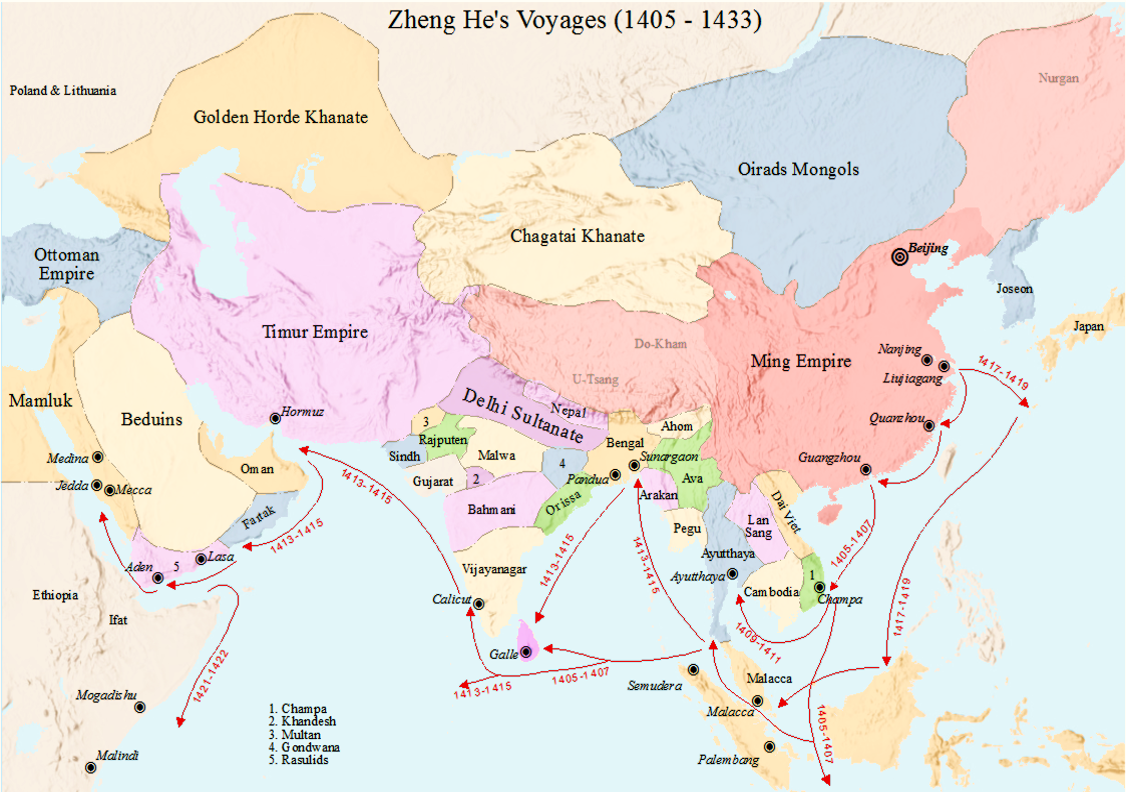
Voyages of Zheng He

While Zheng He's fleet was unprecedented, the routes were not. His fleet followed long-established, well-mapped routes of trade between China and the Arabian Peninsula that had been used since at least the Han dynasty. That fact, along with the use of a more-than-abundant number of crew members who were regular military personnel, leads some to speculate that the expeditions may have been geared at least partially at spreading China's power through expansion. During the Three Kingdoms Period, the king of Wu sent a 20-year diplomatic mission led by Zhu Ying and Kang Tai along the coast of Asia, which reached as far as the Eastern Roman Empire. After centuries of disruption, the Song dynasty restored large-scale maritime trade from China in the South Pacific and Indian Oceans and reached as far as the Arabian Peninsula and East Africa. When his fleet first arrived at Malacca, there was already a sizable Chinese community. The General Survey of the Ocean Shores (瀛涯勝覽, Yíngyá Shènglǎn), composed by the translator Ma Huan in 1416, gives very detailed accounts of his observations of people's customs and lives in the ports that they visited. He referred to the expatriate Chinese as "Tang" people (唐人; Tángrén).

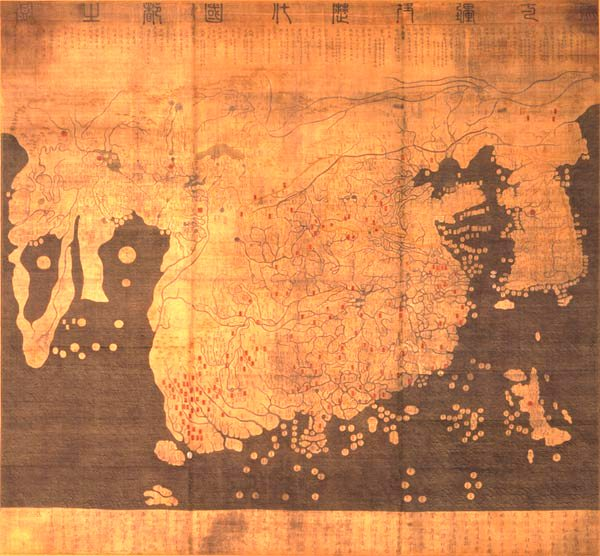
The Kangnido map (1402) predates Zheng's voyages and suggests that he had quite detailed geographical information on much of East Asia and moderate information on the rest of the Old World.

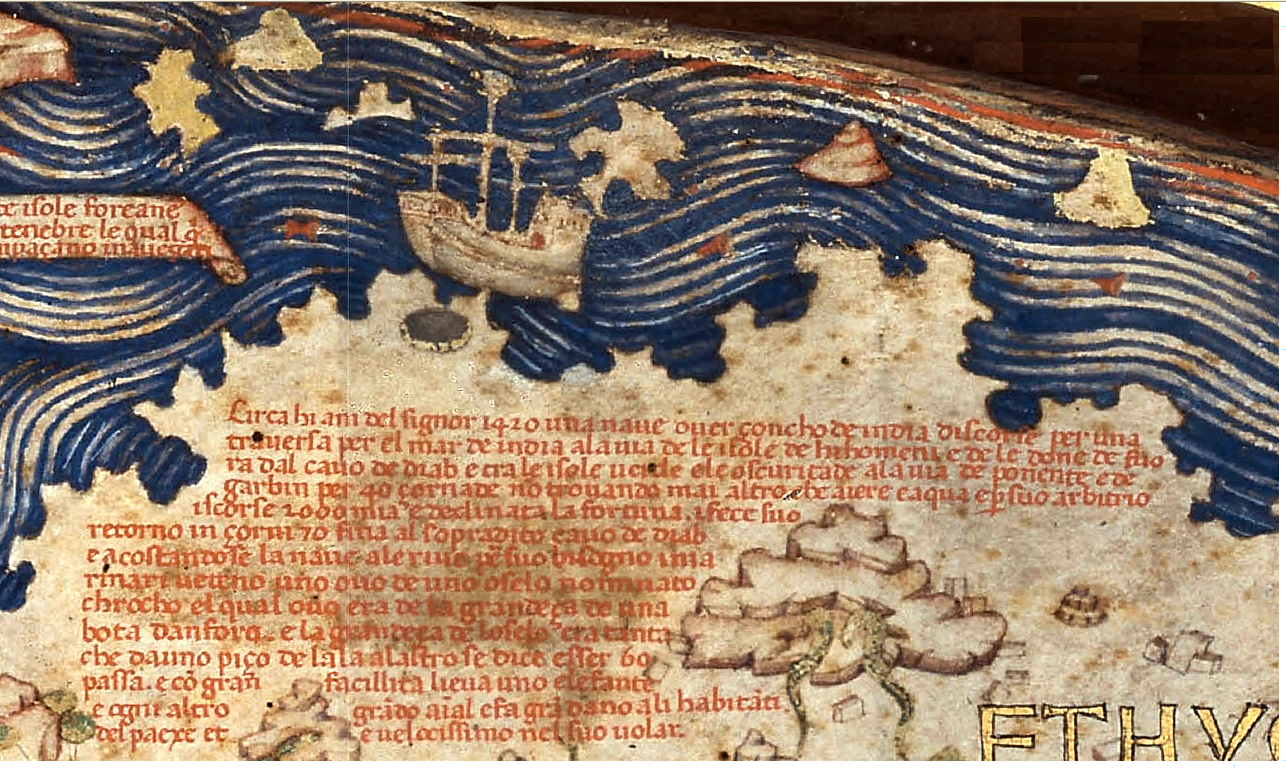
Detail of the Fra Mauro map relating the travels of a junk into the Atlantic Ocean in 1420. The ship also is illustrated above the text.

The fleet included troops, their purpose was to demonstrate the Middle Kingdom's strength. However, a contemporary reported that Zheng He "walked like a tiger" and did not shrink from violence when he considered it necessary to impress foreign peoples with China's military might. He ruthlessly suppressed pirates, who had long plagued Chinese and Southeast Asian waters. For example, he defeated Chen Zuyi, one of the most feared and respected pirate captains, and returned him to China for execution. After this, the Ming established Old Port Pacification Superintendency at Palembang, appointing prominent local Shi Jinqing as its superintendent. He later waged a land war against the Kingdom of Kotte on Ceylon, and he made displays of military force when local officials threatened his fleet in Arabia and East Africa. From his fourth voyage, he brought envoys from 30 states, who traveled to China and paid their respects at the Ming court.

In 1424, the Yongle Emperor died. His successor, the Hongxi Emperor (r. 1424–1425), stopped the voyages during his short reign. Zheng He made one more voyage during the reign of Hongxi's son, the Xuande Emperor (r. 1426–1435) but, the voyages of the Chinese treasure ship fleets then ended. Xuande believed his father's decision to halt the voyages had been meritorious and thus "there would be no need to make a detailed description of his grandfather's sending Zheng He to the Western Ocean." The voyages "were contrary to the rules stipulated in the Huang Ming Zuxun" (皇明祖訓), the dynastic foundation documents laid down by the Hongwu Emperor:

Some far-off countries pay their tribute to me at much expense and through great difficulties, all of which are by no means my own wish. Messages should be forwarded to them to reduce their tribute so as to avoid high and unnecessary expenses on both sides.

They further violated longstanding Confucian principles. They were only made possible by (and therefore continued to represent) a triumph of the Ming's eunuch faction over the administration's scholar-bureaucrats. Upon Zheng He's death and his faction's fall from power, his successors sought to minimize him in official accounts, along with continuing attempts to destroy all records related to the Jianwen Emperor or the manhunt to find him.

Although unmentioned in the official dynastic histories, Zheng He probably died during the treasure fleet's last voyage. Although he has a tomb in China, it is empty since he was buried at sea.

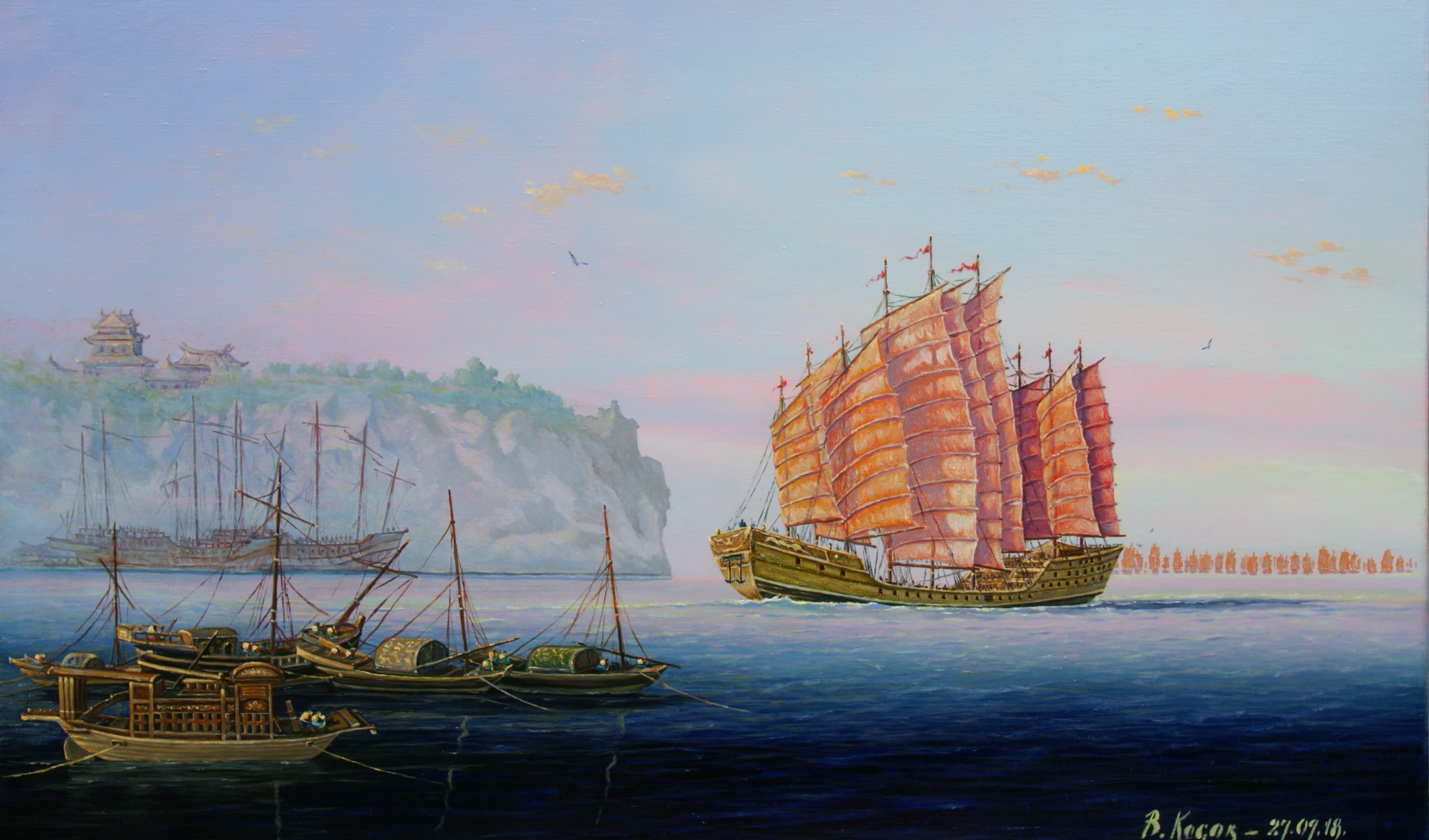
Artist's illustration of Zheng He's fleet

Zheng He led seven expeditions to the "Western" or Indian Ocean. Zheng He brought back to China many trophies and envoys from more than thirty kingdoms, including King Vira Alakeshwara of Ceylon, who came to China as a captive to apologize to the Emperor for offenses against his mission.

Zheng He wrote of his travels:

We have traversed more than 100,000 li of immense water spaces and have beheld in the ocean huge waves like mountains rising in the sky, and we have set eyes on barbarian regions far away hidden in a blue transparency of light vapors, while our sails, loftily unfurled like clouds day and night, continued their course [as rapidly] as a star, traversing those savage waves as if we were treading a public thoroughfare....

== Sailing charts ==
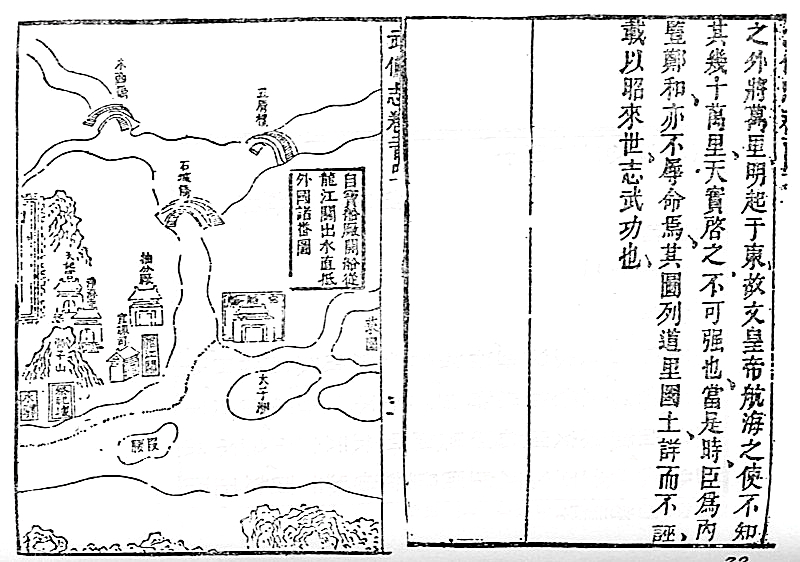
One of a set of maps of Zheng He's missions (郑和航海图), also known as the Mao Kun map, 1628

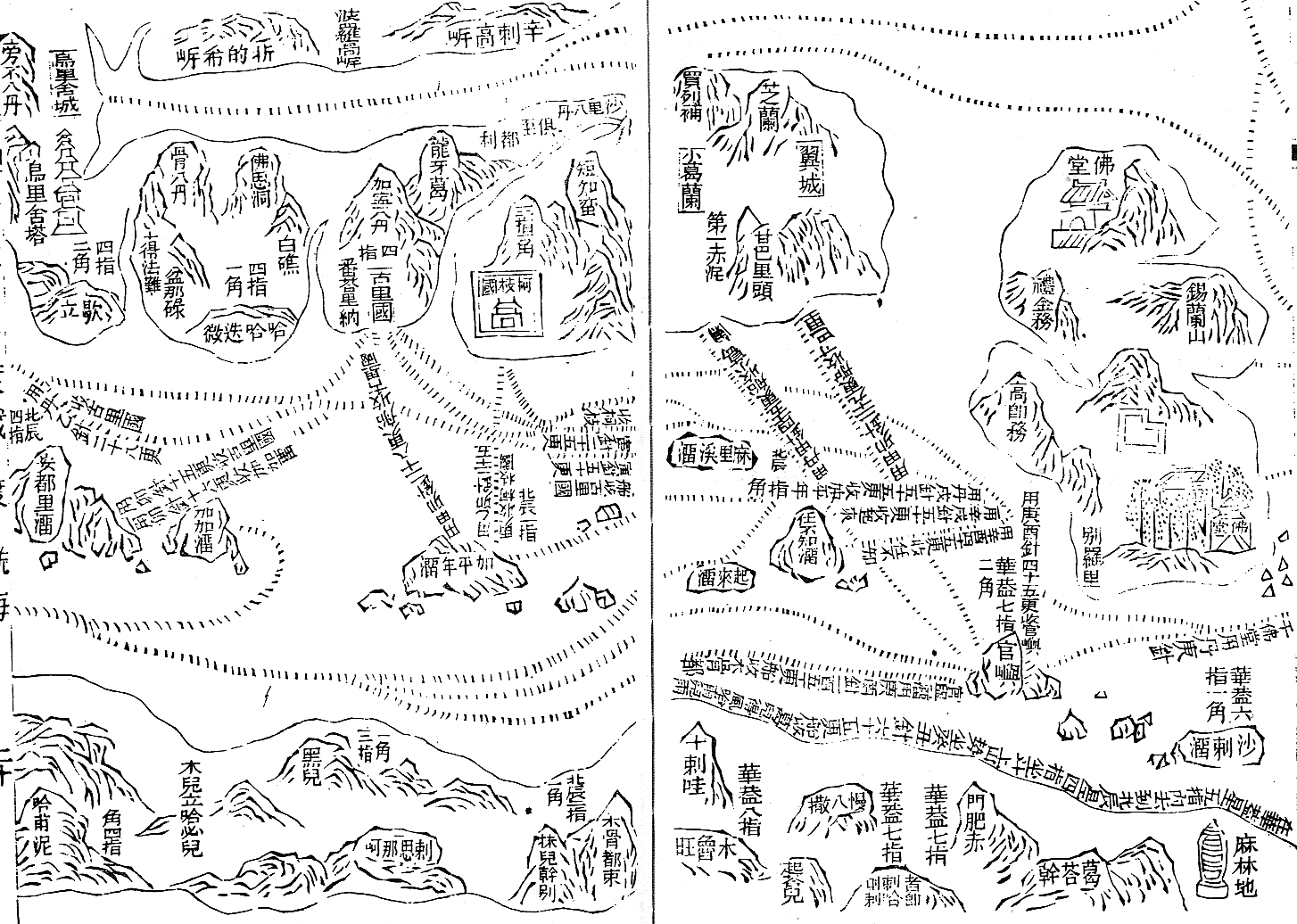
A section of the Wubei Zhi oriented east: India in the upper left, Sri Lanka upper right, and Africa along the bottom.

Zheng He's sailing charts, the Mao Kun map, were published in a book entitled the Wubei Zhi (A Treatise on Armament Technology) written in 1621 and published in 1628 but traced back to Zheng He's and earlier voyages. It was originally a strip map 20.5 cm by 560 cm that could be rolled up, but was divided into 40 pages which vary in scale from 7 miles/inch in the Nanjing area to 215 miles/inch in parts of the African coast.

Investigation into folios 19V to 20R of the Mao Kun Map, which cover the Indian Ocean including South India, Sri Lanka, the Maldives, and East Africa, suggests that the map is a composite of four maps, one for Sri Lanka, one for South India, one for the Maldives and one for around 400 km of the East African coast, no further south than 6 degrees south of the Equator. Each of these maps is positioned at a different orientation to fit with the ocean currents and winds required of a sailing chart, rather than a formal map. The analysis also suggests that Arabic-speaking pilots with a detailed knowledge of the African coast were involved in the cartography.

There is little attempt to provide an accurate 2-D representation; instead, the sailing instructions are given using a 24-point compass system with a Chinese symbol for each point, together with a sailing time or distance, which takes account of the local currents and winds. Sometimes depth soundings are also provided. It also shows bays, estuaries, capes and islands, ports and mountains along the coast, important landmarks such as pagodas and temples, and shoal rocks. Of 300 named places outside China, more than 80% can be confidently located. There are also fifty observations of stellar altitude.

== Size of ships ==
According to Luo Maodeng's novel Sanbao taijian xia Xiyang ji tongsu yanyi (Popular Romance of the Record of the Three-Jeweled Eunich Descending upon the Western Sea, published 1597), the first expedition had:

- "Treasure ships" (宝船, Bǎo Chuán) nine-masted, 44.4 by 18 zhang, about 127 metres (417 feet) long and 52 metres (171 feet) wide.
- Equine ships (馬船, Mǎ Chuán), carrying horses and tribute goods and repair material for the fleet, eight-masted, 37 by 15 zhang, about 103 m (338 ft) long and 42 m (138 ft) wide.
- Supply ships (粮船, Liáng Chuán), containing staple for the crew, seven-masted, 28 by 12 zhang, about 78 m (256 ft) long and 35 m (115 ft) wide.
- Transport ships (坐船, Zuò Chuán), six-masted, 24 by 9.4 zhang, about 67 m (220 ft) long and 25 m (82 ft) wide.
- Warships (战船, Zhàn Chuán), five-masted, 18 by 6.8 zhang, about 50 m (160 ft) long.

On the ships were navigators, explorers, sailors, doctors, workers, and soldiers, along with the translator and diarist Gong Zhen. Six more expeditions took place from 1407 to 1433, with fleets thought to be of comparable size.

Marco Polo and Ibn Battuta both described multi-masted ships carrying 500 to 1,000 passengers in their translated accounts. Niccolò de' Conti, a contemporary of Zheng He, was also an eyewitness of ships in Southeast Asia, claiming to have seen five-masted junks weighing about 2,000 vegetes, that is Venetian butt. Christopher Wake estimated a burthen of 1,300 tons. The ship of Conti may have been a Burmese or Indonesian jong.

The largest ships in the fleet, the Chinese treasure ships described in Chinese chronicles, would have been nearly twice as long as any other wooden ship recorded thereafter until the 20th century, surpassing Admiral Horatio Nelson's HMS Victory, 69.34 metres (227 ft 6 in) long, which was launched in 1765, and the 68.88-metre (226 ft) Vasa of 1627. The first ships to attain 126 m (413 ft) long were 19th century steamers with iron hulls. Many scholars consider it unlikely that any of Zheng He's ships were 135 m (450 ft) in length and have proposed much shorter lengths, as low as 60–75 m (200–250 ft). Zhao Zhigang claimed that he has solved the debate of the size difference, and stated that Zheng He's largest ship was about 70 m (230 ft) in length.

=== Disputes of historical records of length ===
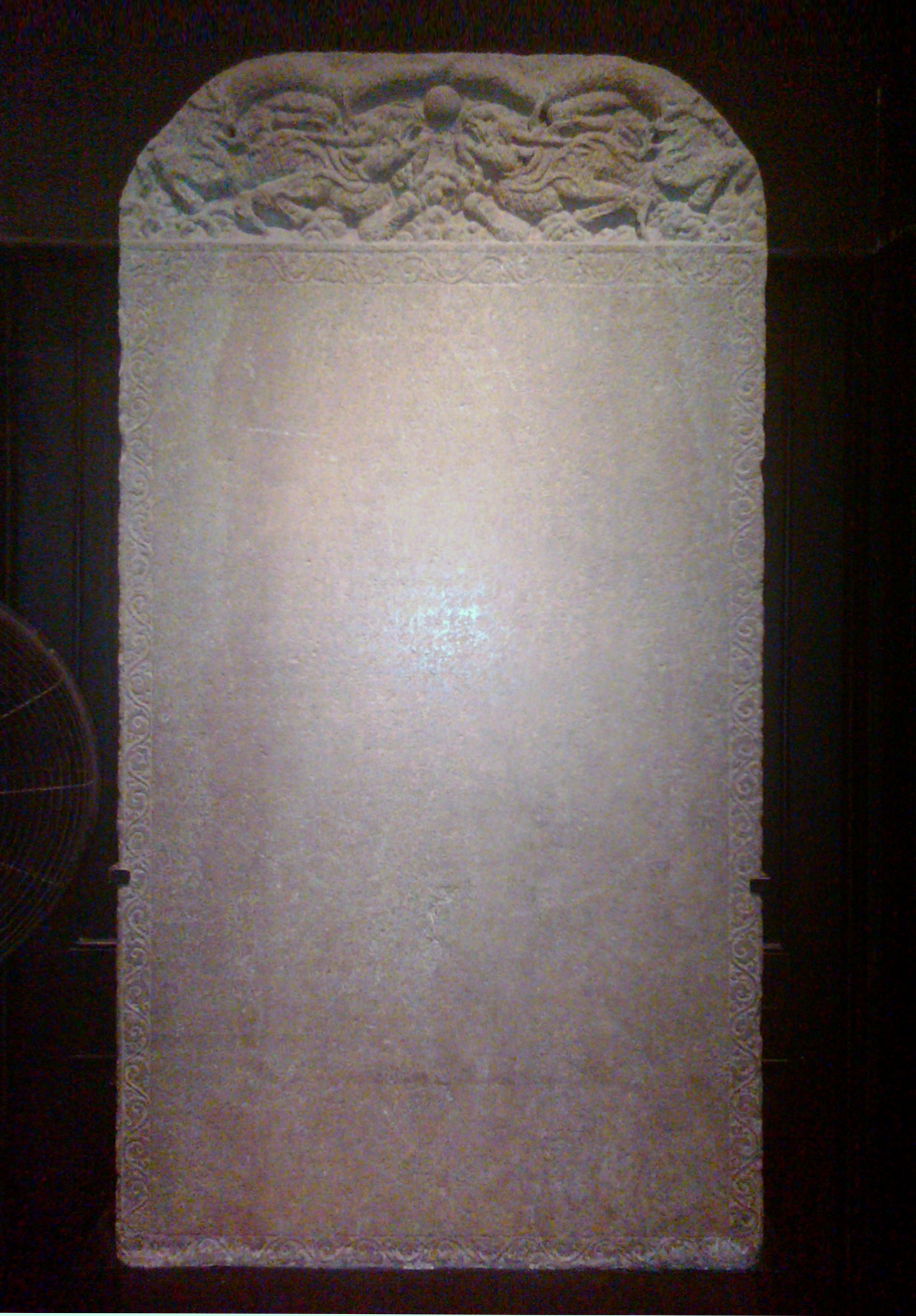
Galle Trilingual Inscription, left by Zheng He in Sri Lanka in 1409

Edward L. Dreyer writes that Luo Maodeng's novel Sanbao taijian xia Xiyang ji tongsu yanyi is unsuitable as historical evidence. The novel contains a number of fantasy elements; for example the ships were "constructed with divine help by the immortal Lu Ban".

One explanation for the seemingly-inefficient size of the colossal ships was that the 44 zhang treasure ships were used only by the Emperor and imperial bureaucrats to travel along the Yangtze for court business, including reviewing Zheng He's expedition fleet. The Yangtze river, with its calmer waters, may have been navigable by these treasure ships. Zheng He, a court eunuch, would not have had the privilege in rank to command the largest of the ships, seaworthy or not. The main ships of Zheng He's fleet were instead six-masted 2,000-liao ships. That would give burthen of 500 tons and a displacement tonnage of about 800 tons.

Traditional and popular accounts of Zheng He's voyages have described a great fleet of gigantic ships far larger than any other wooden ships in history. The most grandiose claims for Zheng He's 1405 fleet are entirely based on a calculation derived from an account that was written three centuries later and was accepted as fact by one modern writer; rejected by numerous naval experts. There are even some sources that claim some of the treasure ships might have been as long as 183 m (600 ft). The claims that the Chinese treasure ships reached such size is disputed because other 17th century Ming records stated that European East Indiamen and galleons were 30, 40, 50, and 60 zhang (90, 120, 150, and 180 m) in length.

It is also possible that the measure of zhang (丈) used in the conversions was mistaken. The length of a Dutch ship recorded in the History of Ming was 30 zhang. If the zhang is taken to be 3.2 m, the Dutch ship would be 96 m long. Also the Dutch Hongyi cannon was recorded to be more than 2 zhang (6.4 m) long. Comparative study by Hu Xiaowei (2018) concluded that 1 zhang would be equal to 1.5–1.6 m, this means the Dutch ship would be 45–48 m long and the cannon would be 3–3.2 m long. Taking 1.6 m for 1 zhang, Zheng He's 44 zhang treasure ship would be 70.4 m (230.97 ft) long and 28.8 m (94.49 ft) wide, or 22 zhang long and 9 zhang wide if the zhang is taken to be 3.2 m. It is known that the measure unit during the Ming era was not unified: A measurement of East and West Pagoda in Quanzhou resulted in a zhang unit of 2.5–2.56 m. According to Chen Cunren, one zhang in the Ming Dynasty is only half a zhang in modern times.

=== Treasure Shipyard excavation ===
From 2003 to 2004, the Treasure Shipyard was excavated in northwestern Nanjing (the former capital of the Ming Dynasty), near the Yangtze River. Despite the site being referred to as the "Longjiang Treasure Shipyard" (龍江寶船廠) in the official names, the site is distinct from the actual Longjiang Shipyard, which was located on a different site and produced different types of ships. The Treasure Shipyard, where Zheng He's fleet is believed to have been built in the Ming Dynasty, once consisted of thirteen basins (based on a 1944 map), most of which have now been covered by the construction of buildings in the 20th century. The basins are believed to have been connected to the Yangtze via a series of gates. Three long basins survive, each with wooden structures inside, interpreted to be frames onto which the ships to be built on. The largest basin extends for a length of 421 metres (1,381 ft). While they were long enough to accommodate the largest claimed Zheng He treasure ship, they were not wide enough to fit even a ship half the claimed size. The basin was only 41 metres (135 ft) wide at most, with only a 10 metres (33 ft) width showing evidence of structures. They were also not deep enough, being only 4 metres (13 ft) deep. Other remains of ships in the site indicate that the ships were only slightly larger than the frames that supported them. Moreover, the basin structures were grouped into clusters with large gaps between them, if each cluster was interpreted as a ship framework, then the largest ship would not exceed 75 metres (246 ft) at most, probably less.

The 2003–2004 excavation also recovered two complete wooden rudderposts from the Treasure Shipyard, in addition to another recovered in 1957. They are made of teak and measure around 10 to 11 metres (33 to 36 ft) in length. Zhou Shide (1962) claimed that the first rudderpost recovered was proof of the enormous dimensions of the ships based on his calculations on how big the rudderblade would be. However Church (2010) points out that Zhou was using calculations based on modern steel propeller-driven ships, not wooden ships; as well as the fact that Zhou's hypothetical rudder shape was based on the flat-bottomed shachuan (沙船) ship type, not the sea-going fuchuan (福船). The rudderposts cannot be used to infer the actual size of the rudder blades. Church notes that in traditional wooden Chinese ships, rudderposts were necessarily long in order for them to extend from the water level up unto the ship deck, where it was controlled by the tiller. Church compares it with modern wooden junks built in the traditional Lümeimao ("green eyebrow", 綠眉毛) style, which also have rudderposts that are 11 metres (36 ft) long, but are only 31 metres (102 ft) in overall length.

== Death ==
One theory is that Admiral Zheng He died in 1433, during (probably in Calicut), or shortly after his seventh voyage. Another is that Zheng He continued to serve as the defender of Nanjing, and died in 1435.

A tomb was built for Zheng He at the southern slope of Cattle Head Hill, Nanjing. The original tomb was a horseshoe-shaped grave. It is a cenotaph believed to contain his clothes and headgear. In 1985, the tomb was rebuilt following the Muslim style.

== Legacy ==
Zheng's voyages were long neglected in official Chinese histories but have become well known in China and abroad since the publication of Liang Qichao's Biography of Our Homeland's Great Navigator, Zheng He in 1904.

=== Imperial China ===
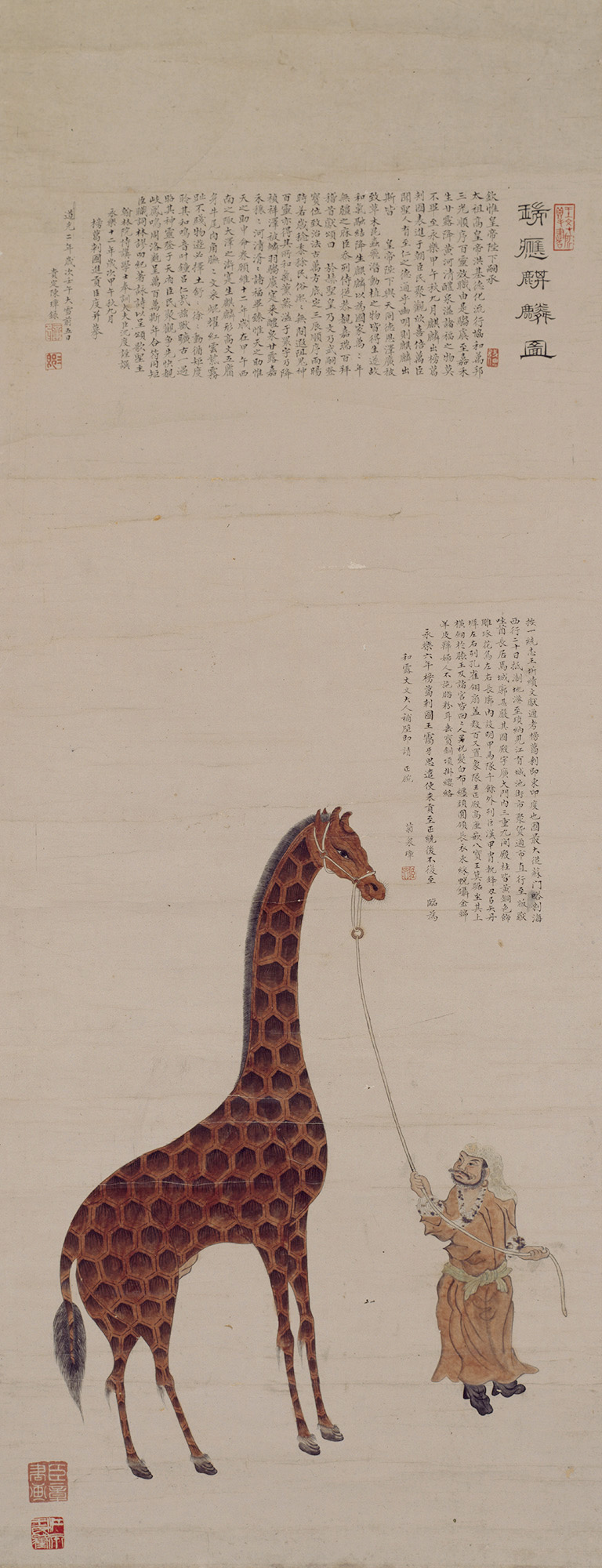
The pet giraffe of the Sultan of Bengal, brought from the Somali Ajuran Empire, and later taken to China in the thirteenth year of Yongle (1415).

In the decades after the last voyage, Imperial officials minimized the importance of Zheng He and his expeditions throughout the many regnal and dynastic histories they compiled. The information in the Yongle and Xuande Emperors' official annals was incomplete and even erroneous, and other official publications omitted them completely. Although some have seen that as a conspiracy seeking to eliminate memories of the voyages, it is likely that the records were dispersed throughout several departments and the expeditions, unauthorized by and in fact counter to the injunctions of the dynastic founder, presented a kind of embarrassment to the dynasty.

State-sponsored Ming naval efforts declined dramatically after Zheng's voyages. Starting in the early 15th century, China experienced increasing pressure from the surviving Yuan Mongols from the north. The relocation of the capital to Beijing in the north exacerbated this threat dramatically. At considerable expense, China launched annual military expeditions from Beijing to weaken the Mongolians. The expenditures necessary for the land campaigns directly competed with the funds necessary to continue naval expeditions. Further, in 1449, Mongolian cavalry ambushed a land expedition personally led by the Zhengtong Emperor at Tumu Fortress, less than a day's march from the walls of the capital. The Mongolians wiped out the Chinese army and captured the emperor. The battle had two salient effects. Firstly, it demonstrated the clear threat posed by the northern nomads. Secondly, the Mongols caused a political crisis in China when they released the emperor after his half-brother had already ascended and declared the new Jingtai era. Not until 1457 and the restoration of the former emperor would political stability return. Upon his return to power, China abandoned the strategy of annual land expeditions and instead embarked upon a massive and expensive expansion of the Great Wall of China. In that environment, funding for naval expeditions was simply absent.

However, missions from Southeastern Asia continued to arrive for decades. Depending on local conditions, they could reach such frequency that the court found it necessary to restrict them. The History of Ming records imperial edicts forbade Java, Champa, and Siam from sending their envoys more often than once every three years.

=== Southeast Asia ===
==== Veneration ====
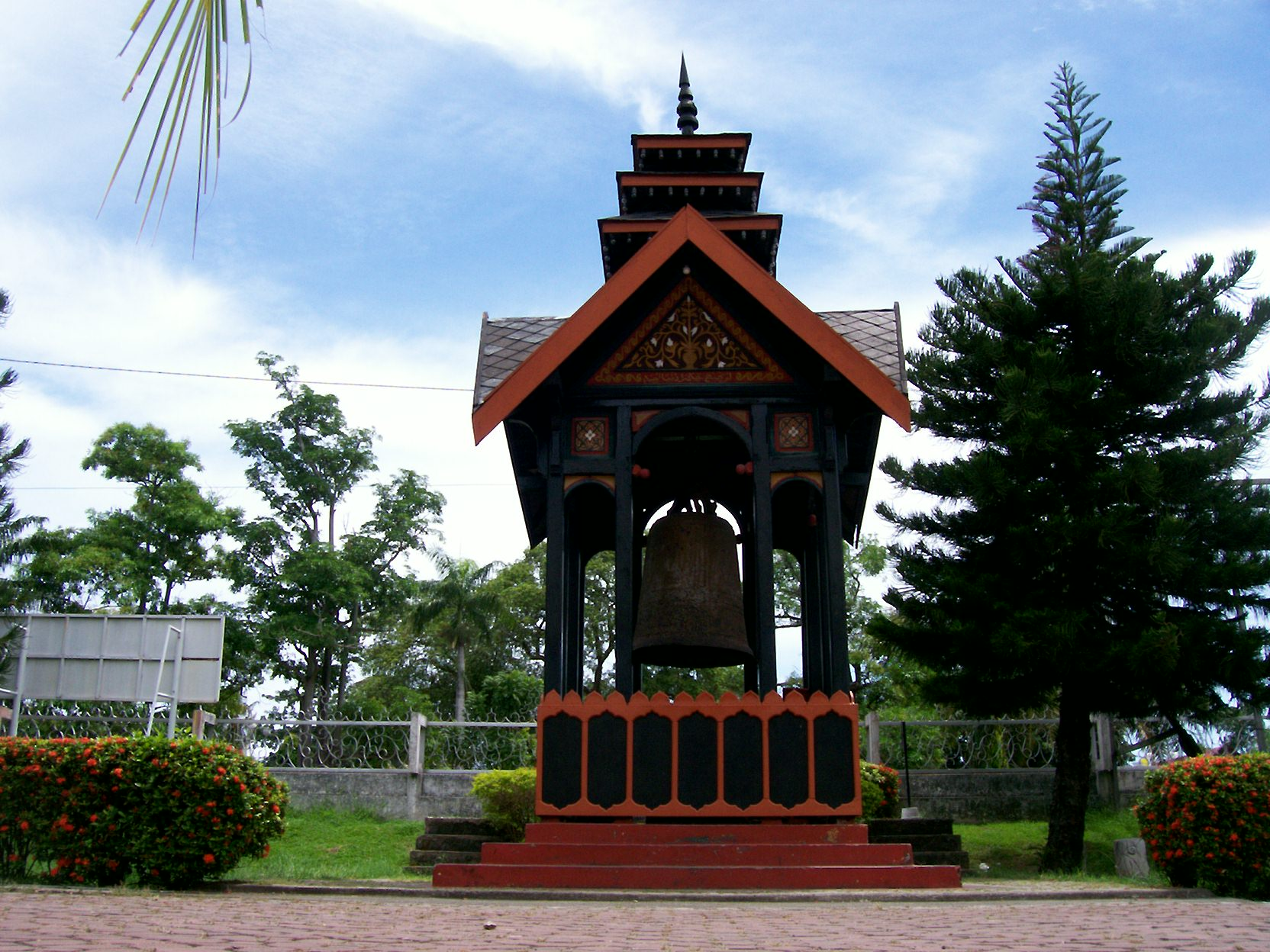
The Cakra Donya Bell, a gift from Zheng He to Pasai, now kept at the Aceh Museum in Banda Aceh.

Among the Chinese diaspora in Southeast Asia, Zheng He became a figure of folk veneration. Even some of his crew members who happened to stay in some port sometimes did so as well, such as "Poontaokong" on Sulu. The temples of the cult, sometimes named using his alias Sam Po, are peculiar to overseas Chinese except for a single temple in Hongjian originally constructed by a returned Filipino Chinese in the Ming dynasty and rebuilt by another Filipino Chinese after the original was destroyed during the Cultural Revolution.

==== Malacca ====
The oldest and most important Chinese temple in Malacca is the 17th-century Cheng Hoon Teng, dedicated to Guanyin. During Dutch colonial rule, the head of the Cheng Hoon Temple was appointed as chief over the community's Chinese inhabitants.

Following Zheng He's arrival, the sultan and the sultana of Malacca visited China at the head of over 540 of their subjects, bearing ample tribute. Sultan Mansur Shah (r. 1459–1477) later dispatched Tun Perpatih Putih as his envoy to China, carrying a letter from the sultan to the Ming emperor. The letter requested the hand of an imperial daughter in marriage. Malay (but not Chinese) annals record that in 1459, a princess named Hang Li Po or Hang Liu was sent from China to marry the sultan. She came with 500 high-ranking young men and a few hundred handmaidens as her entourage. They eventually settled in Bukit Cina. It is believed that a significant number of them married into the local populace, creating the descendants now known as the Peranakan. Owing to this supposed lineage, the Peranakan still use special honorifics: Baba for the men and Nyonya for the women.

==== Indonesia ====
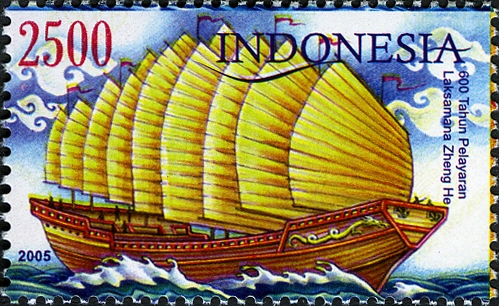
Stamp from Indonesia commemorating Zheng He's voyages to secure the maritime routes, usher urbanisation and assist in creating a common prosperity throughout continents and cultures.

The Zheng Hoo Mosque in Surabaya.

The Chinese Indonesian community have established temples dedicated to Zheng He in Jakarta, Cirebon, Surabaya, and Semarang.

In 1961, the Indonesian Islamic leader and scholar Hamka credited Zheng He for playing an important role in the development of Islam in Indonesia. The Brunei Times credits Zheng He with building Chinese Muslim communities in Palembang and along the shores of Java, the Malay Peninsula, and the Philippines. These Muslims allegedly followed the Hanafi school in the Chinese language.

=== West Asia ===
There is a monument to Zheng He in Salalah, Oman.

=== Western scholarship ===
In the 1950s, historians such as John Fairbank and Joseph Needham popularized the idea that after Zheng He's voyages China turned away from the seas due to the Haijin edict and was isolated from European technological advancements. Modern historians point out that Chinese maritime commerce did not totally stop after Zheng He, that Chinese ships continued to participate in Southeast Asian commerce until the 19th century, and that active Chinese trading with India and East Africa continued long after the time of Zheng. Moreover, revisionist historians such as Jack Goldstone argue that the Zheng He voyages ended for practical reasons that did not reflect the technological level of China. Although the Ming dynasty prohibited shipping with the Haijin edict, it was a policy of the Hongwu Emperor that long preceded Zheng He and the ban, so obviously disregarded by the Yongle Emperor, was eventually lifted entirely. However, the ban on maritime shipping forced countless numbers of people into smuggling and piracy. Neglect of the imperial navy and Nanjing dockyards after Zheng He's voyages left the coast highly vulnerable to Japanese wokou during the 16th century.

Richard von Glahn, a UCLA professor of Chinese history, commented that most treatments of Zheng He present him wrongly, "offer counterfactual arguments," and "emphasize China's missed opportunity" by focusing on failures, instead of accomplishments. In contrast, Glahn asserts that "Zheng He reshaped Asia" because maritime history in the 15th century was essentially the Zheng He story and the effects of his voyages.

=== Cultural influence ===
Despite the official neglect, the adventures of the fleet captured the imagination of some Chinese with some writing novelisations of the voyages, such as Sanbao taijian xia Xiyang ji tongsu yanyi in 1597.

On his travels, Zheng He built mosques and also spread the worship of Mazu. He apparently never found time for a pilgrimage to Mecca but sent sailors there on his last voyage. He played an important part in developing relations between China and Islamic countries. Zheng He also visited Muslim shrines of Islamic holy men in the Fujian.

In modern times, interest in Zheng He has revived substantially. In Vernor Vinge's 1999 science fiction novel A Deepness in the Sky, an interstellar society of commercial traders in human space are named the Qeng Ho, after the admiral. The expeditions featured prominently in Heather Terrell's 2005 novel The Map Thief. For the 600th anniversary of Zheng He's voyages in 2005, China Central Television produced a special television series, Zheng He Xia Xiyang, starring Gallen Lo as Zheng He. He is also mentioned in part of the main storyline of the first-person shooter game Far Cry 3. The Star Trek series Picard further featured an advanced starship named USS Zheng He. There was even a US Navy boat that was acquired for picket duty during World War II that was named Cheng Ho by its previous owner.

=== Relics ===
- Zheng He built the Tianfei Palace (天妃宫; Tiānfēigōng; 'Palace of the Tianfei Goddess'), a temple in honour of the goddess Mazu, in Nanjing after the fleet returned from its first western voyage in 1407.
- The "Deed of Foreign Connection and Exchange" (通番事跡) or "Tongfan Deed Stele" is located in the Tianfei Palace in Liuhe, Taicang, whence the expeditions first departed. The stele was submerged and lost but has been rebuilt.
- To thank the Tianfei for her blessings, Zheng He and his colleagues rebuilt the Tianfei Palace in Nanshan, Changle County, Fujian Province as well before they left on their last voyage. At the renovated temple, they raised a stele, "A Record of Tianfei Showing Her Presence and Power" (天妃靈應之記; Tiānfēi Líng Yīng zhī Jì), discussing their earlier voyages.
- The Galle Trilingual Inscription in Sri Lanka was discovered in the city of Galle in 1911 and is preserved at the National Museum of Colombo. The three languages used in the inscription were Chinese, Tamil, and Persian. The inscription praises Buddha and describes the fleet's donations to the famous Tenavarai Nayanar temple of Tondeswaram frequented by both Hindus and Buddhists.
- Zheng He's tomb in Nanjing has been repaired and a small museum built next to it, but his body was buried at sea off the Malabar Coast near Calicut, in western India. However, his sword and other personal possessions were interred in a Muslim tomb inscribed in Arabic. The tomb of Zheng He's assistant Hong Bao was recently unearthed in Nanjing as well.
- Seven large sunken ships were found in the sea near Dongsha Island, which were confirmed to belong to Zheng He's fleet. The types of the seven sunken ships were Shachuan (沙船), Fuchuan (福船), and Zhanzuochuan (戰座船).

=== Commemoration ===
In the People's Republic of China and the Republic of China, 11 July is Maritime Day (中国航海日, Zhōngguó Hánghǎi Rì) and is devoted to the memory of Zheng He's first voyage. Initially, Kunming Changshui International Airport was to be named Zheng He International Airport.

In 2015, Emotion Media Factory dedicated a special multimedia show "Zheng He is coming" for amusement park Romon U-Park (Ningbo, China). The show became a finalist of the amusement industry prestigious Brass Rings Awards by IAAPA.

Zheng He is the namesake of the ROCS Cheng Ho missile frigate in Taiwan. Zheng He is one of the few non-Americans to be the namesake of a US Navy ship called the USS Cheng Ho which survived the attack on Pearl Harbor in 1941.

The People's Liberation Army Navy ship Zheng He (AX-81) is a Chinese training ship named for him. Like her namesake, she serves as a goodwill ambassador for China, becoming the first Chinese Navy ship to visit the United States in 1989 and completing a circumnavigation of the globe in 2012.

The sample-return spacecraft Tianwen-2 was originally named ZhengHe. It launched in 2025 with the mission to explore Near-Earth asteroid 2016 HO3.

Named after the explorer, the Zheng He Seamount is an underwater mountain in the Arabian Sea. It is located southwest of Socotra island at 11°44′18″N 55°08′18″E.

== Gallery ==
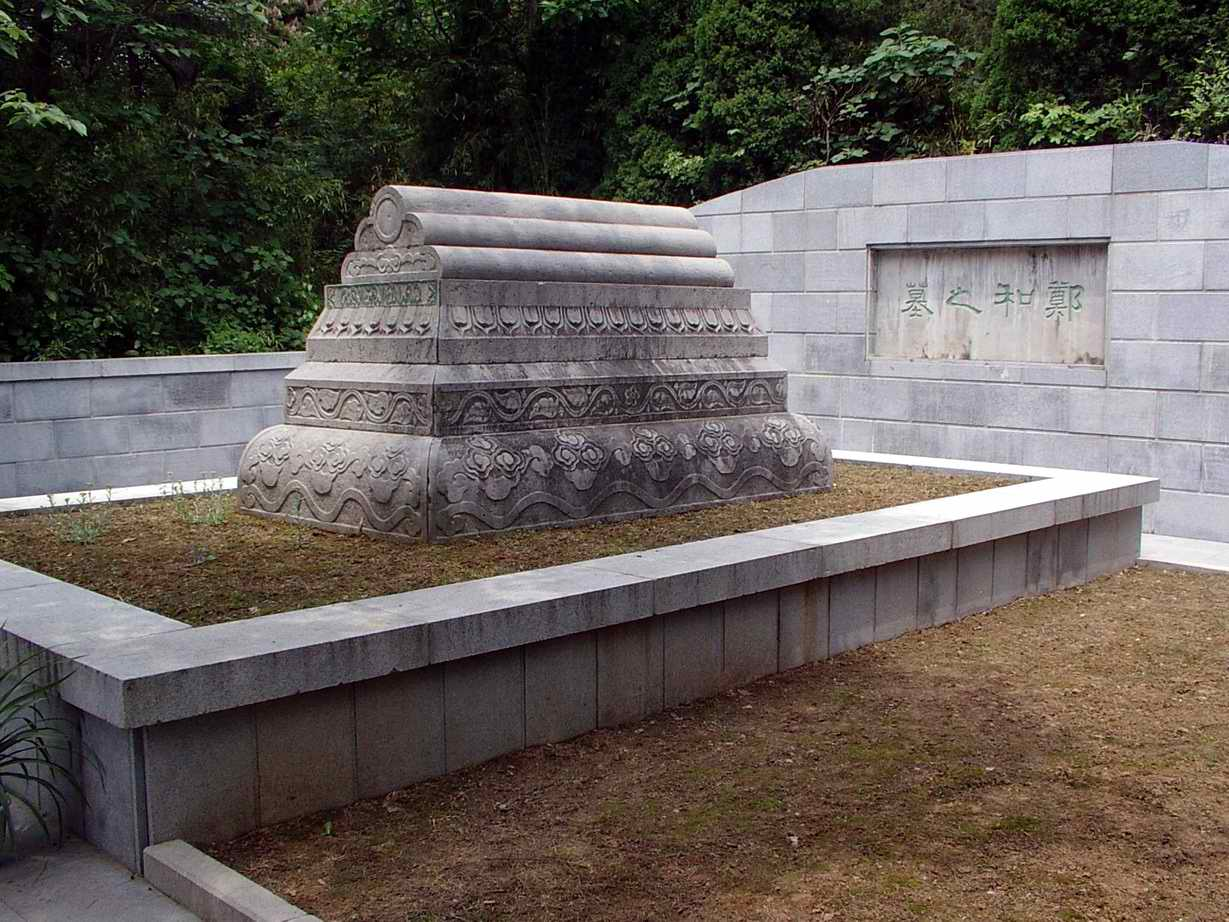
Zheng He's tomb in Nanjing

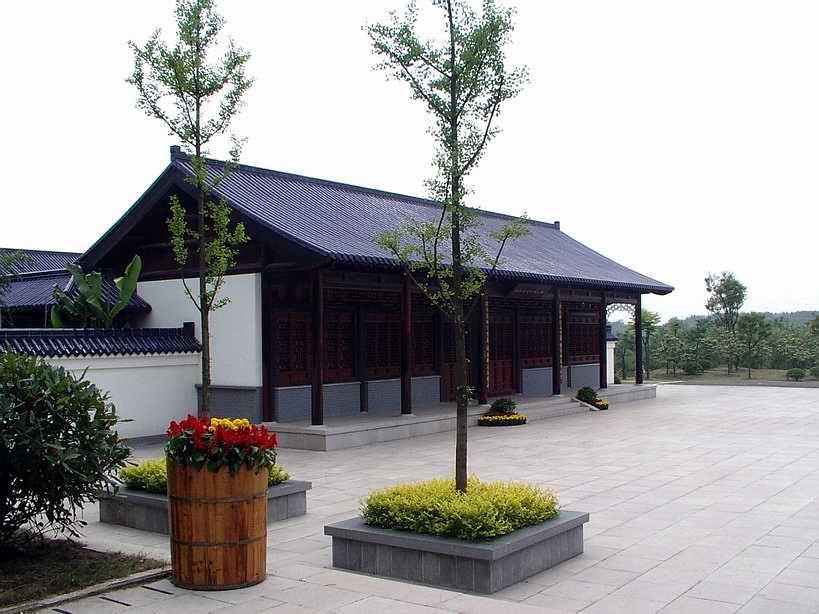
Museum to honour Zheng He, Nanjing

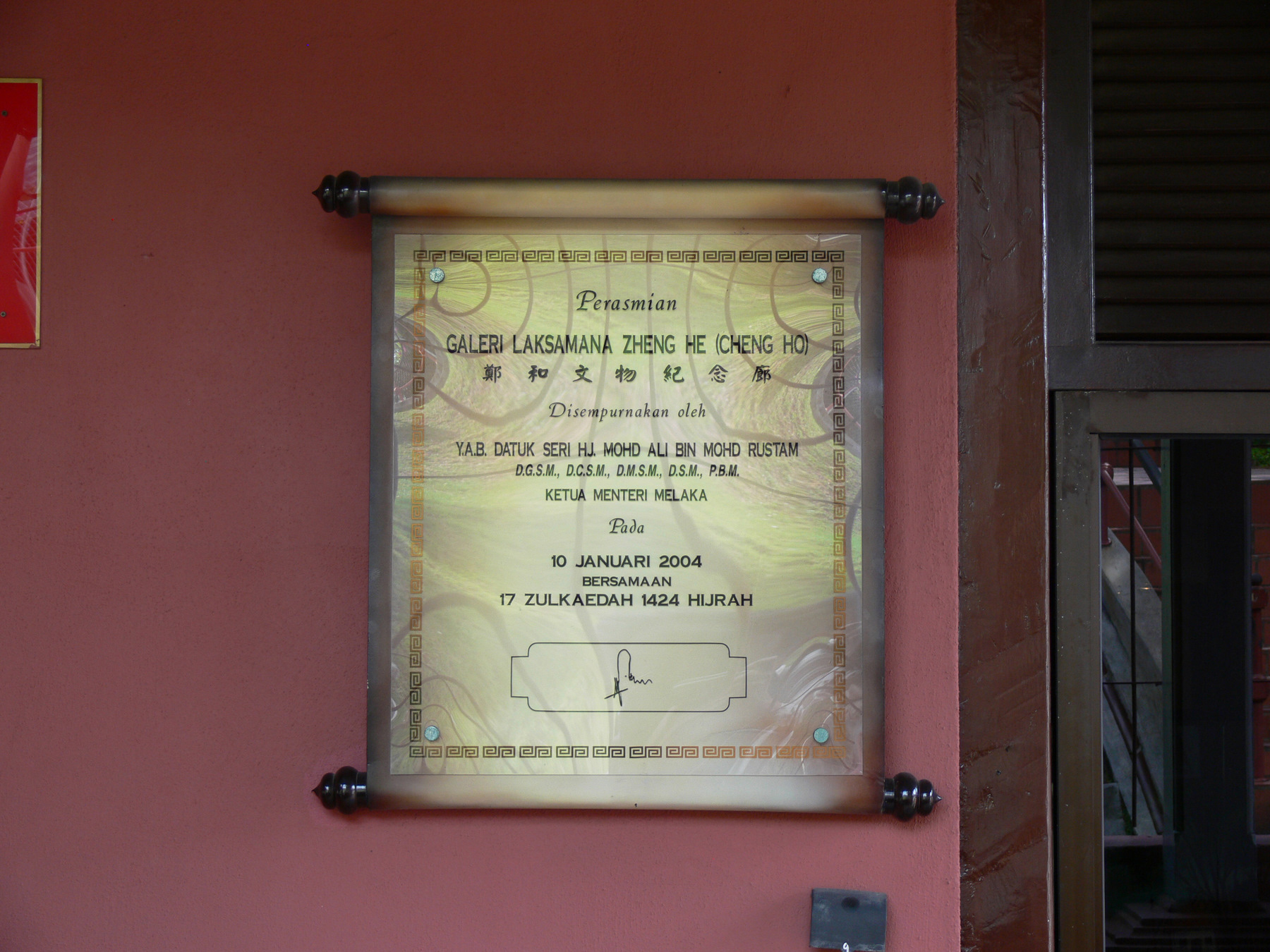
Gallery of Admiral Cheng Ho in Malacca

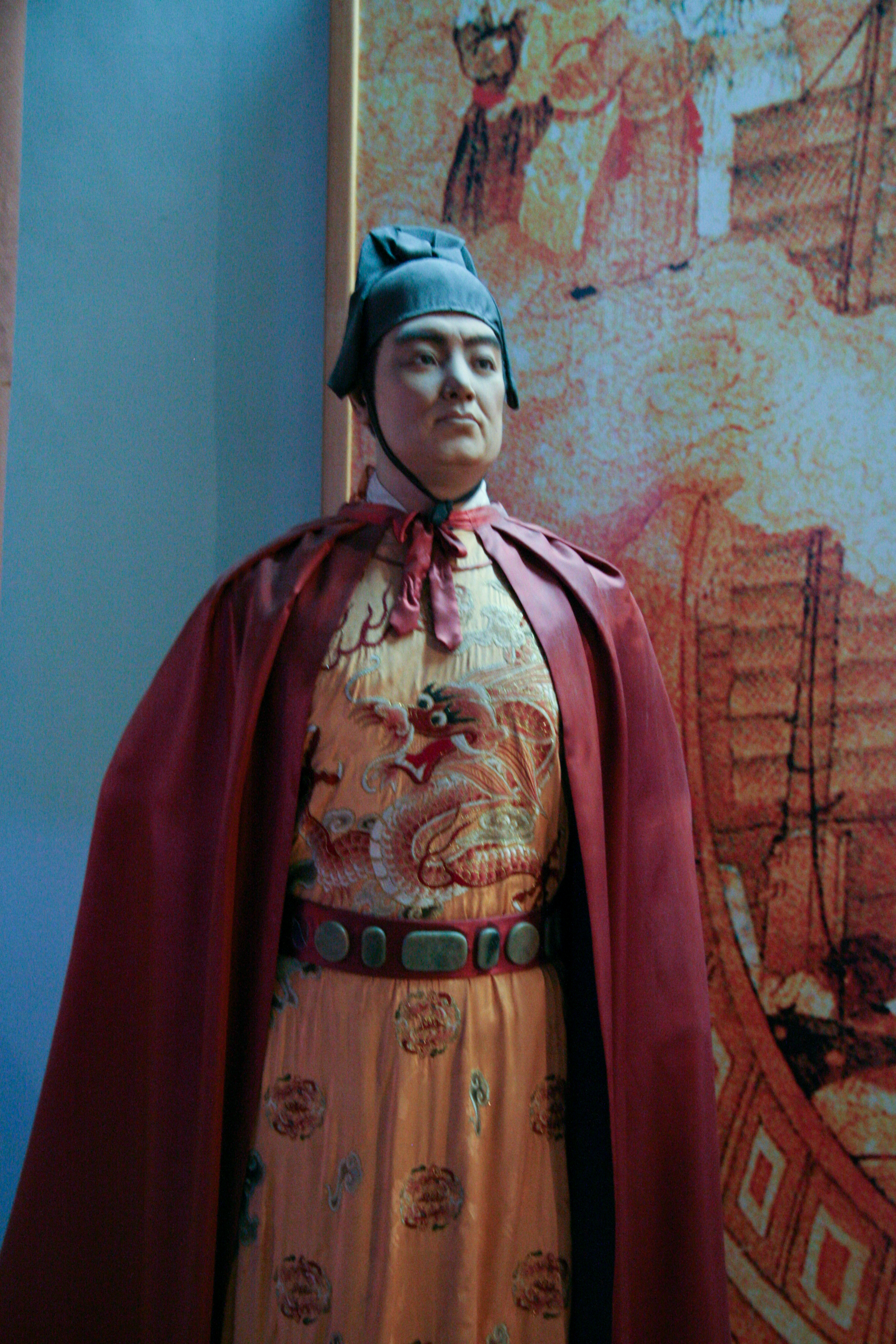
Zheng He wax statue in the Quanzhou Maritime Museum

== See also ==
- Chang Yuchun – Chinese general (1330–1369)
- Chinese exploration – 2nd-century BC – 15th-century travels abroad
- CMA CGM Zheng He
- Fei Xin – Ming dynasty explorer and writer
- Galle Trilingual Inscription – Stone tablet erected in 1411 in Galle, Sri Lanka
- Hong Bao – Ming dynasty explorer
- Hou Xian – Ming dynasty eunuch envoy
- Hui – Chinese-speaking ethnoreligious group
- Ma Huan – Chinese translator, voyager, and writer (c. 1380–1460)
- Man-cheti – 14th century cotton stuff from India
- Ming dynasty – Imperial dynasty of China (1368–1644)
- Ming Veritable Records – Imperial annals of Ming dynasty emperors
- Romon U-Park – Amusement park in Ningbo, China
- Timeline of the Ming treasure voyages
- Zhou Man
- Zhu Di – Emperor of China from 1402 to 1424
