= Chinese ship Zheng He =

Chinese training ship

Zheng He
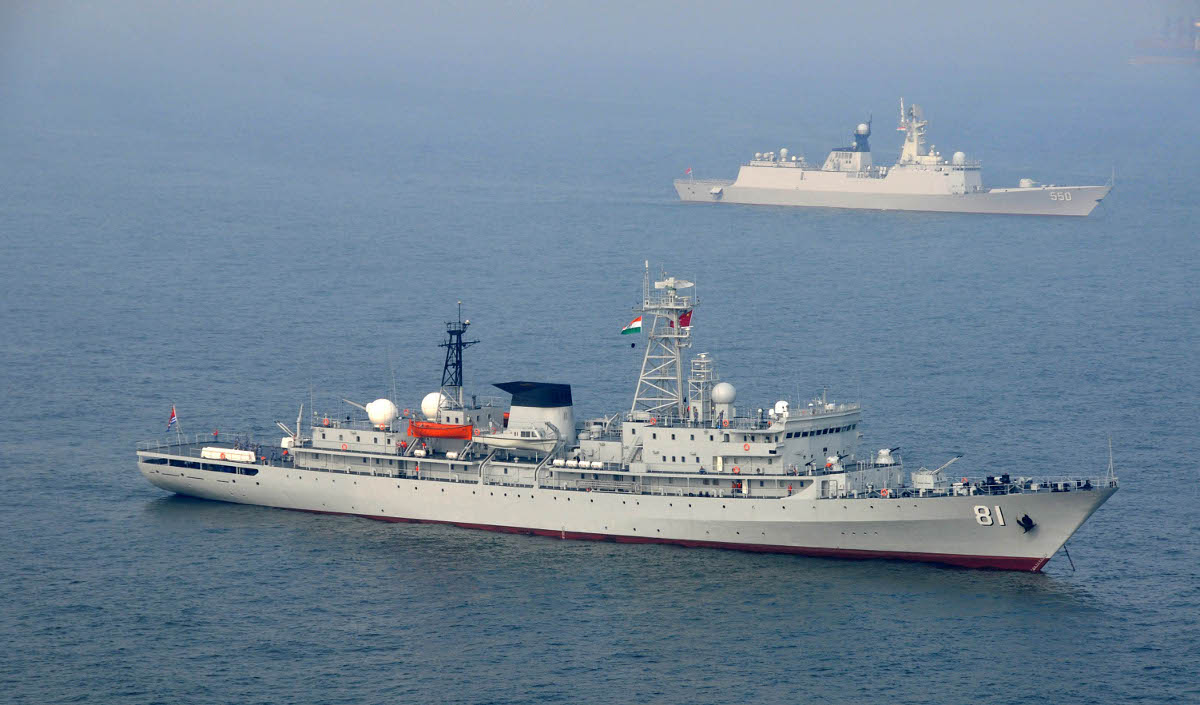
- Zheng He (foreground) at Visakhapatnam, India, in 2014

History

China
- Name: Zheng He
- Namesake: Zheng He
- Builder: Qiuxing, Shanghai
- Launched: 12 July 1986
- Commissioned: 27 April 1987
- In service: 1987-Present
- Identification: Hull number: 81
- Status: Active

General characteristics
- Type: Training ship
- Displacement: 5558 tons (full)
- Length: 130 m (430 ft)
- Beam: 16 m (52 ft)
- Draft: 4.8 m (16 ft)
- Propulsion: 2 SEMT-Pielstick 6PC2-5L diesels, 2 shafts, 6.73 MW
- Speed: 15 kn (28 km/h; 17 mph)
- Range: 5,000 nautical miles (9,300 km; 5,800 mi) at 15 kn
- Complement: 170; Instructors: 30; Cadets: 200
- Armament: 2 twin 57 mm; 2 twin 30 mm guns; 2 FQF 2500 12-tubed ASW mortars

Zheng He is a Chinese People's Liberation Army Navy training ship. Its NATO reporting name is Daxin. The ship is a Naval Academy unit based with the North Sea Fleet.

Zheng He was the first domestically designed and built oceangoing training ship. Its visit to Pearl Harbor in 1989 was the PLA's first port visit to the United States since 1949.

The ship circumnavigated Earth between April to September 2012. When the ship left Dalian on 17 April, it was expected to be the first such voyage by a lone Chinese training vessel.
