= Malaysia Federal Route 192 =

Road in Malaysia

Federal Route 192
- Jalan Syed Abdullah Aziz (Malacca Coastal Highway)
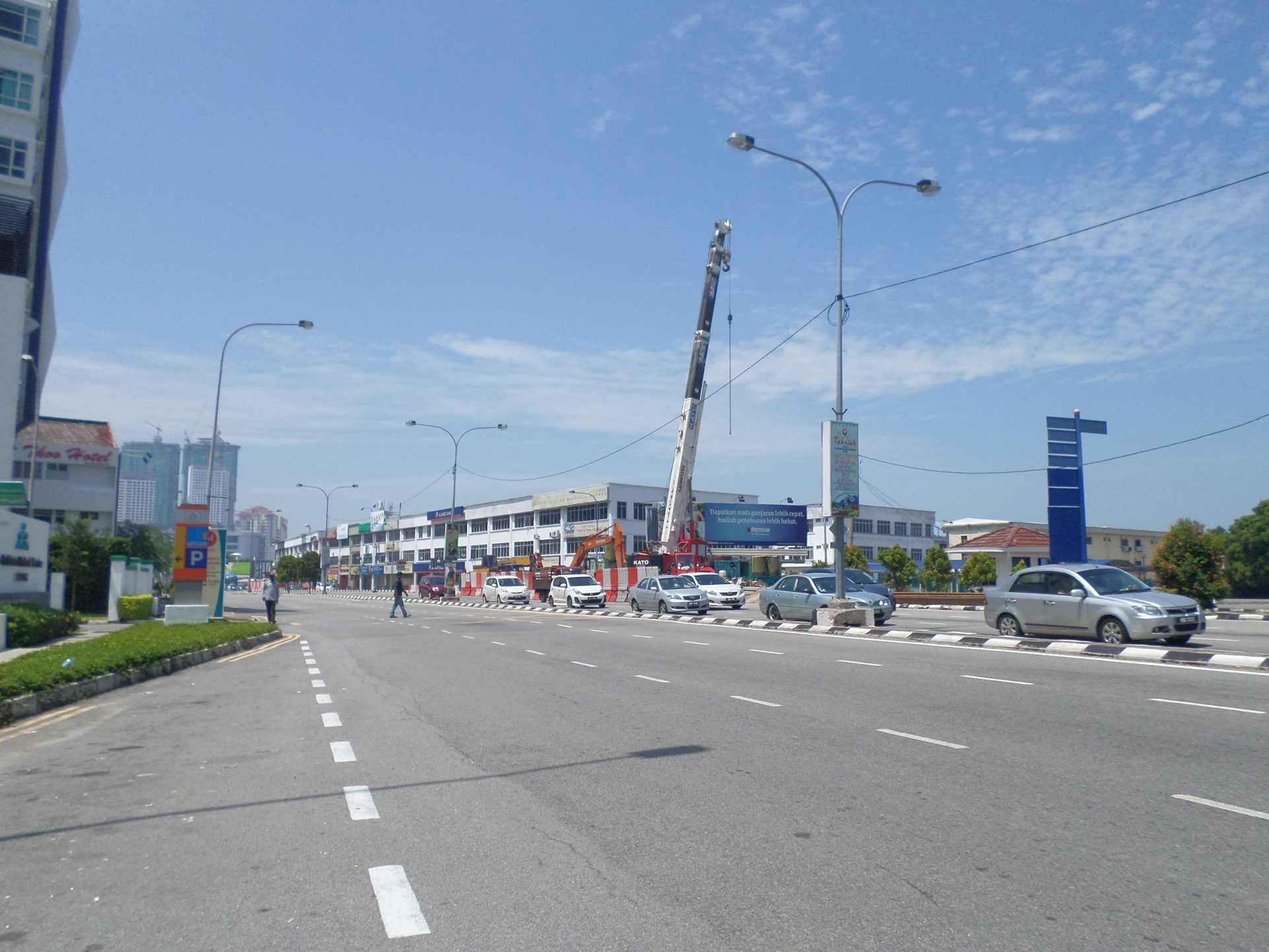

Route information
- Maintained by Malaysian Public Works Department
- Length: 3.10 km (1.93 mi)
- Existed: 1998–present
- History: Completed in 2001

Major junctions
- Northwest end: Kampung Limbongan
- Jalan Bukit Senjuang; M100 Jalan Padang Temu; FT 5 Jalan Tengkera
- Southeast end: City Centre

Location
- Country: Malaysia
- Primary destinations: Klebang, Tengkera, Malacca Island, Taman Melaka Raya, Padang Temu

Highway system
- Highways in Malaysia; Expressways; Federal; State

Jalan Syed Abdullah Aziz or Malacca Coastal Highway, Federal Route 192, is a coastal highway in Malacca City, Malacca, Malaysia. This coastal highway was built as a bypass of the Malacca City Centre and was built to shorten the travel distance between Bandar Hilir and Kampung Limbongan town area from 10 km (estimated) to 5 km (estimated).

The Kilometre Zero of the Federal Route 192 starts at the City Centre. The highway passing Pulau Melaka junctions, Mahkota junctions, Malacca Coastal Bridge, Taman Kota Laksamana junctions and finally Kampung Limbongan junctions.

== History ==
The construction of the highway was proposed in 1996 and it was part of the Malacca coastal development project such as Mahkota Parade, Taman Melaka Raya, Taman Kota Laksamana and Malacca Island. When the reclamation land for the project was done in the late 1990s. Construction of the highway began in 1998 and was completed in 2001. Phase 2 was built from Taman Kota Laksamana junctions to Kampung Limbongan junctions.

== Features ==
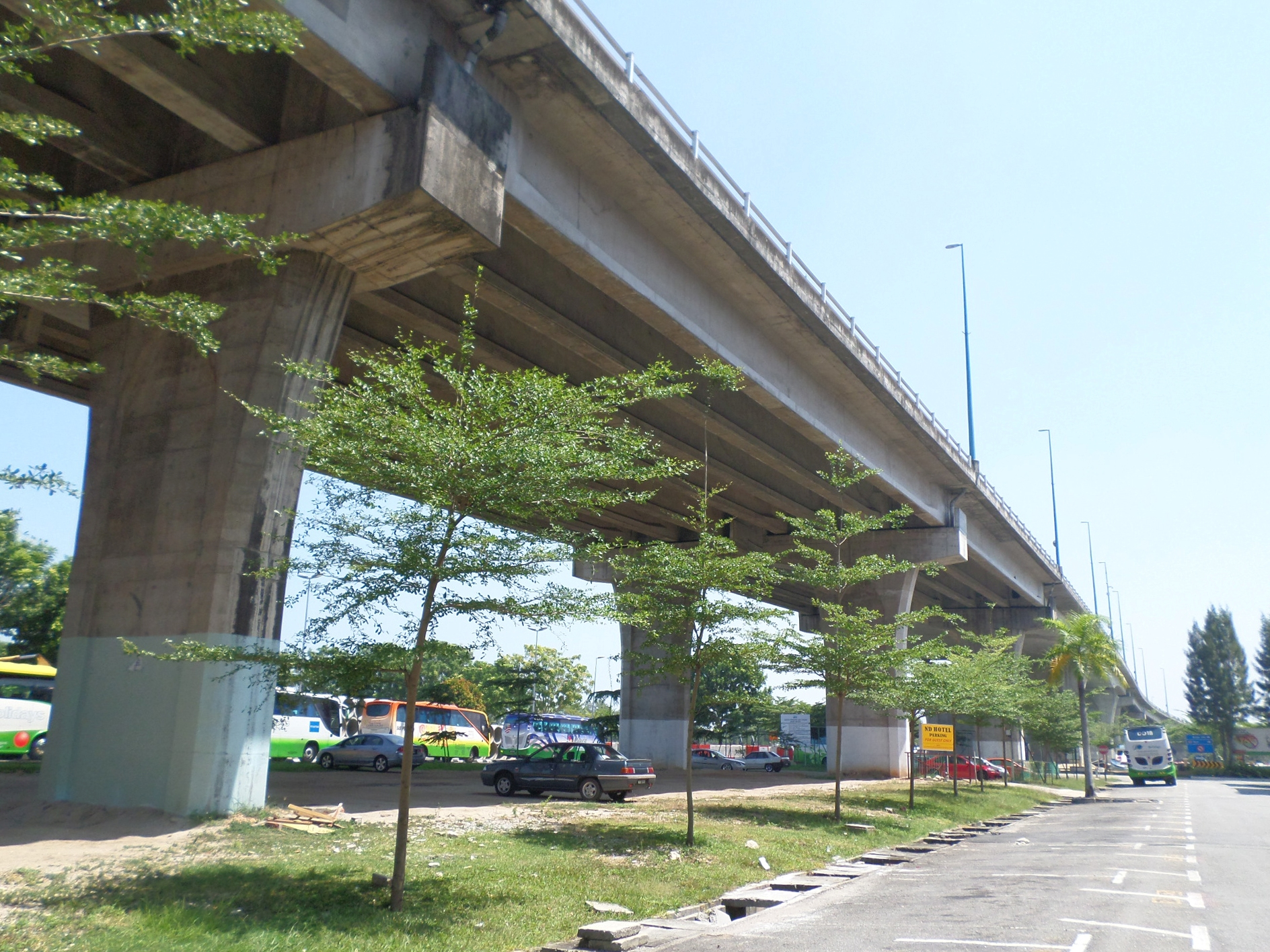
Malacca Coastal Bridge.

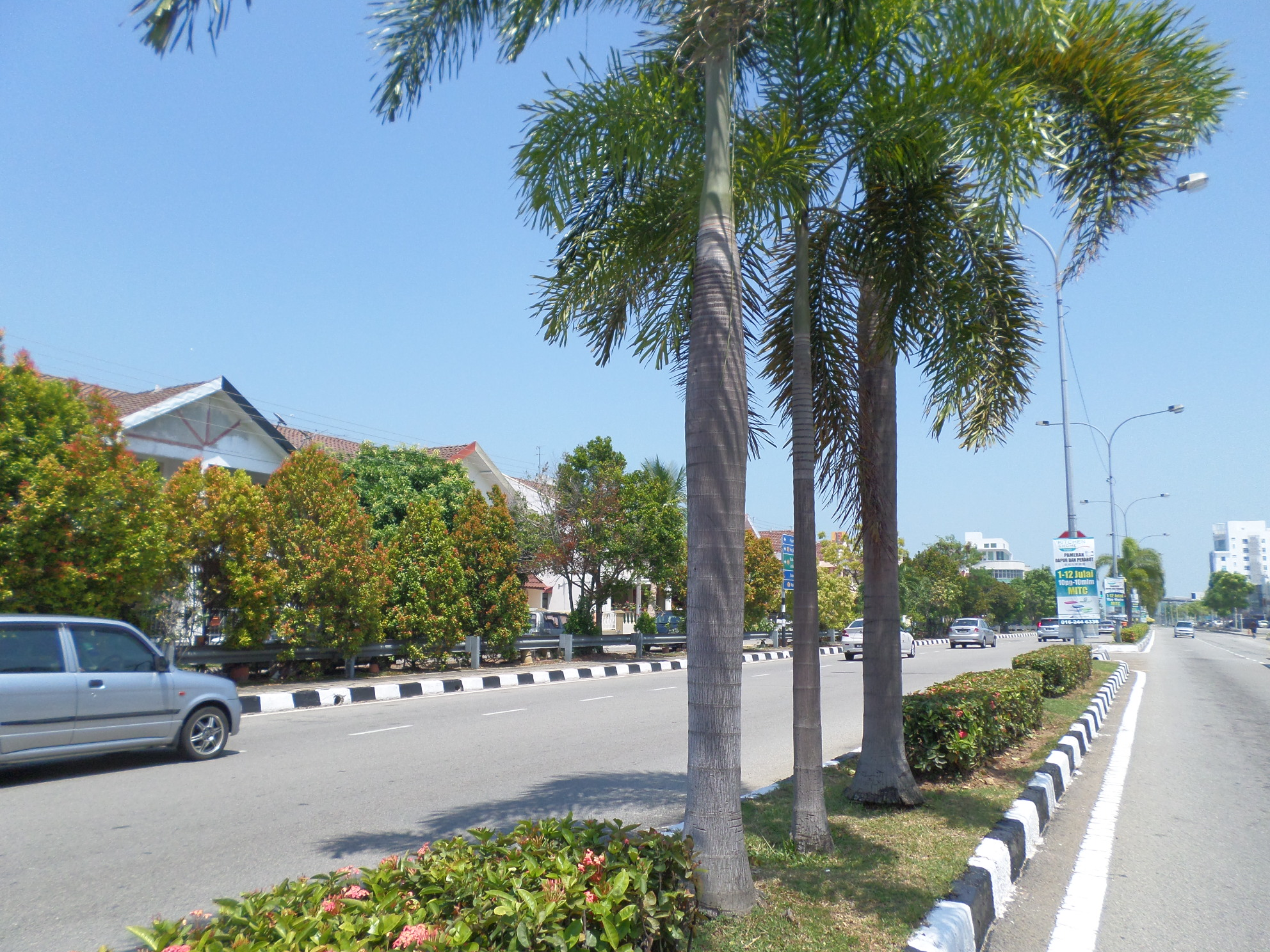
Taman Kota Laksamana

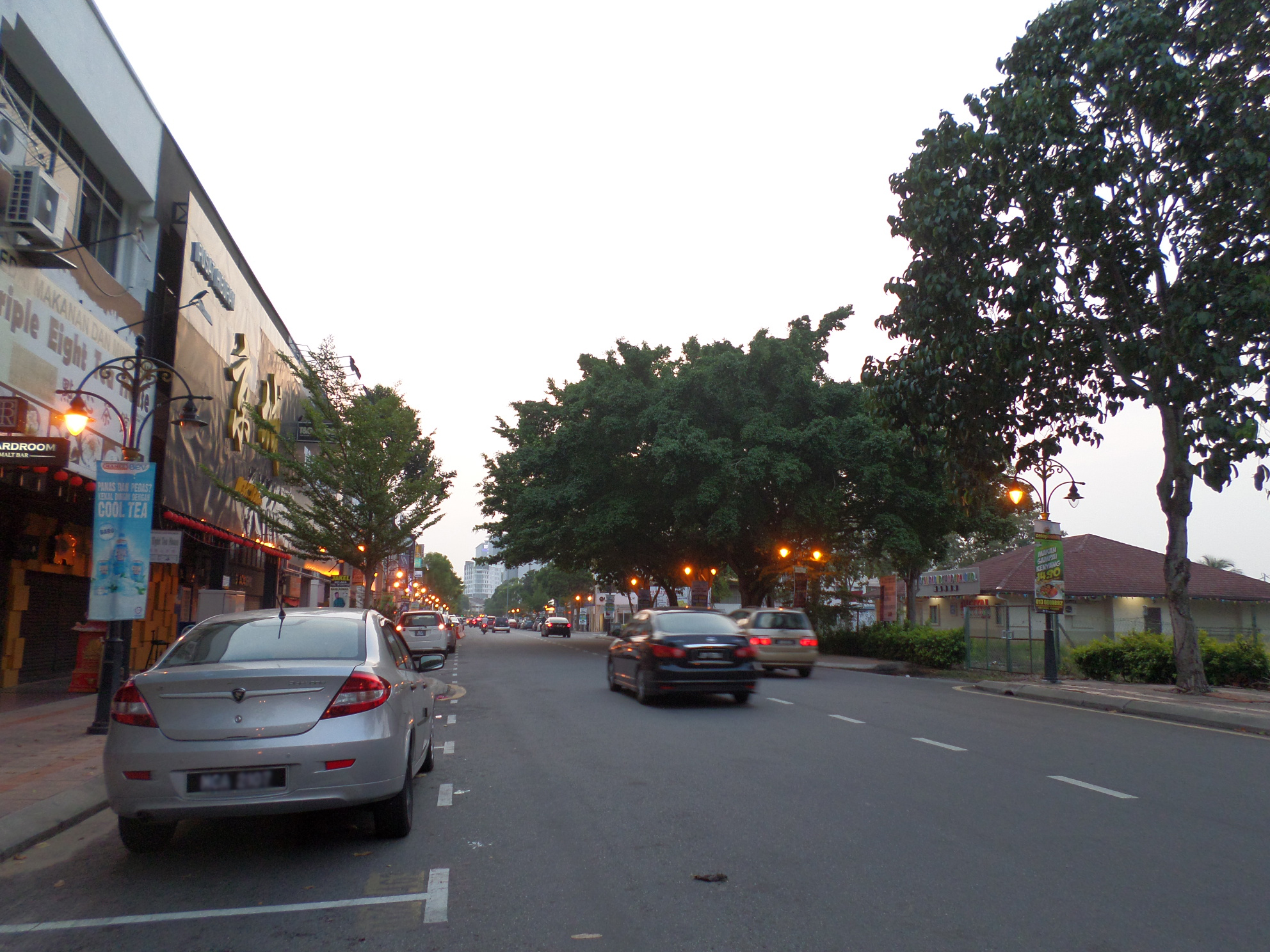
Taman Melaka Raya

- Malacca Coastal Bridge - A box-girder-shaped bridge which crosses the Malacca River, built as a bypass to shorten the travel distance between the city centre and the Kampung Limbongan town area from 10 km (estimated) to 5 km (Estimated).

At most sections, the Federal Route 192 was built under the JKR R5 road standard, allowing maximum speed limit of up to 90 km/h.

== Junction lists ==
The entire route is located in Melaka Tengah District, Malacca.

Legend:

- I/C - Interchange, I/S - Intersection, RSA - Rest and service area, OBR - Overhead bridge restaurant, R/R - Restaurant and rest plaza, L/B - Layby, V/P - Vista point, TN - tunnel, T/P - Toll plaza, BR - Bridge
- C - Cloverleaf, S - Stack, T-A - Trumpet-A, T-B - Trumpet-B, DT - Directional-T/Y, SDT - Semi-Directional-T/Y, P-Y - Partial-Y, D - Diamond, P-C - Partial cloverleaf, D-D - Diverging diamond, D-R - Direct ramp

Location	km	mi	Exit	Name	Destinations	Notes
Malacca City	0.0	0.0	1	Malacca City Centre	Jalan Bukit Senjuang – Jalan Laksamana Hang Li Po, Bandar Hilir, Padang Temu, St John's Fort, Portuguese Square; FT 5 Malaysia Federal Route 5 – Umbai, Merlimau, Muar, Batu Paha; Jalan Merdeka – Taman Melaka Raya, City Centre, Historical Places of Malacca (UNESCO World Heritage Sites)	Junctions
Malacca City				Future junctions		
Malacca City			2	Pulau Melaka I/S	Jalan Pulau Melaka 1 – Pulau Melaka Bridge, Pulau Melaka, Melaka Gateway, Malacca Straits Mosque	Junctions
Malacca City	1.0	0.62				
Malacca City				Century Mahkota Hotel Melaka	Century Mahkota Hotel Melaka	
Malacca City	2.0	1.2				
Malacca City			3	Mahkota I/S	Mahkota Parade, Mahkota Medical Centre	Junctions
Malacca City	3.0	1.9	4	Malacca River Bridge; Malacca Coastal Bridge; Jalan PM Exit	Jalan PM – Malacca Ferry Terminal, Bandar Hilir, Historical Places of Malacca (UNESCO World Heritage Sites), Mahkota Parade, Mahkota Medical Centre	Ramp on/off below bridge Start/End of bridge
Malacca City			Malacca River Bridge; Malacca Coastal Bridge			
Malacca City			Malacca River Bridge; Malacca Coastal Bridge; Start/End of bridge			
Malacca City			5	Taman Kota Laksamana I/S	Jalan Kota Laksamana – City Centre, Jalan Hang Tuah, Alor Gajah, Tengkera, Submarine Museum	Junctions
Malacca City			6	Taman Limbongan I/S	Jalan Kristal – Taman Limbongan	T-junctions
Malacca City			7	Kampung Limbongan I/S	FT 5 Jalan Tengkera – Tanjung Kling, Sungai Udang, Masjid Tanah, Port Dickson, Tengkera, City Centre	Junctions
1.000 mi = 1.609 km; 1.000 km = 0.621 mi: Proposed
