= Malacca Coastal Bridge =

Malacca Coastal Bridge Jambatan Pantai Melaka
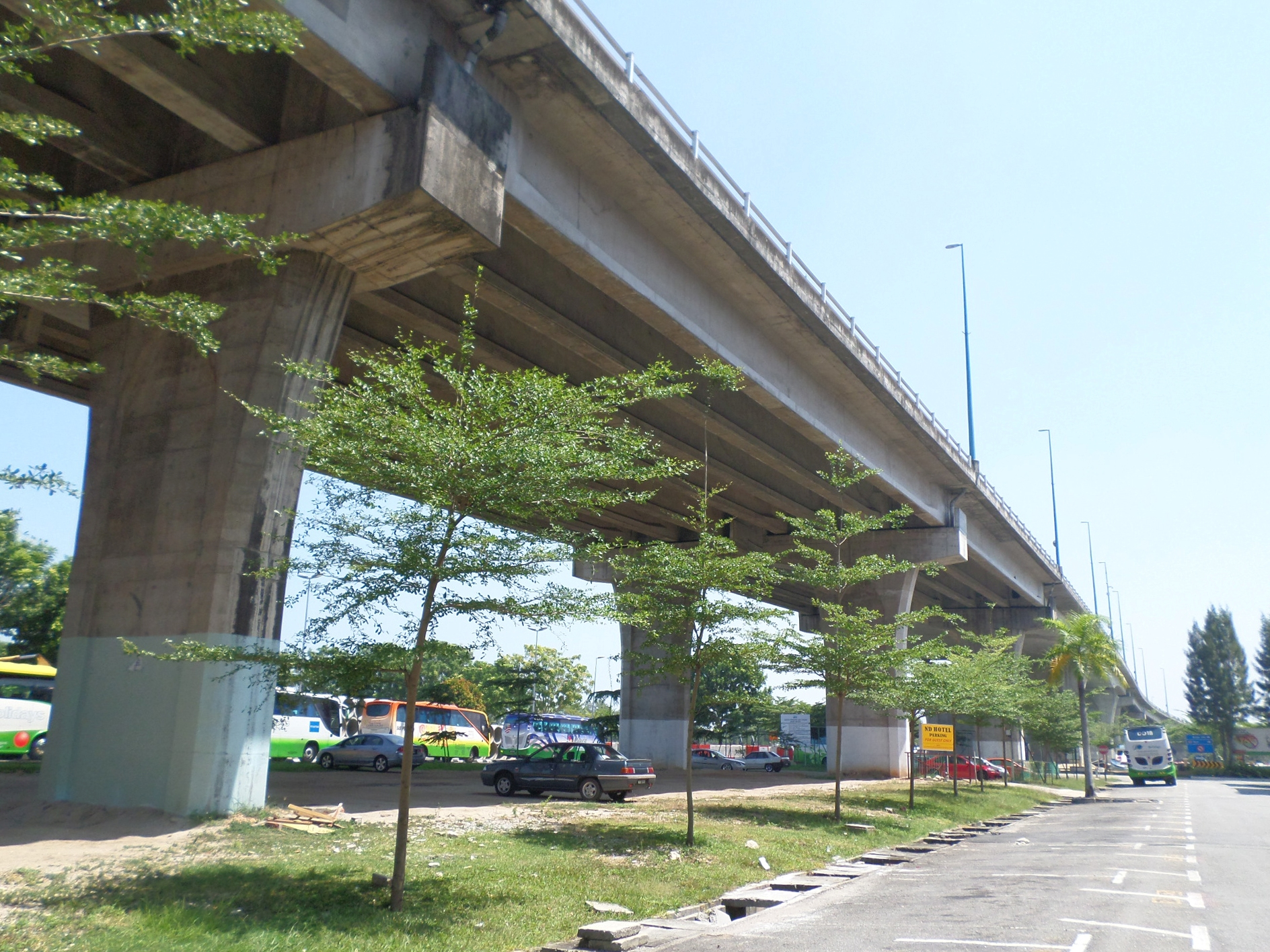
- Coordinates: 2°11′20″N 102°14′38″E
- Carries: Motor vehicles, Pedestrians
- Crosses: Malacca River
- Locale: Federal Route 192 Jalan Syed Abdullah Aziz, Malacca City
- Official name: Malacca Coastal Bridge
- Maintained by: Malaysian Public Works Department (JKR) Melaka; Majlis Bandaraya Melaka Bersejarah (MBMB)

Characteristics
- Design: Box girder bridge
- Total length: --
- Width: ~25 meters
- Longest span: --

History
- Designer: Malaysian Public Works Department (JKR) Melaka
- Constructed by: Malaysian Public Works Department (JKR)
- Opened: 2001

Malacca Coastal Bridge (Malay: Jambatan Pantai Melaka) is a river bridge of a box girder design in Malacca City in Malacca, Malaysia. The bridge crosses Malacca River. The bridge is built as a bypass of Malacca City and is built to shorten the travel distance between Bandar Hilir to Kampung Limbongan town area from 10 km (estimated) to 5 km (estimated). The bridge is part of Syed Abdullah Aziz Road.

== History ==
The construction of the bridge was proposed in 1996 and it was part of the Malacca coastal development project such as Mahkota Parade, Taman Melaka Raya, Taman Kota Laksamana and Malacca Island. When the reclamation land for the project was done in the late 1990s, construction of the bridge began in 1999 and was completed in 2001. In 2024, warning signs were installed.

== See also ==
- Transport in Malaysia
