= Malacca Island =

Man-made island off the coast of Malacca City, Malaysia

Native name: Pulau Melaka
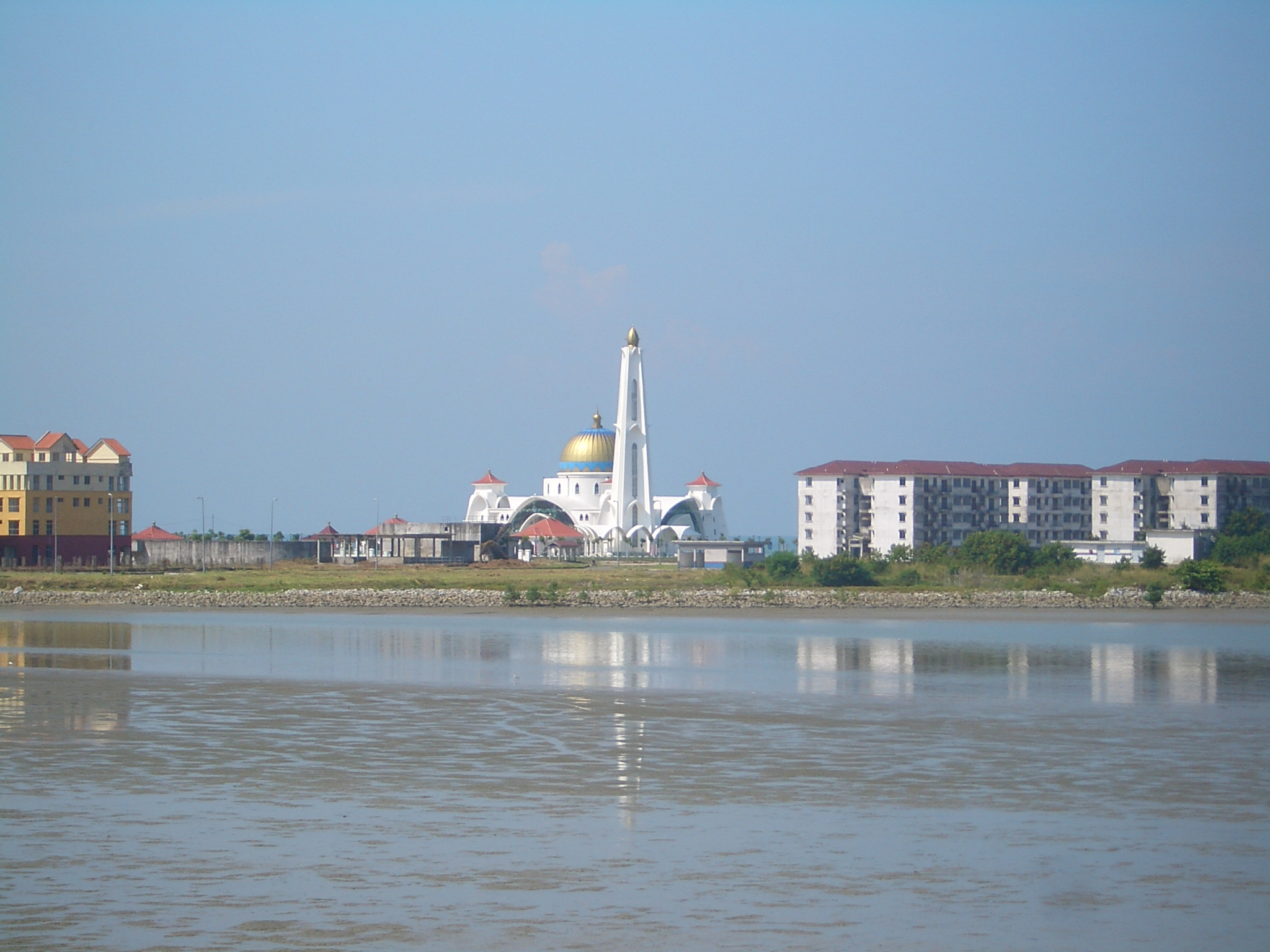
- Malacca Straits Mosque and apartments on Malacca Island seen from the nearby pier on the mainland
- Interactive map of Malacca Island

Geography
- Location: Strait of Malacca
- Coordinates: 2°10′46.98″N 102°15′3.82″E
- Area: 1.2 km^{2} (0.46 sq mi)

Administration
- Malaysia
- State: Malacca
- District: Melaka Tengah
- Mukim: City centre

Additional information
- Time zone: MST (UTC+8)
- Postal code: 75000

Malacca Island (Malay: Pulau Melaka) is a man-made islet approximately 0.5 km off the coast of Malacca City – the capital city of the Malaysian state of Malacca, just south of its business district of Taman Melaka Raya. It is formed from the reclamation of land around an islet of the same name, also formerly named Jawa Island (Malay: Pulau Jawa, not to be confused with Indonesia's Java Island) originally a tidal island in the mid-1990s, when the Malacca State Government under then Chief Minister, Abdul Rahim Thamby Chik was planning to turn it into a "Malacca Manhattan" for business and recreational purposes.

The island became part of the RM 2 billion "Twin Island City Centre" waterfront project undertaken by Pulau Kembar Sdn Bhd (formerly Inno Enhance Sdn Bhd), a defunct joint-venture of Larut Consolidated Berhad and Talam Corporation Berhad, which involved the reclamation of two islands measuring 40ha and 50ha respectively and launched in May 1996 by then-Prime Minister Mahathir Mohamad. This project was planned to comprise mixed residential and commercial development together with leisure-cum-tourism amenities such as marine theme park, marina, hotels and waterfront activities. It was the first artificial island project and the only twin-island development project in the country. The reclamation of the first island and a 300m bridge linking to the mainland had been completed so far, but the second island was never built, with the project experienced numerous completion delays since construction began.

Following the subsequent abandonment of its twin-island project by the original developer in the late-1990s due to Asian Financial Crisis, KAJ Development Sdn Bhd intervened and revived the project under the name of Melaka Gateway in 2014. The revived project was planned to have four artificial islands with additional port and industrial zone facilities, including one planned island and this island under the original developer and one adjacent natural island – Panjang Island (Malay: Pulau Panjang). However, due to a series of obstacles, the project was scaled down to only this island alone with a cruise terminal.

== Education ==
JT International School Melaka is the only school on Malacca Island. Its site was formerly an animal theme park called Wildlife Theatre Melaka. This school offers Cambridge curriculum from pre-school level until year 11.

== Tourist attractions ==
Name	Description
Malacca Straits Mosque	A mosque built on top of columns above the water, with a lighthouse-like minaret, located on the southern shore of the island.

== Cancelled development projects ==
Name	Description
Arab City Melaka (Phase 1)	Arab-themed commercial development project currently on hold, with the first of three phases built on the island, but abandoned halfway through construction.
Eye on Malaysia	Planned ferris wheel project, but never built.

== See also ==
- Andaman Island, Penang
- Jurong Island
- Tanjong Pinang
- Geography of Malaysia
- List of islands of Malaysia
