= Malacca State Route M100 =

Road in Malaysia

Melaka Route 100

Major junctions
- Northwest end: Bandar Hilir
- FT 5 Federal Route 5 FT 192 Federal Route 192
- Southeast end: Telok Mas

Location
- Country: Malaysia
- Primary destinations: Malacca Town, Portuguese Square, Padang Temu

Highway system
- Highways in Malaysia; Expressways; Federal; State

Malacca State Route M100, Jalan Padang Temu is a major road in Malacca state, Malaysia

== Junction lists ==
The entire route is located in Melaka Tengah District, Malacca.

Legend:

- I/C - Interchange, I/S - Intersection, RSA - Rest and service area, OBR - Overhead bridge restaurant, R/R - Restaurant and rest plaza, L/B - Layby, V/P - Vista point, TN - tunnel, T/P - Toll plaza, BR - Bridge
- C - Cloverleaf, S - Stack, T-A - Trumpet-A, T-B - Trumpet-B, DT - Directional-T/Y, SDT - Semi-Directional-T/Y, P-Y - Partial-Y, D - Diamond, P-C - Partial cloverleaf, D-D - Diverging diamond, D-R - Direct ramp

Location	km	mi	Destinations	Notes
Bandar Hilir			Jalan Bukit Senjuang – Jalan Laksamana Hang Li Po, St John Fort; Jalan Merdeka – Taman Melaka Raya, Malacca City Centre, Historical Places of Malacca (UNESCO World Heritage Sites); FT 192 Malaysia Federal Route 192 – Pulau Melaka, Taman Kota Laksamana, Tengkera, Klebang, Masjid Tanah	Junctions
Bandar Hilir			Portuguese Square	
Padang Temu			Taman Temu Jaya	Junctions
Padang Temu			Kampung Padang Temu	
Telok Mas			Sungai Duyong Bridge	
Telok Mas			Kampung Permatang Pasir	
Telok Mas			FT 5 Malaysia Federal Route 5 – Malacca City, Jasin, Ayer Keroh, Alor Gajah, Umbai, Merlimau, Muar, Batu Pahat	T-junctions
1.000 mi = 1.609 km; 1.000 km = 0.621 mi
