= Penicillium pimiteouiense =

Scientific classification
- Kingdom: Fungi
- Division: Ascomycota
- Class: Eurotiomycetes
- Order: Eurotiales
- Family: Aspergillaceae
- Genus: Penicillium
- Species: P. pimiteouiense

Binomial name
- Penicillium pimiteouiense S.W. Peterson 1999

Type strain
- CBS 102479, NRRL 25542

Species of fungus

Penicillium pimiteouiense is a species of fungus in the genus Penicillium which was isolated from sandy beach soil from the Penang Island in Peninsular Malaysia.
