= Gurney Bay =

Urban park in George Town, Penang, Malaysia

- Teluk Gurney (Malay)
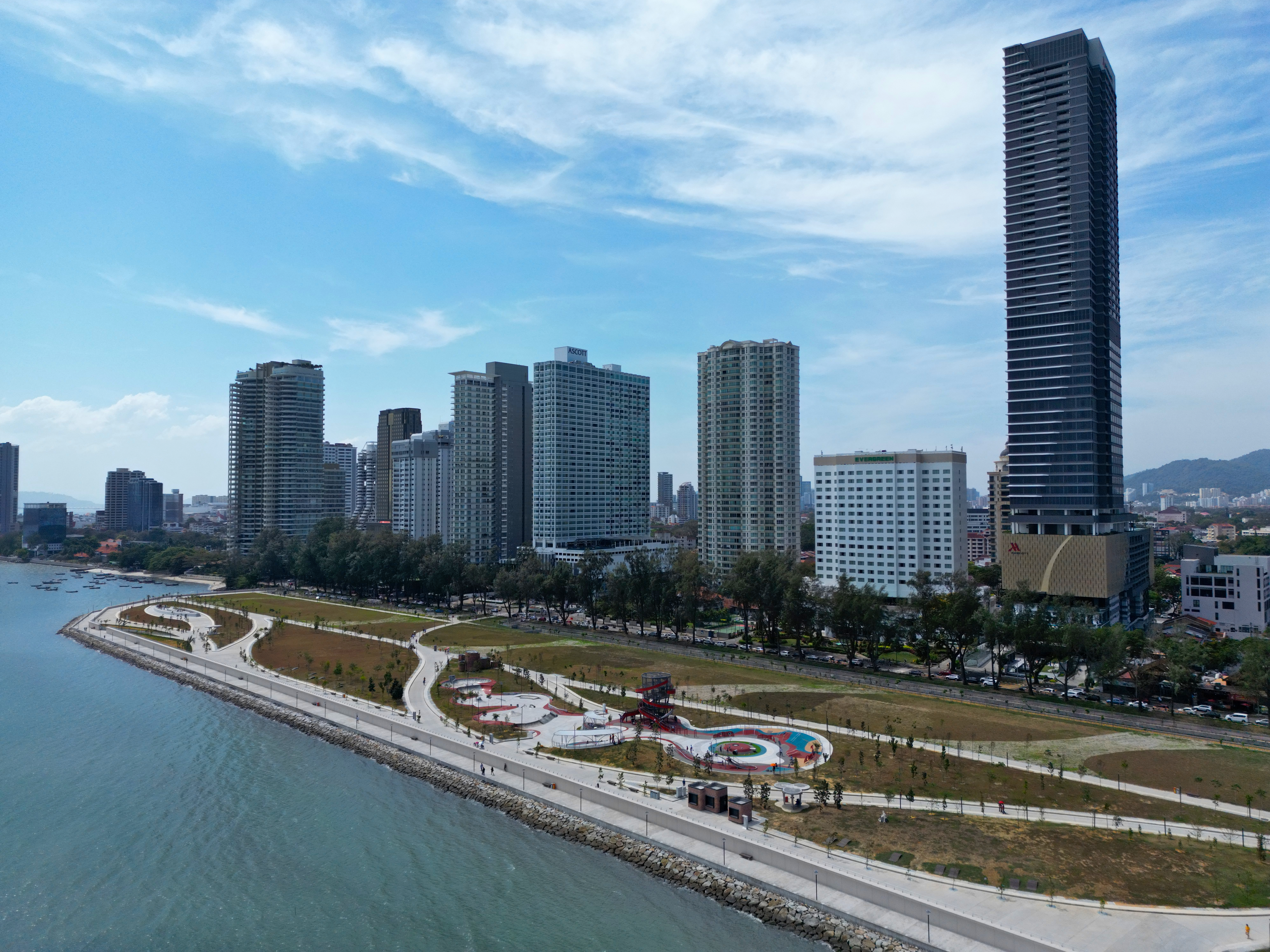
- Interactive map of Gurney Bay
- Type: Urban park
- Location: Gurney Drive, George Town, Penang, Malaysia
- Coordinates: 5°26′24″N 100°18′45″E
- Area: 24.28 ha (60.0 acres)
- Created: 2016

Gurney Bay (Malay: Teluk Gurney), formerly known as Gurney Wharf, is a seafront park within George Town in the Malaysian state of Penang. Intended as a "new iconic waterfront destination for Penang", the first phase of this public space off Gurney Drive was opened to public in 2024.

Upon the expected completion of Gurney Bay by 2025, the 24.28-hectare (0.2428 km^{2}) park will comprise four distinct recreational zones - a beach, a coastal grove, a water garden and a lifestyle area. The park forms part of the Tanjong Pinang suburb, in spite of its location along George Town's Central Business District.

== History ==
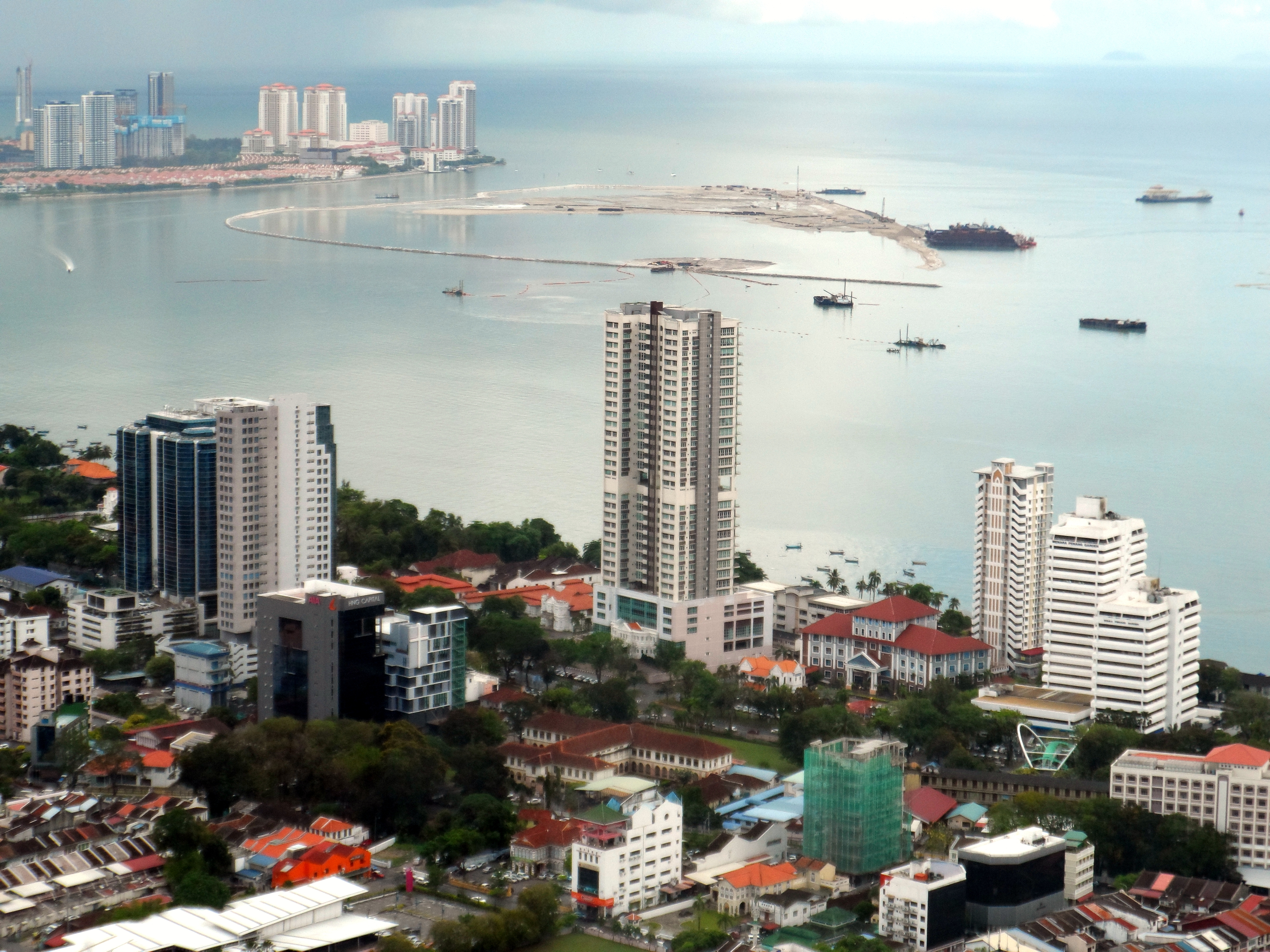
Gurney Bay during the early stages of reclamation in 2017

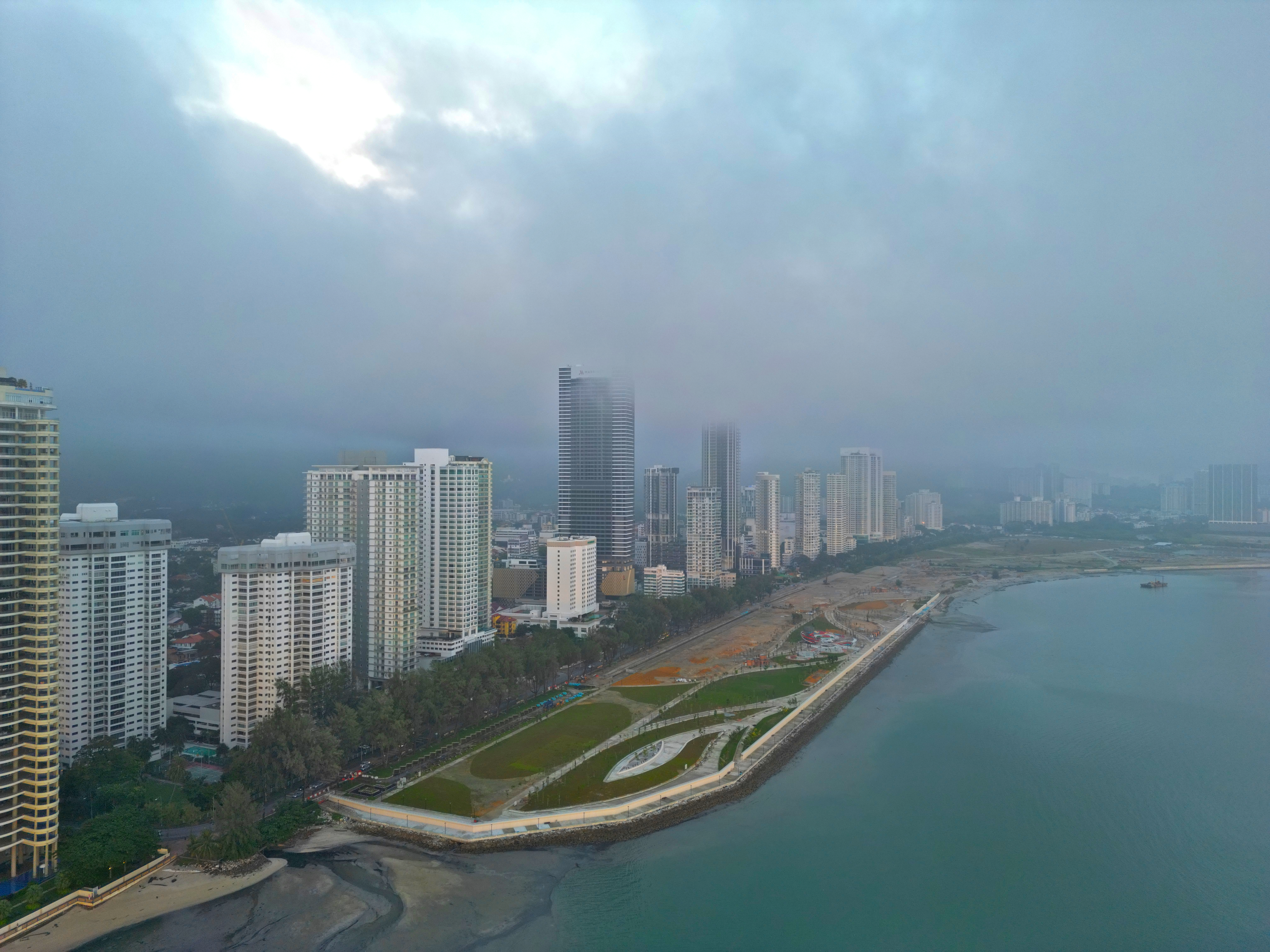
First phase of Gurney Bay in 2023

Originally, plans to reclaim land off Gurney Drive were intended to provide more land for residential development, particularly the Seri Tanjong Pinang project which was carried out by Tanjung Pinang Development Sdn Bhd. The Penang state government later proposed turning 24.28 hectares of the reclaimed land into a seafront public park.

Accordingly, the parent firm of Tanjung Pinang Development, Eastern & Oriental Berhad, is to surrender 131 acres (530,000 m^{2}) of the reclaimed land for free to the Penang state government. Reclamation costs will be borne by Eastern & Oriental, while the landscaping expenses will be covered by the Penang state government.

In addition, Eastern & Oriental, at its own expense, also sought the services of three internationally renowned architectural consultants - GDP Architects, Grant Associates and Jerde. The combined credentials of the three firms include major urban projects such as Singapore's Gardens by the Bay and the Roppongi Hills in Tokyo.

In 2016, land reclamation off Gurney Drive commenced, creating an almost 2 km (1.2 miles)-long bund that is 100 metres from Gurney Drive at its nearest point and about 500 metres at its furthest by the end of the year. This was done by Tanjung Pinang Development Sdn Bhd The method of reclamation was the sand filling and soil treatment method, similar to Tuas Biomedical Park 2, Hong Kong Disneyland, Hong Kong International Airport, the Betuweroute Railway and the Palm Jumeirah.

In 2023, the Penang state government under Chief Minister Chow Kon Yeow declared the renaming of Gurney Wharf to Gurney Bay "to better reflect the location and concept of the project". It was also announced that the first phase of the Gurney Bay project is slated for completion by the same year. In 2024, Phase 1 of the Gurney Bay project was opened to public.

== Phases ==
=== Phase 1 ===
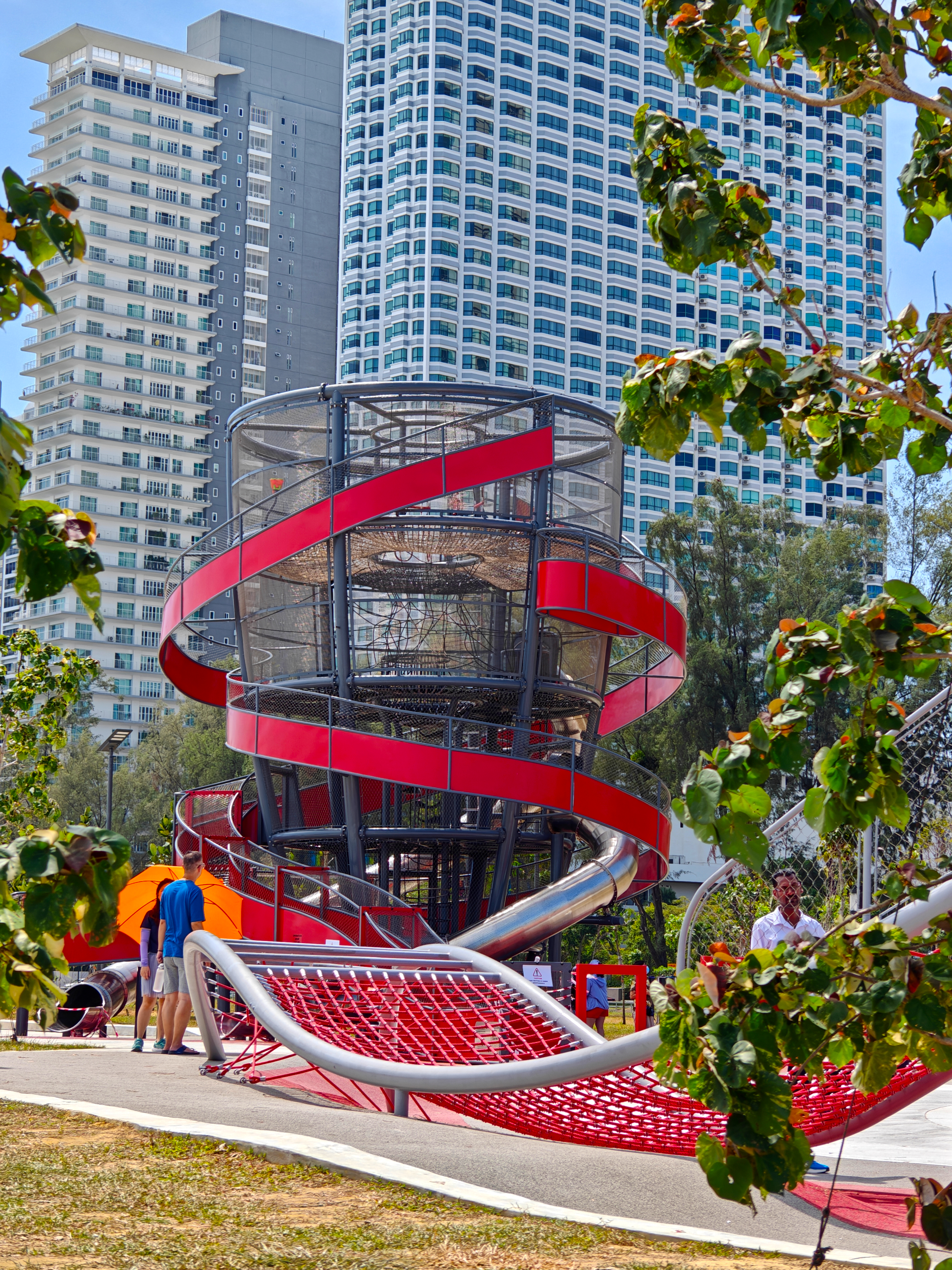
A helter skelter slide at the Phase 1 playground

The first phase envisioned various recreational components, such as a beach, a coastal grove and water gardens. The Gurney Drive coast was to be extended by incorporating an artificial beach 400 m (1,300 ft) long. The water gardens section borrowed elements from the Gardens by the Bay in Singapore, including wetlands irrigated by an innovative water filtration system.

Groundbreaking of Phase 1 took place in May 2022. Construction of the park took one year and seven months. Opened to public in 2024, Phase 1 now features a seafronting promenade, a playground, a skate park, kiosks, toilet and open air car parks. According to Chief Minister Chow Kon Yeow, a total of 1,500 trees and 10,000 shrubs have been planted within Phase 1.

=== Phase 2 ===
The second phase involves the construction of the lifestyle zone with retail and food and beverages (F&B) outlets, dining facilities, and a pier walk. The famous Gurney Drive Hawker Centre will also be moved to this location upon the completion of Phase 2, scheduled in 2025.

In December 2019, it was announced that the reclamation of Phase 2 had been completed. Construction works began in 2020 on recreational amenities such as a promenade, a park, a skating rink, a children's playground and a man-made beach.

== See also ==
- Gurney Drive
