= Dataran Pahlawan Melaka Megamall =

Shopping mall in Malacca City, Malacca, Malaysia

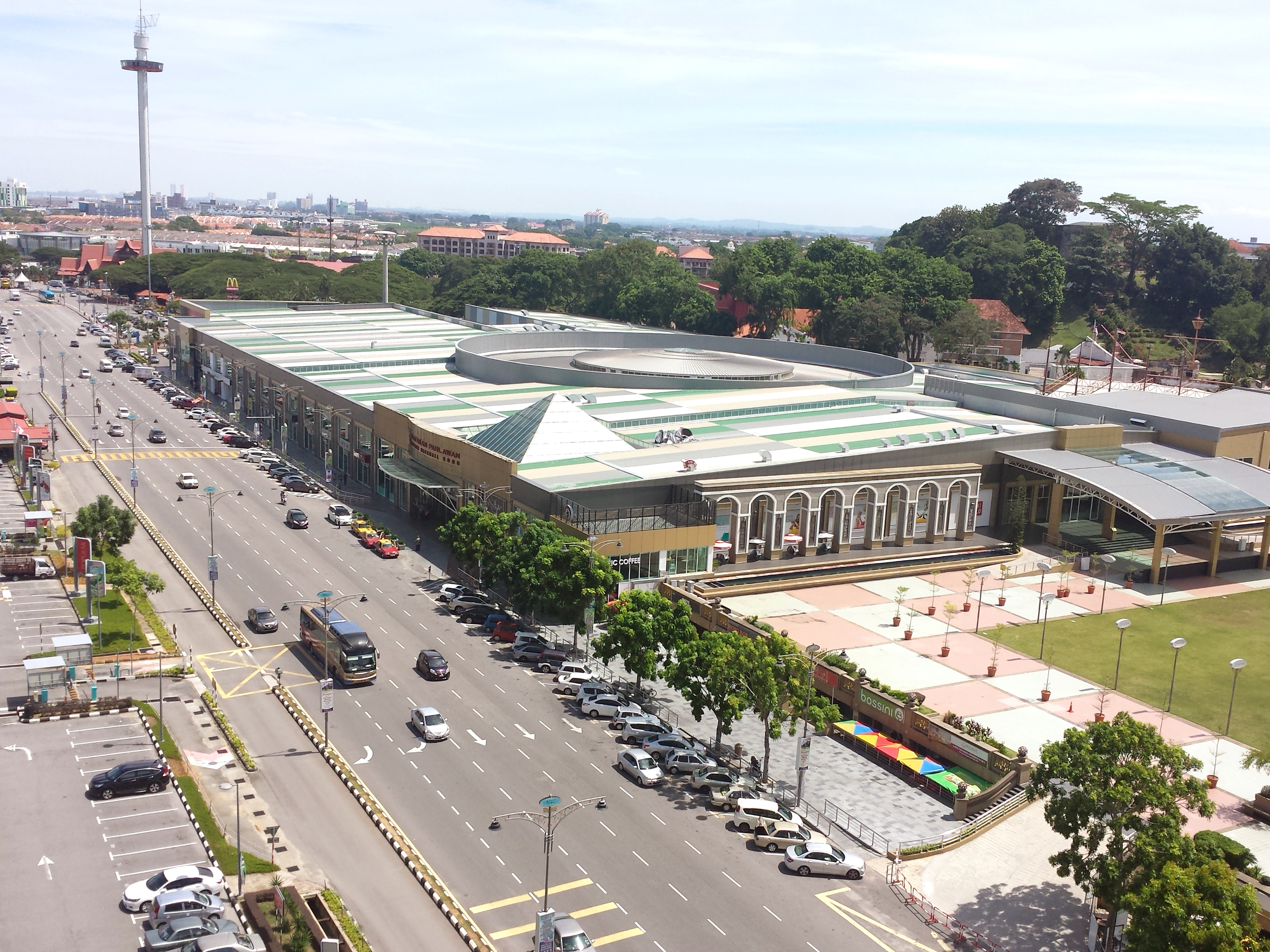
- Bird's-eye view of the shopping mall in the city centre.
- Location: Malacca City, Malacca, Malaysia
- Coordinates: 2°11′N 102°15′E
- Opened: 25 September 2006
- Owner: Hatten Group Sdn. Bhd.
- Floor area: 140,000 m^{2} (1,500,000 sq ft)
- Website: Official website

Dataran Pahlawan Melaka Megamall (transl. Malacca Heroes Square Megamall) is a shopping mall located in Malacca City, Malacca, Malaysia. It was developed and is owned by Hatten Group Sdn Bhd on a 7.7 hectares site in the city, and is the biggest lifestyle shopping megamall in the state. The mall has a gross area of 140,000 m^{2} (1,500,000 sq ft) and a net retail area of 70,000 m^{2} (750,000 sq ft).

The land where the mall now stands was initially a seaside green space reclaimed from sea during the British colonial era named Bandar Hilir Park and later Heroes Esplanade (Padang Pahlawan), where the date of the independence of Malaya was announced. But further land reclamation from 1974 until the early 1990s changed much of the coastline of then Malacca Town, resulting in the Heroes Esplanade becoming a green space in the middle of the city.

In 2001, Malacca state government-owned company Kumpulan Melaka Berhad (Malacca Group Limited) carried out a RM60 million project to transform Heroes Esplanade into Heroes Square, as well as developing nearby commercial area.

== See also ==
- List of shopping malls in Malaysia
- Mahkota Parade – the adjacent shopping mall
