= Straits Quay =

Shopping mall in George Town, Penang, Malaysia

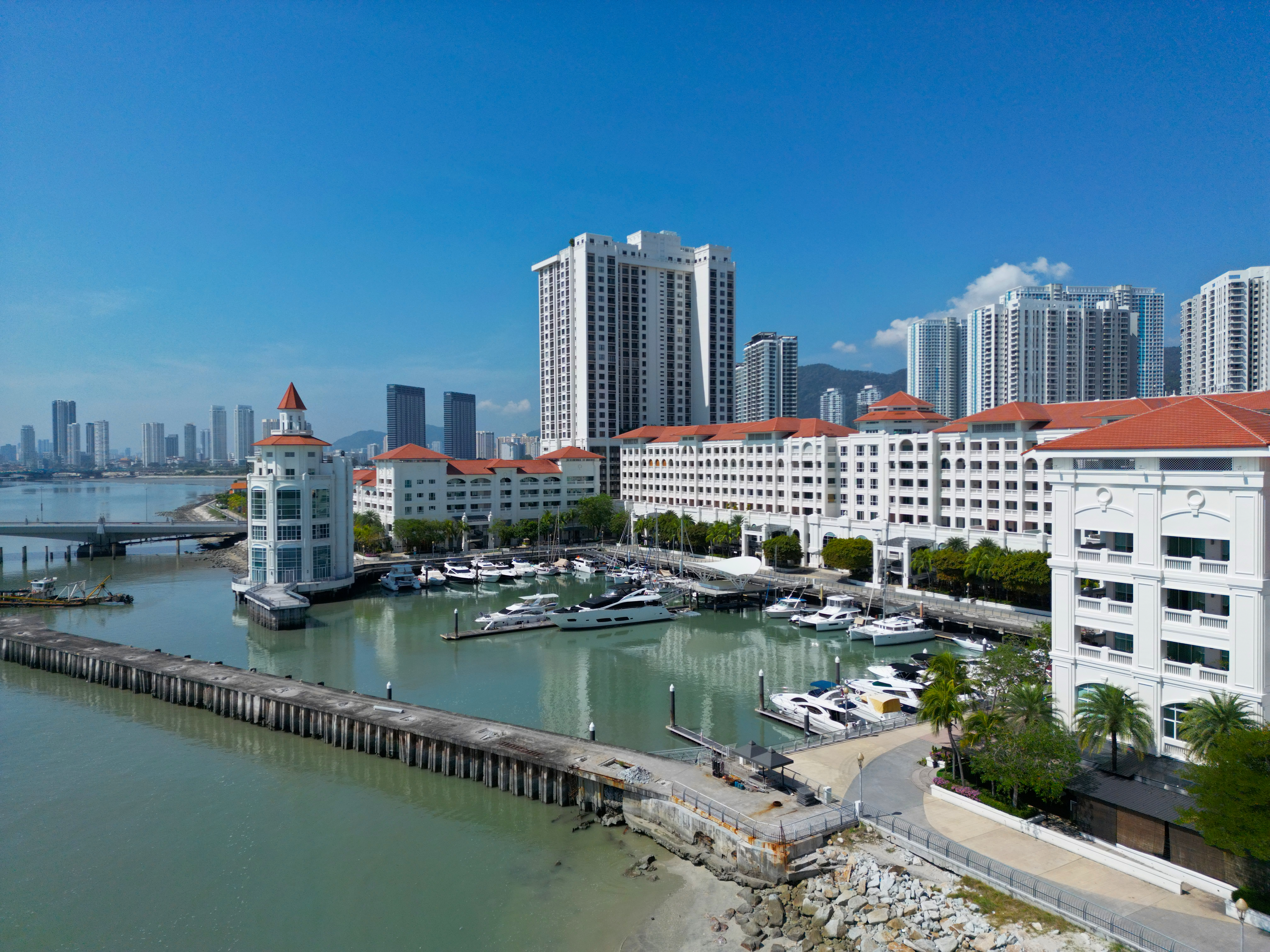
- Location: Tanjong Pinang, George Town, Penang, Malaysia
- Coordinates: 5.45906°N 100.31327°E
- Opened: 2010
- Num. of stores: 100
- Floor area: 270,000 sq ft (25,000 m^{2})
- Floors: 2
- Website: www.straitsquay.com

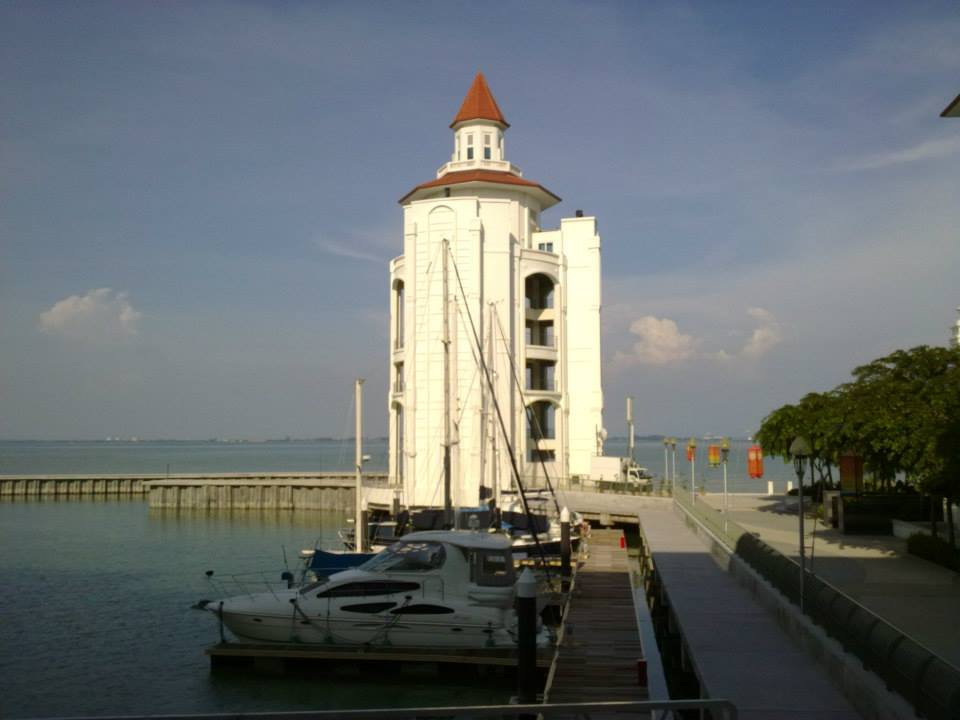
Straits Quay Marina Lighthouse

Straits Quay Retail Marina is a shopping mall-cum-marina within George Town in the Malaysian state of Penang. Located at Tanjong Pinang, it was opened in 2010 and includes a marina designed for small recreational vessels, as well as a convention centre.

Royal Selangor, a Malaysian pewter manufacturer, maintains an outlet within the mall. There is also a Performing Arts Centre within the mall. In addition, Straits Quay includes luxurious serviced apartments called The Suites @ Straits Quay, which are managed by the Eastern & Oriental Berhad, a Bursa Malaysia listed premier lifestyle property developer.

== Retail outlets ==
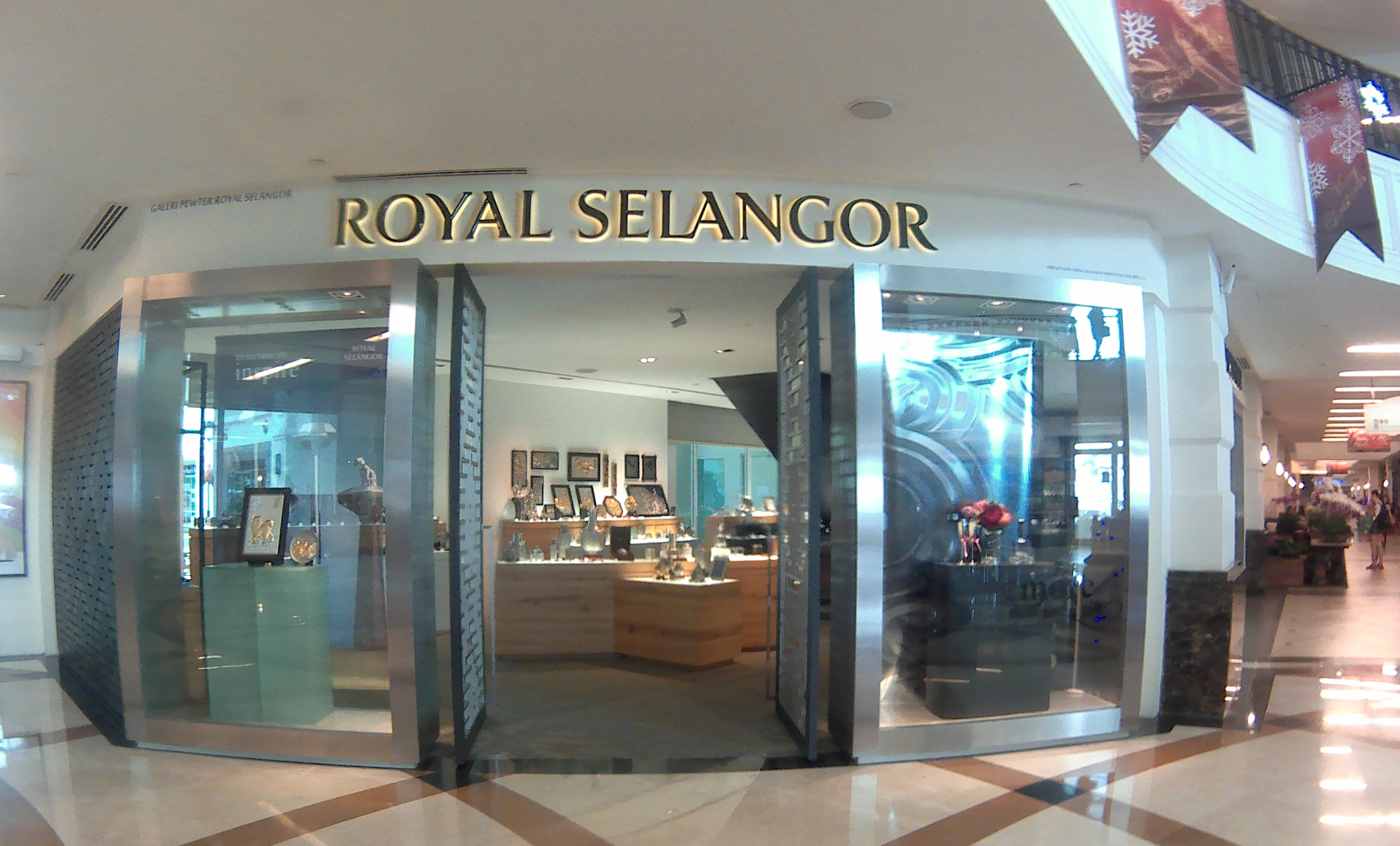
Royal Selangor Outlet

Straits Quay has a net space of 270,000 sq ft and two floors which house a total of 100 shop lots. Various retail choices and eateries are available here, including Fruuze, Healy Mac’s Irish Bar & Restaurant, Subway, Switch and Royal Selangor.

A Sam's Groceria supermarket is also available at the ground floor.

In general, the retail choices in the mall cater more to lifestyle, personal care and home furnishing. Shoppers and visitors can get to have a meal at one of the seaside cafes, restaurants and bars that offer a view of the expanse of the Malacca Straits.

Every weekend, a bargain market is held within Straits Quay, where cheaper brands and items can be purchased from about 50 stalls.

== Facilities ==
The Straits Quay Marina consists of 40 pontoon berths that can accommodate yachts and other recreational boats between 10 and 25 metres in length. The entrance of the marina has been dredged to a depth of 3 metres below sea level.

The marina also contains the Straits Quay Convention Centre (SQCC), making it one of the venues of choice within Penang for meetings, incentives, conferences and exhibitions (MICE). Spanning 25,300 sq ft (2,350 m^{2}), SQCC has a capacity of up to 150 standard exhibition booths, 2,300 delegates in a theatre setting or 1,800 guests in a banquet setting.

Sailors and tourists can stay at The Suites @ Straits Quay, the 217 luxurious serviced apartment suites just above the shopping mall.

The Performing Arts Centre of Penang (Penangpac) is housed at the 4th floor of Straits Quay, also above the shopping mall. It is equipped with a 303-seater proscenium stage, a 160-seater black box theatre, studios and gallery spaces. The arts centre, which was launched in 2011, was envisioned as the main venue within northern Malaysia for the arts, from films to street art performances.

== Transportation ==
Rapid Penang's bus 102 is the only bus route that stops at Straits Quay. In addition, a free shuttle service is offered by the mall for hotel guests coming from Batu Ferringhi.

A water limousine service is available between Straits Quay and the Eastern & Oriental Hotel, which is located within George Town's UNESCO World Heritage Site to the east. Said to be Penang's first water taxi service, the vessel, Lady Martina, also brings patrons for a ride along the northern coastline of Penang Island every Saturday evening.

== See also ==
- List of shopping malls in Malaysia
