= Arab City Melaka =

Commercial development project in Malacca City, Malaysia

Coordinates: 2°10′56.9″N 102°15′04.5″E

- Interactive map of the Arab City Melaka area

General information
- Status: Completed
- Type: Integrated development: residential, offices, retail
- Location: Malacca City, Malacca, Malaysia
- Construction started: 2009
- Completed: 2025

Design and construction
- Developer: Golden Corporate Heritage; Malacca state government

Website
- https://www.myarabcity.com

Arab City Melaka (Note: Project uses the Malay language spelling of the state's name, as opposed to the more traditional English language spelling of its name, "Malacca") was a commercial development project in Malacca City, Malacca, Malaysia jointly developed by Golden Corporate Heritage Sdn Bhd (GCH) and Malacca's state-owned enterprise. The project, considered "the first ever in the world", were billed at RM 1 Billion but has since been placed on hold.

== Project history ==
Initially, the project was planned to be situated in Jalan Ampang, Kuala Lumpur in 2007. However, an attractive offer from Malacca's Chief Minister led to the project to be moved to the state. According to the President of GCH, Sheikh Saleh Al Mansour said that the project is already marketed in 20 countries Arab. To begin with, GCH has released an initial investment of RM 400 million. The project was planned to open up job opportunities for 800 people. Local employees, who will make up 75 percent of the staff at the Arab city, will receive a seven-month training course on Arab language and culture to enable impeccable service to Arab and non tourists. The project started in January 2009 and is scheduled for completion in 2012. However, it was abandoned and the launch never took place.

Effort to revitalize the project have been urged by respective Chief Minister. In 2015, 10th Malacca Chief Minister, Idris Haron said that the state's government have established a special steering committee led by the state secretary, seeking to revive the project. The commitment to resolve the project were again mentioned by 13th Malacca Chief Minister Ab Rauf Yusoh in 2023.

== Scope ==
The project would have been done in three separate areas. First phase would have been built on Melaka Island, with area as large as 1.7 hectare, used for the development of a three-storey shopping complex including an Arabian bazaar, Middle Eastern restaurants and cafes and a unisex Arabic health and beauty spa. The second phase would have been done in Klebang where it will have a five-star hotel, a water theme park, an aquarium and a floating restaurant. An Arab Village would have been constructed at Kampung Jawa as part of the third phase of the project.

== See also ==
- Melaka Gateway
