= Melaka Gateway =

Offshore development of artificial islands in Malacca, Malaysia

Coordinates: 2.1790°N 102.2557°E

Artist's depiction of Melaka Gateway upon completion

Melaka Gateway logo

Logo of KAJ Development Sdn Bhd, developer of Melaka Gateway

Melaka Gateway (Note: The project uses the Malay-language spelling of the state's name, as opposed to the more traditional English-language spelling, "Malacca") (Chinese: 马六甲皇京港; pinyin: Mǎliùjiǎ huáng jīng gǎng; lit. 'Malacca Royal Capital Harbour') is an off-shore development of artificial islands in Malacca, Malaysia. It was launched on 7 February 2014 by Malaysia's Prime Minister Najib Razak and witnessed by Malacca Chief Minister Idris Haron. It was expected to be open in 2018 and finished completely by 2025. The project was planned to consist of four artificial islands including Malacca Island and one adjacent natural island—Panjang Island, with mixed residential and commercial development, leisure and tourism amenities, a free-trade zone, a port, and an industrial zone. However, a series of obstacles led to the project being scaled down to only Malacca Island, with a cruise terminal.

KAJ Development Sdn Bhd (abbreviated as KAJD, Chinese: 凯杰发展有限公司; pinyin: Kǎi jié fāzhǎn yǒuxiàn gōngsī) is the project's master developer.

In November 2020, the project was reportedly scrapped by the state government. Malaccan Chief Minister Sulaiman Md Ali was quoted as saying it would not be abandoned but would instead be taken over by a new developer, stating that "The development will continue, but we have some technical issues that we need to fix."

As of February 2022, the project had resumed the development of its first island—Pulau Melaka East 1 (PME1), after receiving approval from the state government through an agreement signed on 23 February.

== Reactions ==
In 2017, Chief Minister of Malacca, Idris Haron, said he was serious in developing the state into a nautical gem and could no longer tolerate any hiatus in proposed development projects created by interested developers.

The Kristang community at the Portuguese Settlement said that they had not been consulted about the project, and they have been protesting it from the beginning. In May 2018, 200 villagers participated in a demonstration outside KAJ Development's office.

China's then-Minister of Transport, Yang Chuantang, said: "With Malacca as the forefront flagship in support of the One Belt, One Road program initiated by the People's Republic of China, we will soon taste the fruits of success, especially with the plans for infrastructure, ...China is confident in Melaka Gateway's project."

Forbes described Malaysian Prime Minister Mahathir Mohamad as the "strongest opponent of Melaka Gateway". Mahathir said of the project, "We are very concerned because in the first place we don't need any extra harbor."

The chief executive of KAJD reacted to the cancellation, saying the company was contemplating taking legal action against the state and adding, "We are left with no choice. Our project is canceled after we spent millions of our own resources to conduct various environmental studies and pay licensing fees." In December 2020, KAJ filed a judicial review challenging the termination notice issued by the Malacca State Government. In February 2021, the review was dismissed by the court.

In March 2023, Transport Minister Anthony Loke announced that the project may be revived in discussions with the state government.

== Resumption ==
The resumption of the Melaka Gateways project was marked by new investors, shareholders, and team, and restarting of construction of the Melaka International Cruise Terminal.

In March 2022, KAJD signed an MOU with the Dubai Integrated Economic Zones Authority to collaborate on the investment and operations of the free-trade zone on the project's first island (PME1).

In March 2023, it was announced that the Sultan of Johor was the second-largest shareholder of the project.

On 12 September 2023, the project was back on track, following support and approvals from the state and federal governments.

== See also ==
- Megaprojects
- Arab City Melaka
- Forest City, Johor
