= Tanjong Pinang =

Suburb of George Town in Penang, Malaysia

- Suburb of George Town
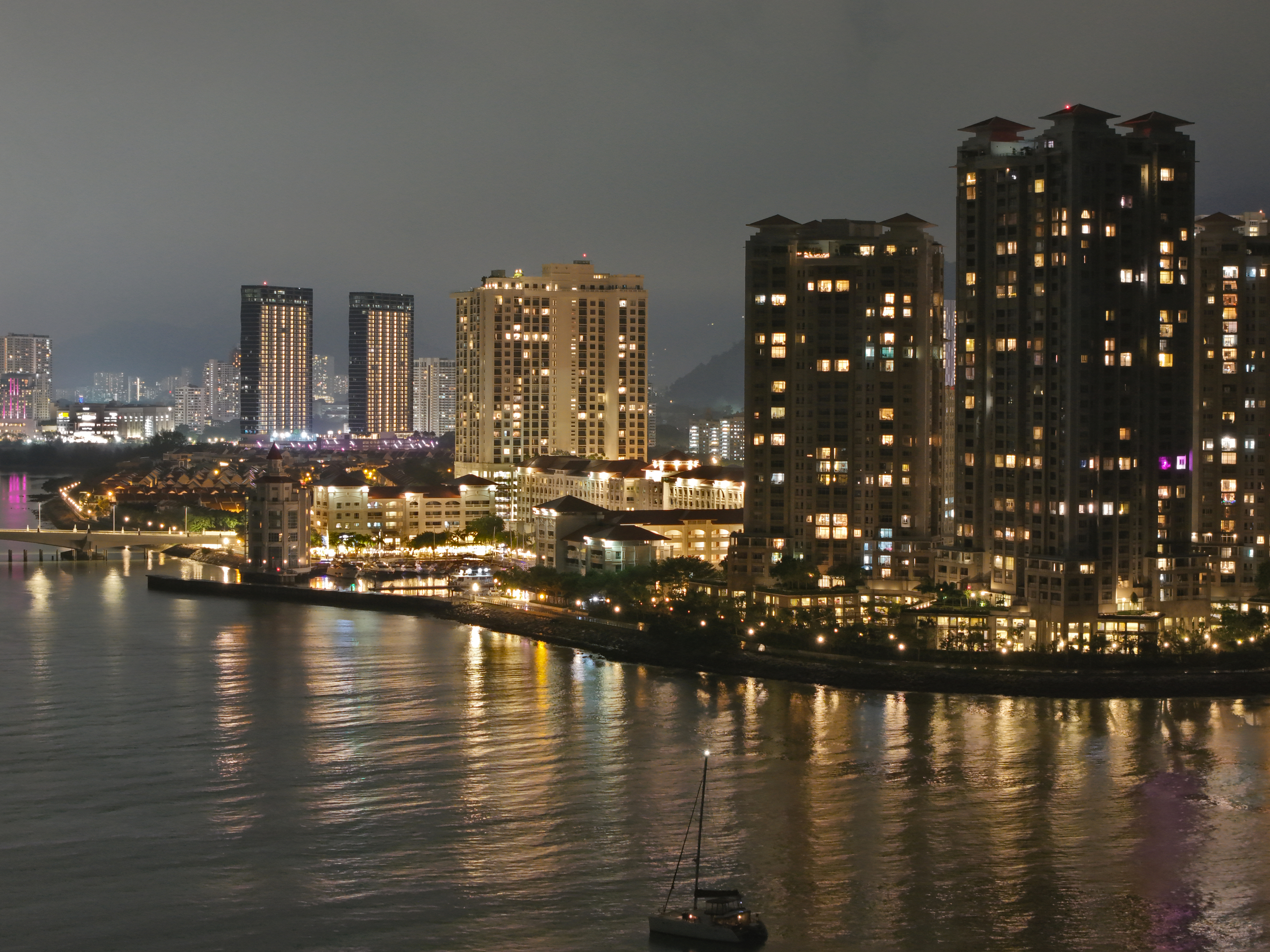

- Location within George Town in Penang
- Coordinates: 5°26′58.65″N 100°18′35.77″E
- Country: Malaysia
- State: Penang
- City: George Town
- District: Northeast
- Founded: 2005

Area
  - Total: 4.5 km^{2} (1.7 sq mi)

Population (2020)
  - Total: 11,970
  - Density: 2,700/km^{2} (6,900/sq mi)

Demographics
  - Ethnic groups: 49.5% Chinese; 23.3% Bumiputera; 23.2% Malay; 0.2% indigenous groups from Sabah and Sarawak; 6.4% Indian; 2.3% Other ethnicities; 18.4% Non-citizens
- Time zone: UTC+8 (MST)
  - Summer (DST): Not observed
- Postal code: 10470

Tanjong Pinang is a suburb within the city of George Town in the Malaysian state of Penang. It lies 4.5 km (2.8 mi) northwest of the city centre and was created on land reclaimed off Tanjong Tokong in the 1990s. The suburb also encompasses Gurney Bay and the ongoing reclamation project of Andaman Island.

== History ==
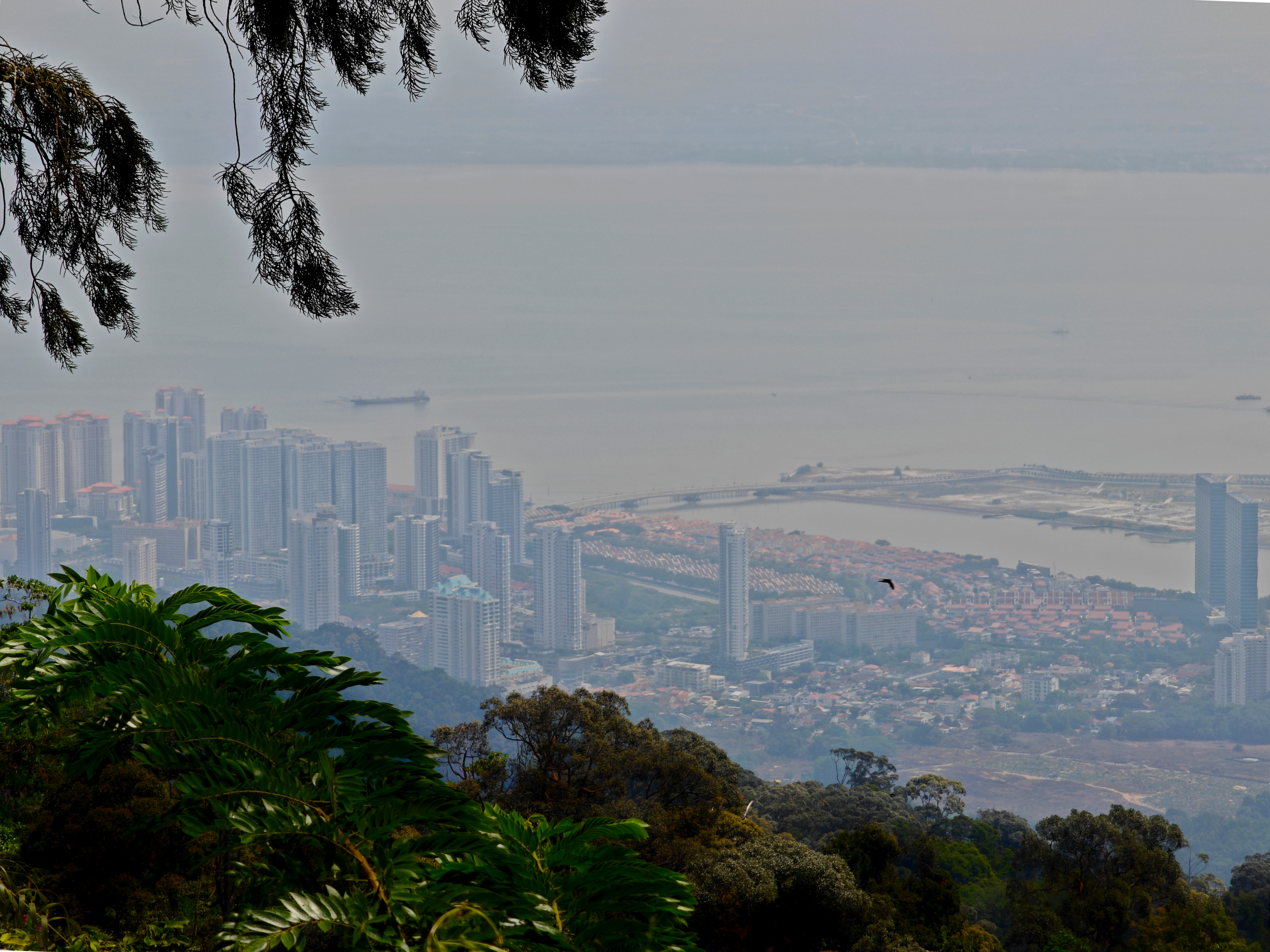
Tanjong Pinang as seen from Penang Hill. Andaman Island is partially visible to the right.

Tanjong Pinang, originally known as Seri Tanjong Pinang, was first mooted in the 1980s, during the tenure of the then Chief Minister of Penang, Lim Chong Eu. The project is split into two phases, with land reclamation for Phase 1 commencing in the 1990s. However, the land reclamation was put on hold following the 1997 Asian financial crisis.

Having acquired the site in 2003, Eastern & Oriental Berhad resumed the development of the first phase. In spite of the increasing costs, the 240-acre (970,000 m^{2}) Seri Tanjong Pinang Phase 1 was completed by 2005.

The second phase of the Seri Tanjong Pinang project began in 2016, involving the reclamation of 760 acres (3,100,000 m^{2}) of land. Simultaneously, work began on the reclamation of Gurney Bay, which was partially opened to public by 2024. In 2019, the first phase of the Andaman Island reclamation was completed. The man-made islet was envisioned as a mixed-use precinct with a gross development value of RM17 billion.

== Geography ==
Map of Tanjong Pinang.
Click link at the top right corner to zoom in.
1 Straits Quay
2 Gurney Bay
3 Andaman Island
4 Jazz Residence
5 City of Dreams
6 Lotus's Jelutong
7 Stonyhurst International School

== Demographics ==
Ethnicities within Tanjong Pinang in 2020
Ethnicities / Nationality	Percentage
Chinese	49.5%
Malays	23.2%
Other Bumiputeras	0.2%
Indians	6.4%
Others	2.3%
Non-Malaysians	18.4%

As of 2020, Tanjong Pinang was home to a population of 11,970. Ethnic Chinese constituted nearly half of the suburb's population, while Malays formed another one-fifth of the population. Tanjong Pinang attracted a sizable expatriate community, which constituted over 18% of the population, followed by the Indians at 6%.

== Education ==
In 2022, Stonyhurst College, a Jesuit private school located in Lancashire, established a sister school at Tanjong Pinang. The school offers a British educational curriculum for students aged three to 18.

== Retail ==
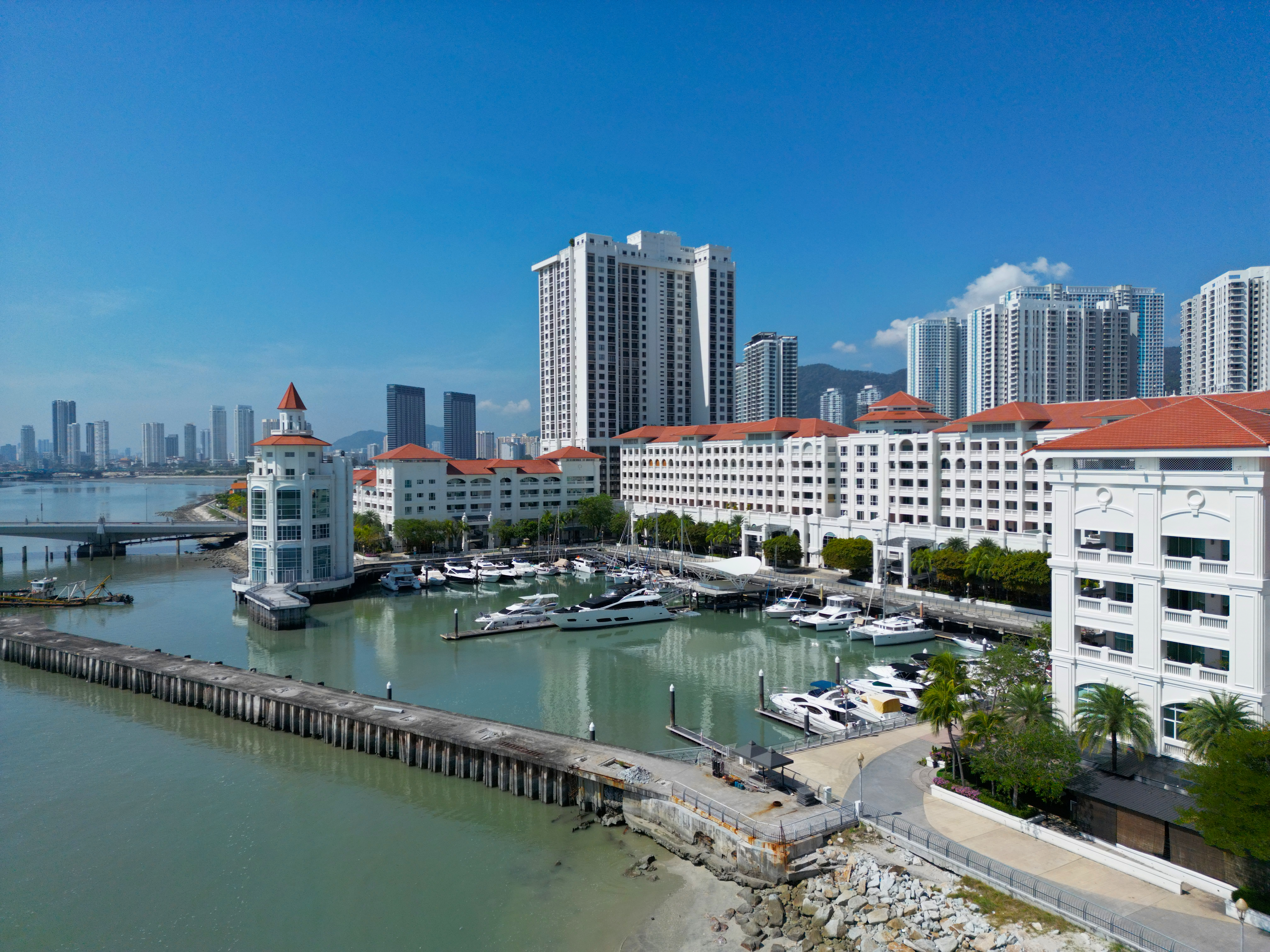
Straits Quay is a marina-cum-shopping mall which also contains a convention centre for business events.

Straits Quay, a marina-cum-shopping mall within the suburb, was completed in 2010. Aside from containing over 100 retail lots, the marina consists of 40 pontoon berths designed to accommodate small recreational boats. The mall also houses the Performing Arts Centre of Penang (Penangpac) and a convention centre.

In addition, a Lotus's (formerly Tesco) hypermarket was launched at the suburb in 2011, making it the third such hypermarket in George Town.

== See also ==
- Bandar Sri Pinang
- The Light Waterfront
