= Malacca Straits Mosque =

Mosque in Malacca City, Malaysia

- Masjid Selat Melaka مسجد سلات ملاك
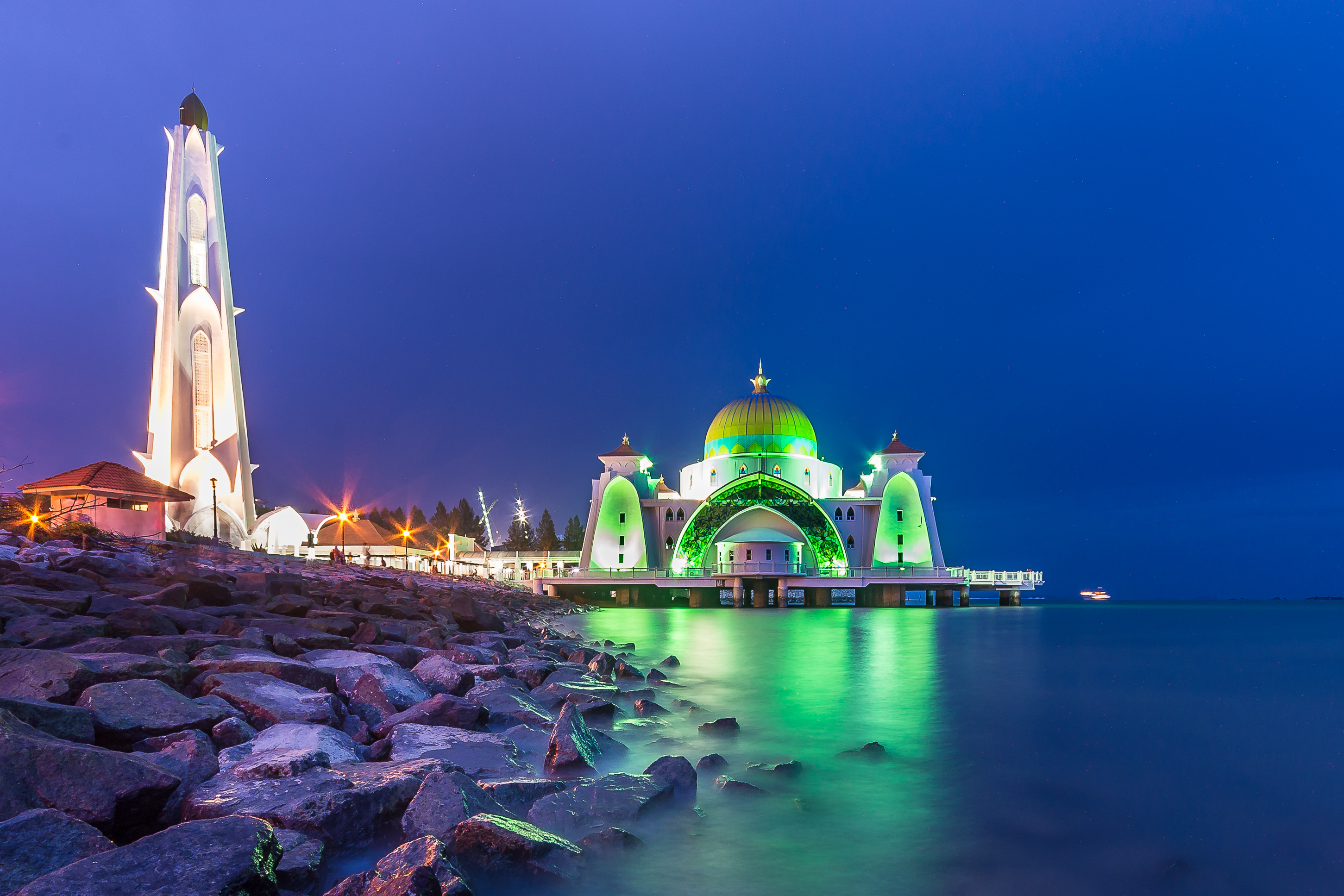

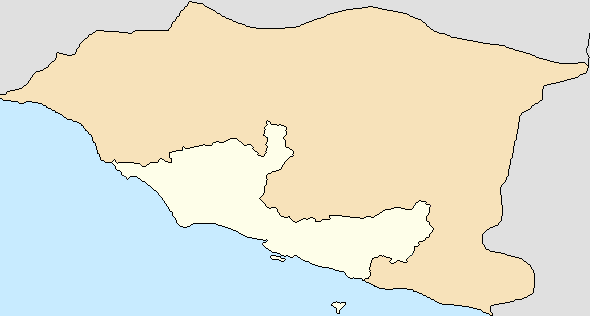
- Location within Malacca City

Religion
- Affiliation: Islam
- Branch/tradition: Sunni

Location
- Location: Malacca Island, Malacca City, Malacca, Malaysia
- Interactive map of Malacca Straits Mosque
- Administration: Malacca Islamic Religious Council
- Coordinates: 2°10′44″N 102°14′57″E

Architecture
- Type: Mosque
- Style: Islamic, Malay
- Established: 24 November 2006

The Malacca Straits Mosque (Malay: Masjid Selat Melaka) is a mosque located on the artificial Malacca Island in Malacca City, Malaysia. Constructed at a cost of about MYR10 million, it was inaugurated on 24 November 2006 by the King of Malaysia, Tuanku Syed Sirajuddin ibni Almarhum Tuanku Syed Putra Jamalullail. It was built using a mix of Middle Eastern and Malay craftsmanship and looks like a floating structure when the water level is high. The mosque has two intersecting archways that lead to the main entrance, and stained glass covers the space in between the arches. The compound has a 30-metre-tall (98 ft) minaret that is also used as a lighthouse.

== See also ==
- Islam in Malaysia
