= Andaman Island, Penang =

Under-construction artificial island in Malaysia

Andaman Island
Native name: Pulau Andaman
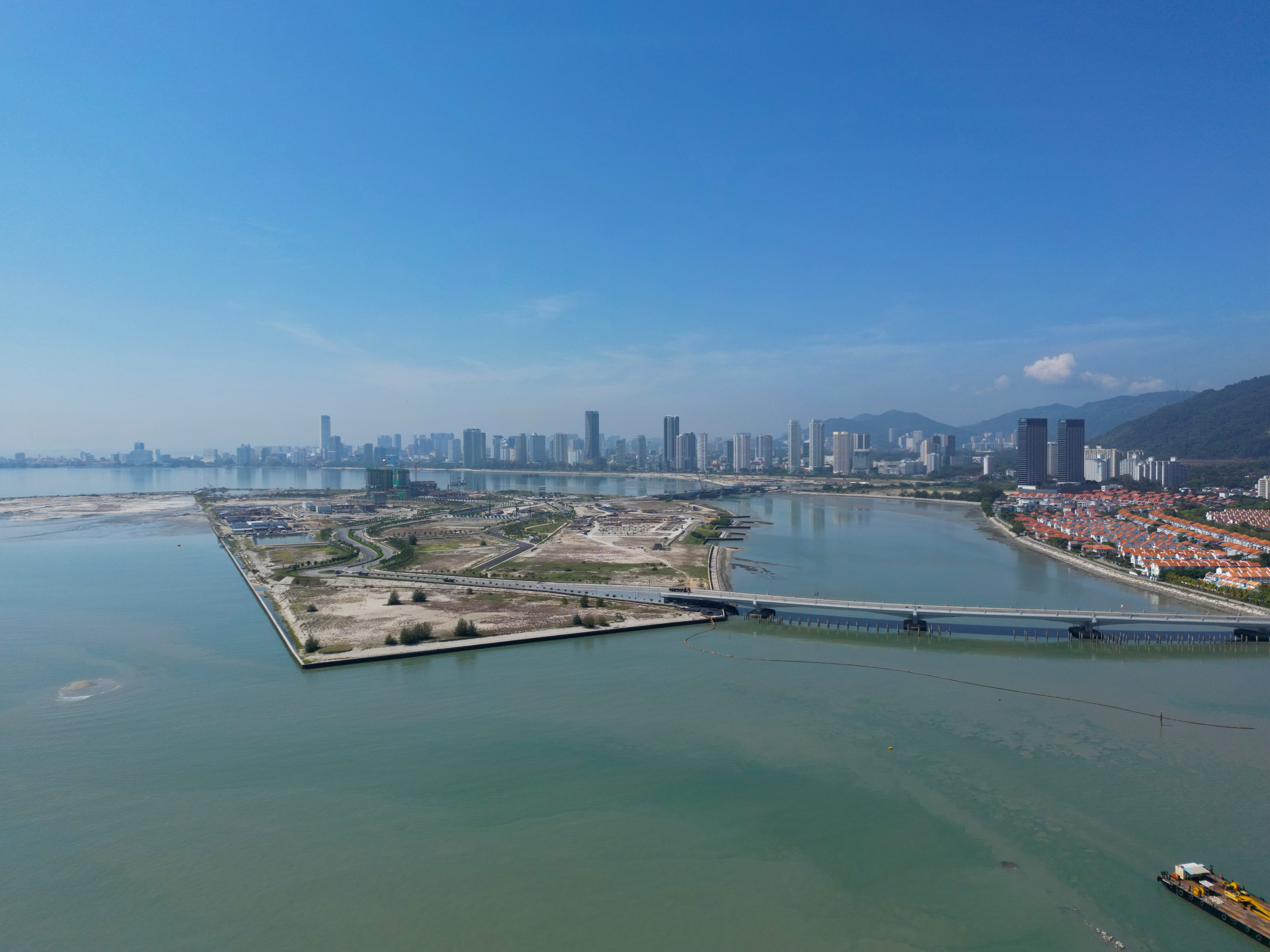

Geography
- Location: Penang Strait
- Coordinates: 5°26′48.5982″N 100°19′9.4614″E
- Area: 3.1 km^{2} (1.2 sq mi)

Administration
- Malaysia
- State: Penang
- City: George Town
- District: Northeast
- Mukim: Tanjong Pinang

Andaman Island is an 760-acre (3.1 km^{2}) artificial island currently under construction off the northeastern coast of Penang Island in the Malaysian state of Penang. It is located 760 m (2,490 ft) off the shoreline of Penang Island and lies within the jurisdiction of George Town.

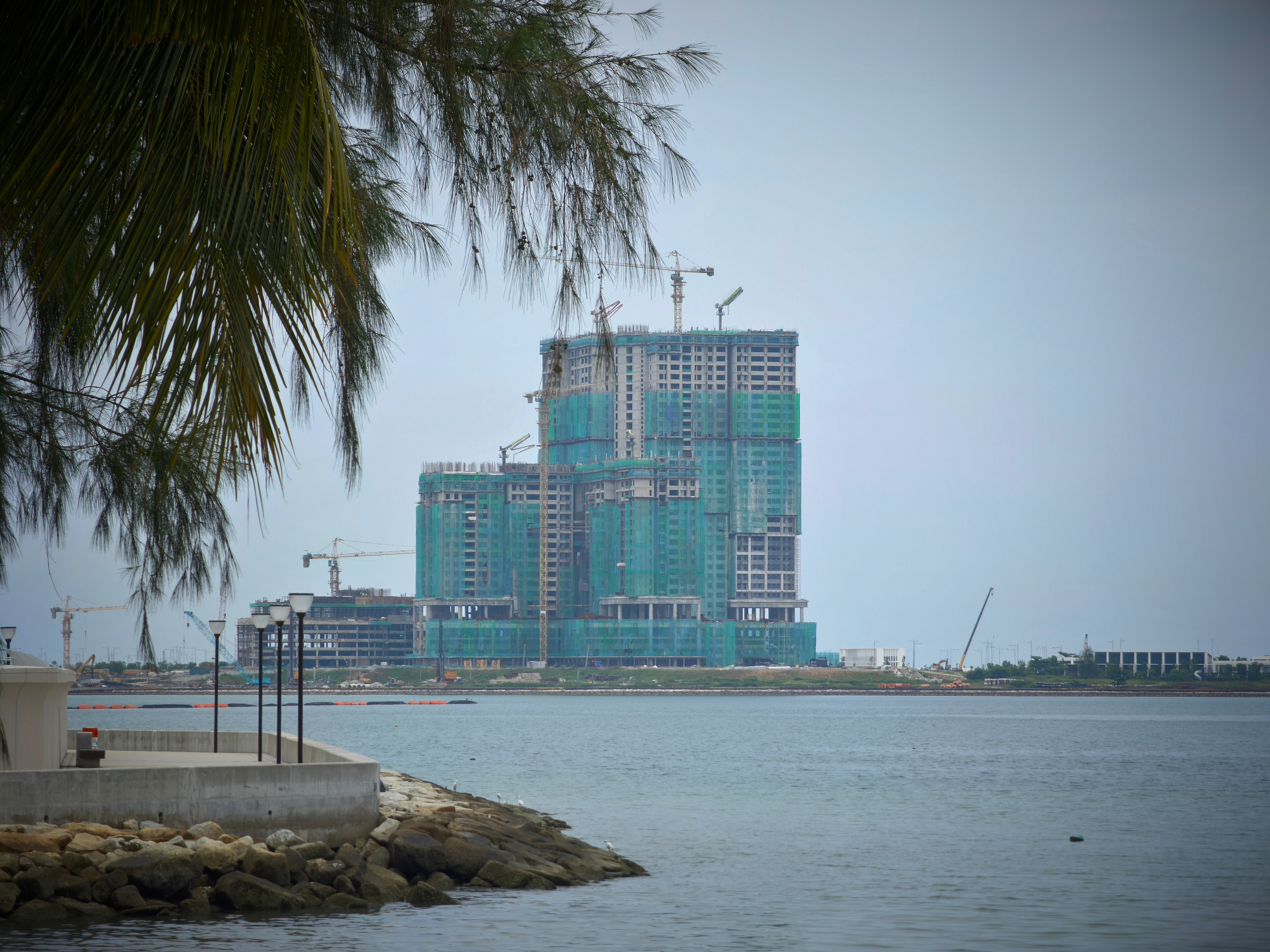
The Meg and Arica, the first properties on Andaman Island, under construction c. 2024.

Andaman Island is being reclaimed by local developer Eastern and Oriental Berhad as an integrated mixed-use precinct with a gross development value of RM17 billion. Phase 1 of the reclamation project was completed in 2019, paving the way for the construction of The Meg and Arica, both of which are the first residential properties on the islet. As of 2023, the islet is connected to Tanjong Pinang via a road bridge, while a second bridge between the islet and Gurney Drive is under construction.

In 2024, Eastern and Oriental Berhad unveiled a RM60 billion masterplan that encompasses three segments of the island – the Shoreline, Gurney Green and the Canalside. Development of these segments is projected to be completed by 2030. Proposals have also been made to designate Andaman Island as a special economic zone.

== See also ==
- Silicon Island
- List of islands of Malaysia
