= Taman Kota Laksamana =

Suburb in Malacca, Malaysia

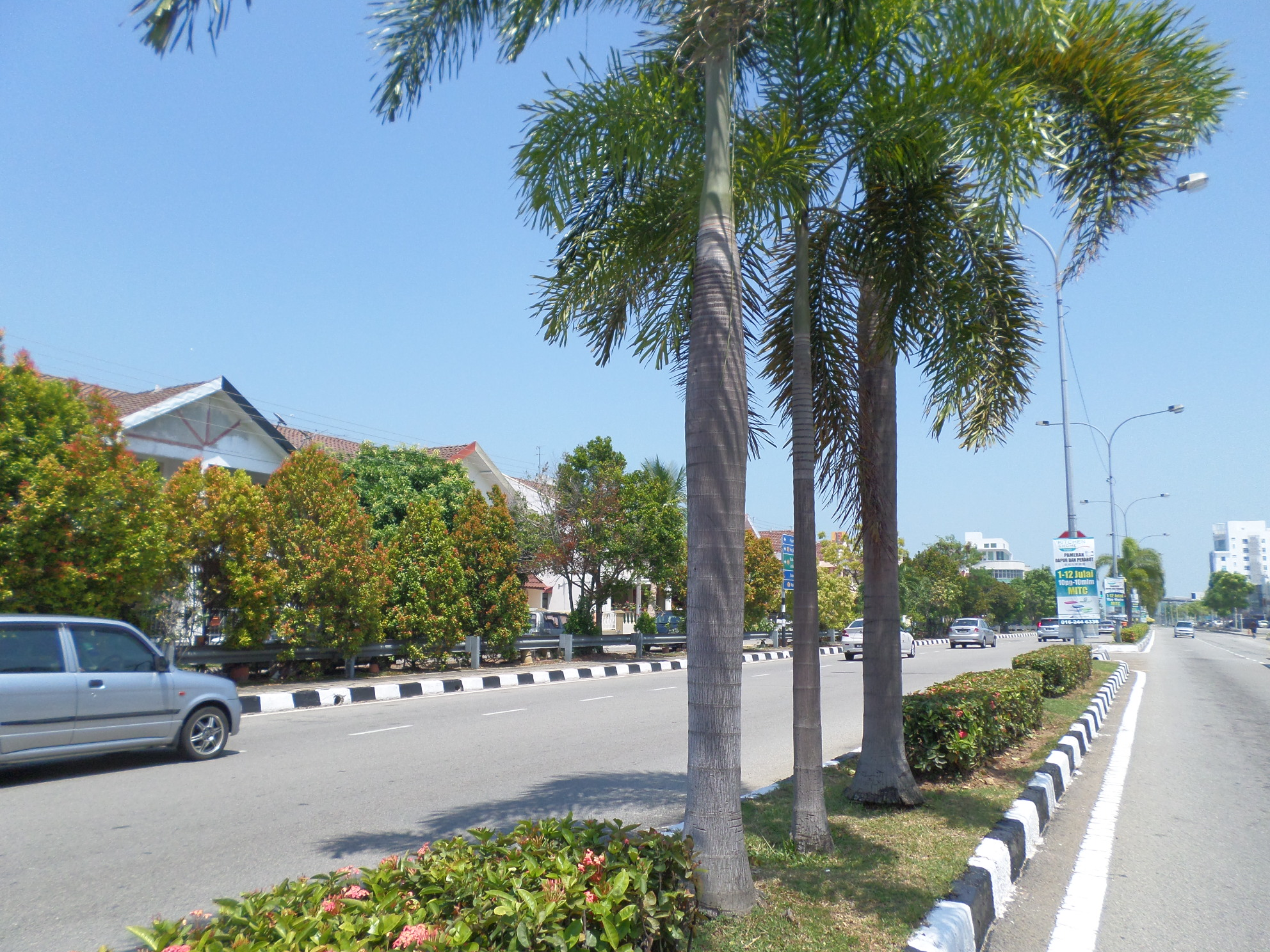
Taman Kota Laksamana

Taman Kota Laksamana is one of a few residential areas and business districts located on reclaimed land in Malacca City, the capital city of the Malaysian state of Malacca. Impression City Melaka, a 138-acre integrated mixed development area which includes the state of the art Encore Melaka theatre, is located in this residential area.
