= Malacca River =

River in Melaka, Malaysia

Coordinates: 2°12′N 102°15′E

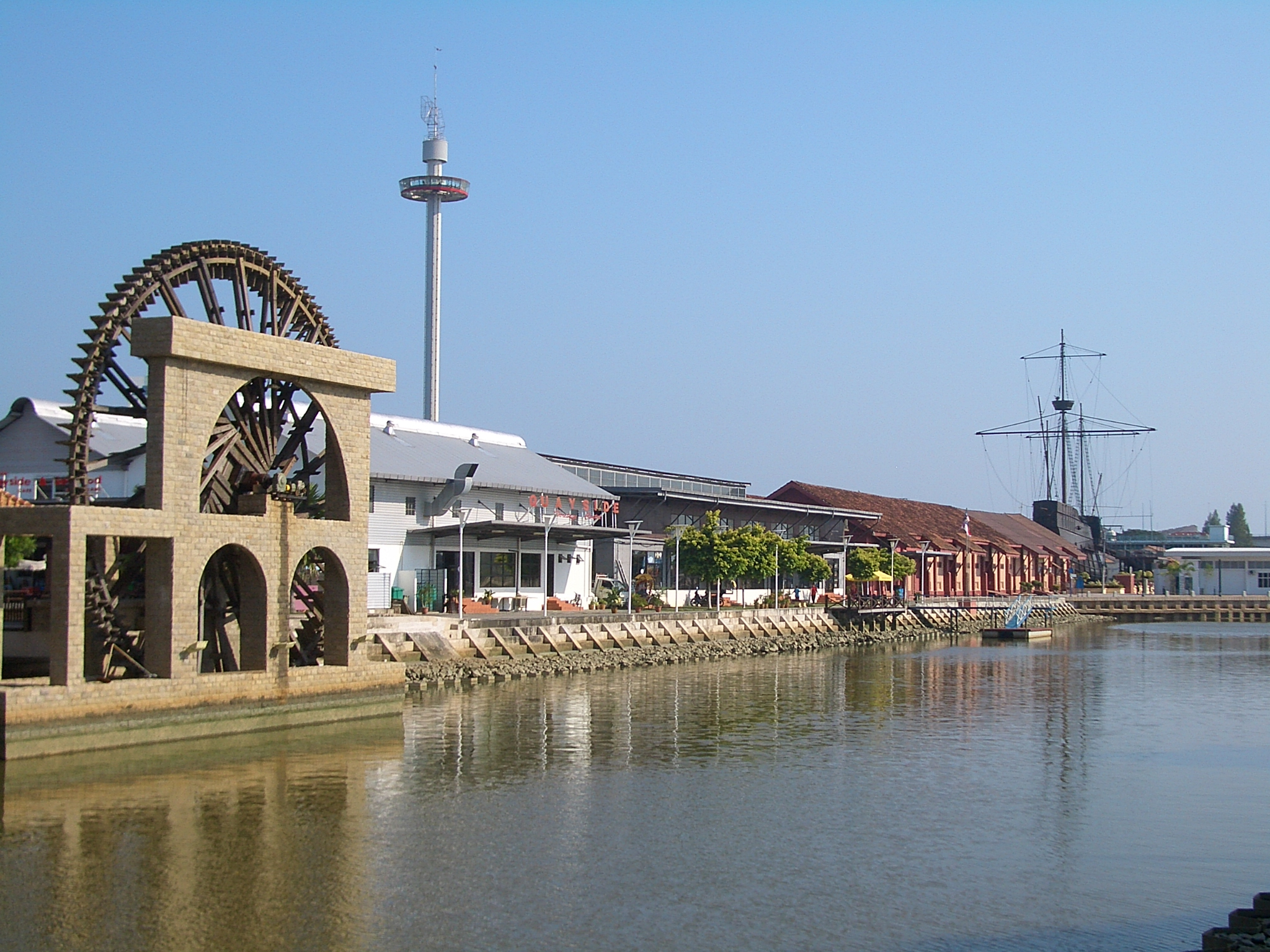
- Native name: Sungai Melaka (Malay)

Physical characteristics
- Source: Tampin River
  - location: Kampung Orek, Tampin District, Negeri Sembilan
- 2nd source: Batang Melaka River
  - location: Batang Melaka, Jasin District, Malacca
- Source confluence
  - location: Gadek, Alor Gajah District, Malacca
- Mouth: Strait of Malacca
  - location: Malacca City, Melaka Tengah District, Malacca

The Malacca River (Malay: Sungai Melaka) is a river in Malaysia which flows through the middle of the state of Malacca. It was a vital trade route during the heyday of Malacca Sultanate in the 15th century.

== Course ==
The river starts from the southern end of the Titiwangsa Mountains in the neighbouring state of Negeri Sembilan, at Kampung Orek, Tampin District as the Tampin River which flows south, almost parallel to the Karak-Tampin trunk road (Federal Route FT 9) until Tampin and Pulau Sebang, the latter is beyond the Negeri Sembilan-Malacca border. At Gadek in Alor Gajah District, the Batang Melaka River merges with the Tampin to form the Malacca River and it feeds into the Strait of Malacca.

== Rejuvenation plans ==
A USD$100 million (RM350 million) infrastructure project to revive and rejuvenate the river which is the central to Malacca as a historical city was carried out. This included construction of a tidal barrage, restoration of buildings and bridges, dredging, and building concrete river banks with river walkways. Land reclamation projects have extended the river mouth further into the Straits.

== Tourism ==
The Malacca River, near its mouth, flows in the middle of Malacca City, a World Heritage Site. This section of the river was developed as a tourist attraction in the city as the Malacca River Cruise, where tourists would hop on a boat and embark on a 45-minute sightseeing tour of the city and its historic core as it cruises along the river, from Pengkalan Rama in the east to Downtown Malacca City near the coast of the Strait of Malacca.

== See also ==
- Geography of Malaysia
- List of rivers of Malaysia
- Muar River
