= Mahkota Parade =

Shopping mall in Malacca City, Malacca, Malaysia

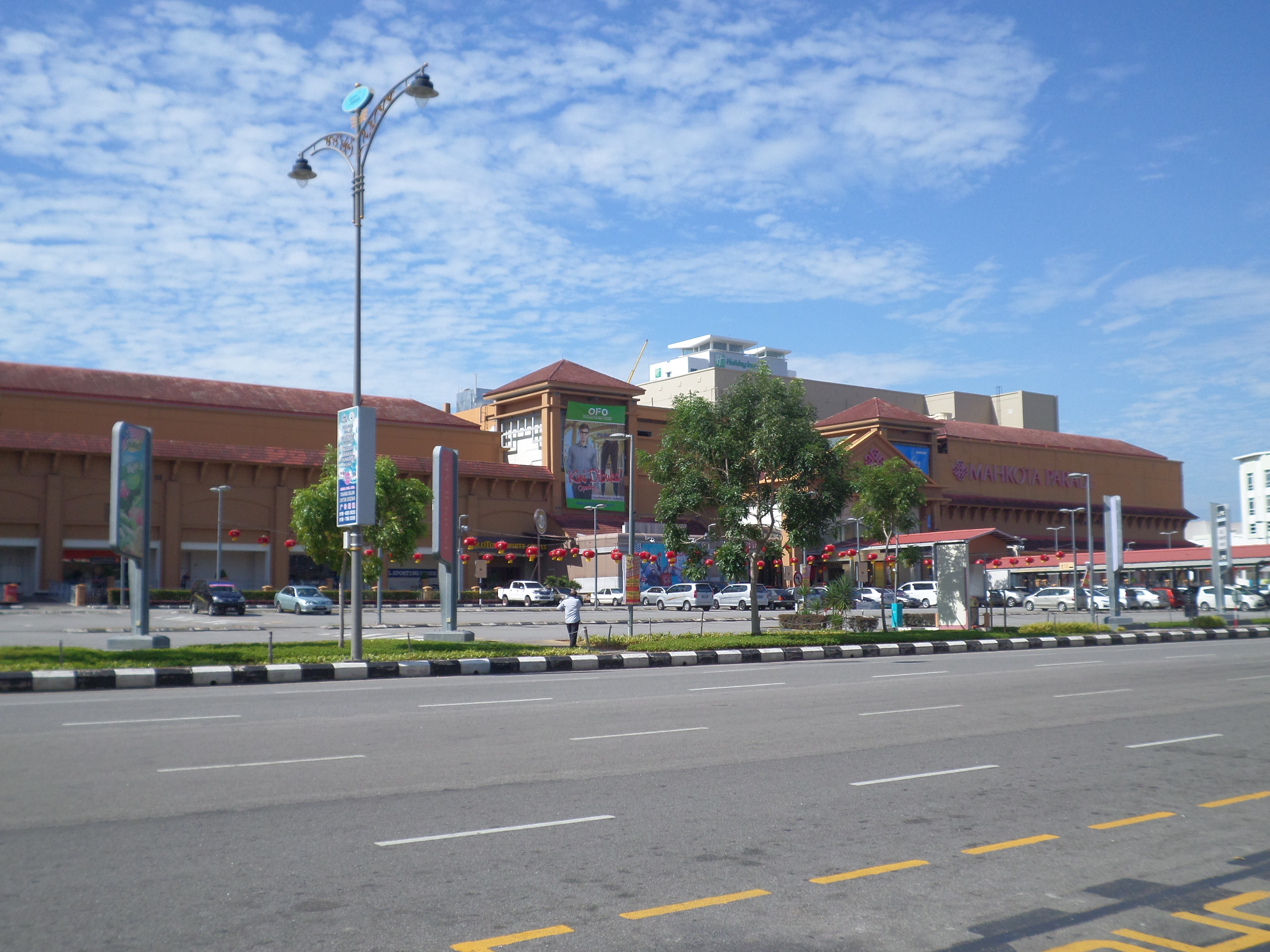
- External view of Mahkota Parade from the adjacent Dataran Pahlawan Melaka Megamall along Jalan Merdeka.
- Location: Malacca City, Malacca, Malaysia
- Coordinates: 2°11′30.5″N 102°14′47.2″E
- Opened: 30 January 1994
- Manager: Hektar Property Services
- Owner: Hektar REIT
- Floor area: 50,000 m^{2}
- Floors: 4
- Website: www.mahkotaparade.com.my

Mahkota (Crown) Parade is a shopping mall located in Malacca City, Malacca, Malaysia, which was officially opened on 30 January 1994 and relaunched on 1 May 2010 after refurbishment. It was acquired by Hektar REIT (Real Estate Investment Trust) in 2006 and became one of its shopping centres, alongside Kulim Central and Central Square in Kedah, Wetex Parade and Segamat Central in Johor, and Subang Parade in Selangor. The mall was part of the 32 hectares Mahkota Melaka (Malacca Crown) Seafront Township Project undertaken by The Lion Group in the 1990s, and like its surrounding buildings including the nearby Costa Mahkota Serviced Apartment, is built on reclaimed land.

The mall building has a gross floor area of 1,392,632 square feet (129,379.7 m^{2}) with a Net Lettable Area of 519,542 square feet (48,267.0 m^{2}) with almost 200 stores spanning over 4 floors. It has more than 1,000 parking spaces.

It houses stores of international brands like Innisfree and Guardian, along with food-and-beverages outlets like Starbucks and Tony Roma's, also entertainment centers, 10 Screen MM cineplexes, Ampang Super Bowl, karaoke etc.

== See also ==
- Dataran Pahlawan Melaka Megamall – the adjacent shopping mall
- List of shopping malls in Malaysia
