= List of museums in Malaysia =

This is a list of museums in Malaysia.

== Johor ==
- Bugis Museum
- Bukit Kepong Emergency Gallery
- Johor Figure Museum
- Johor Bahru Chinese Heritage Museum
- Kite Museum
- Kota Johor Lama Museum
- Kota Tinggi Museum
- Mersing Museum
- Pineapple Museum (Temporarily closed)
- Tanjung Balau Fishermen Museum
- The Royal Abu Bakar Museum (Temporarily closed)

== Kedah ==
- Bujang Valley Archaeological Museum
- Galeria Perdana (Temporarily closed)
- Kedah State Forestry Museum
- Kedah State Museum
- Kedah Royal Museum
- Kota Kuala Kedah Museum
- Sultan Abdul Halim Mu'adzam Shah Gallery
- Paddy Museum

== Kelantan ==
- Bank Kerapu Second World War Memorial
- Istana Batu Royal Museum
- Museum of Royal Traditions and Customs
- Kelantan Islamic Museum | Temporarily closed
- Kelantan State Museum
- Wau Museum

== Kuala Lumpur ==
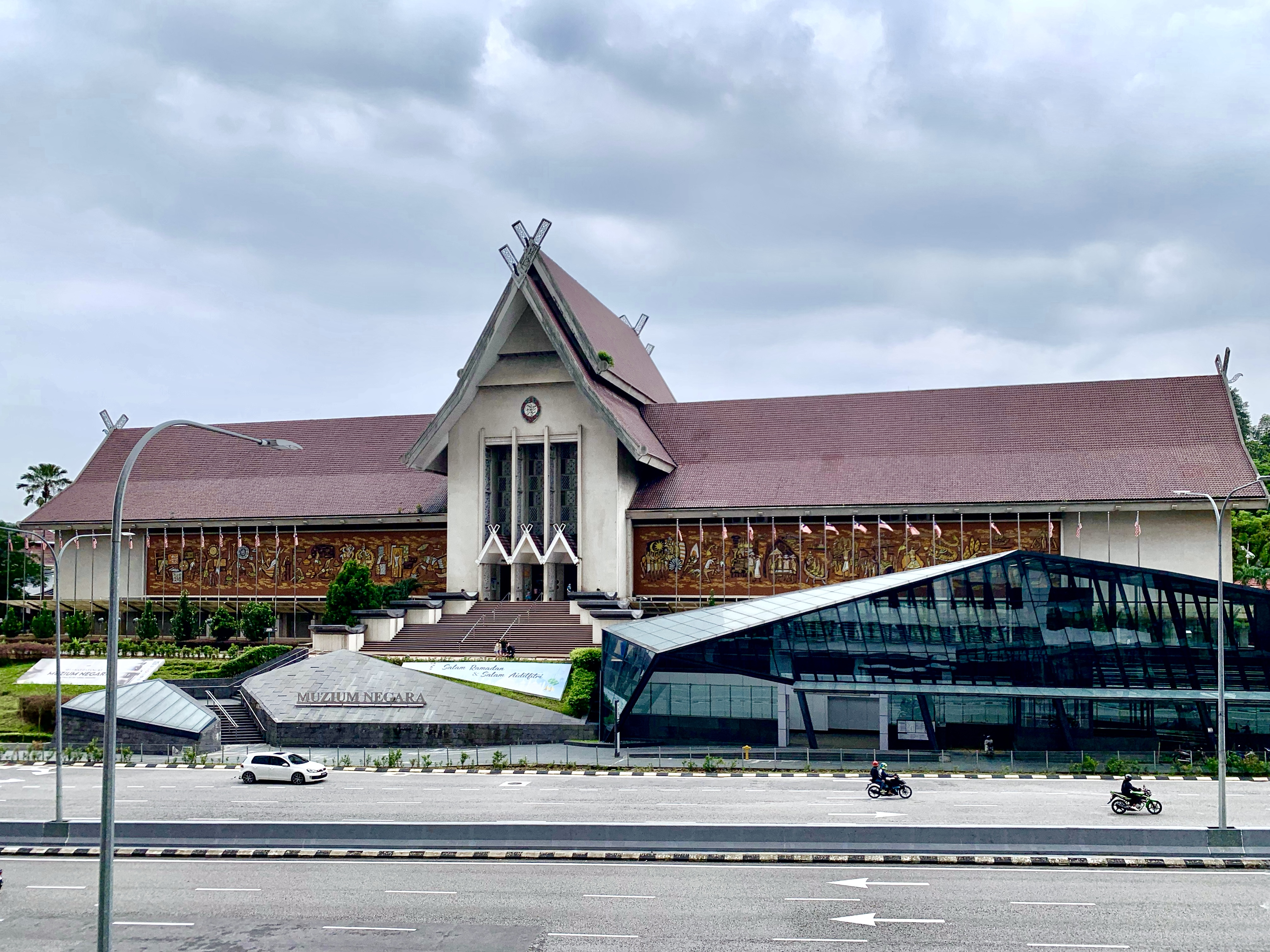
National Museum

- Bank Negara Malaysia Museum and Art Gallery
- Biomedical Museum
- Islamic Arts Museum Malaysia
- Malay World Ethnology Museum
- Maybank Numismatic Museum (Temporarily closed)
- Merdeka Textile Museum
- Museum of Asian Art
- National History Museum
- National Museum
- National Textile Museum
- Orang Asli Craft Museum
- Royal Malaysian Police Museum
- Royal Museum (Temporarily closed)
- Sze Si Ya Temple Pioneers of Kuala Lumpur Museum
- Telekom Museum

== Labuan ==
- Chimney Museum
- Labuan Maritime Museum
- Labuan Museum
- Labia Museum of Malaysia

== Malacca ==
- Malacca Museum Corporation (Malay: Perbadanan Muzium Melaka, PERZIM)
  - Aborigines Museum
  - Agricultural Museum
- Beauty Museum
- Chitty Museum
- Democratic Government Museum
- Education Museum
- Governor's Museum
- History and Ethnography Museum
- Kite Museum
- Melaka Al-Quran Museum
- Malacca Bee Gallery
- Melaka Forestry Museum
- Melaka Islamic Museum
- Melaka Literature Museum
- Melaka Stamp Museum
- Melaka Sultanate Palace Museum
- Malay and Islamic World Museum
- Malaysia Architecture Museum
- Malaysia Prison Museum
- Malaysia Youth Museum
- Maritime Museum
- People's Museum
- Royal Malaysian Customs Department Museum
- Royal Malaysian Navy Museum
- Submarine Museum
- Baba Nyonya Heritage Museum
- Cheng Ho Cultural Museum
- Melaka UMNO Museum
- Straits Chinese Jewellery Museum
- Toy Museum
- Proclamation of Independence Memorial

== Negeri Sembilan ==
- Army Museum
- Custom Museum
- Lukut Fort and Museum
- Negeri Sembilan State Museum
- Rembau Museum
- Seri Menanti Royal Museum (Temporarily closed)

== Pahang ==
- Sultan Abu Bakar Museum
- Sungai Lembing Museum
- Time Tunnel Museum
- Warisan Lipis Museum

== Penang ==
- Batik Painting Museum Penang
- Camera Museum
- Guar Kepah Archaeological Gallery
- Pulau Pinang (Penang Ferry Museum)
- Penang Colonial Museum
- Penang Indian Heritage Museum
- Penang Museum and Art Gallery (Temporarily closed)
- Penang War Museum
- Straits & Oriental Museum
- Sun Yat-sen Museum Penang

== Perak ==
- Beruas Museum
- Darul Ridzuan Museum
- Geological Museum (Malaysia)
- Han Chin Pet Soo, Hakka Tin Mining Museum
- Kota Ngah Ibrahim
- Palong Tin Museum
- Perak Royal Museum
- Perak State Museum
- Sitiawan Settlement Museum

== Perlis ==
- Arau Royal Gallery
- Kota Kayang Museum

== Sabah ==
- Agnes Keith House
- Keningau Heritage Museum
- Mat Sator Museum
- Pogunon Community Museum
- Sabah Islamic Civilisation Museum
- Sabah Museum
- Sandakan Heritage Museum
- Tun Sakaran Museum

== Sarawak ==
- Baram Regional Museum
- Borneo Cultures Museum
- Brooke Gallery
- Chinese History Museum
- Islamic Heritage Museum
- Kapit Museum
- Kuching Cat Museum
- Lau King Howe Hospital Memorial Museum
- Limbang Museum
- Niah Archeology Museum
- Petroleum Museum
- Sarawak State Museum
- Sibu Heritage Centre
- Sri Aman Heritage Museum
- Textile Museum Sarawak

== Selangor ==
- Malay Heritage Museum
- Orang Asli Museum
- Petaling Jaya Museum
- Sultan Abdul Aziz Royal Gallery
- Sultan Alam Shah Museum
- Jugra Insitu Museum
- Kuala Selangor District Historical Museum
- Malaysian Chinese Museum
- Museum of Traditional Games
- National Automobile Museum
- Sabak Bernam District Museum

== Terengganu ==
- Terengganu State Museum

== See also ==
- List of museums
- Tourism in Malaysia
- List of tourist attractions in Malaysia
- Culture of Malaysia
