= Sabah Islamic Civilisation Museum =

Museum in Kota Kinabalu, Sabah, Malaysia

- Muzium Tamadun Islam Sabah
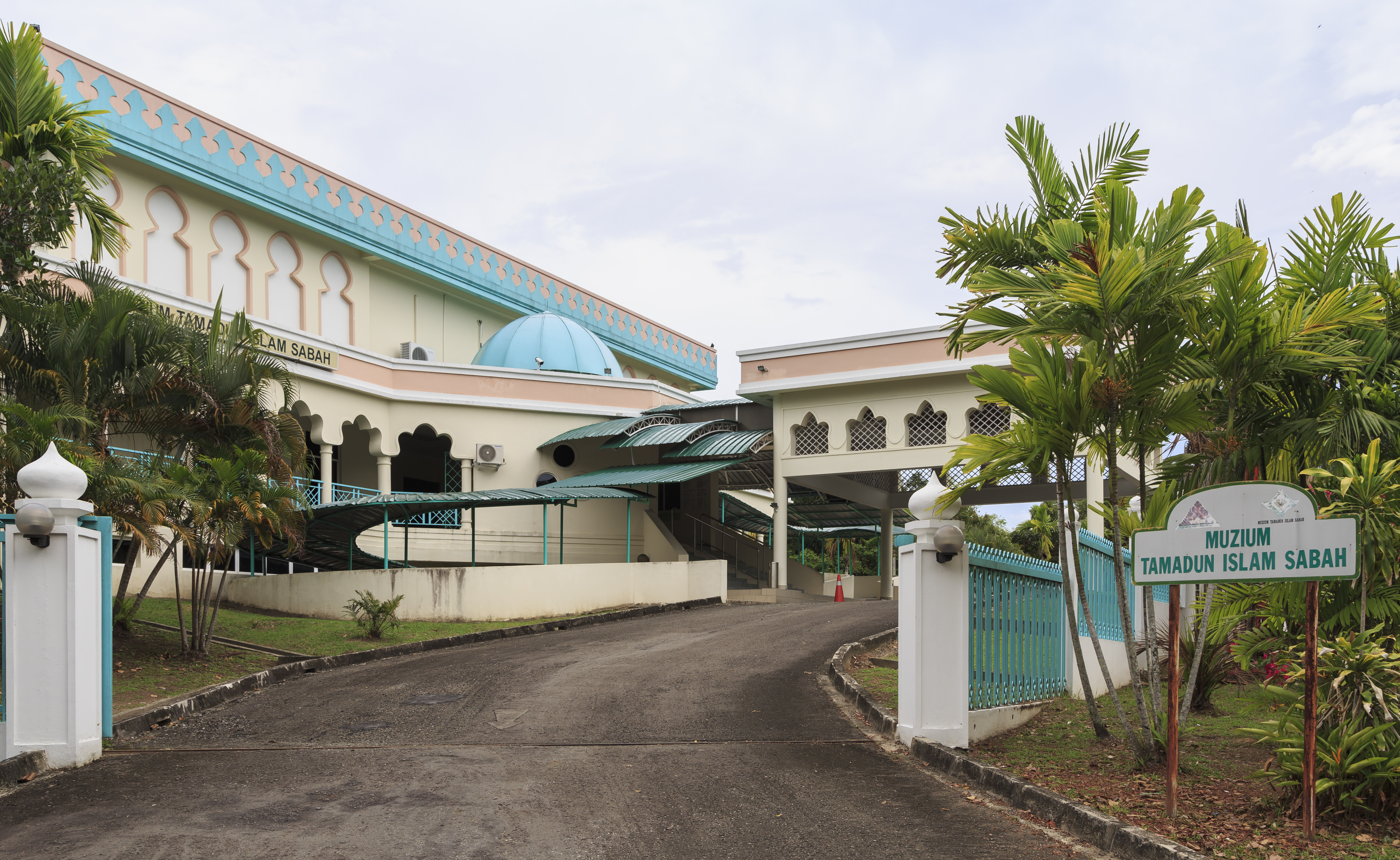
- Established: 5 April 2002
- Location: Kota Kinabalu District, Sabah
- Coordinates: 5°57′48″N 116°04′26″E
- Type: museum
- Owner: Sabah Museum

Sabah Islamic Civilisation Museum (Malay: Muzium Tamadun Islam Sabah) is a 2-storey museum building located at Menteri Street in Kota Kinabalu District of Sabah, Malaysia.

== History ==
The museum opening is officiated by the 8th Yang di-Pertua Negeri of Sabah, Sakaran Dandai on 5 April 2002.

== Features ==
The museum exhibits the history of the spread of Islamic religion in Southeast Asia including the roots of its arrival into Sabah and Malaysia as a whole. The first ground floor featuring an Islamic World Gallery with ancient Islamic artefacts brought from Middle East countries such as Turkey, Egypt, Iran, Morocco and India. Apart from the Islamic World Gallery, a Borneo Gallery also features in the same floor where dozens of Islamic antique from Sabah and neighbouring Sarawak and Brunei being featured.

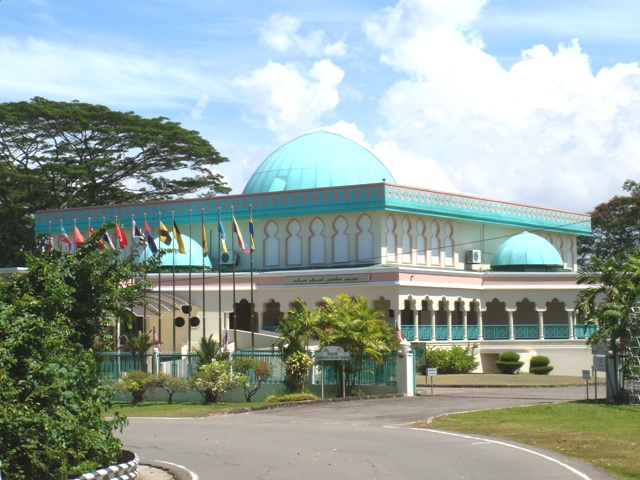
The museum building as seen from outside.

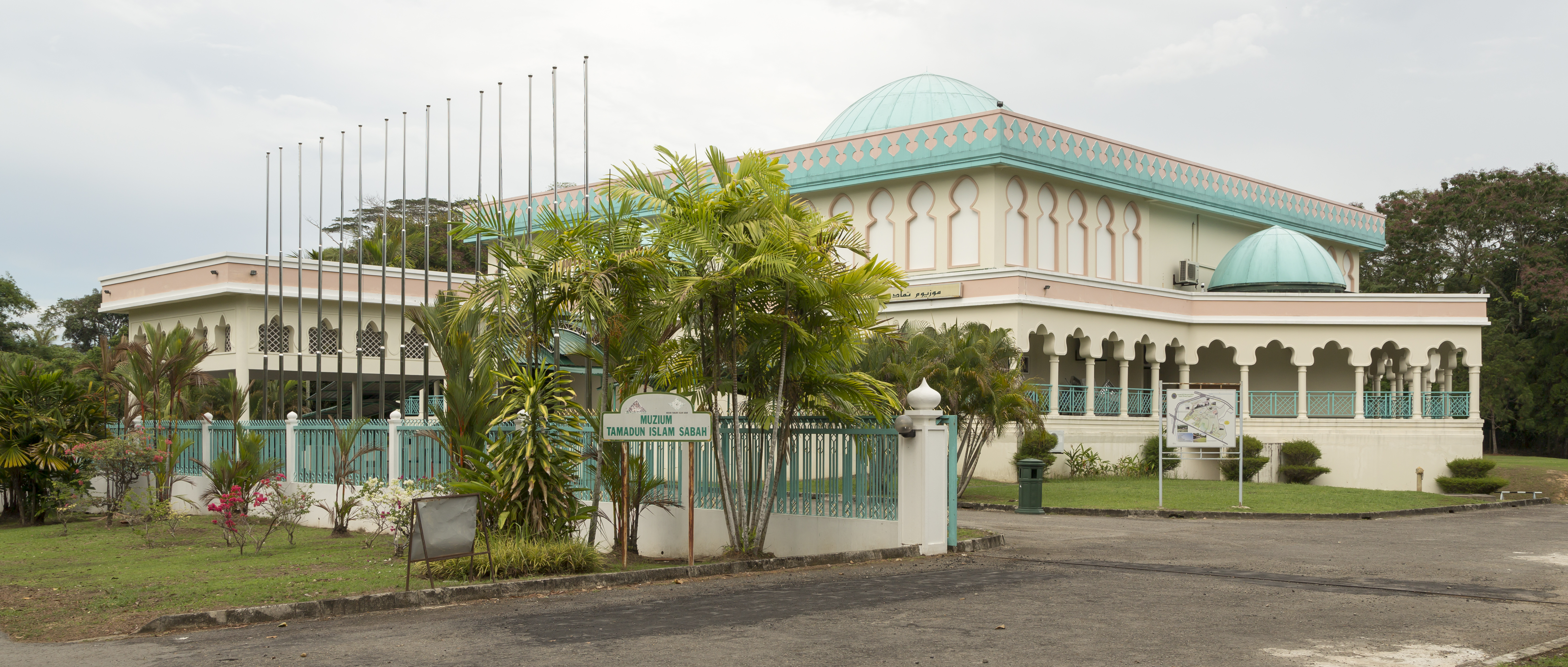
The building seen from the entrance gate.

== See also ==
- List of museums in Malaysia
