= Malacca Al-Quran Museum =

Museum in Malacca City, Malacca, Malaysia

- Muzium Al-Quran Melaka
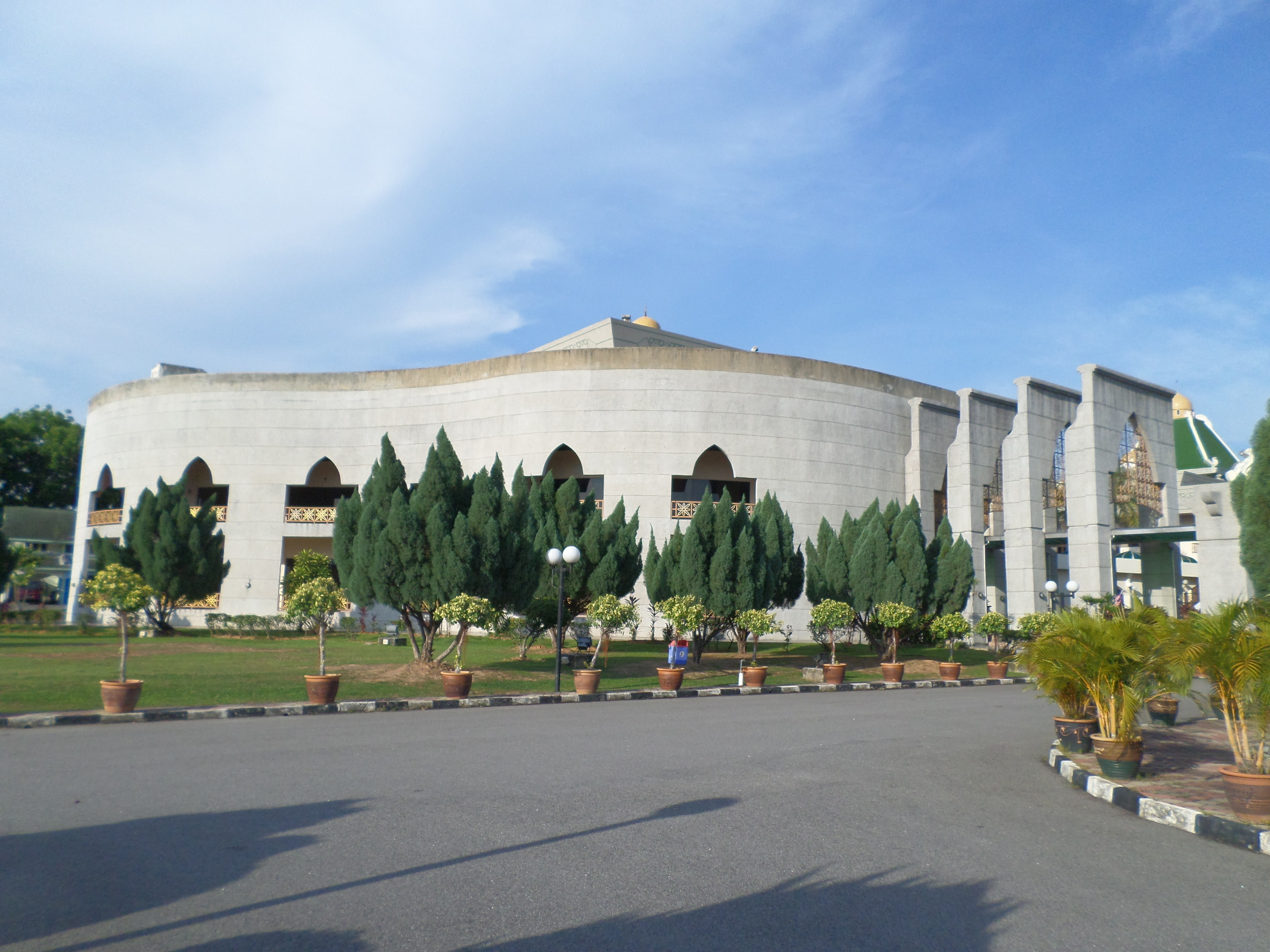
- Established: 10 January 2008
- Location: Malacca City, Malacca, Malaysia
- Coordinates: 2°13′N 102°16′E
- Type: museum

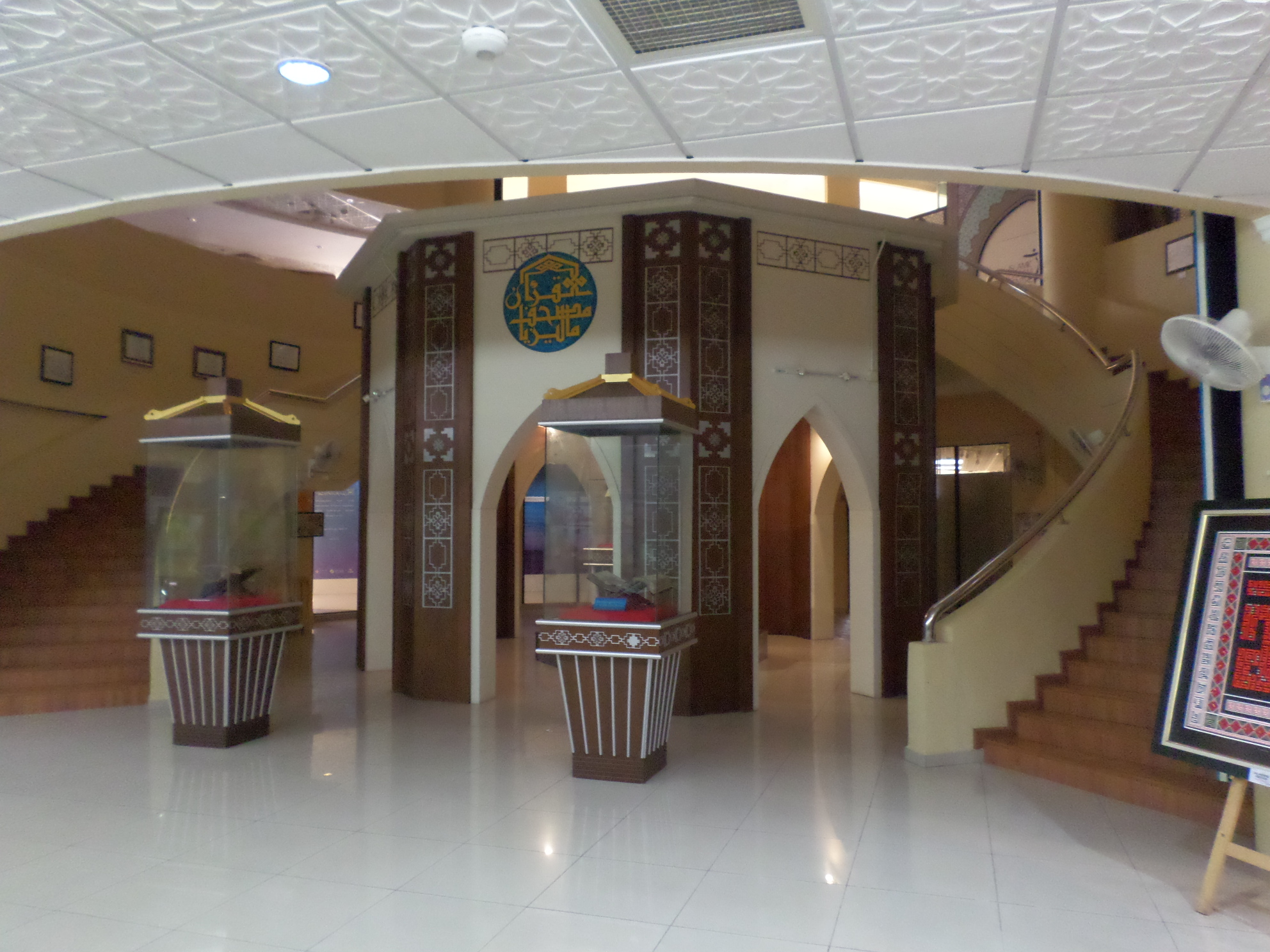
Malacca Al-Quran Museum exhibition hall

Malacca Al-Quran Museum (Malay: Muzium Al-quran Melaka) is a museum about Quran in Malacca City, Malacca, Malaysia, which was developed with the cooperation between Restu Foundation and Malacca State Government and opened to the public on 10 January 2008. It is located next to the state mosque of Malacca and consists of 12 main halls and a shop.

The museum exhibits various collections of the Quran, ranging from old manuscripts, special collections to arts, as well as the history of the spread of Islam from the divine revelation during Prophet Muhammad time and his close friends throughout the Middle East, Indochina and the rest of the Malay world.

== See also ==
- List of museums in Malaysia
- List of tourist attractions in Malacca
