= Malay and Islamic World Museum =

Museum in Malacca City, Malacca, Malaysia

- Muzium Dunia Melayu Dunia Islam
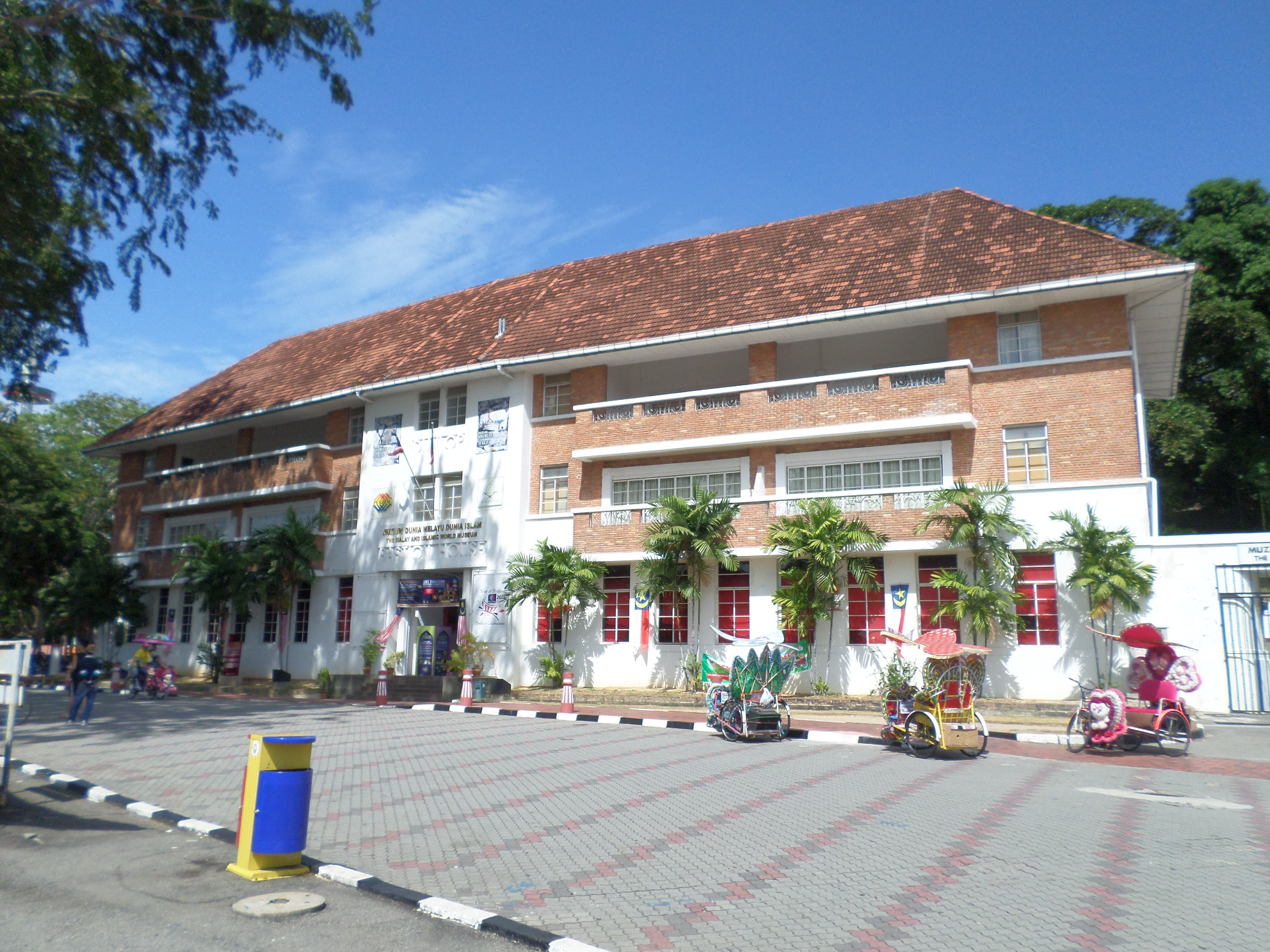
- Established: October 2012
- Location: Malacca City, Malacca, Malaysia
- Coordinates: 2°11′29.9″N 102°14′59.5″E
- Type: museum

The Malay and Islamic World Museum (Malay: Muzium Dunia Melayu Dunia Islam) is a museum about Malay and Islamic cultures in Malacca City, Malacca, Malaysia. It is housed in the Bastion House building which was built in 1910 and occupied by the British rubber company Dunlop until 1986. The building has the English architectural elements, the rectangular shape design with deep slanted roofs. The museum displays the information about the spread of Islam in the world, important and historical Malay and Muslim figures, important Islamic buildings, artifacts, traditional dress etc.

== See also ==
- List of museums in Malaysia
- List of tourist attractions in Malacca
