= Royal Malaysian Navy Museum =

Museum in Melaka Tengah, Malacca, Malaysia

- Muzium Tentera Laut Diraja Malaysia
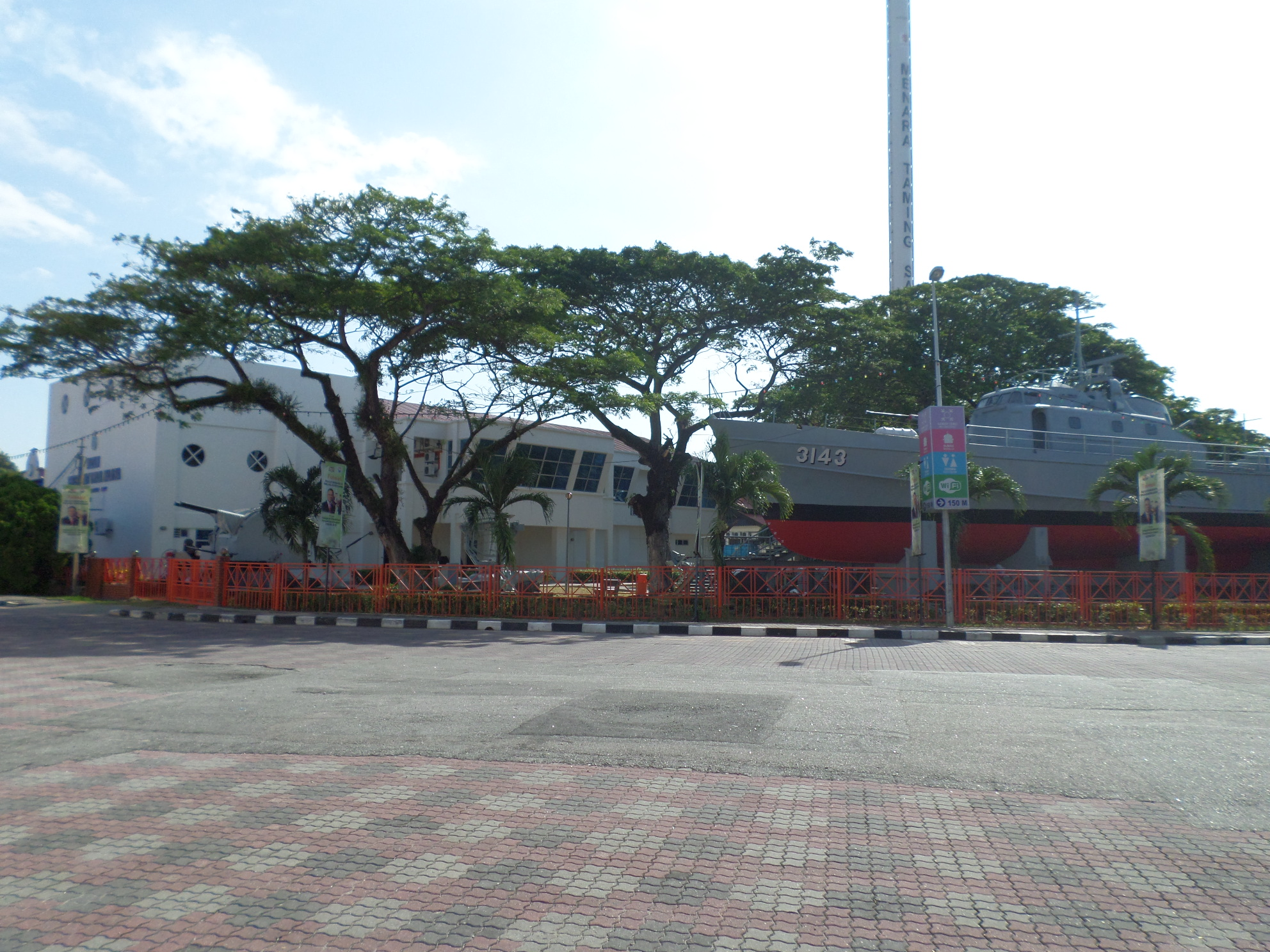
- Established: 28 October 1995; 30 years ago
- Location: Malacca City, Malacca, Malaysia
- Coordinates: 2°11′28.2″N 102°14′47.9″E
- Type: museum
- Owner: Malacca Museum Corporation (with cooperation from the Royal Malaysian Navy)

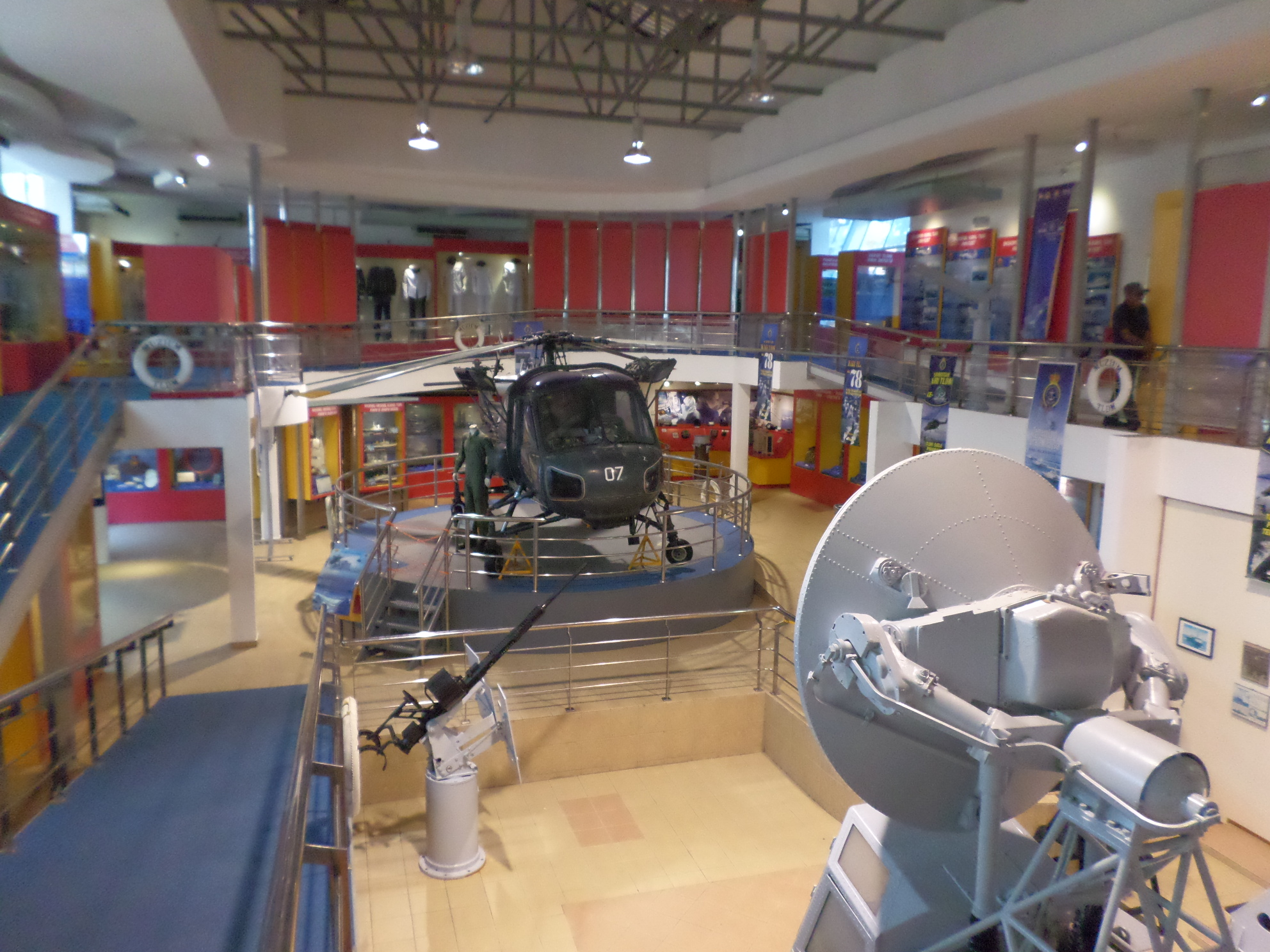
Royal Malaysian Navy Museum exhibition hall

Royal Malaysian Navy Museum (Malay: Muzium Tentera Laut Diraja Malaysia) is a museum which exhibits items used by the Royal Malaysian Navy in Malacca City, Malacca, Malaysia. Exhibits included photos of admirals, medals of honor, as well as information about the various ranks in the naval command, evolution of naval uniforms, naval weapons, communication equipment, navigation symbols and training programs.

The museum was formerly located at Royal Malaysian Naval Base in Lumut, Perak. It was then relocated to Malacca to take the advantage of the larger number of tourists, both local and foreign visitors. The new location of the naval museum was opened to the public on 28 October 1995.

== See also ==
- List of museums in Malaysia
- List of tourist attractions in Malacca
