= Batik Painting Museum Penang =

Museum in Northeast, Penang, Malaysia

- Muzium Lukisan Batik Pulau Pinang
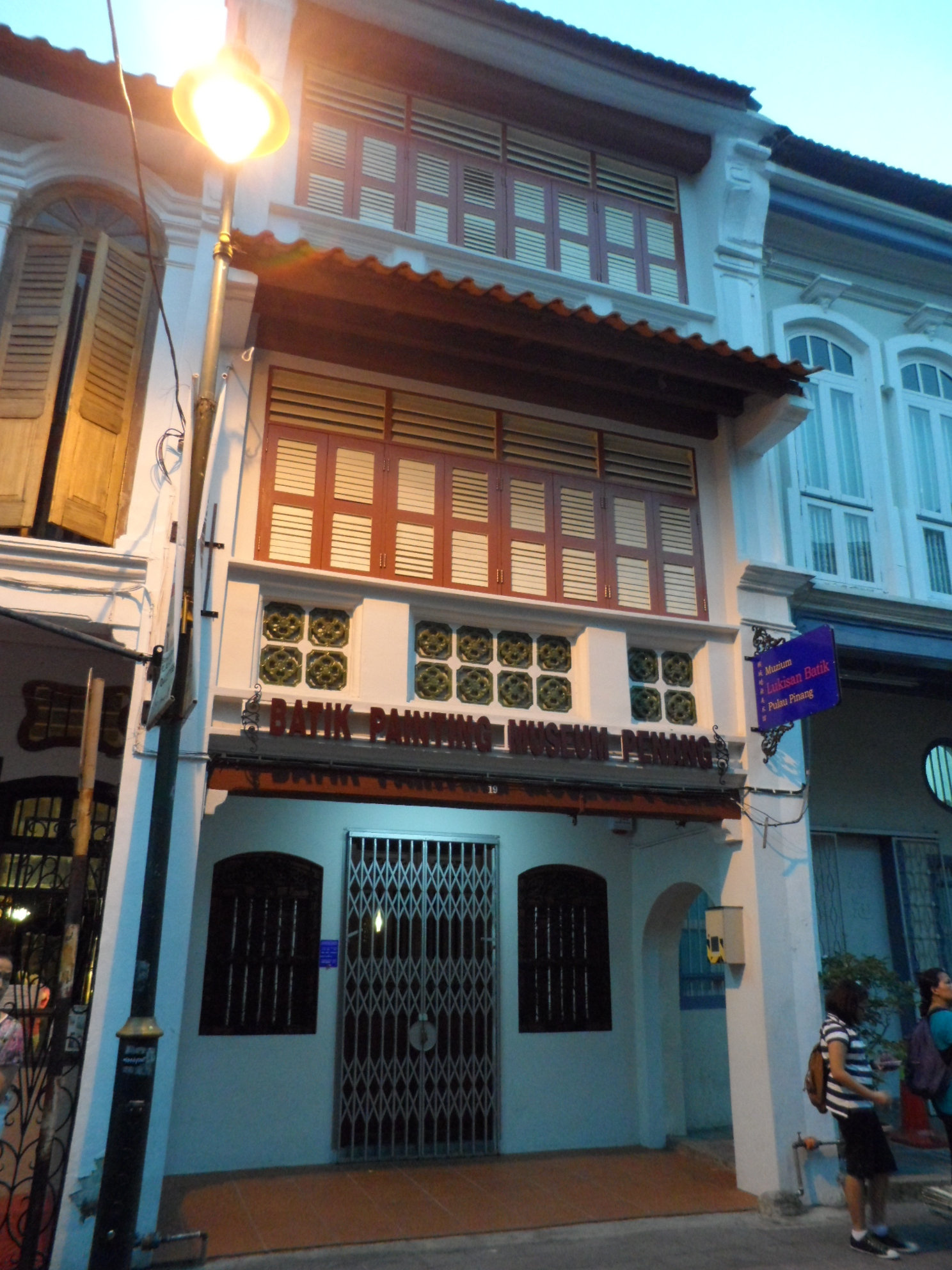

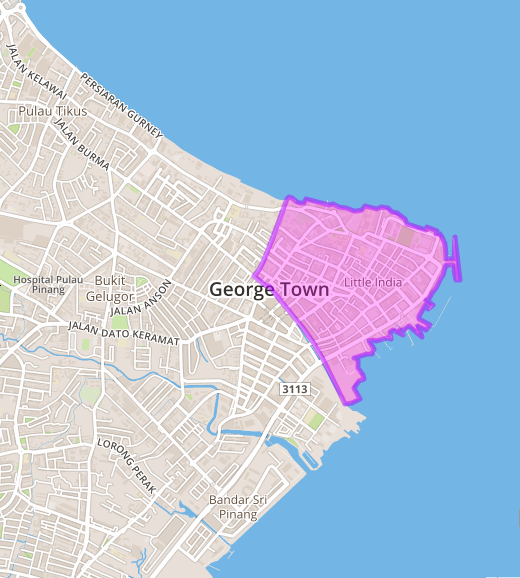
- Location within George Town's UNESCO World Heritage Site (purple)
- Established: 1 October 2013
- Location: George Town, Penang, Malaysia
- Coordinates: 5.414934°N 100.337778°E
- Type: museum
- Owner: Tan Chong Guan

UNESCO World Heritage Site
- Type: Cultural
- Criteria: ii, iii, iv
- Designated: 2008 (32nd session)
- Part of: George Town UNESCO Core Zone
- Reference no.: 1223
- Region: Asia-Pacific

The Batik Painting Museum Penang (Malay: Muzium Lukisan Batik Pulau Pinang) is a museum about batik in George Town, Penang, Malaysia.

== History ==
The building was purchased in 2010 and underwent a three-year renovation before it was opened on 1 October 2013.

== Architecture ==
The museum is located in a three-story Straits eclectic-style shop house with a total area of 650 m^{2}.

== Exhibition ==
There are around 80 batik paintings being exhibited in the museum. The Museum showcases the earliest batik paintings done in the 1950s by the 'Father of Batik Painting' Chuah Thean Teng in Penang and the subsequent works by other Malaysian artists. Currently there are now 80 batik paintings by 25 artists in display. A small international section is included. Visitors will be able to view an excellent collection of magnificent batik paintings not to be seen anywhere else. This is definitely the only batik painting museum in Malaysia.

== See also ==
- List of museums in Malaysia
