= Istana Batu Royal Museum =

Museum in Kota Bharu, Kelantan, Malaysia

- Muzium Diraja Istana Batu
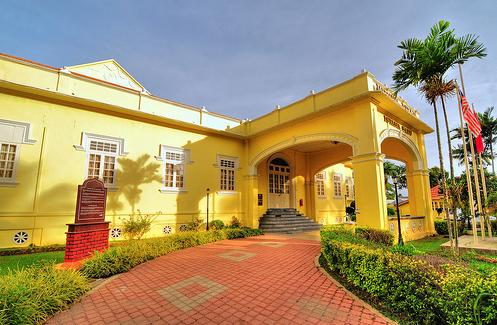
- Established: 1991
- Location: Kota Bharu, Kelantan, Malaysia
- Coordinates: 6°07′55.8″N 102°14′14.4″E
- Type: museum

The Istana Batu Royal Museum (Malay: Muzium Diraja Istana Batu) is a museum in Kota Bharu, Kelantan, Malaysia.

== History ==
The museum building was constructed in 1939 during the reign of Sultan Ismail ibni Sultan Muhammad IV as a wedding gift for his nephew Sultan Yahya Petra. Sultan Yahya Petra lived in the building until 1960 and moved to Kota Lama Palace once he ascended the throne. After he moved out, the building was renovated and became the official residence of Tengku Salwani binti Sultan Yahya Petra until 1969.

The building eventually became the palace for Sultan Ismail Petra until 1972. Later, it was donated to Kelantan State Government. On 25 July 1991, the building was converted into a museum and officiated by Sultan Ismail Petra.

== Architecture ==
The building is a yellow structure. Its interior rooms are the intersection, dining room, kitchen, drawing room, hallway and bed room.

== Exhibitions ==
The museum displays various belongings of the Sultan of Kelantan, such as photographs, costumes, artifacts, furniture etc.

== Opening time ==
The museum opens everyday except Fridays from 8:30 a.m. to 4:45 p.m.

== See also ==
- List of museums in Malaysia
