= Education Museum =

Museum in Melaka City, Melaka, Malaysia

- Muzium Pendidikan
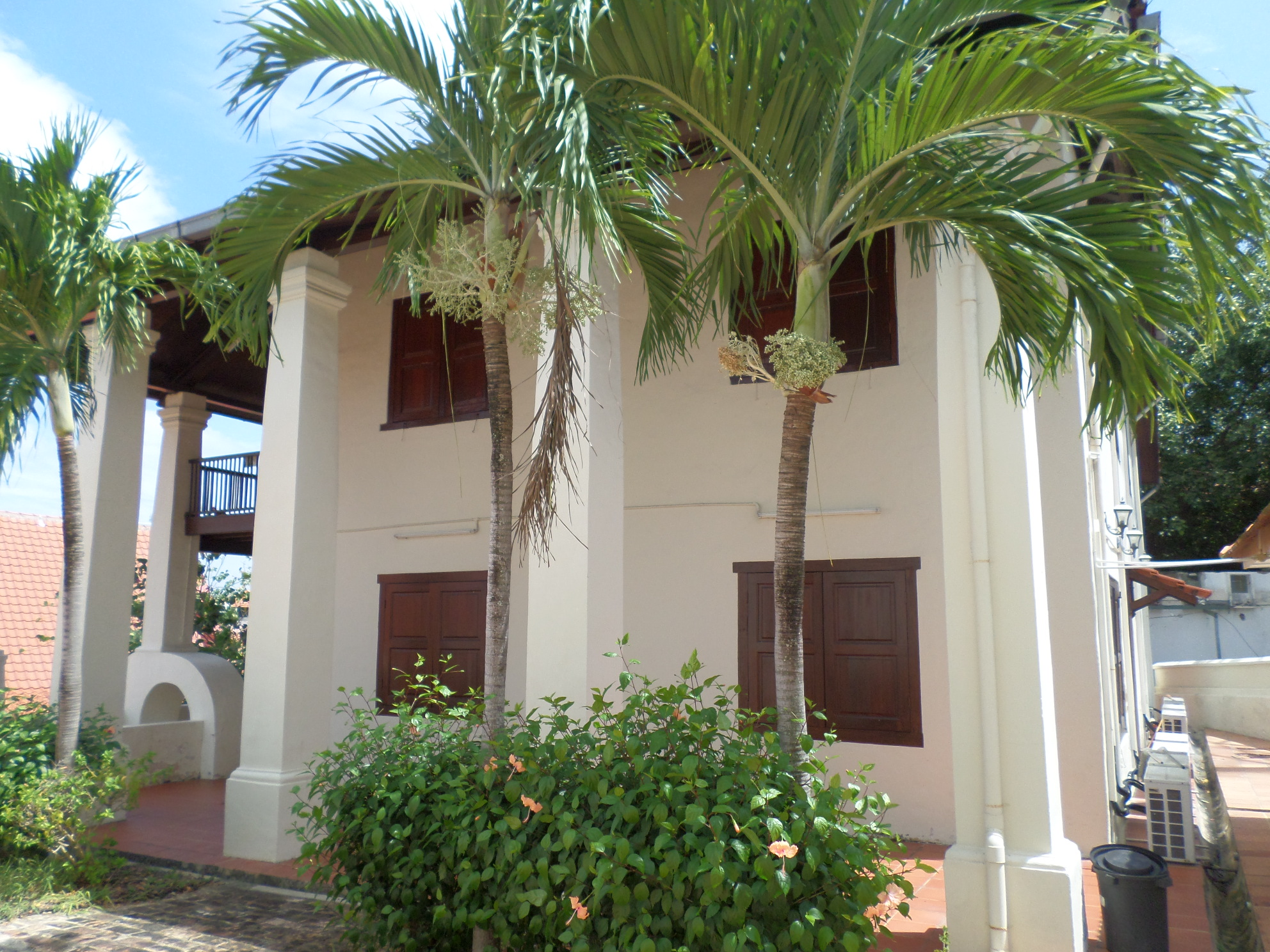
- Established: 2003
- Location: Malacca City, Malacca, Malaysia
- Coordinates: 2°11′38.5″N 102°14′59.6″E
- Type: museum

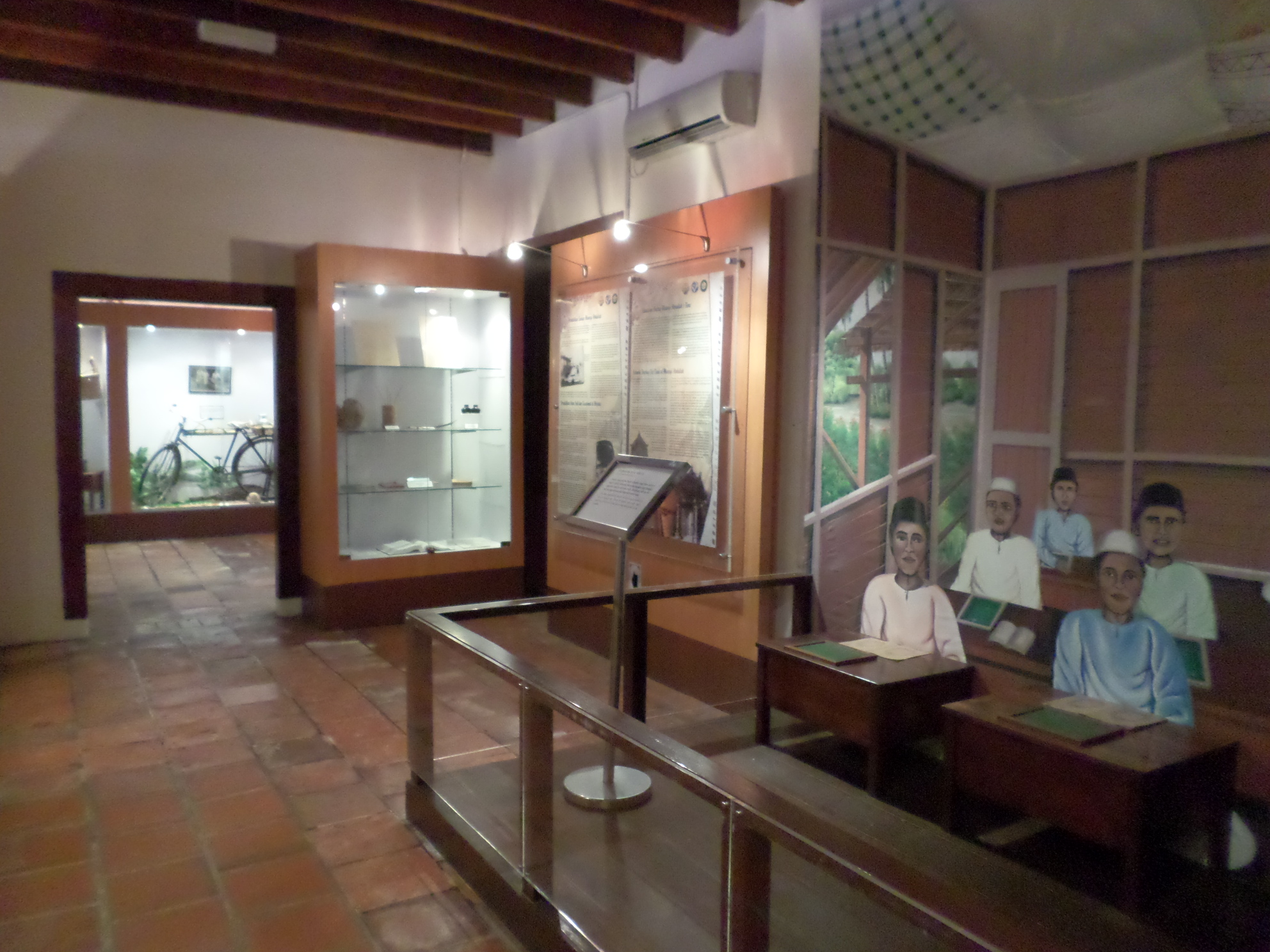
Education museum exhibition hall

The Education Museum (Malay: Muzium Pendidikan) is a museum in Malacca City, Malacca, Malaysia, which exhibits the historical development of the state's education system from the Malacca Sultanate, British Malaya, Japanese occupation and the present time.

The building that houses the museum was built in 1884, during the British Malaya era and its design is a mix of British, Dutch, Moorish and Anglo-Chinese architecture styles. Its windows are of Dutch design with no wind holes, using British materials and bricks and Indian double-layered roof and roof tiles. In 1931, it housed the Malacca High School. But due to the growing number of student intake, the school had to be relocated to Chan Koon Cheng Street. The building then housed the Malacca Labour and Audit Department until 1978. After that, the department relocated to the Federal Building at Hang Tuah Street and the building was left vacant. In 2003, the building underwent renovation and the Malacca Museum Corporation proposed to the Malacca State Government to convert the building into the Museum of Education due to its historical past of housing the Malacca High School.

== See also ==
- List of museums in Malaysia
- List of tourist attractions in Malacca
