= Straits Chinese Jewellery Museum =

Museum in Melaka Tengah, Malacca, Malaysia

- Muzium Perhiasan Cina Selat
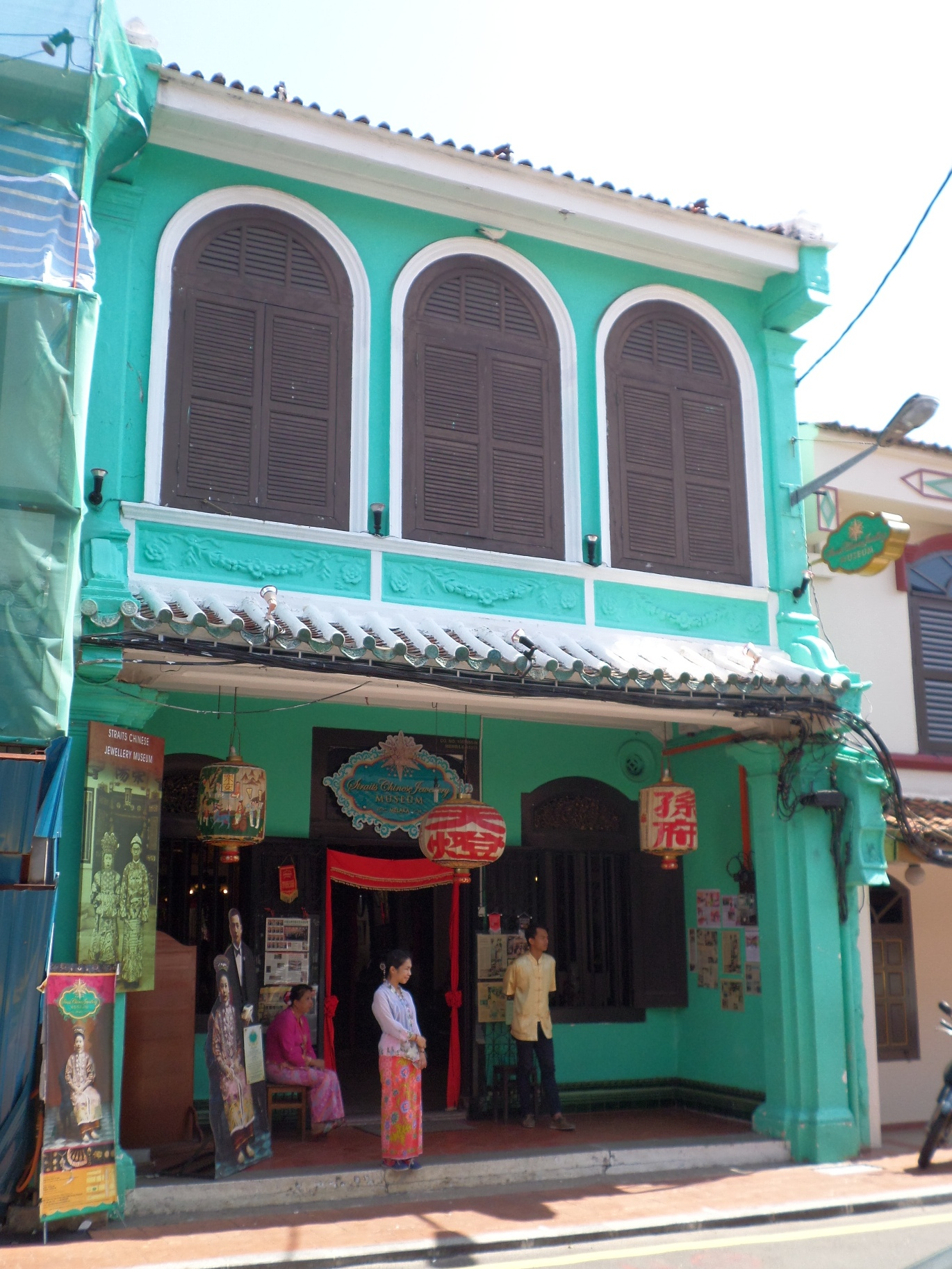
- Established: October 2012
- Location: Malacca City, Malacca, Malaysia
- Coordinates: 2°11′46.7″N 102°14′43.5″E
- Type: museum
- Director: Lilian Tong

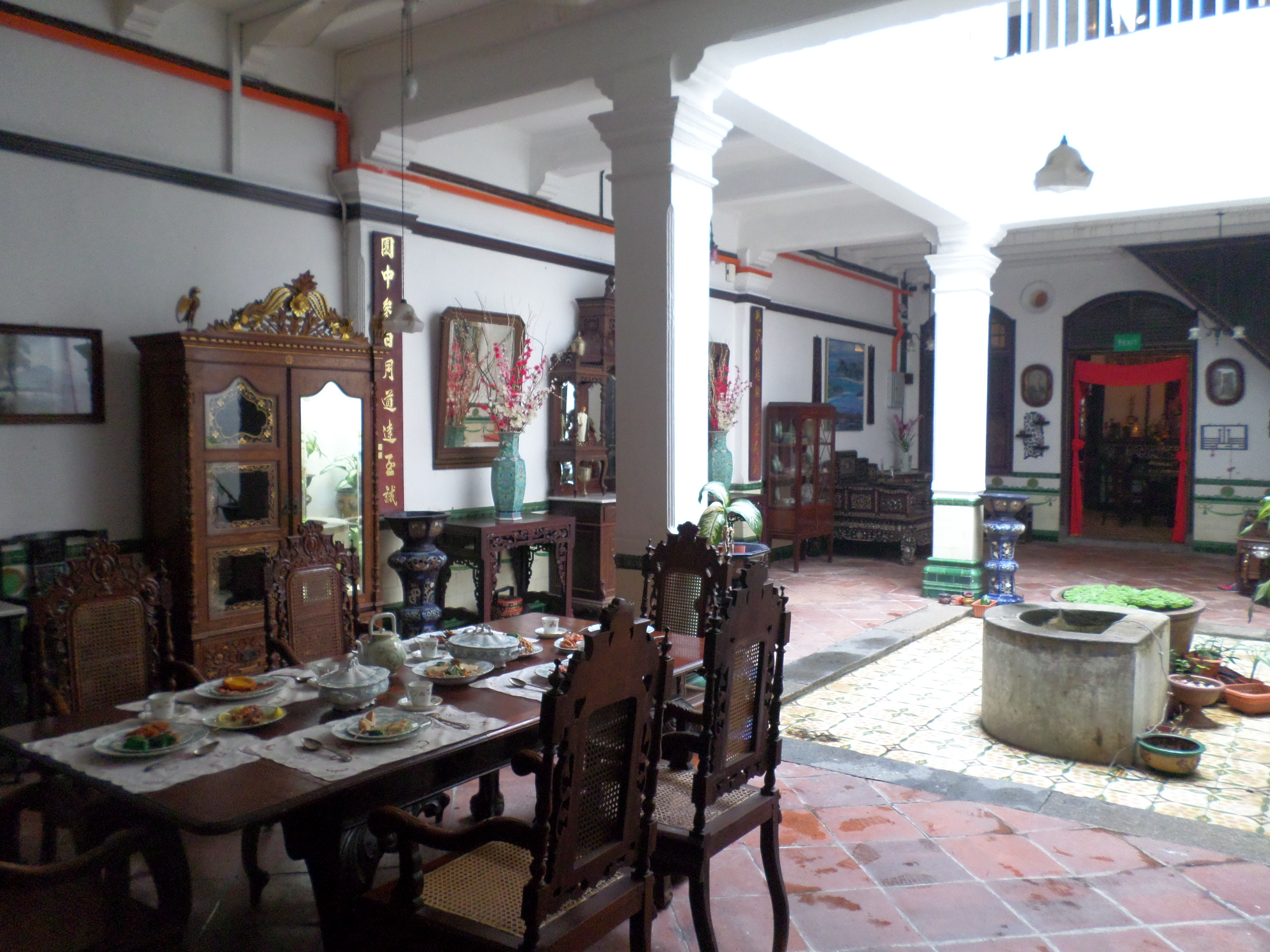
Straits Chinese Jewellery Museum exhibition hall

Straits Chinese Jewellery Museum (Malay: Muzium Perhiasan Cina Selat; simplified Chinese: 海峡华人珠宝博物馆; traditional Chinese: 海峽華人珠寶博物館; pinyin: Hǎixiá huárén zhūbǎo bówùguǎn; Pe̍h-ōe-jī: Hái-kiap Hôa-jîn Chu-pó Phok-bu̍t-koán) is a museum which displays the furniture and jewellery of the Peranakan culture in Malacca City, Malacca, Malaysia. It was opened in October 2012 and housed in a heritage house building that used to be a house of a prominent Peranakan Chinese. The house consists of segments such as living room, two open-space courtyards and dining room.

Collections in the museum are more than 30 years old, ranging from brooches, shoes and porcelain to rings, which are influenced by Chinese design and motifs and created by Chinese, Indian and Sri Lankan craftsmen. Besides the various types of jewellery which numbers up to 400, the museum also houses the jewellery making equipment and the lifestyle gallery. The museum opens everyday from 10.00 a.m. to 5.00 p.m. on weekdays and to 6 p.m. on weekends.

== See also ==
- List of museums in Malaysia
- List of tourist attractions in Malacca
