= Kelantan Islamic Museum =

Museum in Kota Bharu, Kelantan, Malaysia

- Muzium Islam Kelantan
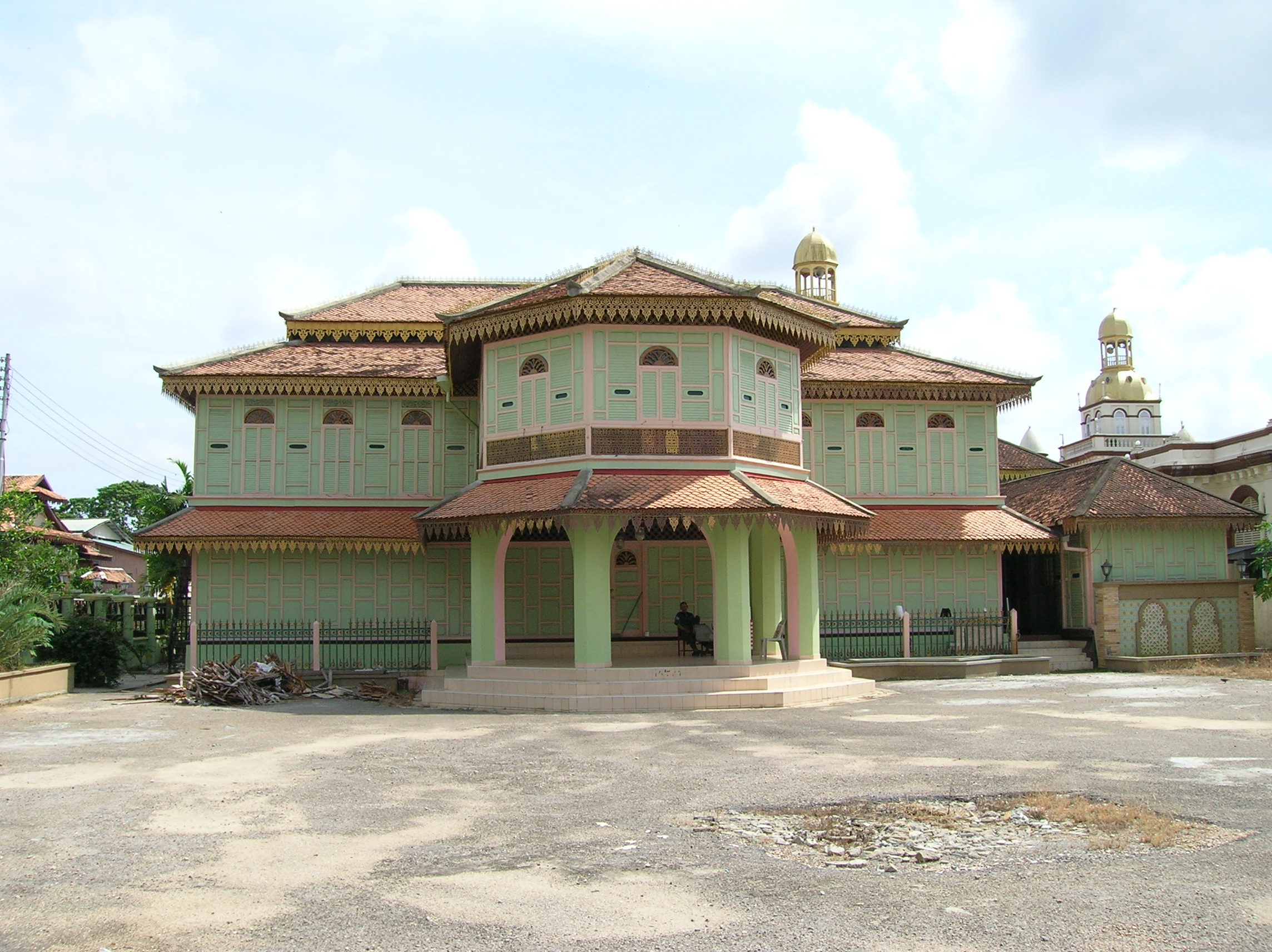
- Established: 11 November 1991
- Location: Kota Bharu, Kelantan, Malaysia
- Coordinates: 6°08′N 102°14′E
- Type: museum

The Kelantan Islamic Museum (Malay: Muzium Islam Kelantan) is a museum about Islam in Kota Bharu, Kelantan, Malaysia.

== History ==
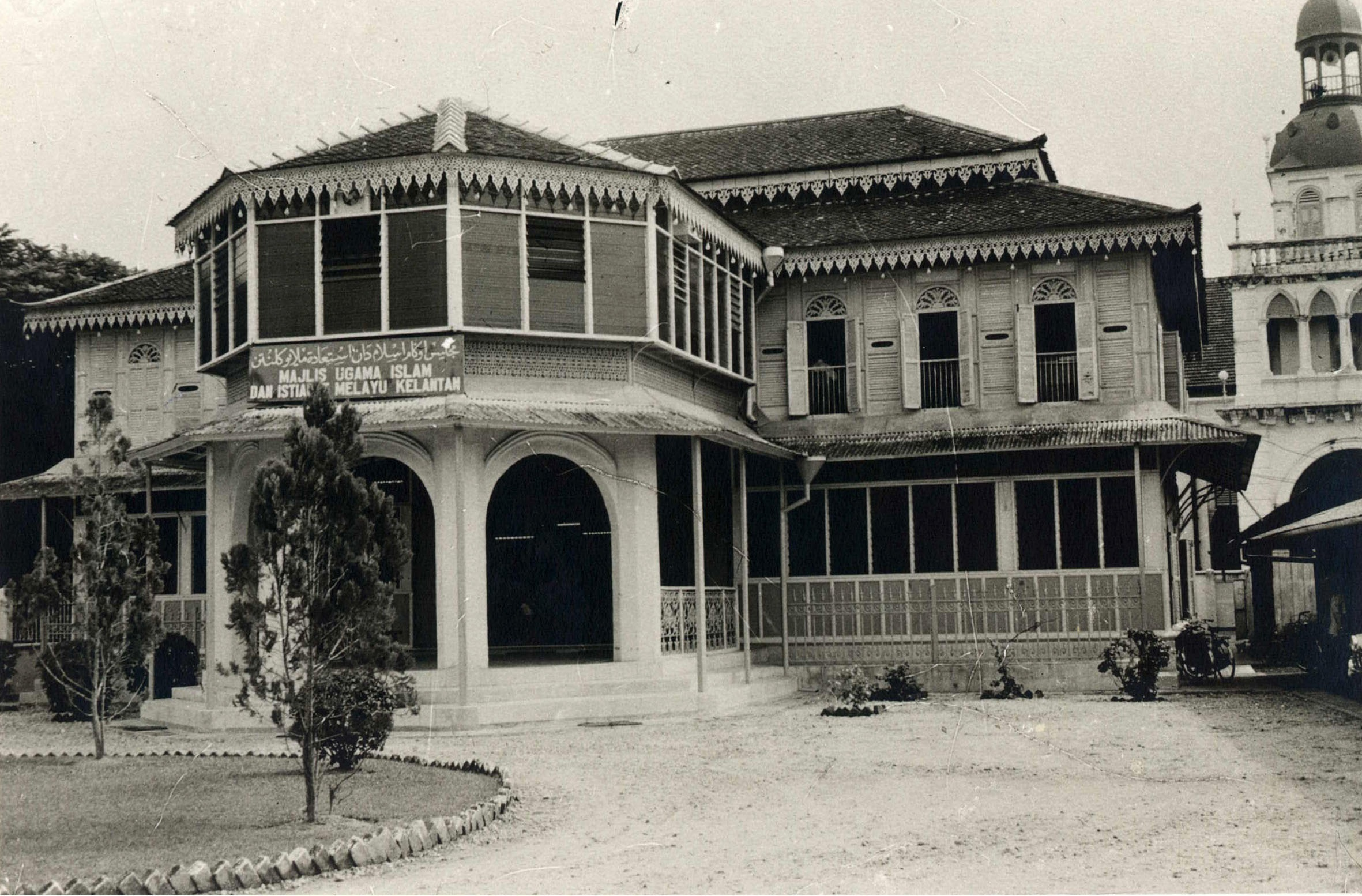
Kelantan Islamic Council and Malay Costumes

The museum building used to be the official residence of Kelantan Chief Minister Hassan Mohd Salleh. The building also used to house the Kelantan Islamic Council and Malay Costumes from 1917 to 1990. The building was then renovated and turned into museum which was opened on 11 November 1991 by Kelantan Sultan Ismail Petra.

== Architecture ==
The 2-story museum building was built by wood and embedded with Islamic calligraphy of verses from the Quran. It has two stories where the lower floor houses the museum and the upper floor houses a library. The museum building resembles a mosque.

== Exhibitions ==
The museum exhibits the root of Islam in Kelantan from various artifacts and inscription documents it displays.

== See also ==
- List of museums in Malaysia
