= Proclamation of Independence Memorial =

Museum in Melaka City, Melaka, Malaysia

- Memorial Pengisytiharan Kemerdekaan
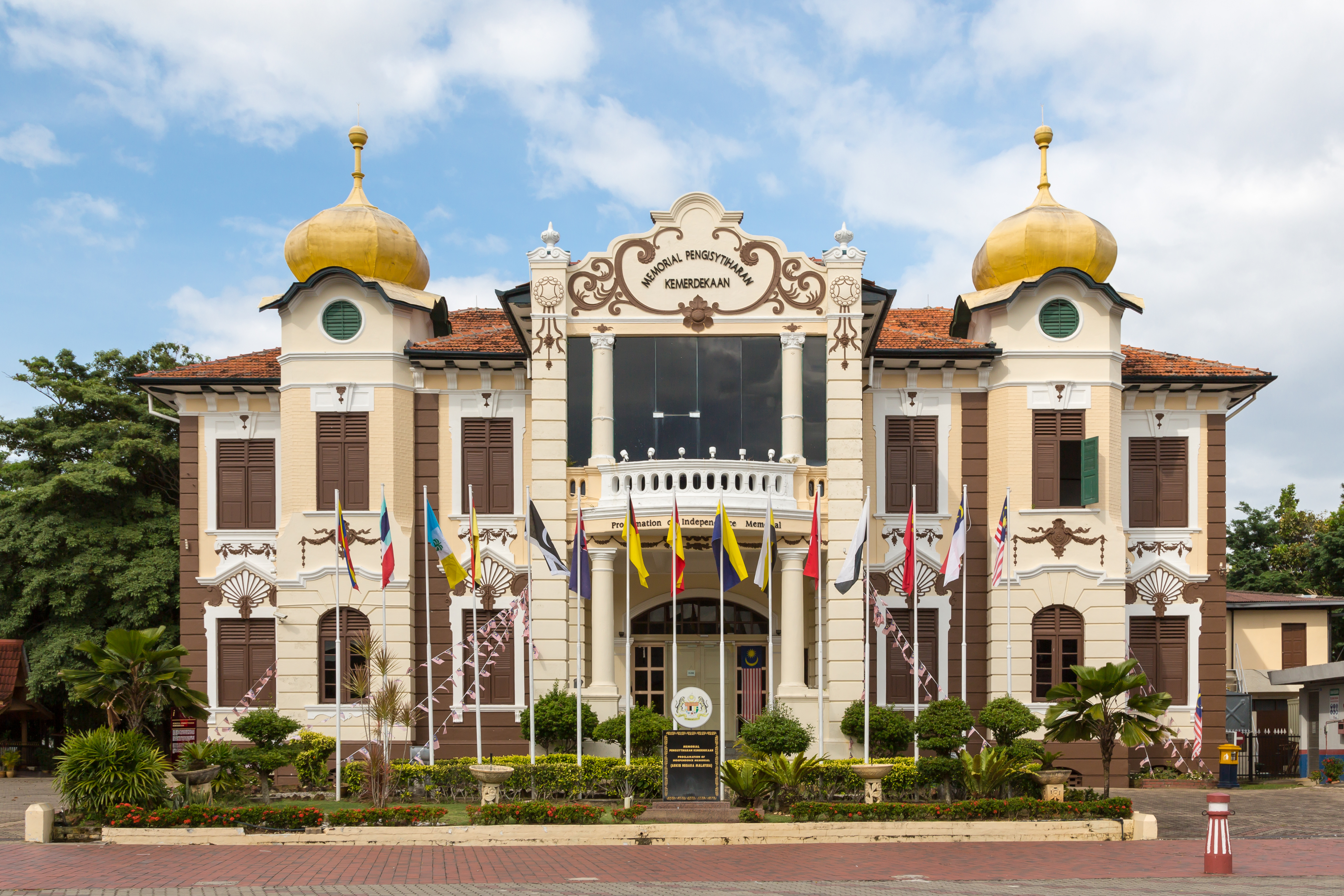
- Established: 31 August 1985
- Location: Melaka City, Melaka, Malaysia
- Coordinates: 2°11′30.8″N 102°15′03.2″E
- Type: museum

The Proclamation of Independence Memorial (Malay: Memorial Pengisytiharan Kemerdekaan) is a museum in Melaka City, Melaka, Malaysia.

== History ==
The memorial building was established in 1912. The building used to house the Malacca Club which was used as the social centre of the British people in British Malaya. The memorial was set up and officiated by former Prime Minister Tunku Abdul Rahman on 31 August 1985, 28 years after the independence of the country.

== Architecture ==
The museum is housed in an elegant Dutch colonial mansion. The two golden onion domes located at the top of the building embellish the stark white stucco.

== Exhibitions ==
The memorial exhibits records and photos of the early era of Malay Sultanate. It also displays the journey of Malaysia from independence and its modern development.

== See also ==
- List of museums in Malaysia
- List of tourist attractions in Melaka
