= Paddy Museum =

Museum in Kota Setar, Kedah, Malaysia

- Muzium Padi
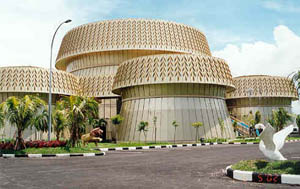
- Established: 12 October 2004
- Location: Alor Setar, Kedah, Malaysia
- Coordinates: 6°11′29.2″N 100°19′33.6″E
- Type: museum

The Paddy Museum (Malay: Muzium Padi) is a museum in Alor Setar, Kota Setar, Kedah, Malaysia.

== History ==
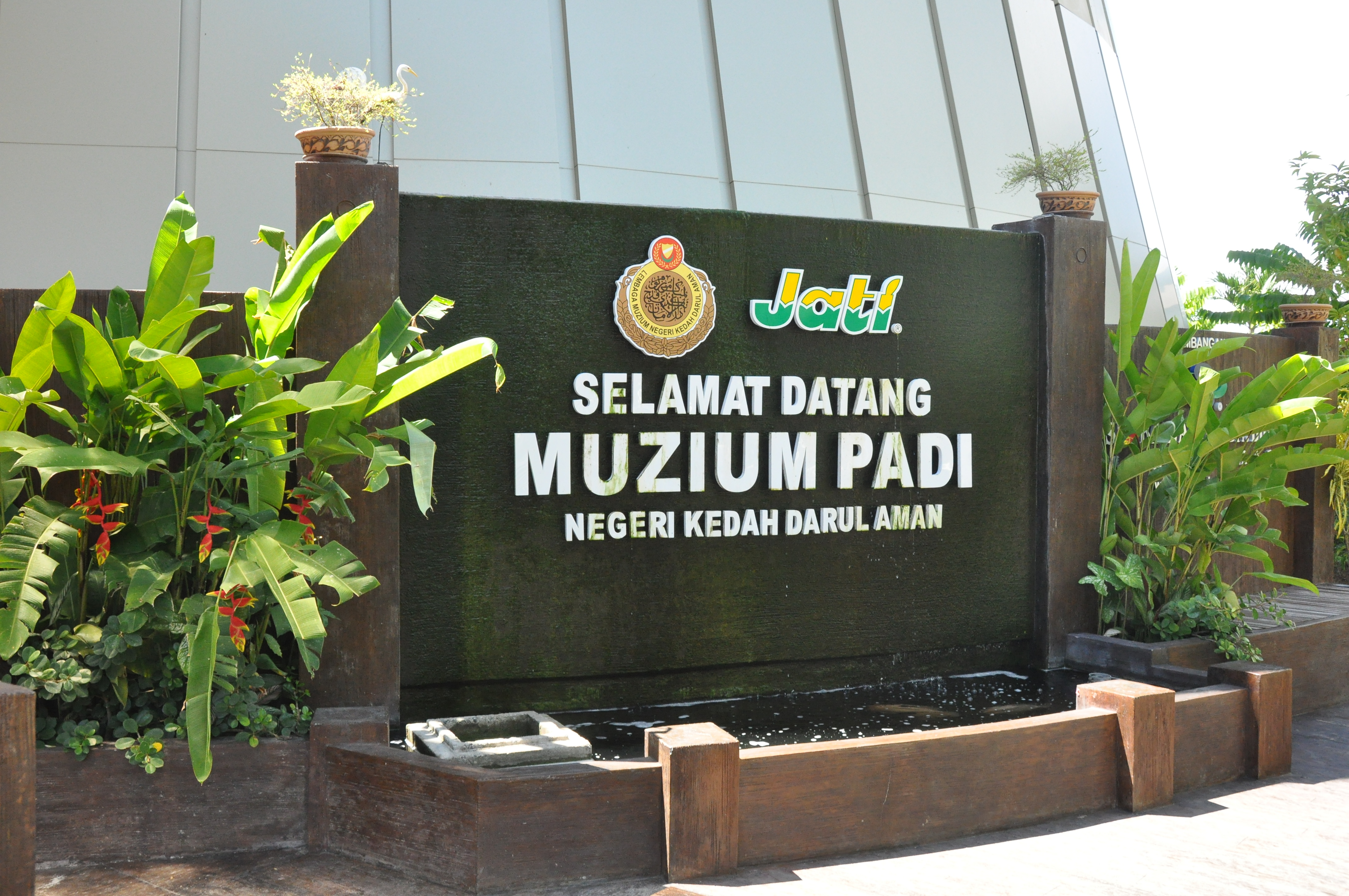

The museum was constructed on a land belonged to the Malaysian Agricultural Development Authority at a cost of MYR24.7 million. It was inaugurated and opened on 12 October 2004 by Kedah Sultan Abdul Halim.

== Architecture ==
The museum is a 3-story building with a total area of 12,000 m^{2}. It resembles bushels of harvested rice stalks decorated with rice motifs. The murals on the museum wall was done by 60 artists from North Korea.

== Exhibitions ==
The museum exhibits paddy cultivation process in Malaysia and the tools and equipment for the process over the past decades.

== See also ==
- List of museums in Malaysia
- Agriculture in Malaysia
