= Kite Museum (Johor) =

Museum in Johor Bahru, Johor, Malaysia

- Muzium Layang-Layang
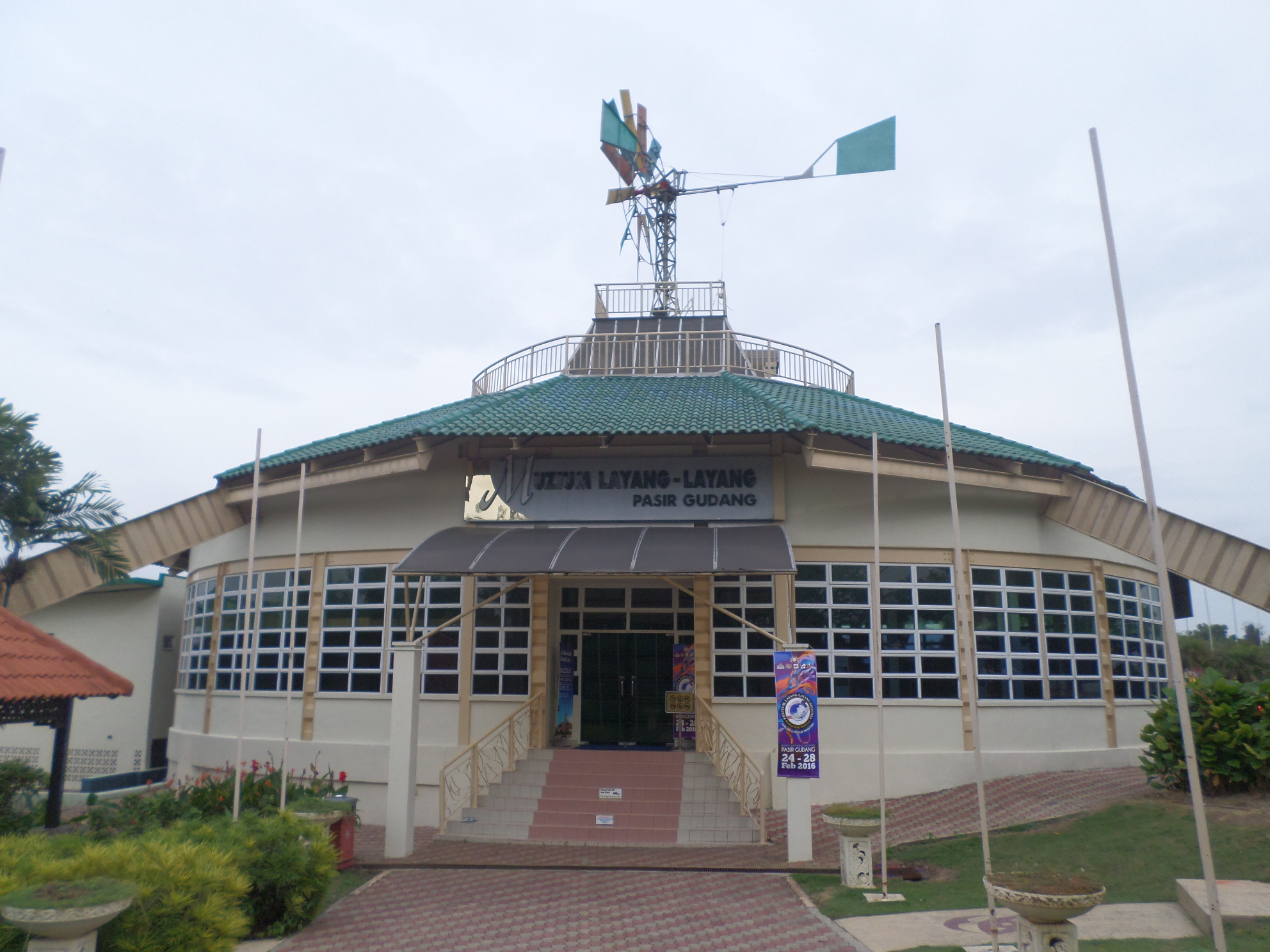
- Established: February 2002
- Location: Johor Bahru, Johor, Malaysia
- Coordinates: 1°28′29.9″N 103°54′23.0″E
- Type: museum

The Kite Museum (Malay: Muzium Layang-Layang) is a museum about kites in Pasir Gudang, Johor Bahru District, Johor, Malaysia.

== History ==
The museum was established in February 2002 during the 7th Pasir Gudang International Kite Festival.

== Architecture ==
The museum is housed in a two-story building. It features a small windmill to generate its own electricity.

== Exhibitions ==
The museum showcases various types of kites, posters and videos on Pasir Gudang International Kite Festival.

== See also ==
- List of museums in Malaysia
