= Islamic Heritage Museum =

Museum in Kuching, Sarawak, Malaysia

- Muzium Warisan Islam
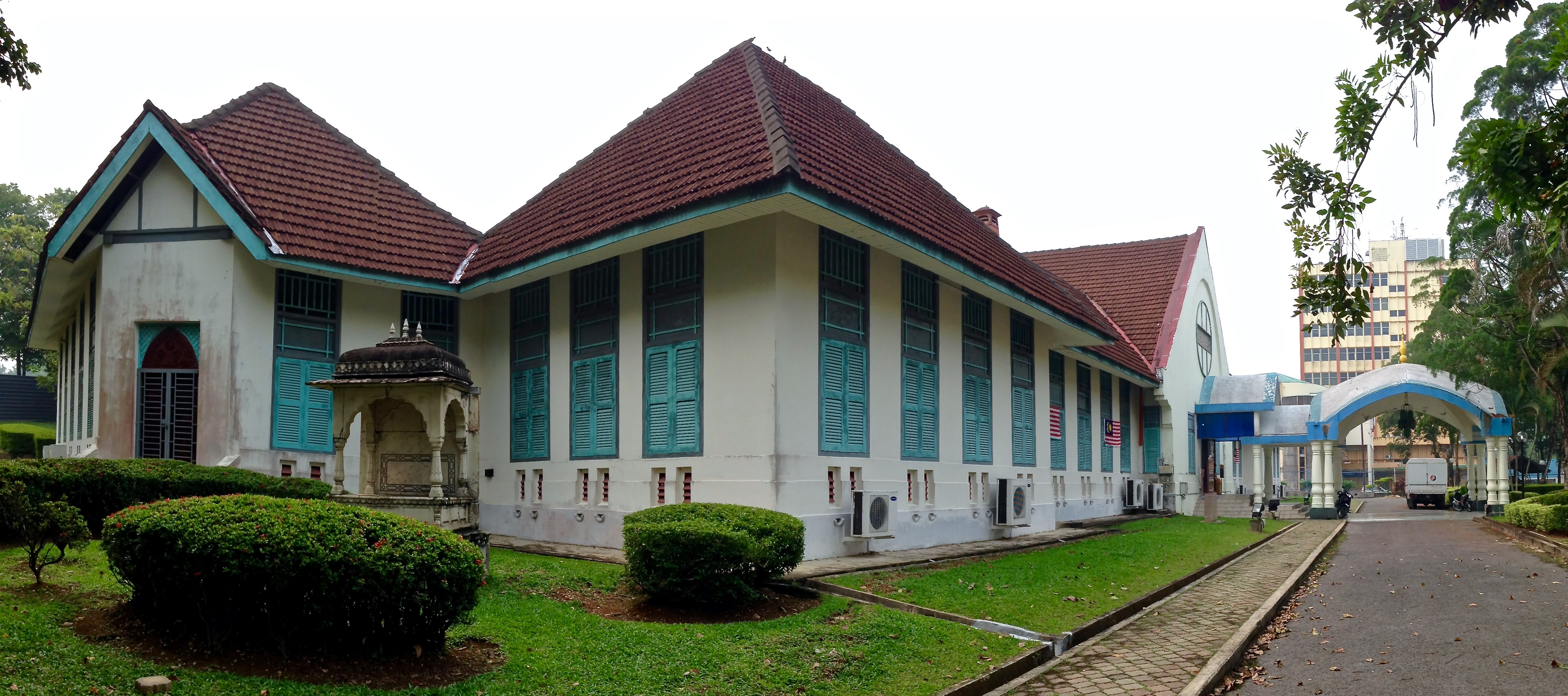
- Established: 1930, re-established on 22 May 1992
- Location: Kuching, Sarawak, Malaysia
- Coordinates: 1°34′N 110°20′E
- Type: Museum

The Islamic Heritage Museum (Malay: Muzium Warisan Islam) is a museum in Kuching, Sarawak, Malaysia. It is part of the Kuching Heritage Trail.

== History ==
The museum was originally constructed as the James Brooke Malay College school building. It was then later changed to the Sarawak Malay Madrasa in 1930. In 1992, the building was converted into the Islamic Heritage Museum on 22 May 1992.

== Architecture ==
The museum building uses raised floor and it has two inner courtyards. The material used for the building construction are concrete, timber and bricks. It consists of seven galleries, which are:

- History of Islam in Sarawak
- Islamic Architecture
- Islamic Science, Technology, Economy, Education and Literature
- Islamic Costume, Music and Personal Collections
- Islamic Weaponry
- Islamic Decoration Art and Domestic Utensil
- Quran Collections

== Exhibitions ==
The museum exhibits the history and culture of the Muslim community in Sarawak and the Malay Archipelago, such as the development of Islam.

== Opening time ==
The museum opens everyday from 9:00 a.m. to 4:45 p.m. on weekdays and from 10:00 a.m. to 4:00 p.m. on weekends free of charge.

== See also ==
- List of museums in Malaysia
- Islam in Malaysia
