= Democratic Government Museum =

Museum in Melaka Tengah, Malacca, Malaysia

- Muzium Pemerintahan Demokrasi
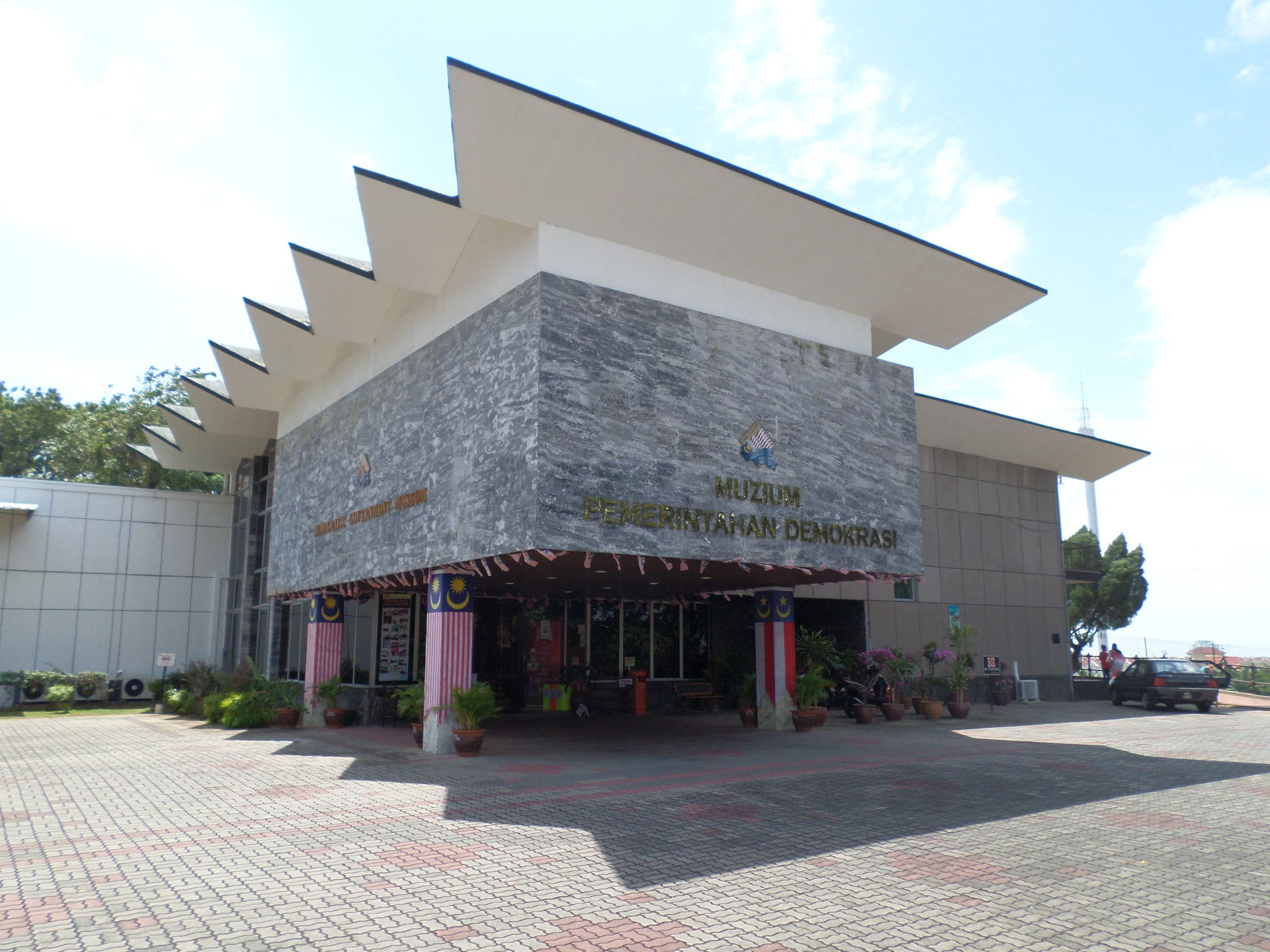
- Established: 13 August 1961
- Location: Malacca City, Malacca, Malaysia
- Coordinates: 2°11′35.0″N 102°14′56.5″E
- Type: museum

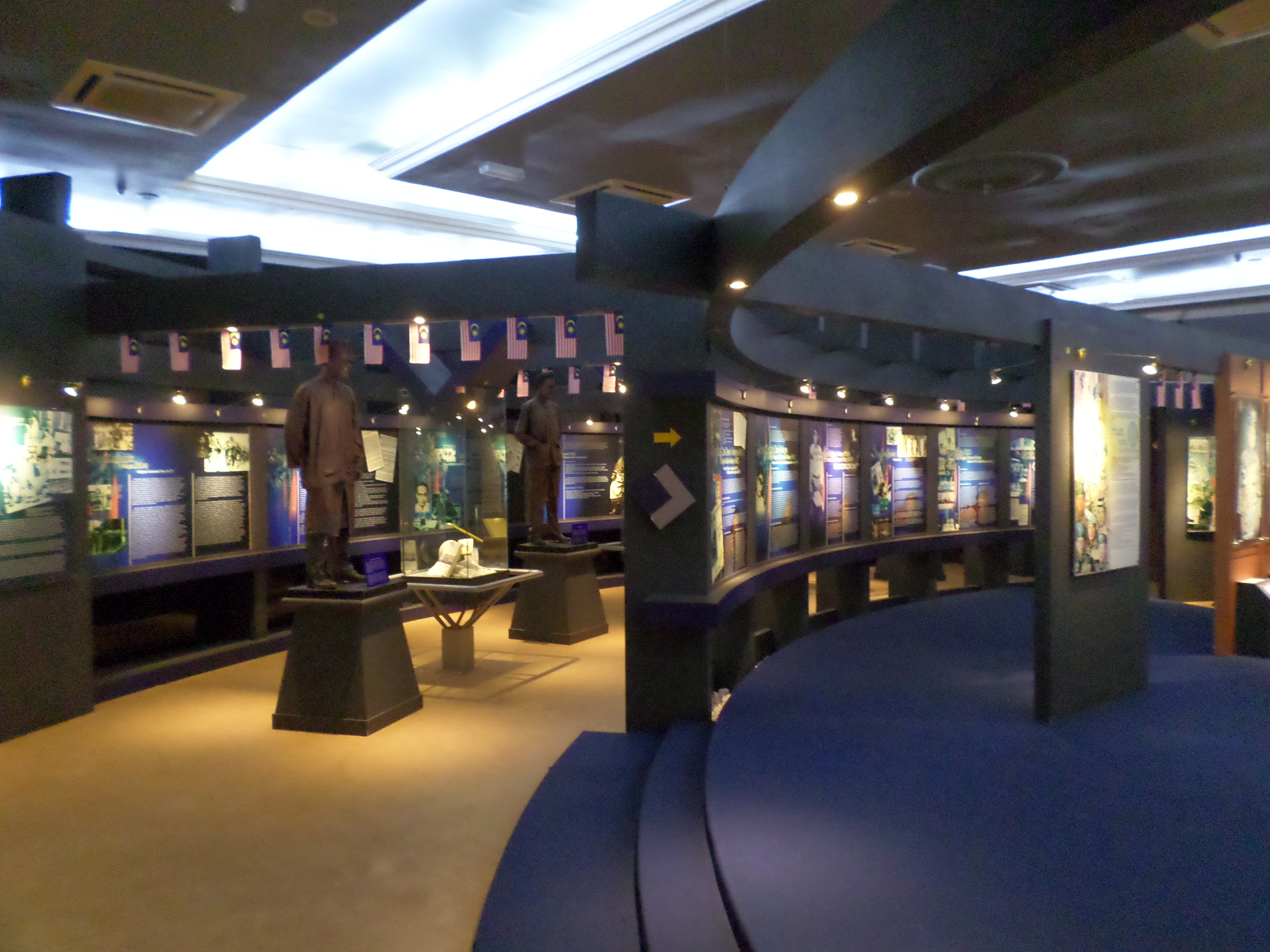
Democratic Government Museum exhibition hall

The Democratic Government Museum (Malay: Muzium Pemerintahan Demokrasi) is a museum about the development and practice of parliamentary democracy, which is located at St. Paul's Hill in Malacca City, Malacca, Malaysia. The museum was formerly the Malacca State Legislative Assembly building, which had moved to Ayer Keroh as its present location since February 2000, in which its foundation stone was laid on 13 August 1961.

== See also ==
- List of museums in Malaysia
- List of tourist attractions in Malacca
