= Johor Bahru Chinese Heritage Museum =

Museum in Johor Bahru, Johor, Malaysia

- Muzium Warisan Tionghua Johor Bahru
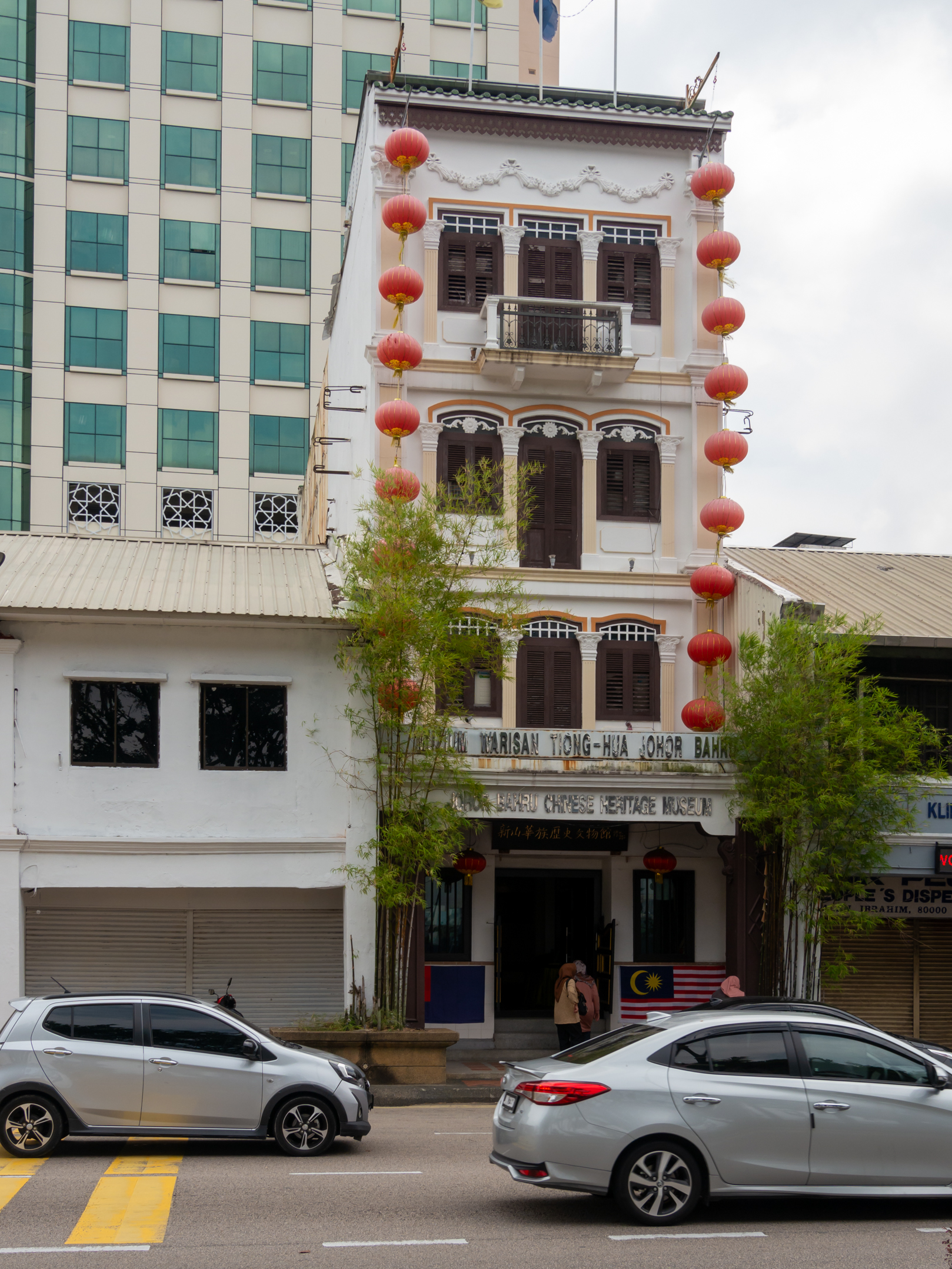
- Location: Johor Bahru, Johor, Malaysia
- Coordinates: 1°27′21.8″N 103°45′47.5″E
- Type: museum
- Public transit access: Johor Bahru Sentral Station

The Johor Bahru Chinese Heritage Museum (Malay: Muzium Warisan Tionghua Johor Bahru) is a museum in Johor Bahru, Johor, Malaysia. The museum is about the history of Chinese community in Johor Bahru.

== Architecture ==
The museum is housed in a four-story shop house building.

== Exhibitions ==
Collections in the museum include documents, music instruments, old money, photos, porcelain etc. It showcases the early days of the Chinese settlement in Johor Bahru, their history, culture, traditions and occupations.

== Opening time ==
The museum opens everyday except Mondays from 9.00 a.m. to 5.00 p.m. for MYR3.

== See also ==
- List of museums in Malaysia
