= Malacca Islamic Museum =

Museum in Melaka Tengah, Malacca, Malaysia

- Muzium Islam Melaka
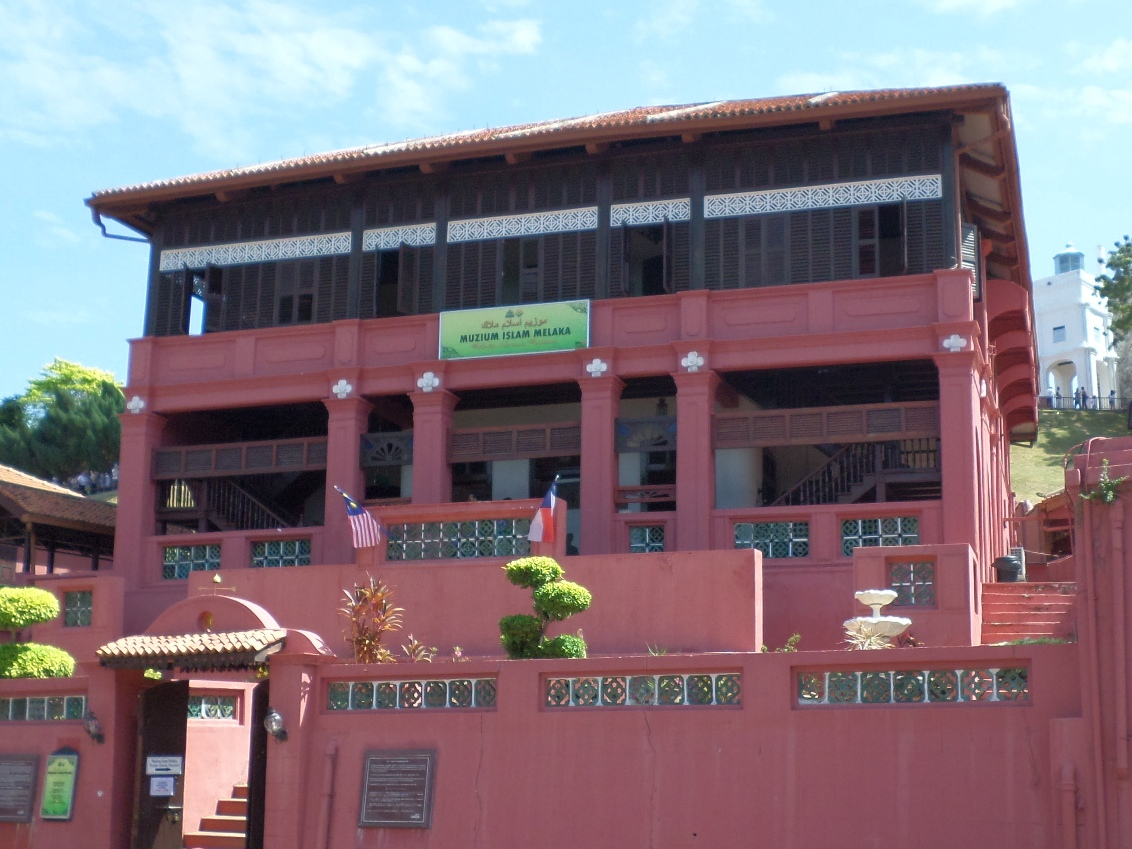
- Location: Malacca City, Malacca, Malaysia
- Coordinates: 2°11′N 102°15′E
- Type: museum

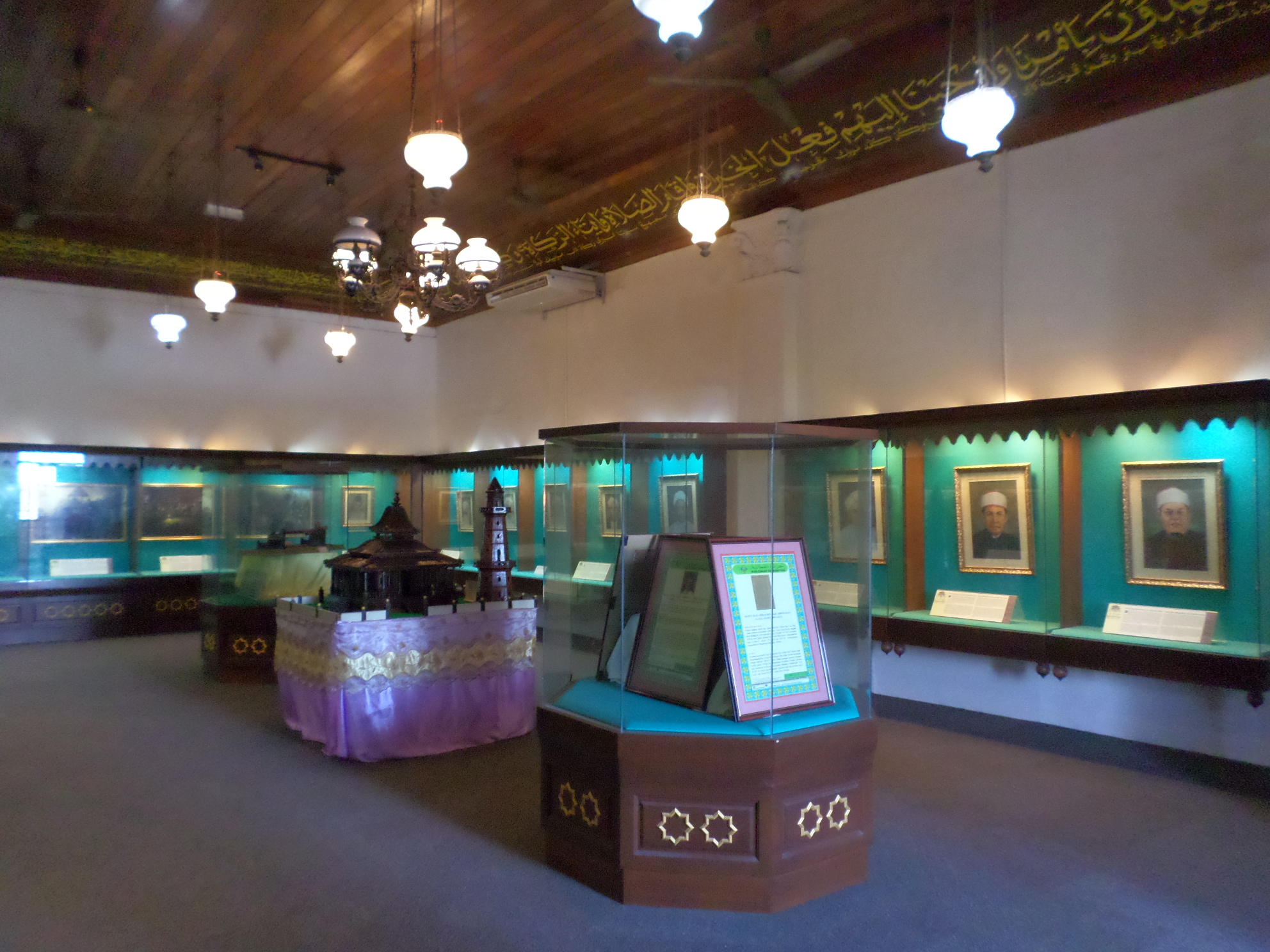
Museum exhibition hall

Malacca Islamic Museum (Malay: Muzium Islam Melaka) is a museum about Islamic culture in Malacca City, Malacca, Malaysia. It exhibits various artifacts about the replica of early Quran manuscripts, history of mosques in the state, various religious figures from the state and Malaysia etc. The museum building used to house the Islamic Council of Malacca Office before it was shifted to its current location beside the State Mosque. Before the establishment of the Islamic museum, extensive renovations were done to create space for the museum.

== See also ==
- List of museums in Malaysia
- List of tourist attractions in Malacca
