= Labuan Museum =

Museum in Labuan, Malaysia

- Muzium Labuan
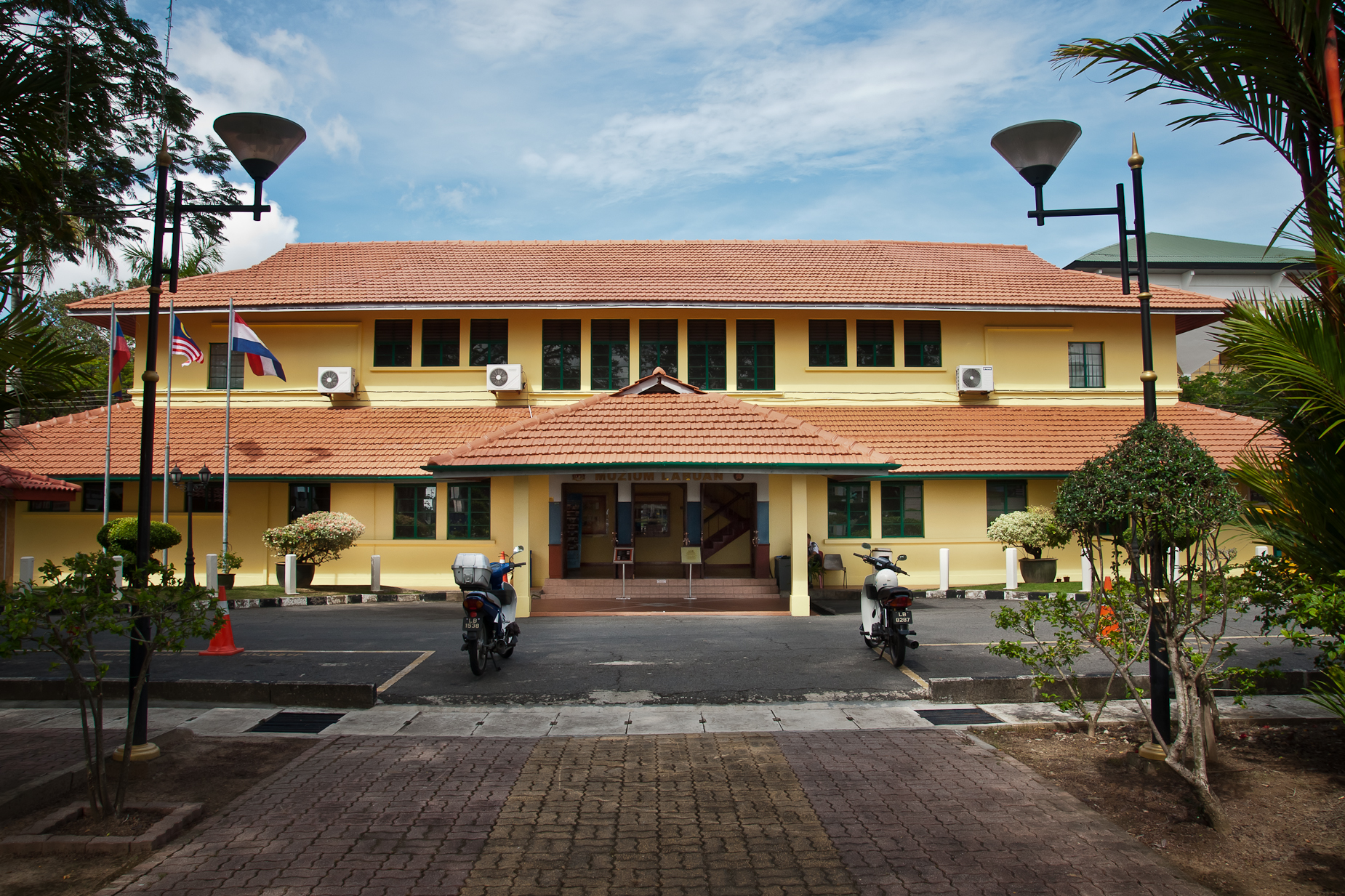
- Established: 8 October 2004; 21 years ago
- Location: Labuan, Malaysia
- Coordinates: 05°16′37″N 115°14′43″E
- Type: museum

The Labuan Museum (Malay: Muzium Labuan) is a museum located along Jalan Dewan in central Labuan, Malaysia.

== History ==
The museum building was originally constructed in the 1950s. It was once the administration office of the British North Borneo government. After the formation of Malaysia in 1963, the building was once used as the Labuan district office and Labuan Municipal Council office building. In 1997, restoration works were done to the building followed by interior design works in 2002. The museum was officially opened on 8 October 2004 as the third museum opened in Labuan by Culture, Arts and Heritage Minister Rais Yatim.

== Architecture ==
The museum building is a colonial era building which consists of 2 floors.

== Exhibitions ==
The museum showcases the history and culture of Labuan. On the lower floor, it displays the history of Labuan since its prehistory until the birth of Labuan as a federal territory of Malaysia and the establishment of Labuan as the international offshore financial centre. On the upper floor, it displays the culture and economy of the Labuan people through six sections through various artifacts, such as musical instrument, weapons, clothes etc.

== See also ==
- List of museums in Malaysia
