= Figure Museum =

Museum in Johor Bahru, Johor, Malaysia

- Muzium Tokoh
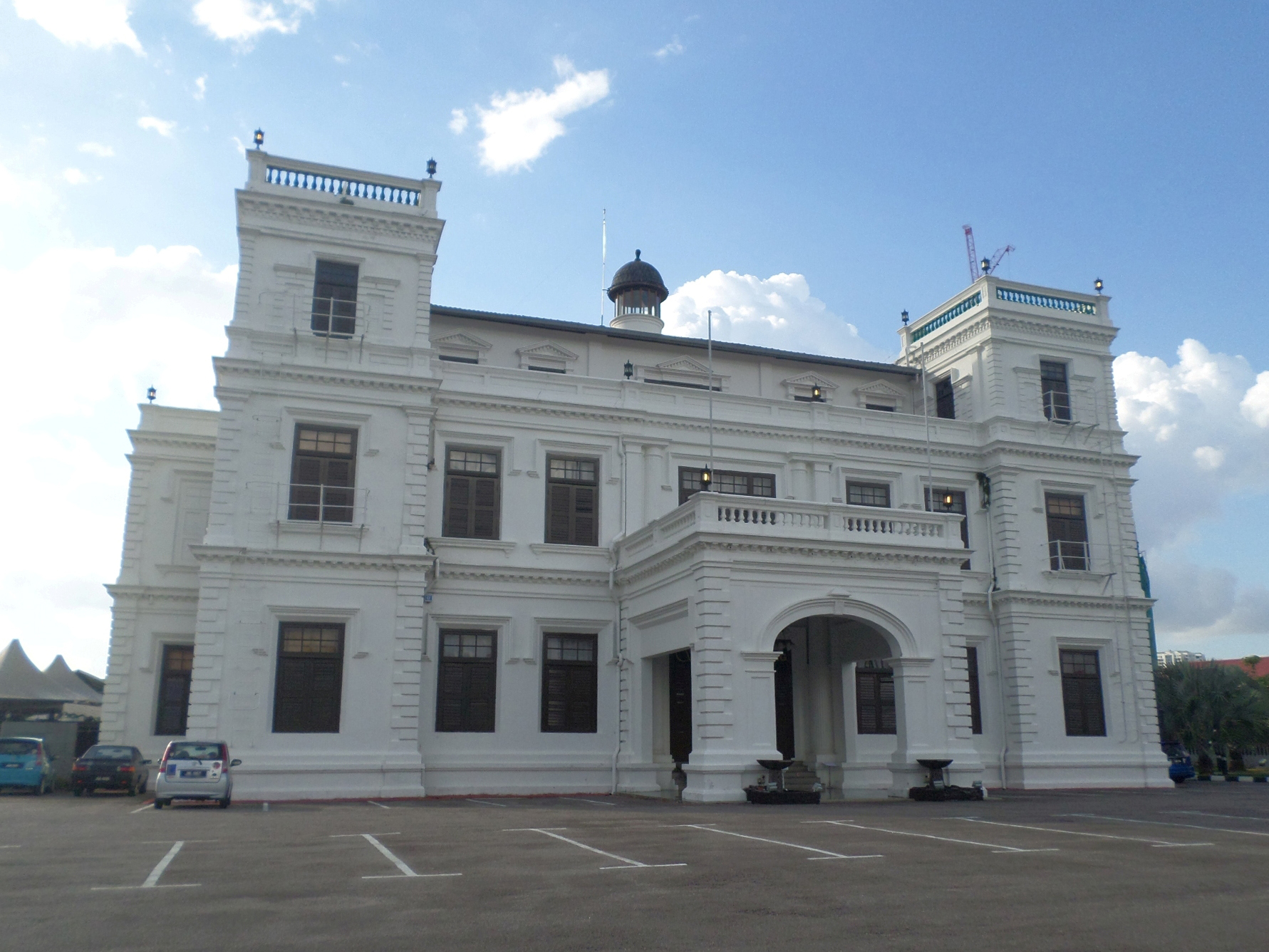
- Location: Johor Bahru, Johor, Malaysia
- Coordinates: 1°28′20.4″N 103°45′56.1″E
- Type: museum

The Figure Museum (Malay: Muzium Tokoh) is a museum in Johor Bahru, Johor, Malaysia.

== History ==
The museum building was originally constructed in 1896 in British Malaya.

== Architecture ==
The museum is housed in the Dato' Jaafar Building, which was the official residence of Jaafar Muhammad, the first Chief Minister of Johor. The building was constructed in a 100-hectare of land on Senyum Hill. The building resembles the British Royal family buildings Hardwick Hall in the United Kingdom. The building consists of three floors and four towers at its each corner.

== Exhibitions ==
The museum showcases the history of Johor and Johor Sultanate. It also regularly holds temporary exhibitions about famous people of Johor.

== See also ==
- List of museums in Malaysia
