= Bugis Museum =

Museum in Pontian, Johor, Malaysia

- Muzium Bugis
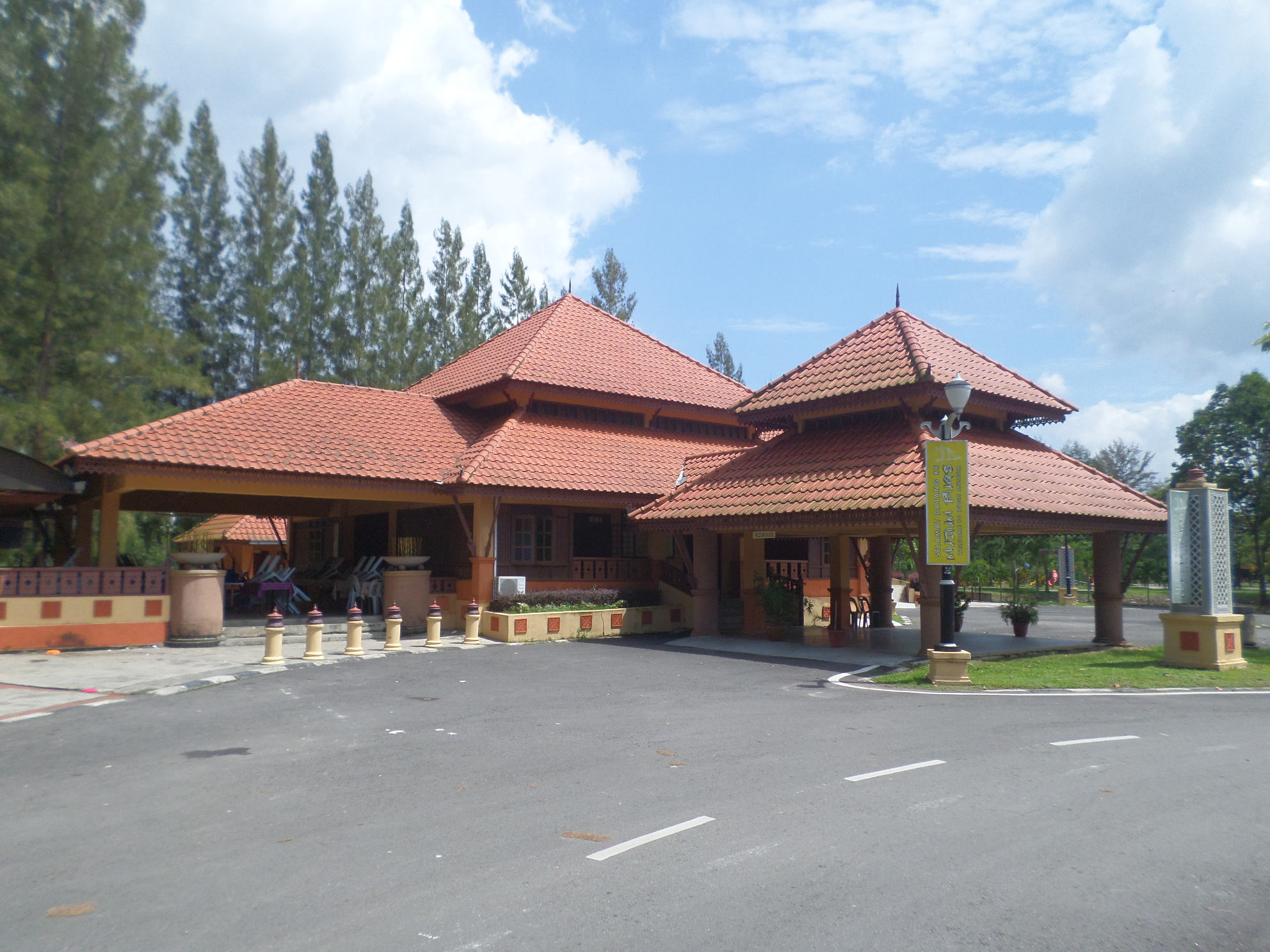
- Established: 1982
- Location: Pontian, Johor, Malaysia
- Coordinates: 1°25′40.9″N 103°24′42.5″E
- Type: museum

The Bugis Museum (Malay: Muzium Bugis), formerly known as the Bugis Heritage is a museum established in 1982 dedicated to the Bugis people in Pontian District, Johor, Malaysia. It is the first Bugis museum in Malaysia and there are around 2,000 artifacts displayed inside, such as weapons, clothes, old coins, jewellery and pictures.

== See also ==
- List of museums in Malaysia
