= Baba Nyonya Heritage Museum =

Museum in Melaka Tengah, Malacca, Malaysia

- Muzium Warisan Baba Nyonya
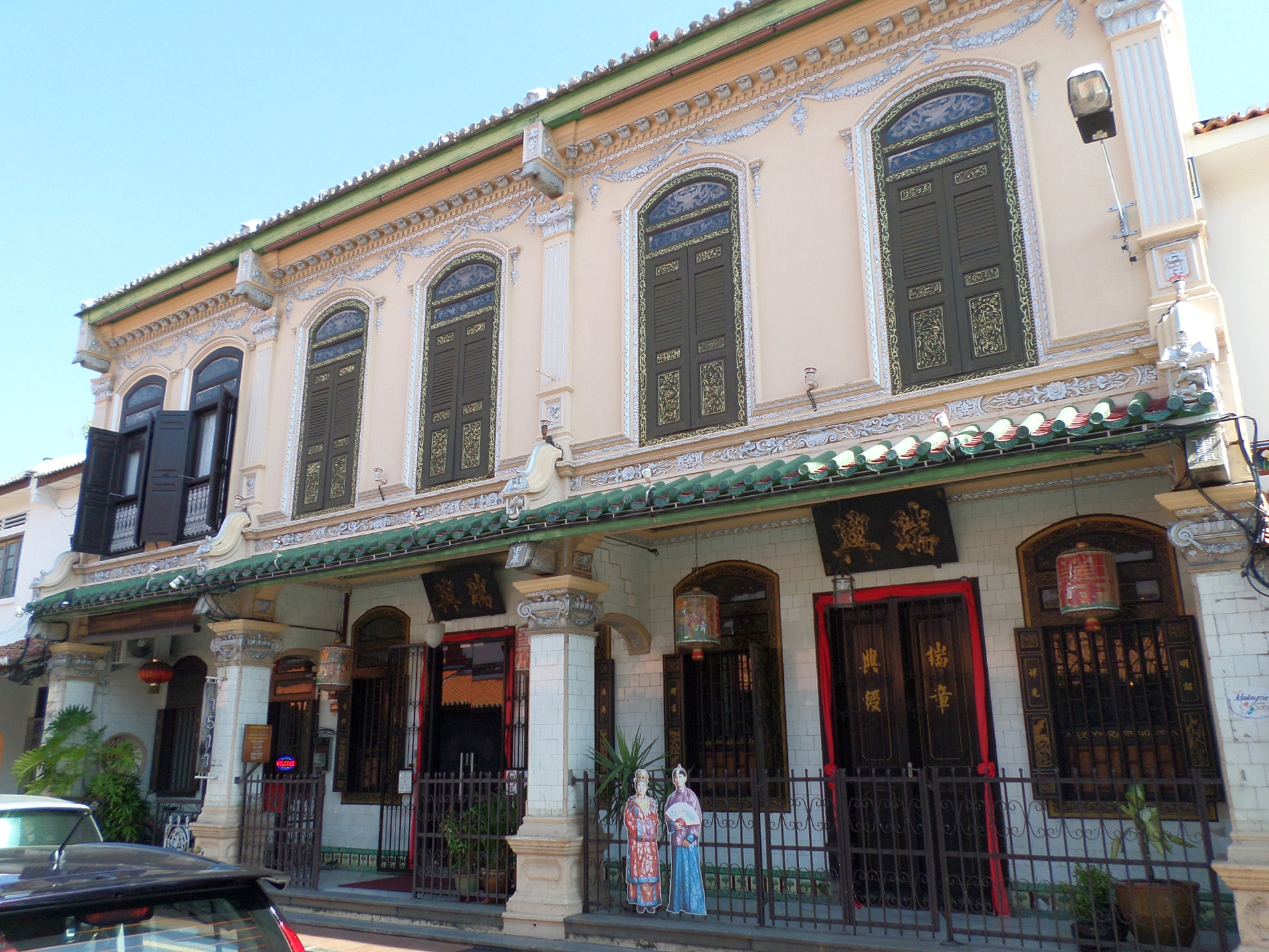
- Established: 1986
- Location: Malacca City, Malacca, Malaysia
- Coordinates: 2.195350°N 102.246700°E
- Type: Museum
- Founder: Chan Kim Lay
- Website: Official website

Baba Nyonya House Museum (Malay: Muzium Warisan Baba Nyonya), also known as the Baba Nyonya Heritage Museum, is a museum in Malacca City, Malacca, Malaysia that showcases the local history of descendants of ethnic Chinese-Malays called Baba-Nyonya or Peranakan in the state. The museum was established in 1986 by Chan Kim Lay, the fourth generation of his family to reside in the large house built by his great-grandfather in 1896 in Jalan Tun Tan Cheng Lock, a street also known as "Millionaire's Row" for its luxurious houses. The museum is known for its elaborate woodwork, furniture, and porcelain.

== See also ==
- List of tourist attractions in Malacca
- List of museums in Malaysia
