= Royal Malaysian Customs Department Museum =

Museum in Melaka Tengah, Malacca, Malaysia

- Muzium Jabatan Kastam Diraja Malaysia
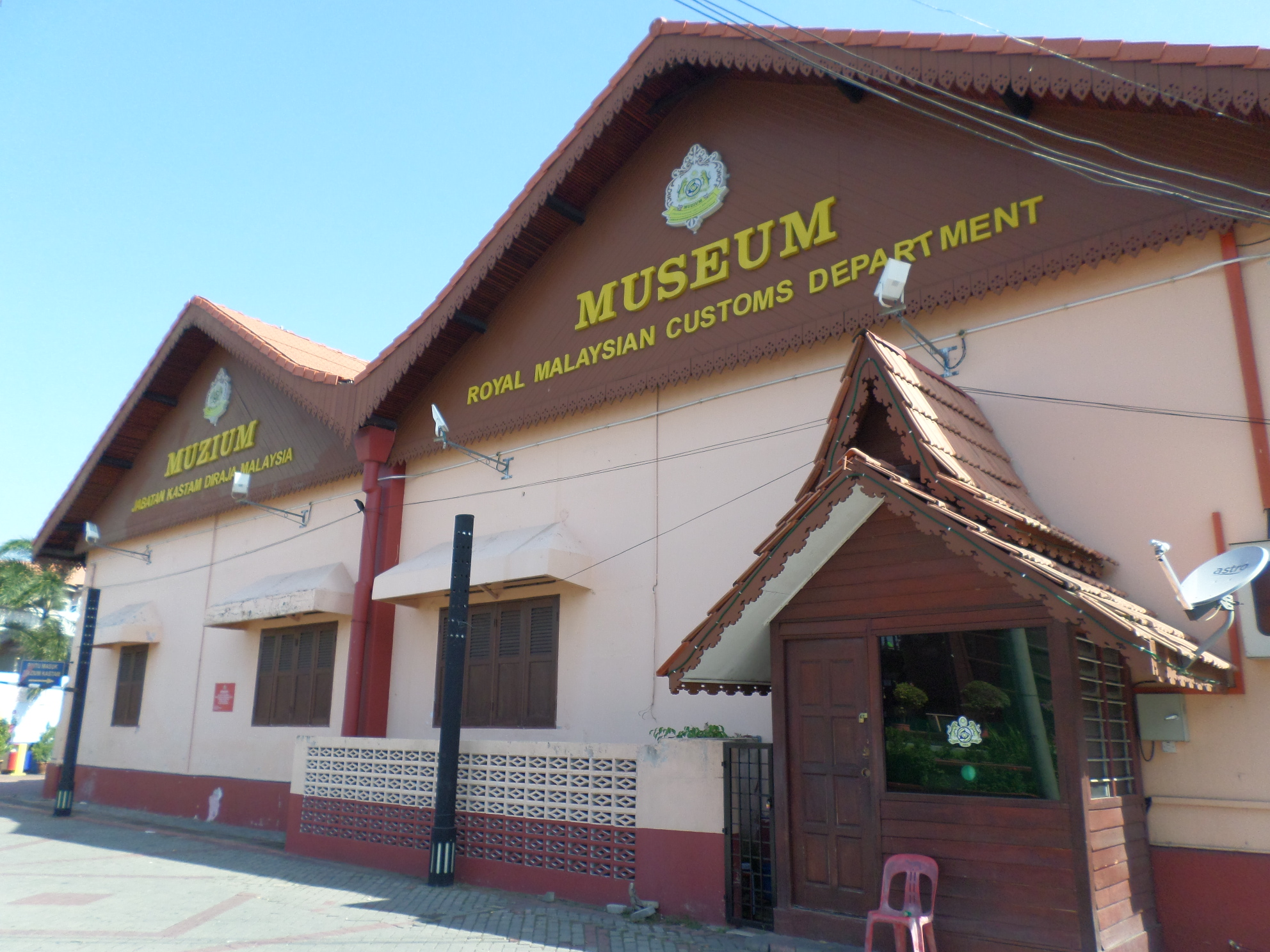
- Established: 25 August 2006
- Location: Malacca City, Malacca, Malaysia
- Coordinates: 2°11′33.5″N 102°14′49.5″E
- Type: museum
- Owner: Royal Malaysian Customs Department

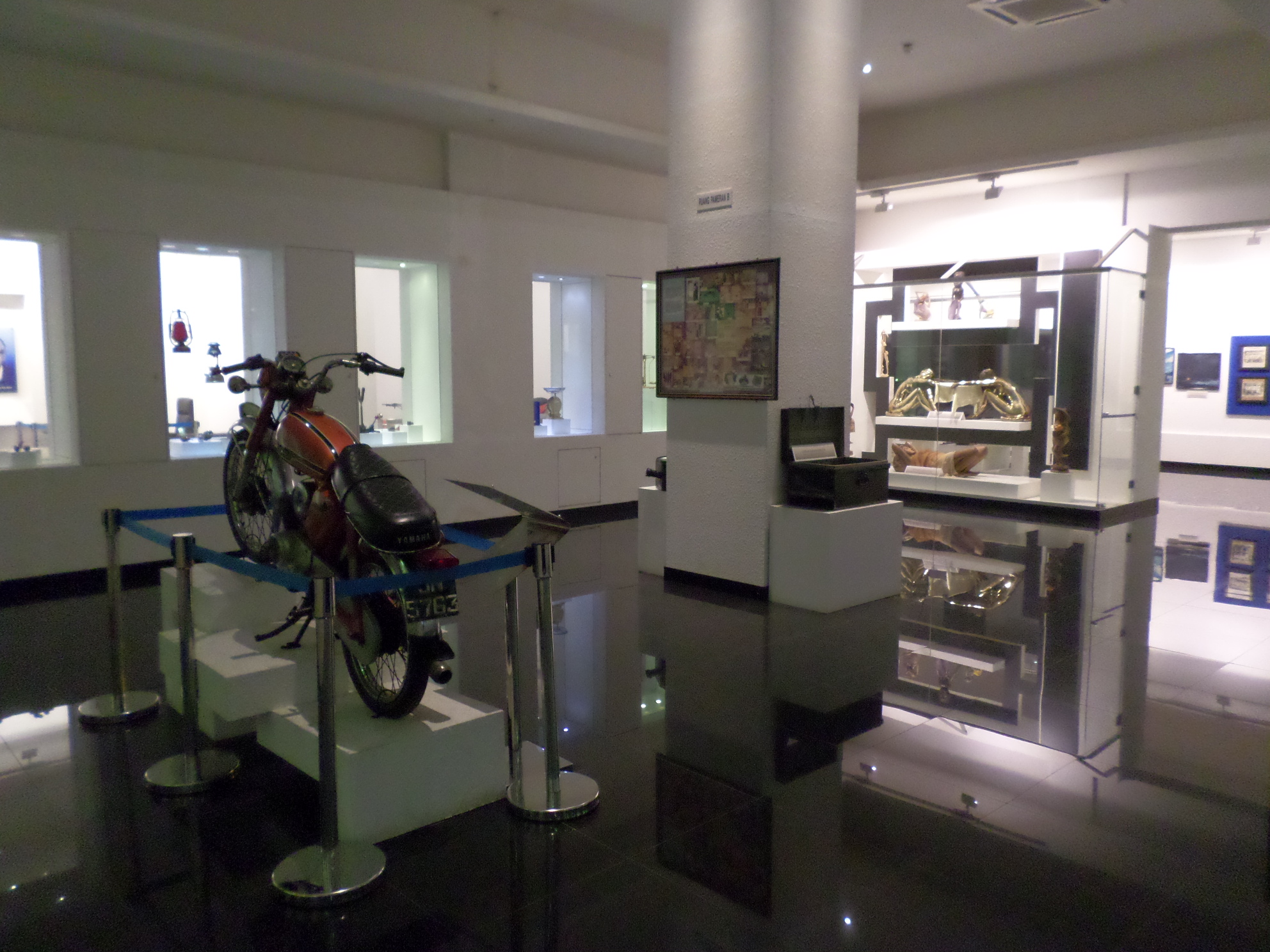
Royal Malaysian Customs Department Museum exhibition hall

The Royal Malaysian Customs Department Museum (Malay: Muzium Jabatan Kastam Diraja Malaysia) is a museum about Royal Malaysian Customs Department in Malacca City, Malacca, Malaysia.

The museum building was constructed under the British government rule in the early 1890s to store imported trade goods and goods for export. Its role as warehouses changed in 2001 when all of the export and import activities were moved to the ports in Kuala Linggi and Sungai Rambai. A portion of the building was converted to the office of the Malacca State Customs Department from the 1950s, until 2003 upon the completion of Wisma Kastam, before finally converted into the present-day Museum and was opened on 25 August 2006 by Malacca Chief Minister Mohd Ali Rustam.

== See also ==
- List of museums in Malaysia
- List of tourist attractions in Malacca
