= Camera Museum =

Museum in Northeast, Penang, Malaysia

- Muzium Kamera
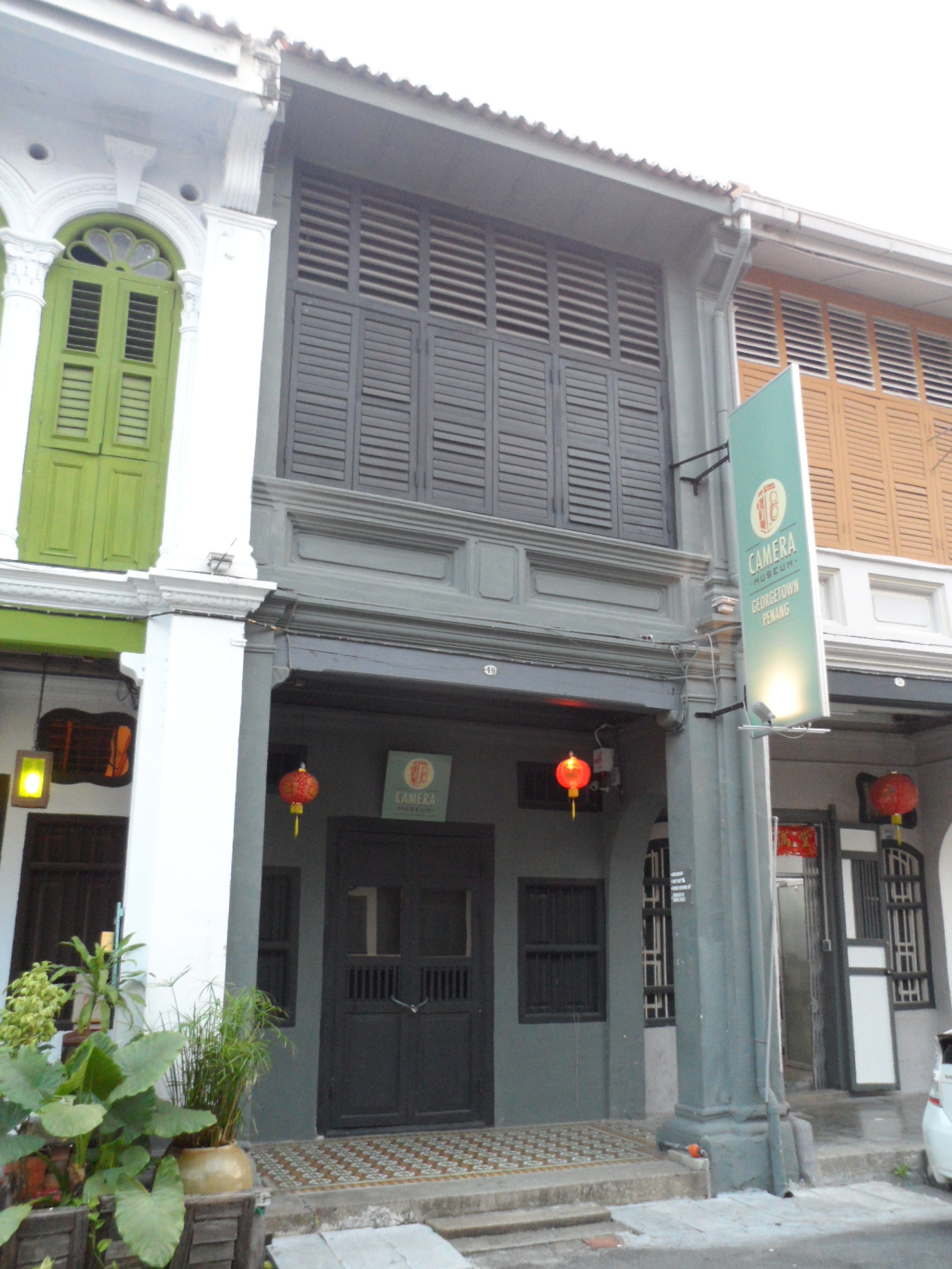

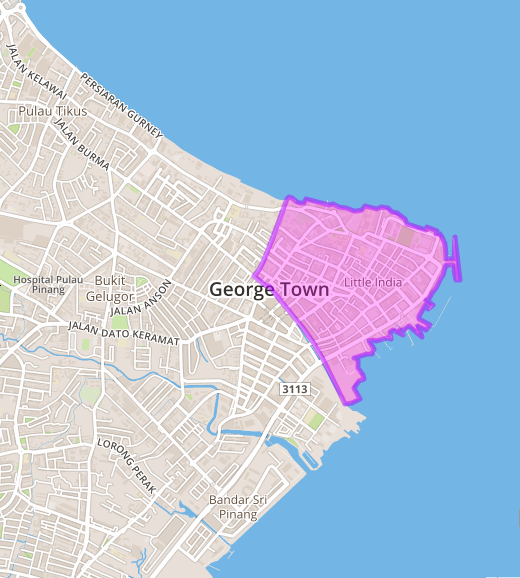
- Location within George Town's UNESCO World Heritage Site (purple)
- Established: 31 August 2013
- Location: George Town, Penang, Malaysia
- Coordinates: 5.41988°N 100.335733°E
- Type: Museum
- Website: www.thecameramuseumpenang.com

UNESCO World Heritage Site
- Type: Cultural
- Criteria: ii, iii, iv
- Designated: 2008 (32nd session)
- Part of: George Town UNESCO Core Zone
- Reference no.: 1223
- Region: Asia-Pacific

The Camera Museum (Malay: Muzium Kamera) is a museum in George Town, Penang, Malaysia.

== History ==
The museum started its operation on 31 August 2013 and was officiated on 9 October 2013 by Penang Chief Minister Lim Guan Eng.

== Architecture ==
The museum is housed in a two-story shop house building with a total floor area of 325 m^{2}, which is divided into Dark Room, Obscura Room and Pinhole Room. It also features a cafe and souvenir shop.

== Exhibition ==
The museum displays up to 1,000 vintage cameras and accessories.

== Events ==
The museum regularly holds exhibition and festival events every month.

== See also ==
- List of museums in Malaysia
