= Sibu Heritage Centre =

Gallery in Sibu, Sarawak, Malaysia

- Muzium Budaya Warisan Sibu
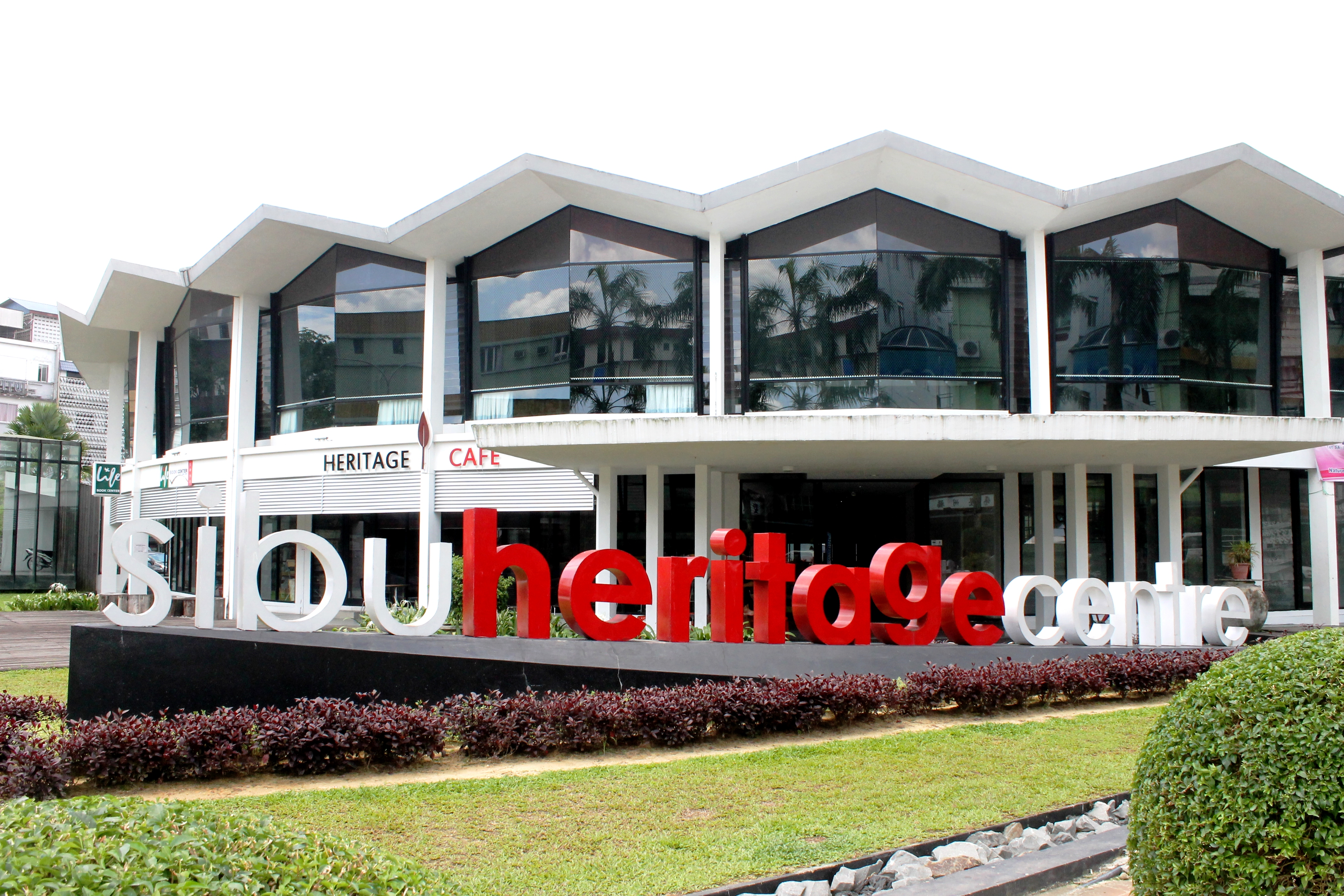
- Established: 2011
- Location: Sibu, Sarawak, Malaysia
- Coordinates: 2°17′22.6″N 111°49′41.3″E
- Type: gallery

The Sibu Heritage Centre (Malay: Muzium Budaya Warisan Sibu) is a gallery in Sibu, Sarawak, Malaysia.

== History ==
The center building was originally constructed in 1963 as the Sibu Municipal Council. In 2002, the council moved out and the building left vacant until 2008. In 2010, the heritage center was relocated from the basement of Sibu Civic Centre to the council building. It then underwent renovation with a cost of more than MYR1.3 million. It was finally opened as Sibu Heritage Council in 2011.

== Architecture ==
The center is housed in the former building of Sibu Municipal Council.

== Exhibitions ==
The center displays the cultural heritage and history of various ethnic groups in central Sarawak. It contains a collection of Chinese porcelain and clay vases.

== See also ==
- List of tourist attractions in Malaysia
