= Malaysian Matriculation Programme =

Pre-university preparatory programme

The Malaysian Matriculation Programme (Malay: Program Matrikulasi Malaysia) is a one-year pre-university preparatory programme offered by the Ministry of Education, Malaysia.

Starting in 2005, the selection process for the Malaysian Matriculation Programme uses a quota system in which 90 per cent of the places are reserved for Bumiputeras, a term referring to the indigenous ethnic groups of Malaysia, while the remaining 10 per cent are allocated to non-Bumiputera students. The quota system is part of government policies to help improve access to higher education for Bumiputera communities. This policy has sparked debate because some non-Bumiputera students who performed well in the Sijil Pelajaran Malaysia (SPM) examination, the national secondary school examination taken at the end of the fifth year, have limited opportunities to enter the programme.

Graduates of the Malaysian Matriculation Programme are awarded the Sijil Matrikulasi KPM by the Ministry of Education, which is fully recognised by all public universities in Malaysia. Although primarily intended for local university admission, the certificate is also accepted by some overseas institutions, particularly in Australia and New Zealand, with recognition varying by country and institution. By comparison, the Sijil Tinggi Persekolahan Malaysia (STPM) is more widely recognised internationally, especially in the United Kingdom, where it is considered comparable to the A-level qualification.

== Eligibility ==
To be eligible for the programme. One has to fulfill the requirements stated based on the grades achieved in the SPM result obtained in the previous year. *indicative results only, varies for different races

For instance:,

Jurusan Sains (Science Stream) :

- Bahasa Melayu - C
- Bahasa Inggeris - C
- Mathematics - B
- Additional Mathematics - C
- Chemistry - C
- Physics or Biology - C
- Sejarah - Pass

Jurusan Kejuruteraan (Engineering Stream):

- Bahasa Melayu - C
- Bahasa Inggeris - C
- Mathematics - B
- Additional Mathematics - C
- Physics - C
- Chemistry - Pass
- Sejarah - Pass
- and C in (1) of these subjects:,

Biology/ Additional Science/ Lukisan Kejuruteraan/ Pengajian Kejuruteraan Awam/ Pengajian Kejuruteraan Mekanikal/ Pengajian Kejuruteraan Elektrik & Elektronik/ Asas Kelestarian/ Pertanian/ Sains Rumah Tangga/ Reka Cipta / Sains Komputer/ Sains Sukan/ Lukisan Kejuruteraan/ Grafik Komunikasi Teknikal/ Prinsip Perakaunan / Ekonomi/ Perdagangan/ Perniagaan

Jurusan Perakaunan (Accounting Stream):

- Bahasa Melayu - C
- Bahasa Inggeris - C
- Mathematics - C
- Sejarah - Pass
- and C in (3) of these subjects:,

Physics / Chemistry / Biology/ Additional Mathematics / Science/ Additional Science/ Lukisan Kejuruteraan/ Asas Kelestarian/ Pertanian/ Sains Rumah Tangga/ Reka Cipta / Sains Komputer/ Sains Sukan/ Lukisan Kejuruteraan/ Grafik Komunikasi Teknikal/ Prinsip Perakaunan/ Ekonomi/ Perdagangan/ Perniagaan/ Pendidikan Syariah Islamiah/ Tasawwur Islam/ Pengajian Kejuruteraan Awam/ Pengajian Kejuruteraan Mekanikal/ Pengajian Kejuruteraan Elektrik & Elektronik

Jurusan Perakaunan Profesional (Professional Accounting Stream) [Bumiputera only]:

- Bahasa Melayu - C
- Bahasa Inggeris - A-
- Mathematics - A
- Additional Mathematics - C
- Sejarah - Pass
- and A in (3) of these subjects:,

Physics/ Chemistry/ Biology/ Science/ Additional Science/ Lukisan Kejuruteraan/ Asas Kelestarian/ Pertanian/ Sains Rumah Tangga/ Reka Cipta / Sains Komputer/ Sains Sukan/ Lukisan Kejuruteraan/ Grafik Komunikasi Teknikal/ Prinsip Perakaunan/ Ekonomi/ Perdagangan/ Perniagaan/ Pendidikan Syariah Islamiah/ Tasawwur Islam/ Pengajian Kejuruteraan Awam/ Pengajian Kejuruteraan Mekanikal/ Pengajian Kejuruteraan Elektrik & Elektronik

- Pass Apititude Test and Interview

== Background ==
Since its inception in the 1980s, the matriculation programme was handled by respective local universities. In 1998, the Matriculation Division was established by the Ministry of Education, Malaysia. The first matriculation programme started in 1999. The selection of potential candidates entering the programme are based on the result of the trial examination for Sijil Pelajaran Malaysia (SPM).

Prior to 2019, seats for matriculation programme has been increased from 25,000 to 40,000 but the 90:10 quota retained, sparking controversy especially among non-Malay political parties and community for marginalizing Sijil Tinggi Persekolahan Malaysia (STPM) candidates.

== Programmes offered ==
Prior to 2006, only one-year programmes are being conducted. Since then, four different programmes are offered. They are One Year Programme (PST, short for Program Satu Tahun in Malay), Two Year Programme (PDT, short for Program Dua Tahun in Malay), Technical Programme and Accounting Programme. Mathematics, Physics, Biology, Chemistry and Informatics Science subjects are conducted in English. Other compulsory subjects are English, Dynamics Skills (Kemahiran Dinamika), Islamic/Moral Study and Information Technology. Students are also required to take up a co-curricular activity of their choice (sports/games, societies/clubs or marching band) during the programme.

=== One Year Programme (PST) ===
PST is a one-year, two-semester programme. Students from science, technical and accounting background can register for this programme. Particularly, for students from science background, there are three different modules to choose from. The subjects offered in the three modules are:

- Module I: Mathematics, Chemistry, Physics and Biology.(sem 1:dinamika)
- Module II: Mathematics, Chemistry, Physics and Computer Science.(sem 1:kokurikulum)
- Module III: Mathematics, Chemistry, Biology and Computer Science.(sem 1:dinamika).

=== Two Year Programme (PDT) ===
PDT is a two-year, four-semester programme.This programme is offered and open only for Bumiputera. If the pupil fail to fulfill the requirements stated for the one-year programme. They have a chance to apply for this. The eligibility is stated as below :-

Jurusan Sains (Science Stream) :

- Bahasa Melayu - C
- Bahasa Inggeris - C
- Mathematics - Pass
- Additional Mathematics - Pass
- Chemistry - Pass
- Physics or Biology - Pass
- Sejarah - Pass

=== Accounting Programme ===
This is a one-year, two-semester programme. The four subjects taught in the accounting module are Mathematics, Accounting, Business Study and Economy.

=== Technical Programme ===
First introduced in academic session 2009/2010, this one-year, four-semester programme is only available for students from technical secondary schools, or students from secondary schools with knowledge and background in engineering technology. Students registered for the technical modules will study four subjects - Mathematics, Chemical Engineering, Physical Engineering and Engineering Study.

== Colleges ==
They are a total of 17 learning institutions in Malaysia that offer the Matriculation Programme. They include 12 matriculation colleges located in various states of Malaysia, two MARA colleges, and three engineering matriculation colleges, that are managed by the Ministry of Education, Malaysia.

=== Matriculation Colleges ===
- Sarawak Matriculation College in Demak Laut, Sarawak. (Kolej Matrikulasi Sarawak)
- Malacca Matriculation College in Alor Gajah, Melaka. (Kolej Matrikulasi Melaka)
- Negeri Sembilan Matriculation College in Kuala Pilah, Negeri Sembilan. (Kolej Matrikulasi Negeri Sembilan)
- Penang Matriculation College in Kepala Batas, Penang. (Kolej Matrikulasi Pulau Pinang)
- Perlis Matriculation College in Arau, Perlis. (Kolej Matrikulasi Perlis)
- Labuan Matriculation College in Merinding, Labuan. (Kolej Matrikulasi Labuan)
- Kelantan Matriculation College in Selising, Kelantan. (Kolej Matrikulasi Kelantan)
- Johor Matriculation College in Tangkak, Johor. (Kolej Matrikulasi Johor)
- Perak Matriculation College in Gopeng, Perak. (Kolej Matrikulasi Perak)
- Kedah Matriculation College in Changlun, Kedah. (Kolej Matrikulasi Kedah)
- Selangor Matriculation College in Banting, Selangor. (Kolej Matrikulasi Selangor)
- Pahang Matriculation College in Gambang, Pahang. (Kolej Matrikulasi Pahang)

=== MARA Colleges ===
- Kuala Nerang MARA College in Kuala Nerang, Padang Terap, Kedah. (Kolej MARA Kuala Nerang)
- Kulim MARA College in Kulim, Kedah. (Kolej MARA Kulim)

=== Engineering Matriculation Colleges ===
- Kedah Engineering Matriculation College in Pendang, Kedah. (Kolej Matrikulasi Kejuruteraan Kedah)
- Pahang Engineering Matriculation College in Bandar Tun Abdul Razak, Jengka, Pahang. (Kolej Matrikulasi Kejuruteraan Pahang)
- Johor Engineering Matriculation College in Pontian, Johor. (Kolej Matrikulasi Kejuruteraan Johor)
