= LFX =

LFX may refer to:

- 3.6 L variant of GM High Feature V6 engine
- A variant of the Nova Bus LF Series designed for bus rapid transit applications
- The Lexus LF-X
- Live fire exercise
- Labuan Financial Exchange
- Low profile form factor, a form factor of power supply unit (computer)
- A suite of tools built by the Linux Foundation to facilitate every aspect of open source development.
