= Kuraman Island =

Island of Labuan, Malaysia

Kuraman/Keraman/Mompracem Island
Native name: Pulau Kuraman/Keraman
- Interactive map of Kuraman/Keraman/Mompracem Island

Geography
- Location: Labuan Marine Park
- Coordinates: 5°13′26.4″N 115°07′55.2″E
- Archipelago: Borneo (Greater Sunda Islands)
- Adjacent to: South China Sea

Administration
- Malaysia
- Federal Territory: Labuan

Kuraman Island or Keraman Island (Malay: Pulau Kuraman), formerly named as Mompracem, is an island located within the Labuan Federal Territory of Malaysia on the northern mouth of Brunei Bay. It is one of the six Labuan islands, apart from Burung, Daat, Papan, Great Rusukan, and Little Rusukan. With a size of 1.47 square kilometres (0.57 sq mi), it forms part of the Labuan Marine Park together with the latter two islands of Great Rusukan and Little Rusukan.

The island has two main beaches and is noted for its fishing, wreck diving site, long sand spit and pleasant tropical island atmosphere. The interior is forested with a range of timbers and contains cleared paths for jungle walks. In recent years, large storms have contributed to increased erosion resulting in several areas of vegetation and numerous buildings being washed into the sea.

== Etymology ==
The island was featured in a 1594 Dutch Voorcompagnieën (a predecessor of the Dutch East India Company (VOC)) cartographer map of the East Indies based on the voyage of Petrus Plancius in the South China Sea coast of northern Borneo with Kuraman labelled as Mon Pracem/Mompracem/Mōpracam, Labuan as Pulo Tigao/Putigao/Tigaon, and Tiga as Pulo Tiga. The older name of Mompracem was also used by Italian writer Emilio Salgari to refer to the island in his fictional character of Sandokan and subsequent novel naming of The Tigers of Mompracem. Under the British administration, the local name of Kuraman were used.

== History ==
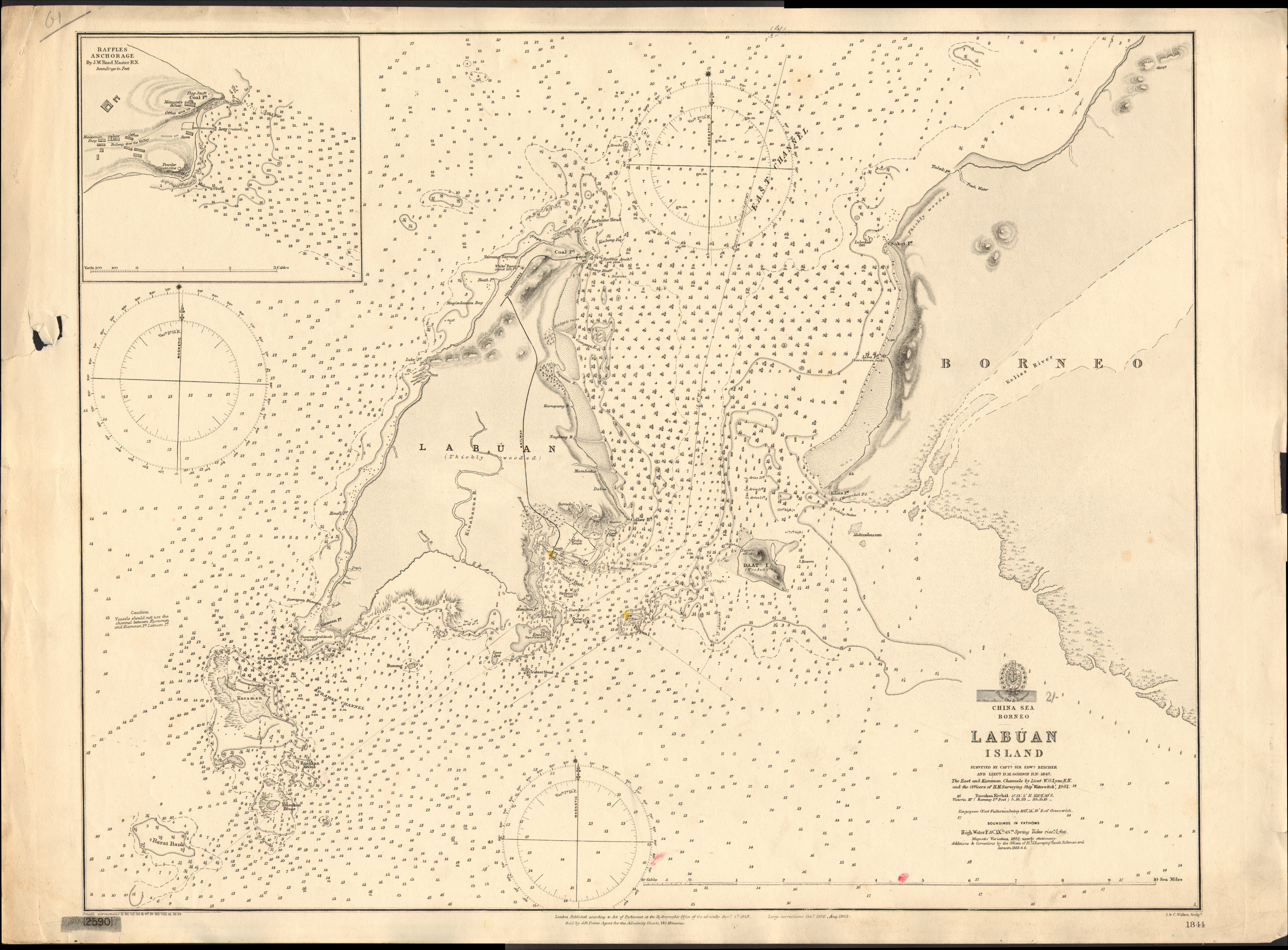
An 1848 British Admiralty Chart, featuring the island of Kuraman on the bottom left within the Crown Colony of Labuan

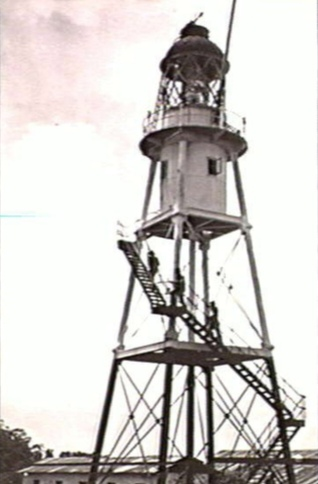
The British lighthouse, photographed in 1945 during a bomb-clearing mission

Along with Labuan and most of the islands in northern Borneo, Kuraman was once under the thalassocracy of the Sultanate of Brunei. The island was ceded to the British through the Treaty of Labuan with the Sultanate of Brunei on 18 December 1846. A lighthouse, built by the British between 1897–1913, is situated on the highest point of the island. In the surrounding waters off Kuraman there are several known shipwrecks including the Dutch Steamer SS De Klerk and a minesweeper, the USS Salute (AM-294), both sunk during the Second World War.

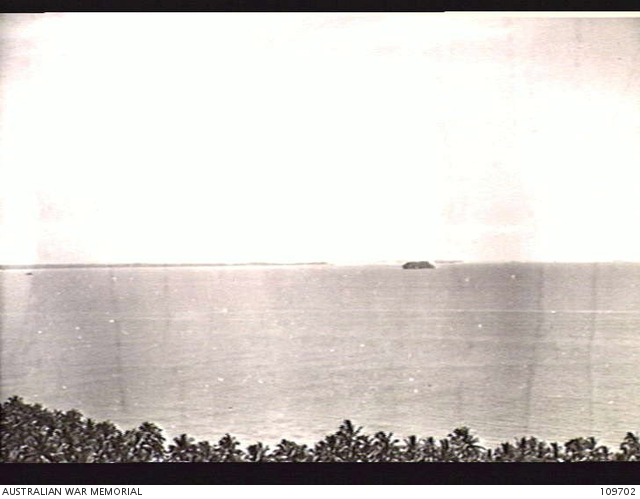
West Coast view

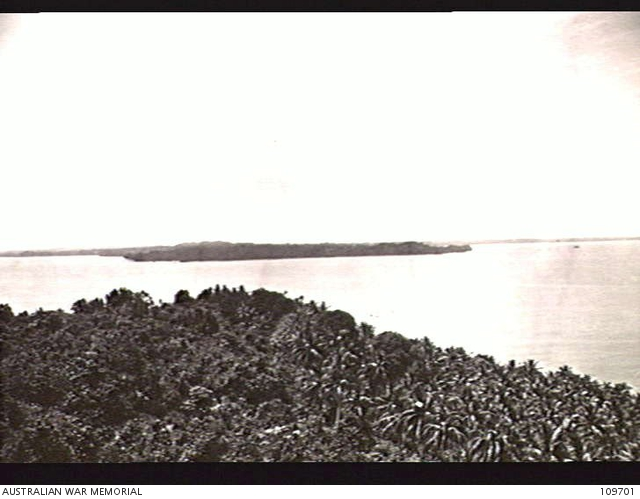
South Coast view

The island panoramic view from its lighthouse on 18 June 1945, after the liberation by the 2nd Australian Imperial forces (AIF)

Kuraman, like the rest of British North Borneo, was captured by the Japanese during this period and was liberated by the 2nd AIF of the Australian Army in 1945, although no fighting ever occurred on the island. By 1946, the Crown Colony of Labuan was incorporated into the Crown Colony of North Borneo. Towards the formation of the Malaysian federation in 1963, the island, together with Labuan, remained under the administration of the Sabah government. Two other major shipwrecks can be found in the area: the MV Tung Hwuang, a freighter that sank in the 1980s while transporting cement to Brunei for the Sultan's new palace, and the MV Mabini Padre, a trawler from the Philippines which caught fire and sank in 1981. In 1984, it became part of the Labuan Federal Territories following the cession of the main island by the Sabah government under the Sabah People's United Front (BERJAYA) Chief Minister Harris Salleh to the Malaysian federal government under Barisan National (BN) Prime Minister Mahathir Mohamad.

In 2004 a group of expatriates from neighbouring Brunei contemplated building a bar/clubhouse for divers, despite facing with various legal complications. The same group then announced plans to develop the island and to declare independence or greater self-government, claiming a perceived dubious Malaysian sovereignty on the island resulting from a conflicting historical Bruneian claim to the island and its surrounding. This went as far as designing a flag for the island, similar to the many unofficial flags which have originated in varying areas around the globe. This was however taken lightheartedly by both the governments of Malaysia and Brunei and looked upon as a form of micronationalism.

== Geography ==
Kuraman features a long sandspit leading out into the waters of Brunei Bay. The British once described the island as covered mostly by trees. The island lies on the southern side of the Kiamsan Point of Labuan Island. Its sandy beaches became the nesting area for green turtles and several sea bird as well as butterfly species. The Megapodius lowi (scrubfowl) is chiefly confined to the island, despite its nests mostly being found on the Labuan main island. Between the channel separating the island and the cape point lies a rock called the Sunken Rock.

== Demographics ==
Before it was gazetted as a Malaysian Marine Park, around 80 refugee families resided on the island under the United Nations High Commissioner for Refugees (UNHCR), with two main settlements known as Kampung Warisan (Warisan Village) and Kampung Singgahmata (Singgahmata Village). Until present, it is populated by the predominantly illegal immigrants from the Philippines, who claim to be a local Malay community, with a small village that includes a bar which serves food and is locally known for its Western cuisine such as french fries and fried chicken.

== Economy ==
During the British administration, the island was described as fertile, which is suitable for agricultural purposes. The island area is currently part of the future Labuan secondary economic development zone, which gives priority to the preservation of agricultural areas, rural settlements, and coastal and heritage tourism areas, including residential areas.

== Transportation ==
The island has no roads or vehicles and it can only be reached by boat. There is a small private jetty and a new larger government pier which assist in providing access. The operation of small water vessels within the island waters is subject to regulation under the State Ports and Harbours Enactment 2002.

== See also ==
- List of islands of Malaysia
