= KML (disambiguation) =

KML or kml may refer to:

- Kemsley railway station (National Rail station code), Kent, England
- Keyhole Markup Language, an XML geospatial data file format
- Korean Mountaineering League, an organization that focuses on the conservation of Korea's mountain environments
- Lesser Poland Railways a regional rail operator in the Lesser Poland Voivodeship of Poland
- Korvpalli Meistriliiga, the Estonian Basketball League
- Labuan Matriculation College (Malay: Kolej Matrikulasi Labuan)
