= Chimney Museum =

Museum in Labuan, Malaysia

- Muzium Chimney
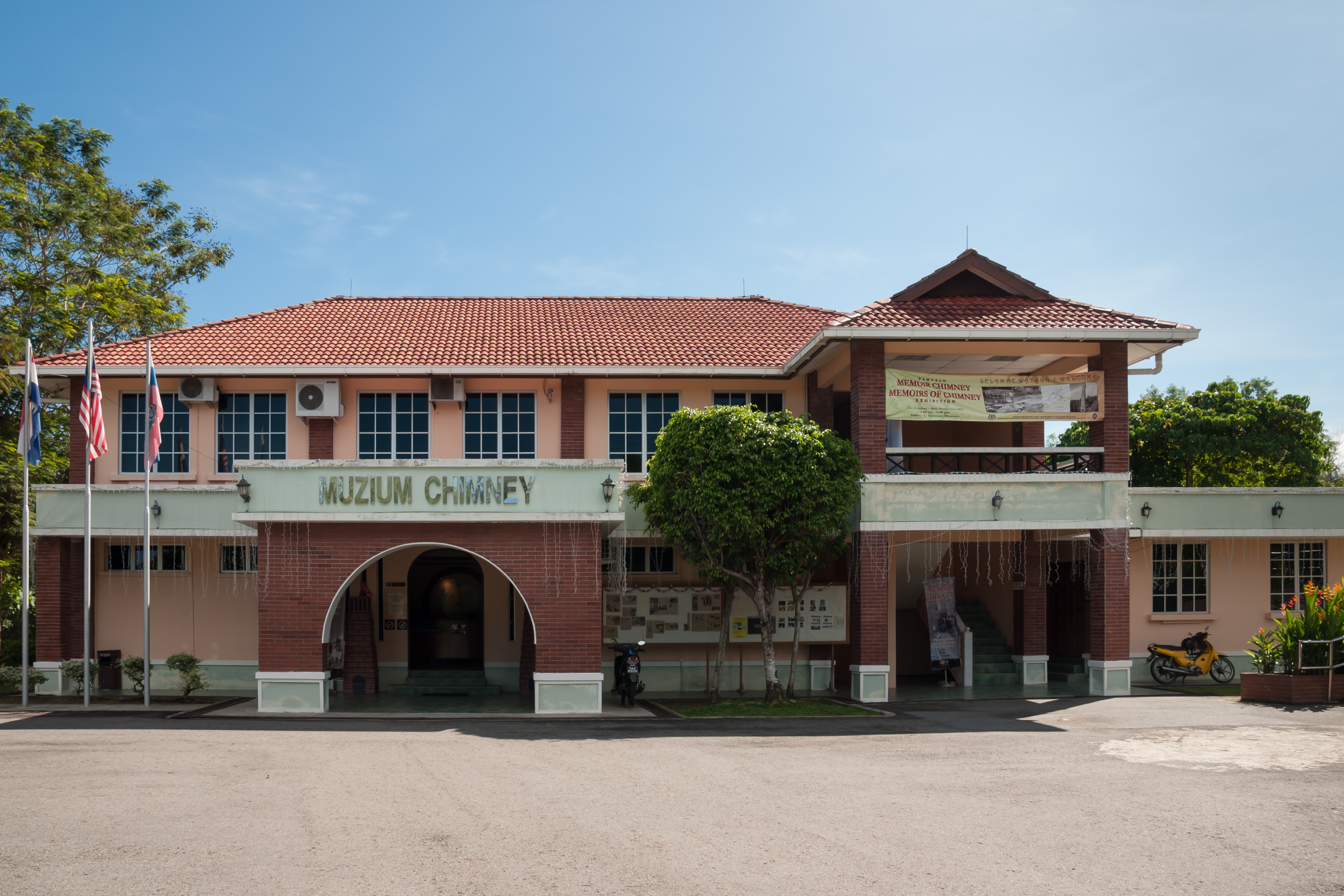
- Established: 2002
- Location: Kubong, Labuan, Malaysia
- Coordinates: 05°22′50″N 115°14′56″E
- Type: museum

The Chimney Museum (Malay: Muzium Chimney) is a museum in Kubong, Labuan, Malaysia. The museum details the history of Kubong when coal mining was at its peak under the administration of the British North Borneo Chartered Company.

== History ==
The area around the museum used to be a major coal mining site during the British North Borneo administration from 1847 until 1911. During archaeological digging work was done in 1997, archaeologists found 12 layers of bricks beneath the chimney. Also in the same year, soil work was carried out to stabilise and reinforce the structure of the chimney and also restoration to its original structure. The museum was officially opened in 2002. The museum has received the International Green Apple Awards for Environmental Best Practice and Sustainable Development 2013 awards for its historical architecture style.

== Architecture ==
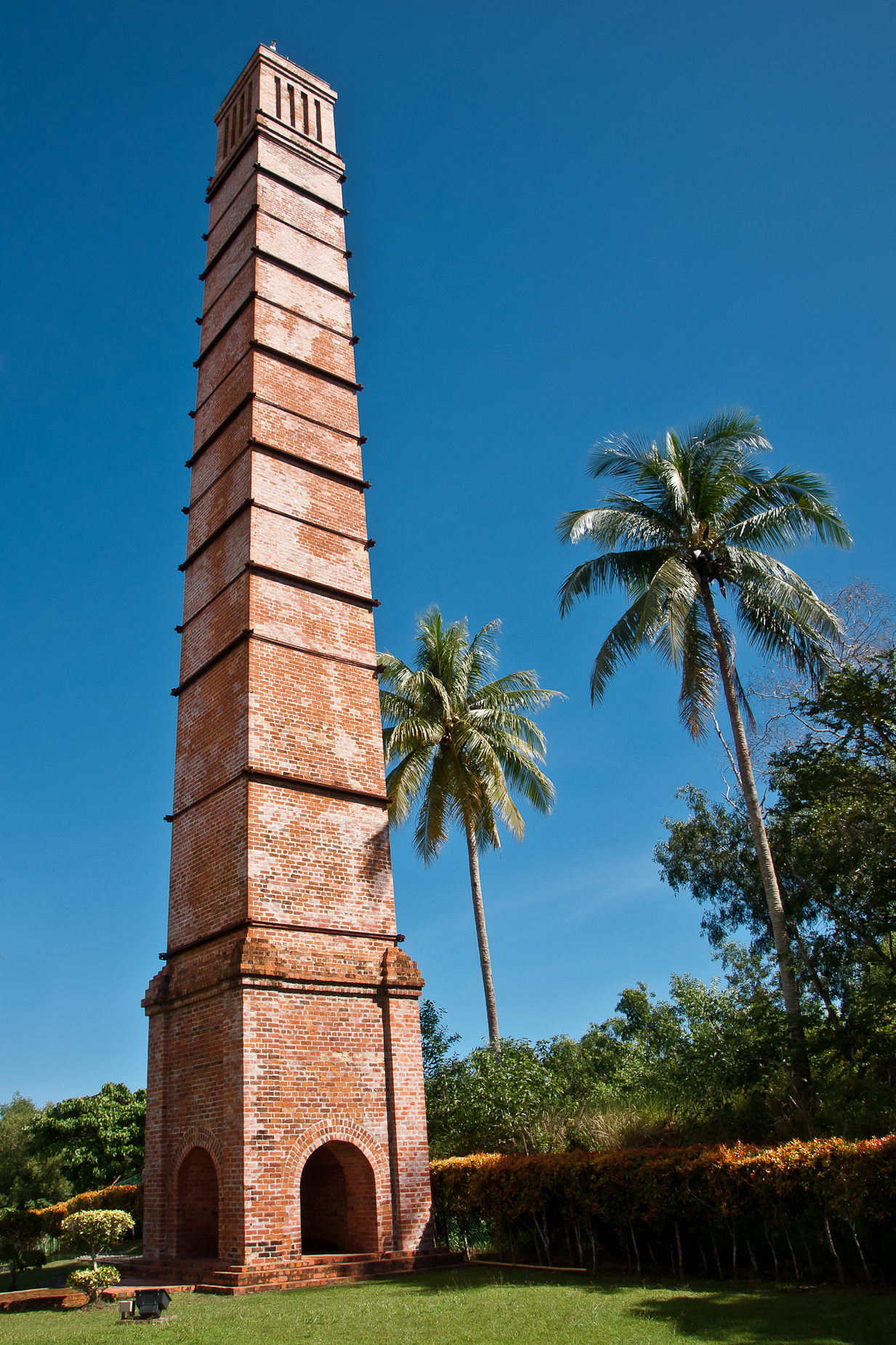
The Chimney Tower located beside the museum.

The museum also features a chimney tower which is a remaining from the previous coal mining activities in the area. Built in the early 1900s, the chimney is a rectangular-shape structure with 32 metres in height. It is fully built by red bricks counted up to 23,000 pieces which were imported from the United Kingdom. It has a British architectural style. There is a hole and two arch-shaped doors facing west and south inside the chimney. The real function of the chimney has not been fully determined up until today. Although there is a suggestion that it might have functioned as an observation deck, from which information about incoming ships could be broadcast to Victoria Harbour and Labuan town using an optical telegraph system known as semaphore.

== Exhibition ==
The museum consists of seven galleries and one discovery room, including history of coal mining around the world, coal mining location around Malaysia, process and methods in coal mining, coal specimen, mining tools etc.

== Opening time ==
The museum opens everyday from 8:00 a.m. to 5:00 p.m. free of charge.

== See also ==
- List of museums in Malaysia
- Mining in Malaysia
