= Labuan Maritime Museum =

Museum in Labuan, Malaysia

- Muzium Marin Labuan
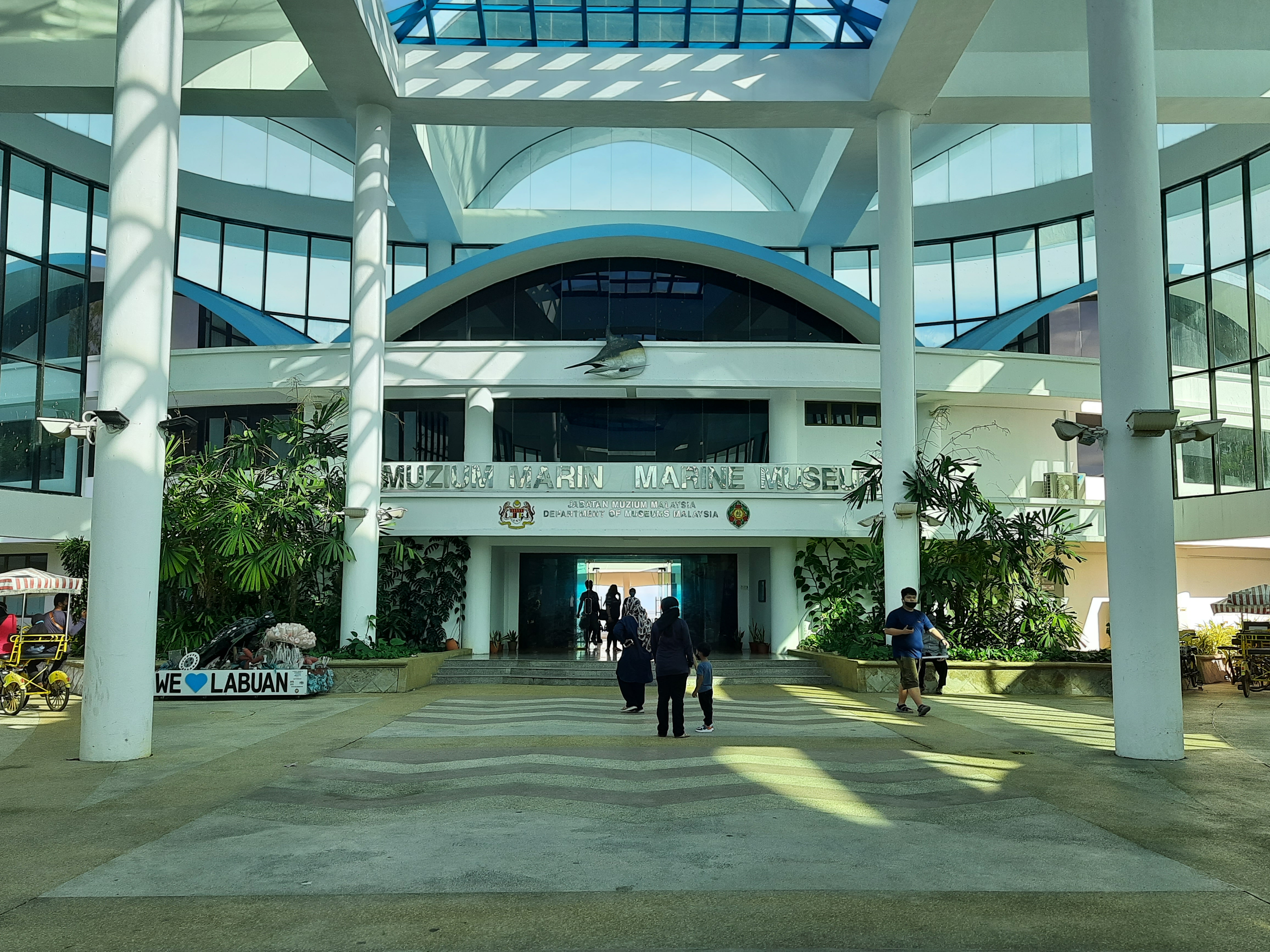
- Front exterior of the Labuan Maritime Museum
- Established: January 26, 2003
- Location: Labuan, Malaysia
- Type: Museum
- Collections: Marine specimens, fishing tools, diving gear, and oceanography technologies.
- Collection size: 572
- Parking: Outside the Labuan International Sea Sports Complex (No charge)

The Labuan Maritime Museum (Malay: Muzium Marin Labuan) is a museum located within the International Sea Sports Complex in Labuan, Malaysia. The museum supplies visitors with knowledge on marine lives found in Bornean waters, particularly in Labuan.

== History ==
The museum first opened on 26 January 2003. It was officiated by the then Minister of Tourism, Arts and Culture, Tan Sri Datuk Seri Panglima Abdul Kadir bin Sheikh Fadzir.

Plans for the museum first came to be in the 1990s. But construction of the museum was done between August 2001 and July 2002 after a space was offered by the Labuan Corporation within the Labuan International Sea Sports Complex.

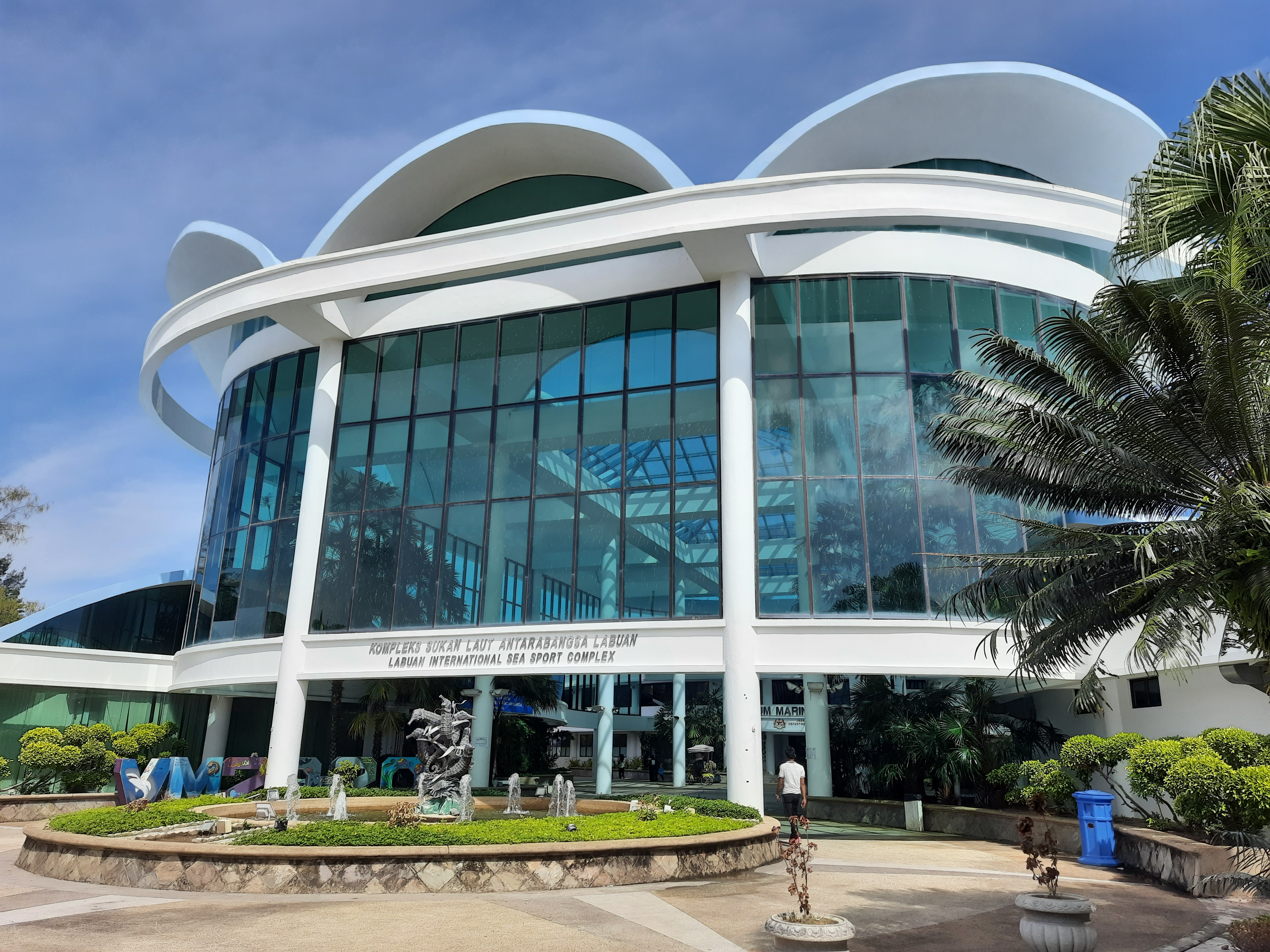
The Labuan Maritime Museum in located within the Labuan International Sea Sports Complex.

== Architecture ==
The museum is housed in a two-story shell-shaped building. It is divided into 16 galleries.

== Exhibitions ==
The lower level of the museum exhibits local fish species in Labuan and information on the famed shipwrecks located within its waters, including sections on fish and corals. 14 aquariums and a touch pool are also placed within this level.

The upper level displays information on the biodiversity of coral reefs, invertebrate marine animals and other marine life. Exhibitions featuring diving gears, traditional and modern fishing tools, as well as fishing devices for dangerous creatures are also located here.

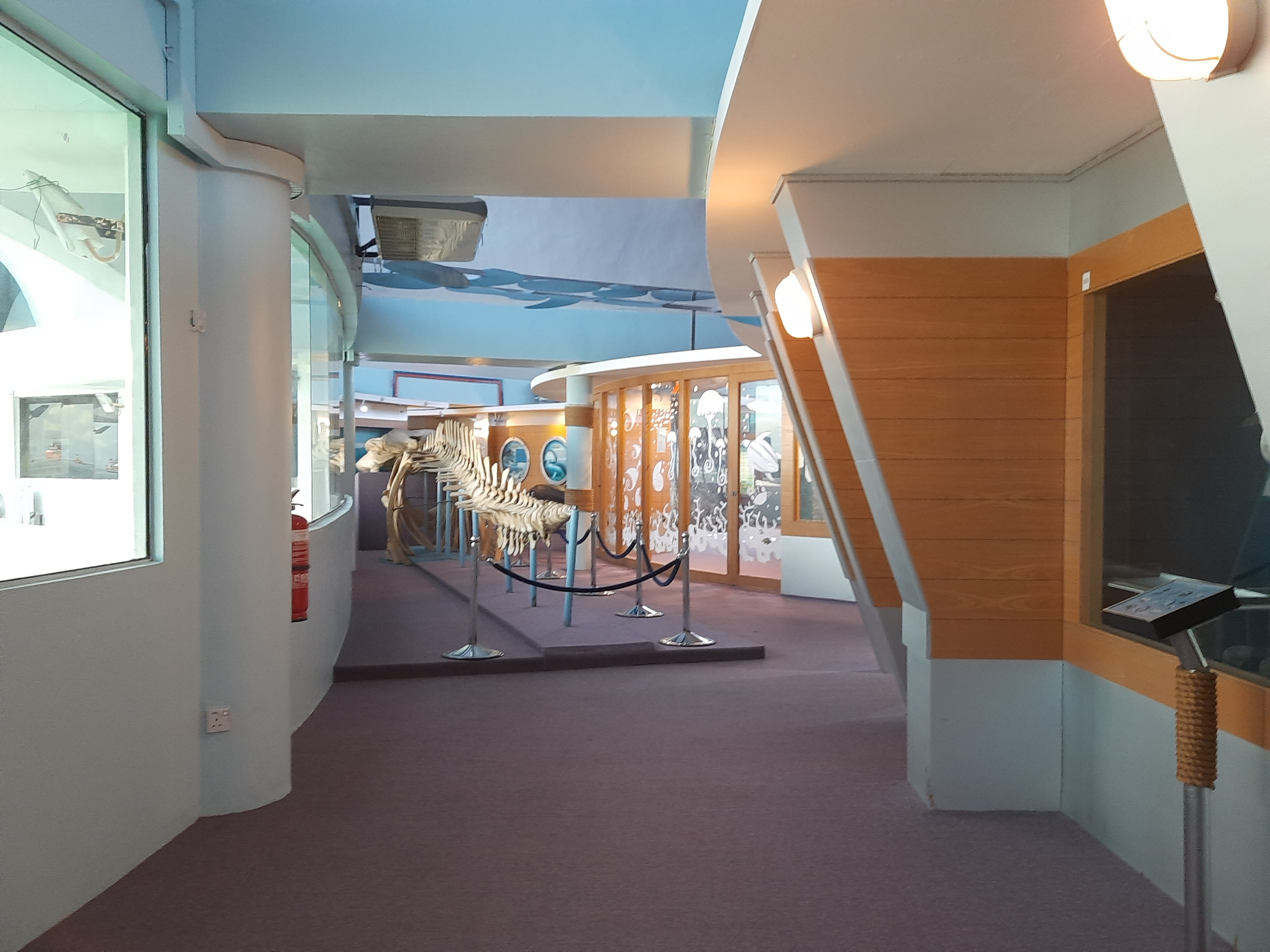
Inside the Labuan Maritime Museum (Upper level).

== Operating time ==
The museum is open every day, except during Eid Al-Fitr's first two days and the first day of Eid Al-Adha. Operating times are from 9.00 a.m. to 6.00 p.m. and entry is free of charge.

== See also ==
- List of museums in Malaysia
