= Daat Island =

Island of Labuan, Malaysia

Native name: Pulau Daat
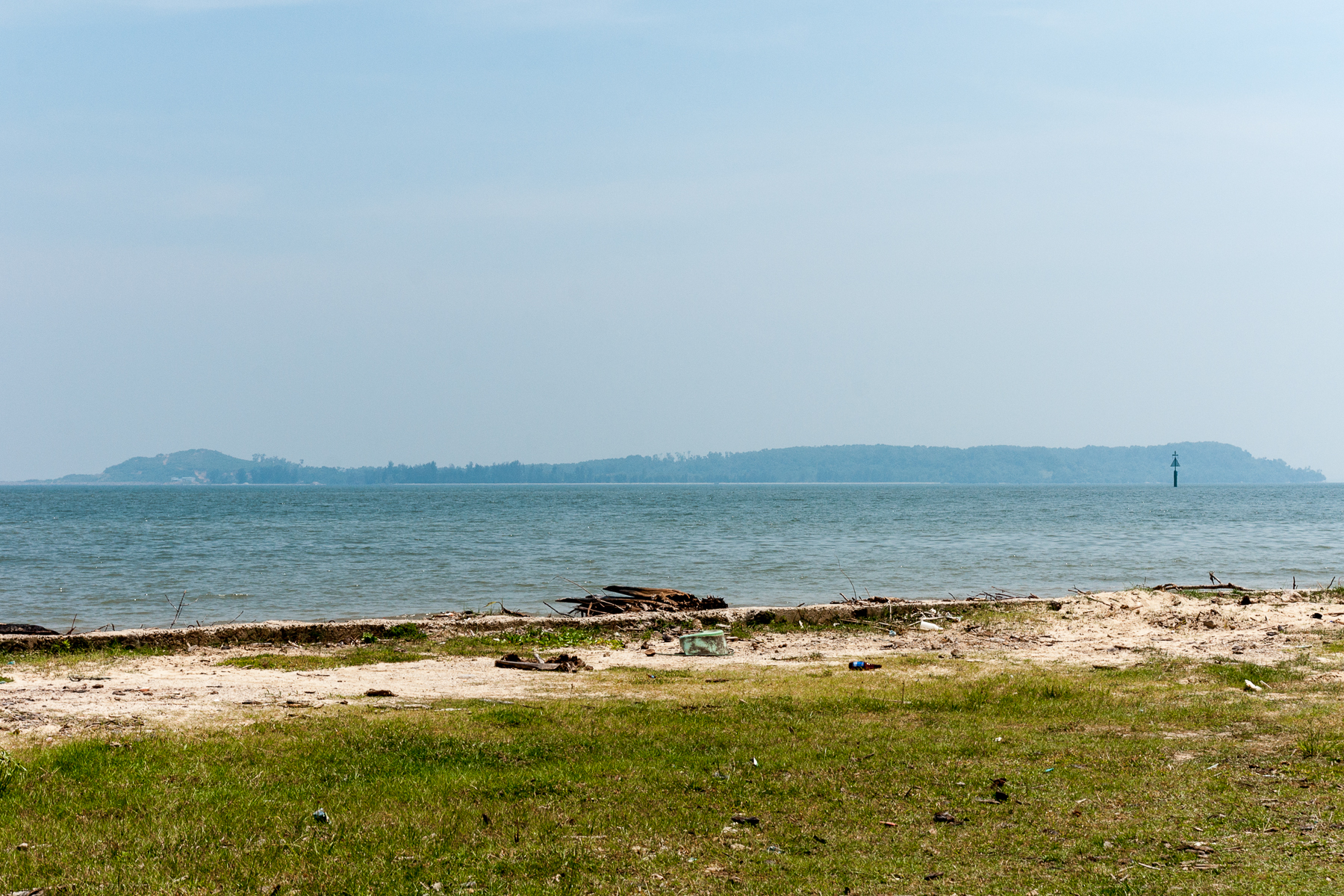
- Interactive map of Daat Island

Geography
- Location: South China Sea
- Coordinates: 5°16′25.0″N 115°19′05.1″E
- Total islands: 1
- Area: 2.4 km^{2} (0.93 sq mi)

Administration
- Malaysia
- Federal territory: Labuan

The Daat Island (Malay: Pulau Daat) is an island in Labuan, Malaysia.

== History ==
In 1856, Labuan Governor George Warren Edwardes issued a grant to John Gavaron Treacher and Clarence Cooper to be the owner of the island. Since then, the island has been owned by several different people. In 2019, 17 ship passengers were stranded on the island en route to Labuan. On 30 June 2021, the island was planned to be put into auction, but it was rescheduled to 10 September 2021. It was then rescheduled again on 27 May 2022. The island auction reserved price was MYR121.5 million.

== Geography ==
The island spans over an area of 2.4 km^{2}.

== See also ==
- List of islands of Malaysia
