= Labuan =

Island federal territory of Malaysia

- Federal territory
- Federal Territory of Labuan; Wilayah Persekutuan Labuan
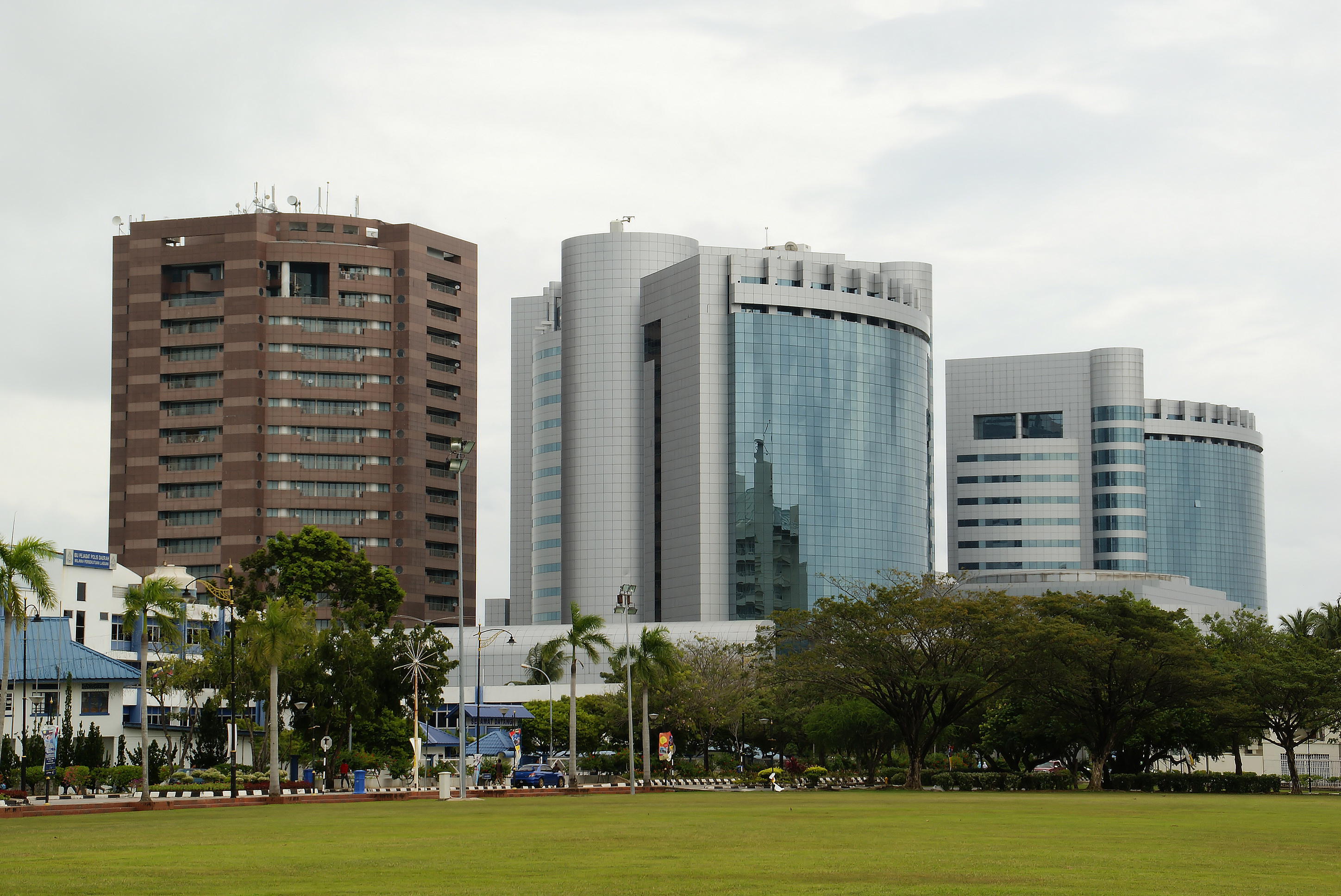
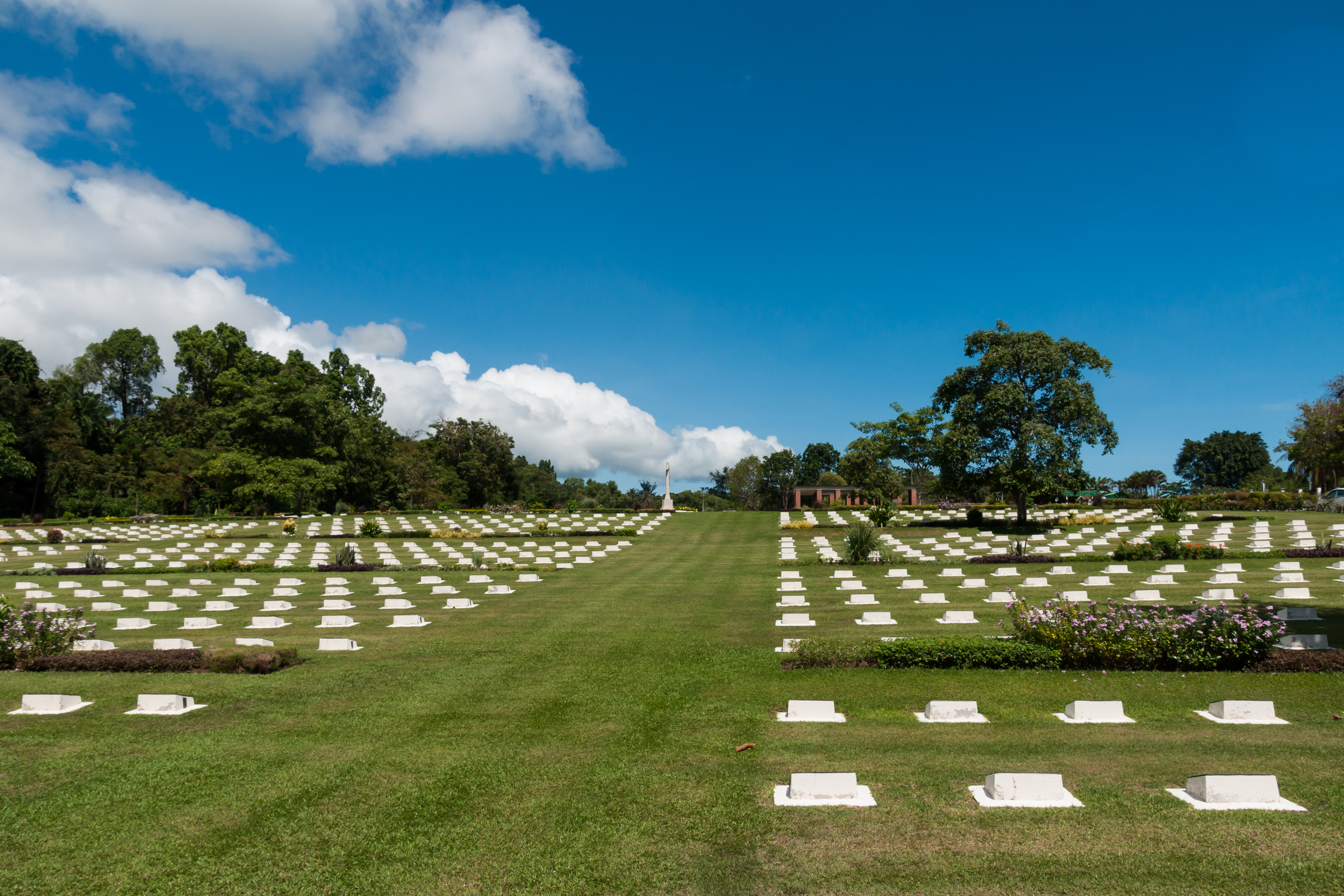
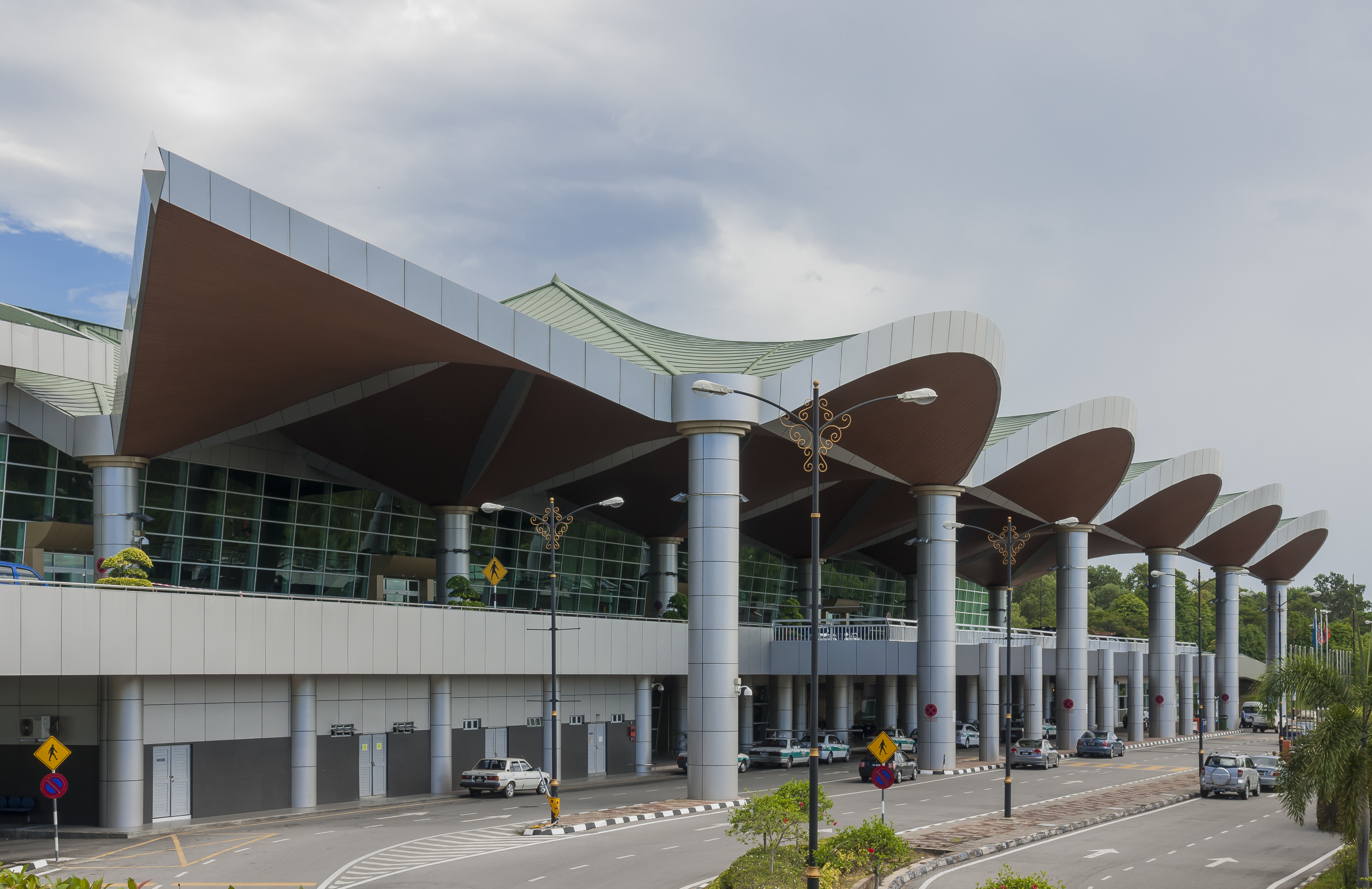
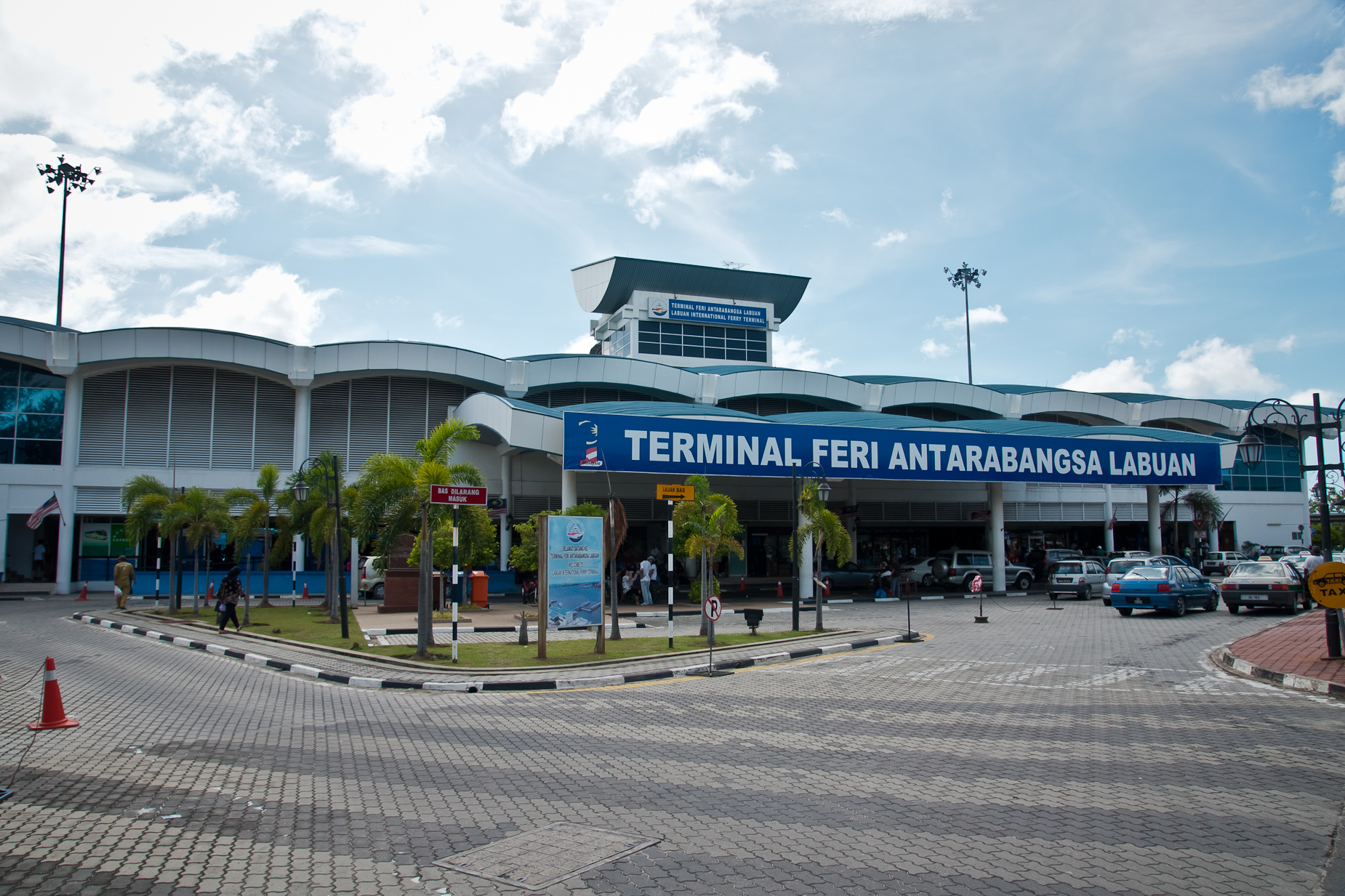
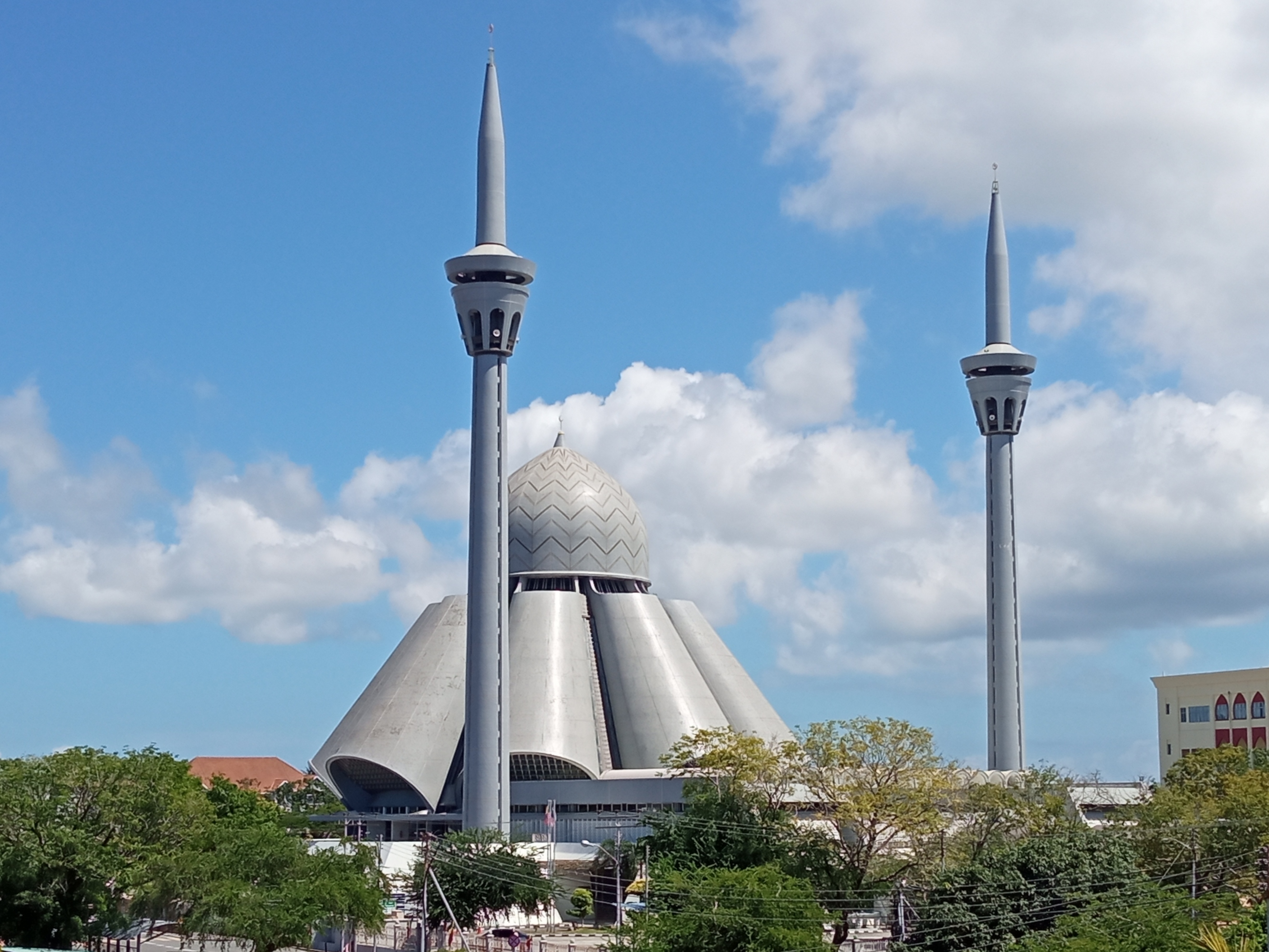
- From top, left to right: Labuan Financial Park complex, Labuan War Cemetery, Labuan Airport, and Labuan Ferry Terminal, Labuan state mosque

- Flag Seal
- Nickname: Pulau Mutiara Borneo ("The Pearl of Borneo")
- Labuan in Malaysia
- Interactive map of Labuan
- Coordinates: 05°18′00″N 115°13′12″E
- Country: Malaysia
- Capital: Victoria

Government
  - Type: Direct federal administration
  - Administered by: Labuan Corporation
  - Chairman: Mohd Husni bin Mohamad Salleh
  - CEO of Labuan Corporation: Rithuan Mohd Ismail

Area
  - Total: 92 km^{2} (36 sq mi)

Population (Q2 2025)
  - Total: 137,640
  - Density: 1,500/km^{2} (3,900/sq mi)

Human Development Index
  - HDI (2024): 0.847 (very high) (5th)
- Time zone: UTC+8 (MST)
  - Summer (DST): UTC+8 (Not observed)
- Postal code: 87xxx
- Area code: 087
- Vehicle registration: L SL (before becoming FT)
- Website: pl.gov.my

Labuan (/ləˈbuːən/), officially the Federal Territory of Labuan (Malay: Wilayah Persekutuan Labuan), is an island federal territory of Malaysia. It includes Labuan Island and six smaller islands off the coast of the state of Sabah in East Malaysia. Labuan's capital is Victoria, which is best known as an offshore financial centre offering international financial and business services via Labuan IBFC since 1990, as well as being an offshore support hub for deepwater oil and gas activities in the region. It is also a tourist destination for people travelling through Sabah, nearby Bruneians, and scuba divers. The name Labuan derives from the Malay word labuhan, which means 'harbour'.

== History ==
Historical affiliations

Sultanate of Brunei 15th century–1846
United Kingdom 1846–1848
Labuan Crown 1848–1941
• British North Borneo 1890–1904
• United Kingdom 1904–1906
• Straits Settlements 1907–1941
Empire of Japan 1942–1945
British North Borneo Crown 1946–1963
Malaysia 1963–present

For three centuries from the 15th century, the north and west coast of Borneo including the island of Labuan was part of the Sultanate of Brunei. In 1775, Labuan was temporarily occupied by the British East India Company after the failure of the company's station at Balambangan Island. The Sultan of Brunei, Omar Ali Saifuddin I tried to secure the British East India Company's support against the Sulu raiders by offering Labuan as an alternative to Balambangan but, instead the company made a second but failed attempt to set up a station on Balambangan. The Sultan's subsequent reoffering of Labuan to the company did not result in the establishment of a permanent British settlement on the island either.

British policy changed in the 19th century, when Labuan started to attract British interest again. Captain Rodney Mundy acquired the island for Britain through the Treaty of Labuan with the Sultan of Brunei, Omar Ali Saifuddin II on 18 December 1846. Mundy took Pengiran Mumin to witness the island's accession to the British Crown on 24 December 1846. Some sources state that during the signing of the treaty, the Sultan had been threatened by a British navy warship ready to fire on the Sultan's palace if he refused to sign the treaty while another source says the island was ceded to Britain as a reward for assistance in combating pirates.

The main reason why the British acquired the island was to establish a naval station to protect their commercial interest in the region and to suppress piracy in the South China Sea. The British also believed the island could be the next Singapore. Following the Anglo-Brunei Treaty of Friendship in 1847, which distilled the aforementioned events into a single document - Labuan was ceded to the British in perpetuity. The island became a Crown Colony in 1848 with James Brooke appointed as the first governor and commander-in-chief, with William Napier as his lieutenant-governor. In 1849, the Eastern Archipelago Company became the first of several British companies to try to exploit Labuan coal deposits. The company was formed to exploit coal deposits on the island and adjacent coast of Borneo but soon became involved in a dispute with James Brooke. Not proving itself a great commercial or strategic asset, administration of Labuan was handed to the British North Borneo Company in 1890. The North Borneo Company did not prove that effective a manager either, and in 1904 Malcolm Stewart Hannibal McArthur even proposed handing the island back to Brunei. In 1894, a submarine communications cable was built by the British to link the island's communications with North Borneo, Singapore and Hong Kong for the first time. By 30 October 1906, the British Government proposed to extend the boundaries of the Straits Settlements to include Labuan. The proposal took effect from 1 January 1907.

British conquest of Labuan

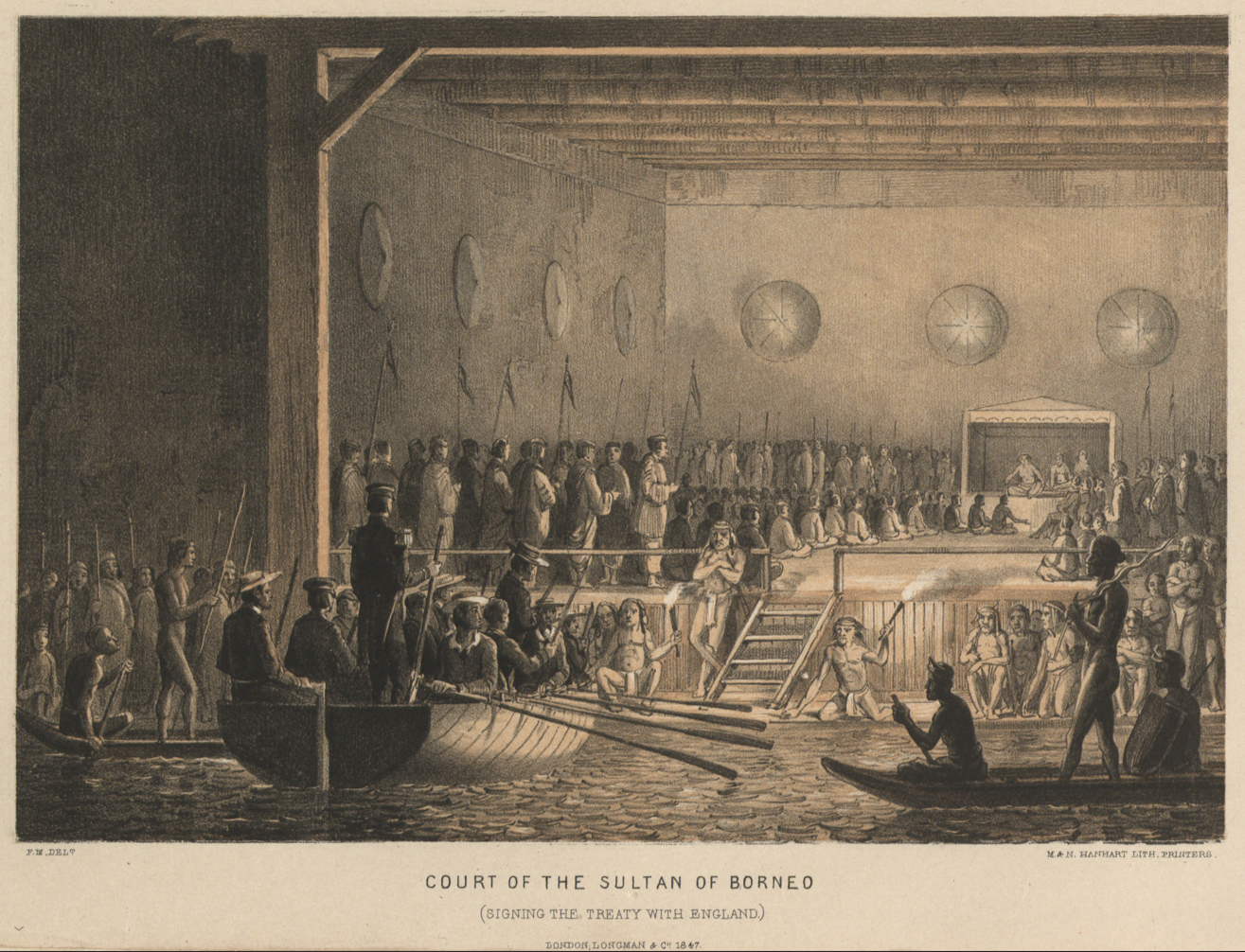
Anglo Bruneian Treaty 23 Oct 1844

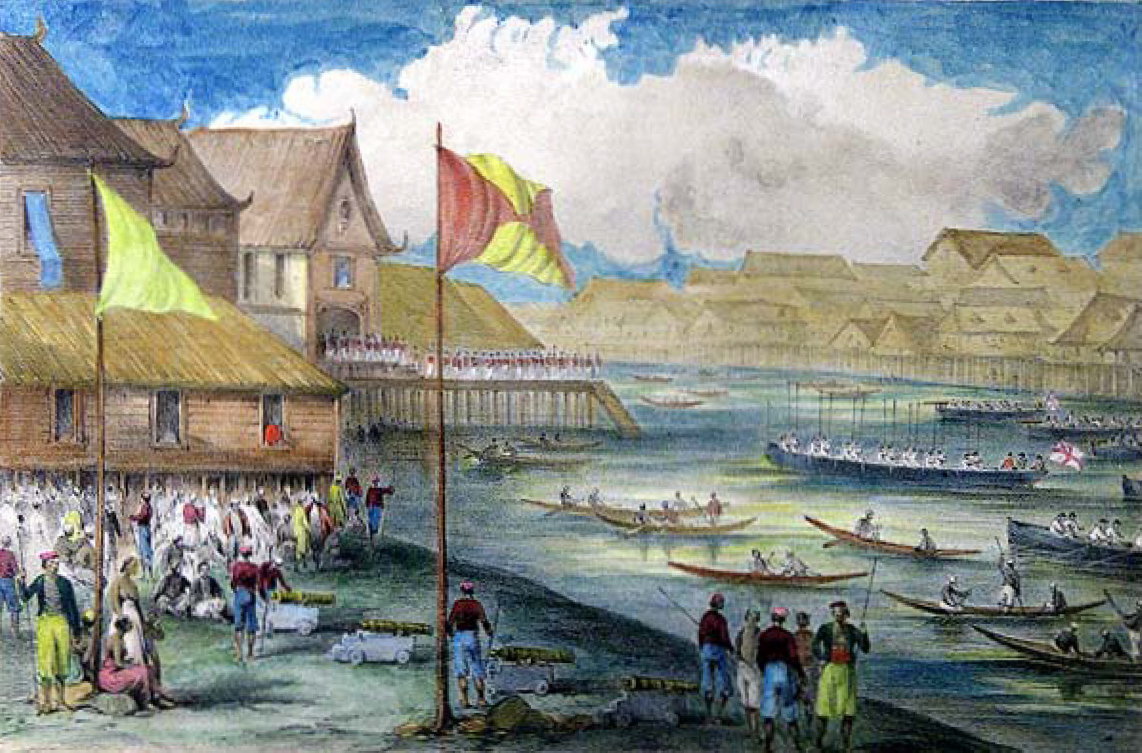
Marines stationed outside the Sultan's palace during the signing of the 1846 Treaty of Labuan

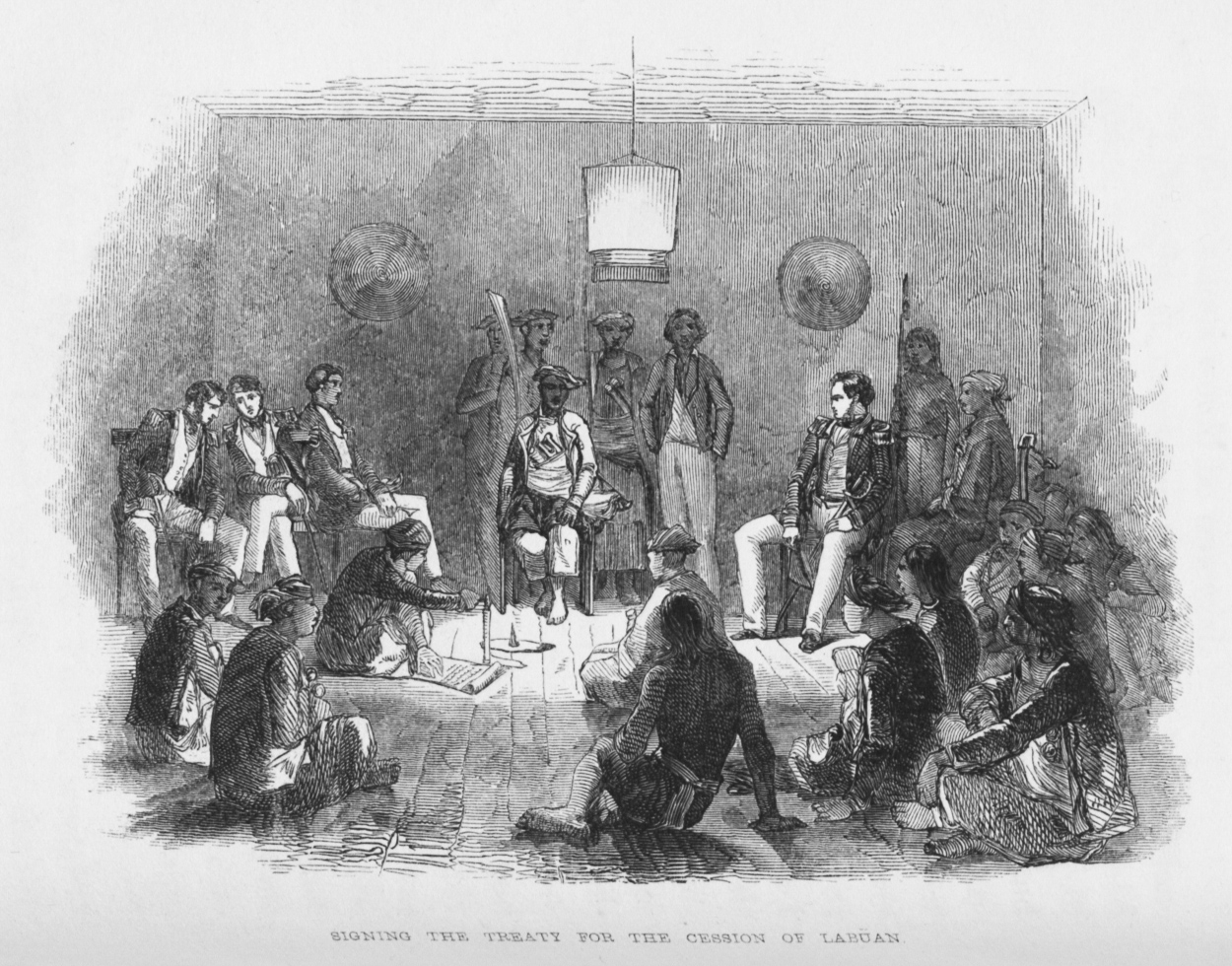
Signing of the Treaty of Labuan 18 Dec 1846

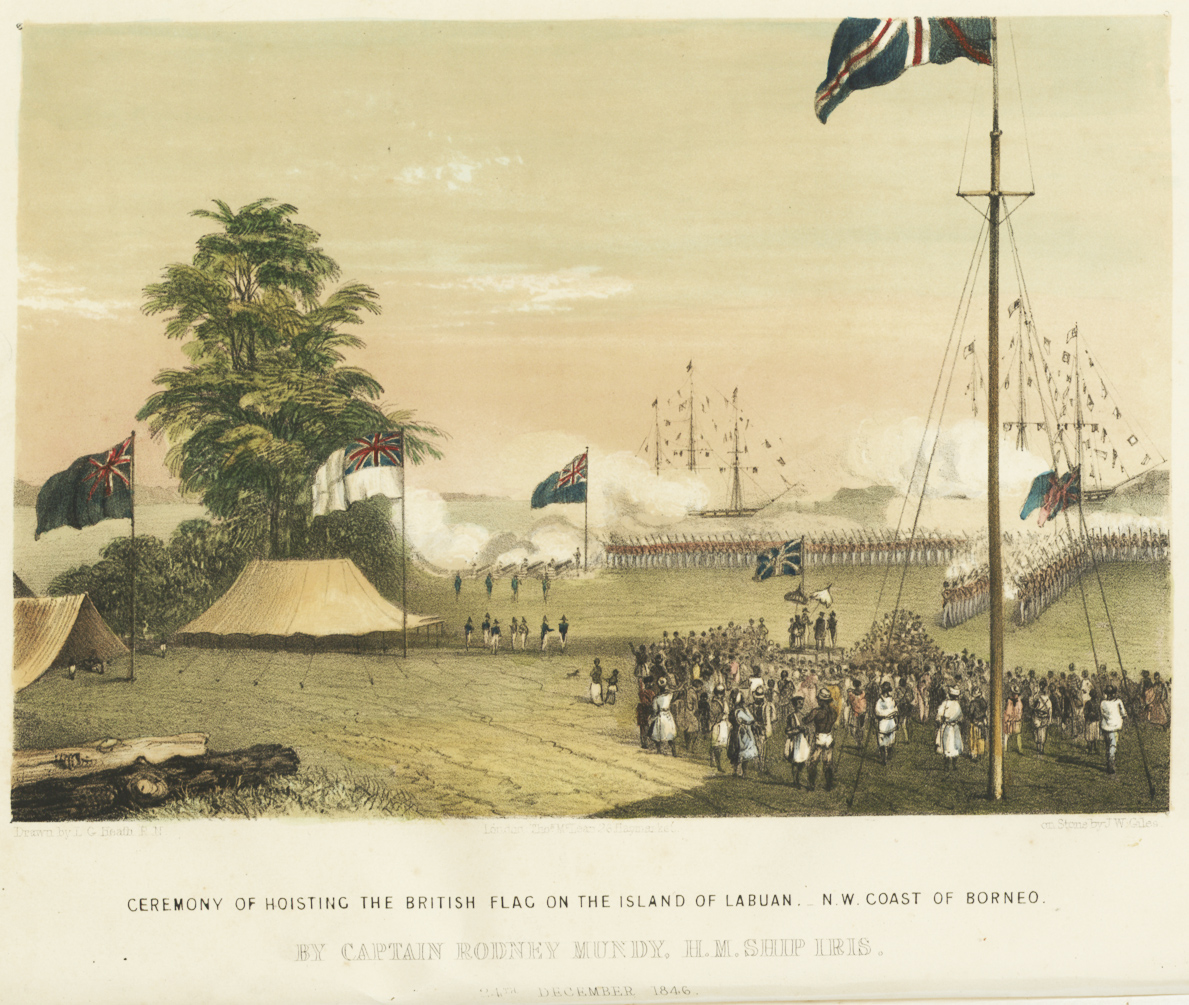
Flag raising Labuan 24 Dec 1846

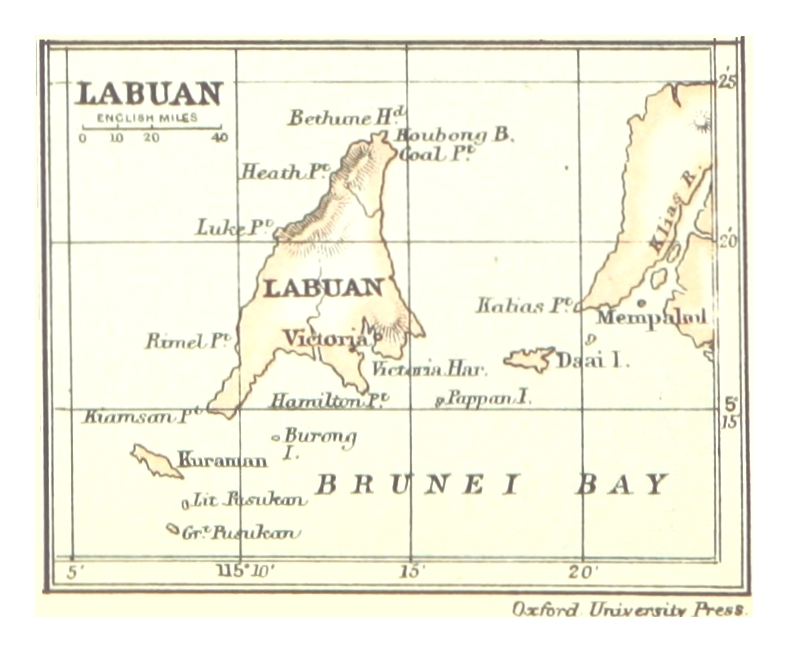
An 1888 British Map of Labuan

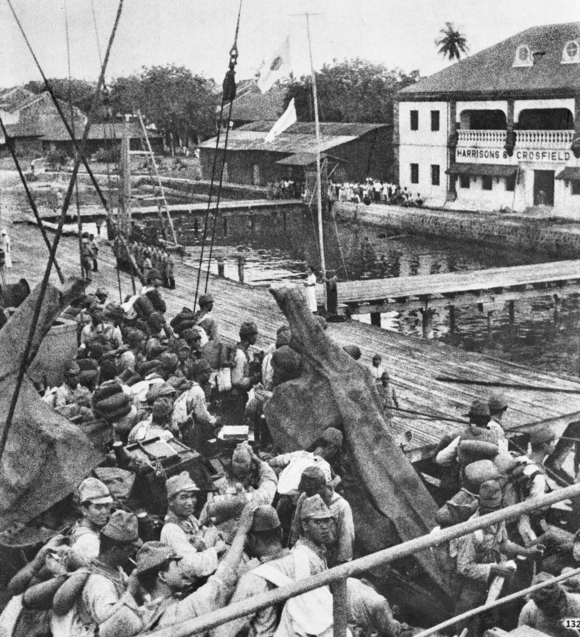
Japanese Navy anchoring at the coast of Labuan on 14 January 1942

In World War II, Labuan was occupied by Japan from 3 January 1942 until June 1945 and garrisoned by units of the Japanese 37th Army, which controlled Northern Borneo. The island served as the administrative centre for the Japanese forces. During the occupation, the Japanese Government changed the island name to Maida Island (前田島 [Maeda-shima]) on 9 December 1942 after Marquis Toshinari Maeda, as a remembrance to the first Japanese commander in northern Borneo. Maeda was killed in an air crash at Bintulu, Sarawak when en route to the island to open the airfield there. As the Allied counter-attack came closer, the Japanese also developed Labuan and Brunei Bay as a naval base.

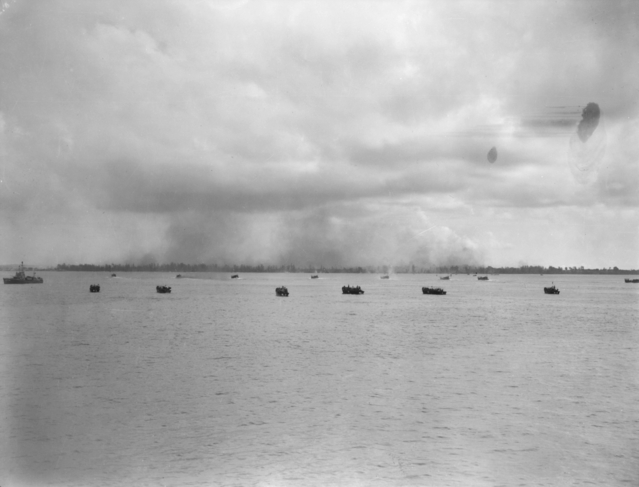
American support craft moving towards Victoria and Brown beach to assist the landing of the members of Australian 24th Infantry Brigade on the island during Operation Oboe Six

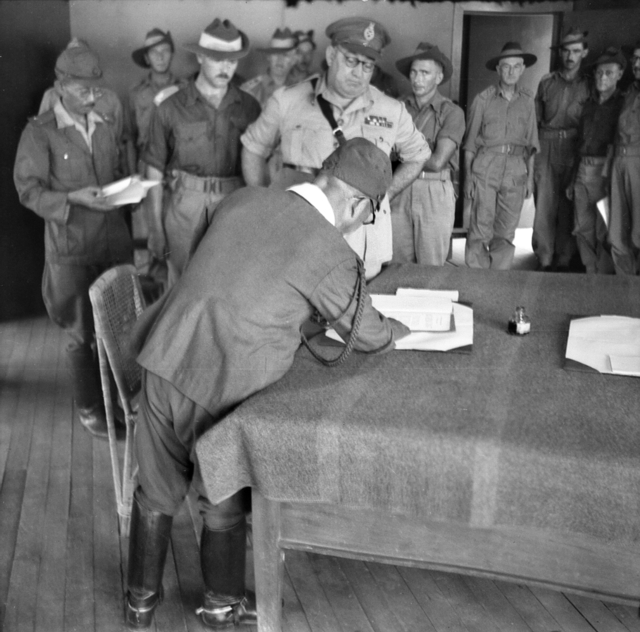
Japanese Commander in Borneo, Lieutenant General Masao Baba signing the surrender document dated 9 September 1945 on the Australian 9th Division headquarters in Labuan while being watched by the Australian Major General George Wootten

The liberation of Borneo by the Allied forces began on 10 June 1945 when the Australian Army under the command of Australian Major General George Wootten launched an attack under the codename of Operation Oboe Six. Labuan became the main objective for the Allied forces to repossess. Soon, the 9th Division of the Australian Army launched the attack with support from airstrikes and sea bombardments until the capture of the Labuan airstrip. Most of the Labuan island area including the main town of Victoria was under the control of Allied forces within four days of the landing on 10 June. On 9 September 1945, the Japanese Lieutenant General Masao Baba officially surrendered at a place now known as Surrender Point near the Layang-layang beach which he had been brought to the 9th Division headquarters on the island to sign the surrender document in front of the Australian 9th Division Army Commander George Wootten.

The name of Labuan was later restored by the British and the island was administered under the British Military Administration together with the rest of the Straits Settlements. Labuan then on 15 July 1946 joined the North Borneo Crown Colony, which in turn became the state of Sabah and Malaysia in 1963. In 1984, the Government of Sabah ceded Labuan to the federal government and later was admitted as a federal territory. This was done so that it could become an offshore financial centre. It was declared an international offshore financial centre and free trade zone in 1990.

== Geography ==
A map of Labuan island including its outlying islands

Labuan's area comprises the main island (Labuan Island – 91.64 square kilometres or 35.38 square miles) and six other smaller islands, Burung, Daat, Kuraman, Big Rusukan, Small Rusukan and Papan island with a total area of 91.64 square kilometres (35.38 square miles). The islands lie 8 kilometres (5.0 miles) off the coast of Borneo, adjacent to the Malaysian state of Sabah and to the north of Brunei Darussalam, on the northern edge of Brunei Bay facing the South China Sea. Labuan Island is mainly flat and undulating; its highest point is Bukit Kubong at 148 metres (486 feet) above sea level. Over 70% of the island is still covered with vegetation. The main town area of Victoria is located in a position facing Brunei Bay.

=== Islands ===
- Labuan Island
- Daat Island
- Papan Island
- Burung Island
- Kuraman Island
- Big Rusukan Island (Pulau Rusukan Besar)
- Small Rusukan Island (Pulau Rusukan Kecil)

=== Climate ===
Labuan has a tropical rainforest climate with no dry season, with February and March being drier. Over the course of a year, the temperature typically varies from 25 to 32 °C (77 to 90 °F) and is rarely below 24 °C (75 °F) or above 33 °C (91 °F). The warm season lasts from 1 April to 13 June with an average daily high temperature above 31 °C (88 °F). The hottest day of the year is 29 April, with an average high of 32 °C (90 °F) and low of 26 °C (79 °F). The cold season lasts from 7 January to 17 February with an average daily high temperature below 30 °C (86 °F). The coldest day of the year is 8 September, with an average low of 25 °C (77 °F) and high of 31 °C (88 °F). The weather station for Labuan is located at Labuan Airport.

Thunderstorms are the most severe precipitation observed in Labuan during 60% of those days with precipitation. They are most likely around October, when they occur very frequently. Meanwhile, the relative humidity for Labuan typically ranges from 63% (mildly humid) to 96% (very humid) over the course of the year, rarely dropping below 53% and reaching as high as 100% (extremely humid).

Climate data for Labuan (Labuan Airport) (1991–2020 normals, extremes 1930–present)
Month	Jan	Feb	Mar	Apr	May	Jun	Jul	Aug	Sep	Oct	Nov	Dec	Year
Record high °C (°F)	34.0 (93.2)	35.3 (95.5)	36.4 (97.5)	36.6 (97.9)	35.7 (96.3)	34.9 (94.8)	34.4 (93.9)	35.0 (95.0)	34.2 (93.6)	34.3 (93.7)	34.7 (94.5)	34.4 (93.9)	36.6 (97.9)
Mean daily maximum °C (°F)	30.4 (86.7)	30.6 (87.1)	31.6 (88.9)	32.1 (89.8)	32.1 (89.8)	31.7 (89.1)	31.5 (88.7)	31.6 (88.9)	31.4 (88.5)	31.0 (87.8)	31.1 (88.0)	30.8 (87.4)	31.3 (88.3)
Daily mean °C (°F)	27.3 (81.1)	27.2 (81.0)	27.7 (81.9)	28.3 (82.9)	28.4 (83.1)	28.1 (82.6)	27.9 (82.2)	28.0 (82.4)	27.8 (82.0)	27.5 (81.5)	27.6 (81.7)	27.5 (81.5)	27.8 (82.0)
Mean daily minimum °C (°F)	24.9 (76.8)	24.9 (76.8)	25.1 (77.2)	25.4 (77.7)	25.6 (78.1)	25.2 (77.4)	25.0 (77.0)	25.1 (77.2)	24.9 (76.8)	24.7 (76.5)	24.8 (76.6)	24.9 (76.8)	25 (77)
Record low °C (°F)	21.3 (70.3)	21.1 (70.0)	20.8 (69.4)	21.7 (71.1)	20.4 (68.7)	20.0 (68.0)	19.3 (66.7)	21.2 (70.2)	21.0 (69.8)	21.5 (70.7)	21.9 (71.4)	21.8 (71.2)	19.3 (66.7)
Average precipitation mm (inches)	222.8 (8.77)	105.2 (4.14)	124.4 (4.90)	216.5 (8.52)	267.0 (10.51)	312.1 (12.29)	299.3 (11.78)	311.1 (12.25)	332.9 (13.11)	427.5 (16.83)	364.8 (14.36)	336.4 (13.24)	3,320 (130.7)
Average precipitation days (≥ 1.0 mm)	11.0	7.1	9.0	12.4	14.4	14.5	14.0	13.3	15.4	18.4	17.4	15.3	162.2
Average relative humidity (%) (at 14:00)	73	74	71	70	71	69	69	70	70	72	73	73	71
Mean monthly sunshine hours	202.6	199.8	248.2	250.3	243.1	214.9	220.5	222.3	195.6	206.0	209.7	214.4	2,627.4
Source 1: World Meteorological Organization Deutscher Wetterdienst (humidity, 1939–1966)
Source 2: Meteo Climat (record highs and lows)

== Government ==
Labuan is one of the Malaysian federal government territories. The island is administered by the federal government through the Department of Federal Territories, a department under the Prime Minister's Department (Malaysia). Labuan Corporation is the municipal government for the island and is headed by a chairman who is responsible for the development and administration of the island. Labuan has one representative in each of the Lower and Upper Houses of Parliament. Typically, the current member of the parliament of Labuan will be appointed to become chairman of Labuan Corporation.

The island is represented in the lower house of parliament by MP Suhaili Abdul Rahman of PN (opposition) and in the upper house by Mohd Husni bin Mohamad Salleh. Below is the list of administrators of Labuan Corporation from 2001 to the current date:

Name	Term begins	Term ends
Othman Mohd Rijal	2001	2003
Suhaili Abdul Rahman	2003	2008
Ahmad Phesal Talib	2008	2011
Yussof Mahal	2011	2013
Rozman Haji Isli	2013	2018
Amir Hussein	2019	2021
Bashir Alias	2021	2023
Anifah Aman	2023	2025
Mohd Husni bin Mohamad Salleh	2025	Present

=== Administrative subdivision ===
The Federal Territory is administratively subdivided into the capital Bandar Victoria and 27 kampung (administrative villages), and which are ruled by appointed Ketua Kampung (headmen):

1. Bukit Kalam
2. Durian Tunjung
3. Tanjung Aru
4. Pohon Batu
5. Batu Arang
6. Patau-Patau 2
7. Belukut
8. Sungai Keling
9. Sungai Bedaun / Sungai Sembilang
10. Layang-Layangan
11. Sungai Labu
12. Pantai
13. Gersik / Saguking / Jawa / Parit
14. Sungai Buton
15. Kilan / Kilan Pulau Akar
16. Lajau
17. Rancha-Rancha
18. Nagalang / Kerupang
19. Bebuloh
20. Sungai Lada
21. Lubok Temiang
22. Sungai Bangat
23. Sungai Miri / Pagar
24. Patau-Patau 1
25. Batu Manikar
26. Bukit Kuda
27. Ganggarak / Merinding

=== Security ===
Security is the responsibility of the federal government, with naval patrol vessels, a garrison, and an air detachment based on the island. The vigilance of the local Coast Guard, Customs and Excise and Marine Police contribute to the maintenance of Labuan's reputation and status as an international offshore financial centre and free trade zone.

== Demographics ==
=== Population and religion ===
Historical population
Year	Pop.	±%
1991	54,241	—
2000	70,871	+30.7%
2010	83,920	+18.4%
2020	95,120	+13.3%

Religion in Labuan – 2020 Census
Religion	Percent
Islam	77.2%
Christianity	13.8%
Buddhism	8.1%
Hinduism	0.6%
Other religions	0.2%
No religion / Unknown	0.1%

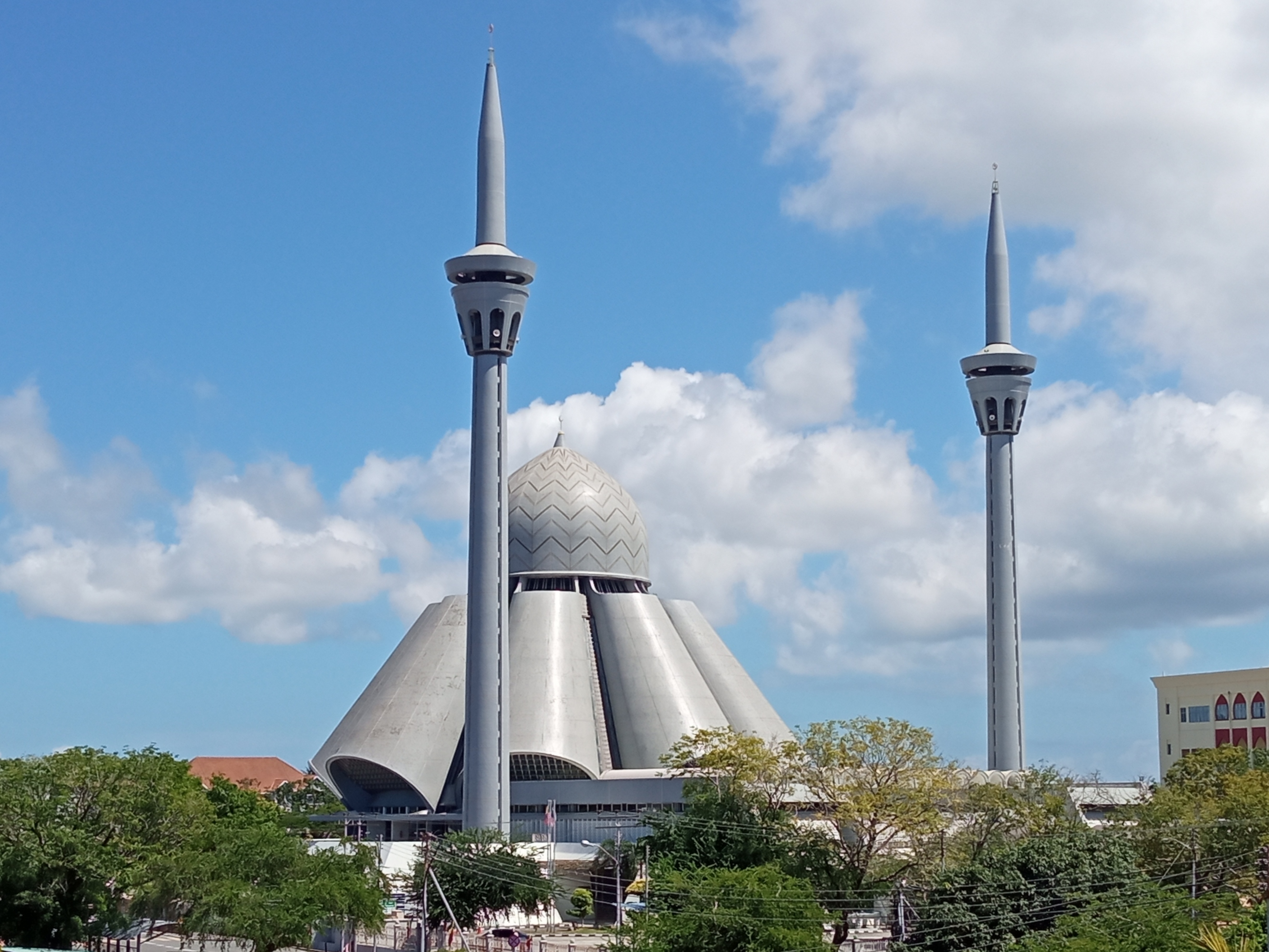
An-Nur State Mosque, 2021

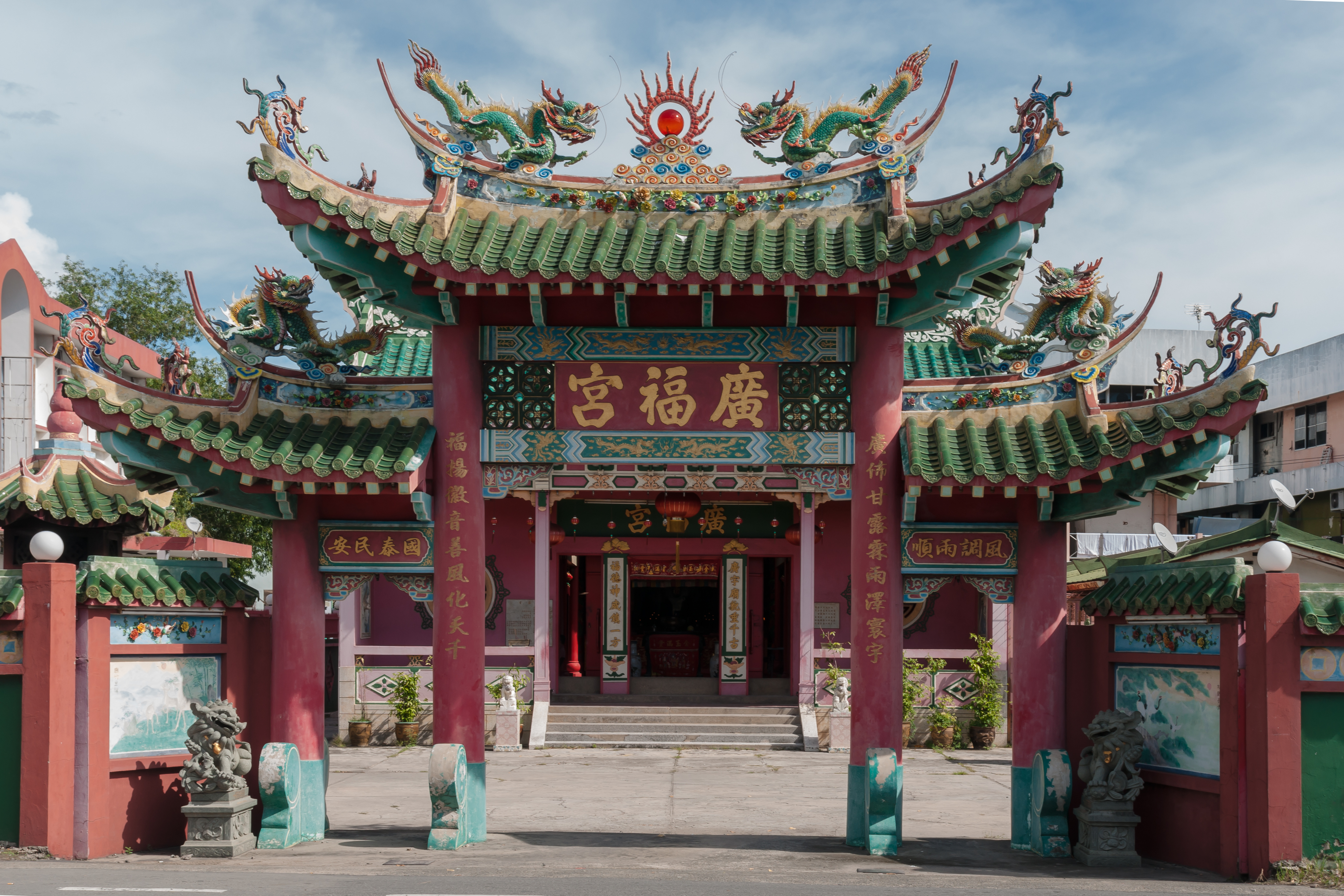
Kwang Fook Kong Temple

According to Malaysia's Department of Statistics, Labuan's population was 86,908 at the 2010 Census and 95,120 at the 2020 Census. The ethnic composition in 2020 in Labuan was: Kedayan and Bruneian Malay (34,068), Kadazan-Dusun including/excluding Rungus (9,408), Bajau (6,866), Murut (1265), Chinese (9,843), Indians (891), Lundayeh and other ethnic groups (21,947), and non-Malaysian citizens (10,832). The majority of Chinese people in Labuan are from the Hokkien dialect group (but has been since decreasing due to migration to the Peninsula as well as overseas); however, there are also many Hakkas, most of whom are migrants or descendants of migrants from mainland Sabah as well as local-born Hakkas, whom are settled for more than 2 to 3 generations in the island dating as long as the colonial period, in which they came as stopover migrants or traders before embarking to the mainland (even when it was still an only island offshore municipality within Sabah state jurisdiction from 1963 to 1984) as well as a negligible minority of Fuzhounese from neighbouring Sarawak, mostly working as government staff and those posted in the petroleum and gas offshore industries and to a lesser extent a large minority of Dayaks also from Sarawak who are resident here and their local-born descendants whom are mostly ethnically Iban with pockets of Bidayuh and Orang Ulu residents.

As of 2010 Census the population of Labuan is 76.0% Muslim, 12.4% Christian, 9.0% Buddhist, 0.4% Hindu, 2.1% follower of other religions, and 0.1% non-religious.

Labuan Ethnic Composition (2010)
Ethnic groups	Ethnics	Total
Bumiputera	Kadayan-Brunei	34,068
Bumiputera	Kadazan-Dusun (including/excluding Rungus)	9,408
Bumiputera	Bajau	6,866
Bumiputera	Murut	1,265
Bumiputera	Lun Bawang/Lundayeh and Other Bumiputeras (mostly Dayaks from Sarawak)	21,064
Non-Bumiputeras	Chinese	9,843
Non-Bumiputeras	Indian	891
Non-Bumiputeras	Others	883
Non-citizen		10,832
	Total	95,120

== Economy ==
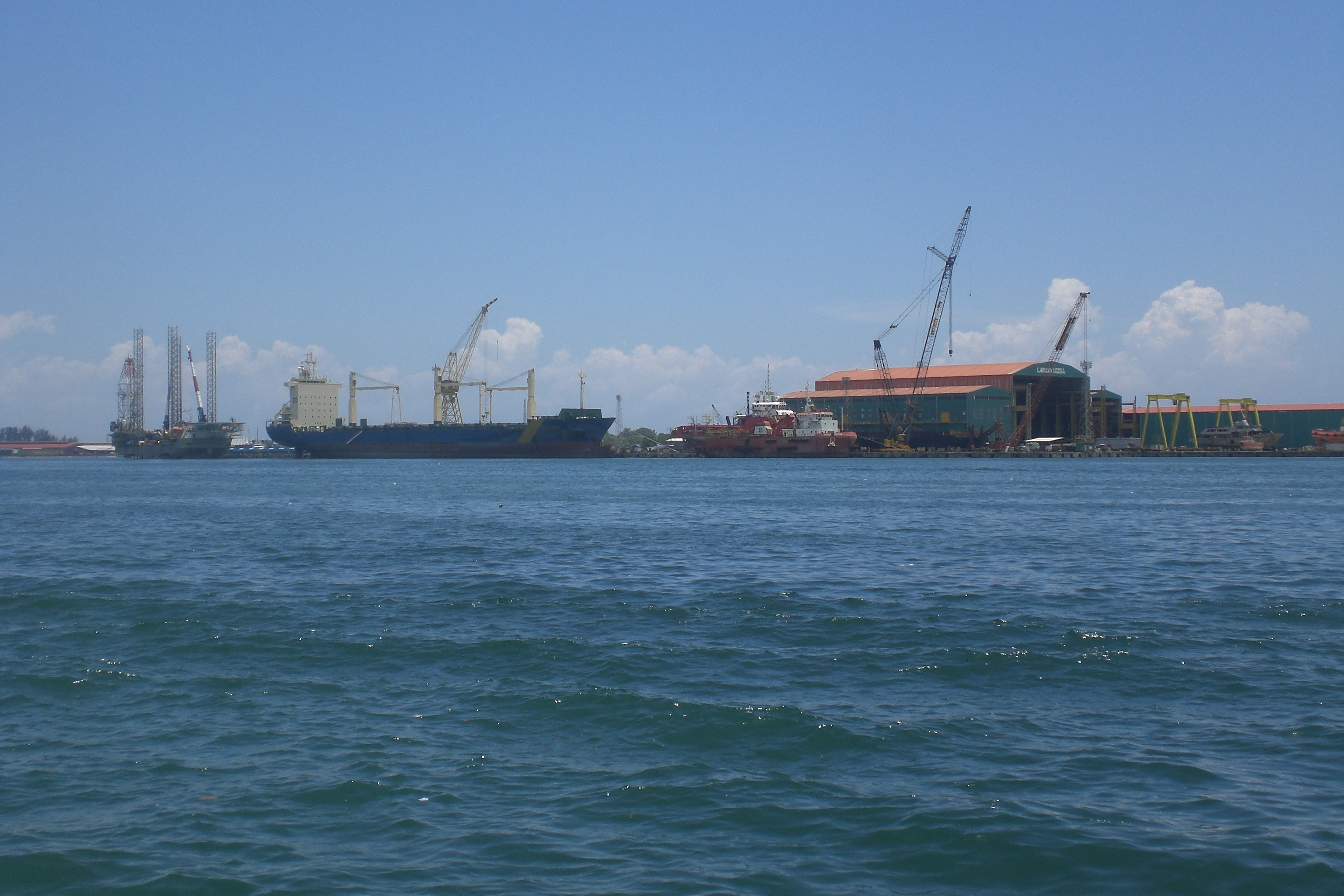
Labuan Port

The economy of Labuan thrives on its vast oil and gas resources and international investment and banking services. Labuan is very much an import-export oriented economy. Virtually all of its commodities including crude oil, methanol, HBI, gas, flour, animal feed, sea products, and ceramic tiles are exported either to Peninsular Malaysia or overseas. Raw materials, parts, and equipments for industrial uses well as consumer products are imported. In 2004, the total value of Labuan's external trade reached MYR11.8 billion from only MYR5.0 billion in 1995 for a net trade surplus of MYR5.1 billion. Among its major trade partners are India, Peninsular Malaysia, Sarawak, and South Korea. 65% of its exports are petroleum and gas-based products.

The Gross Domestic Product (GDP) of Labuan is estimated at MYR3.63 billion in 2012 with a growth rate of 5.8 per cent. Labuan GDP per capita in 2012 is MYR39,682. The total employment for Labuan is around 39,800 in 2012. The main economic sectors in Labuan is service and manufacturing which contributed 94.6 per cent to the island GDP. The service sector consisted mainly of Finance and Insurance and Real Estate and Business Services. Meanwhile, the manufacturing sector consists mainly of oil and gas industry and support.

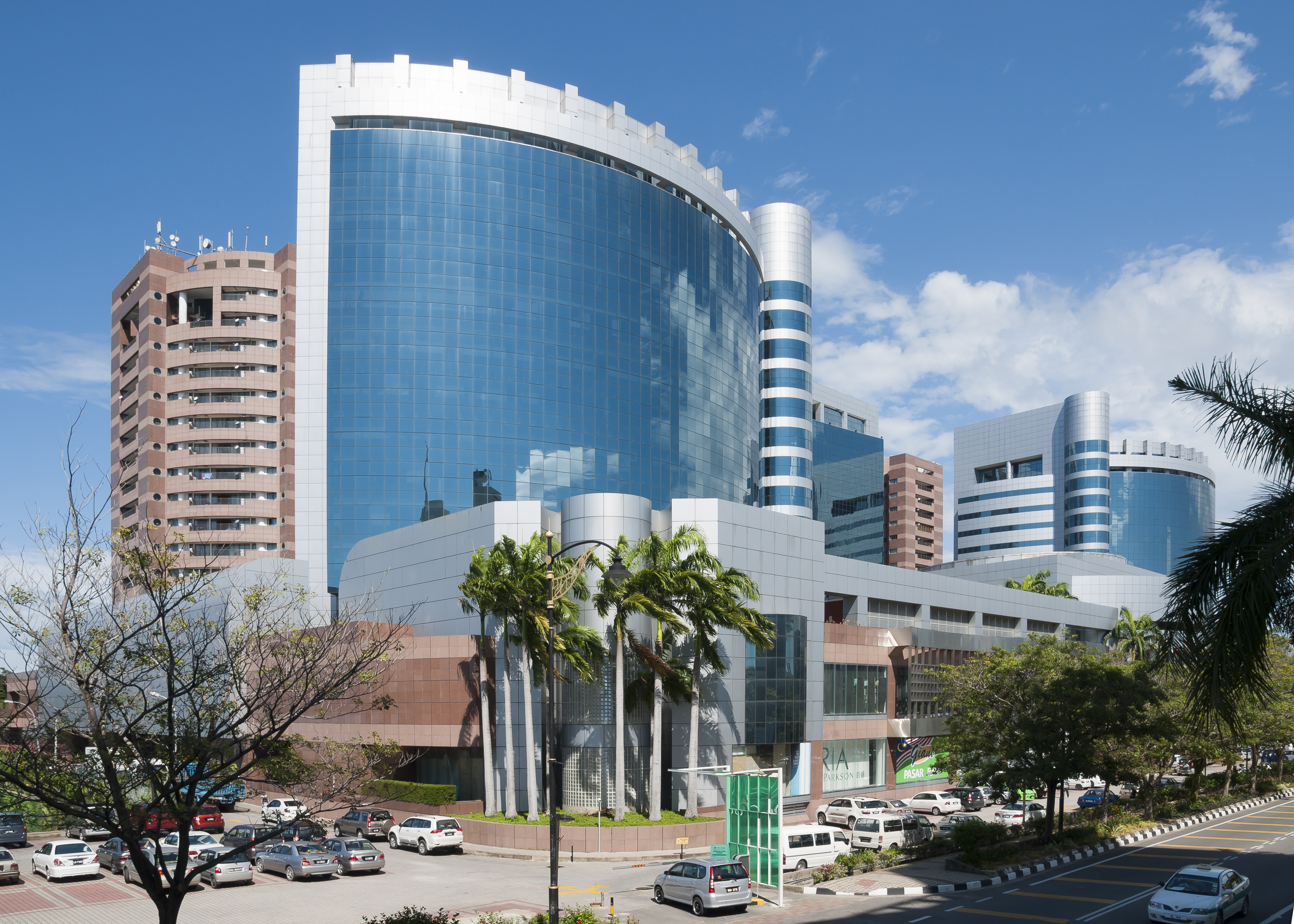
Labuan Financial Park complex, also known as Ujana Kewangan (UK) by many Labuanese.

The Labuan International Business and Financial Centre Labuan IBFC was created as Malaysia's only offshore financial hub in October 1990 and was operating under the name of Labuan International Offshore Financial Centre (IOFC). At the time it was established to strengthen the contribution of financial services to the Gross National Product (GNP) of Malaysia as well as to develop the island and its surrounding vicinity. The jurisdiction, supervised by the Labuan Offshore Financial Services Authority or LOFSA, offers benefits such as 3% tax on net audited results or a flat rate of Malaysian Ringgit (MYR) 20,000 to trading companies; low operational costs; liberal exchange controls; and a host of other advantages including readily available, experienced and professional service providers. In 2010 the notion "offshore" was excluded from all the statutes of Labuan due to world pressure on the tax havens and offshores.

Since its inception, the jurisdiction has expanded to become a base for more than 4,800 offshore companies and 68 licensed banks. The IBFC also has over 370 registered foundations, 100 partnerships, and over 63 licensed trusts. Labuan IBFC is embarking on an aggressive growth strategy to become the premier international business and financial centre in the Asia Pacific region.

Labuan's business focus is on five core areas: offshore holding companies, captive insurance, Shariah-compliant Islamic Finance structures, public and private funds, and wealth management. Labuan IBFC's position is further enhanced by the launch of the Malaysian International Islamic Finance Centre initiative in August 2006.

== Development ==
Unlike other federal territories, Labuan is underdeveloped. The island's urban landscape is characterised by a mix of older buildings and limited modern architectural advancements. Key infrastructure projects, such as road networks and public transportation systems, are less advanced nor extensive, resulting in significant traffic issues during peak hours, particularly in the early morning and evening commutes.

=== Labuan-Menumbok Bridge ===
One of the most anticipated infrastructure projects is the proposed bridge connecting Labuan to Menumbok in mainland Sabah. Like Penang Bridge. Labuan-Menumbok bridge aims to enhance connectivity and stimulate economic growth by providing a direct link between the island and the mainland. The project is expected to reduce travel time, improve the movement of goods and people, and boost tourism in the region, reflecting their commitment to regional development and integration.

The proposal was first introduced in the 1990s. However, it has faced numerous delays due to fact that the feasibility studies for the project were outdated and needed to be updated for the project to proceed smoothly.

== Transport ==
Labuan offers two primary modes of transportation for travel to and from the island.

=== Water ferry ===
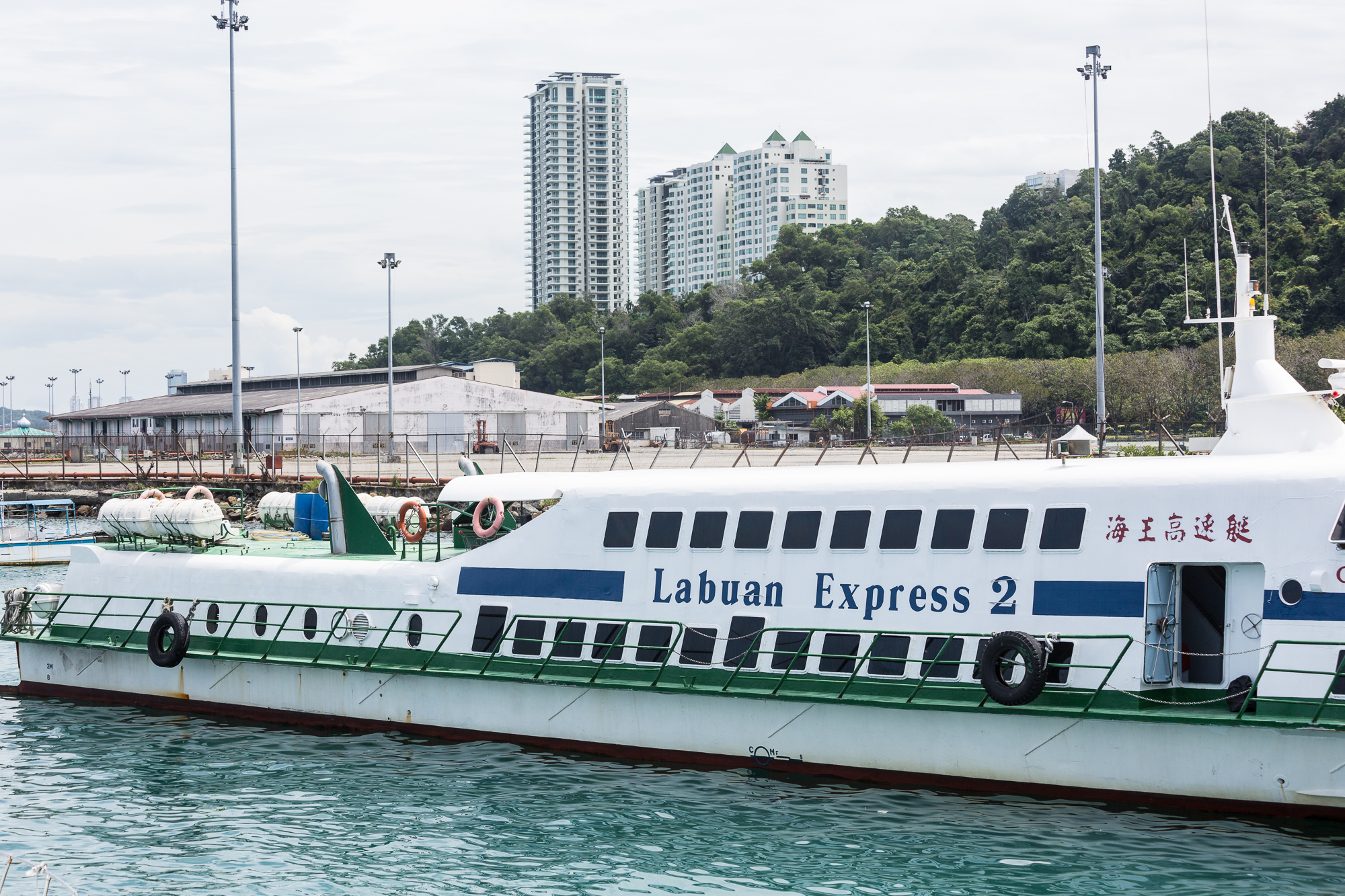
A ferry from Labuan in Kota Kinabalu, Sabah

One of the main routes is via water ferry services to Sabah and Sarawak. This ferry service is a vital link for passengers and vehicles, providing a convenient route across the island's strait.

In May 2024, Prime Minister Datuk Seri Anwar Ibrahim emphasised the need to update existing technical studies to reflect the current situation, such as upgrading works at the terminal, which cost RM22 million. The funding is intended to enhance the facilities, infrastructure, jetty, and ferry ramp at the terminal. The Prime Minister said the estimated one-hour embarkation time could be reduced by addressing delays caused by immigration checks. He emphasised that efficient services from local enforcement agencies were crucial in resolving congestion issues at the terminal, rather than relying solely on new infrastructure.

Ferry services between Kota Kinabalu, Sabah, and Labuan were suspended after the COVID-19 pandemic in Malaysia. Initially scheduled to resume on 15 December 2024 from Labuan to Jesselton Point, further delays occurred due to a lack of readiness as Jesselton Point. The ferry service eventually resumed on 28 May, although connecting to Kota Kinabalu Port instead of Jesselton Point.

Labuan is also connected to the Serasa Ferry Terminal in Brunei by a ferry service operating two to three times daily, facilitating international travel through the immigration facilities at the Labuan International Ferry Terminal. Ferry tickets from Labuan to Brunei can be purchased on the Labuanpay website, however the return journey must be purchased via Whatsapp or in-person at the ferry terminal from Bruneian ferry company Seri Mutiara Express.

=== Air travel ===
Labuan Airport facilitates air travel to the major destinations. The airport hosts several airlines:

- Malaysia Airlines: Provides regular flights to Kuala Lumpur, the capital city of Malaysia, offering connectivity to both domestic and international destinations.
- AirAsia: Another major airline operating from Labuan Airport, AirAsia also offers flights to Kuala Lumpur, catering to budget-conscious travellers.
- AirBorneo: Sarawak's flag carrier operates flights to Miri in Sarawak as well as Kota Kinabalu in the neighbouring state of Sabah, enhancing connectivity within East Malaysia.

These transportation options ensure that W.P. Labuan remains accessible and well-connected, supporting both the local population and visitors to the island.

== Places of interest ==
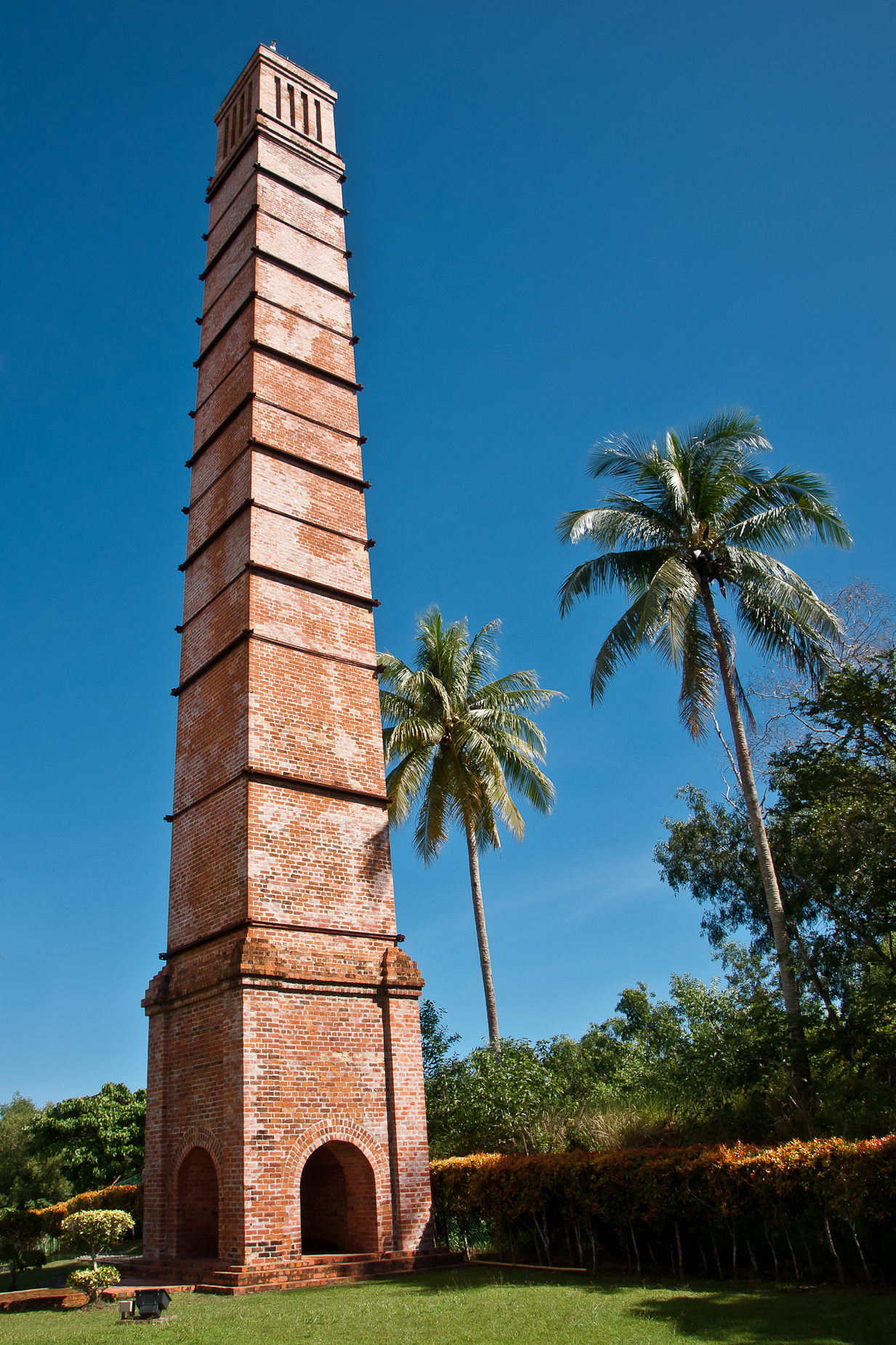
Chimney at the Colliery Fields

There are several attractions and places of interest in Labuan. The Labuan War Cemetery contains various war graves and memorials to the fallen of World War II. This includes British, Australian, Indian, Sarawakian, Bruneian, North Bornean, and Empire troops, with a total of 3,908 graves of fallen soldiers. A memorial service is held on Remembrance Day once every four years. The territory also has a memorial celebrating the surrender of the Japanese to the Australian Forces in 1945. Remnants of Labuan's history as a Royal Navy coaling station include the chimney, a well known local landmark. Labuan also contains a Labuan Maritime Museum.

Labuan is also the base for diving on four popular wreck dives: the Cement wreck, the American wreck (the first USS Salute), the Australian wreck and the Blue Water wreck.

Labuan has many schools. However, it has only one international school, Labuan International School. Other places of interest include the Labuan International Sea Sport Complex. Newly proposed is the Marina Centre and Labuan Square project which were completed in 2010.

Labuan's own institution of higher education is Universiti Malaysia Sabah Labuan International Campus, a branch of Universiti Malaysia Sabah in Sepanggar Bay, Kota Kinabalu. Labuan also has Kolej Matrikulasi Labuan, the only matriculation college in East Malaysia. All pre-university students from Sabah, Sarawak, and Labuan take their courses at this institution.

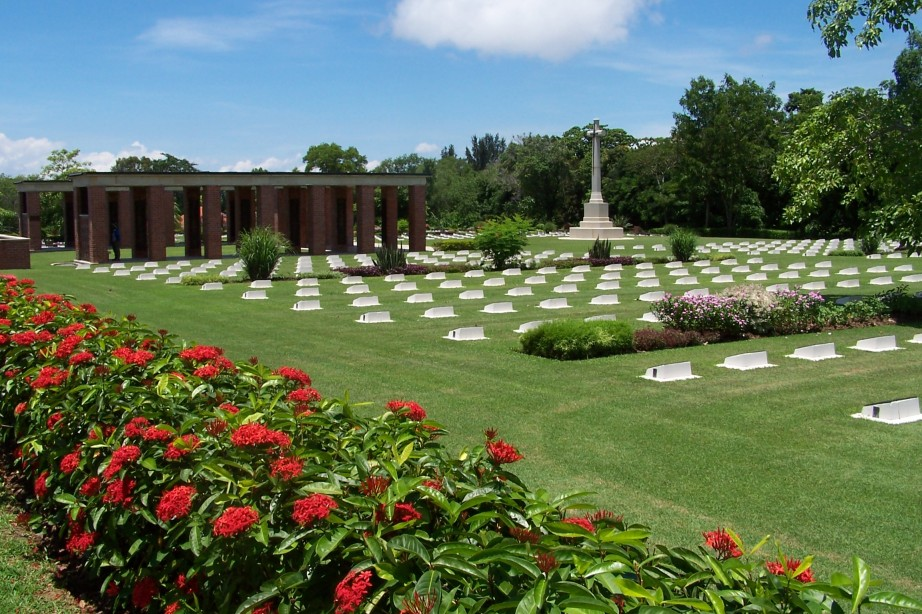
Labuan War Cemetery

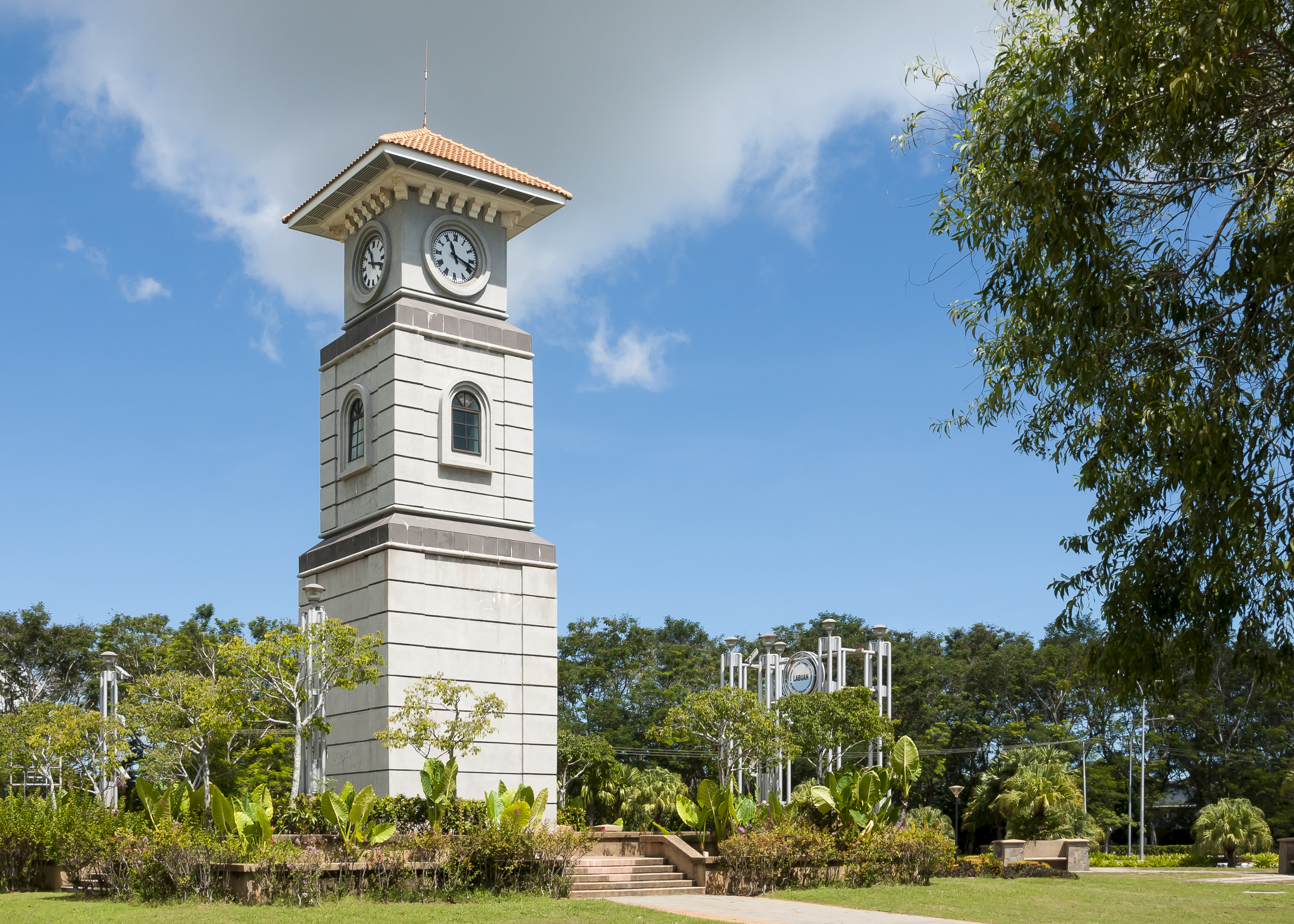
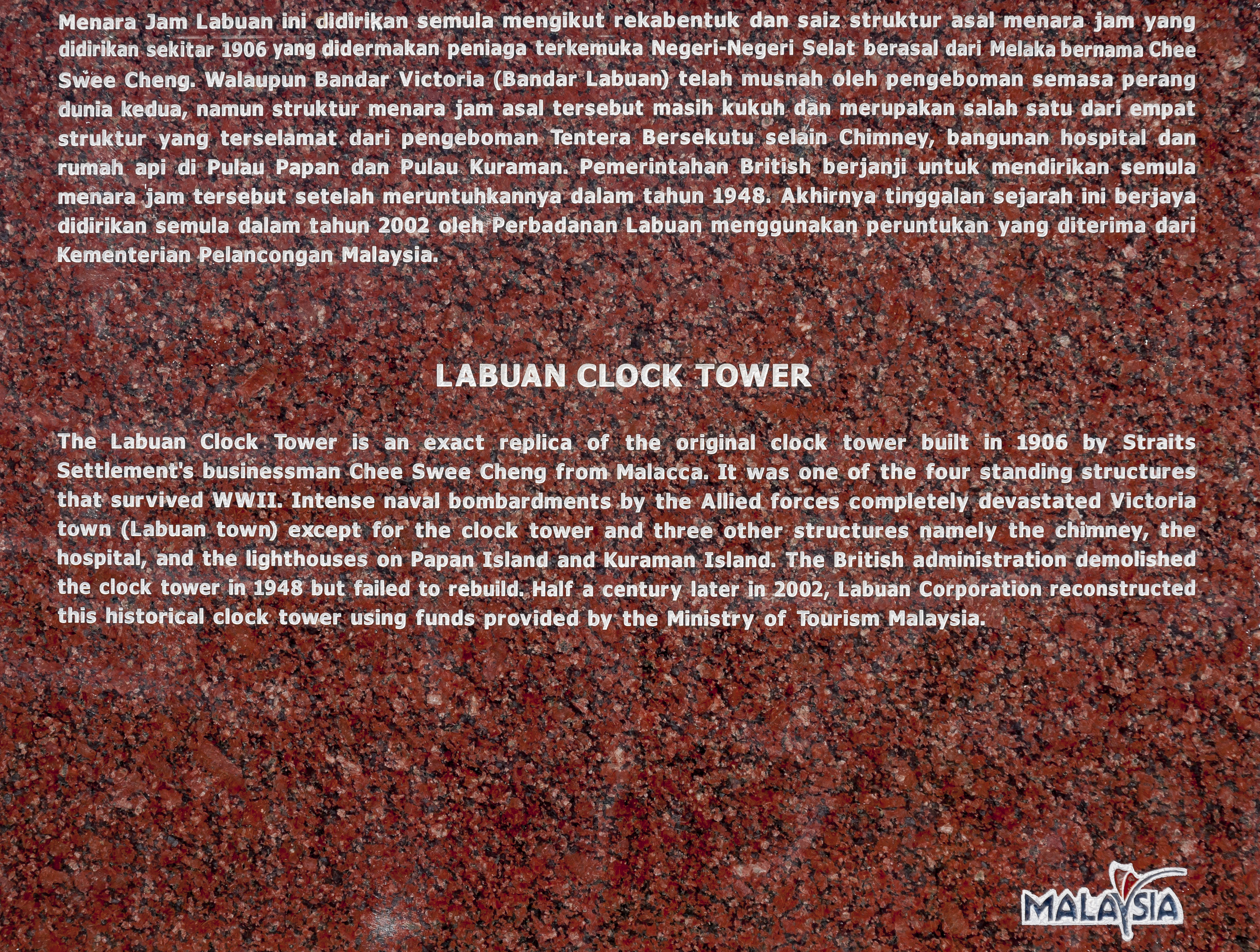
Replica Clock Tower of 1906 (Note: An inscription about the new clock tower.)

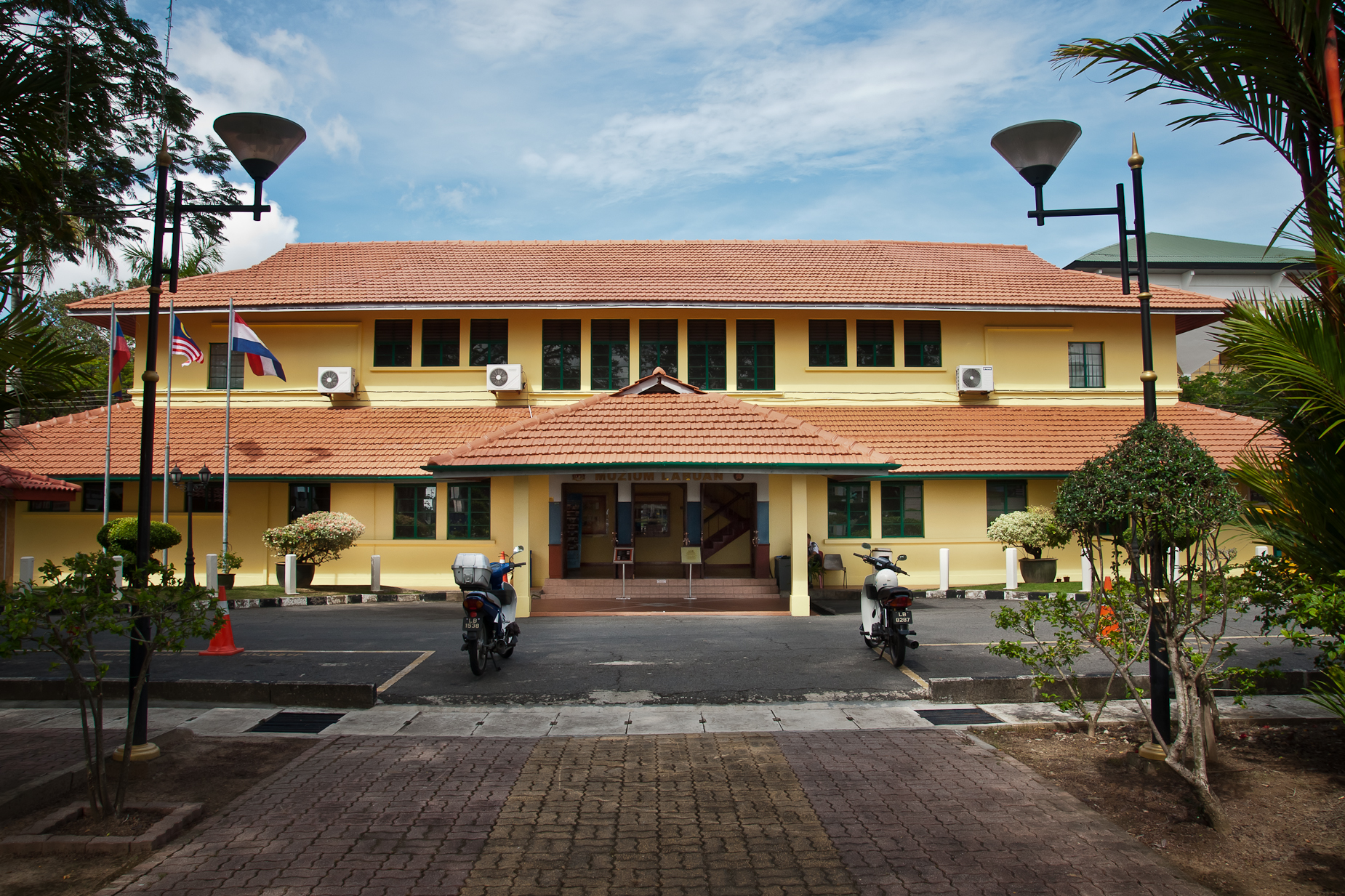
Labuan Museum

== Postage stamps and postal history ==
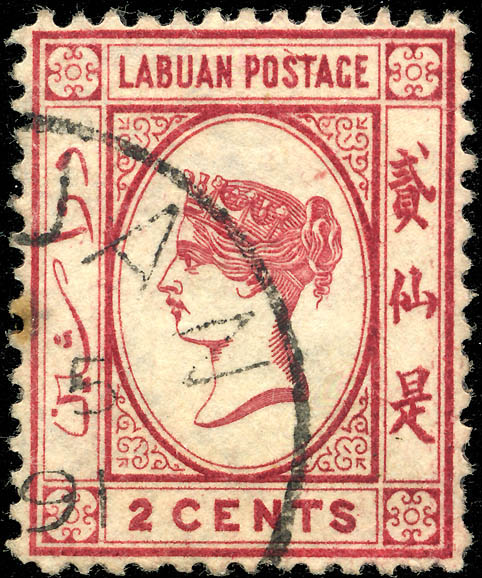
1885 2c stamp

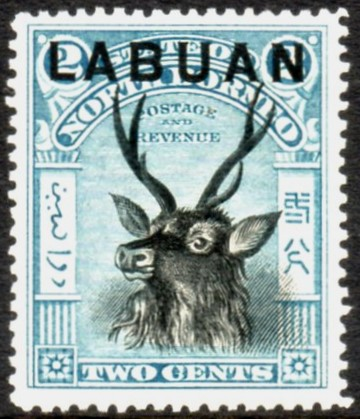
Stamp of North Borneo overprinted "Labuan", 1897

A post office was operating in Labuan by 1864, and used a circular date stamp as postmark. The postage stamps of India and Hong Kong were used on some mail, but they were probably carried there by individuals, instead of being on sale in Labuan. Mail was routed through Singapore. From 1867, Labuan officially used the postage stamps of the Straits Settlements but began issuing its own in May 1879.

Although initially the design for the first stamp issue was proposed to be depicting a clump of sago palms, for economic reasons, the queen heads design was finally adopted, having been used initially for postage stamps of Grenada. The first stamps of Labuan therefore depict the usual profile of Queen Victoria but are unusual for being inscribed in Malay-Arabic (Jawi) and Chinese scripts in addition to "LABUAN POSTAGE". Perennial shortages necessitated a variety of surcharges in between the several reprints and colour changes of the 1880s. The original stamps were engraved, but the last of the design, in April 1894, were done by lithography.

Beginning in May 1894, the stamps of North Borneo were overprinted "LABUAN". On 24 September 1896, the 50th anniversary of the cession was marked by overprinting "1846 / JUBILEE / 1896" on North Borneo stamps. Additional overprints appeared through the 1890s. In 1899 many types were surcharged with a value of 4 cents.

The last Labuan-only design came out in 1902, depicting a crown and inscribed "LABUAN COLONY". After incorporation into the Straits Settlements in 1906, Labuan ceased issuing its own stamps, although they remained valid for some time. Many of the remainder were cancelled-to-order for sale to collectors and are now worth only pennies; genuine franked/post used stamps are worth much more.

== Federal parliament seats ==
List of Labuan representatives in the Federal Parliament (Dewan Rakyat)

Parliament	Seat Name	Member of Parliament	Party
P166	Labuan	Suhaili Abdul Rahman	INDEPENDENT

== Notable residents ==
- Hassan Sani, Malaysian and former Sabah FA football player
- Hazwan Bakri, Malaysian and Kuching City football player
- Kelvin Teo, young entrepreneur and season 1 winner of reality show Love Me Do
- Karen Kong, Hong Kong-based Malaysian pop singer
- Suresh Singh, right-hand bowler who plays for the Malaysian cricket national team
- Yussof Mahal, politician from Barisan National party and former Member of Parliament for Labuan
