= Labuan International Business and Financial Centre =

Labuan International Business and Financial Centre (IBFC) is a special economic zone of the Malaysian government based on the island of Labuan off the Borneo coast. The zone was established in 1990 and has been marketed as having a unique position to tap investment opportunities in Asia and beyond.

The Labuan IBFC shares a common time zone with many large Asian cities and its location between China and India as well as its proximity to several other financial centres has been used to promote the Labuan IBFC as a convenient location for business dealings. Labuan has been designated as a financial centre and free trade zone by the Malaysian government.

== History ==
In January 2008, a rebranding and repositioning exercise of the IBFC to reflect the jurisdiction's burgeoning international status was followed by an aggressive marketing exercise. This included the setting up of Labuan IBFC Incorporated Sdn. Bhd. in May of the same year with a mandate by the Malaysian government to market and promote Labuan as the premier International Business and Financial Centre in Asia Pacific.
