= Labuan Matriculation College =

Pre-university college in East Malaysia

- Location: Labuan, Malaysia

Labuan Matriculation College (KML; Malay: Kolej Matrikulasi Labuan) is a pre-university college in Labuan, Malaysia. It is set up by the Malaysian Government to provide foundation courses for students entering the universities in Malaysia.

Labuan Matriculation College is one of the Centre of Excellence among matriculation colleges which Labuan Matriculation College is Centre of Excellence in Cultural

== Location ==
Located in Merinding, Labuan, this college is approximately 10 km away from Labuan Airport.

== Programmes Offered ==
The college offers two different matriculation programmes, namely, One Year Programme (PST, short for Program Satu Tahun in Malay) and Two Year Programme (PDT, short for Program Dua Tahun in Malay). For the One Year Programme, four courses are offered - 3 courses for Science and another for Accounting.

On the other hand, for the Two Year programme, three courses are offered: 3 courses for Science.

Three courses for Science offered are Module I, Module II and Module III. Module I contains Physics, Biology, Chemistry and Mathematics. Module II contains Physics, Computer Science, Chemistry and Mathematics while Module III contains Biology, Computer Science, Chemistry and Mathematics.

It prepares Malaysian SPM holders for entrance to the First Year bachelor's degree programme at local and overseas universities.

== Facilities ==
Facilities in Labuan Matriculation College include an air-conditioned library, three cafeterias, a student hall (Dewan Mutiara), six lecture halls, science labs, language labs, computer labs, sports facilities, student activity center, mosque and six blocks of hostels (Karisma, Madani and Luhur). There are also apartments for academic staff.

The college's academic center consists of two large lecture halls that can hold up to 300 students at one time. In addition, there are also four medium lecture halls, each with a capacity of 200.
