= Kampung Morten =

Village in Malacca City, Malacca, Malaysia

Coordinates: 2°12′12.2″N 102°15′03.7″E

- Kampung Morten
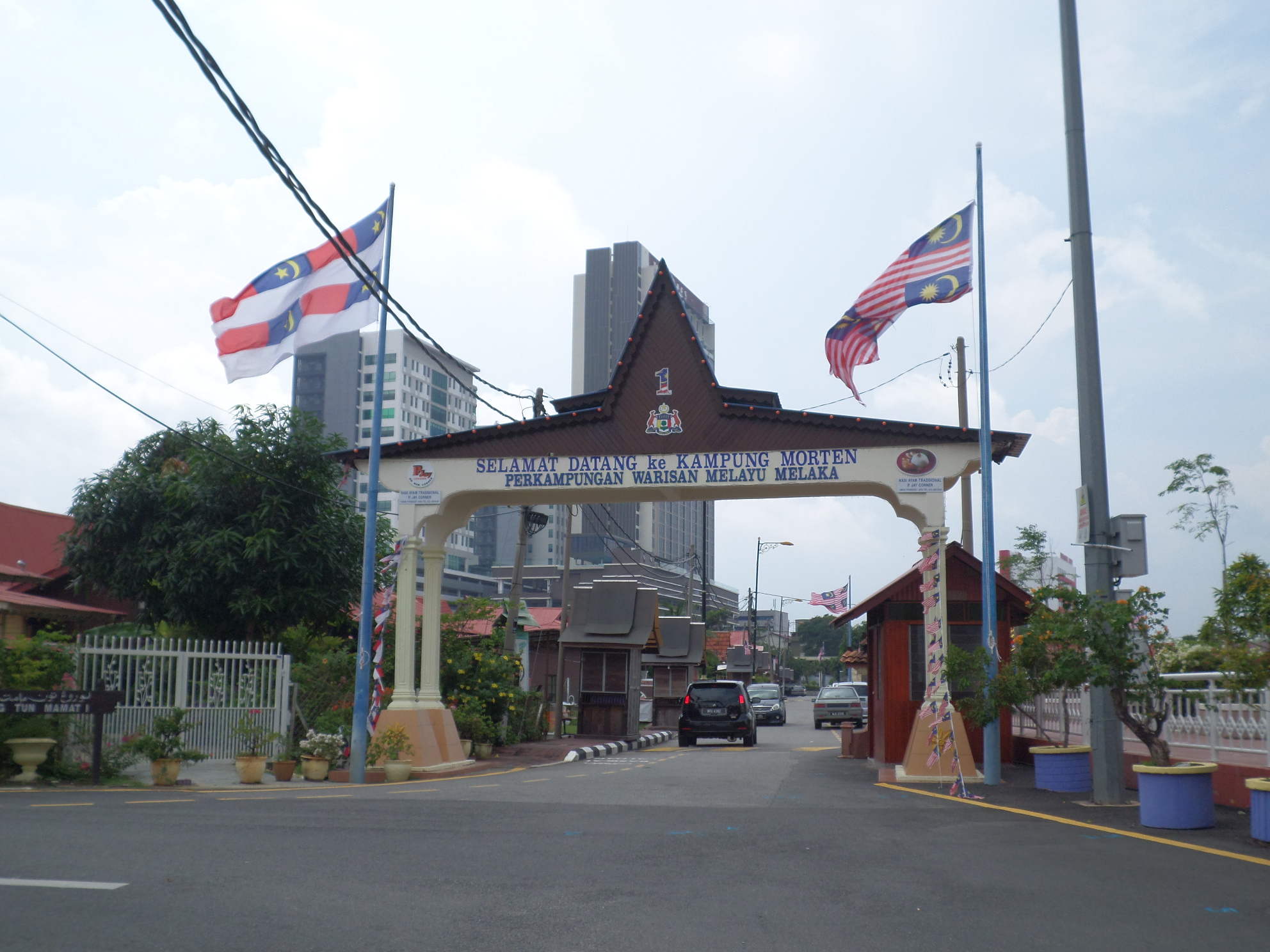

General information
- Type: Village
- Location: Malacca City, Malacca, Malaysia

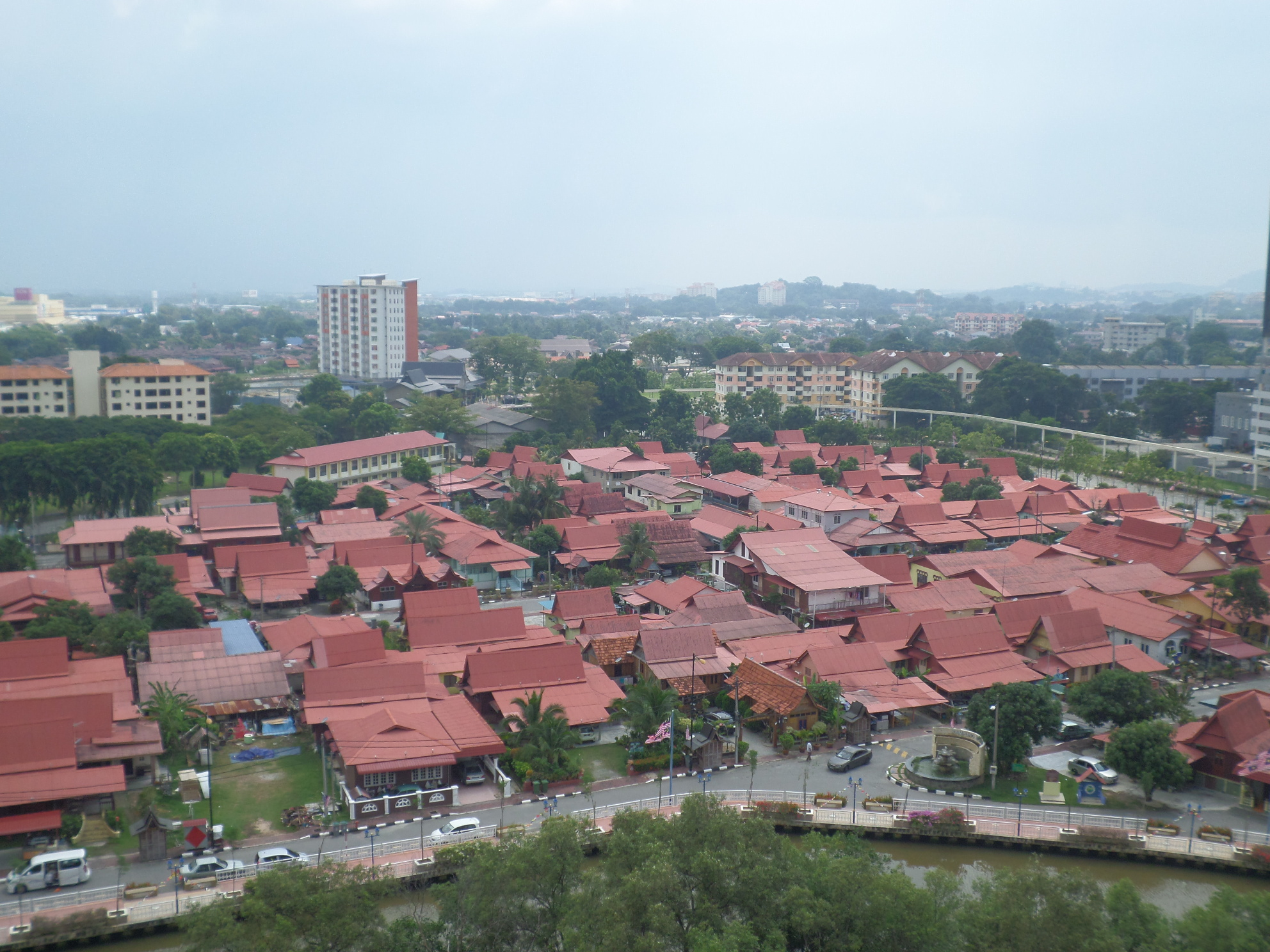
Kampung Morten's bird's-eye view.

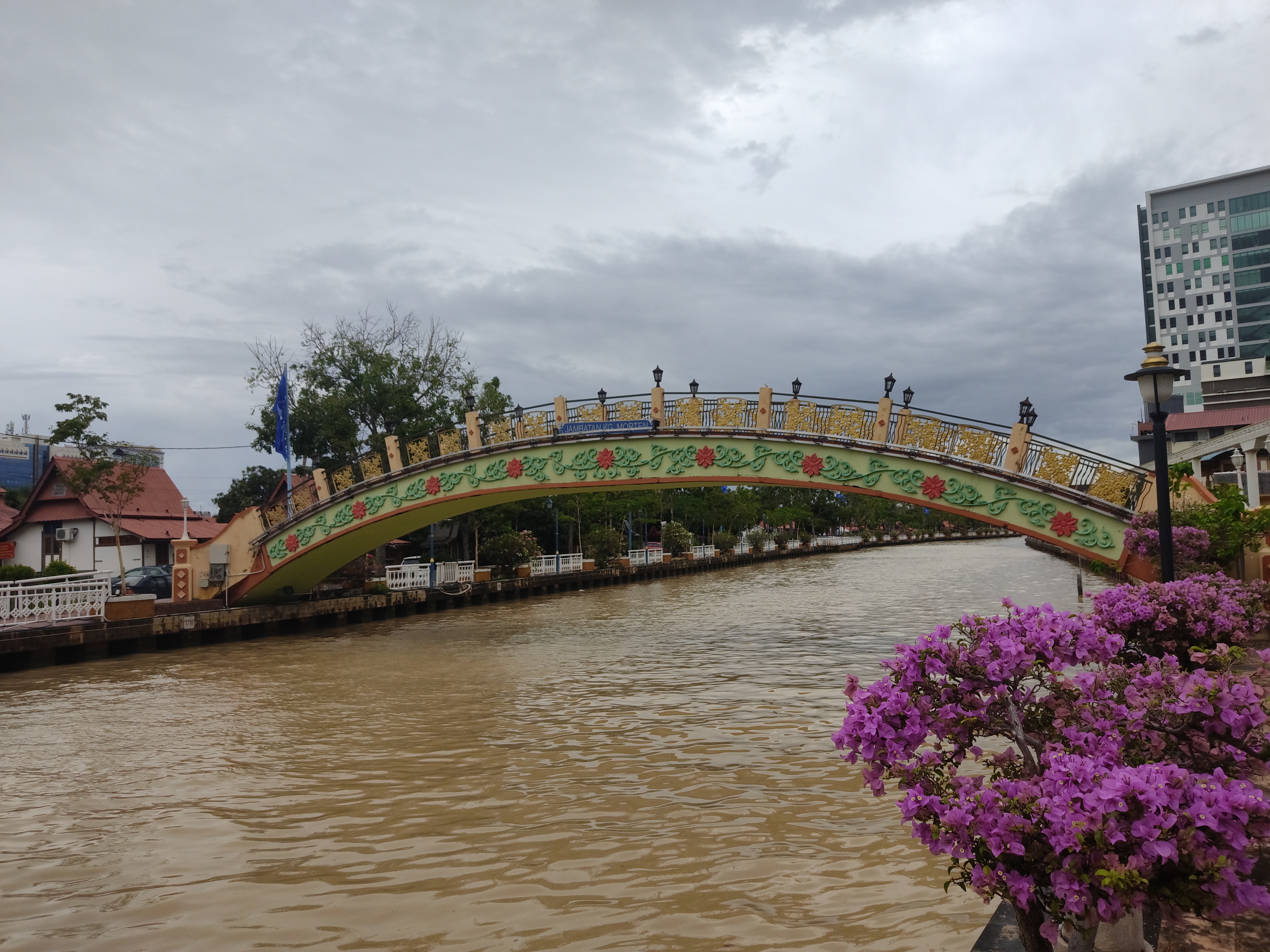
Kampung Morten bridge

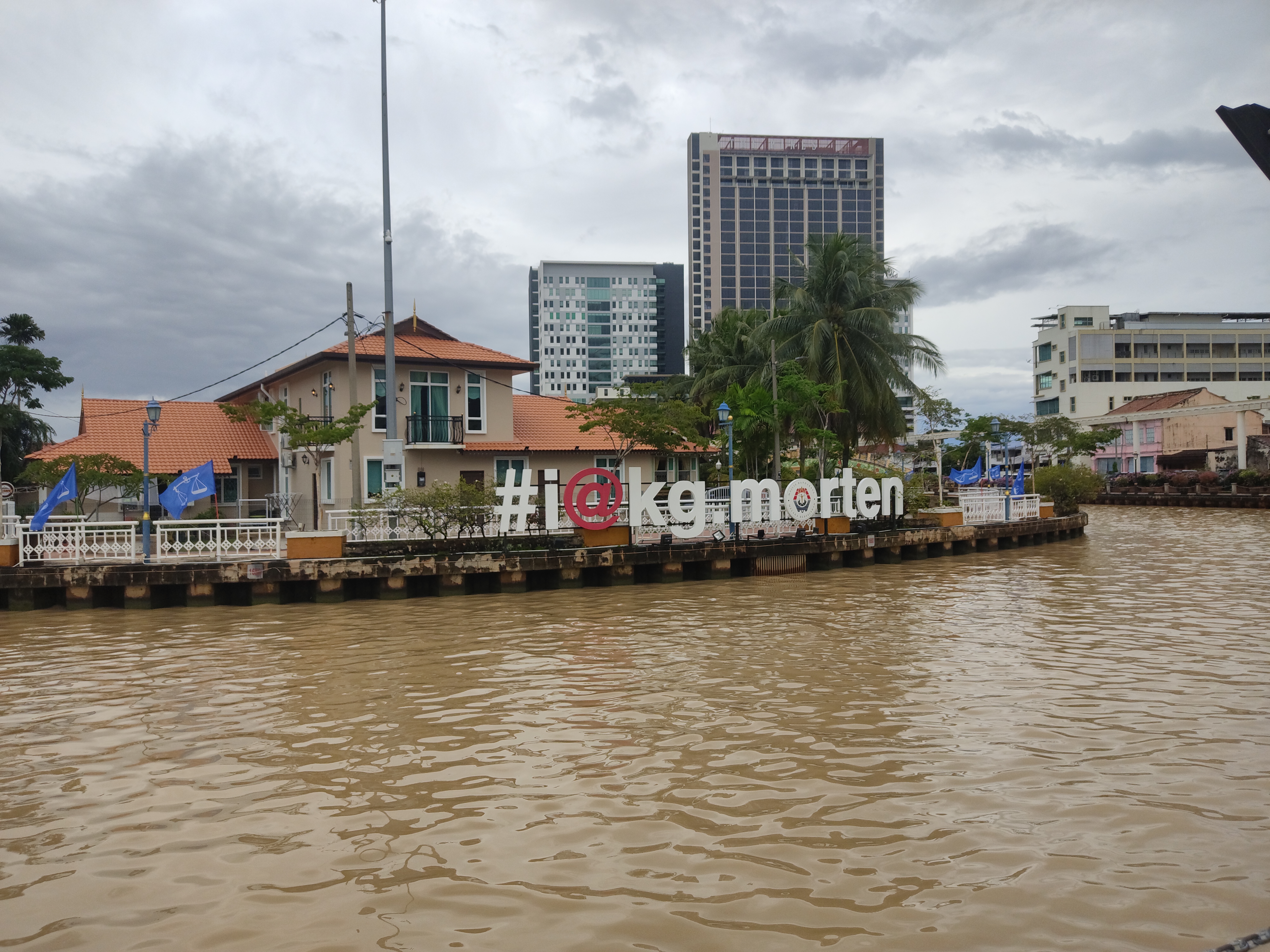
Kampung Morten along Malacca River.

Kampung Morten (lit. 'Morten Village') is a historically traditional Malay village in Malacca City Centre in the Malaysian state of Malacca. It is named after a British land revenue collector during the British Malaya, Frederick Joseph Morten. A quiet place during the 1960s and 1970s, this village was then evolved to become a tourist attraction when it was declared a heritage village under Malacca's Preservation and Conservation Enactment in 1989. Currently, it houses more than 100 traditional Malay houses.

== Tourist attractions ==
- Villa Sentosa, a Malay living-history museum depicting life in a wealthy early-20th-century home.

== History and development ==
Kampung Morten is a traditional Malay village situated along the Malacca River in the centre of Malacca City, Malaysia. The village developed during the British colonial period in the early 1920s and was named after Frederick Joseph Morten, a British land revenue official.

The village was planned with a perimeter access road running alongside the Malacca River. Its layout reflects the development of a traditional Malay residential settlement within an urban environment.

== Traditional Malay architecture ==
Kampung Morten is known for its traditional Malay houses, which form an important part of Melaka's architectural heritage. Traditional houses in the area commonly feature hardwood timber construction, decorative wood carvings and distinctive staircases decorated with glazed ceramic tiles influenced by Chinese design.

The village's traditional residential character has been examined in academic studies concerning heritage conservation and the effects of urban development.

== Villa Sentosa ==
Villa Sentosa, also known as the Malay Living Museum, is a traditional Malay heritage house in Kampung Morten. The house was established by Haji Hashim bin Dato' Demang Haji Abdul Ghani, an early figure associated with the village. It has been preserved as a privately maintained museum containing family possessions and historical household objects.

Villa Sentosa contains collections of traditional Malay clothing, musical instruments and antique furniture. The house provides an example of traditional Malay domestic architecture and family heritage in Melaka.

The house celebrated its centenary on 13 April 2024. During the commemoration, the Melaka state government announced a one-off allocation of RM100,000 for its restoration and preservation. The funding was intended to support maintenance of the historic structure and the conservation of its heritage features.

== Heritage conservation ==
The preservation of Kampung Morten has been the subject of academic research examining the relationship between urban development, tourism and traditional Malay residential heritage.

A 2015 study of residents' conservation preferences found that 83% of respondents valued traditional houses as heritage, while 62% expressed concern that excessive development could diminish the aesthetic character of the village.

A further study published in 2020 examined residents' perceptions of heritage conservation incentives and identified tensions between conservation programmes, local community needs and urban development.

== See also ==
- List of tourist attractions in Malacca
