= Malacca UMNO Museum =

Museum in Malacca City, Malacca, Malaysia

- Muzium UMNO Melaka
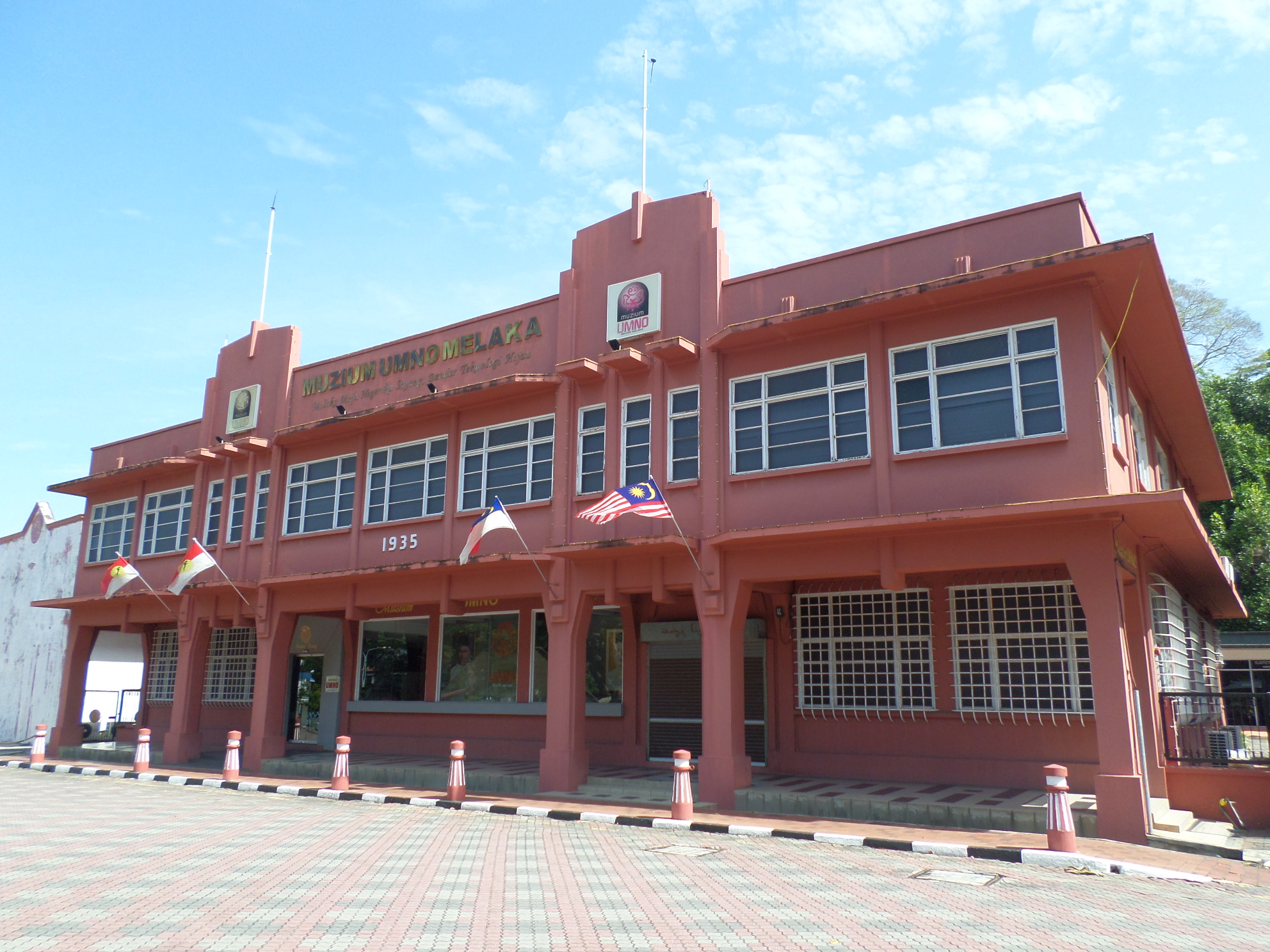
- Location: Malacca City, Malacca, Malaysia
- Coordinates: 2°11′31.0″N 102°14′56.1″E
- Type: museum
- Owner: United Malays National Organisation (UMNO)

Malacca UMNO Museum (Malay: Muzium UMNO Melaka) also known as Melaka UMNO Museum (Note: The state UMNO Branch uses the Malay language spelling of the state's name, as opposed to the more traditional English language spelling of its name, "Malacca".) or more commonly UMNO Museum is a museum which exhibits historical matters about the founding, struggle and development of the oldest party in Malaysia – United Malays National Organisation (UMNO) in Malacca City, Malacca. It opens every day from 9.00 a.m. to 5.30 p.m., except Friday in which it closes from 12.45 p.m. until 2.45 p.m.

== See also ==
- List of museums in Malaysia
- List of tourist attractions in Malacca
