= Sungai Udang Recreational Forest =

Forest in Melaka Tengah, Malacca, Malaysia

Sungai Udang Recreational Forest Malay: Hutan Rekreasi Sungai Udang
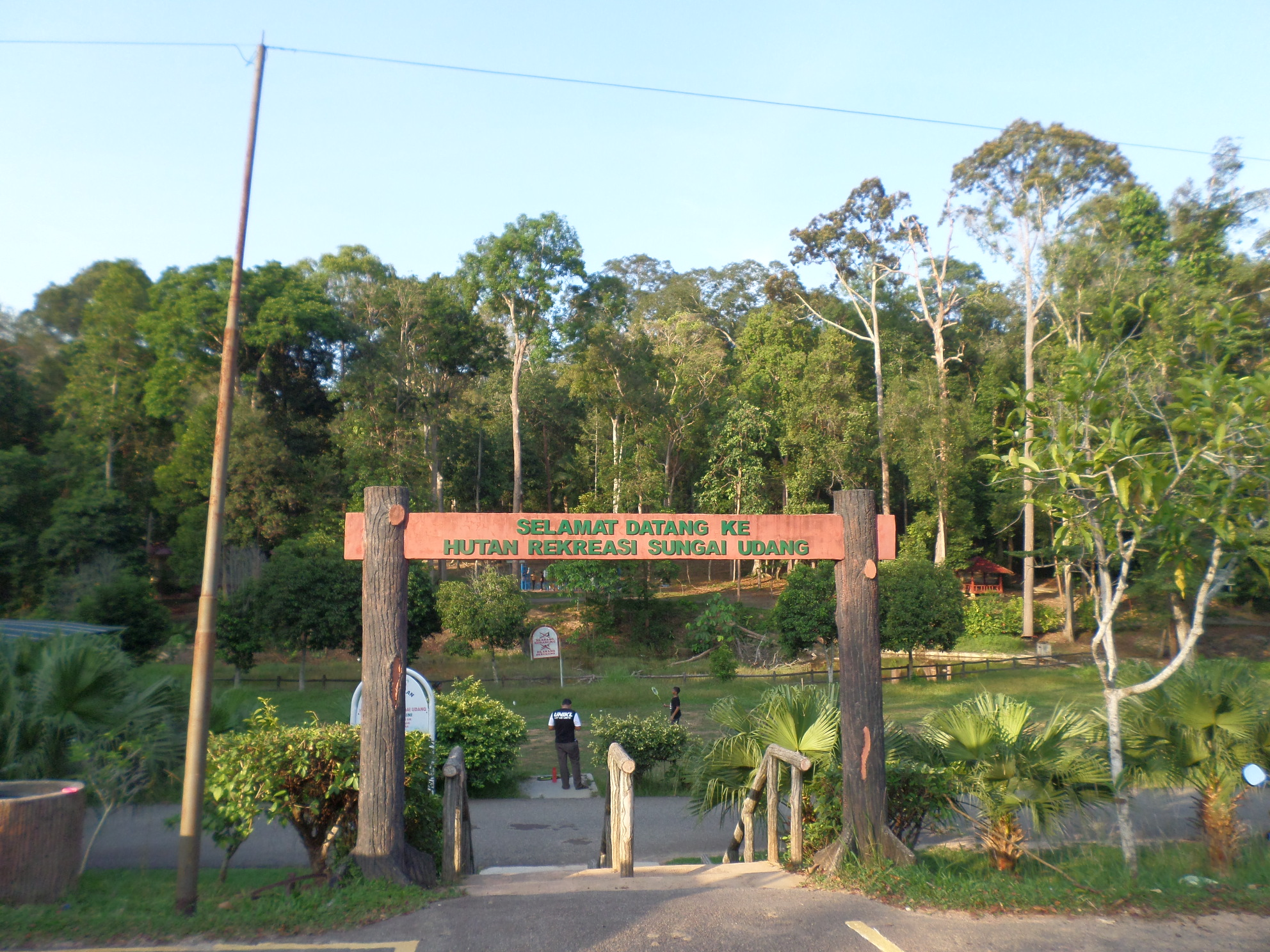

- Location within Malacca
- Interactive map of Sungai Udang Recreational Forest

Geography
- Location: Sungai Udang, Malacca, Malaysia
- Coordinates: 2°18′02.9″N 102°07′53.6″E
- Area: 55 ha (140 acres)

Administration
- Established: 1987
- Authority: Malacca State Forestry Department

Sungai Udang Recreational Forest (Malay: Hutan Rekreasi Sungai Udang) is a lowland dipterocarp forest in Sungai Udang, Malacca, Malaysia under the management of the State Forestry Department. It was declared a reserved area in 1987 with an area of 55 hectares.

== See also ==
- Geography of Malaysia
- List of tourist attractions in Malacca
