= St. John's Fort =

Fort in Melaka City, Melaka, Malaysia

- Kubu St. John
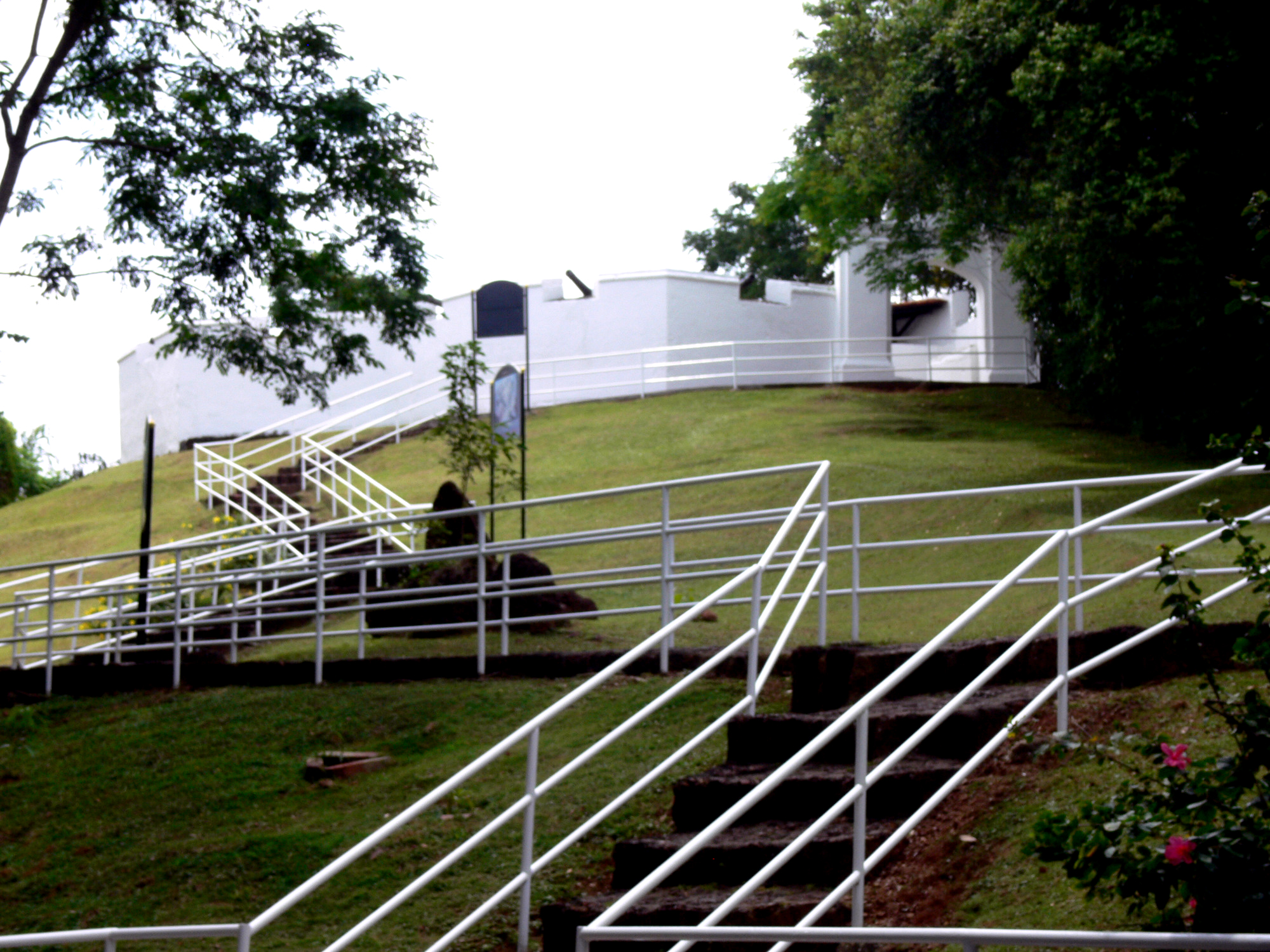
- Interactive map of the St. John's Fort area

General information
- Type: fort
- Location: Melaka City, Melaka, Malaysia
- Coordinates: 2°11′21.6″N 102°15′52.6″E

The St. John's Fort (Malay: Kubu St. John) is a historical fort in Melaka City, Melaka, Malaysia.

== History ==
The fort was reconstructed from existing Portuguese fortifications during the Dutch period in the 18th century to guard against landward attacks. It was once a private Portuguese chapel dedicated to St. John the Baptist.

== Architecture ==
The fort is located at the top of St. John's Hill. It was built from Laterite stone and bricks. The fort had only one entrance and its outer walls range between 3–4 meters high.

== Exhibitions ==
The fort has canons that are facing inland because the Dutch feared inland threats from Acehnese and Bugis invaders more than maritime invasions.

== See also ==
- List of tourist attractions in Malacca
