= Demang Abdul Ghani Gallery =

Gallery in Jasin, Melaka, Malaysia

- Rumah Penghulu Abdul Ghani
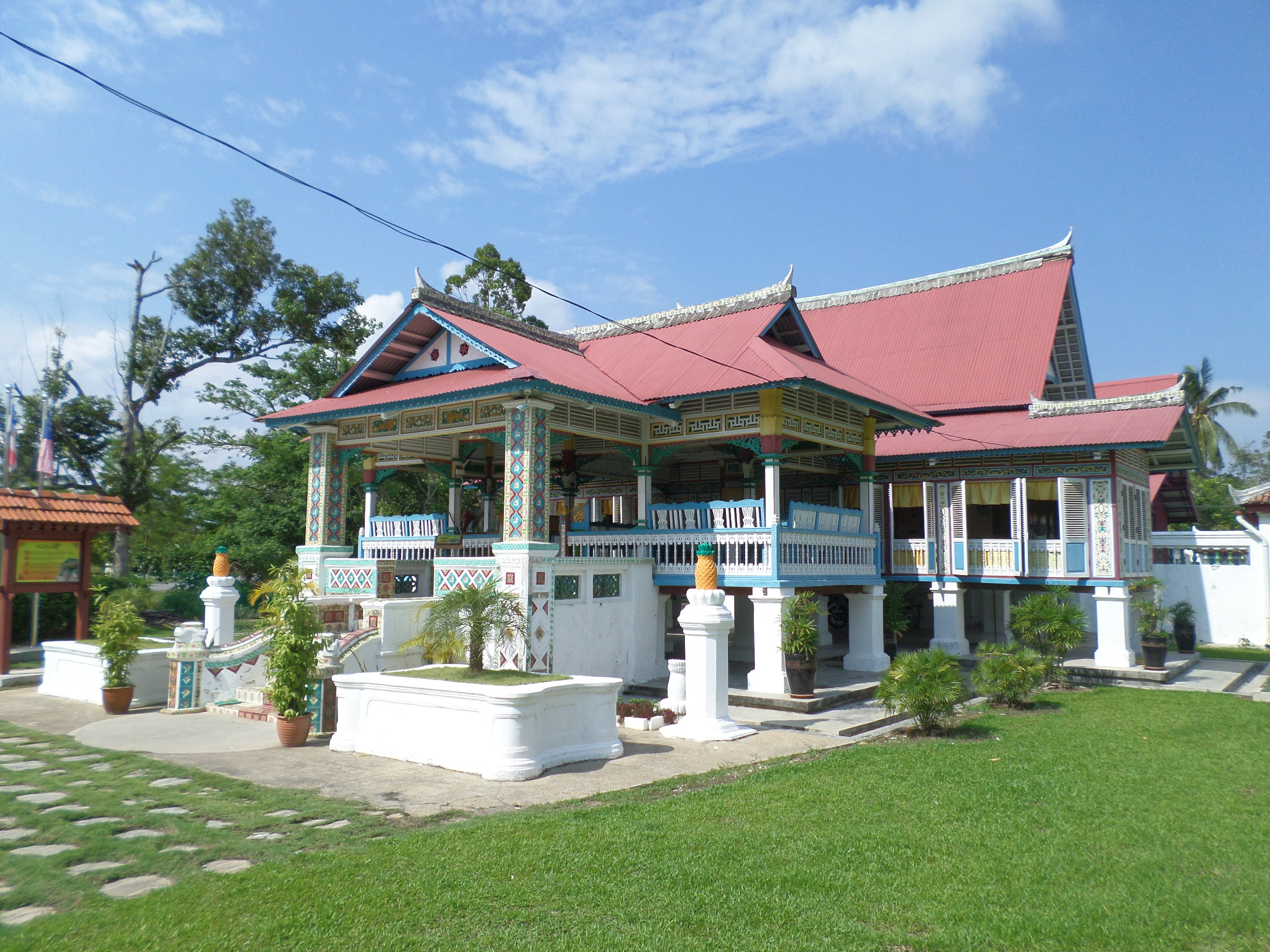
- Interactive map of the Demang Abdul Ghani Gallery area

General information
- Type: gallery
- Location: Merlimau, Jasin, Melaka, Malaysia
- Coordinates: 2°08′27.4″N 102°25′29.2″E
- Completed: 1894
- Opened: February 2011
- Cost: MYR33,000

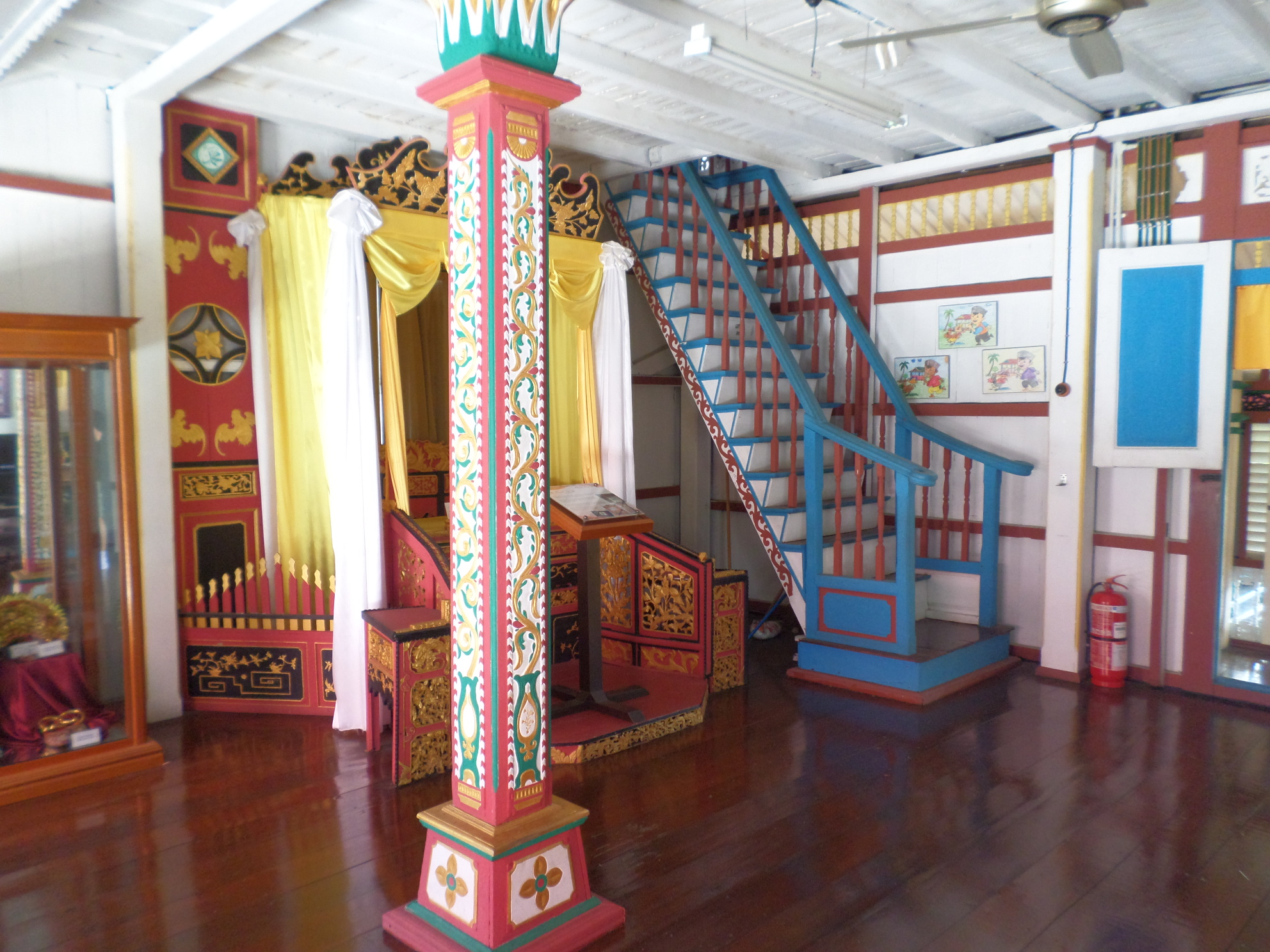
Demang Abdul Ghani Gallery interior

The Demang Abdul Ghani Gallery (Malay: Rumah Penghulu Abdul Ghani) is a gallery about Demang Abdul Ghani, whose ancestor came from Palembang and his family. The gallery building, sometimes called the Merlimau Palace, was the administrative centre of the village in the past and often used as a meeting place to discuss community affairs.

== History ==
The gallery building is a house, which was used as the It was built in 1894 by Abdul Ghani . Generations that had lived in the house were Abdul Majid in 1831–1834, Demang Abdul Ghani in 1834-1934 and Mat Natar in 1934–1978.

In 2008, conservation work was carried out to the building. The gallery was finally opened in February 2011.

== Architecture ==
The gallery is a traditional Malay house with the influence of Palembang, Champa and the Philippines. High quality of wood was used to construct the house, namely Merbau, Cengal and teak. Chinese tiles are used for the roof. There are two water tanks to clean feet in front of the stairs with pumpkins and pineapple motifs. The house is rich with various patterns of carving of flora and fauna. The house has six main sections, which are the porch, veranda, main house, living room, bedroom, kitchen and loft.

== Opening time ==
The gallery is opened everyday except Monday from 9 a.m. to 5.30 p.m.

== See also ==
- List of tourist attractions in Melaka
