= Malacca Sultanate Watermill =

Watermill in Malacca City, Malacca, Malaysia

- Kincir Air Kesultanan Melayu Melaka
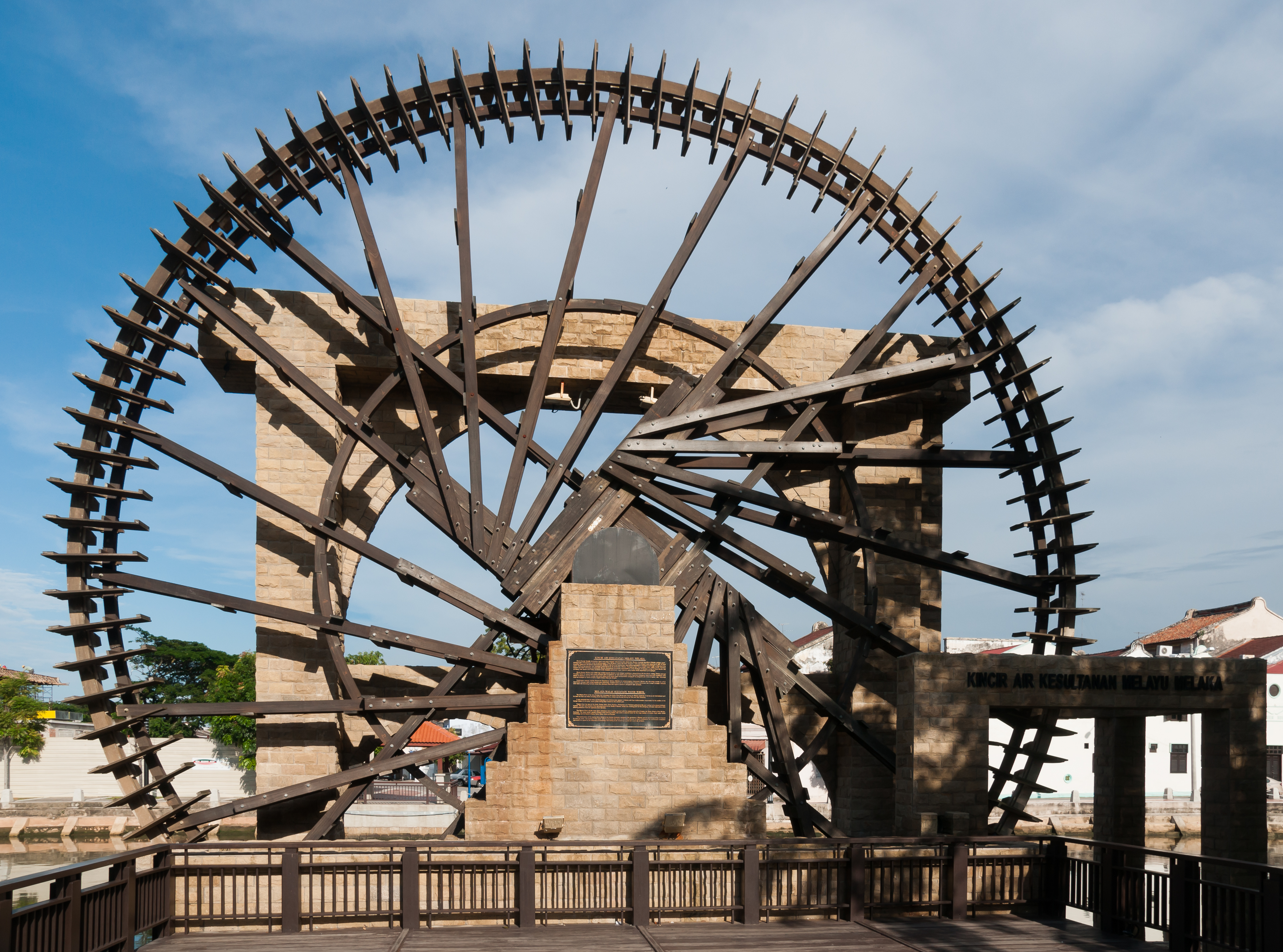
- Interactive map of the Malacca Sultanate Watermill area

General information
- Type: watermill
- Location: Malacca City, Malacca, Malaysia
- Coordinates: 2°11′38″N 102°14′52″E
- Construction started: 2007
- Completed: March 2008
- Cost: RM1.5 million

Height
- Height: 13 m (43 ft)

Malacca Sultanate Watermill (Malay: Kincir Air Kesultanan Melayu Melaka, lit. 'Malacca Malay Sultanate Watermill') is a replica watermill located along the bank of Malacca River in Malacca City, Malacca, Malaysia, which was built in 2007 and completed in March 2008. It is the first and largest watermill in Malaysia, standing at a height of 13 meters and was built based on Islamic technology found in Syria and China. The concrete structure is what remains nowadays, the wooden wheel is not present anymore and the attraction has fallen into decay.

== See also ==
- List of tourist attractions in Malacca
