= Alor Gajah British Graveyard =

Burial yard for British soldiers in Malacca, Malaysia

- Kubur Inggeris Alor Gajah
- Interactive map of Alor Gajah British Graveyard

Details
- Location: Sekolah Kebangsaan Alor Gajah 1, 78000 Alor Gajah, Melaka
- Country: Malaysia
- Coordinates: 2.3842°N 102.2101°E
- Type: Historic
- No. of graves: 3

The Alor Gajah British Graveyard is a notable historical place in Alor Gajah town, Malacca, Malaysia.

== See also ==
- List of tourist attractions in Malacca
