= List of tourist attractions in Malacca =

Tourist attractions in Malacca, Malaysia

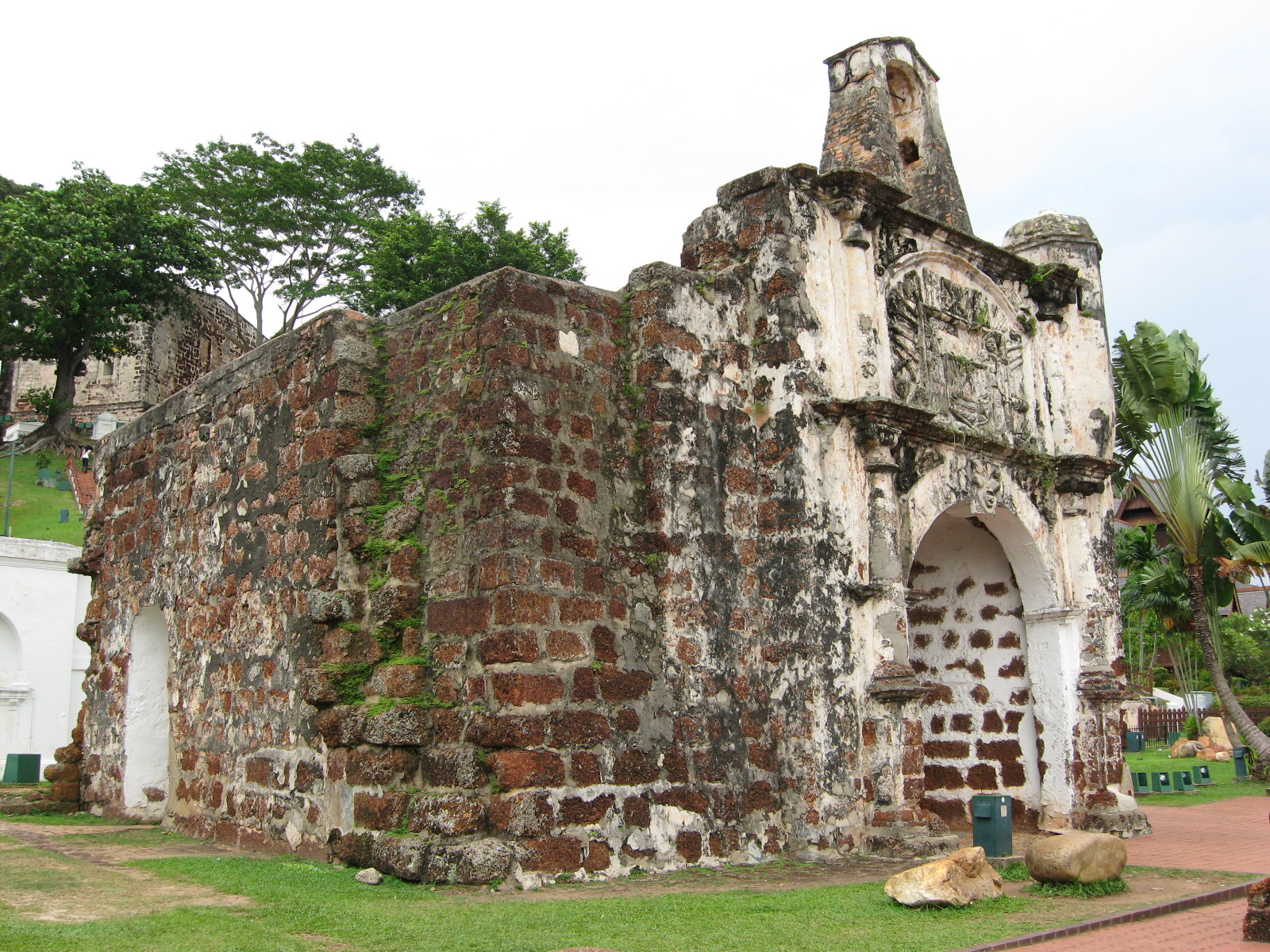
Porta de Santiago

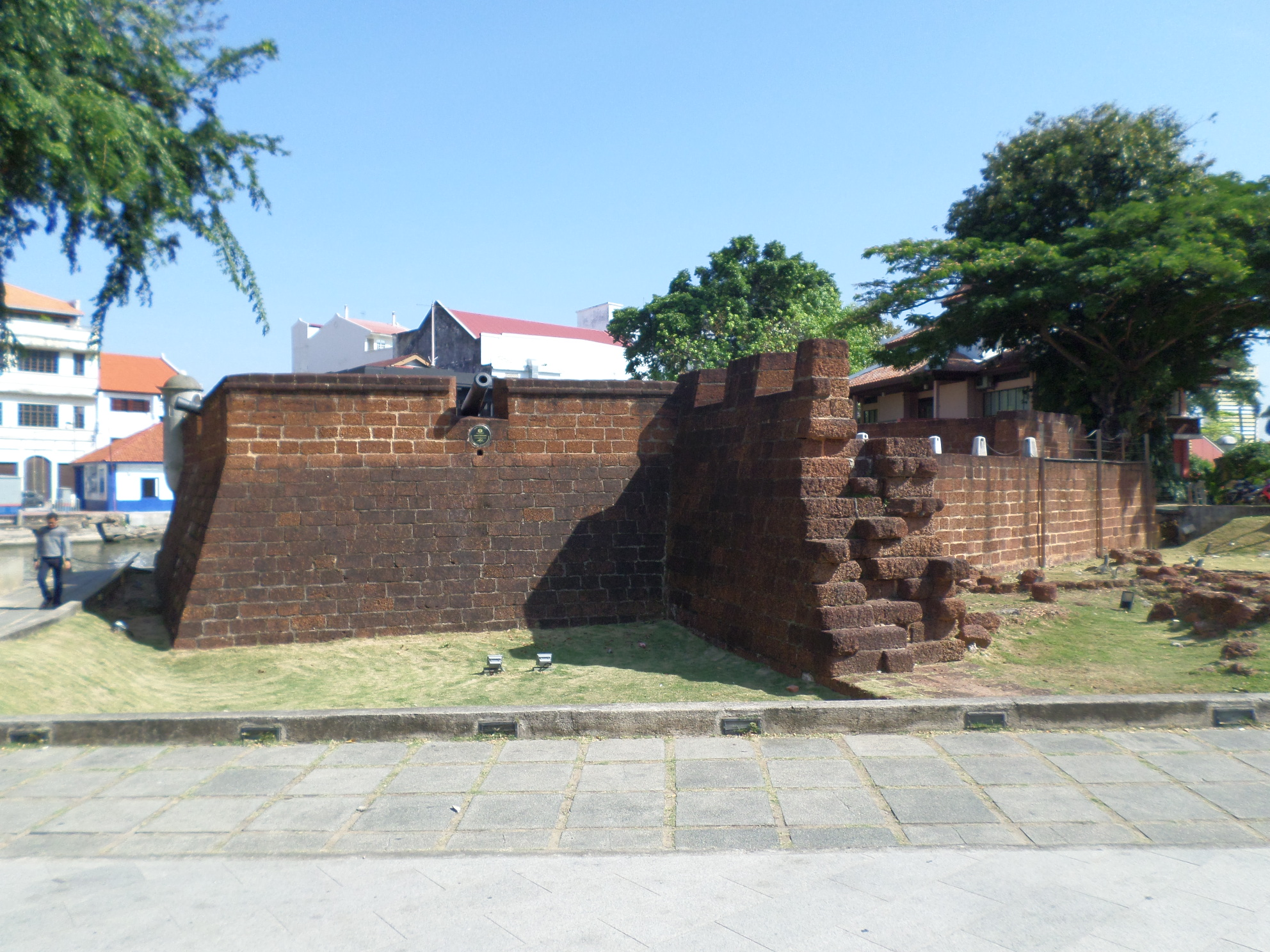
Middelburg Bastion

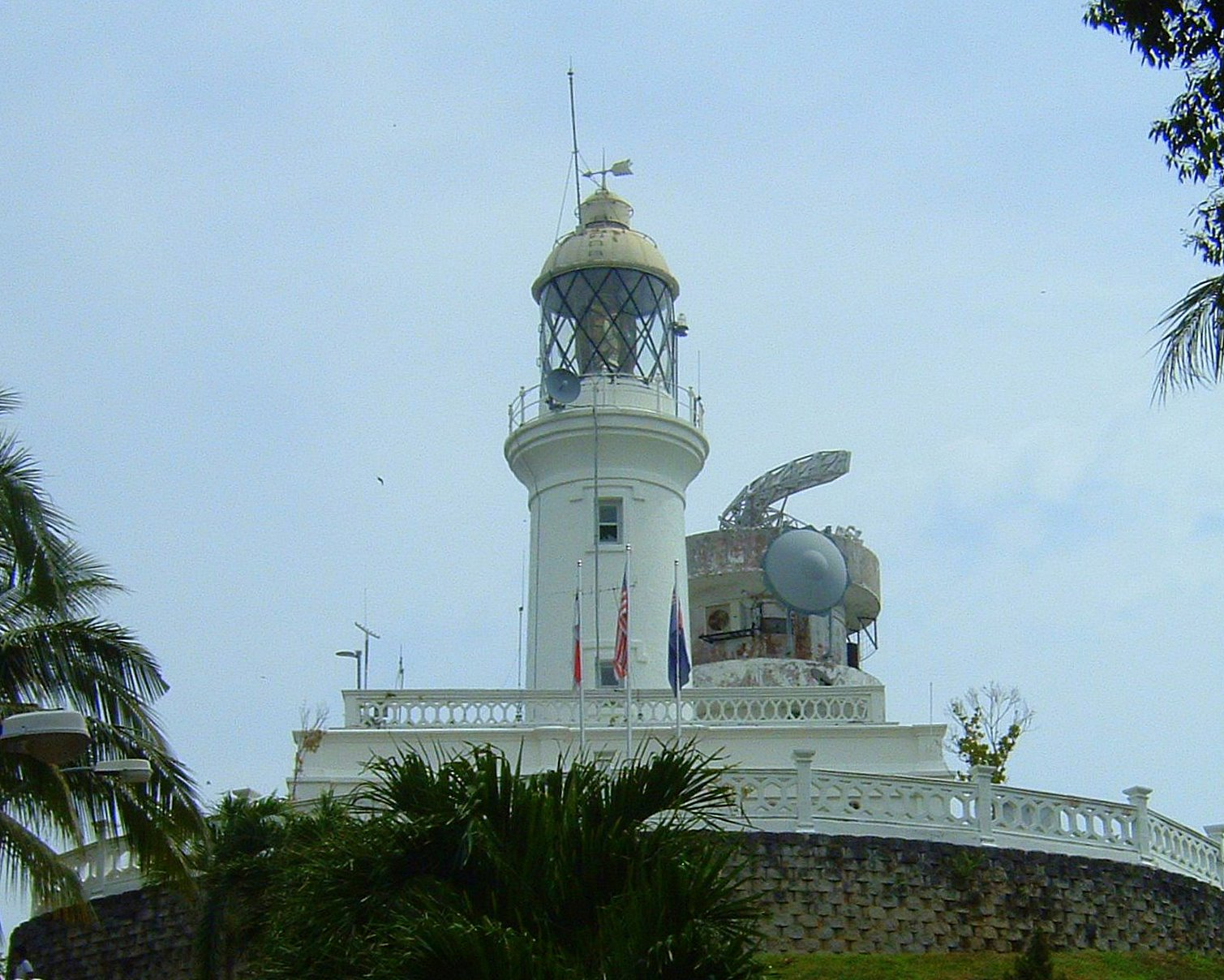
Cape Rachado Lighthouse

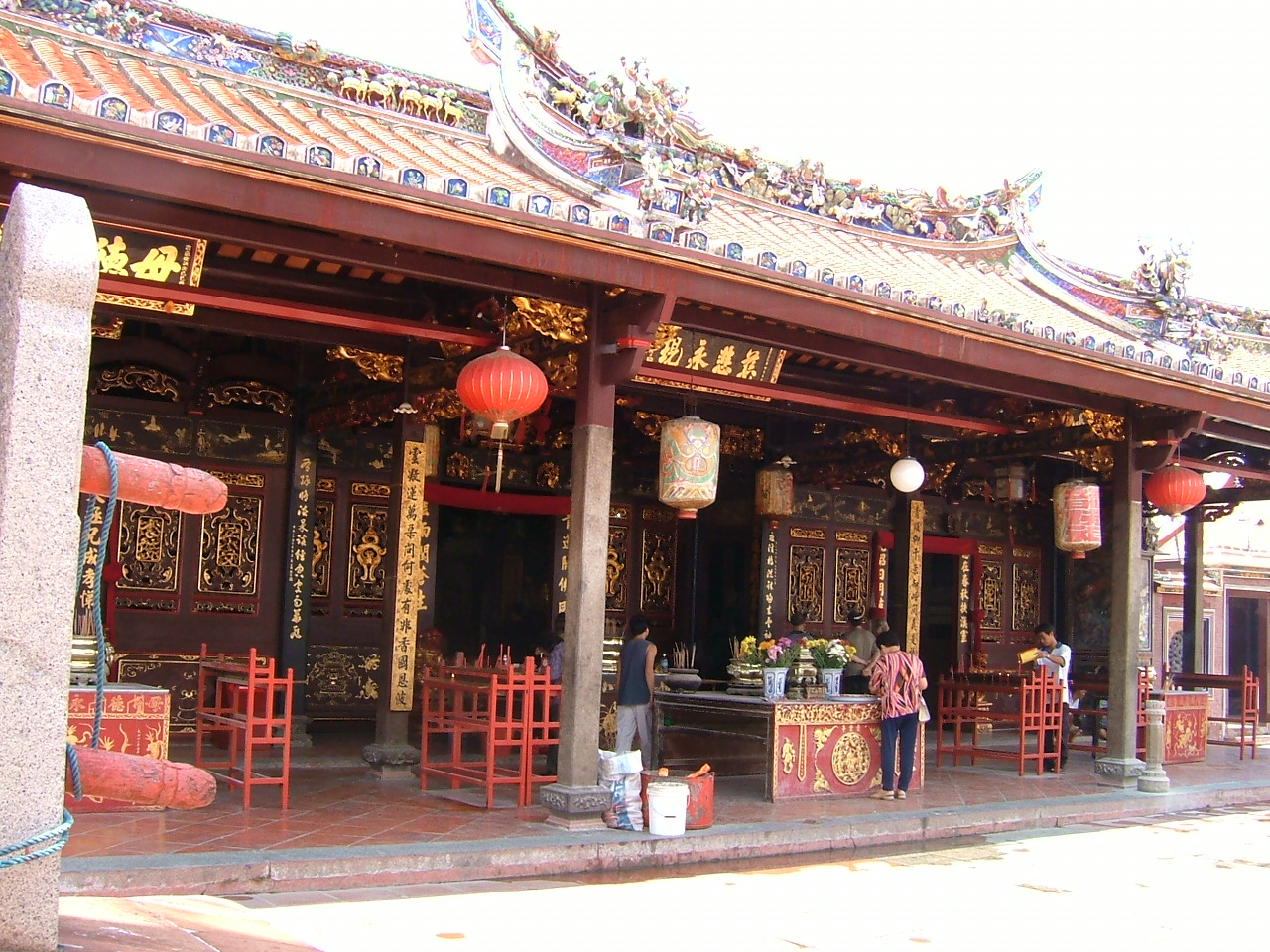
Cheng Hoon Teng Temple

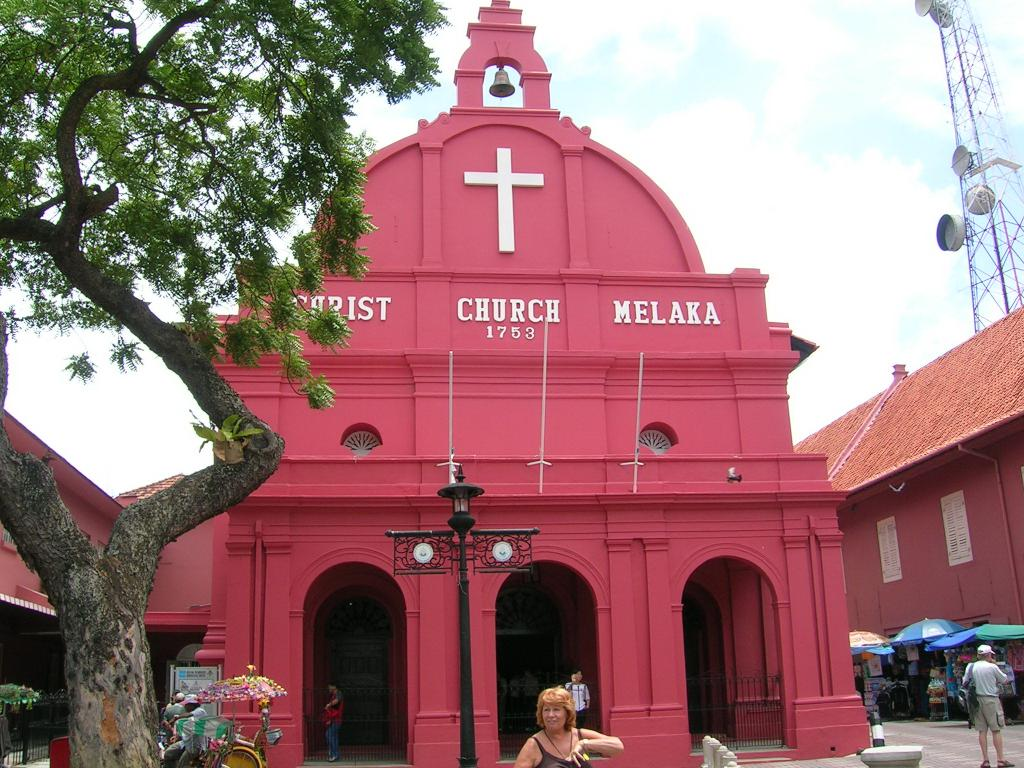
Christ Church, Malacca

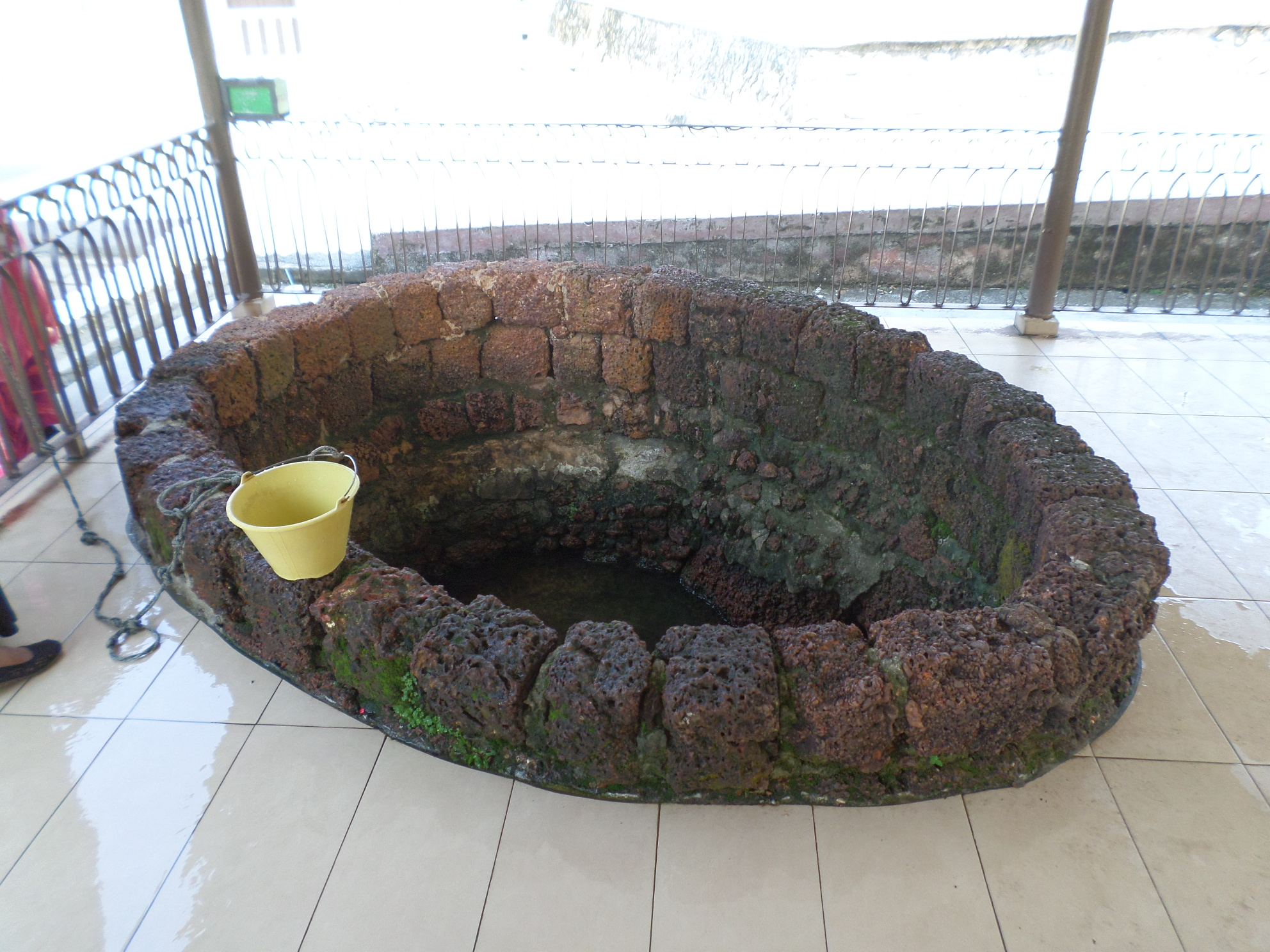
Hang Tuah's Well

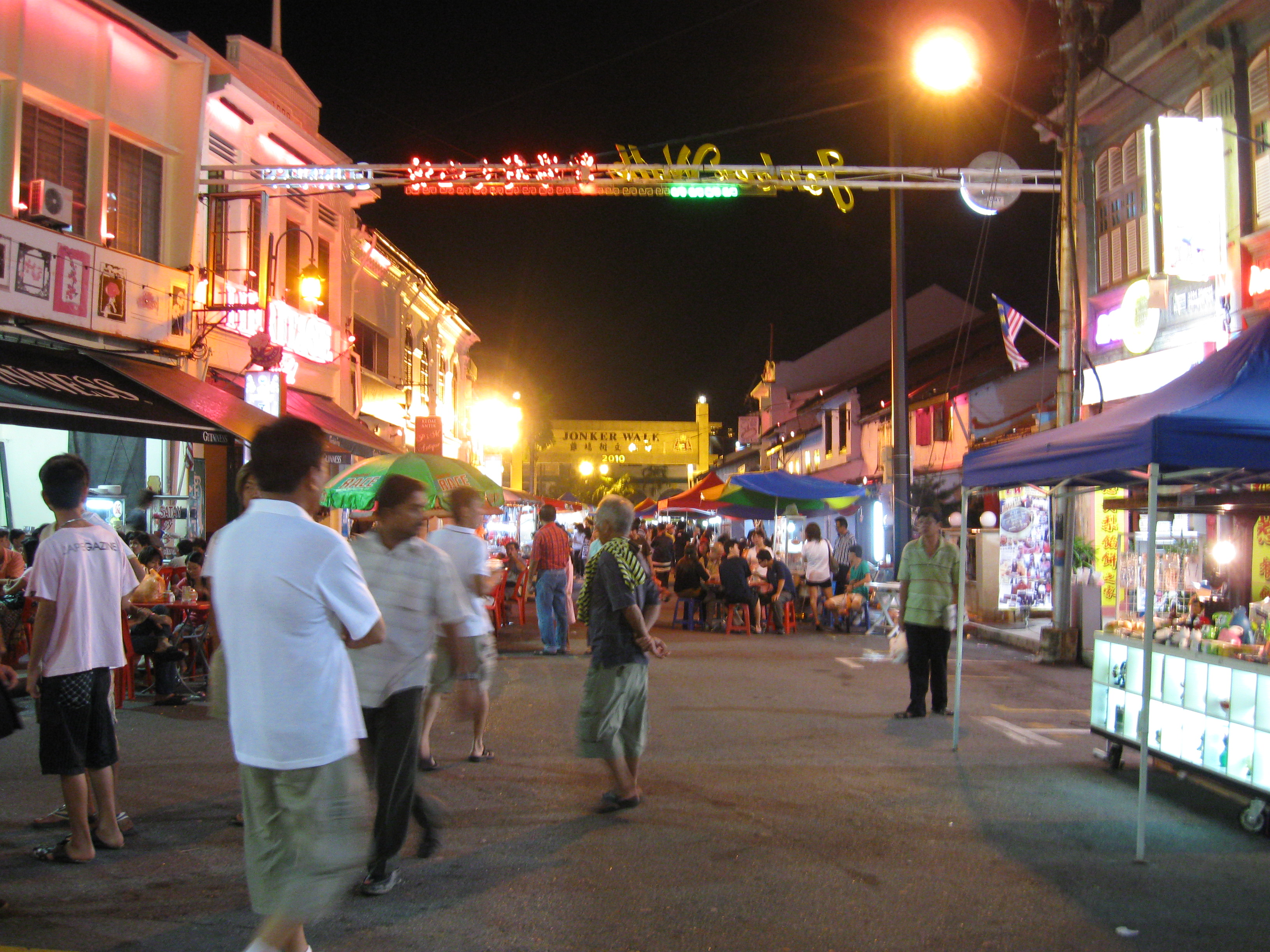
Jonker Walk

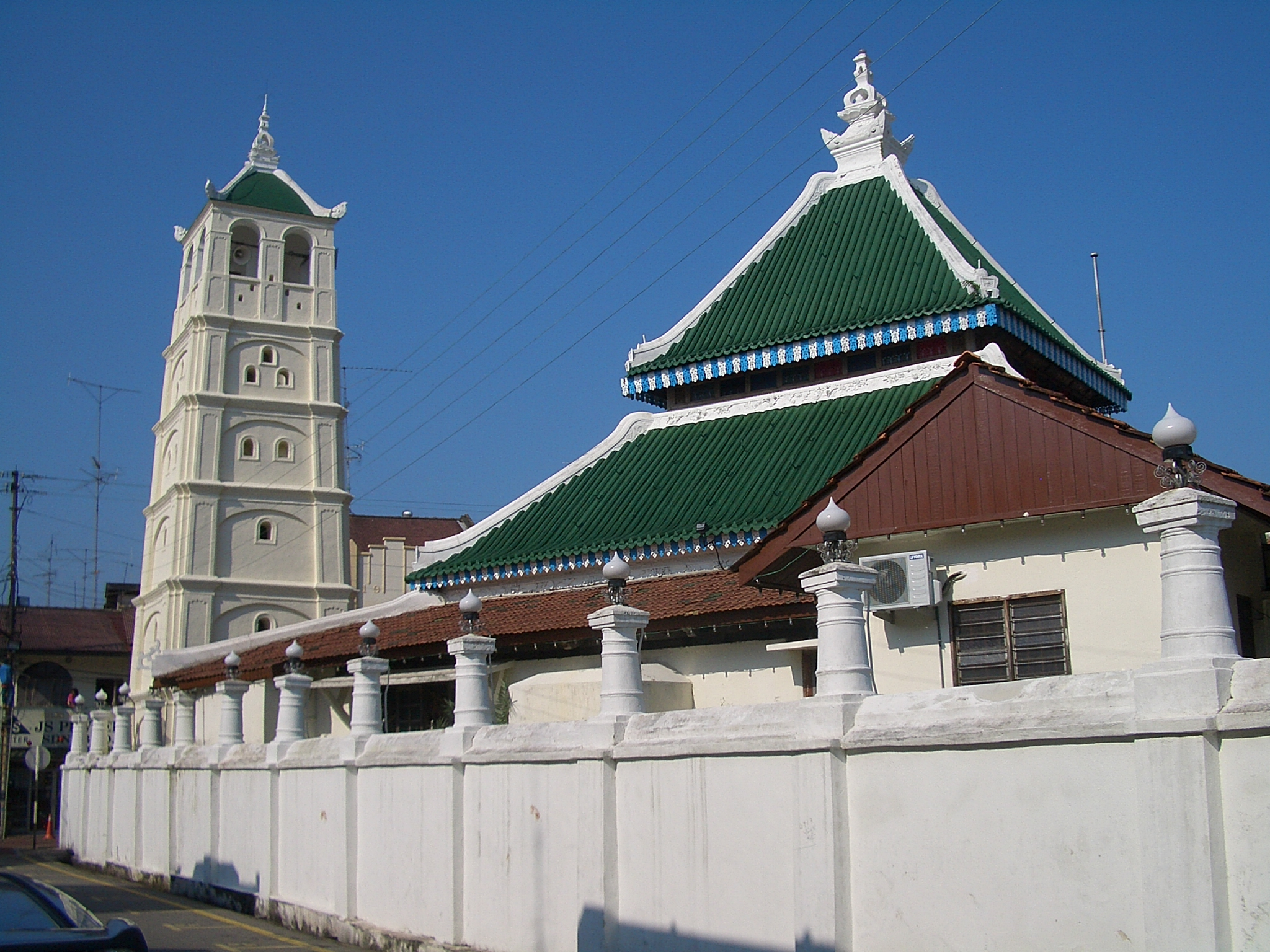
Kampung Kling Mosque

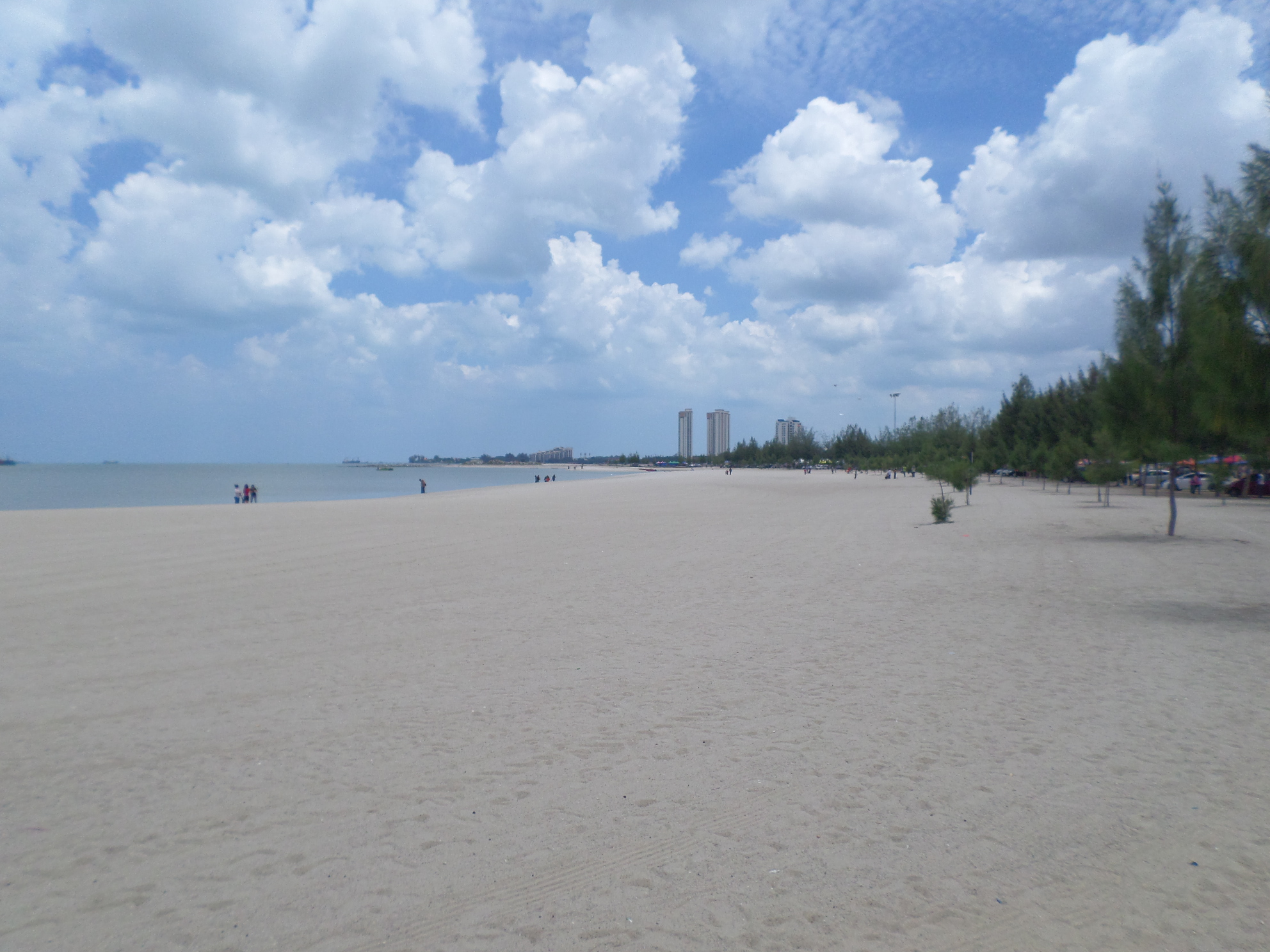
Klebang Beach

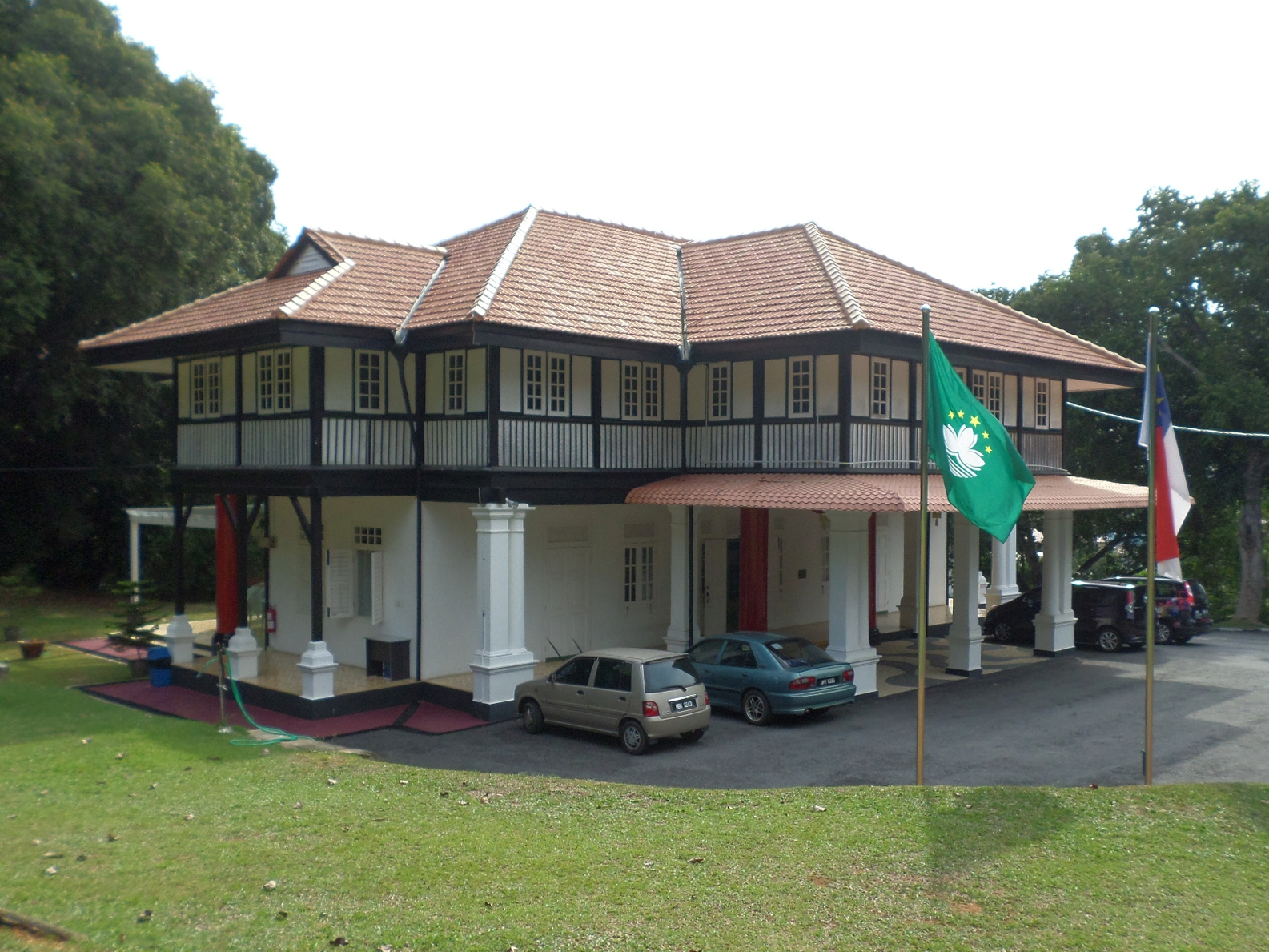
Macau Gallery Malacca

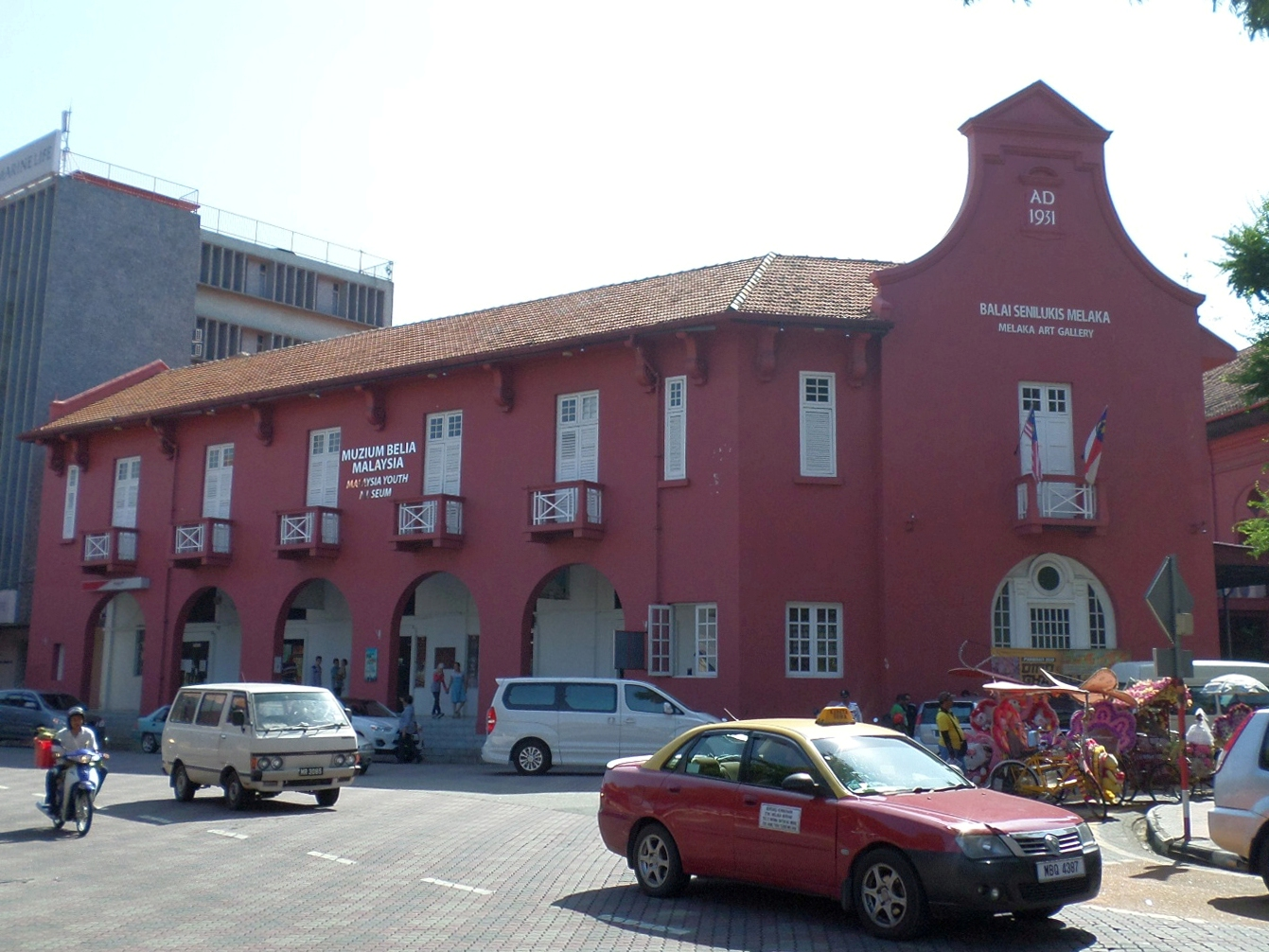
Malacca Art Gallery

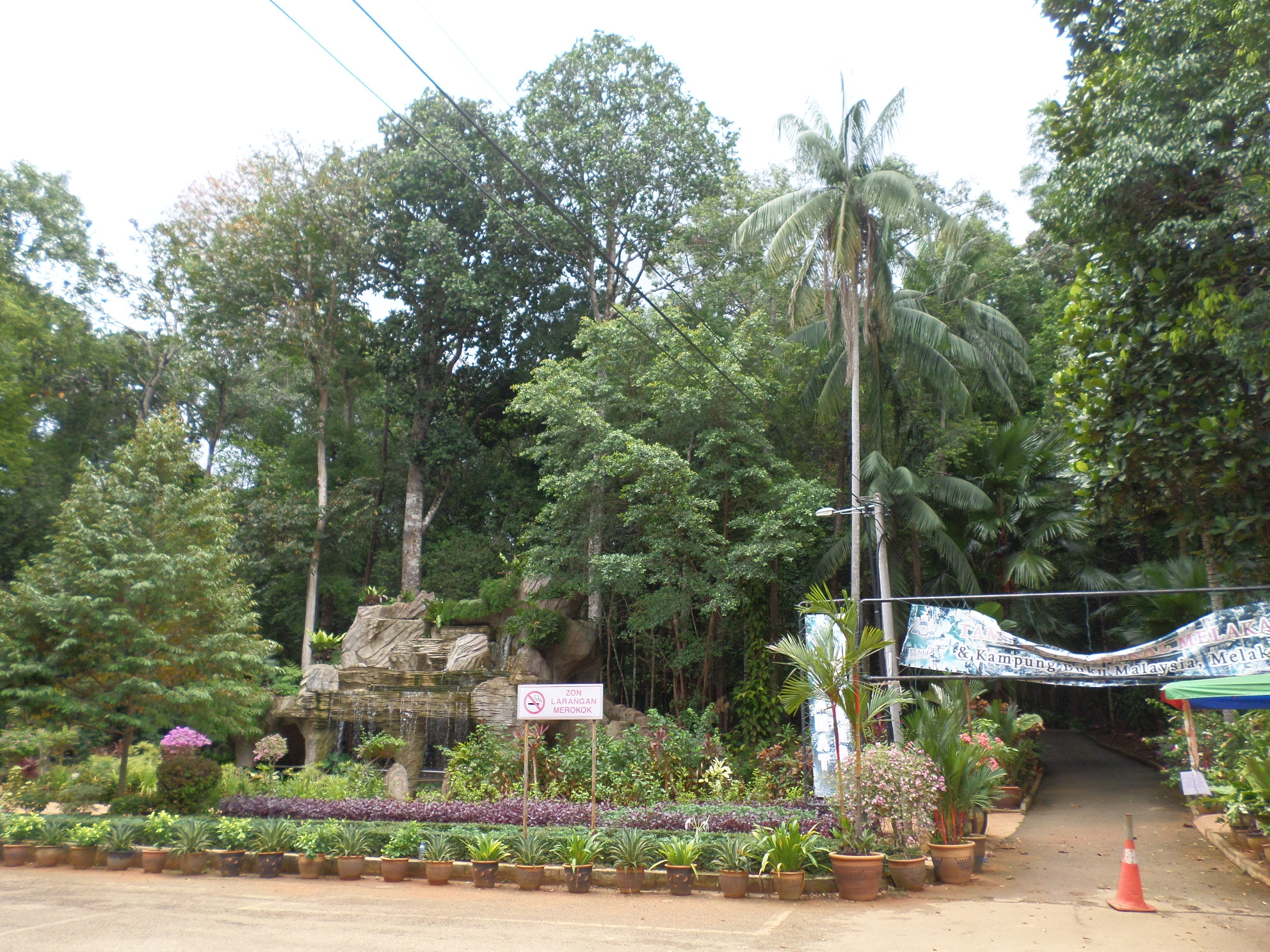
Malacca Botanical Garden

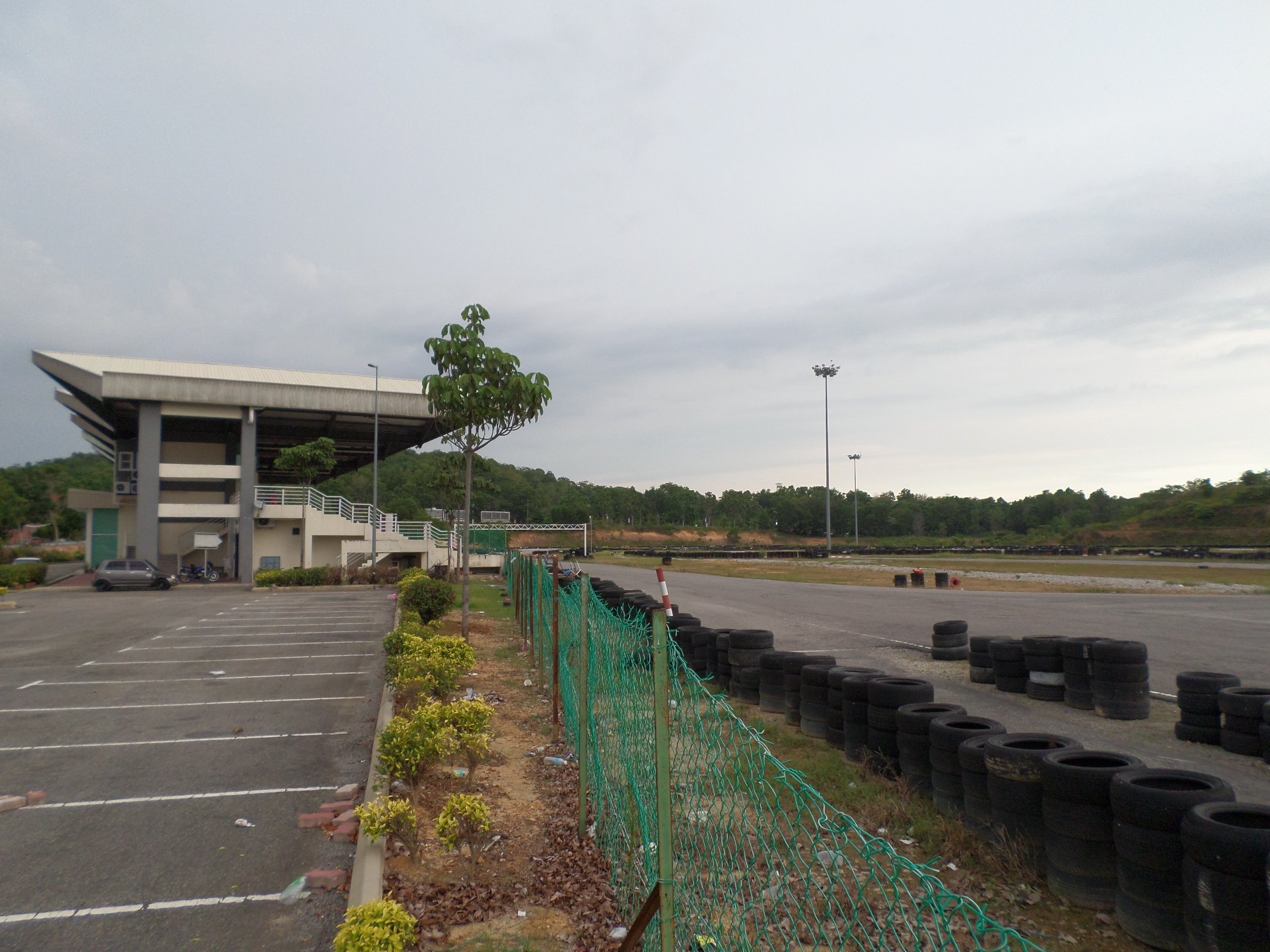
Malacca International Motorsport Circuit

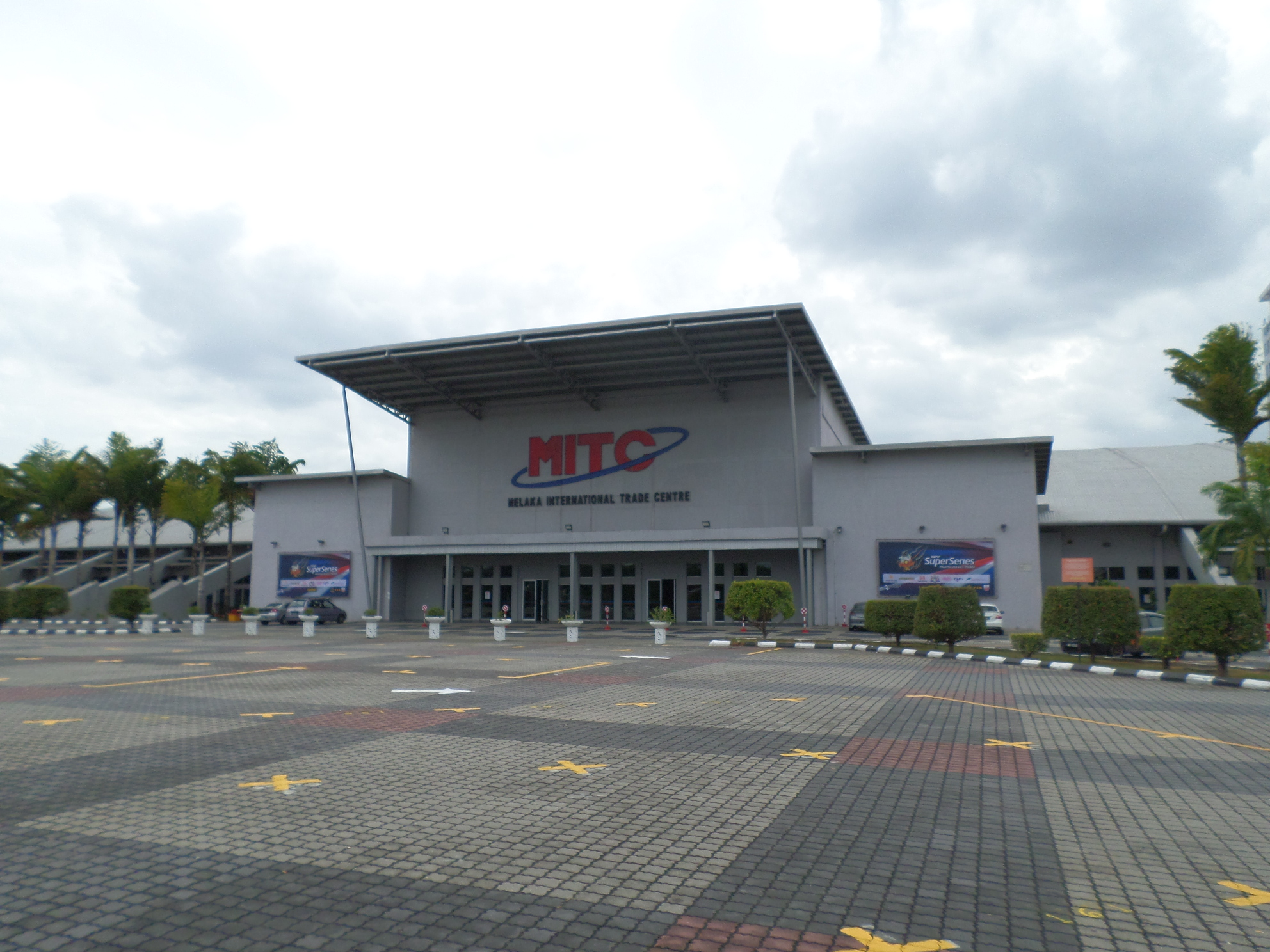
Malacca International Trade Centre

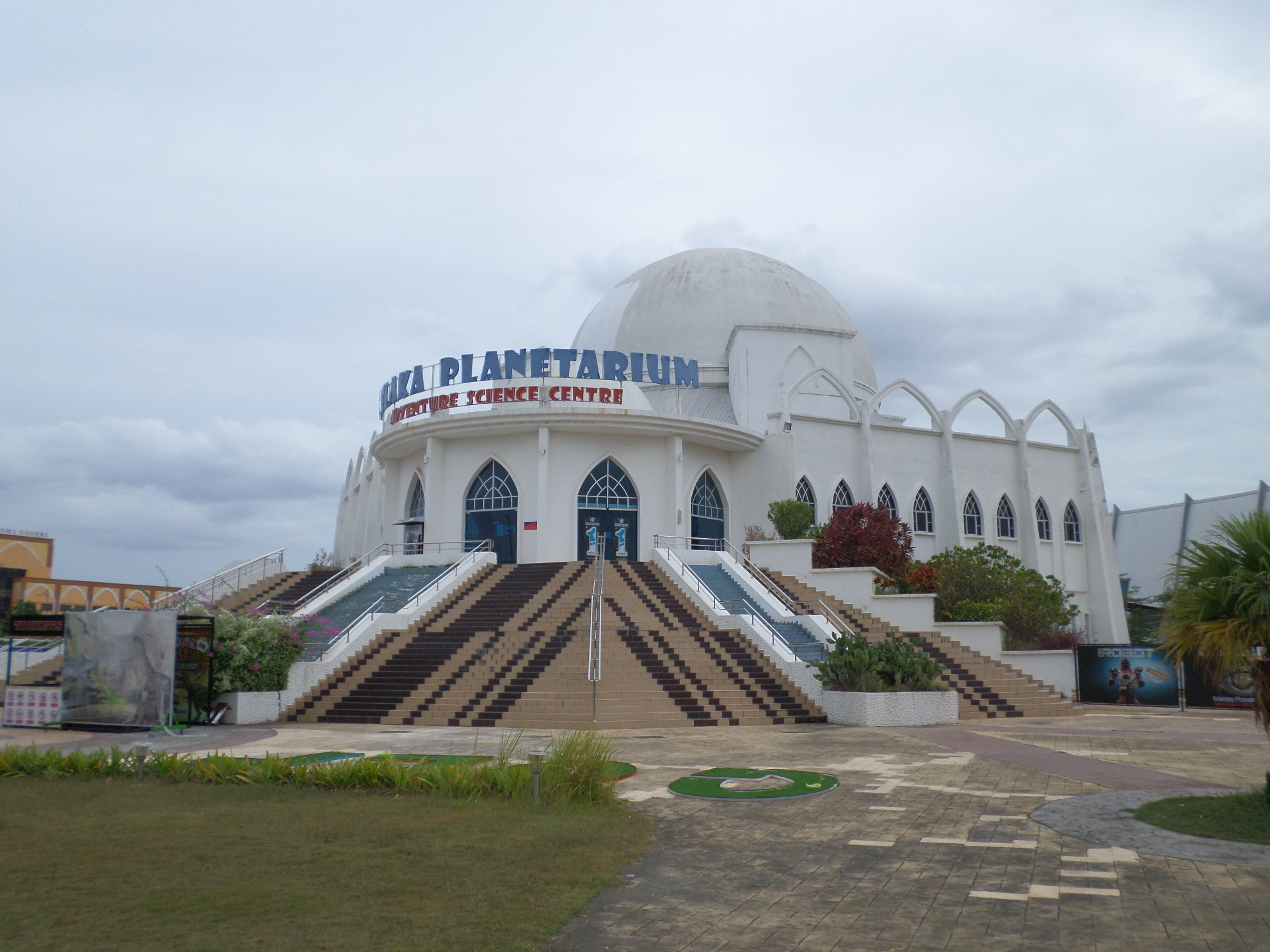
Malacca Planetarium

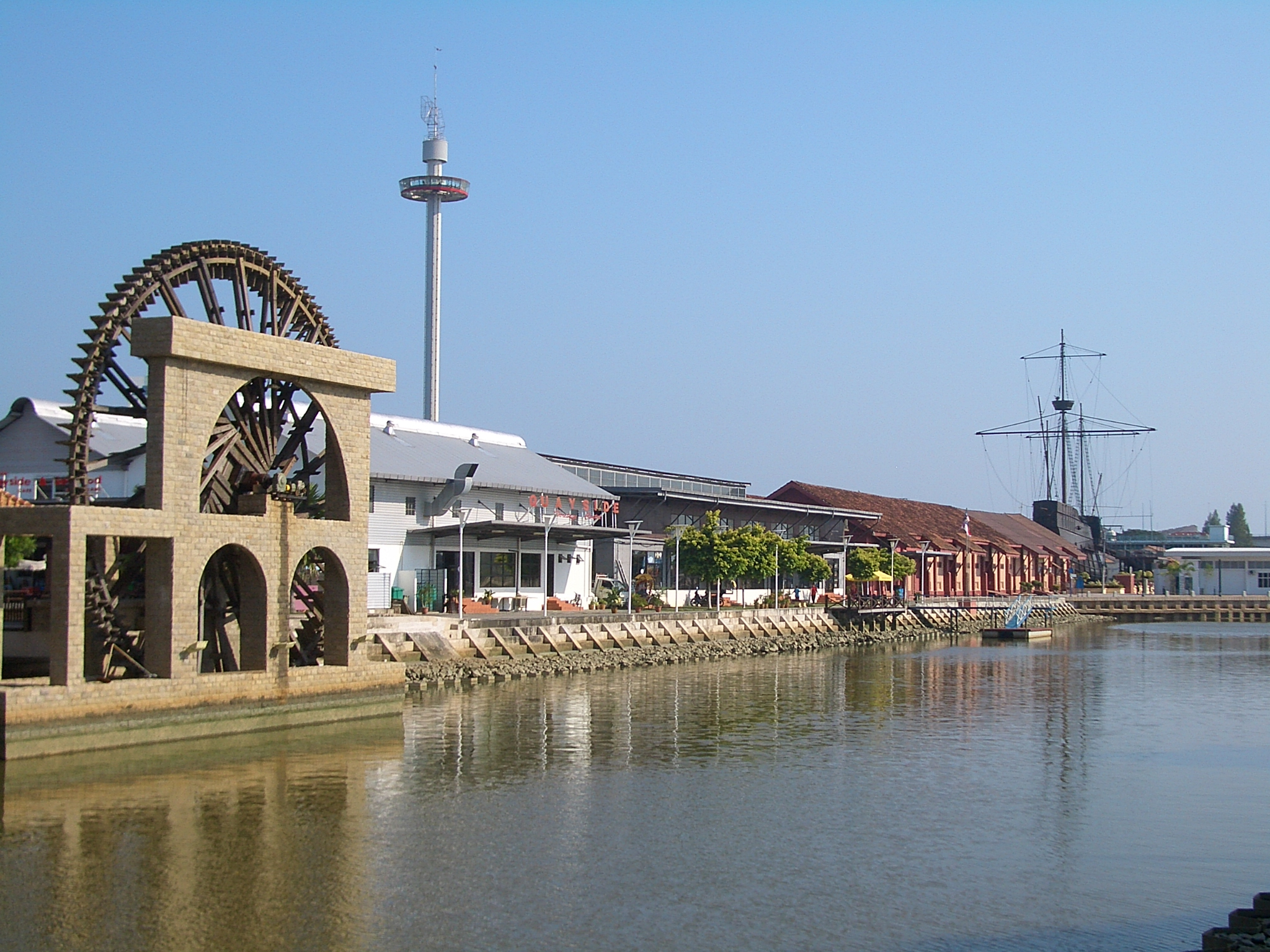
Malacca River

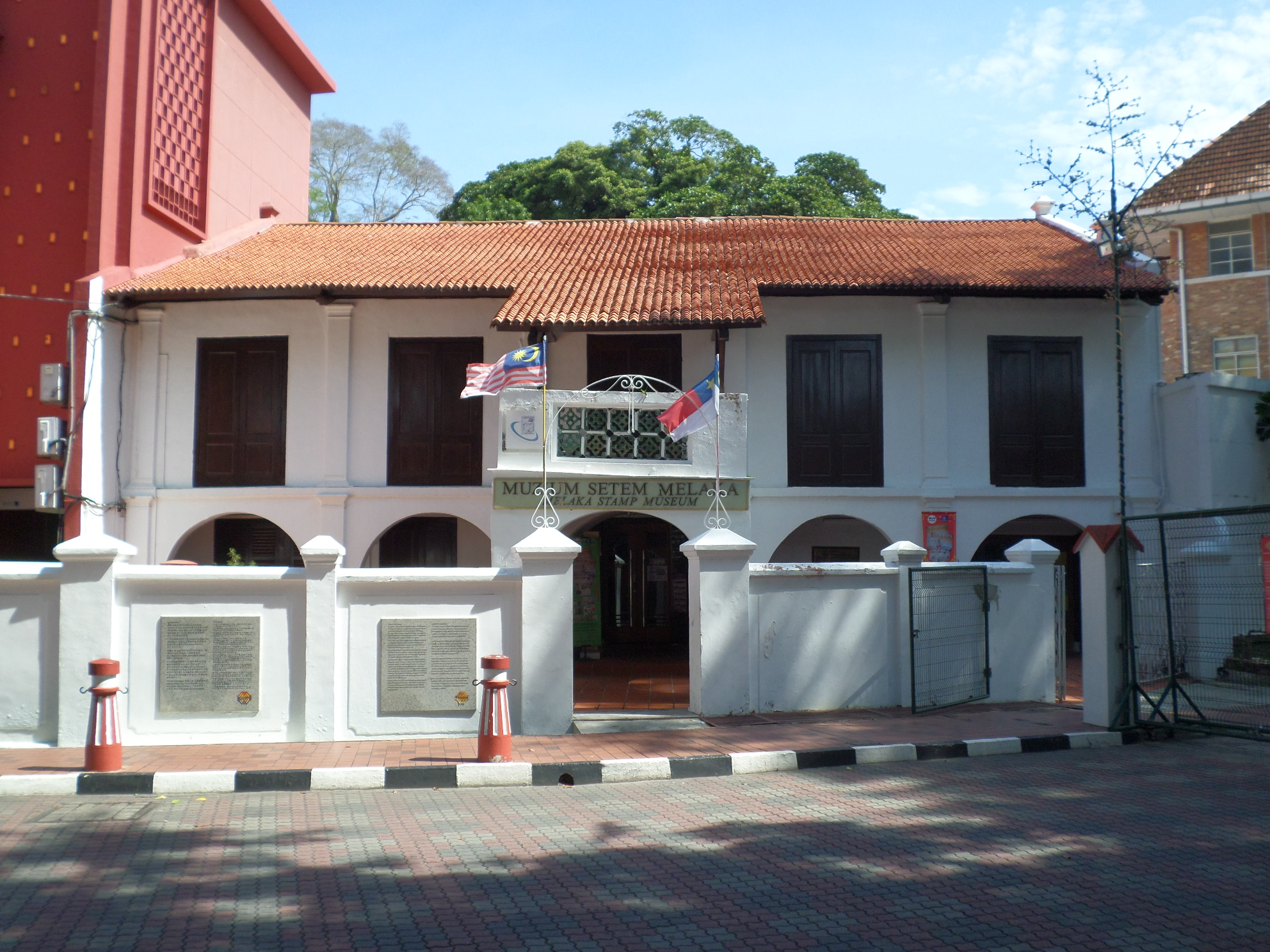
Malacca Stamp Museum

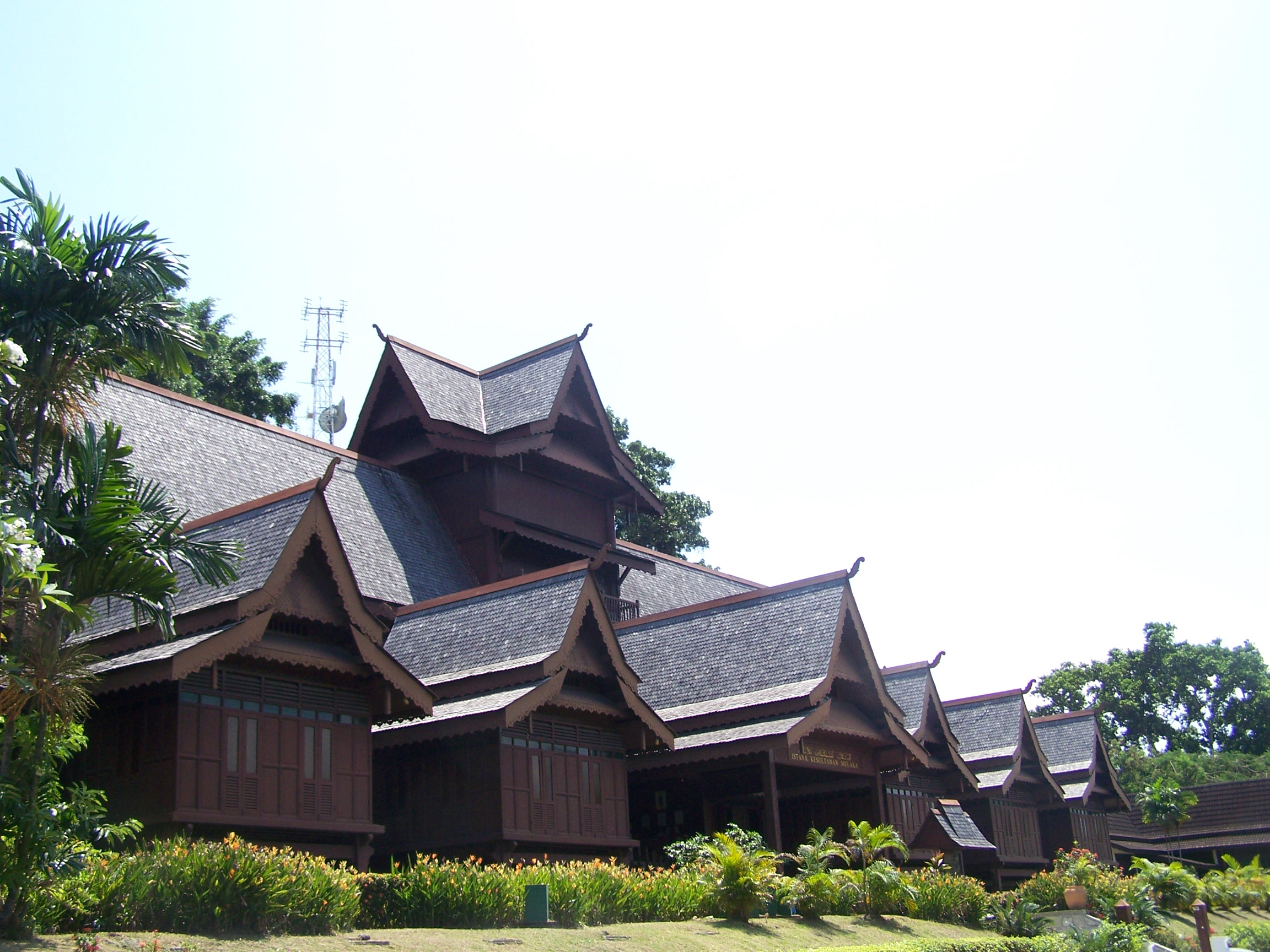
Malacca Sultanate Palace Museum

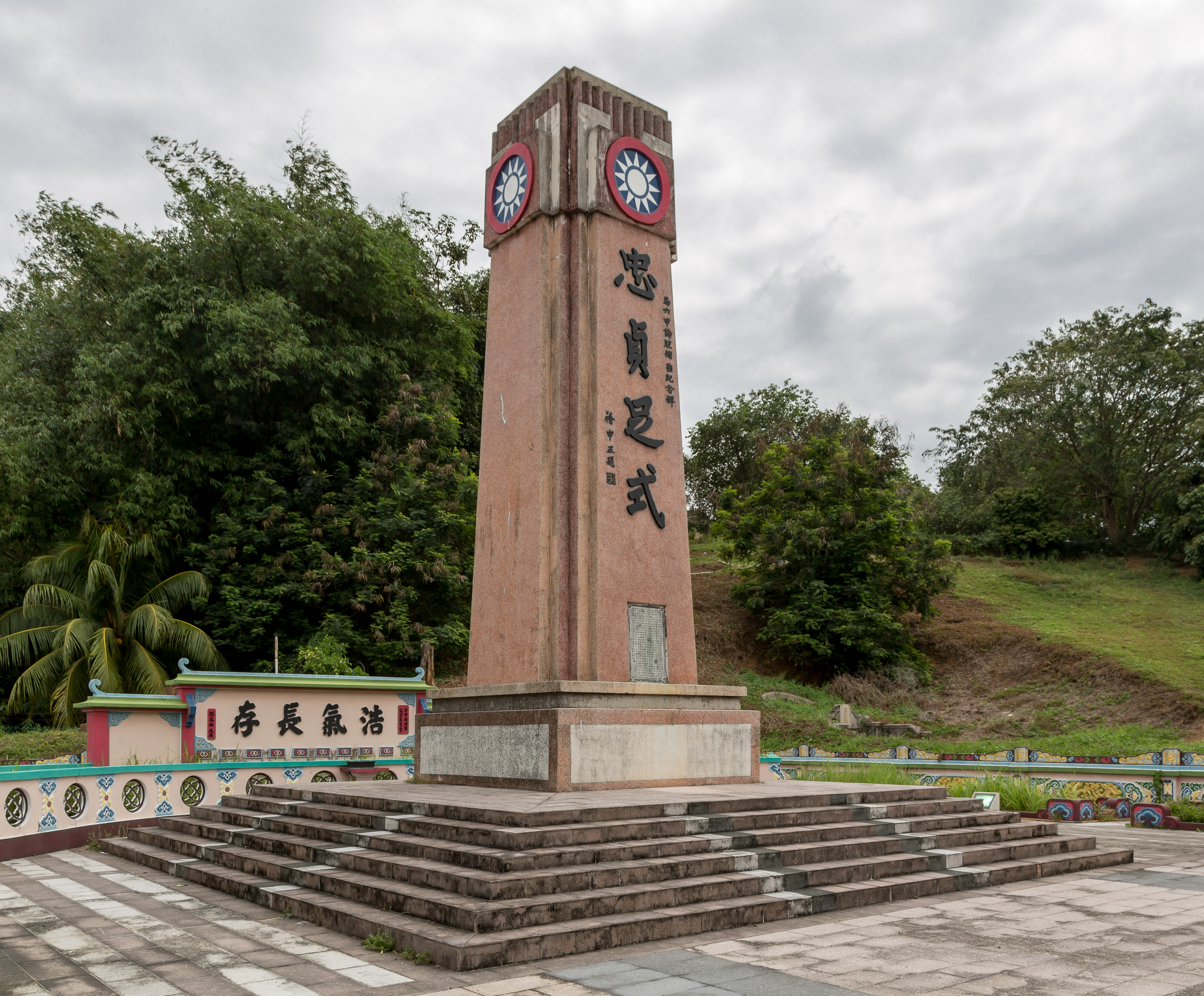
Malacca Warrior Monument

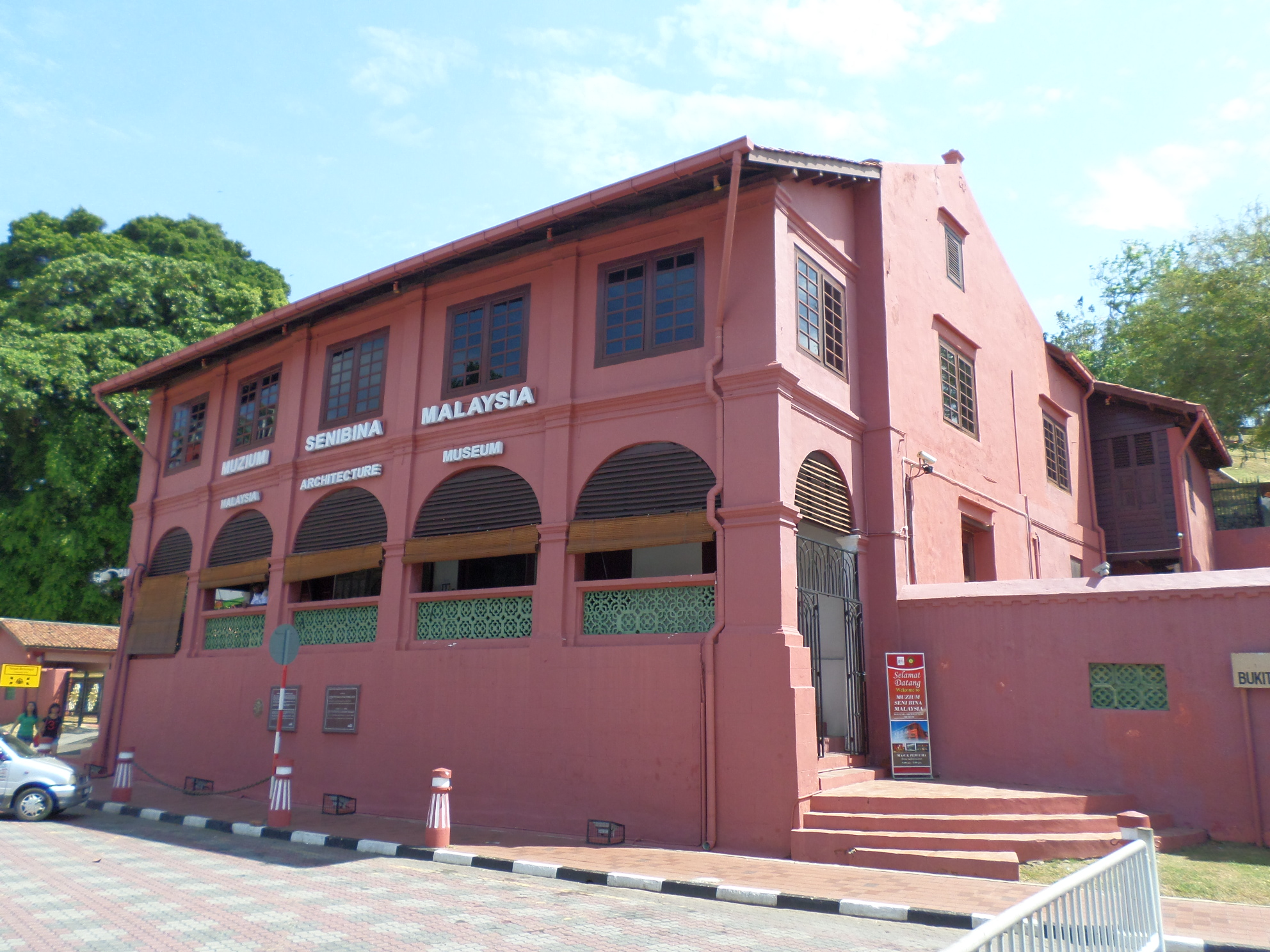
Malaysia Architecture Museum

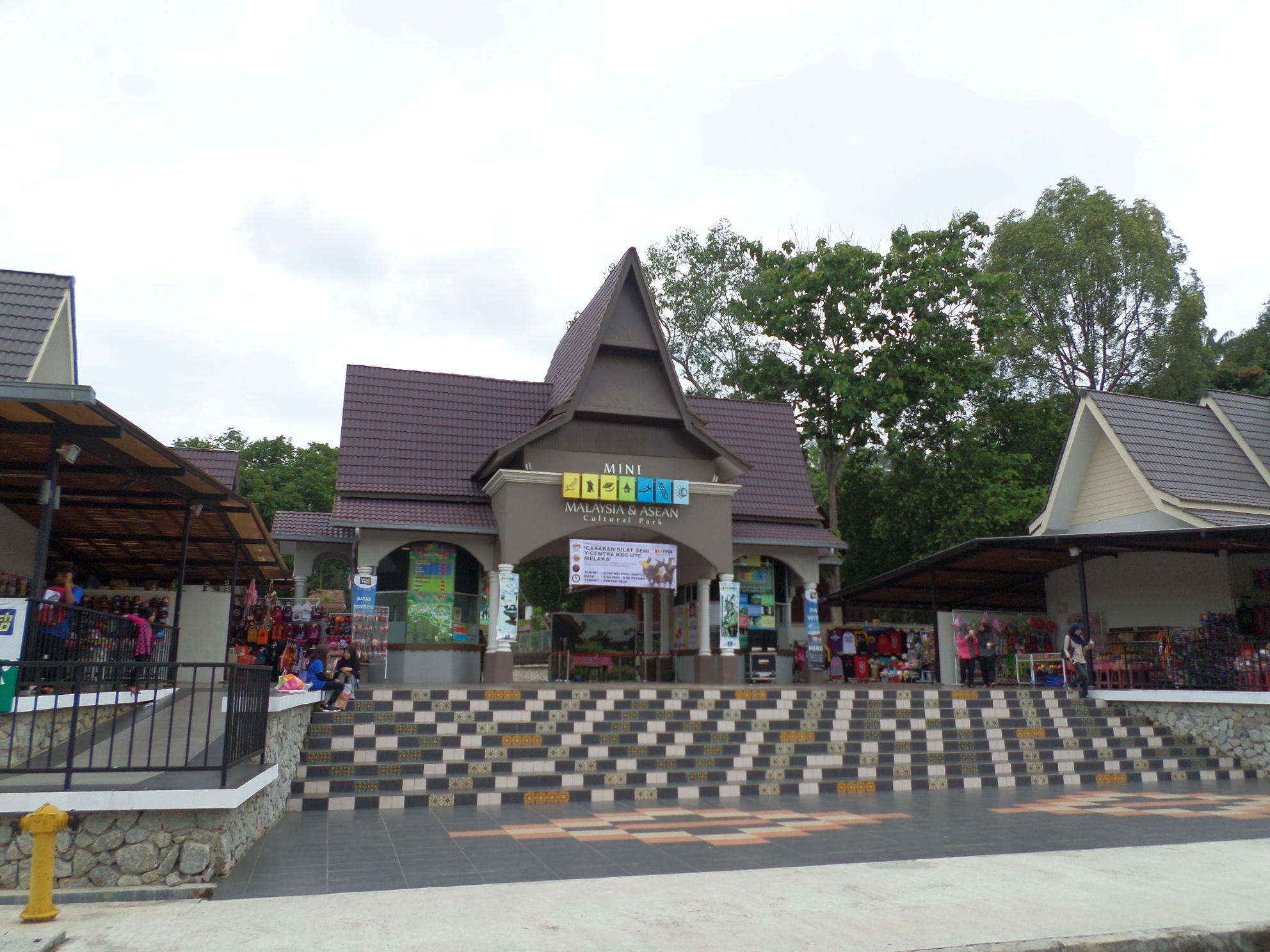
Mini Malaysia and ASEAN Cultural Park

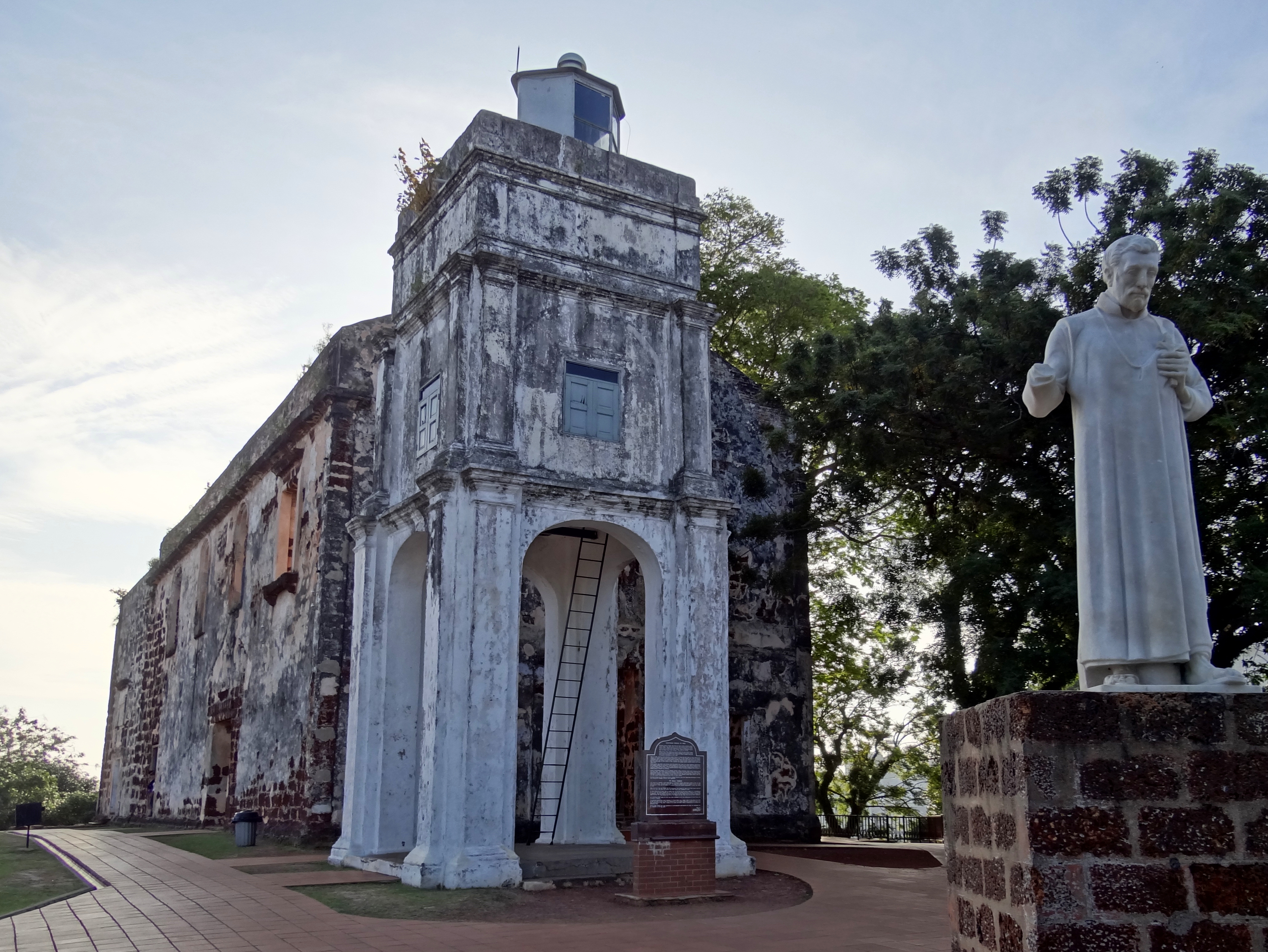
Ruins of St. Paul's Church

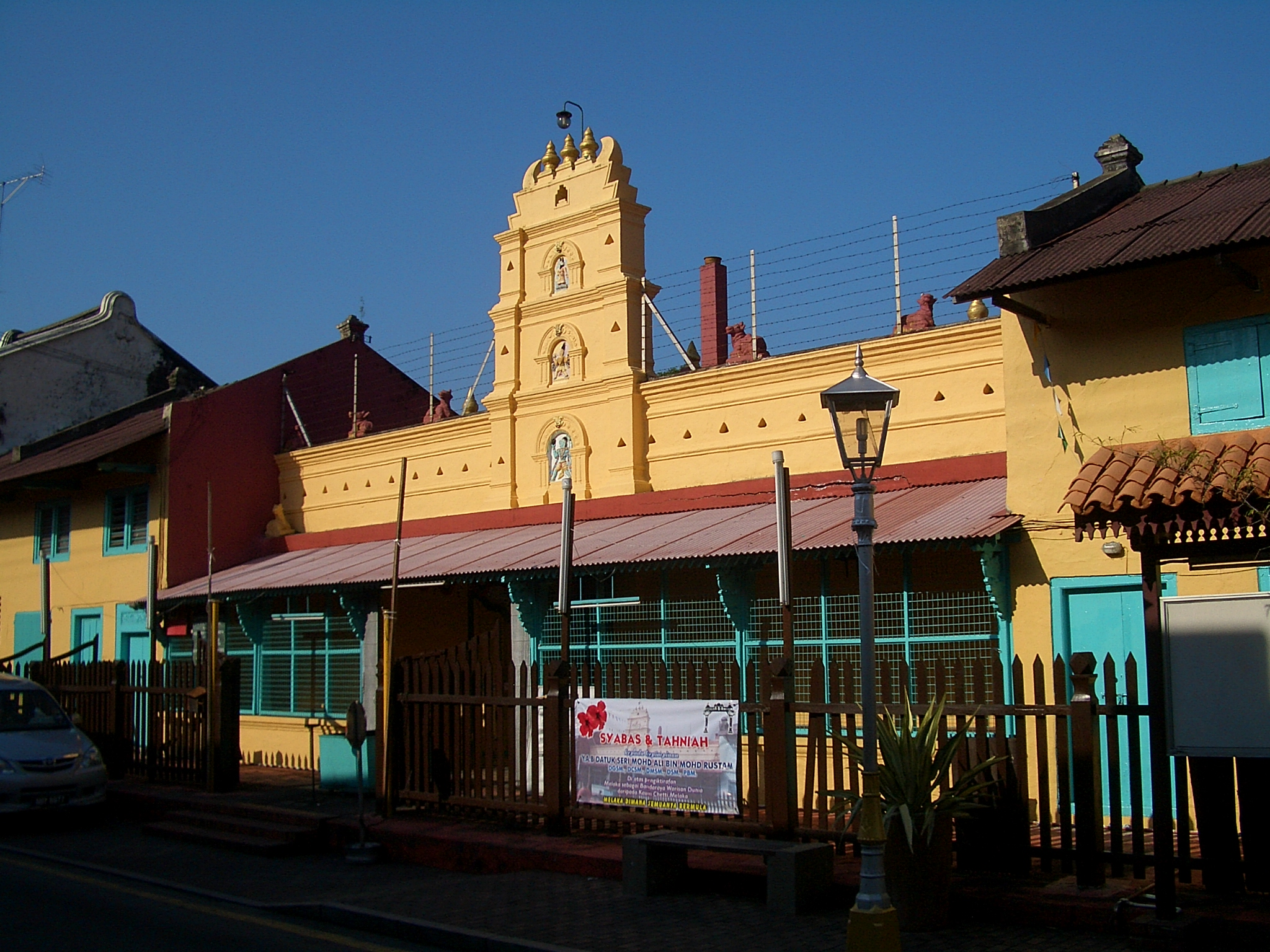
Sri Poyatha Moorthi Temple

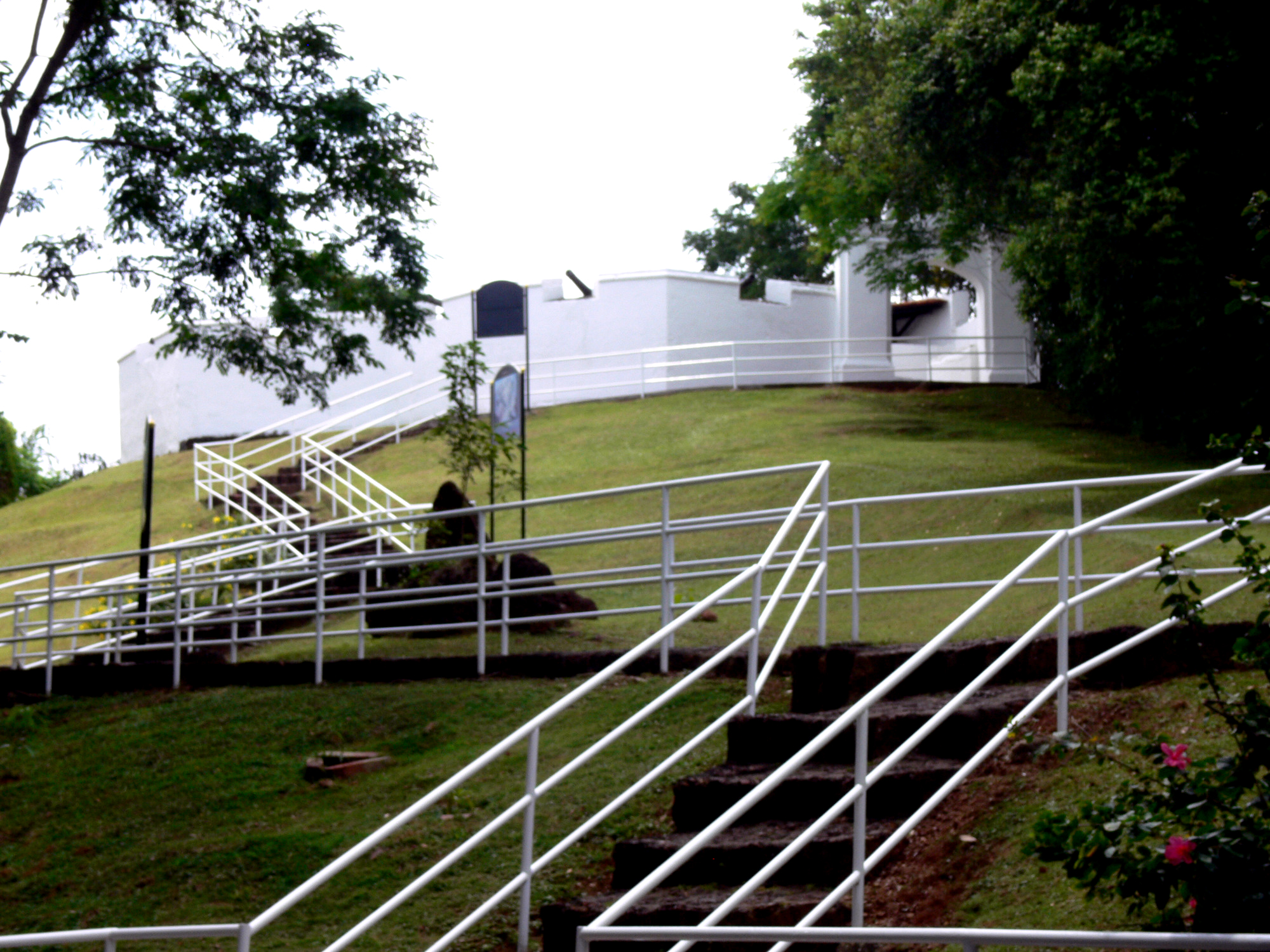
St. John's Fort

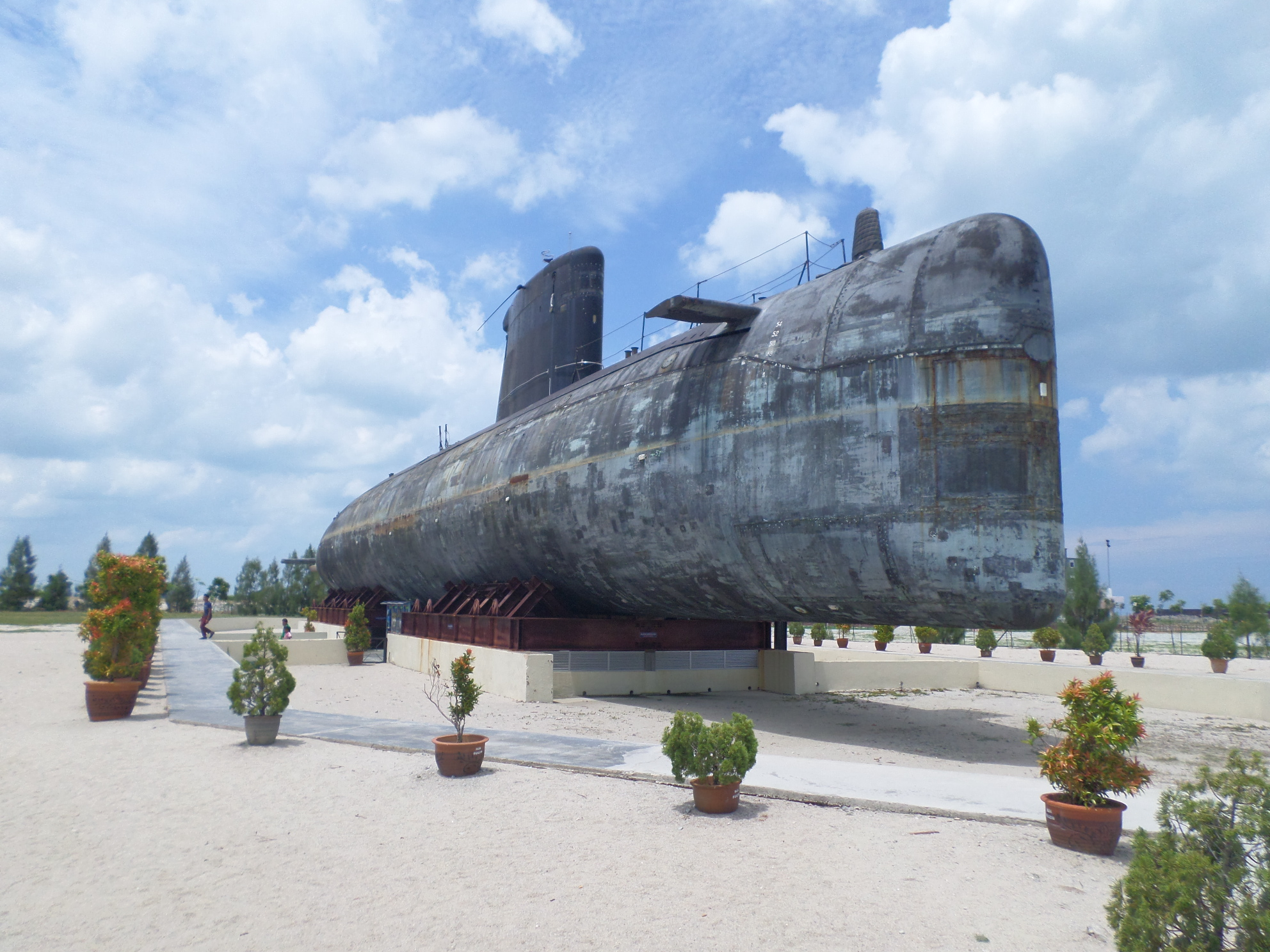
Submarine Museum

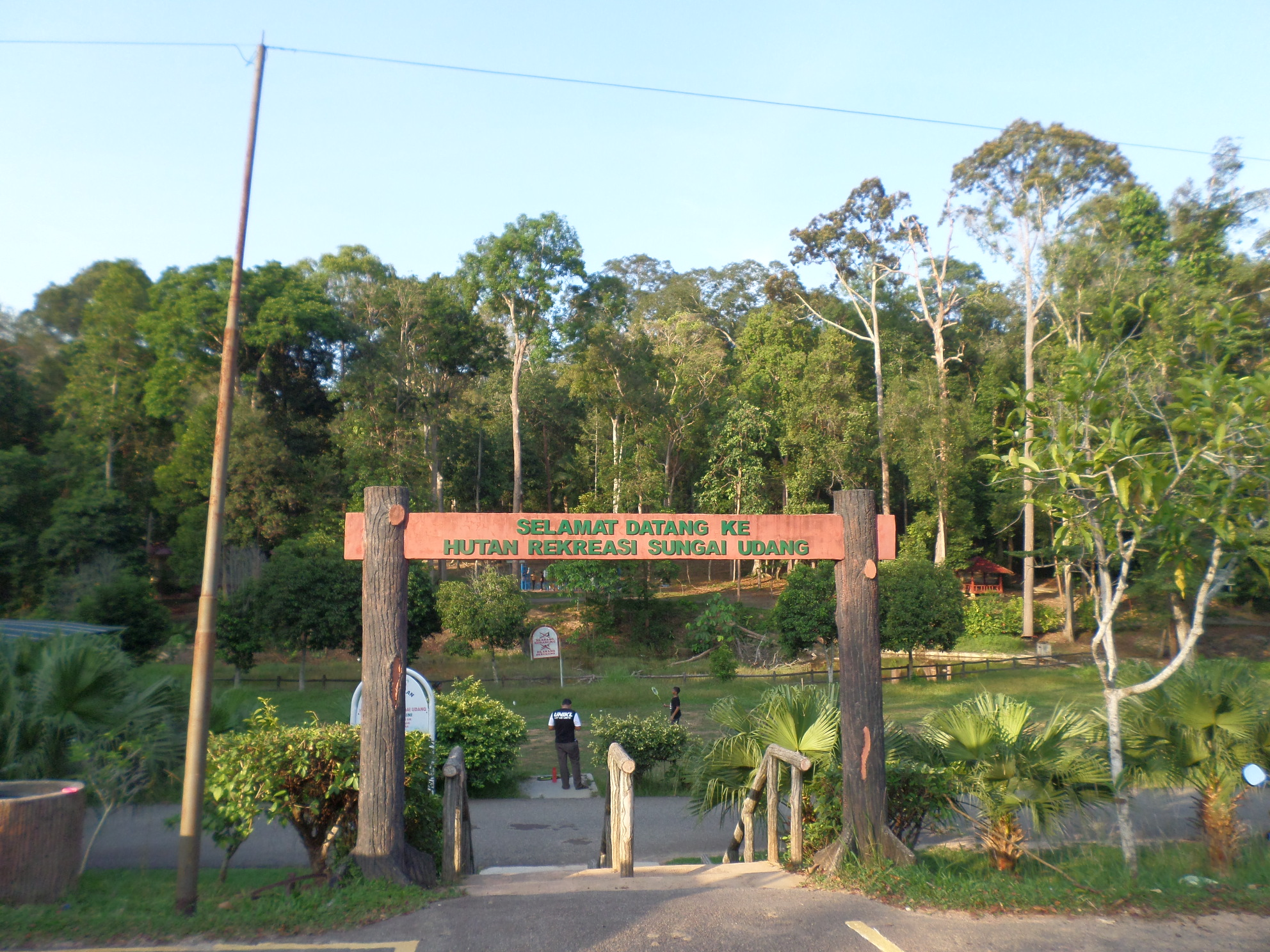
Sungai Udang Recreational Forest

This is the list of tourist attractions in Malacca, Malaysia.

== Community ==
- Chitty Village
- Hang Tuah Village
- Jonker Walk
- Little India
- Morten Village
- Portuguese Settlement

== Convention centres ==
- Malacca International Trade Centre

== Galleries ==
- Upside Down House Gallery Malacca
- Batang Tiga Police Station Gallery
- Casa Cuba
- Demang Abdul Ghani Gallery
- Gallery of Admiral Cheng Ho
- Macau Gallery Malacca
- Malacca Art Gallery
- Melaka Bee Gallery
- Malacca Chief Minister’s Gallery
- Malacca Craft Centre
- Malacca Folks Art Gallery
- Malacca Gallery
- Malacca Golf Gallery
- Malacca House

== Historical buildings ==
- Church of St. Francis Xavier (Melaka)
- Porta de Santiago
- Middelburg Bastion
- Hang Li Poh's Well
- Hang Tuah's Well
- Malacca Light
- Melaka Warrior Monument
- Melaka Sultanate Watermill
- Portuguese Well
- Proclamation of Independence Memorial
- St. Peter's Church (Melaka)
- St. John's Fort
- Ruins of St. Paul's Church
- Stadthuys
- Tun Abdul Ghafar Baba Memorial
- Villa Sentosa

== Libraries ==
- Jonker Street Library
- Malacca Main Public Library
- Malaysia Book Village

== Lighthouses ==
- Cape Rachado Lighthouse
- Pulau Undan Lighthouse

== Mausoleums ==
- Acehnese Headstone
- Alor Gajah British Graveyard
- Datuk Senara Mausoleum
- Dutch Graveyard
- Hang Jebat Mausoleum
- Hang Kasturi Mausoleum
- Hang Tuah Mausoleum
- Sultan Ali of Johor Mausoleum
- Tun Teja Mausoleum

== Museums ==
- Aborigines Museum
- Agricultural Museum
- Baba Nyonya Heritage Museum
- Beauty Museum
- Cheng Ho Cultural Museum
- Chitty Museum
- Democratic Government Museum
- Education Museum
- Governor's Museum
- History and Ethnography Museum
- Kite Museum
- Magic Art 3D Museum
- Malay and Islamic World Museum
- Malaysia Architecture Museum
- Malaysia Prison Museum
- Malaysia Youth Museum
- Maritime Museum
- Melaka Al-Quran Museum
- Melaka Islamic Museum
- Melaka Literature Museum
- Melaka Stamp Museum
- Malacca Sultanate Palace Museum
- Melaka UMNO Museum
- People's Museum
- Royal Malaysian Customs Department Museum
- Royal Malaysian Navy Museum
- Straits Chinese Jewellery Museum
- Submarine Museum
- Toy Museum

== Nature ==
- Asahan Waterfall
- Ayer Keroh Lake
- Batu Lebah Hill
- Besar Island
- Bukit Batu Lebah Recreational Forest
- Bukit Langsat Recreational Forest
- Bukit Serindit Recreational Park
- Chinese Hill
- Tanjung Tuan (Formerly Cape Rachado)
- Datuk Wira Poh Ah Tiam Machap Recreational Park
- Durian Tunggal Reservoir
- Forbidden Garden
- Gadek Hot Spring
- Garden of Thousand Flowers
- Jasin Hot Spring
- Jus Reservoir
- Klebang Beach
- Malacca Botanical Garden
- Malacca Forestry Museum
- Malacca Island
- Malacca River
- Malacca Tropical Fruit Farm
- Merdeka Park
- Paya Laut Linggi Recreational Forest
- Pengkalan Balak Beach
- Puteri Beach
- Selandar Agro Park
- Serompol Tehel Recreational Park
- St. Paul's Hill
- Sungai Udang Recreational Forest
- Tanjung Bidara Beach

== Public squares ==
- 1Malaysia Square, Klebang
- Alor Gajah Square
- Ayer Keroh Square
- Dutch Square
- Jasin Square
- Rambai River Recreational Square

== Religious places ==
=== Buddhist temples ===
- Xiang Lin Si Temple (香林寺)
- Seck Kia Eenh Temple

=== Chinese temples ===
- Cheng Hoon Teng Temple (青云亭)
- Poh San Teng Temple (宝山亭)

=== Churches ===
- Christ Church
- St. Francis Xavier's Church
- St. Peter's Church
- St. Theresa's Church (Melaka)
- Assumption Chapel (Melaka)
- Tamil Methodist Church

=== Hindu temples ===
- Sri Poyatha Moorthi Temple
- Dewi Sri Maha Mariamman (Kutharai Kovil) Temple, Cheng Melaka

=== Mosques ===
- Kampung Hulu Mosque
- Kampung Kling Mosque
- Melaka Chinese Mosque
- Malacca State Mosque
- Malacca Straits Mosque
- Tranquerah Mosque

== Sport centres ==
- Hang Jebat Stadium
- Hang Tuah Stadium
- Malacca International Motorsport Circuit
- Tun Fatimah Stadium, Semabok
- Asahan Saujana NSC Complex

== Science centres ==
- Al-Khawarizmi Astronomy Complex, Masjid Tanah
- Melaka Planetarium

== Shopping centres ==
- ÆON Mall Bandaraya Melaka
- Dataran Pahlawan Melaka Megamall
- Giant Bachang Malacca Mall
- Hang Tuah Mall
- ÆON Malacca Malacca, Ayer Keroh
- KiP Mart Bachang
- Mahkota Parade
- Malacca Mall
- Mydin Mall
- Tesco Malacca
- The Shore Shopping Gallery
- Elements Mall, Hatten City

== Theme parks and resorts ==
- A' Famosa Resort
- Bayou Lagoon Park Resort
- Chin Chin Lake Extreme Park
- Laman Tiga Budaya
- Malaysia Heritage Studios
- Melaka Alive
- Melaka Wonderland, Ayer Keroh
- Pirate Park

== Towers and arches ==
- Ayer Keroh Gateway Arch
- Taming Sari Tower

== Zoos ==
- Malacca Bird Park
- Melaka Butterfly and Reptile Sanctuary
- Melaka Crocodile Farm
- Malacca Zoo
- The Shore Oceanarium
- Turtle Conservation and Information Centre
- Wildlife Theatre Malacca

== Closed attractions ==
- Melaka Batik House Boutique
- Malacca Transportation Museum

== Food ==
- Satay Celup
- Chicken Rice Balls
- Duck Noodles
- Melaka-style Wantan Mee
- Pai Tee (also known as Pie Tee and Top Hats)
- Ayam Pongteh
- Asam Pedas with Fish
- Portuguese Grilled Fish and Seafood
- Fishball Lobak
- Coconut Shake
- Putu Piring
- Peranakan Cuisine: Nyonya Laksa, Nyonya Cendol, Nyonya Kuih
- Chitty Cuisine

== See also ==
- List of tourist attractions in Malaysia
