= Malacca clock tower =

Clock tower in Melaka City, Melaka, Malaysia

Coordinates: 2°11′40″N 102°14′56″E

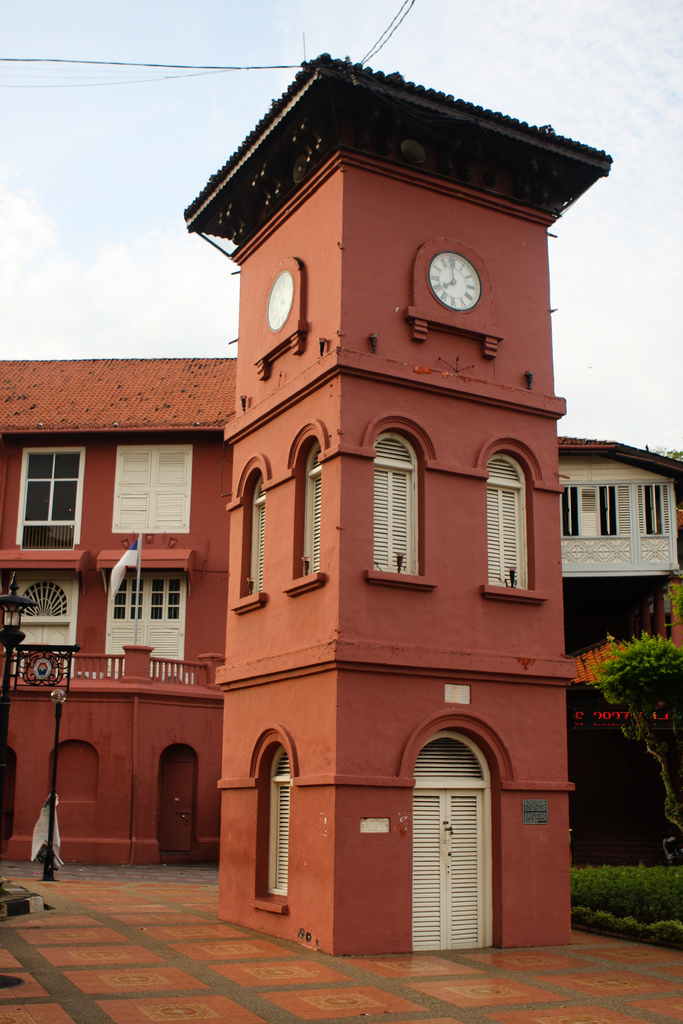
- Interactive map of Malacca clock tower
- Location: Dutch Square, Malacca City, Malaysia

History
- Built: 1886; 140 years ago
- Built for: Tan Beng Swee

Site notes
- Height: 50 feet

The Malacca clock tower is a 19th century clock tower situated in Dutch Square, Malacca City, Malaysia.

== History ==
The clock tower was built in 1886 by Tan Jiak Kim, a wealthy businessman and philanthropist, in memory of his late father Tan Beng Swee who died in 1884. It replaced an earlier clock tower erected in 1873 to house a clock donated by his father. The current clock tower was originally white but was changed to red during the British administration along with the other colonial buildings in the square including the Stadthuys and Christ Church.

The clock tower is 50 feet high with a four-face clock with Roman numerals. For almost a century, it is said, the original clock never stopped until it was replaced in 1982.
