= History and Ethnography Museum =

Museum in Melaka Tengah, Malacca, Malaysia

- Muzium Sejarah dan Ethnografi
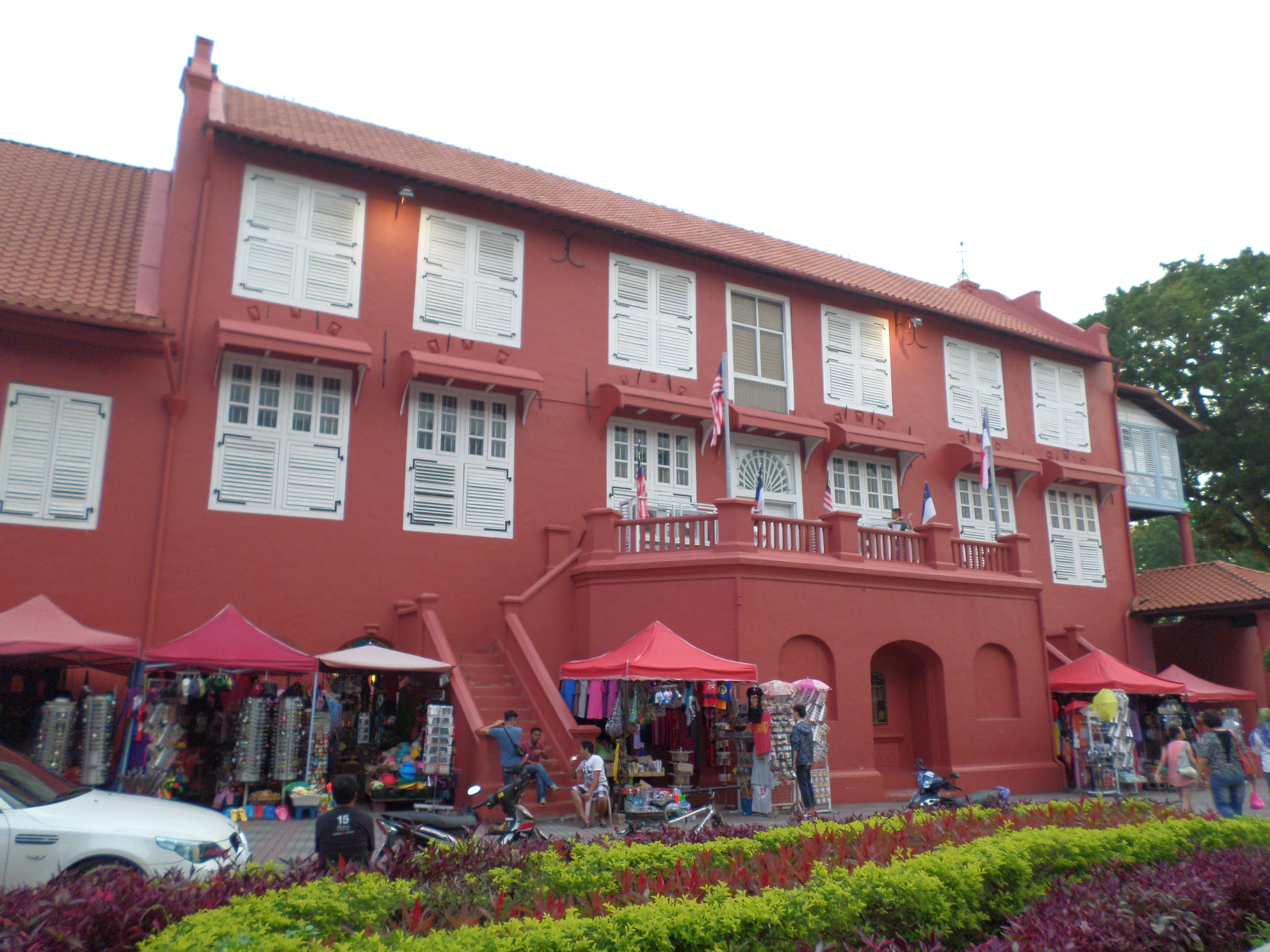
- Location: Malacca City, Malacca, Malaysia
- Coordinates: 2°11′38.6″N 102°14′56.3″E
- Type: museum

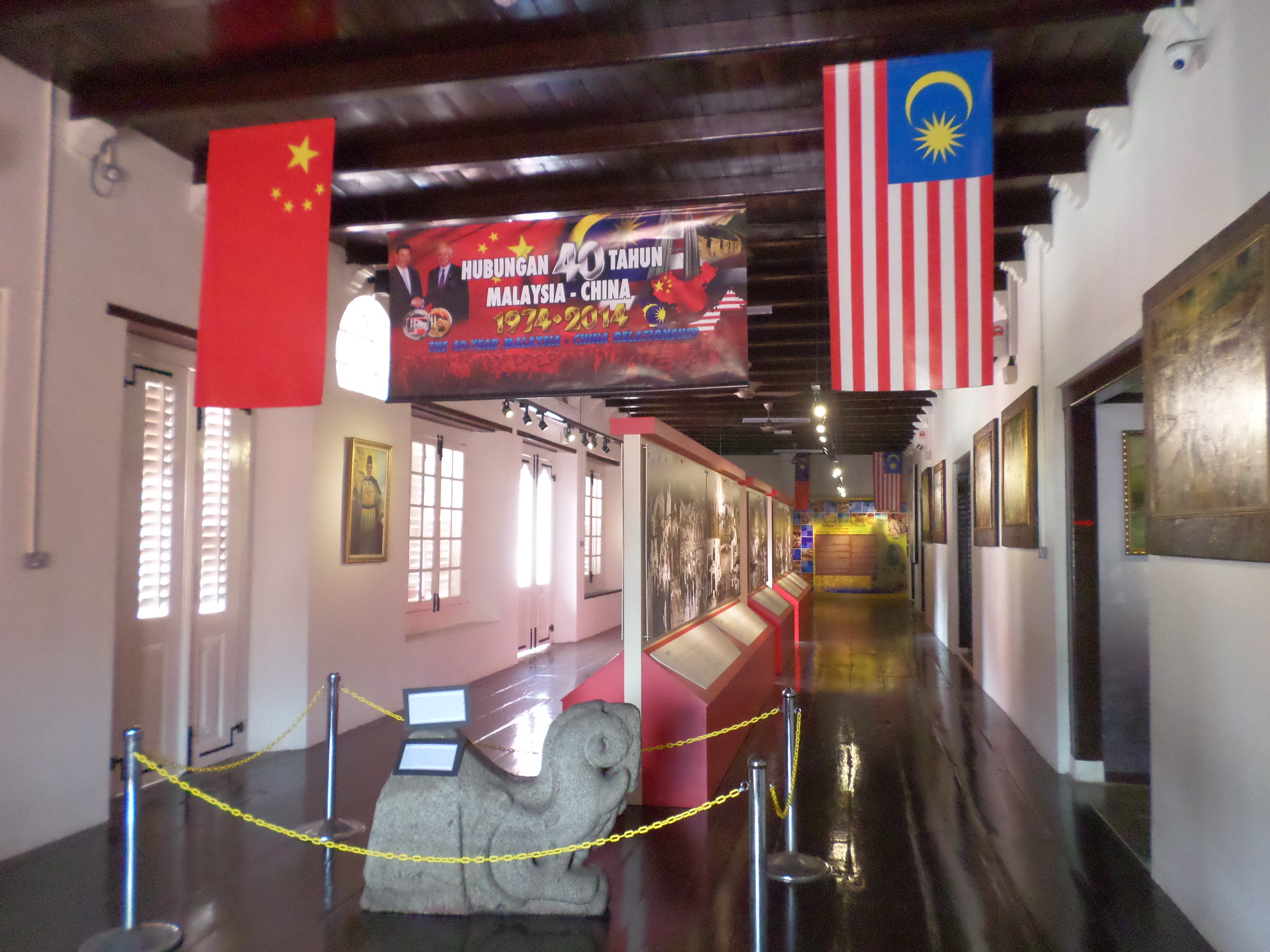
History and Ethnography Museum exhibition hall

The History and Ethnography Museum (Malay: Muzium Sejarah dan Ethnografi) is a museum in Malacca City, Malacca, Malaysia. It is located inside the Stadthuys building, built during the Dutch Malacca administration period in 1650. The historical section of the museum displays the history of Malacca from its establishment in 1400 until 1957, the year Malaya gained independence, while the ethnography section of the museum portrays the lifestyle and culture of various communities and sub-communities of Malacca including the Malays, the Chinese, the Indians, the Portuguese, the Baba and Nyonya, the Chetti and Chitty communities. Other exhibits include items used in traditional wedding ceremonies, kitchen utensils, musical instruments and collections of ancient porcelain ware, weapons, stamps and ancient currencies.

== See also ==
- List of museums in Malaysia
- List of tourist attractions in Malacca
