= Dutch brick =

Yellow brick

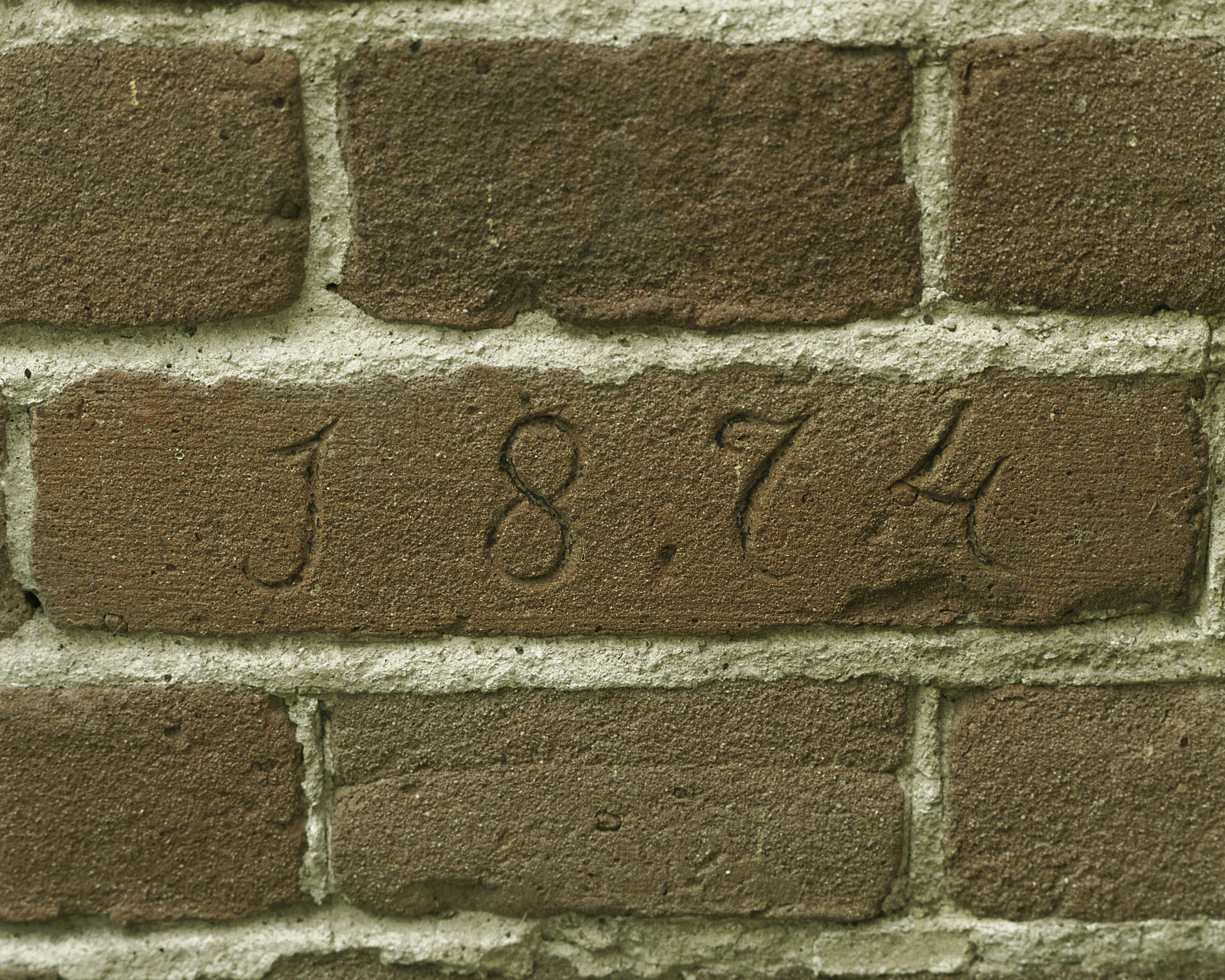
Close-up of Dutch bricks with inscription

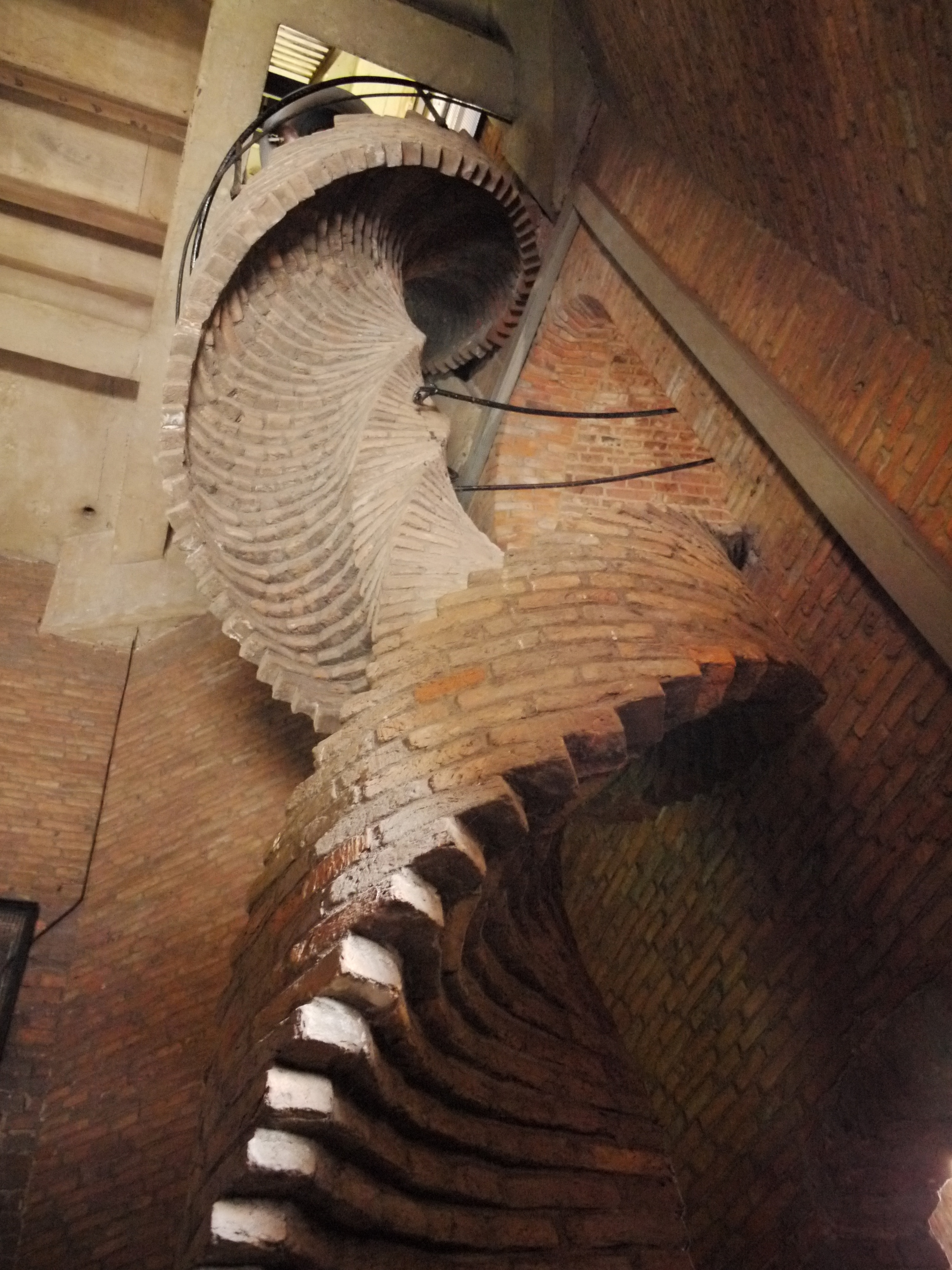
Spiral staircase to the carillon of the Dutch Reformed Church of IJsselstein

Dutch brick (Dutch: IJsselsteen) is a small type of red brick made in the Netherlands, or similar brick, and an architectural style of building with brick developed by the Dutch. The brick, made from clay dug from river banks or dredged from river beds of the river IJssel and fired over a long period of time, was known for its durability and appearance.

Traditional Dutch brick architecture is characterized by rounded or stepped gables. The bricks were imported as ballast into Great Britain and the colonies in the east of America. Trinity College, Dublin, Ireland, founded in 1591, was originally built of red Dutch brick. Dutch brickmakers emigrated to New Netherland in America, where they built kilns for firing bricks locally. Bricks were being burned in New Amsterdam (New York) by 1628, but the imported bricks were of better quality. At first the bricks were used only for chimneys, but they were later used to face the lower story of the house, and then the entire house. Most of the surviving "Dutch Colonial" houses in New York do not in fact follow Dutch architectural practices, but there are several examples in Albany County which do.

Bricks were also exported by the Dutch for major buildings in their colonies in the east and around the world. The Castle of Good Hope in Cape Town, South Africa, was built in 1666, and its entrance was made of the small yellow bricks called ijselstene (IJssel stones). Christ Church in Malacca, Malaysia, the oldest Dutch church building outside the Netherlands, was made of Dutch bricks that had been brought as ballast in ships from the Netherlands, coated with Chinese plaster.

== Background and manufacture ==
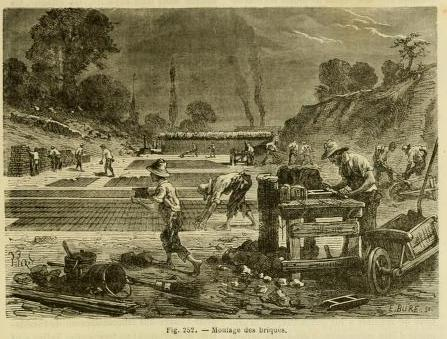
Manual brick manufacture. Illustration from Louis Figuier, Les merveilles de l'industrie (1879).

The word "brick" may be of Dutch origin. A 1901 dictionary of architecture defines "brick" as "a regularly shaped piece of clay hardened in the sun or by the heat of a kiln and intended for building; commonly one of very many pieces of uniform size". The "Dutch Brick" is described as "a hard, light-coloured brick originally made in Holland [sic] and used in England for pavements; hence a similar brick made in England".

Until well into the twentieth century the manufacture of brick in the Netherlands (and elsewhere) used manual labour mostly, and the low-paid workers involved in the industry were as marginal socially as the manufacturing industry geographically—the raw materials were gathered on river banks, and the firing of the bricks took place well away from towns and farms to lessen any nuisance caused by fire and smoke. Workers, as was noted in municipal reports, often already belonged to the lower levels of society and were frequently simply let go at the end of the season, adding to the municipal burdens: "As the number of brick kilns increases, so does poverty", according to the 1873 report of the Ubbergen municipality, near Nijmegen, on the Waal river.

The clay for the bricks was dug from river banks (of the Waal, Rhine, and IJssel rivers) and other open-air locations, and was left outside (in a mound called the kleibult) through the winter so that any organic material could decay; the weather (rain, frost, drought) helped make the clay more manageable. At the end of this period the clay was mixed with sand and other materials, a process done by foot, by workers stomping on the clay. It was then molded into the proper shape by an artisan, the tichelaar ("brickmaker"). Children handed the brickmaker the raw material and removed the shaped bricks. Child labour was common in the industry: until well into the nineteenth century children eight years old and younger worked 16 hours per day, and children four years old stacked and carried bricks for hours at a stretch. Molds were moistened with water and strewn with sand to enable the shaped brick to be more easily removed. The "raw" or "green" stones were laid out in long rows to dry and when they were dry enough they were stood up on their side so the bottom could dry; this work was often done by women and children. Often it was the women who did the much heavier labour of moving the dried bricks to the ovens, hauling wheelbarrows with loads of up to 80 kilogrammes, and stacking and preparing the ovens and tending to the fire (which burned peat or coal). Ovens came in two types—a single-use construction of the kind used in the production of charcoal, and a more permanent type, basically consisting of two walls one metre and a half thick. Ovens could hold up to a million bricks. Masonry bricks were fired between 900 °C (1,650 °F) and 1,125 °C (2,057 °F), klinkers between 1,150 °C (2,100 °F) and 1,250 °C (2,280 °F). Typically, bricks were baked at low heat for two weeks to remove all remaining moisture from the clay, and then for four weeks at a higher temperature, followed by two weeks of cooling down.

Since the klinker was partially vitrified by being fired at a higher temperature it was harder than the standard. Klinkers were imported into England for use as paving.

Small, yellow Dutch bricks used to be imported into the United States, and as of 1840 there were still old buildings in New York faced in these bricks. They were considered superior in appearance and in durability. An 1888 report noted that "in New York and other Atlantic cities we find houses built of brick brought from Holland [sic] fully two hundred years ago, without a flaw or sign of decay, and apparently as firm and sound as when first laid in the wall".

== Europe ==
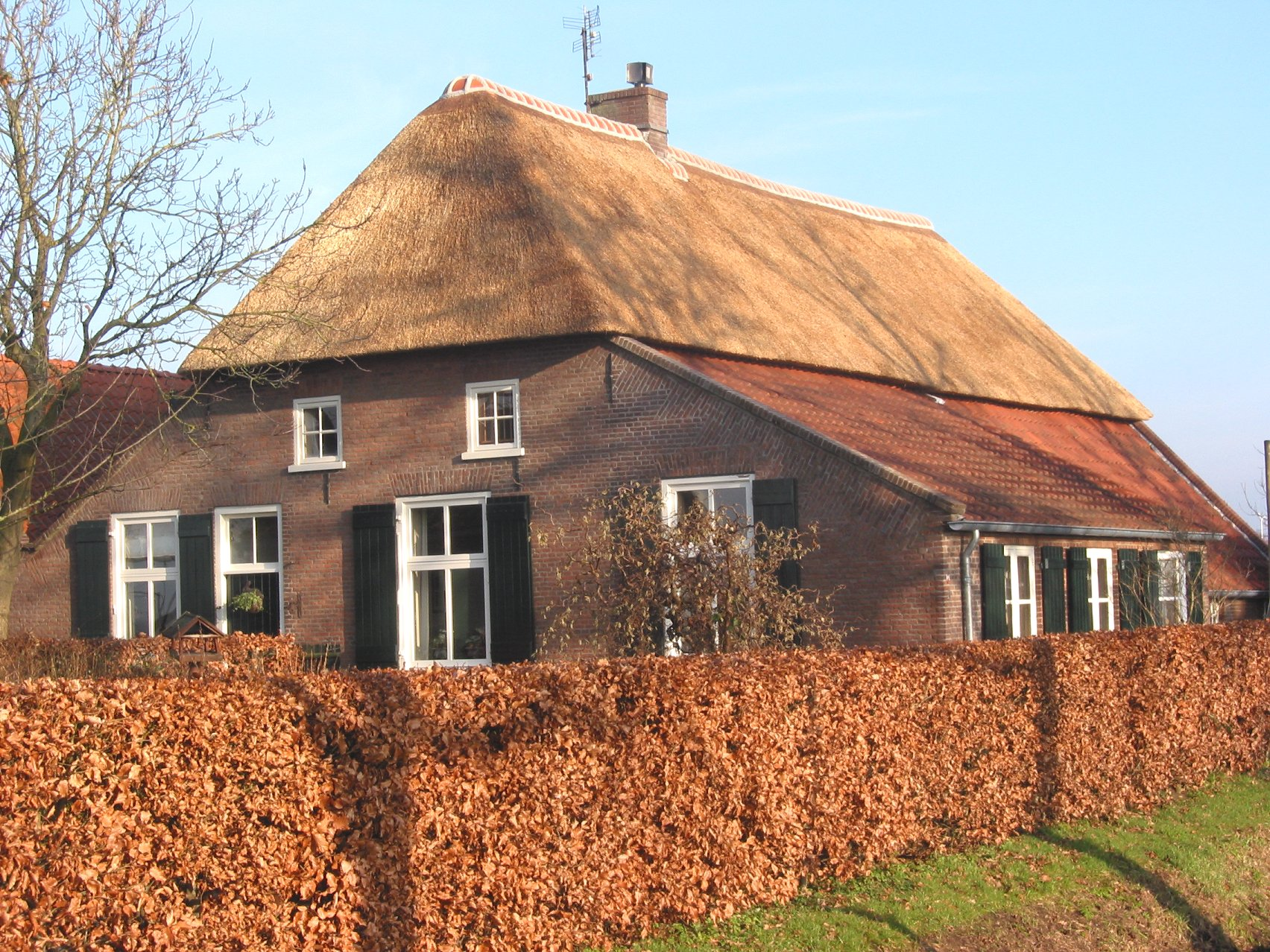
Old Dutch farmhouse with thatched roof

Houses found today in Zeeland are closer in appearance to the fine Dutch brick houses of New York than are houses from other parts of the Netherlands. Brick farm houses built separately from barns are found in Zeeland, but none have survived in other locations. Unlike the common practice in New York, the farm houses in Zeeland do not have separate outside doors for each room. The Dutch also used bricks to pave the roads, or chaussees, in the Netherlands.

By the 1640s the Dutch were considered to be the leaders in Europe both in making bricks and in bricklaying. The Summer Garden in Saint Petersburg, Russia, exhibits the work of Dutch brickmakers and bricklayers. Saint Michael's Castle, built in Saint Petersburg between 1797 and 1801 for the Emperor Paul I, is "an enormous quadrangular pile, of red Dutch brisk, rising from a massy basement of hewn granite". Sans Souci, the palace built for Frederick the Great in Potsdam, was built with a facade of rich red Dutch brick.

In recent years the Dutch brick industry has attracted unwelcome attention from the European Union (EU) competition authorities. In the early 1990s the industry had excess capacity due to technological advances, competition from other materials and an economic slowdown. Producers with combined market share of 90% agreed to reduce capacity, shutting down the older and inefficient plants. The producers compensated those who closed plants. However, the agreement also included fixing production quotas and fining members who produced more than their quota. The members of what was in effect a cartel were forced to drop the quota agreement by the EU.

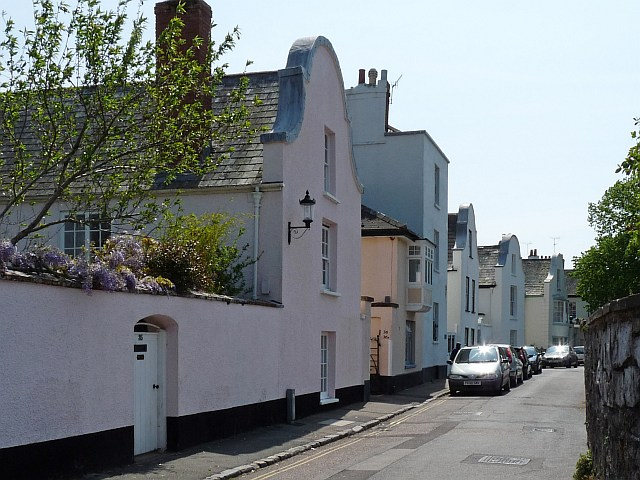
"Dutch Houses", Topsham, Devon, England

=== Great Britain and Ireland ===
Imported Dutch brick was often used in buildings in England in the 17th and 18th centuries. In Dartmouth, a house built in 1664 for mariner Robert Plumleigh had traditional timber-framed architecture but included elaborate star-shaped chimney stacks made from imported Dutch brick. Houses in Topsham, Devon, also used Dutch brick for chimneys, window heads and dressing. One house from the late 17th century in Dutch Court in Topsham is built entirely of Dutch brick. The ports of Exeter and Topsham both shipped wool to the Netherlands, and the returning ships brought bricks as ballast from Amsterdam or Rotterdam.

Trinity College, Dublin, Ireland, founded in 1591, was originally built of red Dutch brick. Jigginstown House in Naas, County Kildare, Ireland, was built by John Allen for Thomas Wentworth, 1st Earl of Strafford (1593–1641) using Dutch brick "of the most superior manufacture". The Red House in Youghal, Ireland, was built of red Dutch brick in 1710 by the Dutch architect Leuventhal for the Uniacke family.

== United States ==
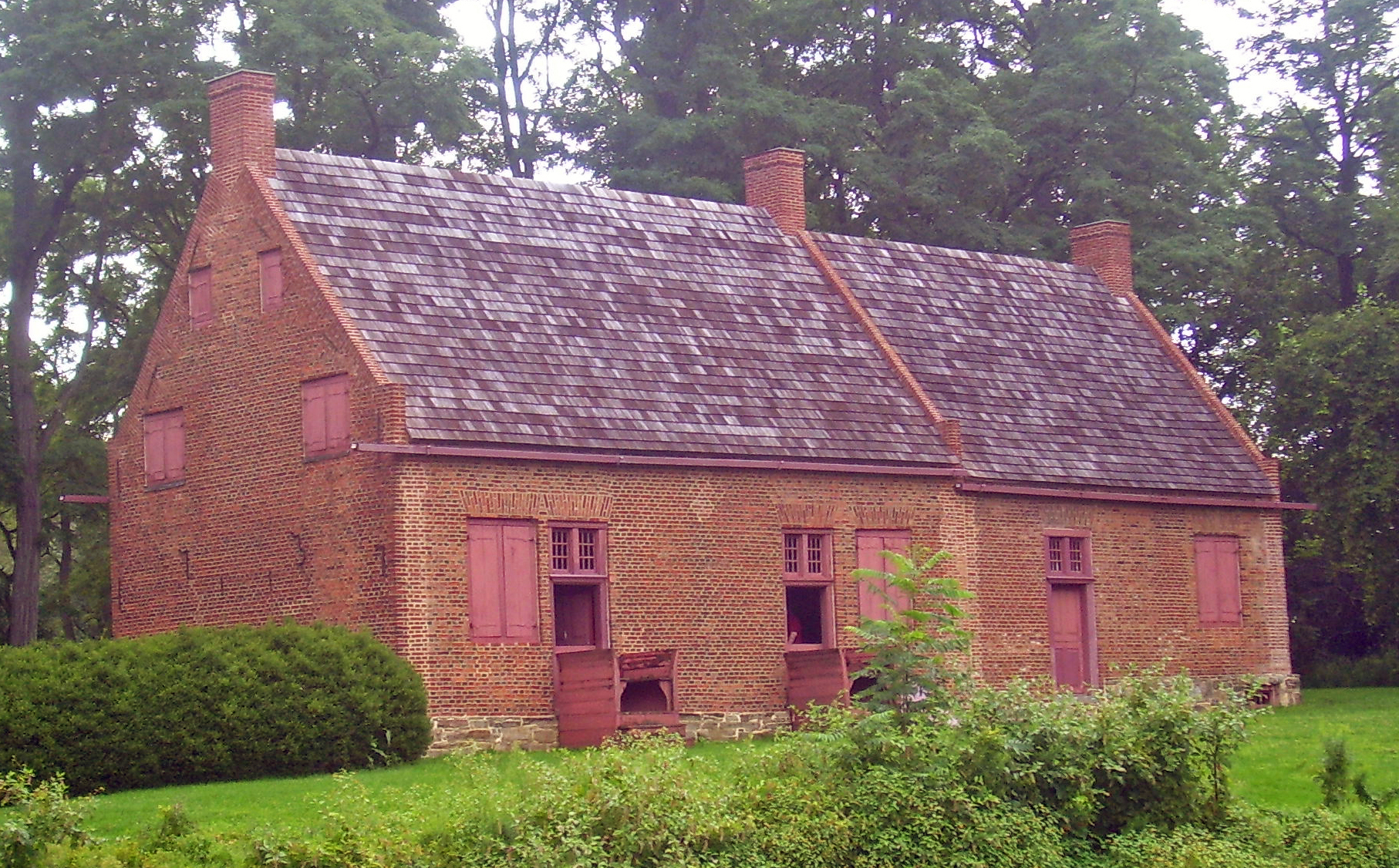
Van Alen House, Kinderhook, New York, built around 1737

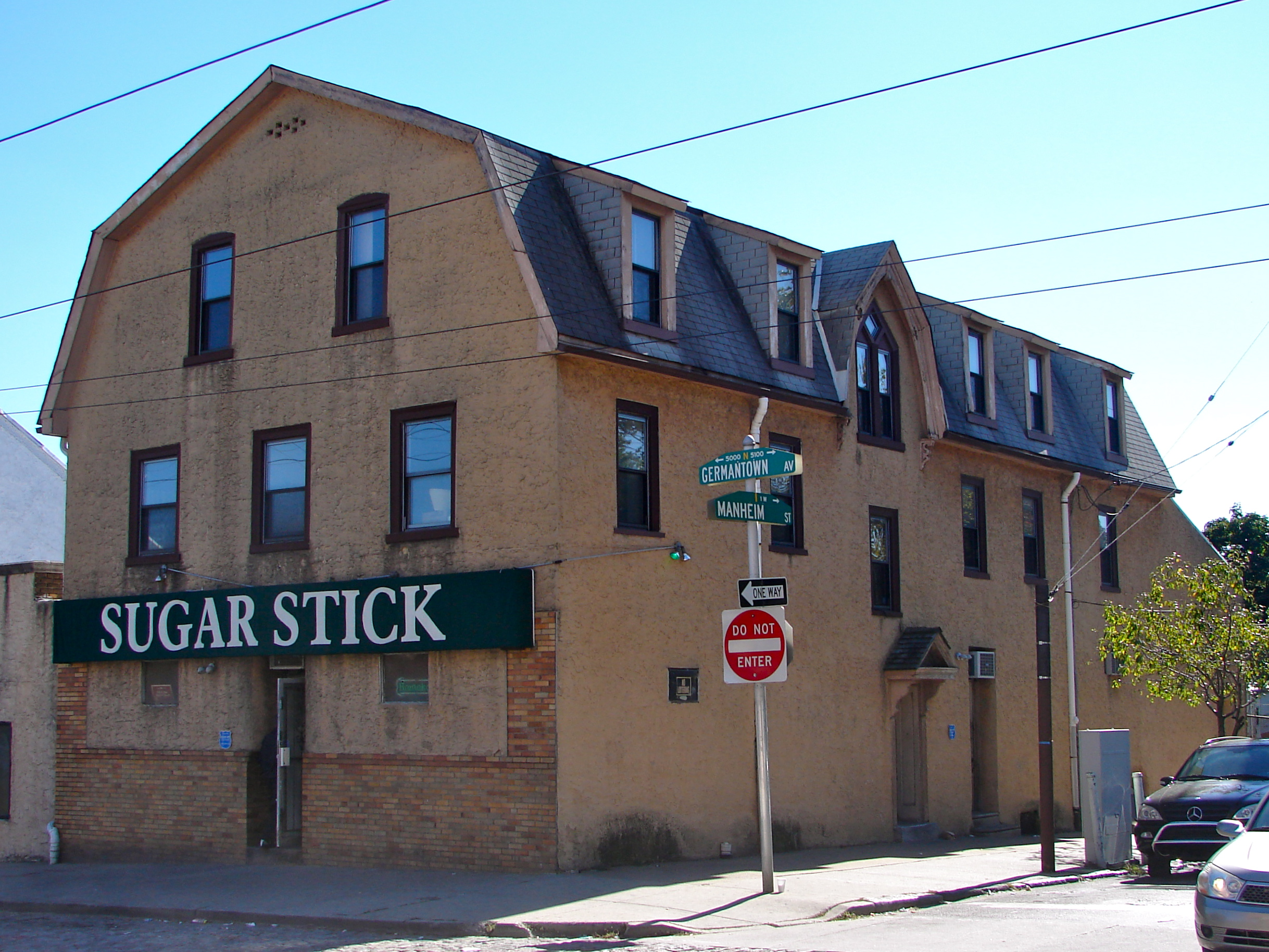
General Wayne Hotel, Philadelphia, USA, c. 1803, gambrel roof added and enlarged 1866. Dutch Colonial style

In general, bricks were not imported to the American colonies. Probably none were imported to Virginia and Maryland, but in New England there was one possible example in New Haven, and there are records documenting the shipment of 10,000 bricks to Massachusetts Bay in 1628 and several thousand bricks being shipped to New Sweden. It is possible that the terms "Dutch brick" and "English brick" referred to the size of the locally made bricks, with the Dutch bricks being the smaller. However, in New Netherland there are records of brick being imported from the Netherlands as ballast in 1633, and of continued shipments until the American Revolution (1765–1783). Bricks were being fired in New Amsterdam (New York) by 1628, but the imported bricks were of better quality. At first, the bricks were used only for chimneys, but they were later used to face the lower story of the house, and then the entire house.

Dutch brickmakers emigrated to New Netherland, where they built kilns for firing bricks locally. In New Amsterdam, brick was used for the director general's house, the counting house, the city tavern and other important buildings. Houses were gable-ended, often with stepped designs, and the bricks ranged in colour from yellow or red to blue or black. An account of New York published in 1685 said, "The town is broad, built with Dutch brick, consisting of above five hundred houses, the meanest not valued under an hundred pounds". A New Englander who visited New York in 1704, forty years after the Dutch had yielded the town to the British, admired the appearance of the glazed brickwork of the houses of "diverse coullers and laid in Checkers". In 1845 there was still a one-story Dutch brick house built in 1696 in Flatbush, Brooklyn. The date and the owner's initials were formed by blue and red glazed bricks.

A view of part of Albany, New York, as it was in 1814 shows a mixture of Dutch, English and Federal styles, although Dutch brick was reportedly used for one of the English-style houses. One house in the Dutch style was said to date from the American Revolution. If so, it would have been one of the last genuine Dutch-style houses to be built in the United States, reflecting the conservative Dutch culture of Albany at that time.

Most of the surviving "Dutch Colonial" houses in New York do not in fact follow Dutch architectural practices, but there are seven in Albany County that do. The houses have a wood frame with brick walls as a decorative shell. They each have two parapet gables edged with "mouse toothing" ornamental brickwork. All the Dutch brick buildings used iron wall anchors spread across several bricks to tie the brick shell to the wooden frame of the house. Sometimes the anchor gives the date of construction. The brickwork of the houses incorporated various designs including spear shapes and a form like a fleur-de-lis.

== Other Dutch colonies ==
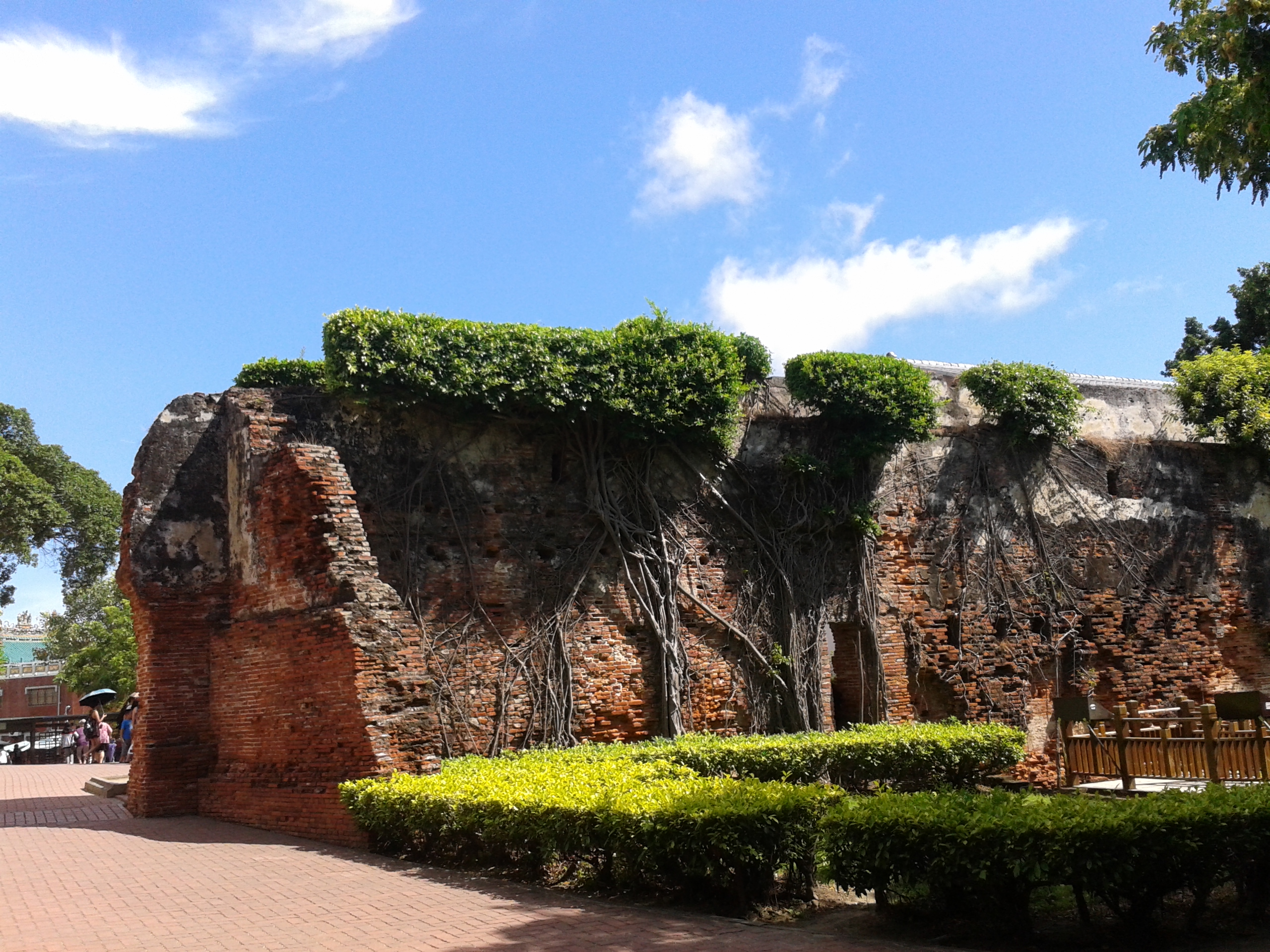
Fort Zeelandia (Taiwan). Original wall of imported red bricks laid by the soldiers of the Dutch East India Company.

Dutch bricks and brickwork were also imported and utilized in other colonies throughout the Dutch Empire in Asia, Africa, and the Caribbean. Fort Zeelandia was built on a small island off Tainan in Formosa (Taiwan) between 1624 and 1634 after the Dutch acquired Formosa from China as a trading colony. It was built using bricks from Batavia (Jakarta), where the Dutch East India Company had its headquarters. After a siege in 1662, the Dutch surrendered the fort to Koxinga, a Ming dynasty general. The fort was destroyed by an explosion in 1873 when a shell from a British warship blew up the ammunition storehouse. The masonry was later used for other purposes. All that remains is part of the southern wall.

The Castle of Good Hope in Cape Town, South Africa, was built in 1666. The gateway was built in 1682, with a pediment and two pilasters of grey-blue stone, and an entrance made of the small yellow bricks called ijseltene (IJssel stones).

Christ Church, Malacca, Malaysia, is the oldest Dutch church building outside the Netherlands. It was built by the local Dutch burghers after the town had been taken from the Portuguese, and was completed in 1753. The church covers 25 by 12 metres (82 by 41 ft), with a ceiling 12 metres (40 ft) high. The foundations were local laterite blocks. The walls, which are massive, were made of Dutch bricks that had been brought as ballast in ships from the Netherlands, and they were coated with Chinese plaster.

On the island of Sint Eustatius in the Netherlands Antilles, the houses were built from local volcanic stone, from imported wood, or from red or yellow Dutch brick imported from the Netherlands. The traditional masonry houses were both large and solid. The country house of Johannes de Graaff, who commanded Sint Eustatius from 1776 to 1781, features a 10.2-by-3.0-metre (33.6 by 9.7 ft) duck pond made of brick.

== Gallery ==
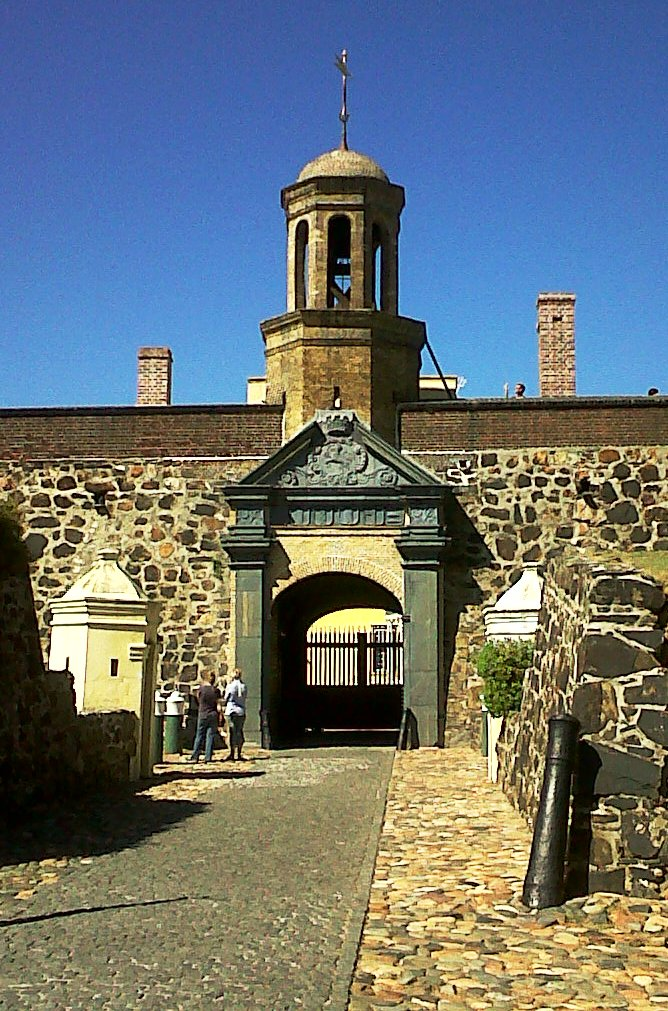
Castle of Good Hope with small yellow ijselstene bricks

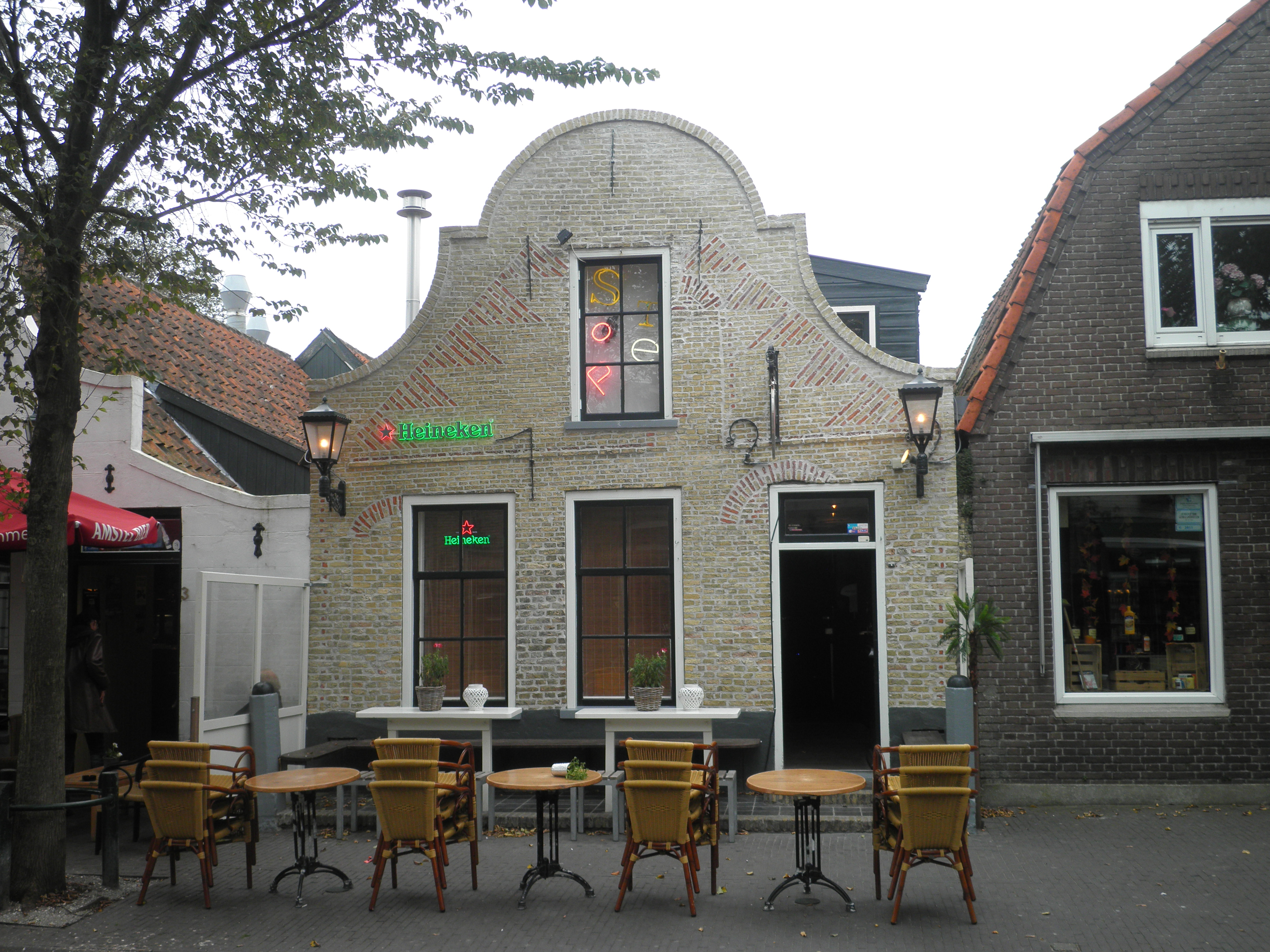
Small gable-to-gable building in yellow brick with red-stone detailing, dated 1722, on the island of Terschelling, Netherlands

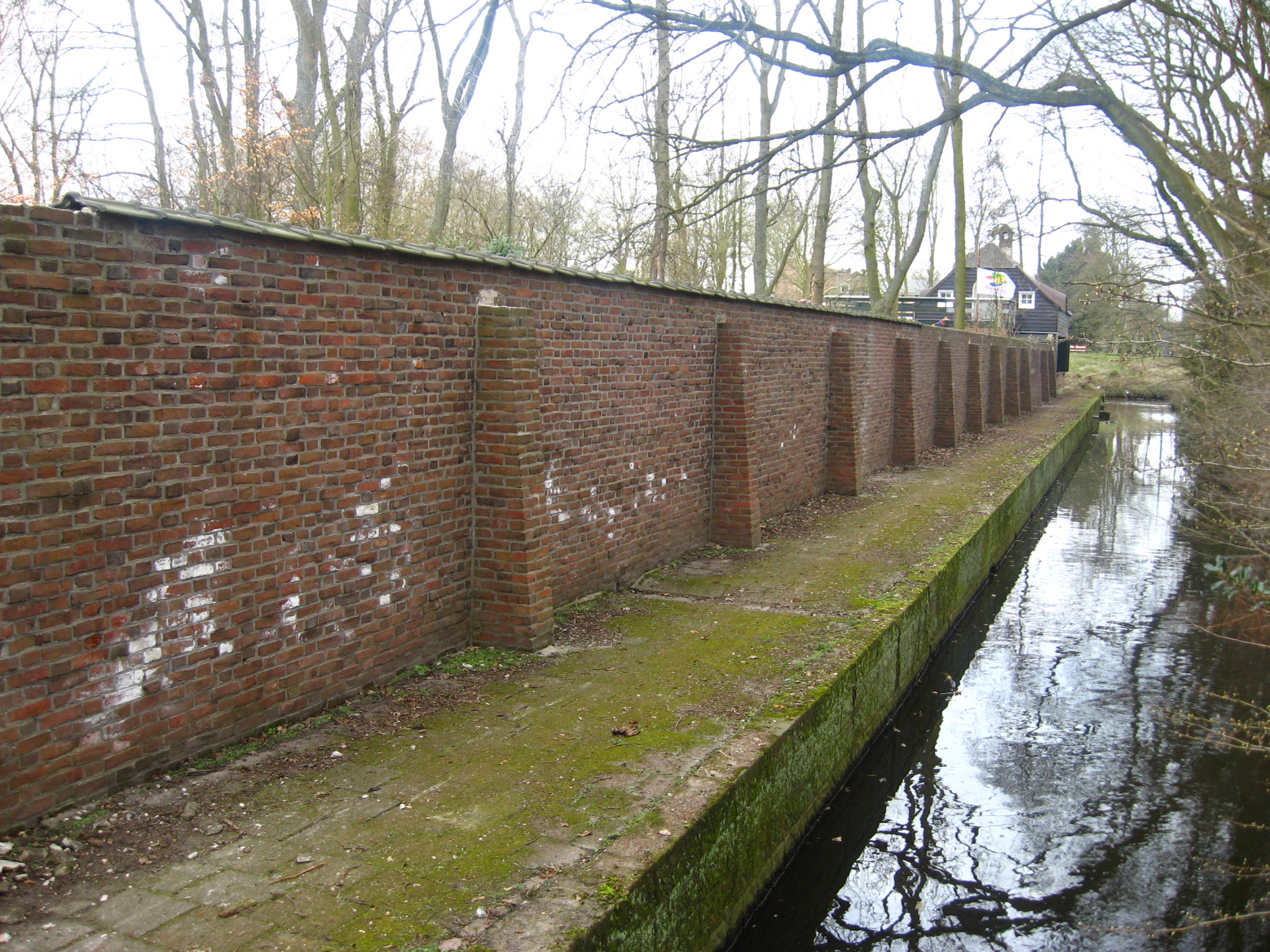
Brick wall, paving and canal wall in Wassenaar, Netherlands

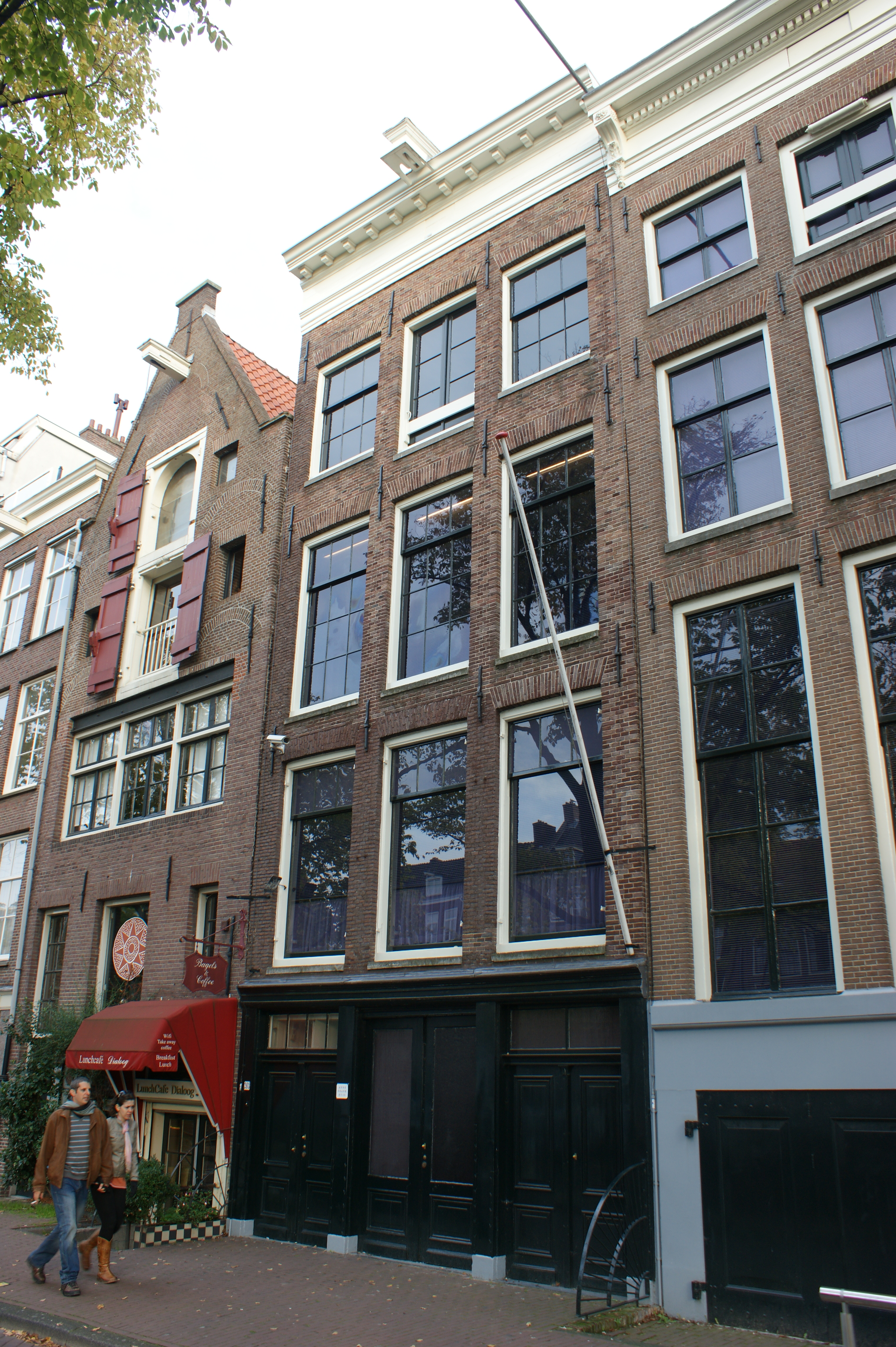
Anne Frank House and neighbouring canal houses in Amsterdam

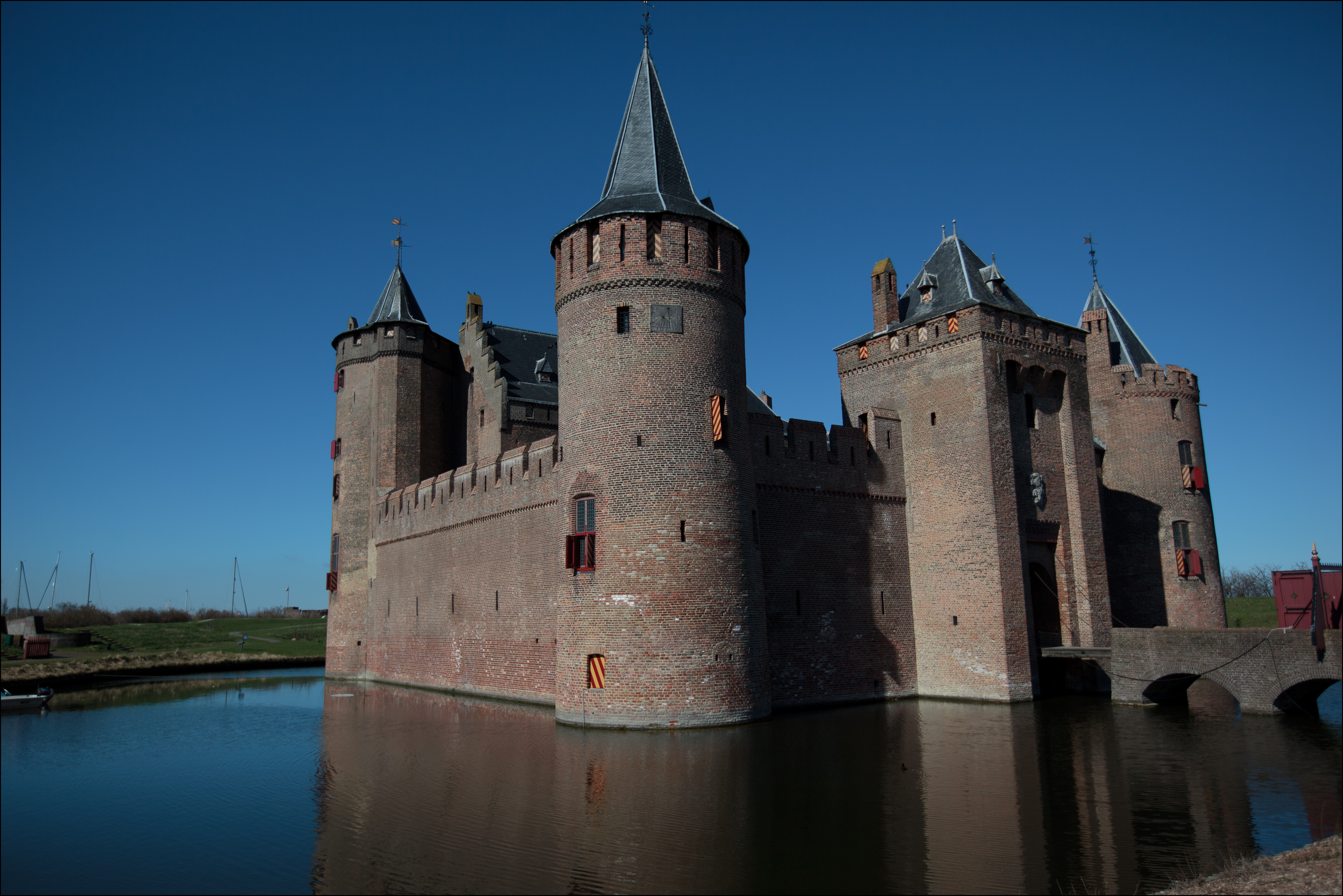
The Muiderslot castle in Muiden, Netherlands

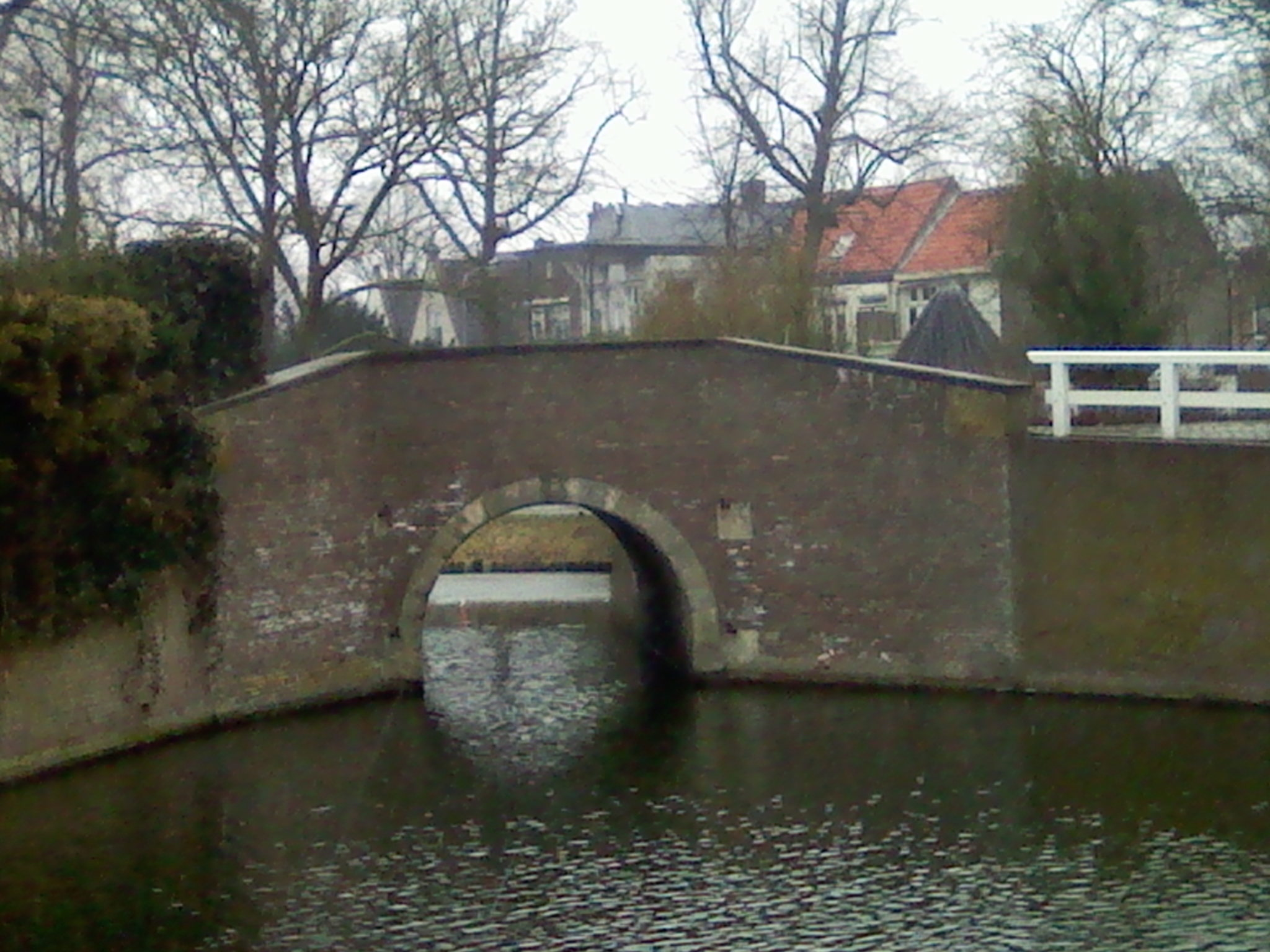
The Waterpoortbrug (Water Gate Bridge) in Hoorn, Netherlands, a brick bridge

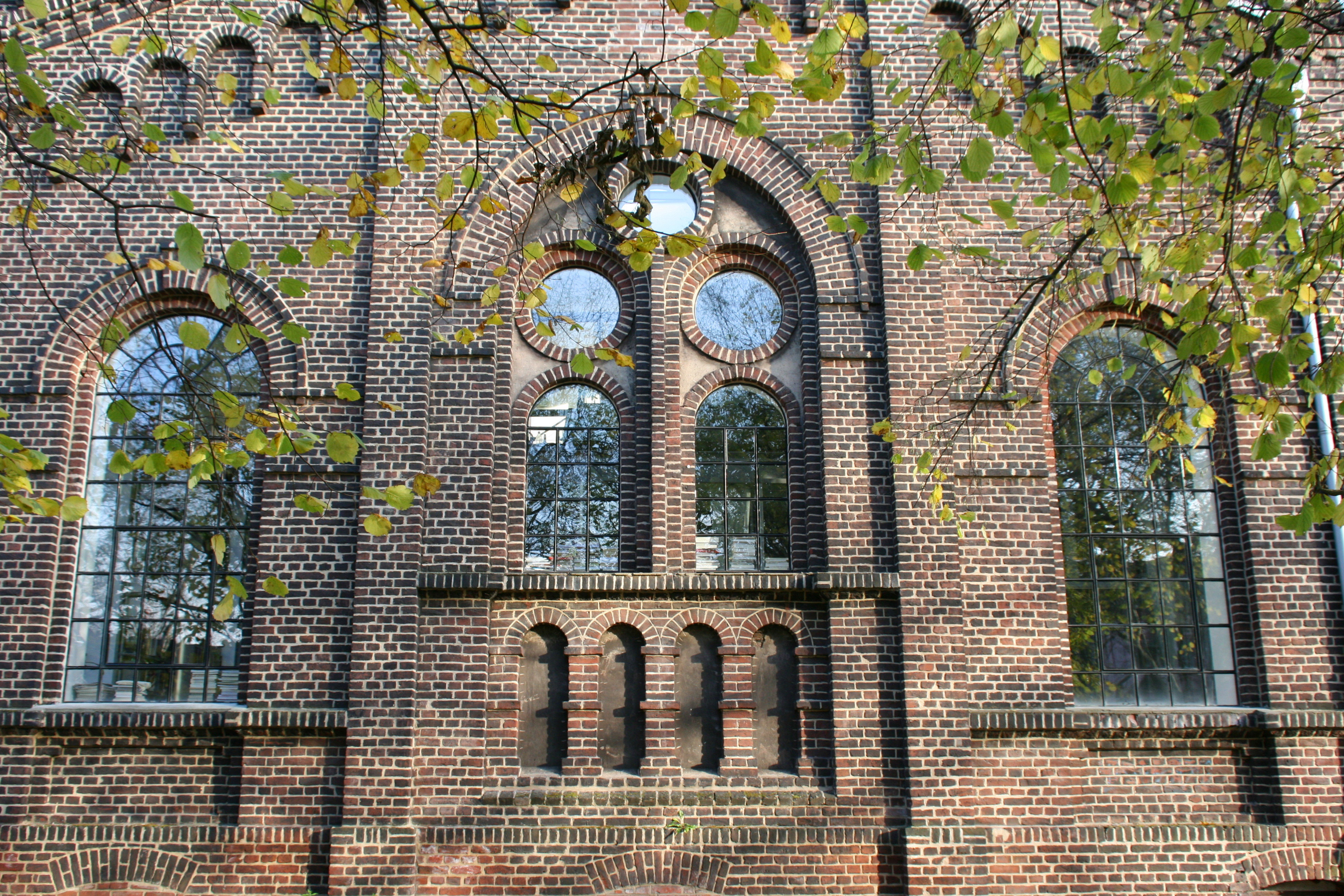
Machine house of the Zeche Holland in Gelsenkirchen-Ückendorf

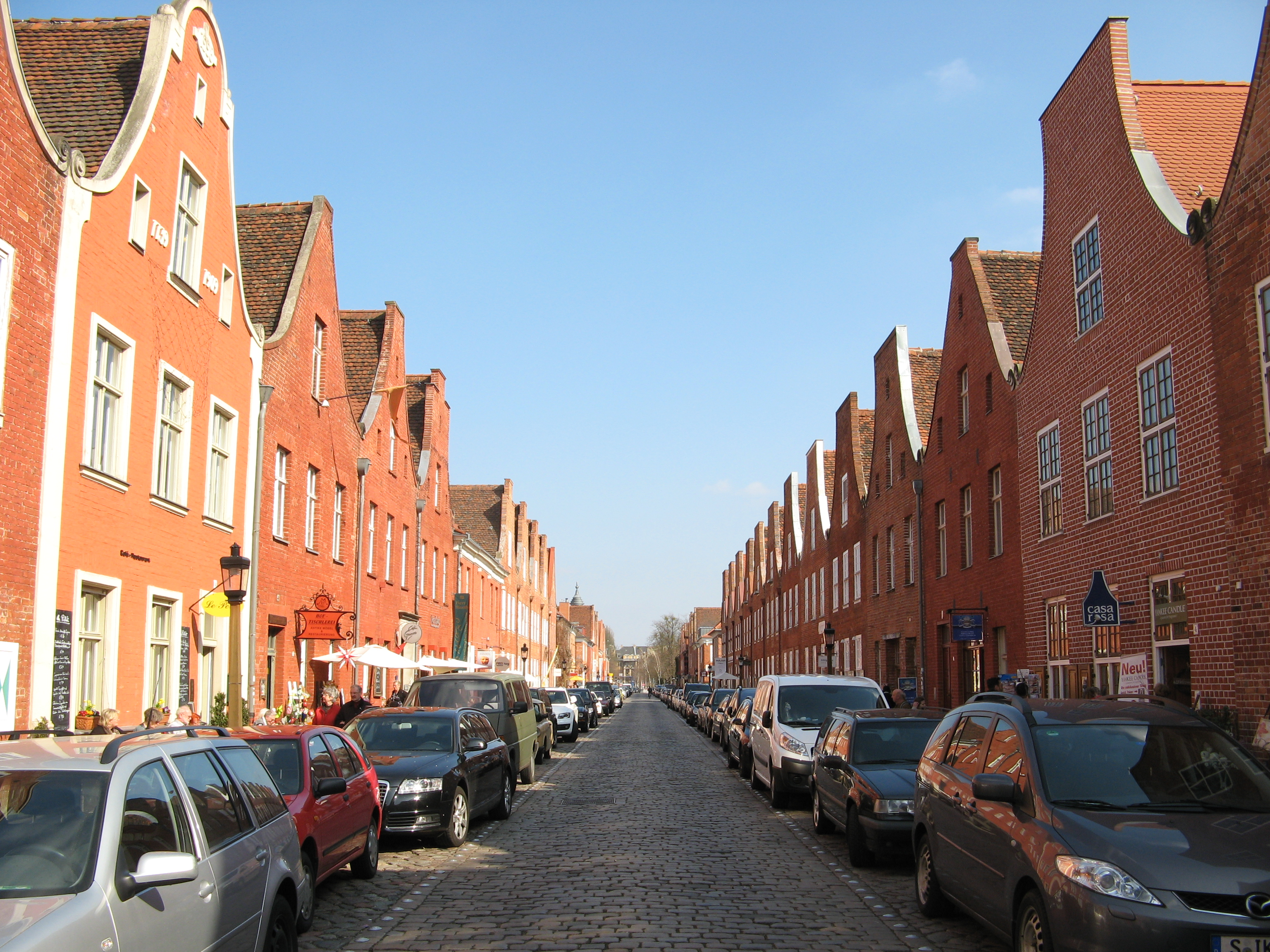
Dutch Quarter in Potsdam, Germany

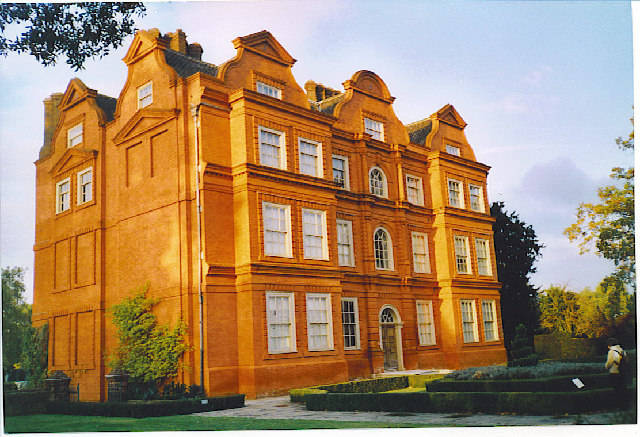
Kew Palace, London, England. A red brick building with distinctive Dutch architecture, built in 1631

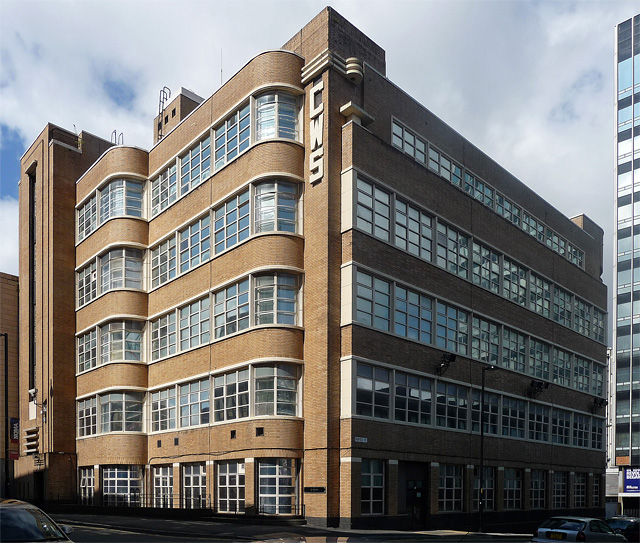
Redfern Building in Manchester, England, in Dutch brick modernist style

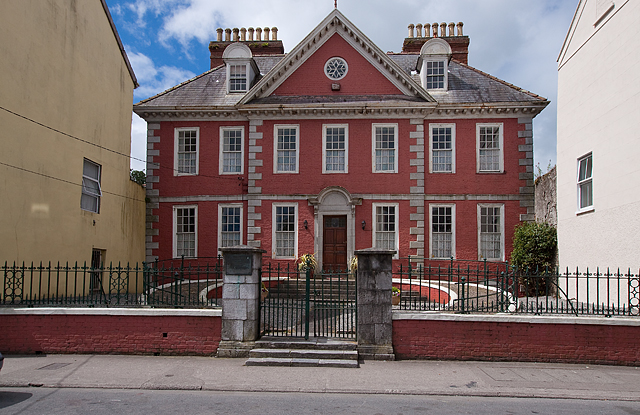
The Red House in Youghal, Ireland. Baroque William and Mary style

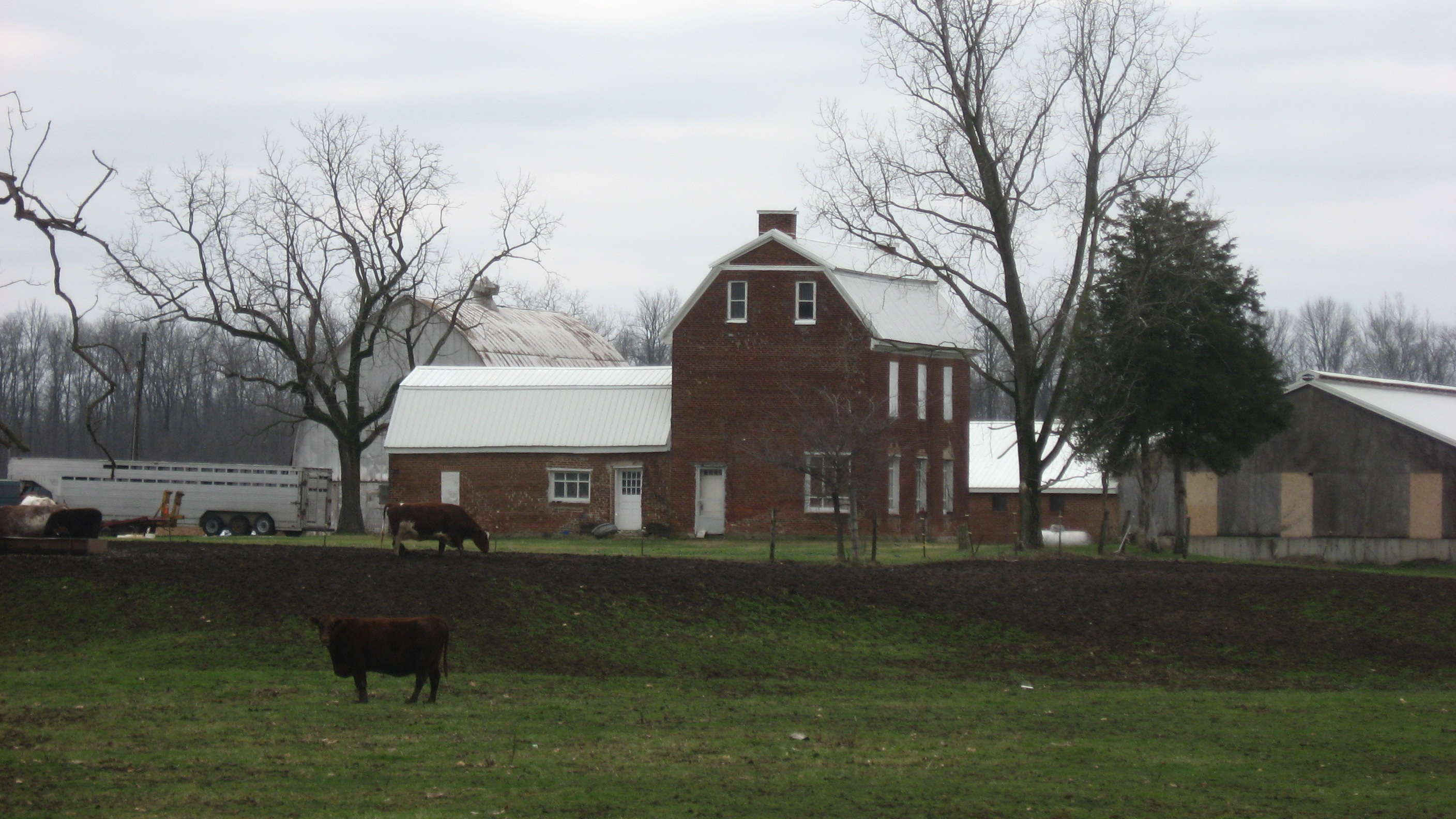
Wilson-Lenox House in Shelby County, Ohio, USA. Built in 1816, an example of the Dutch colonial architecture style

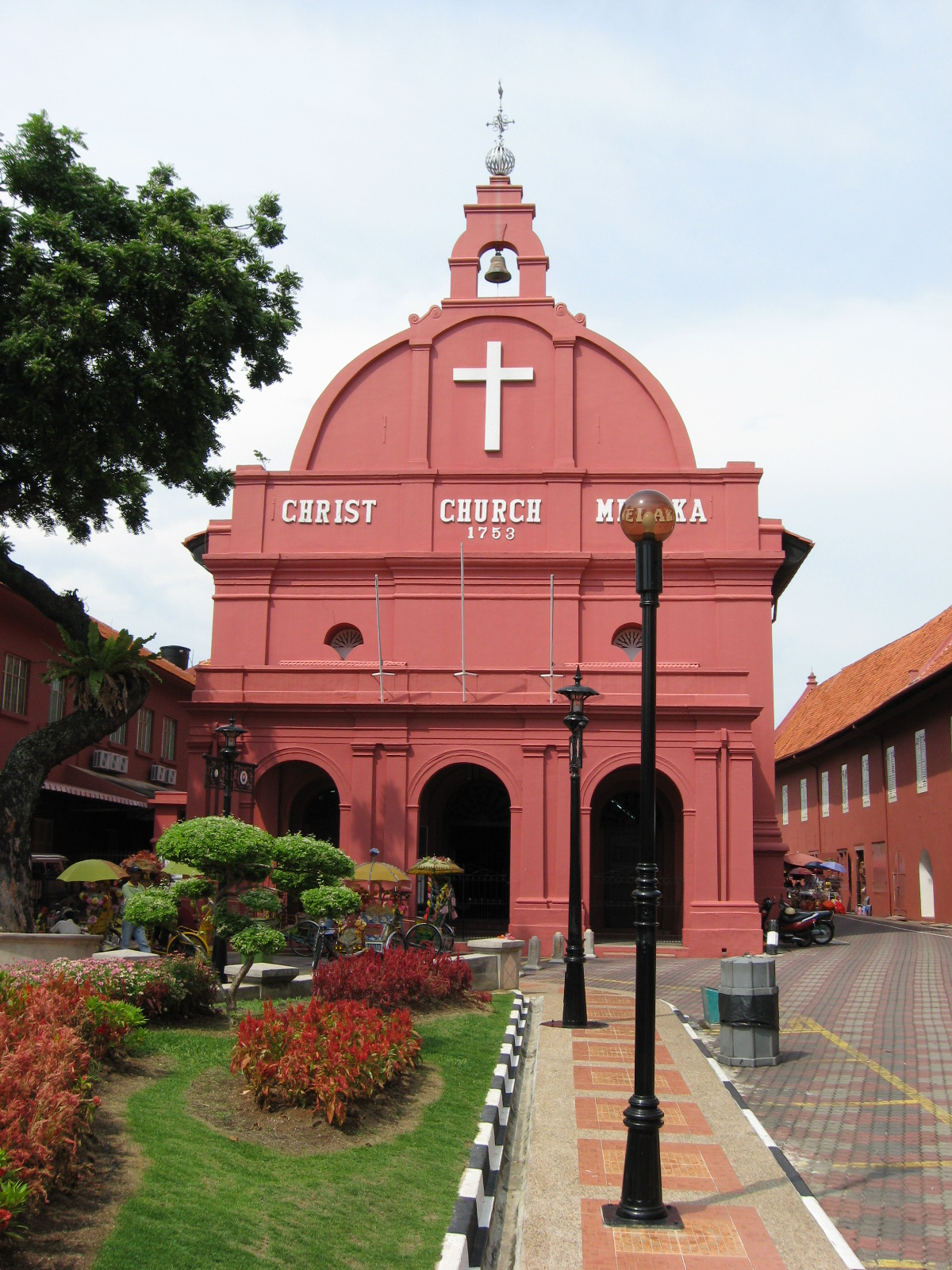
Christ Church, Malacca, built in the 18th century with bricks imported from Zeeland, Netherlands

== See also ==
- Brick Gothic
