= Stadthuys =

Building in Malacca City, Malacca, Malaysia

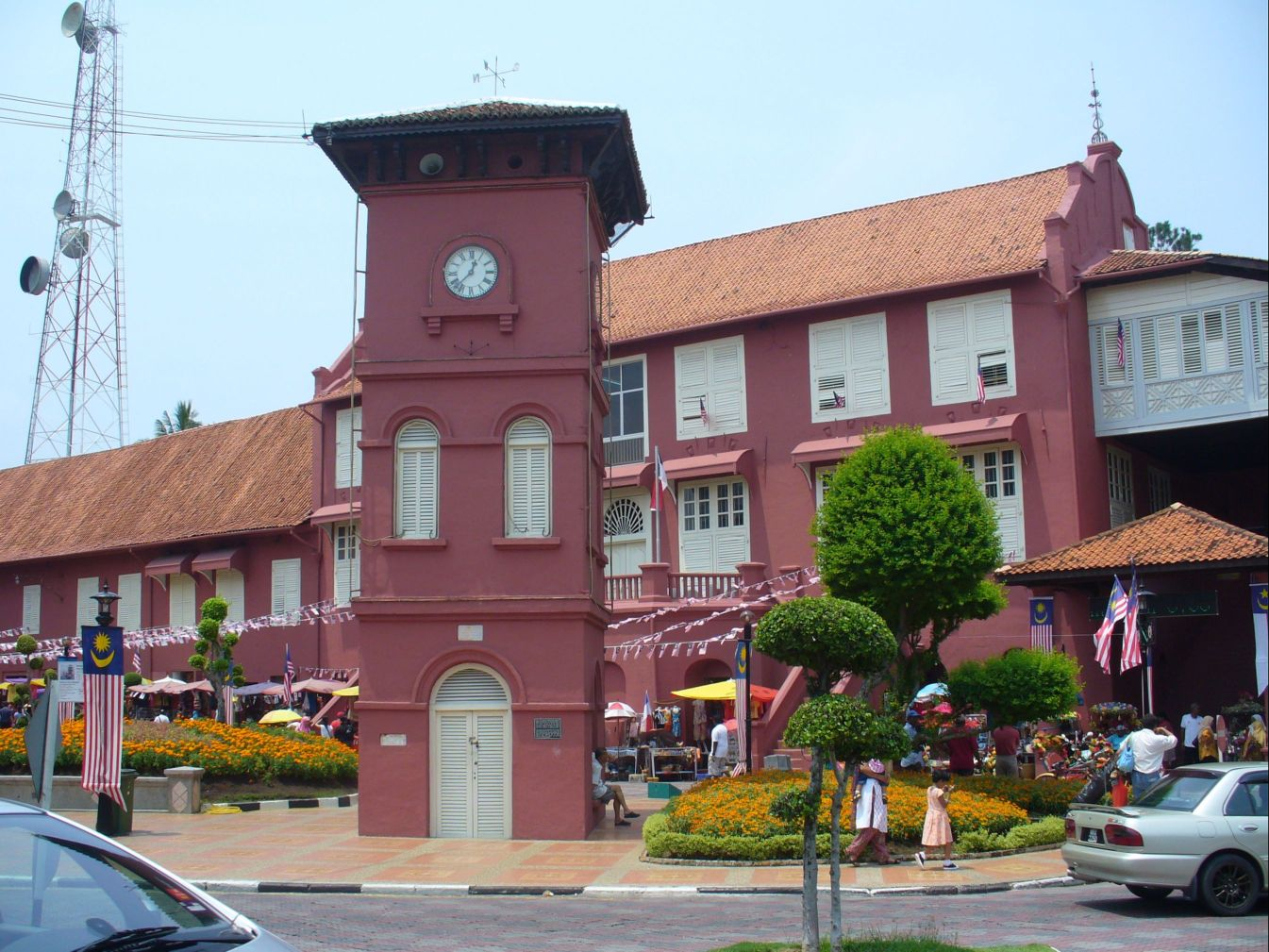
- The Stadthuys is known for its red exterior and nearby red clocktower

- Location within Malaysia

General information
- Type: Official residence
- Location: Malacca City, Malaysia
- Coordinates: 2.194059°N 102.249154°E
- Construction started: 1650; 376 years ago

The Stadthuys (an old Dutch spelling, meaning city hall) is a historical structure situated in the heart of Malacca City, the administrative capital of the state of Malacca, Malaysia, in a place known as the Red Square. The Stadthuys is known for its red exterior and nearby red clocktower. It was built by the Dutch in 1650 as the office of the Dutch governor and deputy governor. It continued to be used as the Treasury, Post Office, Government Offices, and suites of apartments for the high officials after the takeover by the British.

When Malacca was handed over to the British in the 19th century, the Malacca Free School was opened in the vicinity of the Stadthuys on 7 December 1826, by missionaries residing in the state, in response to a letter dated 19 April 1825, signed by a J. Humprey, J. W. Overee and A. W. Baumgarten, which called for an English educational institution to be built in Malacca. The school which the British provided free education to residents was eventually renamed Malacca High School in 1871 upon a takeover by the British government, and moved out to its present site at Chan Koon Cheng Road in 1931.

Situated at Laksamana Road, beside Christ Church, the supposed oldest remaining Dutch historical building in the Orient, is now home to the History and Ethnography Museum. Among the displays in the museum are traditional costumes and artifacts throughout the history of Malacca.

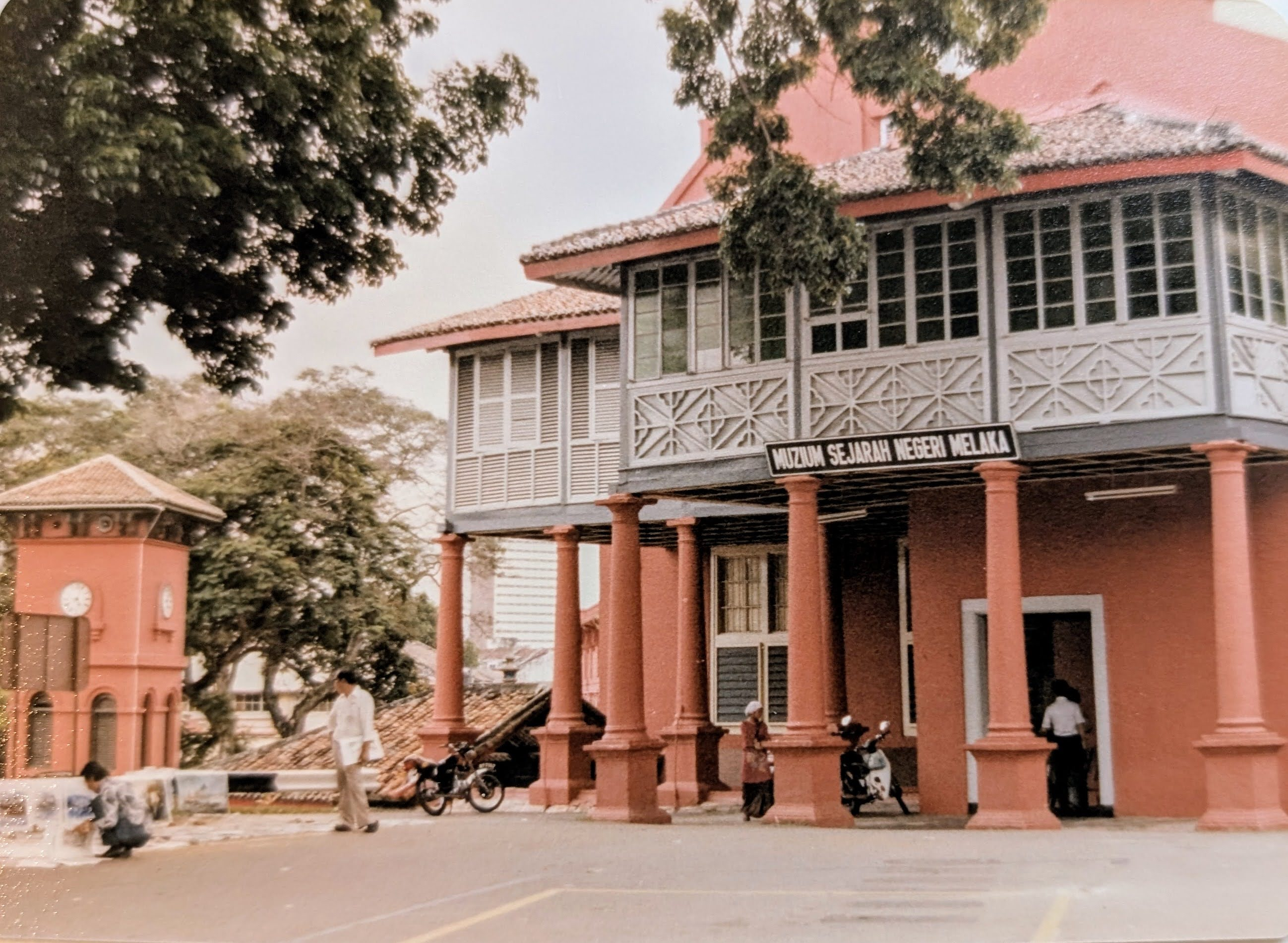
Stadhuys in 1986 with the Malacca Museum nearby

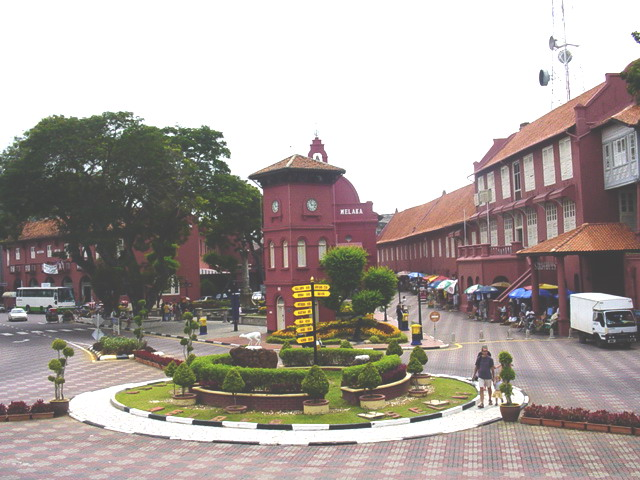
Roundabout surrounding the frontage of the Stadthuys

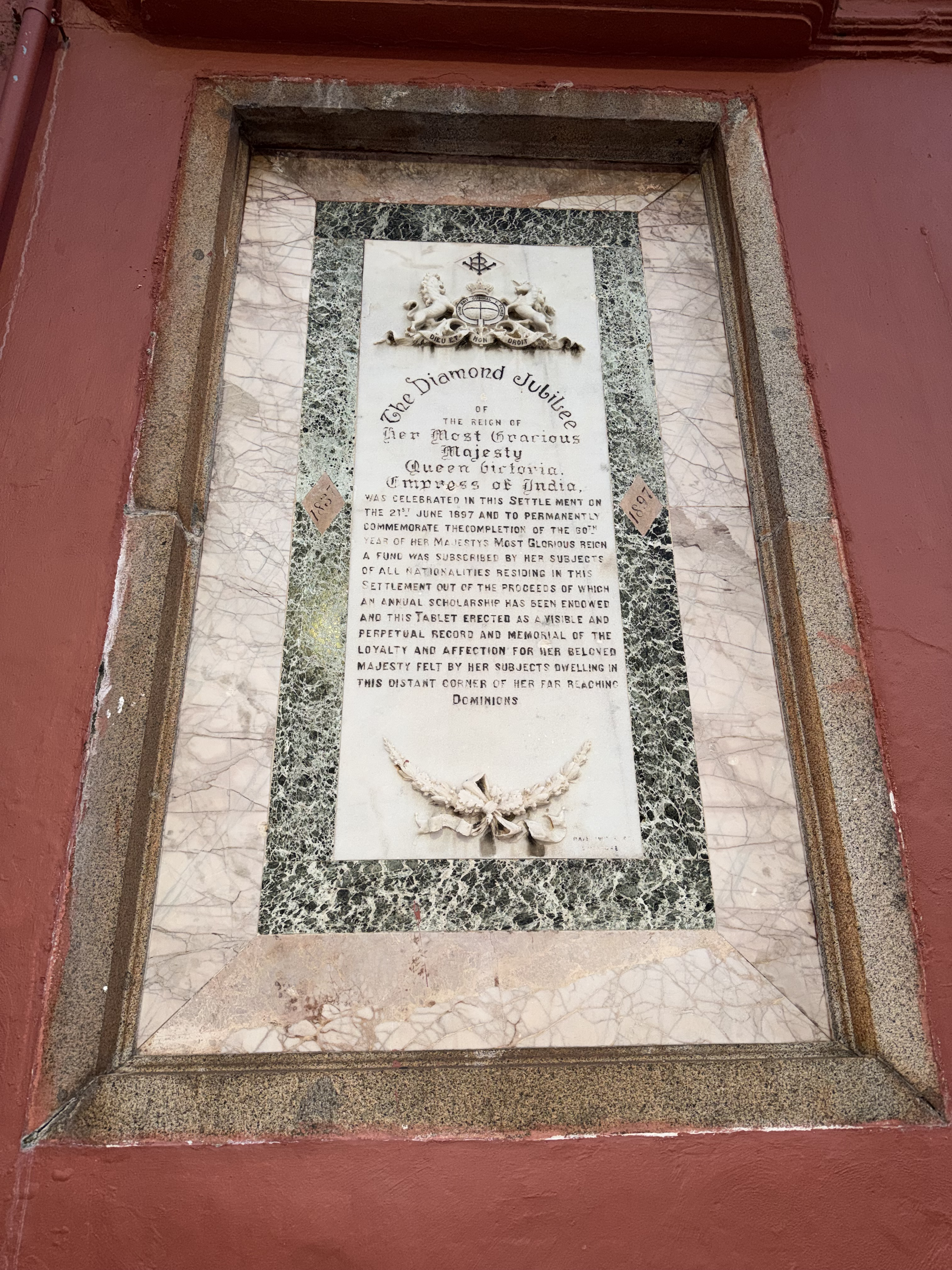
Plaque commemorating Queen Victoria's Diamond Jubilee in 1897

== See also ==
- Christ Church, Malacca
- Francis Xavier
