= Christ Church, Malacca =

Christ Church Malacca
- Malay: Gereja Kristus; Chinese: 基督堂
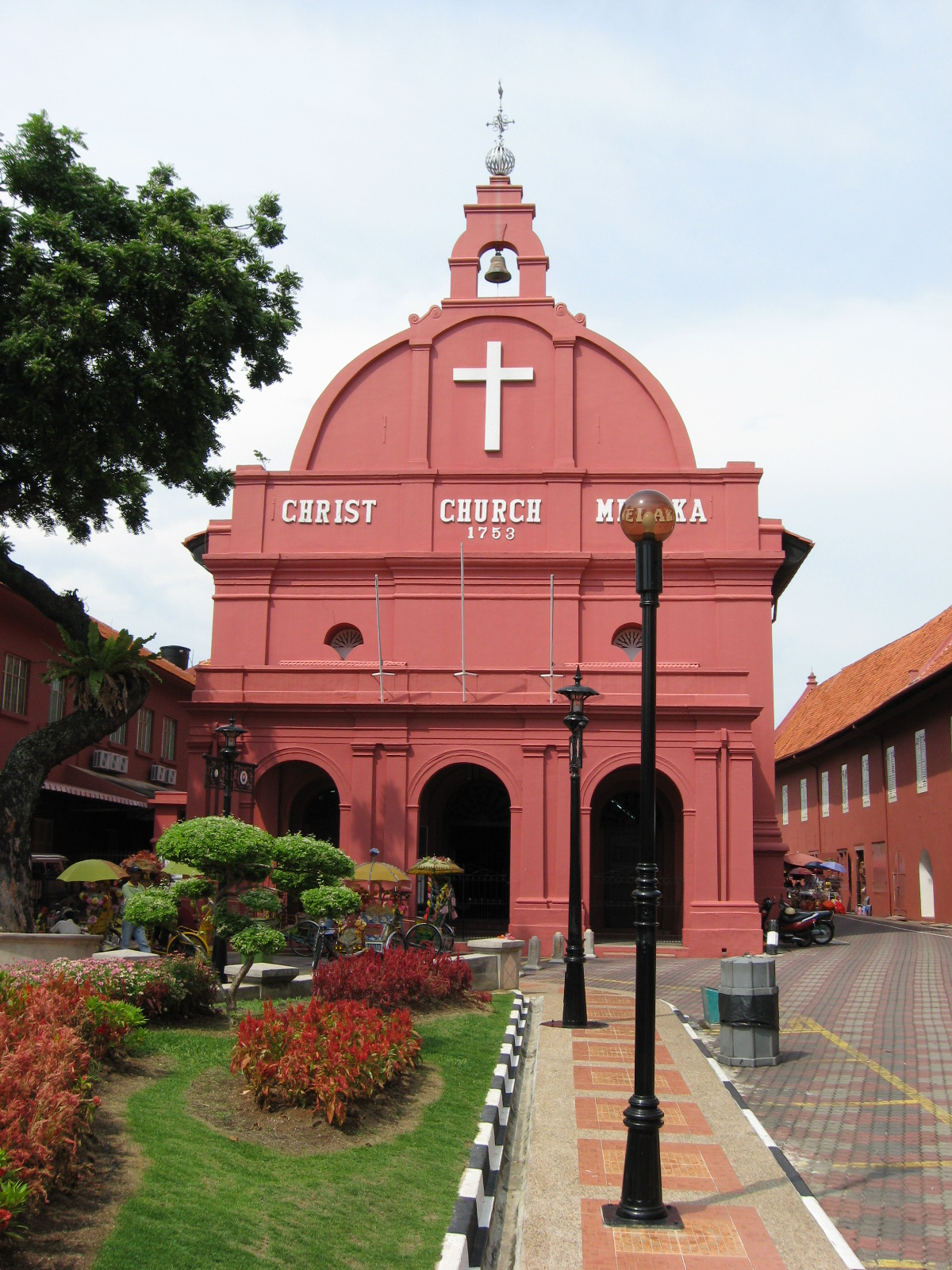
- Christ Church, Malacca
- Christ Church Malacca
- 2°11′39.6″N 102°14′57.8″E
- Location: Malacca City, Malacca
- Country: Malaysia
- Denomination: Anglican
- Previous denomination: Dutch Reformed

History
- Former name: Bovenkerk (High Church)
- Founded: 1753; 273 years ago
- Dedicated: 1776; 250 years ago
- Consecrated: 1838; 188 years ago

Architecture
- Functional status: Active
- Architectural type: Dutch Colonial
- Groundbreaking: 1741; 285 years ago
- Completed: 1753; 273 years ago

Specifications
- Length: 82 feet (25 m)
- Width: 42 feet (13 m)
- Height: 40 feet (12 m)

Administration
- District: Malacca
- Province: Province of South East Asia
- Diocese: Diocese of West Malaysia
- Archdeaconry: Lower Central Archdeaconry

Clergy
- Bishop: Rt Rev Dr. Stephen Soe Chee Chen

Christ Church, Malacca, is an 18th-century Dutch-built Anglican church (originally Dutch Reformed) in the city of Malacca City, Malaysia. It is the oldest functioning Protestant church in Malaysia and is within the jurisdiction of the Lower Central Archdeaconry of the Anglican Diocese of West Malaysia.

== History ==
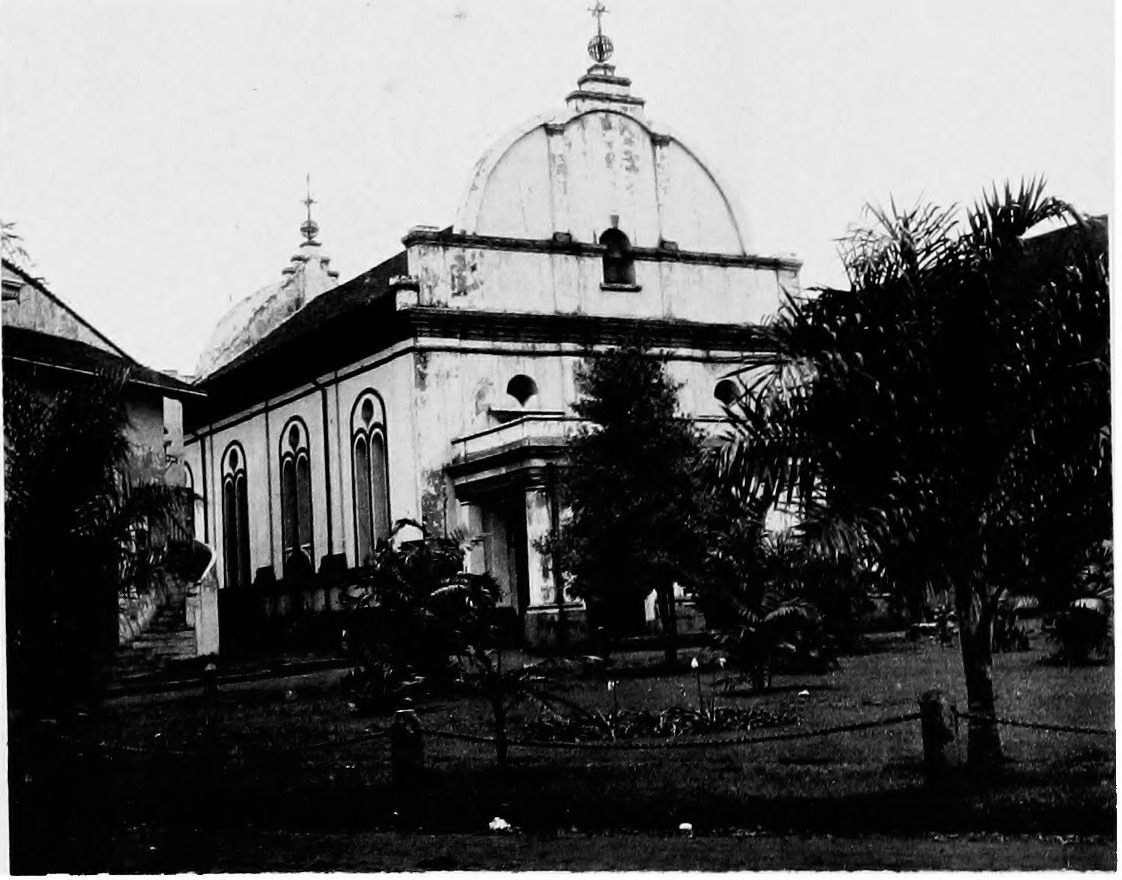
Christ Church circa 1905, with its then white exterior

The Dutch conquest of Malacca from the Portuguese Empire in 1641 saw the proscription of Roman Catholicism and the conversion of existing churches to Dutch Reformed use. The old St. Paul's Church at the summit of St. Paul Hill was renamed the Bovenkerk (Upper Church) and used as the main parish church of the Dutch community.

In 1741, in commemoration of the centenary of the capture of Malacca from the Portuguese, the Dutch burgher community decided to build a new church, replacing the aging Bovenkerk. The foundation stone was laid by the Malacca-born captain of the Malacca burghers, Abraham de Wind, on behalf of his father, Claas de Wind, a prominent burgher who had been the secunde (deputy governor) of Malacca. The church was completed 12 years later, in 1753, and replaced the Bovenkerk as the primary Dutch Reformed Church in Dutch Malacca.

With the signing of the Anglo-Dutch Treaty of 1824, possession of Malacca was transferred to the British East India Company and in 1838, the church was re-consecrated with the rites of the Church of England by Daniel Wilson, Bishop of Calcutta, and renamed Christ Church. The maintenance of the church was taken over by the government of the Straits Settlements in 1858.

Originally painted white, the church and neighbouring Stadthuys building were painted red in 1911, and this distinctive colour scheme has remained the hallmark of Malacca's Dutch-era buildings since.

== Architecture ==
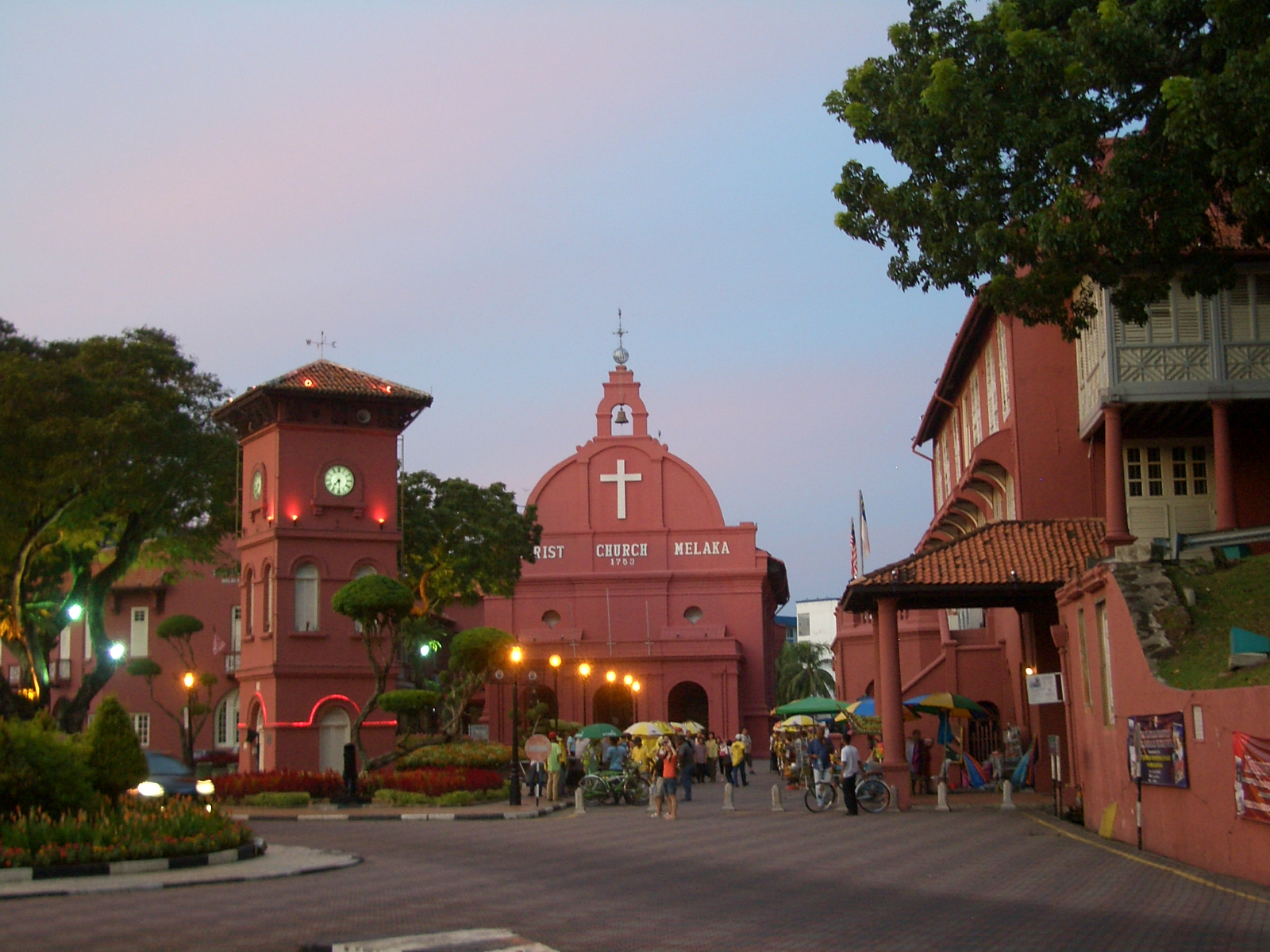
A view of the Dutch Square in Malacca, with Christ Church in the centre

The church is built in Dutch Colonial architecture style and is laid out in a simple rectangle of 82 feet (25 m) by 42 feet (13 m). The ceiling rises to 40 feet (12 m) and is spanned by wooden beams, each carved from a single tree. The roof is covered with Dutch tiles and the walls were raised using Dutch bricks built on local laterite blocks then coated with Chinese plaster. The floors of the church are paved with granite blocks originally used as ballast for merchant ships.

The original Dutch windows were reduced and ornamented after the British takeover of Malacca and the porch and vestry were built only in the mid-19th century.

== Artifacts ==
=== Tombstones and memorial plaques ===
The floors of the church also incorporate various tombstones with Portuguese and Armenian inscriptions used as paving blocks. Memorial plaques in Dutch, Armenian and English also adorn the interior of the church. Some Armenian inscriptions provide an interesting panorama of life in the Dutch period:

Greetings, you who are reading this tablet of my tomb in which I now sleep. Give me the news, the freedom of my countrymen, for them I did much weep. If there arose among them one good guardian to govern and keep. Vainly I expected the world to see a good shepherd came to look after the scattered sheep.

I, Jacob, grandson of Shamier, an Armenian of a respectable family whose name I keep, was born in Persia near Inefa, where my parents now forever sleep. Fortune brought me to distant Malacca, which my remains in bondage to keep. Separated from the world on 7th July 1774 A.D. at the age of twenty-nine, my mortal remains were deposited in this spot of the ground which I purchased.

=== Church bell ===
The church bell is inscribed with the date 1698, suggesting that it was used for another purpose prior to the completion of the church.

=== Church administration records ===
The church's collection of Kerk Boek (Church Book), Resolutie Boek (Resolution Book), Rapporten (Reports) as well as the Doop Boek (Baptism Register) going back to the earliest Dutch times in Malacca has survived through the centuries. These antique documents are now kept at the National Archives of Malaysia.

=== Silver altar vessels ===
Silver altar vessels dating back to the early Dutch period are also in the possession of the church but are kept in storage and rarely taken out for display.

=== Altar Bible ===
The altar Bible has a cover made of brass inscribed with the passage from John 1:1 in Dutch.

== Operating hours ==
Visitation Hours:

Monday: Closed

Tuesday to Saturday: 9AM - 4:30PM (Closed for lunch from 1-1:30PM)

Sunday Services:

- 8:30am - English Service
- 11am - Mandarin Service

Visitation is open until 4:30pm on Sunday after the services.

== See also ==
- Church of the Province of South East Asia
- Dutch Reformed Church
- Dutch Malacca
- Dutch East India Company
