= Negeri Sembilan FC Under-20s and Academy =

Negeri Sembilan FC's youth football teams

Negeri Sembilan Under-20s and Academy
- Full name: Negeri Sembilan Football Club Under-20s and Academy
- Nickname: Jang Mudo (Note: Jang is a short for Ujang, a second-person pronoun for males in Negeri Sembilan Malay. Also, Mudo is a Negeri Sembilan Malay dialect of Muda (English: Young))
- Short name: NSFCIII; NSEIII
- Founded: 1985; 41 years ago (as Negeri Sembilan Under-21); 2023; 3 years ago (as Negeri Sembilan Under-20); 2026; 0 years ago (as Negeri Sembilan III)
- Ground: Kuala Pilah Mini Stadium
- Capacity: 2,000
- Owner: Negeri Sembilan Football Association
- Chairman: Dato' Seri Utama Haji Aminuddin Harun
- Head coach: Hamdan Mohamad
- League: President Cup
- 2025: President Cup, 5th of 11
- Website: www.nsfc1923.com
Home colours	Away colours	Third colours

Negeri Sembilan Football Club Under-20s, currently known as Negeri Sembilan Football Club III, is the most senior of Negeri Sembilan's youth teams. They play in the President Cup, the highest youth football league in Malaysia.

Negeri Sembilan has established the under-21 team since the President Cup was introduced in 1985. In 2008, FAM introduced the Youth Cup, which competes with under-19 teams for every professional team in Malaysia. Negeri Sembilan established the under-19 team that year. The involvement of the under-21s teams in the youth tournaments and has produced talented players such as Ching Hong Aik, Shukor Adan, Zaquan Adha, Aidil Zafuan, S. Kunanlan.

== History ==
=== Early era ===
Since its introduction, President Cup has been the major tournament for under-21 and under-23 players.

=== 2000s ===
Negeri Sembilan U-21 won their first President Cup title in 2001 after defeating Selangor U-21 2–1 in the final. The club retained the championship the following season by recording a 3–0 victory over Pahang U-21 in the final, becoming back-to-back winners and establishing Negeri Sembilan U-21 as one of the competition's leading teams during the early 2000s.

In 2008, Negeri Sembilan has established under-19 team to compete in Youth Cup (Piala Belia). Since its introduction, it has served as Malaysia's premier youth competition. Beginning in 2023, the age limit was lowered to under-18 in line with the Asian Football Confederation (AFC) youth competition cycle.

=== 2020s ===
On 25 February 2026, Negeri Sembilan announced the selection of under-20 coach Norhafiz Zamani together with Airiel Zafran Azrul, Aqil Faris Shalahudin, and Adam Haris Hamizon for a development programme at Japanese club Gainare Tottori.

Negeri Sembilan U-18 was renamed Negeri Sembilan FC III and replaced its participation in the Youth Cup with the President Cup. The club retained the squad and coaching staff from the previous season. Despite continuing to consist exclusively of under-18 players, the team was classified as an under-20 side (NSFC III). Meanwhile, the former U-20 team was rebranded as Negeri Sembilan FC II and become the club's reserve team, competing in the 2026–27 A1 Semi-Pro League.

== Negeri Sembilan FC III squad ==
=== Current squad ===
As of 5 June 2026

No	Pos	Nat	Names	D.O.B	Age
62	DF	(Malaysia)	Muhammad Darwish Iqram Bin Abdul Rahim	06.10.2007	19
63	DF	(Malaysia)	Muhammad Khamil Bin Adenan	16.10.2008	18
64	FW	(Malaysia)	Muhammad Bilal Benyamin Bin Mat Sakri	06.10.2008	18
65	MF	(Malaysia)	Ahmad Aqil Rayyan Bin Ahmad Faizal	01.05.2008	18
66	DF	(Malaysia)	Muhammad Danial Zulkarnain Bin Mohamad Shahrulnizam	06.11.2008	18
67	MF	(Malaysia)	Aswan Bin Adi	13.12.2007	19
68	DF	(Malaysia)	Afiq Zimam Bin Shahril Izzuddin	01.07.2008	18
69	MF	(Malaysia)	Muhammad Afiq Haikal Bin Mohd Al Hafiz	25.09.2007	19
70	DF	(Malaysia)	Muhammad Iman Thaqif Bin Mohd Nazri	11.09.2007	19
71	GK	(Malaysia)	Muhammad Danial Haikal Bin Khairul Anuar	23.01.2008	18
72	MF	(Malaysia)	Adhwa' Irsyad Bin Mohamed Som	14.05.2008	18
73	DF	(Malaysia)	Muhammad Azri Hanif Bin Noor	19.11.2007	19
74	DF	(Malaysia)	Muhammad Aidil Afdhal Bin Abd Latif	12.01.2008	18
75	FW	(Malaysia)	Ahmad Akil Danial Bin Ahmad Johari	10.08.2008	18
76	DF	(Malaysia)	Muhammad Izzat Nadzir Bin Mohd Nazri	28.05.2008	18
77	FW	(Malaysia)	Muhammad Amirul Hazmi Bin Muhammad Ikram	29.01.2008	18
78	DF	(Malaysia)	Mohamad Aiman Asyraf Bin Sharul Azhar	30.12.2008	18
79	FW	(Malaysia)	Farish Haiqal Bin Rosman	26.03.2007	19
80	FW	(Malaysia)	Muhammad Wassem Rifqi Bin Zulkiflee	15.09.2008	18
81	GK	(Malaysia)	Muhammad Adam Mikhail B Mhd Saffiyan	25.03.2008	18
82	MF	(Malaysia)	Mohammad Khairul Akhmal Bin Khairul Sharizal	27.07.2008	18
83	DF	(Malaysia)	Muhammad Zuryharith Bin Mohd Zafran	04.12.2008	18
84	DF	(Malaysia)	Mohamad Faris Ikmal Bin Mohamad Rahmat	19.02.2008	18
85	DF	(Malaysia)	Muhamad Ammar Yusuf Bin Mohd Faizul	10.05.2008	18
86	DF	(Malaysia)	Aidil Haziq Bin Ahmad Marzuki	13.01.2008	18
87	DF	(Malaysia)	Nazmi Idham Bin Nasir	10.03.2008	18
88	MF	(Malaysia)	Muhammad Mikail Darwis Bin Nor Azuan	18.03.2008	18
89	MF	(Malaysia)	Muhammad Yusof Rayyan Bin Mohd Salleh	03.07.2008	18
90	FW	(Malaysia)	Afif Ikhwan Bin Nor Affendy	16.03.2008	18
91	GK	(Malaysia)	Zikry Faris Bin Zulkifli	03.12.2008	18
92	DF	(Malaysia)	Muhammad Faiz Bin Marzuki	11.01.2008	18

=== NSFC III coaching staff ===
As of 5 June 2026

Position	Staff
Team manager	(Malaysia) Kalidasan a/l Sinuam @ Sinniah
Head coach	(Malaysia) Hamdan Bin Mohamad
Assistant head coach	(Malaysia) Noorhisham Bin Kamarudin
Goalkeeper coach	(Malaysia) Mohd Sany Fahmi
Goalkeeper coach	(Malaysia) Abd Jalil Man
Fitness coach	(Malaysia) Masmal Hadi Bin Shukor
Physiotherapist	(Malaysia) Muhamad Fariz Bin Rosli
Team admin	(Malaysia) Che Muhammad Alif Taqiyuddin
Team analyst	(Malaysia) Ilham Bin Armadi
Kitman	(Malaysia) Muhamad Amirul Fitri Bin Muhamad Zambry

=== Managerial history ===
List of Negeri Sembilan III former coaches/managers.

Tenure	Coach	Achievement
2011	(Malaysia) Yusarman Yusof	
2012–2015	(Malaysia) Badrul Afzan Razali	
2016	(Malaysia) Ahmad Fairuz Yunus	
2017–2019	(Malaysia) Sazali Saidun	
2020–2022	(Malaysia) Azzmi Aziz	
2023–2024	(Malaysia) Azlan Ahmad	
2025	(Malaysia) Norhafiz Zamani	
2026–present	(Malaysia) Hamdan Mohamad	

== Negeri Sembilan FC U-18 ==
Negeri Sembilan Under-18
- Full name: Negeri Sembilan Football Club Under-18
- Nickname: Jang Mudo (Note: Jang is a short for Ujang, a second-person pronoun for males in Negeri Sembilan Malay. Also, Mudo is a Negeri Sembilan Malay dialect of Muda (English: Young))
- Founded: 2008; 18 years ago (as Negeri Sembilan Under-19); 2023; 3 years ago (as Negeri Sembilan Under-18)
- Dissolved: 2026; 0 years ago
- Ground: Kuala Pilah Mini Stadium
- Capacity: 2,000
- Owner: Negeri Sembilan Football Association
- Chairman: Dato' Seri Utama Haji Aminuddin Harun
- Head coach: Azmi Mohamed
- League: Youth Cup
- 2025: Youth Cup, 10th of 14

Negeri Sembilan Under-18s or simply NSFC U-18 played in the Youth Cup, the 2nd tier of the youth level football league in Malaysia. In 2026, the NSFC U-18 withdrew from the Youth Cup.

=== Managerial history ===
List of Negeri Sembilan U-18 former coaches/managers.

Tenure	Coach	Achievement
2012–2014	(Malaysia) Kuppan a/l M.Nathan	
2015	(Malaysia) Zainuddin Hussein	
2016	(Malaysia) Rahimmudin Abdul Rahman	
2017	(Malaysia) Syafiq Jonny Abdullah	
2018–2019	(Malaysia) Adnan Md Din	
2020–2022	(Malaysia) Azlan Ahmad	
2024	(Malaysia) Kamarudin Anuar	
2025	(Malaysia) Azmi Mohamed	

== Honours ==
Negeri Sembilan U-20s honours
Team	Competition	Titles	Seasons
NSFC III (Under-20)	President Cup	2	2001, 2002

=== Club's top goalscorer ===
Seasons	President Cup (Note: Negeri Sembilan U-21 (1985–2022), Negeri Sembilan U-20 (2023–2026), Negeri Sembilan III (2026-present))		Youth Cup (Note: Negeri Sembilan U-19 (2008–2022), Negeri Sembilan U-18 (2023–2026))	
Seasons	Players	Goals	Players	Goals
2016	(Malaysia) Sean Eugene Selvaraj	6	(Malaysia) Iskandar Noorisam	4
2017	(Malaysia) Sean Eugene Selvaraj	5	(Malaysia) Haziq Fikri Haszaime	7
2018	(Malaysia) Zairul Aidiel	4	(Malaysia) N. Javabilaarivin	7
2019	(Malaysia) Haziq Fikri Haszaime	3	(Malaysia) N. Javabilaarivin	7
2019	(Malaysia) Hafizie Erwinshah	3	(Malaysia) N. Javabilaarivin	7
2019	(Malaysia) S. Gevanesh	3	(Malaysia) N. Javabilaarivin	7
2020	(Malaysia) N. Javabilaarivin	3	(Malaysia) Zaidi Abdul Hamid	2
2020	(Malaysia) N. Javabilaarivin	3	(Malaysia) Amirul Hakimi Rosli	2
2020	(Malaysia) N. Javabilaarivin	3	(Malaysia) B. Thaban Raj	2
2020	(Malaysia) N. Javabilaarivin	3	(Malaysia) Haziq Mokhtar	2
2021	cancelled and declared null and void due to COVID-19 pandemic			
2022	(Malaysia) Hakimi Kamal	2	(Malaysia) Danish Syamer	6
2022	(Malaysia) Zaidi Abdul Hamid	2	(Malaysia) Danish Syamer	6
2023	(Malaysia) Danish Syamer	13	Withdrew	
2024	(Malaysia) Zaim Iqbal	5	(Malaysia) Hani Amir	4
2025	(Malaysia) Airiel Zafran	8	(Malaysia) Aswan Adi	13

==== NSFC U-23 (2023–2025) ====
Club's top goalscorer for MFL Cup.

Seasons	Players	Goals
2023	(Malaysia) Harith Samsuri	6
2024–25	(Malaysia) Adam Haris Hamizon	3
2024–25	(Malaysia) Hariz Kamarudin	3

== Season by season records ==
=== Negeri Sembilan III ===
1st or Champions 2nd or Runner-up 3rd place

Season	Piala Presiden			Note	Ref
Season	Group	Pos	Knockout (Note: Knockout stage applies only to competitions that consist of two rounds: a group stage followed by a knockout stage.)	Note	Ref
1993			Runners-up	(Note: Lost 2–3 vs Melaka U-21 in the final.)	
2001			Champions	(Note: Won 1–0 vs Selangor U-21 in the final.)	
2002			Champions	(Note: Won 3–0 vs Pahang U-21 in the final)	
2007–08	A	5th	Not qualify		
2009	A	5th	Not qualify		
2010	B	5th	Not qualify		
2011	B	7th	Not qualify		
2012	B	8th	Not qualify		
2013	—	7th	Quarter-finals (4th in group A)		
2014	A	2nd	Quarter-finals		
2015	B	7th	Not qualify		
2016	A	15th	Not qualify		
2017	B	1st	Quarter-finals		
2018	B	7th	Not qualify		
2019	B	7th	Not qualify		
2020	cancelled and declared null and void due to COVID-19 pandemic				
2021	cancelled and declared null and void due to COVID-19 pandemic				
2022	B	6th	Not qualify		
2023	1	2nd	Runner-up	(Note: Lost on aggregate 1–5 vs JDT III in the finals.)	
2024	B	2nd	Quarter-finals		
2025	—	5th	—	RR	
2026				RR	

=== Negeri Sembilan U-18 ===
1st or Champions 2nd or Runner-up 3rd place

Season	Piala Belia			Note	Ref
Season	Group	Pos	Knockout (Note: Knockout stage applies only to competitions that consist of two rounds: a group stage in the first round, followed by a knockout stage in the second round.)	Note	Ref
2009–2011	Merged with Piala Presiden				
2012			Quarter-finals		
2013			Quarter-finals		
2014	B	3rd	Quarter-finals		
2015	—	13th	Not qualify		
2016	A	7th	Not qualify		
2017	B	7th	Not qualify		
2018	B	1st	Quarter-finals		
2019	B	8th	Not qualify		
2020	cancelled and declared null and void due to COVID-19 pandemic				
2021	cancelled and declared null and void due to COVID-19 pandemic				
2022	B	5th	Not qualify		
2023	Withdrew				
2024	A	6th	Not qualify		
2025	—	10th	—	RR	
2026	Withdrew				

=== Negeri Sembilan U-23 ===
1st or Champions 2nd or Runner-up 3rd place

Season	MFL Cup										Note	Ref
Season	Group	Pld	W	D	L	F	A	Pts	Pos	Champions (Note: Refer 2023 MFL Cup format for the competition rules.)	Note	Ref
2023	B	12	2	9	1	12	10	15	5th	Not qualify		
2024–25	—	24	7	8	9	19	20	29	8th	—	RR	

== School development & grassroots ==
Negeri Sembilan also owns and affiliates with several schools and grassroots level development teams, such as under-17s, under-14s, under-12s, under-10s and Girls under-15s.

Teams	Competition
Under-17s (SMK Za'ba)	KPM-FAM Youth Cup League U-17
Under-14s (SMK Za'ba)	Piala Menteri Pendidikan Malaysia League U-14
NSFC Under-12s	FAM-MSN National Youth League U-12
NSFC Seremban Under-12s	Negeri Sembilan Suparimau League (Season A) U-12
NSFC Under-10s	KFAM International Youth Football Cup U-10
NSFC Seremban Under-10s	Negeri Sembilan Suparimau League (Season A) U-10
NSFC Seremban Under-8s A	Negeri Sembilan Suparimau League (Season A) U-8
NSFC Seremban Under-8s B	Negeri Sembilan Suparimau League (Season A) U-8
NSFC (Girls) under-15s	Liga Puteri U-16 (Div 1)

=== Negeri Sembilan U-17 (SMK Za'ba) ===
Currently plays in the KPM-FAM Youth Cup League U-17 for 2026.

==== Under-17 squad ====
As of 17 June 2026

No	Pos	Nat	Names	D.O.B	Age
1	GK	(Malaysia)	Muhammad Izzat Hilmi Bin Aznan	17.08.2009	17
2	DF	(Malaysia)	Muhammad Azmel Haized Bin Mohd Hanaffi	18.08.2009	17
3	DF	(Malaysia)	Muhammad Ammar Afif Bin Mohd Fitri	03.11.2009	17
4	MF	(Malaysia)	Muhammad Faidhi Irfan Bin Mohd Fadeli	18.02.2009	17
5	DF	(Malaysia)	Muhammad Ammar Haziq Bin Norizam	27.02.2009	17
6	MF	(Malaysia)	Ryan Nasafie Bin Muhammad Ahyauddin	17.03.2009	17
7	MF	(Malaysia)	Muhammad Ryan Fikry Bin Shahrul Saifully	07.02.2009	17
8	FW	(Malaysia)	Arrayyan Affi Bin Muhammad Faizal	11.08.2009	17
9	FW	(Malaysia)	Muhammad Iman Husaini Bin Mohd Azahari	24.03.2009	17
10	MF	(Malaysia)	Murtadza Zikri Bin Mohd Afudzal	13.02.2009	17
11	FW	(Malaysia)	Tuan Hazim Rifqi Bin Tuan Shamsorizam	21.06.2009	17
12	DF	(Malaysia)	Muhammad Thaqif Darwisy Bin Azman	30.09.2009	17
13	DF	(Malaysia)	Ahmad Darwish Bin Ahmad Akhbar	07.03.2009	17
14	DF	(Malaysia)	Muhammad Adam Nurrahman Bin Mohd Khairil Redza	28.01.2009	17
15	DF	(Malaysia)	Muhammad Amirul Mustaqim Bin Md Zuljumali	25.02.2009	17
16	FW	(Malaysia)	Muhammad Azril Bin Khairul Nizam	26.01.2010	16
17	DF	(Malaysia)	Muhammad Hakim Bin Sallehuddin	21.04.2010	16
18	GK	(Malaysia)	Muhammad Zafiq Bin Muhammad Zamri	01.10.2010	16
19	DF	(Malaysia)	Mohd Fariz Aiman B Bin Mohd Fairusazril	14.11.2010	16
20	MF	(Malaysia)	Muhammad Irfan Bin Zainal Islah	12.02.2010	16
21	DF	(Malaysia)	Muhammad Na’imullah Bin Abdullah	29.05.2010	16
22	FW	(Malaysia)	Ammar Nur Harith Mohd Nazri Bin Abdul Karim	11.11.2010	16
23	DF	(Malaysia)	Dubeis Haiqal Zulqarnain Bin Abdullah	09.09.2009	17
24	MF	(Malaysia)	Nor Aiman Aqil B Norsyamsyari	29.08.2009	17
25	DF	(Malaysia)	Muhammad Aniq Hafizuddin Bin Azrul Hisham	13.05.2010	16
26	MF	(Malaysia)	Wan Muhammad Darwish Bin Mohd Fazli	26.01.2010	16
27	DF	(Malaysia)	Oshair Aqeef Bin Omaira	17.05.2010	16
28	MF	(Malaysia)	Mu'adz Bin Norazhar	05.02.2010	16
29	MF	(Malaysia)	Muhammad Haniff Bin Ramli	02.07.2010	16
30	MF	(Malaysia)	Syed Adlan Rayqal Bin Syed Shaniz Shariman	10.05.2010	16
31	MF	(Malaysia)	Muhammad Nazeem Zhafran Bin Muhammad Firdaus	14.01.2010	16
32	DF	(Malaysia)	Muhammad Rifkie Bin Khairul Azwan	24.09.2010	16
33	MF	(Malaysia)	Muhammad Amir Naqib Bin Mohd Norizam	04.05.2010	16
34	GK	(Malaysia)	Ahmad Ajwad Harraz Bin Mohd Nor	20.11.2009	17
35	DF	(Malaysia)	Arrayyan Aqiff Bin Muhammad Faizal	20.09.2010	16

==== Under-17 coaching staff ====
As of 17 June 2026

Position	Staff
Team manager	Azman Jamaat
Assistant team manager	Faiz Roslan
Head Coach	Amarul Nazar Mohamed
Assistant head coach	Hakimy Ramly
Assistant coach	Azuhar Abdul Ghapar
Goalkeeper coach	Syafaiz Saufi
Fitness coach	Syed Salim Syed Akil
Physiotherapist	Zakir Wan Ahmad
Kitman	Farid Affa Faizal

=== Negeri Sembilan U-14 (SMK Za'ba) ===
Currently plays in Piala Menteri Pendidikan Malaysia League U-14 for 2026.

==== Under-14 squad ====
As of 17 June 2026

No	Pos	Nat	Names	D.O.B	Age
1	GK	(Malaysia)	Rizq Bin Abdul Rashid	15.07.2012	14
2	DF	(Malaysia)	Muhammad Aqlan Bin Abd Razaq	27.03.2012	14
3	DF	(Malaysia)	Muhammad Rifdi Bin Mohd Riduan	18.02.2012	14
4	DF	(Malaysia)	Muhammad Mueez Qhaliq Bin Mujahizudin	22.01.2012	14
5	DF	(Malaysia)	Humam Thaqif Bin Mohd Syukri	14.02.2012	14
6	MF	(Malaysia)	Putra Harriz Rafiqi Bin Azrul Aiin	12.02.2012	14
7	MF	(Malaysia)	Shaikh Danish Ariel Bin Shaikh Asmawi	20.04.2012	14
8	MF	(Malaysia)	Muhammad Amirun Haziq Bin Muhamad Azmi	14.03.2012	14
9	MF	(Malaysia)	Muhammad Aqeel Naufal Bin Ros Naqiuddin	03.07.2012	14
10	FW	(Malaysia)	Muhammad Arfan Mukhriz Bin Mohd Yusuff	05.03.2012	14
11	FW	(Malaysia)	Johan Marzly Fahmi Bin Abdullah	24.04.2012	14
12	MF	(Malaysia)	Muhammad Addim Rayyan Bin Mohd Aidil	08.01.2012	14
13	MF	(Malaysia)	Seshvar a/l Selva Kumar	22.04.2012	14
14	DF	(Malaysia)	Ahmad Adam Rasul	12.06.2012	14
15	DF	(Malaysia)	Aqmar Irfan Bin Mohd Yusoff	07.02.2012	14
16	DF	(Malaysia)	Mohamad Ariff Saifuddin Bin Mohmad Azmi	17.03.2012	14
17	MF	(Malaysia)	Muhammad Iffat Zaqwan Bin Muhamad Ridzuan	07.05.2012	14
18	GK	(Malaysia)	Muhammad Hadiff Ziqry Bin Mohd Nazri	14.11.2012	14
19	MF	(Malaysia)	Muhammad Ikhwan Bin Ismail	25.03.2013	13
20	DF	(Malaysia)	Iman Izz Zharif Bin Shamsulrizal	27.04.2013	13
21	DF	(Malaysia)	Muhamad Khaireil Fiqri Bin Muhamad Khairul	26.03.2013	13
22	GK	(Malaysia)	Shahrul Rayyan Azman Bin Shahrul Azman Rashid	06.04.2013	13
23	FW	(Malaysia)	Riyyad Iman Bin Haizul Azmi	21.10.2013	13
24	DF	(Malaysia)	Muhammad Shaamel Bin Mohd Sharani	03.03.2013	13
25	MF	(Malaysia)	Muhammad Aryan Rayyan Bin Hisham	19.07.2013	13
26	FW	(Malaysia)	Affan Hadiff Bin Noor Hisyam	13.04.2013	13
27	DF	(Malaysia)	Muhammad Nur Rayyan Hakim Bin Muhammad Joerizam	24.04.2013	13
28	MF	(Malaysia)	Muhammad Mikhail Hadif Bin Mahadhir	03.02.2013	13
29	DF	(Malaysia)	Muhamad Adib Nuraqib Bin Ramlan	22.04.2013	13
30	DF	(Malaysia)	Muhammad Qayyum Bin Ismanisam	24.01.2013	13
31	DF	(Malaysia)	Muhammad Eilman Aqief Bin Zaimi Anuar	22.04.2013	13
32	MF	(Malaysia)	Muhammad Adam Haikal Bin Wira	06.02.2013	13
33	DF	(Malaysia)	Thaqif Ayyasy Bin Zaidi	09.08.2013	13
34	FW	(Malaysia)	Muhammad Aiman Hassan Bin Abdul Malik	01.07.2013	13
35	GK	(Malaysia)	Meor Muhammad Husaini Bin Hasnul	09.06.2013	13

==== Under-14 coaching staff ====
As of 17 June 2026

Position	Staff
Team manager	Azman Jamaat
Assistant team manager	Zahiruddin Amirudin
Head coach	Azuhar Abdul Ghapar
Assistant head coach	Syafaiz Saufi
Assistant coach	Hakimy Ramly
Goalkeeper coach	Zakir Wan Ahmad
Fitness coach	Syed Salim Syed Akil
Physiotherapist	Faiz Roslan
Kitman	Farid Affa Faizal

=== Negeri Sembilan U-12 ===
Currently plays in the FAM-MSN National Youth League U-12 for 2026.

==== NSFC U-12 squad ====
As of 16 June 2026

No	Pos	Nat	Names
1	GK	(Malaysia)	Nurfirash Akmal Bin Fadzlia Sabr
2	FW	(Malaysia)	Darrshan a/l Ganesh
3	DF	(Malaysia)	Syabil Zill Qayyim Bin Muhd Soleh
4	MF	(Malaysia)	Shahrani Dayyan Bin Mohd Azlanshah
5	FW	(Malaysia)	Muhammad Arsyad Bin Mohd Haizad
6	DF	(Malaysia)	Muhammad Rashraf Bin Rashit
7	MF	(Malaysia)	Muhammad Aisy Aryan Bin Mohamad Zaquan Adha
8	MF	(Malaysia)	Irfan Arif Bin Mohd Zuhair
9	MF	(Malaysia)	Ayyad Absyar Bin Mohd Khairul Anuar
10	MF	(Malaysia)	Adzim Mikhail Bin Abdullah Syam
11	DF	(Malaysia)	Muhammad Adam Firas Bin Mohd Hasrol Hafiz
12	DF	(Malaysia)	Iqram Mirza Bin Mohamad Izmel
13	MF	(Malaysia)	Harraz Zhafran Bin Hesley Herman
14	MF	(Malaysia)	Muhammad Dhiya Darwisy Bin Mohd Affandi
15	MF	(Malaysia)	Izham Yusuf Bin Mohd Fazli
16	MF	(Malaysia)	Muhammad Athar Qusyairi Bin Baharudin
17	FW	(Malaysia)	Muhammad Zuryhazriel Bin Mohd Zafran
18	FW	(Malaysia)	Arjuna Amsyar Bin Mohd Taufik
19	MF	(Malaysia)	Muhammad Indra Putra Haiqal Bin Baharudding
20	DF	(Malaysia)	Zafrel Ryan Bin Mohd Zulfamee
21	GK	(Malaysia)	Mohamad Raiqal Faidwan Bin Mohd Saiful Faidzul

==== NSFC U-12 coaching staff ====
As of 16 June 2026

Position	Staff
Assistant team manager	Zahiruddin Amirudin
Head coach	Fairuredza Kassim
Goalkeeper coach	Kaharudin Rahman

== Former development teams ==
Teams	Years
Negeri Sembilan U-23	2023–2025
Negeri Sembilan U-18	2008–2026

=== Negeri Sembilan FC U-23 ===
The U-23 team participated in the competition during the 2023 and 2024–25 seasons, before the MFL announced the competition's dissolution on 24 March 2025. Following the competition's discontinuation, the club disbanded its U-23 team and shifted its focus to the development of its U-20 and U-18 teams.

== Academy graduates ==
This is a list of former Negeri Sembilan academy players who have made appearances at youth and senior international level.

- (Malaysia) Ching Hong Aik
- (Malaysia) Hamsani Ahmad
- (Malaysia) Khairil Zainal
- (Malaysia) Faizal Zainal
- (Malaysia) Efendi Abdul Malek
- (Malaysia) Suffian Rahman
- (Malaysia) Shukor Adan
- (Malaysia) Norhafiz Zamani
- (Malaysia) Yosri Derma Raju
- (Malaysia) Syamsol Sabtu
- (Malaysia) K. Rajan
- (Malaysia) Zaquan Adha
- (Malaysia) Aidil Zafuan
- (Malaysia) S. Kunanlan
- (Malaysia) Abdul Halim Zainal
- (Malaysia) K. Ravindran
- (Malaysia) N. Thanabalan
- (Malaysia) Fauzan Fauzi
- (Malaysia) A. Selvan
- (Malaysia) N. Javabilaarivin
- (Malaysia) Zuryhakim Zafran
- (Malaysia) Danish Syamer

== Affiliations ==
- Kolej Yayasan Negeri Sembilan

Kolej Yayasan Negeri Sembilan (KYNS) and Negeri Sembilan Football Club signed a Memorandum of Understanding that aims to promote the development of local talent, in addition to providing training and education programmes to players.

- SSN Negeri Sembilan (SMK Za'ba)

As part of its youth development structure, Negeri Sembilan renewed its Memorandum of Understanding (MOU) with Sekolah Sukan Negeri Sembilan (SMK Za'ba, Kuala Pilah). The partnership provides a pathway for the school's under-14 and under-17 squads to represent the club.
