= 2018 Piala Belia =

2018 Malaysia Youth Cup

Tournament details
- Country: Malaysia
- Teams: 20

Final positions
- Champions: PKNS U19
- Runners-up: Terengganu IV

Tournament statistics
- Matches played: 193
- Goals scored: 460 (2.38 per match)
- All statistics correct as of 26 August 2018.

The 2018 Piala Belia (transl. Youth Cup) is the eighth season of the Piala Belia since its establishment in 2008. The league is currently the youth level (U19) football league in Malaysia. Kedah U19 are the defending champions.

== Teams ==
The following teams are participating in the 2018 Piala Belia.

- Felda United U19
- Johor Darul Ta'zim IV
- Kedah U19
- Kelantan U19
- Kuala Lumpur U19
- Melaka U19
- Negeri Sembilan U19
- Pahang U19
- Perak U19
- Perlis U19
- PKNP U19
- PKNS U19
- Pulau Pinang U19
- Sabah U19
- Sarawak U19
- Selangor U19
- SSBJ U16
- SSTMI U17
- Terengganu IV
- UiTM U19

== League table ==
=== Group A ===
Pos	Team	Pld	W	D	L	GF	GA	GD	Pts	Qualification
1	Terengganu IV	18	13	5	0	34	6	+28	44	Knockout Stage
2	Sabah U19	18	8	5	5	27	21	+6	29	Knockout Stage
3	Kuala Lumpur U19	18	8	5	5	23	17	+6	29	Knockout Stage
4	PKNS U19	18	7	6	5	22	18	+4	27	Knockout Stage
5	PKNP U19	18	6	8	4	19	14	+5	26	
6	Selangor U19	18	7	4	7	21	23	−2	25	
7	Pulau Pinang U19	18	7	2	9	18	24	−6	23	
8	Pahang U19	18	5	4	9	16	26	−10	19	
9	Felda United U19	18	2	9	7	16	23	−7	15	
10	SSBJ U16	18	2	2	14	15	39	−24	8	

Source: FAM, Liga Malaysia
Rules for classification: 1) Points; 2) Goal difference; 3) Number of goals scored.

=== Group B ===
Pos	Team	Pld	W	D	L	GF	GA	GD	Pts	Qualification
1	Negeri Sembilan U19	18	12	3	3	31	16	+15	39	Knockout Stage
2	Melaka U19	18	10	7	1	33	14	+19	37	Knockout Stage
3	Kedah U19	18	9	7	2	25	16	+9	34	Knockout Stage
4	SSTMI U17	18	8	4	6	29	18	+11	28	Knockout Stage
5	Kelantan U19	18	8	3	7	20	18	+2	27	
6	Perak U19	18	7	4	7	18	13	+5	25	
7	Johor Darul Ta'zim IV	18	5	5	8	22	24	−2	20	
8	Sarawak U19	18	5	5	8	15	19	−4	20	
9	UiTM U19	18	3	4	11	14	34	−20	13	
10	Perlis U19	18	0	4	14	8	43	−35	4	

Source: FAM, Liga Malaysia
Rules for classification: 1) Points; 2) Goal difference; 3) Number of goals scored.

== Result table ==
=== Group A ===
Home \ Away	FEL	KLU	PAH	PKNP	PKNS	PEN	SAB	SEL	SSBJ	TER
Felda United U19	—	1–2	1–2	1–1	0–1	0–2	1–2	0–1	2–2	2–2
Kuala Lumpur U19	1–1	—	0–2	1–2	1–2	0–0	1–0	3–1	5–2	0–0
Pahang U19	2–2	0–1	—	0–3	2–3	1–2	1–1	1–0	1–0	0–2
PKNP U19	0–0	0–0	0–0	—	1–1	1–0	1–1	3–1	2–1	0–1
PKNS U19	3–0	1–2	1–1	0–0	—	0–1	2–0	1–3	3–1	0–2
Pulau Pinang U19	0–1	0–2	0–1	2–1	2–1	—	1–3	1–2	2–1	0–1
Sabah U19	1–1	2–1	3–0	0–1	1–1	3–2	—	1–4	3–0	0–0
Selangor U19	0–0	2–2	2–1	2–1	0–0	0–0	0–1	—	1–0	1–3
SSBJ U16	0–2	0–1	2–1	2–2	0–1	1–3	1–4	2–1	—	0–2
Terengganu IV	1–1	1–0	3–0	1–0	1–1	5–0	3–1	3–0	3–0	—

Source: FAM
Legend: Blue = home team win; Yellow = draw; Red = away team win.

=== Group B ===
Home \ Away	JDT	KED	KEL	MEL	NSE	PRK	PER	SAR	SST	UiTM
Johor DT IV	—	0–1	4–0	0–2	1–2	2–3	3–0	1–1	2–1	2–1
Kedah U19	1–1	—	3–1	0–0	1–1	0–1	1–0	2–2	2–1	2–0
Kelantan U19	3–0	2–0	—	2–1	0–0	0–2	5–0	1–0	1–2	2–0
Melaka U19	1–1	1–1	1–1	—	3–1	3–2	2–0	2–1	1–1	5–1
Negeri Sembilan U19	2–0	2–2	1–0	1–3	—	1–0	4–0	2–0	1–3	1–0
Perak U19	1–0	0–1	0–1	0–0	0–1	—	2–0	0–1	1–0	4–0
Perlis U19	1–1	1–2	0–1	0–3	1–3	2–2	—	1–3	0–0	0–1
Sarawak U19	0–0	1–1	2–0	1–2	0–1	1–0	1–0	—		0–2
SSTMI U17	1–0	0–2	2–0	0–2	2–3	0–0	8–1	2–0	—	3–1
UiTM U19	3–4	2–3	0–0	1–1	0–4	0–0	1–1	1–0	0–2	—

Source: FAM
Legend: Blue = home team win; Yellow = draw; Red = away team win.

== Knock-out stage ==
=== Bracket ===
Quarter-finals
1	Melaka U19	1	2	3
8	Kuala Lumpur	0	2	2
4	Terengganu IV	4	4	8
5	SSTMI U17	0	1	1
2	Sabah U19	2	1	3
7	Kedah U19	4	0	4
3	Negeri Sembilan U19	0	0	0
6	PKNS U19	0	1	1

Semi-Finals
Melaka U19	2	1	3
Terengganu IV	1	3	4
Kedah U19	0	0	0
PKNS U19	0	2	2

Final
Terengganu IV	1
PKNS U19	2

=== Quarterfinals ===
Team 1	Agg.	Team 2	1st leg	2nd leg
Melaka U19	3–2	Kuala Lumpur U19	1–0	2–2
Terengganu IV	8–1	SSTMI U17	4–0	4–1
Sabah U19	3–4	Kedah U19	2–4	1–0
Negeri Sembilan U19	0–1	PKNS U19	0–0	0–1

5 August 2018
16:45 UTC+8

Kuala Lumpur U19	0–1	Melaka U19

KLFA Stadium
9 August 2018
16:15 UTC+8

Melaka U19	2–2	Kuala Lumpur U19

Hang Tuah Stadium

Melaka U19 won 3–2 on aggregate.

5 August 2018
16:45 UTC+8

SSTMI U17	0–4	Terengganu IV

Padang B SSTMI
9 August 2018
16:15 UTC+8

Terengganu IV	4–1	SSTMI U17

Sultan Mizan Zainal Abidin Stadium

Terengganu IV won 8–1 on aggregate.

5 August 2018
16:45 UTC+8

Kedah U19	4–2	Sabah U19

Jitra Mini Stadium
9 August 2018
15:45 UTC+8

Sabah U19	1–0	Kedah U19

Penampang Stadium

Kedah U19 won 4–4 on aggregate.

5 August 2018
16:45 UTC+8

PKNS U19	0–0	Negeri Sembilan U19

Padang PKNS
9 August 2018
16:15 UTC+8

Negeri Sembilan U19	0–1	PKNS U19

Padang Merdeka

PKNS U19 won 1–0 on aggregate.

=== Semifinals ===
Team 1	Agg.	Team 2	1st leg	2nd leg
Melaka U19	3–4	Terengganu IV	2–1	1–3
Kedah U19	0–2	PKNS U19	0–0	0–2

15 August 2018
16:45 UTC+8

Melaka U19	2–1	Terengganu IV

Hang Tuah Stadium
19 August 2018
16:15 UTC+8

Terengganu IV	3–1	Melaka U19

Sultan Mizan Zainal Abidin Stadium

Terengganu IV won 4–3 on aggregate.

15 August 2018
16:45 UTC+8

Kedah U19	0–0	PKNS U19

Jitra Mini Stadium
19 August 2018
16:15 UTC+8

PKNS U19	2–0	Kedah U19

Padang PKNS

PKNS won 2–0 on aggregate.

=== Final ===
26 August 2018
20:45 UTC+8

Terengganu IV	1–2	PKNS U19
Tuan Ahmad Muqris 52'		Muhammad Asraff Alifuddin 45', 68'

KLFA Stadium

== Champions ==
Champions

== See also ==
- 2018 Malaysia Super League
- 2018 Malaysia Premier League
- 2018 Malaysia FAM Cup
- 2018 Malaysia FA Cup
- 2018 Piala Presiden
