= 2017 Piala Belia =

2017 Malaysia Youth Cup

Tournament details
- Country: Malaysia
- Teams: 19

Final positions
- Champions: Kedah U19

Tournament statistics
- Matches played: 176
- Goals scored: 433 (2.46 per match)
- All statistics correct as of 21 October 2017.

The 2017 Piala Belia (English: Youth Cup) is the seventh season of the Piala Belia since its establishment in 2008. The league is currently the youth level (U19) football league in Malaysia. Bukit Jalil Sports School are the defending champions.

== Teams ==
The following teams will be participate in the 2017 Piala Belia. In order by the number given by FAM:-

- Johor Darul Ta'zim IV
- Kedah U19
- Kelantan U19
- (Malaysia) Felda United U19
- Kuala Lumpur U19
- (Malacca) Melaka United U19
- Negeri Sembilan U19
- Pahang U19
- Perak U19
- Perlis U19
- Penang U19
- Sabah U19
- Sarawak U19
- (Malaysia) Sekolah Sukan Tunku Mahkota Ismail U17
- (Malaysia) Sekolah Sukan Tunku Mahkota Ismail U16
- Sekolah Sukan Malaysia Pahang
- (Selangor) PKNS U19
- Selangor U19
- Terengganu U19

== Team summaries ==
=== Personnel and kits ===
Note: Flags indicate national team as has been defined under FIFA eligibility rules. Players and Managers may hold more than one non-FIFA nationality.

Team	Coach	Captain	Kit	Shirt Sponsor
Felda United U19	(Malaysia) Azhar Abdul Rahman	(Malaysia) Zainal Abidin Jamil	FBT	FELDA
SSTMI U17	(Malaysia) M. Kaviarasu	(Malaysia)		
SSTMI U16	(Malaysia) Richard Scully	(Malaysia)		
SSMP	(Malaysia) P. Somasundram	(Malaysia)	Kappa	SSMP
Johor Darul Ta'zim IV	(Malaysia) Isz Mohd Shahrom Idris	(Malaysia) Mohd Faiz Mohd Nasir	Nike	Forest City
Kedah U19	(Malaysia) Mohamed Ramlee	(Malaysia)	Al-Ikhsan	Bina Darulaman Berhad
Kelantan U19	(Malaysia) Sazami Shafi'i	(Malaysia) Fikri Che Soh	HORC	
Kuala Lumpur U19	(Malaysia) Mohd Suhaimi Ismail	(Malaysia)		
Melaka U19	(Malaysia) Mohd Noor Derus	(Malaysia)		
Negeri Sembilan U19	(Malaysia) Mohd Shafiq Jonny	(Malaysia)		
Pahang U19	(Malaysia) Muhd Fahim Kow Abdullah	(Malaysia)		
Perak U19	(Malaysia) Shahril Nizam Khalil	(Malaysia)		
Perlis U19	(Malaysia) Azamri Zali	(Malaysia)		
Penang U19	(Malaysia) Noraffendi Taib	(Malaysia)		
Sabah U19	(Malaysia) Awang Sabtu Jamil	(Malaysia)		
Sarawak U19	(Malaysia) Safri Amit	(Malaysia) Shaiful Wazizi Mohd		
PKNS U19	(Malaysia) Azrin Mohamed	(Malaysia)		
Selangor U19	(Malaysia) V. Yogeswaran	(Malaysia)		
Terengganu U19	(Malaysia) Subri Sulong	(Malaysia)	Kobert	Chicken Cottage

== League table ==
=== Group A ===
Pos	Team	Pld	W	D	L	GF	GA	GD	Pts	Qualification or relegation
1	Sekolah Sukan Malaysia Pahang U17	18	10	4	4	41	20	+21	34	Advance to Knockout Stage
2	Kedah U19	18	9	4	5	24	19	+5	31	Advance to Knockout Stage
3	Sekolah Sukan Tunku Mahkota Ismail U17	18	9	3	6	29	28	+1	30	Advance to Knockout Stage
4	Terengganu U19	18	7	8	3	24	18	+6	29	Advance to Knockout Stage
5	Sarawak U19	18	7	7	4	22	14	+8	28	
6	PKNS U19	18	7	4	7	21	20	+1	25	
7	Kelantan U19	18	8	1	9	18	21	−3	25	
8	Penang U19	18	5	4	9	20	26	−6	19	
9	Johor Darul Ta'zim IV	18	3	9	6	12	22	−10	18	
10	Pahang U19	18	1	4	13	11	34	−23	7	

Updated to match(es) played on 30 July 2017. Source: FAM, Liga Malaysia
Rules for classification: 1) Points; 2) Goal difference; 3) Number of goals scored.

=== Group B ===
Pos	Team	Pld	W	D	L	GF	GA	GD	Pts	Qualification or relegation
1	Felda United U19	16	8	3	5	20	13	+7	27	Advance to Knockout Stage
2	Kuala Lumpur U19	16	8	3	5	17	12	+5	27	Advance to Knockout Stage
3	Perak U19	16	8	2	6	22	19	+3	26	Advance to Knockout Stage
4	Selangor U19	16	8	2	6	24	22	+2	26	Advance to Knockout Stage
5	Sabah U19	16	6	6	4	20	15	+5	24	
6	Sekolah Sukan Tunku Mahkota Ismail U16	16	7	0	9	24	27	−3	21	
7	Negeri Sembilan U19	16	6	2	8	21	21	0	20	
8	Melaka U19	16	6	1	9	11	23	−12	19	
9	Perlis U19	16	4	3	9	15	22	−7	15	

Updated to match(es) played on 30 July 2017. Source: FAM, Liga Malaysia
Rules for classification: 1) Points; 2) Goal difference; 3) Number of goals scored.

== Result table ==
=== Group A ===
Home \ Away	JDT	KED	KEL	PHG	PEN	PKN	SWK	SSM	SST	TRG
JDT IV		0–0	1–1	1–0	2–2	0–0	0–0	2–5	0–3	1–1
Kedah U19	1–0		3–0	2–0	2–1	0–4	3–2	2–0	1–2	0–0
Kelantan U19	1–0	2–0		2–1	1–0	1–3	1–0	0–2	2–4	0–1
Pahang U19	0–2	0–3	0–3		0–1	3–2	1–1	0–1	1–1	2–2
Pulau Pinang U19	2–1	0–1	1–0	2–0		1–1	2–4	2–2	3–0	0–2
PKNS U19	0–0	1–2	1–3	3–0	1–0		0–1	1–0	1–0	0–0
Sarawak U19	0–0	1–1	1–0	2–1	1–0	1–0		1–1	5–0	0–0
SSMP U17	5–0	2–1	0–1	3–0	6–2	4–0	0–0		5–3	2–3
SSTMI U17	1–2	2–0	2–0	1–0	1–1	1–2	2–1	1–1		2–1
Terengganu U19	0–0	2–2	1–0	2–2	1–0	3–1	2–1	1–2	2–3	

Updated to match(es) played on 30 July 2017. Source: Result
Legend: Blue = home team win; Yellow = draw; Red = away team win.

=== Group B ===
Home \ Away	FEL	KLU	MEL	NSE	PRK	PER	SAB	SEL	SST
Felda U19		2–2	0–1	1–0	3–0	2–0	1–3	0–1	4–1
KL U19	0–1		0–1	3–1	1–0	1–0	1–1	2–0	1–2
Melaka U19	0–1	0–1		0–1	0–3	1–1	0–1	2–1	0–4
NS U19	0–1	2–1	1–2		0–1	3–0	1–1	1–1	5–1
Perak U19	2–1	0–0	1–2	2–1		2–1	0–1	3–1	0–1
Perlis U19	1–0	0–1	1–0	4–0	0–2		2–2	1–2	2–0
Sabah U19	0–0	1–0	2–0	0–1	2–2	1–1		1–2	2–0
Selangor U19	1–1	0–1	1–2	1–3	4–2	2–1	2–1		3–0
SSTMI U16	1–2	1–2	4–0	2–1	1–2	3–0	2–1	1–2	

Updated to match(es) played on 30 July 2017. Source: Result
Legend: Blue = home team win; Yellow = draw; Red = away team win.

== Knock-out stage ==
=== Bracket ===
Quarter-finals
Selangor U19	0	1	1
(Malaysia) SSMP	2	0	2
(Malaysia) SSTMI U17	3	1	4
Kuala Lumpur U19	1	1	2
Terengganu U19	3	0	3
(Kuala Lumpur) Felda United U19	1	1	2
Perak U19	1	0	1
Kedah U19	1	2	3

Semi-finals
(Malaysia) SSMP	2	5	7
(Malaysia) SSTMI U17	0	0	0
Terengganu U19	1	2	3
Kedah U19	0	3	3

Final
(Malaysia) SSMP	3	0	3
Kedah U19	2	1	3

=== Quarterfinals ===
The first legs were played on 20 September, and the second legs were played on 25 September 2017.

Team 1	Agg.	Team 2	1st leg	2nd leg
Selangor U19	1–2	(Malaysia) SSMP U17	0–2	1–0
SSTMI U17 (Malaysia)	4–2	Kuala Lumpur U19	3–1	1–1
Terengganu U19	3–2	(Kuala Lumpur) Felda United U19	3–1	0–1
Perak U19	1–3	Kedah U19	1–1	0–2

First Leg

20 September 2017
16:45 UTC+8

Selangor U19	0–2	(Malaysia) SSMP U17
		Noramirul Awang 4'; Muhammad Alif Safwan 8'

MP Sepang Mini Stadium

Second Leg

25 September 2017
16:15 UTC+8

SSMP U17 (Malaysia)	0–1	Selangor U19
		Muhamad Aidil Haziq 88'

SSMP Mini Stadium

SSMP U17 won 2–1 on aggregate.

First Leg

20 September 2017
16:45 UTC+8

SSTMI U17 (Malaysia)	3–1	Kuala Lumpur U19
Muhammad Syahmi Zamri 64', 73', 87'		Faizal Hafiq Omar 31'

Padang 'B' SSTMI

Second Leg

25 September 2017
16:15 UTC+8

Kuala Lumpur U19	1–1	(Malaysia) SSTMI U17
Izzuddin Mohd Roslan 23'		Mohd Afiq Ridza 90+1'

UPM Mini Stadium

SSTMI U17 won 4–2 on aggregate.

First Leg

20 September 2017
16:45 UTC+8

Terengganu U19	3–1	(Kuala Lumpur) Felda United U19
Abdul Halim Hamzah 19'; Haziq Fauzi 39'; Amirul Syazwan 81'		Fikri Abdul Rahim 75'

Sultan Mizan Zainal Abidin Stadium

Second Leg

25 September 2017
16:15 UTC+8

Felda United U19 (Kuala Lumpur)	1–0	Terengganu U19
		Muhammad Nazarul Nazarith 75'

USIM Mini Stadium

Terengganu U19 won 3–2 on aggregate.

First Leg

20 September 2017
16:45 UTC+8

Perak U19	1 – 1	Kedah U19
Shafaiq Abdul Malek 90+3'		Mohd Ashraf Sobri 75'

UPSI Mini Stadium

Second Leg

25 September 2017
16:15 UTC+8

Kedah U19	2–0	Perak U19
Mohd Khairuddin Salleh 45+1', 85'

UUM Mini Stadium

Kedah U19 won 3–1 on aggregate.

=== Semifinals ===
The first legs will be played on 30 September, and the second legs will be played on 5 October 2017.

Team 1	Agg.	Team 2	1st leg	2nd leg
SSMP U17 (Malaysia)	7 –0	(Malaysia) SSTMI U17	2–0	5–0
Terengganu U19	3– 3(a)	Kedah U19	1–0	2–3

First Leg

30 September 2017
16:45 UTC+8

(Malaysia) SSTMI U17	0–2	SSMP U17 (Malaysia)
		Alif Safwan Sallahuddin 42'; Arif Syaqirin Suhaimi 76(P)'

Padang 'B' SSTMI

Second Leg

5 October 2017
16:15 UTC+8

(Malaysia) SSMP U17	5–0	SSTMI U17 (Malaysia)
Noramirul Awang 10'; Ahmad Idham Ahmad Nizam 36' (o.g.); Nizaruddin Jazi 45', 46'; Ikwan Yazek 90'

SSMP Mini Stadium

SSMP won 7–0 on aggregate.

First Leg

30 September 2017
16:45 UTC+8

Kedah U19	0–1	Terengganu U19
		Isa Raman 38'

UUM Mini Stadium

Second Leg

5 October 2017
16:15 UTC+8

Terengganu U19	2–3	Kedah U19
Syaiful Hakim Shahrul 27' (pen.); Abdul Halim Hamzah 66'		Amirul Azwan 13', 41'; Asnawi Sukarnain 16'

Sultan Mizan Zainal Abidin Stadium

3–3 on aggregate. Kedah won on away goals.

== Final ==
Team 1	Agg.	Team 2	1st leg	2nd leg
SSMP U17 (Malaysia)	3–3 (a)	Kedah U19	3–2	0–1

First Leg

11 October 2017
20:45 UTC+8

SSMP U17 (Malaysia)	3–2	Kedah U19
Noramirul Awang 5'; Nizarruddin Jazi 20'; Arif Syaqirin Suhaimi 25'		Khairuddin Salleh 27'; Akmal Azmi 79'

UiTM Stadium

Second Leg

16 October 2017
20:45 UTC+8

Kedah U19	1–0	(Malaysia) SSMP U17
Asnawi Sonkurnain 53'

Darul Aman Stadium

3–3 on aggregate. Kedah won on away goals.

== Champions ==
Champions
Kedah U19

== Season statistics ==
=== Scoring ===
As of 2 April 2017

Rank	Player	Team	Goals
1	Haziq Fikri Haszaime	Negeri Sembilan U19	7
2	Alif Safwan Sallahuddin	(Pahang) SSMP U17	6
3	Akmal Azmi	Kedah U19	4
3	Hazim Zaid	(Johor) SSTMI U16	4

== See also ==
- 2017 Liga Super
- 2017 Liga Premier
- 2017 Malaysia FAM League
- 2017 Piala FA
- 2017 Piala Presiden
