= 2019 Piala Belia =

2019 Piala Belia 2019
2019 Malaysia Youth Cup

Tournament details
- Country: Malaysia
- Dates: 20 February – 28 September
- Teams: 21

Final positions
- Champions: Terengganu IV
- Runners-up: PKNS U19

Tournament statistics
- Matches played: 214
- Goals scored: 549 (2.57 per match)
- All statistics correct as of 28 September 2019.

The 2019 Piala Belia (transl. Youth Cup) was the ninth season of the Piala Belia since its establishment in 2008. The league is currently the youth level (U19) football league in Malaysia. PKNS U19 are the defending champions. 21 teams competed in this season. All teams were drawn into two different groups, and plays in a maximum of 20 home-and-away matches. Top four teams after the completion of group stage matches progressed to knockout stage.

== Teams ==
The following teams were participating in the 2019 Piala Belia.

Group A

- Felda United U19
- Kelantan U19
- Kuala Lumpur U19
- Melaka U19
- PJ City U19
- PKNP U19
- PKNS U19
- Selangor United U19
- SSBJ U17
- UiTM U19
- ~~Perlis U19~~

Group B

- AMD U16
- Johor Darul Ta'zim IV
- Kedah U19
- Negeri Sembilan U19
- Pahang U19
- Perak U19
- Pulau Pinang U19
- Sabah U19
- Sarawak U19
- Selangor U19
- Terengganu IV

== League table ==
=== Group A ===
Pos	Team	Pld	W	D	L	GF	GA	GD	Pts	Qualification
1	PKNS U19	18	10	5	3	29	11	+18	35	Knockout Stage
2	PJ City U19	18	8	8	2	23	16	+7	32	Knockout Stage
3	UiTM U19	18	9	3	6	26	17	+9	30	Knockout Stage
4	Kelantan U19	18	8	5	5	24	17	+7	29	Knockout Stage
5	PKNP U19	18	9	2	7	23	23	0	29	
6	Kuala Lumpur U19	18	6	7	5	24	18	+6	25	
7	Felda United U19	18	6	4	8	22	30	−8	22	
8	SSBJ U17	18	3	7	8	17	25	−8	16	
9	Selangor United U19	18	3	5	10	9	24	−15	14	
10	Melaka U19	18	2	6	10	15	31	−16	12	

Updated to match(es) played on 28 July 2019. Source: FAM, Liga Malaysia
Rules for classification: 1) Points; 2) Goal difference; 3) Number of goals scored.

=== Group B ===
Pos	Team	Pld	W	D	L	GF	GA	GD	Pts	Qualification
1	Terengganu IV	20	17	2	1	50	8	+42	53	Knockout Stage
2	AMD U16	20	11	4	5	31	21	+10	37	Knockout Stage
3	Perak U19	20	11	3	6	31	29	+2	36	Knockout Stage
4	Selangor U19	20	10	2	8	26	20	+6	32	Knockout Stage
5	Kedah U19	20	7	7	6	26	24	+2	28	
6	Johor DT IV	20	8	4	8	32	31	+1	28	
7	Pahang U19	20	8	2	10	20	31	−11	26	
8	Negeri Sembilan U19	20	6	7	7	28	25	+3	25	
9	Pulau Pinang U19	20	6	2	12	31	38	−7	20	
10	Sarawak U19	20	3	5	12	16	38	−22	14	
11	Sabah U19	20	3	2	15	22	48	−26	11	

Updated to match(es) played on 28 July 2019. Source: FAM, Liga Malaysia
Rules for classification: 1) Points; 2) Goal difference; 3) Number of goals scored.

== Result table ==
=== Group A ===
Home \ Away	FEL	KEL	KUL	MEL	PJC	PKNP	PKNS	SEU	SSBJ	UiTM
Felda United U19	—	3–2	0–1	2–3	1–3	1–2	2–1	1–0	2–2	1–1
Kelantan U19	3–0	—	2–1	2–2	1–1	3–0	2–0	0–1	2–1	1–0
Kuala Lumpur U19	3–0	3–0	—	2–0	0–1	2–0	0–0	0–3	4–0	1–1
Melaka U19	0–2	1–4	1–1	—	1–1	0–2	1–1	0–0	1–2	0–3
PJ City U19	1–1	0–0	1–1	1–0	—	2–1	1–1	1–0	1–1	1–2
PKNP U19	0–3	2–0	1–1	2–1	2–4	—	1–2	2–0	2–1	2–0
PKNS U19	1–0	0–0	2–0	3–1	2–0	1–0	—	3–0	2–0	1–2
Selangor United U19	1–2	1–1	1–1	0–0	0–1	1–2	0–6	—	0–3	0–1
SSBJ U17	1–1	0–1	1–1	1–3	1–1	1–1	0–0	0–1	—	2–1
UiTM U19	5–0	1–0	4–2	2–0	1–2	0–1	1–3	0–0	1–0	—

Updated to match(es) played on 28 July 2019. Source: FAM
Legend: Blue = home team win; Yellow = draw; Red = away team win.

=== Group B ===
Home \ Away	AMD	JDT	KED	NSE	PAH	PRK	PEN	SAB	SAR	SEL	TER
AMD U16	—	1–2	1–1	1–0	2–0	2–2	2–1	3–1	2–0	2–0	0–1
Johor DT IV	0–1	—	1–2	1–2	2–2	1–1	3–2	3–1	2–2	2–1	1–2
Kedah U19	0–0	3–3	—	0–0	1–0	0–2	1–2	1–1	2–0	1–2	1–3
Negeri Sembilan U19	4–1	0–1	0–1	—	1–1	1–0	2–2	3–1	4–1	2–2	0–1
Pahang U19	2–5	2–1	2–1	2–1	—	1–2	2–1	0–1	1–0	0–3	0–3
Perak U19	1–1	2–1	0–2	1–3	2–0	—	2–0	4–1	3–0	1–0	0–3
Pulau Pinang U19	1–2	0–1	1–2	1–1	4–1	4–1	—	1–0	4–0	1–2	1–4
Sabah U19	1–2	1–5	0–4	2–1	0–2	3–4	7–1	—	0–1	1–2	0–6
Sarawak U19	2–1	3–0	2–2	2–2	0–1	0–1	1–3	0–0	—	0–0	0–3
Selangor U19	0–1	0–2	3–0	3–0	0–1	1–2	2–1	2–1	2–1	—	0–1
Terengganu IV	2–1	3–0	1–1	1–1	1–0	5–0	2–0	3–0	5–1	0–1	—

Updated to match(es) played on 28 July 2019. Source: FAM
Legend: Blue = home team win; Yellow = draw; Red = away team win.

== Knock-out stage ==
=== Bracket ===
Quarter-finals
UiTM U19	1	0	1
AMD U16	0	0	0
Selangor U19	0	1	1(2)
PKNS U19 (p)	1	0	1(4)
Perak U19	4	1	5
PJ City U19	0	2	2
Kelantan U19	0	1	1
Terengganu IV	2	2	4

Semi-Finals
UiTM U19	0	0	0
PKNS U19	0	2	2
Perak U19	0	0	0
Terengganu IV	2	4	6

Final
PKNS U19	0	0	0
Terengganu IV	0	1	1

== See also ==
- 2019 Piala Presiden
