= 2015 Piala Presiden =

2015 Piala Presiden may refer to either:

- 2015 Indonesia President's Cup
- 2015 Piala Presiden (Malaysia)
