= 2008 Piala Belia =

2008 Malaysia Youth Cup

Tournament details
- Country: Malaysia

Final positions
- Champions: Kelantan
- Runner-up: (Malaysia) SSBJ

The 2008 Piala Belia (transl. Youth Cup) was the first edition of the Piala Belia. The league is currently the youth level (U19) football league in Malaysia.

== Final ==
10 August 2008
16:45 UTC+8

| Kelantan | 3–1 (a.e.t.) | (Malaysia) SSBJ |
|---|---|---|
| Farhan Yaakub 9'; Md Zulhariz 91'; Hazeman Karim 114' | | Saiful Ridzuan 60' |

Sultan Muhammad IV Stadium

== Champions ==
Champions
Kelantan
1st Title
