= 2022 Piala Belia =

2022 Malaysia Youth Cup

Tournament details
- Country: Malaysia
- Dates: 23 February 2022 – 26 August 2022
- Teams: 18

Final positions
- Champions: Selangor U19
- Runners-up: Sri Pahang U19

Tournament statistics
- Matches played: 206
- Goals scored: 242 (1.17 per match)
- All statistics correct as of 27 August 2022.

The 2022 Piala Belia (transl. Youth Cup) was the 11th season of the Piala Belia since its establishment in 2008. The league is currently the youth level (U19) football league in Malaysia. Terengganu IV are the defending champions. 18 teams competed in this season. All teams were drawn into three different groups. The top two teams from each groups and the two best third-place teams after the completion of group stage matches progressed to knockout stage.

== Teams ==
The following teams were participating in the 2022 Piala Belia.

Group A	Group B	Group C
Terengganu IV	Selangor F.C. U19	Sri Pahang U19
Kelantan United U19	Johor Darul Ta'zim IV	Petaling Jaya City U19
Kedah Darul Aman U19	AMD U16	Sabah U19
Penang U19	Kuala Lumpur City U19	PDRM U19
Perlis United U19	Negeri Sembilan U19	Kuching City U19
	UiTM U19	Sarawak United U19
	Melaka United U19	

The 18 teams are divided into three groups, namely Group A (North Zone) consisting of 5 teams from the North and East Zone, Group B (South Zone) with 7 teams from the South, East and Central Zone while Group C (Central Zone) with 6 teams from the Zone Central, Eastern and Borneo.

== Group stage ==
The group level competition will take place home and away from 23 February to 17 July 2022 with the eight best teams which are the top two teams in each group and the two best third place teams in the group will qualify for the Quarter-finals.

=== Group A ===
Pos	Team	Pld	W	D	L	GF	GA	GD	Pts	Qualification
1	Terengganu IV	8	5	1	2	8	4	+4	16	Advance to Knockout Stage
2	Kelantan United U19	8	3	5	0	6	2	+4	14	Advance to Knockout Stage
3	Kedah Darul Aman U19	8	2	3	3	5	5	0	9	Advance to Knockout Stage
4	Penang U19	8	2	2	4	4	8	−4	8	
5	Perlis United U19	8	1	3	4	6	10	−4	6	

Updated to match(es) played on 1 August 2022. Source: https://www.fam.org.my/piala-belia-2022
Rules for classification: 1) Points; 2) Goal difference; 3) Number of goals scored.

==== Group B ====
Pos	Team	Pld	W	D	L	GF	GA	GD	Pts	Qualification
1	Selangor U19	12	9	2	1	19	5	+14	29	Advance to Knockout Stage
2	Johor Darul Ta'zim IV	12	8	0	4	23	13	+10	24	Advance to Knockout Stage
3	AMD U16	12	6	1	5	18	18	0	19	Advance to Knockout Stage
4	Kuala Lumpur City U19	12	5	1	6	19	17	+2	16	
5	Negeri Sembilan U19	12	5	1	6	13	12	+1	16	
6	UiTM U19	12	4	1	7	9	22	−13	13	
7	Melaka United U19	12	1	2	9	6	20	−14	5	

Updated to match(es) played on 1 August 2022. Source: https://www.fam.org.my/piala-belia-2022
Rules for classification: 1) Points; 2) Goal difference; 3) Number of goals scored.

===== Group C =====
Pos	Team	Pld	W	D	L	GF	GA	GD	Pts	Qualification
1	Sri Pahang U19	10	5	5	0	17	8	+9	20	Advance to Knockout Stage
2	Petaling Jaya City U19	10	6	2	2	12	9	+3	20	Advance to Knockout Stage
3	Sabah U19	10	2	4	4	7	8	−1	10	
4	PDRM U19	10	2	4	4	10	12	−2	10	
5	Kuching City U19	10	2	4	4	8	12	−4	10	
6	Sarawak United U19	10	2	3	5	11	16	−5	9	

Updated to match(es) played on 1 August 2022. Source: https://www.fam.org.my/piala-belia-2022
Rules for classification: 1) Points; 2) Goal difference; 3) Number of goals scored.

=== Ranking of third-place teams ===
The top two third-place teams will advance to knockout stage.

Pos	Grp	Team	Pld	W	D	L	GF	GA	GD	Pts	Qualification
1	A	Kedah Darul Aman U19	8	2	3	3	5	5	0	9	Advance to Knockout Stage
2	B	AMD U16	8	3	0	5	9	16	−7	9	Advance to Knockout Stage
3	C	Sabah U19	8	1	4	3	4	6	−2	7	

Updated to match(es) played on unknown. Source:
Rules for classification: 1) Points; 2) Goal difference; 3) Number of goals scored.

== Knockout stage ==
The Quarter-finals (25 and 31 July 2022), Semi-finals (7 and 14 August 2022) and final (19 and 26 August 2022) will take place home and away.

=== Bracket ===
Quarter-finals
AMD U16	3	0	3
Selangor U19	1	7	8
Johor DT IV	2	0	2
PJ City U19	1	2	3
Kedah Darul Aman U19	1	1	2
Terengganu IV	1	3	4
Kelantan United U19	2	0	2
Sri Pahang U19 (a)	1	1	2

Semi-finals
Selangor U19	0	2	2
PJ City U19	0	0	0
Terengganu IV	1	3	4
Sri Pahang U19	5	1	6

Final
Selangor U19	1	1	2
Sri Pahang U19	0	1	1

== Top goalscorers ==
A total of 130 players scored goals.

Rank	Player	Club	Goals
1	Khairil Zain	Selangor U19	12
2	Dainei Mat Disa	AMD U16	7
2	Haqimi Rosli	Kuala Lumpur City U19	7
2	Harry Danish	Selangor U19	7
5	Haiqal Khairuddin	Johor Darul Ta'zim IV	6
5	Danish Tajuddin	Negeri Sembilan U19	6
5	Khafii Abdul Majid	Sri Pahang U19	6
8	Alif Irfan	Sri Pahang U19	5
8	Amirul Haikal	Sri Pahang U19	5
10	Adam Mikaeel	AMD U16	4
10	Irfan Shahkimi	Johor Darul Ta'zim IV	4
10	Abdul Mubin	Petaling Jaya U19	4
10	Amirul Haziq	Selangor U19	4
10	Amirul Haima	Terengganu IV	4
15	5 players		3
20	32 players		2
51	79 players		1

== See also ==
- Piala Belia
- Piala Presiden
