= 2015 Piala Belia =

Piala Belia
- Season: 2015
- Champions: Selangor
- Matches played: 101
- Goals scored: 272 (2.69 per match)

The 2015 Piala Belia (English: Youth Cup) was the fifth season of the Piala Belia since its establishment in 2008. The league involve the youth level (Under-19) football player of Malaysian football. Selangor became the champions of the 2015 Piala Belia.

== Teams ==
The following teams contested in the 2015 Piala Belia. In order by the number given by Football Association of Malaysia (FAM):-

- Perlis
- Kuala Lumpur
- Penang
- (Malacca) Melaka
- Pahang
- Kedah
- Johor
- Negeri Sembilan
- Selangor
- Malaysia Pahang Sports School
- Terengganu
- Sarawak
- Kelantan
- Perak
- Sabah

== Team summaries ==
=== Personnel and kits ===
Note: Flags indicate national team as has been defined under FIFA eligibility rules. Players and Managers may hold more than one non-FIFA nationality.

Team	Coach	Captain	Kit Manufacturer	Shirt Sponsor
Malaysia Pahang Sports School	(Malaysia) Khalid Shahdan	(Malaysia)		
Johor	(Malaysia) Yazid Abdul Karim	(Malaysia)		
Kedah	(Malaysia) Roshidi Shaari	(Malaysia)		
Kelantan	(Malaysia) Tengku Hazman Raja Hassan	(Malaysia) Azwan Aripin		
Kuala Lumpur	(Malaysia) Azizan Idris	(Malaysia)		
Malacca	(Malaysia) G. Selvamohan	(Malaysia)		
Negeri Sembilan	(Malaysia) Zainuddin Hussein	(Malaysia)		
Pahang	(Malaysia) Shahrulnizam Sahat	(Malaysia)		
Perak	(Malaysia) Khairul Azuar Kamiron	(Malaysia)		
Perlis	(Malaysia) Suhairi Abdul Karim	(Malaysia)		
Penang	(Malaysia) Noraffendi Taib	(Malaysia)		
Sabah	(Malaysia) Mohd Razali Zinin	(Malaysia)		
Sarawak	(Bosnia and Herzegovina) Fuad Grbesic	(Malaysia)		
Selangor	(Malaysia) Noor Zaidi Rohmat	(Malaysia)		
Terengganu	(Malaysia) Zakari Alias	(Malaysia)		

== League table ==
=== League table ===
Pos	Team	Pld	W	D	L	GF	GA	GD	Pts
1	Selangor (C)	14	12	1	1	33	5	+28	37
2	(Pahang) SSMP	14	9	4	1	17	3	+14	31
3	Kedah	14	8	5	1	19	8	+11	29
4	Kelantan	14	7	4	3	21	14	+7	25
5	Penang	14	6	3	5	22	17	+5	21
6	Malacca	14	6	3	5	23	21	+2	21
7	Perak	14	6	2	6	19	19	0	20
8	Johor	14	6	2	6	23	25	−2	20
9	Perlis	14	6	1	7	28	27	+1	19
10	Kuala Lumpur	14	5	3	6	13	13	0	18
11	Sarawak	14	3	3	8	6	18	−12	12
12	Sabah	14	4	0	10	13	28	−15	12
13	Negeri Sembilan	14	2	4	8	11	19	−8	10
14	Terengganu	14	2	4	8	10	24	−14	10
15	Pahang	14	2	3	9	14	30	−16	9

Updated to match(es) played on 28 April 2015. Source: MFL Official Site
Rules for classification: 1) points; 2) goal difference; 3) number of goals scored.
(C) Champions

== Fixtures and results ==
Fixtures and Results of the Malaysia Piala Belia 2015 season.

Source: FAM

=== Week 1 ===
8 February 2015 #1	Kuala Lumpur	2–0	Penang	UKM Bangi Stadium, Bangi, Selangor
16:45 UTC+8	Salihin Jamil 59'; Raaj Baarathy 90+1'	Report		Attendance: 50; Referee: Hilary Mawat

8 February 2015 #2	Perlis	2–1	Negeri Sembilan	Tuanku Syed Putra Stadium, Kangar, Perlis
16:45 UTC+8	Zulkifli Zakaria 29', 60'	Report	Fauzi Abdul Latif 40'	Attendance: 300; Referee: Mohd Zaidi Zakariya

8 February 2015 #3	Kelantan	0–4	Selangor	University Sains Malaysia Mini Stadium, Kubang Kerian, Kelantan
16:45 UTC+8		Report	Mohd Faizuddin Mohd Abidin 16,19'; Mohd Amirul Syafieq Muhd Isa Sham 47'; Mohamad Afiq Mohd Azam 64'	Attendance: 200; Referee: Mat Zan Abdul Wahab

8 February 2015 #5	Melaka (Malacca)	3–1	Sabah	Hang Tuah Stadium, Malacca
16:45 UTC+8	Muhammad Gaddafi 46', 68'; Hazim Razali 90+2'	Report	Mohd Ramzainee 81'	Attendance: 220; Referee: Hasman Hisam Angsari

8 February 2015 #6	Johor	3–0	Pahang	Padang Dataran Mawar Pasir Gudang, Johor
16:45 UTC+8	Shafiqee Fitri 4', 17', 65'	Report		Attendance: 300; Referee: Fitri Miskon

8 February 2015 #7	SMSP (Pahang)	0–0	Kedah	SSMP Mini Stadium, Gambang, Pahang
16:45 UTC+8		Report		Attendance: 200; Referee: Muhammad Azwan

== Champions ==
Champions
Selangor
2nd title

== See also ==
- 2015 Malaysia Super League
- 2015 Malaysia Premier League
- 2015 Malaysia FA Cup
- 2015 Malaysia President's Cup
