= 2024–25 Piala Belia =

Football league in Malaysia

Malaysia Youth Cup

Tournament details
- Country: Malaysia
- Dates: 27 April 2024 – 2025
- Teams: 18

Final positions
- Champions: Johor Darul Ta'zim IV
- Runners-up: Terengganu FC IV

Tournament statistics
- Matches played: 158
- Goals scored: 272 (1.72 per match)
- All statistics correct as of 22 November 2024.

The 2024–25 Piala Belia (transl. Youth Cup) is the 12th season of the Piala Belia since its establishment in 2008. It is the youth level (U-18) football league in Malaysia. Selangor U18 are the defending champions. 18 teams compete in this season. All teams were drawn into two different groups, and play a maximum of 18 home-and-away matches. Top four teams after the group stage progress to the knockout stage.

== Teams ==
The following teams were participating in the 2024–25 Piala Belia.

Group A

- Selangor FC U18
- Sabah FC U18
- Singa Muda Perlis
- Melaka FA U18
- Kelantan Darul Naim FC U18
- Kelantan FA U18
- Negeri Sembilan FC U18
- Sri Pahang FC U18
- Kuala Lumpur City U18

Group B

- Johor Darul Ta'zim IV
- Kuching City FC U18
- AMD U16
- PDRM FC U18
- MISC-Touchtronics
- Penang FC U18
- Terengganu FC IV
- Perak FC IV
- Kedah Darul Aman FC U18

== League table ==
=== Group A ===
Pos	Team	Pld	W	D	L	GF	GA	GD	Pts	Qualification
1	Selangor FC U18	16	12	2	2	41	10	+31	38	Knockout Stage
2	Kelantan FA U18	16	9	3	4	21	16	+5	30	Knockout Stage
3	Kuala Lumpur City U18	16	9	2	5	25	12	+13	29	Knockout Stage
4	Singa Muda Perlis	16	8	3	5	16	11	+5	27	Knockout Stage
5	Kelantan Darul Naim FC U18	16	7	3	6	16	22	−6	24	
6	Negeri Sembilan FC U18	16	5	5	6	20	23	−3	20	
7	Melaka FA U18	16	3	3	10	13	26	−13	12	
8	Sri Pahang FC U18	16	3	3	10	13	29	−16	12	
9	Sabah FC U18	16	2	4	10	13	29	−16	10	

Updated to match(es) played on 17 August 2024. Source: FAM
Rules for classification: 1) Points; 2) Goal difference; 3) Number of goals scored.

=== Group B ===
Pos	Team	Pld	W	D	L	GF	GA	GD	Pts	Qualification
1	Johor Darul Ta'zim IV	16	13	3	0	51	8	+43	42	Knockout Stage
2	Terengganu FC IV	16	12	2	2	51	15	+36	38	Knockout Stage
3	AMD U16	16	9	0	7	30	22	+8	27	Knockout Stage
4	Perak FC IV	16	7	5	4	20	14	+6	26	Knockout Stage
5	Kedah Darul Aman FC D	16	7	4	5	27	20	+7	25	
6	Penang FC U18	16	6	1	9	29	42	−13	19	
7	MISC-Touchtronics	16	5	1	10	20	38	−18	16	
8	PDRM FC U18	16	2	2	12	16	38	−22	8	
9	Kuching City FC U18	16	2	0	14	10	57	−47	6	

Updated to match(es) played on 17 August 2024. Source: FAM
Rules for classification: 1) Points; 2) Goal difference; 3) Number of goals scored.

== Result table ==
=== Group A ===
Home \ Away	SEL	SAB	PEL	MEL	KDN	KEL	NSE	PAH	KUL
Selangor FC U18		2–0	4–1	4–0	5–0	1–2	3–1	3–0	2–1
Sabah FC U18	1–1		0–1	1–1	3–0	0–1	1–2	2–1	0–5
Singa Muda Perlis	0–1	1–0		2–0	3–0	0–1	2–0	1–1	1–0
Melaka FA U18	2–4	2–0	0–0		1–1	3–1	1–0	1–2	0–2
Kelantan Darul Naim FC U18	0–2	3–0	1–0	1–0		1–0	0–2	0–0	1–0
Kelantan FA U18	1–1	2–1	0–1	3–1	2–2		1–1	2–1	0–2
Negeri Sembilan FC U18	0–4	3–3	0–0	1–0	3–2	1–2		5–2	1–1
Sri Pahang FC U18	0–4	1–1	0–1	2–0	1–3	0–1	1–0		0–1
Kuala Lumpur City U18	1–0	3–0	3–2	2–1	0–1	0–2	0–0	4–1	

Updated to match(es) played on 17 August 2024. Source: FAM
Legend: Blue = home team win; Yellow = draw; Red = away team win.

=== Group B ===
Home \ Away	JDT	KUC	AMD	PDRM	TOU	PEN	TER	PER	KDA
Johor Darul Ta'zim IV		6–0	2–1	3–0	6–1	3–1	3–0	1–1	3–0
Kuching City FC U18	0–6		1–2	2–1	1–3	0–4	0–6	1–0	0–2
AMD U16	0–1	3–0		2–0	2–0	2–0	1–6	1–2	2–0
PDRM FC U18	0–6	5–3	0–1		2–1	0–1	1–4	1–2	1–5
MISC-Touchtronics	1–3	1–0	1–3	3–2		1–3	0–5	0–1	3–1
Penang FC U18	1–5	3–2	0–6	3–2	2–3		2–5	1–2	3–6
Terengganu FC IV	1–1	7–0	3–1	2–1	4–0	4–2		0–2	0–0
Perak FC IV	0–1	3–0	4–2	0–0	1–1	1–1	0–2		0–0
Kedah Darul Aman FC U18	1–1	5–0	2–1	0–0	2–1	0–2	1–2	2–1	

Updated to match(es) played on 17 August 2024. Source: FAM
Legend: Blue = home team win; Yellow = draw; Red = away team win.

== Knock-out stage ==
=== Bracket ===
Quarter-finals
Singa Muda Perlis	0	0	0
Johor Darul Ta'zim IV	3	6	9
AMD U16	1	0	1(4)
Kelantan FA U18	0	1	1(2)
Kuala Lumpur City U18	0	1	1
Terengganu FC IV	2	0	2
Perak FC IV	1	1	2
Selangor FC U18	1	2	3

Semi-Finals
Johor Darul Ta'zim IV	3	2	5
AMD U16	1	1	2
Terengganu FC IV	2	1	3
Selangor FC U18	0	2	2

Final
Johor Darul Ta'zim IV	2	5	7
Terengganu FC IV	2	3	5

=== Quarter-finals ===
Team 1	Agg.	Team 2	1st leg	2nd leg
Singa Muda Perlis	0–9	Johor Darul Ta'zim IV	0–3	0–6
AMD U16	1–1(4–2)	Kelantan FA U18	1–0	0–1
Kuala Lumpur City U18	1–2	Terengganu FC IV	0–2	1–0
Perak FC IV	2–3	Selangor FC U18	1–1	1–2

First Leg

25 August 2024
20:45 UTC+8

Singa Muda Perlis	0–3	Johor Darul Ta'zim IV
	Report	Abid Safaraz 2', 69'; Qahir Dzakirin 14'

Tuanku Syed Putra Stadium , Kangar
Attendance: 2,200
Referee: Abdul Halim Ramlan

Second Leg

8 September 2024
16:15 UTC+8

Johor Darul Ta'zim IV	6–0	Singa Muda Perlis

Kulai Municipal Council Stadium, Kulai

"Johor Darul Ta'zim IV won 9–0 on aggregate."

First Leg

25 August 2024
16:45 UTC+8

AMD U16	1–0	Kelantan FA U18
Mubin Ruzir 79'	Report

AMD Football Field, Gambang
Attendance: 100
Referee: Ahmad Hafiz Mohamad

Second Leg

8 September 2024
16:15 UTC+8

Kelantan FA U18	0–1	AMD U16

Machang Mini Stadium, Machang

"1–1 on aggregate. AMD U16 won on penalty shoot-out 4–2"

First Leg

24 August 2024
20:30 UTC+8

Kuala Lumpur City U18	0–2	Terengganu IV
	Report	Miqail Zafran Zidane 38'; Iman Alif 86'

Kuala Lumpur Stadium, Cheras
Attendance: 327
Referee: Kamal Ikhwan Bin Yaacob

Second Leg

8 September 2024
16:15 UTC+8

Terengganu IV	0–1	Kuala Lumpur City U18

Sultan Mizan Zainal Abidin Stadium , Gong Badak

"Terengganu IV won 2–1 on aggregate."

First Leg

25 August 2024
16:45 UTC+8

Perak IV	1–1	Selangor U18
Ahmad Danish Mas Yuri 78'	Report	Hatif Irfan 57'

PCRC Football Field, Ipoh
Attendance: 150
Referee: Mohd Azizan Saat Ariffin

Second Leg

9 September 2024
16:15 UTC+8

Selangor U18	2–1	Perak IV

Persada PLUS Mini Stadium, Petaling Jaya

"Selangor U18 won 3–2 on aggregate."

== Semi-finals ==
=== Summary ===
The first leg will be played on 2 November 2024 and the second leg will be played on 9 November 2024.

Team 1	Agg.	Team 2	1st leg	2nd leg
AMD U16	2–5	Johor Darul Ta'zim IV	1–3	1–2
Terengganu IV	3–2	Selangor U18	2–0	1–2

=== Matches ===
First Leg

2 November 2024
16:45 UTC+8

AMD U16	1–3	Johor Darul Ta'zim IV

AMD Gambang, Kuantan

Second Leg

9 November 2024
16:15 UTC+8

Johor Darul Ta'zim IV	2–1	AMD U16

Kulai Mini Stadium, Kulai

First Leg

2 November 2024
16:45 UTC+8

Terengganu IV	2–0	Selangor U18

Sultan Ismail Nasiruddin Shah, Kuala Terengganu

Second Leg

9 November 2024
16:15 UTC+8

Selangor U18	2–1	Terengganu IV

Persada PLUS Mini Stadium, Petaling Jaya

== Final ==
Team 1	Agg.	Team 2	1st leg	2nd leg
Terengganu IV	5–7	JDT IV	2–2	3–5

16 November 2024
20:30 UTC+8

JDT IV	2–2	Terengganu IV
Qahir Dzakirin 45+4'; Alauddeen Aliff 52'	Report	Arsyad Shamsul 64'; Zafran Zidane 76'

Pasir Gudang Corporation Stadium, Johor Baharu
Attendance: 2,000
Referee: Mohamad Nawal Mohammad Zubir
23 November 2024
20:30 UTC+8

Terengganu IV	3–5	JDT IV
Iskandar Ikmal 45+2'; Iman Alif 90+4'	Report	Muhammad Daniesh 18' (pen.); Zamir Zairi 26' (pen.) 59'; Adib Ibrahim 74'; Abid Safaraz 85'

Sultan Mizan Zainal Abidin Stadium, Kuala Terengganu
Attendance: 1,000
Referee: Amirul Zamil Jamil

== Season statistics ==
=== Top goalscorers ===
As of 26 August 2024

Rank	Player	Club	Goal
1	Hatif Irfan	Selangor FC U18	16
2	Izzuddin Afif Nazarudin	AMD U16	15
3	Arsyad Shamsul Aswadi	Terengganu FC IV	14
4	Abid Safaraz Rozaidi	Johor Darul Ta'zim IV	9
4	Adam Haikal	Terengganu FC IV	9
6	Al Fahhimi Nor Azizul	Perak FC IV	8
7	Zamir Zairi	Johor Darul Ta'zim IV	7
7	Norhafis Norhadi	Kelantan FA U18	7
7	Aiman Amsyar Shaari	Selangor FC U18	7

=== Hat-trick ===
Player	Team	Against	Result	Date
Izzuddin Afif	AMD U16	Penang U18	0–6 (P)	28 April 2024
Zamir Zairi	Johor Darul Ta'zim IV	PDRM U18	0–6 (P)	8 May 2024
Norhafis Norhadi	Kelantan U18	Melaka U18	3–1 (R)	18 May 2024
Abid Safaraz	Johor Darul Ta'zim IV	MISC-Touchtronics U18	6–1 (R)	1 June 2024
Adam Haikal	Terengganu IV	PDRM U18	1–4 (P)	22 June 2024
Muhaimin Izzat	Penang U18	MISC-Touchtronics U18	1–3 (P)	23 June 2024
Ierfan Hafizan	Terengganu IV	Kuching City U18	7–0 (R)	29 June 2024

Note

^{4} Player with 4 goal
(H) Home dan (A) Away.

=== Own goals ===
Rank	Player	Team	Against	Date	Goal
1	J. Kishen	Melaka FA U18	Kelantan Darul Naim FC U18	27 April 2024	1
1	Danniesh Haqimie	Kuching City FC U18	MISC-Touchtronics	5 May 2024	1
1	Ashley Albert	Kuching City FC U18	Johor Darul Ta'zim IV	11 May 2024	1
1	Nazfarrudin Salihin	Kuching City FC U18	Johor Darul Ta'zim IV	11 May 2024	1

== See also ==
- 2024–25 Piala Presiden (Malaysia)
