= 2025–26 Piala Belia =

Football league in Malaysia

Malaysia Youth Cup

Tournament details
- Country: Malaysia
- Dates: 26 April – 1 November 2025
- Teams: 14

Final positions
- Champions: Johor Darul Ta'zim IV
- Runners-up: Selangor FC U18

Tournament statistics
- Matches played: 182
- Goals scored: 29 (0.16 per match)
- All statistics correct as of 1 November 2025.

The 2025–26 Piala Belia (Youth Cup) is the 13th season of the Piala Belia since its establishment in 2008. It is the youth level (U-18) football league in Malaysia. Johor Darul Ta'zim IV are the defending champions. 14 teams compete in this season with 26 home-and-away matches.

== Rules ==
=== Age limit ===
2025–26 Piala Belia is an amateur football competition in Malaysia for under-18 players. Since its inception in 2008, the Piala Belia has been a major tournament for under-19 players. In 2024, the format of the competition was changed with only under-18 players eligible to fill in for the tournament that.

=== Format ===
The tournament is played as follows:

- League level: The tournament follows a double round-robin league format, where each of the 14 participating teams plays 26 matches (home and away). The winner of the final (over two legs) — via aggregate score, or penalties if necessary — is crowned the Piala Presiden Champion for the season.

== Teams ==
The following teams were participating in the 2025–26 Piala Belia.

| Team | Location | Stadium |
|---|---|---|
| AMD U16 | Gambang, Pahang | Padang 10 AMD Gambang |
| AMD Future | Gambang, Pahang | Padang 10 AMD Gambang |
| Johor Darul Ta'zim IV | Kulai | Kulai Mini Stadium |
| Johor Darul Ta'zim V | Johor Bahru | Taman Ungku Tun Aminah Mini Stadium |
| Kuala Lumpur City U18 | Kuala Lumpur | UM Arena Stadium |
| Kuching City FC U18 | Kuching | Sarawak Stadium |
| Melaka FA U18 | Melaka City | Hang Tuah Stadium |
| Negeri Sembilan FC U18 | Kuala Pilah | Kuala Pilah Mini Stadium |
| PDRM FC U18 | Bukit Jelutong, Shah Alam | Sime Darby FC Training Ground |
| Penang FC III | George Town, Penang | City Stadium |
| Sabah FC III | Kota Kinabalu | Likas Stadium |
| Selangor FC U18 | Kuala Lumpur | UM Arena Stadium |
| SSTMI U17 | Kota Tinggi | SSTMI Football Field, Bandar Penawar |
| Terengganu FC U18 | Kuala Terengganu | Sultan Ismail Nasiruddin Shah Stadium |

== Personnel, kit and sponsoring ==
| Team | Head coach | Captain | Kit manufacturer | Sponsor |
|---|---|---|---|---|
| AMD U16 | (Malaysia) Kuizwan Johari | (Malaysia) Iman Irfan | N/A | N/A |
| AMD Future | (Malaysia) S. Veloo | (Malaysia) Amir Airill Kencana Zaini | N/A | N/A |
| Johor Darul Ta'zim IV | (Malaysia) Shariman Che Omar | (Malaysia) Arif Aiman Za'aba | Nike | JDT Fan Token |
| Johor Darul Ta'zim V | (Spain) Pau Valldecabres Gimeno | (Malaysia) Arayyan Hakeem Norizam | Nike | JDT Fan Token |
| Kuala Lumpur City U18 | (Malaysia) Mohd Faizal Esahar | (Malaysia) Ammar Nazrin Ahmad Najib | StarSports | N/A |
| Kuching City FC U18 | (Malaysia) Joseph Kalang Tie | (Malaysia) Yodhison Noel | StarSports | City of Unity |
| Melaka FA U18 | (Malaysia) Leong Hong Seng | (Malaysia) Afiq Ashraf Mohd Abd Rahman | ZeroFour | N/A |
| Negeri Sembilan FC U18 | (Malaysia) Azmi Mohamed | (Malaysia) Azri Hanif Noor | Warrix | N/A |
| PDRM FC U18 | (Malaysia) Basirul Abu Bakar | (Malaysia) Ananda a/l Cha Rin | Lotto | redONE mobile |
| Penang FC III | (Malaysia) Noraffendi Taib | (Malaysia) Naufal Solihin Nazri | Kaki Jersi | Penang2030 |
| Sabah FC III | (Malaysia) Jelius Ating | (Malaysia) Ronan Hansanon Richard | DFR | N/A |
| Selangor FC U18 | (Malaysia) Mohd Khushairi Abd Wahab | (Malaysia) Muhammad Muayyad Mohd Daud | Joma | PKNS / MBI |
| SSTMI U17 | (Malaysia) Ahmad Yasser Arafat | (Malaysia) Sancleno Deem Ernesto | Grand Worldwide | SSTMI / Grand Worldwide |
| Terengganu FC U18 | (Malaysia) Yahaya Mohd Noor | (Malaysia) Ariff Safwan Suhaimi | ALX | TFCPLAY |

== League table ==
| Pos | Team | Pld | W | D | L | GF | GA | GD | Pts |
|---|---|---|---|---|---|---|---|---|---|
| 1 | Johor Darul Ta'zim IV (C) | 26 | 23 | 2 | 1 | 85 | 11 | +74 | 71 |
| 2 | Selangor FC U18 | 26 | 20 | 1 | 5 | 55 | 25 | +30 | 61 |
| 3 | Terengganu FC U18 | 26 | 19 | 0 | 7 | 61 | 35 | +26 | 57 |
| 4 | AMD U16 | 26 | 17 | 5 | 4 | 66 | 27 | +39 | 56 |
| 5 | Kuala Lumpur City U18 | 26 | 13 | 5 | 8 | 35 | 29 | +6 | 44 |
| 6 | Johor Darul Ta'zim V | 26 | 12 | 5 | 9 | 54 | 40 | +14 | 41 |
| 7 | SSTMI U17 | 26 | 9 | 5 | 12 | 44 | 42 | +2 | 32 |
| 8 | Penang FC III | 26 | 8 | 7 | 11 | 39 | 47 | −8 | 31 |
| 9 | AMD Future | 26 | 8 | 6 | 12 | 34 | 59 | −25 | 30 |
| 10 | Negeri Sembilan FC U18 | 26 | 8 | 4 | 14 | 35 | 42 | −7 | 28 |
| 11 | Melaka FA U18 | 26 | 6 | 5 | 15 | 17 | 44 | −27 | 23 |
| 12 | Kuching City FC U18 | 26 | 6 | 5 | 15 | 21 | 54 | −33 | 23 |
| 13 | Sabah FC III | 26 | 3 | 5 | 18 | 24 | 61 | −37 | 14 |
| 14 | PDRM FC U18 | 26 | 0 | 5 | 21 | 17 | 71 | −54 | 5 |

Updated to match(es) played on 1 November 2025. Source: FAM-CMS
Rules for classification: 1) Points; 2) Goal difference; 3) Number of goals scored.
(C) League Champion

== Results table ==
| Home \ Away | AMD | FUT | JIV | JDV | KLC | KUC | MEL | NEG | PDR | PEN | SAB | SEL | SST | TER |
|---|---|---|---|---|---|---|---|---|---|---|---|---|---|---|
| AMD U16 | | 3–2 | 1–0 | 0–4 | 4–1 | 5–0 | 2–0 | 2–1 | 9–0 | 2–2 | 5–0 | 4–0 | 2–1 | 1–0 |
| AMD Future | 0–6 | | – | – | – | – | 1–1 | – | 2–0 | 4–4 | – | – | – | – |
| Johor Darul Ta'zim IV | – | 8–0 | | – | 1–0 | – | 1–1 | – | – | 1–0 | – | – | – | 5–0 |
| Johor Darul Ta'zim V | – | 0–2 | 0–3 | | – | 5–0 | – | 2–1 | – | – | – | 2–3 | 2–1 | – |
| Kuala Lumpur City U18 | – | 2–0 | – | 3–3 | | – | – | 2–0 | 3–1 | 0–1 | 1–0 | – | – | – |
| Kuching City FC U18 | 2–2 | 0–2 | 1–4 | – | – | | – | 1–1 | 1–1 | – | – | – | – | 0–1 |
| Melaka FA U18 | – | – | – | 0–0 | 1–2 | 0–1 | | 1–0 | 3–0 | 0–2 | – | – | 2–1 | – |
| Negeri Sembilan FC U18 | 1–1 | – | 1–3 | – | – | – | – | | 4–2 | – | 1–1 | – | 2–2 | 0–1 |
| PDRM FC U18 | 1–1 | – | | – | – | – | – | – | | 1–2 | 1–1 | 0–4 | 1–4 | 2–3 |
| Penang FC III | – | – | – | 3–3 | – | 0–2 | – | 0–1 | – | | – | 1–2 | – | 2–3 |
| Sabah FC III | – | 3–1 | 1–2 | 1–1 | – | – | 1–0 | – | – | – | | – | 0–1 | – |
| Selangor FC U18 | – | 2–1 | – | – | 2–1 | 3–0 | 3–0 | 2–1 | – | – | 4–2 | | – | 5–1 |
| SSTMI U17 | – | 2–0 | 1–2 | – | 2–3 | 3–1 | – | – | – | 2–2 | – | 1–2 | | – |
| Terengganu FC U18 | 2–0 | 4–1 | – | – | 0–1 | – | – | – | – | – | 1–0 | – | 4–1 | |

Updated to match(es) played on 1 November 2025. Source: FAM-CMS
Legend: Blue = home team win; Yellow = draw; Red = away team win.
For upcoming matches, an "a" indicates there is an article about the rivalry between the two participants.

== Season statistics ==
=== Top goalscorers ===
As of 27 May 2025

| Rank | Player | Club | Goals |
|---|---|---|---|
| 1 | Zarul Aidid Mokhtar | Selangor U18 | 6 |
| 2 | Ierfan Hafizan | JDT IV | 5 |
| 2 | Muayyad Mohd Daud | Selangor U18 | 5 |
| 4 | Fadhlul Hadi | JDT IV | 4 |
| 5 | Danish Khalishah | Negeri Sembilan U18 | 3 |
| 5 | Saifullah Yusof | Penang U18 | 3 |
| 7 | 13 players | 8 clubs | 2 |
| 8 | 39 players | 15 clubs | 1 |

=== Hat-trick ===
| Player | Team | Against | Result | Date |
|---|---|---|---|---|
| Zarul Aidid Mokhtar | Selangor U18 | Kuching City U18 | 3–0 (H) | 14 May 2025 |

Note

^{4} Player with 4 goal
(H) Home dan (A) Away.

=== Own goals ===
| Rank | Player | Team | Against | Date | Goal |
|---|---|---|---|---|---|
| 1 | Mohd Firdaus Bin Hairul | Kuala Lumpur City U18 | AMD U16 | 26 April 2025 | 1 |
| 1 | Aman Shah Azlan | SSTMI U17 | Johor Darul Ta'zim V | 4 May 2025 | 1 |

== See also ==
- 2025–26 Piala Presiden (Malaysia)
