= 2016 Piala Belia =

Piala Belia
- Season: 2016
- Champions: (Malaysia) SSBJ U17
- Matches played: 194
- Goals scored: 512 (2.64 per match)
- Top goalscorer: Nur Izzat (11 goals)
- Biggest home win: Pahang U19 9–0 Perlis U19 (3 April 2016)
- Biggest away win: MISC-MIFA U19 1–8 SSBJ U17 (3 April 2016); Perlis U19 0–7 Penang U19 (1 May 2016)
- Highest scoring: Pahang U19 9–0 Perlis U19 (3 April 2016)
- Longest unbeaten run: Felda United U19 (13 matches)
- Longest winless run: Perlis U19 (14 matches)
- Longest losing run: Perlis U19 (11 matches)
- Highest attendance: 800; Sabah U19 1–2 Selangor U19 (6 March 2016)
- Lowest attendance: 50; Pahang U19 0–1 Penang U19 (28 February 2016); Perak U19 1–3 Kedah U19; SSMP U16 0–1 Terengganu U19 (1 May 2016); SSBJ U17 1–0 Malacca U19 (1 May 2016); Perlis U19 1–7 Sabah U19 (20 April 2016)
- Total attendance: 32,366
- Average attendance: 159

The 2016 Piala Belia (English: Youth Cup) is the Sixth season of the Piala Belia since its establishment in 2008. The league is currently the youth level (U19) football league in Malaysia. Selangor FA are the defending champions.

== Teams ==
The following teams contested in the 2016 Piala Belia. In order by the number given by FAM:-

- ATM FA
- Johor Darul Ta'zim F.C.
- Kedah FA
- Kelantan FA
- (Kuala Lumpur) FELDA United F.C.
- Kuala Lumpur FA
- (Malacca) Melaka United
- (Malaysia) MISC-MIFA
- Negeri Sembilan FA
- Pahang F.C.
- Perak FA
- Perlis FA
- Penang FA
- Sabah FA
- Sarawak FA
- (Malaysia) Bukit Jalil Sports School
- (Malaysia) SSMP U17
- (Malaysia) SSMP U16
- Selangor FA
- Terengganu FA

== Team summaries ==
=== Personnel and kits ===
Note: Flags indicate national team as has been defined under FIFA eligibility rules. Players and Managers may hold more than one non-FIFA nationality.

Team	Coach	Captain	Kit Manufacturer	Shirt Sponsor
ATM	(Malaysia) Ahmad Nazrie Hassan	(Malaysia)		
FELDA United	(Malaysia) Ahmad Shahrul Azhar Sofian	(Malaysia)	FBT	FELDA
MISC-MIFA	(Malaysia) Rada Krishnan a/l Nadesan	(Malaysia)	Umbro	MIFA
Bukit Jalil Sports School	(Malaysia) Reduan Abdullah	(Malaysia) Muhd Syaiful Alias	Nike	
SSMP U17	(Malaysia) Khalid Shahdan	(Malaysia)	Kappa	SSM Pahang
SSMP U16	(Malaysia) Somasundram a/l Periasamy	(Malaysia)	Kappa	SSM Pahang
Johor Darul Ta'zim IV	(Malaysia) Mohd Hamzani Omar	(Malaysia)	Adidas	Forest City
Kedah	(Malaysia) Roshidi Shaari	(Malaysia)	Warrix	Discover Kedah 2016
Kelantan	(Malaysia) Tengku Hazman Raja Hassan	(Malaysia)	De'eza DSV	Azhamzamiri.com
Kuala Lumpur	(Malaysia) Zolkipli Samion	(Malaysia)		
Melaka United	(Malaysia) G. Selvamohan	(Malaysia)	Kool	Jeram Anggun
Negeri Sembilan	(Malaysia) Rahimmudin Abdul Rahman	(Malaysia)	Kappa	Matrix Concepts
Pahang	(Malaysia) Muhd Fahim Kow Abdullah	(Malaysia)	Puma	
Perak	(Malaysia) Khairul Azuar Kamiron	(Malaysia)	Al-Ikhsan	Lembaga Air Perak & Perak Corp.
Perlis	(Malaysia) Jahfelus Jahit	(Malaysia)	Carino	Carino
Penang	(Malaysia) Mohd Faizal Sultan	(Malaysia)	Umbro	Penang Water Supply Corporation & Aspen Group
Sabah	(Malaysia) Jelius Ating	(Malaysia)	Carino & Warrix	Carino & Ararat
Sarawak	(Malaysia) Pengiran Bala	(Malaysia)	Starsports	
Selangor	(Malaysia) Noor Zaidi Rohmat	(Malaysia) M. Tamilmaran	Kappa	
Terengganu	(Malaysia) Zakari Alias	(Malaysia)	Kobert	Terengganu Incorporated

== League table ==
=== Group A ===
Pos	Team	Pld	W	D	L	GF	GA	GD	Pts	Relegation
1	Sabah U19	18	11	3	4	35	17	+18	36	Knockout Stage
2	Kedah U19	18	10	4	4	30	15	+15	34	Knockout Stage
3	Selangor U19	18	9	5	4	29	16	+13	32	Knockout Stage
4	Penang U19	18	8	7	3	32	12	+20	31	Knockout Stage
5	Perak U19	18	9	4	5	26	20	+6	31	
6	Pahang U19	18	7	3	8	30	25	+5	24	
7	Negeri Sembilan U19	18	7	3	8	15	19	−4	24	
8	(Malaysia) SSMP U17	18	5	6	7	20	16	+4	21	
9	Sarawak U19	18	3	4	11	16	31	−15	13	
10	Perlis U19	18	1	1	16	8	71	−63	4	

Source: FAM

=== Group B ===
Pos	Team	Pld	W	D	L	GF	GA	GD	Pts	Relegation
1	(Malaysia) SSBJ U17	18	11	5	2	48	18	+30	38	Knockout Stage
2	(Kuala Lumpur) Felda United U19	18	10	7	1	29	9	+20	37	Knockout Stage
3	(Malaysia) SSMP U16	18	11	4	3	36	17	+19	37	Knockout Stage
4	Kelantan U19	18	8	7	3	33	17	+16	31	Knockout Stage
5	(Johor) JDT IV	18	7	5	6	21	19	+2	26	
6	Terengganu U19	18	7	4	7	19	17	+2	25	
7	Kuala Lumpur U19	18	6	5	7	26	26	0	23	
8	(Malacca) Melaka United U19	18	4	5	9	15	20	−5	17	
9	(Kuala Lumpur) MISC-MIFA U19	18	2	3	13	14	42	−28	9	
10	ATM U19	18	1	1	16	5	61	−56	4	

Source: FAM

== Knock-out stage ==
=== Bracket ===
Quarter-finals
Kelantan U19	1	0	1
Sabah U19	0	0	0
Selangor U19	0	1	1
(Kuala Lumpur) Felda United U19	0	0	0
Penang U19	2	0	2
(Malaysia) SSBJ U17	3	1	4
(Malaysia) SSMP U16	1	1	2
Kedah U19	3	0	3

Semi-finals
Kelantan U19	0	1	1
Selangor U19	1	2	3
(Malaysia) SSBJ U17	2	0	2
Kedah U19	0	1	1

Final
Selangor U19	0	1	1
(Malaysia) SSBJ U17	1	2	3

=== Quarterfinals ===
Team 1	Agg.	Team 2	1st leg	2nd leg
Kelantan U19	1 – 0	Sabah U19	1 – 0	0 – 0
Selangor U19	1 – 0	(Kuala Lumpur) Felda United U19	0 – 0	1 – 0
Penang U19	2 – 4	(Malaysia) SSBJ U17	2 – 3	0 – 1
SSMP U16 (Malaysia)	2 – 3	Kedah U19	1 – 3	1 – 0

==== First leg ====
4 September 2016
16:45 (UTC+8)

Kelantan U19	1 – 0	Sabah U19
Mohamad Rudhwan 46'	Report

Sultan Mohammad IV Stadium, Kelantan
Attendance: 300
Referee: Samsudin Ibrahim

4 September 2016
16:45 (UTC+8)

Selangor U19	0 – 0	(Kuala Lumpur) Felda United U19
	Report

SUK Field, Selangor
Attendance: 300
Referee: Mohd Zohri Tajudin

4 September 2016
16:45 (UTC+8)

Penang U19	2 – 3	(Malaysia) SSBJ U17
Danish Afiq 10'; Afif Azman 78'	Report	Akif Syahiran 9'; Nurfais Johari 21'; Zafuan Azeman 75'

USM Stadium, Penang
Attendance: 250
Referee: Mohd Fairuz Zulkiflee

4 September 2016
16:45 (UTC+8)

SSMP U16 (Malaysia)	1 – 3	Kedah U19
Alif Haikal 22'	Report	Fakhrul Aiman 34'; Asnawi Sonkurnain 44'; Alif Romli 90+3'

Field Mokhtar Dahari Academy, Pahang
Attendance: 100++
Referee: Mohd Ridhwan Abdul Rahman

==== Second leg ====
26 September 2016
16:15 (UTC+8)

Sabah U19	0 – 0	Kelantan U19
	Report

Likas Stadium, Sabah
Attendance: 800+-
Referee: Mohd Fairuzi Mat Desa

Kelantan U19 won 1–0 on aggregate and advances to Semifinals

26 September 2016
16:15 (UTC+8)

Felda United U19 (Kuala Lumpur)	0 – 1	Selangor U19
	Report	Amirul Haziq 32'

Mini UPM Stadium, Selangor
Attendance: 200
Referee: Ismail Asib Bin Md Amin

Selangor U19 won 1–0 on aggregate and advances to Semifinals

26 September 2016
16:15 (UTC+8)

SSBJ U17 (Malaysia)	1 – 0	Penang U19
Zafuan Azeman 49'	Report

MSN field, Kuala Lumpur
Attendance: 100
Referee: S. Logeswaran

SSBJ U17 won 4–2 on Aggregate and advances to Semifinals

26 September 2016
16:15 (UTC+8)

Kedah U19	0 – 1	(Malaysia) SSMP U16
	Report	Nizarruddin Jazi 90+2'

Mini Stadium, Kedah
Attendance: 300
Referee: Shaharudin Man

Kedah U19 won 3–2 on aggregate and advances to Semifinals

=== Semifinals ===
Team 1	Agg.	Team 2	1st leg	2nd leg
Kelantan U19	1 – 3	Selangor U19	0 – 1	1 – 2
(Malaysia) SSBJ U17	2 – 1	Kedah U19	2 – 0	0 – 1

==== First leg ====
2 October 2016
16:45 (UTC+8)

Kelantan U19	0 – 1	Selangor U19
	Report	Fazrul Zeky 8'

Sultan Mohammad IV Stadium, Kelantan
Attendance: 345
Referee: Sukri Abdul Rahman

2 October 2016
16:45 (UTC+8)

SSBJ U17 (Malaysia)	2 – 0	Kedah U19
Al Aiman Zaini 45'; Arief Fahmie 58'	Report

MSN field, Kuala Lumpur
Attendance: 230
Referee: Zulkarnain Zakaria

==== Second leg ====
9 October 2016
16:15 (UTC+8)

Selangor U19	2 – 1	Kelantan U19
Ainol Iskandar 28'; S. Linggeswaran 68'	Report	Danial Ashraf 41'

SUK Field, Selangor
Attendance: 300 ++
Referee: Mohd Ridzuan Rozali

Selangor U19 won 3–1 on aggregate and advances to Final

9 October 2016
16:15 (UTC+8)

Kedah U19	1 – 0	(Malaysia) SSBJ U17
Fadzrul Danel 58'	Report

Mini Stadium, Kedah
Attendance: 350
Referee: Hamdan Awang

SSBJ U17 won 2–1 on aggregate and advances to Final

== Final ==
Team 1	Agg.	Team 2	1st leg	2nd leg
Selangor U19	1 – 3	(Malaysia) SSBJ U17	0 – 1	1 – 2

=== First leg ===
16 October 2016
20:45 (UTC+8)

Selangor U19	0 – 1	(Malaysia) SSBJ U17
	Report	Zafuan Azeman 69'

Majlis Perbandaran Selayang Stadium, Selangor
Attendance: 992
Referee: Rafifi Anuar Abdullah

=== Second leg ===
23 October 2016
20:45 (UTC+8)

SSBJ U17 (Malaysia)	2 – 1	Selangor U19
Awang Haziq 26'; Zafuan Azeman 44'	Report	Fazrul Zeky 20'

University Malaya Arena Stadium, Kuala Lumpur
Attendance: 650
Referee: Tiong Eng Tai

Winners with Aggregate result are Champions 2016 Piala Belia

== Champions ==
Champions

SSBJ U17
1st Title

== Goalscorer ==
=== Top scorers ===
Rank	Name	Club	Goal
1	Nur Izzat Awang	Pahang U-19	11
2	Mohamad Arief Fahmie	(Malaysia) SSBJ U-17	10
3	Hamran Peter	Sabah U-19	9
3	Muhamad Danial Arifin	Penang U-19	9
3	Zafuan Azeman	(Malaysia) SSBJ U-17	9
4	Muhamad Rafie Yaacob	Kelantan U-19	8
4	Azrie Reza Zamri	Kedah U-19	8

== See also ==
- 2016 Malaysia Super League
- 2016 Malaysia Premier League
- 2016 Malaysia FAM Cup
- 2016 Malaysia FA Cup
- 2016 Malaysia President's Cup
