= Piala Belia =

- Founded: 2008; 18 years ago
- Country: Malaysia
- Confederation: AFC
- Number of clubs: 18
- Current champions: Johor Darul Ta'zim IV (3rd title)
- Most championships: Selangor (4 titles)
- Broadcaster: Astro Arena
- Current: 2026–27 Piala Belia

The Piala Belia (English: Youth Cup) is a youth football competition for under-18 players in Malaysia. The competition consists of youth squads from clubs competing in the Malaysian football league system and sports schools under the Football Association of Malaysia (FAM). It exists alongside the developmental competition for under-21 players, the Piala Presiden.

== History ==
Since its inception in 2008, the Piala Belia has been a major tournament for under-19 players. In 2009 to 2011, the competition was combined with the Piala Presiden. In 2015 the format of the competition was changed to a league format.

In 2016, the tournament format was also changed with the clubs being divided into two groups and played a round-robin leg, with four top clubs from each group at the end of the season qualifying for the playoff round to determine the champion. The final match for the cup is broadcast by Astro Arena.

Starting from 2023, the Piala Belia will only allow under-18 players. The reason of changing the age limit is because to be in line with the age limit cycle for Asian Football Confederation (AFC) competitions.

== Results ==
- Starting in 2023, the Piala Belia age limit will decrease from the age of 19 to 18.

Piala Belia finals
Year	Winners	Score	Runners-up	Venue
2008	Kelantan	3–1	(Selangor) SSBJ	Sultan Muhammad IV Stadium
2009	Merged with Piala Presiden			
2010	Merged with Piala Presiden			
2011	Merged with Piala Presiden			
2012	Perak	1–0	Perlis	UUM Sports Complex Mini Stadium
2013	Selangor	2–1	Kelantan	Darul Makmur Stadium
2014	Kelantan	7–1	(Malaysia) PDRM	Hang Jebat Stadium
2015	Selangor	RR	(Pahang) SSMP	—
Year	Home team	Score	Away team	Venue
2016	Selangor	0–1	(Selangor) SSBJ	Selayang Municipal Council Stadium
2016	(Selangor) SSBJ	2–1	Selangor	UM Arena Stadium
2016	SSBJ won 3–1 on aggregate			
2017	(Pahang) SSMP	3–2	Kedah Darul Aman D	UiTM Stadium
2017	Kedah Darul Aman D	1–0	(Pahang) SSMP	Darul Aman Stadium
2017	Aggregate 3–3, Kedah Darul Aman D won on away goals			
Year	Winner	Score	Runner-up	Venue
2018	(Selangor) PKNS	2–1	Terengganu IV	Kuala Lumpur Stadium
Year	Home team	Score	Away team	Venue
2019	(Selangor) PKNS	0–0	Terengganu IV	Petaling Jaya Stadium
2019	Terengganu IV	1–0	(Selangor) PKNS	Sultan Ismail Nasiruddin Shah Stadium
2019	Terengganu IV won 1–0 on aggregate			
2020	cancel and declared null and void due to COVID-19 pandemic			
2021	cancel and declared null and void due to COVID-19 pandemic			
2022	Selangor	1–0	Sri Pahang	UiTM Stadium
2022	Sri Pahang	1–1	Selangor	Temerloh Mini Stadium
2022	Selangor won 2–1 on aggregate			
2023	Johor Darul Ta'zim IV	1–1	Selangor	Kulai Municipal Council Stadium
2023	Selangor	3–2	Johor Darul Ta'zim IV	UiTM Stadium
2023	Selangor won 4–3 on aggregate			
2024	Johor Darul Ta'zim IV	2–2	Terengganu IV	Pasir Gudang Corporation Stadium
2024	Terengganu IV	3–5	Johor Darul Ta'zim IV	Sultan Mizan Zainal Abidin Stadium
2024	Johor Darul Ta'zim IV won 7–5 on aggregate			
2025	Johor Darul Ta'zim IV	RR	Selangor FC U18	
2026	Johor Darul Ta'zim IV	RR	(Pahang) AMD A	

== Statistics ==
=== Performance by teams ===
Performances in the Piala Belia by team
Team	Title(s)	Runners-up	Years won	Years runner-up
Selangor	4	2	2013, 2015, 2022, 2023	2016, 2025
Johor Darul Ta'zim IV	3	1	2024, 2025, 2026	2023
Kelantan	2	1	2008, 2014	2013
Terengganu IV	1	2	2019	2018, 2024
(Selangor) SSBJ	1	1	2016	2008
(Selangor) PKNS	1	1	2018	2019
Perak	1	0	2012	—
Kedah Darul Aman D	1	0	2017	—
(Pahang) SSMP	0	2	—	2015, 2017
Perlis	0	1	—	2012
(Malaysia) PDRM	0	1	—	2014
Sri Pahang	0	1	—	2022
(Pahang) AMD A	0	1	—	2026

=== Top scorers ===
Year	Player	Team	Goals
2018	Asraff Aliffuddin	PKNS	14
2019	Daniel Irfan	Penang	15
2019	Isa Raman	Terengganu	15
2022	Khairil Zain	Selangor	12
2023	Izzat Syahir Zulihsan	Selangor	16
2024	Muhd Hatif Irfan Che Hamizi	Selangor	16
2025	Arayyan Hakeem bin Norizam	Johor Darul Ta'zim IV	26
2026	Fadhlul Hadi Zulkarnain	Johor Darul Ta'zim IV	19

== See also ==
- Piala Presiden
