= Khalid Shahdan =

Malaysian footballer and coach

Personal information
- Full name: Mohd Khalid bin Shahdan
- Date of birth: 5 July 1964 (age 62)
- Place of birth: Johor, Malaysia
- Height: 1.65 m (5 ft 5 in)
- Position: Midfielder

Senior career*
Years	Team	Apps	(Gls)
1981–1994	Johor	51	(16)
1995–1996	Johor FC		

International career^{‡}
1985–1989	Malaysia		

Managerial career
- 2004–2006: Johor FA (head coach)
- 2007: Johor Malays
- 2008–2012: Malaysia U-16 (Bandar Penawar Sports School)
- 2013–2014: Malaysia U-17 (Tunku Mahkota Ismail Sports School)
- 2015: Malaysia Pahang Sports School
- 2019: Johor Bahru FA
- * Club domestic league appearances and goals as of 21 December 2013 ‡ National team caps and goals as of 21 December 2013

Khalid Shahdan is a former Malaysian footballer and a current coach. He was often called the "Malaysia zico" by fans.

== Career ==
Khalid spent his footballing career in Johor, mainly with Johor FA, where he won two Malaysia Cup in 1985 and 1991 and Semi-Pro Division 1 championship in 1991. Towards the end of his footballing career, he played with Johor FC and won FAM Cup in 1995.

After retiring as player, Khalid moved into coaching, and earned coaching diploma from Football Association of Malaysia and Asian Football Confederation. He worked as coach in Johor FA in various age groups, and was the head coach of Johor in Malaysia Super League from 2004 to 2006. After he coached the Johor Malays team to win the King's Gold Cup championship in 2007, FA of Malaysia then employed Khalid as head coach for their youth teams.

== National team ==
An international for Malaysia in the 1980s, Khalid won the 1986 Merdeka Tournament. He also won silver medal for Malaysia in the 1987 Southeast Asian Games.

== Honours ==
=== Player ===
Johor FA

- Malaysia Super League / Division 1: 1991; runner-up 1985
- Malaysia Cup: 1985, 1991; runner-up 1986
- Malaysia Charity Shield: 1986; runner-up: 1992
- Sultan Hassanal Bolkiah Cup: 1987

Johor FC

- Malaysia FAM League: 1995; runner-up 1996

Malaysia

- Merdeka Cup: 1986
- Southeast Asian Games Silver Medal: 1987

=== Manager ===
Johor Malay

- King's Gold Cup: 2007
