= 2015 Piala Presiden (Malaysia) =

Football league in Malaysia

Piala Presiden
- Season: 2015
- Champions: Kelantan FA

The 2015 Piala Presiden (English: President Cup) is the 31st season of the Piala Presiden since its establishment in 1986. The league is currently the youth level (U21) football league in Malaysia. Perak U21 are the defending champions.

== Rule changes ==
The Piala Presiden is the amateur football competition in Malaysia for under-21 players. Since its inception in 1985, the Piala Presiden has been the major tournament for under-21 and under-23 players. In 2009, the format of the competition was changed with only under-20 players eligible to be fielded for the tournament. In 2015 the format of the competition reverted to the original format with under-21 players and three over age players eligible to play.

== Teams ==
The following teams will be participate in the 2015 Piala Presiden. In order by the number given by FAM:-

- Perlis FA
- Kuala Lumpur FA
- Penang FA
- Malacca United S.A.
- Pahang FA
- Kedah FA
- (Selangor) PKNS F.C.
- (Kuala Lumpur) PDRM FA
- (Kuala Lumpur) ATM FA
- (Kuala Lumpur) Felda United F.C.
- (Terengganu) T-Team F.C.
- Johor Darul Ta'zim F.C.
- (Negeri Sembilan) NS Matrix F.C.
- Selangor FA
- (Kuala Lumpur) Sime Darby F.C.
- Terengganu FA
- Sarawak FA
- Kelantan FA
- Perak FA
- Sabah FA

== Team summaries ==
=== Personnel and kits ===
Note: Flags indicate national team as has been defined under FIFA eligibility rules. Players and Managers may hold more than one non-FIFA nationality.

Team	Coach	Captain	Kit Manufacturer	Shirt Sponsor
ATM FA	(Malaysia) Jalil Man	(Malaysia)		
Johor Darul Ta'zim F.C.	(Croatia) Ervin Boban	(Malaysia)		
Kedah FA	(Malaysia) Mohamed Ramlee	(Malaysia)		
Kelantan FA	(Malaysia) Mohd Nafuzi Zain	(Malaysia)		
Felda United F.C.	(Malaysia) Sazali Saidun	(Malaysia)		
Sime Darby F.C.	(Malaysia) Radzali Imbi	(Malaysia)		
Kuala Lumpur FA	(Malaysia) Razak Jaamadi	(Malaysia)		
Malacca United S.A.	(Malaysia) Remeli Junit	(Malaysia)		
NS Matrix F.C.	(Malaysia) Badrul Afzan Razali	(Malaysia)		
Pahang FA	(Malaysia) Azaruddin Aziz	(Malaysia)		
PDRM FA	(Malaysia) Anuar Udin	(Malaysia)		
Perak U21	(Malaysia) Sayuddin Mohd Isa	(Malaysia)		
Perlis FA	(Malaysia) Azizul Abidin	(Malaysia)		
Penang FA	(Malaysia) S. Veloo	(Malaysia)		
Sabah FA	(Malaysia) R. Gopal Krishnan	(Malaysia)		
Sarawak FA	(Malaysia) Johnny Dominicus	(Malaysia)		
Selangor FA	(Malaysia) Nor Suhaimi Bahauddin	(Malaysia)		
PKNS F.C.	(Malaysia) Ridzuan Abu Shah	(Malaysia)		
Terengganu FA	(Malaysia) Roshaidi Wahab	(Malaysia)		
T-Team F.C.	(Malaysia) Syamsul Saad	(Malaysia)		

== League table ==
=== Group A ===
Pos	Team	Pld	W	D	L	GF	GA	GD	Pts	Qualification
1	Perak U21 (Q)	18	11	5	2	35	16	+19	38	Qualification for Knockout Stage
2	(Kuala Lumpur) Sime Darby F.C. (Q)	18	11	5	2	31	12	+19	38	Qualification for Knockout Stage
3	Terengganu FA (Q)	18	11	4	3	35	11	+24	37	Qualification for Knockout Stage
4	Pahang FA (Q)	18	10	1	7	39	27	+12	31	Qualification for Knockout Stage
5	(Terengganu) T-Team F.C.	18	7	5	6	19	20	−1	26	
6	Selangor FA	18	7	1	10	19	20	−1	22	
7	(Johor) JDT IV	18	4	5	9	21	34	−13	17	
8	Perlis FA	18	4	4	10	15	27	−12	16	
9	Sarawak FA	18	4	3	11	22	34	−12	15	
10	(Kuala Lumpur) ATM FA	18	4	1	13	13	48	−35	13	

Updated to match(es) played on 15 June 2015. Source: MFL Official Site
Rules for classification: 1) points; 2) goal difference; 3) number of goals scored.
(Q) Qualified for the phase indicated

=== Group B ===
Pos	Team	Pld	W	D	L	GF	GA	GD	Pts	Qualification
1	(Kuala Lumpur) PDRM FA (Q)	18	10	6	2	28	20	+8	36	Qualification for Knockout Stage
2	Kedah FA (Q)	18	8	8	2	23	10	+13	32	Qualification for Knockout Stage
3	Penang FA (Q)	18	9	4	5	28	20	+8	31	Qualification for Knockout Stage
4	Kelantan FA (Q)	18	8	7	3	26	18	+8	31	Qualification for Knockout Stage
5	(Selangor) PKNS F.C.	18	8	5	5	27	19	+8	29	
6	(Kuala Lumpur) Felda United F.C.	18	8	2	8	27	22	+5	26	
7	(Negeri Sembilan) NS Matrix F.C.	18	6	1	11	14	19	−5	19	
8	Sabah FA	18	3	6	9	17	33	−16	15	
9	Malacca United F.C.	18	3	5	10	19	38	−19	14	
10	Kuala Lumpur FA	18	3	4	11	15	25	−10	13	

Updated to match(es) played on 15 June 2015. Source: MFL Official Site
Rules for classification: 1) points; 2) goal difference; 3) number of goals scored.
(Q) Qualified for the phase indicated

== Fixtures and results ==
Fixtures and results of the Piala Presiden 2015 season.

Source: FAM

=== Group A ===
==== Week 1 ====
4 February 2015	JDT IV	1–1	Perak U21	UTM Stadium Tuanku Syed Putra Stadium, Skudai, Johor
16:45 UTC+8	Sean Gan Gianelli 50'	Report	Khairul Asyraf 27'	Attendance: 200; Referee: Zainol Abdul Aziz

4 February 2015	ATM FA	0–3	Terengganu FA	Kementah Stadium, Kuala Lumpur
16:45 UTC+8		Report	Ridzuan Razali 43'; Azrean Aziz 54'; Fahmi Mohd 84'	Attendance: 100; Referee: Tuan Mohd Yasin Tuan Hanafiah

4 February 2015	Pahang FA	1–2	Perlis FA	University Malaysia Pahang Stadium, Gambang, Pahang
16:45 UTC+8	Faizal Abdul Rani 18'	Report	Che Mohd Safwan Hazman 28'; Firdaus Zulkafli 86'	Attendance: 100; Referee: Muhammad Nasaruddin Tamrin

4 February 2015	T-Team F.C.	3–1	Sarawak FA	Fields C Terengganu Sports Complex, Gong Badak, Terengganu
16:45 UTC+8	Zarulizwan Mazlan 2'; Aiman Amran 24'; Zulhanizam Shafine 39'	Report	Hafis Saperi 87'	Attendance: 300; Referee: Saiful Mohd Razali

4 February 2015	Selangor FA	0–2	Sime Darby F.C.	Utama Stadium, Kuala Selangor, Selangor
16:45 UTC+8		Report	Rafiq Shah Zaim 3'; Faiz Hanif Adenan 90+2'	Attendance: 100; Referee: Mohd Marzuki Yusoff

=== Group B ===
==== Week 1 ====
4 February 2015	Kedah FA	1–0	Felda United F.C.	Darul Aman Stadium, Alor Star, Kedah
16:45 UTC+8	Mohd Nor Hamizaref 34'	Report		Attendance: 200; Referee: Mohd Shafiq Salji

4 February 2015	Sabah FA	1–1	PDRM FA	Likas Stadium, Sabah
16:15 UTC+8	Hafizan Jahar 54'	Report		Attendance: 150; Referee: Azman Jamaludin

4 February 2015	NS Matrix F.C.	2–0	Malacca United F.C.	Mini Tampin Stadium, Tampin, Negeri Sembilan
16:45 UTC+8	Syahrizal Shaharin 75'; Fauzi Abdul Latif 90+1'	Report		Attendance: 200; Referee: Mohd Ridhwan

4 February 2015	Kuala Lumpur FA	1–2	Kelantan FA	Maybank Sports Complex, Bangi, Kuala Lumpur
16:45 UTC+8	Afzal Nazri 43'	Report	Fakhrul Zaman 47'; Faizwan Abdullah 64'	Attendance: 200; Referee: Hamdan Awang

4 February 2015	Penang FA	0–2	PKNS F.C.	USM Stadium, Kepala Batas, Pulau Pinang
16:45 UTC+8		Report	Nik Syafiq Syazwan 37'; R. Thivagar 89'	Attendance: 100; Referee: Mohd Khairulsyahmi Ahmad Khalidi

== Knock-out stage ==
In the knockout phase, teams played against each other over two legs on a home-and-away basis, except for the one-match final.

=== Quarter-finals ===
The first legs were played on 25 July 2015, and the second legs were played on 1 and 2 August 2015.

Team 1	Agg.	Team 2	1st leg	2nd leg
Perak	3–3 (a)	Kelantan	2–2	1–1
Sime Darby (Kuala Lumpur)	0–1	Penang	0–1	0–0
Terengganu	3–1	Kedah	2–1	1–0
Pahang	1–3	PDRM	1–2	0–1

=== First leg ===
25 July 2015
16:45 UTC+8

Perak	2–2	Kelantan
Harish Roslee 6', 19'	Report	Fakhrul Zaman 17'; Syahrul Akim 25'

Perak Stadium, Ipoh, Perak
Attendance: 250
Referee: Ahmad Farees Mat Suburi

25 July 2015
16:45 UTC+8

Sime Darby (Kuala Lumpur)	0–1	Penang
A.Fayyad	Report	A.Fayyad 86'

UKM Bangi Stadium, Bangi, Selangor
Attendance: 100
Referee: Muhammad Nasruddin Tamrin

25 July 2015
16:45 UTC+8

Terengganu	2–1	Kedah
Md Amirul Syahmi 21', 90+1'	Report	Muhd Muzaimir 24'

Sultan Ismail Nasiruddin Shah Stadium, Kuala Terengganu, Terengganu
Attendance: 300
Referee: Mohd Nazri Saptu

25 July 2015
16:45 UTC+8

Pahang	1–2	PDRM
Ridhwan Maidin 26'	Report	Farhan 72'; Syafiq Redzuan 88'

Darul Makmur Stadium, Kuantan, Pahang
Attendance: 200
Referee: Muhammad Firdaus Ibrahim

=== Second leg ===
2 August 2015
20:45 UTC+8

Kelantan	1–1	Perak U21
Nasharizam 89'	Report	E. Paranitharan 68'

Sultan Muhammad IV Stadium, Kota Bharu, Kelantan
Attendance: 300
Referee: Tiong Eng Tai

1 August 2015
16:15 UTC+8

Penang	0–0	(Kuala Lumpur) Sime Darby
	Report

City Stadium, Georgetown, Penang
Attendance: 140
Referee: Shaharudin Man

1 August 2015
16:15 UTC+8

Kedah	0–1	Terengganu
	Report	Syed Sobri 66'

UUM Mini Stadium, Sintok, Kedah
Attendance: 500
Referee: Mohd Faruzi Mohd Desa

1 August 2015

PDRM	1–0	Pahang

=== Semi-finals ===
Team 1	Agg.	Team 2	1st leg	2nd leg
Penang	2–1	PDRM	1–0	1–1
Kelantan	4–2	Terengganu	1–1	3–1

=== First leg ===
8 August 2015
20:45 UTC+8

Penang	1–0	PDRM
Fayyad 59'	Report

City Stadium, Penang
Attendance: 600
Referee: Suresh Jayaraman

9 August 2015
20:45 UTC+8

Kelantan	1–1	Terengganu
Nik Aznil Shyam 48'	Report	Md Faizwan 90+1'

Sultan Muhammad IV Stadium, Kota Bharu, Kelantan
Attendance: 350
Referee: Saiful Mohd Radzali

=== Second leg ===
15 August 2015
16:15 UTC+8

Terengganu	1–3	Kelantan
Syed Sobri 88'	Report	Fakhrul 2', 47'; Wan Muhd Azam 63'

Sultan Ismail Nasiruddin Shah Stadium, Kuala Terengganu, Terengganu
Attendance: 500
Referee: Ahmad Tajuddin Mohd Yusoff

16 August 2015
16:15 UTC+8

PDRM	1–1	Penang
Osman Damanhuri 68'	Report	Lim Yong Seng 51'

PULAPOL Main Field, Kuala Lumpur
Attendance: 200
Referee: Khairul Azuan Kidam

=== Final ===
28 August 2015
20:45 UTC+8

Kelantan	2–1	Penang
Fakhrul 38'; Azwan 66'	Report	Amirul 50'

City Stadium, George Town, Penang
Attendance: 5,276
Referee: Shaharuddin Man

== Champions ==
Champions
Kelantan U21
6th title

== See also ==
- 2015 Malaysia Super League
- 2015 Malaysia Premier League
- 2015 Malaysia FAM League
- 2015 Malaysia FA Cup
- 2015 Piala Belia
