= Penang F.C. Reserves =

- Full name: Penang Football Club Reserves
- Nickname(s): The Panthers
- Founded: 1985; 40 years ago
- Ground: City Stadium; Penang State Stadium; USM Athletics Stadium
- Capacity: 20,000 (City Stadium); 40,000 (Penang State Stadium); 800 (USM Athletics Stadium)
- Chairman: Soon Lip Chee
- Head coach: Akmal Rizal (U23); Rahim Hassan (U21); Zabidi Hassan (U19)
- League: Malaysia President Cup (U-21); Malaysia Youth Cup (U-18)
- Website: http://www.penangfc.com.my/
Home colours	Away colours	Third colours

Penang Reserves is a reserve team of Penang which consists of U-23, U-21 and U-18. Penang FC under-23 played in the MFL Cup, which was the top level of reserve football in Malaysia. Penang FC under-21 plays in the Malaysia President Cup. They were the champions in the 2004 season. Penang FC under-18 plays in the Malaysia Youth Cup.

The youth setup has produced some Malaysia internationals, such as Salahuddin Che Rose, Moey Kok Hong, Kamarulzaman Hassan, Megat Amir Faisal, Hasmawi Hassan, Abdul Aziz Ismail, S. Veenod, S. Kumaahran, Syamer Kutty Abba, and Faisal Halim.

== Current squad ==
=== U23 ===
As of 2 March 2025

No.	Player	Position	Nationality	Date of birth (age)
1	Muhammad Izzul Azry Abu Mansor	GK	(Malaysia)	8 February 2002 (age 23)
20	Al-Iman Wahiey Muhammad Amir	GK	(Malaysia)	1 May 2002 (age 23)
22	Muhammad Adeli Mohd Saad	GK	(Malaysia)	5 August 2003 (age 21)
33	Muhamad Haziq Mukriz Mohamed Hasemuddin	GK	(Malaysia)	19 April 2003 (age 22)
2	Muhammad Irfan Zikry Mohd Padzly	DF	(Malaysia)	22 April 2003 (age 22)
3	Norasyraf Aiman Norlizam	DF	(Malaysia)	22 April 2002 (age 23)
4	Muhammad Amirul Iqmal Rashedi	MF	(Malaysia)	24 September 2003 (age 21)
5	Mohammad Zarif Syamil Zamani	DF	(Malaysia)	11 December 2002 (age 22)
13	Muhamad Haziq Idris	DF	(Malaysia)	3 November 2001 (age 23)
19	Mujibur Rahman Ahmad Zaki	DF	(Malaysia)	3 July 2002 (age 23)
23	Muhammad Haleif Hazreil Mohd Harif	DF	(Malaysia)	2 March 2001 (age 24)
27	Muhammad Nabil Ahmad Nizam	DF	(Malaysia)	26 February 2001 (age 24)
67	Muhammad Aikmal Roslan	DF	(Malaysia)	11 February 2001 (age 24)
83	Harith Iskandar Masri	DF	(Malaysia)	5 October 2005 (age 19)
6	Ahmad Haziq Kutty Abba	MF	(Malaysia)	28 September 2004 (age 20)
7	Muhammad Ad'dha Nazman	MF	(Malaysia)	10 March 2002 (age 23)
8	Muhammad Chairil Ismail	MF	(Malaysia)	28 June 2002 (age 23)
14	Muhammad Ainul Fitri Hairi Anuar	MF	(Malaysia)	21 November 2003 (age 21)
17	Muhammad Nur Haikal Abd Rahim	MF	(Malaysia)	3 January 2005 (age 20)
20	Muhammad Adam Nadzmi Zamri	MF	(Malaysia)	28 May 2002 (age 23)
30	Harith Danielle Abdullah	MF	(Malaysia)	6 March 2004 (age 21)
70	Muhammad Shafi Azswad Sapari	MF	(Malaysia)	9 March 2001 (age 24)
71	Muhammad Izzat Zikri Iziruddin	MF	(Malaysia)	17 January 2001 (age 24)
9	Saffy Zikry Ndongo	FW	(Malaysia)	5 August 2005 (age 19)
10	Aidil Danial Izhar	FW	(Malaysia)	23 September 2001 (age 23)
11	Idrzuwan Daud	FW	(Malaysia)	15 April 2001 (age 24)
12	Hariharan Kartheyges	FW	(Malaysia)	6 April 2001 (age 24)
15	Muhammad Rafieq Al-Amzar Zulkifeli	FW	(Malaysia)	16 April 2003 (age 22)
18	Nor Shahmi Irfan Talaha	FW	(Malaysia)	6 June 2003 (age 22)
29	Mohamad Zul Hisyam Zamari	FW	(Malaysia)	24 February 2003 (age 22)
72	Aiman Fitrie Ismail	FW	(Malaysia)	5 October 2004 (age 20)
77	Muhammad Alif Ikmalrizal Anuar	FW	(Malaysia)	9 December 2002 (age 22)
81	Muhammad Akid Mohd Zamri	FW	(Malaysia)	13 February 2005 (age 20)
99	Mohd Daniel Irfan Mohd Nadzri	FW	(Malaysia)	30 September 2001 (age 23)

=== U21 ===
As of 2 March 2025

No.	Player	Position	Nationality	Date of birth (age)
1	Altaf Jasmadi	GK	(Malaysia)	20 January 2005 (age 20)
22	Muhammad Aiman Najmi Bin Nazri	GK	(Malaysia)	16 June 2004 (age 21)
26	Mohamad Hafiezi Bin Azizan	GK	(Malaysia)	23 September 2004 (age 20)
41	Muhammad Hasif Asyraf Othman	GK	(Malaysia)	5 October 2006 (age 18)
3	Muhamad Ammar Firdaus Bin Zainal Abidin	DF	(Malaysia)	28 February 2004 (age 21)
4	Muhammad Aidil Wafiy Yusri	DF	(Malaysia)	7 October 2006 (age 18)
5	Muhammad Aidil Azhar Bin Mohd Nadzhari	DF	(Malaysia)	30 January 2004 (age 21)
12	Muhamad Arif Bin Mohamad Azmi	DF	(Malaysia)	8 December 2005 (age 19)
14	Muhammad Muzaffar Bin Amir Hamzah	DF	(Malaysia)	1 February 2005 (age 20)
15	Dicky Hidayat Mesnianto	DF	(Malaysia)	29 January 2004 (age 21)
38	Harith Iskandar Masri	DF	(Malaysia)	5 October 2005 (age 19)
39	Muhammad Ikhmal Irshad Azaneilazman	DF	(Malaysia)	20 March 2006 (age 19)
6	Muhammad Danish Zakwan Azhar	MF	(Malaysia)	21 July 2006 (age 19)
7	Muhammad Muzammil Bin Mohd Zain	MF	(Malaysia)	19 February 2005 (age 20)
8	Nik Afiq Najmi Adnan	MF	(Malaysia)	16 March 2006 (age 19)
10	Mohammad Afiq Amsyar Bin Mohd Zarizal	MF	(Malaysia)	17 March 2004 (age 21)
11	Muhammad Ihsan Bin Khairul Anwar	MF	(Malaysia)	8 March 2005 (age 20)
13	Mohamad Nabil Adam Bin Abdul Aziz	MF	(Malaysia)	22 February 2005 (age 20)
20	Sharvin A/L Prem	MF	(Malaysia)	20 May 2005 (age 20)
21	Muhammad Amar Faizuddin Abdul Hamizi	MF	(Malaysia)	12 September 2006 (age 18)
23	Muhammad Aiman Haikal Shahrul Munawer	MF	(Malaysia)	25 January 2006 (age 19)
27	Muhammad Ilham Bin Kamarulhisham	MF	(Malaysia)	19 January 2005 (age 20)
29	Muhammad Fareez Abdul Majed	MF	(Malaysia)	10 December 2006 (age 18)
33	Muhammad Nur Haikal Bin Abd. Rahim	MF	(Malaysia)	3 January 2005 (age 20)
34	Harith Danielle Abdullah	MF	(Malaysia)	6 March 2004 (age 21)
35	Ahmad Haziq Kutty Abba	MF	(Malaysia)	28 September 2004 (age 20)
9	Azril Farihan Bin Mohd Firdaus	FW	(Malaysia)	15 August 2004 (age 20)
17	Aiman Fitrie Ismail	FW	(Malaysia)	5 October 2004 (age 20)
19	Muhammad Azim Akmal Safarinizam	FW	(Malaysia)	11 March 2006 (age 19)
30	Barry Jonah A/L Thamil Chelvan	FW	(Malaysia)	17 March 2004 (age 21)
31	Saffy Zikry Ndongo	FW	(Malaysia)	5 August 2005 (age 19)
32	Muhammad Rafieq Al-Amzar Zulkifeli	FW	(Malaysia)	16 April 2003 (age 22)

=== U18 ===
As of 2 March 2025

No.	Player	Position	Nationality	Date of birth (age)
41	Muhammad Hasif Asyraf Othman	GK	(Malaysia)	5 October 2006 (age 18)
42	Raja Muhammad Izzuddin Bin Raja Azari	GK	(Malaysia)	16 February 2006 (age 19)
43	Muhammad Irfan Hayato Bin Ismail	GK	(Malaysia)	29 March 2006 (age 19)
4	Muhammad Aidil Wafiy Yusri	DF	(Malaysia)	7 October 2006 (age 18)
39	Muhammad Ikhmal Irshad Azaneilazman	DF	(Malaysia)	20 March 2006 (age 19)
44	Muhammad Putra Farrez Irfan Bin Zailal	DF	(Malaysia)	12 May 2006 (age 19)
45	Irwan Haiqal Bin Mohd Khairul	DF	(Malaysia)	30 May 2006 (age 19)
46	Mohamad Aidil Solihin Bin Ahmad Fadzli	DF	(Malaysia)	7 July 2006 (age 19)
47	Muhammad Irfan Bin Md Nawi	DF	(Malaysia)	30 April 2006 (age 19)
48	Muhamad Khairul Ikhwan Bin Nazree	DF	(Malaysia)	12 December 2006 (age 18)
49	Muhamad Afif Rafiqin Bin Roslan	DF	(Malaysia)	31 December 2006 (age 18)
50	Muhammad Irfan Bin Mohd Yuzee	DF	(Malaysia)	5 March 2006 (age 19)
6	Muhammad Danish Zakwan	MF	(Malaysia)	21 July 2006 (age 19)
8	Nik Afiq Najmi Adnan	MF	(Malaysia)	16 March 2006 (age 19)
21	Muhammad Amar Faizuddin Abdul Hamizi	MF	(Malaysia)	12 September 2006 (age 18)
23	Muhammad Aiman Haikal Bin Shahrul Munawer	MF	(Malaysia)	25 January 2006 (age 19)
29	Muhammad Fareez Abdul Majed	MF	(Malaysia)	10 December 2006 (age 18)
51	Mohamad Noor Haidhar Bin Mohamad Rizal	MF	(Malaysia)	22 August 2006 (age 18)
52	Hazriq Fikrie Bin Hisham	MF	(Malaysia)	5 December 2006 (age 18)
53	Muhamad Danial Akmal Bin Roslan	MF	(Malaysia)	20 September 2006 (age 18)
54	Muhammad Ramadhan Bin Abdullah	MF	(Malaysia)	13 October 2006 (age 18)
55	Muhammad Ashraaf Bin Suffian	MF	(Malaysia)	20 October 2006 (age 18)
56	Muhammad Fahmy Haziq Bin Joharie	MF	(Malaysia)	28 September 2007 (age 17)
57	Syafir Muzanie Bin Saiful Hafiz	MF	(Malaysia)	6 August 2007 (age 17)
58	Muhammad Syammer Haikarl Bin Saiful Bahri	MF	(Malaysia)	4 October 2007 (age 17)
59	Muhammad Adam Furqan Bin Noor Azrul	MF	(Malaysia)	16 May 2007 (age 18)
60	Thinalan A/L Nadarajan	MF	(Malaysia)	14 March 2006 (age 19)
61	Muhammad Haris Bin Shamim Ahmad	MF	(Malaysia)	29 January 2007 (age 18)
62	Muhammad Muhaiman Izzat Bin Asmi	MF	(Malaysia)	14 April 2006 (age 19)
63	Kathiravaan A/L Murugesu	MF	(Malaysia)	11 May 2007 (age 18)
19	Muhammad Azim Akmal Safarinizam	FW	(Malaysia)	11 March 2006 (age 19)
64	Muhamad Haris Iskandar Bin Mohd Roslan	FW	(Malaysia)	23 September 2006 (age 18)
65	Muhammad Iqwan Hafiz Bin Zaizi	FW	(Malaysia)	17 March 2006 (age 19)
66	Saiful Muhayman Bin Yusmizam Zuhairi	FW	(Malaysia)	5 July 2007 (age 18)

== Coaching and technical staff ==
Position	Name
U-23 team manager	(Malaysia) Mahathir Jamal
U-23 head coach	(Malaysia) Akmal Rizal
U-23 assistant coach	(Malaysia) Farkhis Fisol
U-23 goalkeeping coach	(Malaysia) Azmirulkifli Isa
U-23 fitness coach	(Malaysia) Naim Sukri
U-23 team doctor	(Malaysia) Kevin Raj Pergas
U-23 physiotherapist	(Malaysia) Amirul Ehsan Mahrim
U-23 kitman	(Malaysia) Hafiz Ismail
U-21 team manager	(Malaysia) Gaffaar Hoosen
U-21 head coach	(Malaysia) Rahim Hassan
U-21 assistant coach	(Malaysia) Shamsuddin Yusoff
U-21 goalkeeping coach	(Malaysia) Afiq Aziz
U-21 fitness coach	(Malaysia) Faizal Nazari
U-21 physiotherapist	(Malaysia) Izzul Na'im
U-21 kitman	(Malaysia) Syauqi Jamil
U-18 team manager	(Malaysia) Kow Ah Chai
U-19 head coach	(Malaysia) Zabidi Hassan
U-19 assistant coach	(Malaysia) Mahendran Kataya
U-19 goalkeeping coach	(Malaysia) Zamri Arif
U-19 fitness coach	(Malaysia) Asyraf Halim
U-19 0hysiotherapist	(Malaysia) Aizat Zabidi
U-19 kitman	(Malaysia) Adzzhar Roadhi

Source: Source:

== Head coaches history ==
U-21

Year	Head coach
2017	(Penang) Manzoor Azwira
2022–2023	(Kedah) Akmal Rizal
2023 –current	(Penang) Rahim Hassan

U-18

Year	Head coach
2022 –current	(Penang) Zabidi Hassan

== Kit manufacturers ==
Season	Kit manufacturer
2000	Umbro
2001–2005	Toray Pen-Group
2006–2007	Lotto
2008–2009	Specs
2010	Joma
2011	Eutag
2012–2013	Joma
2014–2016	Umbro
2017	Legea
2018	Puma
2019–2020	Stallion
2021–	Puma

== Honours ==
Title	Winners	Runners-up
Malaysia President Cup (1)	2004	2015

== See also ==
- Penang F.C.
