= Sarawak FA President and Youth =

Sarawak FA Under-21s (Sarawak B)
- Full name: Sarawak Football Association Under-21s
- Nicknames: Ngap Sayot; Bujang Senang (The Crocs)
- Ground: Sarawak Stadium
- Capacity: 40,000
- League: Malaysian President's Cup
- 2015: Malaysian President's Cup, Group A, 7th

Sarawak Football Association Under-21s or Sarawak B was the most senior of Sarawak's youth teams. They last played in the Malaysian President's Cup.
