= Perak FA II football team =

Perak FA II
- Full name: Perak FA II football team
- Founded: 2026; 0 years ago (revived)
- Ground: Stadium Perak, Ipoh
- Capacity: 42,500
- Owner: Perak Football Association
- Head coach: Syamsul Saad
- League: Malaysia A2 Amateur League
- 2026–27: Debut season

Perak FA II is the reserve and feeder team of Malaysian football club Perak FA. Re-established by the Perak Football Association (PAFA) in 2026 following the liquidation of the previous privatized entity (Perak FC II), the team provides a competitive platform for under-21 and under-23 players from Perak to transition into senior semi-professional football in the Malaysia A1 Semi-Pro League.

== History ==
=== Predecessor: PKNP FC and Perak FC II (2015–2025) ===
The lineage of a second Perak team in the Malaysian football pyramid began on 30 July 2015 with the founding of PKNP FC by the Perak State Development Corporation (Perbadanan Kemajuan Negeri Perak). After winning the third-tier Malaysia FAM League in 2016 and earning back-to-back promotions to reach the top-tier Malaysia Super League by 2018, PKNP FC was absorbed by PAFA ahead of the 2020 season due to financial restructuring and Malaysian Football League (MFL) feeder-club regulations.

Rebranded as Perak FA II (and later Perak FC II following club privatization), the team competed in the Malaysia Premier League (2020–2021) and the Under-23 MFL Cup (2023–2025). However, in mid-2025, parent club Perak FC collapsed due to severe financial debts and withdrew from the M-League, resulting in the formal dissolution of Perak FC II.

=== Revival under PAFA (2026–present) ===
Following the collapse of the privatized club, PAFA reclaimed control of state football operations and registered a revived Perak FA senior side in the second-tier Liga A1 Semi-Pro.

Ahead of the 2026–27 Malaysian football calendar, PAFA elected not to enter squads into the traditional President's Cup (U-21) and Youth Cup (U-19) tournaments. Instead, PAFA President Dato' Haji Mohd Azhar Jamaluddin announced the creation of a new Perak FA II squad to compete directly against senior amateur clubs in the 2026–27 Malaysia A2 Amateur League, managed by the Amateur Football League (AFL). Former Perak defender and coach Syamsul Saad was appointed as the inaugural head coach of the revived reserve side.

=== Role in Perak Football Development ===
Perak FA II acts as the primary bridge between district-level grassroots competitions across Perak and the senior Perak FA squad. By competing in the Liga A2 Amateur rather than age-restricted youth tournaments, the club aims to expose young local prospects to physical, senior-level competition while reducing operational overhead for the state association.

== Players ==
=== Current squad ===
As of 13 November 2026

Note: Flags indicate national team as defined under FIFA eligibility rules; some limited exceptions apply. Players may hold more than one non-FIFA nationality.

No.	Pos.	Nation	Player
5	MF	MAS	Irfan Shah Zainuri (captain)
6	MF	MAS	Aqil Amsyar Yusri
7	MF	MAS	Muhammad Aidil Hakim
9	MF	MAS	Danial Qalish Hakim
10	DF	MAS	Aiman Aqasha Azman
11	MF	MAS	Hazim Jamal Hisam
14	MF	MAS	Alif Danial Rohaizad
15	MF	MAS	Lutfi Shahrulnizam
16	MF	MAS	Zikry Iqwan Zaharudin
17	MF	MAS	Fathul Aqil Hisham
19	DF	MAS	Haiqal Danish Halmee
20	MF	MAS	Ahmad Haziq Azfar
21	MF	MAS	Ammar Haikal Mohd Faizal
22	MF	MAS	Yashodan a/l Vijayabalan

No.	Pos.	Nation	Player
23	DF	MAS	Hafizul Iman Azizan
25	GK	MAS	Nazrin Adam Khalid
26	DF	MAS	Haikal Hamizan Hasri
27	MF	MAS	Norsharul Faezi Norzihan
28	MF	MAS	Iman Syakir Amzan
30	FW	MAS	Nur Hirfan Mohd Helmi
33	GK	MAS	Raif Idlan Syaiful Syahril
34	DF	MAS	Amirul Fikri Abdullah
35	GK	MAS	Zariff Mohd Faizal
36	DF	MAS	Ammar Batisha Mohd Noh
37	FW	MAS	Nazrul Afiq Tajidin
38	DF	MAS	Putra Luqman Nurhakeem

== Management ==
Management
Position	Name
Head coach	(Malaysia) Syamsul Saad
Assistant coach	(Malaysia) Mohd Fahmi bin Tajuid
Goalkeeper coach	(Malaysia) Mohd Zamzuri bin Mohamad Noor
Fitness coach	(Malaysia) Shafizal Haiqal Bin Shahrizal
Physio	(Malaysia) Ahmad Aidil Wajdi
Team admin	(Malaysia) Muhammad Rafiq Faeez Muhammad Fuad
Kitman	(Malaysia) Muhammad Hafiz Bin Zul

== Coaches ==
Name	Period	Trophies		Total
Name	Period	Domestic		Total
Name	Period	PP	PB	Total
(Malaysia) YM Raja Azlan Shah Raja So'ib	2006–2008	1	1	2
(Malaysia) Chong Yee Fatt	2009–2010	1	1	2
(Malaysia) Abu Bakar Fadzim	2011–2012	1	1	2
Total	2006–2012	3	3	3

== Kit suppliers ==
- Umbro (2001)
- Diadora (2002–2005)
- Joma (2006–2009)
- SPECS (2009–2011)
- Kika (2012)

== Honours ==
=== U21 team ===
- President's Cup

Winners (3): 2006–07, 2012, 2014
Runners-up (2): 2007–08, 2013

=== U19 team ===
- Youth League

Winners (1): 2012

== See also ==
- Perak FA state football team
