= Bukit Jalil Sports School =

Malaysian sports school

Sekolah Sukan Bukit Jalil

Location
- Bukit Jalil; Kuala Lumpur, Federal Territory of Kuala Lumpur, 57000; Malaysia; 3.0508°N 101.6943°E

Information
- Type: Sports school
- Established: 1996; 30 years ago
- Principal: Asmad bin Ahmad
- Gender: Coeducational
- Colours: blue, red and yellow
- Affiliation: Ministry of Education; Sekolah Sukan Tunku Mahkota Ismail; Sekolah Sukan Malaysia Pahang; Sekolah Sukan Malaysia Sabah
- Website: bjss.edu.my

The Bukit Jalil Sports School (BJSS) (Malay: Sekolah Sukan Bukit Jalil, SSBJ) is the pioneer elite national sports school in Malaysia. The school is located at the National Sports Complex compound in Bukit Jalil, Kuala Lumpur.

Sekolah Sukan Bukit Jalil was opened in 1996 and the pioneers were only Form One and Form Four students.

Ex-sprinter and former Sportswoman of the Years Marina Chin became head teacher in 2007.

== Notable alumni ==
- Bryan Nickson Lomas, diver
- Cheong Jun Hoong, diver
- Pandelela Rinong, diver
- Nur Dhabitah Sabri, diver
- Norshahrul Idlan Talaha, footballer
- Mohd Asraruddin Putra Omar, footballer
- Mohd Shakir Shaari, footballer
- Nazmi Faiz, footballer
- Wan Zack Haikal Wan Noor, footballer
- Khairul Fahmi Che Mat, footballer
- Aaron Chia, badminton player
- Goh Liu Ying, badminton player
- Tan Boon Heong, badminton player
- Junaidi Arif, badminton player
- Lee Zii Jia, badminton player
- Leong Jun Hao, badminton player
- Man Wei Chong, badminton player
- Muhammad Haikal, badminton player
- Soh Wooi Yik, badminton player
- Tee Kai Wun, badminton player
- Loh Le Quan, badminton player
- Pearly Tan, badminton player
- Thinaah Muralitharan, badminton player
- Syed Mohd Agil Syed Naguib, tennis player
- Loo Phay Xing, gymnast
- Farah Ann Abdul Hadi, gymnast
- Azizulhasni Awang, track cyclist
- Muhammad Shah Firdaus Sahrom, track cyclist
- Welson Sim, swimmer
- Phee Jinq En, swimmer
- Lee Hup Wei, high jumper
- Muhammad Hakimi Ismail, triple jumper
- Nauraj Singh Randhawa, high jumper
- Muhammad Irfan Shamshuddin, discus thrower
- Abdul Latif Romly, long jumper
- Khairul Hafiz Jantan, sprinter
- Azroy Hazalwafie, weightlifter
- Aznil Bidin, weightlifter
- Mohamad Fazrul Azrie Mohdad, weightlifter
- Mohamad Aniq Kasdan, weightlifter

== See also ==
- Harimau Muda A
- Harimau Muda B
- Harimau Muda C
- Malaysia Pahang Sports School
