= 2026 Liga Remaja Kebangsaan =

Football league in Malaysia

Tournament details
- Country: Malaysia
- Dates: 6 June – 8 December 2026
- Teams: 34
- All statistics correct as of 31 May 2026.

The 2026 Liga Remaja Kebangsaan (transl. National Youth League) is the inaugural season of the Liga Remaja Kebangsaan (LRK), the premier national youth football league in Malaysia. The tournament is co-organized by the Football Association of Malaysia (FAM) and the National Sports Council of Malaysia (MSN). The league serves as a foundational platform for the National Football Development Programme of Malaysia (NFDP), aiming to streamline talent identification and provide competitive match minutes for elite youth players across the country.

== Domestic synergy ==
The competition operates in tandem with localized state-level youth leagues. Affiliate bodies, such as the Negeri Sembilan Football Association (PBNS) partnering with Negeri Sembilan FC, launched parallel competitions like the Liga Remaja Negeri Sembilan 2026 to act as direct feeder systems to the national platform.

== Venue ==
All matches throughout the tournament are hosted centrally at a single location at Mokhtar Dahari National Football Academy (AMD), located in Gambang, Pahang.

== Format ==
The tournament structure is split into two distinct stages:

- League phase:
  - The league phase takes place over a five-month period, with matches played exclusively on weekends (Saturdays and Sundays). It is scheduled to run from 6 June to 8 November 2026. Teams play in a round-robin format within their respective age categories to determine seeding for the knockout stage.
- Finals phase:
  - The tournament concludes with a centralized, continuous 11-day knockout tournament. It is scheduled to take place from 28 November to 8 December 2026 to crown the national champions of each division.

== Schedule ==
The schedule of the competition was as follows.

Schedule for 2026 Liga Remaja Kebangsaan
Phase	Number of fixtures	Date
First registration window
Registration window		15 – 25 May 2026
League stage
League stage	25–29	6 June – 8 November 2026
Knock-out stage
Quarter-finals	4	28 November 2026
Semi-finals	2	December 2026
Final	1	8 December 2026

== Team ==
A total of 34 teams participate in the 2026 edition, distributed across three age-group categories:Under-12 (B-12): 12 teams Under-15 (B-15): 12 teams Under-16 (B-16): 10 teams Participating entities include state football associations, club academies, and developmental invitationals. Notably, the Malaysian Malay's Football Association (PBMM) enters squads across all three age brackets.

== Under-12 ==
Liga Remaja Kebangsaan (U-12)
- Season: 2026
- Champions: FA Terengganu
- Runner up: Selangor

=== Standings ===
Pos	Team	Pld	W	D	L	GF	GA	GD	Pts	Qualification or relegation
1	Football Association of Terengganu (C)	22	19	2	1	53	12	+41	59	League Champion
2	Selangor	22	19	1	2	92	11	+81	58	
3	Football Association of Selangor	22	16	4	2	67	16	+51	52	
4	Negeri Sembilan	22	12	4	6	50	22	+28	40	
5	Perak Football Association	22	9	6	7	35	29	+6	33	
6	Sime Darby	22	7	5	10	20	36	−16	26	
7	Melaka Football Association	22	7	3	12	25	41	−16	24	
8	Malaysian Malay's Football Association	22	6	5	11	21	34	−13	23	
9	PDRM	22	6	4	12	22	34	−12	22	
10	Rhino Pahang	22	5	3	14	25	49	−24	18	
11	Malaysian Armed Forces Football Association	22	5	1	16	19	63	−44	16	
12	Kuala Lumpur Football Association	22	2	0	20	12	94	−82	6	

Updated to match(es) played on 15 November 2026. Source: FAM-CMS
Rules for classification: 1) Points; 2) Goal difference; 3) Number of goals scored.
(C) League Champion

== Under-15 ==
Liga Remaja Kebangsaan (U-15)
- Season: 2026
- Champions: AMD U14
- Runner up: FA Terengganu

=== Standings ===
Pos	Team	Pld	W	D	L	GF	GA	GD	Pts	Qualification or relegation
1	AMD U14 (C)	22	19	2	1	86	14	+72	59	League Champion
2	Football Association of Terengganu	22	19	2	1	62	12	+50	59	
3	FELDA Football Academy	22	16	1	5	57	23	+34	49	
4	SSBJ	22	12	4	6	49	25	+24	40	
5	Melaka Football Association	22	10	4	8	43	37	+6	34	
6	Rhino Pahang	22	10	2	10	44	53	−9	32	
7	KLFA-RY	22	9	1	12	27	36	−9	28	
8	Malaysian Indian Football Association	22	7	3	12	35	56	−21	24	
9	Malaysian Malay's Football Association	22	6	2	14	26	49	−23	20	
10	AMD U13	22	5	2	15	35	65	−30	17	
11	Selangor	22	4	4	14	39	56	−17	16	
12	PDRM	22	1	1	20	6	83	−77	4	

Updated to match(es) played on 21 June 2026. Source: FAM-CMS
Rules for classification: 1) Points; 2) Goal difference; 3) Number of goals scored.
(C) League Champion

== Under-16 ==
Liga Remaja Kebangsaan (U-16)
- Season: 2026
- Champions: AMD U16
- Runner up: FA Terengganu
- Matches: 90
- Top goalscorer: Yusuf Nasrullah (AMD U16, 11 goals)

=== Standings ===
Pos	Team	Pld	W	D	L	GF	GA	GD	Pts	Qualification or relegation
1	AMD U16 (C)	18	17	1	0	56	9	+47	52	League Champion
2	Football Association of Terengganu	18	12	3	3	41	9	+32	39	
3	AMD U15	18	11	2	5	47	24	+23	35	
4	Football Association Penang	18	8	5	5	32	22	+10	29	
5	Selangor	18	8	3	7	28	33	−5	27	
6	Malaysian Malay's Football Association	18	7	1	10	31	31	0	22	
7	Football Association of Selangor	18	6	2	10	25	38	−13	20	
8	Sime Darby	18	4	1	13	21	53	−32	13	
9	Rhino Pahang	18	4	1	13	30	67	−37	13	
10	Kuala Lumpur Football Association	18	3	1	14	12	37	−25	10	

Updated to match(es) played on 29 Oct 2026. Source: FAM-CMS
Rules for classification: 1) Points; 2) Goal difference; 3) Number of goals scored.
(C) League Champion

== See also ==
- 2026–27 Piala Presiden
- 2026–27 Piala Belia
