= 2026 Liga Puteri-FAM =

Football league in Malaysia

2026 Liga Puteri
Tournament details
- Country: Malaysia
- Dates: 25 April–4 July 2026
- Teams: 20
- All statistics correct as of 2 April 2026.

The 2026 Liga Puteri-FAM (transl. FAM-Girls League) is the fourth edition of the Liga Puteri, women's football league in Malaysia for female players under the age of 16. It is run by the Football Association of Malaysia. SSS Leopard are the defending Elite Division champions. 20 teams compete, divided into Elite and Division 1.

== Format ==
The tournament is played as follows:

- League level: 20 teams are divided into two divisions, namely the Elite Division and Division 1.
- Elite Division:
  - League Structure and Matches: Each of the 8 teams competes in a league (likely single round-robin tournament or single round-robin format) — playing at PKNS Sports Complex, Kelana Jaya.
- Division 1: Divided into two groups of 6, each team will play single round-robin format at PKNS Sports Complex, Kelana Jaya. Top two teams will advance to the knockout stage.
  - Knockout stage: The knockout stage is the match to determine the winner. Finalists will be promoted to the Elite Division next season.

== Teams ==
The following teams were participating in the 2026 Liga Puteri-FAM.

=== Elite Division ===
- (Kuala Lumpur) Havana FC
- Perak FA
- Selangor
- (Selangor) Sime Darby
- (Pahang) SSMP
- (Sabah) SSMS Phoenix
- (Selangor) SSS Leopard FC
- (Selangor) Velocity Academy

=== Division 1 ===
- (Selangor) BTB Tiger FC
- (Kuala Lumpur) Future FA
- (Selangor) Junior Bangi FC
- (Kuala Lumpur) KL Rangers
- (Negeri Sembilan) MBS Nilai City
- Negeri Sembilan
- Penang Indian FC
- (Selangor) Perlima United
- (Johor) Pineapple South Vanguard
- Putrajaya Tigress
- Selangor Soccer School
- (Perak) Starbright SC

== Elite Division ==
Liga Puteri-FAM (Elite Division)
- Season: 2026
- Champions: SSS Leopard FC
- Relegated: Perak FA; Sime Darby
- Matches: 28
- Top goalscorer: Nur Laila Syamila (SSS Leopard, 9 goals)

=== Team changes ===
To Elite Division

Promoted from Division 1

- SSM Pahang

New Team

- Perak FA

From Elite Division

Relegated to Division 1

- None

Withdrew

- Real CJ
- FEMI9 FC

=== Standings ===
Pos	Team	Pld	W	D	L	GF	GA	GD	Pts	Qualification or relegation
1	SSS Leopard FC (C)	7	6	1	0	27	1	+26	19	
2	SSMS Phoenix	7	6	0	1	25	4	+21	18	
3	Havana FC	7	4	1	2	17	12	+5	13	
4	Selangor	7	3	3	1	14	9	+5	12	
5	SSMP	7	3	1	3	11	11	0	10	
6	Velocity Academy	7	2	0	5	10	14	−4	6	
7	Perak FA	7	1	0	6	2	22	−20	3	Relegation to Division 1
8	Sime Darby	7	0	0	7	0	33	−33	0	Relegation to Division 1

Updated to match(es) played on 6 July 2026. Source: FAM-CMS
Rules for classification: 1) Points; 2) Goal difference; 3) Number of goals scored.
(C) League Champion

=== Season statistics ===
==== Top goalscorers (Elite Division) ====
As of 4 July 2026

Rank	Player	Team	Goals
1	(Malaysia) Nur Laila Syamila	SSS Leopard	9
2	(Malaysia) Nuraleysah Jainuddin	SSMS Phoenix	8
3	(Malaysia) Isabella O'Luanaigh	KL Havana	7
3	(Malaysia) Batrisyia Faliha	Selangor	7
5	(Malaysia) Qaseh Riana Dafira	KL Havana	5
5	(Malaysia) Nina binti Hasmaji	SSMS Phoenix	5
7	(Malaysia) Hanneysta Allegra	SSMS Phoenix	4
7	(Malaysia) Aisyah Nur Iman	SSS Leopard	4
7	(Malaysia) Nur Qistina Faiz	SSS Leopard	4
7	(Malaysia) Kyra Zalia Hani	Velocity Academy	4

== Division 1 ==
Liga Puteri-FAM (Division 1)
- Season: 2026
- Champions: Penang Indian FC
- Promoted: Penang Indian FC; Perlima United
- Matches: 34
- Top goalscorer: Danushri A/P Anbarasan (Penang Indian FC, 15 goals)

=== Team changes ===
To Division 1

Relegated from Elite Division

- None

New Team

- Penang Indian FC
- Pineapple South Vanguard
- Putrajaya Tigress
- BTP Tiger FC
- Future FA
- MBS Nilai City FC
- Perlima United
- Starbright SC

From Division 1

Promoted to Elite Division

- SSM Pahang

Withdrew

- Starbite FC
- Anak Sejati FC
- Medanian Titanic FC

=== Group stage ===
==== Group A ====
Pos	Team	Pld	W	D	L	GF	GA	GD	Pts	Qualification or relegation
1	Penang Indian FC (C)	5	4	1	0	18	5	+13	13	Advance to Knock-out stage
2	Negeri Sembilan	5	3	1	1	14	7	+7	10	Advance to Knock-out stage
3	Pineapple South Vanguard	5	2	2	1	10	2	+8	8	
4	Junior Bangi FC	5	1	1	3	5	12	−7	4	
5	KL Rangers	5	1	1	3	3	10	−7	4	
6	Putrajaya Tigress	5	1	0	4	5	19	−14	3	

Updated to match(es) played on 14 June 2026. Source: FAM-CMS
Rules for classification: 1) Points; 2) Goal difference; 3) Number of goals scored.
(C) League Champion

==== Group B ====
Pos	Team	Pld	W	D	L	GF	GA	GD	Pts	Qualification or relegation
1	Perlima United	5	5	0	0	25	1	+24	15	Advance to Knock-out stage
2	Future FA	5	3	1	1	12	4	+8	10	Advance to Knock-out stage
3	Selangor Soccer School	5	3	1	1	5	6	−1	10	
4	MBS Nilai City FC	5	2	0	3	5	12	−7	6	
5	Starbright SC	5	1	0	4	3	12	−9	3	
6	BTP Tiger FC	5	0	0	5	1	16	−15	0	

Updated to match(es) played on 14 June 2026. Source: FAM-CMS
Rules for classification: 1) Points; 2) Goal difference; 3) Number of goals scored.

=== Knock-out stage ===
Semifinals
1A	Penang Indian FC	6
2B	Future FA	0
1B	Perlima United	3
2A	Negeri Sembilan FC	1

Final
Penang Indian FC	3
Perlima United	2
Third place play-off
Future FA	2 (4)
Negeri Sembilan FC	2 (3)

==== Semi-finals ====
21 June 2026	Penang Indian FC	6–0	Future FA	Kelana Jaya
17:00 UTC+8		Report		Stadium: PKNS Sports Complex Football B Field

21 June 2026	Perlima United	3–1	Negeri Sembilan FC	Kelana Jaya
17:00 UTC+8		Report		Stadium: PKNS Sports Complex Football A Field

==== Third place play-off ====
28 June 2026	Future FA	2–2 (4–3 p)	Negeri Sembilan FC	Kelana Jaya
17:00 UTC+8		Report		Stadium: PKNS Sports Complex Football A Field

==== Final ====
28 June 2026	Penang Indian FC	3–2	Perlima United	Kelana Jaya
20:30 UTC+8		Report		Stadium: PKNS Sports Complex Football A Field

=== Season statistics ===
==== Top goalscorers (Division 1) ====
As of 14 June 2026

Rank	Player	Team	Goals
1	(Malaysia) Danushri A/P Anbarasan	Penang Indian	10
2	(Malaysia) Khadra Firdya	Perlima United	7
3	(Malaysia) Putri Dhia Natasya	PSV FC	6
4	(Malaysia) Dhiya Batrisyia	Future FA	5
4	(Malaysia) Qaseh Damia Irdina	Perlima United	5
6	(Malaysia) Kishayini Sivakumar	Penang Indian	4
6	(Malaysia) Marissa Hazwani	Negeri Sembilan	4
6	(Malaysia) Nur Alfira Damia	Negeri Sembilan	4
6	(Malaysia) Azzalea Syamimi	Perlima United	4
6	(Malaysia) Dhia Darwisyah	Perlima United	4
6	(Malaysia) Nurdania Qaisara	Selangor Soccer School	4

== See also ==
- 2026–27 Piala Presiden
- 2026–27 Piala Belia
