= 2024 Liga Puteri-FAM =

Football league in Malaysia

2024 Liga Puteri
Tournament details
- Country: Malaysia
- Dates: 27 April–22 June 2024
- Teams: 9

Final positions
- Champions: SSS Leopard FC
- Runners-up: Velocity Academy

Tournament statistics
- Matches played: 36
- All statistics correct as of 22 June 2024.

The 2024 Liga Puteri-FAM (transl. FAM-Girls League) was the second edition of the Liga Puteri tournament for female players under the age of 16, one of the women's football leagues in Malaysia. It is run by the Football Association of Malaysia. Kelana United were the defending champions.

== Teams ==
The following teams participated in the 2024 Liga Puteri-FAM.

- (Kuala Lumpur) Afza FC
- (Selangor) Anak Sejati FC
- (Perak) FEMI9 FC
- (Selangor) Junior Bangi FC
- (Malacca) Melaka FA
- (Penang) Real CJ
- (Selangor) Sime Darby
- (Selangor) SSS Leopard FC
- (Selangor) Velocity Academy

== Standings ==
Pos	Team	Pld	W	D	L	GF	GA	GD	Pts	Qualification or relegation
1	SSS Leopard FC (C)	8	7	0	1	27	2	+25	21	Promoted to Liga Puteri-FAM Elite Division
2	Velocity Academy	8	6	2	0	37	5	+32	20	Promoted to Liga Puteri-FAM Elite Division
3	Melaka FA	8	5	2	1	20	4	+16	17	Withdrawn end of season
4	Real CJ	8	5	0	3	19	11	+8	15	Qualification to Liga Puteri-FAM Qualification Stage
5	FEMI9 FC	8	4	0	4	17	8	+9	12	Qualification to Liga Puteri-FAM Qualification Stage
6	Sime Darby	8	2	3	3	8	9	−1	9	Qualification to Liga Puteri-FAM Qualification Stage
7	Afza FC	8	2	0	6	8	14	−6	6	Withdrawn end of season
8	Anak Sejati FC	8	1	0	7	1	53	−52	3	Qualification to Liga Puteri-FAM Qualification Stage
9	Junior Bangi FC	8	0	1	7	2	33	−31	1	Qualification to Liga Puteri-FAM Qualification Stage

Updated to match(es) played on 22 June 2024. Source: FAM-CMS
Rules for classification: 1) Points; 2) Goal difference; 3) Number of goals scored.
(C) League Champion

== Season statistics ==
=== Top goalscorers ===
As of 22 June 2024

Rank	Player	Team	Goals
1	Putri Mia Alysa Binti Ahmad Zakiyamani	Velocity Academy	10
2	Qaseh Damia Irdina Mohd Fauzi	Melaka FA	7
2	Nur Ummairah Bt Muhamad Soberi	Real CJ FC	7
2	Batrisyia Faliha Binti Mohd Faizal	Velocity Academy	7

== See also ==
- 2024–25 Piala Presiden (Malaysia)
- 2024–25 Piala Belia
