= 2020 Piala Presiden (Malaysia) =

2020 Piala Presiden 2020
2020 Malaysia President Cup

Tournament details
- Country: Malaysia
- Dates: 24 February – 30 July
- Teams: 21

Final positions
- Champions: None; cancelled and declared null and void

Tournament statistics
- Matches played: 40
- Goals scored: 106 (2.65 per match)
- All statistics correct as of 12 March 2020.

The 2020 Piala Presiden (transl. President Cup) is the 36th season of the Piala Presiden since its establishment in 1985. The league is currently the youth level (U21) football league in Malaysia. PKNS FC U21 are the defending champions. 21 teams competed in this season. All teams were drawn into two zone, and plays in a maximum of 22 home-and-away matches. Top eight teams after the completion of group stage matches progressed to knockout stage.

== Teams ==
The following teams were participating in the 2020 Piala Presiden.

Group A (Northern Zone)

- AMD U17
- Felda United U21
- Kedah U21
- Kelantan U21
- Kelantan United U21
- Pahang U21
- PDRM U21
- Perak III
- Pulau Pinang U21
- Terengganu III

Group B (Southern Zone)

- Johor Darul Ta'zim III
- Kuala Lumpur U21
- Kuching FA U21
- Melaka U21
- Negeri Sembilan U21
- PJ City U21
- Sabah U21
- Sarawak United U21
- Selangor U21
- UiTM U21
- UKM U21

== League table ==
=== Group A ===
Pos	Team	Pld	W	D	L	GF	GA	GD	Pts	Qualification
1	Terengganu III	4	3	1	0	14	1	+13	10	Knockout stage
2	Perak III	4	3	1	0	8	1	+7	10	Knockout stage
3	Pulau Pinang U21	4	3	1	0	9	3	+6	10	Knockout stage
4	Kedah U21	4	2	1	1	5	6	−1	7	Knockout stage
5	Kelantan United U21	4	1	2	1	3	5	−2	5	Knockout stage
6	Felda United U21	4	1	1	2	3	4	−1	4	Knockout stage
7	Kelantan U21	4	1	1	2	3	8	−5	4	Knockout stage
8	AMD U17	4	0	2	2	3	11	−8	2	Knockout stage
9	PDRM U21	4	0	1	3	3	7	−4	1	
10	Pahang U21	4	0	1	3	1	6	−5	1	

Updated to match(es) played on 12 March 2020. Source: FAM, Liga Malaysia
Rules for classification: 1) Points; 2) Goal difference; 3) Number of goals scored.

=== Group B ===
Pos	Team	Pld	W	D	L	GF	GA	GD	Pts	Qualification
1	UiTM U21	3	3	0	0	7	1	+6	9	Knockout stage
2	Kuching FA U21	4	3	0	1	8	4	+4	9	Knockout stage
3	Kuala Lumpur U21	4	3	0	1	5	6	−1	9	Knockout stage
4	Negeri Sembilan U21	4	2	1	1	7	2	+5	7	Knockout stage
5	Johor Darul Ta'zim III	4	2	1	1	5	4	+1	7	Knockout stage
6	Sabah U21	4	2	0	2	9	5	+4	6	Knockout stage
7	Selangor U21	3	2	0	1	6	4	+2	6	Knockout stage
8	Sarawak United U21	3	1	1	1	4	6	−2	4	Knockout stage
9	PJ City U21	4	0	1	3	1	5	−4	1	
10	Melaka U21	4	0	0	4	0	8	−8	0	
11	UKM U21	3	0	0	3	1	10	−9	0	

Updated to match(es) played on 12 March 2020. Source: FAM, Liga Malaysia
Rules for classification: 1) Points; 2) Goal difference; 3) Number of goals scored.

== Result table ==
=== Group A ===
Home \ Away	AMD	FEL	KED	KEL	KEU	PAH	PDRM	PRK	PEN	TER
AMD U17								0–3	1–1	
Felda United U21							2–0			
Kedah U21		1–0				1–1				
Kelantan U21			1–2							1–6
Kelantan United U21		1–1		0–0						
Pahang U21					0–1					
PDRM U21	2–2			0–1					1–2	
Perak III			4–1			1–0				0–0
Pulau Pinang U21		2–0			4–1					
Terengganu III	5–0					3–0				

Updated to match(es) played on 12 March 2020. Source: FAM
Legend: Blue = home team win; Yellow = draw; Red = away team win.

=== Group B ===
Home \ Away	JDT	KLU	KUC	MEL	NSE	PJC	SAB	SWU	SEL	UITM	UKM
Johor Darul Ta'zim III				1–0			1–1				
Kuala Lumpur U21							2–1				
Kuching FA U21		3–1				1–0					
Melaka U21			0–2								
Negeri Sembilan U21		0–1		4–0							
PJ City U21	1–2				0–0						
Sabah U21				1–0					2–3		5–0
Sarawak United U21			3–2							0–3	
Selangor U21		1–2									
UiTM U21	2–1					2–0					
UKM U21					1–3				0–2		

Updated to match(es) played on 12 March 2020. Source: FAM
Legend: Blue = home team win; Yellow = draw; Red = away team win.

== See also ==
- 2020 Piala Belia
