= 2019 Piala Presiden (Malaysia) =

Football league in Malaysia

2019 Piala Presiden 2019
2019 Malaysia President Cup

Tournament details
- Country: Malaysia
- Dates: 21 February – 30 September
- Teams: 22

Final positions
- Champions: PKNS U21 (1st title)
- Runners-up: Perak U21

Tournament statistics
- Matches played: 236
- Goals scored: 545 (2.31 per match)
- All statistics correct as of 30 September 2019.

The 2019 Piala Presiden (transl. President Cup) was the 35th season of the Piala Presiden since its establishment in 1985. The league is currently the youth level (U21) football league in Malaysia. Terengganu III are the defending champions. 22 teams competed in this season. All teams were drawn into two different groups, and plays in a maximum of 22 home-and-away matches. Top four teams after the completion of group stage matches progressed to knockout stage.

== Teams ==
The following teams were participating in the 2019 Piala Presiden.

Group A

- Armed Forces U21
- Johor Darul Ta'zim III
- Kedah U21
- Pahang U21
- PJ City U21
- Pulau Pinang U21
- Sabah U21
- Selangor U21
- Selangor United U21
- UiTM U21
- ~~Perlis U21~~

Group B

- AMD U17
- Felda United U21
- Kelantan U21
- Kuala Lumpur U21
- Melaka U21
- Negeri Sembilan U21
- Perak U21
- PDRM U21
- PKNP U21
- PKNS U21
- Sarawak U21
- Terengganu III

== League table ==
=== Group A ===
| Pos | Team | Pld | W | D | L | GF | GA | GD | Pts | Qualification |
|---|---|---|---|---|---|---|---|---|---|---|
| 1 | Johor DT III | 18 | 10 | 5 | 3 | 31 | 15 | +16 | 35 | Knockout Stage |
| 2 | PJ City U21 | 18 | 9 | 6 | 3 | 21 | 13 | +8 | 33 | Knockout Stage |
| 3 | Selangor U21 | 18 | 8 | 7 | 3 | 22 | 13 | +9 | 31 | Knockout Stage |
| 4 | UiTM U21 | 18 | 10 | 1 | 7 | 23 | 24 | −1 | 31 | Knockout Stage |
| 5 | Sabah U21 | 18 | 9 | 3 | 6 | 26 | 15 | +11 | 30 | |
| 6 | Kedah U21 | 18 | 8 | 4 | 6 | 25 | 14 | +11 | 28 | |
| 7 | Selangor United U21 | 18 | 6 | 3 | 9 | 24 | 27 | −3 | 21 | |
| 8 | Pulau Pinang U21 | 18 | 6 | 3 | 9 | 23 | 26 | −3 | 21 | |
| 9 | Pahang U21 | 18 | 5 | 4 | 9 | 19 | 26 | −7 | 19 | |
| 10 | Armed Forces U21 | 18 | 1 | 0 | 17 | 4 | 45 | −41 | 3 | |

Source: FAM, Liga Malaysia
Rules for classification: 1) Points; 2) Goal difference; 3) Number of goals scored.

=== Group B ===
| Pos | Team | Pld | W | D | L | GF | GA | GD | Pts | Qualification |
|---|---|---|---|---|---|---|---|---|---|---|
| 1 | Perak U21 | 22 | 15 | 7 | 0 | 40 | 7 | +33 | 52 | Knockout Stage |
| 2 | PKNS U21 | 22 | 15 | 5 | 2 | 42 | 20 | +22 | 50 | Knockout Stage |
| 3 | Terengganu III | 22 | 14 | 3 | 5 | 39 | 14 | +25 | 45 | Knockout Stage |
| 4 | PKNP U21 | 22 | 11 | 7 | 4 | 33 | 14 | +19 | 40 | Knockout Stage |
| 5 | AMD U17 | 22 | 11 | 4 | 7 | 30 | 19 | +11 | 37 | |
| 6 | Kuala Lumpur U21 | 22 | 9 | 8 | 5 | 23 | 15 | +8 | 35 | |
| 7 | Negeri Sembilan U21 | 22 | 6 | 8 | 8 | 20 | 18 | +2 | 26 | |
| 8 | Felda United U21 | 22 | 6 | 3 | 13 | 24 | 34 | −10 | 21 | |
| 9 | Sarawak U21 | 22 | 5 | 3 | 14 | 16 | 30 | −14 | 18 | |
| 10 | Melaka U21 | 22 | 5 | 2 | 15 | 17 | 37 | −20 | 17 | |
| 11 | Kelantan U21 | 22 | 3 | 6 | 13 | 16 | 42 | −26 | 15 | |
| 12 | PDRM U21 | 22 | 2 | 4 | 16 | 8 | 58 | −50 | 10 | |

Source: FAM, Liga Malaysia
Rules for classification: 1) Points; 2) Goal difference; 3) Number of goals scored.

== Result table ==
=== Group A ===
| Home \ Away | ARF | JDT | KED | PAH | PJC | PEN | SAB | SEL | SEU | UiTM |
|---|---|---|---|---|---|---|---|---|---|---|
| Armed Forces U21 | — | 0–2 | 0–3 | 2–1 | 0–1 | 0–4 | 0–3 | 0–2 | 0–2 | 1–2 |
| Johor DT III | 3–0 | — | 3–0 | 2–1 | 2–2 | 2–1 | 4–2 | 0–0 | 0–0 | 0–1 |
| Kedah U21 | 3–0 | 1–1 | — | 4–0 | 1–1 | 3–0 | 0–0 | 0–1 | 2–0 | 3–1 |
| Pahang U21 | 1–0 | 0–3 | 1–0 | — | 1–1 | 0–1 | 0–2 | 1–1 | 2–2 | 1–2 |
| PJ City U21 | 3–0 | 3–1 | 0–1 | 0–0 | — | 0–0 | 1–0 | 2–1 | 2–1 | 0–1 |
| Pulau Pinang U21 | 3–1 | 1–2 | 2–1 | 1–3 | 0–1 | — | 0–3 | 0–2 | 1–0 | 5–0 |
| Sabah U21 | 1–0 | 0–0 | 0–1 | 0–1 | 2–0 | 2–0 | — | 2–2 | 3–0 | 3–1 |
| Selangor U21 | 4–0 | 0–2 | 0–0 | 2–1 | 0–0 | 1–1 | 1–2 | — | 2–1 | 0–0 |
| Selangor United U21 | 5–0 | 1–3 | 2–1 | 2–1 | 1–2 | 2–2 | 3–1 | 1–2 | — | 0–3 |
| UiTM U21 | 2–0 | 2–1 | 2–1 | 1–4 | 1–2 | 3–1 | 1–0 | 0–1 | 0–1 | — |

Updated to match(es) played on 29 July 2019. Source: FAM
Legend: Blue = home team win; Yellow = draw; Red = away team win.

=== Group B ===
| Home \ Away | AMD | FEL | KEL | KUL | MEL | NSE | PDRM | PRK | PKNP | PKNS | SAR | TER |
|---|---|---|---|---|---|---|---|---|---|---|---|---|
| AMD U17 | — | 2–0 | 3–0 | 1–1 | 2–0 | 1–1 | 0–1 | 0–1 | 0–2 | 1–2 | 2–0 | 2–1 |
| Felda United U21 | 0–3 | — | 4–0 | 0–1 | 0–1 | 1–3 | 2–0 | 1–2 | 1–4 | 1–1 | 3–2 | 0–3 |
| Kelantan U21 | 2–0 | 3–3 | — | 0–1 | 1–2 | 1–1 | 2–0 | 0–1 | 2–2 | 0–2 | 1–0 | 1–3 |
| Kuala Lumpur U21 | 0–1 | 0–0 | 2–2 | — | 1–0 | 1–0 | 3–0 | 0–0 | 0–1 | 0–0 | 2–0 | 1–2 |
| Melaka U21 | 0–1 | 0–1 | 1–0 | 1–2 | — | 0–2 | 1–2 | 1–3 | 0–2 | 1–3 | 1–0 | 2–0 |
| Negeri Sembilan U21 | 1–1 | 0–1 | 1–0 | 0–0 | 2–0 | — | 4–2 | 1–1 | 0–0 | 0–1 | 3–1 | 0–1 |
| PDRM U21 | 0–4 | 0–3 | 0–0 | 0–3 | 1–4 | 0–0 | — | 0–6 | 0–4 | 0–2 | 0–1 | 0–7 |
| Perak U21 | 3–0 | 1–0 | 6–1 | 3–1 | 4–0 | 1–1 | 1–0 | — | 0–0 | 0–0 | 1–0 | 2–0 |
| PKNP U21 | 0–1 | 1–0 | 2–0 | 1–1 | 1–0 | 1–0 | 5–0 | 0–0 | — | 3–4 | 1–1 | 0–1 |
| PKNS U21 | 3–2 | 4–2 | 3–0 | 3–1 | 5–4 | 1–0 | 0–0 | 1–1 | 3–1 | — | 2–0 | 0–1 |
| Sarawak U21 | 1–1 | 2–1 | 0–0 | 0–2 | 3–0 | 1–0 | 3–1 | 0–2 | 0–2 | 0–2 | — | 1–2 |
| Terengganu III | 0–2 | 1–0 | 5–0 | 0–0 | 1–1 | 2–0 | 6–1 | 0–1 | 0–0 | 2–0 | 1–0 | — |

Updated to match(es) played on 29 July 2019. Source: FAM
Legend: Blue = home team win; Yellow = draw; Red = away team win.

== Knock-out stage ==
=== Bracket ===
Quarter-finals
Selangor U21 | 0 | 0 | 0
PKNS U21 | 0 | 1 | 1
PKNP U21 | 0 | 0 | 0(2)
Johor DT III (p) | 0 | 0 | 0(4)
Terengganu III | 0 | 2 | 2
PJ City U21 | 0 | 0 | 0
UiTM U21 | 1 | 1 | 2
Perak U21 | 3 | 1 | 4

Semi-Finals
PKNS U21 | 0 | 1 | 1
Johor DT III | 0 | 0 | 0
Terengganu III | 2 | 1 | 3 (0)
Perak U21 (p) | 1 | 2 | 3 (2)

Final
PKNS U21 | 2 | 0 | 2
Perak U21 | 0 | 1 | 1

== See also ==
- 2019 Piala Belia
