= Piala Presiden =

Piala Presiden may refer to one of two football competitions:

- Piala Presiden (Indonesia)
- Piala Presiden (Malaysia)
