= Shariman Che Omar =

Malaysian footballer

Personal information
- Full name: Shariman Che Omar
- Date of birth: 25 March 1980 (age 46)
- Place of birth: Kedah, Malaysia
- Height: 5 ft 6 in (1.68 m)
- Position: Defender

Team information
- Current team: PB Melayu Kedah
- Number: 18

Youth career
- Kedah FA President Cup

Senior career*
Years	Team	Apps	(Gls)
2001–2005	Kedah FA	17	(3)
2006–2007	Perlis FA	22	(2)
2007–2008	DPMM FC	18	(4)
2009–2010	Penang FA	25	(7)
2010–2011	Perlis FA	19	(4)
2011–2013	USM FC	32	(5)
2013–present	PB Melayu Kedah	1	(0)

International career
2004	Malaysia	1	(0)
- * Club domestic league appearances and goals

Shariman Che Omar (born 25 March 1980) is a Malaysian footballer. He was one of key figure for Kedah FA since joining from President Cup team and earn several call ups for national team selection since his arrival on the local football scene in 2001. With Malaysia, he made his only full international debut against Kuwait in 2006 World Cup qualifier on 17 November 2004.

After several season playing for his hometown team Kedah, and one season with Perlis, he moved to new pasture with DPMM FC and stay with them for one season. With the withdrawal of DPMM FC of Brunei for 2009 season after their deregistration by Sports Bodies in Brunei Darussalam, he returns to Malaysia and signed with Super League outfit, Penang FA. He joined M. Prakash and other players under the guidance of then Penang FA head coach, S. Veloo. For the 2010 season, he joined his old team Perlis.

He reunited with S.Veloo when he joined USM FC for their 2011 Malaysia Premier League campaign.
