= 2023 Piala Presiden (Malaysia) =

Piala Presiden 2023
Tournament details
- Country: Malaysia
- Dates: 16 May – 1 October 2023
- Teams: 16

Tournament statistics
- Matches played: 48
- Goals scored: 102 (2.13 per match)
- Attendance: 5,828 (121 per match)
- Top goal scorer(s): Harry Danish (4 gol)
- All statistics correct as of 28 May 2023.

Piala Presiden (Malaysia) 2023 (referred to as Piala Presdiden) is the 1st season of the Piala Presiden since its inception in 1986. This league is currently for the football league in Malaysia youth level (U21).

== Rules ==
=== Age limit ===
2023 Piala Presiden (Malaysia) is an amateur football competition in Malaysia for under-21 players. Since its inception in 1986, the Piala Presiden has been a major tournament for under-21 and under-23 players. In 2009, the format of the competition was changed with only under-20 players eligible to fill in for the tournament that. In 2015, the format of the competition reverted to its original format with players under 21.

=== Format ===
The tournament is played as follows:

- League level: 16 teams are divided into four groups, from Group A to Group D. Teams will play matches against the teams in their respective groups.
  - After 12 games in the group, the top two teams of each group qualify for league one, the remaining eight bottom teams of each group will be placed in league two.
- League level: 16 teams are divided into two group leagues, namely league one with eight teams and league two also with eight teams. Teams will play one single match with teams in their respective leagues, where the venue of the match will be determined by the organizers.
  - After the league matches, the top five teams from league one and two teams from league two along with the winner of the play-off between the 6th-placed team in league one and the 3rd-placed team in league two will advance to the quarter-finals.
- Knockout stage: The quarter-finals, semi-finals and finals will be played back-to-back.

== Team ==
The following teams will participate in the 2023 Malaysia President's Cup.

Team	Coach	Location
(Pahang) AMD U17	(Malaysia) Osmera Omaro	Gambang
Johor Darul Ta'zim III	(Spain) Gonzalo Zaballos	Pasir Gudang
Kedah Darul Aman C	(Malaysia) Khairul Ismail	Alor Setar
Kelantan	(Malaysia) Hasnan Ahmad	Kota Bharu
Kelantan United	(Malaysia) Sazami Shafi’i	Kota Bharu
Kuala Lumpur City	(Malaysia) Nidzam Adzha	Kuala Lumpur
(Sarawak) Kuching City	(Malaysia) Safri Amit	Kuching
(Malacca) Melaka	(Malaysia) Remeli Junit	Krubong
Negeri Sembilan	(Malaysia) Azlan Ahmad	Paroi
(Malaysia) PDRM	(Malaysia) Nadzim Din	Kuala Lumpur
(Penang) Pulau Pinang	(Malaysia) Rahim Hassan	Batu Kawan
Perak III	(Malaysia) K. Nanthakumar	Ipoh
Sabah	(Malaysia) Burhan Ajui	Penampang
Selangor B20	(Malaysia) irdaus Aziz	Salak Tinggi
Sri Pahang	(Malaysia) Yazeed Hamzah	Kuantan
Terengganu III	(Malaysia) Roshadi Wahab	Kuala Terengganu

== Table ==
The match schedule is as follows.

Phase	Round	First Match	Second Match
Group Stage	Matchday 1	16 May & 20 May 2023	
Group Stage	Matchday 2	21 May & 28 May 2023	
Group Stage	Matchday 3	3, 4 & 13 May 2023	
Group Stage	Matchday 4	10 May 2023	
Group Stage	Matchday 5	17 & 18 May 2023	
Group Stage	Matchday 6	24 May 2023	
League Stage	Matchday 1	6 & 7 July 2023	
League Stage	Matchday 2	12 July 2023	
League Stage	Matchday 3	19 July 2023	
League Stage	Matchday 4	26 July 2023	
League Stage	Matchday 5	2 August 2023	
League Stage	Matchday 6	8 & 9 August 2023	
League Stage	Matchday 7	16 & 17 August 2023	
Knock-out Stage	Quarter-finals	28 August 2023	4 September 2023
Knock-out Stage	Semi-finals	11 September 2023	18 September 2023
Knock-out Stage	Final	24 September 2023	1 October 2023

== Group Stage ==
=== Group A ===
Pos	Team	Pld	W	D	L	GF	GA	GD	Pts	Penyingkiran
1	Kedah Darul Aman C	6	4	2	0	7	2	+5	14	Qualify to League One
2	Terengganu III	6	3	1	2	7	5	+2	10	Qualify to League One
3	Kelantan United U21	6	3	0	3	4	5	−1	9	Qualify to League Two
4	Sri Pahang U21	6	0	1	5	1	7	−6	1	Qualify to League Two

Source: FAM-CMS
Rules for classification: 1) Points; 2) Goal difference; 3) Number of goals scored.

=== Group B ===
Pos	Team	Pld	W	D	L	GF	GA	GD	Pts	Penyingkiran
1	AMD U17	6	4	1	1	13	7	+6	13	Qualify to League One
2	Perak III	6	3	1	2	8	6	+2	10	Qualify to League One
3	Pulau Pinang U21	6	2	2	2	8	5	+3	8	Qualify to League Two
4	Kelantan U21 (Note: The FAM Disciplinary Committee decided that Perak III was given a 3-0 victory after the amended match on 20 May 2023 was canceled because the host, Kelantan U21 failed to provide a venue for the match.)	6	1	0	5	4	15	−11	3	Qualify to League Two

Source: FAM-CMS
Rules for classification: 1) Points; 2) Goal difference; 3) Number of goals scored.

=== Group C ===
Pos	Team	Pld	W	D	L	GF	GA	GD	Pts	Penyingkiran
1	Selangor U20	6	4	1	1	7	2	+5	13	Qualify to League One
2	Negeri Sembilan U21	6	3	2	1	10	2	+8	11	Qualify to League One
3	Kuala Lumpur City U21	6	3	1	2	7	8	−1	10	Qualify to League Two
4	Sabah U21	6	0	0	6	5	17	−12	0	Qualify to League Two

Source: FAM-CMS
Rules for classification: 1) Points; 2) Goal difference; 3) Number of goals scored.

=== Group D ===
Pos	Team	Pld	W	D	L	GF	GA	GD	Pts	Penyingkiran
1	Johor Darul Ta'zim III	6	5	0	1	12	1	+11	15	Qualify to League One
2	PDRM U21	6	3	2	1	5	1	+4	11	Qualify to League One
3	Melaka U21	6	1	1	4	3	9	−6	4	Qualify to League Two
4	Kuching City U21	6	1	1	4	2	11	−9	4	Qualify to League Two

Source: FAM-CMS
Rules for classification: 1) Points; 2) Goal difference; 3) Number of goals scored.

== League Stage ==
=== League One ===
Pos	Team	Pld	W	D	L	GF	GA	GD	Pts	Relegation
1	Johor Darul Ta'zim III	7	6	0	1	14	5	+9	18	Qualification to Knock-out Stage
2	Negeri Sembilan U21	7	4	2	1	10	5	+5	14	Qualification to Knock-out Stage
3	Selangor U20	7	4	2	1	10	7	+3	14	Qualification to Knock-out Stage
4	Perak III	7	4	0	3	11	7	+4	12	Qualification to Knock-out Stage
5	AMD U17	7	2	2	3	10	8	+2	8	Qualification to Knock-out Stage
6	Kedah Darul Aman C	7	2	1	4	5	9	−4	7	
7	Terengganu III	7	2	1	4	9	16	−7	7	
8	PDRM U21	7	0	0	7	2	14	−12	0	

First match(es) will be played: 18 August 2023. Source: MFL
Rules for classification: 1) Point; 2) Goal Difference; 3) Number of goals scored.

=== League Two ===
Pos	Team	Pld	W	D	L	GF	GA	GD	Pts	Relegation
1	Sri Pahang U21	7	5	1	1	17	6	+11	16	Qualification to Knock-out Stage
2	Kuala Lumpur City U21	7	5	0	2	16	8	+8	15	Qualification to Knock-out Stage
3	Kelantan United U21	7	4	3	0	10	2	+8	15	Qualification to Knock-out Stage
4	Pulau Pinang U21	7	3	1	3	14	9	+5	10	
5	Sabah U21	7	2	3	2	10	11	−1	9	
6	Melaka U21	7	2	1	4	7	9	−2	7	
7	Kuching City U21	7	2	1	4	8	12	−4	7	
8	Kelantan U21	7	0	0	7	8	33	−25	0	

First match(es) will be played: 18 August 2023. Source: MFL
Rules for classification: 1) Point; 2) Goal Difference; 3) Number of goals scored.

== Knock-out Stage ==
The quarter-finals, semi-finals and finals will be held on a reciprocal basis (home and away).

=== Bracket ===
Quarter-finals
Sri Pahang U21	0	0	0 (1)
Selangor U20	0	0	0 (4)
Kuala Lumpur City U21	2	1	3
Negeri Sembilan U21	2	4	6
AMD U17	0	1	1
Perak III	0	0	0
Kelantan United U21	0	0	0
Johor Darul Ta'zim III	1	0	1

Semi-finals
Selangor U20	1	2	3
Negeri Sembilan U21	3	0	3
AMD U17	2	0	2
Johor Darul Ta'zim III	2	4	6

Final
Negeri Sembilan U21	1
Johor Darul Ta'zim III	3

=== Quarter-final ===
Team 1	Agg.	Team 2	1st leg	2nd leg
Sri Pahang U21	(1) 0-0 (4)	Selangor U20	0-0	0-0
Kuala Lumpur City U21	3-6	Negeri Sembilan U21	2-2	1-4
AMD U17	1-0	Perak III	0-0	1-0
Kelantan United U21	0-1	Johor Darul Ta'zim III	0-0	0-1

28 August 2023
--:-- UTC+8

Sri Pahang U21	0-0	Selangor U20
	Report

Darulmakmur Stadium
Attendance: 269
Referee: Latiffi Zahrom
2023
--:-- UTC+8

v

"The winner on aggregate or penalty kicks or away goals rule advances to the semi-finals.

2023
--:-- UTC+8

v

2023
--:-- UTC+8

v

"The winner on aggregate or penalty kicks or away goals rule advances to the semi-finals.

2023
--:-- UTC+8

v

2023
--:-- UTC+8

v

"The winner on aggregate or penalty kicks or away goals rule advances to the semi-finals.

2023
--:-- UTC+8

v

2023
--:-- UTC+8

v

"The winner on aggregate or penalty kicks or away goals rule advances to the semi-finals.

=== Semifinals ===
Team 1	Agg.	Team 2	1st leg	2nd leg
TBD	TBD	TBD	TBD	TBD
TBD	TBD	TBD	TBD	TBD

2023
--:-- UTC+8

v

2023
--:-- UTC+8

v

Winners on aggregate or penalty kicks or away goals rule advance to the final stage.

2023
--:-- UTC+8

v

2023
--:-- UTC+8

v

Winners on aggregate or penalty kicks or away goals rule advance to the final stage.

== Finals ==
Team 1	Agg.	Team 2	1st leg	2nd leg
TBD	TBD	TBD	TBD	TBD

2023
--:-- UTC+8

v

2023
--:-- UTC+8

v

== Champion ==
Malaysia President Cup Champion

Johor Darul Ta'zim III
Third Title

== Top Scorer ==
As of 26 July 2023

Ked	Player	Club	Goal
1	Haziq Jaffry	Sabah U21	6
1	Harry Danish	Selangor U20	6
3	Afiq Hilman	Kuala Lumpur City U21	5
3	Khairil Faris	Kuala Lumpur City U21	5
5	Haiqal Khairuddin	Johor Darul Ta'zim III	4
5	Nashaika Ghazali	Kelantan U21	4
5	Ashraf Iqwan	Negeri Sembilan U21	4
5	Danish Syamer	Negeri Sembilan U21	4
5	Ammar Idzham	Perak III	4
10	Qahir Dzakirin	AMD U17	3
10	Fergus Tierney	Johor Darul Ta'zim III	3
10	Mubin Wahab	Negeri Sembilan U21	3
10	Aniq Afif	Pulau Pinang U21	3
10	Ajwad Akhari	Sabah U21	3
10	Danial Zhafirul	Terengganu III	3
10	Danish Hakim	Terengganu III	3
