= 2020 Piala Belia =

2020 Piala Belia 2020
2020 Malaysia Youth Cup

Tournament details
- Country: Malaysia
- Dates: 23 February – 14 June
- Teams: 19

Final positions
- Champions: None; cancelled and declared null and void

Tournament statistics
- Matches played: 45
- Goals scored: 116 (2.58 per match)
- All statistics correct as of 15 March 2020.

The 2020 Piala Belia (transl. Youth Cup) was the 10th season of the Piala Belia since its establishment in 2008. The league is currently the youth level (U19) football league in Malaysia. Terengganu are the defending champions. 19 teams competed in this season. All teams were drawn into two different groups, and plays in a maximum of 18 home-and-away matches. Top eight teams after the completion of group stage matches progressed to knockout stage.

== Teams ==
The following teams are participating in the 2020 Piala Belia.

Group A (Northern Zone)

- AMD U16
- Felda United U19
- Kedah U19
- Kelantan U19
- Pahang U19
- PDRM U19
- Perak IV
- Pulau Pinang U19
- Terengganu IV

Group B (Southern Zone)

- Johor Darul Ta'zim IV
- Kuala Lumpur U19
- Melaka U19
- Negeri Sembilan U19
- PJ City U19
- Sabah U19
- Sarawak United U19
- Selangor U19
- UiTM U19
- UKM U19

== League table ==
=== Group A ===
Pos	Team	Pld	W	D	L	GF	GA	GD	Pts	Qualification
1	AMD U16	5	4	1	0	12	3	+9	13	Knockout stage
2	Perak IV	4	3	0	1	7	1	+6	9	Knockout stage
3	Kelantan U19	5	3	0	2	4	3	+1	9	Knockout stage
4	Felda United U19	5	2	2	1	5	6	−1	8	Knockout stage
5	Terengganu IV	4	2	1	1	4	3	+1	7	Knockout stage
6	Kedah U19	5	1	1	3	6	6	0	4	Knockout stage
7	Pulau Pinang U19	4	1	0	3	1	4	−3	3	Knockout stage
8	PDRM U19	4	1	0	3	2	11	−9	3	Knockout stage
9	Pahang U19	4	0	1	3	2	6	−4	1	

Updated to match(es) played on 15 March 2020. Source: FAM, Liga Malaysia
Rules for classification: 1) Points; 2) Goal difference; 3) Number of goals scored.

=== Group B ===
Pos	Team	Pld	W	D	L	GF	GA	GD	Pts	Qualification
1	Selangor U19	5	4	1	0	17	4	+13	13	Knockout stage
2	UiTM U19	5	4	0	1	9	5	+4	12	Knockout stage
3	Sabah U19	5	3	1	1	10	7	+3	10	Knockout stage
4	Negeri Sembilan U19	5	2	2	1	11	6	+5	8	Knockout stage
5	Johor Darul Ta'zim IV	5	2	2	1	3	5	−2	8	Knockout stage
6	Kuala Lumpur U19	5	2	0	3	8	7	+1	6	Knockout stage
7	Melaka U19	5	2	0	3	5	8	−3	6	Knockout stage
8	PJ City U19	5	1	2	2	9	9	0	5	Knockout stage
9	Sarawak United U19	5	0	2	3	1	6	−5	2	
10	UKM U19	5	0	0	5	0	16	−16	0	

Updated to match(es) played on 15 March 2020. Source: FAM, Liga Malaysia
Rules for classification: 1) Points; 2) Goal difference; 3) Number of goals scored.

== Result table ==
=== Group A ===
Home \ Away	AMD	FEL	KED	KEL	PAH	PDRM	PRK	PEN	TER
AMD U16	—					5–0			2–1
Felda United U19	2–2	—			1–0			1–0	
Kedah U19		1–1	—				0–2		
Kelantan U19	0–1		1–0	—		1–0			
Pahang U19				1–2	—				1–1
PDRM U19			1–5			—		1–0	
Perak IV		3–0			2–0		—		
Pulau Pinang U19	0–2			1–0				—	
Terengganu IV			1–0				1–0		—

Updated to match(es) played on 15 March 2020. Source: FAM
Legend: Blue = home team win; Yellow = draw; Red = away team win.

=== Group B ===
Home \ Away	JDT	KLU	MEL	NSE	PJC	SAB	SWU	SEL	UITM	UKM
Johor Darul Ta'zim IV	—							0–4	1–0	
Kuala Lumpur U19		—					3–0			4–0
Melaka U19		2–1	—			1–3			1–2	
Negeri Sembilan U19			0–1	—				2–2		
PJ City U19		3–0		2–2	—		0–0			
Sabah U19	1–1				3–1	—				
Sarawak United U19	0–0			1–2			—		0–1	
Selangor U19			2–0			4–2		—		5–0
UiTM U19		2–0			4–3				—	
UKM U19	0–1			0–5		0–1				—

Updated to match(es) played on 15 March 2020. Source: FAM
Legend: Blue = home team win; Yellow = draw; Red = away team win.

== See also ==
- 2020 Piala Presiden
