= 2018 Piala Presiden (Malaysia) =

Football league in Malaysia

Final positions
- Champions: Terengganu FC III (3rd title)
- Runners-up: Kedah U21

Tournament statistics
- Matches played: 233
- Goals scored: 520 (2.23 per match)
- All statistics correct as of 29 August 2018.

The 2018 Piala Presiden (transl. President Cup) is the 34th season of the Piala Presiden, the youth level (Under-21) football league of Malaysia. The competition organized by the Football Association of Malaysia (FAM).

== Rule changes ==
The Piala Presiden is the amateur football competition in Malaysia for under-21 players. Since its inception in 1985, Piala Presiden has been the major tournament for under-21 and under-23 players. In 2009, the format of the competition was changed with only under-20 players eligible to be fielded for the tournament. In 2015 the format of the competition reverted to the original format with under-21 players.

== Teams ==
The following teams will be participate in the 2018 Piala Presiden.

Team	Based
Kuala Lumpur	Bangi
Penang	Batu Kawan
Perlis	Kangar
(Malacca) Melaka	Paya Rumput
Pahang	Kuantan
Kedah	Alor Setar
(Selangor) PKNS	Kelana Jaya
(Kuala Lumpur) Felda United	Nilai
Terengganu FC III	Kuala Terengganu
Johor Darul Ta'zim III	Pasir Gudang
Negeri Sembilan	Paroi
Selangor	Salak Tinggi
Sarawak	Kuching
Kelantan	Kota Bharu
Perak	Ipoh
Sabah	Penampang
(Selangor) UiTM	Shah Alam
(Perak) PKNP	Chemor
Selangor United	Shah Alam
PDRM	Kuala Lumpur
(Kuala Lumpur) MISC-MIFA	Kuala Lumpur
ATM	Kuala Lumpur

== League table ==
=== Group A ===
Pos	Team	Pld	W	D	L	GF	GA	GD	Pts	Qualification
1	Kedah U21	20	13	6	1	44	15	+29	45	Knockout Stage
2	Johor Darul Ta'zim III	20	12	5	3	39	16	+23	41	Knockout Stage
3	Sabah U21	20	13	2	5	26	11	+15	41	Knockout Stage
4	Kelantan U21	20	11	5	4	42	26	+16	38	Knockout Stage
5	Selangor U21	20	8	7	5	25	17	+8	31	
6	Pahang U21	20	9	3	8	34	31	+3	30	
7	Melaka U21	20	8	5	7	24	24	0	29	
8	Perlis U21	20	6	4	10	24	33	−9	22	
9	Selangor United U21	20	3	4	13	16	31	−15	13	
10	MISC-MIFA U21	20	3	2	15	17	40	−23	11	
11	ATM U21	20	2	1	17	5	52	−47	7	

Source: FAM, Liga Malaysia
Rules for classification: 1) Points; 2) Goal difference; 3) Number of goals scored.

=== Group B ===
Pos	Team	Pld	W	D	L	GF	GA	GD	Pts	Qualification
1	Terengganu III	20	11	7	2	26	11	+15	40	Knockout Stage
2	Felda United U21	20	10	9	1	21	8	+13	39	Knockout Stage
3	UiTM U21	20	11	4	5	26	17	+9	37	Knockout Stage
4	PKNP U21	20	10	5	5	21	14	+7	35	Knockout Stage
5	Pulau Pinang U21	20	9	6	5	19	14	+5	33	
6	Perak U21	20	6	6	8	18	17	+1	24	
7	Negeri Sembilan U21	20	5	8	7	11	16	−5	23	
8	PKNS U21	20	4	8	8	21	25	−4	20	
9	Sarawak U21	20	5	5	10	13	21	−8	20	
10	Kuala Lumpur U21	20	3	8	9	9	19	−10	17	
11	PDRM U21	20	1	4	15	9	32	−23	7	

Source: FAM, Liga Malaysia
Rules for classification: 1) Points; 2) Goal difference; 3) Number of goals scored.

== Result table ==
=== Group A ===
Home \ Away	ATM	JDT	KED	KEL	MEL	MIF	PAH	PER	SAB	SEL	SUTD
ATM U21	—	0–1	0–1	1–5	0–3	0–1	0–4	1–4	0–4	0–3	0–0
Johor DT III	7–0	—	1–1	3–1	0–0	3–1	0–2	5–1	0–0	1–1	3–1
Kedah U21	4–0	2–0	—	1–1	4–1	4–0	3–1	1–1	0–1	0–0	4–1
Kelantan U21	6–0	0–1	1–1	—	5–1	3–3	1–0	2–1	1–0	1–1	2–1
Melaka U21	2–0	2–2	1–4	2–1	—	1–0	2–0	1–1	0–1	0–0	4–1
MISC-MIFA U21	1–0	1–4	0–2	2–3	0–1	—	1–3	4–1	0–2	0–1	1–4
Pahang U21	0–2	0–2	3–3	2–2	1–0	3–2	—	3–2	1–2	1–2	1–0
Perlis U21	2–0	0–1	2–4	0–1	2–1	1–0	2–4	—	1–0	0–2	1–1
Sabah U21	1–0	2–0	0–1	4–1	1–0	1–0	2–3	0–0	—	0–2	1–0
Selangor U21	3–0	0–2	0–1	1–3	1–1	3–0	2–2	0–1	0–2	—	1–1
Selangor United U21	0–1	1–3	0–2	1–2	0–1	0–0	1–0	2–1	1–2	0–1	—

Source: FAM
Legend: Blue = home team win; Yellow = draw; Red = away team win.

=== Group B ===
Home \ Away	FEL	KLU	NSE	PDRM	PRK	PKNP	PKNS	PEN	SAR	TER	UiTM
Felda United U21	—	1–0	2–0	2–0	0–0	0–1	1–1	0–0	1–1	1–0	0–0
Kuala Lumpur U21	1–1	—	0–0	0–0	0–1	1–1	1–3	0–1	2–0	0–1	2–1
Negeri Sembilan U21	0–1	0–0	—	1–0	0–0	0–1	1–0	0–0	1–0	0–2	3–2
PDRM U21	0–1	0–0	1–1	—	0–2	0–1	0–3	0–1	0–2	0–2	0–1
Perak U21	0–1	3–0	1–1	2–2	—	0–0	3–1	1–2	1–0	1–2	1–1
PKNP U21	1–2	2–0	1–0	2–0	2–0	—	2–2	1–1	0–0	0–2	2–1
PKNS U21	1–1	0–1	0–0	4–1	0–2	0–2	—	1–2	1–1	1–1	1–2
Pulau Pinang U21	0–0	0–0	2–0	2–0	1–0	1–2	0–1	—	1–0	1–1	0–1
Sarawak U21	0–3	1–0	1–2	1–3	1–0	2–0	0–0	1–0	—	2–2	0–1
Terengganu III	2–3	1–1	0–0	1–0	2–0	1–0	0–0	3–1	2–0	—	1–0
UiTM U21	0–0	2–0	2–1	3–2	1–0	1–0	4–1	2–3	1–0	0–0	—

Source: FAM
Legend: Blue = home team win; Yellow = draw; Red = away team win.

== Knock-out stage ==
=== Bracket ===
Quarter-finals
1	Sabah U21	1	1	2
8	Felda United U21	2	1	3
4	PKNP U21	1	1	2
5	Kedah U21 (a)	2	0	2
2	UiTM U21	0	1	1
7	Johor Darul Ta'zim III	1	3	4
3	Kelantan U21	3	0	3
6	Terengganu III (a)	3	0	3

Semi-Finals
Felda United U21	0	2	2
Kedah U21	3	1	4
Johor Darul Ta'zim III	0	0	0
Terengganu III	0	1	1

Final
Kedah U21	1
Terengganu III	2

=== Quarterfinals ===
The first legs were played on 6 August, and the second legs were played on 10 August 2018.

}

Team 1	Agg.	Team 2	1st leg	2nd leg
Sabah U21	2–3	Felda United U21	1–2	1–1
PKNP U21	2–2 (a)	Kedah U21	1–2	1–0
UiTM U21	1–4	Johor Darul Ta'zim III	0–1	1–3
Kelantan U21	3–3 (a)	Terengganu III	3–3	0–0

6 August 2018
16:15 UTC+8

Sabah U21	1–2	Felda United U21

Likas Stadium
10 August 2018
16:15 UTC+8

Felda United U21	1–1	Sabah U21

UPM Stadium

Felda United U21 won 3–2 on aggregate.

6 August 2018
16:45 UTC+8

PKNP U21	1–2	Kedah U21

Padang PCRC
10 August 2018
16:15 UTC+8

Kedah	0–1	PKNP U21

Darul Aman Stadium

2–2 on aggregate. Kedah U21 won on away goals.

6 August 2018
16:45 UTC+8

UiTM U21	0–1	Johor Darul Ta'zim III

UiTM Stadium
10 August 2018
16:45 UTC+8

Johor Darul Ta'zim III	3–1	UiTM U21

Pasir Gudang Corporation Stadium

Johor Darul Ta'zim III won 4–1 on aggregate.

6 August 2018
16:45 UTC+8

Kelantan U21	3–3	Terengganu III

Sultan Muhammad IV Stadium
10 August 2018
16:45 UTC+8

Terengganu III	0–0	Kelantan U21

Sultan Mizan Zainal Abidin Stadium

3–3 on aggregate. Terengganu III won on away goals.

=== Semi-finals ===
The first legs will be played on 16 August, and the second legs will be played on 20 August 2018.

Team 1	Agg.	Team 2	1st leg	2nd leg
Felda United U21	2–4	Kedah U21	0–3	2–1
Johor Darul Ta'zim III	0–1	Terengganu III	0–0	0–1

16 August 2018
16:45 UTC+8

Felda United U21	0–3	Kedah U21

UPM Stadium
20 August 2018
20:45 UTC+8

Kedah U21	1–2	Felda United U21

Darul Aman Stadium

Kedah U19 won 4–2 on aggregate.

16 August 2018
16:45 UTC+8

Johor Darul Ta'zim III	0–0	Terengganu III

Pasir Gudang Corporation Stadium
20 August 2018
20:45 UTC+8

Terengganu III	1–0	Johor Darul Ta'zim III

Sultan Mizan Zainal Abidin Stadium

Terengganu III won 1–0 on aggregate.

=== Final ===
29 August 2018
20:45 UTC+8

Kedah U21	1–2 (a.e.t.)	Terengganu III
Aminuddin Abu Bakar 2'		Raimi Syahir 13'; Samsul Ikram 102'

KLFA Stadium

== Champions ==
Champions

== See also ==
- 2018 Malaysia Super League
- 2018 Malaysia Premier League
- 2018 Malaysia FAM Cup
- 2018 Malaysia FA Cup
- 2018 Malaysia Youth League
