= 2026–27 Piala Belia =

Football league in Malaysia

Malaysia Youth Cup

Tournament details
- Country: Malaysia
- Dates: 2 May – 25 October 2026
- Teams: 12

Final positions
- Champions: Johor Darul Ta'zim IV
- Runners-up: AMD A

Tournament statistics
- Matches played: 132
- Goals scored: 10 (0.08 per match)
- All statistics correct as of 25 Oct 2026.

The 2026–27 Piala Belia (Youth Cup) is the 14th season of the Piala Belia since its establishment in 2008. It is the youth level (U-18) football league in Malaysia. Johor Darul Ta'zim IV are the defending champions. 12 teams compete in this season with 24 home-and-away matches.

== Rules ==
=== Age limit ===
2026–27 Piala Belia is an amateur football competition in Malaysia for under-18 players. Since its inception in 2008, the Piala Belia has been a major tournament for under-19 players. In 2024, the format of the competition was changed with only under-18 players eligible to fill in for the tournament that.

=== Format ===
The tournament is played as follows:

- League level: The tournament follows a double round-robin league format, where each of the 12 participating teams plays 24 matches (home and away). The winner of the final (over two legs) — via aggregate score, or penalties if necessary — is crowned the Piala Presiden Champion for the season.

== Teams ==
The following teams were participating in the 2026–27 Piala Belia.

Team	Location	Stadium
AMD A	Gambang, Pahang	Padang 10 AMD Gambang
AMD B	Gambang, Pahang	Padang 10 AMD Gambang
Johor Darul Ta'zim IV	Kulai	Kulai Mini Stadium
Johor Darul Ta'zim V	Johor Bahru	Taman Ungku Tun Aminah Mini Stadium
Kelantan WTS U18	Kota Bharu	Sultan Muhammad IV Stadium
Kuala Lumpur FA U18	Cheras, Kuala Lumpur	Kuala Lumpur Stadium
Kuching City FC U18	Kota Samarahan	Kota Samarahan Sports Complex
PDRM FC U18	Kuala Lumpur	PULAPOL Training Ground
Penang FC III	Batu Kawan	Penang State Stadium
Sabah FC III	Penampang	Penampang Stadium
Selangor FC U18	Bukit Jelutong	Sime Darby Training Ground
Terengganu FC U18	Kuala Terengganu	Sultan Ismail Nasiruddin Shah Stadium

== Personnel, kit and sponsoring ==
Team	Head coach	Captain	Kit manufacturer	Sponsor
AMD A	(Malaysia) Kuizwan Johari	(Malaysia) Iman Irfan	Let's Play	N/A
AMD B	(Malaysia) S. Veloo	(Malaysia) Amir Airill Kencana Zaini	Let's Play	N/A
Johor Darul Ta'zim IV	(Malaysia) Shariman Che Omar	(Malaysia) Arif Aiman Za'aba	Nike	JDT Fan Token
Johor Darul Ta'zim V	(Spain) Pau Valldecabres Gimeno	(Malaysia) Arayyan Hakeem Norizam	Nike	JDT Fan Token
Kelantan WTS U18	(Malaysia) Kamaruddin Muhammad	(Malaysia) Muhamad Taif Mohd Shabri	WTS	N/A
Kuala Lumpur FA U18	(Malaysia) Mohd Faizal Esahar	(Malaysia) Ammar Nazrin Ahmad Najib	StarSports	N/A
Kuching City FC U18	(Malaysia) Joseph Kalang Tie	(Malaysia) Yodhison Noel	StarSports	City of Unity
PDRM FC U18	(Malaysia) Basirul Abu Bakar	(Malaysia) Ananda a/l Cha Rin	Lotto	redONE mobile
Penang FC III	(Malaysia) Noraffendi Taib	(Malaysia) Naufal Solihin Nazri	Kaki Jersi	Penang2030
Sabah FC III	(Malaysia) Jelius Ating	(Malaysia) Ronan Hansanon Richard	Carino	Ararat
Selangor FC U18	(Malaysia) Mohd Khushairi Abd Wahab	(Malaysia) Muhammad Muayyad Mohd Daud	Joma	PKNS / MBI
Terengganu FC U18	(Malaysia) Yahaya Mohd Noor	(Malaysia) Ariff Safwan Suhaimi	ALX	TFCPLAY

== League table ==
Pos	Team	Pld	W	D	L	GF	GA	GD	Pts	Qualification or relegation
1	Johor Darul Ta'zim IV (C)	22	20	1	1	80	6	+74	61	League Champion
2	AMD A	22	14	5	3	37	19	+18	47	
3	Selangor FC U18	22	12	7	3	32	15	+17	43	
4	Terengganu FC U18	22	12	5	5	32	16	+16	41	
5	Kuala Lumpur FA U18	22	12	2	8	43	25	+18	38	
6	Johor Darul Ta'zim V	22	10	5	7	29	29	0	35	
7	Penang FC III	22	6	8	8	22	31	−9	26	
8	AMD B	22	5	3	14	15	38	−23	18	
9	Sabah FC III	22	4	5	13	21	44	−23	17	
10	PDRM FC U18	22	4	4	14	17	37	−20	16	
11	Kelantan WTS U18	22	4	3	15	18	52	−34	15	
12	Kuching City Academy	22	2	6	14	18	52	−34	12	

Updated to match(es) played on 26 Oct 2026. Source: FAM-CMS
Rules for classification: 1) Points; 2) Goal difference; 3) Number of goals scored.
(C) League Champion

== Results table ==
Home \ Away	AMD	FUT	JIV	JDV	KLC	KUC	PDR	PEN	SAB	SEL	WTS	TER
AMD A		2–0	0–2	1–1	2–0	4–1	2–1	1–1	3–0	0–3	1–0	2–0
AMD B	0–2		0–4	0–2	0–2	2–2	0–1	0–1	1–0	1–1	2–1	0–2
Johor Darul Ta'zim IV	2–1	4–0		5–0	5–0	4–0	2–0	3–0	9–0	1–2	7–0	3–0
Johor Darul Ta'zim V	1–1	1–0	0–4		0–2	3–0	4–3	0–1	3–1	1–1	3–1	1–0
Kuala Lumpur FA U18	0–2	3–1	0–2	0–1		7–0	1–3	3–1	1–1	1–2	6–0	1–1
Kuching City FC U18	1–2	0–3	0–4	1–1	0–3		4–0	0–0	1–1	3–1	0–3	1–2
PDRM FC U18	1–1	1–0	0–7	0–1	0–1	1–1		0–0	1–2	0–1	1–1	0–2
Penang FC III	2–3	0–1	0–4	2–1	1–3	1–1	2–1		2–0	0–0	4–1	2–2
Sabah FC III	2–3	1–1	1–4	2–0	1–4	2–0	3–0	1–1		0–1	2–3	0–1
Selangor FC U18	0–1	3–1	0–0	2–2	1–0	3–1	1–0	4–0	2–0		2–0	1–1
Kelantan WTS U18	0–1	0–1	0–3	1–3	1–4	2–0	0–3	1–0	1–1	1–1		1–5
Terengganu FC U18	0–0	3–0	1–2	1–0	0–1	4–0	1–0	1–1	2–0	1–0	2–0	

Updated to match(es) played on 25 Oct 2026. Source: FAM-CMS
Legend: Blue = home team win; Yellow = draw; Red = away team win.
For upcoming matches, an "a" indicates there is an article about the rivalry between the two participants.

== Season statistics ==
=== Top goalscorers ===
As of 25 Oct 2026

Rank	Player	Club	Goals
1	(Malaysia) Fadhlul Hadi Zulkarnain	JDT IV	19
2	(Malaysia) Wan Muhd Ameer Izzuddin	Terengganu FC	14
3	(Malaysia) Nur Azam Muslim	AMD A	10
3	(Malaysia) Shahiman Mohd Nasir	Kuala Lumpur FA	10
5	(Malaysia) Zahirul Haq	JDT V	9
5	(Malaysia) Harith Haikal Qays	Kuala Lumpur FA	9

== See also ==
- 2026–27 Piala Presiden
