= 2024–25 Piala Presiden (Malaysia) =

Football league in Malaysia

Piala Presiden
Tournament details
- Country: Malaysia
- Dates: 21 April 2024 –13 November 2024
- Teams: 16

Final positions
- Champions: Johor Darul Ta'zim III
- Runners-up: Selangor

Tournament statistics
- Matches played: 94
- Goals scored: 227 (2.41 per match)
- Top goal scorer: Abdul Raziq Rahman (14 goals)
- All statistics correct as of 13 November 2024.

The 2024–25 Piala Presiden (transl. President Cup) is the 38th season of the Piala Presiden since its establishment in 1985. It is currently the youth level (U-20) football league in Malaysia. JDT III are the defending champions. 16 teams compete in this season. All teams were drawn into two different groups, and plays in a maximum of 14 home-and-away matches. Top four teams after the group stage matches progress to the knockout stage.

== Teams ==
The following teams were participating in the 2024–25 Piala Presiden.

Group A

- Johor Darul Ta'zim III
- Sabah FC U20
- Terengganu FC III
- Kuala Lumpur City U20
- Perak FC III
- AMD U17
- Melaka FA U20
- Kelantan FA U20

Group B

- Negeri Sembilan FC U20
- Kuching City FC U20
- Kedah Darul Aman FC C
- Penang FC III
- Kelantan Darul Naim FC U20
- Sri Pahang FC U20
- Selangor FC U20
- PDRM FC U20

== League table ==
=== Group A ===
Pos	Team	Pld	W	D	L	GF	GA	GD	Pts	Qualification
1	Johor Darul Ta'zim III	14	11	3	0	37	6	+31	36	Knockout Stage
2	AMD U17	14	8	3	3	22	16	+6	27	Knockout Stage
3	Terengganu FC III	14	6	6	2	23	13	+10	24	Knockout Stage
4	Perak FC III	14	7	2	5	17	12	+5	23	Knockout Stage
5	Kuala Lumpur City U20	14	5	2	7	17	28	−11	17	
6	Sabah FC U20	14	4	4	6	17	22	−5	16	
7	Melaka FA U20	14	2	2	10	8	23	−15	8	
8	Kelantan FA U20	14	1	2	11	10	31	−21	5	

Updated to match(es) played on 30 August 2024. Source: FAM,
Rules for classification: 1) Points; 2) Goal difference; 3) Number of goals scored.

=== Group B ===
Pos	Team	Pld	W	D	L	GF	GA	GD	Pts	Qualification
1	Selangor FC U20	14	12	2	0	32	6	+26	38	Knockout Stage
2	Negeri Sembilan FC U20	14	8	4	2	21	9	+12	28	Knockout Stage
3	Kelantan Darul Naim FC U20	14	7	3	4	24	17	+7	21 (Note: The match gave a free victory to Kuching City with a score of 3-0 because the Kelantan Darul Naim FC team could not attend the match. KELANTAN DARUL NAIM FC - Disciplinary imposed a fine minus 3 points for failing to attend the match.)	Knockout Stage
4	PDRM FC U20	14	5	3	6	14	16	−2	18	Knockout Stage
5	Penang FC U20	14	5	2	7	17	22	−5	17	
6	Sri Pahang FC U20	14	3	4	7	15	25	−10	13	
7	Kuching City FC U20	14	3	1	10	11	24	−13	10	
8	Kedah Darul Aman FC C	14	1	5	8	7	22	−15	8	

Updated to match(es) played on 9 August 2024. Source: FAM,
Rules for classification: 1) Points; 2) Goal difference; 3) Number of goals scored.

== Result table ==
=== Group A ===
Home \ Away	JDT	SAB	TER	KUL	PER	AMD	MEL	KEL
Johor Darul Ta'zim III		5–0	0–0	4–2	1–0	3–0	3–0	2–0
Sabah FC U20	0–4		3–1	0–2	1–2	0–0	0–1	5–1
Terengganu FC III	1–1	1–1		0–0	1–1	1–2	4–0	3–1
Kuala Lumpur City U20	0–6	1–3	2–4		1–1	0–3	0–2	1–0
Perak FC III	1–2	1–0	1–2	2–0		0–1	2–1	2–1
AMD U17	1–1	2–2	0–3	1–3	1–0		2–0	5–1
Melaka FA U20	0–3	0–1	0–0	1–2	0–1	2–3		0–0
Kelantan FA U20	1–2	1–1	1–2	1–3	0–3	0–1	2–1	

Updated to match(es) played on 8 August 2024. Source: FAM
Legend: Blue = home team win; Yellow = draw; Red = away team win.

=== Group B ===
Home \ Away	NSE	KUC	KDA	PEN	KDN	PAH	SEL	PDRM
Negeri Sembilan FC U20		1–0	2–0	1–0	1–1	1–2	0–1	2–0
Kuching City FC U20	0–1		0–2	0–2	3–0	1–2	0–1	1–5
Kedah Darul Aman FC U20	0–4	0–1		0–1	0–0	1–1	0–4	0–0
Penang FC U20	0–2	2–2	2–2		1–2	3–1	0–1	1–0
Kelantan Darul Naim FC U20	1–1	2–1	1–0	3–4		4–0	0–2	3–0
Sri Pahang FC U20	1–2	1–2	2–2	1–0	2–3		2–2	0–1
Selangor FC U20	2–2	3–0	2–0	4–1	2–1	3–0		3–0
PDRM FC U20	1–1	2–0	2–0	3–0	0–3	0–0	0–2	

Updated to match(es) played on 9 August 2024. Source: FAM
Legend: Blue = home team win; Yellow = draw; Red = away team win.

== Knock-out stage ==
=== Bracket ===
Quarter-finals
Perak FC III	1	0	1 (3)
Selangor FC U20 (p)	0	1	1 (5)
Kelantan Darul Naim FC U20	0	1	1
AMD U17	2	3	5
Terengganu FC III	1	1	2
Negeri Sembilan FC U20	0	0	0
PDRM FC U20	2	0	2
Johor Darul Ta'zim III	5	2	7

Semi-Finals
Selangor FC U20	1	4	5
AMD U17	1	0	1
Terengganu FC III	0	1	1
Johor Darul Ta'zim III	0	4	4

Final
Selangor FC U20	1	0	1
Johor Darul Ta'zim III	2	0	2

=== Quarter-finals ===
Team 1	Agg.	Team 2	1st leg	2nd leg
Perak FC III	1–1	Selangor FC U20	1–0	0–1
Kelantan Darul Naim U20	1–5	AMD U17	0–2	1–3
Terengganu III	2–0	Negeri Sembilan U20	1–0	1–0
PDRM U20	2–7	Johor Darul Ta'zim III	2–5	0–2

10 October 2024
16:45 UTC+8

Perak FC III	1–0	Selangor FC U20

Padang PCRC, Ipoh
17 October 2024
16:15 UTC+8

Selangor U20	1–0	Perak III

UM Arena Stadium , Kuala Lumpur

"The winner on aggregate or penalty kicks or away goals rule advances to the semi-finals."

10 October 2024
16:45 UTC+8

Kelantan Darul Naim FC U20	0–2	AMD U17

Machang District Mini Stadium, Machang
17 October 2024
16:15 UTC+8

AMD U17	3–1	Kelantan Darul Naim U20

Padang AMD, Gambang

"The winner on aggregate or penalty kicks or away goals rule advances to the semi-finals."

10 October 2024
16:45 UTC+8

Terengganu FC III	1–0	Negeri Sembilan FC U20

Sultan Ismail Nasiruddin Shah Stadium , Kuala Terengganu
17 October 2024
16:15 UTC+8

Negeri Sembilan U20	0–1	Terengganu III

Tampin Mini Stadium, Tampin

"The winner on aggregate or penalty kicks or away goals rule advances to the semi-finals."

10 October 2024
16:45 UTC+8

PDRM	2–5	JDT III

Selayang Stadium , Selayang
17 October 2024
20:15 UTC+8

JDT III	2–0	PDRM

Pasir Gudang Corporation Stadium, Pasir Gudang

"The winner on aggregate or penalty kicks or away goals rule advances to the semi-finals."

=== Semi-finals ===
Team 1	Agg.	Team 2	1st leg	2nd leg
Selangor U20	5–1	AMD U17	1–1	4–0
Terengganu FC III	1–4	JDT III	0–0	1–4

23 October 2024
--:-- UTC+8

AMD U17	1–1	Selangor U20

Padang 10 AMD, Gambang
30 October 2024
16:15 UTC+8

Selangor U20	4–0	AMD U17

UM Arena Stadium, Kuala Lumpur

"The winner on aggregate or penalty kicks or away goals rule advances to the finals."

16 October 2024
--:-- UTC+8

Terengganu FC III	0–0	JDT III

Sultan Ismail Nasiruddin Shah Stadium, Terengganu
30 October 2024
20:15 UTC+8

JDT III	4–1	Terengganu FC III

Majlis Bandaraya Pasir Gudang Stadium, Johor Baharu

"The winner on aggregate or penalty kicks or away goals rule advances to the finals."

== Final ==
Team 1	Agg.	Team 2	1st leg	2nd leg
Selangor U20	1–2	JDT III	1–2	0–0

6 November 2024
20:15 UTC+8

Selangor U20	1–2	JDT III
Harry Danish Haizon 81'	Report	Danish Syamer Tajuddin 27'; Abdul Raziq Abd Rahman 45+1'

MBPJ Stadium, Petaling Jaya
Attendance: 321
Referee: Muhammad Faizal bin Muhammad Talib
13 November 2024
20:15 UTC+8

JDT III	0–0	Selangor U20
	Report

Pasir Gudang Corporation Stadium
Attendance: 620
Referee: Zam Azwan Khan bin Rashid

== Champions ==
2024–25 Piala Presiden (Malaysia) Champions
Johor Darul Ta'zim III
Fourth Title

== Season statistics ==
=== Top goalscorers ===
As of 5 July 2024

Rank	Player	Club	Goal
1	Abdul Raziq Rahman	Johor Darul Ta'zim III	14
2	Muhammad Naim Zainuddin	Johor Darul Ta'zim III	8
3	Muhammad Zaim Iqbal	Negeri Sembilan U20	5
3	Jenalter Justin	Sabah U20	5
5	Alif Farhan	Kelantan Darul Naim U20	3
5	Syahir Zulihsan	Selangor U20	3
5	Zamirul Hakim Khair	Selangor U20	3
5	Airiel Zafran Azrul	Sri Pahang U20	3
9	19 players	14 clubs	2
28	60 players	16 clubs	1

=== Own goals ===
Rank	Player	Team	Against	Date	Goal
1	Lim Cheng Xu	Kuala Lumpur City U20	Johor Darul Ta'zim III	21 April 2024	1
1	Muzaffar Hamzah	Penang FC III	PDRM FC U20	16 May 2024	1

== See also ==
- 2024–25 Piala Belia
