= Liga Puteri-FAM =

FAM-Girl's League Liga Puteri-FAM
- Organising body: Football Association of Malaysia (FAM)
- Founded: December 2023; 2 years ago
- Country: Malaysia
- Confederation: AFC
- Number of clubs: 8
- Level on pyramid: 1
- Current champions: SSS Leopard (3rd title) (2026)
- Most championships: SSS Leopard (3 titles)
- Current: 2026 Liga Puteri-FAM

The Liga Puteri-FAM (transl. FAM-Girls League) is a tournament for female players under the age of 16, one of the women's football leagues in Malaysia run by the Football Association of Malaysia. It was established in December 2023. Liga Puteri-FAM is a developmental league designed to nurture female footballers and create a competitive platform for under-16 players nationwide.

== History ==
The league was officially introduced in December 2023 as a pilot tournament, featuring 8 teams in its inaugural season. In 2024, the league expanded to 9 teams, with further plans by FAM to grow the number of participating teams and increase the prize money.

== Number of teams ==
Period	No. of teams
2023	8
2024	9
2025	16 (qualification) 8 (Elite Division) 8 (Division 1)
2026–present	8 (Elite Division) 12 (Division 1)

== Current teams ==
Below are the member teams of the Liga Puteri-FAM for the 2026 season.

=== Elite Division ===
- (Kuala Lumpur) Havana FC
- Perak FA
- Selangor
- (Selangor) Sime Darby
- (Pahang) SSMP
- (Sabah) SSMS Phoenix
- (Selangor) SSS Leopard FC
- (Selangor) Velocity Academy

=== Division 1 ===
- (Selangor) BTB Tiger FC
- (Selangor) Future FA
- (Selangor) Junior Bangi FC
- (Kuala Lumpur) KL Rangers
- (Negeri Sembilan) MBS Nilai City
- Negeri Sembilan
- Penang Indian FC
- (Selangor) Perlima United
- (Johor) Pineapple South Vanguard
- Putrajaya Tigress
- Selangor Soccer School
- (Perak) Starbright SC

== Champions, runners-up and third places ==
=== Elite Division ===
Year	Champions	Runners–up	Third place
2023	(Selangor) Kelana United	(Selangor) SSS Leopard	Sabah FA (Perak) FEMI9 FC
2024	(Selangor) SSS Leopard	(Selangor) Velocity Academy	(Malacca) Melaka FA
2025	(Selangor) SSS Leopard	(Sabah) SSMS Phoenix	Selangor
2026	(Selangor) SSS Leopard	(Sabah) SSMS Phoenix	(Kuala Lumpur) KL Havana FC

=== Division 1 ===
Year	Champions	Runners–up	Third place
2025	(Pahang) SSMP	Negeri Sembilan	Selangor Soccer School
2026	Penang Indian FC	(Selangor) Perlima United	(Kuala Lumpur) Future FA

== Titles by team (2023–present) ==
Team	Titles	Winning seasons
(Selangor) SSS Leopard	3	2024, 2025, 2026
(Selangor) Kelana United	1	2023

== Performance by team (2023–present) ==
Team	Winners	Runners-up
(Selangor) SSS Leopard	3 (2024, 2025, 2026)	1 (2023)
(Selangor) Kelana United	1 (2023)	
(Sabah) SSMS Phoenix		2 (2025, 2026)
(Selangor) Velocity Academy		1 (2024)

== Awards ==
=== Prize money ===
For the 2026 season, the distribution of the prize money is as follows.

==== Elite Division ====
- Winner: RM 15,000
- Runner-up: RM 10,000
- Third place: RM 5,000

==== Division 1 ====
- Winner: RM 5,000
- Runner-up: RM 3,000
- Third place: RM 1,000

=== Golden boot winners ===
==== Elite Division ====
Season	Player	Team	Goals
2023	(Malaysia) Nina Hasmaji	Sabah	11
2024	(Malaysia) Putri Mia Alysa	Velocity Academy	10
2025	(Malaysia) Aisyah Nur Iman	SSS Leopard FC	7
2026	(Malaysia) Nur Laila Syamila	SSS Leopard FC	9

==== Division 1 ====
Season	Player	Team	Goals
2025	(Malaysia) Siti Balqhis Binti Mukhtar	SSMP	11
2026	(Malaysia) Danushri A/P Anbarasan	Penang Indian FC	10

=== Best player ===
Season	Player	Team
2023	(Malaysia) Nur Shadrina Ahmad Johari	Kelana United
2024	(Malaysia) Putri Mia Alysa Zakiyamani	Velocity Academy
2025	(Malaysia) Izz Damia	SSS Leopard
2026	(Malaysia) Nur Alesyah Jainuddin	SSMS Phoenix

=== Best goalkeeper ===
Season	Player	Team
2023	(Malaysia) Putri Aina Husna	SSS Leopard
2024	(Malaysia) Putri Aina Husna	SSS Leopard
2025	(Malaysia) Farzana Izzati	Velocity Academy
2026	(Malaysia) Nur Irdina Adriana	SSS Leopard
