= 2025 Liga Puteri-FAM =

Football league in Malaysia

2025 Liga Puteri
Tournament details
- Country: Malaysia
- Dates: 17–24 May 2025 (qualification)
- Teams: 16

Final positions
- Champions: SSS Leopard FC
- Runners-up: SSMS Phoenix

The 2025 Liga Puteri-FAM (transl. FAM-Girls League) is the third edition of the Liga Puteri, women's football league in Malaysia for female players under the age of 16, run by the Football Association of Malaysia. SSS Leopard were the defending champions. 16 teams competed in qualifying round, divided into 4 groups.

== Format ==
The tournament is played as follows:

- Qualification Round: The Liga Puteri 2025 Qualification Round was held from 17–25 May 2025, with 16 teams divided into 4 groups.
- The group winners and the best two runners-up qualified for the Elite Division.
- Alongside them, the 2024 champions (SSS Leopard FC), runners-up (Velocity Academy), and invited side SSMS Phoenix were added to the Elite Division.
- The other teams were placed into Division 1, consisting of the remaining group runners-up, third-placed teams, and the best fourth-placed team.

== Teams ==
The following teams participated in qualification round for the 2025 Liga Puteri-FAM.

- (Selangor) Anak Sejati FC
- (Perak) FEMI9 FC
- (Kuala Lumpur) Future Football Academy
- (Kuala Lumpur) Havana FC
- (Selangor) Junior Bangi FC
- (Kuala Lumpur) KL Rangers
- (Selangor) Medanian Titanic FC
- Negeri Sembilan
- Putrajaya Tigress
- (Penang) Real CJ
- Selangor
- Selangor Soccer School
- (Selangor) Sime Darby
- (Pahang) SSMP
- (Perak) Starbrite FC
- (Kuala Lumpur) Wangsa Maju City

== Qualification ==
=== Standings ===
==== Group A ====
Pos	Team	Pld	W	D	L	GF	GA	GD	Pts	Qualification or relegation
1	Sime Darby	3	2	1	0	13	1	+12	7	Promoted to Elite Division
2	Starbrite FC	3	1	2	0	11	1	+10	5	Advance to Division 1
3	Medanian Titanic FC	3	1	1	1	4	2	+2	4	Advance to Division 1
4	Future Football Academy	3	0	0	3	0	24	−24	0	Eliminated

Updated to match(es) played on 19 June 2025. Source: FAM-CMS
Rules for classification: 1) Points; 2) Goal difference; 3) Number of goals scored.

==== Group B ====
Pos	Team	Pld	W	D	L	GF	GA	GD	Pts	Qualification or relegation
1	Real CJ	3	3	0	0	27	0	+27	9	Promoted to Elite Division
2	Negeri Sembilan	3	2	0	1	8	5	+3	6	Advance to Division 1
3	Anak Sejati FC	3	1	0	2	4	14	−10	3	Advance to Division 1
4	Putrajaya Tigress	3	0	0	3	1	21	−20	0	Eliminated

Updated to match(es) played on 19 June 2025. Source: FAM-CMS
Rules for classification: 1) Points; 2) Goal difference; 3) Number of goals scored.

==== Group C ====
Pos	Team	Pld	W	D	L	GF	GA	GD	Pts	Qualification or relegation
1	Havana FC	3	3	0	0	35	0	+35	9	Promoted to Elite Division
2	FEMI9 FC	3	2	0	1	20	7	+13	6	Promoted to Elite Division
3	KL Rangers	3	1	0	2	3	22	−19	3	Advance to Division 1
4	Wangsa Maju City	3	0	0	3	0	29	−29	0	Eliminated

Updated to match(es) played on 19 June 2025. Source: FAM-CMS
Rules for classification: 1) Points; 2) Goal difference; 3) Number of goals scored.

==== Group D ====
Pos	Team	Pld	W	D	L	GF	GA	GD	Pts	Qualification or relegation
1	Selangor	3	3	0	0	10	0	+10	9	Promoted to Elite Division
2	SSMP	3	2	0	1	14	2	+12	6	Advance to Division 1
3	Junior Bangi FC	3	1	0	2	2	13	−11	3	Advance to Division 1
4	Selangor Soccer School	3	0	0	3	1	12	−11	0	Advance to Division 1

Updated to match(es) played on 19 June 2025. Source: FAM-CMS
Rules for classification: 1) Points; 2) Goal difference; 3) Number of goals scored.

== Elite Division ==
=== Standings ===
Pos	Team	Pld	W	D	L	GF	GA	GD	Pts	Qualification or relegation
1	SSS Leopard FC (C)	7	5	2	0	30	2	+28	17	
2	SSMS Phoenix	7	5	1	1	19	6	+13	16	
3	Selangor	7	4	2	1	12	4	+8	14	
4	Velocity Academy	7	3	2	2	11	5	+6	11	
5	Real CJ	7	3	2	2	10	6	+4	11	Withdrew next season (Note: FEMI9 FC & Real CJ withdrew next season.)
6	FEMI9 FC	7	1	2	4	7	19	−12	5	Withdrew next season
7	Havana FC	7	1	1	5	5	24	−19	4	
8	Sime Darby	7	0	0	7	2	30	−28	0	

Updated to match(es) played on 23 August 2025. Source: FAM-CMS
Rules for classification: 1) Points; 2) Goal difference; 3) Number of goals scored.
(C) League Champion

== Division 1 ==
=== Group stage ===
==== Group A ====
Pos	Team	Pld	W	D	L	GF	GA	GD	Pts	Qualification or relegation
1	Selangor Soccer School	3	2	1	0	9	1	+8	7	Advance to Knock-out stage
2	Junior Bangi FC	3	1	1	1	3	6	−3	4	Advance to Knock-out stage
3	Starbite FC	3	0	2	1	1	3	−2	2	
4	Anak Sejati FC	3	0	2	1	1	4	−3	2	

Updated to match(es) played on 21 July 2025. Source: FAM-CMS
Rules for classification: 1) Points; 2) Goal difference; 3) Number of goals scored.

==== Group B ====
Pos	Team	Pld	W	D	L	GF	GA	GD	Pts	Qualification or relegation
1	Negeri Sembilan	3	3	0	0	9	1	+8	9	Advance to Knock-out stage
2	SSMP (C)	3	2	0	1	9	2	+7	6	Advance to Knock-out stage
3	Medanian Titanic FC	3	1	0	2	2	6	−4	3	
4	KL Rangers	3	0	0	3	1	12	−11	0	

Updated to match(es) played on 21 July 2025. Source: FAM-CMS
Rules for classification: 1) Points; 2) Goal difference; 3) Number of goals scored.
(C) League Champion

=== Knock-out stage ===
Semifinals
1A	Selangor Soccer School	0
2B	SSMP	5
1B	Negeri Sembilan	0 (2)
2A	Junior Bangi FC	0 (1)

Final
SSMP	8
Negeri Sembilan	0
Third place play-off
Selangor Soccer School	3
Junior Bangi FC	0

==== Semi-finals ====
27 July 2025	Selangor Soccer School	0–5	SSMP	Setia Alam
20:15 UTC+8		Report		Stadium: Padang A, JSA Setia Alam; Attendance: 50

27 July 2025	Negeri Sembilan	0–0 (2–1 p)	Junior Bangi FC	Setia Alam
20:15 UTC+8		Report		Stadium: Padang B, JSA Setia Alam; Attendance: 80

==== Third place play-off ====
3 August 2025	Selangor Soccer School	3–0	Junior Bangi FC	Setia Alam
16:30 UTC+8	Abigail Chandran 24', 29'; Nanthana Nagarajan 24', 29'	Report		Stadium: Padang B, JSA Setia Alam; Attendance: 55

==== Final ====
3 August 2025	SSMP	8–0	Negeri Sembilan	Setia Alam
20:30 UTC+8		Report		Stadium: Padang B, JSA Setia Alam

== Season statistics ==
Statistics exclude qualifying round.

=== Top goalscorers (Elite Division) ===
As of 23 Aug 2025

Rank	Player	Team	Goals
1	Aisyah Nur Iman	SSS Leopard FC	7
2	Nera Nadhirah	SSMS Phoenix	6
3	Qistina Uzma	Real CJ	5
3	Malikah Farzana	SSS Leopard FC	5
5	Batrisyia Faliha	Selangor FC	4
5	Haniz Zahra	SSS Leopard FC	4
5	Laila Syamila	SSS Leopard FC	4
5	Zafirah Zulaikha	SSS Leopard FC	4

== See also ==
- 2025–26 Piala Presiden
- 2025–26 Piala Belia
