= 2006–07 Malaysia Premier League =

Liga Premier
- Season: 2006–07
- Champions: PDRM; 1st title
- Promoted: PDRM; UPB-MyTeam

The 2006–07 Liga Premier (English: 2006–07 Premier League), also known as the TM Liga Premier for sponsorship reasons, was the fourth season of the Liga Premier, the second-tier professional football league in Malaysia.

The season was held from 22 December 2006 and concluded on 21 July 2007. A total of 11 clubs compete in a single group format for the promotion to expanded 2007–08 Liga Super season.

The Liga Premier champions for 2006–07 was PDRM. The club were promoted to 2007–08 Liga Super along with runners-up UPB-MyTeam.

== Team changes ==
=== To Premier League ===
Relegated from Super League

- No team.

Promoted from 2006 FAM League

- Pasir Gudang United
- ATM FA
- Kuala Muda Naza
- PLUS

=== From Premier League ===
Promoted to Super League

- Kedah
- Malacca
- Terengganu
- DPMM
- Sarawak
- Johor FC

Relegated to 2007 FAM League

- Suria Nibong Tebal
- TNB Kelantan

=== Name changes ===
- Johor FA has merged with Pasir Gudang United and renamed as Johor Pasir Gudang. Johor FA decided to compete under the sponsored name Johor PBT Pasir Gudang (or Johor Pasir Gudang). They were given the green light by Football Association of Malaysia on 9 January 2007 to compete under the new name. A reason for the name change is that the Pasir Gudang Local Authority (PBTPG), now known as Majlis Perbandaran Pasir Gudang (MPPG), is Johor FA's main sponsor during that season. The reason was controversial because the team had to merge with the now-defunct Pasir Gudang United F.C., which caused unrest amongst supporters.

== League table ==
Pos	Team	Pld	W	D	L	GF	GA	GD	Pts	Promotion
1	PDRM	20	14	2	4	40	25	+15	44	Champion and promoted to 2007–08 Liga Super
2	(Kuala Lumpur) UPB-MyTeam	20	12	5	3	36	22	+14	41	Promoted to 2007–08 Liga Super
3	(Selangor) PKNS	20	9	5	6	29	27	+2	32	
4	Johor Pasir Gudang	20	8	6	6	33	22	+11	30	
5	(Pahang) Shahzan Muda	20	7	7	6	28	24	+4	28	
6	Sabah	20	6	9	5	26	21	+5	27	
7	Kuala Lumpur	20	6	6	8	23	28	−5	24	
8	Kelantan	20	4	8	8	23	31	−8	20	
9	ATM	20	5	4	11	23	36	−13	19	
10	(Kedah) Kuala Muda Naza	20	4	6	10	18	26	−8	18	
11	(Federal Territories of Malaysia) PLUS	20	4	4	12	26	41	−15	16	

Note:

- A format changes was introduced as all clubs will compete in a single group compared to previous season.
- UPB changed its name to UPB-MyTeam to reflect its new ownership.
- No relegations for this seasons as the Liga Premier will be expanded to 13 teams for the 2007–08 season.
