= 2025–26 Piala Presiden =

Football league in Malaysia

Malaysia President Cup

Tournament details
- Country: Malaysia
- Dates: 19 April 2025 – 2026
- Teams: 11

Final positions
- Champions: Johor Darul Ta'zim III

Tournament statistics
- Matches played: 14
- Goals scored: 29 (2.07 per match)
- All statistics correct as of 2 Oct 2025.

The 2025–26 Piala Presiden (transl. President Cup) is the 39th season of the Piala Presiden since its establishment in 1985. It is the youth level (U-20) football league in Malaysia. JDT III are the defending champions. 11 teams compete in this season, playing 20 home-and-away matches.

== Rules ==
=== Age limit ===
2025–26 Piala Presiden (Malaysia) is an amateur football competition in Malaysia for under-21 players. Since its inception in 1986, the Piala Presiden has been a major tournament for under-21 and under-23 players. In 2009, the format of the competition was changed with only under-20 players eligible to fill in for the tournament that. Players must be under 20 years old, aligning with the Asian Football Confederation (AFC) youth tournament cycles.

=== Format ===
The tournament is played as follows:

- League level: The tournament follows a double round-robin league format, where each of the 11 participating teams plays 20 matches (home and away). The winner of the final (over two legs) — via aggregate score, or penalties if necessary — is crowned the Piala Presiden Champion for the season.

== Teams ==
The following teams are participating in the 2025–26 Piala Presiden.

Team	Location	Stadium
AMD U17	Gambang, Pahang	Padang 10 AMD Gambang
Johor Darul Ta'zim III	Pasir Gudang	Pasir Gudang Corporation Stadium
Kuala Lumpur City U20	Kuala Lumpur	UM Arena Stadium
Kuching City FC U20	Miri	Miri Stadium
Melaka FA U20	Melaka City	Hang Tuah Stadium
Negeri Sembilan FC U20	Tampin	Tampin Mini Stadium
PDRM FC U20	Cyberjaya	MMU Mini Stadium
Penang FC II	Bukit Mertajam	Jalan Betek (KSJB) Sports Complex
Sabah FC II	Penampang	Penampang Sports Complex Stadium
Selangor FC U20	Kuala Lumpur	UM Arena Stadium
Terengganu FC U20	Kuala Nerus	UniSZA Mini Stadium

== Personnel, kit and sponsoring ==
Team	Head coach	Captain	Kit manufacturer	Sponsor
AMD U17	(Malaysia) Amarul Nazar Mohamed	(Malaysia) Aisy Aqasha	N/A	N/A
Johor Darul Ta'zim III	(Spain) Pedro Collado Celda	(Malaysia) Adib Ibrahim	Nike	JDT Fan Token
Kuala Lumpur City U20	(Malaysia) Iqbal Hanafi Masduki	(Malaysia) Izzat Irfan Ahmad Zahairi	StarSports	N/A
Kuching City FC U20	(Malaysia) Hakimi Man	(Malaysia) Ariff Iskandar Siri	StarSports	City of Unity
Melaka FA U20	(Malaysia) Sapian Abdul Wahid	(Malaysia) Mohamad Farish Ainun Aswadi	ZeroFour	N/A
Negeri Sembilan FC U20	(Malaysia) Norhafiz Zamani	(Malaysia) Muhammad Zuryhakim Mohd Zafran	Warrix	N/A
PDRM FC U20	(Malaysia) Alif Haikal Ganaeson	(Malaysia) Syazrul Haziq	Lotto	redONE mobile
Penang FC II	(Malaysia) Farkhis Fisol	(Malaysia) Muzhaffar Hamzah	Kaki Jersi	Penang2030
Sabah FC II	(Malaysia) Rafie Robert	(Malaysia) Angelo Christino Ansaman	DFR	N/A
Selangor FC U20	(Malaysia) Muhammad Firdaus Aziz	(Malaysia) Ahmad Ariz Zuhayr	Joma	PKNS / MBI
Terengganu FC U20	(Malaysia) Subri Sulong	(Malaysia) Farish Daniel Mohd Rahima	ALX	TFCPLAY

== Standings ==
Pos	Team	Pld	W	D	L	GF	GA	GD	Pts
1	Johor Darul Ta'zim III (C)	20	17	1	2	53	11	+42	52
2	Selangor FC U20	20	14	5	1	38	9	+29	47
3	Terengganu FC U20	20	13	5	2	41	9	+32	44
4	AMD U17	20	11	3	6	41	31	+10	36
5	Negeri Sembilan FC U20	20	9	7	4	31	23	+8	34
6	Kuala Lumpur City U20	20	8	2	10	31	30	+1	26
7	PDRM FC U20	20	5	7	8	20	32	−12	22
8	Sabah FC II	20	4	5	11	15	31	−16	17
9	Kuching City FC U20	20	2	5	13	17	33	−16	11
10	Melaka FA U20	20	2	4	14	8	50	−42	10
11	Penang FC II	20	1	4	15	12	48	−36	7

Updated to match(es) played on 18 October 2025. Source: FAM-CMS
Rules for classification: 1) Points; 2) Goal difference; 3) Number of goals scored.
(C) League Champion

== Results table ==
Home \ Away	AMD	JDT	KLC	KUC	MEL	NEG	PDR	PEN	SAB	SEL	TER
AMD U17		1–2	4–3	5–2	3–0	0–1	5–1	4–2	1–0	1–4	1–3
Johor Darul Ta'zim III	3–0		1–1	3–1	7–1	4–0	4–2	7–0	5–0	1–0	2–0
Kuala Lumpur City U20	0–1	2–1		0–2	4–1	2–2	6–0	3–1	2–1	0–2	0–3
Kuching City FC U20	1–3	0–1	0–1		0–0	2–3	1–2	2–0	0–0	0–1	0–2
Melaka FA U20	1–2	0–2	0–2	3–0		0–4	0–4	1–0	0–0	0–2	0–0
Negeri Sembilan FC U20	2–2	1–3	1–0	2–1	4–1		1–1	4–1	2–1	1–2	0–1
PDRM FC U20	0–2	0–2	2–1	1–1	0–0	0–0		1–0	3–0	1–1	1–2
Penang FC II	2–4	0–1	0–2	2–2	2–0	0–0	0–0		0–1	0–4	0–4
Sabah FC II	2–2	0–2	2–1	2–1	3–0	1–2	0–0	1–1		0–2	0–3
Selangor FC U20	2–0	2–1	2–1	1–1	5–0	0–0	1–0	5–1	1–0		1–1
Terengganu FC U20	0–0	0–1	4–0	1–0	6–0	1–1	5–1	2–0	3–1	0–0	

Updated to match(es) played on 18 October 2025. Source: FAM-CMS
Legend: Blue = home team win; Yellow = draw; Red = away team win.
For upcoming matches, an "a" indicates there is an article about the rivalry between the two participants.

== Season statistics ==
=== Top goalscorers ===
As of 18 Oct 2025

Rank	Player	Club	Goals
1	Izzuddin Afif	AMD U17	17
2	Izzat Syahir	Selangor U20	16
3	Naim Zainudin	Johor Darul Ta'zim III	15
4	Daniesh Amirruddin	Johor Darul Ta'zim III	12
5	Muhammad Haziq Zamri	Terengganu U20	11

=== Hat-trick ===
Player	Team	Against	Result	Date
Nabil Zakwan Mohd Zaki	Kuala Lumpur City U20	PDRM U20	6–0 (H)	8 May 2025
Muhammad Naim Zainudin^{4}	Johor Darul Ta'zim III	Penang II	7–0 (H)	14 May 2025
Izzuddin Afif	AMD U17	Kuching City U20	1–3 (A)	15 May 2025

Note

^{4} Player with 4 goal
(H) Home dan (A) Away.

=== Own goals ===
Rank	Player	Team	Against	Date	Goal
1	Adib Irfan Zulkifli	Melaka FA U20	Sabah II	1 May 2025	1
1	Putra Ryan Edzri	Melaka FA U20	Negeri Sembilan U20	22 May 2025	1

== See also ==
- 2025–26 Piala Belia
