= Mohd Arsyah Ayob =

Malaysian footballer

Arsyah
Personal information
- Full name: Mohammad Arsyah Bin Mohammad Ayob
- Date of birth: 26 August 1980 (age 46)
- Place of birth: Sungai Ramal, Selangor, Malaysia
- Height: 1.67 m (5 ft 5 1/2 in)
- Position: Midfielder

Team information
- Current team: KL Rangers women (head coach)

Youth career
- 2000–2001: Selangor

Senior career*
Years	Team	Apps	(Gls)
2002–2004	Malacca		(3)
2004	→ Sabah (loan)		(0)
2005	Sabah		(0)
2005–2006	Perlis		(0)
2006–2007	DPMM		(0)
2007–2008	ATM		
2008	→ Sarawak (loan)		
2009	Perak		
2010	Felda United		
2011	Penang		
2013–2015	SPA		

International career
2005	Malaysia	2	(1)

Managerial career
- 2014–2017: Hulu Langat FC
- 2018–2019: MOA FC
- 2020: PLD Hulu Langat (NFDP)
- 2021–2022: PLD Putrajaya (NFDP)
- 2022: PDRM FC U21 (Assistant coach)
- 2023: PLD Putrajaya (NFDP)
- 2023: PDRM FC U20 (Assistant coach)
- 2024: PDRM FC U20
- 2025–: KL Rangers women
- * Club domestic league appearances and goals

Mohammad Arsyah bin Mohammad Ayob (born 26 August 1980) is a Malaysian former footballer who played as a midfielder. He is currently coaching the Malaysia National Women's League club KL Rangers women.

== Club career ==
Arsyah started his career with Selangor, before joining Malacca in 2002. He went on loan to Sabah in 2004 and made his move permanent the following season.

Arsyah transferred to league champions Perlis in 2006 after the relegation of his club to the Malaysia Premier League. His team were losing finalists of the year's Malaysia FA Cup but became triumphant in the following Malaysia Cup after a 2–1 victory over Negeri Sembilan.

After the season ended, Arsyah went on trial to newly-promoted Bruneian club DPMM FC and was signed by the club for the 2006–07 campaign. The team defied expectations when they finished third in the league in their debut season, thanks to the goals of league joint top-scorer Shah Razen Said.

Arsyah subsequently moved to ATM FC of the Malaysia Premier League for the 2007–08 season, but went on loan to Sarawak for their 2008 Malaysia Cup campaign. He returned to the MSL with Perak under M. Karathu in 2009. The following year, Arsyah won the Malaysia Premier League with FELDA United in 2010. He began the 2011 season playing for Penang but after the team only mustered one point in 18 matches, he was shown out the door in May.

At the start of the 2013 season, Arsyah joined SPA Putrajaya, newly-promoted from last year's FAM League. He stayed with the Wild Cats until the end of the 2015, in which the team folded after finishing in last place with financial instability.

== International career ==
Under Hungarian coach Bertalan Bicskei, Arsyah was called up by his country for the June 2005 Causeway Challenge Cup matches with Singapore. He scored Malaysia's solitary goal in Malaysia's home leg on 8 June at City Stadium in Penang where the Malayan Tigers lost 1–4 on aggregate.

== Managerial record ==
As of 5 December 2016

Competition
Competition	Game	Win	Draw	Lose	Win%
Liga Bolasepak Rakyat 2016 SUKSES (Kejohanan Sukan Selangor) 2014, 2015	24	16	4	4	66.67

== Honours ==
Perlis

- Malaysia FA Cup: 2006 (runners-up)
- Malaysia Cup: 2006

Felda United

- Malaysia Premier League: 2010
