= 2006 Malaysia FAM League =

Malaysia FAM League
- Season: 2006
- Champions: (Johor) Pasir Gudang United F.C.
- Promoted: (Johor) Pasir Gudang United F.C. ATM FA (Kedah) Kuala Muda Naza F.C. (Kuala Lumpur) PLUS FC

2006 FAM League is the 55th edition season of current third-tier league competition in Malaysia.

The league winner for 2006 season was Pasir Gudang United F.C.

== Teams ==
The following teams participated in the Malaysia FAM Cup 2006. In order by the number given by FAM:

- ATM FA
- (Kuala Lumpur) DBKL FC
- (Johor) Pasir Gudang United F.C.
- (Johor) SAJ FC
- (Kedah) Kuala Muda Naza F.C.
- (Kuala Lumpur) KL Kesas F.C.
- Kuala Lumpur Maju United
- (Kuala Lumpur) PLUS FC
- (Penang) PP Kampung Seronok F.C.
- (Selangor) MPSJ FC
- (Selangor) Proton FC
- (Selangor) SUKSES FC

== Season changes ==
The following teams have changed division since the 2005 season.

=== To Malaysia FAM League ===
New Team

- (Penang) PP Kampung Seronok FC

=== From Malaysia FAM League ===
Promoted to 2005–06 Malaysia Premier League

- Kelantan F.A.
- (Pahang) Shahzan Muda F.C.

Teams withdrawn

- Selangor MP Selayang F.C.

=== Team summaries ===
==== Stadia ====
Team	Location	Stadium	Stadium capacity^{1}
ATM			
DBKL	Kuala Lumpur		
Johor Pasir Gudang United	Johor	Pasir Gudan Stadium	3,000
Johor SAJ FC	Johor	Tun Aminah Mini Stadium, Skudai, Johor Bahru, Johor	500
Kedah Kuala Muda NAZA	Kedah		
Kuala Lumpur KESAS	Kuala Lumpur		
Kuala Lumpur Maju United FC	Kuala Lumpur		
Kuala Lumpur PLUS	Kuala Lumpur		
PP Kampung Seronok FC	Penang		
Selangor MPSJ	Selangor		
Selangor Proton	Selangor		
Selangor SUKSES FC	Selangor		

== League table ==
Pos	Team	Pld	W	D	L	GF	GA	GD	Pts	Promotion, qualification or relegation
1	MPSJ FC	2	0	1	1	5	7	−2	1	Qualified to knockout stage
2	ATM FA	2	1	1	0	4	1	+3	4	Qualified to knockout stage & Promotion to 2006–07 Malaysia Premier League
3	Pasir Gudang United F.C.	2	1	0	1	4	2	+2	3	Qualified to knockout stage & Promotion to 2006–07 Malaysia Premier League
4	SAJ FC	1	1	0	0	3	2	+1	3	Qualified to knockout stage
5	Proton FC	2	0	1	1	3	4	−1	1	Qualified to knockout stage
6	PLUS FC	19	10	6	3	52	29	+23	36	Qualified to knockout stage & Promotion to 2006–07 Malaysia Premier League
7	Kuala Muda Naza	1	0	0	1	1	4	−3	0	Qualified to knockout stage & Promotion to 2006–07 Malaysia Premier League
8	SUKSES FC	2	0	1	1	4	6	−2	1	Qualified to knockout stage
9	DBKL FC	2	0	1	1	2	4	−2	1	
10	KL Kesas F.C.	2	0	0	2	1	10	−9	0	
11	Kuala Lumpur Maju United	1	0	1	0	0	0	0	1	
12	PP Kampung Seronok F.C.	2	0	0	2	2	12	−10	0	

Updated to match(es) played on unknown. Source:
Rules for classification: 1) Points; 2) Goal difference; 3) Number of goals scored.
