= 2026–27 Piala Presiden =

Football league in Malaysia

Malaysia President Cup

Tournament details
- Country: Malaysia
- Dates: 18 April – 22 November 2026
- Teams: 11

Tournament statistics
- Matches played: 3
- Goals scored: 8 (2.67 per match)
- All statistics correct as of 19 April 2026.

The 2026–27 Piala Presiden (transl. President Cup) is the 40th season of the Piala Presiden since its establishment in 1985. It is the youth level (U-20) football league in Malaysia. JDT III are the defending champions. 11 teams compete in this season, playing 20 home-and-away matches.

== Rules ==
=== Age limit ===
2026–27 Piala Presiden (Malaysia) is an amateur football competition in Malaysia for under-21 players. Since its inception in 1986, the Piala Presiden has been a major tournament for under-21 and under-23 players. In 2009, the format of the competition was changed with only under-20 players eligible to fill in for the tournament that. Players must be under 20 years old, aligning with the Asian Football Confederation (AFC) youth tournament cycles.

=== Format ===
The tournament is played as follows:

- League level: The tournament follows a double round-robin league format, where each of the 11 participating teams plays 20 matches (home and away). The winner of the final (over two legs) — via aggregate score, or penalties if necessary — is crowned the Piala Presiden Champion for the season.

== Teams ==
The following teams are participating in the 2026–27 Piala Presiden.

Team	Location	Stadium
AMD U17	Gambang, Pahang	Padang 10 AMD Gambang
Johor Darul Ta'zim III	Pasir Gudang	Pasir Gudang Corporation Stadium
Kedah FA U20	Jitra	MPKP Mini Stadium
Kuala Lumpur FA U20	Kuala Lumpur	Kuala Lumpur Stadium
Kuching City FC U20	Kota Samarahan	Kota Samarahan Sports Complex
MISC-Touchtronics U20	Shah Alam	UiTM Stadium
Negeri Sembilan FC III	Kuala Pilah	Kuala Pilah Mini Stadium
Penang FC II	Gelugor	USM Stadium
Sabah FC II	Kota Kinabalu	Likas Stadium
Selangor FC U20	Kuala Lumpur	Mindef Stadium
Terengganu FC II	Kuala Terengganu	Sultan Ismail Nasiruddin Shah Stadium

== Personnel, kit and sponsoring ==
Team	Head coach	Captain	Kit manufacturer	Sponsor
AMD U17	(Malaysia) Noor Zaidi bin Rohmat	(Malaysia) Muhammad Iman Irfan Hapis	Let's Play	N/A
Johor Darul Ta'zim III	(Spain) Pedro Collado Celda	(Malaysia) Adib Ibrahim Adnan	Nike	JDT Fan Token
Kedah FA U20	(Malaysia) Fauzi Nan	(Malaysia) Aiman Naufal Khalil	Adidas	N/A
Kuala Lumpur FA U20	(Malaysia) Iqbal Hanafi Masduki	(Malaysia) Izzat Irfan Ahmad Zahairi	StarSports	N/A
Kuching City FC II	(Malaysia) Hakimi Man	(Malaysia) Ariff Iskandar Siri	StarSports	City of Unity
MISC-Touchtronics U20	(Malaysia) Rashid Mahmud	(Malaysia) Pravinash Ravindran	Select	N/A
Negeri Sembilan FC III	(Malaysia) Hamdan Mohamad	(Malaysia) Muhammad Azri Hanif Noor	Warrix	N/A
Penang FC II	(Malaysia) Hasbul Hazani Daud	(Malaysia) Muhammad Aidil Wafiy Yusri	Kaki Jersi	Penang2030
Sabah FC II	(Malaysia) Rafie Robert	(Malaysia) Angelo Christino Ansaman	Carino	Ararat
Selangor FC U20	(Malaysia) Muhammad Firdaus Aziz	(Malaysia) Mulia Hairi Mulia Sugeharto	Joma	PKNS / MBI
Terengganu FC II	(Malaysia) Subri Sulong	(Malaysia) Farish Daniel Mohd Rahima	ALX	TFCPLAY

== Standings ==
Pos	Team	Pld	W	D	L	GF	GA	GD	Pts	Qualification or relegation
1	Johor Darul Ta'zim III (C)	5	5	0	0	16	1	+15	15	League Champion
2	Terengganu FC II	4	3	1	0	9	3	+6	10	
3	Selangor FC U20	4	3	0	1	10	6	+4	9	
4	Kuching City FC U20	4	2	1	1	5	5	0	7	
5	AMD U17	5	2	1	2	7	8	−1	7	
6	MISC-Touchtronics U20	4	1	3	0	4	3	+1	6	
7	Kedah FA U20	4	1	0	3	3	6	−3	3	
8	Sabah FC II	5	1	0	4	3	7	−4	3	
9	Negeri Sembilan FC III	5	0	3	2	1	11	−10	3	
10	Penang FC II	5	0	2	3	2	8	−6	2	
11	Kuala Lumpur FA U20	3	0	1	2	0	2	−2	1	

Updated to match(es) played on 20 June 2026. Source: FAM-CMS
Rules for classification: 1) Points; 2) Goal difference; 3) Number of goals scored.
(C) League Champion

== Results table ==
Home \ Away	AMD	JDT	KLC	KUC	MIS	NEG	KED	PEN	SAB	SEL	TER
AMD U17		1–4	–	–	–	–	–	0–0	–	3–4	–
Johor Darul Ta'zim III	–		1–0	–	–	6–0	–	4–0	–	–	–
Kuala Lumpur FA U20	0–1	–		–	–	–	–	–	–	–	–
Kuching City FC U20	–	–	–		–	–	–	1–0	–	–	–
MISC-Touchtronics U20	–	–	–	1–1		0–0	–	–	–	2–1	–
Negeri Sembilan FC III	–	–	0–0	–	–		–	–	–	–	0–4
Kedah FA U20	–	0–1	–	–	–	–		–	1–0	–	2–3
Penang FC II	–	–	–	–	–	1–1	–		1–2	–	–
Sabah FC II	0–2	–	–	–	–	–	–	–		–	–
Selangor FC U20	–	–	–	3–1	–	–	2–0	–	–		–
Terengganu FC II	–	–	–	–	1–1	–	–	–	–	–	

Updated to match(es) played on 20 June 2026. Source: FAM-CMS
Legend: Blue = home team win; Yellow = draw; Red = away team win.
For upcoming matches, an "a" indicates there is an article about the rivalry between the two participants.

== Season statistics ==
=== Top goalscorers ===
As of 20 June 2026

Rank	Player	Club	Goals
1	(Malaysia) Muhammad Daniesh	Johor Darul Ta'zim III	7
2	(Malaysia) Abid Safaraz Rozaidi	Johor Darul Ta'zim III	4
3	(Malaysia) Nabil Fitri Mustaffa	Selangor FC U20	3
3	(Malaysia) Ibrahim Nyass Ilmu Firaz	Terengganu FC U20	3
3	(Malaysia) Adam Haikal Mizan	Terengganu FC U20	3
3	(Malaysia) Iman Alif Hasman	Terengganu FC U20	3
7	(Malaysia) Arfan Haziq	AMD U17	2
7	(Malaysia) Iman Irfan Hapis	AMD U17	2
7	(Malaysia) Adib Ibrahim Adnan	Johor Darul Ta'zim III	2
7	(Malaysia) Amran Shah Mohd Anuar	Kuching City U20	2
7	(Malaysia) Pravinash Ravindran	MISC-Touchtronics U20	2
7	(Malaysia) Zarul Aidid Mokhtar	Selangor FC U20	2

=== Own goals ===
As of 19 April 2026

Rank	Player	Team	Against	Date	Number
1	(Malaysia) Afiq Zimam Shahril Izzuddin	Negeri Sembilan III	Johor Darul Ta'zim III	18 April 2026	1
1	(Malaysia) Rosyamsyierul Syafiq	Kedah FA U20	Selangor FC U20	19 April 2025	1

== See also ==
- 2026–27 Piala Belia
