= Malaysian Malay's Football Association =

Malaysian football club

Malaysian Malay's Football Association ڤرساتوان بولا سيڤق ملايو مليسيا
- Founded: 19 April 1947; 79 years ago as Peninsular Malay Football Federation
- Purpose: Football association
- Headquarters: No. U15/Sec. U15 40170 3, Jalan SP 1/8 Taman Subang Perdana, Shah Alam, 40150
- Location: Shah Alam, Selangor, Malaysia
- President: Mohd. Firdaus Bin Mohamed

Malaysian Malay's Football Association (Malay: Persatuan Bola Sepak Melayu Malaysia (PBSMM)), is a Malaysian football organization that promotes and organizes football activities among the Malay community in Malaysia. The association is primarily known for organizing the Piala Agong and Piala Emas Raja-Raja, one of the country's oldest football competitions.

PBSMM also sent a team to compete in the Malaysia FAM Cup for the 2016 Malaysia FAM Cup edition.

== History ==
Malaysian Malay's Football Association was established to provide structured football development and competitive opportunities for Malay football associations across Malaysian states. The organization emerged during the early development of organized football in Malaya, with the aim of strengthening grassroots participation and preserving traditional inter-state competitions.

Throughout its history, PBSMM has functioned alongside the national governing body, the Football Association of Malaysia (FAM), while maintaining a distinct focus on community-based and heritage tournaments.

== Organization ==
PBSMM consists of state-level Malay football associations representing various states in Malaysia. These state associations participate in competitions organized under PBSMM, particularly the annual Piala Emas Raja-Raja tournament.

The association focuses on:

- Organizing inter-state competitions
- Supporting grassroots football development
- Providing competitive platforms for amateur and semi-professional players

== Association management ==
=== 2021 - 2025 ===
Positions	Name
President	(Malaysia) Mohd Firdaus Bin Mohamed., PMC
Deputy president 1	(Malaysia) Ybhg. Datuk Haji Ramlan Bin Haji Shahean @Askolani ., PMW
Deputy president 2	(Malaysia) YM Dato' Lela Putera Dato Kamarulnizam Bin YTM Dato Haji Mohd Sharip.,DTNS.,ANS.,PMC
Vice president 1	(Malaysia) YBhg. Dato’ Shaharul Bin Asafali.,DSPN
Vice president 2	(Malaysia) Mohd Zamri Bin Mazleh
Vice president 3	(Malaysia) YBhg. Dato’ Ahmad Bin Mad Daud.,DSDK
Vice president 4	(Malaysia) Haji Nudin Bin Awang
General secretary	(Malaysia) Encik Nazeri Bin Hussain
Executive committee 1	(Malaysia) Abdul Rafi Bin Abdul Murad.,PMC
Executive committee 2	(Malaysia) Sani Bin Haji Kalam
Executive committee 3	(Malaysia) YH Dato Khairuddin Bin Abdul Hamid., DIMP
Executive committee 4	(Malaysia) YM Ku Besry Bin Ku Aziz
Auditor 1	(Malaysia) Nor Shahimy Bin Md. Nor
Auditor 2	(Malaysia) Saifull Bahri Bin Shamshul Anwar

== Competitions ==
=== Piala Emas Raja-Raja ===
The Piala Emas Raja-Raja (King's Gold Cup) is the flagship competition organized by PBSMM. First held in the early 20th century, it is recognized as one of Malaysia's longest-running football tournaments. The competition features teams representing state Malay football associations.

Over the years, the tournament has served as a developmental platform for players who later progressed to professional football within Malaysia.

=== Role in Malaysian Football ===
Although PBSMM does not administer Malaysia's professional football leagues, it contributes to the broader football ecosystem by maintaining historical competitions and encouraging grassroots participation. The association plays a role in preserving Malay football heritage and providing opportunities for emerging players.

== Associations affiliation ==
- Kedah Malay's F.A.
- Terengganu Malay's F.A.
- Negeri Sembilan Malay's F.A.
- Kuala Lumpur Malay's F.A.
- Perlis Malay's F.A.
- Penang Malay's F.A.
- Perak Malay's F.A.
- (Malacca) Melaka Malay's F.A.
- Johor Malay's F.A.
- Pahang Malay's F.A.
- Selangor Malay's F.A.
- Kelantan Malay's F.A.

== See also ==
- Football Association of Malaysia
- History of Malaysian football
- Football in Malaysia
- Piala Emas Raja-Raja
