= S. Veloo =

Malaysian football manager

Personal information
- Full name: Veloo a/l Sinnathamby
- Date of birth: 9 November 1966 (age 60)
- Place of birth: Johor, Malaysia

Team information
- Current team: Mokhtar Dahari Academy (team manager)

Managerial career
- Years: Team
- 2006–2009: Penang
- 2010–2012: USM
- 2012–2014: Blackburn Rovers Football Academy
- 2015–2015: Penang FA U21
- 2016–2017: Sarawak FA
- 2018–2019: NFDP
- 2020–2022: Mokhtar Dahari Academy
- 2023–: Mokhtar Dahari Academy

Veloo a/l Sinnathamby, better known as S. Veloo, (born 9 November 1966) is a Malaysian football manager.

== Career ==
Veloo has coached in various levels in Malaysia, such as Johor state school football team, MASUM (Malaysian University Sports Council), and the Football Association of Malaysia academy in Penang. He had been an assistant coach in Penang FA since 2006. He later was appointed the head coach of USM FC. In the 2010 Malaysia Premier League, the university club finished ninth out of 12 teams. The next season was better for Veloo's team, finishing 6th out of 12 teams, barely missing the play-off spot to the 2011 Malaysia Cup tournament. In the 2012 Malaysia Premier League campaign, the team consolidated their place in the league with another mid-table finish, again at 6th place. Veloo also guided the team into the round of 16 of the 2012 Malaysia FA Cup, beating Pos Malaysia FC in the round of 32. They were beaten by eventual finalists Sime Darby FC. After a year at NFDP, he joined Mokhtar Dahari Academy as the U17 coach. Since then, he has moved to the team manager position.
