= Kuala Lumpur Rangers F.C. (women) =

Malaysian women's association football club

KL Rangers Women
- Full name: Kuala Lumpur Rangers Football Club Women
- Short name: KLRW
- Founded: 2018; 8 years ago, as Setiawangsa Rangers FC
- Ground: Setiawangsa Stadium
- Capacity: 1,000
- President: Khushairi Aizad Jamalludin
- Head coach: Mohd Arsyah Ayob
- League: National Women's League; FAS Women's Super League; Liga Puteri-FAM
- Website: https://klrangers.com
| Home colours | Away colours |

KL Rangers FC Women is a Malaysian professional women's football club based in Setiawangsa, Federal Territories of Malaysia. They compete in the National Women's League, the top flight of women's football in Malaysia, and the FAS Women's Super League, the women's football league in Selangor. They play their home games at the Setiawangsa Stadium, with select games at the MPAJ Stadium and the Sime Darby Training Ground.

== History ==
They are the women's section of Kuala Lumpur Rangers. The club competes in the FAS Women's Super League (FASWSL). They finished as runners-up in the Kuala Lumpur Women’s Super League and reached the semifinals of the Sukma Games in Sarawak as part of the Federal Territories team.

== Players ==
As of 23 October 2025

Note: Flags indicate national team as defined under FIFA eligibility rules; some limited exceptions apply. Players may hold more than one non-FIFA nationality.

| No. | Pos. | Nation | Player |
|---|---|---|---|
| 1 | GK | MAS | Nur Azizah Nazri |
| 2 | DF | MAS | Rogayah Ali |
| 3 | DF | MAS | Mira Fazliana Aidi (captain) |
| 4 | DF | MAS | Putri Nurbatrisyia |
| 5 | MF | MAS | Nur Zulizambalqis |
| 7 | FW | MAS | Muskan Abdul Majid |
| 8 | MF | MAS | Nur Izzati Ghani |
| 10 | FW | MAS | Azza Harmiza Basharudin |
| 11 | DF | MAS | Nik Nurain Izyan |
| 13 | DF | MAS | Nurlidya Natasha |
| 14 | FW | IDN | Carla Bio |
| 15 | FW | MAS | Aina Amira |
| 16 | MF | MAS | Erlya Syazwien |

| No. | Pos. | Nation | Player |
|---|---|---|---|
| 17 | FW | MAS | Farzana Afrina |
| 18 | DF | MAS | Qiasatina Tijani |
| 19 | MF | MAS | Hazellya Darwisyah |
| 20 | FW | MAS | Azza Harniza |
| 21 | DF | MAS | Nurin Batrisyia |
| 22 | FW | IDN | Adinda Situmorang |
| 24 | FW | MAS | Fatihah Mat Terjeri |
| 25 | GK | MAS | Farhana Nabila |
| 32 | MF | MAS | Angela Kais |
| 33 | GK | MAS | Farah Syakira |
| 35 | FW | MAS | Nursuriani Mazli |
| 37 | GK | MAS | Adriana Batrisyia |

== Development squad (U16) ==
Currently playing in the Liga Puteri-FAM.

As of 15 July 2025

| Number | Pos | Nat | Name | Age |
|---|---|---|---|---|
| 2 | DF | (Malaysia) | Nur Shaza Ahza Bt Ahmad Shah | 13 |
| 3 | MF | (Malaysia) | Adele Darwisyah Bt Saiful Anuar | 16 |
| 4 | DF | (Malaysia) | Zara Arissa Bt Mohammad Zahid | 13 |
| 5 | DF | (Malaysia) | Dewi Nuradillah Damia Bt Hamdan | 14 |
| 6 | DF | (Malaysia) | Puteri Rafaina Bt Md Rabiee | 15 |
| 7 | DF | (Malaysia) | Nur Chinta Qairah Qistina Bt Amir Hamzah | 13 |
| 9 | FW | (Malaysia) | Qisya Amni Bt Shahril | 15 |
| 10 | MF | (Malaysia) | Siti Shafina Bt Mohd Rahimi | 14 |
| 11 | FW | (Malaysia) | Nur Addina Batrisya Bt Zahaimi | 16 |
| 12 | FW | (Malaysia) | Chinta Ellisya Bt Noor Shahril Azri | 15 |
| 13 | MF | (Malaysia) | Nur Adriana Aisyah Bt Fakhrul Anuar | 13 |
| 14 | MF | (Malaysia) | Marissa Zara Bt Roszaidi | 15 |
| 16 | DF | (Malaysia) | Nur Liyana Sofea Bt Ibrahim | 14 |
| 17 | MF | (Malaysia) | Nur Aishah Athirah Bt Abdullah | 13 |
| 18 | MF | (Malaysia) | Intan Idriyana Bt Abdullah | 15 |
| 19 | MF | (Malaysia) | Zara Alesya Bt Mohammad Zahid | 13 |
| 21 | MF | (Malaysia) | Adellia Myiesha Bt Mohd Ridzwan | 13 |
| 22 | MF | (Malaysia) | Amira Humaira Bt Abdul Aziz | 15 |
| 23 | MF | (Malaysia) | Nur Sofiya Zahra Bt Mohammad Taufik | 13 |
| 24 | FW | (Malaysia) | Nur Aleesya Eyzara Bt Mohd Ridzuan | 13 |
| 26 | DF | (Malaysia) | Nur Qistina Damia Bt Noor Hanizam | 13 |
| 27 | DF | (Malaysia) | Dhaniyah Sofea Bt Sahrul Azwan | 13 |
| 28 | MF | (Malaysia) | Dhiya Safiyya Bt Abdul Latiff | 15 |
| 30 | GK | (Malaysia) | Hani Malaeka Bt Halipah | 13 |
| 55 | GK | (Malaysia) | Wan Nur Shafinas Bt Wan Hamdan | 13 |

== Coaching staff ==
As of 23 October 2025

| Position | Staff |
|---|---|
| Team manager | (Malaysia) Nur Izwani Azman |
| Technical director | (Malaysia) Khushairi Aizad Jamalludin |
| Head coach | (Malaysia) Mohd Arsyah Ayob |
| Assistant head coach | (Malaysia) Farah Dhiba |
| Goalkeeper coach | (Malaysia) Mohd Al-Husairi Ibrahim |
| Physiotherapist | (Malaysia) Salwa Yusup |
| Team coordinator | (Malaysia) Khairol Azry Abdul Rahman |
| Team admin | (Malaysia) Nur Hidayah Abu Bakar |
| Team media | (Malaysia) Muhammad Amirul Afiq |
| Kitman | (Malaysia) Mohd Shahnizman Mohd Saad |
