= Piala Presiden (Malaysia) =

Malaysian football league

- Founded: 1985; 41 years ago
- Country: Malaysia
- Confederation: AFC
- Number of clubs: 20
- Current champions: (Johor) JDT III (6 titles)
- Most championships: Kelantan U21 (7 titles)
- Broadcaster: Astro Arena
- Current: 2026–27 Piala Presiden

The Piala Presiden (English: President's Cup) is a developmental football competition in Malaysia for under-20 players. The cup consists of developmental squads from clubs competing in the top two divisions of Malaysian football league system.

The president in the title refers to the President of Football Association of Malaysia as the country did not have a president, but rather a king. It exists alongside the youth competition for under-18 players, the Piala Belia.

== History ==
Since its inception in 1985, Piala Presiden has been the major tournament for Under-21 and Under-23 players. In 1990 season, Football Association of Malaysia and Majlis Sukan Negara combine the tournament with Sukan Malaysia (SUKMA) football tournament, making Sarawak the only team to won the combined tournament. The format for the tournament has seen a lot of changes as in 2009 the format of the competition was changed with only Under-20 players eligible to be fielded for the tournament. In 2015, the format of the competition was reverted to the original format with Under-21 players and three overage players eligible to play.

In 2016, the tournament format was also changed with the competing clubs divided into two groups and played a round-robin leg with four top clubs from each group at the end of the season qualifying for the playoff round to determine the champion. The final match for the cup is broadcast by Astro Arena.

== Logo evolution ==
Since the competition began in 1985, its branding has changed multiple times to match different sponsors, with a redesigned logo introduced for the 2017 season.

The logo that was used from 2013 until the end of the 2016 season.

== Champions ==
Seasons	Champions	Score	Runners-up
1985	Kelantan U21	2–0	Sarawak U21
1986	Singapore FA	2–0	Perlis FA
1987	Johor FA	7–2	Selangor U21
1988	Selangor U21	2–0	Kelantan U21
1989	Kuala Lumpur FA	2–1	Perak U21
1990	Sarawak U21	4–0	Malacca U21
1991	Kedah FA	2–1	Johor FA
1992	Kuala Lumpur FA	1–0 (a.e.t.)	Johor FA
1993	Malacca U21	3–2	Negeri Sembilan FA
1994	Selangor U21	3–1	Sabah FA
1995	Kelantan U21	2–1	Kuala Lumpur FA
1996	Terengganu FA	2–2 (a.e.t.) 4–2 (PSO)	Sabah FA
1997	Selangor U21	6–2	Sabah FA
1998	Kuala Lumpur FA	3-0	Sarawak U21
1999	Sabah FA	3–1	Selangor U21
2000	Kedah FA	2-0	Selangor U21
2001	Negeri Sembilan FA	1–0	Selangor U21
2002	Negeri Sembilan FA	3–0	Pahang FA
2003	Kedah FA	2–0	Kelantan U21
2004	Penang FA	2–1	Johor FA
2005	Kelantan U21	1–0	(Johor) Pasir Gudang United
2005–06	Terengganu FA	2–0	Selangor MPPJ
2006–07	Perak U21	3–3 (a.e.t.) 5–4 (PSO)	Kelantan U21
2007–08	Selangor U21	1–0	Perak U21
2009	Johor FC	4–0	Terengganu FA
2010	(Kuala Lumpur) Bukit Jalil Sports School	1–0	Kuala Lumpur FA
2011	Kelantan U21	2–1 (a.e.t.)	(Johor) MP Muar FC
2012	Perak U21	1–0	(Negeri Sembilan) Betaria FC
2013	Kelantan U21	2–1	Perak U21
2014	Perak U21	3–2	Pahang FA
2015	Kelantan U21	2–1	Penang FA
2016	Kelantan U21	3–1 on aggregate	(Terengganu) T-Team U21
2017	Selangor U21	2–1 on aggregate	Terengganu U21
2018	Terengganu FC III	2–1 (a.e.t.)	Kedah U21
2019	(Selangor) PKNS U21	2–1 on aggregate	(Negeri Sembilan) Perak U21
2020	cancelled and declared null and void due to COVID-19 pandemic		
2021	cancelled and declared null and void due to COVID-19 pandemic		
2022	(Johor) JDT III	2-2, 2-0 4–2 on aggregate	Sri Pahang U21
2023	(Johor) JDT III	3-1, 2-0 5–1 on aggregate	Negeri Sembilan
2024	(Johor) JDT III	2-1, 0-0 2–1 on aggregate	Selangor U21
2025	(Johor) JDT III	RR	Selangor U20
2026	(Johor) JDT III	RR	TBD

== Team records ==
Team	Champion	Runner Up
Kelantan U21	7 (1985, 1995, 2005, 2011, 2013, 2015, 2016)	3 (1988, 2003, 2007)
Johor Darul Ta'zim III	6 (2009, 2022, 2023, 2024, 2025, 2026)	—
Selangor U-21	5 (1988, 1994, 1997, 2008, 2017)	6 (1987, 1999, 2000, 2001, 2024, 2025)
Perak U-21	3 (2007, 2012, 2014)	4 (1989, 2008, 2013, 2019)
Kuala Lumpur City U-21	3 (1989, 1992, 1998)	2 (1995, 2010)
Kedah Darul Aman U-21	3 (1991, 2000, 2003)	1 (2018)
Terengganu III	3 (1996, 2006, 2018)	1 (2009)
Negeri Sembilan U-21	2 (2001, 2002)	2 (1993, 2023)
Sabah U-21	1 (1999)	3 (1994, 1996, 1997)
Johor FA U-21	1 (1987)	3 (1991, 1992, 2004)
Sarawak U-21	1 (1990)	2 (1985, 1998)
(Malacca) Melaka United U-21	1 (1993)	1 (1990)
Penang U-21	1 (2004)	1 (2015)
Singapore B-21	1 (1986)	—
(Malaysia) SSBJ U-21	1 (2010)	—
(Selangor) PKNS U-21	1 (2019)	—
Sri Pahang U-21	—	3 (2002, 2014, 2022)
Perlis U-21	—	1 (1986)
(Johor) Pasir Gudang United U-21	—	1 (2005)
(Selangor) MPPJ U-21	—	1 (2006)
(Johor) MP Muar U-21	—	1 (2011)
(Negeri Sembilan) Betaria U-21	—	1 (2012)
(Terengganu) T-Team U-21	—	1 (2016)

== See also ==
- FAM Football Awards
