= National Football Development Programme of Malaysia =

- Full name: National Football Development Programme of Malaysia; Program Pembangunan; Bola Sepak Negara Malaysia
- Nickname(s): NFDP Malaysia; PPBN Malaysia
- Founded: 2011; 14 years ago
- Jurisdiction: Ministry of Education, Ministry of Youths; National Sports Council, Malaysia Sport School
- Website: Website

The National Football Development Programme of Malaysia (NFDP Malaysia) (Malay: Program Pembangunan Bola Sepak Negara Malaysia) (PPBN; abbrev: NFDP) is a youth football development programme created by the Ministry of Youths and Ministry of Education with the co-operation of National Sports Council and Malaysia Sport School with the long-term plan to promote and develop the sport nationally.

== History ==
=== Introduction ===
The National Football Development Programme of Malaysia (NFDP) is a long-term, government-backed initiative aimed at nurturing and developing young football talent across the country. It was officially launched in 2014 with the vision of improving the overall standard of Malaysian football and eventually qualifying for major international tournaments. The NFDP was launched by the Malaysia's Ministry of Youth and Sports. The idea was inspired by the football academies and youth development structures seen in successful footballing nations. The programme was designed to create a player development pathway — starting from grassroots up to the elite level — with the long-term ambition of qualifying for the FIFA U-17 World Cup, FIFA U-20 World Cup, and ultimately the FIFA World Cup.

The programme focuses on grassroots football development for children aged 7–12 to develop basic skills and passion for the game, state development centres to identify and train players aged 13–17, identifying and training players through structured talent identification and development pathway, providing world-class training facilities and coaching — most notably through the Mokhtar Dahari Academy (AMD), which serves as the national football academy for top youth prospects, collaborating with international partners. The NFDP works to develop players holistically — focusing not only on technical and tactical skills but also on fitness, psychology, nutrition, holistic development, and education.

=== Current status ===
The NFDP continues to produce youth national teams for regional competitions like the AFF U-16, and U-19 championships. There’s a growing pipeline of players from AMD moving into the Malaysia Super League clubs, and making senior national team debuts. The programme is focusing more on international exposure, sending young talents for overseas training stints and tournaments in Europe and Asia.

== See also ==
- Mokhtar Dahari Academy (AMD)
- Singa Muda Perlis F.C.
- Harimau Muda A
- LionsXII
- FAM-MSN Project
