= Pasir Gudang United F.C. =

Malaysian football club

Pasir Gudang United
- Full name: Pasir Gudang United Football Club
- Nickname: The Authorities
- Founded: 2005; 21 years ago
- Ground: JCorp Stadium, Pasir Gudang, Johor
- Capacity: 15,000
- League: PBNJ State League
| Home colours | Away colours |

Pasir Gudang United Football Club was a Malaysian professional football club based in Pasir Gudang, Johor. Representing the Pasir Gudang local authority (Pihak Berkuasa Tempatan Pasir Gudang), the club competed in the Malaysia FAM Cup and played its home matches at the 15,000-capacity Pasir Gudang Corporation Stadium (formerly known as JCorp Stadium).

== History ==
=== Formation and 2006 FAM Cup triumph ===
Founded in 2005, Pasir Gudang United entered the third tier of Malaysian football, the Malaysia FAM Cup. During the 2006 season, under the management of Azuan Zain, the club progressed through the group and knockout stages to reach the 2006 FAM Cup final. They defeated ATM FA 3–0 in the final to claim their first major title and secure promotion to the 2006–07 Malaysia Premier League

In the 2006 Malaysia FA Cup, the team exited in the first round after a 3–2 aggregate defeat to PKNS (drawing 1–1 in the first leg and losing 2–1 in the second).

=== Merger with Johor FA ===
Despite winning promotion to the second tier, Pasir Gudang United never competed under its original name in the Malaysia Premier League. Prior to the 2006–07 season, the Johor Football Association (Johor FA) proposed a merger between the state team and Pasir Gudang United to consolidate resources and field a stronger squad.

The club agreed to the merger, and the combined side competed as Johor-Pasir Gudang (officially Johor PBT Pasir Gudang). Competing under this merged banner, the team reached the semi-finals of the 2007 Malaysia FA Cup, where they were eliminated by Perlis FA on the away goals rule.

=== Legacy ===
In 2009, the merged entity dropped the Pasir Gudang branding to revert to Johor FA. The team was subsequently rebranded as Johor United in 2012 before undergoing a major restructuring in 2014 to become Johor Darul Ta'zim II (JDT II), serving as the reserve and feeder club for Johor Darul Ta'zim F.C..

== Stadium ==
Pasir Gudang United played its home games at the Pasir Gudang Corporation Stadium in Pasir Gudang, Johor, which has a capacity of 15,000 spectators.

== Honours ==
=== Domestic ===
- Malaysia FAM Cup
  - Winners (1): 2006
