= Johor Darul Ta'zim III F.C. =

Malaysian football club

Johor Darul Ta'zim III
- Full name: Johor Darul Ta'zim Football Club
- Nickname: Southern Tigers
- Founded: 2014; 12 years ago
- Ground: Pasir Gudang Corporation Stadium
- Capacity: 15,000
- Owner: Tunku Ismail Sultan Ibrahim
- Chairman: Tunku Aminah Sultan Ismail
- League: Piala Presiden; Piala Belia
- Website: http://johorsoutherntigers.com.my/

Johor Darul Ta'zim III Football Club (commonly referred to as JDT III) is a Malaysian professional youth football club based in Pasir Gudang, Johor. Serving as the primary developmental under-20/under-21 squad of Johor Darul Ta'zim F.C., the club competes in the Piala Presiden (President's Cup) and plays its home matches at the 15,000-capacity Pasir Gudang Corporation Stadium.

== History ==
=== Formation and early years (2014–2019) ===
The club was established in 2014 as Johor Pasir Gudang Football Club following a comprehensive restructuring of Johor's football ecosystem initiated by Tunku Ismail Sultan Ibrahim. In 2015, the team was formally integrated into the parent club's hierarchy and rebranded as Johor Darul Ta'zim III F.C. During its formative years, JDT III competed in the Malaysia FAM League then the third tier of the Malaysian football league system to provide young players with competitive senior-level match experience before transitioning permanently into the national youth championship structure. Starting in the 2020 season, Pasir Gudang Corporation Stadium was designated as the exclusive home venue for JDT III.

=== Domestic youth dominance (2022–present) ===
Operating exclusively with domestic Malaysian players, JDT III established an unprecedented era of dominance in the Piala Presiden during the 2020s. After capturing the title in 2022, 2023, 2024, and 2025, the squad won its fifth consecutive championship and sixth overall in October 2026. Managed by Spanish head coach Pedro Collado Celda, JDT III clinched the 2026 title with three league matches remaining after a 2–1 victory over runners-up Terengganu FC U-20, accumulating an unassailable 49 points.

=== JDT Academy pathway ===
Within the Johor Darul Ta'zim Academy pyramid, JDT III occupies the tier immediately above the under-18 squad (JDT IV, which competes in the Piala Belia) and serves as the primary feeder team for reserve side JDT II and the senior JDT first team. The squad's curriculum emphasizes European-style tactical periodization, sports science, and high-performance conditioning to prepare academy graduates for professional senior football and Malaysian national youth selections.

=== SUKMA representation ===
In addition to club competitions, JDT III forms the core of the Johor state football contingent at the biennial Malaysia Games (SUKMA). At the 2026 SUKMA XXII held in Selangor, the JDT III-backed Johor squad won the state's first-ever gold medal in men's football, defeating hosts Selangor 4–2 in a penalty shootout following a 1–1 draw in the final at Petaling Jaya City Council Stadium on 22 August 2026.

== Players ==
=== Current squad ===
As of September 2026

Note: Flags indicate national team as defined under FIFA eligibility rules; some limited exceptions apply. Players may hold more than one non-FIFA nationality.

No.	Pos.	Nation	Player
2	DF	MAS	Januwaar Gopal
4	MF	MAS	Afiq Hakimi Mahat
6	MF	MAS	Raja Norfirdaus
7	MF	MAS	Aisy Aqasha Noorazhar
8	MF	MAS	Adam Mustaqim
9	FW	MAS	Aisy Al-Hakim
10	DF	MAS	Izzuddin Afif
11	MF	MAS	Danish Imran Md Yazid
12	FW	MAS	Abid Safaraz Rozaidi
13	FW	MAS	Daniesh Amirruddin
14	DF	MAS	Qahir Dzakirin
15	DF	MAS	Zamir Zairi
17	FW	MAS	Don Damien Derwin
18	GK	MAS	Ahmad Lutfil Hadi

No.	Pos.	Nation	Player
19	MF	MAS	Adib Ibrahim
20	DF	MAS	Ammar Shauqi Azri
21	MF	MAS	Adam Haikal Hisarudin
22	MF	MAS	Afiq Danish Zulkifli (captain)
23	DF	MAS	Arayyan Hakeem
24	DF	MAS	Nor Ezawi Nor Azman
25	MF	MAS	Ierfan Hafizan
27	GK	MAS	Arami Wafiy
28	MF	MAS	Aqim Hazmi Hasmadi
29	MF	MAS	Erie Afiezal
30	MF	MAS	Muhammad Saifuddin
33	GK	MAS	Danish Darus
47	MF	MAS	Nizhareef Irfan
90	MF	MAS	Arsyad Shamsul Aswadi

== Honours ==
=== Domestic ===
Malaysia President Cup

- Winners (6): 2009, 2022, 2023, 2024, 2025, 2026

Sukma Games (representing Johor)

- (gold) Gold Medal (1): 2026
