= Mokhtar Dahari Academy =

Malaysian football club

Akademi Bola Sepak Negara Mokhtar Dahari
- Full name: Mokhtar Dahari National Football Academy
- Nickname: AMD
- Founded: 10 April 2014; 12 years ago
- Ground: Kampung Melayu Gambang
- Coordinates: 3.720897°N 103.109918°E
- Jurisdiction: Ministry of Education, Ministry of Youths, NFDP Malaysia, National Sports Council, Malaysia Sport School

The Mokhtar Dahari National Football Academy (Malay: Akademi Bola Sepak Negara Mokhtar Dahari; abbrev: AMD) is a youth football development academy in Malaysia, established in April 2014. Its goal is to identify and train local talents with producing world-class footballers. The academy is named after the late Mokhtar Dahari, one of Malaysia's greatest football legends.

== History ==
The AMD was established under the initiative of the National Football Development Programme of Malaysia (NFDP) and began operating in Gambang, Pahang, with modern facilities and international-class training programmes, focusing on extended training duration and integrating mental resilience into the curriculum.

== Governance ==
The academy is run under the National Sports Council (NSC) and the Football Association of Malaysia (FAM). It typically focuses on players aged between 13 and 17. The AMD provides both professional football training and academic education to ensure players grow physically and intellectually, playing a crucial role in nurturing young talents who would later represent Malaysia in national youth squads like Harimau Muda and the senior Harimau Malaya team.

== Notable AMD graduates ==
| Name | Position | National team |
|---|---|---|
| Anjasmirza Saharudin | Defender | Malaysia national under-16 football team |
| Aisy Al-Hakim | Defender | Malaysia national under-16 football team |
| Irfan Zakwan | Midfielder | Malaysia national under-16 football team |
| Aiman Yusuf | Forward | Malaysia national under-16 football team |
| Nabil Fitri | Forward | Malaysia national under-16 football team |
| Faez Iqhwan | Goalkeeper | Malaysia national under-19 football team |
| Afiq Hakimi | Defender | Malaysia national under-19 football team |

== International recognition ==
The AMD's under-17 player Irfan Aswad Roslan has been selected to undergo a trial session with the J1 League club Shonan Bellmare.

== Current squad ==
=== AMD U17 ===
| No. | Name |
Goalkeepers
| 1 | Aidan Azly |
| 21 | Muhammad al-Khair |
Defenders
| 9 | Kashif Nazarudin |
| 14 | Muhammad Zain Mizann |
| 23 | Muhammad Faizuddin |
| 24 | Syazuwanu Nizam |
| 27 | Faryshque Bin Azahar |
| 31 | Aqram Ali Adludin |
| 33 | Muhamad Naqhad Elmohrim |
| 34 | Khairan Shullah |
| 37 | Muhammad Awfiy Akram |
| 42 | Haqim Ahmran |
| 48 | Muhammad Ilhamin |
| 49 | Aishe Bashar |
Midfielders
| 11 | Muhammad Dion Bin Azli |
| 30 | Munafik Mazir |
| 32 | Muhammad Nurzat Makhzan |
| 39 | Aisya Moharom |
| 47 | Muhammad Fazlan |
| 78 | Ahmad Aquan Afzal |
Forwards
| 7 | Muhammad Azeem Hisab |
| 12 | Muhammad al-Hadidi |
| 15 | Tuan Hasyfierza Bin Tazmahal |

=== AMD U16 ===
| No. | Name |
Goalkeepers
| 22 | Muhammad Zoif Althidi |
| 25 | Muhammad Syafaat Ismail |
| 50 | Tazlim Bin Mushfiqan |
Defenders
| 3 | Muhammad Amiq Bin Haslam |
| 13 | Muhammad Syahmazid Bin Shahru Rizal |
| 16 | Shiakhu Rekhman Bin Madzilon |
| 18 | Takim Bin Mazlan |
| 20 | Mufaqqatolhuddu Bin Norisman |
| 29 | Rahim Bin Mazlan |
| 35 | Tengku Arwisang Bin Tengkolok |
| 38 | Muhammad Syazairi Bin Yusoof Naziri |
| 40 | Ikhwan Bin Fahri |
| 43 | Nourzery Bin Mamad Norizam |
Midfielders
| 2 | Muhammad Nurazeem Bin Madali |
| 4 | Muhammad Nahwan Bin Maidin |
| 5 | Muhammad Fahad Bin Zakhariyyeh |
| 6 | Muhammad Amzir Bin Amirin |
| 26 | Muhibzinal Abiden bin Naqol |
| 36 | Muhammad Isqandhar Bin Alhapiss |
Forwards
| 8 | Muammarjuallah Bin Syaifruzi |
| 10 | Mohamad Imishgillel Bin Mokrobani |
| 17 | Arfaaziq Bin Marzuki |
| 19 | Muhammad Alrafeef Bin Moman |
| 28 | Muhammad Azli Bin Nazif |
| 84 | Ahmad Yusrullah Bin Al Amaali |

== Coaching staff (2025) ==
| Position | Name |
|---|---|
| Team manager | (Malaysia) S. Veloo |
| U17 head coach | (Malaysia) Amarul Nazar Mohamed |
| U17 assistant coach | (Malaysia) Mustaffa Kamal Abd Wahab |
| U17 goalkeeping coach | (Malaysia) Ahmad Hasan Malek |
| U17 fitness coach | (Malaysia) Dinesh Baskaran |
| U17 Fitness coach | (Malaysia) Mohd Hidayat Amaruddin |
| U17 physio | (Malaysia) Muhammad Aizat Mohd Zabidi |
| U16 head coach | (Malaysia) Mohamad Kuizwan Mohd Johari |
| U16 assistant coach | (Malaysia) Amirizdwan Taj |
| U16 goalkeeping coach | (Malaysia) Farizal Harun |
| U16 fitness coach | (Malaysia) Hamizan Ahmad Habibullah |
| U16 fitness coach | (Malaysia) Mohd Hidayat Amaruddin |
| U16 physio | (Malaysia) Nabil Fikri Bin Kamaruddin |

== Honours ==
=== Domestic competitions ===
==== League ====
- Piala Belia
  - Runners-up (1): 2026
- Liga Remaja Kebangsaan U16
  - Champions (1): 2026
- Liga Remaja Kebangsaan U15
  - Champions (1): 2026

== See also ==
- Piala Presiden
- Piala Belia
- Malaysia Pahang Sports School
