= 2024 Liga Melaka =

Liga Melaka
- Season: 2024
- Champions: MBMB Warriors (Division 1); SAMB II (Division 2); Lekir F.C. (Division 3)
- Promoted: MBMB Warriors

Liga Melaka 2024 was the 92nd edition of the Liga Melaka, under the Melaka Football Association (MAFA). A total of 32 teams from 3 divisions competed in the Melaka League 2024 starting June 15.

== Locations ==
Melaka

== Melaka Charity Cup (Piala Sumbangsih Melaka)^{^{1}} ==
=== Details ===
6 July 2024
20:45 UTC+08:00

MBMB Warriors	2–1	Bertam Ulu
	Report

UTeM Stadium, Durian Tunggal

Match rules

- 90 minutes
- Penalty shoot-out if scores still level

Notes:

^1 2022 Division 1 Runner-up (MBMB Warriors) vs 2022 Division 2 Champion (Bertam Ulu)

== Division 1 ==
Division 1 A3 Community League
- Season: 2024
- Champions: MBMB Warriors
- Promoted: MBMB Warriors
- Relegated: Panglima; Tedong

=== Standings ===
Pos	Team	Pld	W	D	L	GF	GA	GD	Pts	Promotion, qualification or relegation
1	MBMB Warriors (C)	9	8	1	0	38	5	+33	25	Promotion to A2 Amateur League
2	Hulubalang	9	6	2	1	16	6	+10	20	
3	Perma	9	6	0	3	17	13	+4	18	
4	Andalas	9	6	0	3	16	13	+3	18	
5	Duyong Fighters F.C.	9	5	2	2	19	13	+6	17	Promotion to A2 Amateur League
6	PSP FC	9	4	1	4	16	16	0	13	
7	Bertam Ulu	9	4	0	5	12	13	−1	12	
8	Teman FM	9	2	0	7	11	20	−9	6	
9	Tedong	9	1	0	8	8	33	−25	3	Relegation to Division 2
10	Panglima	9	0	0	9	9	30	−21	0	Relegation to Division 2

Updated to match(es) played on 3 September 2024. Source: Melaka Football Association
Rules for classification: 1) Points; 2) Goal difference; 3) Number of goals scored.
(C) Champions

=== Fixtures and results ===
==== Matchweek 1 ====
7 July 2024	Andalas	1–2	Duyong Fighters
16:45 UTC+8		Report

7 July 2024	Tedong	0–5	Teman FM	Bukit Beruang
16:45 UTC+8		Report		Stadium: MMU Football Field

7 July 2024	Panglima	1–2	PSP	Telok Mas
16:45 UTC+8		Report		Stadium: Henry Gurney School Football Field

7 July 2024	Hulubalang	1–0	Perma
16:45 UTC+8		Report

==== Matchweek 2 ====
13 July 2024	Panglima	0–2	Tedong	Klebang Besar
16:45 UTC+8		Report		Stadium: SMK Klebang Besar Football Field

13 July 2024	Duyong Fighters	0–1	Bertam Ulu	Telok Mas
16:45 UTC+8		Report		Stadium: Henry Gurney School Football Field

13 July 2024	Teman FM	0–3	Hulubalang	Bukit Beruang
16:45 UTC+8				Stadium: MMU Football Stadium

13 July 2024	MBMB Warrior	2–0	Perma	Durian Tunggal
16:45 UTC+8				Stadium: UTeM Football Field

13 July 2024	PSP	1–2	Andalas
16:45 UTC+8

==== Matchweek 3 ====
20 July 2024	Teman FM	1–3	Andalas	Cheng
16:45 UTC+8		Report		Stadium: SMK Malim Football Field

20 July 2024	MBMB Warriors	5–1	PSP FC	Bukit Beruang
16:45 UTC+8		Report		Stadium: MMU Football Stadium

20 July 2024	Panglima	0–2	Bertam Ulu	Telok Mas
16:45 UTC+8		Report		Stadium: Henry Gurney School Football Field

20 July 2024	Duyong Fighters	3–2	Perma	Klebang Besar
16:45 UTC+8		Report		Stadium: SMK Klebang Besar Football Field

20 July 2024	Hulubalang	2–1	Tedong
16:45 UTC+8

==== Matchweek 4 ====
27 July 2024	Duyong Fighters	2–2	PSP FC	Bukit Beruang
16:45 UTC+8		Report		Stadium: MMU Football Stadium

27 July 2024	Tedong	1–3	Andalas	Klebang Besar
16:45 UTC+8		Report		Stadium: SMK Klebang Besar Football Field

28 July 2024	Panglima	0–2	Hulubalang	Telok Mas
16:45 UTC+8		Report		Stadium: Henry Gurney School Football Field

28 July 2024	Perma	2–1	Bertam Ulu	Bukit Beruang
16:45 UTC+8		Report		Stadium: MMU Football Stadium

==== Matchweek 5 ====
3 August 2024	Duyong Fighters	2–2	Hulubalang	Telok Mas
16:45 UTC+8		Report		Stadium: Henry Gurney School Football Field

3 August 2024	PSP FC	3–1	Tedong	Bukit Beruang
16:45 UTC+8		Report		Stadium: MMU Football Stadium

3 August 2024	Perma	4–3	Panglima	Klebang Besar
16:45 UTC+8		Report		Stadium: SMK Klebang Besar Football Field

3 August 2024	Teman FM	0–1	Bertam Ulu	Cheng
16:45 UTC+8		Report		Stadium: SMK Malim Football Field

4 August 2024	Andalas	0–3	MBMB Warriors	Klebang Besar
16:45 UTC+8		Report		Stadium: SMK Klebang Besar Football Field

==== Matchweek 6 ====
10 August 2024	Teman FM	0–1	Perma	Cheng
16:45 UTC+8		Report		Stadium: SMK Malim Football Field

11 August 2024	Panglima	1–7	MBMB Warriors	Semabok
16:45 UTC+8		Report		Stadium: Tun Fatimah Stadium

11 August 2024	Bertam Ulu	1–2	PSP FC	Bukit Beruang
16:45 UTC+8		Report		Stadium: MMU Football Stadium

11 August 2024	Tedong	0–2	Duyong Fighters	Telok Mas
16:45 UTC+8		Report		Stadium: Henry Gurney School Football Field

==== Matchweek 7 ====
17 August 2024	Hulubalang	1–1	MBMB Warriors	Klebang Besar
16:45 UTC+8		Report		Stadium: SMK Klebang Besar Football Field

17 August 2024	Tedong	1–4	Perma	Cheng
16:45 UTC+8		Report		Stadium: SMK Malim Football Field

18 August 2024	Bertam Ulu	1–2	Andalas	Klebang Besar
16:45 UTC+8		Report		Stadium: SMK Klebang Besar Football Field

18 August 2024	PSP FC	3–0	Teman FM	Bukit Beruang
16:45 UTC+8		Report		Stadium: MMU Football Stadium

18 August 2024	Panglima	1–4	Duyong Fighters	Telok Mas
16:45 UTC+8		Report		Stadium: Henry Gurney School Football Field

==== Matchweek 8 ====
24 August 2024	PSP FC	1–2	Hulubalang	Bukit Beruang
16:45 UTC+8		Report		Stadium: MMU Football Stadium

24 August 2024	Tedong	2–4	Bertam Ulu
16:45 UTC+8		Report

25 August 2024	Teman FM	4–1	Panglima	Telok Mas
16:45 UTC+8		Report		Stadium: Henry Gurney School Football Field

25 August 2024	MBMB Warriors	4–0	Duyong Fighters	Bukit Beruang
16:45 UTC+8		Report		Stadium: MMU Football Stadium

25 August 2024	Andalas	1–2	Perma
16:45 UTC+8		Report

==== Postpone match ====
28 August 2024	Teman FM	1–4	MBMB Warriors	Krubong
20:45 UTC+8		Report		Stadium: Hang Jebat Stadium

3 September 2024	Andalas	1–0	Hulubalang	Bukit Katil
20:00 UTC+8		Report		Stadium: Drago Arena

==== Matchweek 9 ====
31 August 2024	Bertam Ulu	0–3	Hulubalang	Bukit Beruang
16:45 UTC+8		Report		Stadium: MMU Football Stadium

31 August 2024	Panglima	2–3	Andalas	Cheng
16:45 UTC+8		Report		Stadium: SMK Malim Football Field

31 August 2024	Perma	2–1	PSP FC	Klebang Besar
16:45 UTC+8		Report		Stadium: SMK Klebang Besar Football Field

31 August 2024	MBMB Warriors	10–0	Tedong	Krubong
16:45 UTC+8		Report		Stadium: Hang Jebat Stadium

31 August 2024	Duyong Fighters	4–0	Teman FM	Telok Mas
16:45 UTC+8		Report		Stadium: Henry Gurney School Football Field

== Division 2 ==
Division 2
- Season: 2024
- Champions: SAMB FC II
- Promoted: SAMB FC II; Bara FC

=== Group stage ===
==== Group A ====
Pos	Team	Pld	W	D	L	GF	GA	GD	Pts	Promotion, qualification or relegation
1	SAMB FC II (C)	5	3	2	0	9	6	+3	11	Advance to Knock-out stage
2	MMU Melaka	5	3	1	1	11	6	+5	10	Advance to Knock-out stage
3	Peringgit Muafakat FC	5	2	3	0	13	6	+7	9	
4	Taba FC	5	1	2	2	2	4	−2	5	
5	Bachanglona FC	5	1	1	3	7	13	−6	4	Relegation to Division 3
6	Durian Tunggal FC	5	0	1	4	3	10	−7	1	Relegation to Division 3

Updated to match(es) played on 17 August 2024. Source: MAFA
Rules for classification: 1) Points; 2) Goal difference; 3) Number of goals scored.
(C) Champions

==== Group B ====
Pos	Team	Pld	W	D	L	GF	GA	GD	Pts	Promotion, qualification or relegation
1	Bara FC	5	4	0	1	13	6	+7	12	Advance to Knock-out stage
2	Durian Tunggal United	5	2	2	1	12	7	+5	8	Advance to Knock-out stage
3	Merlimau Pasir FC	5	2	2	1	7	6	+1	8	
4	Alai Empire FC	5	1	2	2	4	7	−3	5	
5	Arena FM FC	5	1	1	3	6	8	−2	4	Relegation to Division 3
6	Henry Gurney FC	5	1	1	3	7	15	−8	4	Relegation to Division 3

Updated to match(es) played on 17 August 2024. Source: MAFA
Rules for classification: 1) Points; 2) Goal difference; 3) Number of goals scored.

=== Knock-out stage ===
Semifinals
1(A)	SAMB FC II	2
2(B)	Durian Tunggal United	0
1(B)	Bara FC	1 (4)
2(A)	MMU Melaka	1 (2)

Final
SAMB FC II	1
Bara FC	0

==== Semi-finals ====
25 August 2024	SAMB FC II	2–0	Durian Tunggal United	Krubong
16:15 UTC+8		Report		Stadium: Padang 10, Wisma MAFA

25 August 2024	Bara FC	1–1 (a.e.t.) (4–2 p)	MMU Melaka	Krubong
16:15 UTC+8		Report		Stadium: Padang 10, Wisma MAFA

==== Final ====
8 September 2024	SAMB FC II	1–0	Bara FC	Durian Tunggal
20:45 UTC+8	Hanafiah Bakar	Report		Stadium: UTeM Stadium

== Division 3 ==
Division 3
- Season: 2024
- Champions: Lekir FC
- Promoted: Lekir FC; Taming Sari FC

=== Group stage ===
==== Group A ====
Pos	Team	Pld	W	D	L	GF	GA	GD	Pts	Promotion, qualification or relegation
1	Air Merbau FC	4	3	0	1	20	4	+16	9	Advance to Knock-out stage
2	Taming Sari FC	4	3	0	1	9	2	+7	9	Advance to Knock-out stage
3	Adiputra FC	4	2	0	2	16	5	+11	6	
4	Surya FC	4	2	0	2	14	4	+10	6	
5	MIFA	4	0	0	4	1	45	−44	0	

Updated to match(es) played on 18 August 2024. Source: Melaka Football Association
Rules for classification: 1) Points; 2) Goal difference; 3) Number of goals scored.

==== Group B ====
Pos	Team	Pld	W	D	L	GF	GA	GD	Pts	Promotion, qualification or relegation
1	Alor Gajah Police	4	3	1	0	10	2	+8	10	Advance to Knock-out stage
2	Lekir FC (C)	4	2	2	0	12	3	+9	8	Advance to Knock-out stage
3	Srikandi FC	4	2	1	1	8	4	+4	7	
4	TSR FC	4	1	0	3	4	11	−7	3	
5	MBFA	4	0	0	4	3	17	−14	0	

Updated to match(es) played on 18 August 2024. Source: Melaka Football Association
Rules for classification: 1) Points; 2) Goal difference; 3) Number of goals scored.
(C) Champions

=== Knock-out stage ===
Semifinals
1(A)	Air Merbau FC	1 (3)
2(B)	Lekir FC	1 (4)
1(B)	AG Perkasa	3 (2)
2(A)	Taming Sari FC	3 (4)

Final
Lekir FC
Taming Sari FC

==== Semi-finals ====
25 August 2024	Air Merbau FC	1–1 (a.e.t.) (3–4 p)	Lekir FC	Krubong
16:15 UTC+8		Report		Stadium: Padang 10, Wisma MAFA

25 August 2024	AG Perkasa	3–3 (a.e.t.) (2–4 p)	Taming Sari FC	Krubong
16:15 UTC+8		Report		Stadium: Padang 10, Wisma MAFA

==== Final ====
8 September 2024	Lekir FC	v	Taming Sari FC	Durian Tunggal
16:45 UTC+8				Stadium: UTeM Stadium
