= 2019 Liga Melaka =

The 2019 season was the 90th season of the Liga Melaka. It is a part of Malaysia M4 League. SAMB was the defending champion.

== Division 1 ==
Liga Melaka Division 1
- Season: 2019
- Champions: MBMB Warriors
- Relegated: Masjid Tanah; Teman FM

=== Group A ===
Pos	Team	Pld	W	D	L	GF	GA	GD	Pts	Qualification
1	MBMB Warriors (C, Q)	4	3	0	1	8	1	+7	9	Qualification to M3 League play-off
2	Perma	4	3	0	1	6	3	+3	9	
3	Pulau Sebang	4	1	2	1	2	3	−1	5	
4	Hulubalang	4	1	1	2	3	3	0	4	
5	Masjid Tanah (R)	4	0	1	3	1	10	−9	1	Religation to Division 2

Source: Liga Melaka
Rules for classification: 1) Points; 2) Goal difference; 3) Number of goals scored.
(C) Champions; (Q) Qualified for the phase indicated; (R) Relegated

=== Group B ===
Pos	Team	Pld	W	D	L	GF	GA	GD	Pts	Qualification
1	Andalas	5	5	0	0	14	2	+12	15	Knockout Stage
2	SAMB II	5	4	0	1	12	6	+6	12	Knockout Stage
3	Tampoi	5	2	1	2	8	8	0	7	
4	Pengkalan	5	2	1	2	8	11	−3	7	
5	Gerakan	5	1	0	4	7	12	−5	3	
6	Teman FM (R)	5	0	0	5	5	14	−9	0	Religation to Division 2

Source: Liga Melaka
Rules for classification: 1) Points; 2) Goal difference; 3) Number of goals scored.
(R) Relegated

=== Knock-out stage ===
==== Bracket ====
Semi-finals
A1	MBMB Warriors	1 (4)
B2	SAMB II	1 (2)
B1	Andalas	2
A2	Perma	0

Final
MBMB Warriors	2
Andalas	1

==== Semi-finals ====
1 September 2019	MBMB Warriors	1 – 1 (4 – 2 p)	SAMB II	Melaka City, Melaka
16:15 UTC+8				Stadium: Hang Tuah Stadium

1 September 2019	Andalas	2 – 0	Perma	Melaka City, Melaka
16:15 UTC+8				Stadium: Padang 2, Wisma MUSA

==== Final ====
14 September 2019	MBMB Warriors	2–1	Andalas	Melaka City, Melaka
20:45 UTC+8				Stadium: Hang Tuah Stadium

== Division 2 ==
Liga Melaka Division 2
- Season: 2019
- Champions: White Star
- Promoted: White Star; Persibu
- Relegated: Bara

=== Group A ===
Pos	Team	Pld	W	D	L	GF	GA	GD	Pts	Qualification
1	Arena FM	4	2	2	0	8	6	+2	8	Knockout stage
2	Jebat	4	2	1	1	4	2	+2	7	Knockout stage
3	MMU II	4	1	2	1	6	6	0	5	Knockout stage
4	Seri Mayor	4	1	2	1	4	5	−1	5	Knockout stage
5	Bara (R)	4	0	1	3	3	6	−3	1	Relegation to Division 3

Updated to match(es) played on unknown. Source: Facebook MUSA
Rules for classification: 1) Points; 2) Goal difference; 3) Number of goals scored.
(R) Relegated

=== Group B ===
Pos	Team	Pld	W	D	L	GF	GA	GD	Pts	Qualification
1	UTeM	3	2	1	0	7	3	+4	7	Knockout stage
2	Persibu (P)	3	2	1	0	6	4	+2	7	Knockout stage
3	Panglima	3	0	1	2	5	7	−2	1	Knockout stage
4	White Star (C, P)	3	0	1	2	4	8	−4	1	Knockout stage

Updated to match(es) played on unknown. Source: Facebook MUSA
Rules for classification: 1) Points; 2) Goal difference; 3) Number of goals scored.
(C) Champions; (P) Promoted

=== Bracket ===
Quarter-finals
A1	Arena FM	0
B4	White Star	1
A2	Jebat	1
B3	Panglima	0
B1	UTeM	3
A4	Seri Mayor	0
B2	Persibu	1 (4)
A3	MMU II	1 (3)

Semi-finals
B4	White Star	2
A2	Jebat	1
B1	UTeM	1
B2	Persibu	3

Final
White Star	1
Persibu	0

=== Quarter-finals ===
24 August 2019	Arena FM	0−1	White Star	Melaka City, Melaka
16:15 UTC+8				Stadium: Padang 1, Wisma MUSA

24 August 2019	Jebat	1−0	Panglima	Melaka City, Melaka
16:15 UTC+8				Stadium: Padang 2, Wisma MUSA

24 August 2019	Persibu	1−1 (4–2 p)	MMU II	Melaka City, Melaka
16:15 UTC+8				Stadium: Padang 3, Wisma MUSA

24 August 2019	UTeM	3−0	Seri Mayor	Melaka City, Melaka
16:15 UTC+8				Stadium: Padang 4, Wisma MUSA

=== Semi-finals ===
31 August 2019	White Star	2–1	Jebat	Melaka City, Melaka
16:15 UTC+8				Stadium: Padang A, Universiti Teknikal Malaysia

31 August 2019	UTeM	1–3	Persibu	Melaka City, Melaka
16:15 UTC+8				Stadium: UTeM Stadium

=== Final ===
8 September 2019	White Star	1–0	Persibu	Melaka City, Melaka
20:45 UTC+8				Stadium: Hang Tuah Stadium

== Division 3 ==
Liga Melaka Division 3
- Season: 2019
- Champions: Bertam Ulu
- Promoted: Bertam Ulu; Peringgit Bersatu

=== Group A ===
Pos	Team	Pld	W	D	L	GF	GA	GD	Pts	Qualification
1	Duyong Fighters	5	4	1	0	18	4	+14	13	Knockout Stage
2	ASA-GP	5	3	0	2	9	3	+6	9	Knockout Stage
3	Melayu Melaka	5	3	0	2	10	12	−2	9	
4	Kiddo Kickers	5	2	1	2	5	7	−2	7	
5	Didad	5	2	0	3	7	7	0	6	
6	Tajam	5	0	0	5	5	21	−16	0	

Updated to match(es) played on unknown. Source: Liga Melaka
Rules for classification: 1) Points; 2) Goal difference; 3) Number of goals scored.

=== Group B ===
Pos	Team	Pld	W	D	L	GF	GA	GD	Pts	Qualification
1	Sinar FC	4	3	1	0	12	3	+9	10	Knockout stage
2	PSP FC	4	3	0	1	7	2	+5	9	Knockout stage
3	Bukit Pegoh FC	4	1	2	1	8	9	−1	5	
4	Taming Sari FC	4	0	2	2	4	6	−2	2	
5	Selat FC	4	0	1	3	1	12	−11	1	

Updated to match(es) played on unknown. Source: Liga Melaka
Rules for classification: 1) Points; 2) Goal difference; 3) Number of goals scored.

=== Group C ===
Pos	Team	Pld	W	D	L	GF	GA	GD	Pts	Qualification
1	Bertam Ulu FC (C, P)	4	3	1	0	15	1	+14	10	Knockout stage
2	Peringgit Bersatu FC (P)	4	2	2	0	5	3	+2	8	Knockout stage
3	Kata FC	4	2	1	1	7	3	+4	7	
4	MCRC FC	4	1	0	3	4	13	−9	3	
5	Sang Helang FC	4	0	0	4	3	14	−11	0	

Updated to match(es) played on unknown. Source: Liga Melaka
Rules for classification: 1) Points; 2) Goal difference; 3) Number of goals scored.
(C) Champions; (P) Promoted

=== Group D ===
Pos	Team	Pld	W	D	L	GF	GA	GD	Pts	Qualification
1	Durian Tunggal FC	5	3	2	0	8	3	+5	11	Knockout stage
2	Tedong FC	5	3	2	0	7	2	+5	11	Knockout stage
3	Pekat FC	5	3	1	1	9	4	+5	10	
4	Taba FC	5	2	0	3	5	4	+1	6	
5	Saujana Indah FC	5	1	1	3	4	7	−3	4	
6	Alai FC	5	0	0	5	2	17	−15	0	

Updated to match(es) played on unknown. Source: Liga Melaka
Rules for classification: 1) Points; 2) Goal difference; 3) Number of goals scored.

=== Bracket ===
Quarter-finals
A1	Duyong Fighters FC	0 (2)
C2	Peringgit Bersatu FC	0 (3)
B1	Sinar FC	2 (2)
D2	Tedong FC	2 (3)
C1	Bertam Ulu FC	0 (4)
A2	ASA-GP FC	0 (3)
D1	Durian Tunggal FC	2
B2	PSP FC	1

Semi -finals
Peringgit Bersatu FC	2
Tedong FC	1
Bertam Ulu FC	2
Durian Tunggal FC	0

Final
Peringgit Bersatu FC	2
Bertam Ulu FC	3

=== Quarter-finals ===
1 May 2019	Duyong Fighters	0−0 (2–3 p)	Peringgit Bersatu	Melaka City, Melaka
16:00 UTC+8

1 May 2019	Sinar	2−2 (2–3 p)	Tedong	Melaka City, Melaka
16:00 UTC+8

1 May 2019	Bertam Ulu	0−0 (4–3 p)	ASA-GP	Melaka City, Melaka
16:00 UTC+8

1 May 2019	Durian Tunggal	2−1	Pangsapuri Sungai Putat	Melaka City, Melaka
16:00 UTC+8				Stadium: Padang 4

=== Semi-finals ===
5 May 2019	Peringgit Bersatu FC	2–1	Tedong FC	Padang 1, Kompleks Sukan Hang Jebat
16:00 UTC+8

5 May 2019	Bertam Ulu FC	2–0	Durian Tunggal FC	Padang 2, Kompleks Sukan Hang Jebat
16:00 UTC+8

=== Final ===
12 May 2019	Peringgit Bersatu FC	2–3	Bertam Ulu FC	Hang Tuah Stadium
20:30 UTC+8
