= Tampoi F.C. =

Malaysian football club

Tampoi
- Full name: Tampoi Football Club (Kelab Bolasepak Tampoi)
- Nickname: Hebat Merembat (The Great Shooting)
- Short name: TFC
- Founded: 2010; 16 years ago
- Head coach: Sapian Wahid
- League: Malaysia A3 Community League

Tampoi Football Club, commonly known as Tampoi FC, is a Malaysian football club based in Kampung Tampoi, Krubong, Melaka that cometes in the Melaka football league system. The club has gained recognition for its performances in local tournaments, including Liga Melaka Division 1 and the Melaka Governor Cup.

== History ==
Founded in 2010, Tampoi FC emerged as a competitive side within the Melaka amateur football scene in the early 2020s. Despite its name being associated with Tampoi, Johor, the club has primarily participated in competitions organized in Melaka. The club achieved a significant milestone in 2022 when it won the Liga Melaka Division 1 title. In the final, Tampoi FC defeated MBMB Warriors F.C. by 2–1, securing promotion and establishing itself as one of the top amateur teams in the state.

In the same year, Tampoi FC reached the final of the Melaka Governor Cup (Piala Gabenor Melaka), but finished as runners-up after losing to MBMB Warriors FC. Tampoi FC has joined the 2025–26 Negeri Sembilan Premier League.

== Players ==
=== Current squad ===
As of April 2026

Note: Flags indicate national team as defined under FIFA eligibility rules; some limited exceptions apply. Players may hold more than one non-FIFA nationality.

No.	Pos.	Nation	Player
1	GK	MAS	Irfan Zakwan Mohd Fairol
2	DF	MAS	Azfar Sallehuddin
3	MF	MAS	Afiq Syahmi Hilmunizam
4	DF	MAS	Ikhmal Roslan
5	DF	MAS	Shahrul Adhha Azhar
6	DF	MAS	Azizan Ab Khalid
7	FW	MAS	Hazif Satria
8	MF	MAS	Nazirul Ahmad Nazaruddin (captain)
9	FW	MAS	Shamerul Abd Aziz
10	FW	MAS	Zahir Syakil Zamani
11	MF	MAS	Shafiaizat Sapari
12	DF	MAS	Wan Aiman Adham
14	DF	MAS	Zaki Che Lah
16	MF	MAS	Afizzul Mohd Azani
17	FW	MAS	Ahmad Musawwir Hasif

No.	Pos.	Nation	Player
18	DF	MAS	Wan Zulfahmi Zamberi
20	DF	MAS	Alhapis Alwi
21	MF	MAS	Ag Ku Hairullizam
22	MF	MAS	Hazim Razali
23	MF	MAS	Zulkarnain Solong
24	MF	MAS	Haziq Shah Putra
25	DF	MAS	Fitri Azhar
26	DF	MAS	Khairul Nizam Arshad
27	DF	MAS	Nazim Haiqal Hapizi
28	MF	MAS	Khairuddin Abdul Shukor
30	MF	MAS	Arif Hafiz Mohd Farid
32	FW	MAS	Wan Nur Fazli
42	MF	MAS	Ezra Azerin Hamdan
55	GK	MAS	Ezrie Haikal Azri
58	GK	MAS	Muhd Jumadi Baderuddin

== Management ==
As of April 2026

Position	Name
Team manager	(Malaysia) Ramlan Meon
Head coach	(Malaysia) Sapian Wahid
Assistant coach	(Malaysia) Mohd Hafiz Abdul Karim
Goalkeeper coach	(Malaysia) Firdaus Rahim
Physio	(Malaysia) Mohd Ezyan Abdullah
Team assistant	(Malaysia) Muhammad Tarmizi Abdul Aziz
Coordinating officer	(Malaysia) Zamre Tahir

== Season by season record ==
Season	Division	Position	Malaysia Cup	Malaysian FA Cup	Malaysian Charity Shield	Melaka Governor Cup	Top scorer (all competitions)
2018	Liga Melaka Division 1	4th place	DNQ	DNQ	–	–	
2019	Liga Melaka Division 1	3rd place (Group B)	DNQ	DNQ	–	–	
2022	Liga Melaka Division 1	Champions	DNQ	DNQ	–	–	
2025–26	Negeri Sembilan Premier League	5th place (Group B)	DNQ	DNQ	–	Champions	(Malaysia) Ag Ku M. Khairullizam (2)

== Honours ==
=== League ===
- Division 4/Melaka League Division 1

- Winners (1): 2022

=== Cups ===
- Melaka Governor Cup

- Winners (1): 2023,2025
- Runners-up (1): 2024

== See also ==
- Football in Malaysia
- Liga Melaka
- Melaka Football Association
