= List of football stadiums in Malaysia =

The following is a list of football stadiums in Malaysia, ranked in descending order of capacity.

- There are over 500 football stadiums (main/mini/sports complex) and pitches in Malaysia so this list is not comprehensive.
- The list below consists of the stadiums where FIFA or FAM authorized football matches are allowed.
- The 12,000-capacity Malaysia National Hockey Stadium is the largest Malaysian stadium which is not used for football.

Currently, most major and significant stadiums in Malaysia with a capacity of 1,000 or more were included as some of the stadium has been under utilized and not well maintained as others stadium due to lack of major clubs adopt as home ground.

== Current stadiums ==
#	Image	Stadium	Capacity	City	State	Home team(s)	Opened
1		Bukit Jalil National Stadium	87,411	Kuala Lumpur	(Federal Territories of Malaysia) Federal Territories: "Government's State"; Kuala Lumpur	Malaysia National Football Team: "Malayan Tigers"; "Yellow Tigers"	1998
2		Old Shah Alam Stadium, Shah Alam Sport Complex (Demolished)	80,372 /40,000	Shah Alam	Selangor: "Darul Ehsan"	Selangor FC: (1994-2016)	16 July 1994
2		Old Shah Alam Stadium, Shah Alam Sport Complex (Demolished)	80,372 /40,000	Shah Alam	Selangor: "Darul Ehsan"	PKNS FC (before merging) Selangor FC U-23 (current): (2017-2018)	16 July 1994
2		Old Shah Alam Stadium, Shah Alam Sport Complex (Demolished)	80,372 /40,000	Shah Alam	Selangor: "Darul Ehsan"	Selangor FC: (2019-2020)	16 July 1994
2		Petaling Jaya Stadium	25,000	Petaling Jaya	Selangor: "Darul Ehsan"	Selangor FC: "The Red Giant"; "The White Eagle"	1996
2	TBA	New Shah Alam Stadium, Shah Alam Sport Complex.	35,000: 45,000	Shah Alam	Selangor: "Darul Ehsan"	Selangor FC: "The Red Giant"; "The White Eagle"	Shah Alam
3		Sultan Mizan Zainal Abidin Stadium	50,000	Kuala Terengganu	Terengganu: "Darul Iman"	Terengganu FC: "East Coast SeaTurtles"; "New Era El Classico"	2008
4		The Sarawak Stadium	45,000	Kuching	Sarawak: "Bumi Kenyalang"; "Darul Hana"	Sarawak United FC: "Bumi Kenyalang"	1997
4		The Sarawak Stadium	45,000	Kuching	Sarawak: "Bumi Kenyalang"; "Darul Hana"	Kuching City FC: "City of Unity"	1997
5		Tuanku Abdul Rahman Stadium	45,000	Seremban	Negeri Sembilan: "Darul Khusus"	Negeri Sembilan FC: "Minang Kerbau"; "Yellow Deers"	1992
5		Tuanku Abdul Rahman Stadium	45,000	Seremban	Negeri Sembilan: "Darul Khusus"	KSR SAINS FC: (dissolved)	1992
6		Perak Stadium	42,500	Ipoh	Perak: "Darul Ridzuan"	Perak FC: "Northern Tigers"; "The Bos Gaurus"	1965
7		Sultan Ibrahim Stadium	40,000	Iskandar Puteri	Johor: "Darul Ta'zim"	Johor Darul Ta'zim FC: "Southern Tigers"; "The Strait Boys"	2020
8		Hang Jebat Stadium	40,000	Krubong	Malacca: "Bandaraya Bersejarah"; "Darul Azim"	Melaka: "Malayan MouseDeers"; "The Malacca Trees"	2004
9		Penang State Stadium	40,000	Batu Kawan	Penang: "Pulau Mutiara"; "Darul Ulum"	Penang FC: "Black Panthers"	2000
10		Darul Makmur Stadium	40,000	Kuantan	Pahang: "Darul Makmur"	Sri Pahang FC: "Tok Gajah Elephants"; "The Durians"	1973
11		Likas Stadium	35,000	Kota Kinabalu	Sabah: "Negeri Dibawah Bayu"; "Darul Saadah"	Sabah FC: "Northern Borneo Rhinos"	1983
12		Sultan Mohammad IV Stadium	30,000 (reduced after renovation)	Kota Bharu	Kelantan: "Darul Naim"	Kelantan FC (formerly)	1967
12		Sultan Mohammad IV Stadium	30,000 (reduced after renovation)	Kota Bharu	Kelantan: "Darul Naim"	Kelantan Darul Naim FC: "EastCoast Muntjacs"; "Che Siti Wan Kembang"	1967
13		Darul Aman Stadium	32,387	Alor Star	Kedah: "Darul Aman"	Kedah Darul Aman FC: "The Red Eagles"; "Jelapang Padi"	1962
14		Tan Sri Dato Haji Hassan Yunos Stadium	30,000	Johor Bahru	Johor: "Darul Ta'zim"	Johor Darul Ta'zim II FC	1964
15		Sarawak State Stadium	26,000	Kuching	Sarawak: "Bumi Kenyalang"; "Darul Hana"	Sarawak United FC: "Bumi Kenyalang"	1991
15		Sarawak State Stadium	26,000	Kuching	Sarawak: "Bumi Kenyalang"; "Darul Hana"	Kuching City FC: "City of Unity"	1991
16		Merdeka Independence Stadium	25,000	Kuala Lumpur	(Federal Territories of Malaysia) Federal Territories: "Government's State"; Kuala Lumpur	Malaysia national football team: (1957–1998)	1957
16		Merdeka Independence Stadium	25,000	Kuala Lumpur	(Federal Territories of Malaysia) Federal Territories: "Government's State"; Kuala Lumpur	Selangor FC: (1957–1994)	1957
17		Petaling Jaya Stadium	25,000	Petaling Jaya	Selangor: "Darul Ehsan"	PKNS FC: Selangor FC U-23 (Current)	1996
17		Petaling Jaya Stadium	25,000	Petaling Jaya	Selangor: "Darul Ehsan"	Petaling Jaya City FC: (dissolved)	1996
17		Petaling Jaya Stadium	25,000	Petaling Jaya	Selangor: "Darul Ehsan"	Selangor FC: (currently)	1996
18		Tun Abdul Razak Stadium	35,000	Bandar Pusat Jengka	Pahang: "Darul Makmur"	Felda United FC (formerly): "Government's Federal Lands"	2015
19	Sultan Ismail Nasiruddin Shah Stadium, Terengganu.	Sultan Ismail Nasiruddin Shah Stadium	15,000	Kuala Terengganu	Terengganu	Terengganu FC II	1967
20		Tuanku Syed Putra Stadium	20,000	Kangar	Perlis: "Indera Kayangan"	Perlis GSA	1995
20		Tuanku Syed Putra Stadium	20,000	Kangar	Perlis: "Indera Kayangan"	Bintong FC	1995
21		Penang City Stadium	20,000	Georgetown	Penang	Penang FC	1948
22	Kuala Lumpur Stadium, Cheras.	Kuala Lumpur Stadium	18,000	Kuala Lumpur	(Federal Territories of Malaysia) Federal Territories: "Government's State"; Kuala Lumpur	Kuala Lumpur City FC: "Cities Tigers"; "Southern KualaLumpur"	1995
23		Selayang Stadium	16,000	Selayang	Selangor: "Darul Ehsan"; (Federal Territories of Malaysia) Federal Territories: "Government's State"; Kuala Lumpur		1999
23		Selayang Stadium	16,000	Selayang	Selangor: "Darul Ehsan"; (Federal Territories of Malaysia) Federal Territories: "Government's State"; Kuala Lumpur	PDRM FC: "BlueCops Tigers"; "Northern KualaLumpur"	1999
24		Pasir Gudang Corporation Stadium	15,000	Pasir Gudang	Johor	Johor Darul Ta'zim III FC	2013
25		Hang Tuah Stadium	15,000 (formerly)	Malacca City	Malacca	SAMB F.C. / MBMB Warriors / Machan	1954
26		Tawau Sport Complex Stadium	15,000	Tawau	Sabah	Vacated	2007
27		Manjung Municipal Council Stadium	15,000	Manjung	Perak	Perak	2018
27	Manjung City FC: "The Pangkor Hornbills"; "The Manjung Strait Boys"	Manjung Municipal Council Stadium	15,000	Manjung	Perak	Malaysia A1 Semi-Pro League	2018
28		Naval Base Lumut Stadium	12,000	Lumut	Perak	Armed Forces FC: "Malayan Tigers Army"; "The Warriors"	1980
29		Keningau Sport Complex Mini Stadium	10,000	Keningau	Sabah	Kadasan Dusun Murut Malaysia FC	1980
30		UiTM Stadium	10,000	Shah Alam	Selangor: "Darul Ehsan"	UiTM United FC: "Malayan Wise Lions"	
31		Temerloh Stadium	10,000	Temerloh	Pahang: "Darul Makmur"	D'AR Wanderers FC	
32		Kuala Selangor Main Stadium	10,000	Kuala Selangor	Selangor: "Darul Ehsan"	Harini: "Malayan Kingfishers"	
33		Langkawi Stadium	10,000	Langkawi	Kedah		
34		Mindef Stadium	5,000	Kampung Datuk Keramat	Kuala Lumpur	Armed Forces	
35		Azman Hashim Stadium	5,000	Skudai	Johor		
36		Pendang Mini Stadium	3,700	Pendang	Kedah		
37		Jalan Raja Muda Abdul Aziz Stadium	3,500	Kampung Baru, Kuala Lumpur	(Federal Territories of Malaysia) Federal Territories: "Government's State"; Kuala Lumpur	Kampong Ku	
38		Sultan Ibrahim Mini Stadium	3,000	Muar	Johor		
39		Petronas Bangi Mini Stadium	3,000	Bangi	Selangor: "Darul Ehsan"		
40		Kulai Mini Stadium	3,000	Kulai	Johor		
41		Tun Fatimah Stadium	3,000	Semabok	Malacca		
42		Tampin Stadium	3,000	Tampin	Negeri Sembilan		
43		USIM Stadium	3,000	Nilai	Negeri Sembilan	Malaysian University	
44		Jugra Stadium	3,000	Banting	Selangor: "Darul Ehsan"		
45		Proton City Stadium	3,000	Tanjung Malim	Perak	DRB-Hicom	
46		Sultan Yusuf Stadium	3,000	Taiping	Perak		
47		Sultan Sulaiman Stadium	3,000	Klang	Selangor: "Darul Ehsan"		
48		TUDM Stadium	3,000	Subang	Selangor: "Darul Ehsan"		
49		JKR Stadium	3,000	Shah Alam	Selangor: "Darul Ehsan"		
50		MPKJ Stadium	3,000	Bangi	Selangor: "Darul Ehsan"		
51		UPM Stadium	3,000	Serdang	Selangor: "Darul Ehsan"	Immigration II	
52		MMU Stadium	2,500	Cyberjaya	Selangor: "Darul Ehsan"	Seoul Phoenix	
53		Panasonic Stadium	2,000	Shah Alam	Selangor: "Darul Ehsan"		
54		Maybank Stadium	2,000	Bangi	Selangor: "Darul Ehsan"		
55		USM Stadium	2,000	Gelugor	Penang		
56		Sultan Abdul Halim Stadium	2,000	Sungai Petani	Kedah		
57		Bakri Rais Stadium	2,000	Bota Kanan	Perak		
58		Padang Merdeka Port Dickson	1,500	Port Dickson	Negeri Sembilan	MPPD	
59		UM Arena Stadium	1,000	Kuala Lumpur	(Federal Territories of Malaysia) Federal Territories: "Government's State"; Kuala Lumpur	IKRAM Muda	
59		UM Arena Stadium	1,000	Kuala Lumpur	(Federal Territories of Malaysia) Federal Territories: "Government's State"; Kuala Lumpur	UM - Damansara United	
60		Kuala Berang Mini Stadium	1,000	Kuala Berang	Terengganu	Kuala Terengganu Rovers	
61		UKM Bangi Stadium	1,000	Bangi	Selangor: "Darul Ehsan"	UKM FC	
62		Kajang Prison Complex Stadium	1,000	Kajang	Selangor: "Darul Ehsan"	Penjara	
63		INSPEN Institute Pernilaian Negara Stadium	1,000	Bangi	Selangor: "Darul Ehsan"		
64		MPSJ Stadium	1,000	Subang Jaya	Selangor: "Darul Ehsan"		
65		Kompleks Rakan Muda Stadium	1,000	Alor Gajah	Malacca		
66		IRC Arena Stadium	1,000	Bandar Sri Sendayan	Negeri Sembilan	Bunga Raya	
67		Setiawangsa Stadium	1,000	Setiawangsa	Kuala Lumpur	Kuala Lumpur Rangers	
68		MAHSA University Mini Stadium	1,000	Gombak	Selangor	NBK Empire	
69		UIA Mini Stadium	1,000	Kuantan	Pahang	Yayasan Pahang Maintenance	
70		Pasir Mas Mini Stadium	1,000	Pasir Mas	Kelantan		

== Defunct stadiums ==
This is the list of stadiums that have been demolished.

- Stadium Kajang - The stadium has been redeveloped into a sports complex for multi-purpose sports activities. Its football pitch still exist for the used for community football match.

== Future stadiums ==
This is the list of stadiums under development for all-seater.

- New Shah Alam Stadium - The Selangor state government plans to rebuild the current Shah Alam Stadium as part of the redevelopment of the Shah Alam Sports Complex. Capacity 35,000 - 45,000
- AFC Stadium - Stadium build in Putrajaya funding by FIFA and AFC. Capacity 10,000

== See also ==
- List of Asian stadiums by capacity
- List of association football stadiums by capacity
