= 2018 Liga Melaka =

The 2018 season was the 89th season of the Liga Melaka. UtEM FC were the defending champions.

== Teams ==
51 team competed in the league. Top team from the Division 1 was promoted to the Malaysia M4 League for 2019 season.

== Division 1 ==
Liga Melaka Division 1
- Season: 2018
- Champions: SAMB
- Promoted: SAMB

Pos	Team	Pld	W	D	L	GF	GA	GD	Pts	Promotion, qualification or relegation
1	SAMB (C, P)	11	8	2	1	33	10	+23	26	Promotion to Malaysia M3 League
2	Masjid Tanah	12	8	2	2	27	13	+14	26	
3	Hulubalang	12	6	3	3	32	20	+12	21	
4	Tampoi	12	5	4	3	14	11	+3	19	
5	BSN	11	5	2	4	18	15	+3	17	
6	Pulau Sebang	12	5	1	6	25	32	−7	16	
7	Pengkalan	12	4	3	5	21	21	0	15	
8	Perma	12	4	3	5	26	32	−6	15	
9	Teman FM	12	4	1	7	20	25	−5	13	
10	Gerakan	11	4	1	6	16	22	−6	13	
11	Persibu	11	3	3	5	22	26	−4	12	
12	UTeM (R)	12	2	4	6	15	29	−14	10	Relegation to Division 2
13	Arena FM (R)	12	2	3	7	9	25	−16	9	Relegation to Division 2

Updated to match(es) played on 28 October 2018. Source: Liga Melaka
Rules for classification: 1) Points; 2) Goal difference; 3) Number of goals scored.
(C) Champions; (P) Promoted; (R) Relegated

== Division 2 ==
Liga Melaka Division 2
- Season: 2018
- Champions: MBMB Warriors
- Promoted: MBMB Warriors; Andalas

Pos	Team	Pld	W	D	L	GF	GA	GD	Pts	Promotion, qualification or relegation
1	MBMB Warriors (C, P)	10	8	2	0	31	1	+30	26	Promotion to Division 1
2	Andalas (P)	10	8	2	0	26	7	+19	26	Promotion to Division 1
3	Panglima	10	5	1	4	32	13	+19	16	
4	Gadong Perdana	10	4	3	3	16	11	+5	15	
5	Bara	10	4	3	3	17	16	+1	15	
6	White Star	10	4	1	5	18	15	+3	13	
7	HAT FM	10	3	2	5	12	18	−6	11	
8	Seri Mayor	10	3	2	5	11	18	−7	11	
9	Surya	10	3	2	5	18	34	−16	11	
10	ASA-GP	10	2	1	7	8	27	−19	7	Relegation to Division 3
11	Peringgit Bersatu	10	1	1	8	6	30	−24	4	Relegation to Division 3

Updated to match(es) played on 4 November 2018. Source: Liga Melaka
Rules for classification: 1) Points; 2) Goal difference; 3) Number of goals scored.
(C) Champions; (P) Promoted

== Division 3 ==
Liga Melaka Division 3
- Season: 2018
- Champions: Jebat
- Promoted: Jebat; MMU II

=== Group A ===
Pos	Team	Pld	W	D	L	GF	GA	GD	Pts	Qualification
1	Henry Gurney	6	5	0	1	29	6	+23	15	Knockout stage
2	Tedong	6	4	1	1	21	7	+14	13	Knockout stage
3	Sang Helang	5	3	0	2	7	9	−2	9	
4	Alai	6	2	2	2	16	13	+3	8	
5	Didad	6	1	1	4	11	15	−4	4	
6	Taba	5	1	1	3	8	25	−17	4	
7	MBFA	6	1	0	5	4	21	−17	3	

Updated to match(es) played on 3 September 2018. Source: Melaka
Rules for classification: 1) Points; 2) Goal difference; 3) Number of goals scored.

=== Group B ===
Pos	Team	Pld	W	D	L	GF	GA	GD	Pts	Qualification
1	Jebat (C, P)	5	5	0	0	22	2	+20	15	Knockout stage
2	Cboyo United	5	4	0	1	14	7	+7	12	Knockout stage
3	Emza Old Boys	5	3	0	2	15	9	+6	9	
4	Selandar	5	2	0	3	8	12	−4	6	
5	Merdeka Jaya	5	1	0	4	7	17	−10	3	
6	Merlimau Pasir	5	0	0	5	2	21	−19	0	

Updated to match(es) played on 26 August 2018. Source: Melaka
Rules for classification: 1) Points; 2) Goal difference; 3) Number of goals scored.
(C) Champions; (P) Promoted

=== Group C ===
Pos	Team	Pld	W	D	L	GF	GA	GD	Pts	Qualification
1	Taming Sari	5	4	0	1	12	8	+4	12	Knockout stage
2	Pekat	5	3	1	1	7	6	+1	10	Knockout stage
3	Bertam Perdana	5	3	0	2	12	6	+6	9	
4	Kiddo Kickers	5	2	1	2	6	3	+3	7	
5	Bukit Pegoh	5	1	1	3	11	12	−1	4	
6	Adi Putra	5	0	1	4	4	18	−14	1	

Updated to match(es) played on 11 August 2018. Source: Melaka
Rules for classification: 1) Points; 2) Goal difference; 3) Number of goals scored.

=== Group D ===
Pos	Team	Pld	W	D	L	GF	GA	GD	Pts	Qualification
1	MMU II (P)	6	6	0	0	21	3	+18	18	Knockout stage
2	Hatten	6	4	1	1	16	8	+8	13	Knockout stage
3	Pangsapuri Sungai Putat	6	3	2	1	7	3	+4	11	
4	Selat	6	3	0	3	15	17	−2	9	
5	Permata Satria	6	2	0	4	10	9	+1	6	
6	MS JKR	6	1	1	4	7	15	−8	4	
7	All Star United	6	0	0	6	2	23	−21	0	

Updated to match(es) played on 3 September 2018. Source: Melaka
Rules for classification: 1) Points; 2) Goal difference; 3) Number of goals scored.
(P) Promoted

=== Bracket ===
Quarter-finals
A1	Henry Gurney	3
C2	Pekat	2
B1	Jebat	3
D2	Hatten	0
C1	Taming Saring	1
A2	Tedong	2
D1	MMU	2
B2	Cboyo United	1

Semi-finals
Henry Gurney	3
Jebat	4
Tedong	0
MMU	3

Final
Jebat	1
MMU II	0

=== Quarter-finals ===
8 September 2018
16:00 UTC+8

Henry Gurney	3–2	Pekat

Padang 1
8 September 2018
16:00 UTC+8

Jebat	3–0	Hatten

Padang 2
8 September 2018
16:00 UTC+8

Taming Sari	1–2	Tedong

Padang 3
8 September 2018
16:00 UTC+8

MMU II	2–1	Cboyo United

Padang 4

=== Semi-finals ===
15 September 2018
16:15 UTC+8

Jebat	4–3	Henry Gurney

Padang 1
15 September 2018
16:15 UTC+8

Tedong	0–3	MMU II

Padang 2

=== Final ===
30 September 2018
20:30 UTC+8

MMU II	0−1	Jebat

Hang Tuah Stadium
