= Duyong Fighters F.C. =

Malaysian football club

Duyong Fighters
- Full name: Duyong Fighters Football Club
- Nickname: The Fighters
- Short name: DFFC
- Founded: 2018; 8 years ago
- Ground: UTeM Stadium; Tun Fatimah Stadium
- Capacity: 1,000
- Head coach: Mohd Noor Derus
- League: Malaysia A2 Amateur League
Home colours	Away colours

Duyong Fighters Football Club (Malay: Kelab Bolasepak Duyong Fighters) is a Malaysian football club based in Duyong, Melaka. The club currently plays in the Malaysia A2 Amateur League, the third tier of the Malaysian football league system.

== History ==
Founded in 2018, Duyong Fighters participated in the Liga Melaka competitions. In the 2022 Liga Melaka Division 2 they achieved a commendable runners-up position, narrowly losing 3–2 to Bertam Ulu FC in the final held at Hang Tuah Stadium. During the 2024–25 season, the club took part in the Melaka A3 Community League (Division 1), the regional qualifying competition in Malaysia's amateur league structure. While MBMB Warriors emerged as champions, Duyong Fighters were among those promoted to the national stage. For the 2025–26 Malaysia A2 Amateur League, Duyong Fighters have represented Melaka.

== Players ==
As of September 2025

Note: Flags indicate national team as defined under FIFA eligibility rules; some limited exceptions apply. Players may hold more than one non-FIFA nationality.

No.	Pos.	Nation	Player
3	MF	MAS	Akmal Ahmad Ruzaini
4	DF	MAS	Fareez Najmi (captain)
6	DF	MAS	Azim Rosnizam
7	FW	MAS	Faris Amsyar
8	MF	MAS	Afiq Syahmi
9	FW	MAS	Azeeq Danial
10	FW	MAS	Shamerul Abd Aziz
11	MF	MAS	Shameer Haruddin
14	DF	MAS	Adib Aiman
16	MF	MAS	Akmal Arif
17	MF	MAS	Afiq Norizan
18	DF	MAS	Fazwan Azam
19	GK	MAS	Zahrul Adzmi

No.	Pos.	Nation	Player
20	DF	MAS	Nazim Haiqal
22	MF	MAS	Azfarhan Azzlan
28	MF	MAS	Khairil Izwan Ruslan
33	GK	MAS	Aiman Irsyad
37	MF	MAS	Atif Hanif
42	DF	MAS	Najmie Ismail
43	DF	MAS	Firdaus Ya'akub (on loan from Melaka)
45	FW	MAS	Hakimy Mohd Khairol (on loan from Melaka)
49	MF	MAS	Haziq Alzam
50	DF	GHA	Lucky Amenyo
51	DF	MAS	Dehya Al-Qalbi
52	FW	GHA	Didier Lamptey
53	FW	TAN	Abednego Uzondu Silaz
77	MF	MAS	Anas Sa’aya
88	MF	MAS	Akmal Nor Jam Afandi
99	GK	MAS	Ezrie Haikal Azri

== Management ==
As of September 2025

Position	Name
Team manager	(Malaysia) Muhammad Syafiq Zainal Abidin
Assistant manager	(Malaysia) Suffien Mohd Sharif
Head coach	(Malaysia) Mohd Noor Derus
Assistant coach	(Malaysia) Mohd Firdaus Abu
Goalkeeper coach	(Malaysia) Syahrul Nizam Shamsuddin
Fitness coach	(Malaysia) Ezwan Abdullah Arif
Physio	(Malaysia) Haziq Akmal Hamdan
Team admin	(Malaysia) Mohd Zulfadili Hamzah
Team media	(Malaysia) Azwan Safuan Zulkifli
Kitman	(Malaysia) Muhammad Fadzil Bin Mohd Latif

== Season by season record ==
Season	Division	Position	Malaysia Cup	Malaysian FA Cup	Malaysian Charity Shield	Regional	Top scorer (all competitions)
2019	Liga Melaka (Division 3)	Quarter-finalist	DNQ	DNQ	DNQ	DNQ	
2020–21	Cancelled due to the COVID-19 pandemic						
2022	Liga Melaka (Division 2)	Runner-up	DNQ	DNQ	DNQ	DNQ	
2023	Not held						
2024	Liga A3 Melaka (Division 1)	5th of 10	DNQ	DNQ	DNQ	DNQ	
2025–26	Liga A2	3rd (South Zone)	DNQ	DNQ	DNQ	DNQ	(Malaysia) Shamerul Abd Aziz (9)

== Honours ==
=== Domestic ===
League

- Liga Melaka Division 2
  - Runners-up (1): 2022
- Liga Melaka Division 3
  - Quarter-finalist: 2019

== See also ==
- Football in Malaysia
