= Cuba–Malaysia relations =

- Cuba: Malaysia

Cuba–Malaysia relations refers to bilateral relations between Cuba and Malaysia. Diplomatic relations were established on 6 February 1975, Cuba opened its embassy in Kuala Lumpur on 1997, while Malaysia opened its representation in Havana in February 2001. Both are the members of Group of 77, Non-Aligned Movement and United Nations.

== Cultural exchange ==
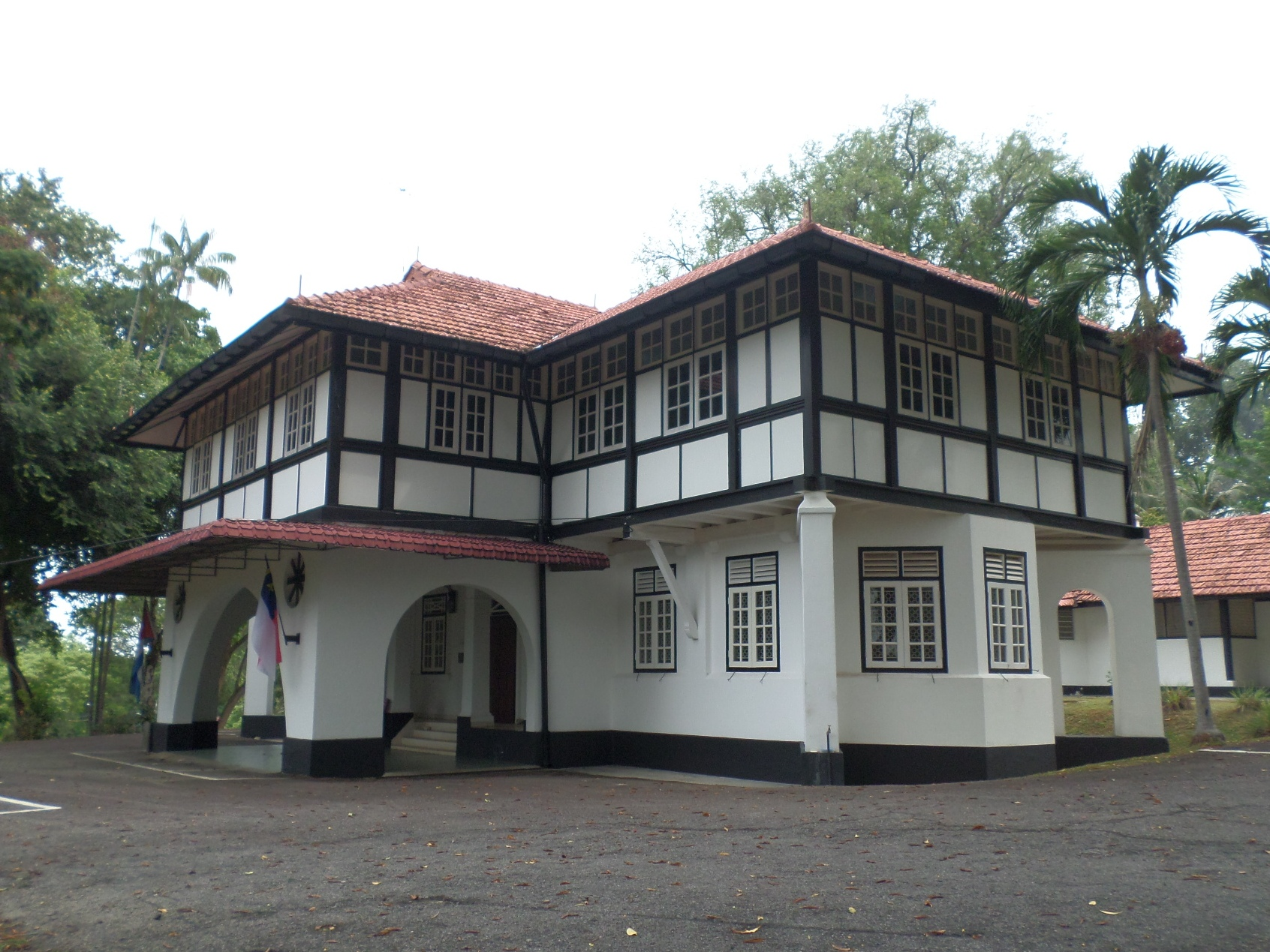
Casa Cuba in Malacca, Malaysia.

The Cuban Embassy in Malaysia used to operate an art gallery named Casa Cuba, in a bungalow in Peringgit, Malacca to promote the works of Cuban artists such as paintings, lithographs and ceramics.

== Economic relations ==
In 2001, Cuba was granted US$10m palm oil credit facility by Malaysia to purchase 35,000 tonnes of palm oil under the Palm Oil Credit and Payment Arrangement (POCPA) scheme. Both countries co-operate in the area of biotechnology in the field of research and production of vaccines. The Cuban government has provide a scholarships for Malaysian students to pursue their medical studies and humanities in Cuba. Until 2014, the relations are limited to biotechnology and culture, thus Cuba announced their interest to expand the relations more further towards other fields such as healthcare, tourism and education. In 2016, the Malaysian side also keen to expand their bilateral relations with the invitation of Cuban companies to participate in major trade shows organised by the country each year and ratified the position of their country against the economic blockade to the Caribbean nation. In 2018, Cuba extended their invitation to Malaysia to explore the possibility of producing Cuban vaccines in the country.
