= Macau Gallery Melaka =

Gallery in Melaka Tengah, Malacca, Malaysia

Coordinates: 2°13′16.9″N 102°15′20.0″E

- Galeri Macao Melaka 馬六甲澳門展館
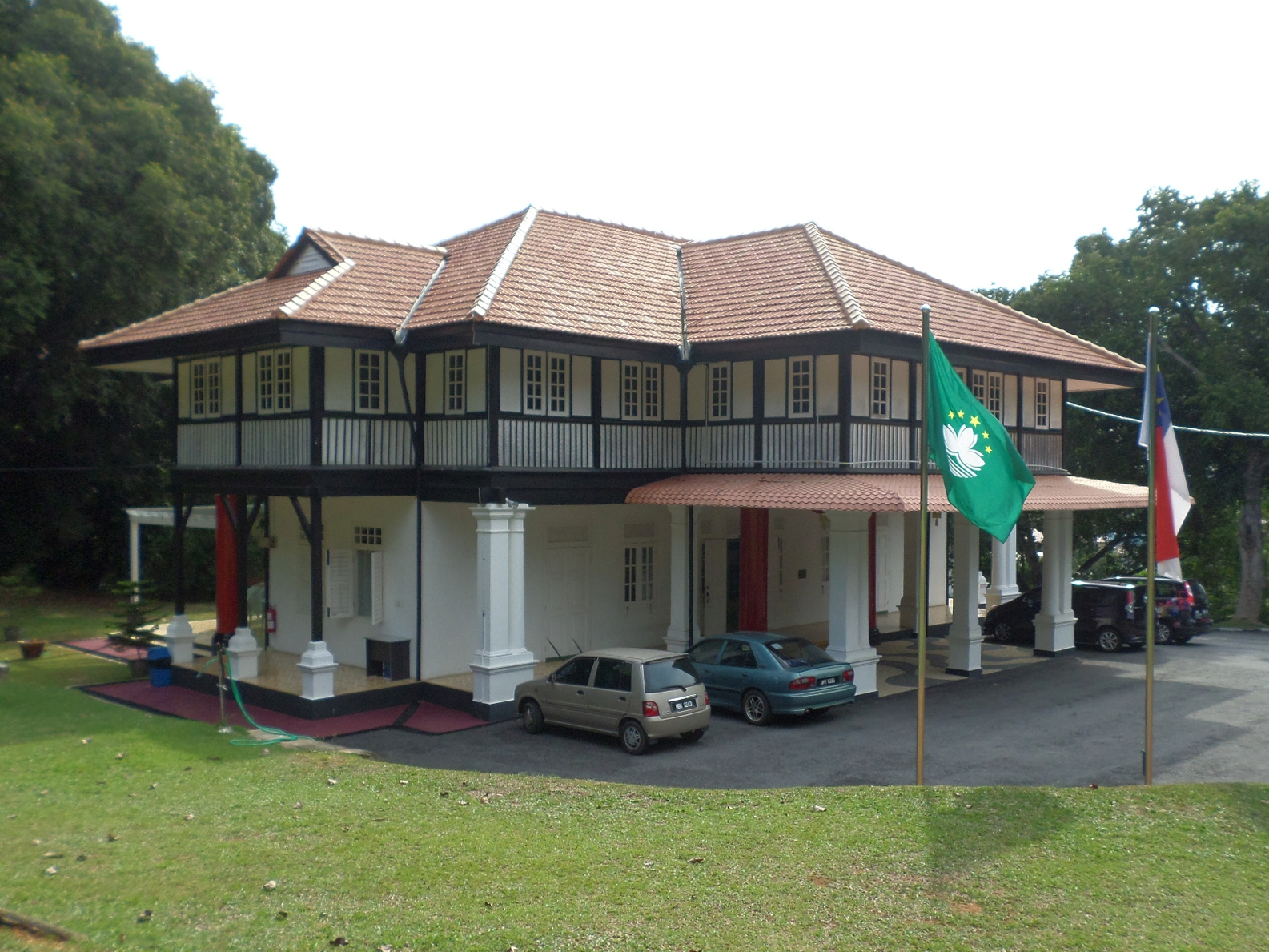
- Established: 26 June 2012
- Location: No. 6, Bukit Peringgit, Malacca, Malaysia
- Owner: Macao Government Tourist Office
- Website: www.macaugallery.com.my

Macau Gallery Melaka
- Traditional Chinese: 馬六甲澳門展館
- Simplified Chinese: 马六甲澳门展馆
- Jyutping: maa5 luk6 gaap3 ou3 mun4 zin2 gun2
Transcriptions
Standard Mandarin
- Hanyu Pinyin: Mǎliùjiǎ Àomén Zhǎnguǎn
Yue: Cantonese
- Jyutping: maa5 luk6 gaap3 ou3 mun4 zin2 gun2

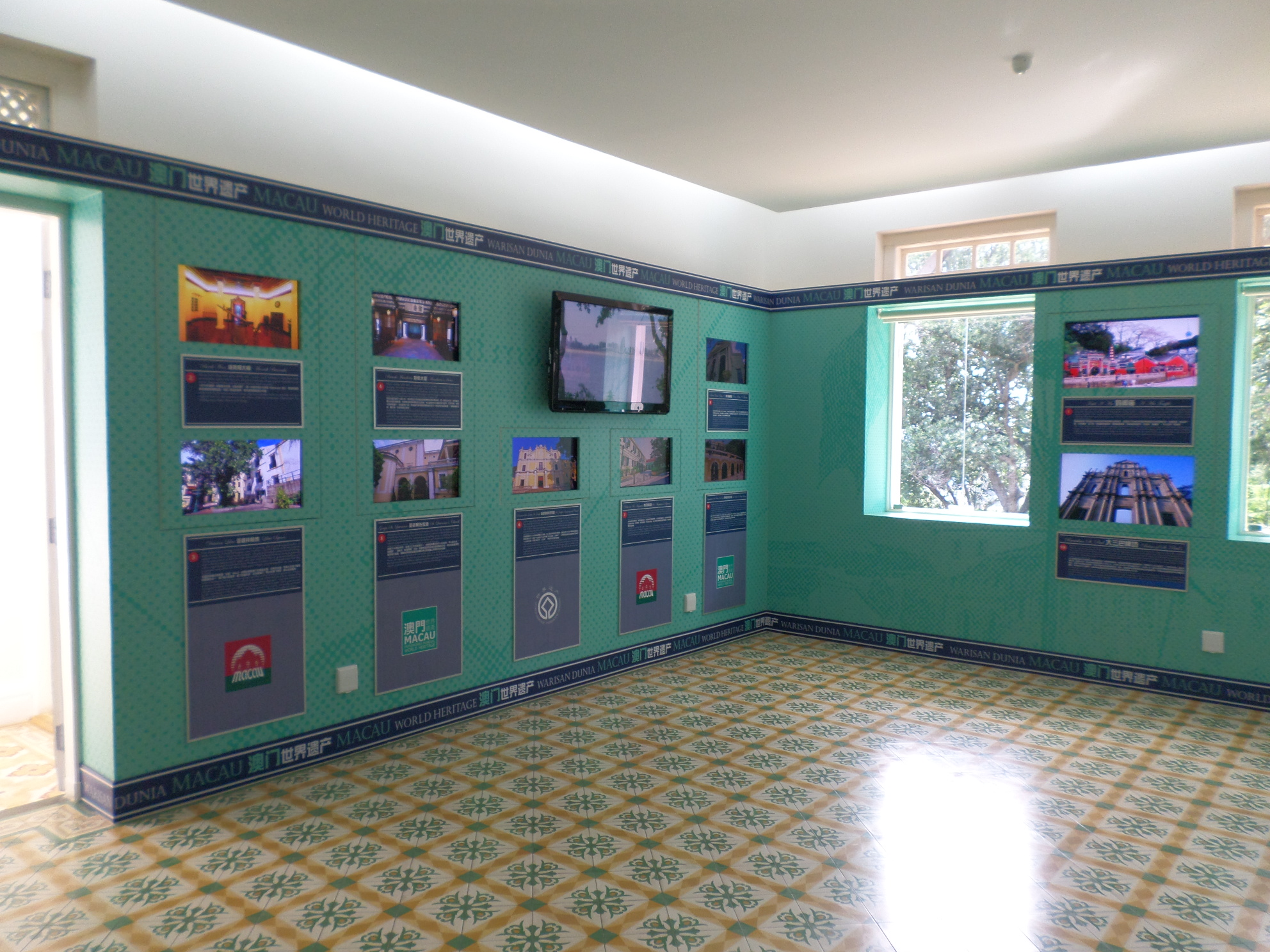
Macau Gallery Melaka exhibition hall

Macau Gallery Melaka (Note: Gallery uses the Malay language spelling of the state's name, as opposed to the more traditional English language spelling of its name, "Malacca") (Malay: Galeri Macau Melaka; Chinese: 馬六甲澳門展館) was a gallery set up by the Government of Malacca in collaboration with the Government of Macau to promote and exhibit the culture and arts of Macau. It occupied the building which has a total built up area of 3,000 m^{2} and is made up of Straits-themed tiles and Siamese architecture, initially built as a British colonial government office before World War II.

== History ==
Both Malacca and Macau had been part of the Portuguese Empire.

Macau Gallery was first proposed by the Government of Malacca led by Mohd Ali Rustam, when the Chief Executive of Macau Edmund Ho paid an official visit to the state in 2007. After both governments agreed on a memorandum of understanding (MoU) for the management of the heritage building in 2009, the building was then renovated and converted into the gallery today, which was opened on 26 June 2012. The gallery was divided into four exhibition zones, which are: Macau Events, Macau World Heritage, Maritime Routes and "Origins and Culture". As of today, the gallery was shut down and converted into state government office.

== See also ==
- List of tourist attractions in Malacca
- China–Malaysia relations
