= Telok Mas =

Town in Central Melaka, Melaka, Malaysia

Coordinates: 2°10′N 102°19′E

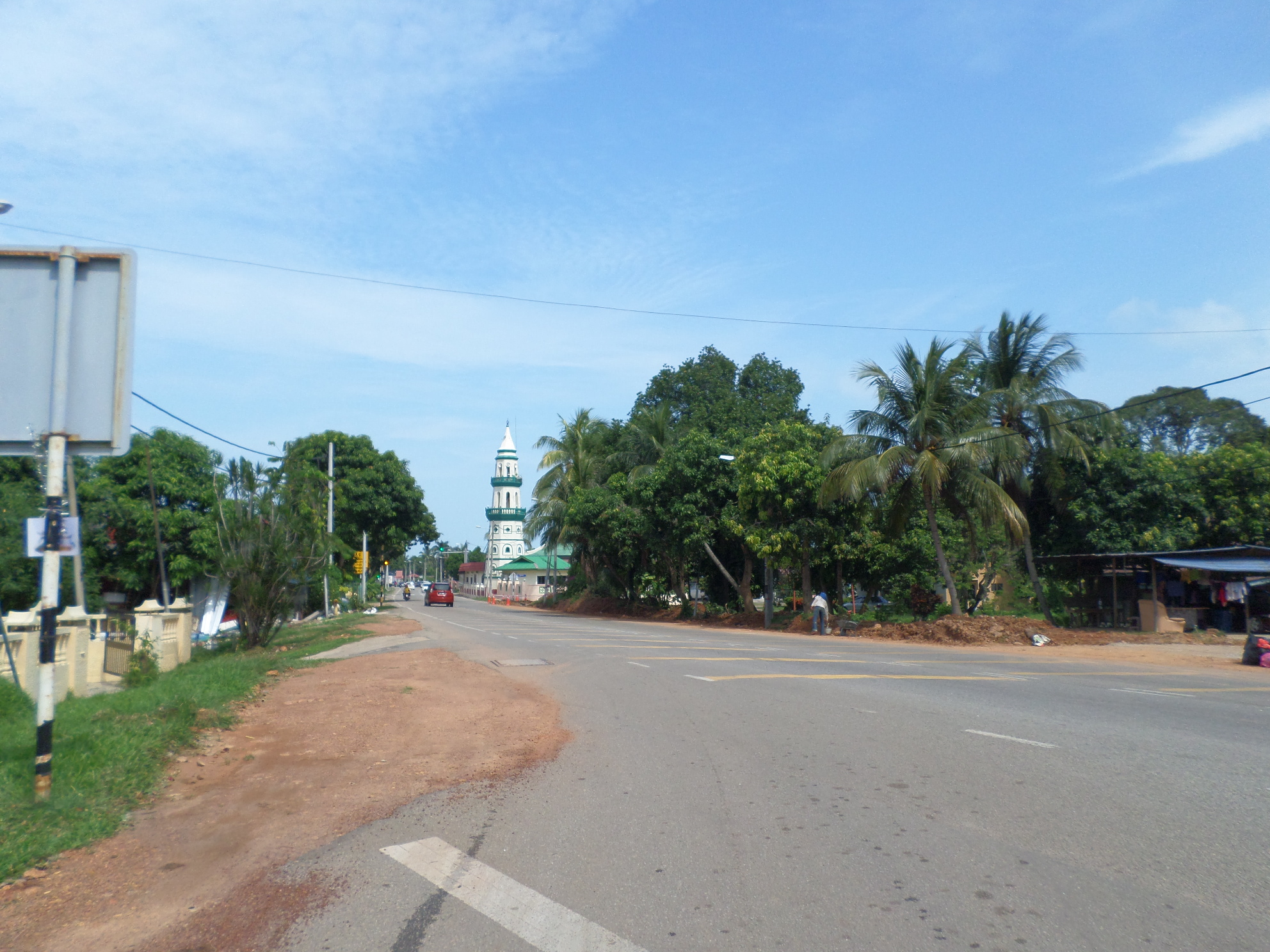
Telok Mas

Telok Mas is a small town in Melaka Tengah District, Malacca, Malaysia.

== Economy ==
- Telok Mas Industrial Estate

== Schools ==
- Henry Gurney Prisoners School
- SK Telok Mas
- SMK Telok Mas
- SMK Pernu
- SMK(A) Sharifah Rodziah
- SJK(C) Kuang Yah 光亚华小
- SRA Telok Mas

== See also ==
- List of cities and towns in Malaysia by population
