= Syarikat Air Melaka =

Syarikat Air Melaka Berhad (SAMB)
- Formerly: Lembaga Air Melaka (1971–1992); Perbadanan Air Melaka (1993–2005)
- Company type: State-owned enterprise
- Industry: Water supply management for Malacca
- Founded: 1993
- Headquarters: Lot 897, Wisma Air, Jalan Hang Tuah, 75300 Malacca, Malaysia
- Key people: Sulaiman Md Ali, Chairman; Abd Rashid Ab Rahman, Chief Executive Officer
- Parent: Chief Minister of Malacca Incorporation
- Website: www.samb.com.my

Syarikat Air Melaka Berhad (literally meaning Malacca Water Company Limited, abbreviated as SAMB), formerly known as Malacca Water Board (Malay: Lembaga Air Melaka) from 1971 to 1992 and Malacca Water Corporation (Malay: Perbadanan Air Melaka) from 1993 to 2005, is a government-linked company responsible for the water supply services of the state of Malacca.

== Sport ==
- SAMB FC (Association football)
