= Melaka Football Association =

Malaysian football club

Melaka Football Association Persatuan Bola Sepak Melaka
- Founded: 1924; 102 years ago as Malacca Amateur Football Association
- Purpose: Football association
- Headquarters: Wisma MAFA, Hang Jebat Sports Complex
- Location: Paya Rumput, Malacca, Malaysia
- President: Ab Rauf Yusoh
- Website: https://fam.org.my

Melaka Football Association (MAFA; Malay: Persatuan Bolasepak Melaka), is the governing body of football for the state of Malacca, Malaysia. MAFA is responsible for coordinating and developing football in the state and is affiliated with the Football Association of Malaysia (FAM) as the national governing body of football in Malaysia.

== History ==
=== Origins ===
Malacca has sent a football team to play in the Malaya Cup since its inaugural season in 1921. In 1924, the team has been registered and now managed by the newly formed governance body of Malacca football, the Malacca Amateur Football Association (MAFA). Since then, the football team has been competing in the Malaya Cup and the FAM Cup consistently. MAFA biggest achievement was reaching the FAM Cup final in 1957 and 1958 led by Robert Choe.

=== Amateur football league ===
In 1979, the Football Association of Malaysia (FAM) changed the format of the Piala Malaysia, introducing the league stage that acts as the qualifying round.

The football league in Malaysia has officially started in 1982, after the introduction of the league winners trophy. It has been known as the Liga Malaysia. Malacca football team continued to compete in the league and has become the champion during its second season, the only time the Malacca team has won the top-tier league in Malaysian football.

=== The era of semi-pro football league ===
Over the years, the league competition has gained important stature in its own right. From 1982 until 1988 the league has an amateur status and continues its purpose as qualifying round for the Piala Malaysia. In 1989, it is changed to a new format as the Liga Semi-Pro (MSPFL), introduced by FAM as a way towards the fully professional status. The inaugural season of MSPFL consisted of nine teams in Division I, and eight in Division II. Malacca had been in Division II from 1989 to 1992.

== Association management ==
Positions	Name
President	(Malaysia) Ab. Rauf Yusoh
Deputy president	(Malaysia) Mohd Saiful Mat Sapri
Vice president	(Malaysia) Khaidirah Abu Zahar
Vice president	(Malaysia) Fadzil A. Bakar
Vice president	(Malaysia) Khairi Anuar Ahmad
Vice president	(Malaysia) Revindran Chitravelu
General secretary	(Malaysia) Karim Yaacob
Treasurer	(Malaysia) Yuhaizad Abdullah
Executive committee members	(Malaysia) Mohd Azizi Shahril Abd Razak Khalim
Executive committee members	(Malaysia) Jezlee Pit
Executive committee members	(Malaysia) Dr Shankar Gunarasa
Executive committee members	(Malaysia) Siti Faidul Maisarah Abdullah
Executive committee members	(Malaysia) Mohd Fairuz Azwad Mohd Zauwawi
Executive committee members	(Malaysia) Ahmad Khairul Mohd Noor
Executive committee members	(Malaysia) Melvin Tan Ching Yang
Executive committee members	(Malaysia) Syahrul Nizam Shamsuddin

== Former presidents ==
Name	Period
(Malaysia) Md Yunus Husin	2007–2008
(Malaysia) Mohd Ali Rustam	2009–2010
(Malaysia) Md Yunus Husin	2011–April 2013
(Malaysia) Idris Haron	April 2013–2018
(Malaysia) Adly Zahari	2018–2020
(Malaysia) Damian Yeo Shen Li	20 January–20 March 2020
(Malaysia) Sulaiman Md Ali	20 March 2020–4 August 2022
(Malaysia) Nur Azmi Ahmad	4 August 2022–2 May 2023

== Competitions ==
The Melaka Football Association has organised the following club competitions:

- MAFA League Division 1
- MAFA League Division 2
- MAFA League Division 3
- Melaka FA Cup
- Melaka Charity Cup
- Melaka Governor Cup

== Notable affiliations ==
All-time clubs in the league competitions affiliated to the Melaka Football Association include:

- Melaka (Malaysia Super League)
- Melaka F.C. Under-20 (Malaysia A2 Amateur League)
- MBMB Warriors (Malaysia A3 Community League/Liga Melaka)
- Duyong Fighters (Malaysia A3 Community League/Liga Melaka)
- SAMB (Malaysia A3 Community League/Liga Melaka)
- Melaka Malay Football Association (Piala Emas Raja-Raja)
- Melaka FA U-20 (Piala Presiden)
- Melaka FA U-18 (Piala Belia)
- Melaka United Defunct
- Melaka City Defunct

== See also ==
- Football Association of Malaysia
- Piala Presiden (Malaysia)
- Piala Belia
- History of Malaysian football
