= MBMB Warriors F.C. =

Malaysian football club

MBMB Warriors
- Full name: Kelab Bolasepak Majlis Bandaraya Melaka Bersejarah
- Nickname: The Warriors
- Short name: MBMB
- Ground: Tun Fatimah Stadium; Hang Tuah Stadium
- Capacity: 1,000
- Owner: Malacca City Council
- Head coach: Hazlani Bin Hj. Jaafar
- League: Malaysia A2 Amateur League
Home colours	Away colours

MBMB Warriors Football Club, simply known as MBMB Warriors, is a Malaysian football club based in Malacca City, Malacca. The club is owned by the Malacca City Council (Majlis Bandaraya Melaka Bersejarah) and currently competes in the Malaysia A2 Amateur League, the third tier of the Malaysian football league system.

== History ==
MBMB Warriors joined several competitions organised by the Melaka Football Association and won the Melaka FA Cup in 2017. In the league competition club won the first title in the 2019 Liga Melaka.

=== Governor Cup ===
In 2023 it is the inaugural champion of the Melaka Governor's Cup. MBMB Warriors FC emerged as the inaugural champions of the 2022 Melaka Governor's Cup after defeating Tampoi F.C. 2–1 in the final last night. The victory allowed MBMB to win RM12,000 in cash along with the round trophy while as runners-up, Tampoi FC took home RM7,000 and accompanying prizes.

=== Malaysia A2 Amateur League ===
During the 2024–25 season, the club took part in the Melaka A3 Community League (Division 1), the regional qualifying competition in Malaysia's amateur league structure. MBMB Warriors emerged as champions and promoted by merit to the 2025–26 Malaysia A2 Amateur League.

== Players ==
As of September 2025

Note: Flags indicate national team as defined under FIFA eligibility rules; some limited exceptions apply. Players may hold more than one non-FIFA nationality.

No.	Pos.	Nation	Player
1	GK	MAS	Syafiq Abu Hassan
3	DF	MAS	Haiqal Rostam
4	MF	MAS	Norfaizatul Iqbal Ayub
5	DF	MAS	Rahmat Naemat
6	DF	MAS	Amiroul Syammim
7	MF	MAS	Khairul Hazwan
8	MF	MAS	Haziq Rezal
9	FW	MAS	Ariff Zaini
10	FW	MAS	Saufi Ibrahim (captain)
11	MF	MAS	Ikram Zainal
12	FW	MAS	Luqmanul Hakeem
13	MF	MAS	Azim Ahmad
14	MF	MAS	Fakhrullah Rosli

No.	Pos.	Nation	Player
15	DF	MAS	Asraf Md Nor
16	MF	MAS	Zaim Azmi
17	FW	MAS	Nazrol Zainal Abidin
19	DF	MAS	Aliff Danial
20	MF	MAS	Saiful Mustafa
21	DF	MAS	Syakir Baba
22	GK	MAS	Silmi Othman
23	MF	MAS	Zaim Abd.Razak
24	FW	MAS	Syazly Adly
25	DF	MAS	Amir Hassan
32	MF	MAS	Zharfan Amiruddin
33	FW	MAS	Nor Harith Roslan
42	GK	MAS	Amirul Solihin

== Management ==
As of September 2025

Position	Name
Team manager	(Malaysia) Shafrizal Bin Samad
Assistant team manager	(Malaysia) Amrie Bin Abdullah
Head coach	(Malaysia) Hazlani Bin Hj. Jaafar
Assistant coach	(Malaysia) Rajan A/L R. Krishnan
Goalkeeper coach	(Malaysia) Syafizullah Abdul Wahab
Fitness coach	(Malaysia) Ahmad Wardi Bin Salim Azuwad Bin Md Arip
Assistant fitness coach	(Malaysia) Azuwad Bin Md Arip
Physio	(Malaysia) Najmi Bin Hashim
Kitman	(Malaysia) Noorasid Bin Noordin (Malaysia) Md Shah Bin Awang

== Season by season record ==
Season	Division	Position	Malaysia Cup	Malaysian FA Cup	Malaysian Charity Shield	Regional	Top scorer (all competitions)
2017	Division 3	Champions	DNQ	DNQ	DNQ	DNQ	
2018	Division 2	Champions	DNQ	DNQ	DNQ	DNQ	
2019	Liga M5	Champions	DNQ	DNQ	DNQ	DNQ	
2020–21	Cancelled due to the COVID-19 pandemic						
2022	Liga M5	Runner-up	DNQ	DNQ	DNQ	DNQ	
2023	Not held						
2024	Liga A3	Champions	DNQ	DNQ	DNQ	DNQ	
2025–26	Liga A2	Quarter-finals	DNQ	DNQ	DNQ	DNQ	(Malaysia) Muhammad Ariff Zaini (4) (Malaysia) Nor Harith Roslan (4)

== Honours ==
=== League ===
- Melaka League Division 1
  - Champions (2): 2019, 2024
- Melaka League Division 2
  - Champions (1): 2018
- Melaka League Division 3
  - Champions (1): 2017

=== Cups ===
- Melaka Governor Cup
  - Champions (2): 2022, 2024
- Melaka Charity Cup
  - Champions (1): 2024
- Melaka FA Cup
  - Champions (1): 2017
