= Gallery of the Chief Minister of Malacca =

Gallery in Malacca, Malaysia

- Galeri Ketua Menteri Melaka
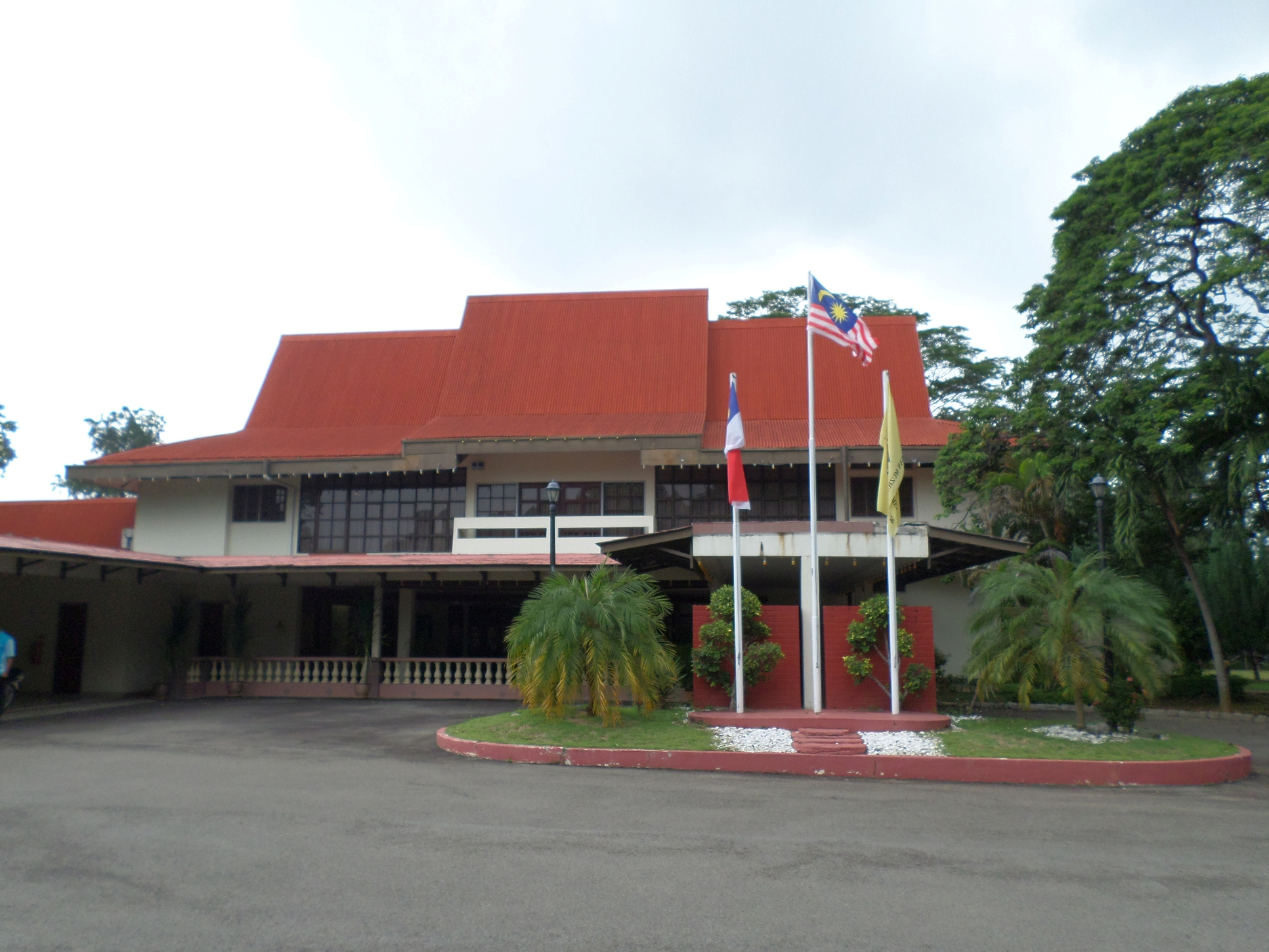
- Former name: Official Residence of the Chief Minister of Malacca
- Established: 2006
- Location: Peringgit, Malacca, Malaysia
- Coordinates: 2°13′13.8″N 102°15′21.0″E
- Type: gallery
- Owners: Malacca Museum Corporation (PERZIM) (Formerly Chief Minister's Office)

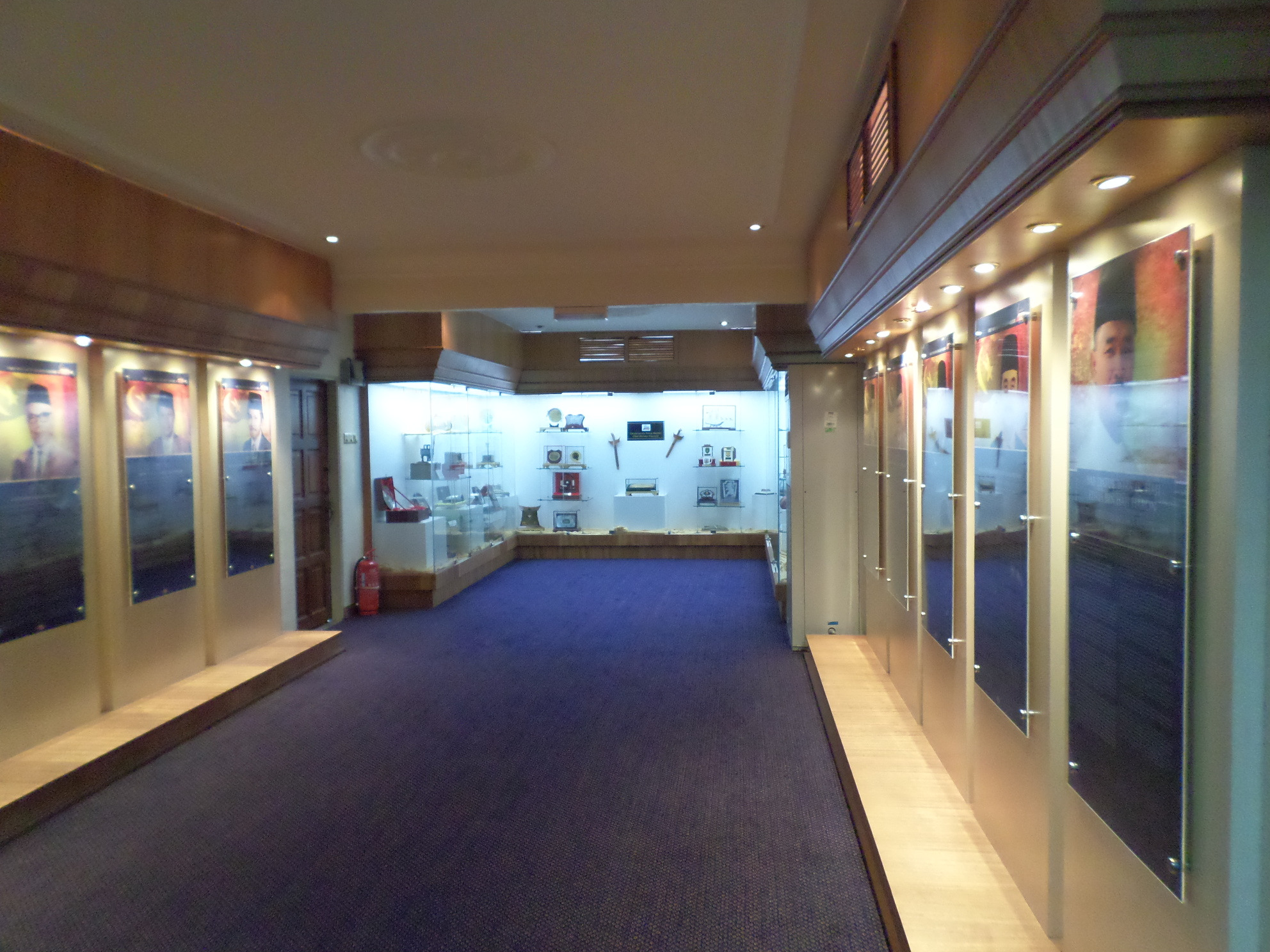
Exhibition hall

Gallery of the Chief Minister of Malacca (Malay: Galeri Ketua Menteri Melaka), also known as the Chief Minister of Melaka's Gallery, Melaka Chief Minister Gallery or Melaka Chief Ministers' Gallery (Note: The state government uses the Malay language spelling of the state's name, as opposed to the more traditional English language spelling of its name, "Malacca". These are the few known variants of the Official English translation for this gallery's name. Also, since the official language of the state is Malay, the Malay version of the name shall prevail in case of translation discrepancy or inconsistency.), is a gallery which displays gifts, souvenirs, personal collections and biographies of the State's Chief Ministers in the Peringgit suburb. Its building was used as the official residence for the Chief Ministers from 1972 until 2006, when the new one at the Seri Negeri complex in Ayer Keroh was completed.

== See also ==
- List of tourist attractions in Malacca
