= Casa Cuba =

Gallery in Malacca, Malaysia

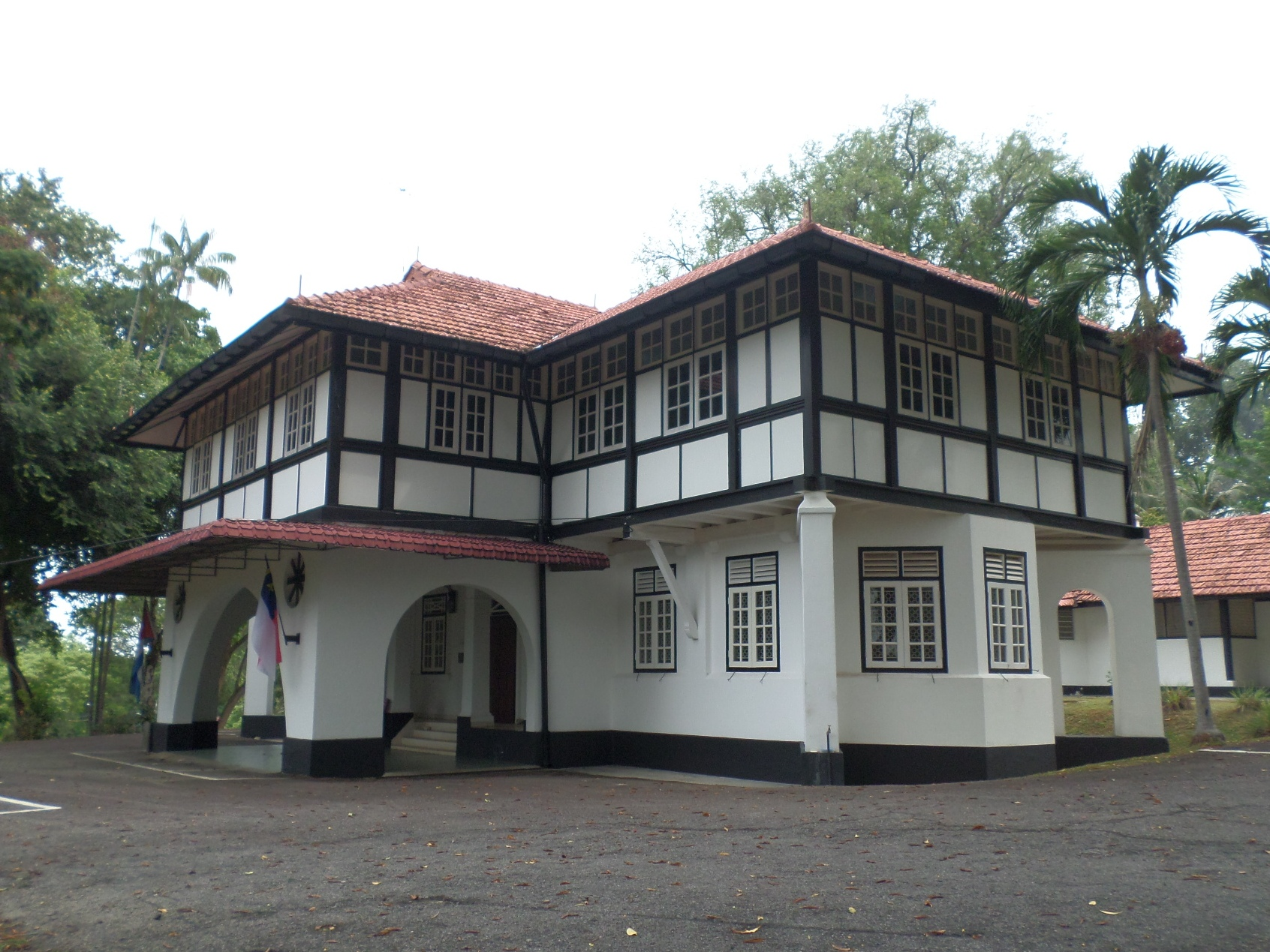
- Established: June 2007
- Dissolved: 2019
- Location: No. 10, Bukit Peringgit, Malacca, Malaysia
- Coordinates: 2°13′20.1″N 102°15′26.2″E
- Type: gallery

Casa Cuba was a gallery which displayed Cuban art in Bukit Peringgit, Malacca, Malaysia. The gallery was built in June 2007 in the former senior government officer's residence during British Malaya. An initiative of the Cuban embassy in Malacca, the gallery showcases various forms of art by Cuban artists, such as paintings, lithographs and ceramics. As of 2019, it was shut down and converted into state government office.

== See also ==
- List of tourist attractions in Malacca
- Cuba–Malaysia relations
