= Melaka Tengah District =

Administrative district in Malacca, Malaysia

- District of Malacca
- Daerah Melaka Tengah
- Interactive map of Melaka Tengah District
- Location of Melaka Tengah District in Malaysia
- Coordinates: 2°15′N 102°15′E
- Country: Malaysia
- State: Malacca
- Seat: Ayer Keroh
- Local area government(s): Malacca City Council (Melaka Tengah South); Hang Tuah Jaya Municipal Council (Melaka Tengah North)

Government
  - District officer: Shamsul Ambia Abdul Aziz

Area
  - Total: 314.19 km^{2} (121.31 sq mi)

Population (2020)
  - Total: 597,135
  - Density: 1,900.6/km^{2} (4,922.4/sq mi)
- Time zone: UTC+8 (MST)
  - Summer (DST): UTC+8 (Not observed)
- Postcode: 75xxx
- Calling code: +6-06
- Vehicle registration plates: M
- Website: https://pdtmt.gov.my/1/index.php

Melaka Tengah District (translated as Central Malacca District), formerly known as Central District, is one of the three administrative districts in Malacca, Malaysia. It borders Alor Gajah District to the north and Jasin District to the east. The capital of the state, Malacca City, is located in this district. This district is the major destination of tourists in Malacca as most historical spots are situated within it.

Melaka Tengah is administered by two local authorities, mostly Malacca City Council (Malay: Majlis Bandaraya Melaka Bersejarah, MBMB) and a small portion in the north by Hang Tuah Jaya Municipal Council (Malay: Majlis Perbandaran Hang Tuah Jaya, MPHTJ).

== Administrative divisions ==
Melaka Tengah District is further divided into 40 subdivisions; 29 townships (mukim), 2 big towns (bandar) and 9 small towns (pekan).

Population distribution by subdivisions
Subdivision	Population (2020)	Area (km^{2})	Population density (/km^{2})
Alai	11,120	6.3	1,760
Ayer Molek suburb	10,792	21.2	510
Ayer Molek town	41	0.1	725.7
Bachang	23,623	6.8	3,484
Balai Panjang	18,497	5.7	3,225
Batu Berendam suburb	46,859	12.8	3,670
Batu Berendam town	2,776	0.6	4,792
Bertam	17,119	5.1	3,345
Bukit Baru suburb	36,792	11.2	3,283
Bukit Baru town	14,006	3.8	3,668
Bukit Katil	59,132	33.6	1,759
Bukit Lintang	14,535	27.0	537.9
Bukit Piatu	4,871	1.5	3,326
Bukit Rambai suburb	26,364	17.5	1,507
Bukit Rambai town	377	0.1	3,557
Cheng	19,158	9.2	2,075
Duyong	22,093	5.7	3,894
Kandang suburb	5,513	3.9	1,425
Kandang town	72	0.1	1,230
Klebang town	6,915	1.7	4,018
Klebang Besar	5,081	3.1	1,654
Klebang Kecil	9,013	2.3	3,893
Krubong	31,936	14.5	2,196
City centre	62,175	27.2	2,290
Padang Semabok	729	0.6	1,166
Padang Temu	5,824	2.9	2,008
Paya Rumput suburb	19,565	13.7	1,432
Paya Rumput town	151	0.1	1,695

- Peringgit
- Pernu
- Semabok
- Sungai Udang
- Tangga Batu
- Tanjung Kling
- Tanjong Minyak
- Telok Mas
- Ujong Pasir
- Sungai Udang Town
- Tangga Batu Town
- Tanjung Kling Town

== See also ==
- Districts of Malaysia
