= 2022 Liga Melaka =

Liga Melaka
- Season: 2022

Liga Melaka 2022 was the 91st edition of the Liga Melaka.

== Statistics ==
Division	Champions	Runner-up
Division 1	Tampoi F.C.	MBMB Warriors F.C.
Division 2	Bertam Ulu F.C.	Duyong Fighters F.C.
Division 3	Rizq F.C.	Bachanglona F.C.

== Division 1 ==
Liga Melaka Division 1
- Season: 2022
- Champions: Tampoi
- Promoted: Tampoi
- Relegated: Gerakan; White Star

=== Group stage ===
==== Group A ====
Pos	Team	Pld	W	D	L	GF	GA	GD	Pts	Promotion, qualification or relegation
1	MBMB Warriors	6	6	0	0	32	4	+28	18	Knockout stage
2	Jebat	6	4	1	1	14	4	+10	13	Knockout stage
3	Teman FM	6	3	0	3	12	16	−4	9	
4	Persibu	6	2	2	2	7	13	−6	8	
5	Masjid Tanah	6	2	0	4	7	14	−7	6	Relegation to Division 2
6	Pulau Sebang	6	2	0	4	13	27	−14	6	Relegation to Division 2
7	Gerakan	6	0	1	5	6	13	−7	1	Relegation to Division 2

Updated to match(es) played on 21 September 2022. Source: Laman Facebook MUSA
Rules for classification: = 1) point; 2) goal difference; 3) goal scored

==== Group B ====
Pos	Team	Pld	W	D	L	GF	GA	GD	Pts	Promotion, qualification or relegation
1	Tampoi (C)	6	4	2	0	17	6	+11	14	Knockout stage
2	Hulubalang	6	4	2	0	15	5	+10	14	Knockout stage
3	Perma	6	3	1	2	14	11	+3	10	
4	UTeM Tuah	6	2	0	4	6	10	−4	6	
5	Pengkalan	6	2	0	4	10	17	−7	6	Relegation to Division 2
6	Andalas	6	1	2	3	7	8	−1	5	
7	White Star	6	1	1	4	8	20	−12	4	Relegation to Division 2

Updated to match(es) played on 21 September 2022. Source: Laman Facebook MUSA
Rules for classification: = 1) mata; 2) perbezaan gol; 3) gol dijaringkan
(C) Champions

=== Knockout stage ===
Semi-finals
MBMB Warriors	2
Hulubalang	1
Tampoi	2
Jebat	1

Final
MBMB Warriors	1
Tampoi	2

== Division 2 ==
Liga Melaka Division 2
- Season: 2022
- Champions: Bertam Ulu
- Promoted: Bertam Ulu; Duyong Fighters
- Relegated: Sri Peringgit Bersatu; MMU II

=== Group A ===
Pos	Team	Pld	W	D	L	GF	GA	GD	Pts	Promotion, qualification or relegation
1	Duyong Fighters	5	5	0	0	15	3	+12	15	Knockout stage
2	Bertam Ulu (C)	5	4	0	1	15	4	+11	12	Knockout stage
3	Panglima	5	3	0	2	8	5	+3	9	
4	Seri Mayor	5	2	0	3	5	9	−4	6	
5	ASA-GP Melaka	5	1	0	4	3	8	−5	3	
6	Sri Peringgit Bersatu	5	0	0	5	2	19	−17	0	Relegation to Division 3

Updated to match(es) played on 9 May 2023. Source: Laman Facebook MUSA
Rules for classification: = 1) point; 2) goal difference; 3) goal scored
(C) Champions

=== Group B ===
Pos	Team	Pld	W	D	L	GF	GA	GD	Pts	Promotion, qualification or relegation
1	Durian Tunggal United	5	2	3	0	8	3	+5	9	Knockout stage
2	Bara	5	2	3	0	7	3	+4	9	Knockout stage
3	PSP	5	1	4	0	5	4	+1	7	
4	Arena FM	5	1	3	1	6	8	−2	6	
5	Tedong	5	0	3	2	5	9	−4	3	
6	MMU II	5	0	2	3	2	6	−4	2	Relegation to Division 3

Updated to match(es) played on 21 September 2022. Source: Laman Facebook MUSA
Rules for classification: = 1) point; 2) goal difference; 3) goal scored

=== Knockout stage ===
Semi-finals
Duyong Fighters	4
Bara	3
Durian Tunggal United	0
Bertam Ulu	2

Final
Duyong Fighters	2
Bertam Ulu	3

== Division 3 ==
Liga Melaka Division 3
- Season: 2022
- Champions: Rizq
- Promoted: Rizq; Bachanglona; Pekala; Didad

=== Group A ===
Pos	Team	Pld	W	D	L	GF	GA	GD	Pts	Promotion, qualification or relegation
1	Peringgit Muafakat	3	2	1	0	7	0	+7	7	Knockout stage
2	Gedong Lalang	3	2	1	0	6	1	+5	7	Knockout stage
3	All Star United	3	1	0	2	2	5	−3	3	
4	MBFA	3	0	0	3	0	9	−9	0	

Updated to match(es) played on unknown. Source: MUSA

=== Group B ===
Pos	Team	Pld	W	D	L	GF	GA	GD	Pts	Promotion, qualification or relegation
1	Rizq	3	3	0	0	14	3	+11	9	Knockout stage
2	Sang Helang	3	2	0	1	7	4	+3	6	Knockout stage
3	Henry Gurney	3	0	1	2	4	8	−4	1	
4	Prestige	3	0	1	2	3	13	−10	1	

Updated to match(es) played on unknown. Source: MUSA

=== Group C ===
Pos	Team	Pld	W	D	L	GF	GA	GD	Pts	Promotion, qualification or relegation
1	Pekala	3	3	0	0	10	4	+6	9	Knockout stage
2	Surya	3	1	1	1	7	8	−1	4	Knockout stage
3	Srikandi	3	1	0	2	5	8	−3	3	
4	Taming Sari	3	0	1	2	3	5	−2	1	

Updated to match(es) played on unknown. Source: MUSA

=== Group D ===
Pos	Team	Pld	W	D	L	GF	GA	GD	Pts	Promotion, qualification or relegation
1	Merlimau	3	3	0	0	13	2	+11	9	Knockout Stage
2	Semabok Dalam	3	2	0	1	5	3	+2	6	Knockout Stage
3	Just In	3	1	0	2	7	9	−2	3	
4	AG Tigers	3	0	0	3	4	15	−11	0	

Updated to match(es) played on 26 Mei 2022. Source: MUSA

=== Group E ===
Pos	Team	Pld	W	D	L	GF	GA	GD	Pts	Promotion, qualification or relegation
1	Bachanglona	3	3	0	0	17	1	+16	9	Knockout stage
2	TSR	3	1	1	1	4	5	−1	4	Knockout stage
3	Durian Tunggal	3	1	1	1	6	8	−2	4	
4	Alai	3	0	0	3	2	15	−13	0	

Updated to match(es) played on unknown. Source: MUSA

=== Group F ===
Pos	Team	Pld	W	D	L	GF	GA	GD	Pts	Promotion, qualification or relegation
1	Permata Satria	3	2	1	0	6	3	+3	7	Knockout stage
2	TABA	3	2	0	1	6	4	+2	6	Knockout stage
3	Tajam	3	1	0	2	7	10	−3	3	
4	Taman Wira Tehel	3	0	1	2	6	8	−2	1	

Updated to match(es) played on unknown. Source: MUSA

=== Group G ===
Pos	Team	Pld	W	D	L	GF	GA	GD	Pts	Promotion, qualification or relegation
1	Didad	3	2	1	0	17	1	+16	7	Knockout stage
2	Alai Empire	3	2	1	0	13	2	+11	7	Knockout stage
3	Batang Melaka	3	1	0	2	11	8	+3	3	
4	Lekir	3	0	0	3	1	31	−30	0	

Updated to match(es) played on unknown. Source: MUSA

=== Group H ===
Pos	Team	Pld	W	D	L	GF	GA	GD	Pts	Promotion, qualification or relegation
1	Serkam United	3	3	0	0	8	0	+8	9	Knockout stage
2	Melayu Melaka	3	1	1	1	2	4	−2	4	Knockout stage
3	Atok Gagah Perkasa	3	0	2	1	1	2	−1	2	
4	Divisyen Komuniti Belia Remaja	3	0	1	2	2	7	−5	1	

Updated to match(es) played on unknown. Source: MUSA

=== Knockout stage ===
==== Bracket ====
Round of 16
1	Peringgit Muafakat	0
16	Sang Helang	1
8	Rizq	3
9	Gedong Lalang	0
5	Pekala	2
12	Semabok Dalam	0
4	Merlimau	3 (0)
13	Surya	3 (3)
6	Bachanglona	2
11	TABA	1
3	Permata Satria	4
14	TSR	2
7	Didad	3
10	Melayu Melaka	0
2	Serkam United	1
15	Alai Empire	0

Quarter-final
Sang Helang	0
Rizq	2
Pekala	2
Surya	1
Bachanglona	1
Permata Satria	0
Didad	0 (4)
Serkam United	0 (3)

Semi-final
Rizq	1
Pekala	0
Bachanglona	3
Didad	2

Final
Rizq	3
Bachanglona	1
