= Peringgit =

Mukim in Melaka Tengah, Malacca, Malaysia

- Suburb of Malacca City

Other transcription(s)
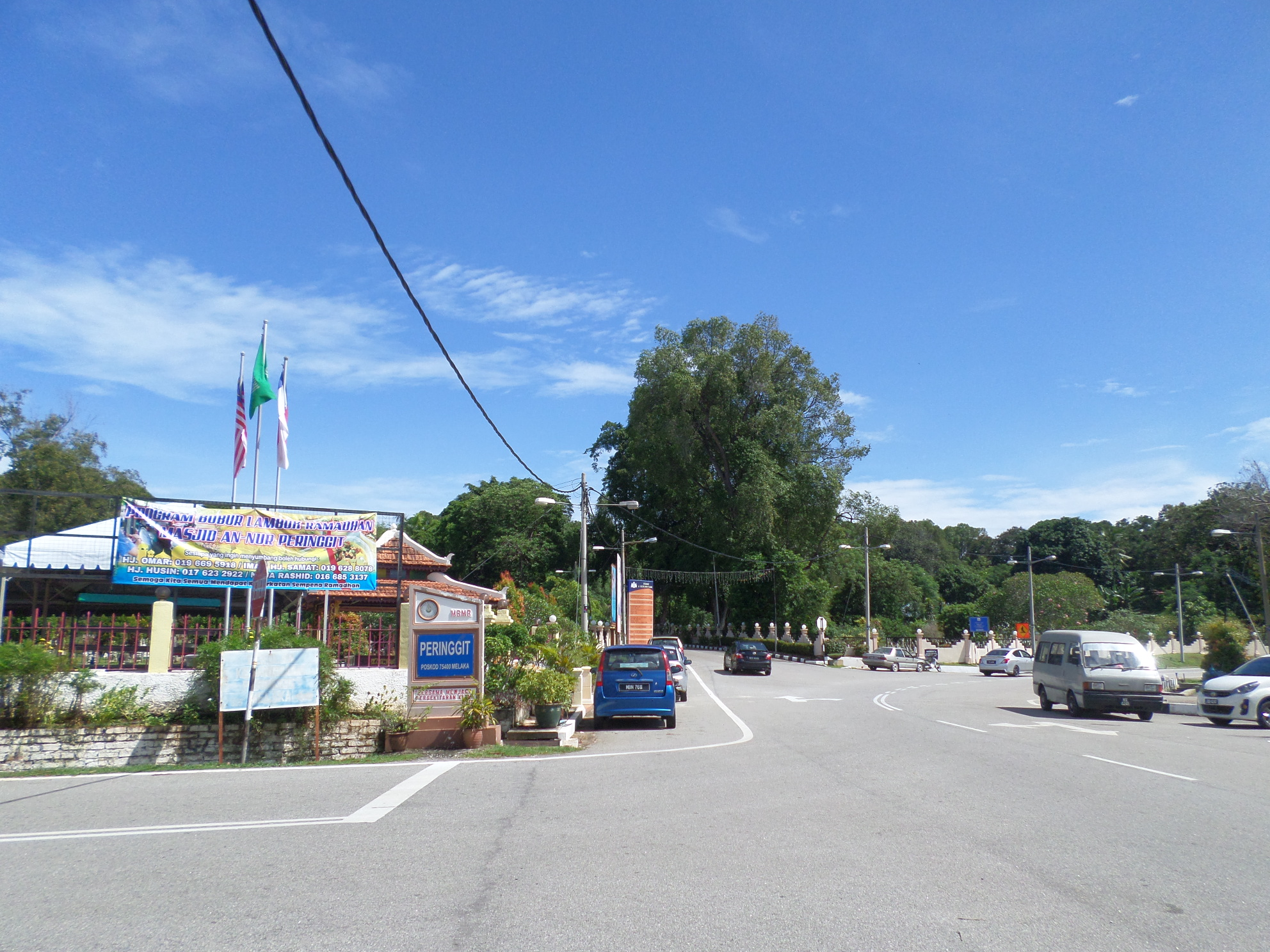

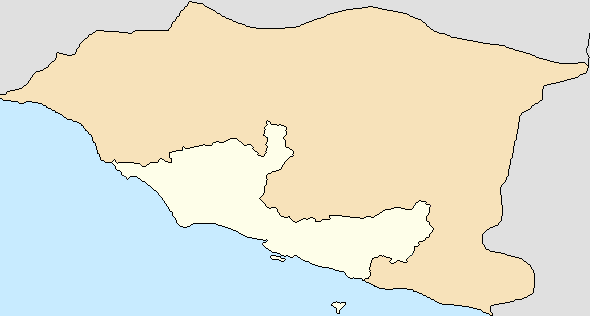
- Location within Malacca City
- Coordinates: 2°13′17.1″N 102°15′19.3″E
- Country: Malaysia
- State: Malacca
- District: Melaka Tengah
- City: Malacca City

Peringgit is a suburb of Malacca City and a mukim of Melaka Tengah District in the Malaysian state of Malacca. It is home to several bungalows functioning as government offices and quarters or state galleries, which were built during British colonial era and located at the top of the Bukit Peringgit Hill.

== Economy ==
- Lotus's Supermarket Peringgit

== Education ==
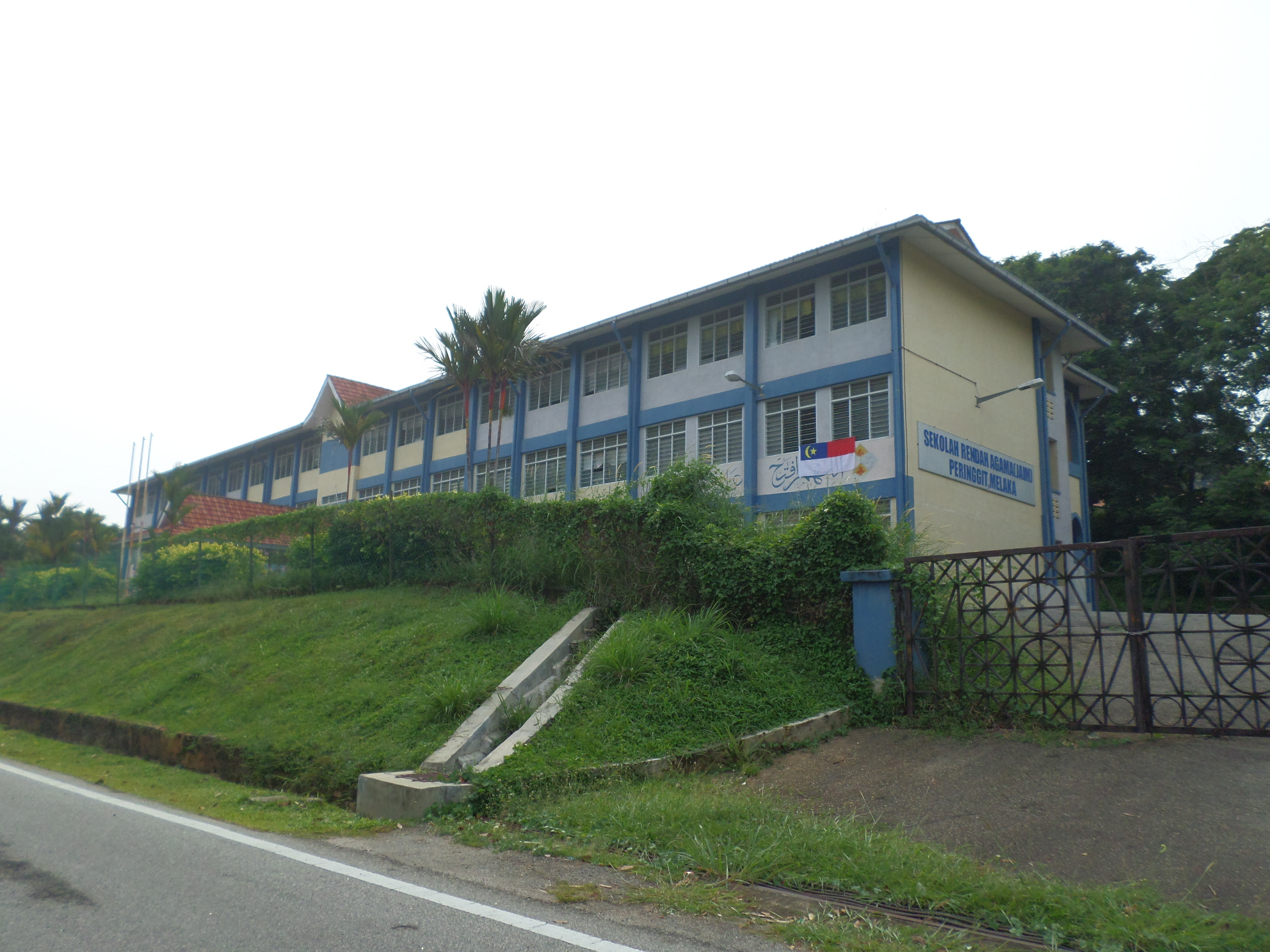
Peringgit Religious Primary School

- Peringgit National Primary School (Sekolah Kebangsaan Peringgit)
- Peringgit JAIM Religious Primary School (Sekolah Rendah Agama Peringgit)

== Tourist attractions ==
- Gallery of the Chief Minister of Malacca
- Tun Abdul Ghafar Baba Memorial

=== Former tourist attractions ===
- Macau Gallery Melaka (now Malacca Implementation and Monitoring Office)
- Casa Cuba (now Malacca Islands Development Council Office)

== Transportation ==
Peringgit is home to Melaka Sentral, the largest bus station in the state of Malacca and its main transportation hub.
