= Tun Fatimah Stadium =

Stadium in Central Melaka, Melaka, Malaysia

- Stadium Tun Fatimah
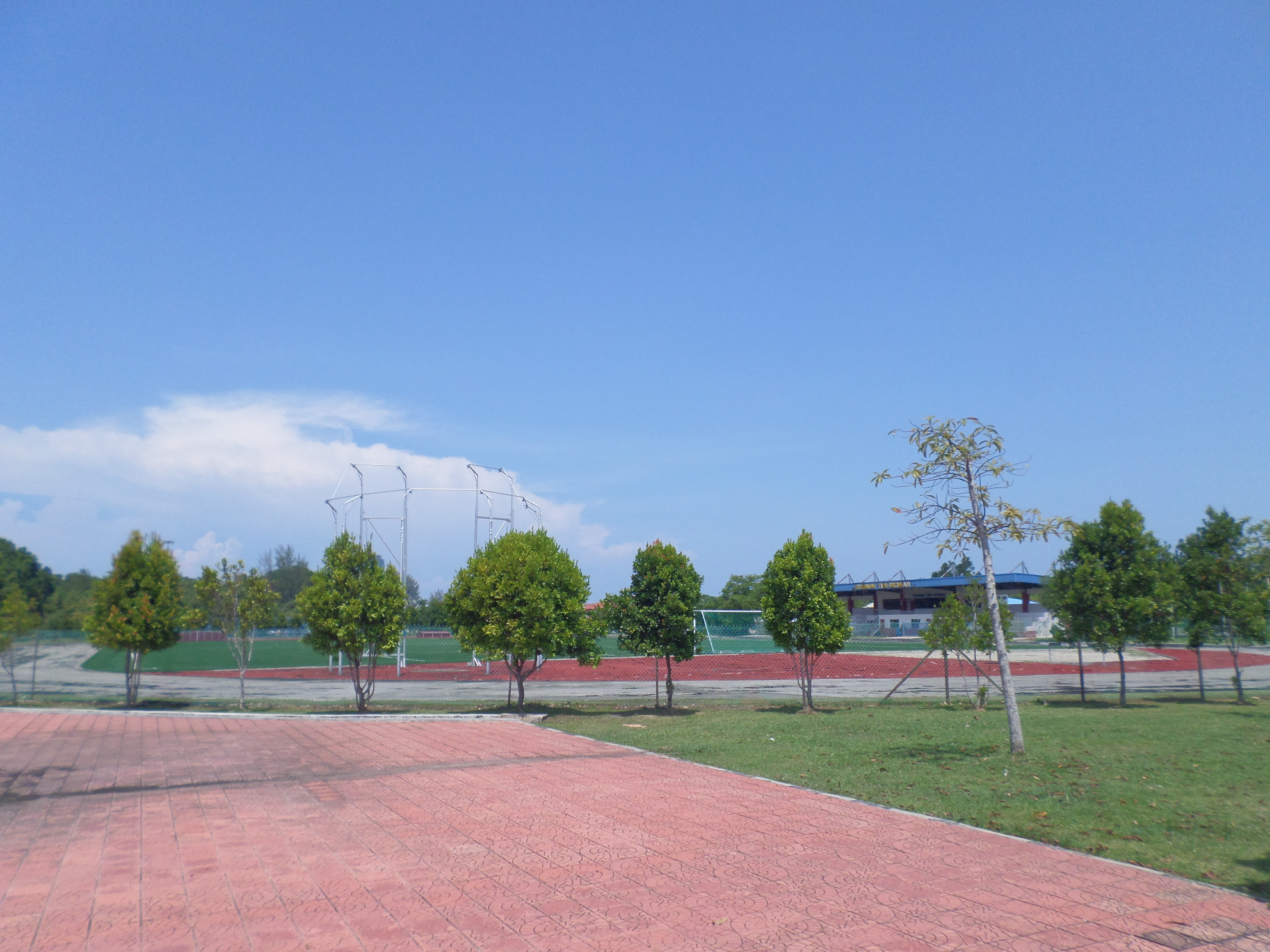
- Interactive map of Tun Fatimah Stadium
- Location: Semabok, Melaka, Malaysia
- Coordinates: 2°12′12.9″N 102°16′03.0″E
- Owner: Malacca City Council
- Type: Stadium
- Surface: Grass pitch

The Tun Fatimah Stadium (Malay: Stadium Tun Fatimah) is a multi-use stadium in Semabok, Melaka, Malaysia. The stadium gets its name from Tun Fatimah, a 16th-century Malaccan hero, and takes 1,000 spectators.

== Notable events ==
- 13th Sukma Games, June 2010

== See also ==
- List of tourist attractions in Melaka
- List of football stadiums in Malaysia
- Duyong Fighters F.C.
- MBMB Warriors F.C.
