= Liga Melaka =

- Founded: 1929; 97 years ago
- Country: Malaysia
- Confederation: AFC
- Divisions: Division 1 Division 2 Division 3
- Number of clubs: Division 1: 10; Division 2: 12; Division 3: 12
- Level on pyramid: 4–6
- Feeder to: Malaysia A2 Amateur League (from Division 1)
- Domestic cup(s): Malaysia FA Cup; Melaka FA Cup
- Current champions: MBMB Warriors (Division 1); SAMB II (Division 2); Lekir F.C. (Division 3)
- Most championships: SAMB (Division 1) (5 titles)
- Current: 2024 Liga Melaka

Liga Melaka or Malacca League is a state level football league held in Malacca, Malaysia. The league is managed by the football authority of Malacca, the Melaka Football Association (MAFA).

== History ==
The earliest recorded state football league took place in Malacca in 1929. The winner was Malacca Chinese FA.

In 1936, five teams participated in the league (Rangers, Police, CFA I, CFA II and G. Services). In 1965, seven teams participated in the league (New Market SC, Hakka Association PWD/Survey SC, 1-10 Gurkha Rifles, Malacca Police, Kilat Club, Medicals SC and 1st Battalion Scots Guards). Unfortunately the winners for both years are unknown.

In 2014, the Liga Melaka was relaunched with two divisions. In 2015, a total of 44 teams competed in the league. The first division consisted of 16 teams divided into two groups, while the second division had 28 teams in four groups.

At the end of 2016, MUSA has announced that the new season will start on 26 February 2017, instead of late year. A third division was introduced. A total of 43 teams competed in 2017 season. Piala FA Liga Melaka was also introduced at the start of the season, featuring all three divisions.

Starting in 2018, the top league in the Melaka League (Division 1) became part of the M5 League recognized by the Malaysian Football League, making this the level 5 in the Malaysian football league system.

In 2024, the Melaka League Division 1 become one of the 2024–25 Malaysia A3 Community League registered under the Amateur Football League (AFL). It has been rebranded as the Most Honorable President's League Division 1 Cup of the Melaka Football Association.

== Piala FA Liga Melaka ==
For 2017 season, MUSA has introduced a knockout cup tournament called Piala FA Liga Melaka, played at the start of the season, featuring all three divisions of the Liga Melaka.

== Melaka Open Veteran League ==
MUSA also holds other leagues, such as the Melaka Open Veteran League which consist of 16 teams. The players qualified for this league must be over 40 years old.

== Competition ==
The structure of the league competition is as below:

Level	Total teams	League(s) / division(s)
1 (3)	10	MAFA League Division 1 ↑ 1 promotion ↓ 2 relegations
2 (4)	12	MAFA League Division 2 ↑ 3 promotions ↓ 2 relegations
3 (5)	10	MAFA League Division 3 ↑ 3 promotions

== Current teams ==
Below are listed the member teams of the FA Melaka League for the 2024 season.

=== MAFA League Division 1 ===
- Andalas FC
- Bertam Ulu FC
- Duyong Fighters
- Hulubalang FC
- MBMB Warriors
- Panglima FC
- Perma FC
- PSP FC
- Tedong FC
- Teman FM FC

=== MAFA League Division 2 ===
- Alai Empire FC
- Arena FM FC
- Bachanglona FC
- Bara FC
- Durian Tunggal FC
- Durian Tunggal United
- Henry Gurney FC
- Merlimau Pasir FC
- MMU Melaka
- Peringgit Muafakat FC
- SAMB FC II
- Taba FC

=== MAFA League Division 3 ===
- Adiputra FC
- Air Merbau FC
- Alor Gajah Police
- Lekir FC
- Melaka Bersatu F.A.
- Melaka Indian F.A.
- Srikandi FC
- Surya FC
- Taming Sari FC
- TSR FC

== Past league winners ==
Division 1

Year	Champions	Runner-up
1929	Malacca Chinese FA	
1930	Malacca Club	
1931	Not contested	
1932–1939	Unknown	
1940–1945	Cancelled due to the World War II	
1946–1948	Unknown	
1949	Muar Youngsters	
1950	Unknown	
1951	Malacca Police S.C.	Detention Camp
1962	New Market S.C.	
1963	Unknown	
1964	New Market S.C.	
1965–2010	Unknown	
2011	SAMB	
2012	SAMB	
2013	SAMB	
2014–15	SAMB	Gajah Berang F.C.
2015–16	Hulubalang F.C.	Perma F.C.
2017	UtEM F.C.	Gerakan F.C.
2018	SAMB	Masjid Tanah FC
2019	MBMB Warriors	Andalas
2020–21	Cancelled due to the COVID-19 pandemic	
2022	Tampoi	MBMB Warriors
2023	Not held	
2024	MBMB Warriors	Hulubalang F.C.

Division 2

Year	Champions	Runner-up
2014–15	Bawean F.C.	Air Merbau F.C.
2015–16	BSN Melaka F.C.	Teman FM F.C.
2017	Pengkalan F.C.	Pulau Sebang F.C.
2018	MBMB Warriors	Andalas
2019	White Star	Persibu
2020–21	Cancelled due to the COVID-19 pandemic	
2022	Bertam Ulu F.C.	Duyong Fighters
2023	Not held	
2024	SAMB II	Bara F.C.

Division 3

Year	Champions	Runner-up
2017	MBMB Warriors	Andalas F.C.
2018	Jebat F.C.	Multimedia University II F.C.
2019	Bertam Ulu F.C.	Peringgit Bersatu
2020-21	Cancelled due to the COVID-19 pandemic	
2022	Rizq F.C.	Bachanglona F.C.
2023	Not held	
2024	Lekir F.C.	Taming Sari F.C.

== Melaka Charity Cup (Piala Sumbangsih Melaka) ==
Year	Winners	Runners-up	Score in final
2024	MBMB Warriors	Bertam Ulu F.C.	2–1

== Melaka FA Cup ==
Year	Winners	Runners-up	Score in final
2017	MBMB Warriors	Perma F.C.	4–1

== Melaka Governor Cup ==
Year	Winners	Runners-up	Score in final
2022	MBMB Warriors	Tampoi F.C.	2–1
2023	Tampoi F.C.	Perma F.C.	1–1 (3–2)
2024	MBMB Warriors	Tampoi F.C.	1–0
2025	Tampoi F.C.	Morten F.C.	4–0

== Defunct teams ==
- Air Merbau
- All Star United
- Arena SW Corp
- Bawean
- Bemban Utama
- Gajah Berang
- K.A.T.A
- KBBPNM
- Kiddo-Kickers
- KMB United
- Melayu Melaka
- MS JKR
- Prestige
- Sang Helang
- Selat
- Taman Wira
