= Cheng Township =

Town in Central Melaka, Melaka, Malaysia

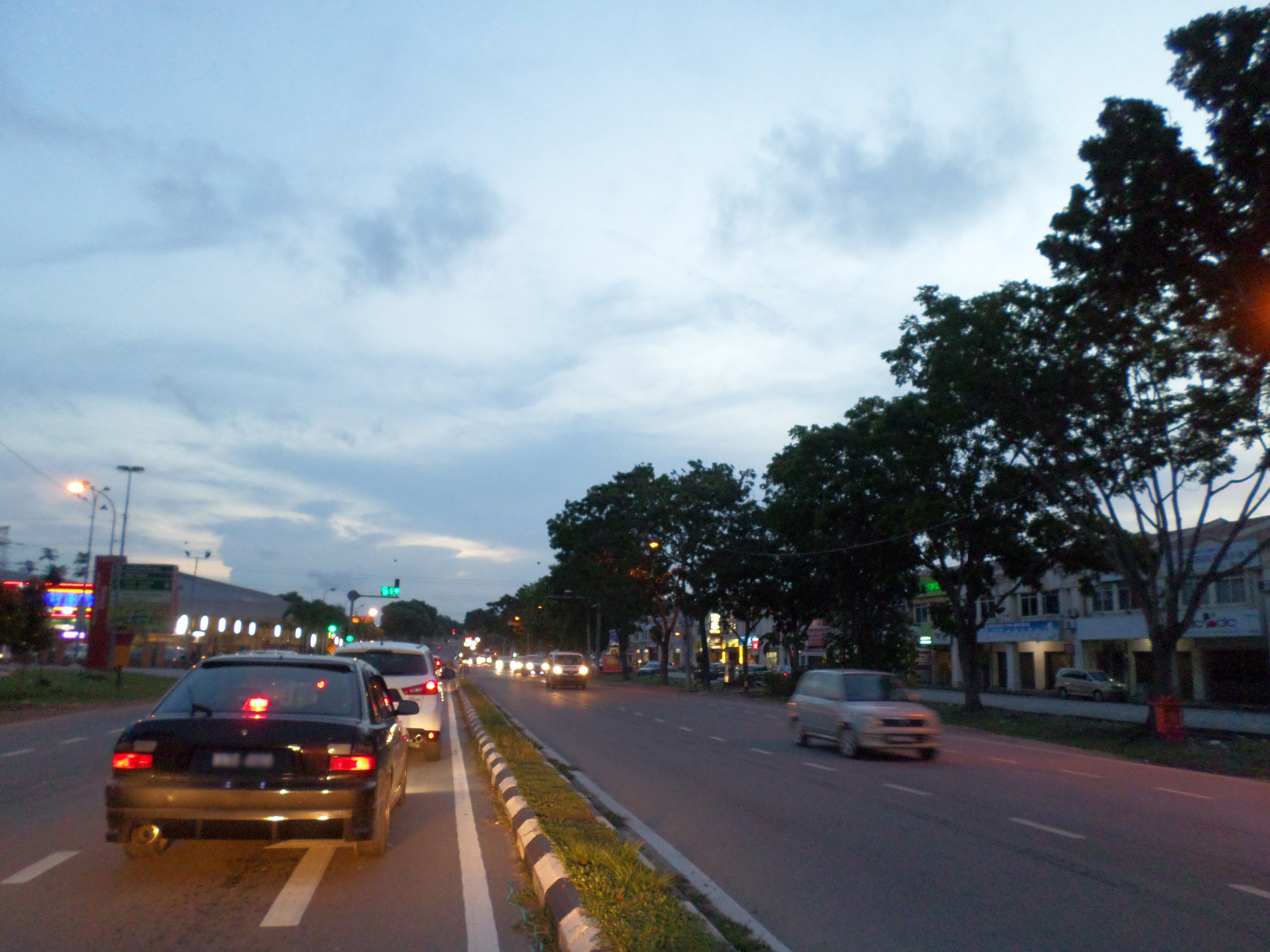
Cheng

Cheng in Melaka Tengah District

Cheng is a mukim and town in Melaka Tengah District, Malacca, Malaysia. It is located around 15 km from Malacca City.

== Economy ==
- Cheng Technology Park
- Lotus's Cheng (formerly Tesco Cheng) - Supermarket

== See also ==
- List of cities and towns in Malaysia by population
