= Henry Gurney School =

Malaysian school network for young offenders

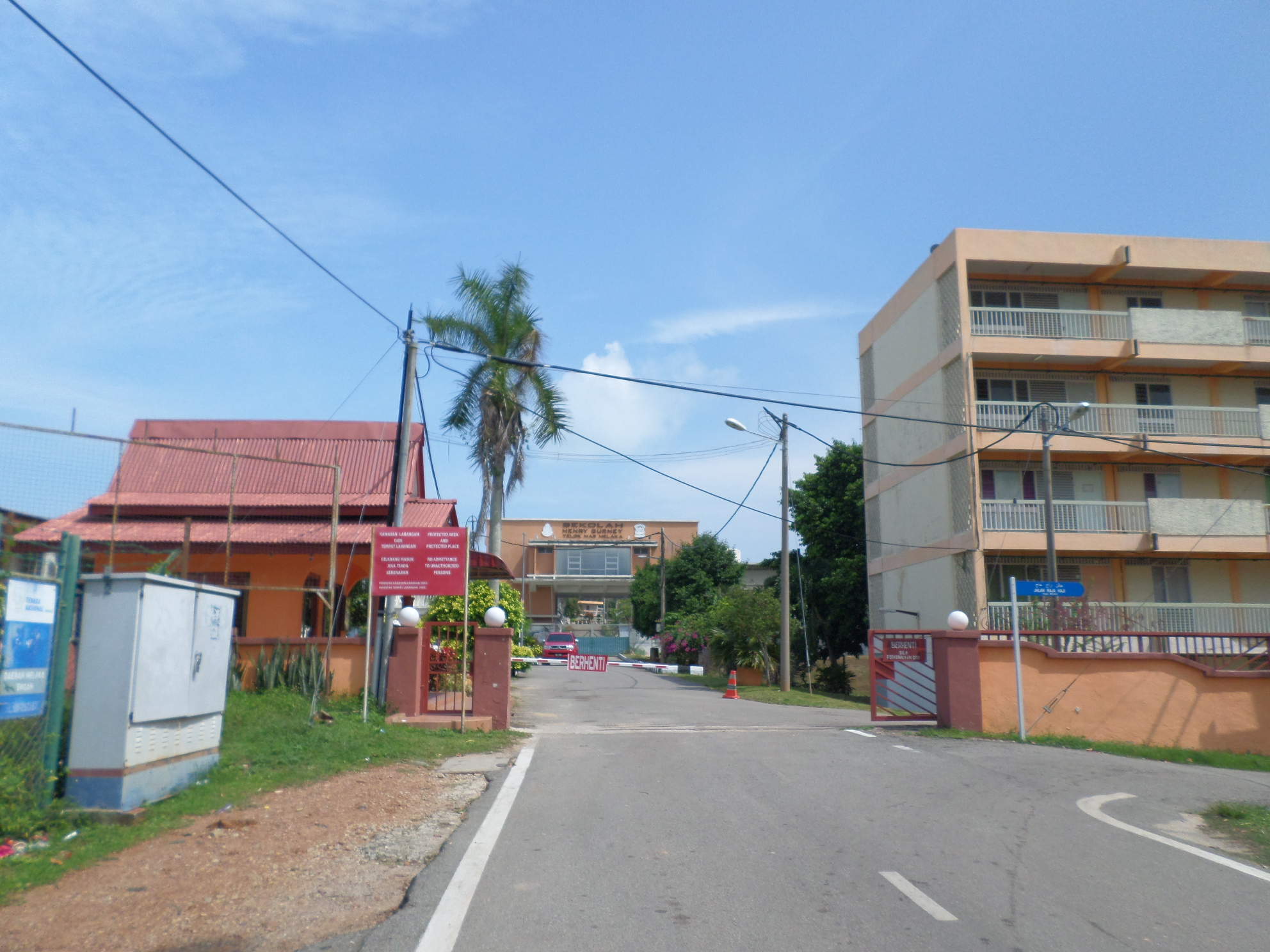
Henry Gurney School

School emblem

The Henry Gurney Schools (Malay: Sekolah Henry Gurney) are centres established in 1949 under Juvenile Courts Act 1947 [Act 90] to care for young offenders in Malaysia, and were known as High Moral Schools before 15 May 1950. They are for children and young people aged 14 to 20.

== List of Henry Gurney schools ==
Initially, only two Henry Gurney schools were created.

As per now, the schools have expanded as follows:-

- Henry Gurney School, Batu Gajah, Perak (all-girls)
- Henry Gurney School, Telok Mas, Malacca (co-educational)
- Henry Gurney School, Kota Kinabalu, Sabah (all-girls)
- Henry Gurney School Puncak Borneo, Kuching, Sarawak (all-boys)
- Henry Gurney School, Keningau, Sabah (all-boys)
