= Hang Tuah Stadium =

Stadium in Malacca, Malaysia

Coordinates: 2°12′10″N 102°14′43″E

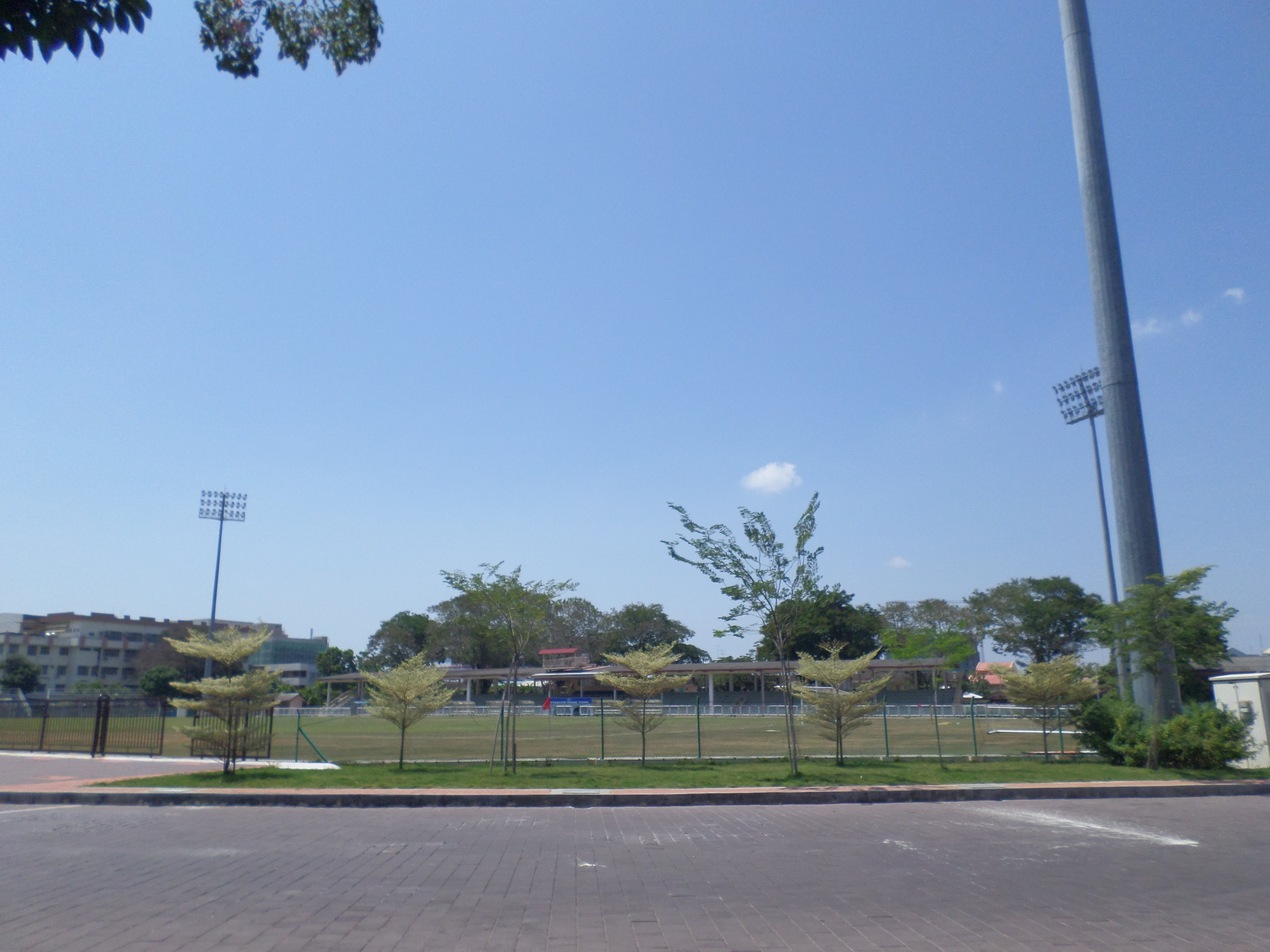
- Interactive map of Hang Tuah Stadium
- Former names: Stadium Kubu (Kubu Stadium)
- Location: Malacca City, Malacca, Malaysia
- Owner: Perbadanan Stadium Melaka (Malacca Stadium Corporation)
- Capacity: 15,000 (1954–2012); 1,000 (2012–)
- Surface: Grass pitch

Construction
- Opened: 1954
- Renovated: 2012, 2014

Tenants
- Melaka United (1954–2022); TM F.C. SAMB (2016–2019, 2024–present); Melaka City (2020–2021); Melaka (selected matches); Liga Melaka; MBMB Warriors (2025–present); Machan (2025–present)

The Hang Tuah Stadium or Stadium Kubu is a multi-use stadium in Malacca City, Malacca, Malaysia. The stadium originally had a capacity of 15,000, with 1,000 seating capacity. It is mostly used for football matches, previously as the home stadium for SAMB and as the second home stadium/training ground for Melaka United.

== History ==
Stadium Hang Tuah is the oldest stadium in the state of Malacca. It was formerly known as the Stadium Kubu (English: Fortress Stadium) and was officially opened in 1954 by the honourable Mr. G.E.C Wisdom C.M.G., which at that time was the president commissioner of Malacca, president of the Municipal Council, and president of Malacca Stadium. At that time the stadium is under the management of Malacca Stadium Committee.

On 31 August 2001, the name was eventually changed to Stadium Hang Tuah. The launching ceremony was made by His Excellency Syed Ahmad Syed Mahmud Shahabuddin, Yang di-Pertua Negeri of Malacca.

On 1 June 2005, Stadium Hang Tuah management was transferred to Perbadanan Stadium Melaka (English: Malacca Stadium Corporation) from Malacca City Council (MBMB).

The stadium received a major renovation in 2012 when most of the older seating stand was destroyed in order to create an open space to promote "green area" in Malacca City centre.

The stadium was once again renovated in 2015, costing RM 3 million, when Frenz United Football Academy collaborated with local government to open their academy in Malacca.

In 2019, SAMB has chosen the Stadium Hang Tuah as the club home stadium for its Liga M3 campaign.

== Events ==
- 2010 Sukma Games
- Liga Premier
- Liga FAM
- Piala Malaysia
- Piala FA
- Piala Presiden
- Mawlid procession

== See also ==
- List of tourist attractions in Malacca
- Hang Jebat Stadium
- List of football stadiums in Malaysia
