= SAMB F.C. =

Malaysian football club

SAMB Football Club
- Full name: Syarikat Air Melaka Berhad Football Club
- Nickname(s): The Blue Warrior
- Founded: 2010; 15 years ago
- Ground: Hang Tuah Stadium; Hang Jebat Stadium
- Capacity: 1,000; 40,000
- Owner: Syarikat Air Melaka Berhad
- President: Mohd. Khalid bin Nasir
- League: Malaysia A2 Amateur League
- 2024–25: Quarter-finalist

Syarikat Air Melaka Berhad Football Club is a football club based in Malacca, Malaysia. The club was formerly known as the Perbadanan Air Melaka (PAM).

== History ==
Syarikat Air Melaka Berhad Football Club had their first major success in the 2011 season, when they won the 2011 Liga Melaka. Domestically, SAMB FC has won the Malaysia football tournament, lastly in the 2018, and been eligible to compete in the Malaysia M3 League.

They have played in the previous incarnation of third-tier division in Malaysian football, the Malaysia FAM League from 2016 until 2017. In 2018, they withdrew from the FAM League and played in the Liga Melaka Division 1. They earned promotion into the third-tier division, the Malaysia M3 League in 2019. However, for the 2020 season, they withdrew due to financial reasons. Their slot in the M3 League was given to Melaka City.

After a break of several years, SAMB returned to join the 2024–25 Malaysia A2 Amateur League, the third-tier league organised by the Amateur Football League (AFL).

== Kit manufacturers and shirt sponsors ==
Season	Kit manufacturer	Main sponsor
2016	Kronos	Syarikat Air Melaka Berhad
2017	Kronos	Syarikat Air Melaka Berhad
2018	Warrix Sports	Syarikat Air Melaka Berhad
2019	Heat	Syarikat Air Melaka Berhad
2024–	ZeroFour	Syarikat Air Melaka Berhad

== Season by season record ==
Season	Division	Position	Malaysia Cup	Malaysian FA Cup	Malaysian Charity Shield	Regional	Top scorer (all competitions)
2016	Liga FAM	Quarter Final	DNQ	DNQ	DNQ	DNQ	
2017	Liga FAM	Group B, Fifth position	DNQ	First Round	DNQ	DNQ	
2018	Liga Melaka	Winner	DNQ	DNQ	DNQ	DNQ	
2019	Liga M3	9th place	DNQ	First Round	DNQ	DNQ	(Malaysia) Farderin Kadir (10)
2020, 2021^{1}	Cancelled due to the COVID-19 pandemic						
2024	Liga A2	Quarter-finalist	DNQ	DNQ	DNQ	DNQ	(Malaysia) Shamerul Abd Aziz (8)

== Players ==
As of 17 July 2024

Note: Flags indicate national team as defined under FIFA eligibility rules; some limited exceptions apply. Players may hold more than one non-FIFA nationality.

No.	Pos.	Nation	Player
1	GK	MAS	Syafiq Mokhtar
3	DF	MAS	Shahrul Azhar
4	DF	MAS	Mohd Ikhmal Roslan
5	DF	MAS	Al-Hafiz Alwi
6	DF	MAS	Adib Aiman
7	DF	MAS	Syafiq Samad (captain)
8	MF	MAS	Ahmad Fahmy Yahya
9	FW	MAS	Shamerul Abd Aziz
10	FW	MAS	Zamree Jani
12	FW	MAS	Azfar Salehudin
13	DF	MAS	Hakimi Helmi
14	MF	MAS	Nazmee Ari

No.	Pos.	Nation	Player
15	MF	MAS	Iskandar Hanapiah
16	MF	MAS	Ahmad Khusaini Piee
17	DF	MAS	Syafiq Idris
18	MF	MAS	Rais Rahim
19	GK	MAS	Ezrie Haikal Azri
20	FW	MAS	Aqil Hazwan
21	MF	MAS	Syakir Baba
22	GK	MAS	Fahmie Hanapiah
23	MF	MAS	Awang Ku Mohd Hamirullizam
24	DF	MAS	Wan Zulfahmi
25	DF	MAS	Wan Muhammad Aiman Adham
26	MF	MAS	Muhammad Nazirul
30	FW	MAS	Muhammad Arif Hafiz

== Coaches ==
Period	Name	Nationality
January 2014–October 2016	Remeli Junit	Malaysia
November 2016–October 2017	G. Torayraju	Malaysia
January 2018–December 2019	Hamdan Mohamad	Malaysia
January 2020	Mohd Azizan Baba	Malaysia
May–November 2024	Rahim Abu Bakar	Malaysia

== Management team ==
=== Club personnel ===
Position	Name
Team manager	(Malaysia) Fairullizam Isahak
Assistant manager	(Malaysia) Saiful Bakhtiar Bin Samsuri
Head coach	(Malaysia) Rahim Abu Bakar
Assistant coach	(Malaysia) Mohd Saiful Mustafa, Hafizuddin Said
Goalkeeper coach	(Malaysia) Zaidi Hassan
Assistant GK coach	(Malaysia) Mohd Rizal Ibrahim
Fitness coach	(Malaysia) Fauzi Mokhtar
Physio	(Malaysia) Najmi Hashim
Kit manager	(Malaysia) Nurhadisham Mehat
Media officer	(Malaysia) Noor Azhar Bin Tahir

== Honours ==
=== League ===
Melaka League

- Division 1
  - (gold) Winners (5): 2011, 2012, 2013, 2015, 2018

Kuala Lumpur League

- Division 1
  - (gold) Winners (1): 2014
