= 2022 Piala Emas Raja–Raja =

Piala Emas Raja-Raja

Tournament details
- Host country: Malaysia
- Dates: 1 Oct–12 November 2022
- Teams: Malaysia; 16 (from 1 association)
- Venue: 4 (in 4 host cities)

The 2022 Piala Emas Raja–Raja, also known as the 2022 Piala Emas Raja–Raja in Malay, was a football tournament held from 1 October to 12 November 2022 at four different host venues namely Perlis, Kelantan, Johor and Selangor in Malaysia. Majlis Sukan India Malaysia (MISC) were the defending champions.

The Piala Emas Raja–Raja is one of the oldest and most prestigious tournaments in the world, with its first edition dating back to 1922. His Royal Highness the Regent of England Prince of Wales visited the East and this tournament was held in celebration in Singapore by Malaya's national footballing body Football Association of Malaysia.

== Teams ==
The participating teams usually include representatives of the state teams of Malaysia. Sixteen teams will compete for the trophy in this edition.

The sixteen teams are divided into a groups of four, and they will play in a single round-robin format. The top two teams of each group will advance into the knockout stage which will be played in a single elimination format.

- (Kuala Lumpur) Kelab Kilat TNB
- Malacca
- Negeri Sembilan
- Angkatan Tentara Malaysia
- Terengganu Jakim FC
- Kelantan
- Pahang
- Bomba Malaysia
- Selangor
- Kedah
- (Malaysia) MySPRM-ACeIO
- Kuala Lumpur
- (Malaysia) PDRM
- Perak
- Perlis
- Kedah
- Penang

== Venues ==
City	Stadium	Capacity
(Malacca) Melaka	Hang Tuah Stadium	15,000
Kuala Lumpur	Kuala Lumpur Stadium	18,000
(Kelantan) Kota Bharu	Sultan Muhammad IV Stadium	33,000
(Negeri Sembilan) Nilai	USIM Stadium	1,000
Kuala Lumpur	PULAPOL Football Field	500
(Perak) Ipoh	PCRC Football Field	500
(Kedah) Sintok	UUM Mini Stadium	5,000

== Round and draw dates ==
Phase	Round	Draw date	First leg	Second leg
Group stage	Matchday 1	18 September 2022 (Kuala Lumpur)	1–2 October 2022	
Group stage	Matchday 2	18 September 2022 (Kuala Lumpur)	8–9 October 2022	
Group stage	Matchday 3	18 September 2022 (Kuala Lumpur)	15–16 October 2022	
Knockout phase	Quarter-finals	18 September 2022 (Kuala Lumpur)	October 2022	October 2022
Knockout phase	Semi-finals	18 September 2022 (Kuala Lumpur)	October 2022	October 2022
Knockout phase	Final	18 September 2022 (Kuala Lumpur)	November 2022 at	

== Group stage ==
=== Group A ===
Team	Pld	W	D	L	GF	GA	GD	Pts	MEL	ATM	NEG	TNB
Malacca	3	2	0	1	6	5	+1	6		1–2	2–1	3–2
ATM	3	1	2	0	4	3	+1	5	2–1		2–2	0–0
Negeri Sembilan	3	1	1	1	4	4	0	4	1–2	2–2		1–0
(Kuala Lumpur) Kelab Kilat TNB	3	0	1	2	2	4	−2	1	2–3	0–0	0–1	

Updated to match(es) played on 15 October 2022. Source:
Rules for classification: 1) points; 2) goal difference; 3) number of goals scored.
1 October 2022
16:15 UTC+8

Kelab Kilat TNB (Kuala Lumpur)	0–1	Negeri Sembilan

Padang TNB, Bangsar

1 October 2022
16:15 UTC+8

Malacca	1–2	ATM
Muhammad Shamerul 52(P)'		Mohd Norfazli 22'; Mohd Khairul Iqmal 77'

Hang Tuah Stadium, Melaka

8 October 2022
16:15 UTC+8

Kelab Kilat TNB (Kuala Lumpur)	2–3	Malacca
Muhammad Firdaus 12'; Muhammad Akimie 81'		Muhammad Shamerul 27(P),(39), (83)'

UNITEN Mini Stadium, Kajang

8 October 2022
16:15 UTC+8

Negeri Sembilan	2–2	ATM

Tampin Mini Stadium, Tampin

15 October 2022
16:15 UTC+8

Malacca	2–1	Negeri Sembilan
Muhammad Shamerul 22'; Hafiz Jaafar 65'		Mohd Mutadza 45+2'

Hang Tuah Stadium, Melaka

15 October 2022
16:15 UTC+8

ATM	0–0	(Kuala Lumpur) Kelab Kilat TNB

MINDEF Mini Stadium, Kuala Lumpur

=== Group B ===
Team	Pld	W	D	L	GF	GA	GD	Pts	KEL	BOM	PAH	TER
Kelantan	3	2	0	1	4	3	+1	6		2–1	0–2	2–0
Bomba Malaysia	3	2	0	1	4	3	+1	6	1–2		2–1	1–0
Pahang	3	1	0	2	4	6	−2	3	2–0	1–2		1–4
Terengganu Jakim FC	3	1	0	2	4	4	0	3	0–2	0–1	4–1	

Updated to match(es) played on 15 October 2022. Source:
Rules for classification: 1) points; 2) goal difference; 3) number of goals scored.
1 October 2022
16:15 UTC+8

Bomba Malaysia	2–1	Pahang

Kuala Lumpur Stadium, Cheras

1 October 2022
16:15 UTC+8

Kelantan	2–0	Terengganu Jakim FC

Sultan Muhammad IV Stadium, Kota Bharu

8 October 2022
16:15 UTC+8

Terengganu Jakim FC	0–1	Bomba Malaysia

Sultan Ismail Nasiruddin Shah, Kuala Terengganu

9 October 2022
16:15 UTC+8

Pahang	2–0	Kelantan

AMD Mini Stadium, Gambang

15 October 2022
16:15 UTC+8

Kelantan	2–1	Bomba Malaysia

Sultan Muhammad IV Stadium, Kota Bharu

15 October 2022
16:15 UTC+8

Terengganu Jakim FC	4–1	Pahang

UNITEN Mini Stadium, Kajang

=== Group C ===
Team	Pld	W	D	L	GF	GA	GD	Pts	SEL	PDR	KLU	SPR
Selangor	3	2	1	0	7	3	+4	7		2–1	0–0	5–2
PDRM	3	2	0	1	5	2	+3	6	1–2		1–0	3–0
Kuala Lumpur	3	1	1	1	3	3	0	4	0–0	0–1		3–2
(Malaysia) MySPRM-ACeIO	3	0	0	3	4	11	−7	0	2–5	0–3	2–3	

Updated to match(es) played on 15 October 2022. Source:
Rules for classification: 1) points; 2) goal difference; 3) number of goals scored.
1 October 2022
16:15 UTC+8

MySPRM-ACeIO (Malaysia)	2–5	Selangor

USIM Stadium, Nilai

1 October 2022
16:15 UTC+8

PDRM	1–0	Kuala Lumpur

Padang PULAPOL, Kuala Lumpur

8 October 2022
16:15 UTC+8

MySPRM-ACeIO (Malaysia)	0–3	PDRM

USIM Stadium, Nilai

8 October 2022
16:15 UTC+8

Selangor	0–0	Kuala Lumpur

UPM Stadium, Serdang

15 October 2022
16:15 UTC+8

PDRM	1–2	Selangor

Padang PULAPOL, Kuala Lumpur

15 October 2022
16:15 UTC+8

Kuala Lumpur	3–2	(Malaysia) MySPRM-ACeIO

Kuala Lumpur Stadium, Cheras, Kuala Lumpur

=== Group D ===
Team	Pld	W	D	L	GF	GA	GD	Pts	PEL	PEN	PRK	KED
Perlis	3	1	2	0	4	3	+1	5		1–0	0–0	3–3
Penang	3	1	1	1	3	2	+1	4	0–1		2–0	1–1
Perak	3	1	1	1	3	2	+1	4	0–0	0–2		3–0
Kedah	3	0	2	1	4	7	−3	2	3–3	1–1	0–3	

Updated to match(es) played on 16 October 2022. Source:
Rules for classification: 1) points; 2) goal difference; 3) number of goals scored.
1 October 2022
16:30 UTC+8

Perak	0–0	Perlis

Padang PCRC, Ipoh

2 October 2022
20:30 UTC+8

Kedah	1–1	Penang

UUM Stadium, Sintok

8 October 2022
16:15 UTC+8

Perak	3–0	Kedah

Padang PCRC, Ipoh

8 October 2022
20:30 UTC+8

Perlis	1–0	Penang

Tuanku Syed Putra Stadium, Kangar

16 October 2022
16:15 UTC+8

Penang	2–0	Perak

City Stadium, Penang, George Town

16 October 2022
20:30 UTC+8

Kedah	3–3	Perlis

UUM Stadium, Sintok

== Knock-out stage ==
Quarterfinals
Malacca	4
Bomba Malaysia	2
Perlis	1
PDRM	4
Kelantan	3
ATM	2
Selangor	1
Penang	0

Semifinals
Malacca	1
PDRM	3
Kelantan	2 (2)
Selangor	2 (4)

Final
PDRM	2
Selangor	3

=== Quarter-finals ===
22 October 2022
16:00 UTC+8

Kelantan	3–2	ATM
Ahmad Dzikri 12'; Mohd Sazrin 45'; Mohd Fakrul Rozi 73'		Mohd Khairul Ikmar 6'; Mohd Nor Fazli 90'

Sultan Muhammad IV Stadium, Kota Bharu

22 October 2022
16:00 UTC+8

Selangor	1–0	Penang
Alif Daniel 9'

MINDEF Stadium, Kuala Lumpur

22 October 2022
20:45 UTC+8

Perlis	1–4	PDRM
Nashrul Shazrin 77'		Ahmad Farhan (o.g.) 37'; Razis Rasid (o.g.) 48'; Muhammad Muiz (o.g.) 70'; M. Akif Iqraiz 73'

Tuanku Syed Putra Stadium, Kangar

23 October 2022
20:30 UTC+8

Malacca	4–2	Bomba Malaysia
Mohd Hafiz Jaafar 20'; Mohd Izad 45+1'; Mohd Azizan Abd Kadir 52'; Mohd Hakimi 59'		Mohd Syakimi 10' Adam Mohd Nazrul 90'

UTeM Stadium, Melaka

=== Semi-finals ===
29 October 2022
20:15 UTC+8

Malacca	1 – 3	PDRM

Hang Jebat Stadium, Paya Rumput

29 October 2022
20:15 UTC+8

Kelantan	2 – 2	Selangor
Penalties
	2 – 4

Sultan Muhammad IV Stadium, Kota Bharu

=== Finals ===
12 November 2022
--:-- UTC+8

PDRM	2 – 3	Selangor

Petaling Jaya Stadium, Petaling Jaya

== Winners ==
Champions of 2022 Piala Emas Raja–Raja
(Selangor)
Selangor
14th Title
