= 2023 Piala Emas Raja–Raja =

Piala Emas Raja-Raja

Tournament details
- Host country: Malaysia
- Dates: 1 Oct–12 November 2023
- Teams: Malaysia; 16 (from 1 association)
- Venue: 4 (in 4 host cities)

The 2023 Piala Emas Raja–Raja, also known as the 2023 Piala Emas Raja–Raja in Malay, was a football tournament held from 27 October to 12 November 2023 at four different host venues namely Perlis, Kelantan, Johor and Selangor in Malaysia. Selangor were the defending champions.

The Piala Emas Raja–Raja is one of the oldest and most prestigious tournaments in the world, with its first edition dating back to 1922. His Royal Highness the Regent of England Prince of Wales visited the East and this tournament was held in celebration in Singapore by Malaya's national footballing body Football Association of Malaysia.

== Teams ==
The participating teams usually include representatives of the state teams of Malaysia. Sixteen teams will compete for the trophy in this edition.

The sixteen teams are divided into a groups of four, and they will play in a single round-robin format. The top two teams of each group will advance into the knockout stage which will be played in a single elimination format.

- Kuala Lumpur
- Pahang
- Terengganu FA
- (Malaysia) PDRM
- Penang
- (Malaysia) MySPRM-ACeIO
- Bomba Malaysia
- Kedah
- Selangor
- Perak
- Perlis
- Kelantan
- Malacca
- Angkatan Tentera Malaysia
- (Putrajaya) JAKIM

== Venues ==
| City | Stadium | Capacity |
|---|---|---|
| Bangi, Selangor | UKM Bangi Stadium | 500 |
| (Kelantan) Kota Bharu | Sultan Muhammad IV Stadium | 33,000 |
| George Town, Penang | USM Football Field | 500 |
| (Kedah) Alor Setar & Jitra | Jitra Mini Stadium; MADA Ampang Jajar Football Field | 500 |

== Round and draw dates ==
| Phase | Round | Draw date | First leg | Second leg |
|---|---|---|---|---|
| Group stage | Matchday 1 | 22 July 2023 (Kuala Lumpur) | 23 & 27 October 2023 | |
| Group stage | Matchday 2 | 22 July 2023 (Kuala Lumpur) | 24 & 28 October 2023 | |
| Group stage | Matchday 3 | 22 July 2023 (Kuala Lumpur) | 25 & 29 October 2023 | |
| Knockout phase | Quarter-finals | 22 July 2023 (Kuala Lumpur) | 4 November 2023 | 11 November 2023 |
| Knockout phase | Semi-finals | 22 July 2023 (Kuala Lumpur) | November 2023 | November 2023 |
| Knockout phase | Final | 22 July 2023 (Kuala Lumpur) | November 2023 at | |

== Group stage ==
=== Group A ===
| Team | Pld | W | D | L | GF | GA | GD | Pts | PHG | TER | KLU | PDR |
|---|---|---|---|---|---|---|---|---|---|---|---|---|
| Pahang | 3 | 3 | 0 | 0 | 7 | 1 | +6 | 9 | | 2–0 | 2–0 | 3–1 |
| Terengganu FA | 3 | 2 | 0 | 1 | 5 | 3 | +2 | 6 | 0–2 | | 3–1 | 2–0 |
| Kuala Lumpur | 3 | 1 | 0 | 2 | 4 | 7 | −3 | 3 | 0–2 | 1–3 | | 3–2 |
| (Malaysia) PDRM | 3 | 0 | 0 | 3 | 3 | 8 | −5 | 0 | 1–3 | 0–2 | 2–3 | |

Updated to match(es) played on 29 October 2023. Source: https://web.facebook.com/PersatuanBolasepakMelayuMalaysia
Rules for classification: 1) points; 2) goal difference; 3) number of goals scored.
27 October 2023
16:30 UTC+8

| Kuala Lumpur | 0−2 | Pahang |

UKM Bangi Stadium, Bangi, Selangor

27 October 2023
16:30 UTC+8

| Terengganu FA | 2−0 | PDRM |

Padang B UKM Bangi, Bangi, Selangor

28 October 2023
16:30 UTC+8

| Kuala Lumpur | 1−3 | Terengganu FA |

UKM Bangi Stadium, Bangi, Selangor

28 October 2023
16:30 UTC+8

| Pahang | 3−1 | PDRM |

Padang B UKM Bangi, Bangi, Selangor

29 October 2023
16:30 UTC+8

| PDRM | 2−3 | Kuala Lumpur |

UKM Bangi Stadium, Bangi, Selangor

29 October 2023
16:30 UTC+8

| Terengganu FA | 0−2 | Pahang |

Padang B UKM Bangi, Bangi, Selangor

=== Group B ===
| Team | Pld | W | D | L | GF | GA | GD | Pts | PEN | BOM | SPR |
|---|---|---|---|---|---|---|---|---|---|---|---|
| Penang | 2 | 1 | 1 | 0 | 3 | 0 | +3 | 4 | | 0–0 | 3–0 |
| Bomba Malaysia | 2 | 1 | 1 | 0 | 2 | 0 | +2 | 4 | 0–0 | | 2–0 |
| (Malaysia) MySPRM-ACeIO | 2 | 0 | 0 | 2 | 0 | 5 | −5 | 0 | 0–3 | 0–2 | |

Updated to match(es) played on 29 October 2023. Source: https://web.facebook.com/PersatuanBolasepakMelayuMalaysia
Rules for classification: 1) points; 2) goal difference; 3) number of goals scored.
27 October 2023
16:30 UTC+8

| Penang | 3−0 | (Malaysia) MySPRM-ACeIO |

USM Football Field

28 October 2023
16:30 UTC+8

| MySPRM-ACeIO (Malaysia) | 0−2 | Bomba Malaysia |

USM Football Field

29 October 2023
16:30 UTC+8

| Bomba Malaysia | 0−0 | Penang |

USM Football Field

=== Group C ===
| Team | Pld | W | D | L | GF | GA | GD | Pts | KED | SEL | PRK | PEL |
|---|---|---|---|---|---|---|---|---|---|---|---|---|
| Kedah | 3 | 2 | 0 | 1 | 4 | 2 | +2 | 6 | | 2–0 | 2–1 | 0–1 |
| Selangor | 3 | 2 | 0 | 1 | 4 | 3 | +1 | 6 | 0–2 | | 1–0 | 3–1 |
| Perak | 3 | 1 | 0 | 2 | 3 | 3 | 0 | 3 | 1–2 | 0–1 | | 2–0 |
| Perlis | 3 | 1 | 0 | 2 | 2 | 5 | −3 | 3 | 1–0 | 1–3 | 0–2 | |

Updated to match(es) played on 29 October 2023. Source: https://web.facebook.com/PersatuanBolasepakMelayuMalaysia
Rules for classification: 1) points; 2) goal difference; 3) number of goals scored.
27 October 2023
16:30 UTC+8

| Kedah | 2−0 | Selangor |
|---|---|---|
| Al Amin 2'; Syamim 90+6' |

Jitra Mini Stadium, Jitra

27 October 2023
16:30 UTC+8

| Perak | 2−0 | Perlis |

MADA Ampang Jajar Football Field, Alor Setar

28 October 2023
16:30 UTC+8

| Kedah | 2−1 | Perak |

Jitra Mini Stadium, Jitra

28 October 2023
16:30 UTC+8

| Selangor | 3−1 | Perlis |

MADA Ampang Jajar Football Field, Alor Setar

29 October 2023
16:30 UTC+8

| Perak | 0−1 | Selangor |

Jitra Mini Stadium, Jitra

29 October 2023
16:30 UTC+8

| Perlis | 1−0 | Kedah |

MADA Ampang Jajar Football Field, Alor Setar

=== Group D ===
| Team | Pld | W | D | L | GF | GA | GD | Pts | KEL | MEL | ATM | JAK |
|---|---|---|---|---|---|---|---|---|---|---|---|---|
| Kelantan | 3 | 2 | 1 | 0 | 7 | 1 | +6 | 7 | | 1–1 | 4–0 | 2–0 |
| (Malacca) Melaka | 3 | 1 | 2 | 0 | 4 | 3 | +1 | 5 | 1–1 | | 1–0 | 2–2 |
| ATM | 3 | 1 | 0 | 2 | 1 | 5 | −4 | 3 | 0–4 | 0–1 | | 1–0 |
| (Putrajaya) JAKIM | 3 | 0 | 1 | 2 | 2 | 5 | −3 | 1 | 0–2 | 2–2 | 0–1 | |

Updated to match(es) played on 25 October 2023. Source: https://web.facebook.com/PersatuanBolasepakMelayuMalaysia
Rules for classification: 1) points; 2) goal difference; 3) number of goals scored.
23 October 2023
19:45 UTC+8

| ATM | 1−0 | (Putrajaya) JAKIM |
|---|---|---|
| Yaa Omar 45' |

Sultan Muhammad IV Stadium

23 October 2023
21:45 UTC+8

| Kelantan | 1−1 | (Malacca) Melaka |
|---|---|---|
| Aiman Yusof 2' | | Wan Zulfahmi 63' |

Sultan Muhammad IV Stadium

24 October 2023
19:45 UTC+8

| Kelantan | 2−0 | (Putrajaya) JAKIM |
|---|---|---|
| Ikmal Izzudin 57'; Airen Adam 89' |

Sultan Muhammad IV Stadium

24 October 2023
21:45 UTC+8

| Melaka (Malacca) | 1−0 | ATM |
|---|---|---|
| Hakimi 79' |

Sultan Muhammad IV Stadium

25 October 2023
19:45 UTC+8

| JAKIM (Putrajaya) | 2−2 | (Malacca) Melaka |

Sultan Muhammad IV Stadium

25 October 2023
21:45 UTC+8

| Kelantan | 4−0 | ATM |
|---|---|---|
| Hakim Baihaqi 5'; Muhammad Aiman 74'; Zulhisyam 80'; Mukhriz Nekmat 85' |

Sultan Muhammad IV Stadium

== Knock-out stage ==
Quarterfinals
Pahang | 1 | 3 | 4
Bomba Malaysia | 0 | 2 | 2
Kelantan | 0 | 0 | 0
Selangor | 0 | 2 | 2
Penang | 2 | 2 | 4(2)
Terengganu FA | 2 | 2 | 4(4)
Kedah | 0 | 1 | 1(5)
(Malacca) Melaka | 0 | 1 | 1(4)

Semifinals
Pahang | 0 | 2 | 2(4)
Selangor | 2 | 0 | 2(2)
Terengganu FA | 1 | 2 | 3
Kedah | 0 | 1 | 1

Final
Pahang | 4
Terengganu FA | 1

=== Quarter-finals ===
==== First leg ====
4 November 2023
16:15 UTC+8

| Penang | 2−2 | Terengganu FA |

USM A Football Field, Gelugor

4 November 2023
16:15 UTC+8

| Kedah | 0−0 | (Malacca) Melaka |

Majlis Perbandaran Kubang Pasu Mini Stadium, Kubang Pasu

6 November 2023
16:15 UTC+8

| Pahang | 1−0 | Bomba Malaysia |

Darul Makmur Stadium, Kuantan

6 November 2023
16:15 UTC+8

| Kelantan | 0−0 | Selangor |

Sultan Muhammad IV Stadium, Kota Bharu

==== Second leg ====
11 November 2023
16:00 UTC+8

| Bomba Malaysia | 2−3 | Pahang |

UPM Stadium, Serdang

11 November 2023
16:00 UTC+8

| Selangor | 2−0 | Kelantan |

UiTM Stadium, Shah Alam

11 November 2023
20:15 UTC+8

| Melaka (Malacca) | 1−1 (a.e.t.) | Kedah |
Penalties
| | 4−5 |

UTeM Stadium, Melaka

11 November 2023
20:30 UTC+8

| Terengganu FA | 2−2 (a.e.t.) | Penang |
Penalties
| | 4−2 |

Sultan Ismail Nasiruddin Shah Stadium, Kuala Terengganu

=== Semi-finals ===
==== First leg ====
20 November 2023
20:30 UTC+8

| Terengganu FA | 1−0 | Kedah |

Sultan Ismail Nasiruddin Shah Stadium, Kuala Terengganu

21 November 2023
16:00 UTC+8

| Pahang | 0−2 | Selangor |

Akademi Bolasepak Negara Mokhtar Dahari, Gambang, Pahang

==== Second leg ====
25 November 2023
16:00 UTC+8

| Kedah | 1−2 | Terengganu FA |

Majlis Perbandaran Kubang Pasu Mini Stadium, Kubang Pasu

25 November 2023
20:30 UTC+8

| Selangor | 0−2 (a.e.t.) | Pahang |
Penalties
| | 2−4 |

UiTM Stadium, Shah Alam

=== Finals ===
10 December 2023
20:30 UTC+8

| Pahang | 4-1 | Terengganu FA |

Darul Makmur Stadium, Kuantan

== Winners ==
Champions of 2023 Piala Emas Raja–Raja
(Pahang)
Pahang
5th title
