= 2025 Piala Emas Raja–Raja =

Piala Emas Raja-Raja

Tournament details
- Host country: Malaysia
- Dates: 10 October – 15 November 2025
- Teams: Malaysia; 14 (from 1 association)
- Venues: 3 (in 3 host cities)

Final positions
- Champions: Kuala Lumpur (2nd title)
- Runners-up: ATM

The 2025 Piala Emas Raja–Raja, also known as the 2025 Piala Emas Raja–Raja in Malay, was a football tournament held from 10 October to 15 November 2025. Penang and Kedah will host the 103rd Piala Emas Raja–Raja Tournament involving 14 teams competing in this season.

The Piala Emas Raja–Raja is one of the oldest and most prestigious tournaments in the world, with its first edition dating back to 1922. His Royal Highness the Regent of England Prince of Wales visited the East and this tournament was held in celebration in Singapore by Malaya's national footballing body Football Association of Malaysia.

MySPRM-ACeIO are the defending champions, having beaten BOMBA Malaysia 2–1 in the previous season's final.

== Teams ==
The participating teams usually include representatives of the state teams of Malaysia. Fourteen teams will compete for the trophy in this edition.

The fourteen teams are divided into a groups of four, and they will play in a single round-robin format. The top two teams of each group will advance into the knockout stage which will be played in a single elimination format.

- ATM
- Bomba Malaysia
- Kedah
- Kelantan
- Kuala Lumpur
- (Malacca) Melaka
- Negeri Sembilan
- Pahang
- Penang
- Perak
- Perlis
- (Malaysia) PDRM
- Selangor
- Terengganu

== Venues ==
| Location | Stadium | Capacity |
|---|---|---|
| George Town, Penang | USM Turf | 1,000 |
| (Kedah) Jitra | MPKP Mini Stadium | 1,000 |
| (Kedah) Sintok | UUM Stadium | 1,000 |

== Round and draw dates ==
| Phase | Round | Draw date | Match Date |
|---|---|---|---|
| Group stage | Matchday 1 | 9 October 2025 | 10 October 2025 |
| Group stage | Matchday 2 | 9 October 2025 | 11 October 2025 |
| Group stage | Matchday 3 | 9 October 2025 | 12 October 2025 |
| Knockout phase | Quarter-finals | 9 October 2025 | 18 – 25 October 2025 |
| Knockout phase | Semi-finals | 9 October 2025 | 1 – 8 November 2025 |
| Knockout phase | Final | 9 October 2025 | 15 November 2025 at |

== Group stage ==
=== Group A ===
| Team | Pld | W | D | L | GF | GA | GD | Pts | Promotion or qualification |
|---|---|---|---|---|---|---|---|---|---|
| Penang | 3 | 2 | 1 | 0 | 8 | 1 | +7 | 7 | Advance to Knock-out stage |
| (Malacca) Melaka | 3 | 1 | 2 | 0 | 5 | 1 | +4 | 5 | Advance to Knock-out stage |
| Pahang | 3 | 1 | 1 | 1 | 5 | 3 | +2 | 4 | |
| Perlis | 3 | 0 | 0 | 3 | 0 | 13 | −13 | 0 | |

Updated to match(es) played on 12 October 2025. Source: Persatuan Bolasepak Melayu Malaysia
Rules for classification: 1) Points; 2) Goal difference; 3) Number of goals scored.

==== Fixtures and results ====
10 October 2025
16:45 UTC+8

| Penang | 6–0 | Perlis |
|---|---|---|
| | Report |

USM Football Pitch 'A', George Town, Penang

10 October 2025
16:45 UTC+8

| Melaka | 1–1 | Pahang |
|---|---|---|
| | Report |

USM Football Pitch 'A1', George Town, Penang

11 October 2025
16:45 UTC+8

| Perlis | 0–4 | Melaka |
|---|---|---|
| | Report |

USM Football Pitch 'A1', George Town, Penang

11 October 2025
16:45 UTC+8

| Pahang | 1–2 | Penang |
|---|---|---|
| | Report |

USM Football Pitch 'A', George Town, Penang

12 October 2025
16:30 UTC+8

| Penang | 0–0 | Melaka |
|---|---|---|
| | Report |

USM Football Pitch 'A', George Town, Penang

12 October 2025
16:30 UTC+8

| Perlis | 0–3 | Pahang |
|---|---|---|
| | Report |

USM Football Pitch 'A1', George Town, Penang

=== Group B ===
| Team | Pld | W | D | L | GF | GA | GD | Pts | Promotion or qualification |
|---|---|---|---|---|---|---|---|---|---|
| Angkatan Tentera Malaysia | 2 | 1 | 1 | 0 | 1 | 0 | +1 | 4 | Advance to Knock-out stage |
| Bomba Malaysia | 2 | 1 | 1 | 0 | 1 | 0 | +1 | 4 | Advance to Knock-out stage |
| Perak | 2 | 0 | 0 | 2 | 0 | 2 | −2 | 0 | |

Updated to match(es) played on 12 October 2025. Source: Persatuan Bolasepak Melayu Malaysia
Rules for classification: 1) Points; 2) Goal difference; 3) Number of goals scored.

==== Fixtures and results ====
10 October 2025
16:45 UTC+8

| Perak | 0–1 | ATM |
|---|---|---|
| | Report |

USM Turf 'A1', George Town, Penang

11 October 2025
16:45 UTC+8

| ATM | 0–0 | BOMBA Malaysia |
|---|---|---|
| | Report |

USM Turf 'A1', George Town, Penang

12 October 2025
16:30 UTC+8

| Perak | 0–1 | BOMBA Malaysia |
|---|---|---|
| | Report |

USM Turf 'A1', George Town, Penang

=== Group C ===
| Team | Pld | W | D | L | GF | GA | GD | Pts | Promotion or qualification |
|---|---|---|---|---|---|---|---|---|---|
| Kedah | 2 | 2 | 0 | 0 | 2 | 0 | +2 | 6 | Advance to Knock-out stage |
| Kuala Lumpur | 2 | 1 | 0 | 1 | 3 | 1 | +2 | 3 | Advance to Knock-out stage |
| Negeri Sembilan | 2 | 0 | 0 | 2 | 0 | 4 | −4 | 0 | |

Updated to match(es) played on 12 October 2025. Source: Persatuan Bolasepak Melayu Malaysia
Rules for classification: 1) Points; 2) Goal difference; 3) Number of goals scored.

==== Fixtures and results ====
10 October 2025
16:45 UTC+8

| Kedah | 1–0 | Kuala Lumpur |
|---|---|---|
| | Report |

MPKP Mini Stadium, Jitra

11 October 2025
16:45 UTC+8

| Negeri Sembilan | 0–3 | Kuala Lumpur |
|---|---|---|
| | Report |

MPKP Mini Stadium, Jitra

12 October 2025
20:30 UTC+8

| Kedah | 1–0 | Negeri Sembilan |
|---|---|---|
| | Report |

MPKP Mini Stadium, Jitra

=== Group D ===
| Team | Pld | W | D | L | GF | GA | GD | Pts | Promotion or qualification |
|---|---|---|---|---|---|---|---|---|---|
| Terengganu | 3 | 2 | 0 | 1 | 2 | 1 | +1 | 6 | Advance to Knock-out stage |
| Selangor | 3 | 1 | 1 | 1 | 3 | 2 | +1 | 4 | Advance to Knock-out stage |
| (Malaysia) PDRM | 3 | 1 | 1 | 1 | 3 | 3 | 0 | 4 | |
| Kelantan | 3 | 1 | 0 | 2 | 2 | 4 | −2 | 3 | |

Updated to match(es) played on 12 October 2025. Source: Persatuan Bolasepak Melayu Malaysia
Rules for classification: 1) Points; 2) Goal difference; 3) Number of goals scored.

==== Fixtures and results ====
10 October 2025
16:45 UTC+8

| Selangor | 0–1 | Terengganu |
|---|---|---|
| | Report |

UUM Stadium, Sintok

10 October 2025
16:45 UTC+8

| Kelantan | 1–2 | PDRM |
|---|---|---|
| | Report |

UUM Football Pitch 'B', Sintok

11 October 2025
16:45 UTC+8

| Terengganu | 0–1 | Kelantan |
|---|---|---|
| | Report |

UUM Stadium, Sintok

11 October 2025
16:45 UTC+8

| PDRM | 1–1 | Selangor |
|---|---|---|
| | Report |

UUM Football Pitch 'B', Sintok

12 October 2025
16:30 UTC+8

| Selangor | 2–0 | Kelantan |
|---|---|---|
| | Report |

UUM Football Pitch 'B', Sintok

12 October 2025
16:30 UTC+8

| Terengganu | 1–0 | PDRM |
|---|---|---|
| | Report |

UUM Stadium, Sintok

== Knock-out stage Bracket ==
Quarter-finals
Penang | 2 | 1 | 3 (3)
Bomba Malaysia | 0 | 3 | 3 (1)
Terengganu | 1 | 1 | 2
Kuala Lumpur | 2 | 2 | 4
ATM | 3 | 1 | 4
(Malacca) Melaka | 0 | 0 | 0
Kedah | 3 | 0 | 3
Selangor | 2 | 4 | 6

Semi-finals
Penang | 0 | 0 | 0
Kuala Lumpur | 1 | 0 | 1
ATM | 1 | 0 | 1 (5)
Selangor | 1 | 0 | 1 (4)

Final
Kuala Lumpur | 1
ATM | 0

== Quarter-finals ==
The first legs were played on 18 and 19 October, and the second legs were played on 25 and 26 October 2025.

=== Summary ===
| Team 1 | Agg. | Team 2 | 1st leg | 2nd leg |
|---|---|---|---|---|
| Penang | 3–3(3–1) | Bomba Malaysia | 2–0 | 1–3 |
| Terengganu | 2–4 | Kuala Lumpur | 1–2 | 1–2 |
| ATM | 4–0 | (Malacca) Melaka | 3–0 | 1–0 |
| Kedah | 3–6 | Selangor | 3–2 | 0–4 |

=== Matches ===
First leg

19 October 2025
16:00 UTC+8

| Penang | 2–0 | Bomba Malaysia |
|---|---|---|
| Ahmad Azri 64'; M.Fitri 66' | Report |

City Stadium, Penang

Second leg

26 October 2025
16:00 UTC+8

| Bomba Malaysia | 3–1 | Penang |
|---|---|---|
| | Report |

UPSI Stadium, Tanjung Malim

"3–3 on aggregate. Penang won on penalty shoot-out 3–1."

First leg

19 October 2025
20:30 UTC+8

| Terengganu | 1–2 | Kuala Lumpur |
|---|---|---|
| | Report |

Sultan Mizan Zainal Abidin Stadium, Kuala Nerus

Second leg

26 October 2025
16:00 UTC+8

| Kuala Lumpur | 2–1 | Terengganu |
|---|---|---|
| | Report |

Kuala Lumpur Stadium, Cheras, Kuala Lumpur

"Kuala Lumpur won 4–2 on aggregate."

First leg

18 October 2025
16:00 UTC+8

| ATM | 3–0 | (Malacca) Melaka |
|---|---|---|
| | Report |

MINDEF Stadium, Kuala Lumpur

Second leg

25 October 2025
20:30 UTC+8

| Melaka (Malacca) | 0–1 | ATM |
|---|---|---|
| | Report |

Hang Tuah Stadium, Melaka City

"Armed Forces won 4–0 on aggregate."

First leg

18 October 2025
20:30 UTC+8

| Kedah | 3–2 | Selangor |
|---|---|---|
| Irfan Raziq 31' (o.g.); M.Fareez Amirul 57'; M.Fizky Farhan 81' | Report | 28' M.Nur Daniel; 40' (pen.) Aqil Idham |

MPKP Mini Stadium, Jitra

Second leg

25 October 2025
16:45 UTC+8

| Selangor | 4–0 | Kedah |
|---|---|---|
| | Report |

MPAJ Stadium, Ampang Jaya

"Selangor won 6–3 on aggregate."

== Semi-finals ==
The first legs were played on 1 November, and the second legs were played on 8 November 2025.

=== Summary ===
| Team 1 | Agg. | Team 2 | 1st leg | 2nd leg |
|---|---|---|---|---|
| Penang | 0–1 | Kuala Lumpur | 0–1 | 0–0 |
| ATM | 1–1(5–4) | Selangor | 0–0 | 1–1 |

=== Matches ===
First leg

1 November 2025
16:00 MYT

| Penang | 0–1 | Kuala Lumpur |
|---|---|---|
| | Report |

USM Football Pitch, Penang

Second leg

9 November 2025
20:30 MYT

| Kuala Lumpur | 0–0 | Penang |
|---|---|---|
| | Report |

Kuala Lumpur Stadium, Cheras, Kuala Lumpur

"Kuala Lumpur won 1–0 on aggregate."

First leg

1 November 2025
16:00 MYT

| ATM | 0–0 | Selangor |
|---|---|---|
| | Report |

MINDEF Stadium, Kuala Lumpur

Second leg

8 November 2025
16:00 MYT

| Selangor | 1–1 (a.e.t.) | ATM |
|---|---|---|
| | Report |
Penalties
| Adib Fariz (penalty missed); Fariz Hafiz (penalty scored); Afiq Zahris (penalty scored); Yuvaniswaren (penalty scored); Fakhrul Radzi (penalty scored); Anwar Zulkifli (penalty missed) | 4–5 | (penalty scored) Haiqal Azizi; (penalty scored) Amir Hakim; (penalty scored) Arif Aiman; (penalty missed) unknown; (penalty scored) Hakim Darus; (penalty scored) Irwan Mohd Noor |

MPAJ Stadium, Ampang Jaya

"1–1 on aggregate. ATM won on penalty shoot-out 5–4"

== Finals ==
15 November 2025
20:30 MYT

| Kuala Lumpur | 1–0 | ATM |
|---|---|---|
| Suhaimi Abu 41' | Report |

UKM Bangi Stadium, Bangi, Selangor

== Winners ==
Champions of 2025 Piala Emas Raja–Raja

Kuala Lumpur
2nd Title
