= 2024 Piala Emas Raja–Raja =

Piala Emas Raja-Raja

Tournament details
- Host country: Malaysia
- Dates: 18–27 October 2024
- Teams: Malaysia; 16 (from 1 association)
- Venues: 8 (in 1 host city)

Final positions
- Champions: MySPRM-ACeIO (1st title)
- Runners-up: Bomba Malaysia

The 2024 Piala Emas Raja–Raja, also known as the 2024 Piala Emas Raja–Raja in Malay, was a football tournament held from 18 October to 27 October 2024. Melaka will host the 102nd Piala Emas Raja–Raja Tournament involving 16 teams competing in a two-week carnival.

The Piala Emas Raja–Raja is one of the oldest and most prestigious tournaments in the world, with its first edition dating back to 1922. His Royal Highness the Regent of England Prince of Wales visited the East and this tournament was held in celebration in Singapore by Malaya's national footballing body Football Association of Malaysia.

Pahang are the defending champions, having beaten Terengganu FA 4–1 in the previous season's final.

== Teams ==
The participating teams usually include representatives of the state teams of Malaysia. Sixteen teams will compete for the trophy in this edition.

The sixteen teams are divided into a groups of four, and they will play in a single round-robin format. The top two teams of each group will advance into the knockout stage which will be played in a single elimination format.

- (Malaysia) AMD
- ATM
- Bomba Malaysia
- Kedah
- Kelantan
- Kuala Lumpur
- (Malacca) Melaka
- Negeri Sembilan
- Pahang
- Penang
- Perak
- Perlis
- Selangor
- (Malaysia) MySPRM-ACeIO
- (Malacca) SSN Melaka
- Terengganu

== Venues ==
Location	Stadium	Capacity
(Malacca) Melaka City	Hang Tuah Stadium	15,000
(Malacca) Semabok	Tun Fatimah Stadium	1,000
(Malacca) Bachang	SMK Tun Tuah field	500
(Malacca) Telok Mas	Henry Gurney School football field	500
(Malacca) Bukit Katil	Drago Arena	500
(Malacca) Melaka City	SSN Seri Kota Football Field	500
(Malacca) Alor Gajah	KRM Alor Gajah Football Field	500
(Malacca) Alor Gajah	UiTM Lendu Football Field	500

== Round and draw dates ==
Phase	Round	Draw date	Match Date
Group stage	Matchday 1	11 August 2024 (Paya Rumput)	20 October 2024
Group stage	Matchday 2	11 August 2024 (Paya Rumput)	21 October 2024
Group stage	Matchday 3	11 August 2024 (Paya Rumput)	22 October 2024
Knockout phase	Quarter-finals	11 August 2024 (Paya Rumput)	24 October 2024
Knockout phase	Semi-finals	11 August 2024 (Paya Rumput)	25 October 2024
Knockout phase	Final	11 August 2024 (Paya Rumput)	27 October 2024 at Hang Jebat Stadium

== Group stage ==
=== Group A ===
Team	Pld	W	D	L	GF	GA	GD	Pts	KLU	MEL	PEL	PRK
Kuala Lumpur	3	2	1	0	4	2	+2	7		1–1		2–1
(Malacca) Melaka	3	1	2	0	3	1	+2	5			2–0	
Perlis	3	1	0	2	1	3	−2	3	0–1			
Perak	3	0	1	2	1	3	−2	1		0–0	0–1	

Updated to match(es) played on 22 October 2024. Source: PBM Melaka
Legend: Blue = home team win; Yellow = draw; Red = away team win.
Rules for classification: 1) points; 2) goal difference; 3) number of goals scored.
20 October 2024
16:30 UTC+8

Kuala Lumpur	2–1	Perak
	Report

SMK Tun Tuah Football Field, Bachang

20 October 2024
16:30 UTC+8

Melaka	2–0	Perlis
	Report

Hang Tuah Stadium, Melaka City

21 October 2024
16:30 UTC+8

Perak	0–1	Perlis
	Report

SMK Tun Tuah Football Field, Bachang

21 October 2024
16:30 UTC+8

Kuala Lumpur	1–1	Melaka
	Report

Hang Tuah Stadium, Melaka City

22 October 2024
16:30 UTC+8

Perak	0–0	Melaka
	Report

Hang Tuah Stadium, Melaka City

22 October 2024
16:30 UTC+8

Perlis	0–1	Kuala Lumpur
	Report

SMK Tun Tuah Football Field, Bachang

=== Group B ===
Team	Pld	W	D	L	GF	GA	GD	Pts	TER	NEG	SEL	KED
Terengganu	3	2	1	0	3	1	+2	7		1–1		1–0
Negeri Sembilan	3	1	2	0	2	1	+1	5			1–0	
Selangor	3	1	0	2	4	2	+2	3	0–1			4–0
Kedah	3	0	1	2	0	5	−5	1		0–0		

Updated to match(es) played on 22 October 2024. Source: PBM Melaka
Legend: Blue = home team win; Yellow = draw; Red = away team win.
Rules for classification: 1) points; 2) goal difference; 3) number of goals scored.
20 October 2024
16:30 UTC+8

Selangor	0−1	Terengganu
	Report

Tun Fatimah Stadium, Semabok

20 October 2024
16:30 UTC+8

Kedah	0−0	Negeri Sembilan
	Report

Henry Gurney School Football Field, Telok Mas

21 October 2024
16:30 UTC+8

Terengganu	1–1	Negeri Sembilan
	Report

Tun Fatimah Stadium, Semabok

21 October 2024
16:30 UTC+8

Selangor	4–0	Kedah
	Report

Henry Gurney School Football Field, Telok Mas

22 October 2024
16:30 UTC+8

Terengganu	1–0	Kedah
	Report

Tun Fatimah Stadium, Semabok

22 October 2024
16:30 UTC+8

Negeri Sembilan	1–0	Selangor
	Report

Henry Gurney School Football Field, Telok Mas

=== Group C ===
Team	Pld	W	D	L	GF	GA	GD	Pts	SPRM	ATM	SSN	AMD
(Malaysia) MySPRM-ACeIO	3	2	0	1	8	3	+5	6		1–2		
Angkatan Tentera Malaysia	3	1	1	1	3	3	0	4			0–1	1–1
(Malacca) SSN Melaka	3	1	1	1	1	2	−1	4	0–2			
(Malaysia) AMD	3	0	2	1	2	6	−4	2	1–5		0–0	

Updated to match(es) played on 22 October 2024. Source: PBM Melaka
Legend: Blue = home team win; Yellow = draw; Red = away team win.
Rules for classification: 1) points; 2) goal difference; 3) number of goals scored.
20 October 2024
16:30 UTC+8

ATM	1–1	AMD
	Report

Drago Arena Football Field, Bukit Katil

20 October 2024
16:30 UTC+8

SSN Melaka	0–2	MySPRM-ACeIO
	Report

SSN Seri Kota Football Field, Melaka City

21 October 2024
16:30 UTC+8

AMD	1–5	MySPRM-ACeIO
	Report

Drago Arena Football Field, Bukit Katil

21 October 2024
16:30 UTC+8

ATM	0–1	SSN Melaka
	Report

SSN Seri Kota Football Field, Melaka City

22 October 2024
16:30 UTC+8

AMD	0–0	SSN Melaka
	Report

Drago Arena Football Field, Bukit Katil

22 October 2024
16:30 UTC+8

MySPRM-ACeIO	1–2	ATM
	Report

SSN Seri Kota Football Field, Melaka City

=== Group D ===
Team	Pld	W	D	L	GF	GA	GD	Pts	BOM	KEL	PHG	PEN
Bomba Malaysia	3	2	1	0	4	1	+3	7		1–0		1–1
Kelantan	3	1	1	1	2	2	0	4				1–0
Pahang	3	1	1	1	3	4	−1	4	0–2	1–1		
Penang	3	0	1	2	2	4	−2	1			1–2	

Updated to match(es) played on 22 October 2024. Source: PBM Melaka
Legend: Blue = home team win; Yellow = draw; Red = away team win.
Rules for classification: 1) points; 2) goal difference; 3) number of goals scored.
20 October 2024
16:30 UTC+8

Pahang	0–2	BOMBA Malaysia
	Report

KRM Football Field, Alor Gajah

20 October 2024
16:30 UTC+8

Kelantan	1–0	Penang
	Report

UiTM Football Field, Alor Gajah

21 October 2024
16:30 UTC+8

BOMBA Malaysia	1–1	Penang
	Report

KRM Football Field, Alor Gajah

21 October 2024
16:30 UTC+8

Pahang	1–1	Kelantan
	Report

UiTM Football Field, Alor Gajah

22 October 2024
16:30 UTC+8

BOMBA Malaysia	1–0	Kelantan
	Report

KRM Football Field, Alor Gajah

22 October 2024
16:30 UTC+8

Penang	1–2	Pahang
	Report

UiTM Football Field, Alor Gajah

== Knock-out stage ==
Quarterfinals
A1	Kuala Lumpur	2
B2	Negeri Sembilan	0
D1	Bomba Malaysia	0 (5)
C2	ATM	0 (4)
B1	Terengganu	1 (3)
A2	(Malacca) Melaka	1 (4)
C1	(Malaysia) MySPRM-ACeIO	1
D2	Kelantan	0

Semifinals
Kuala Lumpur	1(0)
Bomba Malaysia	1(3)
(Malacca) Melaka	1(2)
(Malaysia) MySPRM-ACeIO	1(3)

Final
Bomba Malaysia	1
(Malaysia) MySPRM-ACeIO	2

=== Quarter-finals ===
24 October 2024
16:15 UTC+8

Kuala Lumpur	2–0	Negeri Sembilan
	Report

UiTM Lendu Football Field, Alor Gajah

24 October 2024
16:15 UTC+8

Bomba Malaysia	0–0 (a.e.t.)	ATM
	Report
Penalties
	4–5

KRM Football Field, Alor Gajah

24 October 2024
16:15 UTC+8

Terengganu	1–1 (a.e.t.)	(Malacca) Melaka
	Report
Penalties
	3–4

Hang Tuah Stadium, Melaka City

24 October 2024
16:15 UTC+8

MySPRM-ACeIO (Malaysia)	1–0	Kelantan
	Report

Tun Fatimah Stadium, Semabok

=== Semi-finals ===
25 October 2024
16:00 UTC+8

Kuala Lumpur	1–1 (a.e.t.)	Bomba Malaysia
	Report
Penalties
Penalty missed	0–3	Penalty scored

Henry Gurney School Football Field, Telok Mas

25 October 2024
16:00 UTC+8

Melaka (Malacca)	1–1 (a.e.t.)	(Malaysia) MySPRM-ACeIO
	Report
Penalties
Penalty missed Penalty scored	2–3	Penalty scored Penalty missed

Hang Tuah Stadium, Melaka City

=== Finals ===
27 October 2024
20:15 UTC+8

Bomba Malaysia	1–2	(Malaysia) MySPRM-ACeIO
Aidil Syazran 34'	report Bernama	Ahmad Basheer 63', 81' (pen.)

Hang Jebat Stadium, Krubong

== Winners ==
Champions of 2024 Piala Emas Raja–Raja
MySPRM-ACeIO
1st title
