= Piala Emas Raja-Raja =

Piala Emas Raja–Raja
- Founded: 1922; 104 years ago
- Country: Malaysia
- Confederation: AFC
- Number of clubs: 18
- Current champions: Kuala Lumpur (2025)
- Most championships: Selangor (14th title)
- Broadcaster(s): MYTV
- Current: 2026 Piala Emas Raja–Raja

Piala Emas Raja–Raja (English: Kings Gold Cup or Sultans Gold Cup) is a regional annual football competition held between the states in Malaysia. Before it was known as the Piala Emas Raja-Raja (the King's Gold Cup or Sultan's Gold Cup), the tournament was known as the Malay International Football League during its inaugural year in 1922. The competition is managed by the Malaysian Malay's Football Association.

== History ==
The competition was first held in 1922 during the visit of His Royal Highness the Prince of Wales, Prince Edward (later known as King Edward VIII), to the East, including Malaya and Singapore. Various celebrations, including the Malay International Football League sponsored by the committee of Malaya-Borneo Exhibition held for two weeks in Singapore. 10 state teams that participated were from Singapore, Johor, Malacca, Negeri Sembilan, Selangor, Perak, Kedah, Penang, Terengganu and Kelantan. Meanwhile, Pahang and Perlis did not participate. In the final, Kedah defeated Johor 2–0 to emerge as the inaugural champions of the tournament.

For the 100th year celebration (2022 Piala Emas Raja-Raja), Selangor won the competition for the 14th time after defeating PDRM by four goals to one. In 2023, Pahang became the champion of the cup after thrashing Terengganu by three goals to one in Darul Makmur Stadium, Pahang.

== Champions and finalists ==
Year	Champions	Score	Runners-up
1922	Kedah	2-0	Johor
1923	Selangor	2-0	Perak
1924	Selangor		
1925	Selangor		Perak
1926	Selangor	3-0	Negeri Sembilan
1927	Perak		
1928	Selangor		
1929	Kedah		
1930	Selangor	4-3	Perak
1931-34	no competition		
1935	Selangor	6-2	Perak
1936-37	no competition		
1938	Selangor		
1939-46	Suspended due to the World War II – Japanese occupation of Malaya, Singapore and British Borneo		
1947	Singapore	1−0	Penang
1948	Kedah	2−0	Singapore
1949	Kedah	1−0	Perak
1950	Singapore	walkover	Penang
1951	Penang	2−1	Selangor
1952	Kedah	4−1	Perak
1953	Kedah	4−1	Negeri Sembilan
1954	Selangor	6−1	Kedah
1955	Singapore	3−1	Penang
1956	Penang	3−2	Singapore
1957	Selangor	5−4	Kelantan
1958	Singapore	3−0	Penang
1959	Singapore	6−1	Kelantan
1960	Singapore	4−1	Penang
1961	Selangor	4−0	Kelantan
1962	Perak	5−4	Penang
1963	Singapore	6−3	Kelantan
1964	Singapore	2−0	Penang
1965	Johor	2−1	Penang
1966	Penang	2−1	Singapore
1967	Perlis	3−0	Singapore
1968	Penang	4−2	Selangor
1969	Penang	2−1	Johor
1970	Terengganu	3−2	Selangor
1971	ATM	3−1	Penang
1972	Kelantan	3−1	ATM
1973	Singapore	4−1	Kelantan
1974	Perak	3−2	Perlis
1975	Singapore	3−2	Penang
1976	Johor	2−1	Selangor
1977	Terengganu	2−1	Perlis
1978	Kelantan	2−1	Johor
1979	Johor	2−1	Kelantan
1980	Pahang	4−2	Perak
1981	Singapore	2−1	Johor
1982	Kelantan	1−0	Selangor
1983	Singapore	4−2	Penang
1984	ATM	5−4	Kelantan
1985	Kelantan	2−1	Johor
1986	Penang	5−0	Kuala Lumpur
1987	Terengganu	2−0	Perlis
1988	Johor	3−0	Selangor
1989	Kelantan	4−0	Selangor
1990	Perak	3−0	Kelantan
1991	Kelantan	1−0	Terengganu
1992	Negeri Sembilan	2−1	Terengganu
1993	Perlis	1−0	Penang
1994	Kuala Lumpur	2−1	Perlis
1995	Kelantan	4−0	(Malacca) Melaka
1996	Kedah	1−0	Perlis
1997	Selangor	3−1	Kelantan
1998	Penang	2–2 (5–4 pen.)	ATM
1999	ATM	3−2	(Malacca) Melaka
2000	Terengganu	3−0	Selangor
2001	Kelantan	3−0	Penang
2002	Penang	1−0	Kedah
2003	Kelantan	2−1	Selangor
2004	Kelantan	2−0	Pahang
2005	Kedah	1−0	Kelantan
2006	Selangor	5−1	ATM
2007	Johor	2−1	Kelantan
2008	Kelantan	4−0	Penang
2009	Perlis	2−0	Kedah
2010	Kelantan	0–0 (4–3 pen.)	Kedah
2011	Pahang	3−1	(Malacca) Melaka
2012	Perak	0−0 (2−0) (a.e.t.)	Kedah
2013	Perlis	0−0 (a.e.t.)(7–6 pen.)	Kedah
2014	Perlis	2−1	Pahang
2015	Negeri Sembilan	1−1 (2−1)(a.e.t.)	Perlis
2016	Pahang	6−2	(Malaysia) PDRM
2017	Penang	2−1	Kelantan
2018	Pahang	1−0	Terengganu
2019	(Malaysia) MISC	2−1	Kuala Lumpur
2020-21	cancelled due to COVID-19 pandemic		
2022	Selangor	3−2	(Malaysia) PDRM
2023	Pahang	4−1	Terengganu
2024	(Malaysia) MySPRM-ACeIO	2−1	Bomba Malaysia
2025	Kuala Lumpur	1−0	ATM
2026	Bomba Malaysia	1−1 (a.e.t.)(4–2 pen.)	Negeri Sembilan

== Performance by teams ==
Rank	Team	Winners	Runners-up
1	Selangor	14	9
2	Kelantan	12	12
3	Singapore	12	4
4	Penang	9	12
5	Kedah	8	6
6	Perlis	5	6
7	Johor	5	5
8	Perak	5	3
9	Pahang	5	2
10	Terengganu	4	4
11	ATM	3	4
12	Kuala Lumpur	2	2
13	Negeri Sembilan	2	2
14	Bomba Malaysia	1	1
15	(Malaysia) MISC	1	-
16	(Putrajaya) MySPRM-ACeIO	1	-
17	(Malacca) Melaka	-	3
18	(Malaysia) PDRM	-	2

== Corporate sponsor ==
- Malayan Agri-Horticultural Association (1926–1946)
- Puncak Niaga (2009–2010)
- Bank Mandiri (2011–2012)
- Proton (2013)
- GT Radial (2014)
- Dunia Sukan (2015)
- Petrolife Aero LNG (2022–2024)

== See also ==
- Malaysia Super League
- Malaysia Premier League
- Piala FA
- Malaysia Cup
- Piala Sumbangsih
- Football in Malaysia
