= Khairu Azrin Khazali =

Malaysian footballer

Personal information
- Full name: Muhammad Khairu Azrin bin Khazali
- Date of birth: 13 July 1991 (age 35)
- Place of birth: Selangor, Malaysia
- Height: 1.68 m (5 ft 6 in)
- Position: Midfielder

Team information
- Current team: ACEIO
- Number: 31

Youth career
- 2011: PKNS U21

Senior career*
Years	Team	Apps	(Gls)
2011–2017	PKNS	56	(5)
2017	Melaka United	12	(1)
2018	Felda United	13	(0)
2019	Terengganu	15	(0)
2020–2021	Penang	17	(0)
2022	Kedah Darul Aman	15	(0)
2023	Kelantan United	18	(0)
2024–2025	Penang	12	(0)
2025–	ACEIO		
- * Club domestic league appearances and goals

Muhammad Khairu Azrin bin Khazali (born 13 July 1991) is a Malaysian professional footballer who plays for Malaysia A2 Amateur League club ACEIO. Khairu Azrin mainly plays as a defensive midfielder.

== Club career ==
=== Melaka United ===
In November 2016, Khairu Azrin signed with 2016 Premier League champions Melaka United. On 27 January 2017, he made his debut and scored one goal for during the first league match against Selangor in Selayang Stadium. That match end up with a draw 1–1.

=== PKNS ===
In June 2017, during second window transfer, Khairu Azrin returned to PKNS after just 6 months playing for Melaka United. It was agreed that S. Sivanesan would replace him at Melaka United.

=== Felda United ===
Khairu Azrin joined Felda United F.C. for the 2018 Malaysia Premier League, and the team won the league.

=== Terengganu FC ===
In the 2019 season, Khairu Azrin joined Terengganu, alongside Syamim Yahya from Felda United.

=== Penang ===
In 2020, he moved to another Malaysia Super League club, Penang. He helped them to win the 2020 Malaysia Premier League, thus securing their promotion to the 2021 Malaysian Super League.

=== Kedah Darul Aman ===
On 1 December 2021, Khairu Azrin agreed to join Malaysia Super League side Kedah Darul Aman F.C.

=== Kelantan United FC ===
In the 2023 season, Khairu Azrin joined Kelantan United.

== Career statistics ==
As of 15 October 2022

=== Club ===
Club	Season	League		Cup		League Cup		Continental		Total	
Club	Season	Apps	Goals	Apps	Goals	Apps	Goals	Apps	Goals	Apps	Goals
Kedah Darul Aman	2022	15	0	1	0	0	0	1	0	17	0
Kedah Darul Aman	Total	15	0	1	0	0	0	1	0	17	0

== Honours ==
Penang FA

- Malaysia Premier League: 2020
