= 2013 Piala Emas Raja–Raja =

Piala Emas Raja-Raja

Tournament details
- Host country: Malaysia
- Dates: 8–11 November 2013 (group stage); 16 November – 21 December 2013 (knockout phase)
- Teams: Malaysia; Singapore; 15 (from 2 associations)
- Venue(s): 4 (in 4 host cities)

Tournament statistics
- Matches played: 33

The 2013 Piala Emas Raja–Raja, also known as the 2013 Piala Emas Raja–Raja in Malay, will be held from 8 November to 21 December 2013 at four different host venues namely Perlis, Kelantan, Johor and Selangor in Malaysia. Perak are the defending champions.

The Piala Emas Raja–Raja is one of the oldest and prestigious tournaments in the world with its first edition dating back to 1922. His Royal Highness the Regent of England Prince of Wales visited the East and this tournament was held in celebration in Singapore by Malaya's national footballing body Football Association of Malaysia.

== Teams ==
The participating teams usually include representatives of the state teams of Malaysia and neighbouring country Singapore. Fifteen teams will compete for the trophy in this edition.

The fifteen teams are divided into a group of three and three groups of four, and they will play in a single round-robin format. The top two teams of each group will advance into the knockout stage which will be played in a single elimination format.

- Angkatan Tentara Malaysia
- Johor
- Kedah
- Kelantan
- Kuala Lumpur
- (Selangor) Malaysian University Sports Council (MASUM)
- Malacca
- Negeri Sembilan
- Pahang
- Perak
- Perlis
- (Selangor) PDRM
- Selangor
- Singapore Malays
- Terengganu

Take note that Singapore Malays are not the Singapore Lions, and they do not represent the Football Association of Singapore in this tournament.

== Venues ==
City	Stadium	Capacity	Location
Perlis	Stadium Kompleks Sukan Syed Sirajuddin Areeb Putra	3,000	6.2650°N 100.1439°E
Kelantan	Sultan Mohammad IV Stadium	22,000	6.0726°N 102.1437°E
Johor	Stadium Kluang	1,000	2.0336°N 103.3194°E
Selangor	UiTM Stadium	10,000	2.2027°N 102.2454°E

== Round and draw dates ==
Phase	Round	Draw date	First leg	Second leg
Group stage	Matchday 1	26 October 2013 (Kuala Lumpur)	8–9 November 2013	
Group stage	Matchday 2	26 October 2013 (Kuala Lumpur)	9–10 November 2013	
Group stage	Matchday 3	26 October 2013 (Kuala Lumpur)	10–11 November 2013	
Knockout phase	Quarter-finals	26 October 2013 (Kuala Lumpur)	16 November 2013	23 November 2013
Knockout phase	Semi-finals	26 October 2013 (Kuala Lumpur)	30 November 2013	7 December 2013
Knockout phase	Final	26 October 2013 (Kuala Lumpur)	21 December 2013 at Shah Alam Stadium, Selangor	

== Group stage ==
Location of teams of the 2013 Piala Emas Raja–Raja group stage.
Blue: Group A; Brown: Group B; Orange: Group C; Red: Group D.

The draw for the group stage was held in Kuala Lumpur on 26 October 2013. The 15 teams were allocated into three groups of four and a group of three. A total of two football associations under one confederation are represented in the group stage.

In each group, teams will play against each other once in a single round-robin format. The matchdays were 8–9 November, 9–10 November and 10–11 November 2013. The group winners and runners-up will advance to the round of 16.

Key to colours in group tables
Group winners and runners-up advance to the round of 16
Teams that are knocked out in the group stage before all matches are played

=== Group A ===
Team	Pld	W	D	L	GF	GA	GD	Pts	SEL	PRL	MEL
Selangor	2	1	1	0	2	0	+2	4			0–0
Perlis	2	1	0	1	3	2	+1	3	0–2		
Malacca	2	0	1	1	0	3	−3	1		0–3	

Updated to match(es) played on 7 November 2013. Source:
Rules for classification: 1) points; 2) goal difference; 3) number of goals scored.
9 November 2013
16:30

Selangor	0–0	Malacca

Stadium Kluang, Kluang

10 November 2013
20:30

Malacca	0–3	Perlis
		11'; 12'; 20'

Stadium Kluang, Kluang

11 November 2013
20:30

Perlis	0–2	Selangor
		85'; 88'

Stadium Kluang, Kluang

=== Group B ===
Team	Pld	W	D	L	GF	GA	GD	Pts	PER	KUL	KEL	ATM
Perak	3	2	1	0	3	0	+3	7				2–0
Kuala Lumpur	3	2	0	1	3	1	+2	6	0–1			
Kelantan	3	1	1	1	6	1	+5	4	0–0	0–1		
ATM	3	0	0	3	0	10	−10	0		0–2	0–6	

Updated to match(es) played on 7 November 2013. Source:
Rules for classification: 1) points; 2) goal difference; 3) number of goals scored.
8 November 2013
16:30

Perak	2–0	ATM
16'; 78'

Sultan Mohammad IV Stadium, Kota Bharu

8 November 2013
20:45

Kelantan	0–1	Kuala Lumpur
(red card) 67'		34'; (red card) 70'

Sultan Mohammad IV Stadium, Kota Bharu

9 November 2013
16:30

Kuala Lumpur	0–1	Perak
		89' Hakim Isa

Sultan Mohammad IV Stadium, Kota Bharu

9 November 2013
20:30

ATM	0–6	Kelantan
		3'; 7'; 15'; 55'; 63'; 84'

Sultan Mohammad IV Stadium, Kota Bharu

10 November 2013
16:30

ATM	0–2	Kuala Lumpur
		7'; 54'

Sultan Mohammad IV Stadium, Kota Bharu

10 November 2013
20:30

Kelantan	0–0	Perak
(red card) 22'

Sultan Mohammad IV Stadium, Kota Bharu

=== Group C ===
Team	Pld	W	D	L	GF	GA	GD	Pts	TER	PAH	JHR	NSE
Terengganu	3	2	1	0	5	1	+4	7		2–1	0–0	
Pahang	3	2	0	1	9	5	+4	6				6–2
Johor	3	1	1	1	6	3	+3	4		1–2		5–1
Negeri Sembilan	3	0	0	3	3	14	−11	0	0–3			

Updated to match(es) played on 10 November 2013. Source:
Rules for classification: 1) points; 2) goal difference; 3) number of goals scored.
8 November 2013
16:30

Perak (Terengganu)	2–1	Pahang
42'; 52'		18'

Stadium Kluang, Johor

8 November 2013
20:30

Johor	5–1	Negeri Sembilan
11'; 12'; 38'; 62'; 90'		77'

Stadium Kluang, Johor

9 November 2013
16:30

Pahang	6–2	Negeri Sembilan
31'; 53'; 54'; 60'; 62'; 90'		22'; 49'

Stadium Kluang, Johor

9 November 2013
20:30

Terengganu	0–0	Johor

Stadium Kluang, Johor

10 November 2013
16:30

Negeri Sembilan	0–3	Terengganu
		68'; 75'; 90+2' (pen.)

Stadium Kluang, Johor

10 November 2013
20:30

Johor	1–2	Pahang
22' (pen.)		48'; 66'

Stadium Kluang, Johor

=== Group D ===
Team	Pld	W	D	L	GF	GA	GD	Pts	KED	SIN	PDR	UMA
Kedah	3	2	1	0	5	3	+2	7			3–2	
Singapore	3	2	0	1	4	3	+1	6	1–2			
(Selangor) PDRM	3	1	0	2	6	4	+2	3		0–1		4–0
(Selangor) MASUM	3	0	1	2	1	6	−5	1	0–0	1–2		

Updated to match(es) played on 10 November 2013. Source:
Rules for classification: 1) points; 2) goal difference; 3) number of goals scored.
8 November 2013
16:30

Kedah	3–2	(Selangor) PDRM
15'; 24'; 43'		50'; 80'

UiTM Stadium, Shah Alam

8 November 2013
20:30

MASUM (Selangor)	1–2	Singapore
62'		9'; 60'

UiTM Stadium, Shah Alam

9 November 2013
16:30

Singapore	1–2	Kedah
45' Syamin Alif; 76' Irwan Syazmin; (red card) 79'		28' Ridzuan Rumlee; (yellow card) 63' (red card) Ridzuan Rumlee

UiTM Stadium, Shah Alam

9 November 2013
20:30

PDRM (Selangor)	4–0	(Selangor) MASUM
26'; 48'; 67'; 69'

UiTM Stadium, Shah Alam

10 November 2013
16:30

PDRM (Selangor)	0–1	Singapore
		44'

UiTM Stadium, Shah Alam

10 November 2013
20:30

MASUM (Selangor)	0–0	Kedah

UiTM Stadium, Shah Alam

== Knockout phase ==
In the knockout phase, teams will play against each other over two legs on a home-and-away basis, except for the one-match final.

=== Bracket ===
Quarterfinals
A1	Selangor	1	1	2
B2	Kuala Lumpur	1	0	1
D1	Kedah	3	2	5
C2	Pahang	1	1	2
B1	Perak	0	0(5)	(5)
A2	Perlis	0	0(6)	(6)
C1	Terengganu	1	0	1
D2	Singapore	0	0	0

Semifinals
A1	Selangor	0	1	1
D1	Kedah	1	3	4
A2	Perlis	2	0	2
C1	Terengganu	1	0	1

Final
D1	Kedah
A2	Perlis

=== Quarter-finals ===
The first legs will be played on 16 November 2013, and the second legs will be played on 23 November 2013.

Team 1	Agg.	Team 2	1st leg	2nd leg
Selangor	2-1	Kuala Lumpur FA	1–1	1-0
Kedah	5–2	Pahang	3–1	2-1
Perak	(5)-(6)	Perlis	0–0	0(5)-0(6)
Terengganu FA	1–0	Singapore	1–0	0–0

First leg

16 November 2013
16:30

Selangor	1–1	Kuala Lumpur
82'		6'

16 November 2013
20:30

Kedah	3–1	Pahang
51'; 61'; 88'		90'

16 November 2013
16:30

Perak	0–0	Perlis

16 November 2013
20:30

Terengganu	1–0	Singapore
90+5'

Second leg

23 November 2013
16:30

Perlis	0(6)-0(5)	Perak

23 November 2013
20:30

Singapore	0-1	Terengganu

23 November 2013
16:30

Kuala Lumpur	0-1	Selangor

23 November 2013
20:30

Pahang	1-2	Kedah

=== Semi-finals ===
The first legs will be played on 30 November 2013, and the second legs will be played on 7 December 2013.

Team 1	Agg.	Team 2	1st leg	2nd leg
Selangor	1-4	Kedah	0-1	1–3
Perlis	2-1	Terengganu	2–1	0–0

First leg

1 December 2013
20:30

Perlis	2-1	Terengganu

Stadium Kompleks Sukan Syed Sirajuddin Areeb Putra, UniMAP Pauh Putra, Perlis

1 December 2013
20:30

Selangor	0-1	Kedah

KL Soccer Stadium Cheras

Second leg

8 December 2013
20:30

Terengganu	0-0	Perlis

Sultan Ismail Nasiruddin Shah Stadium, Kuala Terengganu

8 December 2013
20:30

Kedah	3-1	Selangor

Darul Aman Stadium, Kedah

=== Final ===
The final will be played on 29 December 2013 at Darul Aman Stadium in Kedah, Malaysia.

29 December 2013
20:45

Kedah	–	Perlis

== Winners ==
Champions of 2013 Piala Emas Raja–Raja
