= Bachang (state constituency) =

Malacca constituency

Defunct state constituency
- Legislature: Malacca State Legislative Assembly
- Constituency created: 1994
- Constituency abolished: 2018
- First contested: 1995
- Last contested: 2013

Bachang was a state constituency in Malacca, Malaysia, that has been represented in the Melaka State Legislative Assembly.

The state constituency was first contested in 1995 and is mandated to return a single Assemblyman to the Melaka State Legislative Assembly under the first-past-the-post voting system.

== History ==
Members of the Legislative Assembly for Bachang
Assembly	No	Years	Member	Party
Constituency created from Ayer Molek
9th	N15	1995 – 1999	Chua Peng Song (蔡炳松)	BN (MCA)
10th	N15	1999 – 2004	Lim Jak Wong (林敬賢)	DAP
11th	N15	2004 – 2008	Chua Peng Song (蔡炳松)	BN (GERAKAN)
12th	N15	2008 – 2013	Lim Jak Wong (林敬賢)	PR (DAP)
13th	N15	2013 – 2017	Lim Jak Wong (林敬賢)	PR (DAP)
13th	N15	2017 - 2018	Lim Jak Wong (林敬賢)	Independent
Constituency renamed to Pengkalan Batu

== Results ==
The electoral results for the Bachang state constituency in 2004, 2008 and 2013 are as follows.

Malacca state election, 2013
Party	Candidate	Votes	%	∆%
DAP	Lim Jak Wong	13,688	55.41	▲3.97
BN	Chua Lian Chye	11,016	44.59	▼3.97
Total valid votes		24,704	100.00	
Total rejected ballots		365		
Unreturned ballots		37		
Turnout		25,106	88.50	▲7.16
Registered electors		28,367		
Majority		2,672	10.82	▲7.94
DAP hold		Swing		
Source(s) "Federal Government Gazette - Notice of Contested Election, State Legislative Assembly for the State of Selangor [P.U. (B) 192/2013]" (PDF). Attorney General's Chambers of Malaysia. 26 April 2013. Archived from the original (PDF) on 29 December 2019. "Federal Government Gazette - Results of Contested Election and Statements of the Poll after the Official Addition of Votes, State Constituencies for the State of Selangor [P.U. (B) 233/2013]" (PDF). Attorney General's Chambers of Malaysia. 22 May 2013. Archived from the original (PDF) on 2 October 2018."undi.info N15 Bachang".

Malacca state election, 2008
Party	Candidate	Votes	%	∆%
DAP	Lim Jak Wong	9,237	51.44	▲14.11
BN	Wendy Ngo Kim Hua	8,720	48.56	▼14.11
Total valid votes		17,957	100.00	
Total rejected ballots		498		
Unreturned ballots		379		
Turnout		18,834	81.35	▲2.30
Registered electors		23,153		
Majority		517	2.88	▼22.47
DAP gain from BN		Swing		?
Source(s) "undi.info N15 BACHANG".

Malacca state election, 2004
Party	Candidate	Votes	%	∆%
BN	Chua Peng Song	9,901	62.67	▲12.83
DAP	Goh Leong Cheong	5,897	37.33	▼12.83
Total valid votes		15,798	100.00	
Total rejected ballots		539		
Unreturned ballots		28		
Turnout		16,365	79.05	▲1.08
Registered electors		20,702		
Majority		4,004	25.34	▲25.03
BN gain from DAP		Swing		?
Source(s) "undi.info N15 BACHANG".

Malacca state election, 1999
Party	Candidate	Votes	%
BN	Lim Jak Wong	6,583	50.15
DAP	Chua Peng Song	6,542	49.84
Total valid votes		13,125	100.00
Total rejected ballots		313	
Unreturned ballots		15	
Turnout		13,453	77.97
Registered electors		17,254	
Majority		41	0.31
This was a new constituency created.
