= Tun Tuah National Secondary School =

Malaysian secondary school

Tun Tuah National Secondary School (Malay:Sekolah Menegah Kebangsaan Tun Tuah) is a national secondary school located in Kampung Lapan, Bachang, Melaka, Malaysia.

== History ==
SMK Tun Tuah was established as an all-boys school in 1962. The school moved locations several times until it settled in its current location in Kampung Lapan, Bachang, Melaka in 1969, where it was subsequently renamed to Sekolah Menengah Bachang. On 3 November 1973, the school was officially recognised and was launched by the then Chief Minister of Melaka, Dato' Setia Abdul Ghani Ali. It was subsequently renamed to Sekolah Menengah Kebangsaan Tun Tuah, after the legendary Melaka warrior, Hang Tuah.
