= ACeIO F.C. =

Malaysian football club

ACeIO
- Full name: Association of Certified Integrity Officers Football Club
- Nickname: The Tigers
- Short name: ACEIO; ACeiO PERSAJ
- Ground: UKM Bangi Stadium, Bangi
- Capacity: 2,000
- Owner: Malaysian Anti-Corruption Commission
- Head coach: Omar Salim
- League: Malaysia A2 Amateur League
- Website: www.aceio-fc.com
Home colours	Away colours

ACeIO Football Club (also known as ACeIO FC Integrity Champion or formerly MySPRM-ACeIO) is a Malaysian football club based in Putrajaya, Federal Territories of Malaysia, owned by the Malaysian Anti-Corruption Commission (Malay: Suruhanjaya Pencegahan Rasuah Malaysia), competing in the third-tier Malaysia A2 Amateur League, the third tier of the Malaysian football league system.

== History ==
=== Origins and Early Cup Success ===
Formed to represent SPRM personnel and Certified Integrity Officers, the club initially competed as MySPRM-ACeIO in institutional and invitational tournaments. In October 2024, they claimed their breakthrough title by winning the 102nd edition of the Piala Emas Raja-Raja in Malacca, defeating Bomba FC 2–1 in the final at Hang Jebat Stadium to become only the second non-state side to win the trophy.

=== Entry into the Malaysia A2 Amateur League ===
Rebranded as ACeIO FC, the club joined the 2025–26 Malaysia A2 Amateur League following their cup triumph. They finished runners-up in the Central Zone and advanced to the national quarter-finals before exiting against AZM Rovers F.C., securing their continuation into the expanded 2026–27 Malaysia A2 Amateur League season.

== Players ==
=== First-team squad ===
As of November 2026

Note: Flags indicate national team as defined under FIFA eligibility rules; some limited exceptions apply. Players may hold more than one non-FIFA nationality.

No.	Pos.	Nation	Player
1	GK	MAS	Adika Arman
2	GK	MAS	Irfan Haikal Iffendi
3	MF	MAS	Farhat Alissan
4	MF	MAS	Aisar Fahmi Rusli
5	FW	MAS	Shahril Sobri
6	DF	MAS	Amierul Ismail
7	FW	MAS	Shahrul Ramli (captain)
8	MF	MAS	Khairu Azrin Khazali
9	MF	MAS	Ranggi Oftawan Osman
10	DF	MAS	Amirul Hakim Lailee
11	MF	MAS	Khairul Azwar Azhar
12	FW	MAS	Alifh Aiman Rosman
13	DF	MAS	Badrul Affendy Fadzli
14	MF	MAS	Fattah Azib Mohd Naim
15	DF	MAS	Muhammad Akmal Abdullah

No.	Pos.	Nation	Player
16	NF	MAS	Faiq Hakim Hamizan
17	MF	MAS	Rafiefikri Mohd Rosman
18	MF	MAS	Izzuddin Roslan
19	FW	MAS	Nor Ezawi Nor Azman
20	DF	MAS	Izzat Naim Ariffin
21	DF	MAS	Iman Hakimi Fauzi
22	DF	MAS	Idham Zuhair Roslisam
23	MF	MAS	Alif Haikal Sabri
24	MF	MAS	Adib Abd Nahar
25	GK	MAS	Ayyub Hakimi Saiful Affendi
26	DF	MAS	Syahirul Fazly Zaini
27	DF	MAS	Ilham Syukri Jamalluddin
28	MF	MAS	Khairu Anwar Khazali
29	FW	MAS	Syakimi Karim
30	FW	MAS	Nazry Sharulnizam

== Management ==
Management
Position	Name
Team manager	(Malaysia) Syaiful Hailmie bin Wahidon
Assistant manager	(Malaysia) Rashmizan bin Rasid
Head coach	(Malaysia) Omar bin Salim
Assistant coach	(Malaysia) Farid Ramli (Malaysia) Ezrie Shafizie
Goalkeeper coach	(Malaysia) Mohd Sany bin Mohammad Fahmi @ Valiappan
Physio	(Malaysia) Mohd Yazid bin Mohamad
Team official	(Malaysia) Noor Hazareeda Binti Zainal Abidin (Malaysia) Anuar bin Mat Yusop
Team media	(Malaysia) A. Adha Ibrahim bin Abdul Yatim
Kitman	(Malaysia) Faqroul Faiz bin Mohd Nizam (Malaysia) Muhammad Suhaimi bin Aripin (Malaysia) Rezawandi bin Jamain

== Honours ==
=== Domestic ===
League

- Malaysia A2 Amateur League
  - Central Zone Runners-up / Quarter-finalists: 2025–26

Cup

- Piala Emas Raja-Raja
  - Champions (1): 2024
