= Melaka Malay's F.A. =

Malaysian football club

Melaka Malay Football Association ڤرساتوان بولا سڤق ملايو ملاک
- Founded: 2020; 6 years ago
- President: Mohd Ridhwan Mohd Ali

Melaka Malay's Football Association (Malay: Persatuan Bola Sepak Melayu Melaka), is a football organization established in 2020 in the Malaysian state of Melaka (Malacca). Unlike the Melaka Football Association (MAFA) which manages professional football teams and leagues in the state, PBMM focuses specifically on organizing football activities involving the Malay community in Melaka and operates domestic tournaments football known as the Agong Cup and the Piala Emas Raja-Raja.

== History ==
PBMM was established to preserve and promote the Malay football heritage in Melaka. In November 2023, Mohd Ridhwan Mohd Ali was appointed as the new President of this association.

PBMM’s main focus is participating in traditional and historic tournaments such as:

- Piala Emas Raja-Raja (King’s Gold Cup) — one of Malaysia’s oldest and most prestigious football tournaments, first played in 1922.
- Piala Agong (The King's Cup) — another historic competition within Malaysia.

PBMM represents the Malay football scene in these events, preserving the legacy of traditional football tournaments in the country.

=== 2024 Piala Emas Raja-Raja Host ===
Melaka, under PBMM, hosted the 102nd edition of the Piala Emas Raja-Raja tournament in October 2024, featuring 16 teams from across Malaysia. This reaffirmed PBMM’s commitment to maintaining and promoting traditional football tournaments in the region.
