= Royal Malaysian Police Football Association =

Malaysian football association

Football Association of Royal Malaysian Police Persatuan Bolasepak Polis Diraja Malaysia
- Founded: 1990; 36 years ago
- Purpose: Football association
- Headquarters: Pusat Latihan Polis, Jalan Sultan Yahya Petra, 54100
- Location: Kuala Lumpur, Federal Territories of Malaysia
- President: DIG Dato’ Sri Abdul Aziz bin Abdul Majid
- Website: pdrmfa.com.my

Football Association of Royal Malaysian Police (commonly abbreviated as PDRM FA; Malay: Persatuan Bolasepak Polis Diraja Malaysia) is the governing body of football representing the Royal Malaysia Police, Malaysia. RMPFA is a member of the Football Association of Malaysia (FAM), the official governing body of football in Malaysia.

== History ==
The Royal Malaysian Police Football Association (PDRM FA) was established in 1990, although the formal association was only established later, the roots of police football in Malaysia go much further back. Football activities within the police force date back to around 1921, when teams were formed mainly for recreation, fitness, and camaraderie among officers. These early teams played mostly internal matches and local competitions, gradually building a footballing identity tied to the police institution. The Royal Malaysian Police Football Association (PDRM FA) was officially founded in 1990 in Kuala Lumpur. It was created to represent the police force in the newly evolving semi-professional Malaysian league system. In 1989, Malaysia introduced the semi-pro league, allowing teams from state FAs, the military, and the police to compete. PDRM entered this system in 1990, marking its transition from institutional team to competitive club.

== Association management ==
Position	Name
President	(Malaysia) DIG Dato’ Sri Abdul Aziz bin Abdul Majid
Deputy president	(Malaysia) CP Dato' Abd Rahim Jaafar
Vice president 1	(Malaysia) DCP Datuk Mohd Faisal bin Yahya
Vice president 2	(Malaysia) DCP Dato’ Alzafny bin Ahmad
General secretary	(Malaysia) ACP Hammizamri bin Abdullah
Treasurer	(Malaysia) SAC Datuk Fazlisyam bin Abd Majid

== Notable affiliations ==
- PDRM FA football team
- Polis Diraja Malaysia FC
- PULAPOL F.C.

== See also ==
- Malaysia Premier Futsal League
- Malaysia Futsal Cup
- History of Malaysian football
