= Taman Bunga Merdeka =

Park in Malacca, Malaysia

- Coronation Park
- Taman Bunga Merdeka
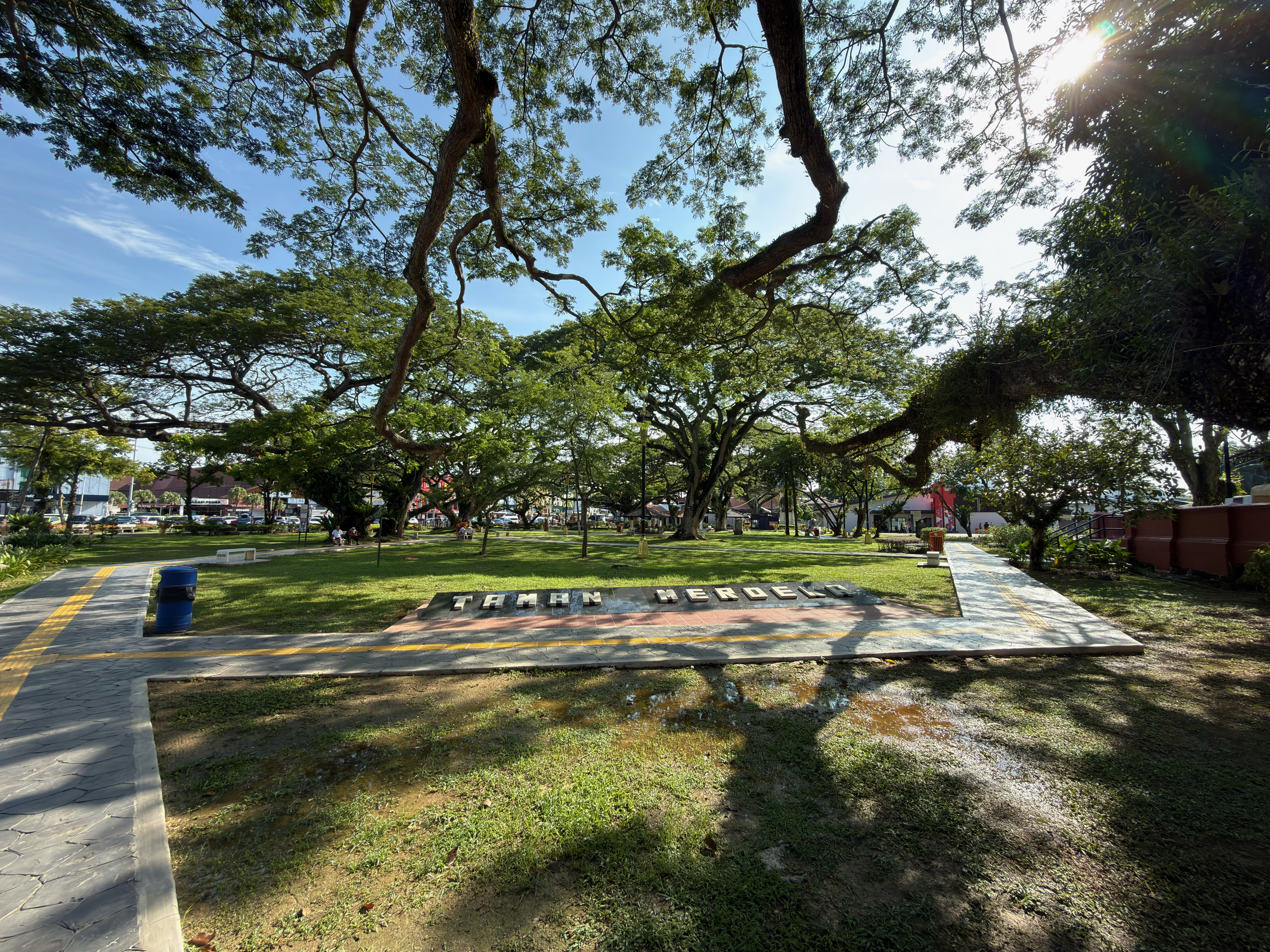
- Interactive map of Taman Bunga Merdeka
- Location: Malacca
- Nearest city: Malacca
- Coordinates: 2.191194°N 102.248786°E
- Designated: May 30, 1953

Taman Bunga Merdeka (literally meaning Independence Flower Park) originally known as the Coronation Park is a public park in Malacca City, Malacca, Malaysia. Located along Jalan Kota and facing the People's Museum and other museums, it is one of few parks in the city center. It was built by the British in 1953 and named to memorialise the coronation of Queen Elizabeth II, when the park still fronted on the sea (landfill has removed its seafront since then). The park is part of a UNESCO World Heritage-recognized historic district, the Historic Cities of the Straits of Malacca listing.

== Attractions ==
The park includes the "Transportation area" of the People's Museum, which was established in collaboration with Malayan Railway, the Royal Malaysian Air Force and the West Malaysia Department of Civil Aviation. It contains a number of historic transportation artifacts, such as:

- a propeller-driven Scottish Aviation Twin Pioneer CC Mk 1 aircraft, the "Lang Rajawali", which was the first aircraft acquired by the Royal Malayan Airforce after it was founded in 1962,
- a diesel locomotive named Sungai Lukut 21111, which was built in Japan in 1965, and an accompanying vintage railway carriage,
- a vintage yellow fire engine,
- replica bullock cart.

The park includes foundation stones of a Portuguese- and Dutch-built bastion in the city walls of Malacca, which was eventually demolished by the British. It also includes the Sungei Ujong War Memorial.

The term "Melaka Transportation Museum" was also used for a museum that was opened in the outlying Ayer Keroh area of Melaka, in 2010, which was eventually closed; the outdoor transportation museum of the downtown park survives.

== Former museum of same name ==
The Transportation Museum (Malay: Muzium Pengangkutan) was a museum located separately, in a suburban part of Melaka.

The museum was opened on 15 April 2010 with a cost of MYR198,900. The museum exhibited various types of vehicles, ranging from cars, motorcycles, bicycles etc. The museum was opened daily except Monday, first day of Eid al-Fitr and Eid al-Adha.

== Gallery ==
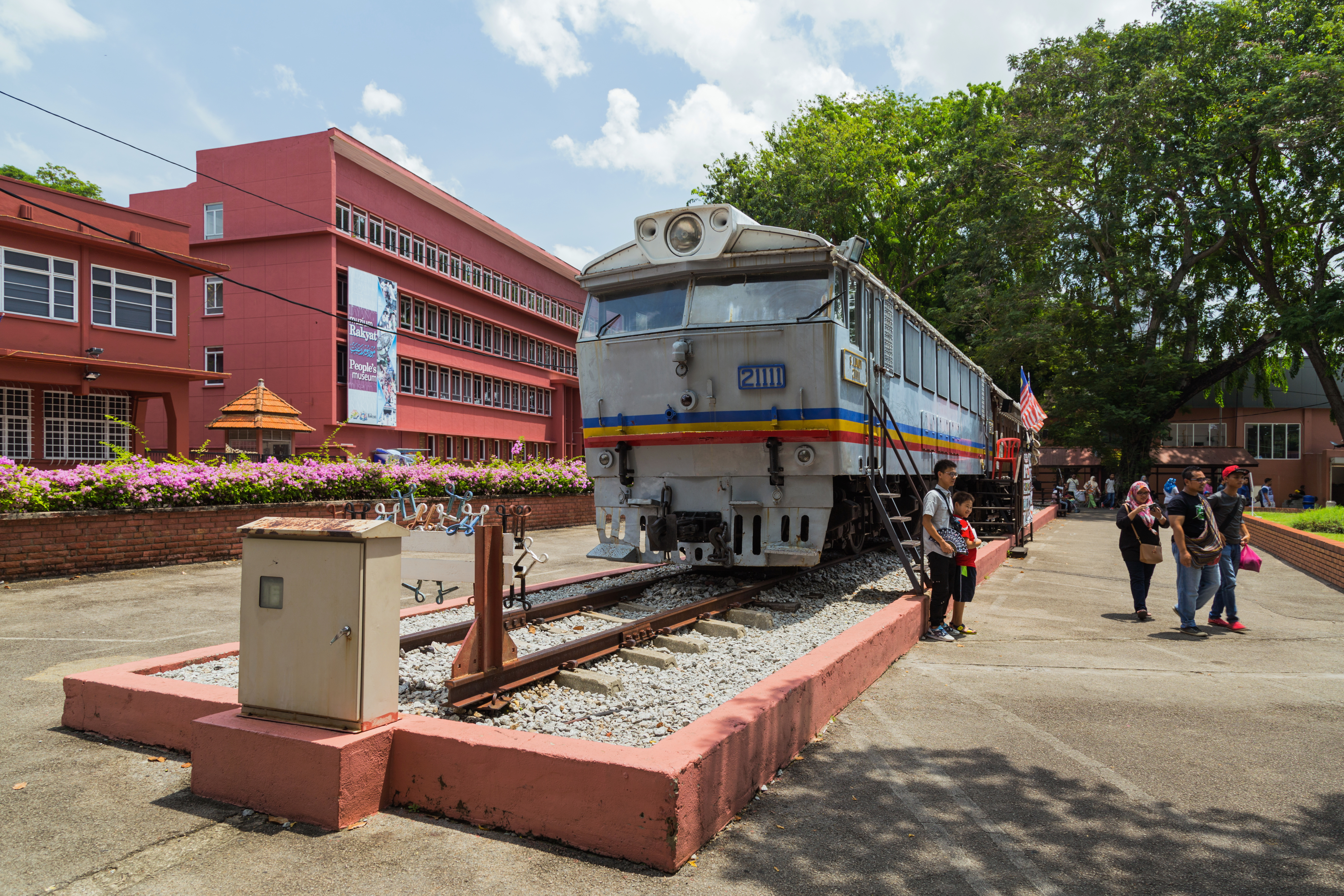
Sungai Lukut, with People's Museum behind

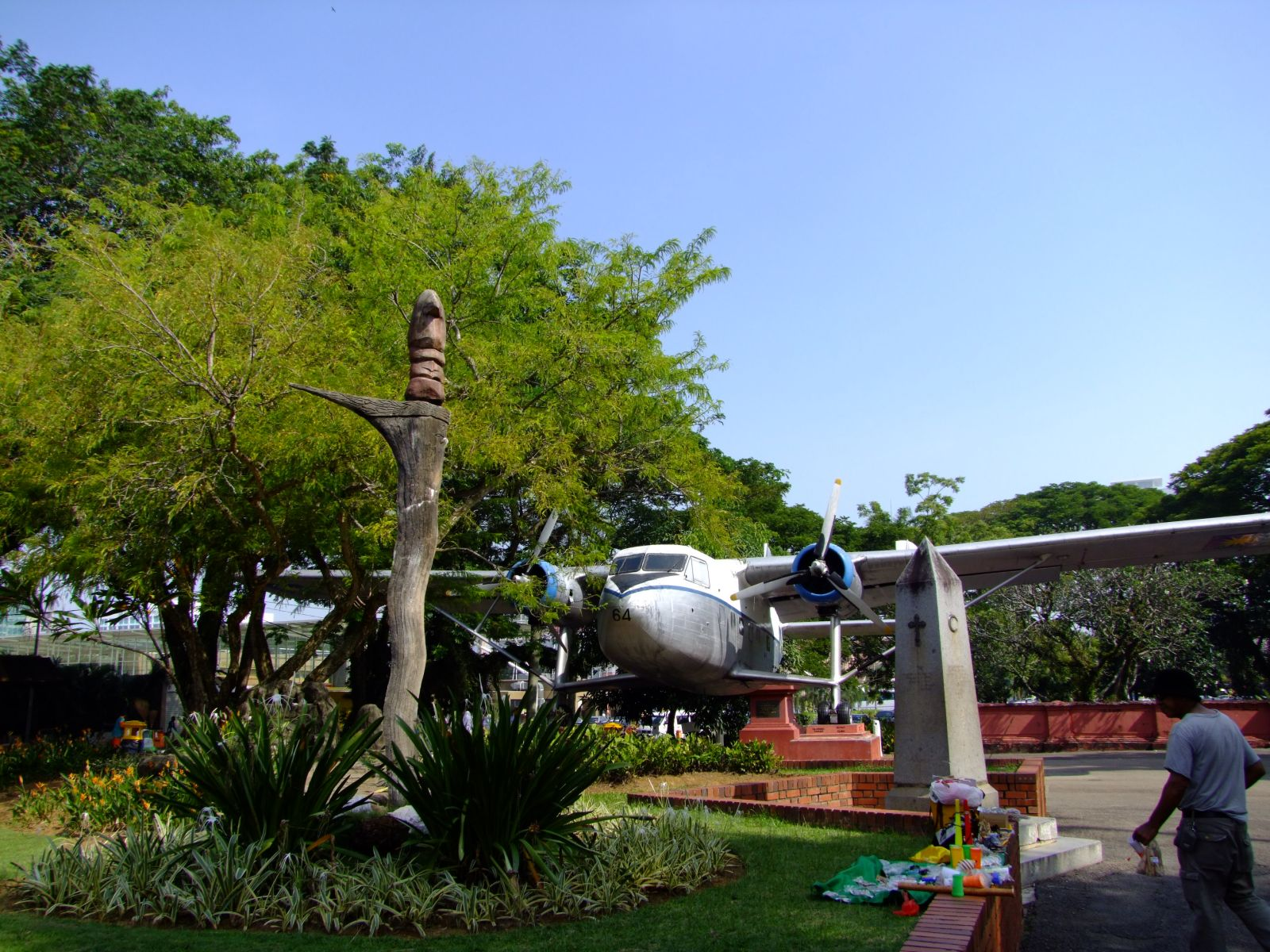
Lang Rajawali

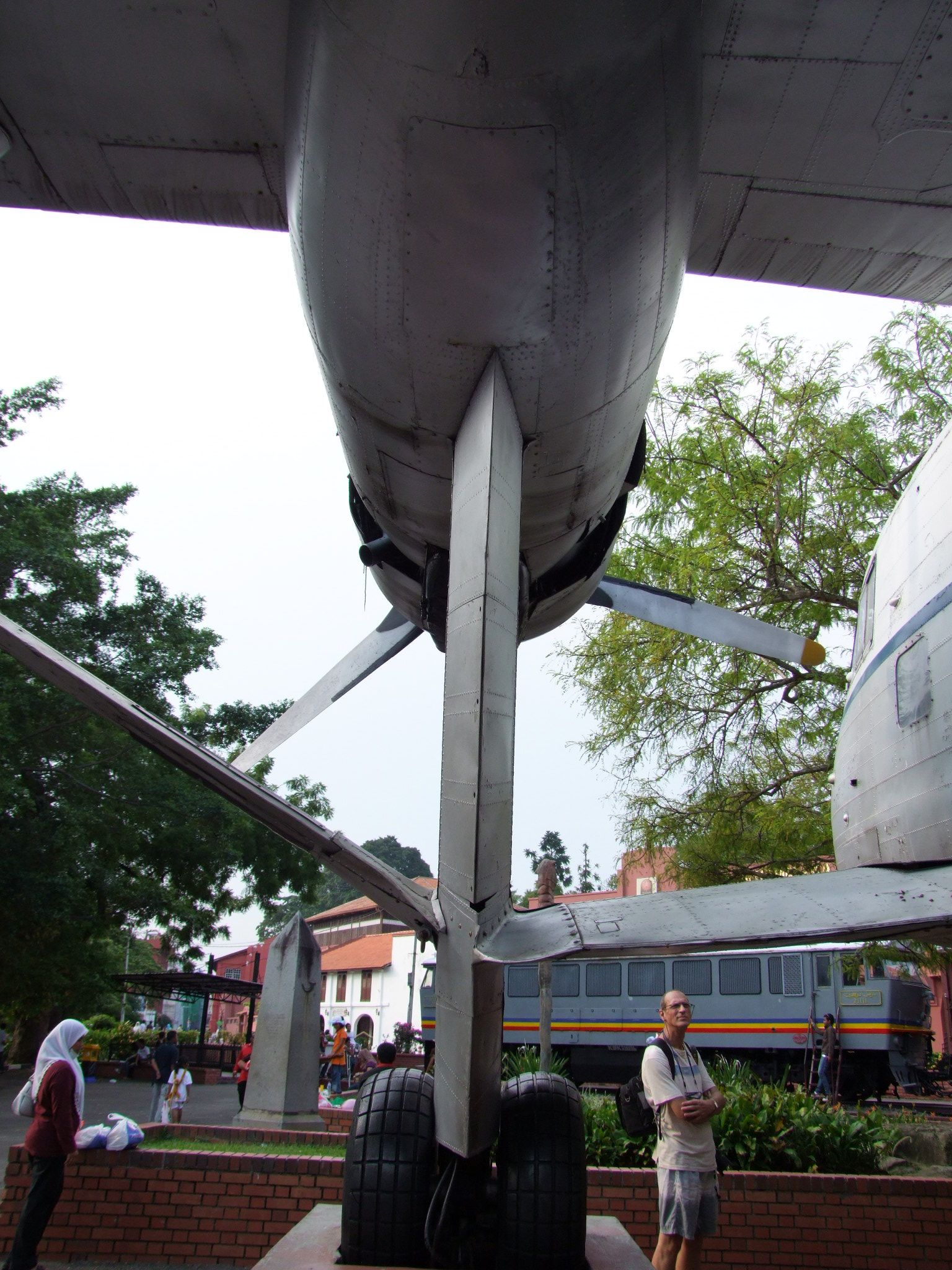
Plane undercarriage, with railway carriage beyond

== See also ==
- List of museums in Malaysia
- List of tourist attractions in Malacca
