= Kite Museum (Malacca) =

Museum in Melaka Tengah, Malacca, Malaysia

- Muzium Layang-Layang
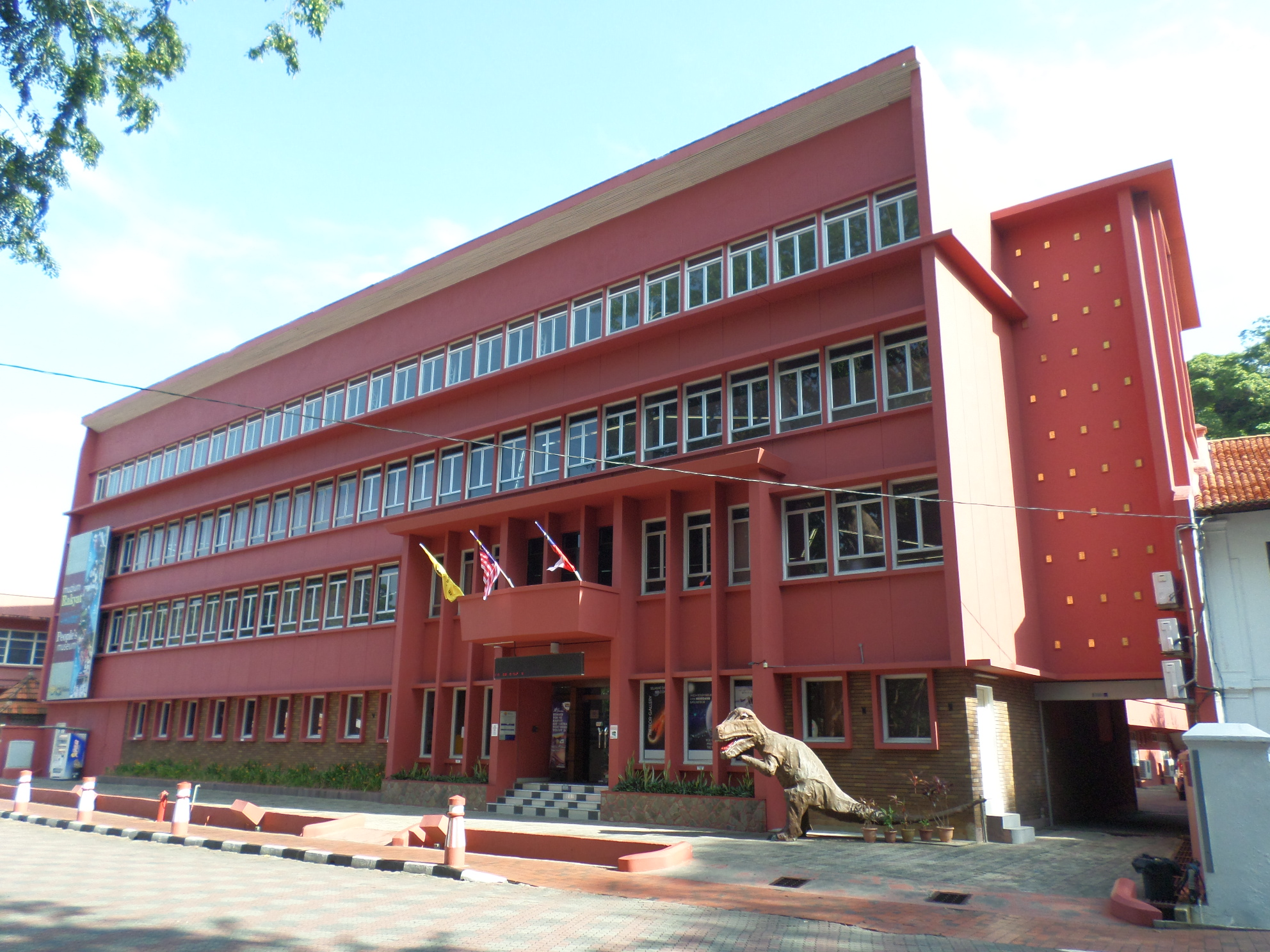
- Established: September 1995
- Location: Malacca City, Malacca, Malaysia
- Coordinates: 2°11′N 102°15′E
- Type: museum

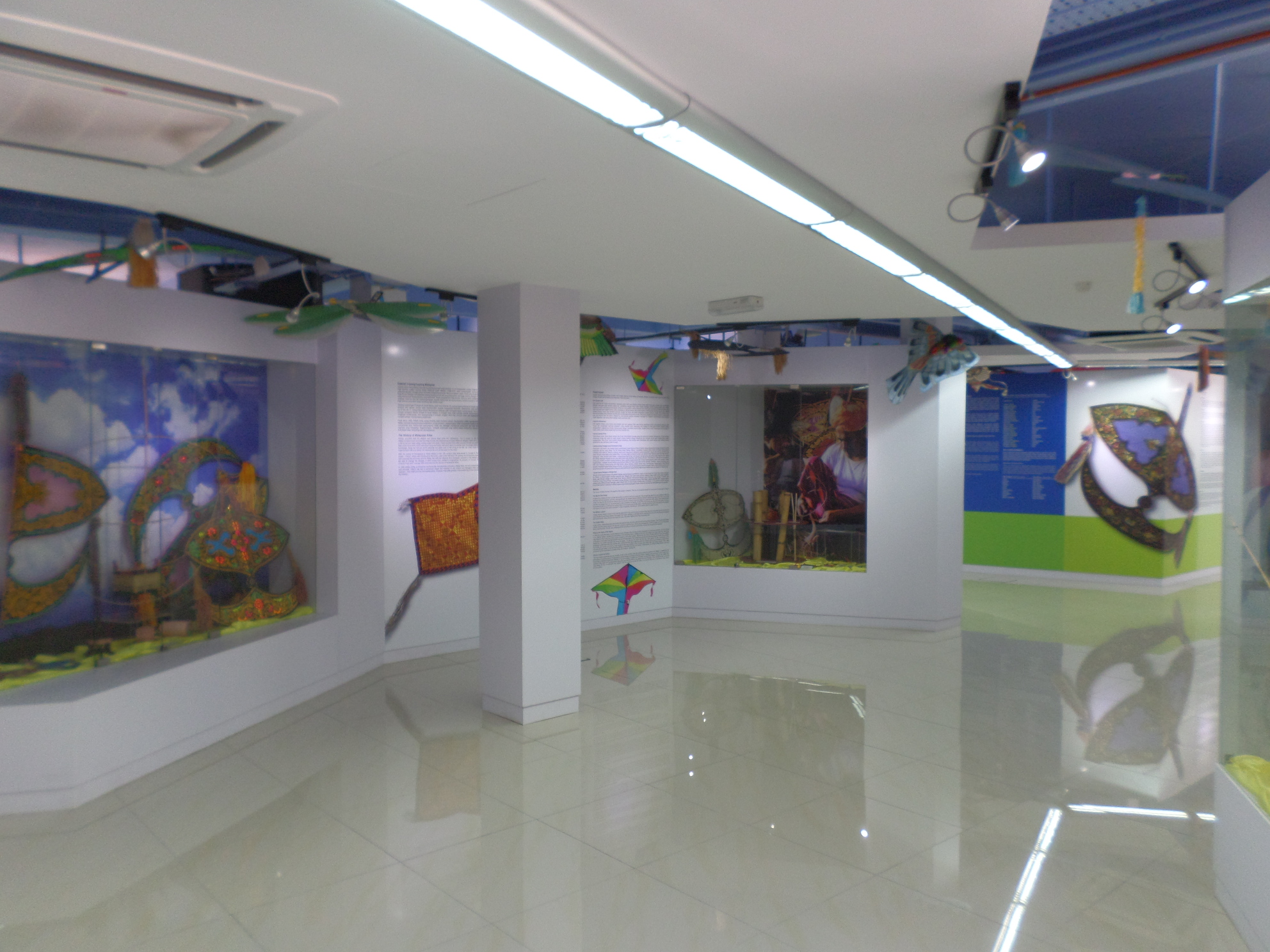
Kite Museum exhibition hall

Kite Museum (Malay: Muzium Layang-Layang) is a museum about kites in Malacca City, Malacca, Malaysia, which was officially opened in September 1995 by Chief Minister Mohd Zin Abdul Ghani in conjunction with the Regional Malay Customs seminar. It occupies the upper floor of the former Historical City Municipal Council building, originally constructed in the 1960s and believed to be built on top of the ruins of Dutch building, which also houses the People's Museum and Beauty Museum at the ground floor and top floor respectively. The museum displays various aspects of kites, such as communication, use as weapons, sport, leisure activities, how different countries make kites, different materials to make kites, role of kites in the life of people etc. It also displays the Wau Gallery, Traditional Games, Top Spinning Gallery and Datuk Wira Haji Md Borhan bin Yaman Gallery. It opens everyday from 9.00 a.m. to 5.00 p.m.

== See also ==
- List of museums in Malaysia
- List of tourist attractions in Malacca
