= Beauty Museum =

Museum in Melaka Tengah, Malacca, Malaysia

- Muzium Kecantikan
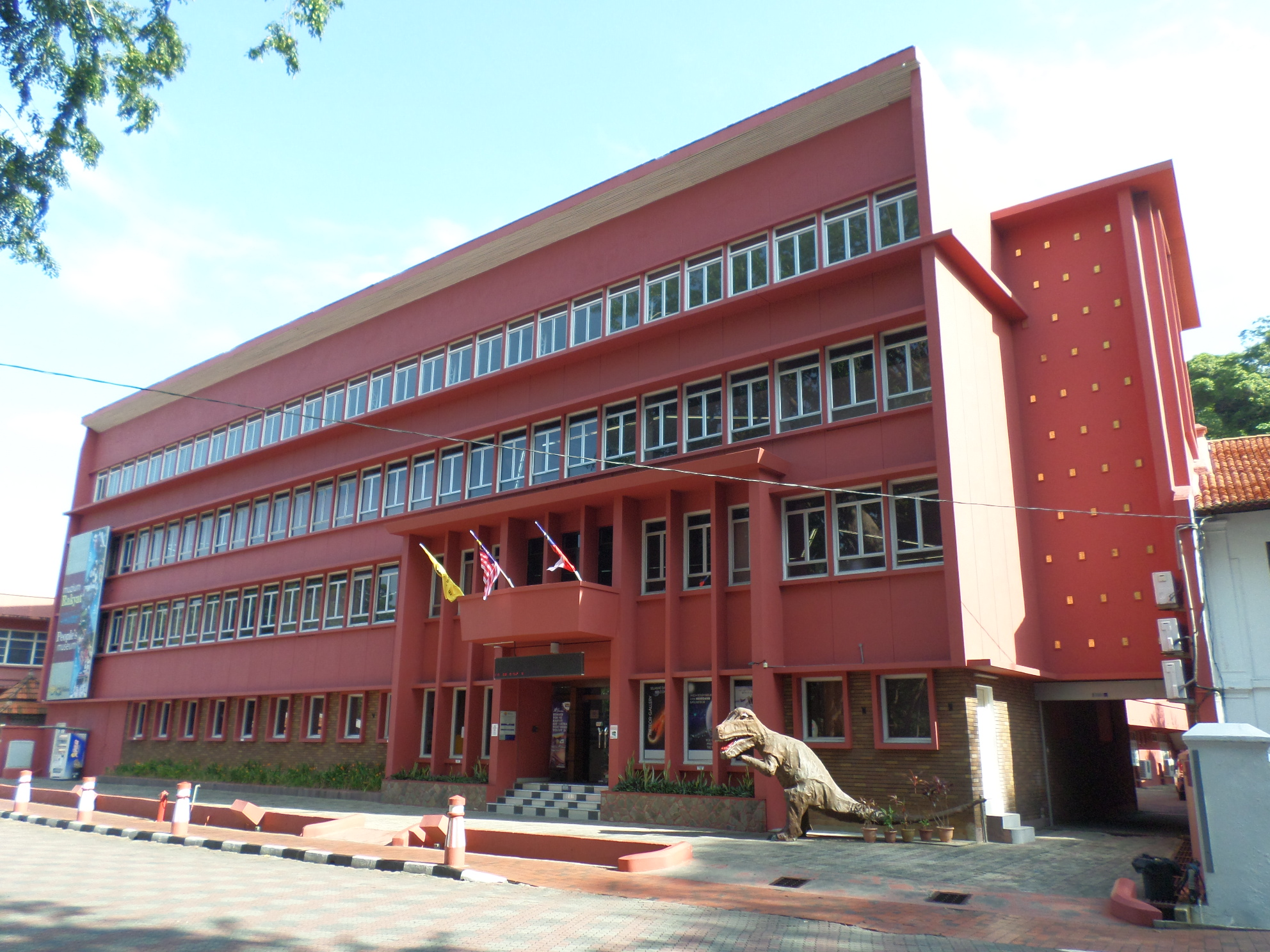
- Established: 1996
- Location: Malacca City, Malacca, Malaysia
- Coordinates: 2°11′30.1″N 102°14′57.2″E
- Type: museum
- Visitors: 2,000 per month
- Parking: No

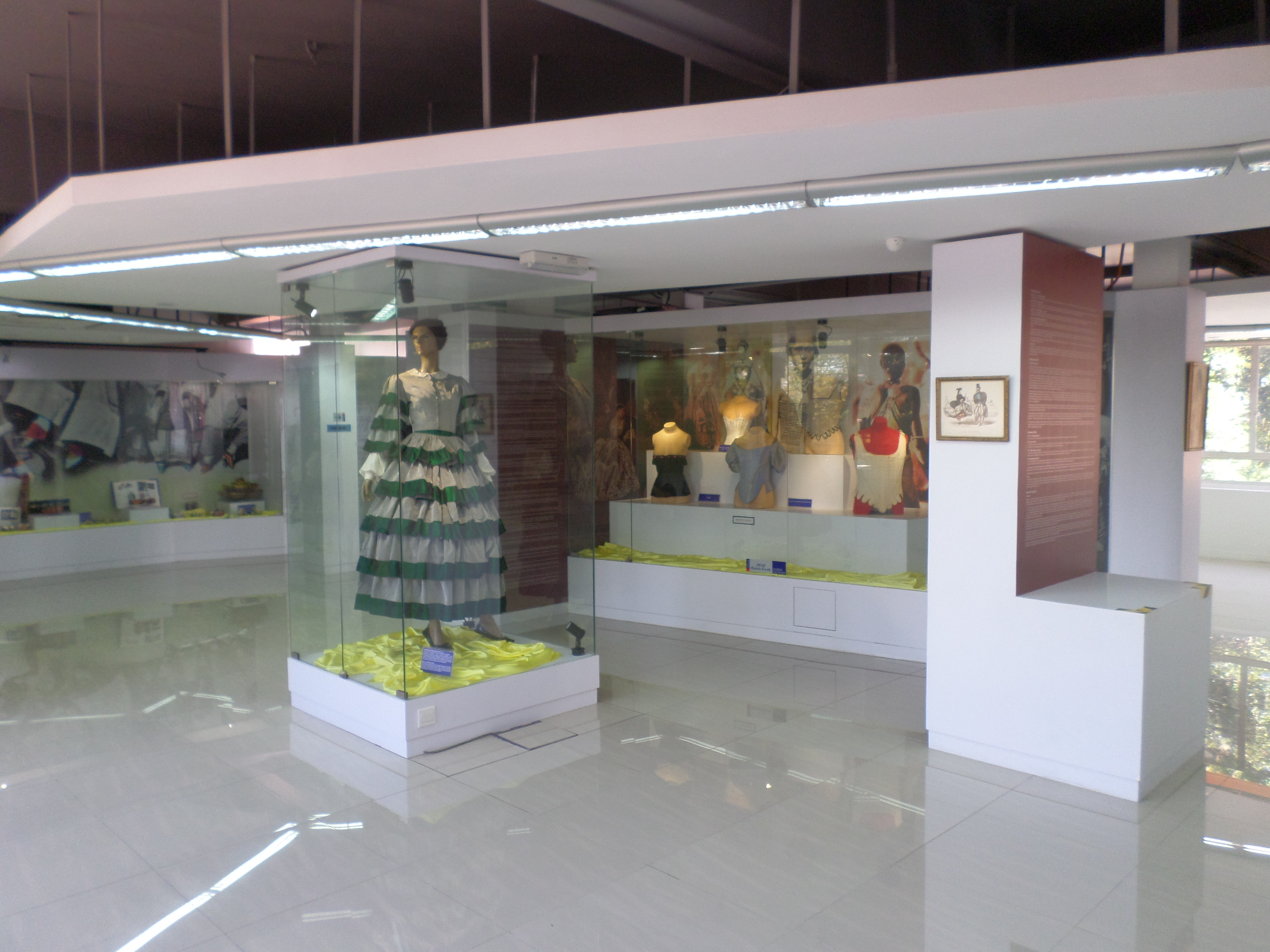
Beauty Museum exhibition hall

Beauty Museum or Museum of Enduring Beauty (Malay: Muzium Kecantikan) is a museum about beauty standards and concepts in Malacca City, Malacca, Malaysia, which was opened in 1996. It occupies the top floor of the former Historical City Municipal Council building, originally constructed in the 1960s and believed to be built on top of the ruins of Dutch building, which also houses the People's Museum and Kite Museum at the ground and the upper floor respectively.

The museum exhibits the standard of beauty since ancient until modern times and different concepts of beauty as practiced by different cultures. Among those different beauty concepts are skin tattooing, lip stretching by round discs insertion, tooth filing, scarification, head molding into oval shapes and feet growth restricting. It opens everyday from 9.00 a.m. to 5.00 p.m.

== See also ==
- List of museums in Malaysia
- List of tourist attractions in Malacca
