= Sungei Ujong War Memorial =

Memorial in Melaka City, Melaka, Malaysia

Coordinates: 2°11′30″N 102°14′55″E

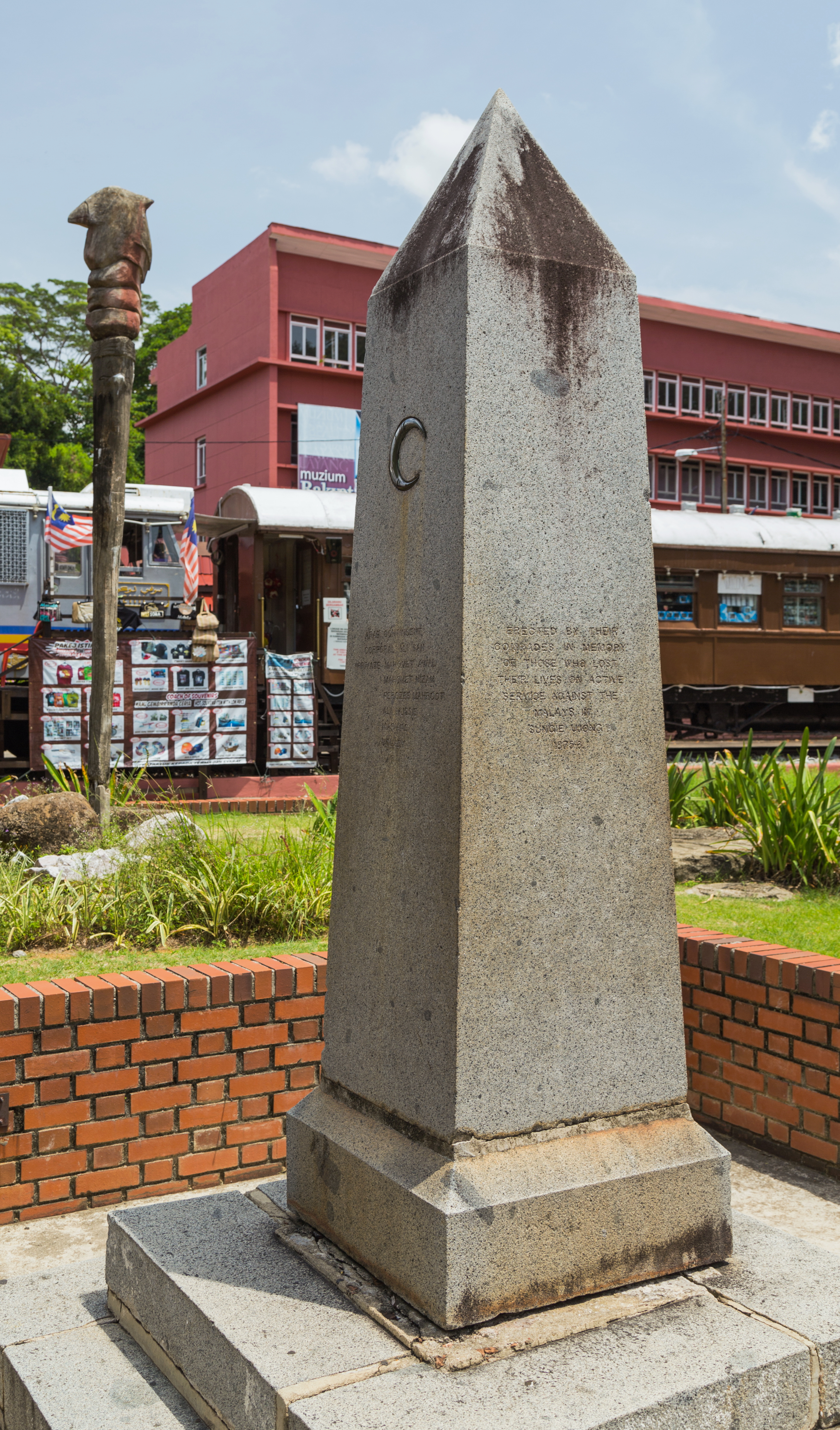
- Location: Malacca City, Malacca, Malaysia
- Type: Obelisk
- Material: Granite
- Completion date: Unknown
- Dedicated to: The soldiers who died in military operations during the Sungei Ujong campaign of 1875–76

The Sungei Ujong War Memorial is situated in Coronation Park (Taman Bunga Merdeka), Malacca City, Malacca, Malaysia, and commemorates the fallen in the Sungei Ujong campaign of 1875–76.

The obelisk-shaped, granite memorial was erected in memory of the soldiers who died in military operations against Malays in Sungei Ujong during the civil war between Tuanku Antah and his cousin Tuanku Ahmad Tunggal.

== Inscription ==
The memorial is inscribed: "Erected by their comrades in memory of those who lost their lives on active service against the Malays in Sungei Ujong 1875–6", and includes the names of 13 men who were killed.

On one side of the obelisk are the names of four British soldiers of the 10th Foot (Lincolnshire Regiment) which appear under a Church of England cross: Sergeant F. Owen and Privates J. Ball, J. Newman and H. Smith.

On another are the names of two Gurkhas of the 1st Gurkha Light Infantry under a horn bugle: Naik Bucktring Rau and Sepoy Dulieet Poon,

On a third side are the names of seven members of the Arab contingent under a crescent: Corporal Ali San, and Privates Mahomet Awal, Mahomet Nizam, Ferozee Mahroot, Ali Mussie, Mariano, and Volaey.
