= Malacca City Council =

Malacca Historic City Council Majlis Bandaraya Melaka Bersejarah
- Emblem in use since the declaration of Malacca Town as a historic city in 1989. When Malacca Town gained city status and became Malacca City in 2003, the words on the emblem were changed from "Majlis Perbandaran Melaka Bandaraya Bersejarah" to "Majlis Bandaraya Melaka Bersejarah".

Type
- Type: City council of Malacca City

History
- Founded: 15 April 1989
- Preceded by: Historic City of Malacca Municipal Council

Leadership
- Mayor: Datuk Hj. Shadan bin Hj. Othman
- City Secretary: Muhammad Firdaus Bin Shariff

Structure
- Seats: 25
- Political groups: BN (18): UMNO (14); MCA (3); MIC (1); Independent (7): State officials, police and fire brigade (4); Youth (1); OKU (1); NGO (1)

Meeting place
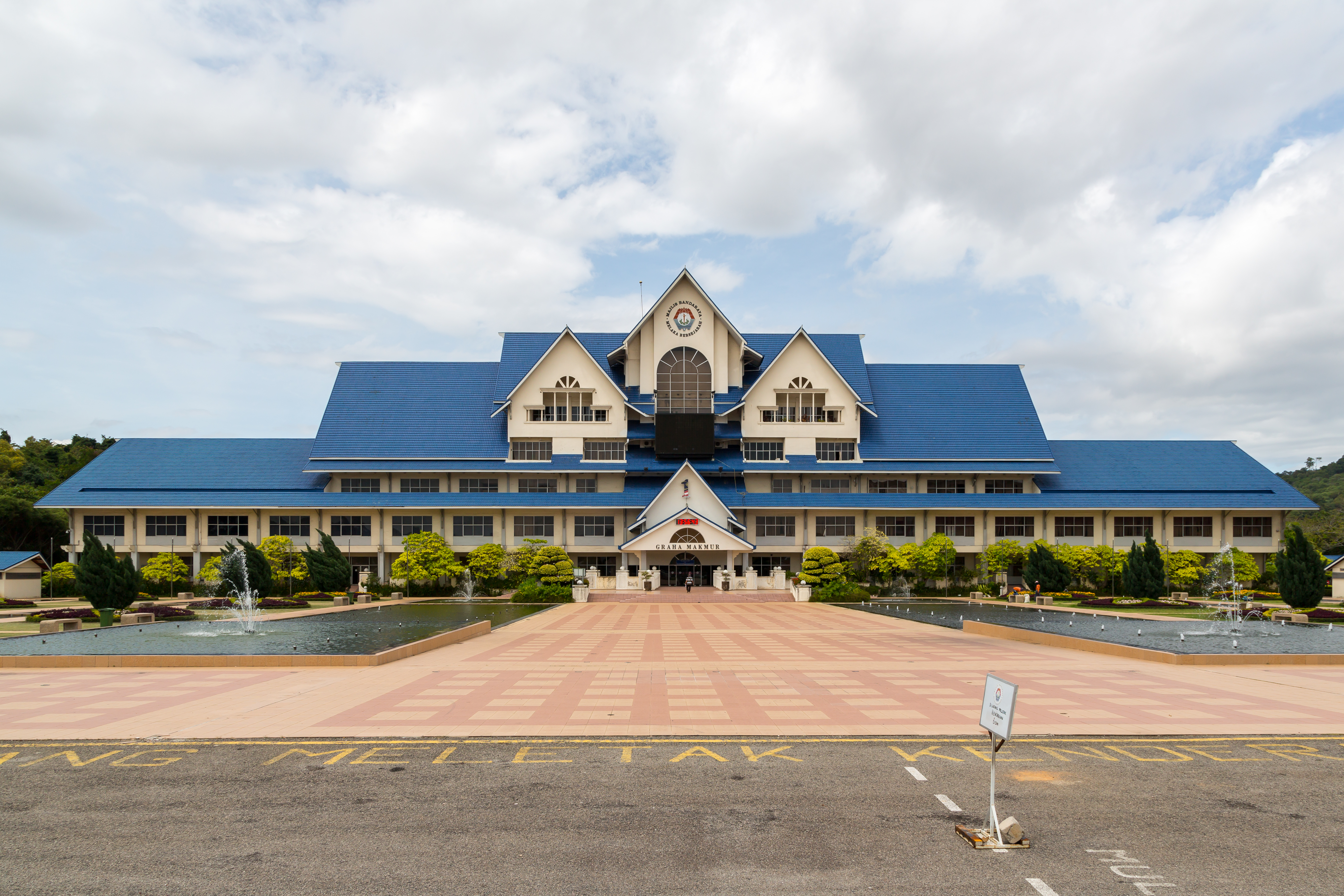
- Bangunan MBMB, Jalan Graha Makmur, Ayer Keroh, Malacca (Headquarters of the city council since 1992)

Website
- www.mbmb.gov.my

Malacca City Council, officially known as the Malacca Historic City Council or Melaka Historic City Council (Note: The state government uses the Malay language spelling of the state's name, as opposed to the more traditional English language spelling of its name, "Malacca".) (Malay: Majlis Bandaraya Melaka Bersejarah, MBMB or MHCC) is the city council which administers Malacca City and most part of Melaka Tengah District. It is responsible for public health and sanitation, cleanliness management, town planning, environmental protection and building control, social and economic development and general maintenance functions of urban infrastructure. The MBMB main headquarters is located at Graha Makmur (roughly translates as Prosper Building) in Ayer Keroh, opposite that of Hang Tuah Jaya Municipal Council at Melaka Mall (formerly known as Plaza Kotamas).

== History ==
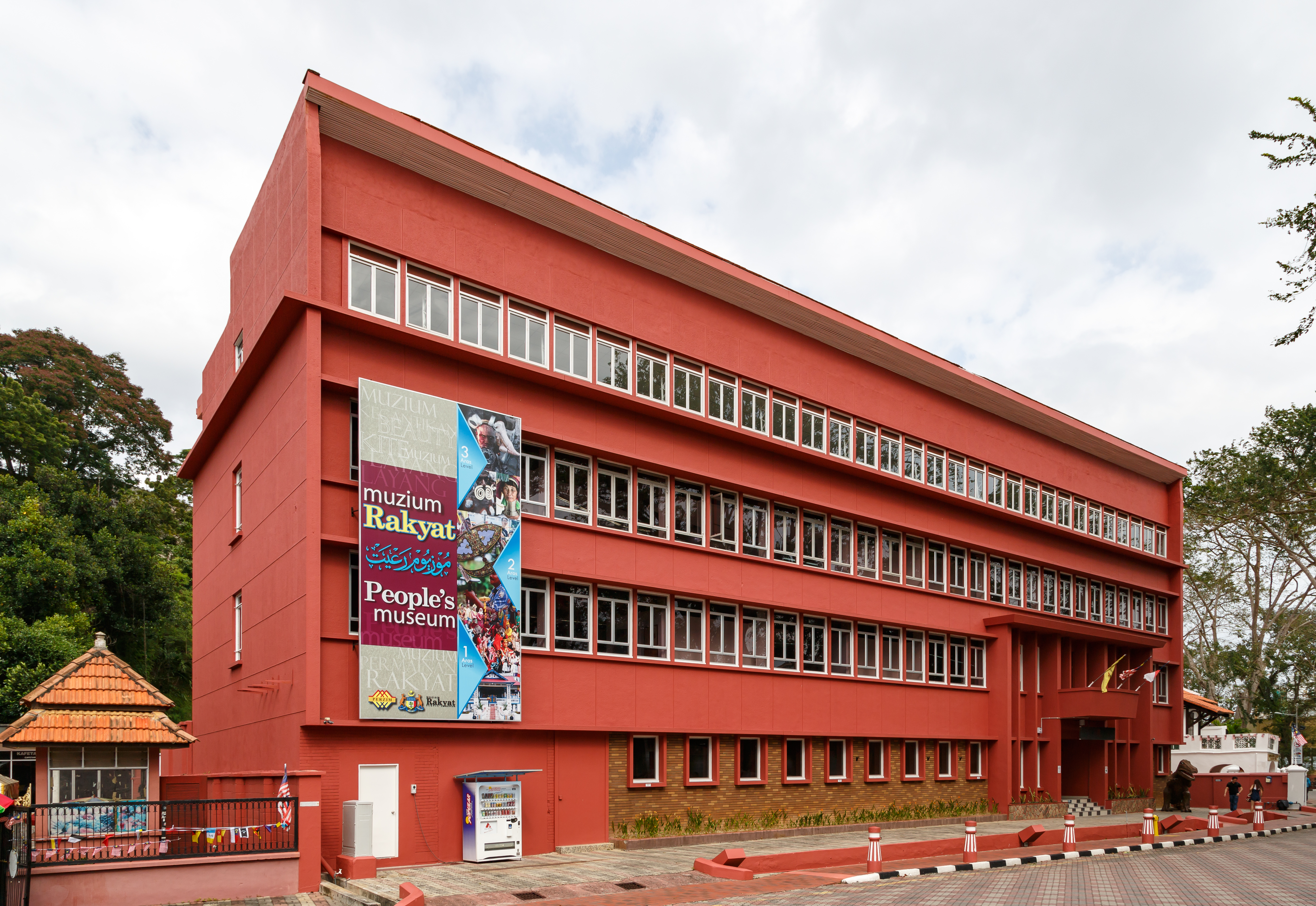
Former Historic City of Malacca Municipal Council building which is now the People's Museum

The Municipality of the Town and Fort of Malacca, 11 square kilometres (4.2 mi^{2}) wide, was established in 1824 by the British East India Company for the purpose of town planning, public order and collection of assessment rates. The council's activities were briefly disrupted during Japanese occupation of Malaya from 1942 until 1945, and resumed afterwards.

On 1 January 1977, the Municipality Authority and the Melaka Tengah Rural District Council (Majlis Daerah Luar Bandar Melaka Tengah) merged to form the Melaka Tengah Municipal Council (Majlis Perbandaran Melaka Tengah) with an administration area of 297.19 square kilometres (114.75 mi^{2}), encompassing the whole Melaka Tengah District. The council later became known as the Malacca Municipal Council (Majlis Perbandaran Melaka, MPM or MMC) in 1987 and the Historic City of Malacca Municipal Council (Majlis Perbandaran Melaka Bandaraya Bersejarah, MPMBB or HCMMC) on 15 April 1989 when the federal government granted the Historic City title to the town of Malacca. The headquarters of the council was originally located at the building in the city centre, which now houses the People's Museum, Kite Museum and the Beauty Museum, before being moved to the present building in Ayer Keroh on 15 April 1992 named Graha Makmur. The council obtained its present name on 15 April 2003 when Malacca Town was granted city status.

On 1 January 2010, part of its area including the headquarters' building, covering 57.66 square kilometres (22.26 mi^{2}) was separated for the establishment of Hang Tuah Jaya Municipal Council (Majlis Perbandaran Hang Tuah Jaya, MPHTJ or HTJMC). But the addition of a new administration area covering 30.86 square kilometres (11.92 mi^{2}) which was created out of land reclamation over the past 2 decades, resulted in the council's area currently stands at 270.39 square kilometres (104.40 mi^{2}).

In February 2019, the upgrade of the Graha Makmur administration building was started, to repaint the whole exterior wall into white color and use white industrial zinc slices for the roof replacing blue color. The project costs around 7 to 8 million ringgit.

Following a land swap with Hang Tuah Jaya Municipal Council area that took effect from 1 January 2023 according to Government Gazette dated 4 August 2022, the headquarters of the Malacca City Council became a part of the Malacca City municipal area again.

== List of mayors ==
#	Name of Mayors	Term start	Term end
1	Zaini Md Nor	15 April 2003	10 February 2008
2	Yusof Jantan	11 February 2008	31 December 2010
3	Zainal Abu; 1st term	1 January 2011	31 December 2014
4	Zainal Hussin	1 January 2015	31 May 2018
5	Azmi Hussain	1 June 2018	31 January 2019
6	Mansor Sudin	1 February 2019	31 March 2020
7	Zainal Abu; 2nd term	1 April 2020	31 January 2023
8	Shadan Othman	1 February 2023	Incumbent

== See also ==
- Hang Tuah Jaya Municipal Council
- MBMB Warriors F.C.
