= People's Museum =

Museum in Malacca City, Malacca, Malaysia

- Muzium Rakyat
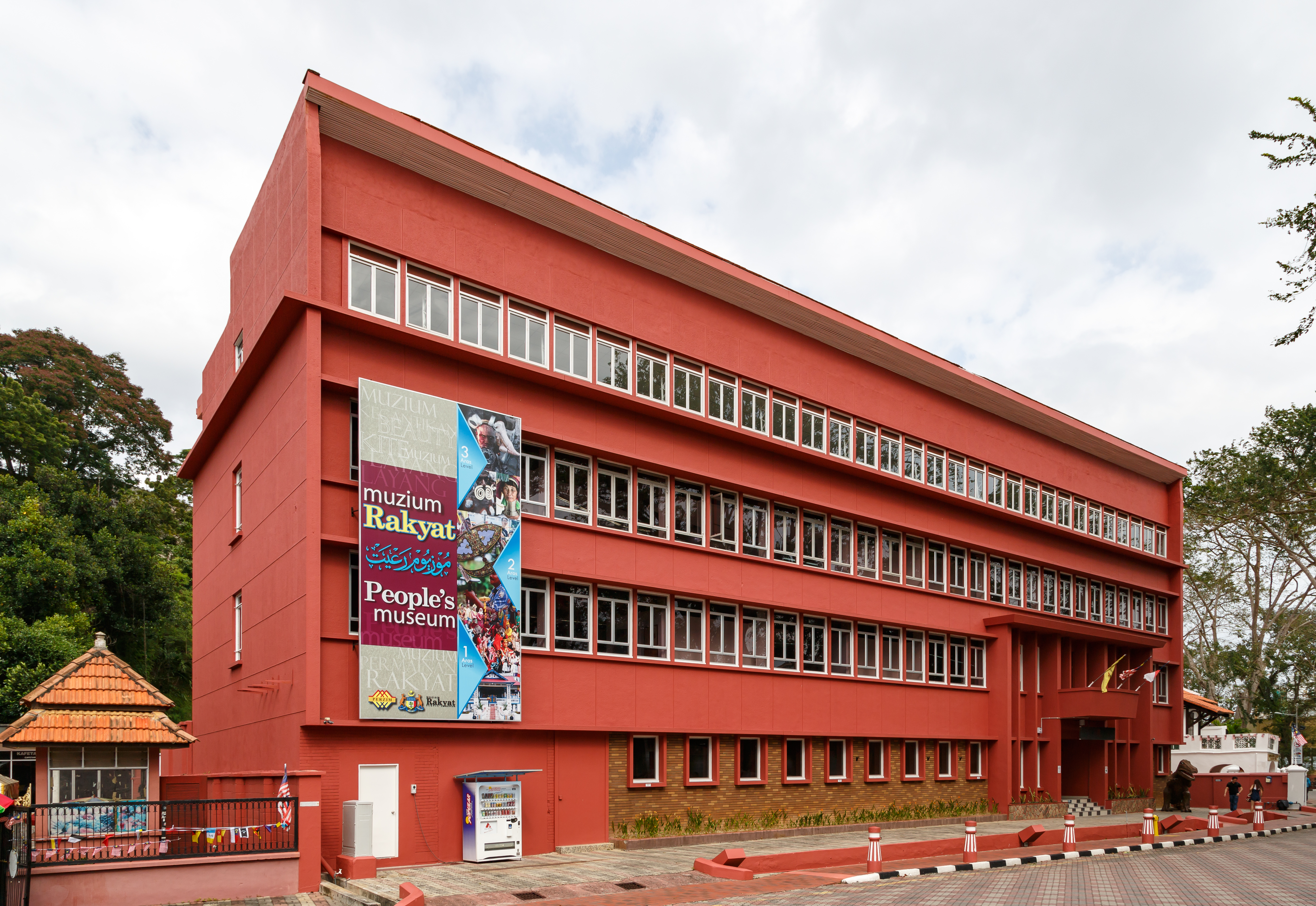
- Former name: Headquarters of Malacca Municipal Council
- Established: 16 April 1992
- Location: Malacca City, Malacca, Malaysia
- Coordinates: 2°11′30.1″N 102°14′57.2″E
- Type: museum
- Owner: Malacca Museum Corporation (PERZIM)

People's Museum (Malay: Muzium Rakyat) is a museum in Malacca City, Malacca, Malaysia, which records and preserves the achievements of Malacca in the development sector and officially opened on 16 April 1992 by then Prime Minister Mahathir Mohamad. It is located at the ground floor of the former Historical City of Malacca Municipal Council building, originally constructed in the 1960s and believed to be built on top of the ruins of Dutch building, which also houses the Beauty Museum and Kite Museum at the upper floors.

The museum building is divided into three parts, which focuses on the development carried out for the people's benefit and the success attained by the State of Malacca: the Sports Gallery, Community Gallery and UNESCO section. In front of the building, there is a courtyard in which the transportation area is located and was established in collaboration with Malayan Railway, Royal Malaysian Air Force and West Malaysia Department of Civil Aviation. It formed a part of Taman Bunga Merdeka (Independent Flower Park), formerly known as Coronation Park, which was built by the British in 1953 to memorialise the coronation of Queen Elizabeth II.

The artifacts displayed at the transportation area are:

- A propeller-driven Scottish Aviation Twin Pioneer CC Mk 1 aircraft, the "Lang Rajawali", which was the first aircraft acquired by the Royal Malayan Airforce.
- A diesel locomotive named Sungai Lukut 21111, which was built in Japan in 1965, and an accompanying vintage railway carriage.
- A Nubian Thornycrof model of fire engine mobile.
- A replica bullock cart.

== Gallery ==
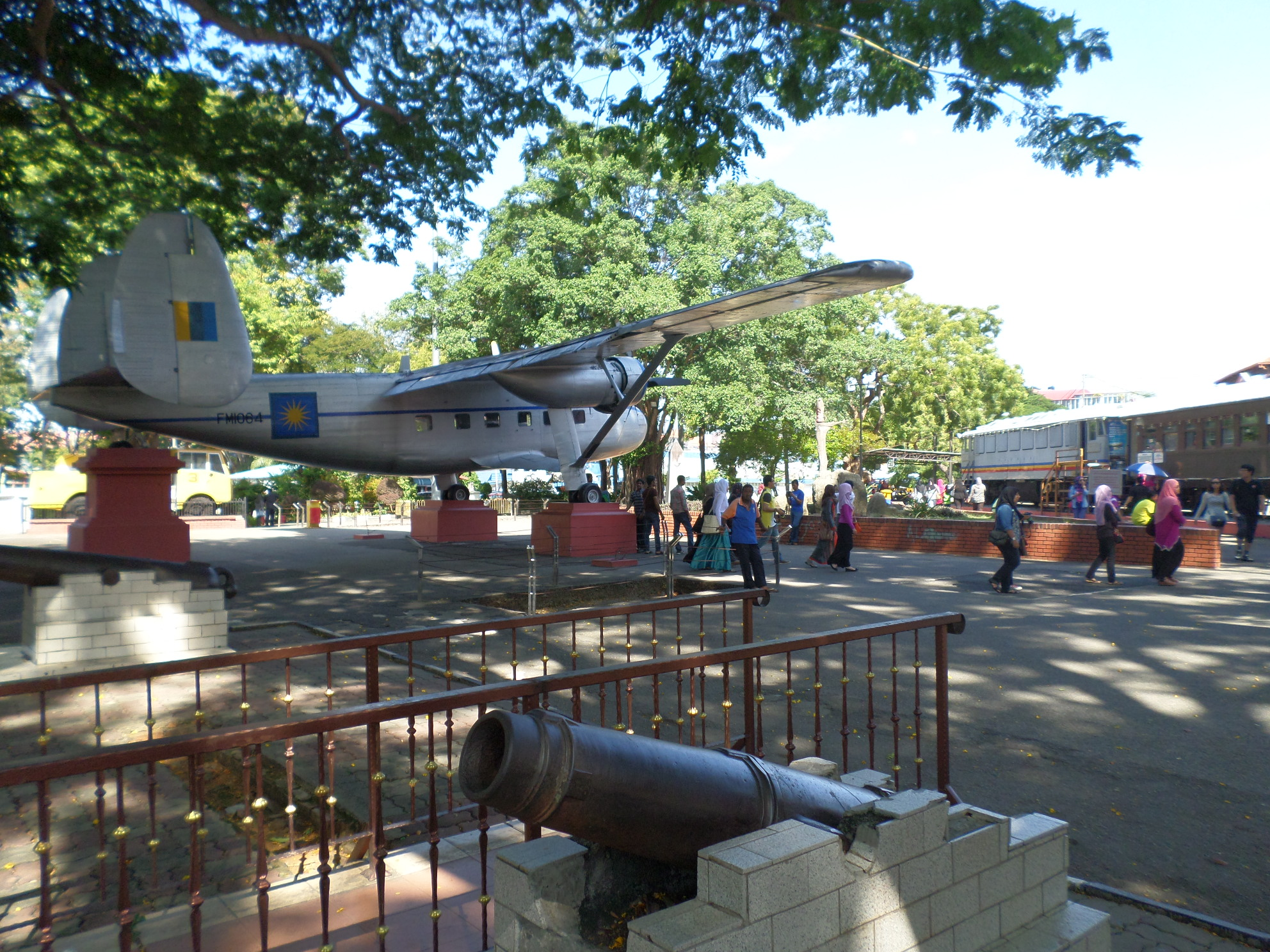
Transportation area

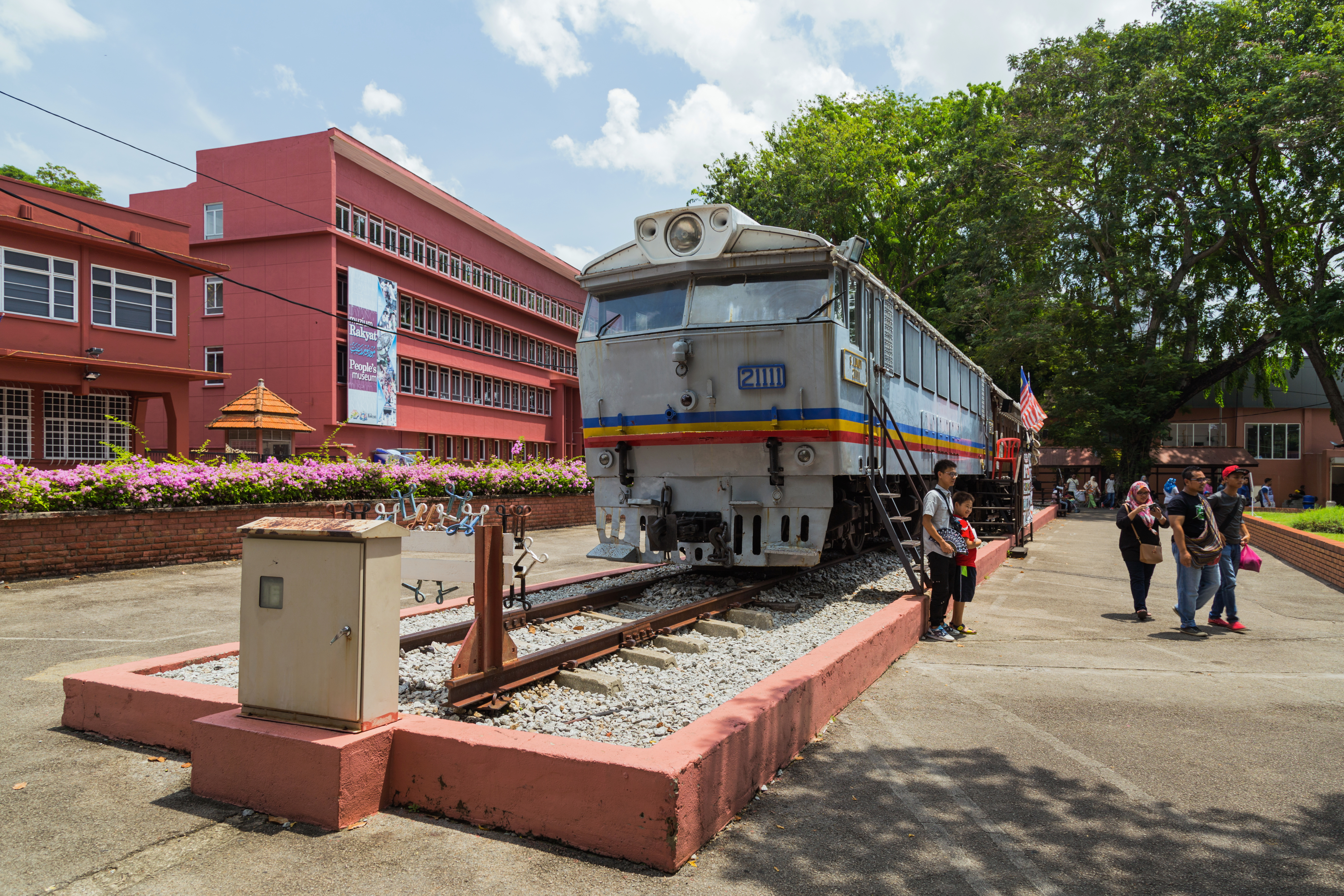
Sungai Lukut locomotive

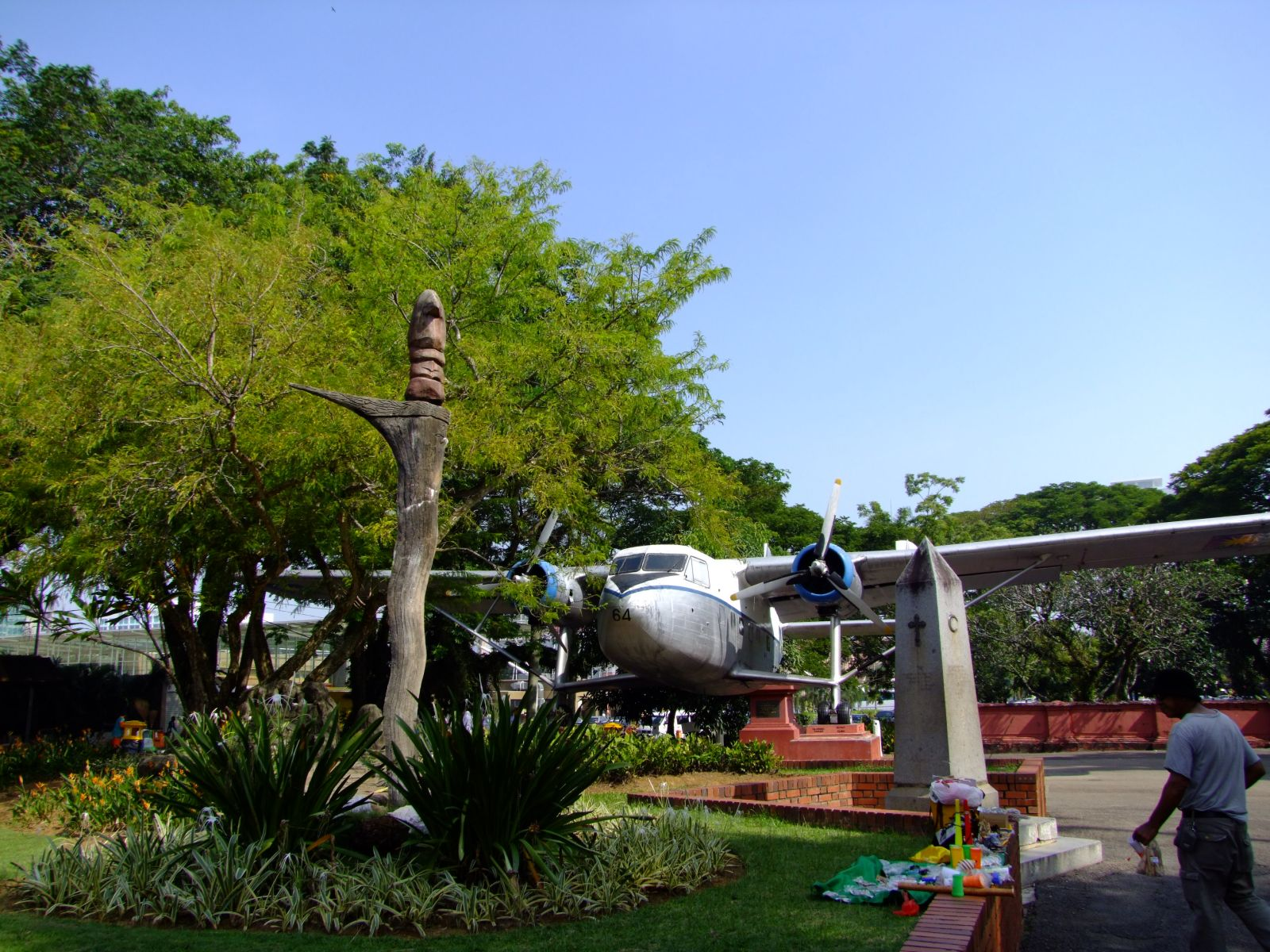
Lang Rajawali

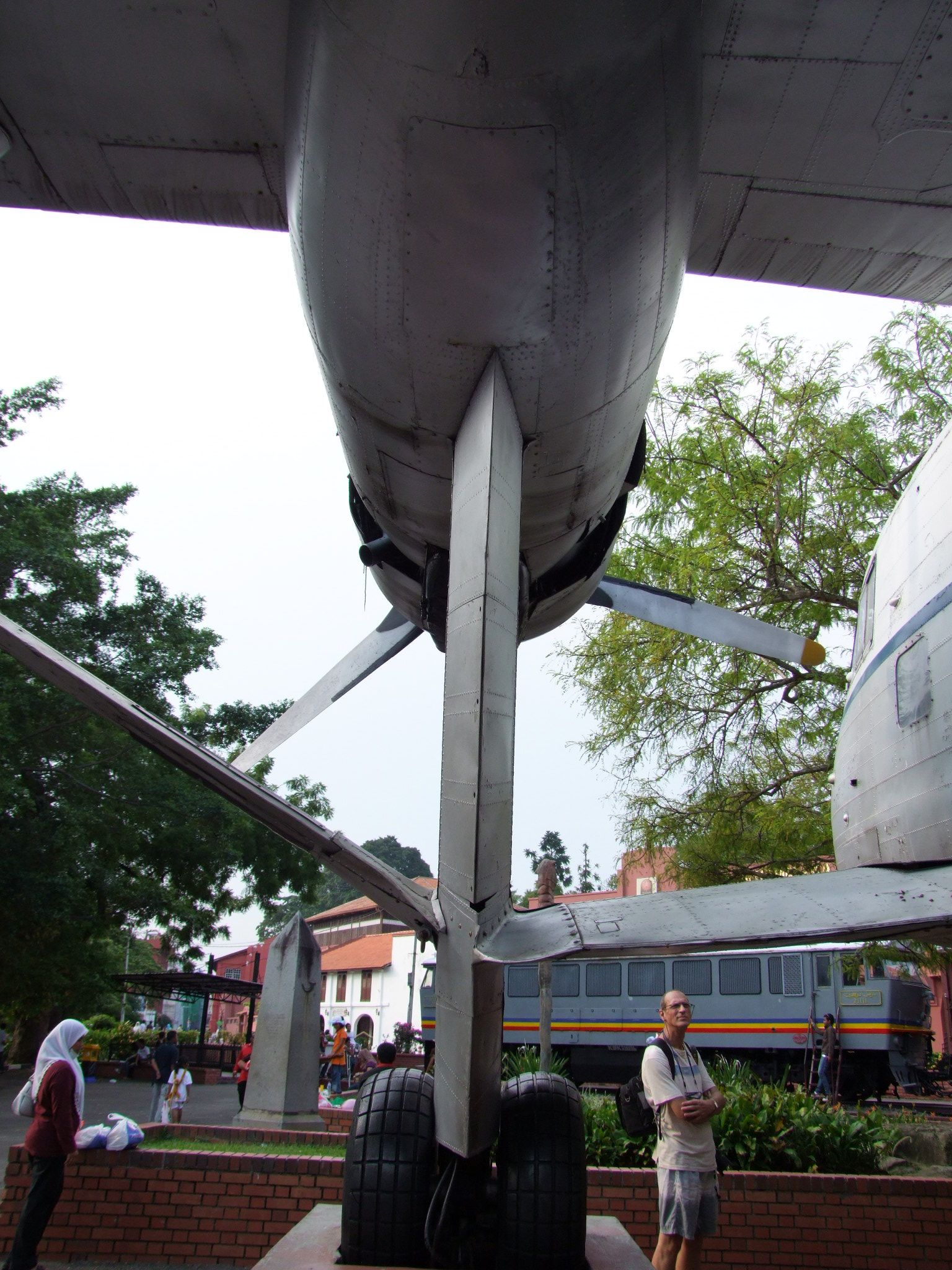
Plane undercarriage, with railway carriage beyond

== See also ==
- List of museums in Malaysia
- List of tourist attractions in Malacca
