= 2025 Malaysia Futsal Cup =

Tournament details
- Dates: Competition proper: 26 July–23 August 2025
- Teams: Competition proper: 8

Final positions
- Champions: Selangor
- Runners-up: Pahang Rangers

Tournament statistics
- Matches played: 14
- Top scorer(s): 13 goals Vítor Campos (Selangor)

The 2025 Malaysia Futsal Cup was the fourth season of the Malaysia Futsal Cup. 8 teams participate in this competition, 6 from the 2025 MPFL Division 1 and 2 from the 2025 MPFL Division 2.

Johor Darul Ta'zim were the defending champions, having beaten Selangor 3–2 in the previous season's final.

== Schedule ==
The schedule of the competition was as follows.

Schedule for 2025 Malaysia Futsal Cup
Phase		Number of fixtures	Date
Competition proper
Quarter-finals	First leg	4	26–28 July 2025
Quarter-finals	Second leg	4	2–3 August 2025
Semi-finals	First leg	2	9 August 2025
Semi-finals	Second leg	2	16 August 2025
Final		1	23 August 2025

== Teams and draw ==
The draw was held on 22 July 2025.

2025 MPFL Division 1 (Division 1)
Rank	Team	Qualification
1	Johor Darul Ta'zim	Qualify
2	Selangor	Qualify
3	Pahang Rangers	Qualify
4	Sabah	Qualify
5	KL City	Qualify
6	TOT United	Qualify
7	Malaysian University	Did not qualify
8	Kedah	Did not qualify

2025 MPFL Division 2 (Division 2)
Rank	Team	Qualification
1	USMKK	Qualify
2	Terengganu	Qualify
3	PFA Odin Sarawak	Did not qualify
4	Pahang Rangers B	Did not qualify
5	Penang	Did not qualify
6	Kelantan FT	Did not qualify
7	Canaan	Did not qualify
8	PJ Champz	Did not qualify
9	ATM	Did not qualify
10	Negeri Sembilan United	Did not qualify
11	Kuala Lumpur 2	Did not qualify
12	Kuala Lumpur 1	Did not qualify

Teams enter the quarter-finals.
Teams did not qualify.

== Bracket ==
Quarterfinals
Terengganu	1	2	3
Pahang Rangers	7	5	12
TOT United	1	0	1
Johor Darul Ta'zim	9	6	15
USMKK	2	3	5
Sabah	4	7	11
KL City	0	1	1
Selangor	8	8	16

Semifinals
Pahang Rangers	2	8	10
Johor Darul Ta'zim	5	4	9
Sabah	2	1	3
Selangor	5	4	9

Finals
Pahang Rangers	3
Selangor	13
Third place
Johor Darul Ta'zim	4
Sabah	3

== Quarter-finals ==
Team 1	Agg.	Team 2	1st leg	2nd leg
Terengganu	3–12	Pahang Rangers	1–7	2–5
TOT United	1–15	Johor Darul Ta'zim	1–9	0–6
USMKK	5–11	Sabah	2–4	3–7
KL City	1–16	Selangor	0–8	1–8

=== Matches ===
First leg

26 July 2025
21:00 UTC+8

Terengganu	1–7	Pahang Rangers
	Report

State Stadium, Kuala Terengganu
Attendance: 400

Second leg

2 Aug 2025
21:00 UTC+8

Pahang Rangers	5–2	Terengganu
	Report

SUKPA Stadium, Kuantan
Attendance: 800

First leg

28 July 2025
20:00 UTC+8

TOT United	1–9	Johor Darul Ta'zim
	Report

Selangor Youth & Sports Complex
Attendance: 150

Second leg

3 Aug 2025
18:00 UTC+8

Johor Darul Ta'zim	6–0	TOT United
	Report

Pasir Gudang Close Stadium, Pasir Gudang
Attendance: 442

First leg

26 July 2025
16:30 UTC+8

USMKK	2–4	Sabah
	Report

State Stadium, Kuala Terengganu
Attendance: 100

Second leg

2 Aug 2025
20:45 UTC+8

Sabah	7–3	USMKK
	Report

Dewan Sri Putatan, Kota Kinabalu
Attendance: 150

First leg

28 July 2025
20:30 UTC+8

KL City	0–8	Selangor
	Report

Selangor Youth & Sports Complex
Attendance: 120

Second leg

2 Aug 2025
20:30 UTC+8

Selangor	8–1	KL City
	Report

Selangor Youth & Sports Complex
Attendance: 248

== Semi-finals ==
Team 1	Agg.	Team 2	1st leg	2nd leg
Pahang Rangers	11–9	Johor Darul Ta'zim	3–5	8–4
Sabah	3–9	Selangor	2–5	1–4

=== Matches ===
9 August 2025
21:00 UTC+8

Pahang Rangers	3–5	Johor Darul Ta'zim
	Report

Sukpa Indoor Stadium, Kuantan
Attendance: 1,600
17 August 2025
18:00 UTC+8

Johor Darul Ta'zim	4–8	Pahang Rangers
	Report

Pasir Gudang City Council Indoor Stadium, Pasir Gudang
Attendance: 800

Pahang Rangers won 11–9 on aggregate.

10 August 2025
20:45 UTC+8

Sabah	2–5	Selangor
	Report

Sri Putatan Indoor Stadium, Kota Kinabalu
Attendance: 150
17 August 2025
20:30 UTC+8

Selangor	4–1	Sabah
	Report

Selangor Youth & Sports Complex, Shah Alam
Attendance: 568

Selangor won 9–3 on aggregate.

== Third place play-off ==
=== Summary ===
Team 1	Score	Team 2
Johor Darul Ta'zim	4–3	Sabah

=== Match ===
23 August 2025
16:00 UTC+8

Johor Darul Ta'zim	4–3	Sabah
Mahadir Harahap 13'; Syed Aizad Daniel 23'; Firdaus Ambiah 37'; Ridzwan Bakri 38'	Report	Nattan Soares 12', 14'; Farith Ahmad 23'

N9 Arena, Nilai
Attendance: 43
Referee: Norafendy Norhayalan

== Final ==
=== Summary ===
Team 1	Score	Team 2
Pahang Rangers	3–13	Selangor

=== Match ===
23 August 2025
20:00 UTC+8

Pahang Rangers	3–13	Selangor
Razin Abdul Rahim 5'; Iqhmal Najmie 38'; Matheus Moura 39'	Report	Vítor Campos 1', 5', 9', 16', 18', 25', 28', 36'; Vandinho 4'; Syahir Iqbal 9', 15'; Faris Johan 18'; Khairul Effendy 26'

N9 Arena, Nilai
Attendance: 2,500
Referee: Muhd Faiz Bin Jamaluddin

== Season statistics ==
Statistics exclude qualifying round. As of 23 August 2025

=== Top goalscorers ===
Rank	Player	Team	Goals
1	(Brazil) Vítor Campos	Selangor	13
2	(Brazil) Borges Evandro	Selangor	7
3	(Malaysia) Awalluddin Mat Nawi	Johor Darul Ta'zim	6
3	(Malaysia) Syahir Iqbal Khan	Selangor	6
5	(Malaysia) Ridzwan Bakri	Johor Darul Ta'zim	5
5	(Malaysia) Harith Na'im	Pahang Rangers	5
5	(Brazil) Felipe Souza	Pahang Rangers	5

== See also ==
- 2025 MPFL Division 1
- 2025 MPFL Division 2
