= 2024 MPFL Division 2 =

1st season of the MPFL Division 2

MPFL Division 2
- Season: 2024
- Dates: 22 June – 4 August
- Champions: Kelantan
- Promoted: Kedah; Malaysian University
- Top goalscorer: 16 goals Ridwan Awaebuesa (Nilai City)
- All statistics correct as of August 2024.

The 2024 MPFL Division 2 was the 1st season of the MPFL Division 2 and the 15th season of the Malaysian futsal league overall. The fixtures were announced on 10 February 2024.

== Promotion and relegation ==
=== From MPFL ===
▲ Promoted to the MPFL Division 1

- (Selangor) Gombak TOT United
- Johor Darul Ta'zim
- (Kuala Lumpur) KL City
- Pahang Rangers
- Sabah
- Selangor
- (Selangor) Shah Alam City
- Terengganu

=== From MPFL ===
▼ Relegated to the MPFL Division 2

- Penang
- ATM
- PFA Odin Sarawak F.C.
- Kedah
- Kuala Lumpur

==== New teams to the MPFL Division 2 ====
- (Kuala Lumpur) Canaan F.C.
- Kelantan
- (Malaysia) Malaysian University
- (Malacca) Melaka
- Negeri Sembilan United F.C.
- (Negeri Sembilan) Nilai City S.C.
- (Selangor) PJ Champz F.C.

==== Team withdrawn ====
- (Malaysia) KPT–PST Mustangs

== Teams ==
Twelve teams will compete in the 2024 MPFL Division 2:

Overview of MPFL Division 2 teams
Team	Location	Stadium	Position in 2023	First season in MPFL
ATM	Kuala Lumpur	Sportizza Setapak & Arena Futsal FAM, Kelana Jaya	5th in Group A	2022
Canaan F.C.	Kuala Lumpur	Sportizza Setapak & Arena Futsal FAM, Kelana Jaya	—	Debut
Kedah	Kuala Lumpur	Sportizza Setapak & Arena Futsal FAM, Kelana Jaya	7th in Group A	2019
Kelantan	Kuala Lumpur	Sportizza Setapak & Arena Futsal FAM, Kelana Jaya	—	2020
Kuala Lumpur	Kuala Lumpur	Sportizza Setapak & Arena Futsal FAM, Kelana Jaya	7th in Group B	2019
Malaysian University	Kuala Lumpur	Sportizza Setapak & Arena Futsal FAM, Kelana Jaya	—	Debut
Melaka	Kuala Lumpur	Sportizza Setapak & Arena Futsal FAM, Kelana Jaya	—	2019
Negeri Sembilan United F.C.	Kuala Lumpur	Sportizza Setapak & Arena Futsal FAM, Kelana Jaya	—	Debut
Nilai City S.C.	Kuala Lumpur	Sportizza Setapak & Arena Futsal FAM, Kelana Jaya	—	Debut
PFA Odin Sarawak F.C.	Kuala Lumpur	Sportizza Setapak & Arena Futsal FAM, Kelana Jaya	6th in Group B	2023
PJ Champz F.C.	Kuala Lumpur	Sportizza Setapak & Arena Futsal FAM, Kelana Jaya	—	Debut
Penang	Kuala Lumpur	Sportizza Setapak & Arena Futsal FAM, Kelana Jaya	Quarter-finalist	2019

=== Personnel ===
Team	Head coach	Captain
ATM	(Malaysia) Izmir Firdaus Zainal Ariff	(Malaysia) Mohd Shamsuri Md. Saleh
Canaan F.C.	(Nigeria) Kelvin Stephen Samuel	(Malaysia) M. Nazri Mohd Yunus
Kedah	(Malaysia) Muhammad Aidiel Boon	(Malaysia) Mohd Fikri Md Rodzi
Kelantan	(Malaysia) Muhammad Fadhil Yusof	(Malaysia) Aqim Mohamad Salihuddin
Kuala Lumpur	(Malaysia) Mohd Ruzaley Abd Aziz	(Malaysia) Aisar Azhar
Malaysian University	(Malaysia) Addy Shairullyzam	(Malaysia) Muhammad Aidil Izwan Mazlan
Melaka	(Malaysia) Mohamad I'sah Abd Rahim	(Malaysia) Najmi Bin Rosli
Negeri Sembilan United F.C.	(Malaysia) Ahmad Fawzul Hadzir	(Malaysia) Muhamad Zulhaikal
Nilai City S.C.	(Malaysia) Mohd Shafik Ezdee	(Malaysia) Raja Muhammad Shamil
PFA Odin Sarawak F.C.	(Malaysia) Mohd Faizal Zamri	(Malaysia) Mohamad Azrin Shahmin
PJ Champz F.C.	(Malaysia) Mohammad Saddam Zolkafle	(Malaysia) Mohamad Fadzil Ab Karnim
Penang	(Malaysia) Hasnizal Hashim	(Malaysia) Muhammad Faizul Azuan

== League table ==
Pos	Team	Pld	W	D	L	GF	GA	GD	Pts	
1	Kelantan (C)	11	10	1	0	49	24	+25	31	Play-off to the 2024 Malaysia Futsal Cup & Withrew next season
2	Kedah (Q, P)	11	7	0	4	44	28	+16	21	Play-off to the 2024 Malaysia Futsal Cup & Promoted to the 2025 MPFL Division 1
3	Penang	11	5	3	3	37	30	+7	18	
4	Malaysian University (P)	11	5	2	4	39	34	+5	17	Promoted to the 2025 MPFL Division 1
5	PFA Odin Sarawak F.C.	11	5	2	4	36	34	+2	17	
6	Canaan F.C.	11	5	2	4	25	27	−2	17	
7	ATM	11	5	0	6	32	31	+1	15	
8	PJ Champz F.C.	11	5	0	6	31	36	−5	15	
9	Nilai City S.C.	11	4	2	5	35	39	−4	14	
10	Negeri Sembilan United F.C.	11	3	3	5	37	43	−6	12	
11	Melaka	11	3	1	7	22	36	−14	10	Withdrawn from MPFL Division 2. (Note: Melaka FA withdrew from MPFL Division 2 before the start of 2025–26 season.)
12	Kuala Lumpur	11	0	2	9	21	46	−25	2	

Updated to match(es) played on 4 August 2024. Source: https://cms.fam.org.my/v1/standings
Rules for classification: 1) Points; 2) Goal difference; 3) Number of goals scored.
(C) Champions; (P) Promoted; (Q) Qualified for the phase indicated

== Season statistics ==
As of 4 August 2024

=== Top goalscorers ===
Rank	Player	Team	Goals
1	(Thailand) Ridwan Awaebuesa	Nilai City	16
2	(Thailand) Nattawat Luksanato	Kedah	15
3	(Malaysia) Raziman Bin Opao	ATM	11
3	(Malaysia) Mohammad Eikmal Daniel	Kedah	11
5	(Malaysia) Ahmad Aqil Khalis	Kelantan	10
5	(Malaysia) Asyraff Bin Zakaris	PFA Odin	10

=== Hat-tricks ===
Player	For	Against	Result	Date
(Thailand) Nattawat Luksanato	Kedah	Nilai City	0–7 (A)	22 June 2024
(Thailand) Nattawat Luksanato	Kedah	Canaan	5–1 (H)	23 June 2024

==== Notes ====
^{4} Player scored four goals
(H) – Home team
(A) – Away team

== See also ==
- 2024 MPFL Division 1
