= MPFL Division 1 =

Malaysian top division men's futsal league

- Organising body: Football Association of Malaysia (FAM)
- Founded: 2019; 7 years ago (as Malaysia Premier Futsal League); 2024; 2 years ago (as MPFL Division 1)
- Country: Malaysia
- Confederation: AFC
- Number of clubs: 8
- Level on pyramid: 1
- Relegation to: MPFL Division 2
- Domestic cup: Malaysia Futsal Cup
- International cup(s): AFC Futsal Club Championship; AFF Futsal Club Championship
- Current champions: Selangor (3rd titles) (2026)
- Most championships: Selangor (3 titles)
- Broadcaster: Astro Arena
- Website: Official website
- Current: 2026 Malaysia Premier Futsal League

The Malaysia Premier Futsal League Division 1, commonly abbreviated as MPFL Division 1, is the highest division of futsal Malaysia, currently contested by 8 teams. Seasons usually run from February to November, with teams meeting each other twice, resulting in a 14-round season for a total of 56 matches. The MPFL Division 2 is the national second-level competition.

== Competition format ==
Each team can register only two imported players. A total of 14 imported players were introduced - 11 from Brazil, 1 from Indonesia, South Korea and Afghanistan.

== Current teams ==
The following eight teams competed in MPFL Division 1 during the 2025 season. 4 teams are from the Klang Valley.

Team	Location	Stadium	2024 Position	First season	Head coach
Johor Darul Ta'zim	Johor Bahru	Pasir Gudang City Indoor Stadium	1st	2023	(Spain) Juan Antonio Miguel Garcia
Kedah	Alor Setar	Sultan Abdul Halim Indoor Stadium	2nd	2019	(Malaysia) Muhammad Aidiel Boon
KL City	Kuala Lumpur	ISN Raja Muda Sports Complex	8th	2019	(Malaysia) Jerry Dinesh Pireira
Malaysian University	Kuala Lumpur	Selangor Youth & Sports Complex	4th	2024	(Malaysia) Addy Shairyllyzam Shafiee
Pahang Rangers	Kuantan	Sukpa Indoor Stadium	3rd	2019	(Spain) Luis Fonseca Cilleros
Sabah	Kota Kinabalu	Sri Putatan Hall	5th	2023	(Spain) Nacho Garrido Gallego
Selangor (Note: Formerly known as Selangor MAC)	Shah Alam	Panasonic Sport Complex	2nd	2019	(Brazil) Edgar Eder Baldasso
TOT United (Note: Formerly known as Selangor TOT United)	Kuala Lumpur	Ortuseight Arena	6th	2022	(Malaysia) Fitri Muhamad Yatim

== Results ==
Season	Champions	Runners-up	Third place
National Futsal League (2004–2018)
2004	PDRM	Johor	MAKSAK
2005–06	AOB Teras Selatan	MPSJ	MBAS
2007	Johor	MAKSAK	Selangor
2008–09	Figos RSA	Selangor	Pahang
2009–10	Figos RSA	T–Team	Pahang
2010–11	Selangor FA	Johor	Felda United
2011–12	PKNS	MPSJ	Pahang
2013–14	Felda United	MPSJ	Pahang
2014–15	Felda United	T-Team	MK Land
2017	Melaka United	FELDA United	Pahang
2018	Melaka United	Perak	Pahang
Malaysia Premier Futsal League (2019–2023)
2019	Selangor MAC	Pahang Rangers	Terengganu
2020	cancelled due to COVID-19 pandemic		
2021	cancelled due to COVID-19 pandemic		
2022	Selangor MAC	Pahang Rangers	Negeri Sembilan
2023 (Note: In the 2023 season, the league format was changed. Therefore, the teams eliminated in the semi-finals will be counted as third-placed.)	Pahang Rangers	Johor Darul Ta'zim	Selangor MAC Selangor TOT United
Malaysia Premier Futsal League Division 1 (2024–2025)
2024	Johor Darul Ta'zim	Selangor	Pahang Rangers
2025	Johor Darul Ta'zim	Selangor	Pahang Rangers
Malaysia Premier Futsal League (2026–)
2026	Selangor	Pahang Rangers	Johor Darul Ta'zim Terengganu

== Performance by clubs ==
Since its establishment, the MPFL has been won by 10 different teams. Teams shown in italics no longer exist or no longer compete in the competition.

Club	Titles	Runners-up	Winning seasons	Years runners-up
Selangor	3	2	2019, 2022, 2026	2024, 2025
Johor Darul Ta'zim	2	2	2024, 2025	2010–11, 2023
(Federal Territories of Malaysia) FELDA United	2	1	2013–14, 2014–15	2017
(Kuala Lumpur) Figos RSA	2	0	2008–09, 2009–10	—N/a
(Malacca) Melaka United	2	0	2017 , 2018	—N/a
Pahang Rangers	1	3	2023	2019, 2022, 2026
Johor FA	1	1	2007	2004
Selangor FA	1	1	2010–11	2008–09
(Malaysia) PDRM	1	0	2004	—N/a
(Johor) AOB Teras Selatan	1	0	2005–06	—N/a
(Selangor) PKNS FC	1	0	2011–12	—N/a
(Selangor) MPSJ F.C.	0	3	—N/a	2005–06, 2011–12, 2013–14
(Terengganu) T–Team	0	2	—N/a	2009–10, 2014–15
(Malaysia) MAKSAK	0	1	—N/a	2007
Perak FA	0	1	—N/a	2018

== All-time table ==
Last updated following the 2024 season

The all-time MPFL Division 1 table is a cumulative record of all match results, points and goals of every team that has played in the league since 2019. Numbers in bold are the record in each column.

Pos.	Team	Seasons	Pld	W	D	L	GF	GA	GD	Pts	PPG	Debut
1	**Selangor**	**5**	61	**49**	5	7	274	127	147	**152**	2.49	2019
2	**Pahang Rangers**	**5**	**63**	45	**10**	8	**312**	150	**162**	145	2.30	2019
3	Terengganu	**5**	59	27	7	25	201	207	–6	88	1.49	2019
4	**Johor Darul Ta'zim**	2	32	28	1	3	184	63	121	85	**2.66**	2023
5	Penang	4	45	22	4	19	154	156	–2	70	1.56	2019
6	**TOT United**	3	44	20	2	22	159	122	37	62	1.41	2022
7	Shah Alam City	3	42	18	5	19	148	141	7	59	1.40	2022
8	**Kedah**	4	43	11	**10**	22	119	157	–38	43	1.00	2019
9	**KL City**	**5**	57	10	7	**40**	139	**201**	–62	37	0.65	2019
10	Negeri Sembilan	2	15	10	2	3	52	29	23	32	2.13	2020
11	Perak	3	31	9	4	18	99	134	−35	31	1.00	2019
12	Kuala Lumpur	4	43	8	6	29	90	208	–118	30	0.70	2019
13	**Sabah**	2	28	9	1	18	86	134	–48	28	1.00	2023
14	KPT–PST Mustangs F.C.	3	27	8	2	17	61	85	–24	26	0.96	2020
15	PDRM	1	14	7	2	5	54	40	14	23	1.64	2022
16	Kelantan	2	15	6	3	6	45	43	2	21	1.40	2020
17	ATM	2	26	6	1	19	70	135	–65	19	0.73	2022
18	Melaka	1	16	4	4	8	40	47	–7	16	1.00	2019
19	PFA Odin Sarawak	1	12	1	2	9	28	67	–39	5	0.42	2023
20	Sarawak	1	1	0	0	1	1	9	–8	0	0.00	2020
21	**Malaysian University**	1	11	5	2	4	39	34	5	0	0.00	2024

== Titles by head coaches ==
Head coach	Nat.	Titles	Team(s)	Winning seasons
Addy Shairullyzam	(Malaysia)	2	Selangor	2019, 2022
Juan Antonio Miguel Garcia	(Spain)	2	Johor Darul Ta'zim	2024, 2025
Gerard Casas Ullastre	(Spain)	1	Pahang Rangers	2023
Edgar Eder Baldasso	(Brazil)	1	Selangor	2026

== Awards ==
=== Prize money ===
As of 2026 season

- Champion: RM 40,000
- Runner-up: RM 20,000

=== Top goalscorers ===
Season	Player	Team	Goals
2019	(Malaysia) Saiful Nizam	Pahang Rangers	18
2019	(Malaysia) Ridzwan Bakri	Perak	18
2019	(Malaysia) Fariq Mohammad	Selangor MAC	18
2022	(Malaysia) Ekmal Shahrin	Selangor MAC	14
2022	(Brazil) Silva Matheus Vasconcelos	Selangor MAC	14
2023	(Iran) Ali Ebrahimi	Selangor MAC	22
2024	(Brazil) Felipe De Souza	Pahang Rangers	24
2025	(Brazil) Vitor Fernandes	Selangor	29
2026	(Brazil) Felipe Souza	Pahang Rangers	39

=== Most Valuable Player ===
Season	Player	Team
2023	(Malaysia) Harith Na'im Nasir	Pahang Rangers
2024	(Malaysia) Mohd Firdaus Ambiah	Johor Darul Ta'zim
2025	(Brazil) Bruno Taffy	Johor Darul Ta'zim
2026	(Brazil) Marlon Araújo	Selangor

=== Best goalkeeper ===
Season	Player	Team
2023	(Malaysia) Zainulzahin Sinuan	Pahang Rangers
2024	(Malaysia) Aiman Fikry Ramli	Johor Darul Ta'zim
2025	(Malaysia) Azrul Hadee	Johor Darul Ta'zim
2026	(Malaysia) Afiq Abdul Rahman	Pahang Rangers

== See also ==
- Malaysia national futsal team
