= 2025 MPFL Division 2 =

1st season of the MPFL Division 2

MPFL Division 2
- Season: 2025
- Dates: 24 May – 13 July
- Champions: USMKK F.C.
- Promoted: USMKK F.C. Terengganu
- Matches: 66
- Top goalscorer: Asyraff Zakaris
- All statistics correct as of 21 July 2025.

The 2025 MPFL Division 2 was the 2nd season of the MPFL Division 2 and the 16th season of the Malaysian futsal league overall. The fixtures were announced on 18 April 2025. Kelantan are the defending champions.

== Competition format ==
The tournament will be played in a single-league format, where each team will face every other team at home and away in a round-robin fashion. Top two in the league will be play in Qualifying play-off to 2025 Malaysia Futsal Cup and end of season team that tops the standings after all league matches will be crowned as champions and promotion to MPFL Division 1.

== Promotion and relegation ==
=== To MPFL Division 2 ===
▼ Relegated from the MPFL Division 1

- Terengganu

New team

- Kelantan FT
- Pahang Rangers B
- Kuala Lumpur 2
- (Kelantan) USMKK F.C.

=== From MPFL Division 2 ===
▲ Promoted to the MPFL Division 1

- Kedah
- (Malaysia) Malaysian University

==== Team withdrawn ====
- Kelantan ^{^{1}}
- (Malacca) Melaka

Notes:

^1 Not allowed to compete because the parent team was suspended.

== Teams ==
13 teams will compete in the 2025 MPFL Division 2:

Overview of MPFL Division 2 teams
Team	Location	Stadium	Position in 2024	First season in MPFL
ATM	Kelana Jaya	Arena Futsal FAM, Kelana Jaya	7th place	2022
(Kuala Lumpur) Canaan	Kelana Jaya	Arena Futsal FAM, Kelana Jaya	6th place	2024
Kelantan FT	Kelana Jaya	Arena Futsal FAM, Kelana Jaya	—	Debut
Kuala Lumpur 1	Kelana Jaya	Arena Futsal FAM, Kelana Jaya	12th place	2019
Kuala Lumpur 2	Kelana Jaya	Arena Futsal FAM, Kelana Jaya	—	Debut
Negeri Sembilan United	Kelana Jaya	Arena Futsal FAM, Kelana Jaya	10th place	2024
(Negeri Sembilan) Nilai City	Kelana Jaya	Arena Futsal FAM, Kelana Jaya	9th place	2024
Pahang Rangers B	Kelana Jaya	Arena Futsal FAM, Kelana Jaya	—	Debut
PFA Odin Sarawak	Kelana Jaya	Arena Futsal FAM, Kelana Jaya	5th place	2023
(Selangor) PJ Champz	Kelana Jaya	Arena Futsal FAM, Kelana Jaya	8th place	2024
Penang	Kelana Jaya	Arena Futsal FAM, Kelana Jaya	3rd place	2019
Terengganu	Kelana Jaya	Arena Futsal FAM, Kelana Jaya	7th place	2024
(Kelantan) USMKK	Kelana Jaya	Arena Futsal FAM, Kelana Jaya	—	Debut

=== Personnel ===
Team	Head coach	Captain	Kit manufacturer	Sponsor
ATM	(Malaysia) Izmir Firdaus Zainal Ariff	(Malaysia) Mohd Shamsuri Md. Saleh	Pivo	The Gladiator
Canaan	(Nigeria) Kelvin Stephen Samuel	(Malaysia) M. Nazri Mohd Yunus	Alpha Sports	N/A
Kelantan FT	(Malaysia) Muhammad Fadhil Yusoff	(Malaysia) Aqim Salihuddin	AUSS Apparel	AUSS
Kuala Lumpur 1	(Malaysia) Mohammad Saddam Zolkafle	(Malaysia) Aisar Azhar	Lotto	N/A
Kuala Lumpur 2	(Malaysia) Mohd Ruzaley Abdul Aziz	(Malaysia) Imran khairi Abdullah	Kelme	N/A
Negeri Sembilan United	(Malaysia) Ahmad Fawzul Hadzir	(Malaysia) Muhamad Zulhaikal	TAFT Printing	TAFT Printing
Nilai City	(Malaysia) Mohd Shafik Ezdee	(Malaysia) Raja Muhammad Shamil	Figos	AZ Printing
Pahang Rangers B	(Malaysia) Iqbal Aikal Mohd Noor.	(Malaysia) Megat Adam Faizahan	Ortuseight	N/A
PFA Odin Sarawak	(Malaysia) Mohd Faizal Zamri	(Malaysia) Azrin Shahmin Jefery	Figos	Odin Group
PJ Champz	(Malaysia) Mohammad Taufik Yaiyah	(Malaysia) Mohamad Fadzil Ab Karnim	D'mensi Legacy	Able Farm
Penang	(Malaysia) Hashim Ahmad Rashidi	(Malaysia) Ismail Mohd Azwann	Puma	Activesports / TRA Xpress
Terengganu	(Malaysia) Jamhuri Zainuddin	(Malaysia) Syed Shahrul Niezam	Mizuno	AQM Agro Tech
USMKK	(Malaysia) Mohd Yuzmuhaimizee Yaacob	(Malaysia) Farisa Sharif	Regles Apparel	Regles / Zasma

== League table ==
Pos	Team	Pld	W	D	L	GF	GA	GD	Pts	
1	USMKK (C)	11	8	2	1	45	28	+17	26	Advanced to the 2025 Malaysia Futsal Cup & Promoted to the MPFL
2	Terengganu	11	8	1	2	43	14	+29	25	Advanced to the 2025 Malaysia Futsal Cup & Promoted to the MPFL
3	PFA Odin Sarawak	11	7	2	2	38	31	+7	23	Promoted to the MPFL
4	Pahang Rangers B	11	7	1	3	44	19	+25	22	Ineligible for Promotion (Note: Cannot promotion because parent team Pahang Rangers plays in the MPFL Division 1)
5	Penang	11	7	1	3	36	30	+6	22	
6	Kelantan FT	11	6	1	4	34	28	+6	19	
7	Canaan	11	4	3	4	23	25	−2	15	
8	PJ Champz	11	3	2	6	24	26	−2	11	
9	ATM	11	3	1	7	24	34	−10	10	Promoted to the MPFL
10	Negeri Sembilan United	11	2	2	7	21	31	−10	8	
11	Kuala Lumpur 2	11	2	1	8	27	45	−18	7	
12	Kuala Lumpur 1	11	0	1	10	14	62	−48	1	
13	Nilai City	0	0	0	0	0	0	0	0	Withdrew (Note: Withdrew from MPFL Division 1)

Updated to match(es) played on 21 July 2025. Source: FAM-CMS
Rules for classification: 1) Points; 2) Goal difference; 3) Number of goals scored.
(C) Champions

== Results table ==
Home \ Away	ATM	CAN	KEL	KL1	KL2	NIL	NSE	PAH	PEN	PFA	PJC	TER	USM
ATM		-	3–6	-	1–5		2–1	3–3	-	1–2	0–3	-	-
Canaan F.C.	2–4		-	3–3	-	1–3	-	-	1–6	-	-	1–0	2–2
Kelantan FT	-	2–1		-	3–1		0–4	1–4	-	-	5–3	-	-
Kuala Lumpur 1	1–8	-	0–5		1–4		-	0–9	-	2–5	-	-	-
Kuala Lumpur 2	-	-	-	-			3–3	2–5	2–4	-	2–6	-	3–5
Nilai City S.C.	2–2		0–4				2–6			1–2			
Negeri Sembilan United F.C.	-	0–1	-	6–2	-			-	1–2	-	2–2	0–5	1–4
Pahang Rangers B	-	4–2	-	-	-		6–0		1–3	-	-	6–1	2–4
Penang	4–1	-	-	7–3	-	5–0	-	-		5–5	-	0–2	2–9
PFA Odin Sarawak F.C.	-	-	4–2	-	-		4–3	3–1	-		3–1	-	-
PJ Champz F.C.	-	1–1	-	4–0	-	3–4	-	-	1–3	-		1–4	2–3
Terengganu	-	-	3–3	6–1	8–1		-	-	-	4–1	-		-
USMKK F.C.	2–1	-	5–3	5–1	-		-	-	-	-	-	0–5	

Updated to match(es) played on 6 July 2025. Source: https://cms.fam.org.my/v1/results
Legend: Blue = home team win; Yellow = draw; Red = away team win.

== Season statistics ==
=== Top goalscorers ===
As of 15 June 2025

Rank	Player	Club	Goals
1	(Malaysia) Izzat Aqiyudin Ramli	Kelantan FT	6
2	(Malaysia) Asyraff Zakaris	PFA Odin Sarawak	5
2	(Malaysia) Muhammad Hafiz Jaafar	PJ Champz	5
2	(Malaysia) Muhammad Amirul Syahmi	USMKK	5
5	(Malaysia) Raziman Opao	ATM	4
5	(Malaysia) Daniel Haikal Samsudin	Negeri Sembilan United	4
5	(Malaysia) Sufiyan Abdul Halim	Nilai City	4
5	(Malaysia) Mohd Syafiq Hamzah	PFA Odin Sarawak	4
5	(Malaysia) Radzi Muhammad Amirul	Penang	4
5	(Malaysia) Mohd Hafizi Ismail	Terengganu	4
5	(Malaysia) Faris Iman Mahdi	Terengganu	4
12	8 players	11 clubs	3
13	22 players	11 clubs	2
14	46 players	13 clubs	1

=== Hat-tricks ===
As of 15 June 2025

Player	For	Against	Result	Date
(Malaysia) Muhammad Hafiz Jaafar ^{4}	PJ Champz	Kuala Lumpur 1	4–0 (H)	1 June 2025
(Malaysia) Muhd Amirul Md Radzi	Penang	Kuala Lumpur 1	7–3 (H)	14 June 2025
(Malaysia) Asyraff Zakaris	PFA Odin Sarawak	Negeri Sembilan United	4–3 (H)	14 June 2025
(Malaysia) Izzat Aqiyudin Ramli	Kelantan FT	Kuala Lumpur 1	0–5 (A)	15 June 2025
(Malaysia) Faris Iman Mahdi	Terengganu	Kuala Lumpur 2	8–1 (H)	15 June 2025

Note: ^{4} – player scored 4 goals
Note: ^{5} – player scored 5 goals

== See also ==
- 2025 MPFL Division 1
