= Abu Haniffa Hasan =

Malaysia futsal player

Personal information
- Full name: Abu Haniffa bin Hasan
- Date of birth: 22 February 1991 (age 35)
- Place of birth: Melaka, Malaysia
- Height: 1.75 m (5 ft 9 in)
- Position: Pivot

Team information
- Current team: Johor Darul Takzim
- Number: 2

Youth career
- 2012–2013: MSSN Negeri Sembilan

Senior career*
Years	Team	Apps	(Gls)
2014–2016	Felda United	?	(?)
2017–2019	Melaka United	36	(8)
2019–2022	Pahang Rangers	26	(10)
2023–	Johor Darul Takzim	18	(16)

International career^{‡}
2017–2018	Malaysia Futsal U20	8	(9)
2017–	Malaysia Futsal	50+	(13)
Medal record
Malaysia national futsal team
OFC Futsal Championship
Silver medal – second place	New Zealand 2013	Futsal
SEA Games
Silver medal – second place	Kuala Lumpur 2017	Futsal
AFF Futsal Championship
Bronze medal – third place	Bangkok 2015	Futsal
Bronze medal – third place	Bangkok 2016	Futsal
Silver medal – second place	Ho Chi Minh 2017	Futsal
Silver medal – second place	Yogyakarta 2018	Futsal
- * Club domestic league appearances and goals as of 14 August 2023 ‡ National team caps and goals as of 14 June 2023

Abu Haniffa bin Hasan (born 22 February 1991) is a Malaysian international futsal player. He currently plays for JDT Futsal in the Malaysia Premier Futsal League, the premier professional futsal league in Malaysia, and capped by Malaysian national team.

== Early life and education ==
Abu Haniffa Hasan was born in Melaka, Malaysia. His parents both worked as civil servants in the Malaysia government.

He started his futsal career at early stage when he was in secondary school. Playing at futsal court in Melaka with his fellow friends. He was talent spotted by a coach and was later invited to play for Negeri Sembilan's State Sports Council.

== Career ==
Abu Haniffa Hasan played for Felda United, Melaka United, Pahang Rangers, and currently he plays for Johor Darul Takzim.

At international level, he is a member of Malaysian Futsal national team. He won the silver medal at the 2017 AFF Futsal Championship and 2018 AFF Futsal Championship and bronze medal at the 2015 AFF Futsal Championship and 2016 AFF Futsal Championship. He also part of the team at 2022 AFF Futsal Championship

== Honours ==
Felda United

- Liga Futsal Kebangsaan
  - Winner (2) : 2013–14, 2014–15
- AFF Futsal Club Championship
  - 1st Runners up (2) : 2014, 2015

Melaka United

- Liga Futsal Kebangsaan
  - Winner (2) : 2017, 2018
- AFF Futsal Club Championship
  - Third place (1) : 2017

Pahang Rangers

- Malaysia Premier Futsal League
  - Runners Up (2) : 2019, 2022
- Malaysia Futsal Cup
  - Runners Up (1) : 2022

Johor Darul Takzim

- Malaysia Premier Futsal League
  - Winner (1) : 2024, 2025
  - Runners Up : 2023
- Malaysia Futsal Cup
  - Winner (1) : 2024

International

- AFF Futsal Championship
  - 1st Runners Up (2): 2017, 2018
  - Third Place (2) : 2015, 2016
- SEA Games
  - 1st Runners Up (1): 2017
- OFC Futsal Championship
  - 1st Runners Up (1): 2013

Individual

- Most Valuable Player : 2017, 2018, 2020, 2022
