= 2024 MPFL Division 1 =

1st season of the MPFL Division 1

MPFL Division 1
- Season: 2024
- Dates: 17 February 2024 – 11 August 2024
- Champions: Johor Darul Ta'zim; 1st MPFL Division 1 title.
- Relegated: Shah Alam City; Terengganu
- Matches played: 56
- Goals scored: 442 (7.89 per match)
- Top goalscorer: Felipe De Souza (24 goals)
- Biggest home win: Pahang Rangers 10–0 Terengganu (1 June 2024)
- Biggest away win: Terengganu 0–8 Shah Alam City (17 February 2024)
- Highest scoring: Pahang Rangers 8–6 Gombak TOT United (17 March 2024)
- Longest winning run: 10 matches Selangor
- Longest unbeaten run: 10 matches Selangor
- Longest winless run: 14 matches KL City
- Longest losing run: 14 matches KL City
- Highest attendance: 2,697; Pahang Rangers 8–4 Selangor (25 February 2024)
- Lowest attendance: 80; Selangor 8–1 Terengganu (20 April 2024); Sabah 6–1 KL City (13 July 2024)
- Total attendance: 27,707
- Average attendance: 495

The 2024 MPFL Division 1 was the 4th completed season of the MPFL Division 1 and the 14th season of the Malaysian futsal league overall. The fixtures were announced on 10 February 2024. The season began on 17 February 2024, and concluded on 11 August 2024. Pahang Rangers are the defending champions.

Johor Darul Ta'zim emerged as the 2024 MPFL Division 1 champions by recording 13 wins and only one loss, accumulating a total of 39 points in a two-round league format (home and away) competition involving eight teams. After securing the title with one game remaining by defeating KL City FC 9–2 in the 13th match of the season, Juan Antonio Miguel Garcia's JDT closed the league competition with a 3–0 victory over Gombak TOT United FC at the Pasir Gudang City Stadium.

== Promotion and relegation ==
=== From MPFL ===
▲ Promoted to the MPFL Division 1

- Gombak TOT United
- Johor Darul Ta'zim
- KL City
- Pahang Rangers
- Sabah
- Selangor
- Shah Alam City
- Terengganu

▼ Relegated to the MPFL Division 2

- Penang
- ATM
- PFA Odin Sarawak F.C.
- Kedah
- Kuala Lumpur

==== Team withdrawn ====
- KPT–PST Mustangs

== Teams ==
=== Stadiums and locations ===
Team	Location	Stadium
Gombak TOT United	Shah Alam	Panasonic Sport Complex
Johor Darul Ta'zim	Johor Bahru	Pasir Gudang Indoor Stadium
KL City	Kuala Lumpur	Ortuseight Arena
Pahang Rangers	Kuantan	Sukpa Indoor Stadium
Sabah	Shah Alam	Panasonic Sport Complex
Selangor	Shah Alam	Panasonic Sport Complex
Shah Alam City	Shah Alam	Panasonic Sport Complex
Terengganu	Kuala Terengganu	Kuala Terengganu State Stadium

=== Personnel ===
Team	Head coach	Captain
Gombak TOT United	(Malaysia) Qusmaini Noor Rusli	(Malaysia) Faisal Saharudin
Johor Darul Ta'zim	(Spain) Juan Antonio Miguel Garcia	(Malaysia) Firdaus Ambiah
KL City	(Malaysia) Jerry Dinesh Pireira	(Malaysia) Muzhaffar Tahar
Pahang Rangers	(Spain) Gerard Casas Ullastre	(Malaysia) Akmarulnizam
Sabah	(Thailand) Patt Sriwijit	(Malaysia) Akmal Hakimi
Selangor	(Brazil) Edgar Eder Baldasso	(Malaysia) Fariq Mohammad
Shah Alam City	(Malaysia) Muizzudin Haris	(Malaysia) Syahman Idris
Terengganu	(Malaysia) Mohd Rozairi Ahmad	(Malaysia) Syed Shahrul Niezam

== League table ==
Pos	Team	Pld	W	D	L	GF	GA	GD	Pts	
1	Johor Darul Ta'zim (C)	14	13	0	1	72	25	+47	39	Qualification to the AFF Futsal Club Championship
2	Selangor	14	11	0	3	65	35	+30	33	
3	Pahang Rangers	14	9	1	4	81	51	+30	28	
4	Shah Alam City	14	6	3	5	68	52	+16	21	Withdrawn from MPFL Division 1 and dissolved. (Note: Shah Alam City withdrew from MPFL Division 1 before the start of 2025–26 season.)
5	Sabah	14	5	1	8	46	61	−15	16	
6	Gombak TOT United	14	5	0	9	45	63	−18	15	
7	Terengganu	14	4	1	9	35	74	−39	13	Play-off to the 2024 Malaysia Futsal Cup & Relegated to the 2025 MPFL Division 2
8	KL City	14	0	0	14	30	81	−51	0	Play-off to the 2024 Malaysia Futsal Cup

Updated to match(es) played on 11 August 2024. Source: https://cms.fam.org.my/v1/standings
Rules for classification: 1) Points; 2) Goal difference; 3) Number of goals scored.
(C) Champions

== Positions by round ==
Team ╲ Round	1	2	3	4	5	6	7	8	9	10	11	12	13	14
Johor Darul Ta'zim	1	1	1	1	1	1	1	1	1	1	1	1	1	1
Selangor	6	7	5	6	4	4	4	4	3	2	2	2	2	2
Pahang Rangers	4	3	2	2	2	2	2	2	2	3	3	3	3	3
Shah Alam City	5	2	4	3	3	3	3	3	4	4	4	4	4	4
Sabah	3	4	6	4	5	5	5	5	5	5	5	6	5	5
Gombak TOT United	8	6	3	5	6	6	6	6	6	6	6	5	6	6
Terengganu	2	5	7	7	7	7	7	7	7	7	7	7	7	7
KL City	7	8	8	8	8	8	8	8	8	8	8	8	8	8

League leader

Source: https://cms.fam.org.my/v1/standings

== Results ==
Home \ Away	GTU	JDT	KLC	PAH	SAB	SEL	SAC	TER
Gombak TOT United	—	1–6	5–4	4–3	2–3	2–3	0–6	4–2
Johor Darul Ta'zim	3–0	—	9–2	4–3	2–0	4–2	6–5	8–1
KL City	3–5	1–4	—	0–6	5–6	2–5	3–8	2–3
Pahang Rangers	8–6	4–5	6–2	—	4–3	8–4	6–2	10–0
Sabah	5–7	2–9	6–1	5–7	—	1–4	2–6	2–5
Selangor	6–1	2–1	6–1	6–5	2–3	—	6–3	8–1
Shah Alam City	6–5	1–4	6–3	6–6	2–2	2–5	—	4–4
Terengganu	5–3	1–7	6–1	1–5	5–6	1–6	0–8	—

Updated to match(es) played on 11 August 2024. Source: https://cms.fam.org.my/v1/results
Legend: Blue = home team win; Yellow = draw; Red = away team win.

== Results by round ==
Team ╲ Round	1	2	3	4	5	6	7	8	9	10	11	12	13	14
Gombak TOT United	L	W	W	L	L	W	L	L	L	W	L	W	L	L
Johor Darul Ta'zim	W	W	W	W	W	W	W	W	W	L	W	W	W	W
KL City	L	L	L	L	L	L	L	L	L	L	L	L	L	L
Pahang Rangers	D	W	W	W	W	L	W	L	W	L	W	L	W	W
Sabah	W	L	L	W	L	W	L	W	L	W	L	L	D	L
Selangor	L	L	W	L	W	W	W	W	W	W	W	W	W	W
Shah Alam City	D	W	L	W	W	L	W	W	L	D	W	L	D	L
Terengganu	W	L	L	L	L	L	L	L	W	D	L	W	L	W

Updated to match(es) played on 11 August 2024. Source: https://cms.fam.org.my/v1/results

== Season statistics ==
=== Top goalscorers ===
Rank	Player	Team	Goals
1	(Brazil) Felipe De Souza	Pahang Rangers	24
2	(Brazil) Isayas Figueiredo	Shah Alam City	23
3	(Brazil) Well Pereira	Selangor	15
3	(Indonesia) Guntur Sulistyo	Pahang Rangers	15
5	(Brazil) Murilo Saad	Pahang Rangers	13
6	(Malaysia) Ridzwan Bakri	Johor Darul Ta'zim	12
6	(Malaysia) Syahir Iqbal	Selangor	12
6	(Malaysia) Zainal Abidin Hamzah	Shah Alam City	12
9	(Malaysia) Harith Na'im Nasir	Pahang Rangers	11
10	(Malaysia) Abu Haniffa Hassan	Johor Darul Ta'zim	10
10	(Malaysia) Saad Sani	Johor Darul Ta'zim	10
10	(Malaysia) Khairul Effendy	Selangor	10
10	(Brazil) Gabriel Rosa	Selangor	10

=== Hat-tricks ===
Player	For	Against	Result	Date
(Malaysia) Harith Na'im Nasir	Pahang Rangers	Shah Alam City	6–6 (A)	17 February 2024
(Malaysia) Saad Sani	Johor Darul Ta'zim	Gombak TOT United	6–1 (A)	17 February 2024
(Indonesia) Guntur Sulistyo^{4}	Gombak TOT United	Sabah	7–5 (A)	24 February 2024
(Brazil) Felipe De Souza	Pahang Rangers	Selangor	8–4 (H)	25 February 2024
(Malaysia) Hamidin Zarif Mahmun	Pahang Rangers	Selangor	8–4 (H)	25 February 2024
(Brazil) Isayas Figueiredo	Shah Alam City	KL City	8–3 (A)	25 February 2024
(Brazil) Felipe De Souza	Pahang Rangers	Sabah	7–5 (A)	10 March 2024
(Malaysia) Hamidin Zarif Mahmun	Pahang Rangers	Gombak TOT United	8–6 (H)	17 March 2024
(Brazil) Well Pereira	Selangor	Terengganu	8–1 (H)	20 April 2024
(Malaysia) Aliff Mohd Roslan	Shah Alam City	Gombak TOT United	6–0 (A)	12 May 2024
(Brazil) Murilo Saad	Pahang Rangers	KL City	6–2 (A)	18 May 2024
(Brazil) Isayas Figueiredo	Shah Alam City	Sabah	6–2 (A)	1 June 2024
(Malaysia) Saiful Nizam	Pahang Rangers	Terengganu	10–0 (H)	1 June 2024
(Malaysia) Awalluddin Mat Nawi	Johor Darul Ta'zim	Terengganu	7–1 (A)	3 July 2024
(Brazil) Lucas Nakazato	Sabah	KL City	6–1 (H)	13 July 2024
(Brazil) Felipe De Souza	Pahang Rangers	KL City	6–0 (A)	20 July 2024
(Brazil) Isayas Figueiredo	Shah Alam City	Gombak TOT United	6–5 (H)	21 July 2024
(Malaysia) Ridzwan Bakri	Johor Darul Ta'zim	Pahang Rangers	5–4 (A)	27 July 2024
(Malaysia) Habibi Sultan	Gombak TOT United	KL City	5–4 (H)	28 July 2024
(Brazil) Felipe De Souza^{4}	Pahang Rangers	Shah Alam City	6–5 (H)	10 August 2024

==== Notes ====
^{4} Player scored four goals
(H) – Home team
(A) – Away team

=== Awards ===
Award	Winner	Team
MPFL Division 1 Most Valuable Player	(Malaysia) Mohd Firdaus Ambiah	Johor Darul Ta'zim
MPFL Division 1 Top Goalscorer	(Brazil) Felipe De Souza	Pahang Rangers
MPFL Division 1 Best Goalkeeper	(Malaysia) Aiman Fikry Ramli	Johor Darul Ta'zim

== See also ==
- 2024 MPFL Division 2
