= 2026 Malaysia Premier Futsal League =

7th season of the Malaysia Premier Futsal League

Malaysia Premier Futsal League
- Season: 2026
- Dates: 16 May – 31 October 2026
- Champions: Selangor
- Matches: 31
- Top goalscorer: Felipe Souza (Pahang Rangers, 39 goals)
- Biggest home win: Pahang Rangers 19–2 Wipers
- Biggest away win: Wipers 0–13 Selangor
- Highest scoring: Pahang Rangers 19–2 Wipers

The 2026 season was the 7th season of the Malaysia Premier Futsal League (MPFL) and the 17th season of the Malaysian futsal league overall. The Malaysia Premier Futsal League is contested by 9 teams. The season began on 16 May, and concluded on 31 October 2026. Johor Darul Ta'zim were the defending champions.

== Rule & format ==
The Malaysia Premier Futsal League (MPFL) 2026 introduces a new centralized carnival format, merging Division 1 and Division 2 into a single unified league. The season runs from 16 May to 31 October 2026 and features 9 competing teams.

1. League Stage (Preliminary Round):

- Single Division: No more separation between Division 1 and Division 2. All teams compete in one league.
- Double Round-Robin: Every team plays 16 matches in total (home and away simulation).
- Carnival Concept (Circuits): Traditional home-and-away travel is replaced by a "Turn Up & Play" system. Matches are held across 9 circuits at three main centralized venues:
  - Pasir Gudang City Council Indoor Stadium, Pasir Gudang, Johor
  - Panasonic Sports Complex, Shah Alam, Selangor
  - Sukpa Stadium, Kuantan, Pahang
- Double Headers: Each team plays two matches over a single tournament weekend.

2. Knockout Stage (Play-offs & Finals): The championship series has been restructured for high-stakes drama:

- Automatic Qualification: The top two teams at the end of the league stage qualify directly for the Semi-finals.
- Play-off Round: The remaining two semi-final spots are decided by a play-off between teams finishing 3rd to 6th.
  - 3rd place vs. 6th place.
  - 4th place vs. 5th place.
- New Semi-final Rule: Teams must win both legs to advance to the Final:
  - Aggregate goals do not matter. If Team A wins the first match and Team B wins the second match, the tie goes straight to extra time and penalties during the second leg.

== Team changes ==
The following teams have changed division since the 2025 season.

=== To the Malaysia Premier Futsal League ===
From the MPFL Division 2

- USMKK
- Terengganu
- PFA Odin Sarawak
- ATM

New Team

- Wipers

=== From the Malaysia Premier Futsal League ===
Withdrawn

- Sabah
- TOT United
- Malaysian University
- Kedah

=== Personnel, kit and sponsoring ===
Team	Head coach	Captain	Kit manufacturer	Sponsor
ATM	(Malaysia) Izmir Firdaus Zainal Ariff	(Malaysia) Mohd Shamsuri bin Saleh	Pivo	
Johor Darul Ta'zim	(Spain) João Nuno Alves de Almeida	(Malaysia) Mohd Firdaus Ambiah	Nike	Toyota
KL City	(Malaysia) Jerry Dinesh Pireira	(Malaysia) Dinesh Kumar a/l Kumaran Raja	Hundred	N/A
Pahang Rangers	(Spain) Eloy Alonso Fraile	(Malaysia) Kamarulnizam bin Mohd Idris	Ortuseight	Platinum Victory
PFA Odin Sarawak	(Malaysia) Mohd Faizal Zamri	(Malaysia) Muhamad Syafiq Hamzah	Figos	
Selangor	(Brazil) Edgar Eder Baldasso	(Malaysia) Khairul Effendy Mohd Bahrin	Joma	MBI
Terengganu	(Malaysia) Mohd Shafily Jusoh	(Malaysia) Syed Shahrul Niezam Syed Abd Rahim		
USM	(Malaysia) Mohd Yuzmuhaimizee Yaacob	(Malaysia) Airul Shaqim Asharun	Regles	
Wipers	(Malaysia) Mohd Ruzaley Abdul Aziz	(Malaysia) Fakhrul Hazim Mohd Zain	D'Mensi Legacy	

== Standings ==
=== League table ===
Pos	Team	Pld	W	D	L	GF	GA	GD	Pts	
1	Selangor (C)	16	16	0	0	126	24	+102	48	Qualified to Knock-out stage
2	Johor Darul Ta'zim	16	13	1	2	130	31	+99	40	Qualified to Knock-out stage
3	Pahang Rangers	16	12	1	3	98	35	+63	37	Advance to qualification play-off
4	KL City	16	7	2	7	46	62	−16	23	Advance to qualification play-off
5	Terengganu	16	6	2	8	59	70	−11	20	Advance to qualification play-off
6	ATM	16	5	3	8	42	67	−25	18	Advance to qualification play-off
7	USM	16	4	1	11	49	78	−29	13	
8	PFA Odin Sarawak	16	2	3	11	35	96	−61	9	
9	Wipers	16	0	1	15	14	136	−122	1	

Updated to match(es) played on 13 September 2026. Source: https://mpfl.my/table
Rules for classification: 1) Points; 2) Goal difference; 3) Number of goals scored.
(C) Champions

== Results ==
=== Results table ===
Home \ Away	ATM	JDT	KLC	PAH	PFA	SEL	TER	USM	WIP
ATM		3–8	2–3	1–6	5–1	0–5	2–1	5–4	6–0
Johor Darul Ta'zim	9–0		8–0	3–3	15–1	3–6	5–3	9–1	17–1
KL City	5–5	1–8		1–6	7–2	1–3	3–5	3–2	5–0
Pahang Rangers	6–1	4–5	6–4		5–2	3–5	6–4	7–1	19–2
PFA Odin Sarawak	1–1	1–10	2–2	0–7		1–9	3–9	3–4	5–1
Selangor	9–2	5–3	7–2	5–2	12–1		7–0	14–0	9–1
Terengganu	5–3	0–5	2–5	0–7	2–2	3–11		6–6	5–2
USM	3–5	2–5	4–5	0–2	4–2	2–6	4–5		8–0
Wipers	1–1	0–17	0–1	0–10	4–7	0–13	1–9	1–4	

Updated to match(es) played on 13 Sep 2026. Source: https://mpfl.my/
Legend: Blue = home team win; Yellow = draw; Red = away team win.

== Knock-out stage ==
=== Bracket ===
Play-off
3	Pahang Rangers	9
6	ATM	2
4	KL City	3
5	Terengganu	5

Semi-finals
2nd	Johor Darul Ta'zim	2	3	5
3rd	Pahang Rangers	4	4	8
1st	Selangor	6	6	12
5th	Terengganu	2	1	3

Final
Pahang Rangers	4	3	7
Selangor	3	7	10

=== Qualification play-off ===
Team 1	Score	Team 2
Pahang Rangers (3)	9–2	ATM (6)
KL City (4)	3–5	Terengganu (5)

==== Play-off 1 ====
19 September 2026
16:00 MST

KL City (4)	3–5	Terengganu (5)
Muhammad Syahid 27', 38'; Daniel Felipe 28', (yellow card) 28'; Dinesh Kumar (yellow card) 35'	Report	Alif Mat Amin 2', 17', 18', (yellow card) 23'; Muhammad Adib (yellow card) 28'; Syed Syahrul 36'; Haziq Shahiran (yellow card) 39'; Mohd. Hafizi 39'

Sukpa Indoor Stadium, Kuantan, Pahang

==== Play-off 2 ====
19 September 2026
20:30 MST

Pahang Rangers (3)	9–2	ATM (6)
Muhammad Haziq 6' (o.g.); Rodrigo da Silva 14'; Muhammad Sirhan 16'; Muhammad Syarifuddin 18', 26'; Muhammad Razin 20'; Felipe de Souza 24'; Akmarulnizam 29'; Muhammad Syazwan 31'	Report	Muhammad Imran (yellow card) 29', (goal) 37'; Shamsuri Saleh 40'

Sukpa Indoor Stadium, Kuantan, Pahang

== Semi-finals ==
The first legs were played on 26 September/3 October, and the second legs were played on 10/17 October 2026.

Team 1	Agg.	Team 2	1st leg	2nd leg
Johor Darul Ta'zim	5–8	Pahang Rangers	2–4	3–4
Selangor	12–3	Terengganu	6–2	6–1

=== Matches ===
26 September 2026
20:30 UTC+8

Pahang Rangers	4–2	Johor Darul Ta'zim
Felipe Souza 7', 30', 39'; Tuah Eizlan 36'	Report	26' Andresito; 39' Awalluddin

Sukpa Indoor Stadium, Kuantan
10 October 2026
18:00 UTC+8

Johor Darul Ta'zim	3–4	Pahang Rangers
Andresito 6'; Bruno Taffy 19'; Ridzwan Bakri 26'	Report	2', 48' Rodrigo Galvão; 25' Afiq Abdul Rahman; 49' Felipe Souza

Pasir Gudang City Council Indoor Stadium, Pasir Gudang

Pahang Rangers won 8–5 on aggregate.

3 October 2026
20:30 UTC+8

Terengganu	2–6	Selangor
Aidil Rosli 17' (o.g.); Iqhmal Najmie 35'	Report	2', 4', 5', 19' Marlon Araújo; 15' Nazreen; 35' Syahir Iqbal Khan

Sukpa Indoor Stadium, Kuantan
17 October 2026
20:30 UTC+8

Selangor	6–1	Terengganu
	Report

Panasonic Sports Complex, Shah Alam

== Final ==
The final will be played at the SUKPA Indoor Stadium, Kuantan & Selangor State Youth & Sports Complex, Shah Alam.

Team 1	Agg.	Team 2	1st leg	2nd leg
Pahang Rangers	7–10	Selangor	4–3	3–7

24 Oct 2026
20:30 MYT

Pahang Rangers	4–3	Selangor
Razin Rahim 11'; Rodrigo Galvão 24'; Syarifuddin 26'; Felipe 33'	Report	8', 39' Vandinho; 34' Marlon Araújo

SUKPA Indoor Stadium, Kuantan
31 Oct 2026
20:30 MYT

Selangor	7–3 (a.e.t.)	Pahang Rangers
Syahir Iqbal 8', 10', 50'; Khairul Effendy 9', 23'; Vandinho 14'; Marlon Araújo 47'	Report	17' Felipe Souza; 40' Sirhan Aiman; 48' Razin Rahim

Selangor State Youth & Sports Complex, Shah Alam

== Season statistics ==
=== Top goalscorers ===
As of 31 October 2026

Rank	Player	Team	Goals
1	(Brazil) Felipe Souza	Pahang Rangers	39
2	(Brazil) Marlon Araújo	Selangor	36
3	(Brazil) Rodrigo Galvao	Pahang Rangers	26
4	(Malaysia) Muhamad Alif Mat Amin	Terengganu	25
5	(Spain) Alcantara Prieto Andres	Johor Darul Ta'zim	23

=== Hat-tricks ===
As of 17 May 2026

Player	For	Against	Result	Date
(Brazil) Marlon Araújo ^{5}	Selangor	Wipers	0–13 (A)	16 May 2026
(Brazil) Bruno Taffy	Johor Darul Ta'zim	USM	9–1 (H)	16 May 2026
(Malaysia) Dinesh Kumar	KL City	Wipers	5–0 (H)	17 May 2026
(Brazil) Marlon Araújo (2)	Selangor	ATM	9–2 (H)	17 May 2026
(Malaysia) Alif Mat Amin ^{4}	Terengganu	USM	4–5 (A)	17 May 2026

Notes (H) – Home team (A) – Away team ^{4} – Player scored 4 goals ^{5} – Player scored 5 goals
