= 2024 Malaysia Futsal Cup =

Tournament details
- Dates: Play-off: 31 August; Competition proper: 7 September–30 September 2024
- Teams: Competition proper: 8 Total: 10

Final positions
- Champions: Johor Darul Ta'zim
- Runners-up: Selangor

Tournament statistics
- Top scorer(s): 7 goals Well Pereira (Selangor)
- (Note: All statistics do not include qualifying play-offs)

The 2024 Malaysia Futsal Cup was the 3rd season of the Malaysia Futsal Cup. 8 teams participate in this competition, 6 from the 2024 MPFL Division 1 and 2 from the 2024 MPFL Division 2.

Pahang Rangers were the defending champions, having beaten Johor Darul Ta'zim 3–1 on penalty shootout in the previous season's final.

== Schedule ==
The schedule of the competition was as follows.

Schedule for 2024 Malaysia Futsal Cup
Phase		Number of fixtures	Date
Qualifying
Play-offs		2	31 August 2024–1 September 2024
Competition proper
Quarter-finals	First leg	4	7,8–9 September 2024
Quarter-finals	Second leg	4	14,15–16 September 2024
Semi-finals	First leg	2	27–28 September 2024
Semi-finals	Second leg	2	2 September 2024
Final		1	30 September 2024

== Teams and draw ==
The draw was held on 2 September 2024.

2024 MPFL Division 1 (Division 1)
Rank	Team	Qualification
1	Johor Darul Ta'zim	Qualify
2	Selangor	Qualify
3	Pahang Rangers	Qualify
4	Shah Alam City	Qualify
5	Sabah	Qualify
6	Gombak TOT United	Qualify
7	Terengganu	Play-off
8	KL City	Play-off

2024 MPFL Division 2 (Division 2)
Rank	Team	Qualification
1	Kelantan	Play-off
2	Kedah	Play-off
3	Penang	Did not qualify
4	Malaysian University	Did not qualify
5	PFA Odin Sarawak F.C.	Did not qualify
6	Canaan F.C.	Did not qualify
7	ATM	Did not qualify
8	PJ Champz F.C.	Did not qualify
9	Nilai City S.C.	Did not qualify
10	Negeri Sembilan United F.C.	Did not qualify
11	Melaka	Did not qualify
12	Kuala Lumpur	Did not qualify

Teams enter the quarter-finals.
Teams enter the play-offs.
Teams did not qualify.

== Qualifying round ==
=== Play-off round ===
Team 1	Score	Team 2
Terengganu	2–3	Kedah
KL City	4–3	Kelantan

=== Matches ===
31 August 2024
12:00 UTC+8

Terengganu	2–3	Kedah
	Report

Ortuseight Arena, Kuala Lumpur

1 September 2024
12:00 UTC+8

KL City	4–3	Kelantan
	Report

Ortuseight Arena, Kuala Lumpur

== Bracket ==
Quarterfinals
KL City	6	2	8
Shah Alam City	2	5	7
Sabah	3	2	5
Johor Darul Ta'zim	5	6	11
Kedah	3	3	6
Pahang Rangers	3	6	9
Gombak TOT United	4	2	6
Selangor	5	7	12

Semifinals
KL City	0	2	2
Johor Darul Ta'zim	4	5	9
Pahang Rangers	3	4	7
Selangor	5	4	9

Finals
Johor Darul Ta'zim	3
Selangor	2
Third place
KL City	2
Pahang Rangers	4

== Quarter-finals ==
Team 1	Agg.	Team 2	1st leg	2nd leg
Gombak TOT United	6–12	Selangor	4–5	2–7
Sabah	5–11	Johor Darul Ta'zim	3–5	2–6
KL City	8–7	Shah Alam City	6–2	2–5
Kedah	6–9	Pahang Rangers	3–3	3–6

=== Matches ===
First leg

8 September 2024
21:00 UTC+8

KL City	6–2	Shah Alam City
	Report

Ortuseight Arena, Kuala Lumpur
Attendance: 160
Referee: Mohammad Nawawi Bin Abdul Rahman

Second leg

15 September 2024
17:30 UTC+8

Shah Alam City	5–2	KL City
	Report

KSN Panasonic, Shah Alam
Attendance: 150
Referee: Nasshafit Bin Zulkiflee

KL City won 8–7 on aggregate.

First leg

8 September 2024
16:00 UTC+8

Sabah	3–5	Johor Darul Ta'zim
	Report

Ortuseight Arena, Kuala Lumpur
Attendance: 180
Referee: Mohd Norafendy Bin Norhayalan

Second leg

14 September 2024
20:30 UTC+8

Johor Darul Ta'zim	6–2	Sabah
	Report

Pasir Gudang Close Stadium, Pasir Gudang
Attendance: 300
Referee: Ismeeth Ameer Bin Musa

Johor Darul Ta'zim won 11–5 on aggregate.

First leg

9 September 2024
20:30 UTC+8

Kedah	3–3	Pahang Rangers
	Report

Sultan Abdul Halim Stadium, Alor Setar
Attendance: 500
Referee: Muhammad Fazleem Rosli

Second leg

16 September 2024
17:00 UTC+8

Pahang Rangers	6–3	Kedah
	Report

SUKPA Stadium, Kuantan
Attendance: 1,000
Referee: Ahmad Farid Akmal Bin Shahrom

First leg

7 September 2024
21:00 UTC+8

Gombak TOT United	4–5	Selangor
	Report

Ortuseight Arena, Kuala Lumpur
Attendance: 200
Referee: Muhd Faiz Bin Jamaluddin

Second leg

15 September 2024
20:30 UTC+8

Selangor	7–2	Gombak TOT United
	Report

KSN Panasonic Stadium, Shah Alam
Attendance: 331
Referee: Hafsham Bin Ahmad Shokri

Selangor won 12–6 on aggregate.

== Semi-finals ==
Team 1	Agg.	Team 2	1st leg	2nd leg
KL City	2–9	Johor Darul Ta'zim	0–4	2–5
Pahang Rangers	7–9	Selangor	3–5	4–4

=== Matches ===
22 September 2024
10:00 UTC+8

KL City	0–4	Johor Darul Ta'zim
	Report

Ortuseight Arena, Kuala Lumpur
Attendance: 100
Referee: Mohd Amirul Aizat Mohd Lodin
28 September 2024
20:30 UTC+8

Johor Darul Ta'zim	5–2	KL City
	Report

Pasir Gudang City Council Indoor Stadium, Pasir Gudang
Attendance: 300
Referee: Mohammad Nawawi Bin Abdul Rahman

Johor Darul Ta'zim won 9–2 on aggregate.

22 September 2024
17:00 UTC+8

Pahang Rangers	3–5	Selangor
	Report

SUKPA Indoor Stadium, Kuantan
Attendance: 1,200
Referee: Ghafar Zabri
28 September 2024
20:30 UTC+8

Selangor	4–4	Pahang Rangers
	Report

Shah Alam National Sports Complex Panasonic, Shah Alam
Attendance: 648
Referee: Helday Idang

Selangor won 9–7 on aggregate.

== Third place play-off ==
=== Summary ===
Team 1	Score	Team 2
KL City	2–4	Pahang Rangers

=== Match ===
6 October 2024
14:00 UTC+8

KL City	2–4	Pahang Rangers
	Report

Axiata Arena, Bukit Jalil
Attendance: 250

== Final ==
=== Summary ===
Team 1	Score	Team 2
Johor Darul Ta'zim	3–2	Selangor

=== Match ===
6 October 2024
17:30 UTC+8

Johor Darul Ta'zim	3–2	Selangor
Bruno Taffy 4'; Firdaus Ambiah 27'; Azwann Ismail 33'	Report	Syahir Iqbal Khan 17'; Aidil Shahril Rosli 35'

Axiata Arena, Bukit Jalil
Attendance: 3,500
Referee: Muhd Faiz Bin Jamaluddin

== Statistics ==
Statistics exclude qualifying round.

=== Top goalscorers ===
Rank	Player	Team	Goals
1	(Brazil) Well Pereira	Selangor	7
2	(Malaysia) Mohd Awalludin Mat Nawi	Johor Darul Ta'zim	6

== See also ==
- 2024 MPFL Division 1
- 2024 MPFL Division 2
