= 2023 Malaysia Premier Futsal League =

Malaysia Premier Futsal League
- Season: 2023
- Dates: 18 February – 7 May (group stage); 8 July – 14 August (knockout stage)
- Champions: Pahang Rangers (1st title)
- Matches: 98
- Goals: 703 (7.17 per match)
- Top goalscorer: Ali Ebrahimi (22 goals)
- Biggest home win: Johor Darul Ta'zim; 12–1; Kuala Lumpur (29 April 2023)
- Biggest away win: Kuala Lumpur; 1–13; Selangor MAC (13 May 2023)
- All statistics correct as of 14 August 2023.

2023 Malaysia Premier Futsal League was the 3rd completed season of the Malaysia Premier Futsal League, and the 13th season of Malaysian futsal league overall.

Selangor MAC are the two-time defending champions, having won both the 2019 and 2022 season.

== Team changes ==
=== New teams ===
- Johor Darul Ta'zim
- PFA Odin Sarawak
- Sabah

=== Withdrawn teams ===
- Kelantan
- Negeri Sembilan
- Perak
- PDRM

== Teams ==
Fourteen teams are competing in the league – the eleven teams from the previous season and the three new teams. The three new teams are Johor Darul Ta'zim, Sabah and PFA Odin Sarawak.

=== Stadiums and locations ===
Team	Location	Stadium
ATM	Shah Alam	Panasonic Sport Complex
Johor Darul Ta'zim	Pasir Gudang	Pasir Gudang Indoor Stadium
Kedah	Alor Setar	Sultan Abdul Halim Stadium
KL City	Kuala Lumpur	ISN Raja Muda Sport Complex
KPT–PST Mustangs	Shah Alam	Panasonic Sport Complex
Kuala Lumpur	Shah Alam	Panasonic Sport Complex
Pahang Rangers	Kuantan	Sukpa Indoor Stadium
PFA Odin Sarawak	Kuching	Unity Stadium
Penang	Balik Pulau	Balik Pulau Sport Complex
Sabah	Kota Kinabalu	Sabah Foundation Futsal Court
Selangor MAC	Shah Alam	Panasonic Sport Complex
Selangor TOT United	Shah Alam	Panasonic Sport Complex
Shah Alam City	Shah Alam	Panasonic Sport Complex
Terengganu	Kuala Terengganu	Kuala Terengganu State Stadium

=== Personnel ===
Team	Head coach	Captain
ATM	(Malaysia) Izmir Firdaus Zainal Ariff	(Malaysia) Shamsuri Saleh
Johor Darul Ta'zim	(Spain) Juan Antonio Miguel Garcia	(Malaysia) Azrul Hadee Taufiq
Kedah	(Malaysia) Ahmad Rasidi Hashim	(Malaysia) Shahmi Abdullah Sani
KL City	(Malaysia) Mohd Rais Mohammad	(Malaysia) Muzhaffar Tahar
KPT–PST Mustangs	(Malaysia) Wan Suratman Adnan	(Malaysia) Alif Haiqal
Kuala Lumpur	(Malaysia) Arasan Joseph	(Malaysia) Fadzil Karnim
Pahang Rangers	(Spain) Gerard Casas Ullastre	(Malaysia) Akmarul Nizam
PFA Odin Sarawak	(Malaysia) Mohd Faizal Zamri	(Malaysia) Faezwan Ahmad
Pulau Pinang	(Malaysia) Hasnizal Hashim	(Malaysia) Syahman Idris
Sabah	(Malaysia) Sjaifudin Abdul Wahid	(Malaysia) Mohd Iftitah Ahmad
Selangor MAC	(Brazil) Edgar Eder Baldasso	(Malaysia) Muhammad Fariq
Selangor TOT United	(Thailand) Patt Sriwijit	(Malaysia) Yazid Kamaruzuan
Shah Alam City	(Malaysia) Fitri Yatim	(Malaysia) Aizat Borhanudin
Terengganu	(Malaysia) Mohd Rozairi Ahmad	(Malaysia) Tengku Azraf Fahimi

=== Foreign players ===
Team	Player 1	Player 2	Player 3
ATM			
Johor Darul Ta'zim	(Brazil) Caio Cesar	(Iran) Abdolrahman Sarani	(Thailand) Tanatul Thadavirot
Kedah			
KL City	(Indonesia) Anzar	(Brunei) Nasy'rul Wafiy Hassan	
KPT–PST Mustangs	(Indonesia) Kennet Erickson		
Kuala Lumpur			
Pahang Rangers	(Brazil) Matheus Gonzalez	(Iran) Amin Nasrollah Zadeh	(Brazil) Sérgio Jamur
PFA Odin Sarawak			
Pulau Pinang	(Iran) Saman Dashan	(Indonesia) Iqbal Pasaribu	
Sabah			
Selangor MAC	(Brazil) Matheus Silva	(Iran) Ali Ebrahimi	
Selangor TOT United	(Brazil) Helio Neto	(Thailand) Phukan Dongdang	
Shah Alam City	(Brazil) Well Pereira	(Thailand) Faris Thaiya	
Terengganu	(Indonesia) Andika Ricky Santoso		

== Format ==
The 2023 Malaysia Premier Futsal League season for the men's category will start on Saturday, 18 February 2023 with the participation of 14 teams divided into two groups according to zones. Group A consists of ATM, Kedah, KPT-PST Mustangs, Pahang Rangers, Penang, Sabah and Terengganu. While Group B features Johor Darul Ta'zim, KL City, Kuala Lumpur, PFA Odin Sarawak, Selangor MAC, Selangor TOT United and Shah Alam City. The competition is conducted in a two-round league format (home & away) at the team's chosen venue where each team will play 12 games. The top four teams of Group A and B will then advance to the knockout round which is the Quarter-Finals in one round (the venue of the match will be drawn) and the Semi-Finals and Finals reciprocally at the venue of the team's choice.

== Group stage ==
=== Table ===
==== Group A ====
Pos	Team	Pld	W	D	L	GF	GA	GD	Pts	Qualification
1	Pahang Rangers F.C.	12	11	1	0	70	18	+52	34	Qualification to the Knockout stage, AFF Futsal Club Championship&Malaysia Futsal Cup
2	Pulau Pinang	12	9	1	2	48	26	+22	28	Qualification to the Knockout stage & Malaysia Futsal Cup
3	Terengganu	12	8	1	3	54	38	+16	25	Qualification to the Knockout stage & Malaysia Futsal Cup
4	Sabah	12	4	0	8	40	52	−12	12	Advance to Knockout stage
5	ATM	12	3	1	8	27	64	−37	10	Relegation to 2024 MPFL Division 2
6	KPT–PST Mustangs	12	2	1	9	21	45	−24	7	Withdrawn Next Season & dissolved.
7	Kedah	12	1	3	8	31	48	−17	6	Relegation to 2024 MPFL Division 2

Updated to match(es) played on 25 June 2023. Source: https://cms.fam.org.my/v1/
Rules for classification: 1) Points; 2) Goal difference; 3) Number of goals scored.

==== Group B ====
Pos	Team	Pld	W	D	L	GF	GA	GD	Pts	Qualification
1	Johor Darul Ta'zim	12	10	1	1	70	21	+49	31	Qualification to the Knockout stage & Malaysia Futsal Cup
2	Selangor MAC	12	10	1	1	63	24	+39	31	Qualification to the Knockout stage & Malaysia Futsal Cup
3	Selangor TOT United	12	7	0	5	57	33	+24	21	Qualification to the Knockout stage & Malaysia Futsal Cup
4	Shah Alam City	12	6	0	6	43	43	0	18	Qualification to the Knockout stage & Malaysia Futsal Cup
5	KL City	12	5	1	6	35	42	−7	16	Qualification to the Malaysia Futsal Cup
6	PFA Odin Sarawak	12	1	2	9	28	67	−39	5	Relegation to 2024 MPFL Division 2
7	Kuala Lumpur	12	0	1	11	16	82	−66	1	Relegation to 2024 MPFL Division 2

Updated to match(es) played on 25 June 2023. Source: https://cms.fam.org.my/v1/
Rules for classification: 1) Points; 2) Goal difference; 3) Number of goals scored.

=== Results ===
==== Group A ====
Home \ Away	ATM	KED	MUS	PAH	PUL	TER	SAB
ATM	—	2–1	0–3	1–6	1–10	0–12	9–5
Kedah	3–3	—	4–2	2–5	3–4	5–6	2–4
KPT–PST Mustangs		3–3	—	1–7	1–2	3–7	2–1
Pahang Rangers	7–2	8–2	8–1	—	3–1	6–0	9–1
Pulau Pinang	4–2	5–2	4–1	2–2	—	4–2	4–2
Terengganu	4–3	1–1	3–0	2–5	5–2	—	6–4
Sabah	6–0	5–3	2–1	3–4	2–6	5–6	—

Updated to match(es) played on 25 June 2023. Source: https://cms.fam.org.my/v1/results
Legend: Blue = home team win; Yellow = draw; Red = away team win.

==== Group B ====
Home \ Away	JDT	KLC	KLU	POS	SEL	SAC	TOT
Johor Darul Ta'zim	—	2–0	12–1	8–3	1–1	4–1	5–4
KL City	2–4	—	3–0	5–0	0–5	5–4	4–3
Kuala Lumpur	2–10	2–4	—	3–6	1–13	1–5	2–10
PFA Odin Sarawak	1–11	2–2	2–2	—	5–6	3–4	2–7
Selangor MAC	1–4	6–3	7–0	5–1	—	4–2	3–1
Shah Alam City	2–8	8–5	6–1	4–1	2–6	—	4–2
Selangor TOT United	3–1	6–2	4–1	10–2	4–6	3–1	—

Updated to match(es) played on 25 June 2023. Source: https://cms.fam.org.my/v1/results
Legend: Blue = home team win; Yellow = draw; Red = away team win.

=== Results by round ===
==== Group A ====
Team ╲ Round	1	2	3	4	5	6	7	8	9	10	11	12
ATM	L	L	L	L	L	D	L	L	L	W	W	W
Kedah	D	L	L	D	L	D	L	L	L	W	L	L
KPT–PST Mustangs	L	L	L	D	W	L	L	W	L	L	L	L
Pahang Rangers	W	W	W	W	W	D	W	W	W	W	W	W
Pulau Pinang	W	W	W	L	D	W	W	W	W	L	W	W
Sabah	L	W	W	W	L	L	L	W	L	L	L	L
Terengganu	D	W	W	L	W	W	W	L	L	W	W	W

Updated to match(es) played on 25 June 2023. Source: https://cms.fam.org.my/v1/

==== Group B ====
Team ╲ Round	1	2	3	4	5	6	7	8	9	10	11	12
Johor Darul Ta'zim	W	L	W	W	W	W	W	W	D	W	W	W
KL City	L	W	L	W	W	L	L	L	D	W	L	W
Kuala Lumpur	L	L	L	L	L	L	L	D	L	L	L	L
PFA Odin Sarawak	L	W	L	L	L	L	D	D	L	L	L	L
Selangor MAC	W	W	W	L	W	W	W	W	D	W	W	W
Shah Alam City	W	L	W	L	W	W	L	L	L	W	W	L
Selangor TOT United	W	L	W	L	L	W	W	L	W	L	W	W

Updated to match(es) played on 25 June 2023. Source: https://cms.fam.org.my/v1/

== Knockout stage ==
=== Bracket ===
Quarterfinals
1A	Pahang Rangers	6	3	9
4B	Shah Alam City	1	1	2
3A	Terengganu	1	1	2
2B	Selangor MAC	4	5	9
2A	Pulau Pinang	1	1	2
3B	Selangor TOT United	2	2	4
4A	Sabah	0	0	0
1B	Johor Darul Ta'zim	12	9	21

Semifinals
Pahang Rangers	4	3	7
Selangor MAC	3	3	6
Selangor TOT United	5	3	8
Johor Darul Ta'zim	7	8	15

Finals
Pahang Rangers	7	2	9
Johor Darul Ta'zim	3	3	6

=== Quarter-finals ===
The first legs will be played on 8 July 2023 and the second legs will be played on 15 July 2023.

Team 1	Agg.	Team 2	1st leg	2nd leg
Pahang Rangers	9–2	Shah Alam City	6–1	3–1
Terengganu	2–9	Selangor MAC	1–4	1–5
Pulau Pinang	2–4	Selangor TOT United	1–2	1–2
Sabah	0–21	Johor Darul Ta'zim	0–12	0–9

=== Semi-finals ===
The first legs will be played on 22 July 2023 and the second legs will be played on 29 July 2023.

Team 1	Agg.	Team 2	1st leg	2nd leg
Pahang Rangers	7–6	Selangor MAC	4–3	3–3
Selangor TOT United	8–15	Johor Darul Ta'zim	5–7	3–8

=== Final ===
The first legs will be played on 5 August 2023 and the second legs will be played on 14 August 2023.

Team 1	Agg.	Team 2	1st leg	2nd leg
Pahang Rangers	9–6	Johor Darul Ta'zim	7–3	2–3

== Season statistics ==
=== Top scorers ===
Rank	Player	Club	Goals
1	(Iran) Ali Ebrahimi	Selangor MAC	22
2	(Malaysia) Ekmal Shahrin	Johor Darul Ta'zim	18
3	(Malaysia) Abu Haniffa Hasan	Johor Darul Ta'zim	16
3	(Malaysia) Awalluddin Mat Nawi	Johor Darul Ta'zim	16
3	(Brazil) Sérgio Jamur	Pahang Rangers	16
6	(Brazil) Well Pereira	Shah Alam City	15
7	(Malaysia) Azri Rahman	Johor Darul Ta'zim	14
7	(Malaysia) Harith Na'im Nasir	Pahang Rangers	14
9	(Malaysia) Aidil Shahril	Selangor MAC	13
9	(Malaysia) Yazid Kamaruzuan	Selangor TOT United	13

==== Hat-tricks ====
Player	For	Against	Result	Date
(Iran) Amin Nasrollah Zadeh	Pahang Rangers	Sabah	9–1 (H)	18 February 2023
(Malaysia) Mohd Ridzwan Bakri	Pahang Rangers	Sabah	9–1 (H)	18 February 2023
(Malaysia) Abu Haniffa Hasan	Johor Darul Ta'zim	Shah Alam City	8–2 (A)	26 February 2023
(Malaysia) Azri Rahman	Johor Darul Ta'zim	Shah Alam City	8–2 (A)	26 February 2023
(Malaysia) Fitrah Mohamad	Terengganu	ATM	12–0 (A)	26 February 2023
(Brazil) Matheus Vasconcelos Silva	Selangor MAC	KL City	6–3 (H)	4 March 2023
(Brazil) Well Pereira	Shah Alam City	Selangor TOT United	4–2 (H)	12 March 2023
(Brazil) Helio Neto	Selangor TOT United	PFA Odin Sarawak	10–2 (A)	7 May 2023
(Malaysia) Hazizi Mansor	Selangor TOT United	PFA Odin Sarawak	10–2 (A)	7 May 2023
(Iran) Ali Ebrahimi	Selangor MAC	Kuala Lumpur	13–1 (A)	13 May 2023
(Malaysia) Aidil Shahril	Selangor MAC	Kuala Lumpur	13–1 (A)	13 May 2023
(Malaysia) Yazid Kamaruzuan	Selangor TOT United	Johor Darul Ta'zim	4–5 (A)	20 May 2023
(Iran) Saman Dashan	Pulau Pinang	ATM	10–1 (A)	21 May 2023
(Malaysia) Awalluddin Mat Nawi	Johor Darul Ta'zim	Sabah	12–0 (A)	8 July 2023
(Malaysia) Ekmal Shahrin^{4}	Johor Darul Ta'zim	Sabah	12–0 (A)	8 July 2023
(Iran) Ali Ebrahimi	Selangor MAC	Terengganu	5–1 (H)	15 July 2023
(Malaysia) Azri Rahman	Johor Darul Ta'zim	Sabah	9–0 (H)	15 July 2023
(Malaysia) Yazid Kamaruzuan	Selangor TOT United	Johor Darul Ta'zim	5–7 (H)	24 July 2023
(Malaysia) Abu Haniffa Hasan	Johor Darul Ta'zim	Selangor TOT United	8–3 (H)	30 July 2023
(Malaysia) Harith Na'im Nasir^{4}	Pahang Rangers	Johor Darul Ta'zim	7–3 (H)	5 August 2023

^{4} Player scored four goals

== Awards ==
Award	Winner	Club
MPFL Most Valuable Player	(Malaysia) Harith Na'im Nasir	Pahang Rangers
MPFL Best Goalkeeper	(Malaysia) Zainulzahin Sinuan	Pahang Rangers
MPFL Top Scorer	(Iran) Ali Ebrahimi	Selangor MAC
