= Abu Hanifa (disambiguation) =

Abu Hanifa was the founder of the Hanafi school of Islamic jurisprudence.

Abu Hanifa or Abu Haniffa is also the name of:

- Abu Hanifa Dinawari, a 9th-century Kurdish polymath
- Abu Haniffa Hasan (born 1991), Malaysian futsal player
- al-Qadi al-Nu'man (Abū Ḥanīfa al-Nuʿmān ibn Muḥammad ibn Manṣūr ibn Aḥmad ibn Ḥayyūn al-Tamīmiyy), 10th-century jurist

== See also ==
- Abu Halifa, an area in Kuwait City
- Abu Hanifa Mosque, in Baghdad, Iraq
- Charikar, officially renamed to Imam Abu Hanifa, a town in Parwan Province, Afghanistan
