= Selangor F.C. Futsal =

Futsal club in Malaysia

Selangor Futsal
- Full name: Selangor Football Club Futsal
- Nicknames: Gergasi Merah (The Red Giants); King of Malaya
- Short name: SFC; SEL
- Founded: 2005; 21 years ago, as Selangor FA; 24 March 2019; 7 years ago, as Selangor MAC; 10 December 2023; 2 years ago, as Selangor F.C. Futsal
- Ground: Panasonic National Sport Complex; Shah Alam, Selangor
- Owner: Red Giants FC Sdn. Bhd.
- Chairman: Tengku Amir Shah
- Head coach: Edgar Eder Baldasso
- League: MPFL Division 1
- 2025: MPFL Division 1, 2nd of 8
- Website: selangorfc.com
Home colours	Away colours	Third colours

Selangor F.C. Futsal, formerly known as Selangor MAC, is a Malaysian professional futsal club based in the city of Shah Alam, Selangor. It is a futsal section of Selangor F.C. Nicknamed The Red Giants, they play home games at the Panasonic National Sport Complex. The club is owned by the Red Giants Sdn. Bhd, with Tengku Amir Shah as chairman.

The Red Giants hold the records for most MPFL Division 1 titles and most Malaysia Futsal Cup titles. Selangor was the third Malaysian club to enter the AFF Futsal Club Championship, finishing third in 2021 and 2022 seasons.

== History ==
After the state FA Futsal team hiatus from the competition, in 2019 Selangor MAC FC was officially established as a merger of MAC FC and Selangor United MPSJ FC. A total of 25 new players joined. On 10 December 2023, Selangor MAC changed the name to Selangor F.C.

== Kits ==
Period	Kit manufacturer	Front sponsors	Back sponsors	Shoulder sponsors
2019	Joma	Fancy Futsal	Vizione	Lynas
2020	Joma	PKNS, Fancy Futsal, Vizione	—	ANF Logistic
2021	Joma	PKNS, Fancy Futsal, Vizione	—	Lynas
2022	Joma	Fancy Futsal, Wing Hin Group of Companies, Lynas	D'Aurora	Lynas
2023	Joma	MSU Medical Centre, Wing Hin Group of Companies	—	Fancy Futsal
2024	Joma	Menteri Besar Selangor Incorporated, SELMAC Sports, Futuro, Protein, GenesisW	Lynas, Yoodo	—
2025	Joma	Menteri Besar Selangor Incorporated and Air Selangor	—	—

== Stadium ==
Period	Venue	Location
2019–	Panasonic National Sports Complex	Shah Alam, Selangor

== Players ==
=== First team squad ===
As of 9 November 2025

No.	Position	Player	Nationality
1	Goalkeeper	Affiq	Malaysia
18	Goalkeeper	Syaifuddin Syukri	Malaysia
21	Goalkeeper	Syawal Sabaruddin	Malaysia
6	Winger	Syahir Iqbal Khan	Malaysia
7	Winger	Faris Johan	Malaysia
8	Winger	Haiqal Hasnor	Malaysia
10	Winger	Farhan Anuar	Malaysia
11	Winger	Haziq Haikal	Malaysia
12	Winger	Nazreen Saudi	Malaysia
14	Winger	Aidil Shahril	Malaysia
22	Winger	Evandro Borges	Brazil
25	Winger	Aidil Afiqzam	Malaysia
5	Forward	Khaiyum Khaimi	Malaysia
9	Forward	Khairul Effendy	Malaysia
13	Forward	Saiful Nizam	Malaysia
15	Forward	Firdaus Masdzir	Malaysia
24	n/a	Fitri Haqim	Malaysia

=== Club captains ===
Period	Player	Nationality
2019–2024	Fariq Mohammad	Malaysia
2025–	Khairul Effendy	Malaysia

== Management ==
=== Coaching staff ===
Position	Staff
Team Manager	(Malaysia) Mimi Afzan Azfa
Head Coach	(Brazil) Edgar Eder Baldasso
Assistant head coach	(Malaysia) Eoh Shao Yao
Goalkeeper Coach	(Malaysia) Mohd Firdaus Razali
Fitness Coach	(Brazil) Liborio Carvalho
Fitness Coach	(Malaysia) Luqman Mat Nur Abdul Razak
Fitness Coach	(Malaysia) Ahmad Khairi Aswad Ishak
Physiotherapist	(Malaysia) Mohammad Nor Ashraff Amran

=== Head coach records ===
==== Record ====
Information correct as of 24 October 2026, last match againts Pahang Rangers. Only competitive matches are counted.

Name	Nationality	From	To	Pld	W	D	L	GF	GA	Win%	Ref
Addy Shairullyzam	Malaysia	17 February 2019	8 August 2022	41	33	4	4	165	82	80.49	
Beto Aranha	Brazil	8 August 2022	12 November 2022	4	1	1	2	11	10	25.00	
Edgar Eder Baldasso	Brazil	20 November 2022	Present	78	63	3	12	459	169	80.77	

==== Honours ====
Name	Nationality	From	To	Honours
Addy Shairullyzam	Malaysia	17 February 2019	8 August 2022	2 – Malaysia Premier Futsal League (2019, 2022); 1 – Malaysia Futsal Cup (2022)
Beto Aranha	Brazil	8 August 2022	12 November 2022	none
Edgar Eder Baldasso	Brazil	20 November 2022	present	1 – Malaysia Futsal Cup (2025) 1 – Malaysia Premier Futsal League (2026)

== Records ==
=== List of seasons ===
This is a partial list of the last seven seasons completed by the Red Giants. For the full season-by-season history, see List of Selangor F.C. Futsal seasons.

Selangor F.C. Futsal last seven seasons
Season	League	Pld	W	D	L	GF	GA	GD	Pts	Pos	MFC	AFF	Top goalscorers	Goals (Note: Only competitive matches are counted.)
2019	MPFL	16	13	2	1	62	25	+37	41	1st	—	—	(Malaysia) Fariq Mohammad	18
2020	MPFL	1	1	0	0	3	2	+1	3	— (Note: The 2020 MPFL season was abandoned after only one game played due to the COVID-19 pandemic.)	—	—	(Malaysia) Syed Aizad Daniel	3
2021	MPFL	0	0	0	0	0	0	0	0	— (Note: The 2021 MPFL season was cancelled due to the COVID-19 pandemic.)	—	3rd	(Malaysia) Ekmal Shahrin	3
2022	MPFL	14	12	1	1	66	32	+34	37	1st	W	3rd	(Brazil) Silva Matheus	22
2023	MPFL	16	12	2	2	78	33	+45	38	SF (Note: The 2023 MPFL season use the group and knockout stage format. There is no third place match.)	3rd	—	(Iran) Ali Ebrahimi	22
2024	Division 1	14	11	0	3	65	35	+30	33	2nd	RU	—	(Brazil) Well Pereira	22
2025	Division 1	14	12	0	2	94	29	+65	36	2nd	W	—	(Brazil) Vitor Fernandes	42

=== Continental record ===
The debut of Selangor in continental competitions took place in the 2021 season as a participant in that season's AFF Futsal Cup. Selangor's best position in the competition was 3rd place, achieved in both the 2021 and 2022 seasons.

==== Summary ====
Competition	Pld	W	D	L	GF	GA	GD	Win%
AFF Futsal Club Championship (Note: Previously known as AFF Futsal Cup.)	8	4	0	4	23	20	+3	50.00

==== Results ====
All results list Selangor's goal tally first.

Season	Competition	Round	Club	Result	Position
2021	AFF Futsal Cup	Round-robin	(Thailand) Chonburi Bluewave	0–3	3rd out of 4
2021	AFF Futsal Cup	Round-robin	(Malaysia) Pahang Rangers	5–1	3rd out of 4
2021	AFF Futsal Cup	Round-robin	(Thailand) Port	0–4	3rd out of 4
2021	AFF Futsal Cup	Round-robin	(Cambodia) Mohahang All Star	7–2	3rd out of 4
2022	AFF Futsal Cup	Group B	(Timor-Leste) Ramelau	6–0	2nd out of 3
2022	AFF Futsal Cup	Group B	(Vietnam) Sahako	1–2	2nd out of 3
2022	AFF Futsal Cup	Semi-final	(Thailand) Hongyen Thakam	2–6	3rd place
2022	AFF Futsal Cup	Third place	(Vietnam) Sahako	2–2 (a.e.t.) (8–7p)	3rd place

== Honours ==
=== Club ===
In 2019, Selangor won their first MPFL title and became the league's inaugural champions. In 2022, Selangor successfully defended their MPFL title. In the same season, Selangor became the inaugural winner of the Malaysia Futsal Cup and thus the first club to achieve the double.

Continental
Competitions	Titles	Seasons
AFC Futsal Club Championship	0	
AFF Futsal Club Championship (Note: Previously known as the AFF Futsal Cup)	0	
Domestic
Competitions	Titles	Seasons
MPFL Division 1 (Note: Previously known as the Liga Futsal Kebangsaan and the Malaysia Premier Futsal League)	3	2019, 2022, 2026
Malaysia Futsal Cup	2	2022, 2025

- record

=== Players ===
Season	Player	Nationality
MPFL Division 1 top scorer
2019	Fariq Mohammad	Malaysia
2022	Ekmal Shahrin	Malaysia
2022	Silva Matheus Vasconcelos	Brazil
2023	Ali Ebrahimi	Iran
2025	Vitor Fernandes	Brazil

Season	Player	Nationality
Malaysia Futsal Cup top scorer
2024	Well Pereira	Brazil
2025	Vitor Fernandes	Brazil

Season	Player	Nationality
Malaysia Futsal Cup MVP
2022	Khairul Effendy	Malaysia
2025	Syahir Iqbal Khan	Malaysia

Season	Player	Nationality
Malaysia Futsal Cup best goalkeeper
2025	Syaifuddin Syukri	Malaysia
