= 2025 MPFL Division 1 =

5th season of the Malaysia Premier Futsal League

MPFL Division 1
- Season: 2025
- Dates: 8 March – 12 July
- Champions: Johor Darul Ta'zim
- Promoted: Johor Darul Ta'zim
- Matches: 24
- Goals: 166 (6.92 per match)
- Top goalscorer: Vitor Fernando (13 goals)
- Biggest home win: Selangor 11–3 KL City
- Biggest away win: TOT United 0–7 Selangor
- Highest scoring: Selangor 11–3 KL City
- Longest winning run: 6 matches Johor Darul Ta'zim
- Longest unbeaten run: 6 matches Johor Darul Ta'zim
- Longest winless run: 5 matches TOT United
- Longest losing run: 5 matches TOT United

The 2025 season was the 6th season of the Malaysia Premier Futsal League (MPFL) and the 16th season of the Malaysian futsal league overall. The MPFL Division 1 is contested by 8 teams. The season began on 8 March, and concluded on 12 July. Johor Darul Ta'zim were the defending champions.

== Team changes ==
The following teams have changed division since the 2024 season.

=== To the MPFL Division 1 ===
Promoted from the MPFL Division 2

- Kedah
- Malaysian University

=== From the MPFL Division 1 ===
Relegated to the MPFL Division 2

- Terengganu

Withdrawn

- Shah Alam City

=== Name changes ===
- Gombak TOT United removed "Gombak" from its official name and change their full name to TOT United.

== Teams ==
=== Stadiums and locations ===
Team	Location	Stadium
Johor Darul Ta'zim	Johor Bahru	Pasir Gudang Indoor Stadium
Kedah	Alor Setar	Sultan Abdul Halim Indoor Stadium
KL City	Kuala Lumpur	ISN Raja Muda Sports Complex
Malaysian University	Shah Alam	Panasonic Sport Complex Selangor Youth & Sports Complex
Pahang Rangers	Kuantan	Sukpa Indoor Stadium
Sabah	Kota Kinabalu	Dewan Sri Putatan
Selangor	Shah Alam	Panasonic Sport Complex
TOT United	Kuala Lumpur	Ortuseight Arena ISN Raja Muda Sports Complex

=== Personnel, kit and sponsoring ===
Team	Head coach	Captain	Kit manufacturer	Sponsor
Johor Darul Ta'zim	(Spain) Juan Antonio Miguel Garcia	(Malaysia) Azrul Hadee Mohd Taufiq	Nike	JDT Fan Token
Kedah	(Malaysia) Muhammad Aidiel Boon	(Thailand) Nattawat Luksanato	Athelead	Experience Kedah
KL City	(Malaysia) Jerry Dinesh Pireira	(Malaysia) Dinesh Kumar Kumaran Raja	Hundred	Bodyhack / Data Sukan
Malaysian University	(Malaysia) Addy Shairyllyzam Shafiee	(Malaysia) Muhammad Arif Roslan	Let's Play Performance	Hyba Quest
Pahang Rangers	(Spain) Luis Fonseca Cilleros	(Malaysia) Akmarulnizam Idris	Ortuseight	N/A
Sabah	(Spain) Nacho Garrido Gallego	(Malaysia) Mohd Syarul Nizam Ag Hassan	Maxumax	Jetama
Selangor	(Brazil) Edgar Eder Baldasso	(Malaysia) Khairul Effendy Bahrin	Joma	MBI / Air Selangor
TOT United	(Malaysia) Fitri Muhamad Yatim	(Malaysia) Helmi Imran Mohd Nor	Kovra	MBI

== Standings ==
=== League table ===
Pos	Team	Pld	W	D	L	GF	GA	GD	Pts	
1	Johor Darul Ta'zim (C)	14	13	0	1	93	36	+57	39	Qualification to the AFF Futsal Club Championship
2	Selangor	14	12	0	2	94	29	+65	36	
3	Pahang Rangers	14	9	0	5	80	56	+24	27	
4	Sabah	14	6	2	6	43	49	−6	20	Withdrawn from MPFL
5	KL City	14	4	2	8	41	65	−24	14	
6	TOT United	14	3	1	10	38	69	−31	10	Withdrawn from MPFL
7	Malaysian University	14	2	3	9	35	77	−42	9	Withdrawn from MPFL
8	Kedah	14	2	2	10	32	75	−43	8	Withdrawn from MPFL

Updated to match(es) played on 13 July 2025. Source: FAM-CMS
Rules for classification: 1) Points; 2) Goal difference; 3) Number of goals scored.
(C) Champions

=== Positions by round ===
Team ╲ Round	1	2	3	4	5	6	7	8	9	10	11	12	13	14
Johor Darul Ta'zim	1	1	1	1	1	1	1	1	1	1	1	1	1	1
Selangor	2	4	2	2	2	3	3	3	3	2	2	2	2	2
Pahang Rangers	4	2	4	3	3	2	2	2	2	3	3	3	3	3
Sabah	3	5	5	5	6	6	5	4	4	4	4	4	4	4
KL City	5	3	3	4	4	4	4	5	5	5	5	5	5	5
TOT United	6	7	8	8	8	8	8	8	8	8	8	7	6	6
Malaysian University	8	8	7	7	5	5	6	6	6	6	7	8	8	7
Kedah	7	6	6	6	7	7	7	7	7	7	6	6	7	8

League leader

Source: FAM-CMS

== Results ==
=== Results table ===
Home \ Away	JDT	KED	KLC	MAS	PAH	SAB	SEL	TOT
Johor Darul Ta'zim		11–2	6–1	8–3	4–3	4–1	5–8	7–3
Kedah	1–5		1–1	2–2	1–8	3–1	3–9	5–9
KL City	2–11	5–1		3–2	2–6	2–3	2–7	4–2
Malaysian University	2–12	3–5	1–6		5–4	4–4	2–8	2–1
Pahang Rangers	6–7	8–3	4–3	6–2		6–5	6–5	7–2
Sabah	1–4	5–2	6–3	2–2	9–5		0–5	3–2
Selangor	0–3	5–1	11–3	9–0	7–2	7–1		6–1
TOT United	3–6	3–2	4–4	7–5	1–9	0–2	0–7	

Updated to match(es) played on 13 July 2025. Source: https://cms.fam.org.my/v1/results
Legend: Blue = home team win; Yellow = draw; Red = away team win.

=== Results by match played ===
Team ╲ Round	1	2	3	4	5	6	7	8	9	10	11	12	13	14
Johor Darul Ta'zim	W	W	W	W	W	W	W	W	W	W	W	W	W	L
Kedah	L	W	L	D	L	L	L	L	L	D	W	L	L	L
KL City	L	W	W	L	L	W	L	L	L	D	L	L	W	D
Malaysian University	L	L	D	D	W	L	L	L	L	D	L	L	L	W
Pahang Rangers	W	W	L	W	W	W	W	W	W	L	L	W	L	L
Sabah	W	L	D	L	L	L	W	W	W	D	W	L	L	W
Selangor	W	L	W	W	W	L	W	W	W	W	W	W	W	W
TOT United	L	L	L	L	L	W	L	L	L	L	L	W	W	D

Updated to match(es) played on 13 July 2025. Source: https://cms.fam.org.my/v1/results

== Season statistics ==
=== Top goalscorers ===
As of 13 July 2025

Rank	Player	Team	Goals
1	(Brazil) Vitor Fernando	Selangor	29
2	(Brazil) Felipe Souza	Pahang Rangers	22
3	(Malaysia) Mohd Awalludin Mat Nawi	Johor Darul Ta'zim	21
3	(Brazil) Bruno Taffy	Johor Darul Ta'zim	21
5	(Brazil) Evandro Borges	Selangor	19
6	(Brazil) Daniel Felipe	KL City	18

=== Hat-tricks ===
As of 14 June 2025

Player	For	Against	Result	Date
(Brazil) Garcia Rego Caio Cesar	Johor Darul Ta'zim	Malaysian University	8–3 (H)	8 March 2025
(Brazil) Matheus Moura Batista	Pahang Rangers	Malaysian University	6–2 (H)	15 March 2025
(Brazil) Daniel Felipe de Almeida	KL City	Kedah	5–1 (H)	22 March 2025
(Brazil) Vitor Fernando dos Santos	Selangor	TOT United	0–7 (A)	23 March 2025
(Brazil) Evandro Borges ^{4}	Selangor	KL City	11–3 (H)	19 April 2025
(Brazil) Vitor Fernando dos Santos (2)	Selangor	KL City	11–3 (H)	19 April 2025
(Brazil) Vitor Manoel da Silva	Sabah	Pahang Rangers	6–5 (A)	19 April 2025
(Malaysia) Syed Aizad Daniel Syed Nasir	Johor Darul Ta'zim	KL City	6–1 (H)	26 April 2025
(Brazil) Felipe Souza	Pahang Rangers	Kedah	1–8 (A)	26 April 2025
(Brazil) Vitor Fernando dos Santos ^{4} (3)	Selangor	Pahang Rangers	6–5 (A)	3 May 2025
(Malaysia) Awalluddin Mat Nawi	Johor Darul Ta'zim	Kedah	11–2 (H)	10 May 2025
(Brazil) Bruno Taffy ^{5}	Johor Darul Ta'zim	Kedah	11–2 (H)	10 May 2025
(Brazil) Matheus Moura Batista ^{4} (2)	Pahang Rangers	TOT United	7–2 (H)	10 May 2025
(Brazil) Evandro Borges (2)	Selangor	Kedah	3–9 (A)	22 May 2025
(Brazil) Bruno Taffy ^{4} (2)	Johor Darul Ta'zim	Malaysian University	2–12 (A)	24 May 2025
(Malaysia) Awalluddin Mat Nawi (2)	Johor Darul Ta'zim	Kedah	1–5 (A)	31 May 2025
(Malaysia) Ahmad Harith Na'im	Pahang Rangers	TOT United	1–9 (A)	2 June 2025
(Brazil) Vitor Fernando dos Santos ^{4} (4)	Selangor	Malaysian University	9–0 (H)	2 June 2025
(Malaysia) Khairul Effendy Bahrin	Selangor	Malaysian University	9–0 (H)	2 June 2025
(Brazil) Vitor Manoel da Silva (2)	Sabah	KL City	6–3 (H)	9 June 2025
(Malaysia) Mohd Ridzwan Bakri ^{4}	Johor Darul Ta'zim	Pahang Rangers	6–7 (A)	14 June 2025
(Brazil) Vitor Fernando dos Santos (4)	Selangor	TOT United	6–1 (H)	14 June 2025

Notes (H) – Home team (A) – Away team ^{4} – Player scored 4 goals ^{5} – Player scored 5 goals

== See also ==
- 2025 MPFL Division 2
