= Kuala Lumpur City F.C. Futsal Club =

KL City
- Full name: Kuala Lumpur City FC Futsal Club
- Short name: KL City Futsal
- Founded: 2009; 17 years ago
- Ground: Various
- Head coach: Jerry Dinesh Pireira
- League: MPFL Division 1
- 2025: MPFL Division 1, 5th of 8

Kuala Lumpur City F.C. Futsal Club (commonly known as KL City FC Futsal) is a Malaysian professional futsal club based in the federal territory of Kuala Lumpur. The club competes in the Malaysia Premier Futsal League (MPFL), the top tier of professional futsal in Malaysia.

== History ==
Founded in 2009, The club was established to represent the Federal Territory of Kuala Lumpur in the newly restructured national futsal pyramid managed by the Football Association of Malaysia (FAM). Following the commercial growth of the Malaysia Premier Futsal League, established football entities like Kuala Lumpur City F.C. integrated indoor futsal wings into their sports portfolios to capture the growing domestic interest in the sport.

The team achieved promotion to / maintained its status in the highly competitive MPFL Division 1, facing traditional powerhouse rivals such as Johor Darul Ta'zim, Selangor, and Pahang Rangers.

== Stadium ==
KL City FC Futsal hosts its home matches at regional indoor arenas within the Klang Valley, primarily utilizing the Kompleks Sukan Negara (ISN) Raja Muda or the Kampung Pandan Sports Complex, which adhere to the international dimensions required by the MPFL.

== Crest and Colours ==
The team shares its visual identity, crest, and traditional primary colours of red and white with its parent football club, symbolizing the municipal colors of Kuala Lumpur.

== League and cup record ==
League												Playoffs	Malaysia Futsal Cup	AFF Futsal Club	AFC Futsal Club
Season	Div.	Teams	Pos.	Pld	W	D	L	GF	GA	GD	Pts	Playoffs	Malaysia Futsal Cup	AFF Futsal Club	AFC Futsal Club
2019	MPFL	9	9th	12	0	3	9	28	52	−24	3	-	not held	not held	not held
2020	MPFL	12	8th	1	0	0	1	2	3	−1	0	-	not held	not held	not held
2022	MPFL	15	12th	14	5	3	6	37	40	−3	18	-	DNQ	not held	not held
2023	MPFL Group B	7	5th	5	1	6	1	35	42	−7	16	-	Quarterfinals	not held	not held
2024	MPFL Division 1	8	8th	14	0	0	14	30	81	−51	0	-	Semifinals	not held	not held
2025	MPFL Division 1	8	5th	14	4	2	8	41	65	−24	14	-	Quarterfinals	not held	not held

== Players ==
=== First team squad ===
Information correct as of 16 May 2026.

No.	Position	Player	Nationality
1	Goalkeeper	Muhammad Arif Alias	Malaysia
18	Goalkeeper	Alif Muhammad Faizal	Malaysia
21	Goalkeeper	Syafiq Sabaruddin	Malaysia
2	Defender	Nazri Yunus	Malaysia
11	Defender	Ahmad Zulfathi Zubir	Malaysia
22	Defender	Matias Danisan	Malaysia
24	Defender	Iman Firdaus	Malaysia
5	Midfielder	Navin Das	Malaysia
6	Midfielder	Adham Yusri	Malaysia
7	Midfielder	Dinesh Kumar	Malaysia
10	Midfielder	Daniel Felipe de Almeida	Brazil
12	Midfielder	Lucas Araujo Magalhaes	Brazil
14	Midfielder	Suhairy Jefri	Malaysia
17	Midfielder	Dodie Al Fareq	Malaysia
23	Midfielder	Rayyan Hakimi	Malaysia
4	Forward	Megat Adam	Malaysia
9	Forward	Sufri Shamil	Malaysia
13	Forward	Syahid Ajid	Malaysia
16	Forward	Nurhan Danish	Malaysia
20	Forward	Hafiz Jaafar	Malaysia

== Club officials ==
As of May 2026

Position	Name
Team manager	(Malaysia) Muhammad Hamzah
Head coach	(Malaysia) Jerry Dinesh Pireira
Assistant coach	(Malaysia) Mohammad Taufik Yaiyah
Goalkeeper coach	(Malaysia) Muhammad Shazwan Abdul Razak
Physiotherapist	(Malaysia) Farhanna Faziera binti Johari
Team Official	(Malaysia) Ainan Ikhmal Syaffiq
Team Coordinator	(Malaysia) Mohd Fizree Zakaria

== See also ==
- Kuala Lumpur City F.C.
- MPFL Division 1
