= Malaysia Futsal Cup =

Malaysian men's futsal competition

- Organiser(s): FAM
- Founded: 2022; 4 years ago
- Region: Malaysia
- Teams: 8
- Qualifier for: AFF Futsal Club Championship
- Related competitions: MPFL Division 1 & MPFL Division 2
- Current champions: Selangor (2nd title)
- Most championships: Selangor (2 titles)
- Broadcaster: Astro Arena
- Website: Official website
- 2025 Malaysia Futsal Cup

The Malaysia Futsal Cup (abbreviated as the MFC) is an annual futsal club competition in Malaysia organised by the Football Association of Malaysia (FAM). Teams qualify for the competition based on their performance in the Malaysia Premier Futsal League (MPFL).

6 teams from MPFL Division 1 and 2 teams from MPFL Division 2 qualify directly. The winners of the competition are awarded with a slot to compete in the AFF Futsal Club Championship. Selangor MAC were the inaugural winners of the competition, having beaten Pahang Rangers 4–3 in the 2022 final.

Selangor are the current champions, having beaten Pahang Rangers 13–3 in the 2025 final for their second title.

== History ==
The first Malaysia Futsal Cup featured Negeri Sembilan, Pahang Rangers, PDRM, Pulau Pinang, Selangor MAC, Selangor TOT United, Shah Alam City and Terengganu. The inaugural match of the Malaysia Futsal Cup was held on 11 June 2022 and saw Selangor MAC secure a victory over Shah Alam City with a score of 2–1 at the Panasonic Sport Complex in Shah Alam. The historic first goal was scored by Silva Matheus Vasconcelos of Selangor MAC.

The tournament culminated with the inaugural final on 23 July. The final featured Selangor MAC and Pahang Rangers. In a dramatic showdown, Selangor MAC emerged victorious with a 4–3 score, securing their place in the annals of the Malaysian futsal history. Ridzwan Bakri of Pahang Rangers and Amirul Radzi of Pulau Pinang shared the honour of being the inaugural top scorers, each netting six goals.

The 2025 edition saw Selangor become the first team to win the competition twice after delivering a record-breaking 13–3 victory over the Pahang Rangers in the final. Brazilian player Vitor Fernandes was instrumental in this historic win, scoring eight of the team's goals.

== Competition format ==
=== Qualification ===
Starting in 2025, the top six teams from MPFL Division 1 will automatically qualify for the main round of the competition, securing their places based on their performance throughout the season. Unlike the previous format, the two bottom teams from Division 1 will no longer qualify. Instead, the champion and runner-up of MPFL Division 2 will take the final two spots.

=== Knockout stage ===
The format of the Malaysia Futsal Cup is structured around the knockout stage that begins with the quarterfinals. Each round is played over two legs, with home and away matches ensuring opportunity for both teams to perform on their home ground. For the third-place playoff and the final, matches are taking place at a neutral venue.

== Sponsorship ==
Period	Sponsor	Name
2022	Cuckoo Electronics	CUCKOO Malaysia Futsal Cup
2023–		Malaysia Futsal Cup

== Results ==
Ed.	Year	Final			Third place play-off			Venue	Ref.
Ed.	Year	Winners	Score	Runners-up	Third	Score	Fourth	Venue	Ref.
1	2022	Selangor MAC	4–3	Pahang Rangers	Selangor TOT United	3–2	Pulau Pinang	Panasonic Sport Complex, Shah Alam	
2	2023	Pahang Rangers	4–4 (3–1p)	Johor Darul Ta'zim	Selangor MAC	7–2	Terengganu	Malawati Stadium, Shah Alam	
3	2024	Johor Darul Ta'zim	3–2	Selangor	Pahang Rangers	4–2	KL City	Axiata Arena, Kuala Lumpur	
4	2025	Selangor	13–3	Pahang Rangers	Johor Darul Ta'zim	4–3	Sabah	N9 Arena, Nilai	

== Performances by teams ==
Performances in the Malaysia Futsal Cup by teams
Team	Title(s)	Runners-up	Years won	Years runner-up
Selangor (Note: Formerly known as Selangor MAC.)	2	1	2022, 2025	2024
Pahang Rangers (Note: Formerly known as Kuantan Rangers.)	1	2	2023	2022, 2025
Johor Darul Ta'zim	1	1	2024	2023

== Performances by states ==
Performances in the Malaysia Futsal Cup by state
State	Titles	Runners-up	Teams	Total
Selangor	2	1	Selangor (2/1)	3
Pahang	1	2	Pahang Rangers (1/2)	3
Johor	1	1	Johor Darul Ta'zim (1/1)	2

== Top scorers by season ==
Season	Players	Team	Goals	Ref.
2022	(Malaysia) Ridzwan Bakri	Pahang Rangers	6	
2022	(Malaysia) Amirul Radzi	Pulau Pinang	6	
2023	(Iran) Amin Nasrollah	Pahang Rangers	5	
2023	(Malaysia) Ridzwan Bakri	Pahang Rangers	5	
2024	(Brazil) Well Pereira	Selangor	7	
2025	(Brazil) Vitor Fernandes	Selangor	13	

== Awards ==
=== Prize money ===
- Champion: RM 25,000
- Runner-up: RM 15,000
- Third-place: RM 10,000

=== Most Valuable Player ===
Starting from 2022, the FAM introduced the Malaysia Futsal Cup Most Valuable Player award.

Year	Player	Team
2022	(Malaysia) Khairul Effendy	Selangor MAC
2023	(Malaysia) Ridzwan Bakri	Pahang Rangers
2024	(Malaysia) Awalluddin Mat Nawi	Johor Darul Ta'zim
2025	(Malaysia) Syahir Iqbal Khan	Selangor

=== Best goalkeeper ===
In the 2023 season, the FAM introduced the Malaysia Futsal Cup best goalkeeper award.

Year	Player	Team
2023	(Malaysia) Zainulzahin Sinuan	Pahang Rangers
2024	(Malaysia) Azrul Hadee	Johor Darul Ta'zim
2025	(Malaysia) Syaifuddin Syukri	Selangor

== See also ==
- Football in Malaysia
- Malaysia national futsal team
