= 2020 Malaysia Premier Futsal League =

Malaysia Premier Futsal League
- Season: 2020
- Champions: None; cancelled and declared null and void
- Matches played: 6
- Goals scored: 50 (8.33 per match)
- All statistics correct as of 15 March 2020.

The abandoned 2020 Malaysia Premier Futsal League would have been the 2nd season of the Malaysia Premier Futsal League. It is the Malaysian professional futsal league for association football clubs, since its establishment in 2004. Selangor are the defending champions.

== Team changes ==
=== New teams ===
- Sarawak
- Kelantan
- Negeri Sembilan
- KPM-PST Mustangs

=== Withdrawn teams ===
- Melaka United

== Teams ==
For 2020 season, a total of 12 clubs compete in league.

Clubs	Location	Venue
Selangor MAC	Shah Alam	Panasonic Sport Complex
Pahang Rangers	Kuantan	SUKPA Indoor Stadium
Terengganu	Kuala Terengganu	Kuala Terengganu State Stadium
Perak	Ipoh	Indera Mulia Stadium
Kuala Lumpur	Shah Alam	Panasonic Sport Complex
Kedah	Alor Setar	Sultan Abdul Halim Stadium
Penang	Gelugor	Azman Hashim USM Sport Arena
KL City	TBD	TBD
Sarawak	TBD	TBD
Kelantan	Kuala Terengganu	Kuala Terengganu State Stadium
Negeri Sembilan	Shah Alam	Panasonic Sport Complex
KPM-PST Mustangs	Kuantan	IIUM Indoor Arena

== League table ==
Pos	Team	Pld	W	D	L	GF	GA	GD	Pts	Qualification or relegation
1	Pahang Rangers	1	1	0	0	9	1	+8	3	Qualification for AFF Futsal Club Championship
2	Terengganu	1	1	0	0	10	3	+7	3	
3	Kelantan	1	1	0	0	4	1	+3	3	
4	Kuala Lumpur	1	1	0	0	6	4	+2	3	
5	Negeri Sembilan	1	1	0	0	4	3	+1	3	
6	Selangor MAC	1	1	0	0	3	2	+1	3	
7	Perak	1	0	0	1	3	4	−1	0	
8	KL City	1	0	0	1	2	3	−1	0	
9	Penang	1	0	0	1	4	6	−2	0	
10	KPM-PST Mustangs	1	0	0	1	1	4	−3	0	
11	Kedah	1	0	0	1	3	10	−7	0	
12	Sarawak	1	0	0	1	1	9	−8	0	

Updated to match(es) played on 15 March 2020. Source: FAM
Rules for classification: 1) Points; 2) Goal difference; 3) Number of goals scored.

== Result table ==
Home \ Away	KED	KEL	MUS	KLU	KLC	NSE	PAH	PRK	PEN	SWK	SEL	TER
Kedah	—											
Kelantan		—	4–1									
KPM-PST Mustangs			—									
Kuala Lumpur				—					6–4			
KL City					—							
Negeri Sembilan						—		4–3				
Pahang Rangers							—			9–1		
Perak								—				
Penang									—			
Sarawak										—		
Selangor MAC					3–2						—	
Terengganu	10–3											—

Updated to match(es) played on 15 March 2020. Source: FAM
Legend: Blue = home team win; Yellow = draw; Red = away team win.
For upcoming matches, an "a" indicates there is an article about the rivalry between the two participants.
