= 2017 Liga Futsal Kebangsaan =

Liga Futsal Kebangsaan
- Season: 2017
- Champions: (Malacca) Melaka United
- Matches played: 72
- Goals scored: 624 (8.67 per match)
- Top goalscorer: Azri Rahman (Felda United)
- All statistics correct as of 28 January 2018.

2017 Liga Futsal Kebangsaan (transl. 2017 National Futsal League) will be the tenth season of the National Futsal League, the Malaysian professional futsal league for association football clubs, since its establishment in 2004. FELDA United FC are the defending champions, having won their second title in the 2014-15 season. The league was on hold for 2016 season after a financial problem and postponed to January 2017 for the new season. All matches to be played at Kompleks Sukan UPSI, Tanjung Malim, Perak and Stadium Tertutup SUKPA, Kuantan, Pahang.

== Teams ==
- (Kuala Lumpur) Felda United (2014-15 champions)
- (Kuala Lumpur) KL Petaling Putra
- (Terengganu) T-Team
- (Malacca) Melaka
- (Penang) MBPP
- (Kuala Lumpur) KL TPD
- Perak
- Pahang
- (Kuala Lumpur) KL City

== League table ==
Pos	Team	Pld	W	D	L	GF	GA	GD	Pts
1	Melaka	16	14	1	1	99	32	+67	43
2	FELDA United	16	12	1	3	101	53	+48	37
3	Pahang	16	11	2	3	85	43	+42	35
4	KL City	16	7	5	4	68	56	+12	26
5	Perak	16	7	1	8	64	73	−9	22
6	KL TPD	16	7	0	9	62	64	−2	21
7	T-Team	16	4	0	12	54	89	−35	12
8	MBPP	16	1	3	12	50	98	−48	6
9	KL Petaling Putra	16	1	3	12	41	116	−75	6

Updated to match(es) played on 7 May 2017. Source:
Rules for classification: 1) Points; 2) Goal difference; 3) Number of goals scored.

== Result table ==
Home \ Away	FEL	KLC	KLP	KLT	MBP	MEL	PAH	PRK	TTE
Felda United		4–4	7–6	10–2	5–4	5–6	5–4	2–1	6–2
KL City	3–6		4–4	3–5	7–3	3–3	4–4	3–2	4–3
KL Petaling Putra	2–15	1–6		1–5	3–3	2–6	1–10	5–8	5–2
KL TPD	2–6	1–4	10–1		11–0	1–5	3–7	2–5	3–2
MBPP	3–4	7–8	3–3	3–7		1–12	2–3	5–5	7–9
Melaka United	4–2	4–2	14–0	5–1	5–2		6–1	7–0	9–2
Pahang	5–4	3–3	7–1	4–0	10–2	4–2		6–2	3–4
Perak	2–8	5–3	9–4	5–4	2–3	2–6	2–9		8–4
T–Team	3–12	1–7	7–2	3–5	4–2	4–5	2–5	2–6	

Updated to match(es) played on 6 May 2017. Source: FAM
Legend: Blue = home team win; Yellow = draw; Red = away team win.
