= Kelantan Futsal Team =

Kelantan Futsal
- Full name: Kelantan Futsal Team
- Short name: KFT
- Founded: 2024; 2 years ago
- Head coach: Muhammad Fadhil Yusof
- League: MPFL Division 2
Home colours	Away colours

Kelantan Futsal Team is a professional futsal club based in Kota Bharu, Kelantan, Malaysia. The club currently competes in the MPFL Division 2, the second level of futsal in Malaysia.

== History ==
After the state FA Futsal team got suspended, Kelantan Futsal Team was officially established in 2024. In May 2025, Kelantan Futsal participated in the MPFL Division 2 season.

== Logo history ==
Original logo

== Club officials ==
As of 21 May 2025

Position	Name
Team manager	(Malaysia) Wan Muhammad Firdaus
Assistant manager	(Malaysia) Wan Muhammad Hasbi Wan Juhari
Head coach	(Malaysia) Muhammad Fadhil Yusof
Assistant coach	(Malaysia) Nik Muhammad Amin
Goalkeeper coach	(Malaysia) Wan mohamad Aizat Rozali
Fitness coach	(Malaysia) Muhammad Ariff Rosli
Physiotherapist	(Malaysia) Nek Ahmad Kamil
Kitman	(Malaysia) Muhammad Farid Abdul Aziz
