= 2019 Malaysia Premier Futsal League =

Malaysia Premier Futsal League
- Season: 2019
- Matches: 30
- Goals: 183 (6.1 per match)
- All statistics correct as of 27 July 2019.

2019 Malaysia Premier Futsal League was the 1st season of the Malaysia Premier Futsal League after re-branding from the Liga Futsal Kebangsaan. It is the Malaysian professional futsal league for association football clubs, since its establishment in 2004. Melaka United are the defending champions.

== Team changes ==
=== New teams ===
- Kedah
- Penang
- Selangor

=== Withdrawn teams ===
- Felda United
- Kuantan Rangers
- MBPP
- MPSJ

== Teams ==
For 2019 season, a total of nine clubs compete in league.

| Clubs | Location | Venue |
|---|---|---|
| Kedah | Alor Setar | Sultan Abdul Halim Stadium |
| Kuala Lumpur | Shah Alam | Panasonic Sport Complex |
| KL City | Shah Alam | Panasonic Sport Complex |
| Melaka | Shah Alam | Panasonic Sport Complex |
| Pahang | Kuantan | SUKPA Indoor Stadium |
| Perak | Ipoh | Indera Mulia Stadium |
| Pulau Pinang | Gelugor | Azman Hashim USM Sport Arena |
| Selangor | Shah Alam | Panasonic Sport Complex |
| Terengganu | Kuala Terengganu | Kuala Terengganu State Stadium |

== League table ==
| Pos | Team | Pld | W | D | L | GF | GA | GD | Pts | Qualification or relegation |
|---|---|---|---|---|---|---|---|---|---|---|
| 1 | Selangor | 13 | 10 | 2 | 1 | 47 | 20 | +27 | 32 | Qualification for AFF Futsal Club Championship |
| 2 | Pahang | 11 | 9 | 1 | 1 | 49 | 29 | +20 | 28 | |
| 3 | Perak | 13 | 7 | 2 | 4 | 51 | 40 | +11 | 23 | |
| 4 | Terengganu | 10 | 4 | 2 | 4 | 31 | 27 | +4 | 14 | |
| 5 | Melaka United | 12 | 4 | 2 | 6 | 31 | 33 | −2 | 14 | |
| 6 | Kuala Lumpur | 13 | 3 | 4 | 6 | 29 | 38 | −9 | 13 | |
| 7 | Kedah | 11 | 3 | 3 | 5 | 28 | 35 | −7 | 12 | |
| 8 | Penang | 11 | 3 | 1 | 7 | 28 | 48 | −20 | 10 | |
| 9 | KL City | 12 | 0 | 3 | 9 | 28 | 52 | −24 | 3 | |

Updated to match(es) played on 28 August 2019. Source: FAM
Rules for classification: 1) Points; 2) Goal difference; 3) Number of goals scored.

== Result table ==
| Home \ Away | KED | KUL | KLC | MEL | PAH | PRK | PEN | SEL | TER |
|---|---|---|---|---|---|---|---|---|---|
| Kedah | — | – | – | – | – | 2–5 | – | – | 2–2 |
| Kuala Lumpur | 0–2 | — | – | – | 2–4 | 4–3 | – | 0–1 | – |
| KL City | – | 2–2 | — | 0–2 | – | 0–6 | 5–7 | 1–4 | 2–2 |
| Melaka United | 4–3 | – | – | — | – | 3–4 | 0–1 | – | 4–3 |
| Pahang | 7–3 | – | 4–3 | 8–3 | — | – | – | – | 5–2 |
| Perak | 3–3 | 4–2 | 4–4 | 3–2 | 6–5 | — | – | 2–3 | 3–4 |
| Pulau Pinang | 2–4 | 3–3 | – | – | – | 3–8 | — | 0–6 | – |
| Selangor | – | 3–3 | – | 3–1 | – | 5–0 | – | — | – |
| Terengganu | – | 6–0 | – | – | – | – | 3–1 | 1–2 | — |

Updated to match(es) played on 27 July 2019. Source: FAM
Legend: Blue = home team win; Yellow = draw; Red = away team win.
For upcoming matches, an "a" indicates there is an article about the rivalry between the two participants.
