= Vandinho (futsal player) =

Brazilian futsal player

Personal information
- Full name: Evandro Borges
- Date of birth: 18 June 1998 (age 28)
- Place of birth: Lauro Müller, Brazil
- Position: Winger

Team information
- Current team: Tubarão
- Number: 18

Youth career
- –2013: Anjos do Futsal
- 2013–2016: Tubarão

Senior career*
Years	Team	Apps	(Gls)
2016–	Tubarão	49	(13)

International career
2018–	Brazil		
- * Club domestic league appearances and goals

Evandro Borges (born 18 June 1998), better known as Vandinho, is a Brazilian futsal player who plays for Tubarão and the Brazilian national futsal team as a winger.
