= Football Association of Kelantan =

Malaysian football club

Kelantan Football Association Persatuan Bola Sepak Kelantan
- Founded: 1948; 78 years ago, as Kelantan Amateur Football Association
- Purpose: Football association
- Headquarters: Wisma KAFA, Batu 5 1/2, Kampung Chicha, Jalan Pasir Puteh, 16150
- Location: Kota Bharu, Kelantan, Malaysia
- President: Dato' Sri Hj Afandi Hamzah

Football Association of Kelantan, Kelantan Football Association or Kelantan Amateur Football Association (KAFA; Malay: Persatuan Bolasepak Kelantan) is the governing body of football for the state of Kelantan, Malaysia. KAFA is responsible for coordinating and developing football in the state and has teamed up with the Football Association of Malaysia (FAM) as the official governing body of football in Malaysia.

== History ==
=== Origins ===
The association was founded in 1948 as Kelantan Amateur Football Association (Malay: Persatuan Bola Sepak Amatur Kelantan). In 1951, KAFA announced they want join the 1952 Malaya Cup. The team is based in Kota Bharu, consistently producing the top-class national players.

== FAM suspension ==
The Kelantan Football Association (KAFA) suspended their membership in the Football Association of Malaysia based on FAM's letter dated 21 December 2024, related to the complaint against the conduct of the 65th KAFA Annual Congress.

== Association management ==
Positions	Name
President	(Malaysia) Dato' Sri Hj Afandi Hamzah
General secretary	(Malaysia) Encik Husin bin Hj Deraman

== List of presidents ==
Name	Period
(Malaysia) Datuk Haji Ahmad Rastom Haji Ahmad Maher	1986–1990
(Malaysia) Datuk Haji Wan Hashim Wan Daud	1991–2003
(Malaysia) Ahmad Jazlan Yaakub	2004–2009
(Malaysia) Annuar Musa	8 November 2009 – 8 November 2016
(Malaysia) Bibi Ramjani Ilias Khan	2016–17
(Malaysia) Wan Abdul Rahim Wan Abdullah	2018–2020
(Malaysia) Dato' Sri Hj Afandi Hamzah	2020–2021
(Malaysia) Dato' Shaari Bin Mat Hussain	2021–2024
(Malaysia) Dato' Sri Hj Afandi Hamzah	2024–

== Competitions ==
- Liga Kelantan

== Affiliations ==
=== District Football Association ===
There are 13 football associations affiliated to the KFA.

- Kelantan Malay's FA
- Kelantan Chinese FA
- Kelantan Indian FA
- Kota Bharu FA
- Pasir Mas FA
- Tanah Merah FA
- Tumpat FA
- Gua Musang FA
- Pasir Puteh FA
- Jeli FA
- Machang FA
- Kuala Krai FA
- Bachok FA

=== Notable members ===
Clubs in the top tiers league competitions affiliated to the Kelantan Football Association include:

- Red Warrior, Malaysia Super League
- Kelantan City, Malaysia A1 Semi-Pro League
- The Real Warriors, Malaysia A1 Semi-Pro League
- AZM Rovers, Malaysia A1 Semi-Pro League
- Kelantan Futsal Team, MPFL Division 2

== See also ==
- History of Malaysian football
