= Johor Darul Ta'zim F.C. Futsal =

Futsal club in Johor, Malaysia

JDT Futsal
- Full name: Johor Darul Ta'zim Futsal
- Nickname: Harimau Selatan (Southern Tigers)
- Short name: JDT Futsal
- Founded: 2023; 3 years ago
- Ground: Pasir Gudang Indoor Stadium
- Capacity: 1,000
- Owner: Tunku Ismail Idris
- President: Tunku Aminah Maimunah Iskandariah
- League: Malaysia Premier Futsal League
- Website: https://johorsoutherntigers.my/tags/futsal/
Home colours	Away colours	Third colours

Johor Darul Ta'zim Futsal (commonly referred to as JDT Futsal) is a Malaysian professional futsal club based in Johor Bahru, Johor, that competes in the Malaysia Premier Futsal League (MPFL), the top tier of Malaysian futsal. Established in 2023, the club operates as the indoor football department of Johor Darul Ta'zim F.C. and plays its home matches at the 1,000 capacity Pasir Gudang Indoor Stadium.

== History ==
=== Formation and debut season (2023) ===
In late 2022, Johor Darul Ta'zim owner Tunku Ismail Idris announced the establishment of a dedicated futsal division to expand the club's sporting footprint. Ahead of its inaugural campaign in the 2023 Malaysia Premier Futsal League, the club upgraded the Pasir Gudang Indoor Stadium (Stadium Tertutup MBPG) to meet international standards and appointed Spanish tactician Juan Antonio Miguel Garcia as its first head coach.

JDT Futsal recruited several Malaysian national team players alongside foreign imports, including Brazilian pivot Caio Cesar Garcia Rego. In their debut season, the team finished top of Group B with 13 wins from 14 matches and finished as runners-up in both the MPFL national playoffs and the Malaysia Futsal Cup.

=== Domestic dominance (2024–present) ===
In the 2024 season, JDT Futsal secured their first major silverware by winning the reorganized MPFL Division 1 title with 39 points. They completed a domestic double later that year by defeating Selangor FC 3–2 in the Malaysia Futsal Cup final.

The club successfully defended its league crown in 2025, finishing unbeaten in the regular league campaign to claim back-to-back MPFL Division 1 championships. In the 2026 MPFL season, JDT finished second in the regular league standings before advancing to the play-off semi-finals, where they were eliminated by Pahang Rangers after extra time.

== Stadium ==
JDT Futsal plays its home fixtures at the Pasir Gudang Indoor Stadium (Malay: Stadium Tertutup Majlis Bandaraya Pasir Gudang), located in Pasir Gudang, Johor. The indoor arena has a seating capacity of 1,000 spectators and underwent comprehensive renovations prior to the 2023 season to accommodate top-flight domestic and regional futsal competitions.

== Players ==
=== Current squad ===
As of the 2026 MPFL season

Note: Flags indicate national team as defined under FIFA eligibility rules; some limited exceptions apply. Players may hold more than one non-FIFA nationality.

No.	Pos.	Nation	Player
1	GK	MAS	Aiman Fikry Ramli
2	GK	MAS	Muhammad Ammar Harith
4	DF	MAS	Mohd Firdaus Ambiah
6	DF	MAS	Abu Haniffa Hasan
7	MF	MAS	Mohd Ridzwan Bakri
8	MF	MAS	Mohamad Danial Abdul Dain
9	FW	MAS	Mohamad Awalluddin Mat Nawi
10	FW	BRA	Bruno Taffy
11	FW	ESP	Andrés Alcántara Prieto

No.	Pos.	Nation	Player
12	GK	MAS	Zainulzahin Sinuan
13	DF	MAS	Mahadir Harahap Khairuddin
14	MF	MAS	Syed Aizad Daniel
15	MF	MAS	Muhammad Azri Rahman
16	FW	MAS	Muhammad Ekmal Shahrin
17	MF	MAS	Muhammad Saad Abdul Sani
20	GK	MAS	Muhammad Izham Zulkifli

== League and cup record ==
Champions	Runners-up	Third place

League													Playoffs	Malaysia Futsal Cup	AFF Futsal Club	AFC Futsal Club	
Season	Div.	Teams	Pos.	Pld	W	D	L	GF	GA	GD	Pts	Attendance	Playoffs	Malaysia Futsal Cup	AFF Futsal Club	AFC Futsal Club	
2023	MPFL Group B	14	1st	14	13	0	1	72	25	+47	39	700	Runners up	Runners up	DSQ	not held	
2024	MPFL Division 1	8	1st	14	13	0	1	72	25	+47	39	700	not held	Champion	not held	not held	
2025	MPFL Division 1	8	1st	13	13	0	0	88	28	+60	39		not held	TBA	TBA	TBA	
2026	MPFL	9	2nd	16	13	1	2	127	26	+101	40			not held	not held	Semi-finals	—

== Head coach record ==
As of July 24, 2023

Name	Nationality	From	To	P	W	D	L	GF	GA	Win%
Miguel Garcia Juan Antonio	Spain	February 24, 2023	2024							

== Honours ==
=== Domestic ===
==== League ====
- MPFL Division 1

(gold) Winners (2): 2024 & 2025

- Malaysia Premier Futsal League

(silver) Runners-up (1): 2023

==== Cup ====
- Malaysia Futsal Cup

(gold) Winners (1): 2024

(silver) Runners-up (1): 2023
