= Well Pereira =

Brazilian futsal player

Personal information
- Full name: Wellington Pereira Rodrigues Adão
- Date of birth: 15 January 1993 (age 33)
- Place of birth: Santo André, Brazil
- Position: Pivot

Team information
- Current team: Copagril
- Number: 8

Youth career
- 2000–2005: União Mauá
- 2006–2010: Ribeirão Pires
- 2007–2010: Santo André (football)
- 2010: BASF/Suvinil
- 2011–2012: Palmeiras
- 2013: Corinthians

Senior career*
Years	Team	Apps	(Gls)
2014	Bento Gonçalves		
2015	Mogi das Cruzes		
2015	São Lucas		
2015	São Caetano		
2016	Jaraguá	6	(2)
2017	Intelli	17	(15)
2018	Pato Futsal	26	(11)
2019–	Copagril		

International career
2017–	Brazil		
- * Club domestic league appearances and goals as of 00:00, 27 February 2019 (UTC)

Wellington Pereira Rodrigues Adão (born 15 January 1993), commonly known as Well, is a Brazilian futsal player who plays as a pivot for Copagril and the Brazilian national futsal team.
