= Felipe Souza (footballer, born 1991) =

Brazilian footballer

Personal information
- Full name: Felipe de Almeida Souza
- Date of birth: 4 June 1991 (age 35)
- Place of birth: Santo André, São Paulo, Brazil
- Height: 1.83 m (6 ft 0 in)
- Position: Midfielder

Senior career*
Years	Team	Apps	(Gls)
2015	ECUS		
2016–2017	Oeste	0	(0)
2017	Melaka United	9	(4)
2018	Inter de Lages	9	(0)
2018–2019	Najran		
2020–2021	São Bernardo-SP	33	(7)
2020–2021	Portuguesa	7	(0)
2020–2021	Resende	11	(0)
2023	São Bernardo-SP	9	(0)
- * Club domestic league appearances and goals as of 1 January 2024

Felipe de Almeida Souza (born 4 June 1991 in Santo André, São Paulo), sometimes known as just Felipe is a Brazilian professional footballer. He plays mainly as an attacking midfielder, but can also play as a central midfielder.

== Club career ==
=== Melaka United ===
On 12 June 2017, Felipe Souza signed with Malaysian club Melaka United to compete in Malaysia Super League following the released of club previous foreign players Ezequiel Agüero and Godwin Antwi. Felipe made his league debut on 1 July against PKNS, and scored his first goal during that match.
