= Malaysian Armed Forces Football Association =

Malaysian football association

Malaysian Armed Forces Football Association Persatuan Bolasepak Angkatan Tentera Malaysia
- Founded: 1920; 106 years ago
- Headquarters: QMQ 71 Lorong Kubu, Jalan Padang Tembak, 50634
- Location: Kuala Lumpur, Federal Territories of Malaysia
- President: Malek Razak Sulaiman

Malaysian Armed Forces Football Association (commonly abbreviated as AFFA; Malay: Persatuan Bolasepak Angkatan Tentera Malaysia) is the governing body of football representing the Malaysian Armed Forces, Malaysia. AFFA is a member of the Football Association of Malaysia (FAM), the official governing body of football in Malaysia.

== History ==
The Malaysian Armed Forces Football Association (AFFA) was established in 1920, being one of the earliest football teams to exist in Malaysia. The British forces were the first to introduce football competitions in Malaysia by creating the HMS Malaya Cup (now known as the Malaysia Cup), which was contested by states including Singapore in 1921. However, in line with the development of Malaysian football towards the professional era, the team has joined the Liga Semi-Pro which was first introduced in 1989.

== Association management ==
Position	Name
President	(Malaysia) Gen. Datuk Malek Razak Sulaiman
Deputy president	(Malaysia) Lt. Gen. Dato’ Hj Ahmad bin Abu Bakar
General secretary	(Malaysia) Lt. Col. Ismazaini bin Ismail
Treasurer	(Malaysia) Myr. Yusri bin Darus

== Competitions ==
The Armed Forces Football Association organises the Liga Tiga Perkhidmatan for its regional level clubs.

== Notable affiliations ==
- Armed Forces F.C.
- Tentera Darat F.A.
- Royal Malaysian Navy F.A.
- RMAF Hornet F.A.
- PUSEN Hornet
- Royal Malay Force Regiment F.C.
- Armed Forces F.A. Futsal

== See also ==
- Malaysia Premier Futsal League
- Malaysia Futsal Cup
- History of Malaysian football
