= Kedah Football Association =

Malaysian football association

Kedah Football Association Persatuan Bola Sepak Kedah
- Founded: 1924; 102 years ago, as Kedah Amateur Football Association
- Headquarters: Aras 1, Astaka Utama Stadium Darul Aman, Jalan Stadium 05100
- Location: Alor Star, Kedah Darul Aman, Malaysia
- Coordinates: 6.136021°N 100.371764°E
- President: Muhammad Sanusi Md Nor

Kedah Football Association (KFA; Malay: Persatuan Bola Sepak Kedah Darul Aman) is the governing body of football for the state of Kedah, Malaysia. KFA is responsible for coordinating and developing football in the state of Kedah with the Football Association of Malaysia (FAM) as the official governing body of football in Malaysia.

== History ==
The football team was founded in 1924 by Tunku Yaacob ibni Sultan Abdul Hamid Halim Shah as president, though they had limited success until the appointment of Ahmad Basri Akil in 1985. Under him, the team qualified for six Malaysia Cup final matches between 1987 and 1993, winning 2 cup titles, one league title and one FA Cup title.

== Management ==
Position	Name
President	(Malaysia) Muhammad Sanusi Md Nor
General secretary	(Malaysia) Mohd Firdaus Ahmad

== Competitions ==
- Liga THB-KFA
- THB-KFA FA Cup

== Affiliations ==
Clubs in the league competition affiliated to the Kedah Football Association include:

- Kedah FA, Malaysia A1 Semi-Pro League
- Kedah FA U20, Piala Presiden
- Kedah Darul Aman
- Kuala Muda
- Kubang Pasu-MPKP
- Kedah FA Futsal team, MPFL Division 1

=== District football associations ===
There are 13 football associations affiliated to the KFA.

- Kedah Malay's FA
- (Kedah) Baling FA
- (Kedah) Bandar Baharu FA
- (Kedah) Kota Setar FA
- (Kedah) Kuala Muda FA
- (Kedah) Kubang Pasu FA
- (Kedah) Kulim FA
- (Kedah) Langkawi FA
- (Kedah) Padang Terap FA
- (Kedah) Pendang FA
- (Kedah) Pokok Sena FA
- (Kedah) Sik FA
- (Kedah) Yan FA

== Logos ==
These are the logos that have been used by the Kedah Football Association.

1924–1988

1987–1988

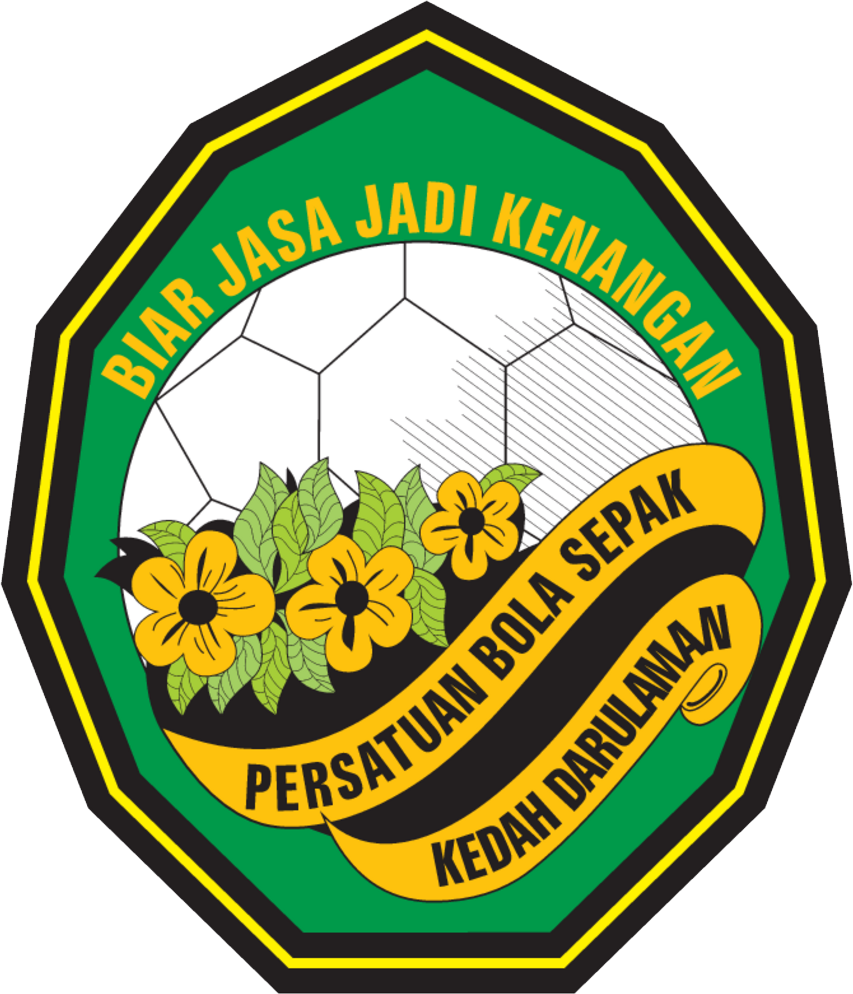
1988–2004

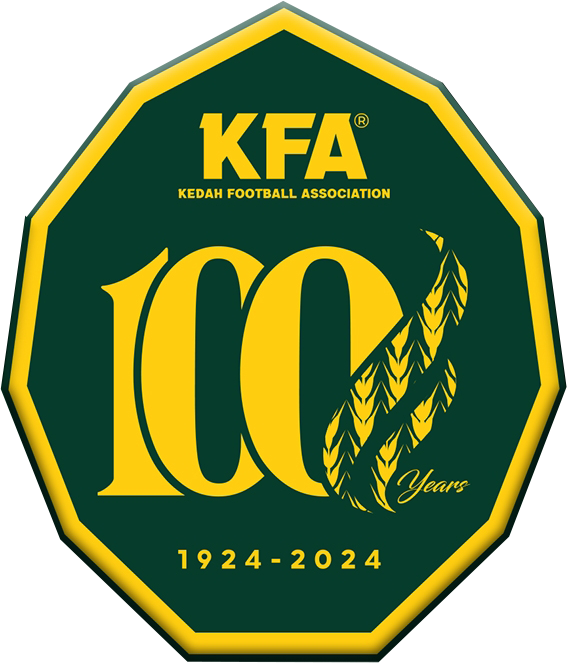
100 years KFA

== See also ==
- History of Malaysian football
- Kedah Darul Aman FC–Kedah FA state football team schism
