= Pahang Rangers F.C. =

Futsal club in Kuantan, Malaysia

Pahang Rangers
- Full name: Pahang Rangers Futsal Club
- Nickname: Tok Gajah (The Elephants)
- Short name: PRFC
- Founded: November 2016; 9 years ago (as Kuantan Rangers F.C.); 12 February 2019; 7 years ago (as Pahang Rangers F.C.)
- Ground: SUKPA Indoor Stadium
- Capacity: 5,000
- Head coach: Eloy Alonso
- League: MPFL Division 1
- 2025: MPFL Division 1, 2nd of 8
- Website: https://pahangrangers.com/
| Home colours | Away colours | Third colours |

Pahang Rangers Futsal Club is a professional futsal club based in Kuantan, Pahang. The club competes in the MPFL Division 1, the national futsal league in Malaysia. Founded in 2016 as Kuantan Rangers Futsal Club, it competed as an amateur futsal club before rebranding to Pahang Rangers to became fully professional in 2019.

In terms of success, the club has won 1 MPFL title, 1 Brunei Futsal League title and 1 Malaysia Futsal Cup. Both of the MPFL and Malaysia Futsal Cup titles were won in 2023 season with Gerard Casas as the head coach of the club.

== History ==
=== Formation and early years (2016–2018) ===
Kuantan Rangers F.C. was established in November 2016 and participated in the qualifying round of the 2017 Liga Futsal Kebangsaan. They failed to qualify from the first try. Kuantan Rangers took part in the 2017 Brunei Futsal League as an invited team, ending the season by winning the league undefeated, with a record of seven wins and two draws.

For the first time in their history, Kuantan Rangers qualified for the Liga Futsal Kebangsaan 2018. They finished in 5th place with eight wins, three draws and seven losses. Iqbal Aikal became the club's top goalscorer with 10 goals.

=== Rebranding to Pahang Rangers F.C. (2019–present) ===
For the 2019 MPFL season, Kuantan Rangers went through a rebranding process. On 16 May 2019, Pahang Rangers announced Taufik Yaiyah as the new coach. In that season, the team began a rivalry with Selangor MAC after a 0–6 loss in the pre-season friendly match. On 21 August 2019, Pahang Rangers hosted the Selangor MAC at the SUKMA Indoor Stadium; the game ended 4–2, with Pahang Rangers securing the win. The club ended the season finished in 2nd place with 10 wins, 4 draws and 2 losses. On 21 November 2019, the club's head coach, Taufik Yaiyah, parted ways with the club. On January 7, 2020, the club announced that Gerard Casas would be their new coach. In the 2020 MPFL season, the club played only one game, as the Football Association of Malaysia (FAM) announced that the competition would be cancelled due to the COVID-19 pandemic in Malaysia. The 2021 MPFL season was also cancelled. The club participated in 2021 AFF Futsal Cup. They ended the competition with one win and 3 losses.

In the 2022 MPFL season, the club ended in 2nd place, finishing once again behind Selangor MAC with 10 wins, three draws, and one loss. The club's only loss was against PDRM with a score of 3–4. Also, in the first edition of the Malaysia Futsal Cup, they lost to Selangor MAC in the final with a score of 3–4.

==== Double champion (2023) ====
On 14 December 2022, the club officially extended Gerard Casas' contract for one year. They participated in the 2023 AFF Futsal Club Championship, finishing the competition in fourth place with a record of one win and three losses. Meanwhile, they finished MPFL group A in first place with a record of eleven wins and one draw, thus qualifying for the playoffs. They defeated holders Selangor MAC in the semi-finals and JDT in the final to capture the first MPFL title in the club's history. They also won their first Malaysia Futsal Cup title after beating Johor Darul Ta'zim in the final. With these achievements, the club decided to extend Gerard Casas' contract for another year.

== Colours and badge ==
=== Colours ===
The official colors of Pahang Rangers, reflecting the rich heritage and identity of the state, are a striking combination of black and white. These colors hold significant symbolic value as they mirror the distinctive hues present in both the flag and coat of arms of Pahang.

=== Badge ===
The emblem of the club, fashioned in the shape of a shield, showcases the iconic black and white color scheme that has become synonymous with Pahang Rangers. At the center of this emblem, an elephant head takes center stage, symbolizing strength, resilience, and the spirit of the team. The inclusion of stalks of rice on either side pays homage to the agricultural richness of the region. Adding a touch of grandeur, a pair of tusks adorns the bottom of the emblem, further emphasizing the club's commitment to power and tenacity.

== Head coaches ==
=== List of Pahang Rangers F.C. head coaches ===
| No. | Name | Nationality | From | To |
|---|---|---|---|---|
| 1 | Taufik Yaiyah | Malaysia | 16 May 2019 | 21 November 2019 |
| 2 | Gerard Casas | Spain | 7 January 2020 | 10 August 2024 |
| 3 | Luis Fonseca | Spain | 27 August 2024 | 11 October 2025 |
| 4 | Eloy Alonso | Spain | 26 February 2026 | Present |

== Honours ==
Pahang Rangers' first domestic trophy was the Malaysia Premier Futsal League, which it won in the club's fourth season. In the same season, the club won the Malaysia Futsal Cup.

| Type | Competition | Titles | Seasons |
|---|---|---|---|
| Domestic | Malaysia Premier Futsal League | 1 | 2023 |
| Domestic | Malaysia Futsal Cup | 1 | 2023 |
| Domestic | Brunei Futsal League | 1 | 2017 |
