= Football Association Penang =

Malaysian football club

Penang Football Association Persatuan Bola Sepak Pulau Pinang
- Founded: 1920; 106 years ago (unofficial); 21 October 1921; 105 years ago as FAP
- Purpose: Football association
- Headquarters: No. 5, Jalan Sepoy Lines
- Location: George Town, Penang, Malaysia
- President: Encik Mohd Azizudin bin Mohd Shariff
- Website: Website

Penang Football Association or Football Association of Penang (FAP; Malay: Persatuan Bola Sepak Pulau Pinang) is the governing body of football for the state of Penang, Malaysia. Established on 21 October 1921, it is one of the oldest football associations in Malaysia and Asia. The FAP oversees the development and coordination of football activities in Penang and is affiliated with the Football Association of Malaysia (FAM) as the official governing body of football in Malaysia.

== History ==
Football in Penang dates back to the early 20th century, with the first league established in 1905 by the YMCA . FAP was officially founded in 1921, and its representative team, Penang FA (now Penang F.C.), has a rich history in Malaysian football. The team is the fourth most successful in Malaysian football history, with 16 titles .

Penang FC plays its home matches at the City Stadium (Stadium Bandaraya Pulau Pinang) in George Town. Built in 1932, it is the oldest stadium still in use in Malaysia, with a capacity of approximately 25,000 spectators. The stadium is renowned for its passionate home support, known as the "Keramat Roar." Notably, in 2016, Penang player Mohd Faiz Subri scored a remarkable free-kick goal at this stadium, earning him the FIFA Puskás Award in 2017.

== Association management ==
Positions	Name
President	(Malaysia) Encik Mohd Azizudin bin Mohd Shariff
Deputy President	(Malaysia) Encik Lau Keng Ee
General secretary	(Malaysia) Encik Mohd Hassan Abrar bin Mat Akhir

== Affiliations ==
Clubs in the top tiers league competition affiliated to the Penang Football Association include:

- Penang, Malaysia Super League
- USM, Malaysia A2 Amateur League
- Penang FA futsal team, MPFL Division 2
- Bukit Tambun, Malaysia A3 Community League
- Sungai Ara, Penang State League
- SDM Kepala Batas
- PBAPP

== See also ==
- Football Association of Malaysia
- Malaysia Premier Futsal League
- History of Malaysian Football
