= Anoru =

Subdistrict in Pattani Province

Anoru ตำบลอาเนาะรู
- Subdistrict
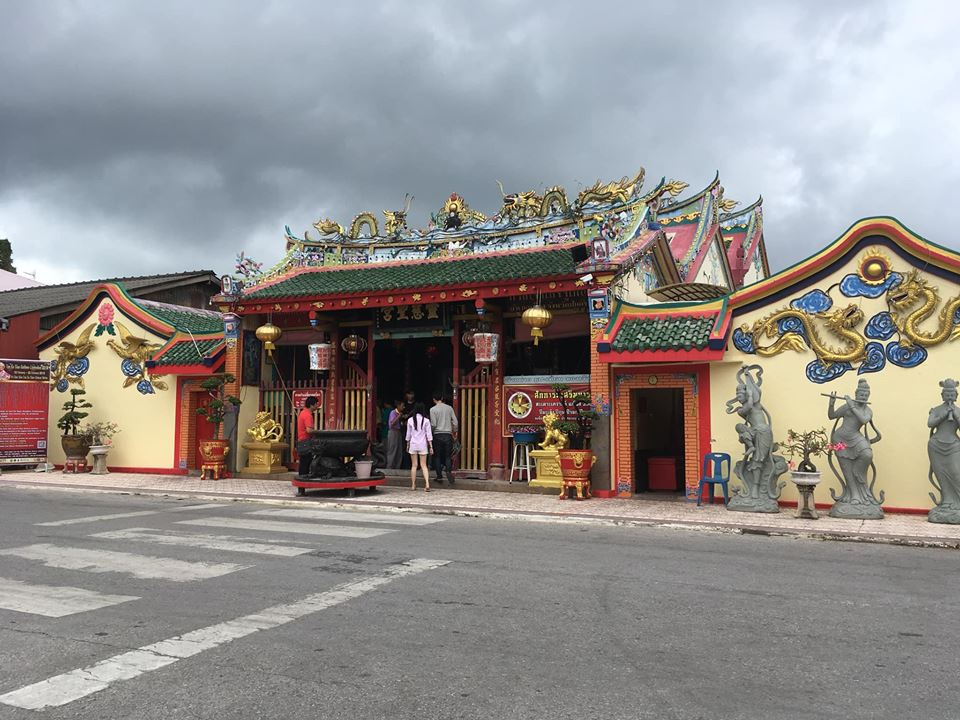
- Country: Thailand
- Province: Pattani
- District: Pattani

Population (2025)
  - Total: 7,063
- Time zone: UTC+7 (ICT)

Anoru (Thai: ตำบลอาเนาะรู, pronounced [ʔā.nɔ̀ʔ.rūː]) is a tambon (subdistrict) of Mueang Pattani District, in Pattani province, Thailand. In 2025, it had a population of 7,063 people. It is the birthplace of Haji Sulong, Malay educator and community leader.

== Etymology ==
The name Anoru came from the Malay phrase Anor Rhu or Anak Rhu, which translates to "child of the casuarina trees".

== History ==
The area of Anoru was part of the Pattani Kingdom before being colonized by the Kingdom of Thailand. It was made a tambon in the Mueang Pattani District during the 20th century.

=== Lim Ko Niao ===
According to the Patani legend, Lim Ko Niao went looking for Lim Toh Khiam when their mother became ill, swearing not to return until she had brought him back. She found Lim Toh Khiam in Patani, where he had married the daughter of the Sultan, converted to Islam and was building a mosque for the Queen. However, he refused to return and fought her instead. She lost, and she committed suicide by hanging from a cashew tree. Before she died, she cursed her brother's mosque, Krue Se Mosque, so that it could never be completed. Every time someone tried to finish the building, a lightning would strike the building. In mourning, the local Chinese later made of statue of her with wood from the tree she had hung herself, and created a small shrine for her in Anoru.

== Geography ==
Anoru covers part of the Pattani River. It is bordered by neighboring subdistricts of Mueang Pattani District:

- North: Sabarang
- East: Chabang Tiko
- South: Rusamilae
- West: Pattani River

== Administration ==
The tambon is divided into seven administrative villages (mubans).

No.	Name	Thai	Population
1.	Anoru	อาเนาะรู	1,746
2.	Anosu-nga	อาเนาะซูงา	936
3.	Khlong Chang	คลองช้าง	1360
4.	Hua Talat	หัวตลาด	1,450
5.	Talat Tetwiwat	ตลากเทศวิวัฒน์	416
6.	Talat Torung	ตลาดโต้รุ่ง	1,040
7.	Namsai	น้ำใส	115

== Transportation ==
Anoru is accesible through the roadways that passed in Pattani, connecting to Highway 42 leading to Yala and Songkhla.

== Tourist Destinations ==
- Pattani Central Mosque
- Wat Tani Narasamoson
- Wat Nikon Chanaram
- Leng Chu Kiang Shrine

== Notable people ==
- Lim Ko Niao – pirate, sister of Lim Toh Khiam
- Charoen Suepsaeng – politician
- Haji Sulong – teacher, community leader
