= 2022 Malaysia Futsal Cup =

Tournament details
- Country: Malaysia
- Dates: 18 June – 23 July 2022
- Teams: 8

Final positions
- Champions: Selangor MAC (1st title)
- Runners-up: Pahang Rangers

Tournament statistics
- Matches played: 14
- Goals scored: 90 (6.43 per match)
- Attendance: 11,074 (791 per match)
- Top goal scorer(s): Ridzwan Bakri; Amirul Radzi (6 goals each)

Awards
- Best player: Khairul Effendy

The 2022 Malaysia Futsal Cup (known as CUCKOO Malaysia Futsal Cup) was the first season of the Malaysia Futsal Cup, the main national futsal knockout cup competition in Malaysia. Eight teams contested the competition proper, with the winner qualifying for the 2022 AFF Futsal Cup.

Selangor MAC won its first Malaysia Futsal Cup after defeating Pahang Rangers in the final. This also resulted in qualification to the group stage of the AFF's 2022 AFF Futsal Cup competition.

== Round and dates ==
The schedule of the competition was as follows.

Schedule for 2022 Malaysia Futsal Cup
Round		Match dates	Number of fixtures	Teams
Quarter-finals	First leg	18 June	4	8 → 4
Quarter-finals	Second leg	25 June	4	8 → 4
Semi-finals	First leg	3 July	2	4→ 2
Semi-finals	Second leg	16–17 July	2	4→ 2
Third place		23 July	1	2 → 1
Final		23 July	1	2 → 1

== Teams ==
A total of eight teams participated in the 2022 Malaysia Futsal Cup competition proper. Only top eight teams in 2022 Malaysia Premier Futsal League can qualify to 2022 Malaysia Futsal Cup.

2022 Malaysia Futsal Cup teams
Team	Position in league
Negeri Sembilan	3rd
Pahang Rangers	2nd
PDRM	5th
Penang	4th
Selangor MAC	1st
Selangor TOT United	6th
Shah Alam City	8th
Terengganu	7th

== Bracket ==
Quarter-finals
Selangor MAC	2	5	7
Shah Alam City	1	0	1
Negeri Sembilan	3	2	5
Selangor TOT United	1	5	6
Pulau Pinang	3	7	10
PDRM	4	2	6
Pahang Rangers	3	2	5
Terengganu	2	1	3

Semi-finals
Selangor MAC	6	5	11
Selangor TOT United	6	3	9
Pulau Pinang	3	3	6
Pahang Rangers	2	7	9

Final
Selangor MAC	4
Pahang Rangers	3
Third place
Selangor TOT United	3
Pulau Pinang	2

== Quarter-finals ==
=== Summary ===
The first leg will be played on 18 June 2022 and the second leg will be played on 25 June 2022.

Team 1	Agg.	Team 2	1st leg	2nd leg
Selangor MAC	7–1	Shah Alam City	2–1	5–0
Negeri Sembilan	5–6	Selangor TOT United	3–1	2–5
Pulau Pinang	10–6	PDRM	3–4	7–2
Pahang Rangers	5–3	Terengganu	3–2	2–1

=== Matches ===
18 June 2022
11:00

Selangor MAC	2–1	Shah Alam City
Silva Matheus 28'; Ekmal Shahrin 33'	Report	Saiful Ahmad 31'

Panasonic Sports Complex, Shah Alam
Attendance: 280
Referee: Norafendy Norhayalan
25 June 2022
10:30

Shah Alam City	0–5	Selangor MAC
	Report	Fariq Mohammad 8'; Fariq Mohammad 13'; Khairul Effendy 20'; Akmal Yazadh 25'; Hikmal Firdaus 40'

Panasonic Sports Complex, Shah Alam
Attendance: 350
Referee: Azale Nidzar

Selangor MAC won 7–1 on aggregate.

18 June 2022
14:00

Negeri Sembilan	3–1	Selangor TOT United
Sirhan Aiman 3'; Addli Husin 21' (o.g.); Navin Das Arokiadass 23'	Report	Shamsuri Saleh 39' (pen.)

Panasonic Sports Complex, Shah Alam
Attendance: 150
Referee: Helday Idang
25 June 2022
17:30

Selangor TOT United	5–2	Negeri Sembilan
Hazizi Mansor 4'; Nurasyraaf Azle 7'; Shamsuri Saleh 10', 38'; Aiman Fikri 35' (o.g.)	Report	Nazri Yunus 18'; Tarmizi Ghafar 40'

Panasonic Sports Complex, Shah Alam
Attendance: 312
Referee: Syahrizal Razali

Selangor TOT United won 6–5 on aggregate.

18 June 2022
17:00

Pulau Pinang	3–4	PDRM
Aizat Saari 17'; Iqmal Najmie 20'; Amirul Radzi 28'	Report	Afif Najmi 1'; Shafiq Tahir 22'; Aniq Syazni 27'; Razin Rahim 31'

Panasonic Sports Complex, Shah Alam
Attendance: 180
Referee: Asri Zakaria
25 June 2022
20:00

PDRM	2–7	Pulau Pinang
Ridhwan Zainal 5'; Alif Iqwan 35'	Report	Amirul Radzi 2', 12'; Ammar Shafiq 15', 16'; Hamzah Ahmad 20', 32'; Iqmal Najmie 25'

Panasonic Sports Complex, Shah Alam
Attendance: 200
Referee: Syahir Nizam

Pulau Pinang won 10–6 on aggregate.

18 June 2022
20:00

Pahang Rangers	3–2	Terengganu
Ridzwan Bakri 19'; Akmarulnizam 25'; Saiful Nizam 29'	Report	Fitrah Mohamad 2', 35'

Sukpa Indoor Stadium, Kuantan
Attendance: 2350
Referee: Faiz Jamaluddin
25 June 2022
14:00

Terengganu	1–2	Pahang Rangers
Shafiq Azni 36'	Report	Abu Haniffa Hassan 18'; Ridzwan Bakri 24'

Panasonic Sports Complex, Shah Alam
Attendance: 287
Referee: Norafendy Norhayalan

Pahang Rangers won 5–3 on aggregate.

== Semi-finals ==
=== Summary ===
The first leg will be played on 3 July 2022 and the second leg will be played on 16 and 17 July 2022.

Team 1	Agg.	Team 2	1st leg	2nd leg
Selangor MAC	11–9	Selangor TOT United	6–6	5–3
Pulau Pinang	6–9	Pahang Rangers	3–2	3–7

=== Matches ===
3 July 2022
17:00

Selangor MAC	6–6	Selangor TOT United
Firdaus Ambiah 7'; Silva Matheus 8', 22', 26'; Fariq Mohammad 9'; Akmal Yazadh 26'	Report	Hazizi Mansor 9'; Aidil Shahril 12'; Shamsuri Saleh 24'; Anton Nugroho 26'; Nurasyraaf Azle 29'; Azlan Azwar 34'

Panasonic Sports Complex, Shah Alam
Attendance: 700
Referee: Asri Zakaria
17 July 2022
20:00

Selangor TOT United	3–5	Selangor MAC
Azim Mohammad 15'; Shamsuri Saleh 18'; Aidil Shahril 27'	Report	Azwann Ismail 7'; Azri Rahman 7'; Saad Sani 18'; Akmal Yazadh 24'; Syahir Iqbal 25'

Panasonic Sports Complex, Shah Alam
Attendance: 737
Referee: Norafendy Norhayalan

Selangor MAC won 11–9 on aggregate.

3 July 2022
20:00

Pulau Pinang	3–2	Pahang Rangers
Hamzah Ahmad 11'; Amirul Radzi 12'; Aizat Saari 37'	Report	Ridzwan Bakri 23'; Yazid Kamaruzuan 30'

Panasonic Sports Complex, Shah Alam
Attendance: 650
Referee: Faiz Jamaluddin
16 July 2022
20:00

Pahang Rangers	7–3	Pulau Pinang
Abu Haniffa Hassan 5'; Awalluddin Mat Nawi 5', 6'; Yazid Kamaruzuan 16'; Ridzwan Bakri 18', 25'; Syarul Nizam 23' (o.g.)	Report	Hamzah Ahmad 3'; Amirul Radzi 9'; Iqmal Najmie 37'

Sukpa Indoor Stadium, Kuantan
Attendance: 3700
Referee: Fazleem Rosli

Pahang Rangers won 9–6 on aggregate.

== Third place ==
The third place match was played on 23 July 2022 at Panasonic Sports Complex in Shah Alam.

23 July 2022
17:00

Selangor TOT United	3–2	Pulau Pinang
Aidil Shahril 10'; Hazreen Ali 25'; Hazizi Mansor 40'	Report	Nazrin Ashraf 9'; Amirul Radzi 12'

Panasonic Sports Complex, Shah Alam
Attendance: 380
Referee: Syahrizal Razali

== Final ==
The final match was played on 23 July 2022 at Panasonic Sports Complex in Shah Alam.

23 July 2022
20:00

Selangor MAC	4–3	Pahang Rangers
Khairul Effendy 21', 30'; Firdaus Ambiah 30', 37'	Report	Ridzwan Bakri 20'; Farhan Anuar 37'; Akmarulnizam 40'

Panasonic Sports Complex, Shah Alam
Attendance: 798
Referee: Helday Idang

== Statistics ==
=== Top goalscorers ===
Rank	Player	Team	Goals
1	(Malaysia) Ridzwan Bakri	Pahang Rangers	6
1	(Malaysia) Amirul Radzi	Pulau Pinang	6
3	(Malaysia) Shamsuri Saleh	Selangor TOT United	5
4	(Malaysia) Hamzah Ahmad	Pulau Pinang	4
4	(Brazil) Silva Matheus	Selangor MAC	4
6	(Malaysia) Iqmal Najmie	Pulau Pinang	3
6	(Malaysia) Firdaus Ambiah	Selangor MAC	3
6	(Malaysia) Khairul Effendy	Selangor MAC	3
6	(Malaysia) Akmal Yazadh	Selangor MAC	3
6	(Malaysia) Fariq Mohammad	Selangor MAC	3
6	(Malaysia) Hazizi Mansor	Selangor TOT United	3
6	(Malaysia) Shahril Rosli	Selangor TOT United	3

=== Most Valuable Player ===
- (Malaysia) Khairul Effendy (Selangor MAC)
