= 2023 Malaysia Futsal Cup =

Tournament details
- Dates: Qualifying: 29 July; Competition proper: 19 August–10 September 2023
- Teams: Competition proper: 8 Total: 10

Tournament statistics
- Matches played: 14
- Goals scored: 102 (7.29 per match)
- Attendance: 9,997 (714 per match)
- Top scorer(s): Amin Nasrollah; Ridzwan Bakri (5 goals each)
- Best player: Ridzwan Bakri
- (Note: All statistics do not include qualifying play-offs)

The 2023 Malaysia Futsal Cup was the 2nd season of the Malaysia Futsal Cup. This competition is open to the top 5 teams in each group in the Malaysian Premier Futsal League this season.

Selangor MAC are the defending champions, having beaten Pahang Rangers 4–3 in the previous season's final.

== Schedule ==
The schedule of the competition was as follows.

Schedule for 2023 Malaysia Futsal Cup
| Phase | | Number of fixtures | Date |
Qualifying
| Play-offs | | 2 | 29 July 2023 |
Competition proper
| Quarter-finals | First leg | 4 | 19 August 2023 |
| Quarter-finals | Second leg | 4 | 23–24 August 2023 |
| Semi-finals | First leg | 2 | 27–28 August 2023 |
| Semi-finals | Second leg | 2 | 2 September 2023 |
| Final | | 1 | 10 September 2023 |

== Teams and draw ==
Only the top 5 teams in each group in the Malaysian Premier Futsal League this season taking part. The top 3 teams in each group automatically qualify to the competition while the remaining 4 teams will enter the qualifying play-offs. The draw was held on 1 August 2023.

2023 MPFL (Group A)
| Rank | Team | Qualification |
|---|---|---|
| 1 | Pahang Rangers | Qualify |
| 2 | Pulau Pinang | Qualify |
| 3 | Terengganu | Qualify |
| 4 | Sabah | Play-off |
| 5 | ATM | Play-off |
| 6 | KPT–PST Mustangs | Did not qualify |
| 7 | Kedah | Did not qualify |

2023 MPFL (Group B)
| Rank | Team | Qualification |
|---|---|---|
| 1 | Johor Darul Ta'zim | Qualify |
| 2 | Selangor MAC | Qualify |
| 3 | Selangor TOT United | Qualify |
| 4 | Shah Alam City | Play-off |
| 5 | KL City | Play-off |
| 6 | PFA Odin Sarawak | Did not qualify |
| 7 | Kuala Lumpur | Did not qualify |

Teams enter the quarter-finals.
Teams enter the play-offs.
Teams did not qualify.

== Qualifying round ==
=== Play-off round ===
| Team 1 | Score | Team 2 |
|---|---|---|
| Sabah | 1–4 | KL City |
| Shah Alam City | 6–3 | ATM |

==== Matches ====
29 July 2023
15:00 UTC+8

| Sabah | 1–4 | KL City |
|---|---|---|
| Faizal Abdul Rahman 22' | Report | Muzhaffar Tahar 11'; Adam Syahmi Rosli 30'; Anzar 36'; Dinesh Kumar 40' |

Panasonic National Sport Complex, Shah Alam
Attendance: 100
Referee: Norafendy Norhayalan

29 July 2023
18:00 UTC+8

| Shah Alam City | 6–3 | ATM |
|---|---|---|
| Well Pereira 3', 8', 23', 32', 32'; Aliff Roslan 25' | Report | Amirul Asyran Aminuddin 28'; Raziman Opao 32', 40' |

Panasonic National Sport Complex, Shah Alam
Attendance: 160
Referee: Mohd Redha Rajab

== Bracket ==
Quarterfinals
Selangor TOT United | 5 | 4 | 9
Pahang Rangers | 4 | 7 | 11
Terengganu | 5 | 3 | 8
Pulau Pinang | 2 | 2 | 4
Shah Alam City | 3 | 4 | 7
Selangor MAC | 6 | 2 | 8
KL City | 1 | 3 | 4
Johor Darul Ta'zim | 3 | 3 | 6

Semifinals
Pahang Rangers | 7 | 7 | 14
Terengganu | 0 | 3 | 3
Selangor MAC | 0 | 3 | 3
Johor Darul Ta'zim | 3 | 5 | 8

Finals
Pahang Rangers | 4(3)
Johor Darul Ta'zim | 4(1)
Third place
Terengganu | 2
Selangor MAC | 7

== Quarter-finals ==
=== Summary ===
The first leg will be played on 19 August 2023 and the second leg will be played on 23 & 24 August 2023.

| Team 1 | Agg. | Team 2 | 1st leg | 2nd leg |
|---|---|---|---|---|
| Selangor TOT United | 9–11 | Pahang Rangers | 5–4 | 4–7 |
| Terengganu | 8–4 | Pulau Pinang | 5–2 | 3–2 |
| Shah Alam City | 7–8 | Selangor MAC | 3–6 | 4–2 |
| KL City | 4–6 | Johor Darul Ta'zim | 1–3 | 3–3 |

=== Matches ===
19 August 2023
17:00 UTC+8

| Selangor TOT United | 5–4 | Pahang Rangers |
|---|---|---|
| Guntur Sulistyo 11', 28'; Wan Raziq 14'; Helio Neto 19', 24' | Report | Mahadir Khairuddin 4'; Akmarulnizam 15'; Harith Na'im 29'; Sérgio Jamur 39' |

Panasonic National Sport Complex, Shah Alam
Attendance: 400
Referee: Fazleem Rosli
23 August 2023
20:30 UTC+8

| Pahang Rangers | 7–4 | Selangor TOT United |
|---|---|---|
| Amin Nasrollah 1', 10'; Aliff Roslan 25' | Report | Amirul Asyran Aminuddin 28'; Raziman Opao 32', 40' |

SUKPA Indoor Stadium, Kuantan
Attendance: 1752
Referee: Amirul Aizat

Pahang Rangers won 11–9 on aggregate.

19 August 2023
21:00 UTC+8

| Terengganu | 5–2 | Pulau Pinang |
|---|---|---|
| Supakorn Sangom 10', 26', 38'; Fitrah Mohamad 19'; Hafizi Ismail 31' | Report | Tuah Eizlan 7'; Firdaus Zulkefli 36' |

Kuala Terengganu State Stadium, Kuala Terengganu
Attendance: 250
Referee: Faes Afni Zaaba
23 August 2023
20:30 UTC+8

| Pulau Pinang | 2–3 | Terengganu |
|---|---|---|
| Razin Rahim 29'; Shamsuri Saleh 37' | Report | Supakorn Sangom 18'; Syed Shahrul Niezam 35'; Amirrul Izzad 36' |

Balik Pulau Sport Complex, Balik Pulau
Attendance: 160
Referee: Fazleem Rosli

Terengganu won 8–4 on aggregate.

19 August 2023
21:00 UTC+8

| Shah Alam City | 3–6 | Selangor MAC |
|---|---|---|
| Well Pereira 10', 32'; Zainal Abidin 36' | Report | Bukhari Samsudin 20'; Faris Johan 22', 35'; Fariq Mohammad 26'; Azamuddin Hasan 37'; Imran Samsudin 39' (o.g.) |

Panasonic National Sport Complex, Shah Alam
Attendance: 300
Referee: Mohammad Nawawi
19 August 2023
20:30 UTC+8

| Selangor MAC | 2–4 | Shah Alam City |
|---|---|---|
| Matheus Vasconcelos 9', 18' | Report | Aliff Roslan 10'; Well Pereira 26', 34'; Alireza Bohlouli 32' |

Panasonic National Sport Complex, Shah Alam
Attendance: 350
Referee: Faiz Jamaluddin

Selangor MAC won 8–7 on aggregate.

19 August 2023
20:30 UTC+8

| KL City | 1–3 | Johor Darul Ta'zim |
|---|---|---|
| Reshan Kumar 24' | Report | Caio Cesar 2'; Azri Rahman 3'; Abu Haniffa Hasan 8' |

ISN Raja Muda Sport Complex, Kuala Lumpur
Attendance: 160
Referee: Zulhilmi Haikal
19 August 2023
20:30 UTC+8

| Johor Darul Ta'zim | 3–3 | KL City |
|---|---|---|
| Danial Dain 5'; Azri Rahman 31'; Firdaus Ambiah 40' | Report | Anzar 27'; Amirul Khairuddin 30', 38' |

Pasir Gudang Indoor Stadium, Pasir Gudang
Attendance: 150
Referee: Mohd Syahrizal

Johor Darul Ta'zim won 6–4 on aggregate.

== Semi-finals ==
=== Summary ===
The first leg will be played on 27 & 28 August 2023 and the second leg will be played on 2 September 2023.

| Team 1 | Agg. | Team 2 | 1st leg | 2nd leg |
|---|---|---|---|---|
| Pahang Rangers | 14–3 | Terengganu | 7–0 | 7–3 |
| Selangor MAC | 3–8 | Johor Darul Ta'zim | 0–3 | 3–5 |

=== Matches ===
27 August 2023
20:30 UTC+8

| Pahang Rangers | 7–0 | Terengganu |
|---|---|---|
| Amin Nasrollah 2', 13', 36'; Hamdin Zarif 3'; Alif Mat Amin 9'; Saiful Nizam 32'; Sufri Shamil 39' | Report |

SUKPA Indoor Stadium, Kuantan
Attendance: 1851
Referee: Syahir Nizam
2 September 2023
21:00 UTC+8

| Terengganu | 3–7 | Pahang Rangers |
|---|---|---|
| Hafizi Ismail 39'; Alif Izzat Rosdi 22'; Fitrah Mohamad 27' | Report | Ridzwan Bakri 5', 6', 14'; Khaiyum Khaimi 9'; Akmarulnizam Idris 13'; Hamdin Zarif 38'; Mahadir Harahap 39' |

Kuala Terengganu State Stadium, Kuala Terengganu
Attendance: 100
Referee: Fazleem Rosli

Pahang Rangers won 14–3 on aggregate.

28 August 2023
20:30 UTC+8

| Selangor MAC | 0–3 | Johor Darul Ta'zim |
|---|---|---|
| | Report | Awalluddin Mat Nawi 17'; Abu Haniffa Hasan 33'; Firdaus Ambiah 40' |

Panasonic National Sport Complex, Shah Alam
Attendance: 824
Referee: Norafendy Norhayalan
2 September 2023
21:00 UTC+8

| Johor Darul Ta'zim | 5–3 | Selangor MAC |
|---|---|---|
| Firdaus Ambiah 11'; Syed Aizad Daniel 11' (o.g.); Caio Cesar 16', 29'; Abu Haniffa Hasan 38' | Report | Matheus Vasconcelos 13'; Takeshi Higuchi 23'; Faris Johan 35' |

Pasir Gudang Indoor Stadium, Pasir Gudang
Attendance: 300
Referee: Amirul Aizat

Johor Darul Ta'zim won 8–3 on aggregate.

== Third place play-off ==
=== Summary ===
The third place play-off will be played at the Malawati Stadium in Shah Alam, Selangor on 10 September 2023.

| Team 1 | Score | Team 2 |
|---|---|---|
| Terengganu | 2–7 | Selangor MAC |

=== Match ===
10 September 2023
16:00 UTC+8

| Terengganu | 2–7 | Selangor MAC |
|---|---|---|
| Nontawata Rakpitawong 19'; Shafiq Afnan 39' | Report | Fariq Mohammad 6'; Faris Johan 33'; Matheus Vasconcelos 36'; Syahir Iqbal 36'; Khairul Effendy 37', 38'; Takeshi Higuchi 37' |

Malawati Stadium, Shah Alam
Attendance: 100
Referee: Faiz Jamaluddin

== Final ==
=== Summary ===
The final will be played at the Malawati Stadium in Shah Alam, Selangor on 10 September 2023.

| Team 1 | Score | Team 2 |
|---|---|---|
| Pahang Rangers | 4–4 (3–1 p) | Johor Darul Ta'zim |

=== Match ===
10 September 2023
20:30 UTC+8

| Pahang Rangers | 4–4 | Johor Darul Ta'zim |
|---|---|---|
| Ridzwan Bakri 17', 39'; Saad Sani 36' (o.g.); Sergio Jamur 42' | Report | Ekmal Shahrin 2', 23'; Azwann Ismail 36'; Awalluddin Mat Nawi 43' |
Penalties
| Sergio Jamur (penalty scored); Amin Nasrollah (penalty missed); Akmarulnizam (penalty scored); Harith Na'im (penalty scored) | 3–1 | Firdaus Ambiah (penalty missed); Tanatul Thadavirot (penalty scored); Saad Sani (penalty missed); Azwann Ismail (penalty missed) |

Malawati Stadium, Shah Alam
Attendance: 3300
Referee: Faiz Jamaluddin

== Statistics ==
Statistics exclude qualifying round.

=== Top goalscorers ===
| Rank | Player | Team | Goals |
|---|---|---|---|
| 1 | (Iran) Amin Nasrollah | Pahang Rangers | 5 |
| 1 | (Malaysia) Ridzwan Bakri | Pahang Rangers | 5 |
| 2 | (Brazil) Sérgio Jamur | Pahang Rangers | 4 |
| 2 | (Brazil) Matheus Vasconcelos | Selangor MAC | 4 |
| 2 | (Malaysia) Faris Johan | Selangor MAC | 4 |
| 2 | (Brazil) Well Pereira | Shah Alam City | 4 |
| 2 | (Thailand) Supakorn Sangom | Terengganu | 4 |
| 7 | (Malaysia) Abu Haniffa Hasan | Johor Darul Ta'zim | 3 |
| 7 | (Brazil) Caio César | Johor Darul Ta'zim | 3 |
| 7 | (Malaysia) Firdaus Ambiah | Johor Darul Ta'zim | 3 |
| 7 | (Indonesia) Guntur Sulistyo | Selangor TOT United | 3 |
| 7 | (Malaysia) Wan Abdul Raziq | Selangor TOT United | 3 |
