= Ramelau Futsal Clube =

East Timorese futsal club

Ramelau
- Full name: Ramelau Futsal Clube
- Short name: RFC
- Founded: 2016; 10 years ago
- Ground: Sao Francisco Futsal Field; Dili, East Timor
- President: Borja Patrocinio Antonino
- Coach: Nelcen Escurial
- League: Liga Futsal Timor-Leste
- 2023: LFTL, 2nd

Ramelau Futsal Clube is an East Timorese futsal club based in Dili City, East Timor. Is a FUTSAL club of the FUTSAL Club that has existed in Timor-Leste since 2016 and has been recognized by the Futsal Association of Timor-Leste (AFTL) as an official club that can participate in professional and national level tournaments in Timor-Leste. Since its existence, RAMELAU FC has brought together young people with great potential in the sport of futsal, giving them space and opportunity to show their talents, improve their performance and contribute to the development of futsal in Timor-Leste..

== Achievements ==
=== Domestic competitions ===
Liga Futsal Timor-Leste

- Champion: 2025
- 2nd Place: 2023

Taca AFAMA - FEMINIMA F-FDTL

- Champion: 2022

Pra Liga Futsal Timor-Leste

- Champion: 2020–21

Taça 30 de Agosto

- Champion: 2016

Taça F-FDTL

- Runner-up: 2017

=== International competitions ===
AFF Futsal Cup

- Group stage: 2022

== Appearances in International Competitions ==
=== 2022 AFF Futsal Cup ===
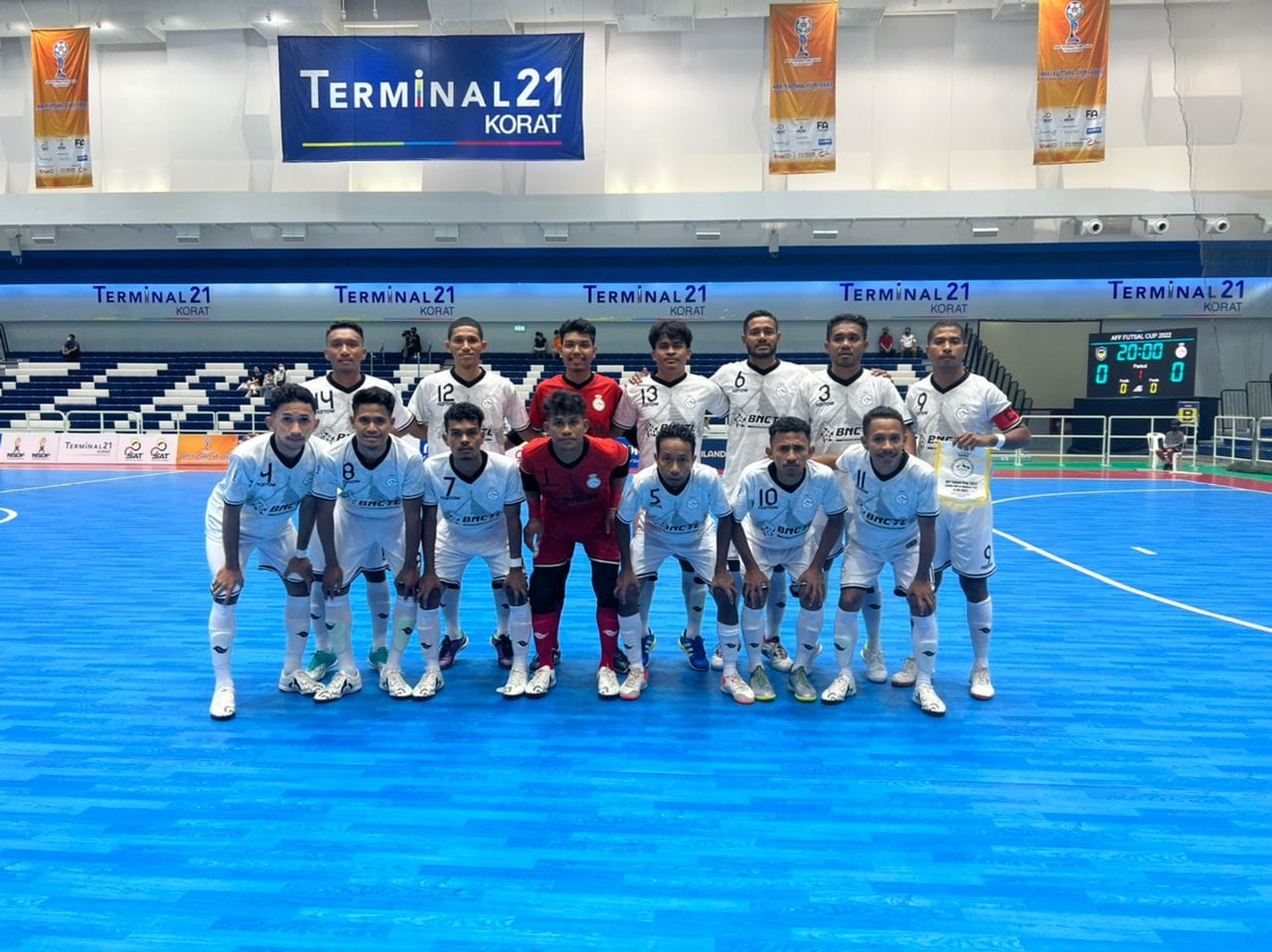
Ramelau Futsal Clube at AFF FUTSAL CUP 2022

Ramelau made his debut in the AFF competition in the 2022 season. Joined in Group B with Sahako from Vietnam, and Selangor MAC from Malaysia. In his first match on 4 September 2022 which was held at Terminal 21 Korat in Nakhon Ratchasima, Ramelau was defeated by Sahako with a score of 2–0. Then in their second match against Selangor MAC on 5 September 2022, Ramelau lost 0–6.

Here are the results of Ramelau matches in 2022 AFC Futsal Cup;

4 September 2022
12:00

(Vietnam) Sahako	2–0	(Timor-Leste) Ramelau
Dương Ngọc Linh 28'; Ngô Ngọc Sơn 35'	Report

Terminal 21 Karot, Nakhon Ratchasima

5 September 2022
12:00

(Timor-Leste) Ramelau	0–6	(Malaysia) Selangor MAC
	Report	Fariq 3'; Iqbal 15'; Silva 17' (pen.), 18'; Effendy 23'; Danial 33'

Terminal 21 Karot, Nakhon Ratchasima

== Players ==
=== Current squad ===
As of 15 July 2025.

Jersey number	Position	Name	Photo	Nationality	Age
24	Goalkeeper	Domingos dos Santos Gama		(Timor-Leste)	24
55	Goalkeeper	Pedro Maia de Carvalho		(Timor-Leste)	21
29	Goalkeeper	Carlos Manuel da Silva		(Timor-Leste)	21
27	Goalkeeper	Luis Novelio G. Soares		(Timor-Leste)	19
15	Fixed	Evanio de Jesus C.M. Celastino		(Timor-Leste)	
28	Fixed	Expedito de Araujo		(Timor-Leste)	25
4	Fixed	Rivaldo Faria Ribeiro		(Timor-Leste)	24
8	Fixed	Natalizio Imanuel Sang		(Timor-Leste)	27
20	Fixed	Bernabe da C. Soares		(Timor-Leste)	27
19	Winger	Joel Baptista Canizio Fernandes		(Timor-Leste)	24
17	Winger	Luis Francisco Fereira		(Timor-Leste)	24
21	Winger	Jose Rodrigues da Costa		(Timor-Leste)	28
30	Winger	Joao Paul Canizio Fernandes		(Timor-Leste)	24
7	Winger	Joao Caetano de Sousa Guterres		(Timor-Leste)	20
23	Winger	Inocencio Espirito Santo Leite		(Timor-Leste)	23
18	Winger	Zonzinho N. M. V. B. Boerman		(Timor-Leste)	20
25	Pivot	Benny Francisco G. M. Ribeiro		(Timor-Leste)	25
6	Pivot	Romulo Escurial		(Timor-Leste)	30
11	Pivot	Evinho M.B.A. do Rego Guterres		(Timor-Leste)	25

== Sponsorship ==
The following are Ramelau sponsors from the 2016 to 2025 seasons;

Year	Apparel	Sponsors
2016–19	Narrow	Golden Sands
2020–21	Narrow, Elastico	Jenic Entrepise, KINOS, R2M IT Solution, Vanna Sereno
2022-2023	Narrow, Elastico	BNCTL, MATO, King Construction
2025	Meja Redonda	Jenic Entrepise, Dapurt Timor, Caiulu Group,Maxxis, Alokanesi, Jocafasso, Always, Nano
