= 2022 Malaysia Premier Futsal League =

Malaysia Premier Futsal League
- Season: 2022
- All statistics correct as of 9 February 2022.

2022 Malaysia Premier Futsal League was the 2nd completed season of the Malaysia Premier Futsal League. It is the Malaysian professional futsal league for association football clubs, since its establishment in 2004. Selangor are the defending champions.

== Team changes ==
=== New teams ===
- Kelantan
- Negeri Sembilan
- KPM-PST Mustangs
- Shah Alam City
- Selangor TOT United

=== Withdrawn teams ===
- Sarawak FA

== Teams ==
For 2022 season, a total of 15 clubs compete in league.

Clubs	Location	Venue
ATM FA	Shah Alam	Panasonic Sport Complex
Kedah FA	Shah Alam	Panasonic Sport Complex
KL City	Shah Alam	Panasonic Sport Complex
KPM-PST Mustangs	Shah Alam	Panasonic Sport Complex
Kuala Lumpur FA	Shah Alam	Panasonic Sport Complex
Negeri Sembilan FA	Shah Alam	Panasonic Sport Complex
Pahang Rangers	Shah Alam	Panasonic Sport Complex
PDRM	Shah Alam	Panasonic Sport Complex
Perak FA	Shah Alam	Panasonic Sport Complex
Penang FA	Shah Alam	Panasonic Sport Complex
Selangor MAC	Shah Alam	Panasonic Sport Complex
Selangor TOT United	Shah Alam	Panasonic Sport Complex
Shah Alam City	Shah Alam	Panasonic Sport Complex
Terengganu	Shah Alam	Panasonic Sport Complex
Kelantan	Shah Alam	Panasonic Sport Complex

== League table ==
Pos	Team	Pld	W	D	L	GF	GA	GD	Pts	Qualification or relegation
1	Selangor MAC (C)	14	12	1	1	66	32	+34	37	Qualification for AFF Futsal Club Championship & 2022 CUCKOO Malaysia Futsal Cup
2	Pahang Rangers	14	10	3	1	56	18	+38	33	Qualification to the 2022 CUCKOO Malaysia Futsal Cup
3	Negeri Sembilan	14	9	2	3	48	26	+22	29	Qualification to the 2022 CUCKOO Malaysia Futsal Cup
4	Penang	14	8	2	4	54	47	+7	26	Qualification to the 2022 CUCKOO Malaysia Futsal Cup
5	PDRM	14	7	2	5	54	40	+14	23	Qualification to the 2022 CUCKOO Malaysia Futsal Cup
6	Selangor TOT United	14	6	2	6	45	36	+9	20	Qualification to the 2022 CUCKOO Malaysia Futsal Cup
7	Terengganu	14	6	2	6	44	40	+4	20	Qualification to the 2022 CUCKOO Malaysia Futsal Cup
8	Shah Alam City	14	6	2	6	35	37	−2	20	Qualification to the 2022 CUCKOO Malaysia Futsal Cup
9	KPM-PST Mustangs	14	6	1	7	39	36	+3	19	
10	Kedah	14	5	4	5	43	46	−3	19	
11	Kelantan	14	5	3	6	41	42	−1	18	Withdrawn Next Season
12	KL City	14	5	3	6	37	40	−3	18	
13	ATM FA	14	3	0	11	43	71	−28	9	
14	Kuala Lumpur	14	2	0	12	28	77	−49	6	
15	Perak	14	1	1	12	30	75	−45	4	Withdrawn Next Season

Updated to match(es) played on 13 March 2022. Source: FAM
Rules for classification: 1) Points; 2) Goal difference; 3) Number of goals scored.
(C) Champions

== Result table ==
Home \ Away	PAH	TER	KEL	KLU	NSE	SEL	PRK	KLC	PEN	MUS	KED	SHA	TOT	POL	ATM
Pahang Rangers	—	4–1		8–1				2–2	4–1	1–0			3–2		7–1
Terengganu		—	4–2		0–6				0–1	7–2	2–1		4–5		
Kelantan	1–4		—	4–1		3–5	5–2					2–3			5–3
Kuala Lumpur				—	1–8			1–6	3–6	2–8			1–3		6–3
Negeri Sembilan	1–1		2–2		—	3–2	2–1				1–2	1–4		2–0	
Selangor MAC		4–2		7–3		—	6–4	5–3					3–2		8–1
Perak	1–8	2–7		1–4			—	2–5	1–6				2–6		3–6
KL City		4–3			2–7			—	3–6	1–3			3–2	2–3	3–2
Penang			2–5		3–2	2–5			—		5–5	7–5		3–5	
KPM-PST Mustangs					2–3	3–5	5–5			—	6–2	0–1		3–1	
Kedah	1–3		3–3	3–1		2–9	3–4	2–2			—	6–2			
Shah Alam City	0–6	1–1					6–1	1–0				—			4–6
Selangor TOT United			3–5						2–2	4–2	2–4	0–0	—	2–1	
PDRM	4–3			9–2		2–4	6–1				4–4	6–3		—	
ATM FA		4–5							5–7	1–2			1–8	6–3	—

Updated to match(es) played on 16 February 2022. Source: FAM
Legend: Blue = home team win; Yellow = draw; Red = away team win.
For upcoming matches, an "a" indicates there is an article about the rivalry between the two participants.
