= Siamese invasion of Patani (1786) =

- Part of Siamese Expansion in the Early Rattanakosin Era
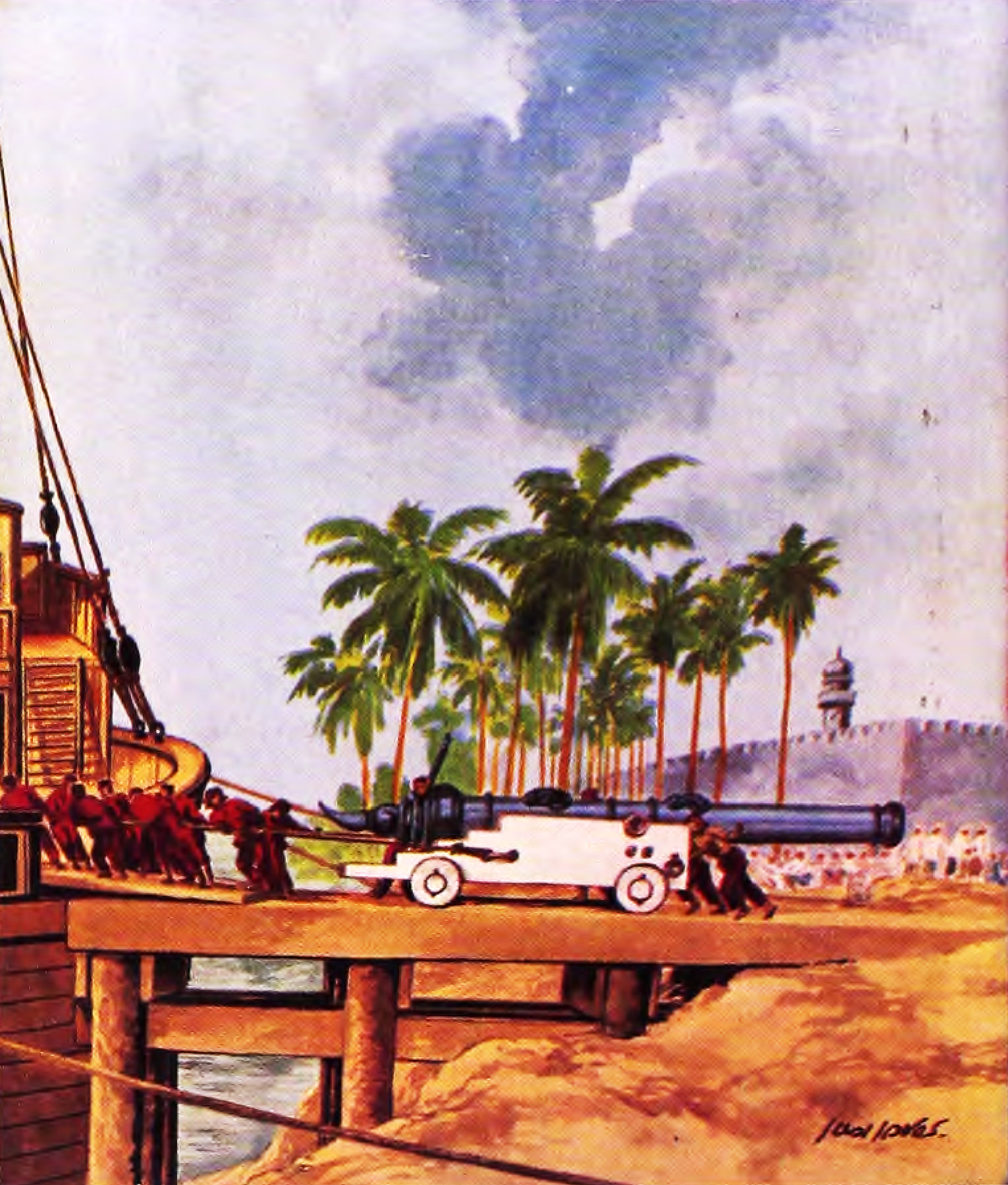
Date	1786
Location	Patani Sultanate (modern Patani, Thailand)
Result	Siamese victory: Siam successfully captured the city of Patani; The Sultanate of Patani was re-established as a Siamese vassal state; Siam seized the “Seri Patani” cannon and brought it back to Bangkok

Belligerents
Rattanakosin Kingdom	Patani Kingdom

Commanders and leaders
Rama I (King Phutthayotfa Chulalok)	Sultan Muhammad †

Strength
Unknown	Unknown

Casualties and losses
Unknown	Very heavy, at least patani 4,000 captured 2 cannon captured

The Siamese invasion of Patani occurred as part of the expansion and unification of the Siamese kingdom during the reign of King Buddha Yodfa Chulalok the Great (Rama I) of the Rattanakosin period Siam led an army to attack Pattani until it was defeated, with Prince Maha Sura Singhanat as the commander. Pattani lost its independence at this time. Siamese soldiers burned the palace and houses, including seizing two important cannons, namely Seri Negeri and Seri Patani, And around 4,000 people from Pattani who were taken prisoner of war boarded ships bound for Bangkok.

== Invasions ==
when the Siamese forced the Patani people to pay taxes they refused. So In 1786 the Siamese forces initiated the sieges on Patani strongest fort, after an 4 years sieges the Patani was exhausted and defeated by Siamese forces.
