= Lim Ko Niao =

Deity of Chinese people in southern Thailand

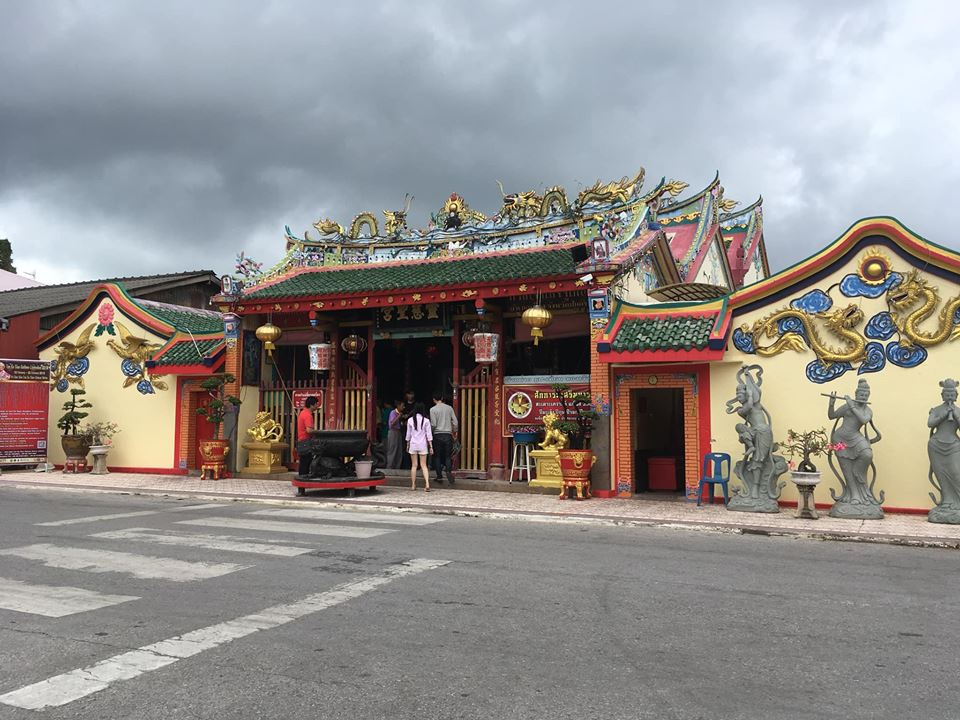
Leng Chu Kiang shrine in Pattani where Lim Ko Niao is worshipped

Lim Ko Niao (Chinese: 林姑娘; Pe̍h-ōe-jī: lîm-ko-niû; lit. 'Maiden Lin'), Thai: ลิ้มกอเหนี่ยว), alternatively Lin Guniang or Lim Kor Niaw and also named Lim Kun Yew, is a deity worshipped by Chinese people in southern Thailand. She was said to be the sister of Lim Toh Khiam, and who according to legend committed suicide after she failed to persuade her brother to return home. She then began to be worshipped as a goddess by the ethnic Chinese communities in southern Thailand for her sense of filial piety and patriotic feeling for China. A shrine, the Leng Chu Kiang shrine, and a museum dedicated to her exist in Pattani.

== Legend ==
Lim Ko Niao is said to be the sister of Lim Toh Khiam, a Ming dynasty Chinese pirate (described as a merchant in local tales) who settled in the Patani Kingdom in the 16th century. Her existence as an actual person is not known, and her given name is not clear (Ko Niao or Guniang means "maiden" or "young woman"); some sources say her given name was Cizhen (慈貞), but a separate tale involving Lim Toh Khiam from Taiwan tells of a sister named Jinlian (金蓮). She is also named in some sources as Lim Kun Yew, a sea goddess worshipped in some Chinese communities.

According to the Patani legend, Lim Ko Niao went looking for Lim Toh Khiam when their mother became ill, swearing not to return until she had brought him back. She found Lim Toh Khiam in Patani, where he had married the daughter of the Sultan, converted to Islam and was building a mosque for the Queen. However, he refused to return and fought her instead. She lost, and she committed suicide by hanging from a janggus (cashew) tree. Before she died, she was said to have cursed the mosque her brother was building, believed to be the Krue Se Mosque, so that it could never be completed – every time someone tried to finish the building, a lightning would strike the building. In mourning, the local Chinese later made of statue of her with wood from the tree she had hung herself, and created a small shrine for her, and worshipped her for her sense of filial piety and patriotism. Another legend says that she committed suicide after fighting alongside her brother against rebels in Patani and became surrounded by them.

Her gravestone, said to have been built by her brother and located next to the Krue Se Mosque, is dated 1574 but may actually have been created in the early 20th century. It is believed that she was originally buried near the harbour which has since become inundated by the sea, and the tomb was then moved next to the Krue Se Mosque around 1919.

== Worship ==
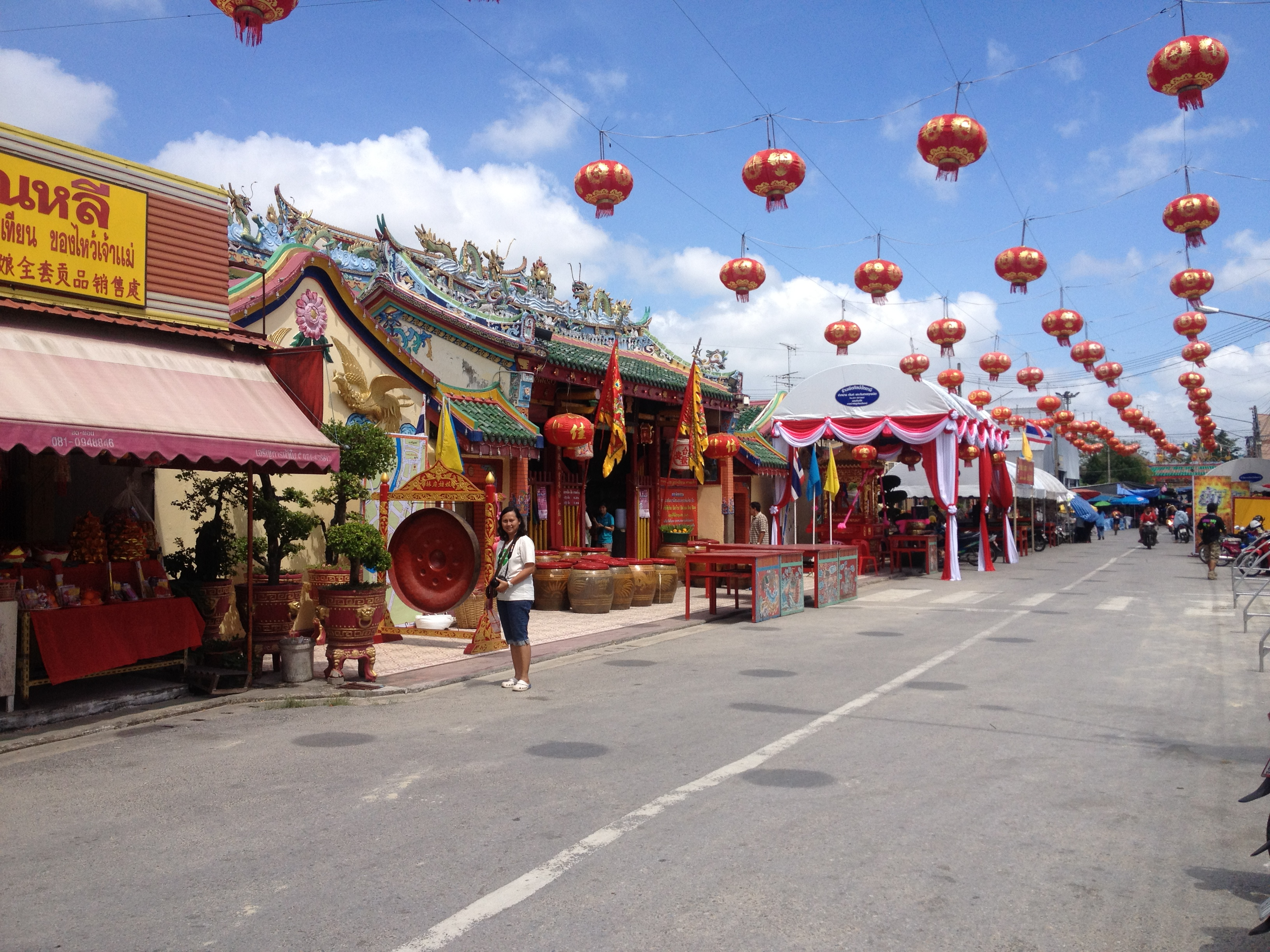
Shrine in readiness for the Chao Mae Lim Ko Niao Festival

The image of Lim Ko Niao was originally placed in small shrine, To Pikong Me, near the Krue Se Mosque. The image was then moved to Leng Chu Kiang (Chinese: 靈慈宮; Pe̍h-ōe-jī: Lêng-Chû-kiong). This temple was originally named Zushigong Shrine (祖師公祠) dedicated to Master Qingshui – it was mentioned in Chinese temple record that such a temple existed in Kuala Bekah, Patani in 1547, the oldest-known temple dedicated to Master Qingshui in Southeast Asia. It is said that a Chinese leader named Luang Cheen Kananurak refurbished the temple and moved the carved image of Lim Ko Niao here in 1879, The temple was renamed Leng Chu Kiang after the image of Lim Ko Niao was moved there, and it is now commonly referred to as the Chao Mae Lim Ko Niao Shrine. Lim Ko Niao has association with pearls, and the figurine is therefore decorated with pearl necklaces, and worshippers may also wear strings of pearls. A number of other deities also worshipped in the temple, such as Mazu and Fude Zhengshen. The temple was partly rebuilt in 1912 and in 1969.

Other shrines dedicated to Lim Ko Niao have also been established in the neighbouring provinces of Songkhla and Yala, and her worship has spread further to a few towns in Central and Upper South Thailand. The worship of Lim To Niao may have started to spread outside of the Patani area in the 1950s, and the Patani shrine has become a tourist attraction for visitors from Malaysia and Singapore since the 1960s.

=== Festival ===
A festival, the Chao Mae Lim Ko Niao Festival (Thai: งานสมโภชเจ้าแม่ลิ้มกอเหนี่ยว), is held every year in Pattani, starting on the 14th day of the Chinese New Year. The following day on the 15th, the wooden image of Lim Ko Niao and 17 other statues of various deities worshipped at this temple as well as others from the neighbourhood are carried by the locals in a grand procession. The images are carried by devotees across the Pattani River for bathing in the water at Dechanuchit Bridge, and the carriers of the images also walked over fire at the courtyard in front of the temple.
