= Siamese–Patani War (1634) =

Seven day war in Southern Thailand

Ayutthaya-Patani War (1634)
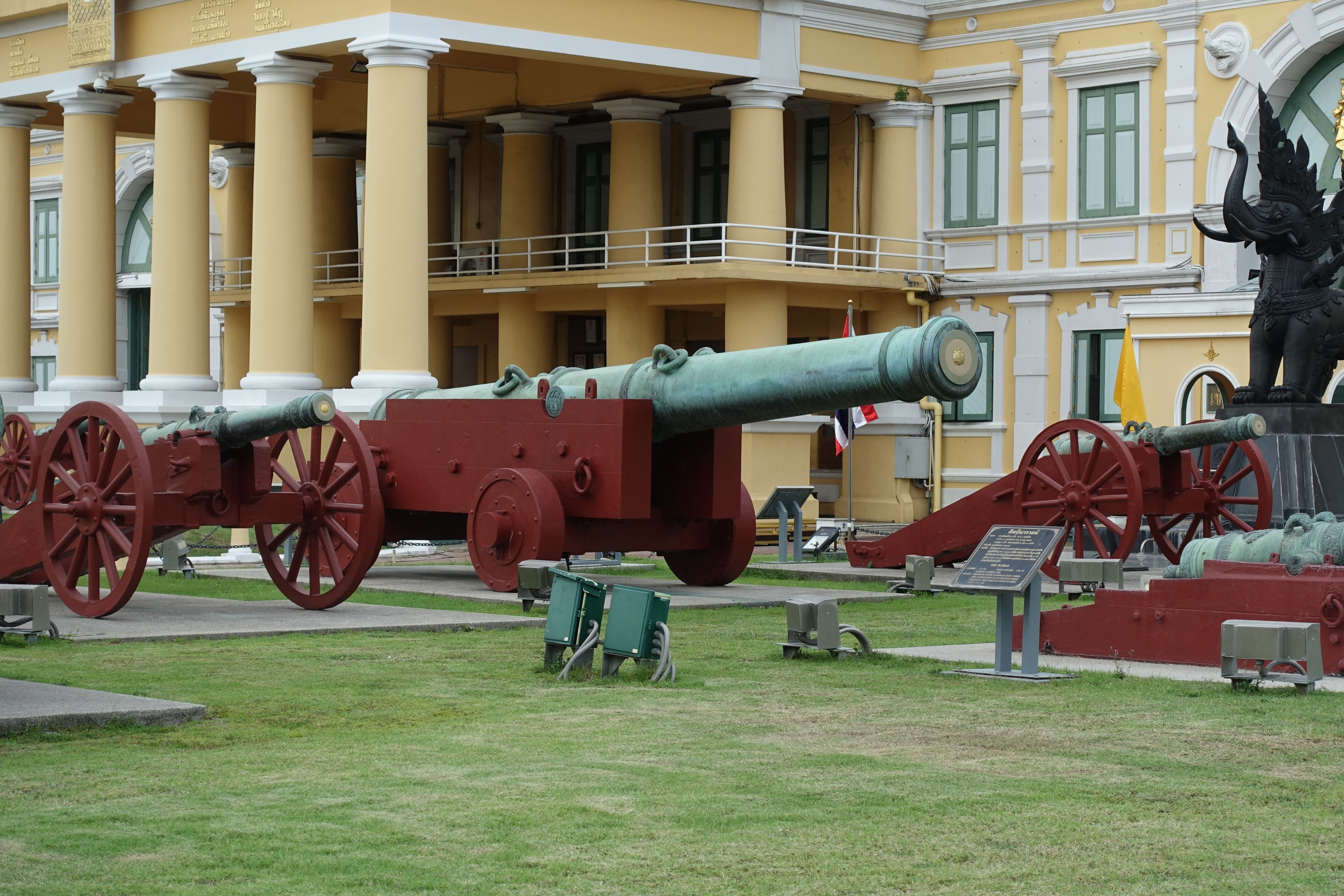
- The Phaya Tani, in front of the Ministry of Defence (2023)
Date	11 May 1634
Location	Pattani, Southern Thailand
Result	Patani victory; Withdrawal Siamese forces from Pattani

Belligerents
Patani Kingdom; Portuguese Empire; Supported by: Sultanate of Johor; Sultanate of Pahang	Ayutthaya Kingdom; Supported by: Dutch East India Company

Units involved
Raja Ungu (Portuguese Empire) Álvaro de Castro	Prasat Thong

Strength
(Unknown Personal); 50 ship from Johor and Pahang; 4 galleys from Portuguese	60,000 Men

The Siamese–Patani War (Thai: สงครามสยาม-ปัตตานี พ.ศ.2177) was fought in 1634 between the Patani Kingdom and Ayutthaya Kingdom. King Prasat Thong came to power in Ayutthaya through a coup d'état which Raja Ungu of Patani refused to accept and cut off relations with Ayutthaya and stopped sending bunga mas. This caused Prasat Thong to gather an army of 30,000 men and more than 60,000 from various cities on 11 May 1634, with the Dutch promising to send warships to support him. The war lasted seven days. Ayutthaya was unable to attack Pattani as it received assistance from Johor and Pahang, totalling 50 ships, along with four Portuguese warships that came to support. When supplies ran low, the Ayutthaya forces retreated to Songkhla to wait for support from the Dutch, but there was no sign of it and the army eventually retreated.
