= Ligor–Patani War (1629–1630) =

- Part of Siamese–Patani conflicts
Date	1629–1630
Location	Patani (Pattani) and surrounding areas
Result	Patani victory: Over 10,000 prisoner massacred

Belligerents
Patani Kingdom	Ayutthaya Kingdom; Kingdom of Ligor

Commanders and leaders
Raja Ungu	Songtham; Yamada Nagamasa (WIA)

Strength
Unknown	Unknown

Casualties and losses
Unknown	Unknown (Yamada Nagamasa was severely wounded and later assassinated by poisoning)
- This conflict secured Patani's independence for a period and led to the demise of the influential Japanese contingent in Siam.

The Ligor–Patani War (1629–1630) was part of the long-standing conflict between the Ayutthaya Kingdom (Siam) and the strong port city of Patani, which sought independence. In 1629–1630, King Songtham of Ayutthaya dispatched an army led by Okya Senaphimuk (Yamada Nagamasa), an influential Japanese samurai in the Ayutthayan court, to suppress Patani. The campaign was primarily launched from the base in Nakhon Si Thammarat

== Key outcomes ==
Yamada Nagamasa forces were defeated by Patani, led by Raja Ungu (the queen of Patani at the time). Yamada Nagamasa was severely wounded during the fighting. Upon returning to Nakhon Si Thammarat for recovery, he was poisoned, leading to his death. This event marked the end of significant Japanese influence in Southern Siam and temporarily preserved Patani's independence before future conflicts.
