= 2022 AFF Futsal Cup =

Futsal tournament in south-east Asia

AFF Futsal Cup 2022
เอเอฟเอฟ ฟุตซอล คัพ 2022

Tournament details
- Host country: Thailand
- City: Nakhon Ratchasima
- Dates: 4–10 September
- Teams: 7 (from 1 sub-confederation)
- Venue(s): 1 (in 1 host city)

Final positions
- Champions: (Indonesia) Bintang Timur Surabaya
- Runners-up: (Thailand) Hongyen Thakam
- Third place: (Malaysia) Selangor MAC
- Fourth place: (Vietnam) Sahako

Tournament statistics
- Matches played: 13
- Goals scored: 111 (8.54 per match)
- Top scorer(s): (Indonesia) Andri Kustiawan (Indonesia) Samuel Eko (9 goals)
- Best player(s): (Paraguay) Neto Veiga

The 2022 AFF Futsal Cup was the seventh edition of AFF Futsal Cup. The tournament was held in Nakhon Ratchasima, Thailand from 4 to 10 September 2022.

== Participants ==
team	headquarters
(Thailand) Hongyen Thakam (host)	Samut Songkhram
(Indonesia) Bintang Timur Surabaya	Surabaya
(Cambodia) Down Town Sport	Phnom Penh
(Brunei) MS ABDB Perwira	Bandar Seri Begawan
(Timor-Leste) Ramelau	Dili
(Vietnam) Sahako	Hồ Chí Minh
(Malaysia) Selangor MAC	Selangor

== Group stage ==
=== Group A ===
Pos	Team	Pld	W	D	L	GF	GA	GD	Pts	Result
1	(Thailand) Hongyen Thakam (H)	3	3	0	0	28	6	+22	9	advance to Knockout stage
2	(Indonesia) Bintang Timur Surabaya	3	2	0	1	33	7	+26	6	advance to Knockout stage
3	(Cambodia) Down Town Sport	3	1	0	2	12	27	−15	3	
4	(Brunei) MS ABDB Perwira	3	0	0	3	6	39	−33	0	

Source: AFF
(H) Hosts

=== Match ===
4 September 2022
14:30

(Cambodia) Down Town Sport	2–12	(Indonesia) Bintang Timur Surabaya
Chanmony 17'; Sachakboth 21'	Report	Kustiawan 4', 5', 20'; Pangestu 6', 27'; Rasyid 7'; Lubis 12'; Eko 16', 31'; Chandra 23'; Iqbal 26'; Runtuboy 38'

Terminal 21 Karot, Nakhon Ratchasima
4 September 2022
17:00

(Thailand) Hongyen Thakam	12–2	(Brunei) MS ABDB Perwira
Katawut 4'; Wittaya 6', 19', 34'; Pokawin 8'; Supot 10'; Keattisak 11', 39'; Mendes 15'; Veiga 16'; Ampol 29'; Siksaka 37'	Report	Zulkifli 22'; Adruman 29'

Terminal 21 Karot, Nakhon Ratchasima

5 September 2022
14:30

(Brunei) MS ABDB Perwira	4–8	(Cambodia) Down Town Sport
Norazlan 11', 35'; Yunus 20', 21'	Report	Sichamroeun 18', 22', 30'; Sochetra 19', 29'; Nareth 27'; Chanmony 39', 40'

Terminal 21 Karot, Nakhon Ratchasima
5 September 2022
17:00

(Indonesia) Bintang Timur Surabaya	2–5	(Thailand) Hongyen Thakam
Iqbal 22'; Kustiawan 40'	Report	Therdsak 11'; Mendes 14'; Charoen 30'; Pokawin 39'; Katawut 40'

Terminal 21 Karot, Nakhon Ratchasima

6 September 2022
14:30

(Indonesia) Bintang Timur Surabaya	19–0	(Brunei) MS ABDB Perwira
Runtuboy 5'; Kustiawan 8', 19', 26', 34'; Coelho 11', 16'; Eko 13', 20', 21', 22', 23', 24'; Saud 16'; Rasyid 22', 23', 24', 32'; Chandra 30'	Report

Terminal 21 Karot, Nakhon Ratchasima
6 September 2022
17:00

(Thailand) Hongyen Thakam	11–2	(Cambodia) Down Town Sport
Siksaka 9'; Amarin 12'; Keattisak 14'; Therdsak 27', 32'; Veiga 28'; Wittaya 33', 39'; Charoen 35', 36'; Supot 40'	Report	Pokawin 1' (o.g.); Sichamroeun 31'

Terminal 21 Karot, Nakhon Ratchasima

=== Group B ===
Pos	Team	Pld	W	D	L	GF	GA	GD	Pts	Result
1	(Vietnam) Sahako	2	2	0	0	4	1	+3	6	advance to Knockout stage
2	(Malaysia) Selangor MAC	2	1	0	1	7	2	+5	3	advance to Knockout stage
3	(Timor-Leste) Ramelau	2	0	0	2	0	8	−8	0	

Source: AFF

=== Match ===
4 September 2022
12:00

(Vietnam) Sahako	2–0	(Timor-Leste) Ramelau
Dương Ngọc Linh 28'; Ngô Ngọc Sơn 35'	Report

Terminal 21 Karot, Nakhon Ratchasima

5 September 2022
12:00

(Timor-Leste) Ramelau	0–6	(Malaysia) Selangor MAC
	Report	Fariq 3'; Iqbal 15'; Silva 17' (pen.), 18'; Effendy 23'; Danial 33'

Terminal 21 Karot, Nakhon Ratchasima

6 September 2022
12:00

(Malaysia) Selangor MAC	1–2	(Vietnam) Sahako
Ekmal 2'	Report	Dương Ngọc Linh 37'; Nguyễn Đắc Huy 40'

Terminal 21 Karot, Nakhon Ratchasima

== Knockout stage ==
Semi-final
08 September
(Thailand) Hongyen Thakam	6
(Malaysia) Selangor MAC	2
08 September
(Vietnam) Sahako	1
(Indonesia) Bintang Timur Surabaya	2

Final
10 September
(Thailand) Hongyen Thakam	2
(Indonesia) Bintang Timur Surabaya	4
Third Place
10 September
(Malaysia) Selangor MAC	2 (8)
(Vietnam) Sahako	2 (7)

=== Match ===
Semi-final

8 September 2022
14:00

(Vietnam) Sahako	1–2	(Indonesia) Bintang Timur Surabaya
Dương Ngọc Linh 27'	Report	Suhendra 6'; Coelho 7'

Terminal 21 Korat, Nakhon Ratchasima
8 September 2022
17:00

(Thailand) Hongyen Thakam	6–2	(Malaysia) Selangor MAC
Syawal 5' (o.g.); Veiga 13'; Supot 21'; Wittaya 22'; Mendes 29'; Amarin 32'	Report	Aizad 10'; Silva 21'

Terminal 21 Korat, Nakhon Ratchasima

Third place

10 September 2022
14:30

(Malaysia) Selangor MAC	2–2	(Vietnam) Sahako
Silva 12'; Effendy 29'	Report	Dinh Van Toan 5'; Dương Ngọc Linh 29'
Penalties
	8–7

Terminal 21 Korat, Nakhon Ratchasima

Final

10 September 2022
17:00

(Thailand) Hongyen Thakam	2–4	(Indonesia) Bintang Timur Surabaya
Ampol 18'; Keattisak 22'	Report	Eko 11'; Coelho 15', 36'; Kustiawan 30'

Terminal 21 Korat, Nakhon Ratchasima

== Winner ==
2022 AFF Futsal Cup Winner
(Indonesia)
Bintang Timur Surabaya
First title

== See also ==
- AFF Futsal Cup
