= Phaya Tani =

Historic weapon in Pattani Province, Thailand

Coordinates: 13°45′05.2″N 100°29′38.1″E

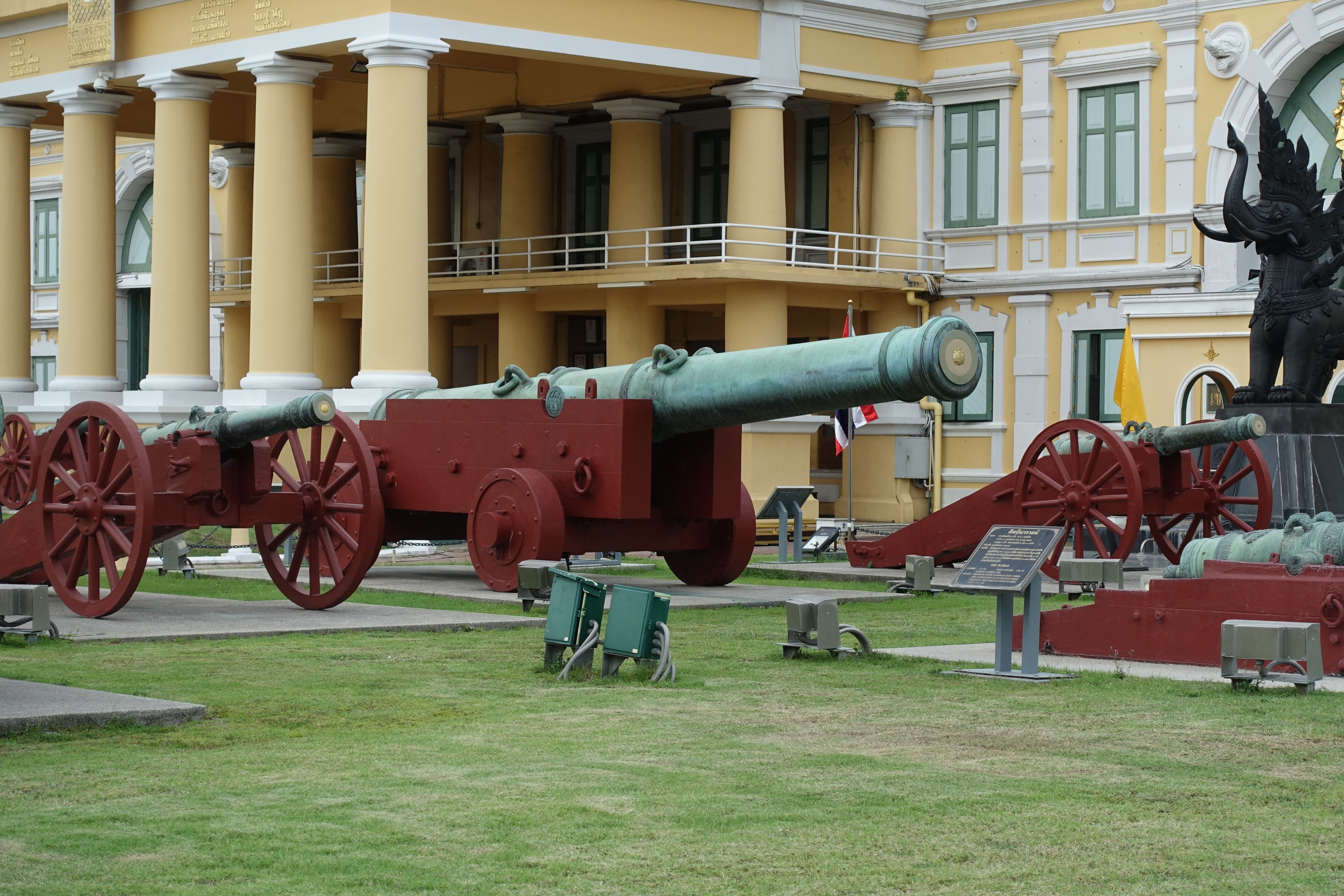
The Phaya Tani, in front of the Ministry of Defence (2023)

Phaya Tani (Thai: พญาตานี; also Nang Phraya Tani, or Seri Patani in Malay) is a 17th-century siege cannon from Pattani Province in southern Thailand. It is the largest cannon ever cast in what is now Thailand, measuring 2.7 m long (9 feet) and made of brass. It is on display in front of the Ministry of Defence, opposite the Grand Palace in Bangkok. The cannon still serves as the symbol of Pattani Province and it has been on the official seal of Pattani Province since 1939.

== History ==
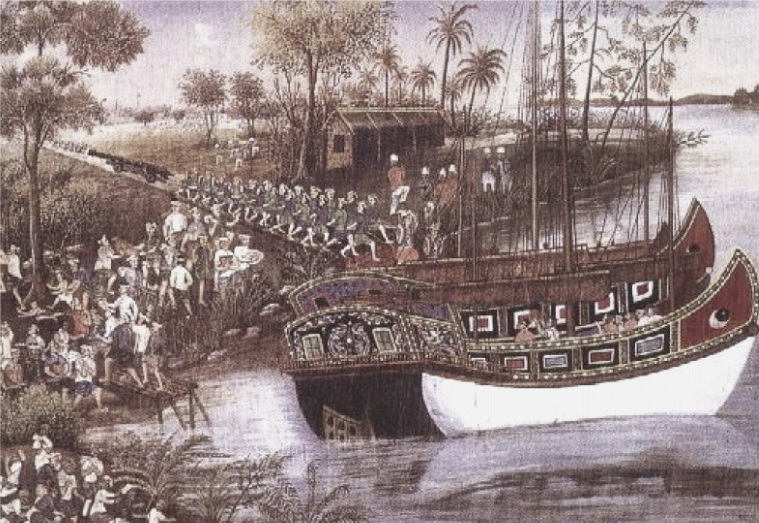
A painting of Siamese army take the cannon Phaya Tani to Bangkok in 1786, painted in 1887.

Various sources give differing accounts of how cannons came to be made in Pattani and who made them. According to Sejarah Kerajaan Melayu Patani ("History of the Malay Kingdom of Patani"), cannons were cast in the early-17th century in the Sultanate of Pattani by a man of Chinese descent named Tok Kayan. Raja Biru ordered the construction of powerful artillery to protect their independence from Siam. Three cannons were made – two siege guns named Seri Negara, Seri Patani, and a smaller cannon named the Maha Lela. Phongsawadan muang pattani ("Chronicle of Pattani") named the cannons as Cri Nagri, Nang Pattani, and Maha Lalo. Hikayat Patani, however, gives the name of these three cannons as Seri Negeri, Tuk (Datuk) Buk, and Nang (Lady) Liu-Liu. It suggests that the first cannon was cast earlier by a man from Rum (Istanbul) called Abdussamad, but it was too thin to be usable, only later through the powers (daulat) of Patani's first king were the three cannons cast. While it is unclear who created the cannons, a large cannon was known to have existed by the early 17th century in Patani; a Dutch report mentioned in 1602 that a cannon "bigger than any found in Amsterdam" was placed prominently near the port of Patani. The cannons were said to have successfully repelled a number of attacks.

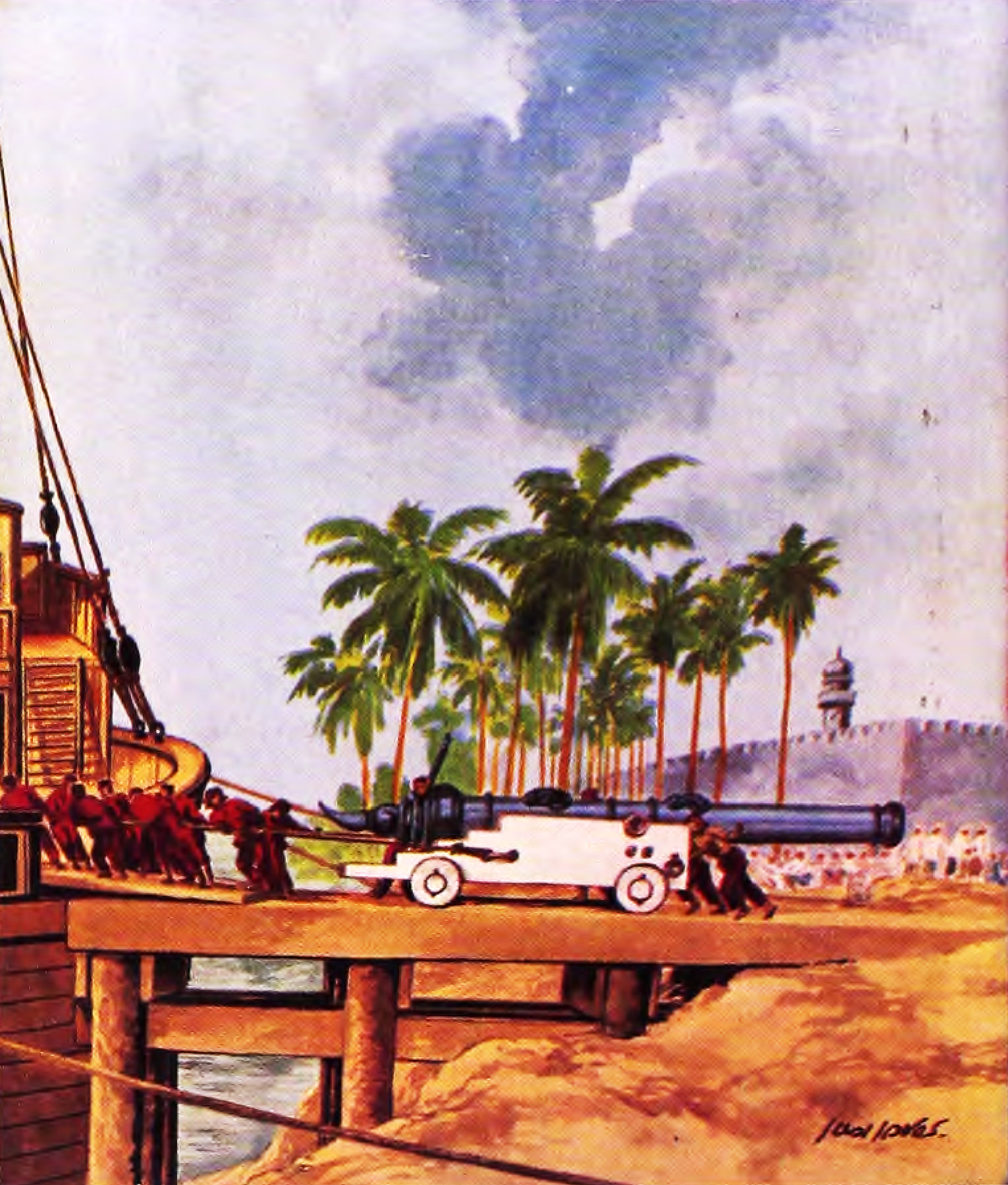
The taking of the cannon Phaya Tani to Bangkok, illustrated by Hem Vejakorn (c.1969).

After the fall of Ayutthaya to the Burmese in 1767, the Sultanate of Pattani renounced its tributary status to Siam and declared its independence. Eighteen years later in 1785, a Thai army led by King Rama I's brother, the vice-king Boworn Maha Surasinghanat, invaded and conquered Patani, and the Thais have ruled it ever since. The Phaya Patani (Seri Patani) and Phaya Negara (Seri Negara) were ordered to be sent to Bangkok as spoils of war. Some sources say that Phaya Negara came loose as it was being loaded aboard a ship and plunged into the sea, where it remains. Phaya Tani is believed to be originally named Nang Tani (Lady Patani) after the queen who ordered it made.

King Rama I ordered a similar-sized cannon named the Narai Sanghan (Thai: นารายณ์สังหาร) to be cast to serve as a companion to the Phaya Patani, now renamed the Phraya Tani.

A replica of Phaya Tani was created and placed in front of Krue Se Mosque in Pattani in 2013, but it was damaged by separatists who saw it as 'faked' and wanted the return of the original cannon.

== Cultural significance ==
The cannon has been used as a symbol of Pattani on the official seal of Pattani Province since 1939. It is also remembered in Pattani by the locals who fired bamboo cannons during the Hari Raya festival celebrations.

== Gallery ==
Cannon used on the flag of the Scouts of Monthon Pattani, 1915-1933.

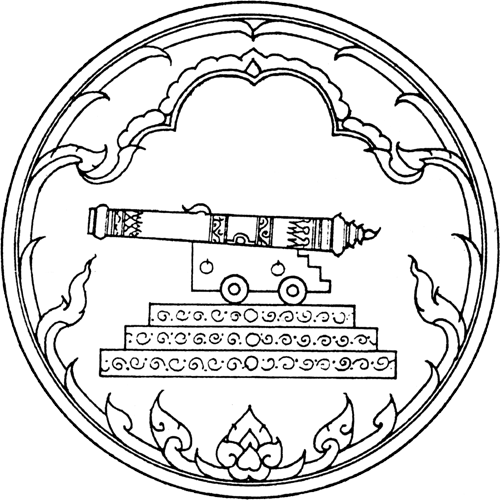
Cannon used on the seal of Pattani Province since 1941.

Cannon used on the flag of Pattani Province

== See also ==
- Queens of Langkasuka - a 2008 Thai historical fantasy adventure film set in the Pattani Kingdom about the quest for the sunken cannon.
