= Charoen =

- Pronunciation: Thai: [t͡ɕa.rɤːn]
- Gender: Male
- Language: Thai

Origin
- Origin: Khmer
- Meaning: prosper
- Region of origin: Thailand

Charoen (Thai: เจริญ, pronounced [t͡ɕā.rɤ̄ːn]) is a Thai word meaning "prosper". As a given name, it may refer to:

- Charoen Khanthawong (1933–2022), Thai Minister of Science and Technology
- Charoen Sirivadhanabhakdi (born 1944), Thai entrepreneur
- Charoen Suepsaeng (1902–1969), Thai politician
- Charoen Wattanasin (born 1937), former badminton player from Thailand
