= Lin Daoqian =

Ming-dynasty Teochew pirate

- 林道乾
- Born: 16th century Teoswa region, Guangdong, Ming China
- Died: 1580s ? Patani
- Occupation: Pirate

Lin Daoqian (Chinese: 林道乾; pinyin: Lín Dàoqián; Wade–Giles: Lin Tao-ch'ien; Pe̍h-ōe-jī: Lîm tō-khiân, Malay: Tok Kayan, Thai: ลิ้มโต๊ะเคี่ยม), also written as Lim Toh Khiam and Vintoquián, was a Chinese pirate of Teochew origin active in the 16th century. He led pirate attacks along the coast of Guangdong and Fujian, but they were driven away by the Ming navy forces in 1563. By 1567 he was again raiding the South China coast. He later moved to South East Asia, and settled in Patani where he established a significant presence. He died in Patani.

== Life ==
Lin was of Teochew origin, and he was described as being from either Chenghai or Huilai in Guangdong. Later he moved to Quanzhou, Fujian. Lin was part of the wokou piratical activity that plagued the Chinese coast during the reign of the Ming Jiajing Emperor (1522–1566). He attacked villages and Zhao'an with 50 ships in 1566, where he was said to have burnt hundreds of houses killing thousands. In response, the Ming navy led by Yu Dayou or Qi Jiguang drove Lin away, first to Penghu islands, later to Beigang, Taiwan. Yu occupied Penghu after driving Lin away, but did not pursue Lin to Taiwan. Lin may have operated in Taiwan on and off for many years. Lin was also believed to have moved to Champa and Luzon in the Philippines.

By 1567, Lin was again raiding along the coast of China, and in 1568, and the Ming authority placed a bounty on Lin in an attempt to capture him. The Ming authority also attempted to recruit Lin in their fight against the pirates, using Lin's fleet to attack other pirates in 1569. Lin was reported to have 5,000 followers by July 1569. Ming records, however, state that Lin was "most crafty and cunning", and would alternately rebel and swear allegiance to the Ming authority. It was reported in 1573 that he had rebelled, and fled to find sanctuary in a foreign country. At some point he was said to have been attacked by another pirate chief Lin Feng, who captured 55 of his ships. History of Ming suggests that Lin moved to Southeast Asia out of fear of other pirates. He settled in Pulo Condore in 1574.

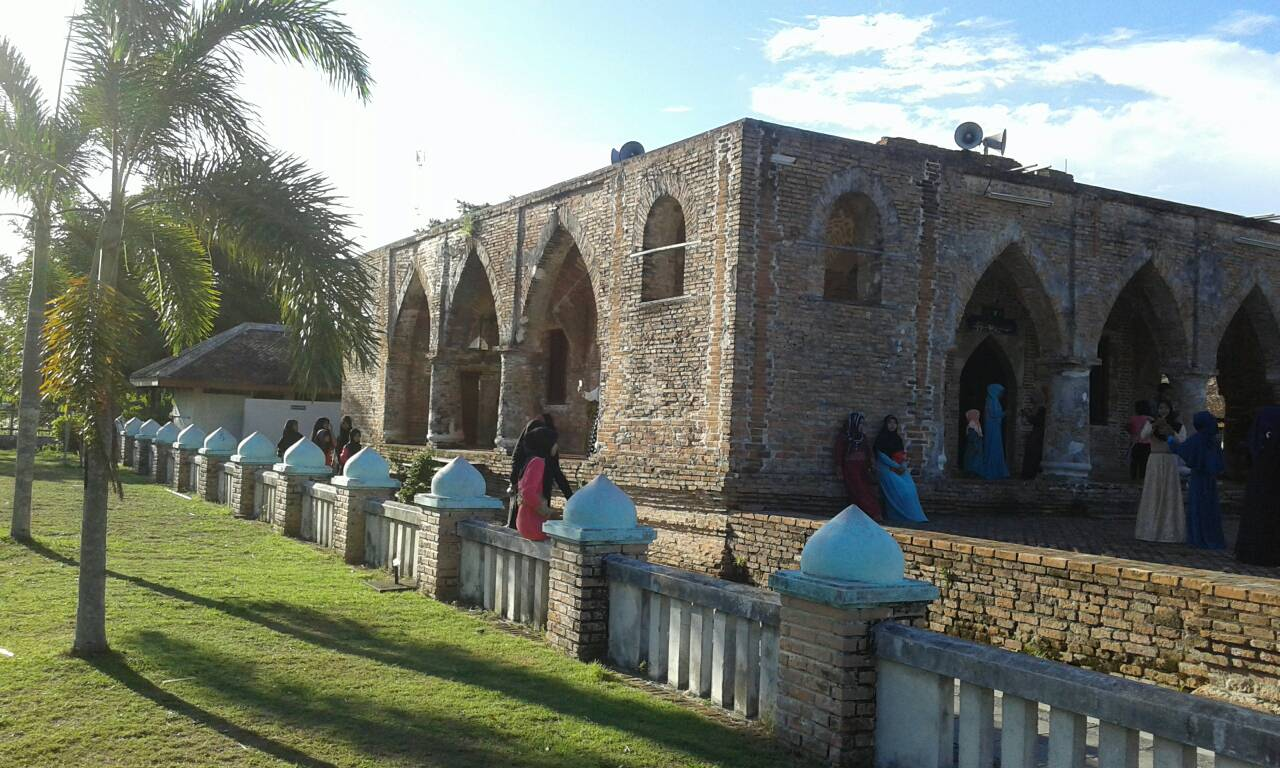
Krue Se Mosque in Patani, claimed in local lore to have been built by Lin Daoqian

By the first half of 1570s, Lin was already operating along the Siamese coast, and the Ming authority joined force with the Siamese navy as well as using Portuguese ships to combat the pirates. In 1578, he established a base in Patani with 2,000 followers, and they dominated the town for some time. Ming sources indicate that he attacked Siamese ships but was repelled in 1578, and in 1580 he again attacked Siam but also left Siam later that year. The Ming authorities tried to capture him while he continued to launch raids against Chinese ships in 1580–81. After 1581 there were no further reports of his piratical activity in Ming sources, suggesting he had retired from raiding and settled in Patani.

In Patani, Lin obtained a fief and briefly established a small port near Patani. He was said to have become the head of customs while members of his band gained prominence in the service of Patani's ruler. According to the local lore of Patani, he married the daughter of the Sultan (perhaps Raja Hijau), converted to Islam and built a mosque. A port near Patani he established and named after him existed for a while. He died in Patani, said to be due to cannon fire while he was testing cannons he had made for the queen of Pattani. Some suggested that he died in the 1580s, others proposed that he was still alive during the reign of Raja Biru in the early 17th century. He is believed to be buried in Kubo Bukit Cina, the oldest Chinese cemetery in Patani.

== Lore and legends ==
=== In Taiwan ===
There are a number of myths and legends about Lin in Taiwan, although historical sources give varying accounts of his presence of Taiwan and it is not clear where he had actually stayed. According to Taiwanese legends, Lin slaughtered many of the natives in Taiwan, using their blood as caulk for his ships. It was said that while anchored at Takau, Taiwan in 1563, Lin placed his treasure into eighteen and a half bamboo baskets, hiding them in the surrounding hills, and the Takau Hill then acquired an alternate name Buried-Gold Hill (埋金山). Another story goes that Lin was told by a Taoist master that he would be able to conquer all of China if, after he had performed certain tasks in a hundred days, he fired three arrows towards Beijing on the dawn of the last day. The master gave him 3 magic arrows and a "divine rooster". Lin handed the rooster in the care of his sister Jin-lien (金蓮). On the midnight of last day, Jin-lien inadvertently startled the rooster, causing it to crow. Lin awoke and mistakenly thought that dawn had arrived, immediately firing off three divine arrows with his name towards the imperial capital. The three arrows flew into the imperial palace, striking the Dragon Throne. However, as it was midnight, the throne was empty. The emperor found the three arrows with Lin's name on them stuck in his throne, realizing that Lin had attempted to kill him, then ordered his troops to attack Lin. Lin, however, managed to escape.

=== In Patani ===
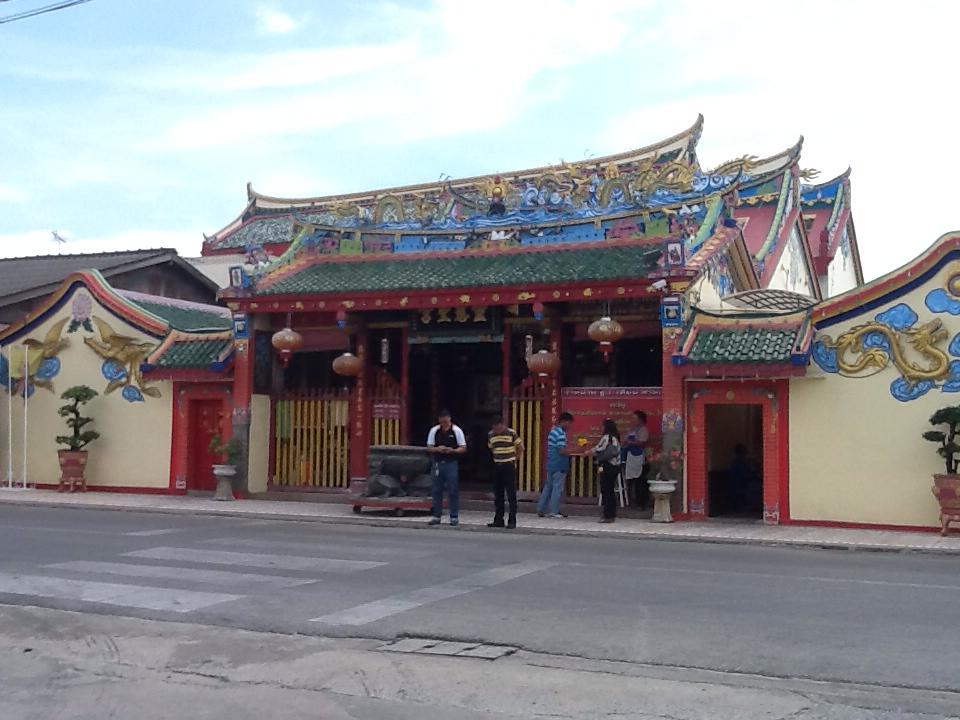
Shrine built in honour of Lim Ko Niao, said to be Lin Daoqian's sister

The Teochew people of Thailand tell a number of stories about Lin. In one, he was said to have helped the Siamese fight off an Annam attack and was thus given the daughter of the king to marry; however, he later angered the king after making a joke about killing the king, and had to flee. Another story involves the legend of Lim Ko Niao, said to be his sister in this account. Lim Ko Niao tried to persuade her brother to return to China with her after finding that her brother had married the local princess of Patani, converted to Islam and built the Krue Se Mosque. However he refused to return, and she then committed suicide by hanging from a cashew tree. Her gravestone, located next to the mosque, is said to have been built by her brother but probably actually created in the early 20th century. A shrine in her name exists in Patani and she is worshipped by some Chinese people in southern Thailand and from other countries.

According to Phongsawadan Mueang Pattani (Chronicle of Pattani), he attempted to cast three bronze cannons to be used in the wars of Pattani. After several failures with the third and largest cannon, he offered to sacrifice himself should his attempt be successful, and was blown up while testing this cannon. A 19th century Chinese account claims that the ruler of Patani was his descendant.

== Legacy ==
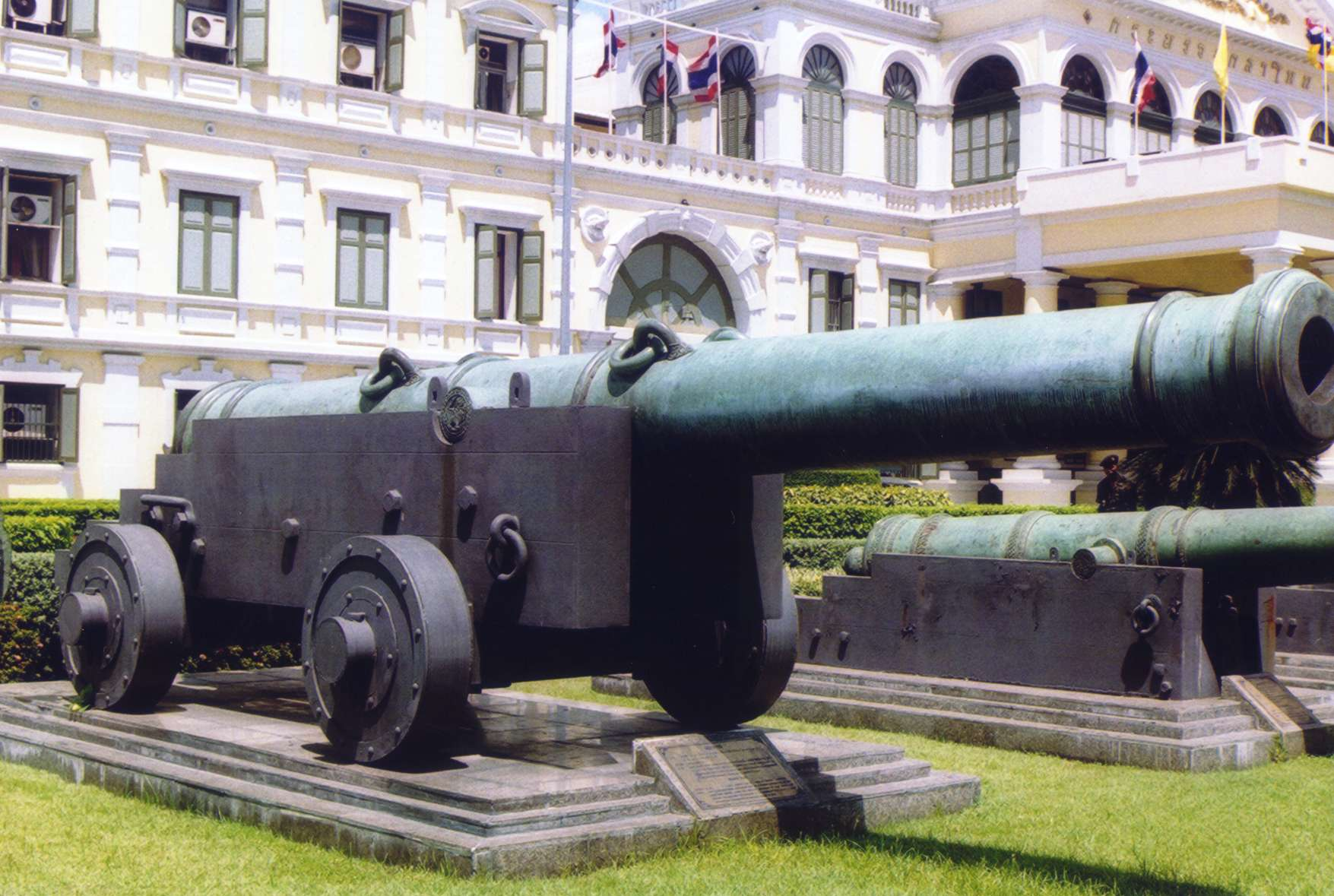
The Phaya Tani cannon that some believed was created by Lin, now placed in front of the Ministry of Defence in Bangkok

It is thought that Lin's activity in the area may have influenced the migration of Teochew people to Thailand in later years. A large number of Chinese people had already settled in Patani by early 17th century; Dutch merchant Olivier van Noort mentioned meeting a group of traders from Patani in Brunei in 1601 and that their community in Patani was Chinese enough to have their own king and used the same laws as in China. Another Dutch report of 1603 by Jacob van Neck estimated that there may be as many Chinese in Patani as there were native Malays. Many Malays in Kru Se, Patani claim descent from Lin, although they may have been descendants of his followers who married local women.

A cannon, the Phaya Tani cannon that some believed was made by Lin, was taken to Bangkok after Pattani was captured by Siam in 1785 and is now placed in front of the Ministry of Defence in Bangkok. The cannon is used in Pattani as a symbol of the province. A replica of Phaya Tani was created and placed in front of Krue Se Mosque in Pattani in 2013, but it was damaged by separatists who saw it as 'faked' and wanted the return of the actual cannon.
