= Shah Alam City F.C. Futsal =

Shah Alam City
- Full name: Shah Alam City FC Futsal Club
- Short name: Shah Alam City
- Founded: 2022; 4 years ago
- Owner: Shah Alam City Council
- Head coach: Muizzudin Mohd Haris
- League: Malaysia Premier Futsal League

Shah Alam City FC Futsal Club is a professional futsal club based in Shah Alam, Selangor, Malaysia that competes in the Malaysia Premier Futsal League the top tier of futsal in the country. The club was Established in 2022. The team plays its home matches at the Panasonic Sport Complex in Shah Alam, Selangor.

== History ==
In the 2024 MPFL season, Shah Alam City FC secured 4th place among eight teams, demonstrating a strong presence in the league. The team is coached by Muizzudin Haris, who has been instrumental in their competitive performance.

=== International Talent ===
Shah Alam City FC has incorporated international players into their squad, including Well Pereira and Faris Thaiya, enhancing the team's competitiveness and bringing diverse playing styles to the league.

=== Withrawal ===
After finishing 4th in the 2024 Malaysia Premier Futsal League (MPFL) Division 1, SACFC was relegated to MPFL Division 2 for the 2025 season. This marked a notable shift in their competitive standing. Despite their relegation, SACFC did not participate in the 2025 MPFL Division 2 season. They withdrew from the league, and the reasons for this decision have not been publicly disclosed.

== League and cup record ==
League												Playoffs	Malaysia Futsal Cup	AFF Futsal Club	AFC Futsal Club
Season	Div.	Teams	Pos.	Pld	W	D	L	GF	GA	GD	Pts	Playoffs	Malaysia Futsal Cup	AFF Futsal Club	AFC Futsal Club
2022	MPFL	15	8th	14	6	2	6	35	37	−2	20	-	-		
2023	MPFL Group B	7	4th	12	6	0	6	43	43	0	18	-	-		
2024	MPFL Division 1	8	4th	14	6	3	5	68	52	+16	21	-	-		

== Club officials ==
As of February 2024

Position	Name
Team manager	(Malaysia) Shahrizat Zulkifli
Head coach	(Malaysia) Muizzudin Mohd Haris
Goalkeeper coach	(Malaysia) Azlizan Ilyas
Fitness coach	(Malaysia) Hanifah Hamzah
Physiotherapist	(Malaysia) Mohd Zahin Naim
