= Hikayat Patani =

Semi-legendary tales from southern Thailand

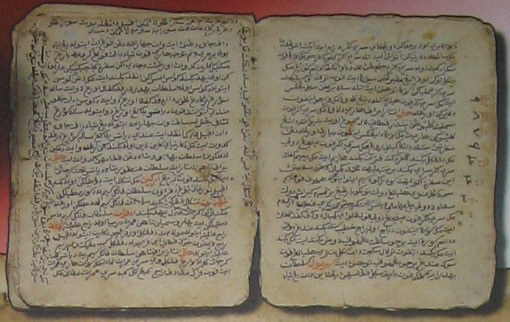
The Hikayat Patani in Arabic Jawi script

The Hikayat Patani (Jawi: حكاية ڤتاني), meaning "story of Pattani", is a semi-legendary set of tales that chronicle the history of the Patani Kingdom, now a southern province of Thailand.

These stories date to as early as the late 15th century but were most likely first recorded at various times between 1690 and 1730 by as many as six different authors (the sections outlined below were first established by linguist Andries Teeuw and historian David K. Wyatt) and written in the Jawi alphabet.

The stories survive in a number of original manuscripts, the earliest transcribed by Munshi Abdullah in 1839 and held in the Library of Congress.

== Sections ==
Part One: Stories of the Inland Dynasty – The first section, which includes pages 1–74 of the 1839 manuscript, details events during the reign of the Inland Dynasty, which ruled Pattani from foundation, as early as the mid-14th century, until its fall in the 17th century. The tales are essentially an account of the rajas, in succession. No explanation is given for the emergence of the tradition of female rulership, so one must assume the authors of the chronicle thought the matter irrelevant.

Part Two: Stories of the Kelantan Dynasty – This section, comprising pages 74–78 in the 1839 manuscript, tells of the rise to power of Raja Bakal and the succession of kings until the fall of Alung Yunus. These stories possess a style that indicates the authors were contemporary to the events they describe. Once again, the stories concentrate on the deeds of the rulers of Pattani, though this section is filled with the succession conflict and declining economic realities evident in the region after 1688. Two dates are given for the rulers below, the first based upon Teeuw & Wyatt's chronology and the other from al-Fatani (see references below).

Part Three: Bendaharas of Pattani – This section gives a brief account of the bendaharas (prime ministers or royal treasurers) who served the rulers of Pattani.

Part Four: Datuk Cerak Kin – This story tells of the elephant doctor Cau Hand and his descendants, including the Bendahara Datuk Cerak Kin, who appears to have been a particularly powerful bendahara. A Thai version of the Hikayat Patani, which continues events after 1729, claims that Datuk Cerak Kin succeeded Alung Yunus to the throne of Pattani, but did not survive long.

Part Five: Datuk Sai – This story tells of the activities of Datuk Sai and the struggle between various contenders for the throne during the Kelantan Dynasty.

Part Six: Laws of Pattani – This section, among other things, details how the royal orchestra is supposed to perform during important royal ceremonies. This section fully exhibits the sacred power of the text itself.
