= Matheus Rodrigues =

Brazilian futsal player

Personal information
- Full name: Matheus Rodrigues Cézar da Silva
- Date of birth: 3 October 1996 (age 30)
- Place of birth: São Paulo, Brazil
- Height: 1.85 m (6 ft 1 in)
- Position: Winger

Team information
- Current team: FC Barcelona
- Number: 3

Youth career
- Corinthians

Senior career*
Years	Team	Apps	(Gls)
2016–2020	Corinthians	34	(12)
2020–	FC Barcelona		

International career
2018–	Brazil		
- * Club domestic league appearances and goals as of 00:00, 28 January 2022 (UTC)

Matheus Rodrigues Cézar da Silva (born 3 October 1996) is a Brazilian futsal player who plays for FC Barcelona and the Brazilian national futsal team as a winger.
