= TOT United F.C. =

TOT United
- Full name: TOT United Futsal Team
- Short name: TOT
- Founded: 2022; 4 years ago(as Selangor TOT United)
- Ground: Panasonic Sport Complex
- Owner: Selayang Municipal Council
- Head coach: Qusmaini Noor Rusli
- League: Malaysia Premier Futsal League

TOT United Futsal Team is a professional futsal club based in Gombak, Selangor, Malaysia that competes in the Malaysia Premier Futsal League. The club was formed in 2022.

== History ==
Founded in early 2022 as Selangor TOT United, they debuted in the Malaysia Premier Futsal League in 2022 season. For 2024 MPFL Division 1 Selangor TOT United was renamed to Gombak TOT United.

TOT United competes in the MPFL Division 1, the top tier of Malaysian futsal. In the 2024 season, they finished 6th out of 8 teams. The 2025 season commenced on 8 March and is scheduled to conclude on 12 July 2025.

Gombak TOT United officially changed its name to TOT United for the 2025 season. This rebranding involved dropping the "Gombak" part of the name, so the club is now simply known as TOT United.

To recap the name history:

- 2022: Founded as Selangor TOT United
- 2024: Renamed to Gombak TOT United
- 2025: Rebranded to TOT United

This name change likely reflects the club’s ambition to establish a broader, national identity without being tied to a specific geographic location like Gombak.

== Crest ==
2024

2022,23 and current

== League and cup record ==
League												Playoffs	Malaysia Futsal Cup	AFF Futsal Club	AFC Futsal Club
Season	Div.	Teams	Pos.	Pld	W	D	L	GF	GA	GD	Pts	Playoffs	Malaysia Futsal Cup	AFF Futsal Club	AFC Futsal Club
2022	MPFL	15	6th	14	6	2	6	45	36	+9	20	-	-	tba	tba
2023	MPFL Group B	7	4th	12	7	0	5	57	33	+24	21	-	-		

== Current squad ==
As of 21 June 2024

#	Position	Name	Nationality
1	GK	Zulkifli Mohd Amin	(Malaysia)
2	DF	Muhammad Muiz Jamil Azaman	(Malaysia)
3	DF	Muhammad Aniff Alim Haris Fazilal	(Malaysia)
4	DF	Imran Syamim Mohd Saifullah	(Malaysia)
5	DF	Muhammad Hafizi Marzuki	(Malaysia)
7	FW	Muhammad Amirul Hakimi Mohd Admi	(Malaysia)
8	FW	Muhammad Farhan Baahrim	(Malaysia)

== Club officials ==
As of February 2024

Position	Name
Team manager	(Malaysia) HARIS Fazilal Ahmad
Head coach	(Malaysia) Qusmaini Noor Rusli
Goalkeeper coach	(Malaysia) Mohd Haris Fadillah Supyan
Fitness coach	(Malaysia) Suhhaimi Ishak
Physiotherapist	(Malaysia) Meor Ahmad Hisham
