= Charoen Suepsaeng =

Thai politician

Charoen Suepsaeng (or Jaroen Suebsang; 11 November 1902 – 27 December 1969) was a Thai politician who represented the Pattani Province.

== Early life ==
Charoen Suepsaeng born 11 November 1902 is second child of Sui Suebsang and Aun Suebsung And He is brother of Charun Suepsaeng. He graduated at Chulalongkorn University in 1913. He died on 27 December 1969.

== Work ==
He was public servant at Department of Public Health is Physician backup between 1925 and 1930.

In 1934 He worked in Department of Public Health and He came back to Pattani on 1 May 1936.

== Political career ==
Charoen worked in Political in 1936. He elected as member of Pattani City Council. And 1940 to 1946 He elected as mayor of Pattani.

After He elected as member house of representatives of Thailand in January 1946
