= Patani Kingdom =

c. 1400–1902 Malay sultanate in the northern Malay Peninsula

Sultanate of Patani كسلطانن ڤطاني Kesultanan Pattani
- c. 1400–1902
- Flag (until 1816)

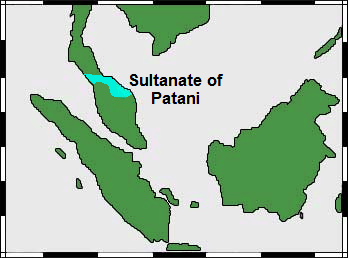
- Map of the Sultanate of Patani
- Capital: Pattani
- Common languages: Malay language (Classical Malay; court language Kelantan-Pattani Malay; spoken daily language)
- Religion: Sunni Islam
- Government: Monarchy
  - Raja of Patani (last): Abdul Kadir of Patani
- Historical era: Middle Ages
  - Established: c. 1400
  - Height of prosperity: 1584–1688
  - Conquest by Siam: 1786
  - Annexation by Siam and last raja deposed: 1902
Preceded by	Succeeded by
Langkasuka	Rattanakosin Kingdom; Kelantan Darul Naim
- Today part of: Thailand; Malaysia

Patani, or the Sultanate of Patani (Jawi: كسلطانن ڤطاني) was a Malay sultanate in the historical Patani Region. It covered approximately the area of the modern Thai provinces of Patani, Yala, Narathiwat and part of the Malaysian state of Kelantan. The 2nd–15th century state of Langkasuka and the 6th–7th century state of Pan Pan may have been related.

The golden age of Patani started during the reign of the first of its four successive queens, Raja Hijau (The Green Queen), who came to the throne in 1584 and was followed by Raja Biru (The Blue Queen), Raja Ungu (The Purple Queen) and Raja Kuning (The Yellow Queen). During this period the kingdom's economic and military strength was greatly increased to the point that it was able to fight off four major Siamese invasions. It had declined by the late 17th century and it was invaded by Siam in 1786, which eventually absorbed the state after its last raja was deposed in 1902.

== Predecessors ==
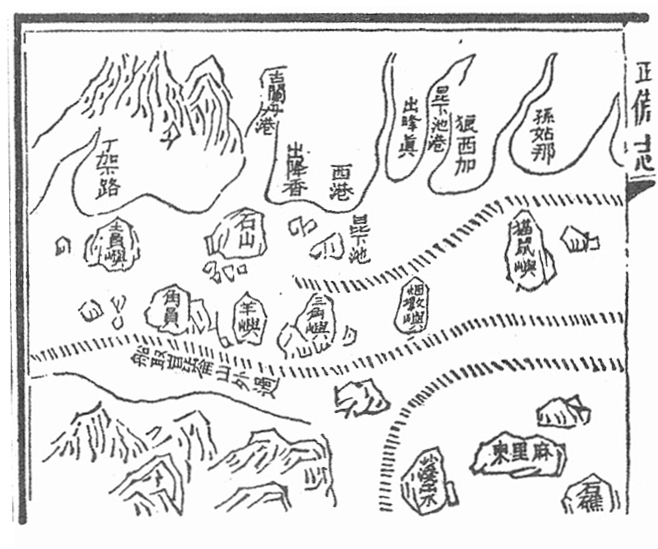
Mao Kun map, believed to date from the voyages of Zheng He in the 1420s, showing Langkasuka (狼西加) next to Songkla. The name Patani has yet to appear.

An early kingdom in the Patani area was the Hindu-Buddhist Langkasuka, founded in the region as early as the 2nd century. It appeared in many accounts by Chinese travellers, among them was the Buddhist pilgrim Yijing. The kingdom drew trade from Chinese, Indian, and local traders as a stopping place for ships bound for, or arriving from, the Gulf of Thailand. Langkasuka reached its greatest economic success in the 6th and 7th centuries and afterward declined as a major trade center. Political circumstances suggest that by the 11th century, Langkasuka was no longer a major port visited by merchants. However, much of the decline may be due to the silting up of the waterway linking it to the sea.

The most substantial ruins believed to be ancient Langkasuka have been found in Yarang located approximately 15 kilometres from the sea and the current city of Patani. How or when Langkasuka was replaced by Patani is unknown. Patani is not mentioned in the Javanese text Nagarakretagama written in 1365, but places such as Langkasuka, Sai and Kelantan are, which may indicate Patani had yet to be founded in this period. Hikayat Patani indicates that the immediate predecessor of Patani was Kota Mahligai ("the citadel town") whose ruler founded Patani, perhaps some time between 1350 and 1450. This Patani was located in Keresik (name in Malay) or Kru Se (in Thai), a few kilometers to the east of the current city.

However, some think Patani was the same country known to the Chinese as Pan Pan.

The region had been subject to Siamese control for some time. In the 14th century, King Ram Khamhaeng the Great (c. 1239 – 1317) of Sukhothai occupied Nakhon Si Thammarat and its vassal states which would include Patani if it had existed at that date. The Siamese Ayutthaya Kingdom also conquered the isthmus during the 14th century, and controlled many smaller vassal states in a self-governing system in which the vassal states and tributary provinces pledged allegiance to the king of Ayutthaya, but otherwise ran their own affairs.

== Founding legends ==
The Hikayat Patani suggests the name Patani means "this beach" which is "pata ni" (pantai ini) in the local Malay language. In this story, a ruler went hunting one day and saw a beautiful white mouse-deer the size of a goat, which then disappeared. He asked his men where the animal had gone, and they replied: "Pata ni lah!" This ruler then ordered a town be built where the mouse-deer had disappeared it was then named after "this beach". The founder is named in some sources as either Sri Wangsa or Phaya Tunakpa, a ruler of Kota Malikha or Kota Mahligai. The first ruler of Patani (some sources say his son) later converted to Islam and took the name Sultan Ismail Shah or Mahmud Shah.

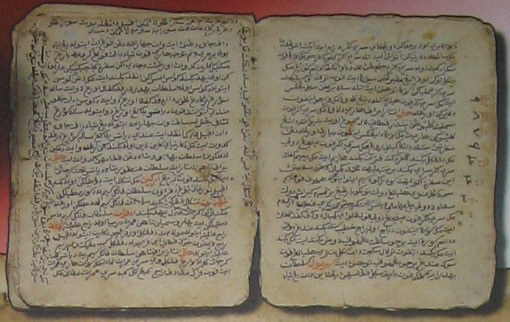
The Hikayat Patani

The Hikayat Patani also mentions that the ruler met an old fisherman there, who replied "Encik Tani" ("Mister Tani") when asked his name. An alternative suggestion is therefore that the town was named after the old fisherman, Pak Tani (Father Tani), who was sent by a king from the interior to survey the coast, to find a place for an appropriate settlement. After he established a successful fishing outpost, other people moved to join him. The town that grew into a prosperous trading center would continue to bear his name.

== History ==
=== Early history ===
Patani has been suggested to be founded some time between 1350 and 1450, although its history before 1500 is unclear. According to the Malay Annals, a prince named Sri Wangsa, founded Patani by conquering Kota Mahligai. He converted to Islam and took on the title of Sri Sultan Ahmad Shah in the late 14th to early 15th century. Patani may have become Islamised some time in the middle of 15th century, one source gives a date of 1470, but earlier dates have been proposed.

A story tells of a sheikh named Sa'id or Shafi'uddin from Kampong Pasai (presumably a small community of traders from Pasai who lived on the outskirts of Patani) reportedly healed the king of a rare skin disease. After much negotiation (and recurrence of the disease), the king agreed to convert to Islam, adopting the name Sultan Ismail Shah. All of the Sultan's officials also agreed to convert. However, there is fragmentary evidence that some local people had begun to convert to Islam prior to this. The existence of a diasporic Pasai community near Patani shows the locals had regular contact with Muslims.

Patani became more important after Malacca was captured by the Portuguese in 1511 as Muslim traders sought alternative trading ports. A Dutch source indicates that most of the traders were Chinese, but 300 Portuguese traders had also settled in Patani by 1540s, but there were also Siamese and Japanese merchants. Portuguese sources mentioned their attack on Patani in 1524 and Chinese living in the city. Raja Mahmud ruled in the mid-16th century and was seen as 'ruling justly' which caused considerable developments to the region.

Sultan Ismail Shah was succeeded by Mudhaffar Shah. This period saw the rise of Burma, which made war on Ayutthaya. Another Burmese-Siamese war (1563–1564) led by King Bayinnaung forced King Maha Chakkraphat to surrender in 1564. Taking advantage of the instability in Ayutthaya, the sultan of Patani Mudhaffar Shah attacked Ayutthaya in 1563 due to his unwelcome reception in the Thai court in the years prior. King Chakkraphat fled the city for two months but Mudhaffar failed to take the throne. He died suddenly in 1564 on his way back to Patani. His brother Sultan Manzur Shah (1564–1572) who was left in charge in Patani while he was away then became the ruler of Patani.

Manzur Shah ruled for nine years, and after his death, Patani entered a period of political instability and violence. Two of its rulers were murdered by their relatives in fights for succession. The nine-year-old Raja Patik Siam (son of Mudhaffar Shah) and his regent (his aunt Raja Aisyah), were both murdered by his brother Raja Mambang, who was in turn killed. The son of Manzur Shah, Raja Bahdur, succeeded at the age of 10, but was later murdered by his half-brother Raja Bima after a dispute, and Raja Bima was himself killed.

=== Four queens of Patani ===
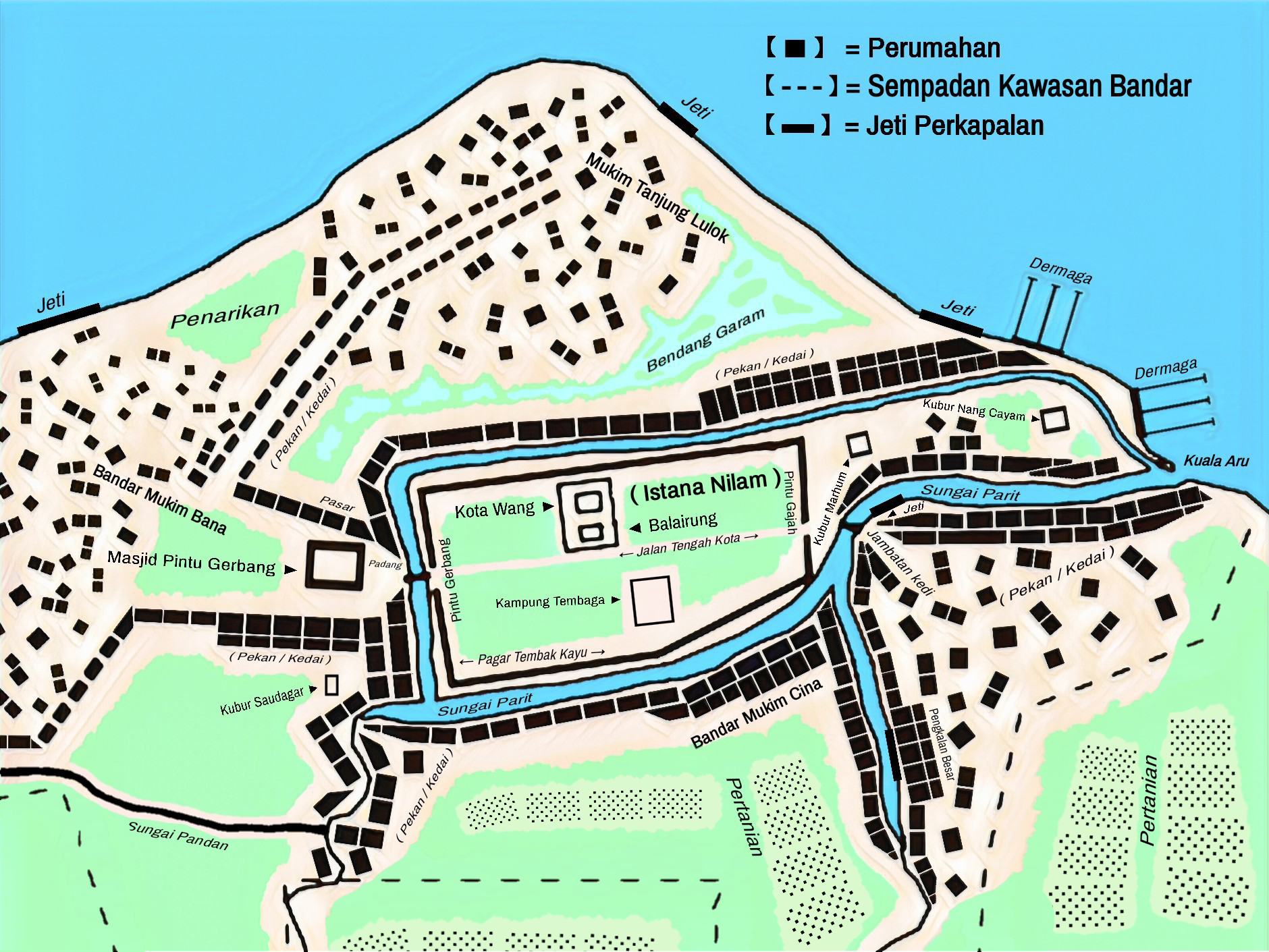
Sketch map of the city of Patani

==== Raja Hijau and the golden age of Patani ====
Raja Hijau (or Ratu Hijau, the Green Queen) came to the throne in 1584, apparently the result of a lack of male heirs after they were all killed in the turbulent preceding period, and became the first queen of Patani. Raja Hijau acknowledged Siamese authority, and adopted the title of peracau derived from the Siamese royal title phra chao. Early in her reign she saw off an attempted coup by her prime minister, Bendahara Kayu Kelat. She also ordered that a channel be dug with a river dammed to divert water to ensure the supply of water to Patani.

Raja Hijau ruled for 32 years, and brought considerable stability to the country. During her reign, trade with the outside increased, and as a result Patani prospered. It also become a centre of culture, producing high quality works of music, dance, drama and handicraft. An Englishman Peter Floris who visited Patani in 1612–1613 described a dance performed in Patani as the finest he had seen in the Indies.

===== Growth as an entrepôt =====
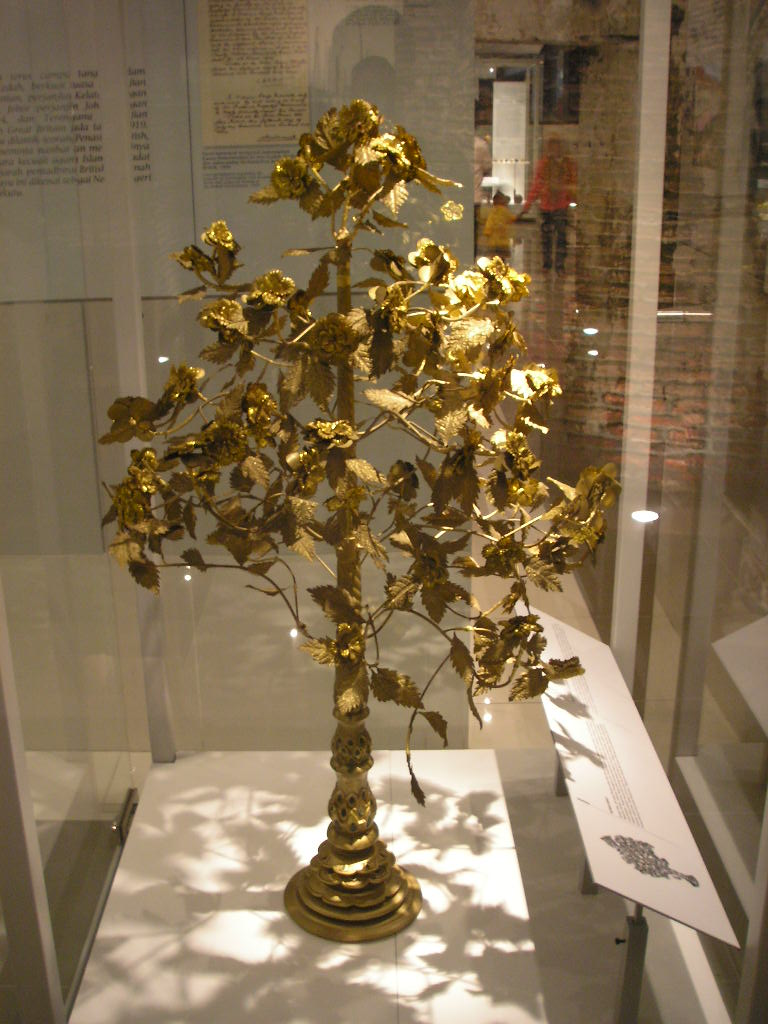
Bunga mas, the tribute sent every three years to the Siamese ruler in Ayutthaya and Bangkok as symbol of friendship by the ruler of Patani. The sending of the Bunga mas began in the 14th century.

Chinese merchants were important in the rise of Patani as a regional trade center. Chinese, Malay and Siamese merchants traded throughout the area, as well as Persians, Indians and Arabs. They were joined by others including the Portuguese in 1516, the Japanese in 1592, the Dutch in 1602, the English in 1612. The period of prosperity lasted between 1584 and 1688. Many Chinese also moved to Patani, perhaps due to the activity of Chinese pirate Lin Daoqian. A 1603 Dutch report by Jacob van Neck estimated that there may be as many Chinese in Patani as there were native Malays, and that they were responsible for most of the commercial activity of Patani. In 1619, John Jourdain, the East India Company's chief factor at Bantam was killed off the coast of Patani by the Dutch. Ships were also lost, which eventually led to the withdrawal of the English from Patani.

Potteries from the middle Ming to late Qing dynasties are found in the city, indicating extensive faraway trade. Patani was seen by European traders as a way to access the Chinese market. After 1620, the Dutch and English both closed their warehouses, but a prosperous trade was continued by the Chinese, Japanese, and Portuguese for most of the 17th century.

==== Blue and Purple Queens ====
Raja Hijau died on 28 August 1616 and was succeeded by her sister Raja Biru (the Blue Queen), who was around 50 when she became queen. Raja Biru persuaded the Kelantan Sultanate that lay to the south to become incorporated into Patani.

After Raja Biru died in 1624, she was succeeded by her younger sister Raja Ungu (the Purple Queen). Raja Ungu, was more confrontational towards the Siamese, and abandoned the Siamese title peracau, using instead paduka syah alam ("her excellency ruler of the world"). She stopped paying the bunga mas tribute to Siam, and formed an alliance with Johor, marrying her daughter (who later became Raja Kuning) off to their ruler Sultan Abdul Jalil Shah III. However, her daughter was already married to the king of Bordelong (Phatthalung), Okphaya Déca, who prompted the Siamese to attack Patani in 1633–1634. Siam, however, failed to take Patani.

==== Yellow Queen and decline ====
Raja Ungu died in 1634, and was succeeded by the last of four successive female rulers of Patani, Raja Kuning (or Ratu Kuning, the Yellow Queen). The war with Siam had caused considerable suffering to Patani as well as a significant decline in trade, and Raja Kuning adopted a more conciliatory stance towards the Siamese. The Siamese had intended to attack Patani again in 1635, but the Raja of Kedah intervened to help with the negotiation. In 1641, Raja Kuning visited the Ayutthayan court to resume good relation. The power of the queen had declined by this period, and she did not appear to wield any significant political power. In 1646, Patani joined other tributary states to rebel against Ayutthaya, but was later subdued by Ayutthaya.

=== Kelantanese rajas ===
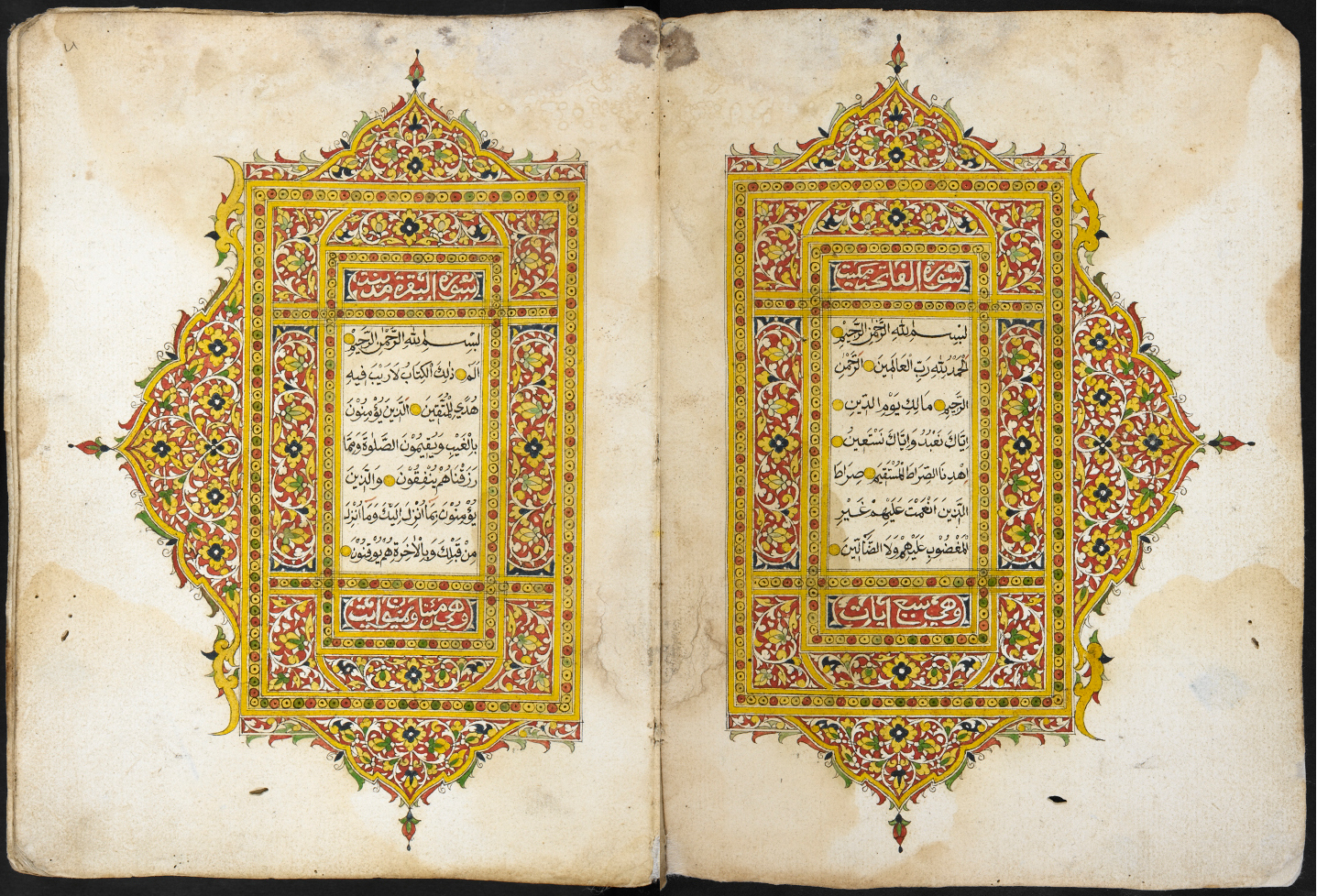
Double-page opening of a Malay Qur’an manuscript from Patani, second half of the 19th century, British Library

According to Kelantanese sources, Raja Kuning was deposed in 1651 by the Raja of Kelantan, who installed his son as the ruler of Patani, and the period of Kelantanese dynasty in Patani began. A different queen appeared to have been in control of Patani again by 1670, and three queens of Kelantan lineage may have ruled Patani from 1670 to 1718.

When Phetracha took control of Ayutthaya in 1688, Patani refused to acknowledge his authority and rebelled. Ayutthaya then invaded with 50,000 men and subdued Patani. Following the invasion, political disorder continued for five decades, during which the local rulers were helpless to end the lawlessness of the region, and most foreign merchants abandoned trade with Patani. Towards the end of the 17th century, Patani was described in Chinese sources as sparsely populated and barbaric.

A dynasty originating from Kelantan ruled the court from 1688, however much factional disputes caused troubles and pushed trade away. Since 1730, the Hikayat Patani mentions "Patani has been in great confusion and its people suffering many ills". Around 1750s, Patani made some incursions south into Kelantan.

=== Reassertion of Siamese power ===
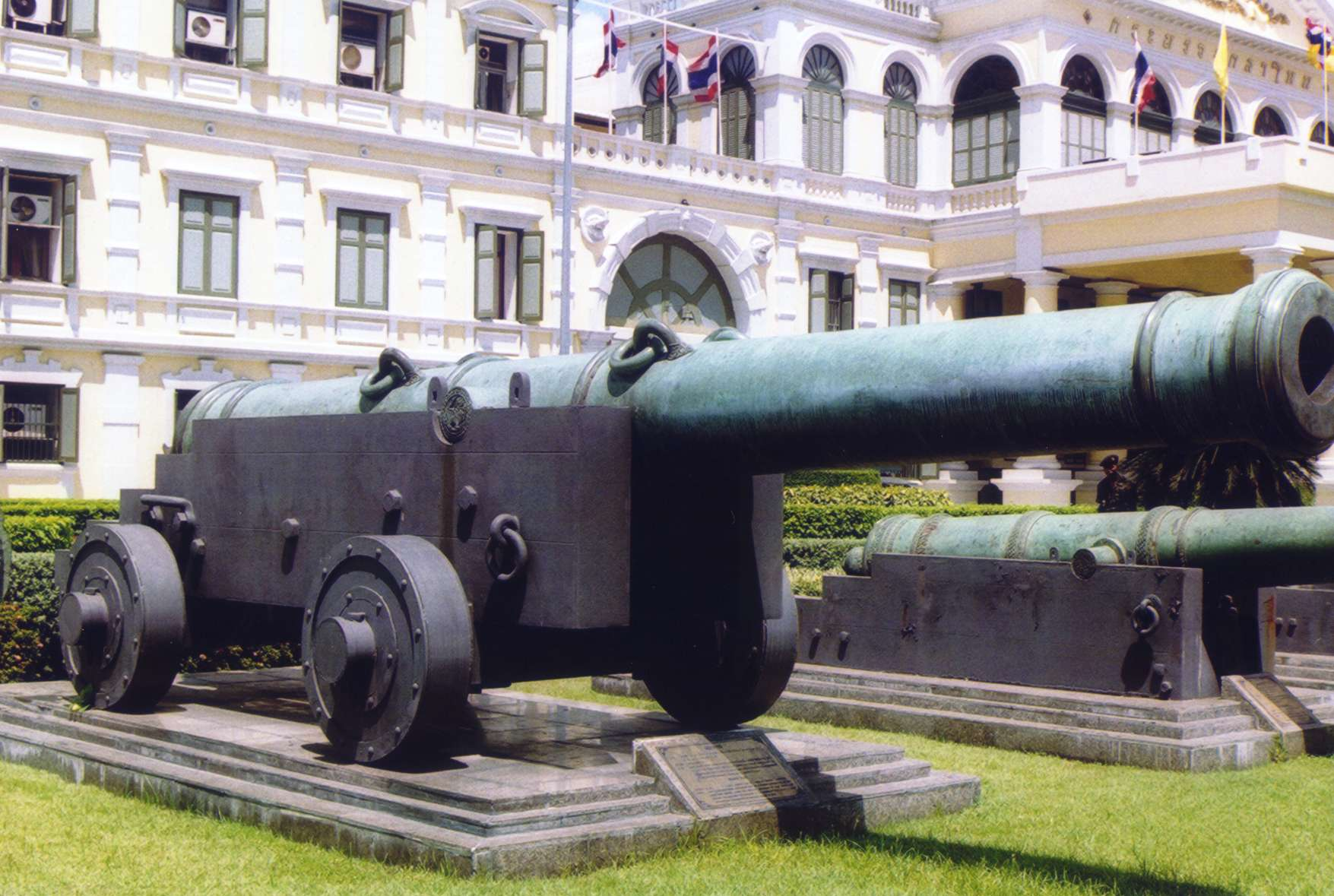
The Phaya Tani, a cannon of Patani taken to Bangkok after the defeat of Patani in 1786

In the 18th century, Ayutthaya under King Ekkathat faced another Burmese invasion. This culminated in the capture and destruction of the city of Ayutthaya in 1767, as well as the death of the king. Siam was shattered, and as rivals fought for the vacant throne, Patani declared its complete independence.

King Taksin defeated the Burmese and reunified the country, opening the way for the establishment of the Chakri dynasty by his successor, King Rama I. In 1786 Siam sent an army led by Prince Surasi (Viceroy Boworn Maha Surasinghanat), younger brother of King Rama I, to seek the submission of Patani.

==== Patani in the Bangkok period ====
Patani in 1837

The siege of Patani by Siam occurred in 1786, this is followed by the destruction of the town, massacres as well as deportations of the inhabitants. Further, Siam invaded Patani several times in 1789–1791, 1808, 1831–1832 and 1838. This served to completely end the centuries-old mandala system, effectively ending Patani's status of an independent state. Bangkok divided Patani into seven small principalities (hua muang). Britain recognised the Siamese ownership of Patani in the Burney Treaty in 1826. The throne stayed vacant for a few decades until 1842, when a member of Kelantanese royalty returned to reclaim the throne. While the raja ruled over Patani independently of Siam, Patani also recognised the authority of Siam and regularly sent the bunga mas tribute.

In 1902, in a bid to assert full control of Patani, Siam arrested and deposed the last raja of Patani after he refused Siam's demand for administrative reform, thus ending Patani as an independent state.

== Chronology of rulers ==
=== Inland dynasty (Sri Wangsa) ===
1. Chau Sri Wangsa (c. 1488–1511), the Siamese prince said in some sources to have conquered Kota Mahligai and founded the settlement of Patani, converted to Islam, took on the title of Sri Sultan Ahmad Shah.
2. Raja Intera/Phaya Tu Nakpa/Sultan Ismail Shah/Mahmud Shah (d. 1530?), founder of the kingdom according to one account, and the first ruler to convert to Islam. In fact, other rulers must have preceded him. It is also likely that during his reign the Portuguese first visited the port to trade, arriving in 1516.
3. Sultan Mudhaffar Shah Sultan who once held the throne of Ayutthaya (1530–1564), son of Sultan Ismail Shah, who died during an attack on Ayudhya (Siam)
4. Sultan Manzur Shah (1564–1572), brother of Sultan Mudhaffar Shah
5. Sultan Patik Siam (1572–1573), son of Sultan Mudhaffar Shah, who was murdered by his half-brother, Raja Bambang
6. Sultan Bahdur (1573–1584), son of Sultan Manzur Shah, who was considered a tyrant in most accounts
7. Ratu Hijau (the Green Queen) (1584–1616), sister of Sultan Bahdur, during whose reign Patani attained its greatest economic success as a middle-sized port, frequented by Chinese, Dutch, English, Japanese, Malays, Portuguese, Siamese, and other merchants.
8. Ratu Biru (the Blue Queen) (1616–1624), sister of Ratu Hijau
9. Ratu Ungu (the Purple Queen) (1624–1635), sister of Ratu Biru, who was particularly opposed to Siamese interference in local affairs
10. Ratu Kuning (the Yellow Queen) (1635–1651), daughter of Ratu Ungu and last queen of the Inland dynasty. Controversy surrounds the exact date of the end of her reign

=== First Kelantanese dynasty ===
1. Raja Bakal (1651–1670), after a brief invasion of Patani by his father in 1649, Raja Sakti I of Kelantan, he was given the throne in Patani.
2. Raja Mas Kelantan (Queen) (1670–1698), thought by Teeuw and Wyatt to be a king, but claimed by al-Fatani to be a queen, the widow of Raja Bakal and mother of the succeeding queen.
3. Raja Mas Chayam (Queen) (1698–1702 (1st reign) and 1716–1718 (2nd reign)), daughter of the two preceding rulers, according to al-Fatani.
4. Raja Dewi (Queen) (1702–1711)
5. Raja Bendang Badan (1716–1720 or ?–1715), he was afterwards raja of Kelantan, 1715–1733
6. Raja Laksamana Dajang (1720–1721; Fatani gives no dates)
7. Raja Alung Yunus (1728–1729 or 1718–1729)
8. Raja Yunus (1729–1749)
9. Raja Long Nuh (1749–1771)
10. Sultan Muhammad (1771–1785)
11. Tengku Lamidin (1785–1791)
12. Datuk Pengkalan (1791–1808)

=== Second Kelantanese dynasty ===
1. Sultan Phraya Long Muhammad Ibni Raja Muda Kelantan/Raja Kampong Laut Tuan Besar Long Ismail Ibni Raja Long Yunus (1842–1856)
2. Tuan Long Puteh Bin Sultan Phraya Long Muhammad (Phraya Patani II) (1856–1881)
3. Tuan Besar Bin Tuan Long Puteh (Phraya Patani III) (1881–1890)
4. Tuan Long Bongsu Bin Sultan Phraya Long Muhammad (Sultan Sulaiman Sharafuddin Syah / Phraya Patani IV)(1890–1898)
5. Sultan Abdul Kadir Kamaruddin Syah (Phraya Patani V) deposed in 1902 had descendants:
  - Tengku Sri Akar Ahmad Zainal Abidin
  - Tengku Mahmood Mahyideen
  - Tengku Besar Zubaidah, married Tengku Ismail the son of Tuan Long Besar (Phraya Patani III), had descendants:
    - Tengku Budriah of Perlis, Raja Perempuan of Perlis and Raja Permaisuri Agong (1924–2008)
    - Tengku Ahmad Rithaudeen, Minister of Trade and Industry, Defence, Information, Foreign Affairs and Member of the Dewan Rakyat in Kota Bharu (1929–2022)
    - Tengku Noor Zakiah, Malaysian Stockbroker, chairman of KIBB (Kenanga International Bank Berhad) (1926–)
    - Tengku Kamaruzzaman

== See also ==
- Assault on Ayutthaya (1564)
- Kelantan–Patani Malay
- Kingdom of Reman
- Ligor–Patani War (1629–1630)
- List of Sunni dynasties
- Patani (historical region)
- Patani province
- Siamese invasion of Patani (1786)
- Siamese–Patani War (1634)
- Southern Thailand insurgency
