= Patani Malays =

Nayu Taning / Oghe Jawoe
- Ethnolinguistic map of southern Thailand. Dark orange marks provinces where Patani Malays form the majority, while light orange shows areas with a mixed Thai and Malay population.

Total population
- 1.5 million (2018, est.)

Regions with significant populations
- Thailand (southern Thailand; mainly Pattani, Yala, Narathiwat, and parts of Songkhla; also in the Bangkok Metropolitan Region); Malaysia (primarily Kelantan and Kedah, with smaller communities elsewhere in Peninsular Malaysia)

Languages
- Kelantan–Pattani Malay (native); Thai, Southern Thai

Religion
- Islam

Related ethnic groups
- Other Malays

Patani Malays (Thai: มลายูปัตตานี, Jawi: ملايو ڤتاني, Pattani Malay: Nayu Taning, Malay: Melayu Patani) are an ethnolinguistic Malay Muslim community native to the southern border provinces of Thailand, particularly Pattani, Yala, Narathiwat, and parts of Songkhla. They form part of the wider Malay world (Alam Melayu) and share close linguistic, cultural, and religious ties with Malays in the northern Malaysian states of Kelantan and Terengganu.

Historically associated with the former Sultanate of Patani, a prominent Malay-Muslim polity that flourished between the fifteenth and eighteenth centuries, the Patani Malays developed a distinctive regional identity shaped by maritime trade, Islamic scholarship, and courtly traditions. Following the Siamese conquest of Patani in 1786 and the subsequent incorporation of the region into the Thai state, formalised by the Anglo-Siamese Treaty, the community became a Muslim and Malay-speaking minority within a predominantly Thai Buddhist nation-state.

The Patani Malays primarily speak Patani Malay, a dialect within the Kelantan–Patani branch of the Malay language continuum, and historically used the Jawi script for religious and literary purposes. Islam plays a central role in social organisation, education, and cultural life, with pondok religious schools and local ulama serving as important institutions of communal leadership.

In the contemporary period, the Patani Malays navigate a dual identity as Thai citizens and members of the broader Malay-Muslim cultural sphere. Issues of language preservation, religious autonomy, and regional political unrest have shaped public discourse, while cultural traditions in literature, performing arts, crafts, cuisine, and customary law continue to serve as key markers of communal identity.

== History ==
=== Early Settlement and Pre-Islamic Period ===
==== Origins and Early History ====
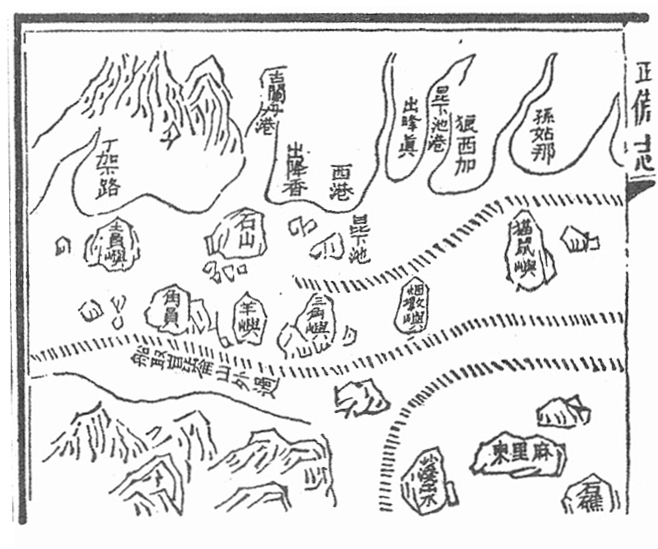
Mao Kun map - Songkla, Langkasuka, Kelantan, Trengganu

The region surrounding the Pattani River and its lower basin has been inhabited since prehistoric times. Its strategic position along the Gulf of Thailand made it an important part of early maritime trade routes that connected the Malay Peninsula with the wider Southeast Asian and Indian Ocean worlds. Archaeological findings and geographic studies indicate that the area supported coastal settlements engaged in trade, fishing, and small-scale agriculture long before the emergence of organized kingdoms.

The area that is now Patani was originally inhabited by the Hindu-Buddhist kingdom of Langkasuka, which is believed to have been established in the 2nd century CE. Langkasuka flourished as a major maritime trade center between the 6th and 7th centuries before gradually declining. It was later absorbed into the Srivijaya Empire, a powerful maritime confederation based in Palembang, which dominated the region from the 7th to the 13th centuries.

The name "Langkasuka" is derived from Sanskrit, meaning "resplendent land" or "bliss." While its exact location is debated, some sources suggest it was on the west coast of the Malay Peninsula, possibly near present-day Kedah, while others place it on the east coast, near Patani in present-day southern Thailand. Langkasuka maintained diplomatic and trade relations with China, sending envoys to the Chinese court as early as the 6th century under King Bhagadatta. Over time, however, its influence declined, and by the 15th century, it had been absorbed into the emerging Patani Kingdom.

==== Archaeological and Geographic Context ====
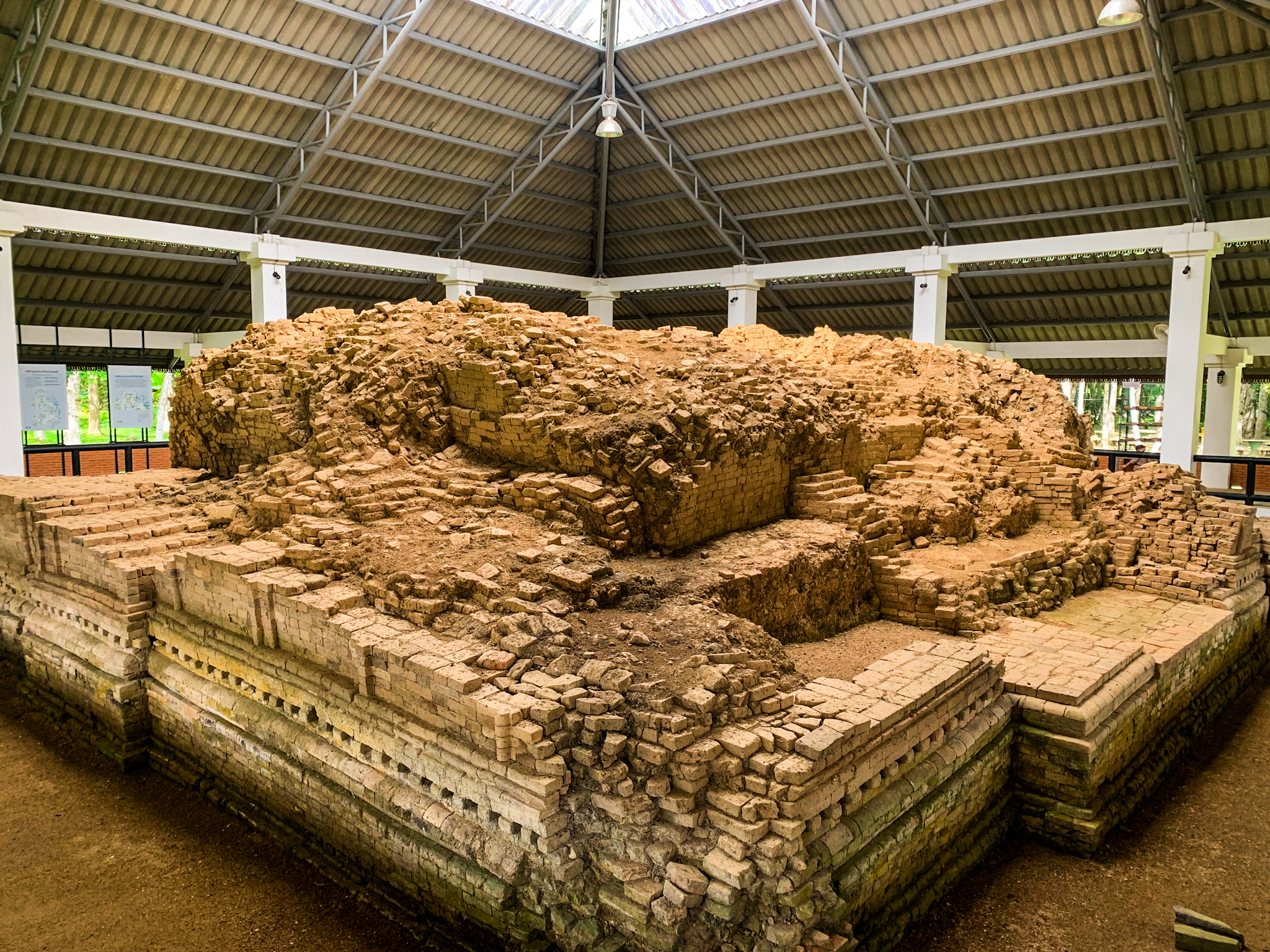
Yarang Ancient Town, Yarang district, Pattani, Thailand

Although physical evidence remains limited, historians and archaeologists have suggested possible links between the early kingdom of Langkasuka, which is believed to have flourished between the second and seventh centuries CE, and later Malay polities in the Patani area. Some scholars, including Jelani Harun, have discussed the ongoing debate on whether Langkasuka and Patani share a continuous cultural or political lineage. This discussion is partly informed by classical Malay texts such as the Tarikh Fathani, which describe the origins and development of early Malay kingdoms in the region.

Trade played a central role in shaping the area’s early history. The exchange of tin, forest products, gold, and ceramics attracted merchants from various parts of Asia, including India and China. These interactions encouraged the spread of Indianized cultural influences such as Hindu-Buddhist religious ideas, political institutions, and artistic forms. Over time, these influences blended with local Malay or proto-Malay traditions, creating distinctive coastal communities that would later form the cultural foundation of the Patani Malays.

==== Cultural and Religious Substrata ====
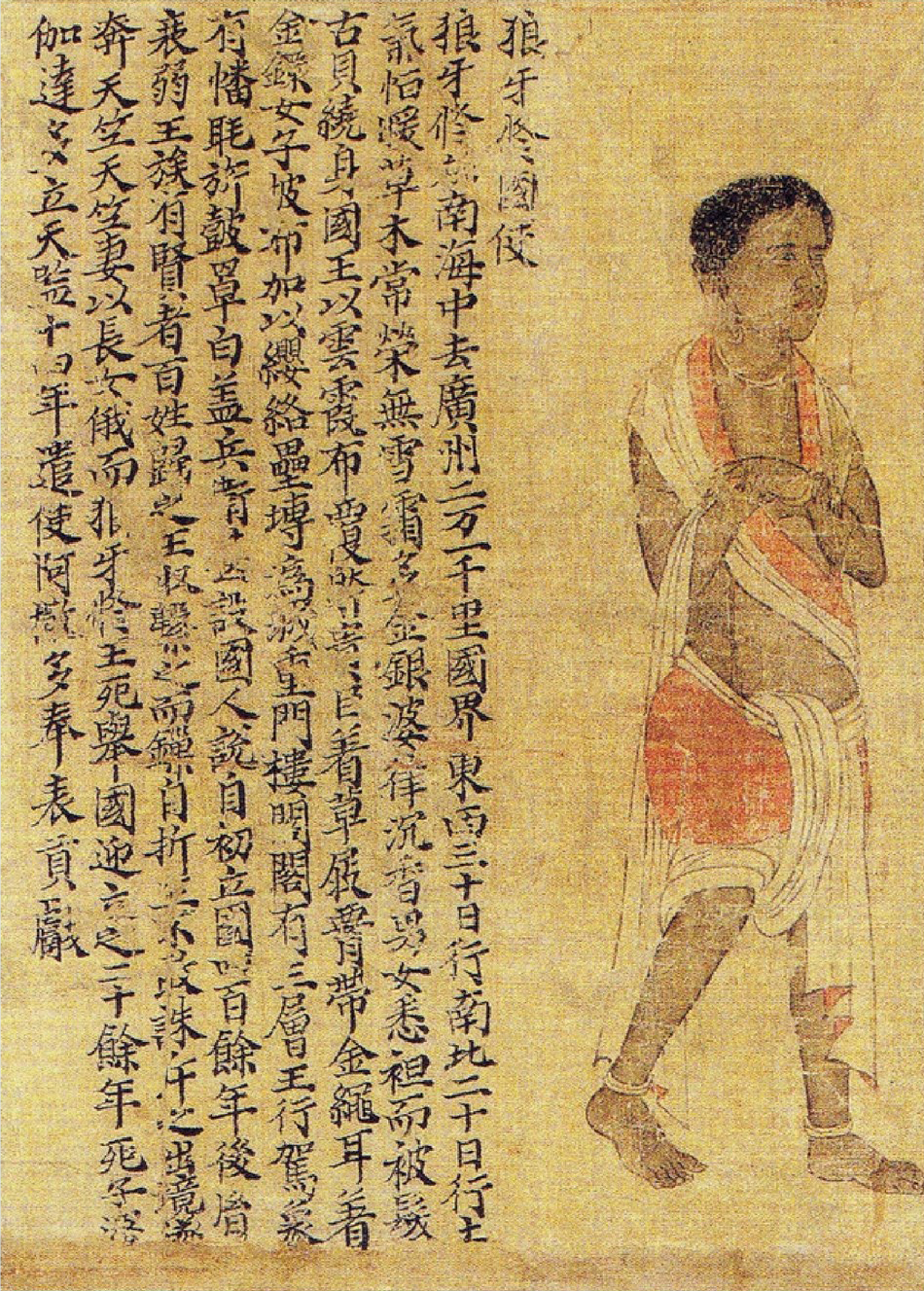
Envoy Achita from Langkasuka to Liang Dynasty Court c.526

Prior to the full establishment of Islam, local communities in the Patani region are believed to have practised a syncretic blend of animism, dynamism, and Hindu-Buddhist influenced customs and ritual forms. These belief systems reflected both the natural environment and the cultural exchanges that shaped the wider Malay Peninsula through trade and migration. Animistic traditions often involved reverence for ancestral spirits and natural elements, while Hindu-Buddhist influences were visible in early art, ritual practices and social organization.

According to research by Suryadi published in the UAS Journal, the spread of Islam in southern Thailand occurred through a gradual process of acculturation rather than abrupt religious conversion. He argues that many pre-Islamic cultural frameworks were absorbed into and reinterpreted within the emerging Malay-Muslim identity of the Patani region. This process allowed Islamic teachings to be expressed through existing local idioms, rituals, and values, facilitating acceptance among the population.

As a result, the transition to Islam did not entirely displace earlier spiritual and cultural systems. Instead, it produced a layered religious landscape in which Islamic faith interacted with indigenous beliefs and customs. This synthesis contributed to the distinctive cultural character of the Patani Malays, whose identity continues to reflect both Islamic devotion and older regional traditions.

=== Emergence of the Patani Sultanate (c. 15th century – 18th century) ===
==== Formation of a Malay-Muslim Polity ====
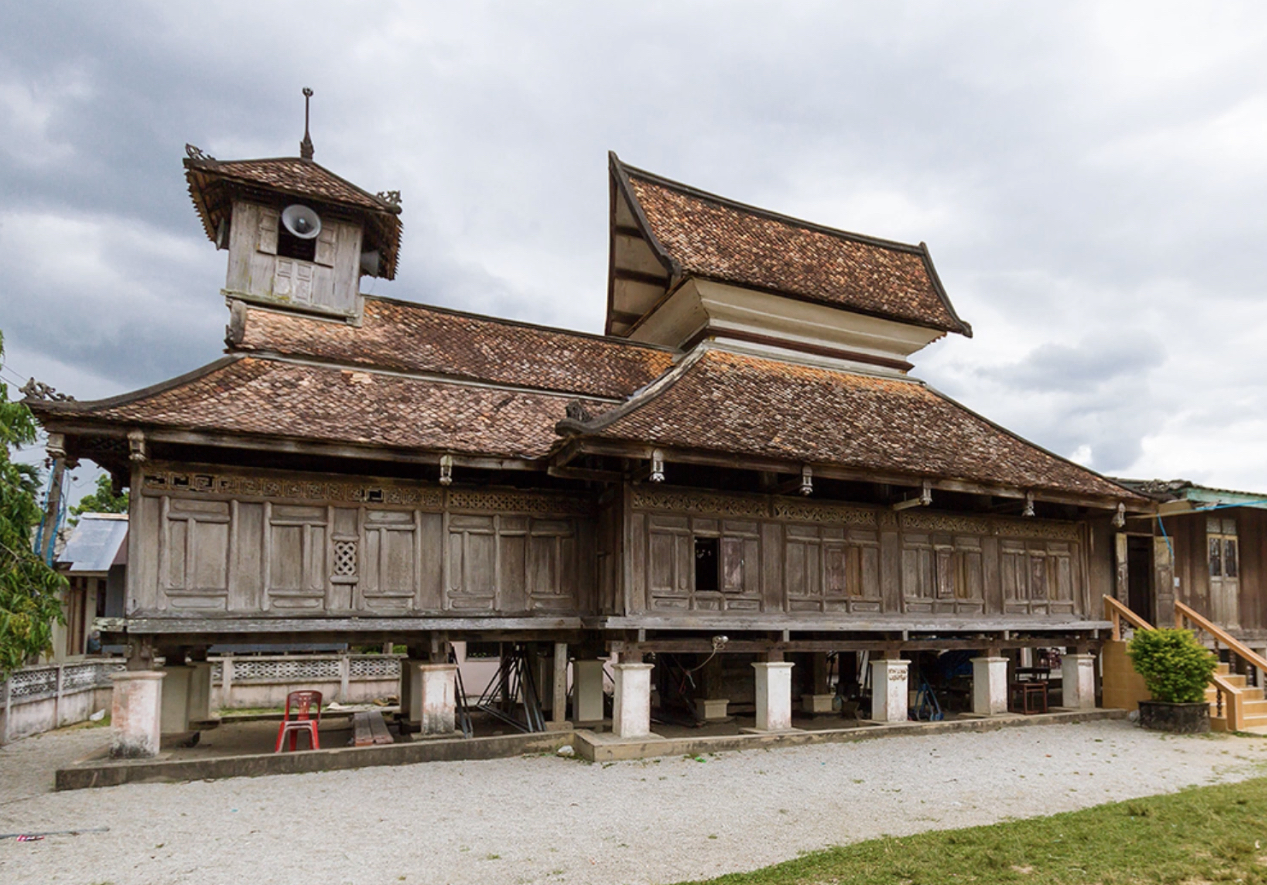
Talo Mano Mosque (300-Year Mosque) in Narathiwat province, Thailand.

The origins of the Patani Sultanate are not well-documented, but it is believed to have been founded between 1350 and 1450. According to the Hikayat Patani, the city was established after a ruler moved from an inland kingdom called Kota Mahligai to the coast, likely due to the strategic advantages of coastal trade. A local legend suggests that the name "Patani" is derived from the Malay phrase pata ni, meaning "this beach."

By the fifteenth century, Patani had begun to integrate into regional trade networks, particularly through contacts with the Samudera Pasai Sultanate. Islam was introduced gradually through merchants, scholars, and intermarriage, interacting with local syncretic traditions that combined animism, Hindu-Buddhist influences, and customary law (adat). According to the Hikayat Patani, the ruler Phaya Tu Nakpa converted to Islam after being cured of an illness by a Muslim preacher, often identified as Sheikh Saʿid from Pasai, and subsequently adopted the regnal name Sultan Ismail Shah. While the precise date remains debated, historians generally place the Islamisation of the court in the fifteenth century, possibly around the 1470s.

The conversion of the court marked a pivotal political and cultural transformation. Adoption of Islamic titulature, elements of Shafiʿi jurisprudence, and the patronage of scholars integrated Patani into the wider Malay-Islamic world. While adat continued to influence local governance and social norms, political authority increasingly reflected the moral and legal framework of a Muslim sultanate. By the fifteenth century, Patani had begun to consolidate its identity not merely as a coastal trading settlement but as a recognised centre of Malay-Muslim political and cultural authority.

==== Political Rise and Commercial Prominence ====
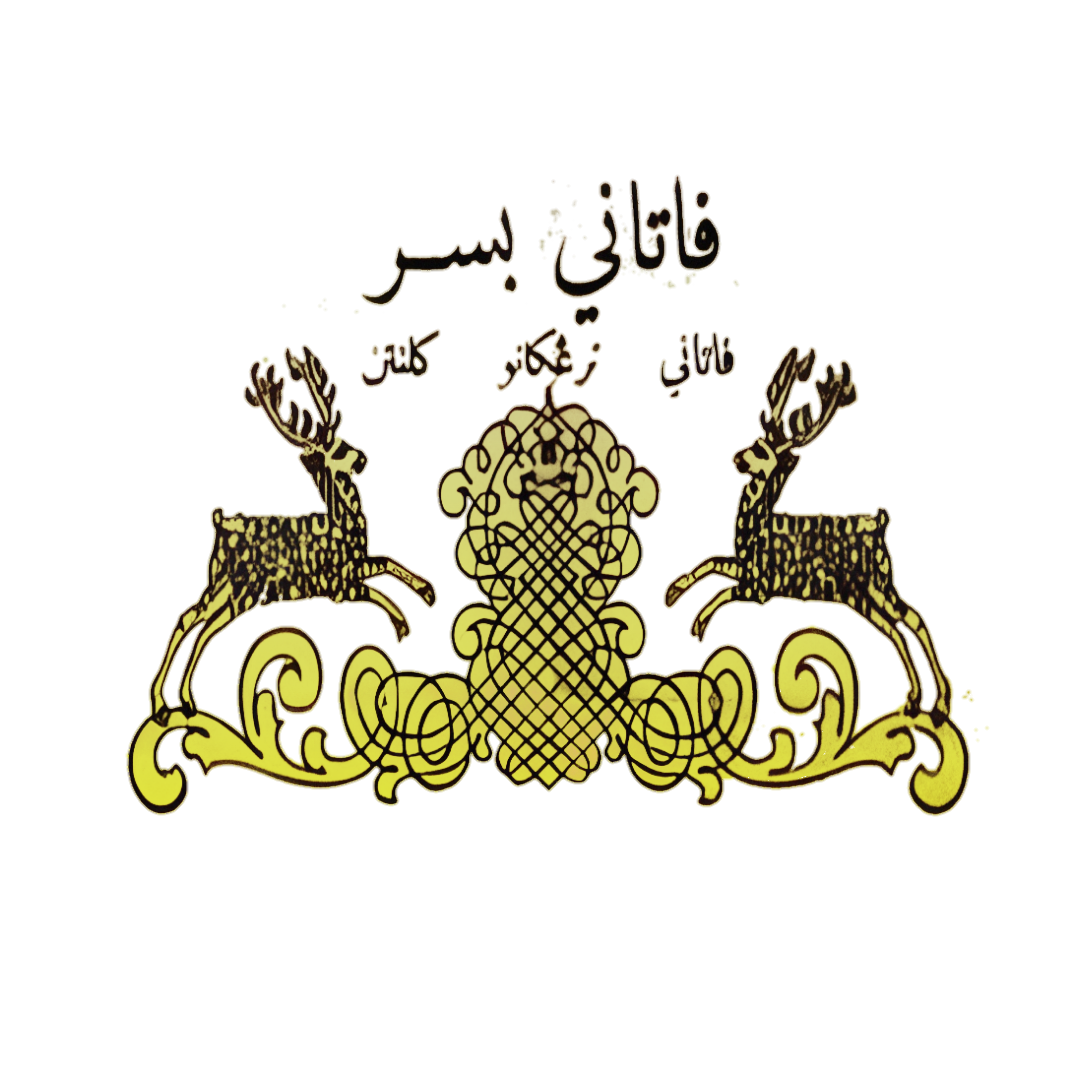
Coat of arms of Patani Besar

The Sultanate of Patani emerged as a prominent Malay-Muslim polity on the eastern coast of the Malay Peninsula, forming in the context of the decline of earlier regional powers such as Langkasuka and Tambralinga. Its growth was closely tied to the expansion of Muslim maritime trading networks centred on Melaka and other ports in the Straits of Malacca, consolidating Islamic political authority and Malay cultural identity along the Gulf of Thailand.

By the sixteenth and seventeenth centuries, Patani had developed into a major entrepôt linking traders from Siam, the Malay Peninsula, Sumatra, Java, and China. The kingdom’s strategic location allowed it to serve as an intermediary for the exchange of goods such as spices, forest products, tin, and textiles. According to Manan et al., Patani played a crucial role within the regional trading system, acting as a key hub between the Indian Ocean and the South China Sea. Its commercial success was supported by a cosmopolitan port society that included Malay, Chinese, and foreign merchants.

The sultanate’s prosperity also contributed to its political and cultural prominence. Royal patronage encouraged the development of Islamic scholarship, literature, and the arts, while trade wealth enhanced the court’s prestige within both the Malay world and the wider Southeast Asian region. Despite its status as a tributary of Siam, Patani maintained a degree of autonomy and cultivated strong maritime connections that reinforced its identity as a centre of Malay-Islamic civilization.

==== Queens and Cultural Florescence ====
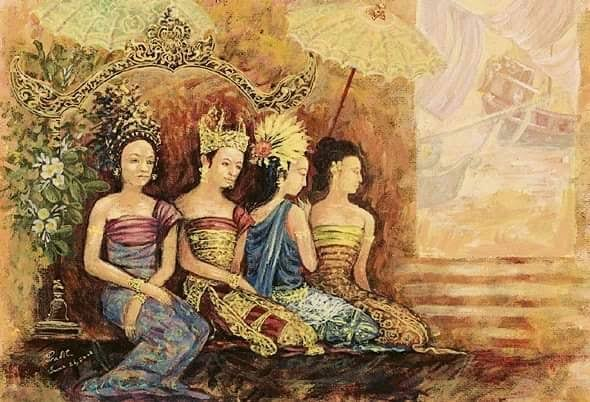
Painting depicting the four queens of Patani, Raja Hijau, Raja Biru, Raja Ungu and Raja Kuning, who ruled during the sultanate’s golden age in the late sixteenth and seventeenth centuries.

A distinctive aspect of Patani’s history is the succession of female rulers who governed the sultanate during what is often regarded as its golden age in the late sixteenth and seventeenth centuries. These rulers, celebrated in Malay and regional chronicles, include Raja Hijau (the Green Queen), Raja Biru (the Blue Queen), Raja Ungu (the Purple Queen), and Raja Kuning (the Yellow Queen). Their reigns collectively represented a period of political stability, commercial growth, and cultural refinement in the Patani Sultanate.

Under these queens, Patani achieved notable economic prosperity as a thriving port city attracting merchants from across Asia, including those from Siam, China, Japan, and the Malay Archipelago. The royal court maintained diplomatic and commercial relations with neighbouring states while fostering local industries such as kris craftsmanship, textile weaving, and the production of gunpowder weapons. These developments enhanced Patani’s reputation as both a military and cultural power in the region.

The reigns of the queens also marked a flourishing of Islamic learning and Malay literature. Scholars, poets, and craftsmen were patronised by the court, leading to a vibrant intellectual and artistic environment. This period saw the strengthening of the Malay-Muslim identity of Patani, as royal authority, religious scholarship, and mercantile enterprise became closely intertwined.

The queens’ leadership demonstrated the adaptability and inclusivity of Malay-Islamic political culture, where female sovereignty was legitimised through lineage, wisdom, and religious piety. This era of cultural florescence left a lasting legacy on Patani’s historical memory and helped shape its enduring role as a centre of Malay-Islamic civilisation in the northern Malay world.

==== Relations with Surrounding Powers: Siam, Pahang, Johor, and Others ====
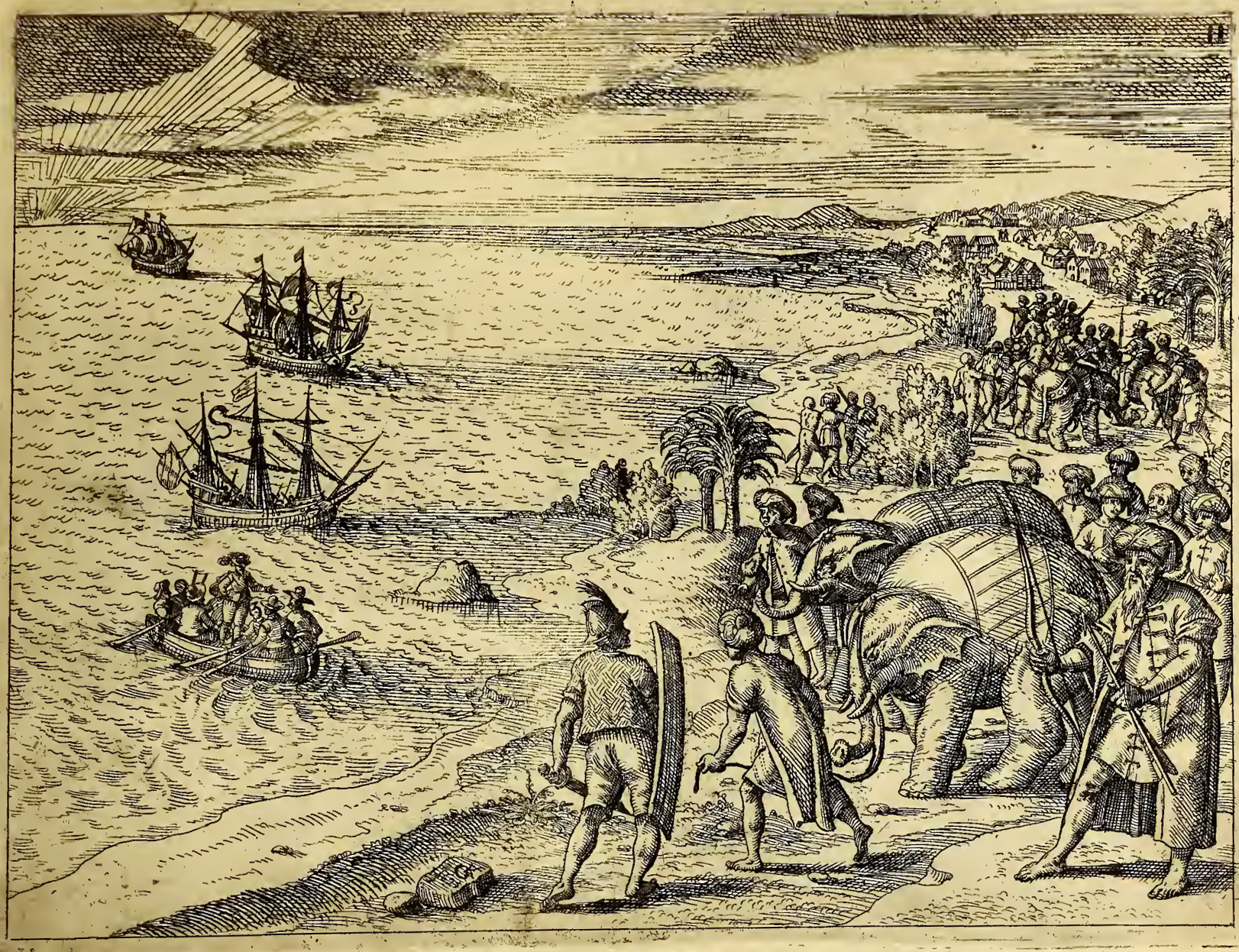
The Tweede Schipvaart arriving in Patani in 1601, showing early Dutch maritime engagement with the sultanate

Throughout its history, the Sultanate of Patani maintained a complex and shifting relationship with neighbouring powers, particularly the Siamese kingdoms of Ayutthaya and later Bangkok. Patani’s political status alternated between tributary, vassal, and semi-independent, depending on the regional balance of power. While it retained its own royal court, administrative institutions, and distinct Malay-Muslim culture, it often acknowledged Siamese suzerainty through periodic tribute missions. The most well-known symbol of this relationship was the presentation of the bunga mas dan perak (“gold and silver trees”), a ritual offering that signified Patani’s formal recognition of Siamese authority while allowing substantial internal autonomy.

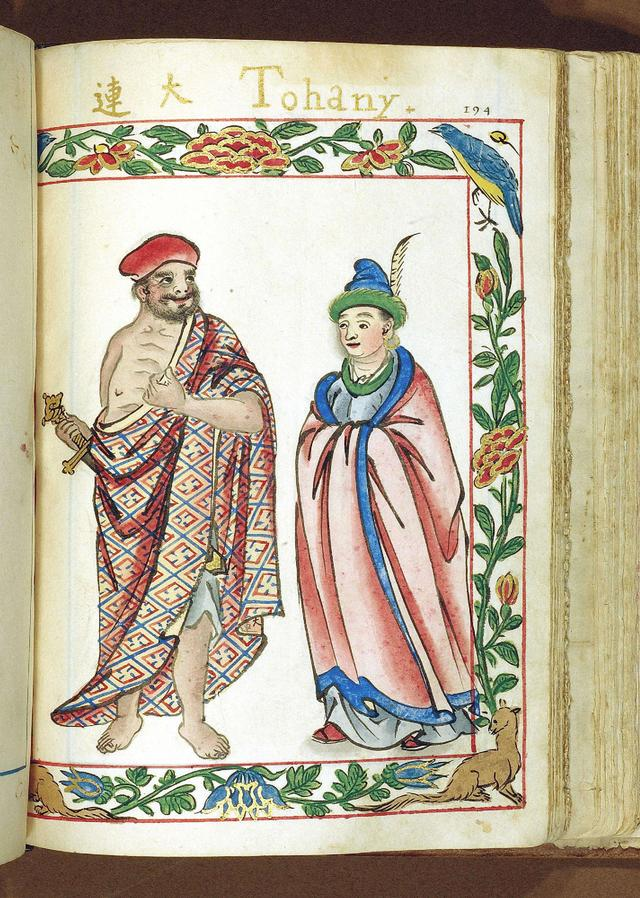
Patani couple, as depicted in the Boxer Codex (circa 1590), a Spanish‑era illustrated manuscript recording peoples of Asia.

During the early seventeenth century, under the reign of Raja Ungu, Patani adopted a more assertive stance against Siamese influence. The kingdom resisted Siamese demands and even launched a military expedition against Kedah, which was aligned with Ayutthaya. This period reflected Patani’s determination to safeguard its sovereignty and expand its influence within the northern Malay world. However, its assertiveness also contributed to fluctuating tensions with Siam that persisted for centuries.

Patani’s rulers also relied on strategic marriage alliances to strengthen regional ties. Raja Hijau (r. 1584 to 1616), the first of the four queens, married her daughter, future Raja Kuning, to Johor’s Sultan Abdul Jalil Shah III, forming a strong anti-Siamese pact despite the daughter’s previous marriage to Phatthalung’s king, Okphaya Déca, which had sparked conflict. Similarly, Raja Ungu arranged her sister’s marriage to the ruler of Pahang around 1612, reinforcing Patani’s cultural and trade connections across the Malay world. These alliances complemented the sultanate’s diplomacy and trade networks, enhancing its economic and political resilience.

Patani’s diplomacy was not limited to Siam alone. The sultanate maintained connections with Malacca, Aceh, and other Malay-Muslim polities across the archipelago, as well as with China and Japan through maritime trade. Royal intermarriages and commercial alliances helped the kingdom navigate its position between larger regional powers. These networks strengthened Patani’s economy and cultural prestige but also required delicate balancing to avoid domination by any single power. Over time, however, the growing centralization and military strength of Siam, particularly under the Bangkok court in the late eighteenth and nineteenth centuries, eroded Patani’s autonomy, gradually integrating the sultanate into Siamese administration and setting the stage for later resistance and political reorganization in the modern era.

=== Conquest, Annexation and Administration under Siam/Thailand ===
==== Conquest and Fragmentation ====
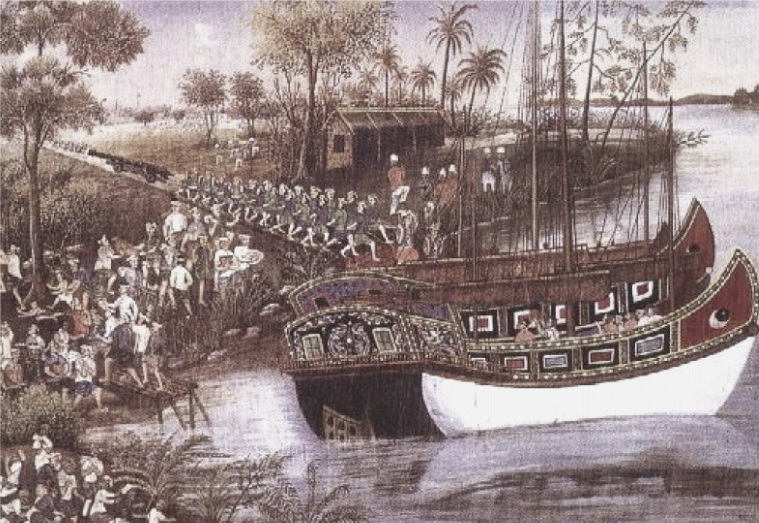
Illustration from the royal chronicle murals showing the bombardment of Patani with artillery, painted by Nai Wor around 1887 during the reign of King Chulalongkorn (Rama V).

By the late eighteenth century, the Siamese state under the newly established Chakri dynasty sought to strengthen its authority over the southern Malay polities. Following internal instability in Patani and the fall of the Ayutthaya Kingdom earlier in the century, Siam moved decisively to reassert dominance in the region. The Siamese invasion of Patani brought an end to the sultanate’s independence, marking a major turning point in the history of the Patani Malays. In 1786, King Rama I’s forces sacked the city, massacring residents and deporting many to consolidate control. Subsequent campaigns in 1789–1791, 1808, 1831–1832, and 1838 further suppressed resistance, ending Patani’s autonomous mandala system.

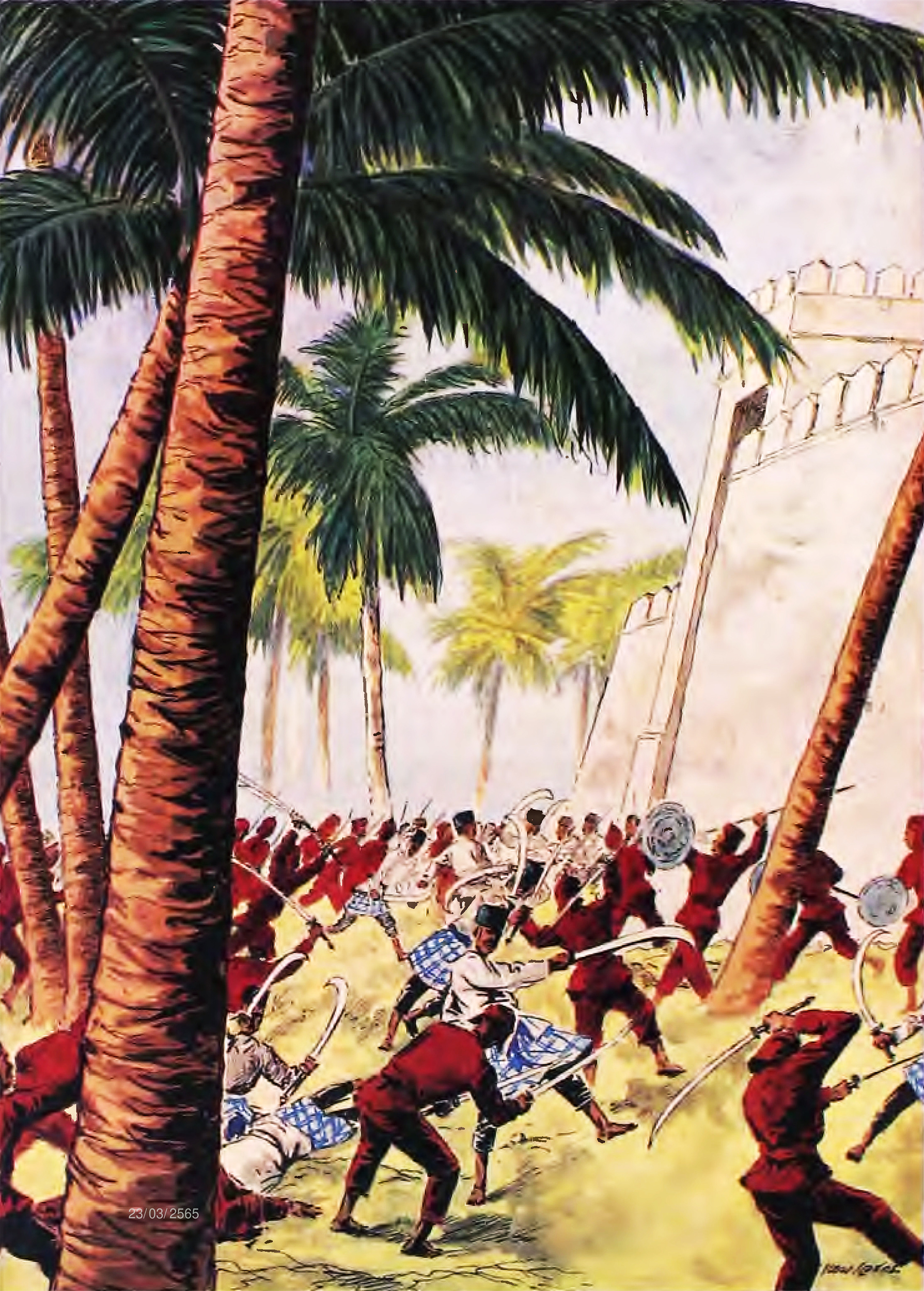
Illustration from a historical manuscript showing Chaophraya Phonlathep (Bunnak of Mae La Village) leading a Siamese army to attack Yaring in 1808–09

Patani’s coastal defenses included the massive brass siege cannon Meriam Sri Patani (also known as Phaya Tani), cast in the early seventeenth century under Queen Raja Biru to repel Siamese threats. Measuring 2.7 meters in length, it was among the largest regional cannons and symbolized Patani’s military strength. During the 1786 invasion, the cannon defended coastal forts but ultimately failed as Siamese forces advanced inland. Captured and transported to Bangkok, it became a symbol of Siamese victory, illustrating the sultanate’s military resistance and eventual subjugation.

Following the conquest, the Bangkok government introduced a policy of fragmentation and closer administrative oversight. The former sultanate was divided into several smaller mueang, including Saiburi, Yarang, Yaring, Raman, Nong Chik, and Pattani itself. Each was administered by a local ruler, mainly Malay leaders, who governed the subsequent polity entities under the suzerainty of Bangkok. This restructuring dismantled the sultanate’s political cohesion and weakened the collective identity of the Malay elite, setting the stage for ongoing tensions in the region.

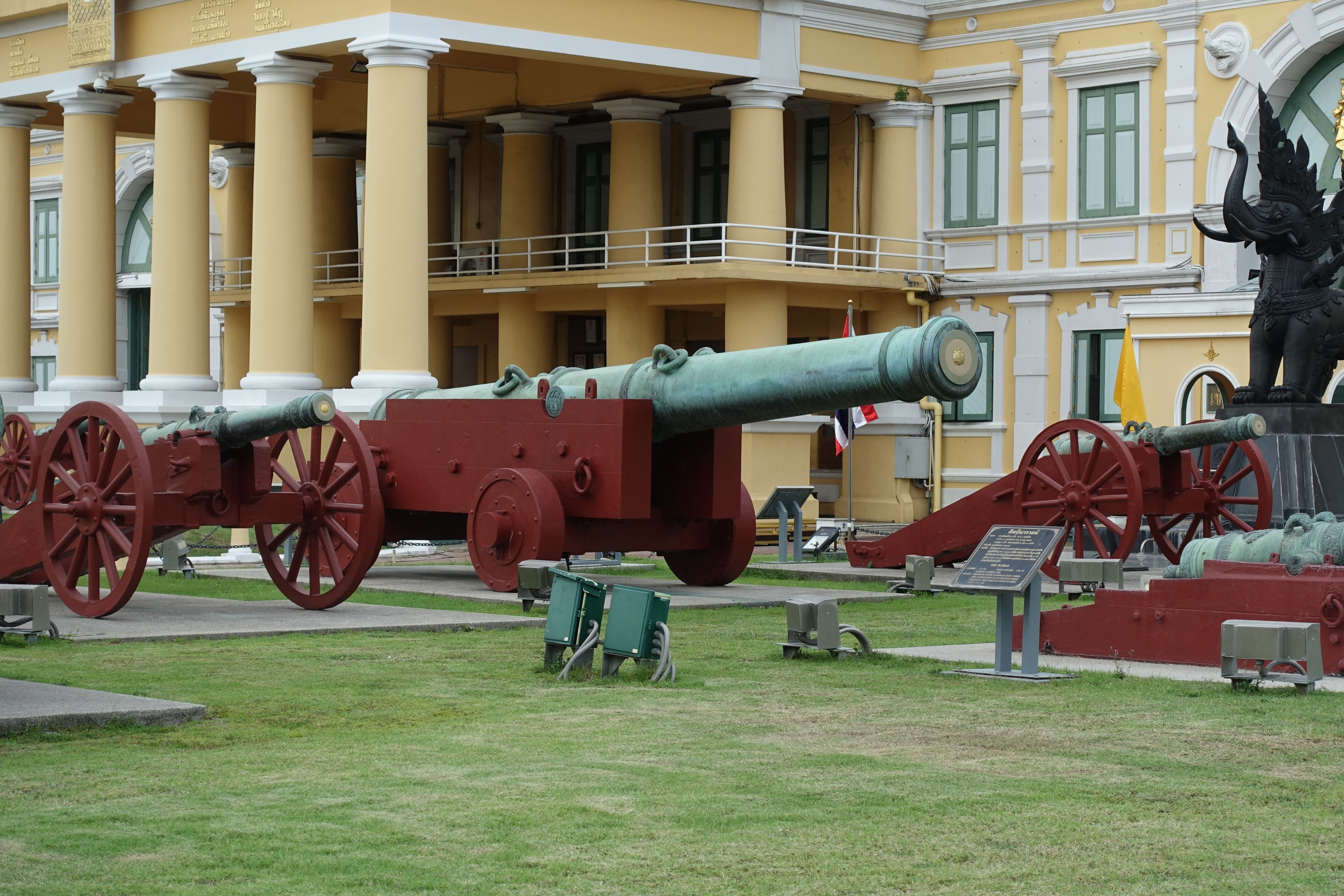
Phaya Tani cannon from the former Patani Sultanate, installed in front of the Ministry of Defence in Bangkok following its 1786 capture

The division of Patani served both strategic and political purposes. It reduced the likelihood of large-scale resistance and enabled Siam to integrate the region into its mandala system of tributary governance. According to Manan et al., this process transformed Patani from a maritime-oriented kingdom with significant regional influence into a subordinate frontier zone within the Siamese sphere. While local rulers retained limited authority over religious and cultural affairs, ultimate power rested with Bangkok’s appointed governors and military officials.

This fragmentation reduced the political unity of the Patani Malays and reshaped the region’s administrative structure. Nevertheless, Islamic institutions and communal traditions continued to function within local society and remained important elements of cultural and religious life during the subsequent centuries of Siamese and later Thai rule. As part of these measures, many Patani residents were deported by Siamese forces under King Rama I following the 1786 conquest, with further relocations occurring during campaigns in 1789–1791, 1808, 1831–1832, and 1838. Resettled in Bangkok and other central regions, these communities became the nucleus of the Bangkok Malay community, preserving their language, Islamic faith, and cultural traditions within the Siamese heartland.

==== Anglo-Siamese Treaty (1909) and Boundary Demarcation ====
Map of southern Siam and northern British Malaya around 1900, showing the former Patani Sultanate divided into smaller Malay polities including Saiburi, Yarang, Yaring, Raman, Nong Chik, and Pattani.

A major turning point in the modern history of Patani occurred with the signing of the Anglo-Siamese Treaty of 1909 between the Kingdom of Siam and Great Britain. The treaty formally established the boundary between Siam and British Malaya, transforming longstanding spheres of influence into a fixed international border. Under the terms of the agreement, the Siamese government retained sovereignty over Patani and other southern territories, while the adjacent Malay states of Kelantan, Terengganu, Kedah, and Perlis were incorporated into the British colonial administration of Malaya.

This demarcation had profound political and cultural consequences. It divided the historical Malay world of the northern peninsula, separating the Patani Malays from their ethnic, linguistic, and religious kin across the new frontier. Communities that had shared centuries of familial, commercial, and religious ties suddenly found themselves under different political systems and colonial administrations.

Within Siam, the incorporation of Patani marked the beginning of a more direct and centralized form of governance. The region was gradually integrated into the Siamese state through administrative reforms and the introduction of a modern bureaucratic system. For the Patani Malays, however, the new border redefined their identity from members of a Malay-Muslim polity to a minority group within the emerging Thai nation-state.

=== Modern Era: Cultural, Social and Political Dynamics ===
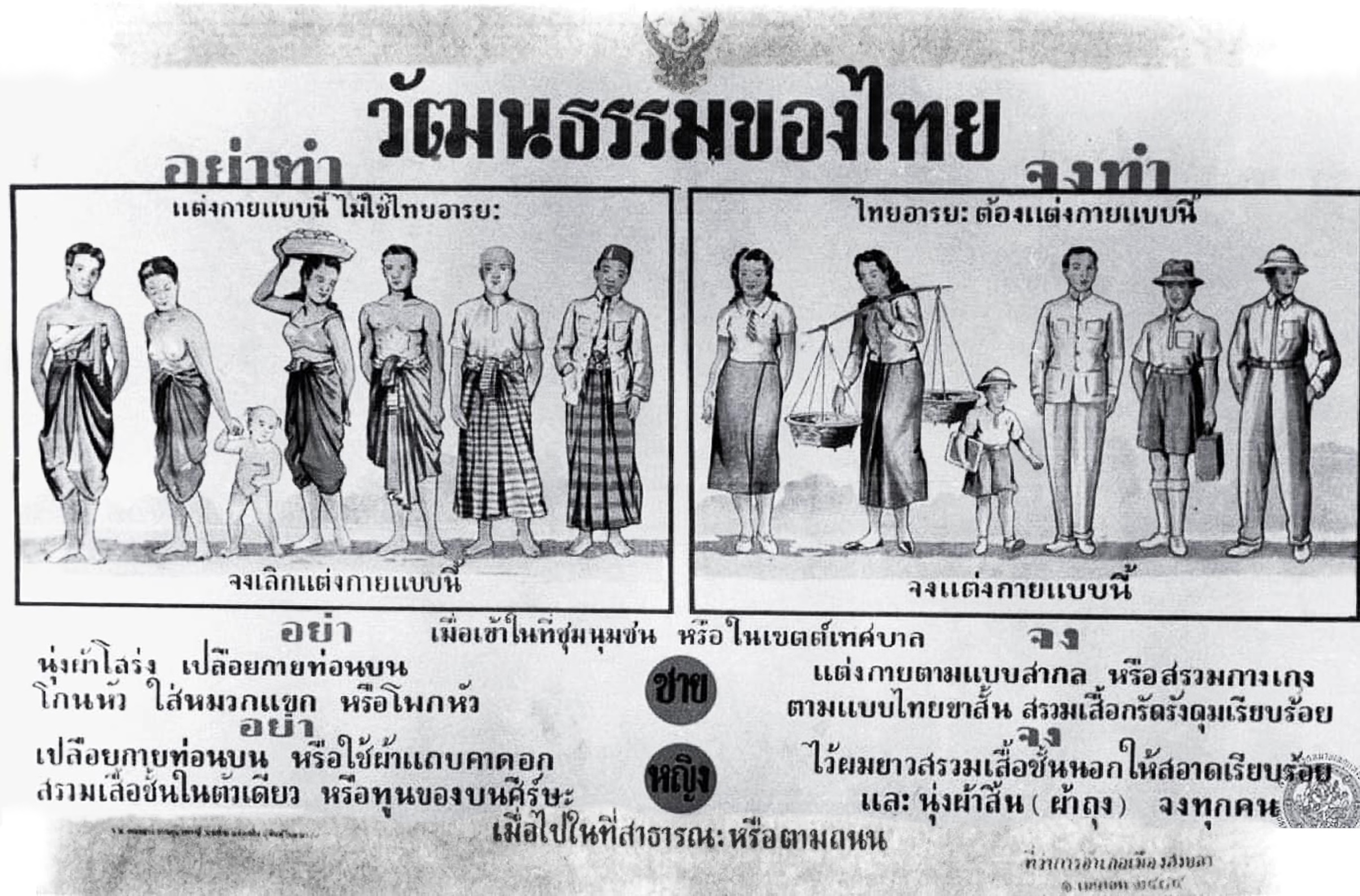
Thai cultural mandate dress code enforced during the administration of Field Marshal Plaek Phibunsongkhram around 1940, part of national integration and Thaification policies

==== Early Centralization and Cultural Policies ====
Following the Anglo-Siamese Treaty of 1909, the Thai state undertook a series of measures to consolidate control over its southern provinces, including Patani. During the early twentieth century, successive governments in Bangkok pursued policies aimed at centralization and national integration, which sought to bring the ethnically and culturally diverse regions of the kingdom under a unified administrative and ideological framework.

Under the reforms of King Chulalongkorn (Rama V) and his successors, the former Malay territories were incorporated into the Monthon system, a modern administrative structure that replaced older semi-autonomous arrangements. Local rulers in Patani and surrounding districts were gradually displaced or absorbed into the state bureaucracy, marking the end of hereditary Malay leadership.

During the early twentieth century, the former Patani sultanate and its successor polities, including Saiburi, Raman, Nong Chik, Yaring, and Yarang, were reorganised under the Siamese provincial administration. By the 1930s, these territories had been consolidated into the modern provinces of Pattani, Yala, and Narathiwat, which constitute the core of Thailand’s current southern border provinces.

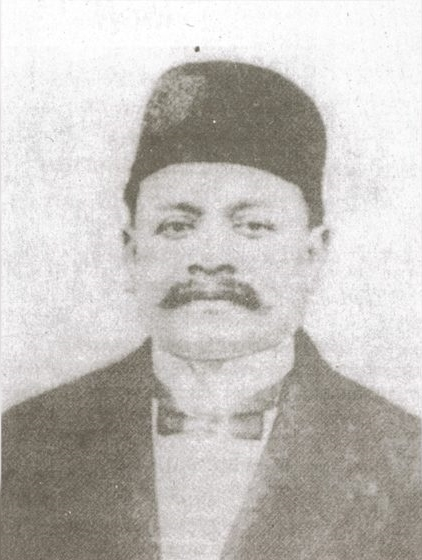
Abdul Kadir Kamaruddin

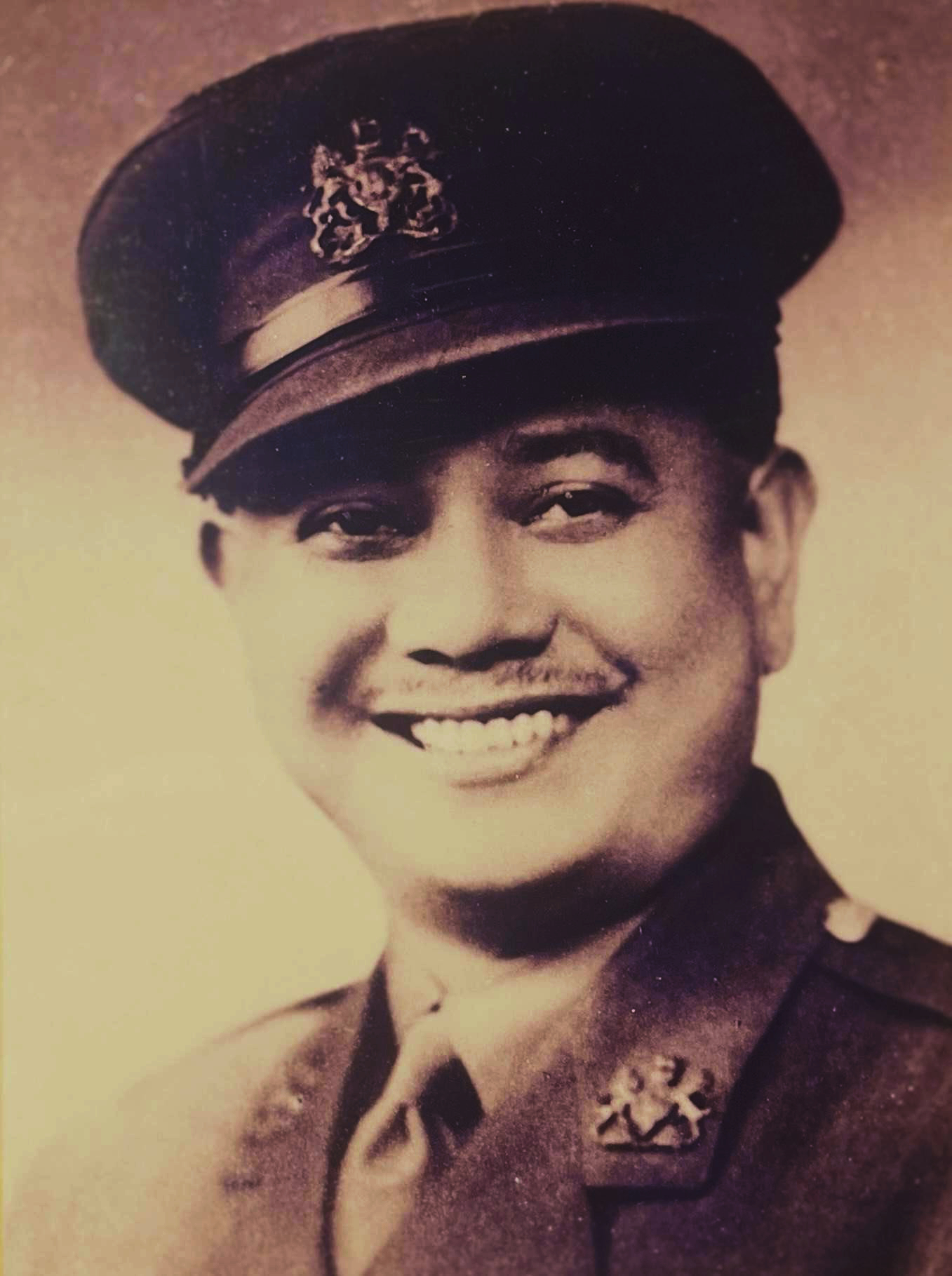
Tengku Mahmood Mahyideen

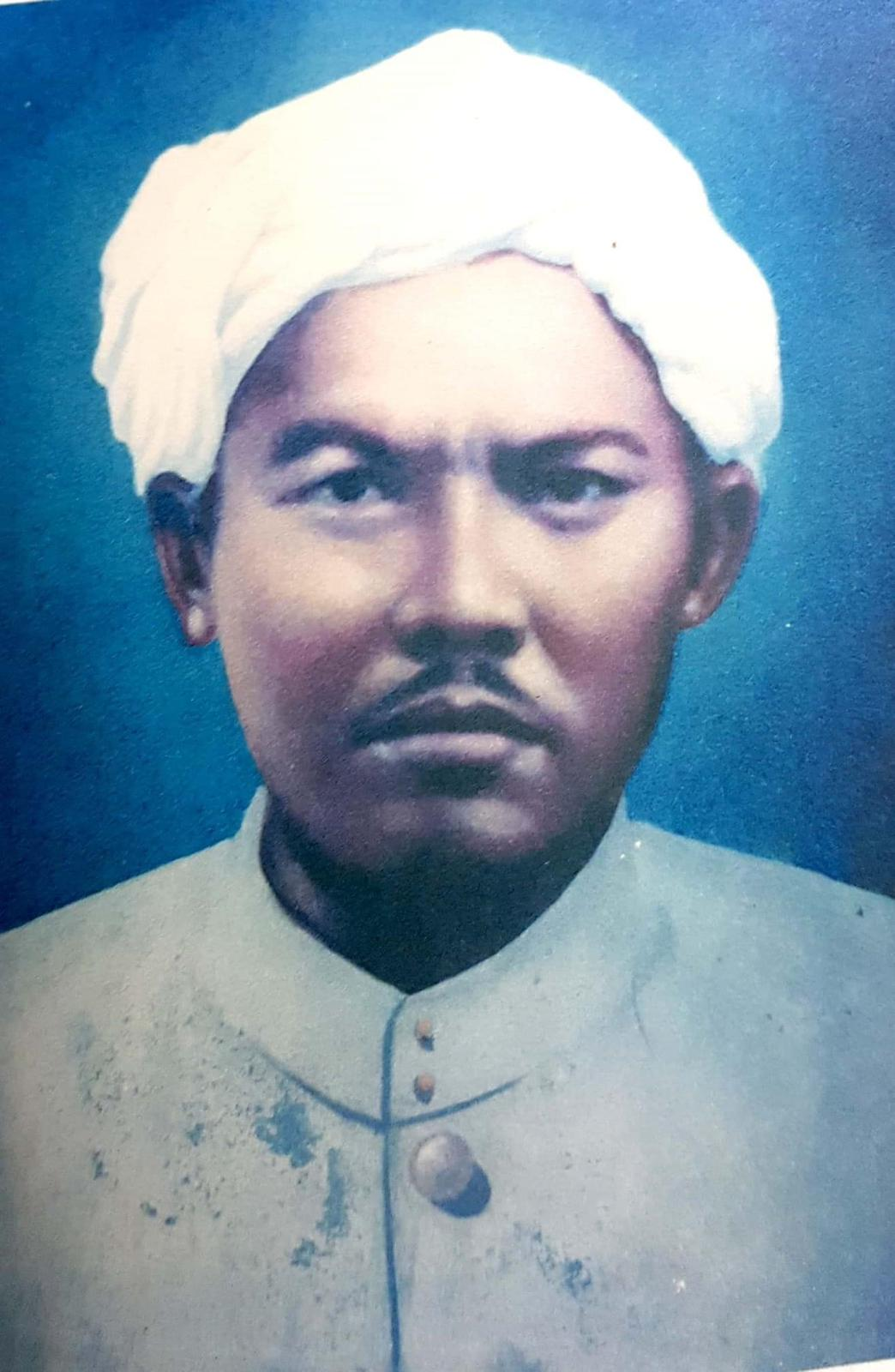
Haji Abdul Majid Embong

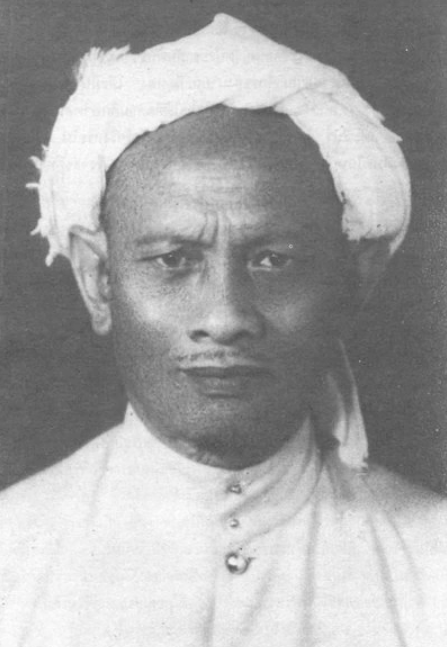
Haji Sulong

Prominent Malay-Muslim leaders associated with political and religious movements in Patani in the 20th century.

Throughout the twentieth century, successive governments in Bangkok pursued policies aimed at national integration and centralization. These efforts, often described as Thaification, sought to unify the kingdom’s ethnically and culturally diverse regions under a common administrative and ideological framework. Thai was promoted as the primary language of education and administration, while the use of Malay in official settings was increasingly restricted. State-directed curricula emphasized Thai history, language, and national identity. Islamic institutions were also brought under closer government supervision, integrating religious education and legal practices into the broader state framework.

Nationalist policies intensified during the administration of Field Marshal Plaek Phibunsongkhram (1938–1944; 1948–1957). His government promoted a conception of Thai identity centered on loyalty to the nation, monarchy, and Buddhism, reinforcing cultural mandates designed to standardize dress, language, and social behavior across the country. Although framed as modernization and national unity initiatives, these measures were perceived by many Patani Malays as efforts to erode their distinct Malay-Muslim identity.

While these policies aimed to modernize and unify the country, they also generated deep cultural and religious discontent among the Patani Malays. The community’s attachment to Islamic institutions, Malay language, and local adat (customary law) often clashed with the central government’s assimilationist agenda. By the 1930s and 1940s, tensions between local leaders and Thai authorities had become increasingly evident, setting the stage for organized political resistance.

==== Resistance, Separatist Movements, and Modern Challenges ====
Flag of the Barisan Revolusi Nasional (Koordinasi)

Flag of Patani Malays People's Consultative Council

During the Second World War, some Patani leaders sought external support for greater autonomy. Tengku Mahmood Mahyideen reportedly approached British authorities regarding the possibility of establishing an independent Patani state; however, Britain declined to support such proposals, prioritizing regional stability. In the postwar period, Haji Sulong bin Abdul Kadir al-Fatani emerged as a prominent advocate for greater recognition of Malay language, Islamic law, and regional administrative autonomy. In 1947, he submitted a petition outlining demands for local self-governance and the application of Islamic legal principles in the southern provinces. He was later arrested on charges of treason, and his disappearance in 1954 became a significant and contested episode in the region’s modern history.

By the 1960s, resistance had become more organized with the emergence of groups such as the Barisan Revolusi Nasional (BRN), the Barisan Nasional Pembebasan Patani (BNPP), and the Patani United Liberation Organisation (PULO). These organizations variously advocated greater autonomy or independence and pursued a combination of political mobilization and armed resistance. Other movements, including Gabungan Melayu Pattani Raya (GAMPAR), emphasized the interconnection between Malay ethnic identity and Islamic solidarity.

The Thai government’s response alternated between security operations and limited political accommodation, depending on broader national conditions. Development programs, security operations, and state-sponsored religious initiatives were introduced to stabilize the region, though underlying grievances often persisted. Despite periodic violence, most Patani Malays continued to identify strongly with both their Islamic faith and Malay heritage, even as they adapted to the realities of citizenship within the modern Thai nation-state. Despite these efforts, grievances related to cultural recognition, economic disparities, and political representation persisted.

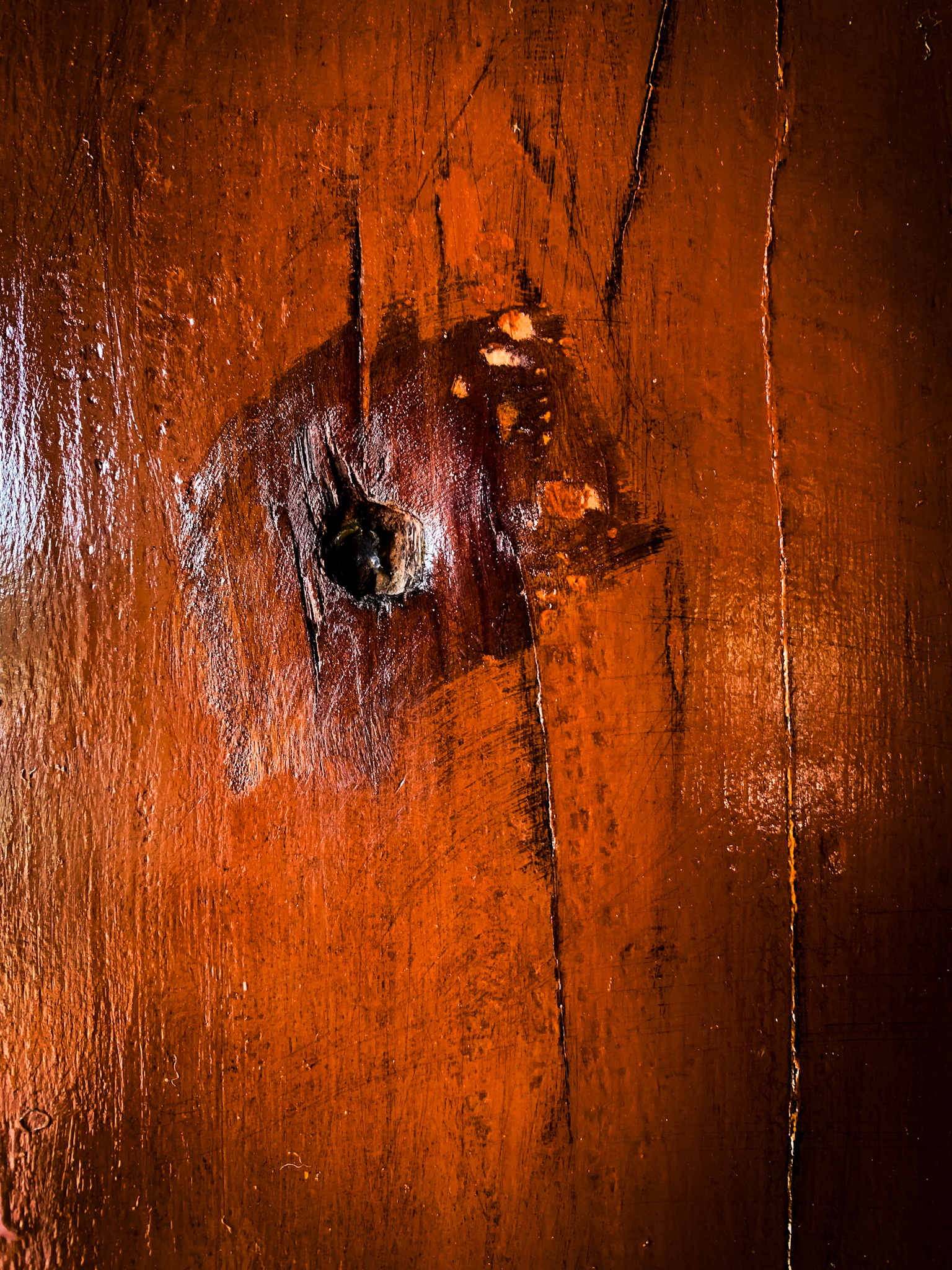
Door panel at Krue Se Mosque with bullet marks from the 2004 incident.

In the early twenty-first century, violence in southern Thailand escalated in periodic waves, drawing renewed attention to longstanding issues of identity, governance, and regional autonomy. Several insurgent organisations have been involved in the conflict, most notably the Barisan Revolusi Nasional (BRN), alongside earlier movements such as the Patani United Liberation Organisation (PULO) and the Gerakan Mujahideen Islam Pattani (GMIP). Various peace initiatives have been undertaken by the Thai government and regional mediators, though tensions continue.

Several high-profile incidents during the early 2000s intensified tensions in the region. In 2004, security forces stormed the historic Krue Se Mosque during clashes with militants in what became known as the Krue Se Mosque incident. Later that year, a protest in Narathiwat province led to the deaths of dozens of detainees following their arrest by security forces in the Tak Bai incident. These events drew significant domestic and international attention and are often cited as major turning points in the escalation of violence in southern Thailand.

==== Patani Malays in Contemporary Thailand ====
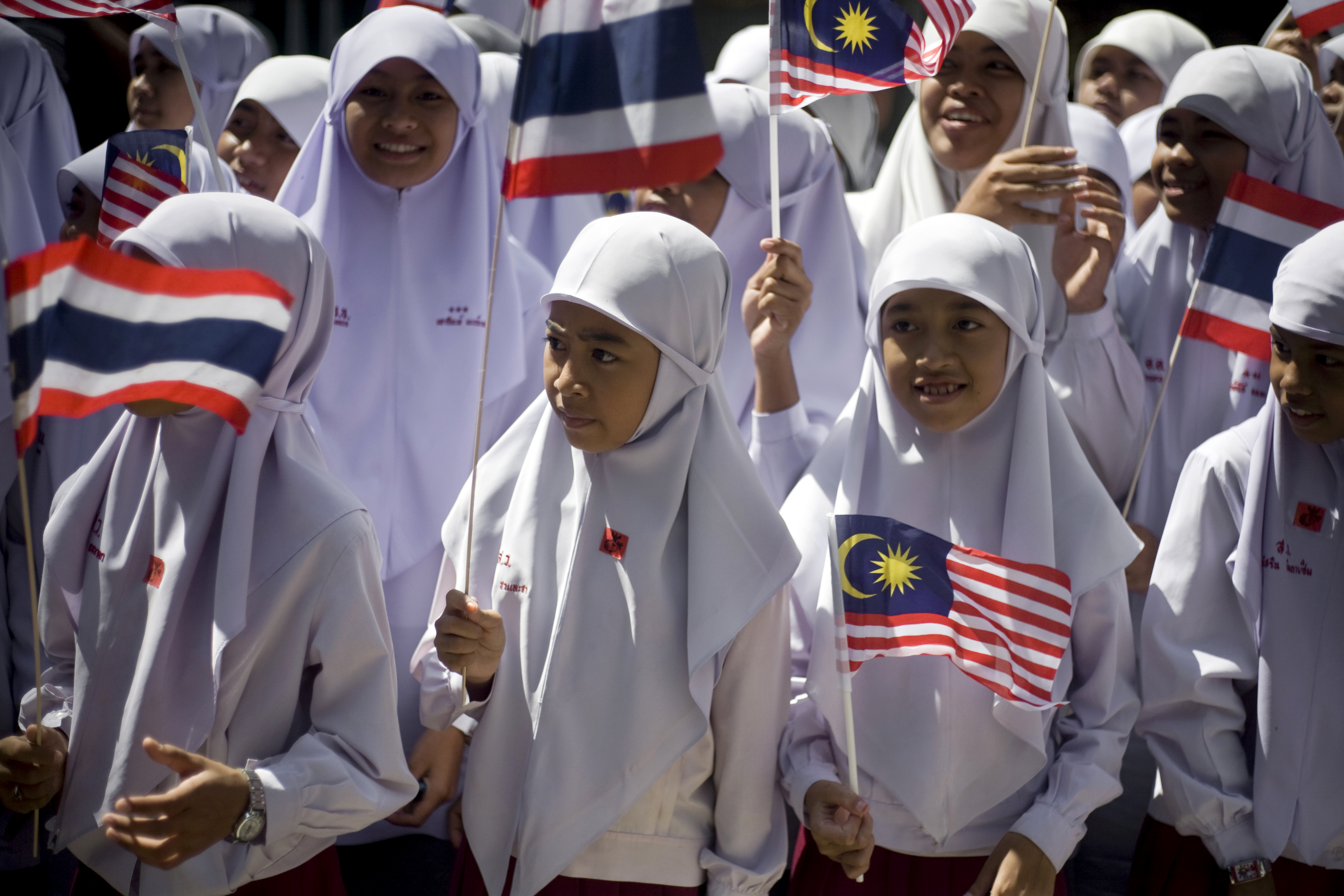
The Prime Minister visiting the dual-curriculum school at Attarkiyah Islamiyah School, Narathiwat Province

Despite these tensions and more than a century of administrative integration following the Anglo-Siamese Treaty of 1909, the Patani Malays have retained a distinct cultural identity within Thailand. Their identity continues to be expressed through the Malay language, adherence to Islam, and historical memory of the former Patani Sultanate, which remain important markers of community life in the predominantly Thai-speaking and Buddhist context of southern Thailand.

In response to longstanding tensions in the southern border provinces, successive Thai governments have implemented initiatives aimed at promoting stability and dialogue. These have included development programs, administrative reforms coordinated through the Southern Border Provinces Administrative Centre, and periodic peace dialogue processes with representatives linked to the Barisan Revolusi Nasional. Policies have also sought to accommodate aspects of Malay-Muslim cultural life, including support for Islamic education and the continued role of provincial Islamic councils in matters of religious administration.

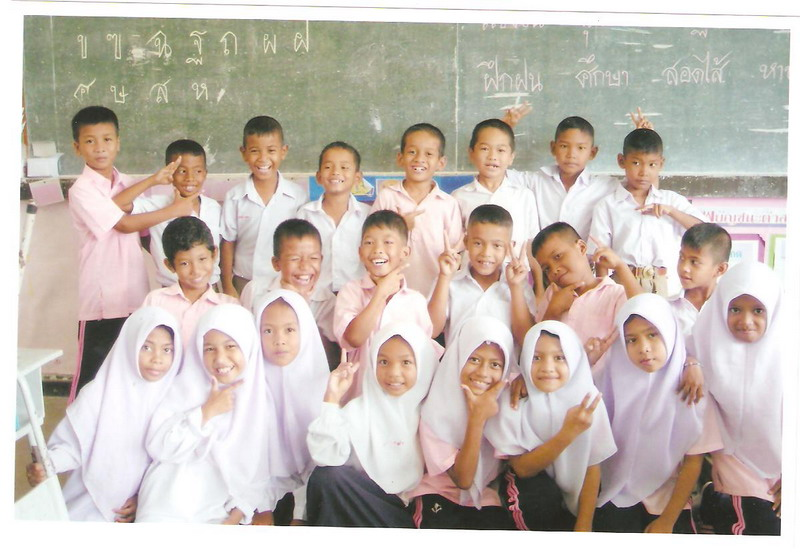
Students attending school in Thailand’s three southern border provinces.

Within this context, cultural and religious practices continue to shape everyday Patani Malay life. The use of the Malay language, observance of Islamic customs, and continuation of local traditions help maintain a distinct cultural profile, reflecting the community’s heritage within the broader Thai society. Language remains a key medium of communication in homes, villages, and markets, while religious institutions such as pondok and tadika schools provide spaces for transmitting Islamic knowledge and communal values. Traditional crafts, performing arts, and literature also persist as important expressions of cultural identity, with local initiatives and cross-border networks supporting their continuation.

Younger Patani Malays increasingly navigate hybrid identities, participating in Thai national life through education, media, and civil service, while maintaining ties to their heritage. Social media and digital platforms have become powerful tools for cultural expression, allowing the community to present Patani Malay language, fashion, and cuisine to broader audiences.

== Patani Malay culture ==
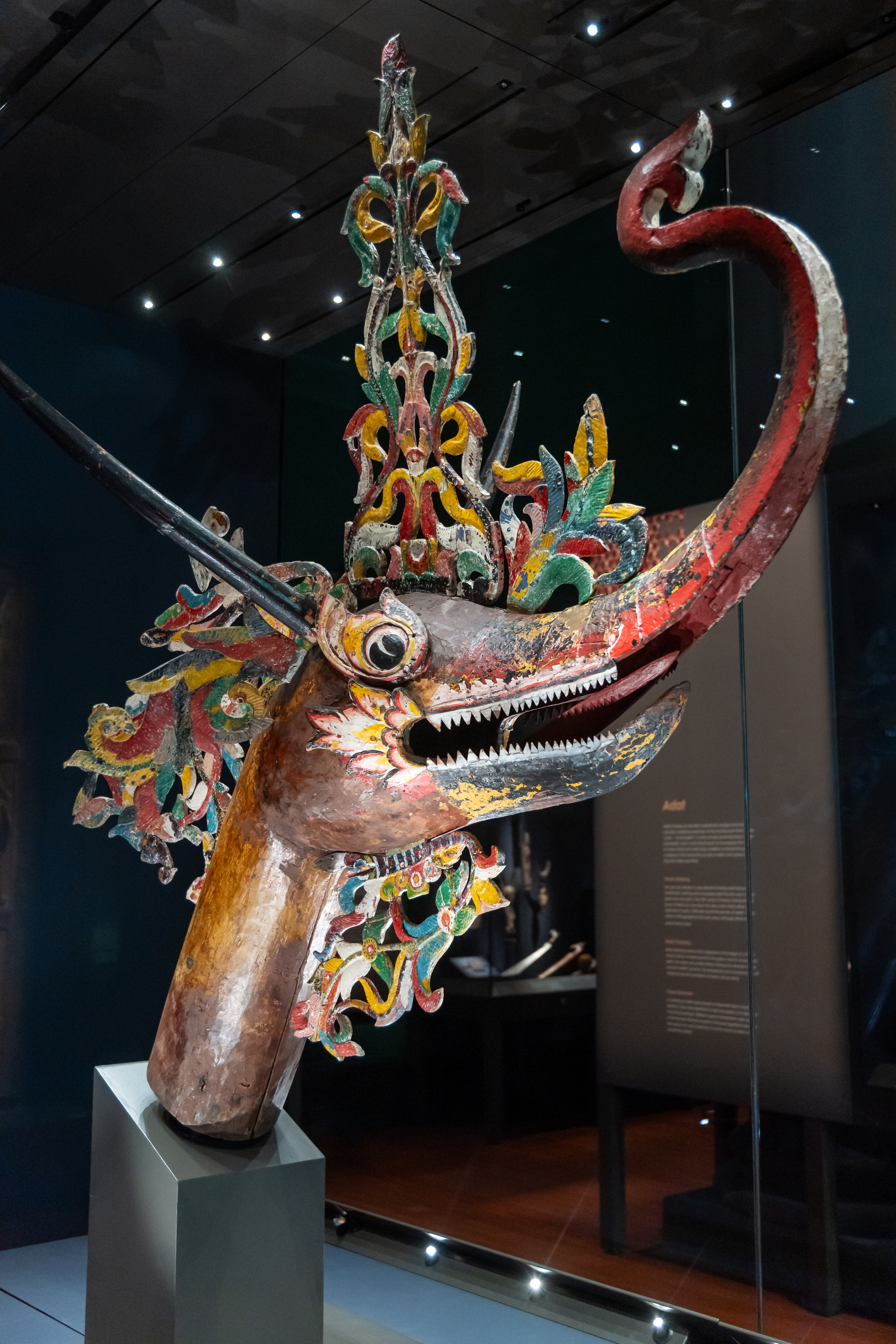
Makara palanquin ornament from Patani, in the collection of the Asian Civilisations Museum, Singapore

Patani Malay culture refers to the distinctive Malay Islamic cultural tradition of the Patani Malays of southern Thailand. Rooted in the historical legacy of the Patani Sultanate and shaped by centuries of maritime trade, Islamic scholarship, and long contact with neighbouring Thai, Chinese, and wider Malay worlds, it forms part of the broader Kelantan Patani cultural sphere of the northern Malay world.

The culture is characterised by the use of the Patani Malay dialect, historically written in Jawi script; the central role of Islam and the pondok religious education system; a rich corpus of classical literature such as the Hikayat Patani and Tarikh Fathani; and diverse artistic expressions including woodcarving, kris craftsmanship, Mak Yong performance, and songket weaving. Culinary traditions, social organisation based on kinship and mosque networks, and adherence to adat or customary law further define community life.

While integrated within the modern Thai nation state following the Anglo-Siamese Treaty, Patani Malay culture retains a distinct linguistic, religious, and historical identity. Contemporary cultural revival efforts, ranging from language preservation and craft revitalisation to digital media expression, reflect ongoing processes of adaptation and continuity within a changing social and political context.

=== Language ===
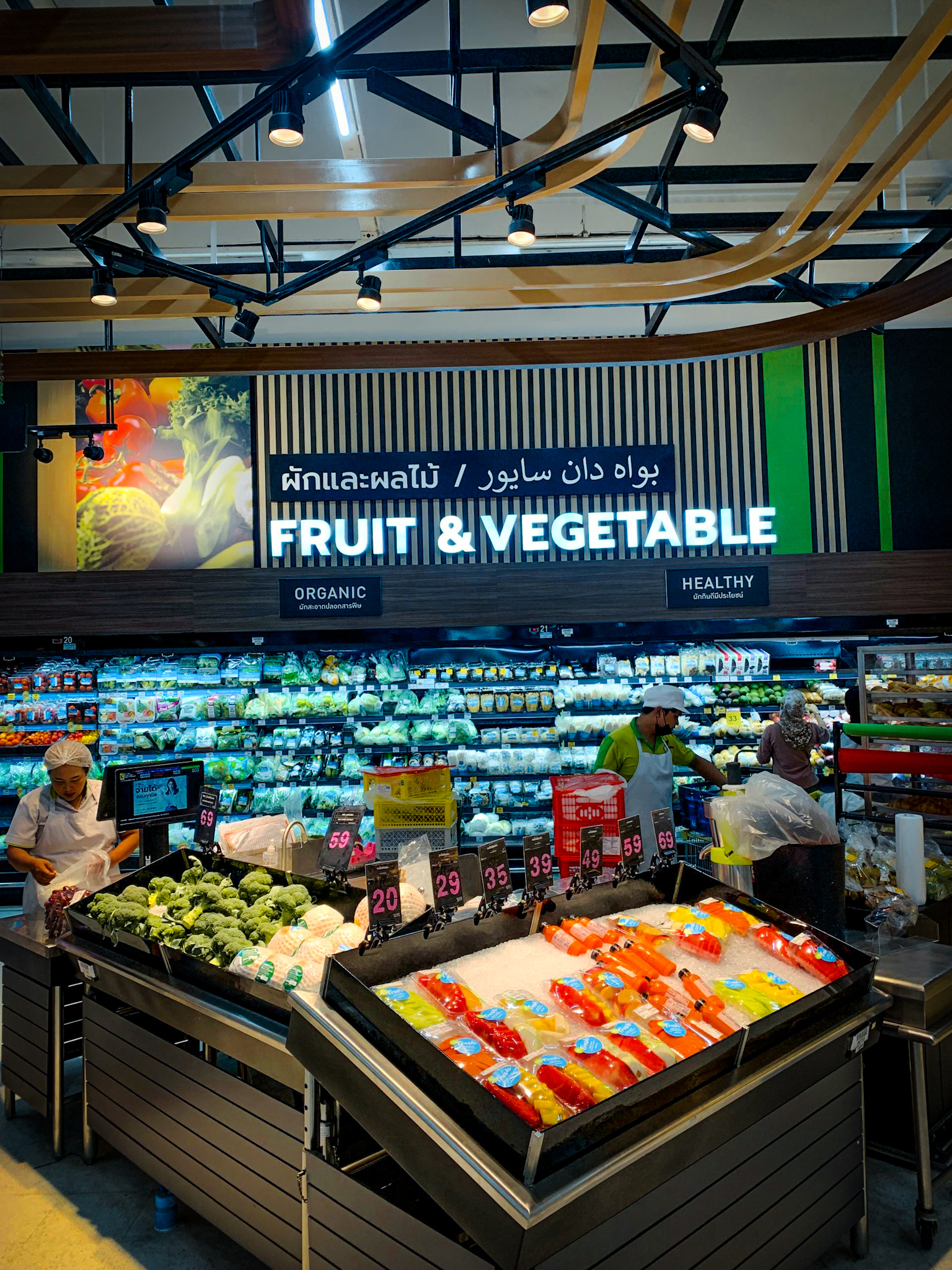
Multilingual signboard at Big C hypermarket in Pattani, displaying Malay in Jawi script alongside Thai and English.

Patani Malay (locally known as Bahasa Melayu Patani or Bahasa Jawi Patani) forms part of the Kelantan–Patani dialect continuum, which extends across the modern Thai–Malaysian border. Linguistically, it is classified within the Malayic branch of the Austronesian language family, but is highly divergent from Standard Malay (Bahasa Melayu or Bahasa Malaysia) due to centuries of relative geographic isolation and sustained contact with Thai and, to a lesser extent, Chinese languages.

The dialect functions as the primary spoken language of the Patani Malay community and serves as a key symbol of ethnic and cultural identity. It retains many archaic Malay lexical and phonological features, while also incorporating loanwords and phonetic shifts influenced by Thai. Despite increasing Thai-language influence through education and media, Patani Malay remains robust in informal, familial, and community settings.

In written form, Patani Malay historically used the Jawi script, an adapted Arabic alphabet that was central to Islamic learning and Malay literature in the region. While the Thai script has been introduced for administrative and educational purposes, Jawi continues to hold religious, cultural, and symbolic significance, particularly in Quranic schools (pondok), mosques, and traditional literary texts.

=== Literature and Historical Texts ===
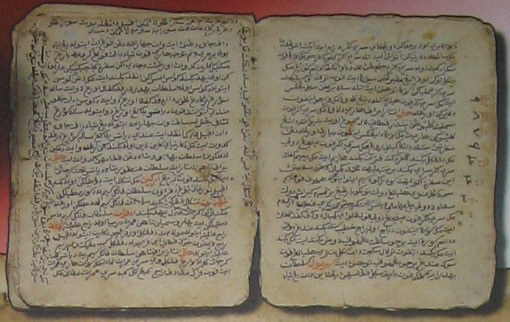
A manuscript of Hikayat Patani

Classical Malay literature from Patani constitutes a vital component of the region’s historical memory and intellectual heritage. Among the most prominent works are the Hikayat Patani and the Kitab Tarikh Fathani (also known as Tarikh Fathani), both of which serve as foundational narratives for understanding the political, religious, and cultural evolution of the Patani Malay world.

The Hikayat Patani, written in classical Malay prose, chronicles the genealogy of the Patani rulers, key political events, and legendary episodes that blend court history with mythic and moral themes. It offers insight into royal rituals, diplomatic relations, and the early Islamisation of the kingdom, reflecting the worldview of a Malay-Muslim court embedded within wider Southeast Asian networks.

The Tarikh Fathani, meanwhile, represents a more explicitly Islamic historiographical tradition, emphasizing religious scholarship, the arrival of Islam, and the role of local ulama (religious scholars) in shaping regional identity. Together, these texts exemplify the syncretic nature of Malay historiography, where oral tradition, Islamic didacticism, and political legitimation intersect.

=== Education and religion ===
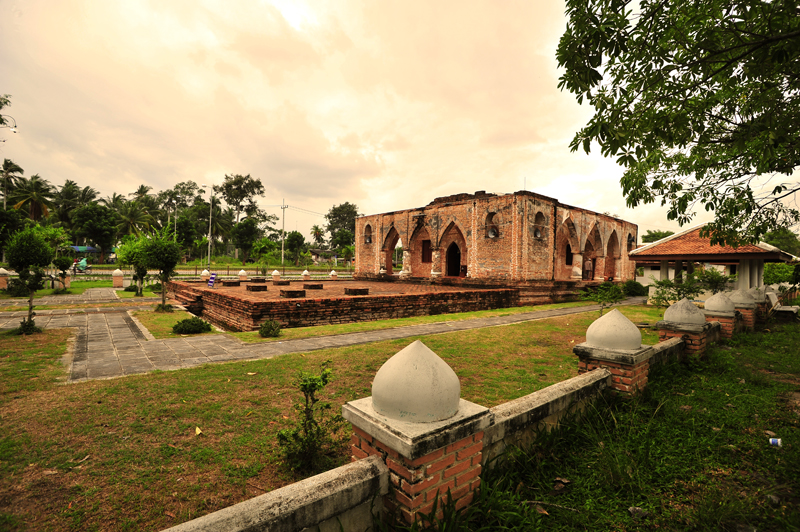
Krue Se Mosque in Pattani, an early historic mosque associated with the spread of Islam in the Patani region.

The Islamic faith lies at the heart of Patani Malay cultural and social life, shaping local values, education, and community organisation. Religious learning has traditionally been centred on the pondok system, informal Islamic boarding schools that have served for centuries as focal institutions for education, moral development, and the transmission of religious knowledge.

The term pondok (from the Arabic funduq, meaning “inn” or “lodging”) refers to the simple huts or dormitories where students reside while studying under a tok guru (religious teacher). These schools provide instruction primarily in Qurʾanic recitation, Islamic jurisprudence (fiqh), theology, Arabic grammar, and moral discipline, often through classical Malay and Arabic texts.

From the nineteenth to early twentieth centuries, Patani emerged as a major centre of Islamic learning in the Malay world, attracting students from Kelantan, Terengganu, Sumatra, and Java, as well as returning scholars who had studied in Mecca and Cairo. The region produced a number of influential ulama whose works circulated widely, linking Patani to broader intellectual and reformist currents in the Muslim world.

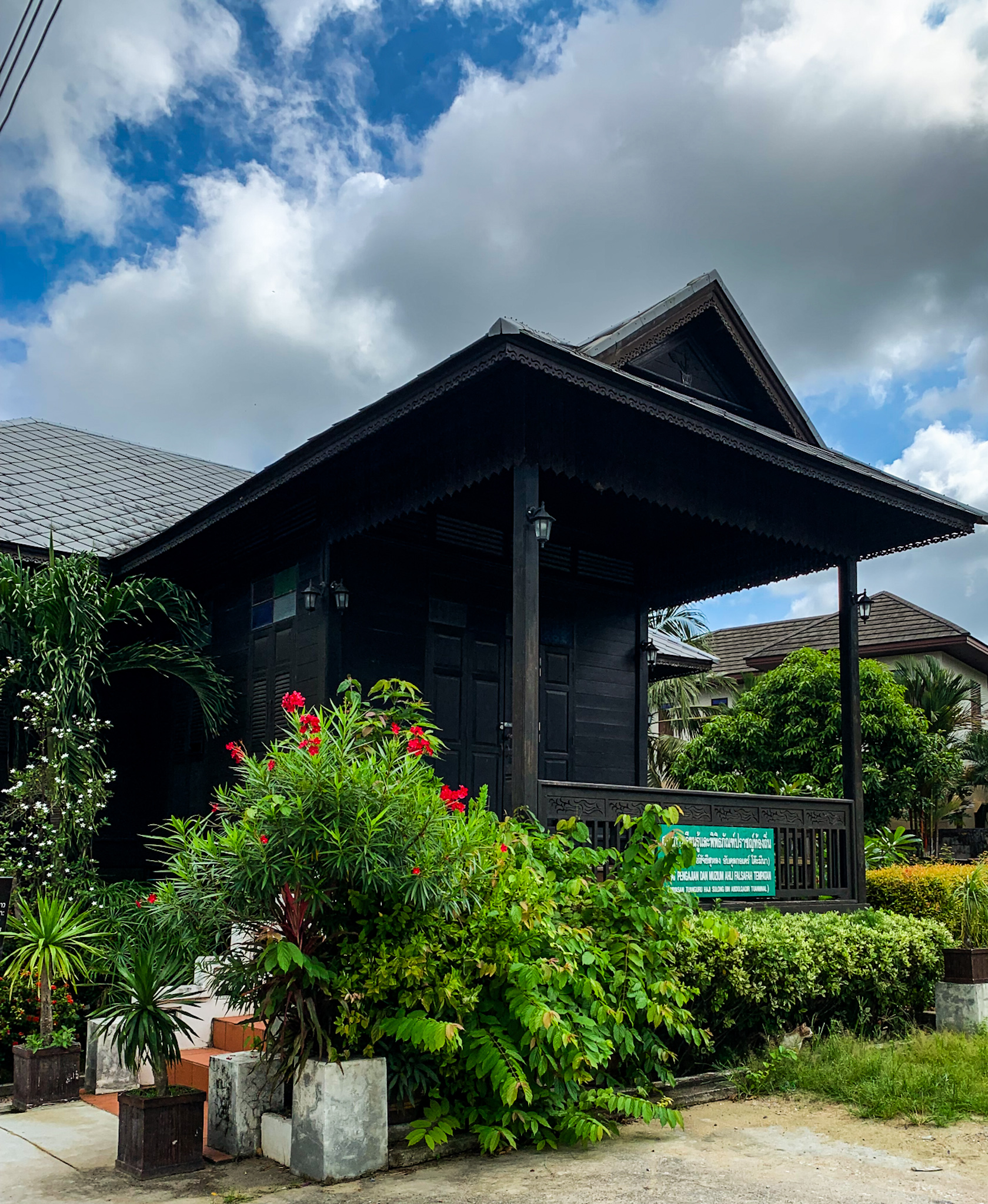
Haji Sulong Residence, converted into a study centre and museum dedicated to the life and thought of Haji Sulong Abdul Kadir.

In the present day, pondok institutions continue to operate across Patani, although their role has evolved alongside the expansion of formal education. Some remain largely traditional in organisation and curriculum, while others incorporate elements of structured schooling or operate alongside state-recognised systems. They remain closely associated with local religious authority and the teaching of classical Islamic texts.

In addition to pondok, madrasah provide a more formalised form of religious schooling. Unlike pondok, which are typically centred on a tok guru and operate without fixed grades or a structured timetable, madrasah follow a school-based system with organised classes, levels, and examinations. Their curriculum generally combines religious subjects with elements of formal education.

At the village level, children commonly receive early religious instruction through tadika classes, usually held in mosques or surau outside regular school hours. These classes introduce Qurʾanic reading, basic Islamic teachings, and moral instruction, and are typically organised by local communities.

Alongside these religious institutions, most Patani Malay children also attend national schools under the Thai education system, where instruction is conducted primarily in Thai and follows a standardised secular curriculum. Religious instruction within national schools is limited in scope and is commonly supplemented by religious education outside regular school hours.

=== Arts, Crafts, and Material Culture ===
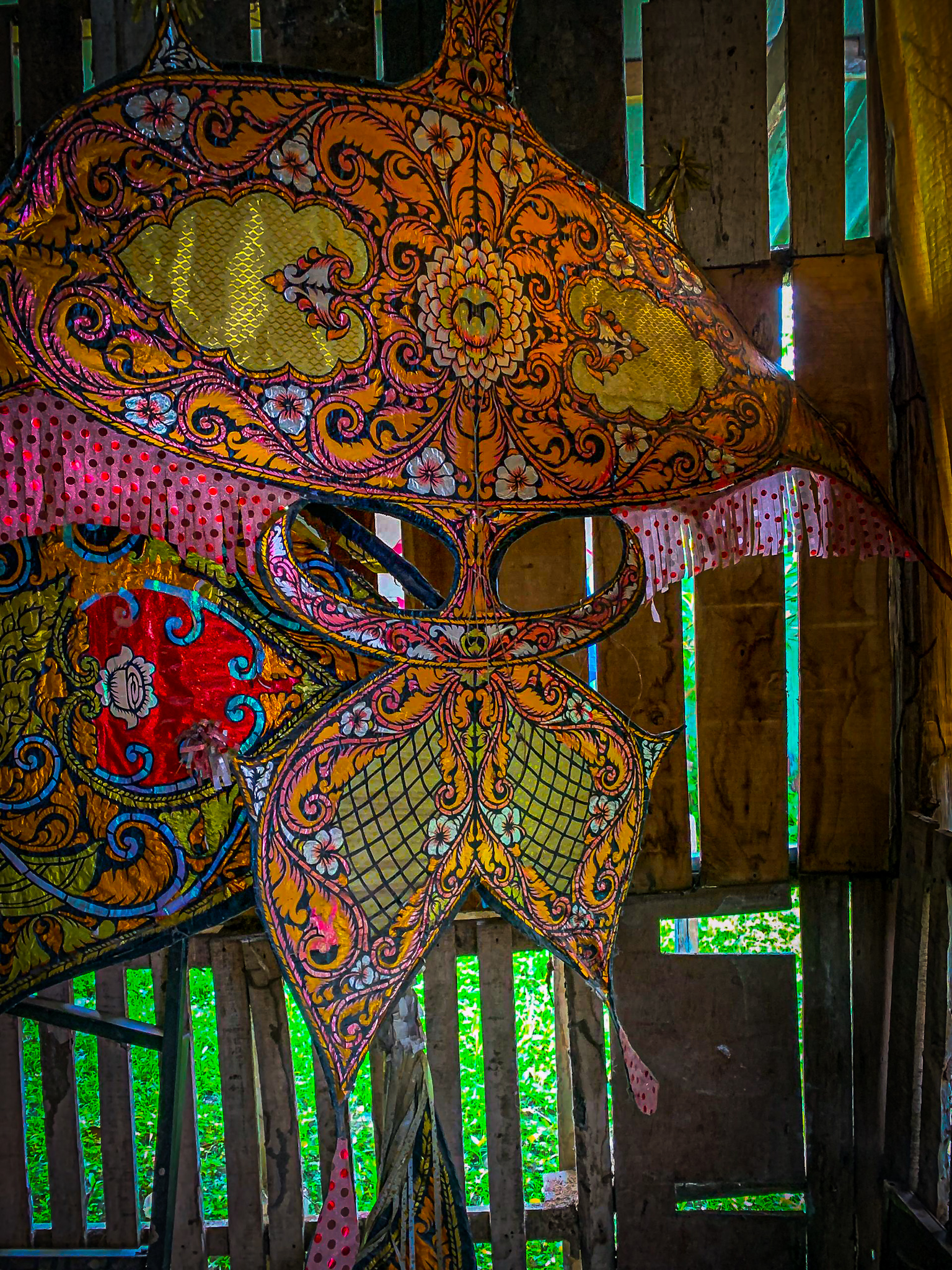
Wau beramas, a traditional kite

The Patani Malays possess a long and distinguished heritage of craftsmanship and performing arts, reflecting both their integration into the wider Malay cultural world (Alam Melayu) and their distinctive local adaptations. Historically, Patani was a major centre of artisanal production, renowned for its kris (keris), a finely forged asymmetrical dagger that served as both a weapon and a symbol of status and identity. Patani smiths were also skilled in the production of brassware, jewelry, woven textiles, and batik fabrics, which were traded widely across the Malay Peninsula, Sumatra, and Java.

Artisans traditionally drew inspiration from Islamic aesthetics, incorporating floral, vegetal, and geometric motifs that symbolised beauty within the framework of religious decorum. Woodcarving and metal engraving, used to adorn houses, mosques, and ceremonial objects, are especially valued for their refinement and symbolic resonance. These crafts continue to be practiced, often supported by cultural preservation initiatives and cross-border collaborations with artisans in Kelantan and Terengganu.

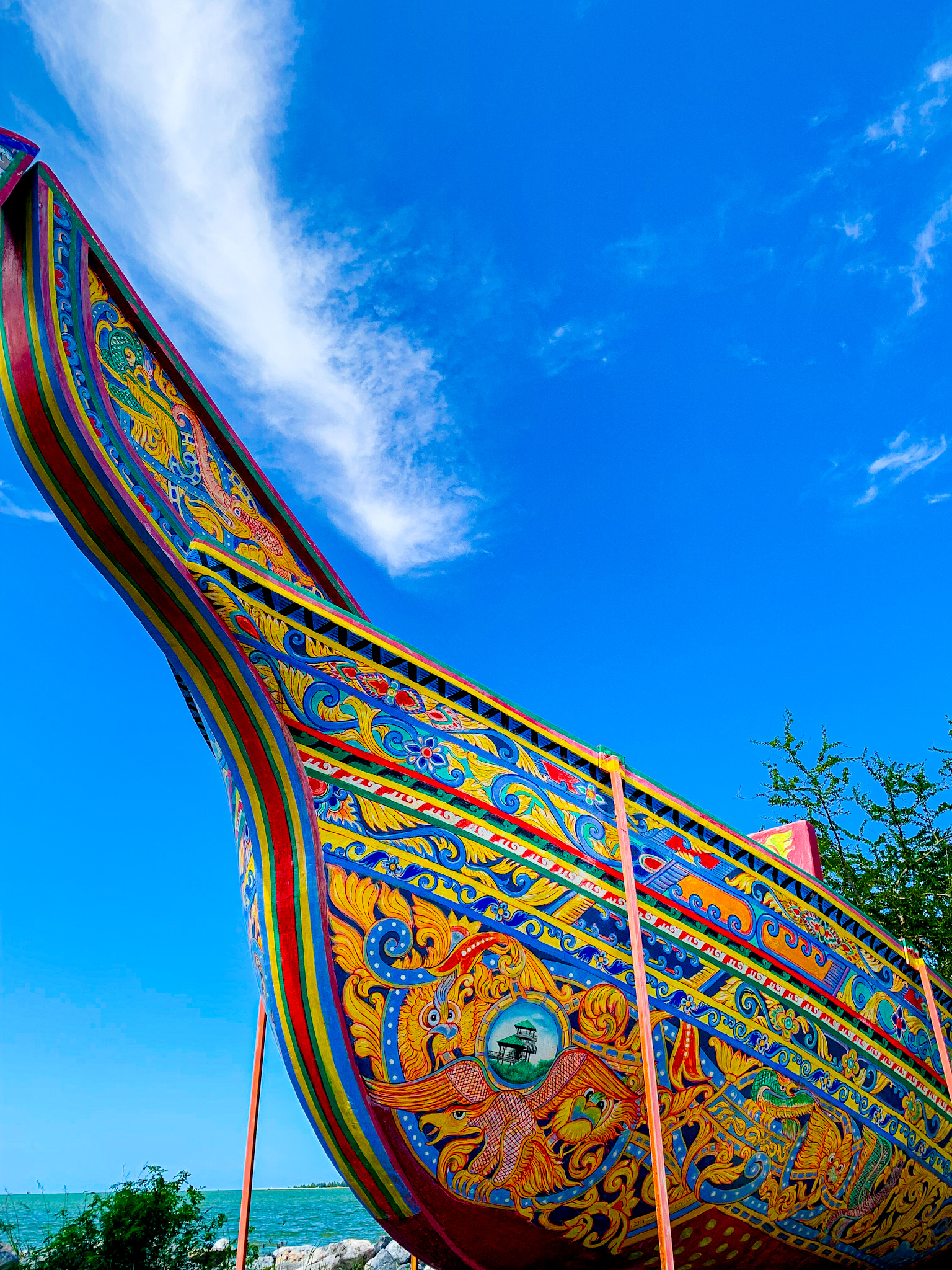
Perahu kolek, a traditional wooden fishing boat decorated with painted and carved motifs

Decorative traditions are also evident in vernacular objects such as wau (traditional kites) and perahu kolek (small wooden boats), both of which carry intricate symbolic motifs. Wau designs commonly feature stylised floral and foliate patterns, often referred to as awan larat, as well as cosmic and natural elements that reflect harmony between the natural world and spiritual order. The symmetrical composition of the wau, particularly in forms such as wau bulan, is associated with balance, prosperity and aesthetic refinement.

Similarly, the perahu kolek, beyond its functional role in fishing and coastal transport, is often embellished with carved and painted motifs along the bow and stern. These include vegetal scrolls, wave patterns, and occasionally zoomorphic elements, which are associated with protection, good fortune, and identity. The visual language of both wau and perahu kolek demonstrates the continuity of Malay artistic principles, where utility and ornamentation are closely intertwined.

=== Architecture ===
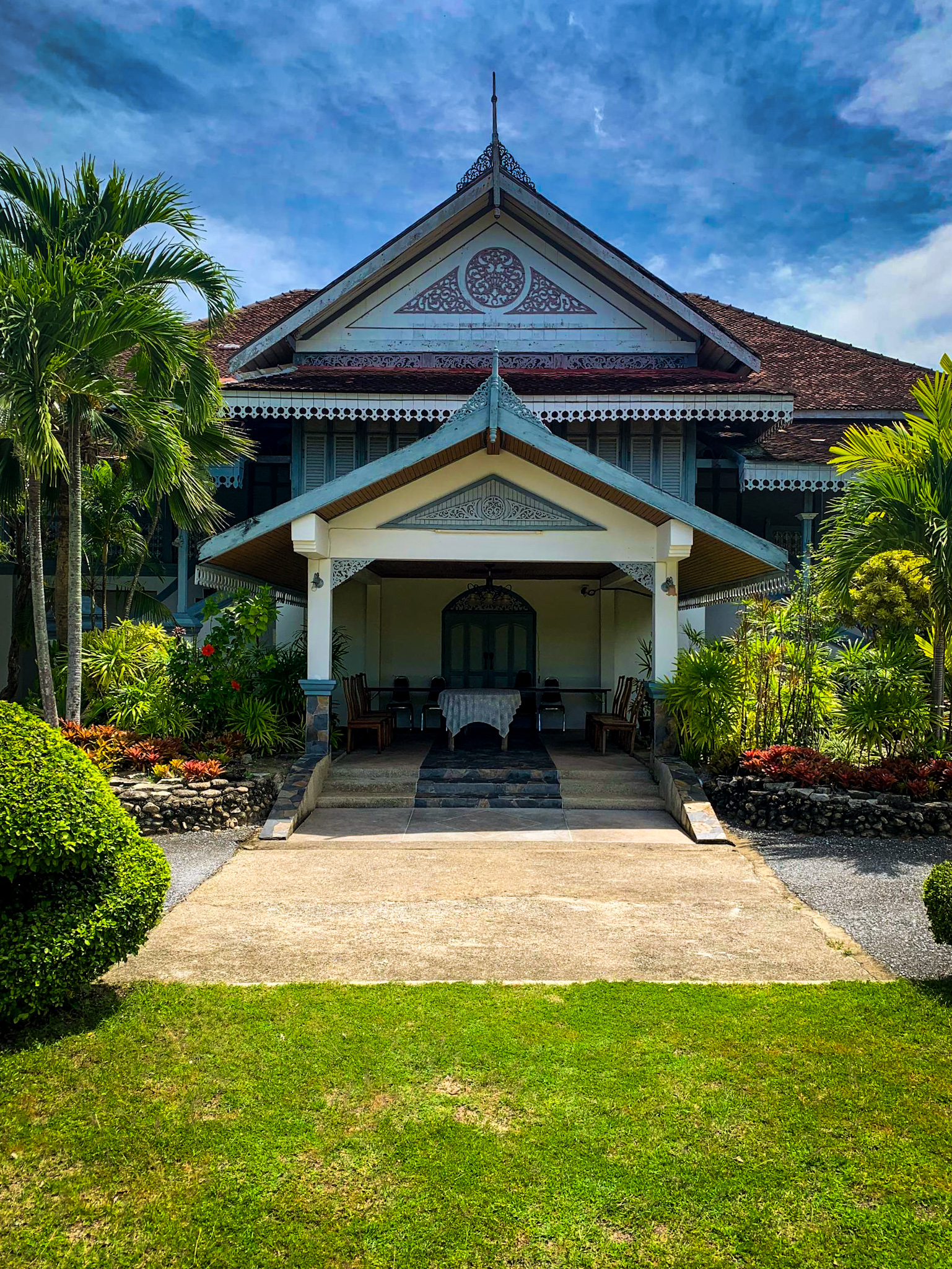
Istana Jambu, a late 19th-century wooden palace in Yaring District, Pattani Province

The material culture of the Patani Malays reflects a synthesis of Malay, Islamic, and regional Southeast Asian artistic traditions, shaped by the area’s long history as a trading and cultural crossroads. Everyday life and artistic expression are visible in the design of houses, mosques, textiles, metalwork, and weaponry, each reflecting both functional and symbolic aspects of Malay identity.

Traditional Malay wooden stilt houses (rumah Melayu Patani) remain a defining feature of the rural landscape. Constructed primarily from hardwood and raised on stilts for ventilation and flood protection, these dwellings are distinguished by intricately carved panels, ventilated gables, and extended verandas that serve social and ceremonial functions. Woodcarving, in particular, has long been valued as both an art form and a spiritual expression, incorporating floral and geometric motifs derived from Islamic aesthetics.

Religious architecture is another hallmark of Patani’s built environment. The Krue Se Mosque (Masjid Kerisik), one of the region’s most significant historical landmarks, exemplifies the fusion of local and foreign architectural influences, combining Middle Eastern, Malay, and classical European stylistic elements. Its long and complex history, often linked in oral tradition to the premodern sultanate, has made it a focal point of scholarly studies on Patani’s cultural heritage and regional identity. The Telok Manoh Mosque in Narathiwat, estimated to be around 300 years old, combines Siamese, Chinese, and Malay architectural styles, reflecting the multicultural influences on southern Thailand’s Islamic communities

Palatial architecture associated with the former Patani polity further illustrates the development of elite building traditions. Although relatively few royal structures have survived, examples such as Istana Jambu, Istana Teluban, and Istana Chabang Tiga provide insight into these forms. In addition to their residential function, such complexes served as historical centres of administration and ceremony.

=== Performing Arts and Folk Practices ===
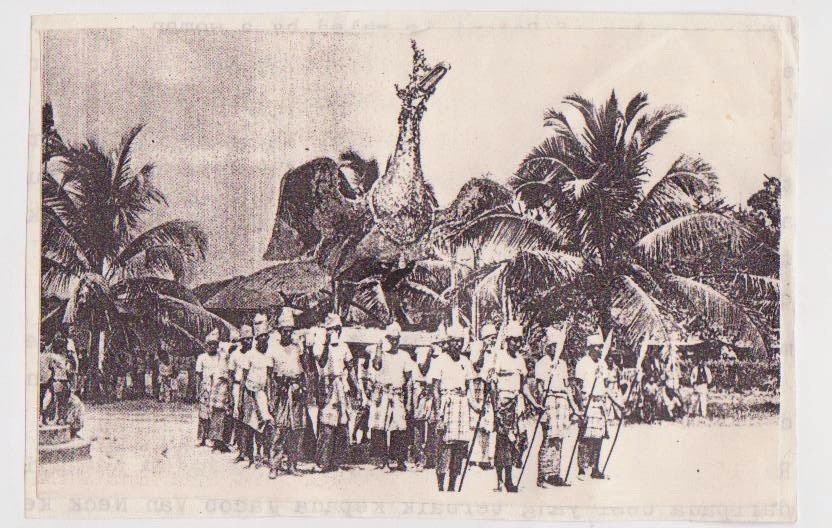
Procession of the Burung Gagak Suro, a traditional mythical bird effigy associated with early Patani legends

Performing arts among the Patani Malays reflect a synthesis of indigenous Malay traditions, regional exchanges, and Islamic reinterpretations. Many forms share roots with the northern Malay cultural zone encompassing Kelantan, Terengganu, and southern Thailand, yet exhibit distinctive local variations.

Traditional genres such as Mak Yong (a dance-drama combining acting, singing, and storytelling), Menora-derived dance theatre, Dikir Barat (choral singing and rhythmic clapping), and pantun recitation have historically served as key mediums for moral instruction, entertainment, and social commentary. While Mak Yong and Menora contain vestiges of pre-Islamic ritual symbolism, practitioners and communities in Patani have adapted these performances to conform more closely to Islamic ethics and local sensibilities. This adaptation has often involved modifying costumes, scripts, or ritual invocations to ensure cultural continuity within a religiously observant framework.

Beyond formal performance, everyday expressions of folk culture such as storytelling (cerita rakyat), lullabies, and poetic exchanges remain an integral part of oral tradition, particularly in rural communities. Religious life and customary law (adat) continue to shape the rhythm of community celebrations, including weddings, circumcision ceremonies, and harvest festivals. These occasions often incorporate Quranic recitations, traditional music, and communal feasting, blending longstanding social customs with Islamic values.

=== Traditional Attire ===
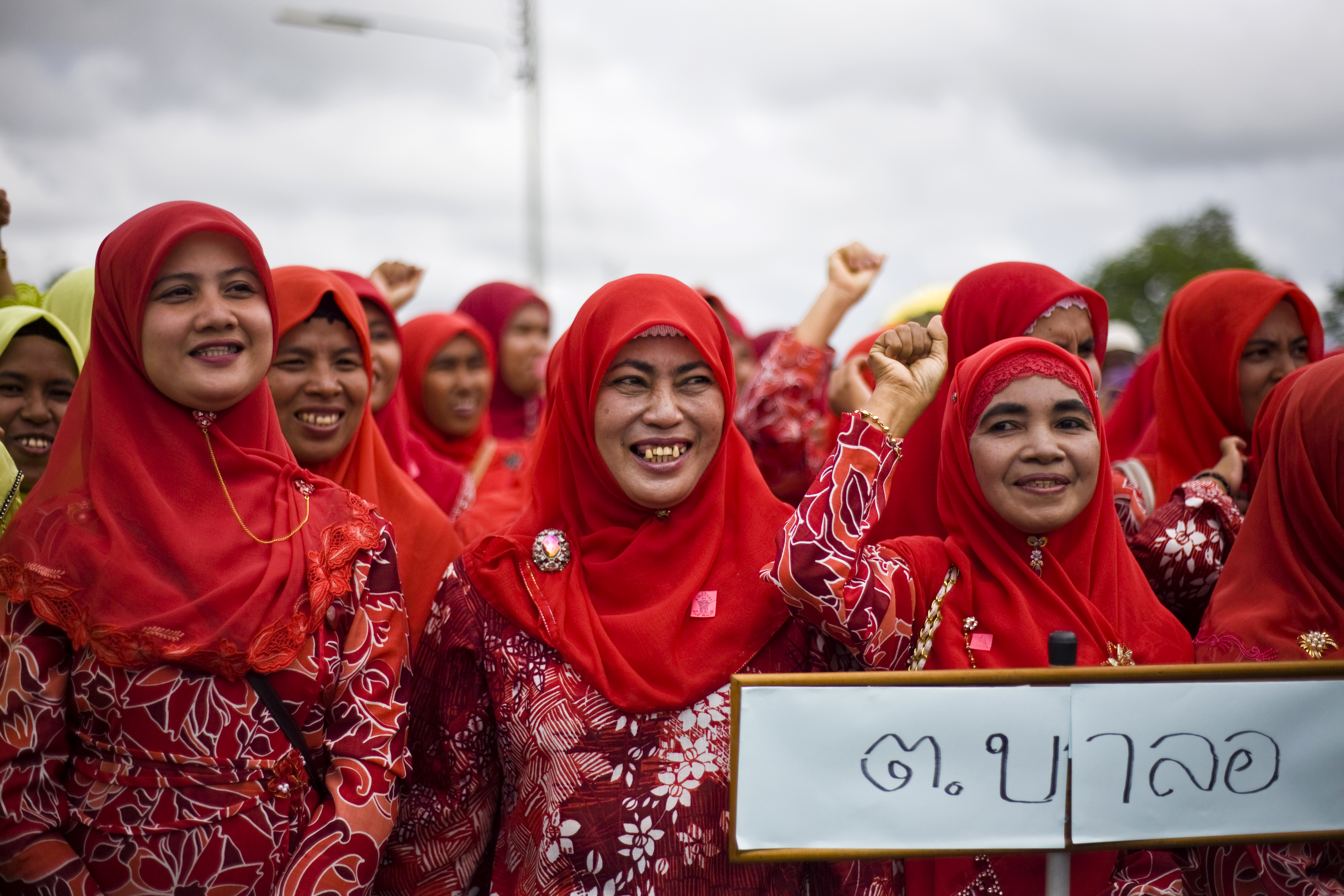
Malay women wearing red baju kurung during a visit by Prime Minister Abhisit Vejjajiva in 2010.

Traditional attire among the Patani Malays closely resembles that of the northern Malay states of Kelantan and Terengganu, reflecting centuries of shared cultural exchange, kinship ties, and cross-border interaction along the eastern coast of the Malay Peninsula. The clothing styles are deeply rooted in the broader Malay sartorial tradition but have evolved to incorporate regional adaptations influenced by Islamic values and local craftsmanship.

For men, the Baju Melayu, a long-sleeved shirt worn with long trousers and traditionally accompanied by a samping (waist cloth), serves as the standard formal and ceremonial dress. The outfit is usually complemented by a songkok, kopiah, or occasionally a serban (turban), symbolising piety and social respectability. Older generations sometimes favour natural fabrics such as cotton, while contemporary variants use blended materials suitable for daily wear and religious gatherings.

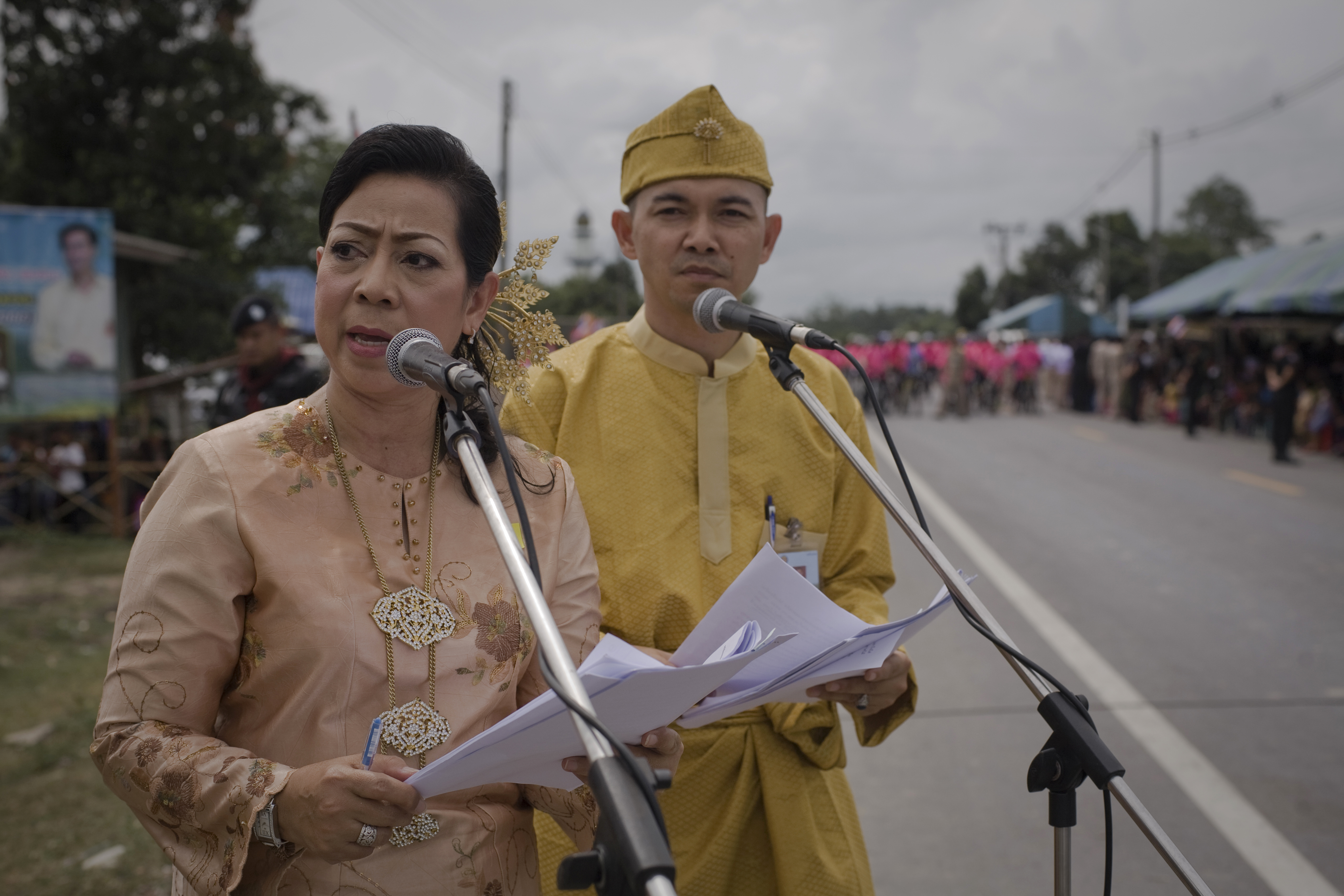
Opening ceremony of a highway in Rueso District, Narathiwat Province, with presenters in traditional formal Malay attire.

Women’s attire generally consists of the baju kurung, a loose-fitting blouse worn over a long skirt, or the more form-fitting baju kebaya, which reflects a fusion of Malay and regional influences. The tudung (headscarf) or selendang (shawl) is commonly worn to observe Islamic modesty, with colour and fabric varying according to the occasion and personal preference. During festive or ceremonial events such as weddings, religious holidays, or official functions, women often wear garments made from songket, a handwoven silk or cotton cloth intricately patterned with gold or silver threads, or batik, whose motifs display floral and geometric patterns inspired by Islamic aesthetics and local nature symbolism.

In rural communities, everyday attire tends to prioritise comfort and practicality, with lighter fabrics suited to the tropical climate. However, the significance of traditional dress extends beyond utility: it is an important marker of cultural identity and social decorum. Clothing is also gendered in ways that reflect Islamic ethics and local interpretations of adat (customary law), balancing modesty with aesthetic expression.

==== Cuisine and Food Culture ====
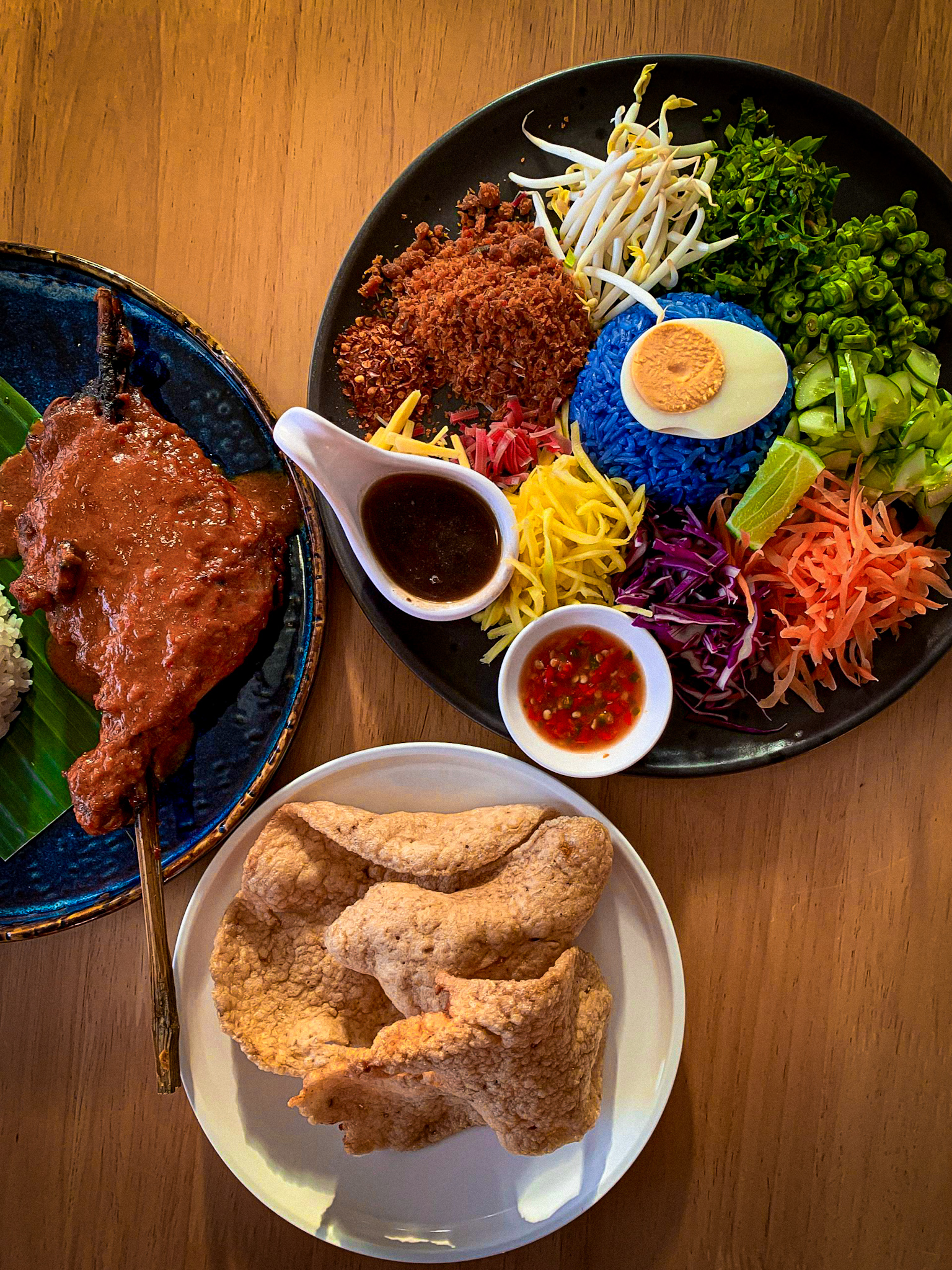
A Patani-styled Nasi kerabu served with ayam golek and keropok

The cuisine of the Patani Malays forms part of the broader Kelantan–Patani culinary sphere, sharing strong affinities with the food traditions of northeastern Peninsular Malaysia while incorporating distinctive local variations. It reflects a synthesis of Malay, Islamic, and Thai influences, characterised by the use of rice, coconut milk, fresh herbs, and an array of aromatic spices and sambals that give Patani dishes their rich and layered flavours.

Staple foods include nasi dagang (steamed rice cooked in coconut milk, typically served with fish curry) and nasi kerabu (blue-tinted rice accompanied by herbs, grated coconut, and spiced condiments), both of which are emblematic of the northern Malay world and are widely consumed in Patani, Yala, and Narathiwat. Other popular local dishes include kaeng som (sour curry) adapted to Malay tastes, pulut kuning (yellow glutinous rice often served at celebrations), and a variety of traditional kuih (cakes and sweets) that reflect both festive and everyday culinary practices.

Food occupies a central role in religious and social life, especially during Islamic festivals such as Eid al-Fitr and Eid al-Adha, as well as in wedding feasts, community gatherings, and mosque events. Shared meals reinforce social cohesion, hospitality, and family ties, while certain ritual foods carry symbolic meanings tied to blessing, gratitude, and communal identity.

=== Festivals and celebrations ===
Islamic festivals form an important part of community life among the Patani Malays. Major religious observances include Eid al-Fitr and Eid al-Adha, which are marked by communal prayers, family visits, and the preparation of traditional foods. In addition to these, local customs and regional practices contribute to a distinct festive culture.

One such tradition is Pintu Gerbang (also known locally as Pitu Gerbae), a communal practice associated with the approach of Ramadan in which decorative gateways are constructed at village entrances. These structures, often illuminated and adorned with ornaments, serve both as a symbolic welcome to the fasting month and as a reflection of collective community effort.

A notable contemporary expression of celebration is Melayu Raya, a distinctive form of Hari Raya Aidilfitri observance in the historic region of Patani. Held several days after the first of Syawal, it combines religious festivity with large-scale cultural gatherings in public spaces, attracting significant participation, particularly among youth dressed in traditional attire such as baju Melayu and baju kurung. The events often feature cultural performances, including silat demonstrations and music, and function as platforms for social interaction and community engagement. They are widely regarded as expressions of Malay cultural identity and continuity, while also reflecting themes of unity and social cohesion within the region.

In the Patani region and neighbouring areas of the northern Malay Peninsula, a celebration known as Raya Enam (Hari Raya Enam), observed on the sixth day of Syawal, traditionally marks the conclusion of the extended festive period following Eid al-Fitr. It is commonly associated with the completion of six days of voluntary fasting (puasa enam) and is commemorated through communal meals, visits, and continued social gatherings.

== See also ==
- Bangkok Malays
- Thai Malays
- Kedahan Malays
- History of Bangkok
