= Raja Ungu =

Sultan of Patani (r. 1624–1635)

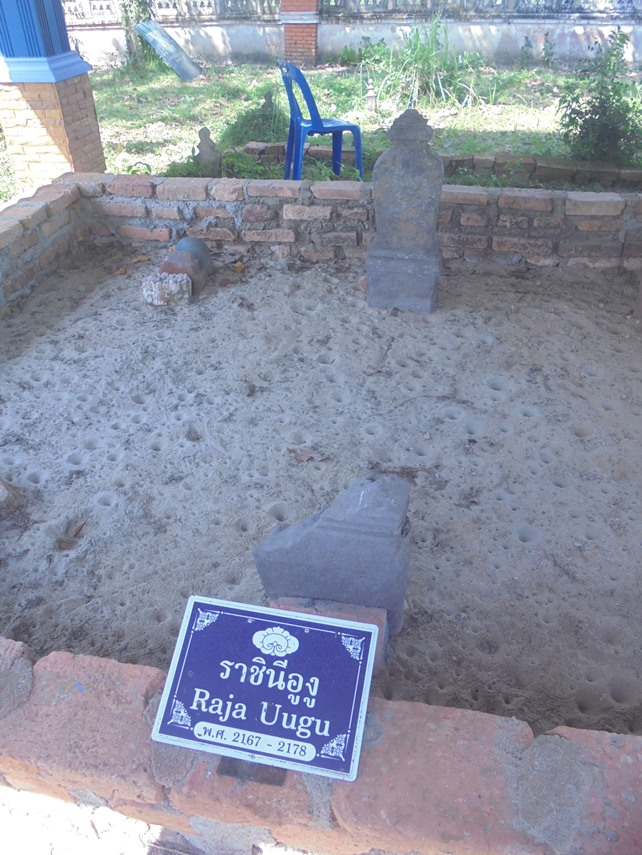

Monarch of Patani
- Reign: 1624–1635
- Predecessor: Raja Biru
- Successor: Raja Kuning

Queen consort of Pahang
- Tenure: 1592–1614
- Died: 1635
- Spouse: Abdul Ghafur Muhiuddin Shah of Pahang (m. 1584; died 1614)
- Father: Sultan Mansur Shah
- Religion: Sunni Islam

Raja Ungu or Ratu Ungu (Thai: รายาอูงู) ruled the Sultanate of Patani (1624–1635), succeeding her sister Raja Biru. In Malay, her name means the "purple queen." She was the third and final daughter of Sultan Mansur Shah to rule the country and was succeeded by her daughter Raja Kuning.

== Reign ==
Raja Ungu was married to King Abdul Ghafur of Pahang. After the king died, Raja Biru sent for her to return to Patani. When Raja Biru died around 1624, Raja Ungu succeeded her as ruler of Patani. Raja Ungu showed more antipathy towards the Siamese than her predecessors, and abandoned the Siamese title peracau, using instead the title paduka syah alam ("her excellency ruler of the world"). She launched an attack on Siam with 3,000 men in 1624 and early 1625, which ended successfully as Siam was said to have renounced the claim on Patani. She married off her daughter (who later became Raja Kuning) to the ruler of Johor Sultan Abdul Jalil Shah III in 1632. However, her daughter was already married to the king of Bordelong (in modern-day Phatthalung), Okphaya Déca, who then urged the Siamese to attack Patani.

Following the usurpation of the throne of Ayutthaya by King Prasat Thong in 1629, she also refused to send the bunga mas (golden flowers) which were typically sent as a sign of Patani's tributary status to Siam. In 1632, Ayutthaya sent an army south together with their ally Ligor to quell her rebellion, but the attack was repulsed. A subsequent attack by Siam in 1634 was supposed to be joined by the Dutch but the latter's ships arrived too late and again the attack failed. Although Patani managed to repel the attacks, trade in Patani fell significantly. Finally in 1636, following the death of Raja Ungu, a peace settlement was reached to restore relations between the two states.

Raja Ungu House of Sri Wangsa Born: ? Died: 1635
Regnal titles
Preceded by Biru	Sultana of Patani; 1624–1635	Succeeded by Kuning
