= Raja Kuning =

Queen of Patani

Monarch of Patani
- Reign: 1635–1651?
- Predecessor: Raja Ungu
- Father: Abdul Ghafur Muhiuddin Shah of Pahang
- Mother: Raja Ungu
- Religion: Islam

Raja Kuning or Ratu Kuning was the sovereign queen of Patani in the 17th century. Her name means "the Yellow Queen" in English.

She succeeded her mother, Queen Raja Ungu. She was the last of four female rulers to have ruled in succession in the Patani Kingdom since 1584. She is the last queen regnant who is acknowledged as legitimate in the Patani chronicles. As Patani became less internationally attractive for traders in the late 17th century, sources about Patani history are scarce in that period. There is dispute over when her rule ended, and who succeeded her.

== Early life ==
Raja Kuning was the daughter of Raja Ungu and the Sultan of Pahang. After the Sultan of Pahang died, she returned to Patani with her mother. She was said to be named Kuning (meaning "Yellow") because she had whitish-yellow skin. At the age of 12, she married Okphaya Déca, King of Bordelong Phatthalung, for an alliance between Patani kingdom and Ayutthaya kingdom. After Patani had break off relations with Ayutthaya, her mother, the Queen Raja Ungu gave her daughter to marry Sultan Abdul Jalil Shah III of Johor in 1632. This led to an attack from Ayutthaya at the prompting of Okphaya Déca.

== Reign ==
Around about 18 months after the war between Patani and Ayutthaya, Raja Ungu died in 1635. Princess Kuning then succeeded her mother to reign in Patani. At that time Ayutthaya was also preparing to go to war again in 1636, but the Raja of Kedah intervened to help with the negotiations with Patani. Raja Kuning chose not to continue the war, restored the relationship with Ayutthaya again, visiting the Ayutthaya court in 1641, and resumed sending bunga mas tribute to Ayutthaya. However, she did not appear to have wielded significant political power, and important decisions were made by the elite (orang kaya) in the country. Her personal wealth was transferred to the state five days after her coronation.

Her marriage to Sultan Abdul Jalil Shah III of Johor was dissolved around 1642 or 1643, and she was then married to the Sultan's brother, either forcibly or willingly. Her new husband appeared to have usurped her throne by 1644. After the prince of Johor insulted the nobility of Patani by demanding that their wives and daughters be brought to the palace to serve him and threatened to put them in stocks, the Patani nobility attacked the prince of Johor, massacred members of his entourage, and drove him back to Johor. In 1646, Patani joined other tributary states to rebel against Ayutthaya, then in joined Songkla in 1649 to capture Ligor (Nakhon Si Thammarat). The Siamese retaliated and subdue the southern polities, forcing them to resume their tributary status.

The events surrounding the end of her reign is not clear as Patani sources provided no information. According to Kelantan sources, Raja Kuning was deposed in 1651 by the Raja of Kelantan, who was angered by her refusal to acknowledge his legitimacy. The Raja of Kelantan installed his son as the ruler of Patani. However, a queen appeared to have been in control of Patani again by 1670. When Phetracha took control of Ayutthaya in 1688, Patani refused to acknowledge his authority and rebelled. Ayutthaya then invaded with 50,000 men and subdued Patani. Some claimed her reign ended in 1688, although more likely the queen in 1670 was a different person, and that Raja Kuning's reign ended in 1651. Raja Kuning was said to have died while going to Johor by sea to reunite with her husband, and she was buried in Pancor in Kelantan. The queen of Pattani in 1670 may be Raja Mas Kelantan.

Raja Kuning House of Melaka Born: ? Died: ?
Regnal titles
Preceded by Ungu	Sultana of Patani; 1635–1651	Vacant Title next held by Bakal
