= Raja Hijau =

Sovereign queen of Patani (r. 1584–1616)

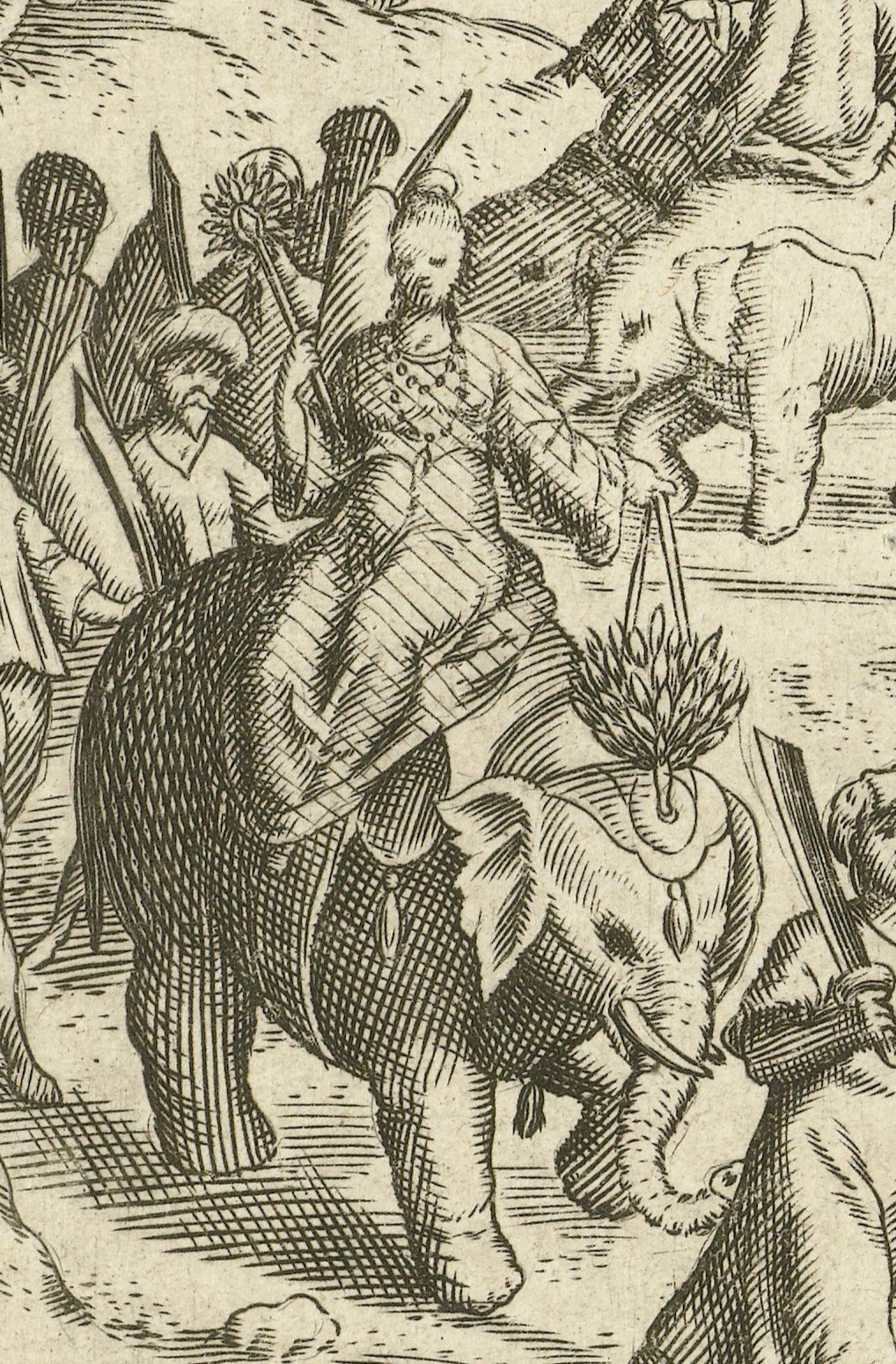

Queen of Patani Kingdom
- Reign: 1584–1616
- Successor: Raja Biru
- Died: 28 August 1616
- Dynasty: Sriwangsa
- Father: Sultan Mansur Shah
- Religion: Islam

Raja Hijau or Ratu Hijau (Thai: รายาฮิเยา; Malay: راتو هيجاو), also spelt Raja Ijau, was a Malay sovereign queen of Patani who reigned from 1584 to 1616. Her name means "the Green Queen" in English. She was also known as the 'great queen of Patani'. Her rule in Patani ushered in the golden age of Patani.

== Early life ==
Raja Hijau was the eldest of three daughters of Sultan Mansur Shah. There is no mention of her being married in historical accounts, but some have speculated that she married the Chinese pirate Lin Daoqian who was said to have married a Sultan's daughter in Patani. Her younger brother Bahdur succeeded to the throne aged 10, but was murdered in 1584 by his half-brother who was in turn killed.

== Reign ==
According to the Portuguese chronicler Mendez Pinto, she came to the throne in 1584 as a sister of the murdered Patani king after twenty years of instability in the country. There was apparently a lack of male heirs as a number of them were murdered in this period of political turbulence and violence. Raja Hijau adopted the title of peracau derived from the Siamese royal title phra chao. Early in her reign she saw off an attempted coup by her prime minister, Bendahara Kayu Kelat. She ordered that a dam be built to divert water to a dug channel to ensure supply of water to Patani. She ruled for 32 years, and brought considerable stability to the country.

During her reign, trade with the outside world increased, and European traders such as the Portuguese and Dutch came to the port. The majority of the merchants were said to be Chinese merchants, of which the most important of them, such as the leading commercial official Datu Sirinara, had converted to Islam and adopted Malay court etiquette. The first Dutch Company agents visited this region of what is now southern Thailand during her reign in 1602, while the English arrived in 1612. According to Jacob van Neck's writing in 1604, he reported a relatively prosperous state under Raja Hijau, who was "one well-disposed to merchants". The arrival of the European also led to conflicts, and the Dutch attacked English ships in Patani, which led to the withdrawal of the English from Patani even though Raja Hijau ordered that the English be protected. Nevertheless, as a result of increasing trade, Pattani prospered.

European visitors to Patani were impressed by the queen and the pomp and splendour of her court. An Englishman Peter Floris who visited Patani in 1612–1613 described the queen as a 'comely oldewoman' and 'tall of person and full of majestie, having in all the Indies not seenemany lyke unto hir'. When she went hunting, she was accompanied by over 600 boats. A Dutchman named Roelof Roelofsz described a procession in Patani in 1602 where the queen was greeted by around 4,000 men in arms, and the procession included 156 big elephants, 'some of which were very decoratively made up'. Jacob van Neck said her palace was decorated with 'golden panels and carved wooden decorations'. The Malay monarchy under her rule absorbed diversity of foreign traders into a polyglot elite united by the royal person, a Malay lingua franca, and a pattern of rules and sacred regalia passed down from courts such as Melaka and Pasai. Patani also become a centre of culture, producing high quality works of music, dance, drama and handicraft. Peter Floris described a dance performed in Patani as the finest he had seen in all of the Indies.

Raja Hijau died on 28 August 1616 after ruling for 32 years. She was given the posthumous title of Marhum Ketemangan. According to Hikayat Patani, all the men were ordered to shave off their hair and all the women trimmed their hair in mourning. She was succeeded by her younger sister Raja Biru.

Raja Hijau House of Sri Wangsa Born: ? Died: 1616
Regnal titles
Preceded by Bahdur	Sultana of Patani; 1584–1616	Succeeded by Biru
