= Raja Biru =

Sultan of Patani (r. 1616–1624)

Monarch of Patani
- Reign: 1616–1624
- Predecessor: Raja Hijau
- Successor: Raja Ungu
- Born: c. 1566
- Died: 1624
- Father: Sultan Mansur Shah
- Religion: Sunni Islam

Raja Biru or Ratu Biru (Thai: รายาบีรู; Malay: راتو بيرو; c. 1566–1624) ruled the Sultanate of Patani (1616–1624), succeeding her sister Raja Hijau. She was the second of three daughters of Sultan Mansur Shah who ruled the country. She was succeeded by her sister Raja Ungu. In Malay, her name means "Blue" or "Blue Queen."

== Reign ==
Raja Biru was around 50 when she became queen in 1616. During her reign, Patani faced increasing threats from the Siamese. In response to the threats, she was said to have ordered a man of Chinese descent named Tok Kayan to create three large cannons. One of these Phaya Tani was later seized by the Siamese and is now located in Bangkok. Raja Biru persuaded the Kelantan Sultanate in the south to become incorporated into Patani.

Raja Biru died in 1624. She was succeeded by her younger sister Raja Ungu who was married to the Sultan of Pahang and had returned from Pahang after her husband died.

Raja Biru House of Sri Wangsa Born: 1566 Died: 1624
Regnal titles
| Preceded by Hijau | Sultana of Patani; 1616–1624 | Succeeded by Ungu |
