= List of active rebel groups =

This is a list of active rebel groups around the world. A "rebel group" is defined here as a polity that uses armed conflict in opposition to established government (or governments) for reasons such as to seek political change or to establish, maintain, or to gain independence.

== Rebel groups by state ==
Rebel groups are listed by the states within which they operate.

Within state	Rebel group	Subgroups / Affiliates	Conflict	Year Established	Leader	References
Multinational: Democratic Republic of the Congo; Uganda	Allied Democratic Forces (ADF)	Islamic State – Central Africa Province (one faction)	Allied Democratic Forces insurgency; Kivu conflict; Ituri conflict	1996	Musa Baluku	
Multinational: Algeria; Bangladesh; Burkina Faso; Chad; Egypt; Iraq; Israel; Ivory Coast; Kenya; Libya; Mali; Niger; Nigeria; Pakistan; Somalia; Tunisia; Yemen; Guinea; Ethiopia; India; Togo; Palestine; Mauritania; Saudi Arabia; Turkey; Iran; Lebanon; Syria	Al-Qaeda	Al-Qaeda in the Arabian Peninsula; Al-Qaeda in the Indian Subcontinent; Al-Qaeda in the Islamic Maghreb; Al-Shabaab; Ansar al-Sharia (Yemen); Ansar Ghazwat-ul-Hind; Ansaru; Jama'at Nasr al-Islam wal Muslimin; Kurdistan Brigades; Salafia Jihadia; United Army For Palestine Freedom	Afghanistan conflict; Al-Qaeda insurgency in Yemen; Yemeni Civil War; Insurgency in the Maghreb; Northern Mali conflict; Insurgency in Balochistan; War in North-West Pakistan; Somali Civil War; Insurgency in Egypt; Libyan Crisis (2011–present); War in the Sahel	1988	Saif al-Adel	
Multinational:IrelandUnited Kingdom	Continuity Irish Republican Army (CIRA)	None	Dissident Irish republican campaign	1994	Continuity Army Council	
Multinational:IrelandUnited Kingdom	New Irish Republican Army	None	Dissident Irish republican campaign	2012	Army Council	
Multinational: Afghanistan; Azerbaijan; Georgia; Tajikistan; Bangladesh; Burkina Faso; Cameroon; Chad; Democratic Republic of the Congo; Egypt; India; Iraq; Iran; Mozambique; Mali; Niger; Nigeria; Pakistan; Philippines; Russia; Saudi Arabia; Somalia; Syria; Turkey	Islamic State	Allied Democratic Forces (factions); Azerbaijan Province; Caucasus Province; Central Africa Province; Hind Province; Islamic State in Somalia; Khorasan Province; Pakistan Province; Sahel Province; Turkey Province; West Africa Province; Yemen Province	Islamic State–Taliban conflict; Yemeni Civil War; Insurgency in the Maghreb; Northern Mali conflict; War in the Sahel; War in North-West Pakistan; Somali Civil War; Syrian conflict; Insurgency in Egypt; Turkey–ISIL conflict; ISIL insurgency in the Philippines; Iraqi insurgency (2017–present); Boko Haram insurgency; Gaza–Israel conflict; Kivu conflict; Allied Democratic Forces insurgency; Insurgency in Cabo Delgado; Ituri conflict; Islamic State insurgency in the North Caucasus	1999	Abu Hafs al-Hashimi al-Qurashi	
Multinational: Central African Republic; Democratic Republic of the Congo; South Sudan; Uganda; Sudan	Lord's Resistance Army	None	Lord's Resistance Army insurgency; Central African Republic Civil War	1987	Joseph Kony	
Afghanistan	Afghanistan Freedom Front	None	Afghanistan conflict	2022		
Afghanistan	National Resistance Front of Afghanistan	None	Afghanistan conflict	2021	Ahmad Massoud	
Angola	Republic of Cabinda	FLEC	Cabinda War	1975	António Bento Bembe	
Cameroon	Ambazonia	List of Ambazonian militant groups	Anglophone Crisis	2017	Samuel Ikome Sako	
Central African Republic	(Central African Republic) Coalition of Patriots for Change	Anti-balaka; Central African Patriotic Movement; Popular Front for the Rebirth of Central African Republic	Central African Republic Civil War	2020	François Bozizé (alleged)	
Central African Republic	(Central African Republic) Party of the Rally of the Central African Nation	None	Central African Republic Civil War	2019	Nourd Gregaza	
Chile	Coordinadora Arauco-Malleco	Lafkenche Mapuche Resistance	Mapuche conflict	1998	Héctor Llaitul	
Chile	Weichán Auka Mapu	None	Mapuche conflict	2011	Collective leadership	
China	East Turkestan Islamic Movement	None	Xinjiang conflict	1988	Abdullah Mansour	
Colombia	Autodefensas Gaitanistas de Colombia	None		2001	Dario Antonio Úsuga	
Colombia	National Liberation Army (ELN)	None		1964	Antonio Garcia	
Colombia	Popular Liberation Army (EPL)	None		1967		
Colombia	FARC dissidents	None		2016	Gentil "Cabuyo" Duarte	
Democratic Republic of the Congo	Bundu dia Kongo (BDK)	None	Katanga insurgency; Ituri conflict; Kivu conflict	1986	Ne Muanda Nsemi	
Democratic Republic of the Congo	CODECO	None	Katanga insurgency; Ituri conflict; Kivu conflict	1970s		
Democratic Republic of the Congo	Coordination for a Referendum on Self-determination for Katanga (CORAK)	None	Katanga insurgency; Ituri conflict; Kivu conflict			
Democratic Republic of the Congo	Democratic Forces for the Liberation of Rwanda (FDLR)	None	Katanga insurgency; Ituri conflict; Kivu conflict	2000		
Democratic Republic of the Congo	Mai-Mai	None	Katanga insurgency; Ituri conflict; Kivu conflict	1960s		
Democratic Republic of the Congo	Mai Mai Kata Katanga	None	Katanga insurgency; Ituri conflict; Kivu conflict	2011		
Democratic Republic of the Congo	Mai Mai Gédéon	None	Katanga insurgency; Ituri conflict; Kivu conflict			
Democratic Republic of the Congo	Mai Mai Sheka	None	Katanga insurgency; Ituri conflict; Kivu conflict			
Democratic Republic of the Congo	Mai-Mai Simba	None	Katanga insurgency; Ituri conflict; Kivu conflict			
Democratic Republic of the Congo	Mai Mai Yakutumba	None	Katanga insurgency; Ituri conflict; Kivu conflict			
Democratic Republic of the Congo	National Coalition of the People for the Sovereignty of Congo	None	Katanga insurgency; Ituri conflict; Kivu conflict	2017	William Yakutumba	
Democratic Republic of the Congo	Nationalist and Integrationist Front (FNI)	None	Katanga insurgency; Ituri conflict; Kivu conflict	2005	Peter Karim Udaga	
Democratic Republic of the Congo	Nyatura	None	Katanga insurgency; Ituri conflict; Kivu conflict			
Democratic Republic of the Congo	Patriotic Resistance Front of Ituri (FRPI)	None	Katanga insurgency; Ituri conflict; Kivu conflict	2002	Cobra Matata	
Democratic Republic of the Congo	Popular Front for Justice in the Congo (FPJC)	None	Katanga insurgency; Ituri conflict; Kivu conflict	2008	David Mbadu	
Democratic Republic of the Congo	Progressive Katanga Congress (CPK)	None	Katanga insurgency; Ituri conflict; Kivu conflict			
Democratic Republic of the Congo	Raia Mutomboki	None	Katanga insurgency; Ituri conflict; Kivu conflict	2005	Isaac Chirambiza	
Democratic Republic of the Congo	RUD-Urunana	None	Katanga insurgency; Ituri conflict; Kivu conflict			
Democratic Republic of the Congo	Union of Congolese Patriots (UPC)	None	Katanga insurgency; Ituri conflict; Kivu conflict	2001	Bosco Ntaganda	
Democratic Republic of the Congo	March 23 Movement (M23)	None	Katanga insurgency; Ituri conflict; Kivu conflict	2012	Bertrand Bisimwa	
Egypt	Hasm Movement	None	Insurgency in Egypt	2015		
Ethiopia	Fano	Wollo Fano; Gojjam Fano; Gondar Fano; Shewa Fano; Amhara People's Army	War in Amhara	2018		
Ethiopia	Oromo Liberation Army		Oromo conflict	2020	Kumsa Diriba	
Ethiopia	Tigray People's Liberation Front	Tigray Defense Forces	Tigray War	1975	Debretsion Gebremichael	
France	Comité Régional d'Action Viticole (CRAV)	None		1975		
Greece	Black Star	None				
Greece	Conspiracy of Fire Nuclei	None		2008		
Haiti	Viv Ansanm	400 Mawozo; Chèn Méchan; G-Pèp; Gran Grif other groups	Haitian conflict	2024	Jimmy Chérizier	
India	Hizbul Mujahideen	Dukhtaran-e-Milat	Insurgency in Jammu and Kashmir	1989	Sayeed Salahudeen	
India	Jaish-e-Mohammed	• Lashkar-e-Mustafa • Kashmir Tigers	Insurgency in Jammu and Kashmir	2000	Masood Azhar	
India	Lashkar-e-Taiba	The Resistance Front	Insurgency in Jammu and Kashmir	1986	Hafiz Muhammad Saeed	
India	United Jihad Council	Hizbul Mujahideen; Jaish-e-Mohammed; Lashkar-e-Taiba	Insurgency in Jammu and Kashmir	1994		
India	National Socialist Council of Nagaland	None	Insurgency in Northeast India	1980	Thuingaleng Muivah	
India	United Liberation Front of Asom	None	Insurgency in Northeast India	1979		
India	Communist Party of India (Maoist)	None	Naxalite–Maoist insurgency	2004	Nambala Keshava Rao	
India	Maoist Communist Party of Manipur	None	Naxalite–Maoist insurgency	2011		
India	International Sikh Youth Federation	None		1987	Lakhbir Singh Rode	
India	Khalistan Zindabad Force	None		1988	Ranjit Singh Neeta	
India	Students' Islamic Movement of India	None		1977		
Indonesia	Free Papua Movement	None	Papua conflict	1963	Mathias Wenda	
Indonesia	Jamaah Ansharusy Syariah (JAS)	None				
Indonesia	South Moluccas	None		1950		
Iran	Democratic Party of Iranian Kurdistan	None	Western Iran clashes	1945	Mustafa Hijri	
Iran	Komala Party of Iranian Kurdistan	None	Western Iran clashes	2000	Abdullah Mohtadi	
Iran	Kurdistan Freedom Party	None	Western Iran clashes	1991	Hussein Yazdanpanah	
Iran	Kurdistan Free Life Party	None	Western Iran clashes; Iran–PJAK conflict	2004	Abdul Rahman Haji Ahmadi	
Iran	People's Fighters Front	None	Insurgency in Balochistan	2025		
Iran	Arab Struggle Movement for the Liberation of Ahvaz	None	Khuzestan conflict	2005	Habib Jabor / Saddam Hattem	
Iran	Communist Party of Iran (Marxist–Leninist–Maoist)	None		2001		
Iran	People's Mujahedin of Iran	None		1965	Maryam Rajavi	
Iraq	Army of the Men of the Naqshbandi Order	None	Insurgency in Iraq	2006	Salah Al-Mukhtar	
Italy	Informal Anarchist Federation	None		2003		
Libya	Green Resistance	None	Libyan Crisis (2011–present)	2014		
Libya	Libyan National Army	Libyan Army (part); Libyan Air Force (part); Libyan Navy (part); Libyan Special Forces; Tariq Ben Zeyad Brigade	Libyan Crisis (2011–present)	2011	Khalifa Haftar	
Libya	Toubou Front for the Salvation of Libya	None	Libyan Crisis (2011–present)	2007	Issa Abdel Majid Mansur	
Libya	(Libya) Zintan Brigades	None	Libyan Crisis (2011–present)	2011	Kalifah Shahub	
Mali	Ansar al-Sharia	None	Mali War	2012		
Mali	Azawad Liberation Front	None	Mali War	2011	Alghabass Ag Intalla	
Mexico	Popular Revolutionary Army	None		1996	Edmundo Reyes	
Mexico	Zapatista Army of National Liberation	None	Chiapas conflict	1983		
Mozambique	Al-Shabaab	None	Insurgency in Cabo Delgado	2015		
Myanmar	All Burma Students' Democratic Front (ABSDF)	None	Internal conflict in Myanmar	1988	Than Khae	
Myanmar	DKBA-5	None	Internal conflict in Myanmar	2010	Saw Mo Shay	
Myanmar	Shan State Army – South (SSA-S)	None	Internal conflict in Myanmar	1996	Yawd Serk	
Myanmar	United Nationalities Federal Council (UNFC)	Arakan Army (AA); Arakan Liberation Army (ALA/ALP); Chin National Front (CNF); Kachin Independence Organisation (KIO/KIA); Karen National Union (KNU); Karenni National Progressive Party (KNPP); Lahu Democratic Union (LDU); New Mon State Party (NMSP); Pa-O National Liberation Army (PNLA); Palaung State Liberation Front (PSLF); Shan State Army – North (SSA-N/SSPP); Wa National Organisation (WNO)	Internal conflict in Myanmar	2011	Nai Hong Sar	
Myanmar	United Wa State Army	None	Internal conflict in Myanmar	1989	Bao Youxiang	
Nigeria	Indigenous People of Biafra	Eastern Security Network	Insurgency in Southeastern Nigeria	2012	Nnamdi Kanu	
Nigeria	Adaka Biafra Marine Commandos	None	Conflict in the Niger Delta			
Nigeria	Asawana Deadly Force of Niger Delta (ADFND)	None	Conflict in the Niger Delta			
Nigeria	Biafra Avengers	None	Conflict in the Niger Delta			
Nigeria	Joint Niger Delta Liberation Force	None	Conflict in the Niger Delta			
Nigeria	Joint Revolutionary Council of the Joint Niger Delta Liberation Force (JNDLF)	None	Conflict in the Niger Delta			
Nigeria	Movement for the Emancipation of the Niger Delta	None	Conflict in the Niger Delta	2004	Henry Okah	
Nigeria	Niger Delta Avengers	None	Conflict in the Niger Delta	2016		
Nigeria	Niger Delta People's Volunteer Force	None	Conflict in the Niger Delta	2004		
Nigeria	Niger Delta Red Squad	None	Conflict in the Niger Delta			
Nigeria	Red Egbesu Water Lions	None	Conflict in the Niger Delta			
Nigeria	Red Scorpion	None	Conflict in the Niger Delta			
Nigeria	Utorogun Liberation Movement (ULM)	None	Conflict in the Niger Delta			
Nigeria	Ultimate Warriors of Niger Delta	None	Conflict in the Niger Delta			
Nigeria	Ansaru	None	Islamist insurgency in Nigeria	2012		
Nigeria	Boko Haram	None	Islamist insurgency in Nigeria	2002	Abu Umaimata	
Nigeria	Lakurawa	None	Islamist insurgency in Nigeria	2016	Ameer Habib Tajje	
Nigeria	Fulani herdsmen	None	Herder–farmer conflicts in Nigeria	1999		
Pakistan	Baloch Republican Army	None	Insurgency in Balochistan	2007	Brahumdagh Bugti	
Pakistan	Balochistan Liberation Army	None	Insurgency in Balochistan	2000	Hyrbyair Marri	
Pakistan	People's Fighters Front	None	Insurgency in Balochistan	2025		
Pakistan	Tehrik-i-Taliban	Hafiz Gul Bahadur Group; Jamaat-ul-Ahrar; Tehreek-e-Nafaz-e-Shariat-e-Mohammadi	Insurgency in Khyber Pakhtunkhwa	2007	Noor Wali Mehsud	
Palestine	Al-Aqsa Martyrs' Brigades	None		2000		
Palestine	Army of Islam	None		2006	Mumtaz Dughmush	
Palestine	Democratic Front for the Liberation of Palestine	National Resistance Brigades		1968	Nayef Hawatmeh	
Palestine	Hamas	Izz ad-Din al-Qassam Brigades		1987	Khaled Mashal	
Palestine	Islamic Jihad Movement in Palestine	Al-Quds Brigades		1987	Ziyad al-Nakhalah / Abd Al Aziz Awda	
Palestine	Lions' Den	None		2022		
Palestine	Popular Front for the Liberation of Palestine	Abu Ali Mustafa Brigades		1967	Ahmad Sa'adat	
Palestine	Popular Resistance Committees	Al-Nasser Salah al-Deen Brigades		2000	Ayman al-Shashniya	
Paraguay	Army of Marshal López (Ejército del Mariscal López, EML)	None	Insurgency in Paraguay			
Paraguay	Paraguayan People's Army (EPP)	None	Insurgency in Paraguay	2006	Osvaldo Villalba	
Peru	Militarized Communist Party of Peru	None	Internal conflict in Peru	1992	Comrade José	
Peru	Shining Path	None	Internal conflict in Peru	1960s	Abimael Guzmán	
Philippines	Bangsamoro Islamic Freedom Fighters	None	Civil conflict in the Philippines	2008	Esmail Abdulmalik	
Philippines	Communist Party of the Philippines	New People's Army	Civil conflict in the Philippines	1968		
Senegal	Movement of Democratic Forces of Casamance	None	Casamance conflict	1982		
South Sudan	Nuer White Army	None	Ethnic violence in South Sudan	1991	Bordoang Leah	
South Sudan	Sudan People's Liberation Movement-in-Opposition	None	Ethnic violence in South Sudan	2013	Riek Machar	
Sudan	Sudanese Awakening Revolutionary Council	None	War in Darfur	2014	Musa Hilal	
Sudan	Janjaweed	None	Sudanese civil war (2023)	1987		
Sudan	Rapid Support Forces	None	Sudanese civil war (2023)	2013	Hemedti	
Sudan	Sudan Liberation Movement (al-Nur)	None	Sudanese civil war (2023)	2006	Abdul Wahid al-Nur	
Sudan	Sudan People's Liberation Movement–North (al-Hilu)	None	Sudanese civil war (2023)	2017	Abdelaziz al-Hilu	
Sudan	Tamazuj	None	Sudanese civil war (2023)			
Syria	Autonomous Administration of North and East Syria	Army of Revolutionaries; Asayish; People's Protection Units; Kurdish Front; Sutoro; Syriac Military Council; Women's Protection Units	Syrian conflict	2013	Îlham Ehmed / Mansur Selum	
Syria	Coastal Shield Brigade	None	Syrian conflict	2025	Miqdad Fatiha	
Syria	Guardians of Truth Battalions	None	Syrian conflict	2025		
Syria	Islamic Resistance Front in Syria	Syrian Popular Resistance; Coastal Shield Brigade defectors; Popular Resistance of the Eastern Region; Popular Resistance in Daraa; Popular Resistance in Quneitra; Saraya al-Areen; Baqiyat Allah Brigades	Syrian conflict	2024		
Syria	Military Council for the Liberation of Syria	None	Syrian conflict	2025	Ghiath Suleiman Dalla	
Syria	Saraya Ansar al-Sunnah	None	Syrian conflict	2025	Abu Aisha al-Shami	
Syria	Ya Ali Popular Formations	None	Syrian conflict	2025		
Thailand	Barisan Revolusi Nasional	None	South Thailand insurgency	1963		
Thailand	Gerakan Mujahidin Islam Patani	None	South Thailand insurgency	1995	Nasoree Saesang	
Thailand	Islamic Liberation Front of Patani	None	South Thailand insurgency	1947	Tengku Mahmood Mahyideen / Tengku Abdul Jalal	
Thailand	Patani United Liberation Organisation	None	South Thailand insurgency	1968		
Thailand	Runda Kumpulan Kecil	None	South Thailand insurgency	2000	Rorhing Ahsong	
Turkey	Islamic Party of Kurdistan	None	Kurdish–Turkish conflict	1979	Muhammad Salih Mustafa	
Turkey	Kurdistan Communities Union	None	Kurdish–Turkish conflict	2005	Abdullah Öcalan	
Turkey	Kurdistan Freedom Hawks	None	Kurdish–Turkish conflict	2004		
Turkey	Communist Party of Turkey/Marxist–Leninist (Maoist Party Centre)	None	Maoist insurgency in Turkey	1987		
Turkey	Great Eastern Islamic Raiders' Front	None		1970		
Turkey	Peoples' United Revolutionary Movement	Communist Labour Party of Turkey/Leninist; Communist Party of Turkey/Marxist–Leninist; Maoist Communist Party; Marxist–Leninist Communist Party; Marxist–Leninist Armed Propaganda Unit	Kurdish–Turkish conflict; Maoist insurgency in Turkey	2016		
Turkey	Revolutionary People's Liberation Party/Front	None	DHKP/C insurgency in Turkey; Maoist insurgency in Turkey	1994		
Uganda	Uganda Coalition for Change (UCFC)	None		2021		
United Kingdom	Arm na Poblachta	None	Dissident Irish republican campaign	2017		
United Kingdom	Real Ulster Freedom Fighters	None	Dissident Irish republican campaign	2007		
Yemen	Houthi movement	Supreme Political Council	Yemeni Civil War (2014–present); Yemeni Crisis (2011–present)	1994	Abdul-Malik Badreddin al-Houthi	

== Groups that control territory ==
Groups that "control territory" are defined as any group that hold any populated or inhabited town, city, village, or defined area that is under the direct administration or military control of the group. Such control may be contested and might be temporary or fluctuating, especially under the circumstance of conflict. It does not include the governments of stable breakaway states or other states with limited recognition.

== See also ==
- List of rebel groups that control territory
- List of guerrilla movements
- List of designated terrorist organizations
- List of ongoing military conflicts
- Lists of active separatist movements
- Violent non-state actor
