= Bersatu (separatist organization) =

- President: Wan Kadir Che Man
- Founded: 1989
- Dissolved: mid-2000s
- Headquarters: Kedah, Malaysia
- Ideology: Patani nationalism Separatism

Party flag

Bersatu (Malay for "Unity" or "Solidarity"), also referred to as the Patani Malays People's Consultative Council (Malay: Majelis Permesyuaratan Rakyat Melayu Patani, MPRMP) was an umbrella group of separatist organisations of the predominantly Muslim and Malay provinces of Southern Thailand ("Patani").

== History ==
Bersatu, which is the Malay word for "unity," was formed as an umbrella organisation in an attempt to unify all separatist groups operating against the Kingdom of Thailand. It was established on 31 August 1989 by factions of the Barisan Revolusi Nasional Melayu Patani (BRN), the National Front for the Liberation of Pattani (BNPP), the Mujahideen Pattani Movement (BNP) and the Patani United Liberation Organisation (PULO). The core of BRN denies that it ever joined Bersatu. Under the banner of "Bersatu", the PULO, New PULO (that had broken away in 1995) and BRN began coordinated attacks, using the codename "Falling Leaves," between August 1997 and January 1998, including bombing, incendiary and shooting, resulting in nine deaths, dozens of injured and substantial economic damage.

It was reported that some of Bersatu's prominent leaders were arrested or killed during the years prior to 2004. The highly coordinated torching of 18 schools in January 2004 led some to suspect that the Bersatu groups were responsible. In the mid-2000s however the coalition was disbanded. According to former president Wan Kadir Che Man, it was sidelined by younger, more extremist Islamist fighters.

Bersatu is not to be confused with Barisan Bersatu Mujahidin Patani (BBMP; "United Mujahideen Front of Pattani"), a radical breakaway from the BNPP, established in 1985, which follows a radically Islamist ideology. The BBMP never was a part of Bersatu.

== See also ==
- Gerakan Mujahidin Islam Patani (GMIP)
- Pattani (region)
- South Thailand insurgency
