= 2005 Songkhla bombings =

Terrorist incident in Thailand

The 2005 Songkhla bombings were a series of three bombings that took place on 3 April 2005 in the cities of Hat Yai and Songkhla of Thailand's Songkhla Province. They are believed to be part of the ongoing South Thailand insurgency. At least two people were killed and 66 were injured in the explosions.

No one claimed responsibility for the blasts, but they may be linked to the Patani United Liberation Organisation (PULO), which has been an active participant in the South Thailand insurgency in Narathiwat, Pattani, and Yala. The attacks in Songkhla Province may have suggested that insurgent activity was expanding, or simply that security in Songkhla province was more lax than in the three southern provinces. The bombings, drive-by shootings, and machete attacks in southern Thailand began in January 2004, and by April 2005 had resulted in over 600 deaths. Thai officials denied that the bombings were linked with the southern insurgency.

== Description ==
The explosions took place between 20:00 to 20:30. A bomb planted in a garbage bin exploded in front of a Carrefour store in Hat Yai, injuring five and causing minor damage to the building. Shortly after, a bomb inside a bag exploded at the departure hall of Hat Yai International Airport, killing two, injuring 47, and causing some damage to the building. Later, a bomb planted on a motorcycle exploded in front of the Green World Hotel in Songkhla without causing any injuries, deaths or damage to the building.

At least two people were killed and 66 were injured in the blasts; one man was killed instantly in one of the explosions while a woman sustained serious injuries and died later, both were of Thai nationality. Of the 66 people injured, 60 were Thais, one was an American, one was French, two were from Brunei, and two were Malaysian. Many were seriously injured, and several were in critical condition.

The dynamite and fertiliser bombs were set off by a mobile phone. Images from the Hat Yai airport's closed-circuit television indicated that the bomb was hidden in a man's luggage.

Immediately following the bombings, security was heightened in the surrounding areas, in Bangkok, and at airports throughout the country. The attacks prompted some to emigrate from the violence-torn southern region of the country, and others to cancel their travel plans to the area. The Hat Yai airport was closed for six months following the bombings.

== In popular culture ==
- Modernine TV discussed 2001 and 2005 Songkhla bombings on TimeLine, 29 February 2016, in "The hunt...city bombing".

== See also ==
- 2006 Hat Yai bombings
- Gerakan Mujahidin Islam Patani (GMIP)
