= Gerakan =

Gerakan, meaning movement in Malay, can refer to:

- Parti Gerakan Rakyat Malaysia, a Malaysian political party
- Gerakan Pramuka Indonesia, an Indonesian scouting movement
- Gerakan Mujahidin Islam Patani (GMIP), also known as the Pattani Islamic Mujahideen Movement, a Malay-Muslim terrorist group from southern Thailand
