= 2017 Pattani bombing =

Terrorist incident in Thailand

- Part of the South Thailand Insurgency
- Location: 6.862048°N 101.231419°E; Pattani, Pattani Province, Thailand
- Date: 9 May 2017; 9 years ago 02:50 PM Thailand time (UTC+07:00)
- Target: Civilians
- Attack type: Car bomb
- Weapon: Improvised explosive device
- Deaths: 0
- Injuries: 80 (4 seriously)
- Perpetrator: Barisan Revolusi Nasional (suspected)

On 9 May 2017, two bombs exploded at a Big C supermarket in Pattani, Thailand. 56 people were injured, two seriously. Two men, alleged by police to be Pattani Muslim separatists, were convicted and sentenced to life in prison for the attack.

== Attack ==
The attack took place around 2:50 PM Thai time (07:50 UTC) on 10 May with the detonation of a bomb on a motorcycle near the entrance at the Big C supermarket. 10 minutes later, a second blast a larger and more powerful explosion outside the building entrance, from pickup truck carrying two gas cylinders with explosives weighing about 100 kg.

56 people were injured, four seriously including a child, and no deaths were reported. Most of the wounded received treatment at the scene, but 21 people were taken to hospital with serious injuries.

The same shopping centre had been bombed twice before, in 2005 and 2012.

== Suspects ==
The police have said three groups of six people were involved in the bombings. A massive manhunt was launched for four men who were allegedly involved in the twin blasts.The police killed one suspect and arrested two others in a shootout at a mosque.

The police initially said the attackers had suspected links to Barisan Revolusi Nasional. They have also alleged that the attackers had ties to Bakong Pittaya School in Pattani, and that a December 2017 raid on the school turned up bomb making supplies and anti-government and rebel material.

In September 2018 the two men, including one were convicted and sentenced to death, commuted to life imprisonment, for the attack. Another suspect was killed by Thai security forces in 2020. Warrants remain outstanding for others.

Filmmaker Bhandavis Depchand made a short documentary called Journey of Isolation (2018) about suspect Pauji Tasamoh, based on interviews with his family.

== See also ==
- South Thailand insurgency
