= 2006 Hat Yai bombings =

Terrorist incident in Thailand

- Part of Southern Thailand insurgency
- Location: Hat Yai, Thailand
- Date: 16 September 2006; 9:30PM – Unknown (UTC+7)
- Target: Various
- Attack type: multiple bombings
- Deaths: 5
- Injuries: 82
- Perpetrator: suspected insurgents

The 2006 Hat Yai bombings took place in Hat Yai, Songkhla Province, Thailand on 16 September 2006 and are believed to be part of the ongoing South Thailand insurgency. At least five people were killed and 82 were injured. The attacks were similar to the 2005 Songkhla bombings.

== Attack ==
At around 9:30 p.m., six bombs were detonated in the Ocean Department Store, in front of the Brown Sugar Pub, a car parking building, a Big C shopping mall, the Lee Gardens Hotel and the Diana Department Store. The bombs were planted on motorcycles and were triggered by mobile phone. This later caused Thai authorities to turn off the mobile phone network to prevent any more explosions.

The attacks had marred a day which was supposed to have been dominated by a military peace rally held in the south.

== Casualties ==
Among those killed were a Malaysian, a Canadian and three Thais. A number of other civilians were injured and taken to the hospital where some officials complained that there was not enough blood for them, as the Xinhua news agency reported. Injured civilians totalled up to 82, including 14 foreigners. Those injured foreigners included six Malaysians, three Singaporeans and Britons, an Indian, and an American.

Deaths by nationality
Country	Number
Thailand	3
Malaysia	1
Canada	1
Total	5

== Suspects ==
It is assumed that the South Thailand insurgency carried out the attacks. While no terrorist organisation took responsibility for the bombings, General Thammarak Isarangkura na Ayudhaya indicated that Thai authorities had expected bomb attacks in Hat Yai sometime between 16 and 20 September to mark the first anniversary of the Gerakan Mujahidin Islam Patani (GMIP) separatist movement, which is a splinter group of the Gerakan Mujahidin Patani (GMP).

== See also ==
- 2005 Songkhla bombings
- South Thailand insurgency
