= Guardians of Truth Battalions =

Iraqi Shiite militant group

- کتائب أولياء الحق
- Dates active: 24 January 2025—Present
- Country: Iraq Syria
- Ideology: Assadism Shia Islamism
- Wars: Syrian civil war; Eastern Syria insurgency

Guardians of Truth Battalions (Arabic: کتائب أولياء الحق, romanized: Katāʼib awliyāʼ al-Ḥaqq) is an Assadist and Assad Loyalist Iraqi militant group fighting against the Syrian Transitional Government.

== History ==
The Guardians of Truth Battalions was established on 25 January 2025, after an announcement of their creation against what they call "takfiri" militant organizations like Hay'at Tahrir al-Sham and the Islamic State in order to defend Shia Muslims and Alawites. On 4 February 2025, Guardians of Truth Battalions released their first video statement showing support for Iran and Hezbollah in Syria.
