= Gerakan Mujahidin Islam Patani =

Islamist militant insurgent group

Pattani Islamic Mujahideen Movement
- Gerakan Mujahidin Islam Patani
- Leader: Nasoree Saesang
- Dates active: 1995 – present
- Active regions: Southern Thailand
- Ideology: Separatism; Islamism
- Wars: the South Thailand insurgency

The Pattani Islamic Mujahideen Movement (Malay: Gerakan Mujahidin Islam Patani; GMIP) is an Islamist militant insurgent group that has carried out violent actions as part of the protracted insurgency in Southern Thailand.

GMIP is hostile to the practices of moderate Malay Muslims, accusing them of being un-Islamic. It is one of the most extreme terrorist groups currently operating in Southern Thailand. A shadowy leader named 'Jehkumir Kuteh' or 'Abdul Rahman Ahmad', among other names, was assumed at a certain point to lead the group, and Thailand's prime minister demanded from Malaysia his extradition in January 2005, but the Malaysian government refused.

== History ==
Originally, in the 1990 decade GMIP had the establishment of a local Islamic state in Pattani as its main agenda. However, according to Thai military authorities, this group and the Barisan Revolusi Nasional (BRN) were revived after 2001 by the Terengganu-based Kumpulan Mujahidin Malaysia and have currently more hard-line Islamic political goals, to the detriment of their former nationalist cause. Its members are now believed to have sympathies with Al Qaeda and with the establishment of the Islamic Caliphate.

Unlike previous Islamic insurgent groups of the region, the characteristic of this outfit in its new avatar is that it attacks forcefully and does not claim responsibility, and also that it keeps its leadership shrouded in secrecy. GMIP was accused by the Thai authorities as the main instigator of the series of bombings, drive-by shootings and machete attacks in Southern Thailand that began in January 2004.

Although its headquarters are unknown, many of the operations of the GMIP suggest that it is rural-based. The Thai military have linked the GMIP to attacks on convoys and policemen in roads crossing rural districts.

This terrorist group has also been suspected by Thai officials of being behind the 2006 Hat Yai bombings as well as more recently the 2012 Southern Thailand bombings.

== See also ==
- South Thailand insurgency
