= Islamic Party of Kurdistan =

Kurdish political organisation

Islamic Party of Kurdistan (Kurdish: Partiya Îslamiya Kurdistan) is a Kurdish (Sunni) Islamist organisation established in 1979 and led-by Muhammad Salih Mustafa. Other prominent names of the organisation include Hamit Turgut (deceased), Osman Caner and Sukuti Evcim. Turkish authorities claims that the organisation which is targeting mainly Turkey is active in Iraq, United States and Europe.

== Doctrine ==
The Kurdish Islamic Party's main target is to establish an Islamic government. The members of the organisation see this target as a holy mission. The first activities of the organisation were community meetings as Islamic ideological and nationalistic propaganda. However, to establish the Islam state, the members began to be armed. Their strategy is, through creating a chaotic condition in Turkey, to destabilise the governmental institutions and to start a nationwide revolt.

The 22 point statute of the Islamic Party of Kurdistan states that the organisation is a part of the international Islamic movement established in order to defend and advance the rights of the Kurdish people and make Kurdistan an Islamic land by finally establishing an Islamic Government of Kurdistan. The statute emphasizes values such as family, equality of men and women, liberty, justice, and wisdom.

== Co-operation ==
Islamic Party of Kurdistan co-operates with other organisations that share similar aims. In 1999 it formed the National Platform of North Kurdistan along with the Socialist Party of Kurdistan, the Communist Party of Kurdistan, the Liberation Party of Kurdistan, the Patriotic Union of Kurdistan (PUK) and the Kurdistan Workers Party (PKK). The Platform issued a statement titled "Urgent Demands For A Peaceful Solution To The Kurdish Problem" on 10 January 1999. According to a bill of indictment prepared by Diyarbakır Chief Attorney of Republic in Turkey PKK is currently co-operating with the Islamic Party of Kurdistan among other organisations in order to use religion to re-gain influence in southeastern Turkey.

== See also ==
- Kurdish Hezbollah
- Kurdistan Islamic Movement (Turkey)
- List of illegal political parties in Turkey
