= Patani (historical region) =

Historical region of the northern Malay Peninsula

Coordinates: 6°45′N 100°25′E

Patani Darussalam كسلطانن ڤطاني دارالسلام ปตานี
- Historical region
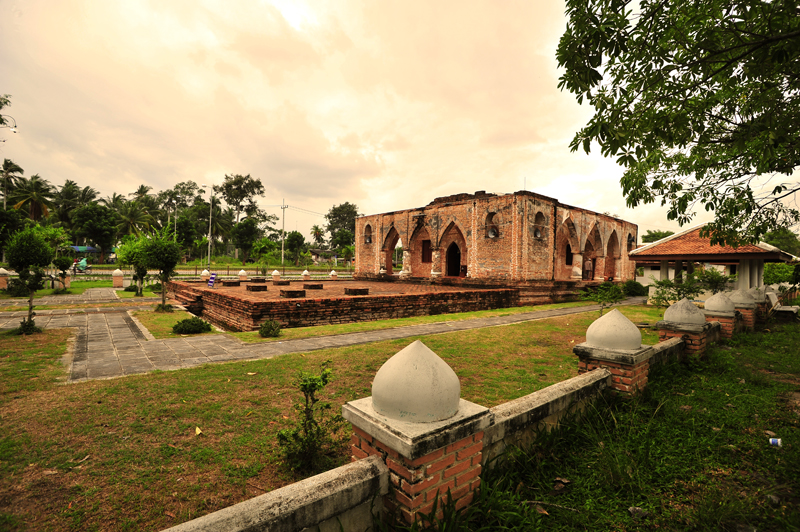
- View of Krue Se Mosque, an ancient mosque in the Patani region.

- Flag

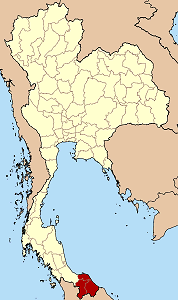
- Map of the Patani region in the strict sense
- Countries: Thailand, Malaysia

Patani Darussalam (Malay: Kesultanan Patani Darussalam, Jawi: كسلطانن ڤطاني دارالسلام, also sometimes Patani Raya or Patani Besar, Greater Patani; Thai: ปตานี) is a historical region and sultanate in the Malay Peninsula. It includes the southern Thai provinces of Pattani, Yala (Jala), Narathiwat (Menara), and also parts of Malaysia modern state Kelantan and Besut district in state of Terengganu. Its capital was the town of Patani.

The Patani region has historical affinities with the Singgora (Songkhla), Ligor (Nakhon Si Thammarat), Lingga (near Surat Thani) and Kelantan sultanates dating back to the time when the Patani Kingdom was a semi-independent Malay sultanate paying tribute to the Siamese kingdoms of Sukhothai and Ayutthaya. After Ayutthaya fell to the Burmese in 1767, the Sultanate of Patani gained full independence, but under King Rama I, it again came under Siam's control.

In recent years, a secessionist movement has sought the establishment of a Malay Islamic state, Patani Darussalam, encompassing the three southern and parts of Songkhla Thai provinces. This campaign has taken a particularly violent turn after 2001, resulting in an intractable insurgency across southern Thailand and the imposition of martial law.

== Name ==
=== Founding legend ===
According to legend, the founder of Patani was a raja from Kota Malikha named Phaya Tunakpa. Phaya Tunakpa went hunting one day and saw a beautiful albino mouse-deer the size of a goat, which then disappeared. He asked his men where the animal had gone, and they replied: "Pata ni lah!" ("This beach!" in the Patani Malay language). They searched for the mouse-deer but found instead an old man fishing, who identified himself as Che' Tani. The old man said that he was sent by the raja's grandfather to build a new town further beyond but had fallen ill on the journey; as he could not go any further, he stayed at that place. The raja later ordered a town be built at the site where the mouse-deer had disappeared. The town became Patani, which is believed to be named either after "this beach" where the mouse-deer had disappeared, or the old man as Pak Tani meaning "Father Tani".

=== Patani, Pattani ===
In Thailand's southernmost provinces, "Patani" has become a controversial term used to refer to the area encompassing the provinces of Pattani (with two t's), Yala, Narathiwat, and parts of Songkhla, mostly inhabited by Malay Muslims. Patani in Malay is written with one "t", but in Thai sources with two "t"s. When written in Thai, "Patani" (ปตานี) "pa-ta-ni" sounds markedly different from "Pattani" (ปัตตานี) "pat-ta-ni". Malays say P’tani (ปตานี), pronounced as "pa-ta-ni" with a very brief first syllable and stress on the second syllable. "P'tani", the original Malay word for the region, has been used for a long time and is usually never written in Thai. So while technically being the same word as "P'tani", "Patani" with one "t" has a certain separatist political connotation.

== Culture ==
From the cultural point of view the term "Patani" may refer to the territories of the historical Sultanate of Patani, as well as to the wider areas that were once under its rule.

=== Cultural background: Patani traditions ===
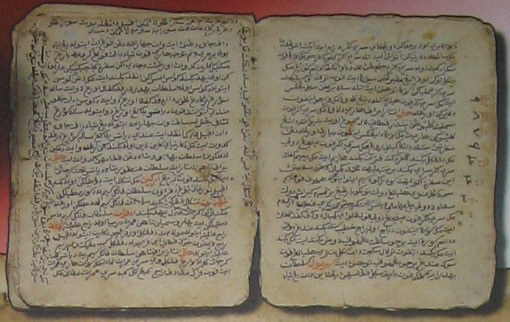
The Hikayat Patani chronicle of the Patani Kingdom.

The inhabitants of the Patani region have been traditionally part of the Malay culture, having a historical background in which Islam has constituted a major influence.

The Patani people speak Kelantan-Pattani Malay, a form of the Malay language. Patani had a complex and distinct culture that included a rich oral literature, rice harvest ceremonies, colourful paintings on the hulls of Korlae boats, and the performances of a kind of Wayang theatre. Living in a borderland at the northern end of the Malay Peninsula, over the centuries the Patani people adapted themselves to a life of harmony with the local Chinese, Buddhist, Indian, Arab and Orang Asli communities.

Despite the ethnic affinity of the Patani with their Malay neighbours to the south, the Patani Kingdom was led by sultans who historically preferred to pay tribute to the distant Siamese kings in Bangkok. For many centuries the King of Siam restricted himself to exacting a periodic tribute in the form of Bunga mas, ritual trees with gold leaves and flowers that were a symbolic acknowledgment of Siamese suzerainty, leaving the Patani rulers largely alone.

=== The 20th century: forced assimilation ===
Until well into the 20th century, the government in Bangkok had relied on local officials in the implementation of policies within the Patani region, including the exemption in implementing Thai Civil Law, which had allowed Muslims to continue their observance of local laws based on Islam regarding issues on inheritance and family. However, by 1934 Marshall Plaek Phibunsongkhram set in motion of a process of Thaification which had as its objective the cultural assimilation of the Patani people, among other ethnic groups in Thailand.

The National Culture Act was enforced as a result of the Thaification process, promoting the concept of 'Thai-ness' and its centralist aims. Its "Mandate 3" was directly aimed at the Patani people. By 1944, Thai civil law was enforced throughout the land including the Patani region over-riding the earlier concessions to local Islamic administrative practices. The school curriculum was revised to that of a Thai-centric one with all lessons in the Thai language. Traditional Muslim courts that were used to handle civil cases were removed and replaced with civil courts run and approved by the central government in Bangkok. This forced assimilation process and the perceived imposition of Thai-Buddhist cultural practices upon their society became an irritant for the harmonious relationship of the ethnic Malay Patani people and the Thai state.

Denied recognition as a culturally separate ethnic minority, Patani leaders reacted against the Thai government policy towards them and a nationalist movement began to grow, leading to the Southern Thailand insurgency. Initially the goal of the nationalist movement such as the Patani United Liberation Organisation (PULO) was secession, pursuing an armed struggle towards an independent state where Patani people could live with dignity without having alien cultural values imposed on them.

=== The 21st century: traditional culture under threat ===
After 2001, the Patani insurgency was taken over by groups whose leaders are mainly Salafist religious teachers who have promoted religion, rejecting the nation-building ideology of the early secessionist movements. Current insurgent groups proclaim militant jihadism and are not separatist any more. They have extreme and transnational religious goals, such as an Islamic Caliphate, to the detriment of a constructive cultural or nationalistic Patani identity. Salafi-based groups are hostile to the heritage and practices of traditional Malay Muslims, accusing them of being un-Islamic. They are not concerned about Patani cultural values, instead their immediate aim is to make the Patani region ungovernable.

So far, and in the present circumstances, to preserve an identity free of the influence of Militant Islam has been highly challenging for the people of the Patani Region. The activity of the present-day insurgents has changed the face of Patani society by the imposition of religious undercurrents and the enforcement of the Salafi rules on local people.

== History ==
=== Early history ===
The area was home to the Hindu-Buddhist kingdom of Langkasuka as early as the second century, as accounts from Chinese travellers attest. Langkasuka reached its peak in the sixth and seventh centuries, and then declined as a major trade center. Pattani subsequently became part of the Hindu-Buddhist Empire of Srivijaya, a maritime confederation based in Palembang, which spanned the seventh to the thirteenth centuries. Regional influence during these early centuries also came from the developing Khmer, Siamese and Malay cultures.

The founding of the Islamic kingdom of Patani is thought to have been around the mid-13th century, with folklore suggesting it was named after an exclamation made by Sultan Ismail Shah, "Pantai Ini!" ("This beach" in the local Malay language). However, some think it was the same country known to the Chinese as Pan Pan.

=== Siamese rule ===
Patani came under Thai rule briefly during the Sukhothai period, and more extensively during the later Ayuthaya period.

In 1791 and 1808, there were rebellions within Pattani against Thai rule, following which Pattani was divided into 7 largely autonomous states (Mueang): Pattani, Nongchik, Saiburi (Teluban), Yala (Jala), Yaring (Jambu), Ra-ngae (Legeh) and Raman. All were ruled by the King of Ligor.

In 1909 Great Britain and Thailand signed the Bangkok Treaty of 1909. The British recognised Thailand's sovereignty over Pattani, and, in return, Thailand gave up the kingdoms of Kedah, Kelantan, Perlis and Terengganu to the British. All seven mueang were reunited into a monthon and incorporated into the kingdom. Later, the central government in Bangkok renamed certain localities with Thai versions of their names and merged some of the mueang.

When the monthon system was dissolved in 1933, three provinces remained: Pattani, Yala and Narathiwat.

=== Greater Malay Patani state ===
On 8 December 1941, during the Second World War, the Japanese invaded Thailand, and crossed Pattani to invade British Malaya. The Thai government, led by Marshall Plaek Phibunsongkhram became an active ally of Japan by promising to help Thailand retake some territorial claims back from the British and the French. This included Sirat Malai, the former Malay dependencies of Kelantan, Trengganu, Kedah, and Perlis. It is arguable that this move not only gave more territory to the Thai state but on the contrary, it strengthened the old Malay ties between the Pattani region and the northern Malayan peninsula states.

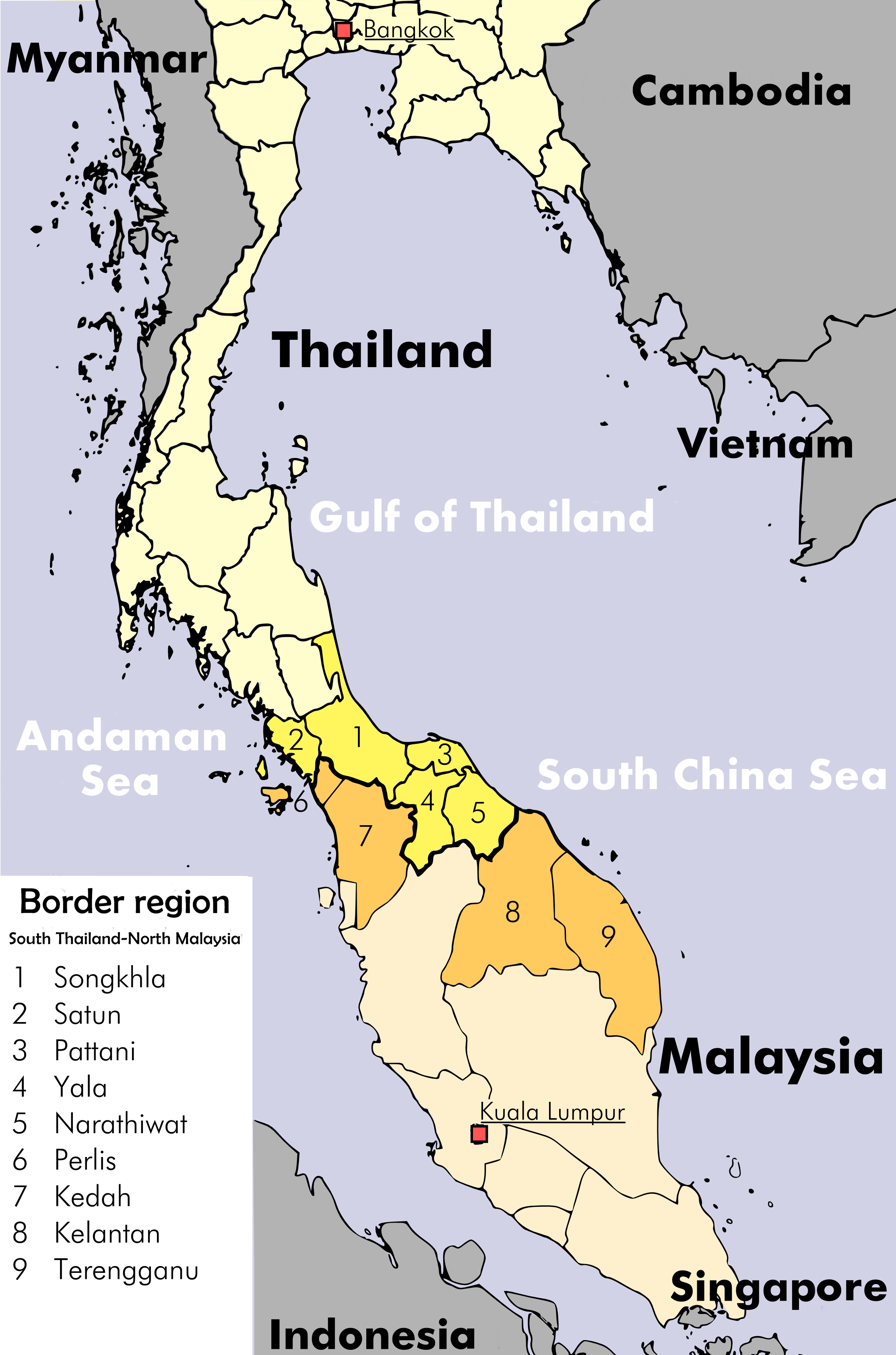
Malay Muslim provinces in Southern Thailand with northern Malaysia.

Tengku Mahmood Mahyideen, a prominent Pattani leader and the son of the last Raja of Pattani, allied himself with the British in the hopes that Pattani would be granted independence after an Allied victory. His main support came from ethnic Malays displeased by the nationalistic policies of the Phibun regime, which were seen by the southern Malays as forcing them to give up their own language and culture and the economic hardship that ensued as a result of alleged mismanagement. According to Ockey, even leading Thai politicians such as Pridi Phanomyong and Seni Pramot were among those that "overtly or covertly" supported this resistance against the Japanese. During this time the electoral seats for in this region were mainly held by non-Muslim representatives except Satun. Mahyuddin assisted the British by launching guerrilla attacks against the Japanese. In 1945, a petition by Malay leaders led by Tengku Abdul Jalal demanded that Britain guarantee independence for the southernmost provinces of Thailand. At the war's end, the Greater Malay Pattani State (Negara Melayu Patani Raya) flag did fly briefly in Pattani. However, since the British had no power over Thailand, the Thai continued to rule over Pattani, while the British kept Thailand stable as a counterweight to the communist insurgency in Malaya. This led to the formation of several insurgent groups seeking the independence of Pattani.

After World War II had ended, the US had wanted to treat Thailand as an ally because of the resistance movement against the Japanese during the war but the British on the other hand had wanted to treat it as a defeated enemy. With this notion in the balance, the newly elected government led by Pridi had to address the issue of the South. With the aid of advisor Chaem Phromyong, a Muslim, the government began policies of accommodation and integration of the South. With the closure of the war, the government also approved the Patronage of Islam Act. This act recognised the work and role of religious figures in the South and gave them authority once more in the affairs of the Muslims in that region. Coincidentally, this act also paved the way for Haji Sulong to become the president of the Pattani Islamic Committee in 1945. It was from this appointment that Sulong began to take an interest in the restoration of the Islamic courts which had earlier been abolished by the Phibun regime. Ockey points out that Sulong was not entirely pleased with the restoration process because the authority in the Islamic courts was still preceded by the presence of a judge from the Ministry of Justice alongside the Muslim judge in cases. However, the negotiations over this supposed unhappiness was in the form of meetings to discuss terms and not open confrontation. These peaceful attempts at resolution would all come to an end in November 1947 when Pridi was forced out of power by opposing army personnel.

=== Secessionist movements in Patani ===
During World War II, along with the Greater Patani Malay Movement led by Tengku Mahmood Mahyideen, another resistance force under the leadership of Islamic scholar Haji Sulong Tokmina also fought against the Japanese. Their stated goal was to create an Islamic republic in Patani, which frequently put it at odds with Prince Tengku Mahmood, who wanted to reestablish the Pattanese Sultanate.

Haji Sulong had emerged at a time when the region of Pattani was in need of new political direction. His appearance supposedly gave new light to the nationalistic intents of the Malays in the region based on Islamic principles. Haji Sulong was born in 1895 to a family in Kampong Anak Rhu. He had completed his Islamic studies locally before being sent by his father to further education in Mecca, Saudi Arabia. There in Mecca, he apparently met up with and studied with famous Islamic scholars and teachers. He even opened a school in Mecca and had students from all over the world study under him. Eventually he married and settled in Mecca. During this period, there was a wave of nationalism sweeping the world in the earlier part of the 20th century and Sulong himself was exposed to Arab nationalism. Sulong's return to Pattani happened almost by chance due to the death of his first infant son to alleviate the grief of his family.

Upon his return, he had apparently looked upon the plight of the Pattani region being a distant shadow of its former glory as the 'cradle of Islam' in Southeast Asia. According to Thai historian Thanet, this notion set him into action. From teaching in a khru (small Muslim village school), he eventually opened up a pondok to spread his teachings due to his popularity amongst villagers. Even Pridi Phanomyong visited Haji Sulong at his school and it soon became the most popular Islamic school in Thailand. According to Thanet, the rise of Islamic nationalism in the South is not only attributed to Haji Sulong himself but also the religious students who 'were inclined towards modernism' from the northern states in Malaya. Haji Sulong was an ulama who openly distrusted the government's involvement in the religious affairs of the community. His conviction in the matter stemmed from his ideal that a community cannot be established in the south as long as it is solely under Thai rule.

On 3 April 1947, a commission of inquiry by the Bangkok government was sent to the four Muslim states in the South to check on the apparent plight of the Muslims living there. It was during this time that the Provincial Islamic Council of Pattani drafted out a seven-point demand to the central government in Bangkok which sought for the betterment of Muslims in the region. According to Thanet, the commission of inquiry pointed to Haji Sulong as the leader behind the conceptualisation of this demands. Prime Minister Thamrong brought the seven point demand for consideration with his cabinet and then decided that they could not be met because he felt that the existing structure of the Bangkok government was still (then) adequate to govern the Pattani region. He concluded that an exclusive reorganisation of the governmental structure in the area to suit the people there would then "divide the country".

By the late part of 1947, Haji Sulong and his supporters realised that their efforts with the government to negotiate better terms for the Muslims in the south was not working. They then decided to adopt a policy of non-co-operation and this included the boycott of the January 1948 elections. Moreover, at this time, the Pridi government had been ousted in a coup by the military which meant a return to the old rigid ways towards the southern states. During this period, Haji Sulong and his associates were arrested and charged for treason. This was a move purported by Phibun even though he was not back yet in power according to Thanet's research (Phibun returned to power a few months after in April 1948). This arrests were soon followed by clashes between Muslim villagers and the police/military forces at Duson Nyior. This event was known was the Dusun Nyior Incident which was led by a religious leader by the name of Haji Abdul Rahman. The ensuing violence involved over 1000 men in open battle and led to the deaths of an estimated 400 Malay Muslim peasants and 30 policemen. After the clashes had been settled, there was an exodus of Malays across the border to Malaya. There was even a petition by the Pattani Muslims to the United Nations to step in to broker the separation of the southern states to join the Federation of Malaya.

While on trial, the court provided many descriptions of the alleged activities that Haji Sulong had carried out to incite unrest amongst the people. This include accusations that he held meetings which invoked "arousing rebellious feelings among the people almost to the point of creating unrest in the kingdom". According to Thanet, the most serious accusation was that he incited the people to seek for self-government with the intention of inviting Tengku Mahmood Mahyideen, who was the son of the last raja of Pattani, to preside as leader over the four southern provinces. On top of this, the prosecution also stated that Haji Sulong had recommended that Islamic law be implemented and if the government did not comply to the said demands, Haji Sulong would then urge the Malay population to make their complaints heard until the government did something about it. Haji Sulong was convicted and spent time in jail until 1952 and after his release, he was ordered by the government to give up his public activities and subject himself to checks by the police on demand. The prosecutor in that trial wanted to press for a heavier sentence, citing evidence that Haji Sulong was planning something bigger to the scale of a rebellion. Originally as a result of the state's prosecution citing these evidences, the sentence had been longer but due to the willingness of Haji Sulong to co-operate in the investigations, the court reduced the sentence to four years and eight months. In 1954, Haji Sulong, his eldest son Ahmad and some of his associates were told to report to a police station at Songkhla. Upon leaving to report to the station, they were never seen or heard from again. After his disappearance, his family inquired about his whereabouts but never got any answers. In 1957, his son Ameen Tokmina ran for parliament in the elections in the hope that a position in the government could help him look for more information.

Today, the goals and ideas of Haji Sulong Tokmina are still carried on by minor resistance groups interested in creating an Islamic republic. After the war, though, British and Thai policies essentially removed the possibility of an independent republic in Pattani. The British originally had the intention to deliver on their promise to the anti-Japanese Malay leaders in Southern Thailand that they would either create an independent territory out of the Malay-based southern Thai states or incorporate them in British Malaya as a punishment of Thailand for aiding the Japanese conquest of Malaya and profiting from it. However, they were dissuaded by the USA who needed Thai rice to feed the war-ravaged region and Thai friendship to face up to the possibility of China's fall to the Chinese communist army.

=== Current insurgency ===
Patani separatist groups, most notably the Barisan Revolusi Nasional-Koordinasi (BRN-C), began to use increasingly violent tactics after 2001. There have been suggestions of links between the BRN-C and foreign Islamist groups, such as Jemaah Islamiyah, however the strength of these relationships remains unknown.

== See also ==
- Muslim Southeast Asia
- Patani Kingdom
- Sirat Malai
