= Mansur Selum =

Syrian politician

Mansur Selum منصور سلوم
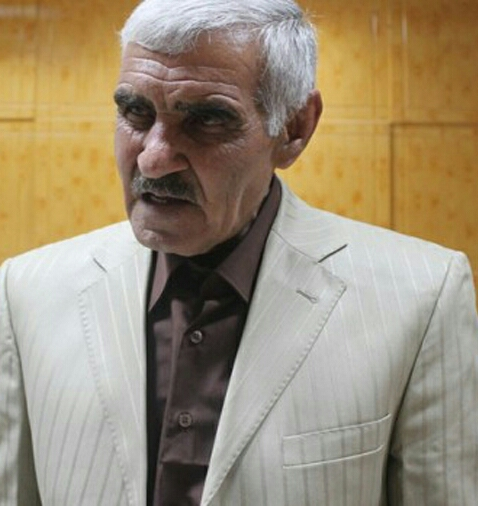
- Selum in 2016

Co-president of the Executive Council
- In office March 2016 – 20 August 2026 Serving with Îlham Ehmed
- Preceded by: Position established
- Succeeded by: Position abolished

Personal details
- Party: Democratic Union Party
- Occupation: Politician

Mansur Selum (Arabic: منصور سلوم) is a Syrian politician. He served as co-president of the Executive Council of Rojava from 2016 until its integration into the Syrian state in 2026. Selum served alongside fellow co-president Îlham Ehmed, an ethnic Kurd.

Selum, a local Arab tribal leader in the town of Tell Abyad, had risen into a prominent political role after June 2015 when Syrian Democratic Forces (SDF) wrested control of Tell Abyad from the Islamic State of Iraq and the Levant (ISIL) and the town was declared part of the de facto autonomous Federation of Northern Syria – Rojava by a council including representatives of local Arab, Kurdish, Turkmen and Armenian communities. In July, the 178-member higher council that then governed Tell Abyad had elected mixed-gender co-mayors, as mandated under Rojava rules, initially Selum and ethnic Kurd Layla Mohammed, the latter 27 years old and the first female mayor of Tell Abyad ever. While previously education had been available only in Arabic language, thereafter Arabic and Kurdish were used as languages of instruction in public schools and plans introduced for offering Turkish in addition; one focus of the administration was to encourage women to seek higher education.
