= Muhammad Salih Mustafa =

Muhammad Salih Mustafa is the Party President and General Emir of the Islamic Party of Kurdistan (PIK), a Kurdish, militant Islamist group, fighting to establish an Islamic State of Kurdistan in South-Eastern Turkey.

== See also ==
- Hüseyin Velioğlu
- Mullah Krekar
