= Haji Sulong =

Pattani religious teacher and community leader (1895–disappeared 1954)

- حاج سولوڠ
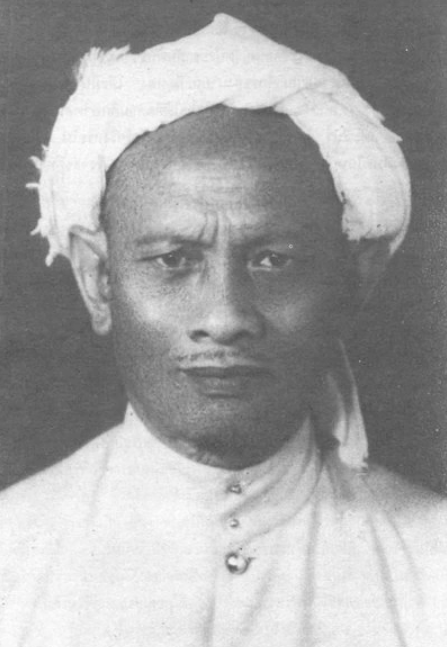
- Born: Sulong Abdulkadir al-Fatani; 1895; Kampong Anoru, Pattani Kingdom
- Disappeared: 13 August 1954 (aged 58–59); Songkhla Police Station, Thailand
- Status: Missing for 72 years, 2 months and 27 days
- Occupations: Imam; educator; activist; politician

Haji Sulong Abdulkadir al-Fatani (Jawi: سولوڠ عبدالقادر الفطاني; Thai: หะยีสุหลง อับดุลกาเดร์, RTGS: Hayi Sulong Apdunkade; 1895 – disappeared 13 August 1954), also known as Haji Sulong Tomina or Hajji Sulong (Jawi: حاج سولوڠ), was a Patani religious teacher and reformist. He advocated for greater recognition of the Malay community in response to General Phibunsongkhram's ideology of 'Thainess' linking Thai civic identity with adherence to Buddhism and speaking Thai whilst positioning certain ethnic groups such as the Tai as superior, and his related assimilationist policies enacted across Thailand.

Haji Sulong's proposals for reforms in education and public administration in South Thailand were met with resistance from the central government of Thailand and was disappeared as a result. Despite attempts to place a violent image on him by Thai government, he became a significant figure in Malay self-determination; separatists consider him an major figure to their involvement in the southern Thailand insurgency, a conflict that is still ongoing.

== Early life ==
=== Formative years ===
Sulong Abdulkadir al-Fatani was born in 1895 to a family of religious leaders. He attended Pondok Hajji Abdul Rashid in Kampung Sungei Pandang, Patani (hence his nisbah الفطاني al-Fatani, 'the Pattanite'). At age 12, Sulong performed the hajj, a journey considered a luxury for most at that time. He pursued religious education, initially through informal study at the grand mosque, followed by secondary education, which qualified him for formal university education in Egypt. While in Mecca, he met with several esteemed Arab religious scholars influenced by Muhammad Abduh.

During Sulong's lifetime, the Muslim world was undergoing reform. Following the decline of the Ottomans and the rise of the Young Turks, there was a push for Islam to become more progressive and integrate with secularism. This shift gave rise to two prominent movements: the Wahhabism movement associated with the Saud regime advocating preserving Islamic 'purity' by returning (or salaf) to exact practices from the time of Muhammad and his Companions' pioneering generation; and the contrasting Shafi’ites, led by the Al-Azhar University in Egypt which promotes modernist ideals, suggesting that Islamic learning should integrate seamlessly with secular subjects like science and mathematics. Haji Sulong aligned himself with the modernist movement.

=== Return to Patani ===
Following the death of his wife and son, Sulong considered either remaining in Mecca or returning to Patani. He had become disillusioned with life in Mecca and sought a short holiday in Patani, maintaining constant contact with his family throughout his stay in Mecca. Although his return was initially intended to be temporary – he was highly regarded as a scholar in Mecca and had little initial incentive to leave that community – upon returning to Patani, he observed a different practice of Islam, which he perceived was influenced by animistic beliefs and practices. He sought to change this, starting with education. Dissatisfied with the standards of the pondok schools, he began teaching privately, moving between various mosques in the area, similar to his experience with informal education in Mecca. His initiatives were met with disapproval from older generations of religious teachers, who felt he was advocating for a fundamentalist approach based on the Wahhabism movement. However, Sulong believed it was important to continue integrating secular education into religious studies. Consequently, he decided to permanently relocate from Mecca to Patani.

== Career ==
=== Beginning of activism ===
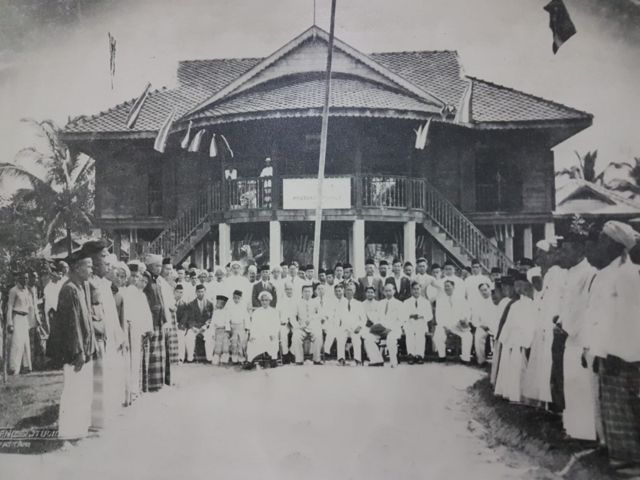
Haji Sulong and Pridi Banomyong in front of the school that Haji Sulong built from a donation from the people in 1945

A key reform advocated by Haji Sulong was the formalization of religious education. Previously, religious education primarily took place in pondok schools, which lacked an established curriculum and relied solely on the religious teacher who founded them within each community. Inspired by developments in Egypt, Haji Sulong sought to integrate religious education with secular subjects such as science, mathematics, and moral education. The madrasah system faced criticism from older religious leaders who saw it as a departure from the traditional halaqah style, adapted from the informal training they had received at Masjid al-Haram. The central government also opposed the madrasah system of education, believing it hindered their goals of integration and thus cultural assimilation of the Malay community with the majority Thai population. The central government favored public schools, which taught Thai and Buddhism alongside secular subjects, and viewed pondok schools as sufficient informal venues for religious education. However, James Ockey offers a contrasting view, noting that when Haji Sulong opened his madrasah, he invited Prime Minister Phahon during a trip to Bangkok to request funds. The central government later provided support for Haji Sulong to open his school. Although the central government did not fully endorse the alternative education model of the madrasah, they were not explicitly opposed to it. Sulong thus made some progress in formalizing religious education through the madrasah system.

Through the Madrasa system, Sulong expanded his influence within the Malay community in Patani. The challenges he faced in establishing the madrasah led Sulong towards politics. He was dissatisfied with General Phibun's policies of forced assimilation. He sought a degree of autonomy for the region, advocating for Malay to be recognized as an official language alongside Thai and for Islam to be taught in schools instead of Buddhism. This opposition to the imposed Thai identity was initially viewed as passive resistance and later contributed to active rebellion. Sulong became increasingly involved in Thai politics, feeling the need to preserve the identity of the Jawi community amidst the central government's push for assimilation. This contrasts with Thanet Aphornsuvan's portrayal of Sulong as merely an obstinate opposition leader. Both Liow and Ockey describe Sulong as a pragmatic leader who understood his objectives, suggesting he turned towards separatism only after negotiations with the central government failed.

Haji Sulong's activism achieved some success. In the aftermath of Second World War, the uncertain policies of the British prompted the Thai government to reconsider its 1932 policy of accommodation and integration. Prime Minister Pridi Banomyong even contemplated granting autonomy for South Thailand. One approved policy was the Patronage of Islam Act, which recognized the role and authority of religious leaders in South Thailand. Subsequently, Sulong was elected as the President of the Islamic committee in the Provincial Islamic Council of Patani (PICP), and his friend, Jaroen, became the mayor of Patani.

=== Move to politics ===
Motivated by the center government's involvement in his education reforms, which included the closure of his school, Haji Sulong entered politics. He formed alliances with religious leaders to informally establish a syariah court. As an influential figure in Patani, many politicians sought his support to gain a strong mandate from the Jawi community. However, he demonstrated pragmatism by supporting his friend Jaroen, a Buddhist, over Phra Phiphit Pakdi, a Muslim. His loyalty towards his friend and his belief in integration were prioritized over his identity as a Jawi Muslim. Nonetheless, his preferred candidate was not elected, partly due to Phra Phiphit Pakdi's cryptic use of a Quranic verse to gain local support while simultaneously discrediting Haji Sulong. Sulong's initial foray into politics was unsuccessful, but his political involvement grew over time.

==== Seven-point declaration ====
As the leader of the Provincial Islamic Council of Patani (PICP), Haji Sulong drafted a seven-point declaration outlining key demands for autonomy in public administration in southern Thailand.

The seven points were:

1. That the four southern provinces be governed as a unit, with a Muslim governor.
2. That for the first seven years of the school curriculum, Malay be allowed as the language of instruction.
3. That all taxes collected in the four southern provinces be expended there.
4. That 85 percent of government officials be local Malays.
5. That Malay and Thai be used together as the languages of government.
6. That the provincial Islamic committees have authority over the practice of Islam.
7. That the Islamic judicial system be separated from the provincial court system.

Haji Sulong's objectives were to ensure that southern Thailand was governed by southern Thais and members of the Jawi community. He believed this would improve public administration by better addressing the needs of the region's residents.

=== Conflict with the government and Jawi community ===
The central government rejected Sulong's demands in the seven-point declaration, stating that the existing system was adequate for governing southern Thailand. His demands also implied a decentralization of power over southern Thailand to regional politicians. The Malay (Jawi) community also did not universally support Sulong's ideology, fearing his demands would disrupt the regional status quo and further isolate them from the central government structure. Consequently, Sulong did not receive broad support for his demands.

Following the failure of the seven-point declaration, Sulong's efforts to implement his reforms faced setbacks. He reportedly became uncompromising and urged southerners to boycott the 1948 elections. He subsequently aligned himself with the separatist movement led by Tengku Mahmud Muhyiddin, advocating for the independence of southern Thailand. This was perceived as an act of rebellion, and Haji Sulong became regarded as an enemy of the state in Thailand.

== Disappearance ==
Haji Sulong was arrested for inciting the Jawi community and advocating for an election boycott in the region during the 1948 elections. In the following years, he was pressured to cease his political involvement and required to report periodically to the authorities, ostensibly to ensure his compliance. This situation was viewed by some as an insult to the Jawi community and an abuse of authority by the central government in the region. Within his madrasah, separatist ideology reportedly gained traction among students, strengthening the movement for independence. It is unclear to what extent Haji Sulong remained involved with these growing sentiments.

On 13 August 1954, Haji Sulong and his eldest son, along with close associates, were instructed to report to the Songkhla Police Station. They were reportedly to be transferred for trial concerning his alleged involvement in the rebellion. He mysteriously disappeared on his way to court, and his disappearance remains unexplained up to this day.

=== Legacy ===
Until now, public discussion regarding Haji Sulong, his reform efforts, and his later stance on independence is sensitive, and the central government navigates his contributions to the history of the Muslim insurgency in southern Thailand cautiously. There is concern that accounts of Haji Sulong's disappearance could provoke sentiment and increase opposition to the central government's presence in southern Thailand. Today, Haji Sulong is often viewed as a figure who achieved a near-mythical status due to his reforms, and his demands for autonomy or independence remain relevant to ongoing discussions.

== See also ==
- List of people who disappeared mysteriously: 1910–1990
