= Runda Kumpulan Kecil =

Militant Islamic insurgent group

- Small Patrol Units
- Leader: Rorhing Ahsong
- Dates active: c. 2000 – present
- Active regions: Southern Thailand: Yala; Pattani; Narathiwat; Songkhla (southern part) (Note: Rebels affiliated with the Runda Kumpulan Kecil (RKK) under the leadership of Bukhoree Kamsoh was active especially in the 4 Songkhla southern districts, Chana, Thepha, Na Thawi, and Saba Yoi.)
- Ideology: Separatism; Islamism
- Size: 500
- Wars: the South Thailand insurgency

The Runda Kumpulan Kecil (lit. 'Small Patrol Units'; RKK) is a jihadism insurgent group operating in three southern border provinces of Thailand and some areas of Songkhla province.

The RKK has been one of the most brutal and active violent groups of the South Thailand insurgency in recent years.

== History ==
Areas where the group is active

The RKK was founded by young Salafi members of the Barisan Revolusi Nasional-Koordinasi (BRN-C) in 2000 that had received military training in Indonesia. Therefore, it is still considered by some analysts as an offshoot of the Pejuang Kemerdekaan Patani connected to the BRN-C, and not as an independent organisation.

The RKK is based on well-trained, ruthless and effective commando style groups, named 'small patrol units' (Runda Kumpulan Kecil) after the description of their month-long military training course. Estimates range of 500 members. Captured members have confessed to the Thai authorities that they routinely flee to Malaysia after carrying out violent attacks in the provinces of Yala, Pattani, Narathiwat, or Songkhla. Although several RKK members have been arrested or killed by the Thai military or police in the past decade, it is very difficult for those involved in counterinsurgency to penetrate the structure of the group owing to its secrecy and great mobility.

== Leadership ==
There is very little information about the leadership and structure of the RKK due to its very secretive and non-hierarchical nature. However, the group does place a lot of value on education (specifically religious education); in fact, their leader is referred to as an Ustaz (which means teacher).

=== Rorhing Ashong ===
The only known leader of the RKK is Rorhing Ahsong, also known as Ustaz Rorhing (aka "teacher" Rorhing).

=== Sapee-aree Jehkor ===
In July 2006, the Royal Thai Police (RTP) arrested two supposed members of the RKK, one of which was Sapee-aree Jekhor. He is thought to be a very important member of the group, however, the extent of his participation is still unknown.

=== Zulkifli Abdhir ===
Zulkifli Abdhir (also Zulfiki bin Hir, Marwan, etc.) was thought to have been associated with the RKK, although the link is still uncertain.

=== Bukhoree Kamsoh ===
Under Bukhoree Kamsoh the RKK group was mainly active in the southern part of Songkhla, in the 4 districts, namely Chana, Thepha, Na Thawi, and Saba Yoi. However, they also carried out attacks and bombings in other districts in Songkhla, such as in the urban districts of Mueang Songkhla and Hat Yai.

== Methods ==
=== Type of attack ===
The RKK predominately resorts to bombings as their main form of attack. From 2008 (the year of the first reported incident) to 2017, the group has conducted 171 attacks. Approximately 133 of these (78 per cent) were bombings. After this, armed assault is the second most used type of attack; however, only 28 of these (16 per cent) have been by this method. The remaining attacks are facility/infrastructure (11 attacks), hijacking (5 attempts), and assassinations (2 attempts).

=== Target ===
Civilians are most often the victims of attacks made by the RKK; however, businesses and the police are also major targets: 29 per cent of the reported attacks targeted civilians, 20 per cent targeted businesses, and 18 per cent targeted the police. The remaining attacks targeted the military (23 attacks), utilities (19 attacks), transportation (9 attacks), educational institutions (8 attacks), and government (7 attacks).

=== Casualties ===
Despite the large volume of attacks, the RKK's reported death rate is fairly low. Of the 171 reported incidents, 136 (80 per cent) had zero fatalities. 34 attacks resulted in at least one fatality but none of the attacks resulted in more than five fatalities. Twenty of the attacks resulted in one fatality each, five of the attacks resulted in two fatalities each, four of the attacks resulted in three fatalities each, four of the attacks resulted in four fatalities each, and one attack resulted in five fatalities.

As of 2017, 63 deaths and 403 injuries have been attributed to the RKK.

== Incidents ==
=== Bombing of police transport ===
On 25 July 2012 a police transport of the Royal Thai Police travelling through the Raman District (in the Yala Province) exploded from a roadside bomb. This left five officers dead and one wounded. Of the 171 incidents reported from 2008 to 2017, this was the RKK's most deadly incident.

=== Derailing of train in Narithiwat Province ===
On 18 November 2012 a train travelling through the City of Reuso (in the Narithiwat Province) derailed as a result of a bomb planted under the track. After the train derailed, a group of assailants began to shoot into the train cars. There were three confirmed deaths and approximately 36 injuries.

=== Muang Pattani department store explosions ===
On 9 May 2017 a bomb exploded in a Big-C department store in the City of Muang Pattani. The explosion injured approximately 40 people.

On 10 May 2017 a lorry filled with explosives detonated at the same Big-C department store. The explosion injured approximately 40 people, bringing the total from the two attacks to 80.

=== Muang restaurant explosion ===
On 25 August 2009 a car bomb exploded outside of a restaurant in downtown Muang. There were no reported fatalities, but there were approximately 43 injuries. Two supposed members of the RKK were arrested in connection with the explosion.

=== Danok hotel explosion ===
On 22 December 2013 a car filled with explosives exploded outside of the Oliver Hotel in Danok, Songkhla Province. Two were killed and 25 others were injured. The explosion was one of multiple bombings that occurred in the area that day.

The RKK group has been involved in numerous arson, bombing and murder attacks in the past decade. Seventeen suspects who were arrested by the Thai Police after the assassination of a Buddhist monk on 16 October 2005 claimed to have connexions with the RKK. The reports that followed the arrest stated that the insurgent group members had been trained at Muslim schools in Bandung, Indonesia. On 13 February 2013, an armed group of 60 men attacked a military base in the southern part of the country, 16 of whom were killed by the army. On 4 April 2017, 12 police officers were wounded in an attack in Yala. Security personnel attributed the attack to the RKK . On 22 August 2017, police arrested a man in his 30s who is a supposed member of the RKK. The Thai media stated that he was suspected of taking part in the attack on six lorries on 16 August 2017. A top member of the group called Sobueri Jehe was killed by security forces. Between c. 2000 and April 2018 the group lost some 39 members.

== See also ==
- Barisan Revolusi Nasional-Koordinasi (BRN-C)
- South Thailand insurgency
- Salafi jihadism
