= Wan Kadir Che Man =

Thai-Malay scholar and separatist politician (born 1946)

Wan Abdul Kadir Che Man (Thai: วันอับดุลกาเดร์ เจ๊ะมัน; RTGS: Wan-apdunkade Che-man; born 1946) is a Thai-Malay scholar and separatist politician. He was the president of Bersatu, a former umbrella group of separatists in south Thailand. He lives in exile in Malaysia.

During the 1990s, he was a lecturer in the department of history, University of Brunei Darussalam, and later an associate professor at the International Islamic University Malaysia.

== Selected works ==
- Muslim Elites and Politics in Southern Thailand. Universiti Sains Malaysia. 1983.
- Muslim Separatism: The Moros of Southern Philippines and the Malays of Southern Thailand. Oxford University Press. 1990.
- Che Man, W.K. (1990). "The Thai Government and Islamic Institutions in the Four Southern Muslim Provinces of Thailand". Sojourn. 5 (2) SJ5-2D: 255–282. doi:10.1355/SJ5-2D (inactive 1 July 2025).
- National Integration and Resistance Movement: The Case of Muslims in Southern Thailand In: Volker Grabowsky (ed.), Regions and National Integration in Thailand, 1892-1992 Harrassowitz Verlag. 1995, pp. 232-250.
