= Southern Thailand insurgency =

Religiously motivated armed conflict since 2004

- Part of Crime in Thailand, spillovers of the War on drugs and of the War against the Islamic State
- Map of the southern provinces of Thailand showing the Malay-Muslim majority areas
Date	4 January 2004 – present (22 years, 10 months and 2 days)
Location	Southern Thailand (Songkhla, Pattani, Yala and Narathiwat)
Status	Ongoing; Emergency Decree imposed for Pattani, Yala, Narathiwat as of July 2005

Belligerents
Thailand; Royal Thai Armed Forces; Army; 5th Div.; 9th Div.; 15th Div.; Thahan Phran; Navy; RTMC; PMR; Air Force; RTP; BPP; PARU; AMLO; DOPA; DSI; ISOC; NIA; ONCB; SBPA	BRN; RKK; GMIP; BIPP; PULO; GAM (until 2005); Mayaki cartel; Jemaah Islamiyah (until 2024); Islamic State; East Asia Province; Pattani mujahideen (since 2017)	Drug cartels; Mayaki cartel; Xaysana cartel; Usman cartel; Oil smugglers; Pirates

Commanders and leaders
(Thailand) Anutin Charnvirakul (since 2025) (Thailand) Paetongtarn Shinawatra (2024–2025) (Thailand) Srettha Thavisin (2023–2024) (Thailand) Prayut Chan-o-cha (2014–2023) (Thailand) Yingluck Shinawatra (2011–2014) (Thailand) Abhisit Vejjajiva (2008–2011) (Thailand) Surayud Chulanont (2006–2008) (Thailand) Thaksin Shinawatra (2004–2006)	Sapaeing Basoe; Masae Useng; Hassan Taib; Wan Kadir Che Man; Kabir Abdul Rahman; Sama-ae Thanam; Abdullah Sungkar †; Tengku Jalal Nasir; Nasoree Saesang; Sopepun Buenae †; Maroso Chantrawadee †	Mayaki Yako Xaysana Kaewpimpa (arrested) Usman Slamang (fugitive) Rafed Lumbok (fugitive); Sahachai Jiansermsin (high sea), etc.

Strength
60,000	10,000–15,000	unknown

Casualties and losses
2,342 state personnel killed 6,932 state personnel injured	Unspecified number killed overall 2004: ~300 Insurgents Killed; 700+ arrested; 2008-2011: 76 insurgents killed; 221 captured; 2020 - 2022: 55+ insurgents killed; 2026: 5+ insurgents killed	13,350 detained (2022-2023)
- 7,683+ killed (2004–present); 14,415+ injured (2004–present)

The Southern Thailand insurgency (Thai: ความไม่สงบในชายแดนภาคใต้ของประเทศไทย; Malay: Pemberontakan di Thailand Selatan) is an ongoing conflict centered in southern Thailand. It originated in 1948 as a separatist insurgency in the historical Malay Patani Region, made up of the three southernmost provinces of Thailand and parts of a fourth, but has become more complex and increasingly violent since the early 2000s from drug cartels, oil smuggling networks, and sometimes pirate raids.

The former Sultanate of Patani, which included the southern Thai provinces of Pattani (Patani), Yala (Jala), Narathiwat (Menara)—also known as the three Southern Border Provinces (SBP)—as well as neighbouring parts of Songkhla Province (Singgora), and the northeastern part of Malaysia (Kelantan), was conquered by the Kingdom of Siam in 1785 and, except for Kelantan, has been governed by Thailand ever since.

Although low-level separatist violence had occurred in the region for decades, the campaign escalated after 2001, with a recrudescence in 2004, and has occasionally spilled over into other provinces. Incidents blamed on southern insurgents have occurred in Bangkok and Phuket. In July 2005, Prime Minister Thaksin Shinawatra assumed wide-ranging emergency powers to deal with the southern violence, but the insurgency escalated further. On 19 September 2006, a military junta ousted Thaksin in a coup d'état. The junta implemented a major policy shift by replacing Thaksin's earlier approach with a campaign to win over the "hearts and minds" of the insurgents. Despite little progress in curbing the violence, the junta declared that security was improving and that peace would come to the region by 2008. By March 2008, however, the death toll surpassed 3,000. During the Democrat-led government of Abhisit Vejjajiva, Foreign Minister Kasit Piromya noted a "sense of optimism" and said that he was confident of bringing peace to the region in 2010. But by the end of 2010 insurgency-related violence had increased, confounding the government's optimism. Finally in March 2011, the government conceded that violence was increasing and could not be solved in a few months. Local leaders have persistently demanded at least a level of autonomy from Thailand for the Patani region and some of the separatist insurgent movements have made a series of prior demands before engaging in peace talks and negotiations. However, these groups have been largely sidelined by the Barisan Revolusi Nasional-Koordinasi (BRN-C), the group currently spearheading the insurgency. It sees no reason for negotiations and is against talks with other insurgent groups. The BRN-C has as its immediate aim to make southern Thailand ungovernable and it has largely been successful.

Estimates of the strength of the insurgency vary greatly. In 2004, General Pallop Pinmanee claimed that there were only 500 hardcore jihadists. Other estimates say there as many as 15,000 armed insurgents. Around 2004, some Thai analysts believed that foreign Islamic terrorist groups were infiltrating the area, and that foreign funds and arms were being brought in, though again, such claims were balanced by an equally large body of opinion suggesting this remains a distinctly local conflict. Over 6,500 people died and almost 12,000 were injured between 2004 and 2015 in a formerly ethnic separatist insurgency, which has currently been taken over by hard-line jihadists and pitted them against both the Thai-speaking Buddhist minority and local Muslims who have a moderate approach or who support the Thai government.

== Background of the insurgency ==
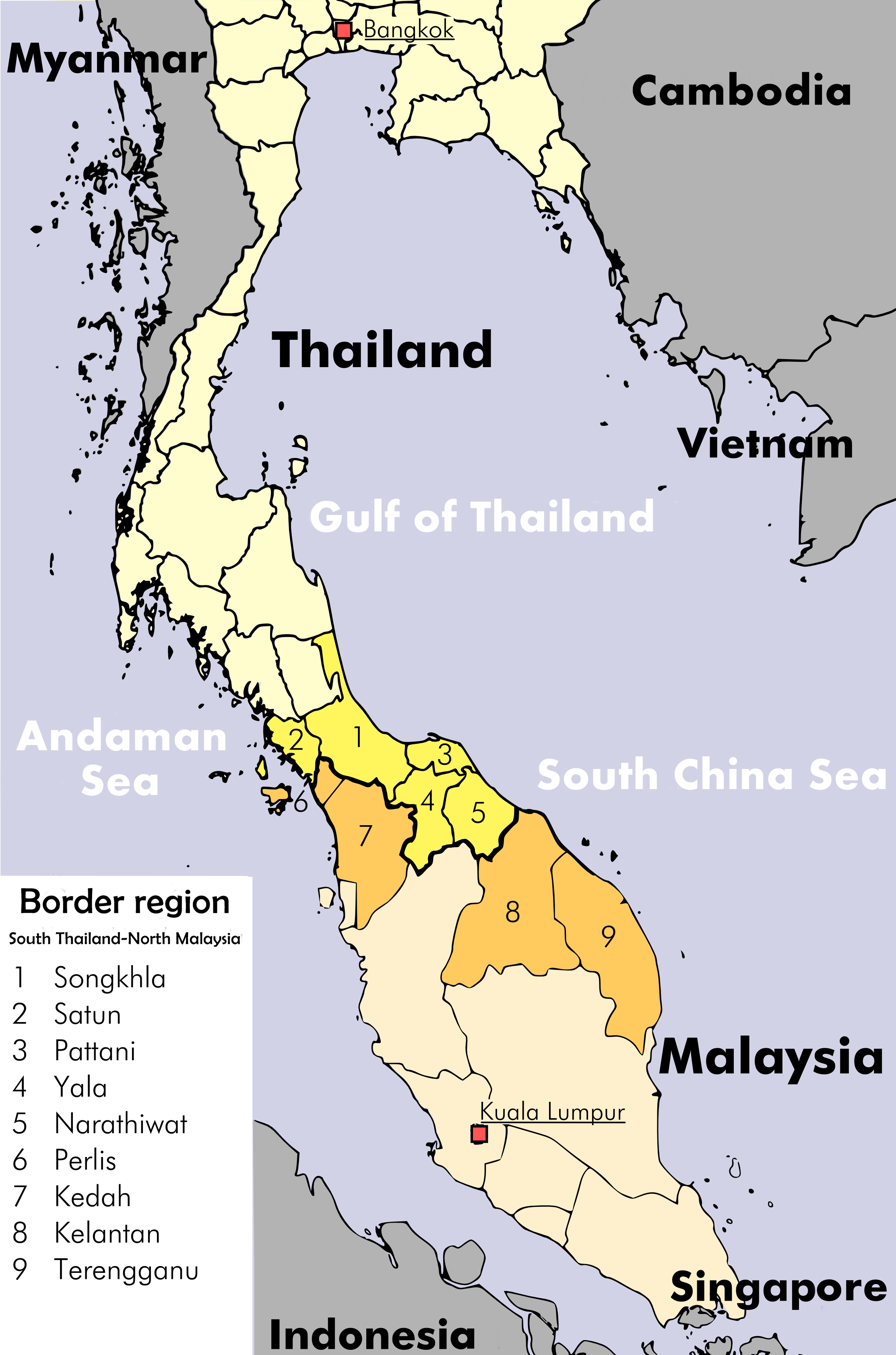
Malay Muslim provinces in Southern Thailand with northern Malaysia.

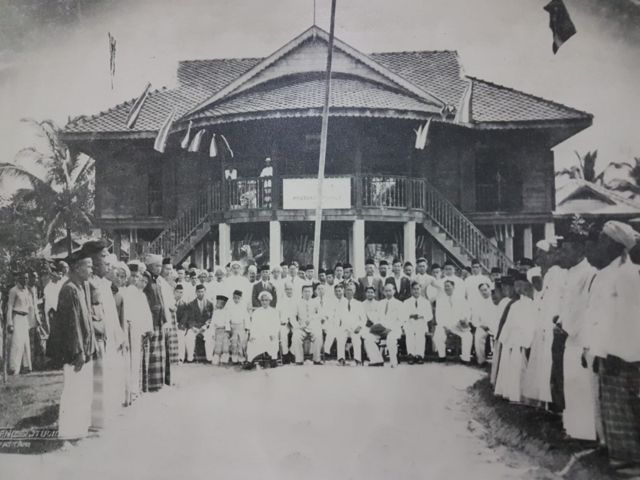
Haji Sulong and Pridi Banomyong in front of the school that Haji Sulong built from a donation from the people in 1945

=== Historical background ===
Despite the ethnic affinity of the people of the Patani region with their Malay neighbours to the south, the old Patani Kingdom was led by sultans who historically preferred to pay tribute to the distant Siamese kings in Bangkok. For many centuries the King of Siam restricted himself to exacting a periodic tribute in the form of Bunga mas, ritual trees with gold leaves and flowers that were a symbolic acknowledgment of Siamese suzerainty, leaving the Patani rulers largely alone.

=== Forced assimilation and local nationalism ===
Thai rule over the historical Patani region was confirmed by the Anglo-Siamese Treaty of 1909. Until well into the 20th century, the government in Bangkok had interfered little locally, relying on local officials for the implementation of policies within the Patani region. This included an exemption in implementing Thai Civil Law, which had allowed Muslims to continue their observance of local Islamic laws regarding issues on inheritance and family. However, by 1934 Marshal Plaek Phibunsongkhram set in motion of a process of Thaification which had as its objective the cultural assimilation of the Patani people, among other ethnic groups in Thailand.

The National Culture Act was enforced as a result of the Thaification process, promoting the concept of "Thai-ness" and its centralist aims. Its "Mandate 3" was directly aimed at the Patani people. By 1944, Thai civil law was enforced throughout the land including the Patani region, over-riding earlier concessions to local Islamic administrative practices. The school curriculum was revised to be Thai-centric, with all lessons in the Thai language, to the detriment of the local Jawi. Traditional Muslim courts that formerly handled civil cases were removed and replaced with civil courts run and approved by the central government in Bangkok. This forced assimilation process and the perceived imposition of Thai-Buddhist cultural practices upon their society were irritants to the ethnic Malay Patani.

In 1947, Haji Sulong, founder of the Patani People's Movement, launched a petition campaign, demanding autonomy, language, and cultural rights, and implementation of Islamic law. In January 1948, Sulong was arrested on treason charges along with other local leaders branded as "separatist". Shortly after Sulong's arrest, the Greater Patani Malay Association (Malay: Gabungan Melayu Patani Raya) was founded by Tengku Mahmood Mahyideen to advocate for his release. Sulong was released from jail in 1952, then disappeared under mysterious circumstances in 1954.

Denied recognition as a culturally separate ethnic minority, Patani leaders reacted against the Thai government policy towards them. Inspired by ideologies such as Nasserism, in the 1950s a Patani nationalist movement began to grow, leading to the south Thailand insurgency. By 1959, Tengku Jalal Nasir established the Patani National Liberation Front (BNPP), the first Malay rebel group. At the time of their foundation the goal of the nationalist movements, such as the Patani United Liberation Organisation (PULO) established in 1968, was secession. The emphasis was laid in pursuing an armed struggle towards an independent state where Patani people could live with dignity without having alien cultural values imposed on them.

The last third of the 20th century saw the emergence of different insurgent groups in the south. Despite some differences in ideology they shared broadly separatist aims, but all justified the use of violence to reach their goals, setting a pattern of attacking police and military posts, as well as schools and Thai government offices. The effectiveness of these groups was marred, however, by infighting and lack of unity among them.

=== 21st century: The violence expands and intensifies ===
A resurgence in violence by Pattani guerrilla groups began after 2001. While the region's traditional separatist insurgents had flags, and leaders, claimed responsibility for the attacks, and made communiques, the new groups attacked more viciously and kept silent. This new development disoriented and confused the Thai authorities, who kept groping in the dark as the identity of the new insurgents in the conflict remained a mystery. Thailand held relatively free elections in February 2005, but no secessionist candidates contested the results in the south. In July of the same year, the chairman of the Narathiwat Islamic Committee admitted, "The attacks look like they are well-organised, but we do not know what group of people is behind them." Despite the shroud of anonymity and the absence of concrete demands, revived groups, such as the GMIP, and particularly the BRN-Coordinate and its alleged armed wing, the Runda Kumpulan Kecil (RKK), have been identified as leading the new insurgency.

While earlier attacks were typified by drive-by shootings in which patrolling policemen were shot by gunmen on passing motorcycles, after 2001 they have escalated to well-coordinated attacks on police establishments, with police stations and outposts ambushed by well-armed groups subsequently fleeing with stolen arms and ammunition. Other tactics used to gain publicity from shock and horror are slashing to death Buddhist monks, bombing temples, beheadings, intimidating pork vendors and their customers, as well as arson attacks on schools, killing the teachers —mostly female— and burning their bodies. In rare cases, Pattani guerrilla groups had also threatened Thai Christians.

Current insurgent groups proclaim militant jihadism and are not separatist anymore. Mostly led by Salafist hardliners, they have extreme and transnational religious goals, such as an Islamic caliphate, to the detriment of a constructive cultural or nationalistic Patani identity. Salafi jihadist groups are hostile to the cultural heritage and practices of traditional Malay Muslims, accusing them of being unIslamic. They are not concerned about an independent separate nation. Instead, their immediate aim is to make the Patani region ungovernable.

The Thai response to the insurgency has been hampered by clumsy methods, a lack of training in counter-insurgency, a lack of understanding of local culture, and rivalries between the police and the army. Many local policemen are allegedly involved in the local drug trade and other criminal activities, and army commanders from Bangkok treat them with disdain. Often the army responds to the attacks with heavy-handed raids to search Muslim villages, which only results in reprisals. Insurgents routinely provoke the inexperienced Thai government into disproportionate responses, generating sympathy among the Muslim populace.

=== Main incidents after the 2001 insurgency upsurge ===
Attacks after 2001 concentrated on installations of the police and military. Schools and other symbols of Thai authority in the region have been subject to arson and bombing as well. Local police officers of all ranks and government officials were the primary targets of seemingly random assassinations, with 19 policemen killed and 50 incidents related to the insurgency in the three provinces of Pattani, Yala, and Narathiwat by the end of 2001. School teachers have been a prime target. The BRN-C, through its Pejuang Kemerdekaan Patani paramilitary wing, has been the main group behind the murder of 157 teachers in the Southern Border Provinces between 2004 and 2013.

In 2006, NBC wrote: "A massive security presence in the region has failed to stem almost daily violence, usually involving drive-by shootings or small bombings. When the insurgents make a show of strength—generally at least every few months—they have eschewed large-scale attacks, preferring well-coordinated pinprick assaults at many locations while avoiding direct clashes with security forces."

Two bombs were detonated consecutively at the Big C shopping mall in Mueang Pattani District on 9 May 2017 at peak hour. 56 people were wounded, including young children. Also at the same year, a group called "Pattani mujahideen" officially pledged allegiance to the Islamic State.

In 2022, Islamic State officially marked their first full presence in Southern Thailand, marking a dangerous upgrade from localised into now a globalised jihadist movement, with media outlet called Al-Nibras News propagating IS propaganda. In 2025, IS-inspired militants launched a major attack on a police convoy, killing one police officer.

== Reactions and explanations ==
=== Official reactions ===
The government at first blamed the attacks on "bandits", and many outside observers believe that local clan, commercial or criminal rivalries played a role in the violence.

In 2002, Thaksin stated, "There's no separatism, no ideological terrorists, just common bandits." By 2004, however, he had reversed his position and had come to regard the insurgency as a local front in the global war on terrorism. Martial law was instituted in Pattani, Yala, and Narathiwat in January 2004.

Since the 2006 military coup, the Thai government has taken a more conciliatory approach to the insurgency, avoiding the excessive use of force that typified Thaksin's time in office, and opened negotiations with known separatist groups. Violence, however, has escalated. This likely backs the assertion that there are several groups involved in the violence, few of whom have been placated by the government's change of strategy.

On 3 June 2011, Army Chief Prayut Chan-o-cha stated that the insurgency is orchestrated from abroad and funded via drug and oil smuggling.

=== Islam ===
Although Thailand's southern violence is mostly ethnic-based, anonymous leaflets issued by militant groups often contain jihadist language. Many young militants received training and indoctrination from Islamic teachers, some of which took place within Islamic educational institutions. Many see the southern Thai violence as a form of Islamist militancy and Islamic separatism, testifying to the strength of Malay Muslim beliefs and the determination of local people to resist the (Buddhist) Thai state on religious grounds.

Recently, a religious factor has been brought to discussion due to the rise of the Islamist movement, especially the Salafi movement, which aimed to liberate the Muslim-dominated Malay regions from Thailand. Since 2022, groups with links to the Islamic State have also begun to operate in the area, and they have demonstrated support for various jihadist attacks, unveiling a newly accelerating trend of the local insurgency being increasingly turning transnational jihadism.

=== Political factors ===
Thai authorities claim that the insurgency is not caused by a lack of political representation of the Muslim population. By the late 1990s, Muslims were holding unprecedented senior posts in Thai politics. For example, Wan Muhamad Noor Matha, a Malay Muslim from Yala, served as chairman of parliament from 1996 to 2001 under the Democrats and later as interior minister during the first Thaksin government. Thaksin's first government (2001–2005) also saw 14 Muslim members of parliament (MPs) and several Muslim senators. Muslims dominated provincial legislative assemblies in the border provinces, and several southern municipalities had Muslim mayors. Muslims were able to voice their political grievances openly and enjoy a much greater degree of religious freedom.

The Thaksin regime, however, began to dismantle the southern administration organisation, replacing it with a notoriously corrupt police force that immediately began widespread crackdowns. Consultation with local community leaders was also abolished. Discontent over the abuses led to growing violence during 2004 and 2005. Muslim politicians and leaders remained silent out of fear of repression, thus eroding their political legitimacy and support. This cost them dearly. In the 2005 general election, all but one of the eleven incumbent Muslim MPs who stood for election were voted out of office.

=== Economic factors ===
Poverty and economic problems are a key factor behind the insurgency.

Although Thailand's economy has grown dramatically in the past several decades, gains in both northern and southern provinces have been relatively limited. Income differences between Buddhist and Muslim households are especially pronounced in the border region.

The percentage of people living below the poverty line also fell, from 40%, 36%, and 33% in 2000 to 18%, 10%, and 23% in 2004 for Pattani, Narathiwat, and Yala, respectively. By 2004, the three provinces had 310,000 people living below the poverty line, compared to 610,000 in 2000. However, 45% of all poor southerners lived in the three border provinces.

Muslims in the border provinces generally have lower levels of educational attainment compared to their Buddhist neighbours. 69.80% of the Muslim population in the border provinces have only a primary school education, compared to 49.6% of Buddhists in the same provinces. Only 9.20% of Muslims have completed secondary education (including those who graduated from private Islamic schools), compared to 13.20% of Buddhists. Just 1.70% of the Muslim population have a bachelor's degree, while 9.70% of Buddhists hold undergraduate degrees. Government schools generally enforce a Thai language curriculum to the exclusion of the region's Patani-Malay languages, a policy which produces low literacy rates and contributes to the view of government schools as antagonistic to Malay culture. The secular educational system is being undermined by the destruction of schools and the murders of teachers by the insurgent groups.

The lesser educated Muslims also have reduced employment opportunities compared to their Buddhist neighbours. Only 2.4% of all working Muslims in the provinces held government posts, compared with 19.2% of all working Buddhists. Jobs in the Thai public sector are difficult to obtain for those Muslims who never fully accepted the Thai language or the Thai education system. Insurgent attacks on economic targets further reduce employment opportunities for both Muslims and Buddhists in the provinces.

== Leading insurgent groups ==
Currently the most active insurgent movements are the BRN-Coordinate, its alleged armed wing the Runda Kumpulan Kecil (RKK), and the GMIP. PULO, the doyen of the Patani insurgent groups and formerly the most respected secessionist movement in the region, has been largely inactive in recent years. Recently, an inspired Islamic State branch has also started to emerge in Southern Thailand.

=== BRN-C ===
The Barisan Revolusi Nasional-Koordinasi (BRN-C) is currently the most important group, spearheading the insurgency in southern Thailand. It was revived after 2001 and its leaders are mainly Salafi religious teachers who have rejected the Pan-Arab socialist ideology of the early BRN, engaging in political activism by recruiting followers in mosques and indoctrinating at Islamic schools. This group has the vision of becoming a mass movement, aiming towards having 400,000 members in its area of operation. The BRN-C has no constructive cultural or nationalistic goals; instead its immediate aim is to make southern Thailand ungovernable. It has been largely successful at spreading and maintaining an atmosphere of terror and uncertainty through well-trained secret militant units that engage in assassinations, bombing, calculated destruction, and guerrilla warfare.

=== RKK ===
The Runda Kumpulan Kecil (RKK), allegedly one of the armed wings of the BRN-C, has been one of the most brutal and ruthless groups of the South Thailand insurgency in recent years. It is composed of young, mostly Salafi, militants who routinely flee to Malaysia after carrying out violent attacks, including arson, bombings, capture or kill educational personnel who may pose a threat to the spread of the group's ideas, guerrilla warfare, murders in Yala, Pattani, or Narathiwat Province, and raiding and rob weapons or attack military and police operation bases. Although several RKK members have been arrested or killed by the Thai military or police in the past decade, it is difficult for those involved in counterinsurgency to penetrate the structure of the group owing to its secrecy and mobility.

=== GMIP ===
Like the BRN-C, the Gerakan Mujahidin Islam Patani (GMIP) is a group that experienced a revival after 2001 and has currently more hard-line Islamic political goals, to the detriment of its former nationalist cause. Its members are now believed to have sympathies with Al Qaeda and with the establishment of the transnational Islamic Caliphate.

=== BBMP ===
The Barisan Bersatu Mujahidin Patani (BBMP) was created in 1985 as a radical breakaway of the National Front for the Liberation of Pattani (BNPP), distinguished from the latter by its overt Islamist ideology.

=== PULO ===
The Patani United Liberation Organisation (PULO) is a movement that was founded on the nationalist and secular values of Patani nation-building. Its priority was freeing Pattani from Thai rule by all means, including armed struggle.

However, since 2001 the civil society in the three southern Thai provinces has experienced a widespread imposition of legalistic Salafi norms and the reality on the ground is today very different from what it was in former southern Thailand. Salafism has heavily eroded Patani cultural identity and current insurgent groups have extreme religious goals, such as an Islamic Caliphate, to the detriment of Patani nationalism. Although some of the present-day insurgents are very likely former PULO members, it is still unclear whether they fight for PULO's cause and it is likely that many may have become part of the more active and religious organisations that have overtaken PULO. In recent years PULO's leadership has largely lost control over its insurgents and has a very limited overall degree of influence over the insurgency in southern Thailand.

On 26 July 2009 Abu Yasir Fikri, President of PULO, and the "emir" of the Group of Mujahidin Islam Patani (GMIP), Me Kuteh, agreed to join forces. Abu Yasir Fikri was allowed to speak on behalf of the GMIP on all political issues. The agreement included a section in which they agreed to form a unified military force, the Patani Liberation Army (PLA). The PLA would be commanded by the First Deputy Military Commander of the Patani United Liberation Organisation (PULO).

On 18 April 2009, PULO outlined a solution to conflict at the OICs Twelfth Meeting of the Intergovernmental Group of Experts to consider the Conditions of Muslim Communities and Minorities in Jeddah.

=== ISIS ===
The Islamic State (IS) is a newcomer to South Thailand insurgency, though first hint of its emergence has begun since 2018. Unlike other militant groups, IS carries explicit messages based on Salafi jihadism, calling for the region to secede from South Thailand and to establish it as a province of the group's global outreach. A media outlet called Al-Nibras News propagating IS propaganda. In 2025, IS-inspired militants launched a major attack on a police convoy, killing one police officer. The group is also appeared to be gaining strength, due to the eroding power of PULO and disunity of other insurgent groups over which path should be taken, although to which length it can undermine the state is unknown.

=== Symbols ===
In the last decade of the unrest in south Thailand, the Black Standard flag has largely replaced the colourful secessionist flags formerly used by the different groups involved in the insurgency against the Thai government.

Original flag of the PULO, still used today by original PULO faction headed by Abu Yasir Fikri

Flag of Gabungan Melayu Patani Raya (GEMPAR)

Flag of Negara Patani Raya (State of Greater Patani)

Flag of the Barisan Revolusi Nasional Melayu Patani (BRN)

Flag of the BRN-Koordinasi (BRN-C)

Flag of the BRN-Ulama

Flag used by "Dagger PULO" (1989–2005)

Flag of the united (five-star) PULO (2005–present)

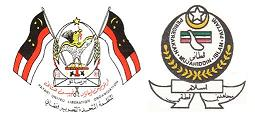
Original arms of the PULO and GMIP

Al-raya flag of Jihad

Islamic State (IS) flag

== High profile incidents ==
=== Krue Se Mosque incident ===
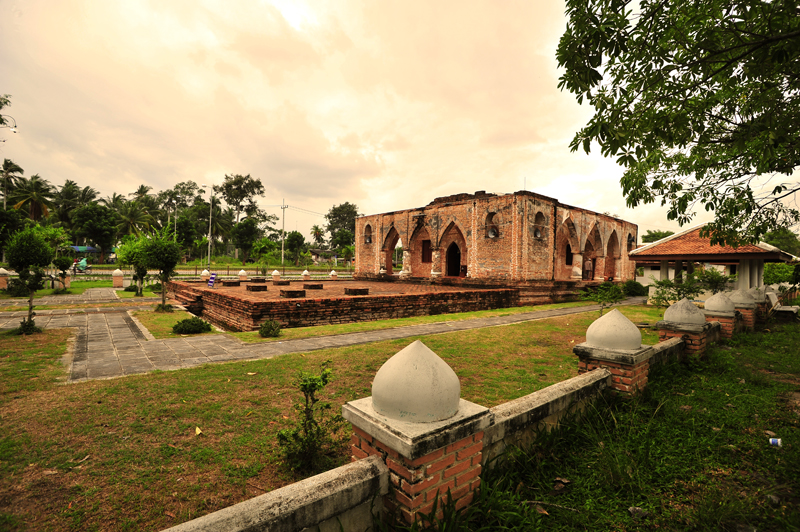
Krue Se Mosque

On 28 April 2004, more than 100 militants carried out terrorist attacks against 10 police outposts across Pattani, Yala, and Songkhla Provinces in south Thailand. Thirty-two gunmen retreated to the 16th-century Krue Se Mosque, regarded by Muslims as the holiest mosque in Pattani.

General Pallop Pinmanee, commander of the "Southern Peace Enhancement Center" and deputy director of the Internal Security Operations Command, was the senior army officer on the scene. After a tense seven-hour stand-off, Pallop ordered an all-out assault on the mosque. All of the gunmen were killed. He later insisted, "I had no choice. I was afraid that as time passed the crowd would be sympathetic to the insurgents, to the point of trying to rescue them".

It was later revealed that Pallop's order to storm the mosque contravened a direct order by Defense Minister Chavalit Yongchaiyudh to seek a peaceful resolution to the stand-off no matter how long it took. Pallop was immediately ordered out of the area, and later tendered his resignation as commander of the Southern Peace Enhancement Center. The forward command of the Internal Security Operations Command (ISOC), which Pallop headed, was also dissolved. A government investigative commission found that the security forces had over-reacted. The Asian Centre for Human Rights questioned the independence and impartiality of the investigative commission. On 3 May 2004 during a senate hearing, Senator Kraisak Choonhavan noted that most of those killed at Krue Se Mosque had been shot in the head and there were signs that ropes had been tied around their wrists, suggesting they had been executed after being captured.

The incident resulted in a personal conflict between Pallop and Defense Minister Chavalit, who was also director of the ISOC. Pallop later demanded that the defence minister cease any involvement in the management of the southern insurgency.

=== Tak Bai incident ===
In October 2004, the town of Tak Bai in Narathiwat Province saw the most publicised incident of the insurgency. Six local men were arrested for having supplied weapons to insurgents. A demonstration was organised to demand their release and the police called in army reinforcements. The army used tear gas and water cannons on the crowd, and shooting started in which seven men were killed.

Hundreds of local people, mostly young men, were arrested. They were made to take off their shirts and lie on the ground. Their hands were tied behind their backs. Later that afternoon, they were thrown by soldiers into trucks to be taken to the Ingkayutthaboriharn army camp in the nearby province of Pattani. The prisoners were stacked five or six deep in the trucks, and by the time the trucks reached their destination five hours later, in the heat of the day, 78 men had died of suffocation.

This incident sparked widespread protests across the south, and across Thailand, as even non-Muslim Thais were appalled at the army's behaviour. Thaksin, however, gave the army his full support. Those responsible for the ill-treatment and death of the detainees received the most minor of non-custodial punishments. Thaksin's initial response was to defend the army's actions, saying that the 78 men died "because they were already weak from fasting during the month of Ramadan".

Charges were filed against 58 suspects accused of participating in the demonstration. However, the case was dropped in November 2006 as it would not be good for the public and "might affect national security".

On 2 November 2006, then Prime Minister Surayud Chulanont gave a formal apology for the incident. This caused a large rise in violent incidents the next day.

=== 2009 Thailand standoff ===
This standoff between insurgents and Thai police and military took place in Yala, Thailand on 27 June 2009 at 7:55 am local time. A combined force of 200 district police officers and soldiers of Taskforce 15 sealed off a house in the Bannang Sata district of Yala province after locals tipped them of the presence of separatist militants.

As police and the army stormed the building, militants holed up inside opened fire, killing Sgt Maj Pongsathorn Niraphai of the Bannang Sata police station and Sergeant Major 3rd Class Sangsun Kalong, 39, a soldier. A suspected militant, Sopepun Buenae, 26 was killed when he tried to escape. At least two rebels managed to escape despite being cornered for nearly 5 hours.

During the preceding weeks, attacks by separatists had increased; 41 people were killed and 60 wounded in June alone. Earlier in June, masked gunmen killed 11 worshippers in a mosque in the Narathiwat province. The incident, which also wounded 12 people was considered as one of the worst attacks in 5 years. A $5,900 reward for leads on the attack was announced.

== Reconciliation and negotiation ==
=== Negotiation attempts ===
Attempts to negotiate with insurgents were hampered by the anonymity of the insurgency's leaders.

In May 2004, Wan Kadir Che Man, exiled leader of Bersatu and for years one of the key symbolic figures in the guerrilla movement, stated that he would be willing to negotiate with the government to end the southern violence. He also hinted that Bersatu would be willing to soften its previous demands for an independent state.

The government initially welcomed the request to negotiate. However, the government response was severely criticised as being "knee-jerk" and "just looking to score cheap political points." But when it became apparent that, despite his softened demand for limited autonomy, Wan Kadir Che Man had no influence over the violence, the negotiations were cancelled. The government then began a policy of not attempting to officially negotiate with the insurgents.

After being appointed army commander in 2005, General Sonthi Boonyaratglin expressed confidence that he could resolve the insurgency. He claimed that he would take a "new and effective" approach to a crisis and that "The Army is informed [of who the insurgents are] and will carry out their duties."

On 1 September 2006, a day after 22 commercial banks were simultaneously bombed in Yala Province, Sonthi announced that he would break with the government's no-negotiation policy. However, he noted that "We still don't know who is the real head of the militants we are fighting with." In a press conference the next day, he attacked the government for criticising him for trying to negotiate with the anonymous insurgents, and demanded that the government "Free the military and let it do the job." His confrontation with the government made his call for negotiation extremely popular with the media. Afterwards, insurgents bombed six department stores in Hat Yai city, which until then had been free of insurgent activities. The identity of the insurgents was not revealed. Sonthi was granted an extraordinary increase in executive powers to combat unrest in the far south. By 19 September 2006 (after Sonthi overthrew the Thai government), the army admitted that it was still unsure whom to negotiate with.

=== National Reconciliation Commission ===
In March 2005, respected former Prime Minister Anand Panyarachun was appointed chairman of a National Reconciliation Commission, tasked with overseeing the restoration of peace to the south. A fierce critic of the Thaksin-government, Anand frequently criticised the handling of southern unrest, and in particular the State of Emergency Decree. He has been quoted to have said, "The authorities have worked inefficiently. They have arrested innocent people instead of the real culprits, leading to mistrust among locals. So, giving them broader power may lead to increased violence and eventually a real crisis".

Anand submitted the NRC's recommendations on 5 June 2006. Among them were

- Introducing Islamic law (Sharia)
- Making ethnic Pattani-Malay (Yawi) a working language in the region
- Establishing an unarmed peacekeeping force
- Establishing a Peaceful Strategic Administrative Centre for Southern Border Provinces

The Thaksin government vowed to implement the recommendations. However, the recommendations were vigorously opposed by Prem Tinsulanonda, the president of King Bhumibol Adulyadej's Privy Council, who stated "We cannot accept that [proposal] as we are Thai. The country is Thai and the language is Thai... We have to be proud to be Thai and have the Thai language as the sole national language".

=== 2021–2022 talk ===
In mid 2021, the BRN sent a document to the government include three demands, a political solution that suits Thai Malays in the deep south, a decrease in military controls, and an inclusivity. The three demands marked a baseline of talk in Kuala Lumpur between Wanlop Rugsanaoh, chief negotiator from the government, and Anas Abdulrahman, the BRN representative.

== Casualties ==
Note: Table is not comprehensive

According to government data, from 2004 until the end of 2012 the conflict had resulted in at least 3,380 deaths, including 2,316 civilians, 372 troops, 278 police, 250 suspected insurgents, 157 education officials, and seven Buddhist monks. According to one report in the Patani Post in late May 2014, about 6,000 people have been killed in the conflict during the previous decade. A January 2016 article in the Bangkok Post reported a total of 6,543 deaths and 11,919 injuries from 2004 until the end of 2015, with an estimated 15,374 "insurgency-related" incidents occurring during the same period. From 2016 to November 2017, 160 more people have died. Though the insurgency is geared against the government, Thai security forces, and Buddhist civilians, in the general period of the conflict 60% of casualties have been Muslim – most of whom were killed at the hands of insurgents. On 13 January 2025, seven people were injured after a bomb attached to a motorcycle exploded near a police station in Mueang Pattani District.And On July 22 2026, five paramilitary rangers were killed and two civilians were injured when a group of heavily armed on a pickup truck attacked at the Bukeh Sami (municipal checkpoint in Tan Yong Mas subdistrict, Ra-ngae district, Narathiwat Province.

Year	Killed (minimum)
2004	625
2005	550
2006	780
2007	770
2008	450
2009	310
2010	521
2011	535
2012	326
2013	322
2014	341
2015	246
2016	116
2017	50
2018	61
2019	60
2020	47
2021	41
2022	36
2023	31
2024	49
2025	51
2026	7

== Human rights issues ==
Human Rights Watch (HRW) cites abuses on both sides. Numerous times the insurgents have murdered Buddhist monks collecting alms, and Buddhist villagers have been killed going about routine work such as rubber tapping, even though Buddhists have lived in the region for centuries. School teachers, headmasters, and students have been killed and schools torched presumably because schools represent a symbol of the Thai government. Civil servants, regardless of religion, have been targeted for assassination. According to the Thai Journalists Association, during the year 2008 alone there were over 500 attacks, resulting in more than 300 deaths in the four provinces where the insurgents operate.

Meanwhile, local Muslims have been beaten, killed, or simply "disappeared" during police questioning and custody. Human Rights Watch has documented at least 20 such disappearances. Soldiers and police have sometimes been indiscriminate when pursuing suspected insurgents, resulting in civilian collateral damage.

Of the 2,463 people killed in attacks from 2004 to 2007, almost 90% were civilians. Buddhist Thais and ethnic Malay Muslims were killed in bomb attacks, shootings, assassinations, ambushes, and machete attacks. At least 29 victims have been beheaded and mutilated. "There have been hundreds of militant attacks on teachers, schools, public health workers, hospital staff, and community health centers. For the first time in the region's history of separatist insurgencies, Buddhist monks and novices are now among those killed and injured by separatist militants," HRW said in a 2007 report.

"Village-based militants called Pejuang Kemerdekaan Patani (Patani Freedom Fighters) in the loose network of BRN-Coordinate (National Revolution Front-Coordinate) have now emerged as the backbone of the new generation of separatist militants. "Increasingly, they claim that the southern border provinces are not the land of Buddhist Thais, but a religious 'conflict zone' which must be divided between ethnic Malay Muslims and 'infidels'. The separatists seek to forcibly liberate Patani Darulsalam (Islamic Land of Patani), from what they call a Buddhist Thai occupation", HRW continued.

The 2010 World Report from Human Rights Watch highlighted escalating human rights abuses throughout Thailand, with the south reflecting overall policies against individual human rights. Sharply increased powers for police and the military were accompanied by a perceived lack of accountability.

=== Government harassment of suspected insurgents ===
The Asian Human Rights Commission accused the military of beating and torturing suspected insurgents by burning their genitals with cigarettes, smashing beer bottles over their knees, and chaining them to dogs. Such abuses were alleged to have occurred in October 2006, after the military seized power.

In December 2006, a group of 20 Muslims, nine men and 11 women aged between two and 55, sought political asylum in Malaysia. They claimed that the post-coup regime was more aggressive against civilians and that they were continuously harassed by the army.

A group of Muslims from Narathiwat who fled to Malaysia in March 2007 claimed that they were escaping intimidation and brutality by the military. The group complained that they were beaten and that their sons have been missing or detained since 2005. It also claimed that some youths died after they were poisoned during detention.

In late January 2012, an unknown number of insurgents ambushed a thahan pran base before retreating. Rangers chased the insurgents and were fired upon from a pick-up truck. The rangers fired back in self-defence resulting in four dead civilians in the truck with others wounded. The rangers found AK-47 assault rifles, but also claimed that the four dead civilians were not affiliated with insurgents in any way. Soldiers from the 4th army regiment are investigating. This killing has angered many Thai Muslims as the four dead persons were mosque leaders (an imam, a moulana, a khatib, and a bilai).

In early February, the Ministry of Interior proposed a 7.5 million baht compensation payment to all victims of the insurgency including those from the Tak Bai Massacre and the Kru Se Mosque Incident.

=== Justice ===
The Suicide of Khanakorn Pianchana sparked widespread public criticism of the justice system in Thailand’s deep south. Khanakorn, a Thai judge, attempted suicide in October 2019 and died following a second attempt in 2020, in protest against interference from senior judicial authorities. At the time of his first attempt, he was serving as a senior judge at the Yala Provincial Court in south Thailand. His actions called attention to the need for reform in the justice system, particularly in Muslim communities. Judge Khanakorn told the accused—five Muslims—and their families that he wished to acquit them due to insufficient evidence, but was being pressured by higher authorities to convict.

=== Emergency decree ===
The Emergency Decree was extended for the 68th time in 2022, since its first issue in July 2005. Academics, legal experts and rights activists called on the government to lift the law, amid human rights abuses and illegal activities by the government official.
