= Patani United Liberation Organisation =

Separatist insurgent group in Thailand

- Pertubuhan Pembebasan Bersatu Patani (Malay) องค์กรปลดปล่อยปัตตานีแห่งสหพันธรัฐ (Thai)
- Leaders: Kabir Abdul Rahman; Dr. Arong Muleng; Haji Hadi Bin Ghazali
- Dates active: 1968 – present
- Active regions: Southern Thailand
- Ideology: Separatism; Islamism
- Wars: the South Thailand insurgency

The Patani United Liberation Organisation (Malay: Pertubuhan Pembebasan Bersatu Patani, Thai: องค์กรปลดปล่อยปัตตานีแห่งสหพันธรัฐ, abbreviated PULO) is a separatist insurgent group in Thailand, calling for an independent Patani. It was founded in 1968 in Saudi Arabia. This organization composed the national anthem of Patani called Lagu Kebangsaan Patani.

The PULO, along with others, is currently fighting for the independence of Thailand's predominantly Malay Muslim south.

PULO's platform is highlighted by its Islamic nationalist goals, calling the Thai presence in Pattani "a colonisation" and an "illegal occupation." Its stated aims are to secede from Thailand through military and political means, and to create a state named Patani Darul Makrif (Pattani, Land of Good deeds). The PULO flag has four red and white stripes and a blue rectangle on the upper left with a crescent and a star similar to other Malaysian Malay states

== History ==
PULO was founded in 1968 reportedly around the leadership of Kabir Abdul Rahman (Bira Kotanila), a Patani Malay scholar, who served as its chairman until his death in 2008. By late 1992, the organisation had split into three factions. The first faction was headed by Dr. Arong Muleng while the second one was led by Haji Hadi Bin Ghazali. The first faction set up the PULO Leadership Council with a symbol of a dagger crossing with a sword as its logo. The name of its armed unit is called "Kasdan Army." The second faction, also headed by Haji Sama-ae Thanam, has set up the PULO Army Command Council to give support to Kabir Abdul Rahman, the founder of PULO. A third faction that is working according to the original charter of PULO has the largest ground support and is the only group with the diplomatic credibility, political influence and popular support to be able to officially negotiate and represent PULO at the OIC. They use four stars on their flag and is led by Abu Yasir Fikri a long time respected leader of PULO since its inception.

In 1995, rifts emerged among the core leaders of the new PULO movement. As a result, Dr. Arong Muleng decided to split his group from the movement to set up a new organisation called "PULO 88", while the other group led by Haji Abdul Rahman named its armed unit as "Pulo Keris" (Dagger Pulo).

== Current separatist actions ==
Currently, PULO has a policy of targeting those it views as collaborators and associates of the Thai government, such as teachers, civil servants, soldiers and policemen.

The organisation carries out car bombs, road side bombs and drive-by shootings targeting Thai military and police, whom they see as legitimate targets, but also has struck at civilian targets as well.

PULO considers itself to be continuing the independence struggle of the northernmost Malay sultanate after it declared its independence following the fall of Ayutthaya in 1767, though in fact it was reconquered by the Thais just 18 years later. The Islamic state proposed by PULO would cover the areas they claim were historically ruled by the Sultanate of Pattani, which it says consist of Pattani, Narathiwat, Yala, Songkhla and Satun provinces in present-day Thailand.

== Four star PULO ==
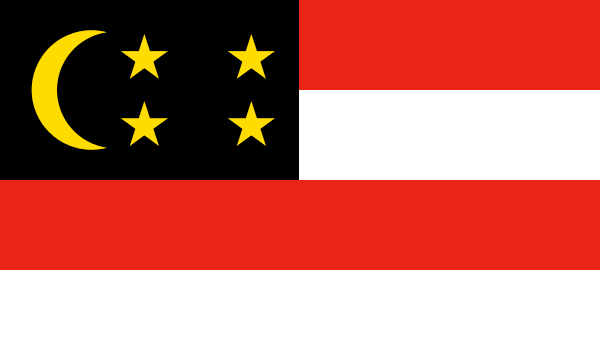
The flag of the original PULO

Four star PULO claims to be the most respected and popular separatist group in Patani with the most political influence and a large presence in the area, although little is known about the group as they prefer to stay out of media and work under a policy of silence. During recent years, the group has become increasingly visible and been able to show their influence by gathering active separatists and organising them under their political wing, as well as being recognised internationally as representatives of the Patani People.

They are currently the political representatives by popular consent of GMIP and military fractions of BRN, RKK and other separatist groups.

On 26 July 2009, the president of PULO and the Emir of the Movement of Mujahidin Islam Patani (GMIP), Cikgume Kuteh, made an official agreement to join forces. The agreement included giving a mandate to president of PULO to speak on behalf of the GMIP on all political issues. The agreement also included a section in which the movements agreed to unite in one military force, the Patani Liberation Army, to be led by the First Deputy Military Commander of the Patani United Liberation Organisation (PULO).

Pulo's flag used by "Dagger PULO" (1989–2005)

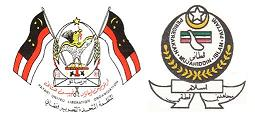
Logos of Original PULO and GMIP

== Five Star PULO ==
The five-star PULO flag (2005–present), of the defunct PULO faction where Kasturi is the self-appointed spokesperson who lives in Gothenburg.

The Five star PULO is differentiated from Four star PULO on the basis of their flag, which contains five stars. This fraction is mostly represented in the media by Kasturi. The group is supported and economically backed and created by the Thai government to gain control over separatist movements and pacify them. The Thai government has used the groups to create legitimacy around its initiated projects such as TASKFORCE. They are a newly established group formed 2005 and is mostly known by their frequent presence in Thai media often confused with four star PULO as they share the same name. They have however been backed by the centre for humanitarian dialogue – Switzerland based NGO as well as the Thai military which has kept it active.
