= Barisan Revolusi Nasional =

Malay Muslim insurgent movement in southern Thailand

Patani Malayu National Revolutionary Front Barisan Revolusi Nasional Melayu Patani ขบวนการแนวร่วมปฏิวัติแห่งชาติมลายูปัตตานี
- Flag of the Patani Malayu National Revolutionary Front (Note: Currently the use of the black flag of Jihad by BRN-C affiliated groups has largely replaced the former BRN flag.)
- Founder: Haji Abdul Karim Hassan
- Leaders: Hassan Taib, Masae Useng, Sapaeng Basoe, Abdullah Munir, Dulloh Waeman (Ustadz Loh), Abroseh Parehruepoh, Abdulkanin Kalupang, Isma-ae Toyalong, Arduenan Mama, Bororting Binbuerheng and Yusuf Rayalong (Ustadz Ismae-ae), among others.
- Spokesperson: Abdul Karim Khalid
- Founded: 13 March 1963
- Active regions: Greater Pattani, Thailand
- Ideology: Islamic socialism (formerly); Pattani separatism Islamic nationalism Malay nationalism Patani Malay ethnonationalism

Main area of operation of the BRN.

The Barisan Revolusi Nasional Melayu Patani ("Patani Malays National Revolutionary Front"), also known by the shorter form Barisan Revolusi Nasional (BRN; "National Revolutionary Front"), is an Islamist Patani independence movement in northern Malaysia (Perak, Perlis, Kedah and Kelantan) and Patani, southern Thailand. As of 2017, it is the most powerful rebel organization of the country.

Originally the BRN was established as a roughly territorial organisation, prioritizing Pattani secessionism. Since 2001, however, the BRN-C (BRN-Coordinasi) has become its most active wing, leading the south Thailand insurgency and imposing extreme religious values on the local society.

Another BRN flag

== Origin and groups ==
The BRN was founded on 13 March 1963 by Haji Abdul Karim Hassan. By 1984, three main factions were discernible within the group:

- The BRN-Coordinate or BRN-C (BRN-Koordinasi) is currently the largest, most active and best organised of the BRN subgroups. Rejecting the Pan-Arab socialist thought that influenced the early BRN, it favours Salafist ideology and is involved in political activism in the mosques and indoctrination at Islamic schools. The main recruiting unit of the BRN-C is the Pemuda (youth) student group and its leaders are mainly Islamic religious teachers, including veterans of the Soviet–Afghan War.

The BRN-Koordinasi is acknowledged as the group currently spearheading the insurgency in southern Thailand and is the origin of the group known as Runda Kumpulan Kecil (RKK) to which most violent attacks have been attributed in the last decade.

The BRN-C It has as its immediate aim making southern Thailand ungovernable, which it has largely succeeded in. It sees no reason for negotiations and is against talks with other insurgent groups. The BRN-C has the vision of becoming a mass-organisation.

- BRN-Congress or BRN-K (BRN-Kongres), led by Rosa Burako, has been pursuing a military struggle but is currently less active.
- BRN-Ulama. There is little information about this subgroup.

=== BRN-Koordinasi ===
==== Structure ====
The Pejuang Kemerdekaan Patani (Patani Independence Fighters) are the paramilitary wing of the BRN-C. These militant units operate in the rural areas of southern Thailand working along with the BRN-Coordinate leadership in a loosely organised strictly clandestine cell system dependent on hard-line religious leaders for direction.

==== Activities ====
Since 2004, the BRN-C has been involved in numerous arson, bombing, and murder attacks to create an atmosphere of fear and uncertainty in the three southern provinces of Thailand. Thai military observers believe that the attacks are mostly carried out by its loosely affiliated and clandestine RKK outfit. In total, the southern insurgency has killed more than 6,000 people.

Tactics include the double-tap strike i.e. setting two bombs at one location, with the second designed to kill and injure those attending the aftermath of the first. It is the main group behind the murder of teachers in the Southern Border Provinces.

On 1 May 2013, insurgents attacked a restaurant in the Pattani Region. The perpetrators, armed with machine guns, killed six people including a two-year-old child. The act was stated by the perpetrators to be retaliation for the deaths of some militants.

==== Use of children ====
In 2013 and 2014, the UN received reports that the BRN and other armed groups had recruited boys and girls from the age of 14; children were given military training and assigned as combatants, informants and scouts. No such reports were recorded by the UN in 2015 or 2016.

=== Peace talks ===
In January 2020, the Thai Peace Dialogue Panel, led by General Wanlop Rugsanaoh, met with BRN representative Anas Abdulrahman in Kuala Lumpur, in what was described as "the first round of official peace dialogue" by BRN official Abdul Aziz Jabal. The two sides reportedly agreed on a framework for further negotiations.

== See also ==
- Salafi jihadism
- South Thailand insurgency
- Tak Bai incident
- War on terror
- Gaza war protests
