= Malaysia women's national football team results (2020–present) =

This article provides details of international football games played by the Malaysia women's national football team in 2020s.

== Result ==
Key
Win
Draw
Defeat

=== 2021 ===
19 September 2022 AFC WACQ	Malaysia	0–4	Thailand	Al-Ram, Palestine
		Report	Kanyanat 1', 37', 90+2'; Nutwadee 2'	Stadium: Faisal Al-Husseini International Stadium; Referee: Cha Min-ji (South Korea)

22 September 2022 AFC WACQ	Palestine	0–2	Malaysia	Al-Ram, Palestine
		Report	Andrea 57'; Steffi 82'	Stadium: Faisal Al-Husseini International Stadium; Referee: Esra'a Al-Mbaidin (Jordan)

=== 2022 ===
23 June Friendly	Bangladesh	6–0	Malaysia	Dhaka, Bangladesh
BST (UTC+6)		Report		Stadium: Bir Sherestha Shaheed Shipahi Mostafa Kamal Stadium

26 June Friendly	Bangladesh	0–0	Malaysia	Dhaka, Bangladesh
BST (UTC+6)		Report		Stadium: Bir Sherestha Shaheed Shipahi Mostafa Kamal Stadium

4 July 2022 AFF Women's Championship	Singapore	0–0	Malaysia	Manila, Philippines
16:00 UTC+8		Report		Stadium: Rizal Memorial Stadium; Attendance: 235; Referee: Aung Seinn Cho (Myanmar)

6 July 2022 AFF Women's Championship	Indonesia	1–1	Malaysia	Laguna, Philippines
16:00 UTC+8	Sheva 74'	Report	Steffi 90+2'	Stadium: Biñan Football Stadium; Referee: Plong Pichakara (Cambodia)

8 July 2022 AFF Women's Championship	Malaysia	0–4	Philippines	Laguna, Philippines
19:00 UTC+8		Report	Eggesvik 32'; Guillou 42'; Quezada 49'; Castañeda 73'	Stadium: Biñan Football Stadium; Attendance: 429; Referee: Thein Thein Aye (Myanmar)

10 July 2022 AFF Women's Championship	Malaysia	0–4	Thailand	Cavite, Philippines
19:00 UTC+8		Report	Ploychompoo 25'; Pattaranan 55'; U-raiporn 74'; Nutwadee 86'	Stadium: Imus Grandstand; Attendance: 32; Referee: Plong Pichakara (Cambodia)

12 July 2022 AFF Women's Championship	Australia U-23	6–0	Malaysia	Cavite, Philippines
19:00 UTC+8	Dawber 13', 24'; Hawkesby 20', 66', 68'; McNamara 82'	Report		Stadium: Imus Grandstand; Referee: Công Thị Dung (Vietnam)

=== 2023 ===
3 May 2023 Southeast Asian Games	Vietnam	3–0	Malaysia	Phnom Penh, Cambodia
16:00 UTC+7	Phạm Hải Yến 5'; Nguyễn Thị Bích Thùy 24'; Jaciah 34' (o.g.)			Stadium: RCAF Old Stadium

6 May 2023 Southeast Asian Games	Malaysia	0–1	Philippines	Phnom Penh, Cambodia
			Bolden 90+8'	Stadium: RCAF Stadium

9 May 2023 Southeast Asian Games	Myanmar	5–1	Malaysia	Phnom Penh, Cambodia
16:00	July Kyaw 3', 40'; Khin Marlar Tun 27'; San Thaw Thaw 62', 83'		Intan 59'	Stadium: RCAF Old Stadium

18 September 2023 Women's Friendly Tournament	Saudi Arabia	0–0	Malaysia	Taif, Saudi Arabia
20:30 UTC+3				Stadium: King Fahd Sports City

21 September 2023 Women's Friendly Tournament	Malaysia	0–0	Pakistan	Taif, Saudi Arabia
16:00 UTC+3				Stadium: King Fahd Sports City

27 September 2023 Women's Friendly Tournament SF	Lebanon	0–0 (a.e.t.) (4–3 p)	Malaysia	Taif, Saudi Arabia
16:00 UTC+3		Report		Stadium: King Fahd Sports City; Referee: Khuloud AlZaabi (United Arab Emirates)
	Penalties
	L. Iskandar (penalty scored); Salha (penalty missed); Abdin (penalty scored); C. Iskandar (penalty missed); Awad (penalty missed); Arabi (penalty missed); Bou Hamra (penalty scored); Al Kasti (penalty scored)		(penalty scored) Steffi; (penalty missed) Intan; (penalty missed) Arissa; (penalty scored) Lyana; (penalty missed) Faizah; (penalty missed) Azurin; (penalty scored) Usliza; (penalty missed) Najwa

30 September 2023 Women's Friendly Tournament 3rd place	Saudi Arabia	0–1	Malaysia	Taif, Saudi Arabia
16:30 UTC+3			Steffi 45+4'	Stadium: King Fahd Sports City

=== 2024 ===
23 October Friendly	Saudi Arabia	0–0	Malaysia	Dubai, United Arab Emirates
20:00 UTC+4		Report		Stadium: Police Officers' Club Stadium

26 October Friendly	Malaysia	3–1	Laos	Dubai, United Arab Emirates
20:00 UTC+4	Juliana 23'; Adrienna 30'; Ayuna 63'	Report	Inthida 18'	Stadium: Police Officers' Club Stadium

26 November 2024 AFF Women's Cup GS	Malaysia	0–1	Indonesia	Vientiane, Laos
19:30 UTC+7		Report	Scheunemann 79'	Stadium: New Laos National Stadium; Referee: Asaka Koizumi (Japan)

29 November 2024 AFF Women's Cup GS	Cambodia	2–0	Malaysia	Vientiane, Laos
15:00 UTC+7	Kunthea 18'; Sapheourn 45+2'	Report		Stadium: New Laos Reserve Field; Referee: Cha Min-ji (South Korea)

=== 2025 ===
31 May Tri-Nation Cup	Malaysia	1–2	Hong Kong	Thimphu, Bhutan
18:00 UTC+6	Steffi 38'	Report	Fung 25'; Ho 79'	Stadium: Changlimithang Stadium

3 June Tri-Nation Cup	Bhutan	1–3	Malaysia	Thimphu, Bhutan
18:00 UTC+6	Bidha 24'	Report	Intan 29'; Ainsyah 45+5'; Farahiyah 90+7'	Stadium: Changlimithang Stadium

18 June Friendly	United Arab Emirates	1–3	Malaysia	Al Khawaneej, Dubai, United Arab Emirates
7:45 UTC+4	45'	Report	Nurfazira 16'; Intan 49'; Adrienna 67'	Stadium: Theyab Awana Stadium

22 June Friendly	United Arab Emirates	0–2	Malaysia	Al Khawaneej, Dubai, United Arab Emirates
7:45 UTC+4		Report	Adrienna 24'; Farahiyah 25'	Stadium: Theyab Awana Stadium

29 June 2026 AFC Women's Asian Cup qualification	Malaysia	1–0	Palestine	Dushanbe, Tajikistan
19:00 UTC+5	Farahiyah 86'	Report (AFC)		Stadium: Pamir Stadium; Referee: Yang Shu-ting (Chinese Taipei)

2 July 2026 AFC Women's Asian Cup qualification	Tajikistan	0–1	Malaysia	Dushanbe, Tajikistan
22:00 UTC+5		Report (AFC)	Henrietta 90+2'	Stadium: Pamir Stadium; Referee: Trần Thị Thanh (Vietnam)

5 July 2026 AFC Women's Asian Cup qualification	North Korea	6–0	Malaysia	Dushanbe, Tajikistan
19:00 UTC+5	Hye-yong 39'; Yu-jong 46'; Kyong-yong 52', 55', 78'; Hye-gyong 90+6'	Report (AFC)		Stadium: Pamir Stadium; Referee: Rawdha Almansoori (United Arab Emirates)

22 October Closed Door Friendly	Hong Kong	3–2	Malaysia	Tseung Kwan O, Hong Kong
16:00 UTC+8	Wai Ki Cheung 42'; Po Yan Chu 60', 68'	Report	Fazira 11'; Najwa 30'	Stadium: Jockey Club HKFA Football Training Centre

25 October Friendly	Hong Kong	5–0	Malaysia	Kowloon, Hong Kong
18:00 UTC+8	Leung Hong Kiu Anke 2' (pen.), 33', 47'; Chan Yee Hing 59'; Kwan Wing Yu 85'	Report		Stadium: Kai Tak Youth Sports Ground

26 November 2025 Bangladesh Tri-Nations Cup	Bangladesh	0–1	Malaysia	Dhaka, Bangladesh
18:00 UTC+6		Report	Nur Ainsyah 29'	Stadium: National Stadium; Referee: Om Choki (Bhutan)

29 November 2025 Bangladesh Tri-Nations Cup	Malaysia	0–2	Azerbaijan	Dhaka, Bangladesh
18:00 UTC+6		Report	Bozdağ 3'; Mirzaliyeva 23'	Stadium: National Stadium; Referee: Anjana Rai (Nepal)

5 December 2025 SEA Games	Vietnam	7–0	Malaysia	Chonburi, Thailand
18:30 UTC+7	Phạm Hải Yến 4', 26'; Nguyễn Thị Bích Thùy 23'; Trần Thị Hải Linh 36'; Thái Thị Thảo 48', 59', 78'	Report		Stadium: Thailand National Sports University Chonburi; Referee: Rawdha Almansoori (United Arab Emirates)

8 December 2025 SEA Games	Malaysia	0–3	Myanmar	Chonburi, Thailand
16:00 UTC+7		Report	San Thaw Thaw 25'; May Htet Lu 35'; Win Theingi Tun 64'	Stadium: Thailand National Sports University Chonburi; Referee: Alesar Baddour (Syria)

11 December 2025 SEA Games	Philippines	6–0	Malaysia	Chonburi, Thailand
16:00 UTC+7	Pino 45', 53', 70' (pen.); Cowart 68'; Markey 85'; Castañeda 90+6'			Stadium: Thailand National Sports University Chonburi; Referee: Sunita Thongthawin (Thailand)

=== 2026 ===
3 June Friendly	Jordan	4–3	Malaysia	Amman, Jordan
18:00 UTC+3	M. Abu Tayeh 7'; Siti Nurfaizah 46' (o.g.); Jbarah 79'; Al Fararjeh 90+5'	Report; Report	Ainsyah 18'; Najwa 25', 37'	Stadium: King Abdullah Stadium

6 June Friendly	Malaysia	0–2	Palestine	Amman, Jordan
18:00 UTC+2		Report	Saavedra 60'; Asad-Halim 62'	Stadium: Petra Stadium; Referee: Esraa Al-Mbaiden (Jordan)

10 July 2026 AFF Women's Cup	Laos	1–1	Malaysia	Kuala Lumpur, Malaysia
20:45 UTC+8	Kemmy 37'	Report	Nurhadfina 50'	Stadium: Kuala Lumpur Stadium; Referee: Asaka Koizumi (Japan)

16 July 2026 AFF Women's Cup	Malaysia	1–3	Singapore	Kuala Lumpur, Malaysia
16:45 UTC+8	Henrietta 58'	Report	Suresh 12'; Tan 44', 72' (pen.)	Stadium: Kuala Lumpur Stadium; Referee: Pansa Chaisanit (Thailand)

9 October Friendly	Saudi Arabia	2–0	Malaysia	Doha, Qatar
19:00 UTC+3	Tawfiq 87'; Al-Saiari 90'	Report		Stadium: Aspire Academy Stadium

13 October Friendly	Saudi Arabia	0–1	Malaysia	Doha, Qatar
19:00 UTC+3		Report	Mahrt 5'	Stadium: Aspire Academy Stadium
