= 2024 Malaysia National Women's League =

National Women's League
- Season: 2024
- Champions: Kelana United
- AFC Champions League: Kelana United
- Matches: 56
- Goals: 100 (1.79 per match)
- Top goalscorer: 18 goals Intan Sarah (Kelana United); Siti Nur Khaleeda Ismail (Malaysian University)
- Biggest home win: 15 goals (Sabah FA 15–0 Real CJ F.C.) (16 September 2024)
- Biggest away win: 16 goals (Real CJ F.C. 0–16 Malaysian University) (9 Ogos 2024)
- Highest scoring: 16 goals (Real CJ F.C. 0–16 Malaysian University) (9 Ogos 2024)
- Longest winning run: 3 matches Kelana United
- Longest unbeaten run: 3 matches Kelana United
- Longest winless run: 3 matches Real CJ F.C.
- Longest losing run: 3 matches Real CJ F.C.
- Highest attendance: 320 (Sabah FA 0–2 Kelana United) (21 July 2024)
- Lowest attendance: 0 (Kelana United 12–0 Melaka FA) (7 December 2024)

The 2024 Malaysia National Women's League (Malay: Liga Wanita Nasional 2024) was the third edition of the National Women's League, one of the women's football league in Malaysia since its establishment in 2023. It is run by the Football Association of Malaysia together with the Ministry of Youth and Sports and features 8 teams. The League was created to provide a safe football atmosphere for women, in addition to being a platform to promote the amateur women's football scene in the Malaysia.

The defending champion from the 2023 Malaysia National Women's League season was Sabah FA.

== Changes from last season ==
=== Team changes ===
New Team

- (Malacca) Melaka FA
- (Kedah) Red Eagles S.C.
- (Penang) Real CJ F.C.

Withdrawn

- (Perak) LMS Tigress F.C.

== Teams ==
Below are the list of clubs who will join the 2024 season, based on the status gained from Football Association of Malaysia.

=== Venues ===
Team	Location	Stadium
(Selangor) Kelana United	Cheras	Kuala Lumpur Stadium
(Malaysia) Malaysian University	Shah Alam	UiTM Stadium
Sabah FA	Kota Kinabalu	Likas Stadium
SSM Pahang	Bandar Tun Razak, Jengka	Tun Abdul Razak Stadium
Selangor	Subang Jaya	Arena MBSJ
(Malacca) Melaka FA	Malacca City	Hang Tuah Stadium UiTM Stadium, Shah Alam
(Kedah) Red Eagles S.C.	Alor Setar	Darul Aman Stadium
(Penang) Real CJ F.C.	Kepala Batas, Seberang Perai	MBSP Sports Complex

=== Locations ===
Locations of teams in the 2024 Malaysia Women's National League

== Personnel, kit and sponsoring ==
Team	Head coach	Captain	Kit manufacturer	Sponsor
Kelana United	(Malaysia) Fairuz Montana	(Malaysia) Steffi Sarge Kaur	Forfit	Shamsuddin & Co.
Malaysian University	(Malaysia) Fairuz Mohd Noor	(Malaysia) Fatin Shahida Azmi	Let's Play Performance	
Sabah FA	(Malaysia) Timbangan @ Gosutim bin Ganai	(Malaysia) Nurul Azurin Mazlan	Maxumax	Sawit Kinabalu
SSM Pahang	(Malaysia) Zerry Nazeri	(Malaysia) Fatin Alissa Qistyna	Evarado design	Evarado design
Selangor	(Malaysia) Osmera Omaro	(Malaysia) Nur Lyana Soberi	Joma	Blast
Melaka	(Malaysia) Kok Keng Lin	(Malaysia) Malini Nordin	AL Sports	
Red Eagles S.C.	(Malaysia) Mohd Firdaus Azid	(Malaysia) Nurul Izzati Zainol	Ma7ch	
Real CJ F.C.	(Malaysia) Marzizul Yusoff	(Malaysia) Wan Ainul Aeman	Hakka Clo	

== Standings ==
=== League table ===
Pos	Team	Pld	W	D	L	GF	GA	GD	Pts	Qualification or relegation
1	Kelana United (C)	14	12	1	1	58	5	+53	37	Qualification for AFC Champions League
2	Sabah FA	14	10	1	3	54	13	+41	31	
3	Selangor	14	9	2	3	49	6	+43	29	
4	Malaysian University	14	8	2	4	57	19	+38	26	Withdrew from 2025 Malaysia National Women's League
5	Melaka FA	14	5	1	8	24	37	−13	16	Withdrew from 2025 Malaysia National Women's League
6	Red Eagles S.C.	14	4	1	9	12	35	−23	13	
7	SSM Pahang	14	3	2	9	9	35	−26	11	Withdrew from 2025 Malaysia National Women's League
8	Real CJ F.C.	14	0	0	14	1	114	−113	0	Withdrew from 2025 Malaysia National Women's League

Updated to match(es) played on 21 December 2024. Source: FAM-CMS
Rules for classification: 1) Points; 2) Goal difference; 3) Number of goals scored.
(C) League Champion

=== Position by round ===
Team ╲ Round	1	2	3	4	5	6	7	8	9	10	11	12	13	14
Kelana United	4	1	1	1	2	1	1	2	1	1	1	1	1	1
Sabah FA	3	2	4	3	3	2	2	1	2	2	3	3	2	2
Selangor	5	3	2	4	4	4	3	3	3	3	2	2	3	3
Malaysian University	6	4	5	5	5	5	5	4	4	4	4	4	4	4
Melaka FA	1	5	3	2	1	3	4	5	5	5	5	5	5	5
Red Eagles S.C.	8	7	7	7	7	7	7	7	7	7	7	7	7	6
SSM Pahang	2	6	6	6	6	6	6	6	6	6	6	6	6	7
Real CJ F.C.	7	8	8	8	8	8	8	8	8	8	8	8	8	8

Leader & Qualification for AFC Women's Champions League

Source: FAM-CMS

== Results table ==
Home \ Away	SBH	KEL	MAU	MEL	RCJ	RED	SEL	SSM
Sabah FA		0–2	3–2	7–0	15–0	2–0	2–1	6–0
Kelana United	2–2		4–1	12–0	8–0	5–0	1–0	2–0
Malaysian University	4–1	1–5		5–1	9–0	4–1	1–1	4–0
Melaka FA	1–3	1–0	2–0		11–0	0–3	0–2	0–3
Real CJ F.C.	0–8	0–7	0–16	1–5		0–4	0–9	0–3
Red Eagles S.C.	0–3	0–4	0–6	0–3	1–0		0–5	3–0
Selangor	1–0	0–1	1–1	1–0	15–0	3–0		6–0
SSM Pahang	0–2	0–5	0–3	0–0	3–0	0–0	0–4	

Updated to match(es) played on 21 December 2024. Source: FAM-CMS
Legend: Blue = home team win; Yellow = draw; Red = away team win.
For upcoming matches, an "a" indicates there is an article about the rivalry between the two participants.

=== Fixtures and results ===
Round 1

==== Matchweek 1 ====
6 July 2024	Kelana United	1–0	Selangor	Cheras
16:00 UTC+8	Lauren Hoh Ruyi 93'	Report		Stadium: Kuala Lumpur Stadium; Attendance: 150; Referee: Ahmad Faris Hafizi

6 July 2024	Red Eagles S.C.	0–3	Melaka FA	Sintok
21:00 UTC+8		Report	Siti Nurmaizatul Sarah 27'; Nurul Arliana Nabila 61'; Puteri Noralisa Wilkinson 71'	Stadium: UUM Mini Stadium; Attendance: 100; Referee: Mohd Zakuan Silah

7 July 2024	SSM Pahang	3–0	Real CJ F.C.	Bandar Tun Razak, Jengka
16:00 UTC+8	Nurul Nabila (o.g.) 31'; Nurhadfina 64'; Ku Nuwairah 72'	Report		Stadium: Tun Abdul Razak Stadium; Attendance: 100; Referee: Mohd Fazli bin Abdul Jalil

7 July 2024	Sabah FA	3–2	Malaysian University	Kota Kinabalu
16:00 UTC+8	Usliza Usman 26'; Haindee Mosroh 53'; Juliana Barek 57'	Report	Nurfazira 68'; Siti Nur Khaleeda 89'	Stadium: Likas Stadium; Attendance: 150; Referee: Hilton Soibik

==== Matchweek 2 ====
13 July 2024	Red Eagles S.C.	0–5	Selangor	Alor Setar
17:00 UTC+8		Report	Mira Fazliana (o.g.) 3'; Adrienna Zamzaihiri 17'; Nur Najwa Irdina 28'; Dian Aqilah 47'; Nur Ainsyah 60'	Stadium: Darul Aman Stadium; Attendance: 200; Referee: Mohd Zakuan Silah

14 July 2024	Real CJ F.C.	0–7	Kelana United	Kepala Batas
09:00 UTC+8		Report	Intan Sarah 5', 36', 55', 61', 78', 90+2'; Lovelytha Jelus 88'	Stadium: Bertam Mini Stadium; Attendance: 100; Referee: Khye Chun Ko

14 July 2024	Malaysian University	4–0	SSM Pahang	Shah Alam
17:00 UTC+8	Siti Nur Khaleeda 50', 56'; Fatin Shahida 16'; Nurfazira 78'	Report		Stadium: UiTM Stadium; Attendance: 250; Referee: Dinesh Balan

14 July 2024	Melaka FA	1–3	Sabah FA	Melaka City
17:00 UTC+8	Malini Nordin 78'	Report	Juliana Barek 19'; Azzlyeanieh 40'; Rocillyeka 83'	Stadium: Hang Tuah Stadium; Attendance: 300; Referee: Alim Haziq Zaimi

==== Matchweek 3 ====
20 July 2024	Sabah FA	0–2	Kelana United	Kota Kinabalu
16:00 UTC+8		Report	Lovelytha 24'; Intan Sarah 36'	Stadium: Likas Stadium; Attendance: 320; Referee: Zenosico Tuntul

21 July 2024	Real CJ F.C.	0–9	Selangor	Batu Kawan
16:00 UTC+8		Report	Dayana Athilia (o.g.) 37'; Nur Adrienna 20', 52'; Najwa Irdina 50', 66', 84'; Dian Aqialh 62'; Nur Ainsyah 86', 90+2'	Stadium: Penang State Stadium; Attendance: 165; Referee: Muhamad Hanif Sa’adin

21 July 2024	Melaka FA	2–0	Malaysian University	Shah Alam
16:00 UTC+8	Nurul Arliana Nabila 1'; Siti Azzah Azwa Ezati 47'	Report		Stadium: UiTM Stadium; Attendance: 139; Referee: Nurul Ain Izatty Binti Zainal

21 December 2024	Red Eagles S.C.	3–0	SSM Pahang	Jitra
17:00 UTC+8	Muskan Abdul Majid 52'; Munirah 53'; Nur Qaisara Inarah 77'	Report		Stadium: MPKP Mini Stadium; Attendance: 100; Referee: Izzat Izaini Ali

==== Matchweek 4 ====
27 July 2024	Red Eagles S.C.	1–0	Real CJ F.C.	Alor Setar
17:00 UTC+8	Muskan 24'	Report		Stadium: Darul Aman Stadium; Attendance: 150; Referee: S. Hemanathan

27 July 2024	Malaysian University	1–1	Selangor	Shah Alam
17:00 UTC+8	Nur Syafiqah 15'	Report	Nur Ainsyah 83'	Stadium: UiTM Stadium; Attendance: 100; Referee: Mohd Hafizuan Bin Mohd Khair

27 July 2024	Melaka FA	1–0	Kelana United	Shah Alam
21:00 UTC+8	Siti Nurmaizatul Sarah 31'	Report		Stadium: UiTM Stadium; Attendance: 200; Referee: Muhammad Afiq Bin Mohd Roslibe

18 September 2024	SSM Pahang	0–2	Sabah FA	Shah Alam
17:00 UTC+8		Report	Henrietta Justine 28'; Juliana Barek 66'	Stadium: UiTM Stadium; Attendance: 100; Referee: Muhammad Faizal Bin Ghazali

==== Matchweek 5 ====
3 August 2024	Melaka FA	11–0	Real CJ F.C.	Shah Alam
17:00 UTC+8	Marlia Basri 14'; Puteri Noralisa 19', 36', 41'; Siti Azzah Azwa Ezati 31', 65', 70'; Malini Nordin 47', 66'; Nurul Ain Afiqah 76'; A. Nuraziela 80'	Report		Stadium: UiTM Stadium; Attendance: 150; Referee: Anselm Anak Enterang

3 August 2024	Kelana United	4–1	Malaysian University	Cheras
21:00 UTC+8	Lovelytha Jelus 9'; Waitie Taming 22'; Lauren Hoh Ruyi 49' (pen.); Intan Sarah 86'	Report	Fatin Shahida Azmi 52'	Stadium: Kuala Lumpur Stadium; Attendance: 139; Referee: Nurul Hafizah Binti Nuradin

4 August 2024	Sabah FA	2–0	Red Eagles S.C.	Kota Kinabalu
16:00 UTC+8	Jaciah Jumilis 82'; Henrietta Justine 90+2'	Report		Stadium: Likas Stadium; Attendance: 150; Referee: Gabrielle Tinggal Anak Lensi

4 August 2024	SSM Pahang	0–4	Selangor	Bandar Tun Razak, Jengka
17:00 UTC+8		Report	Nurin Umairah 32'; Nur Ainsyah 45+3', 47', 90+4'	Stadium: Tun Abdul Razak Stadium; Attendance: 150; Referee: Mohd Faizal Jaini

==== Matchweek 6 ====
9 August 2024	Real CJ F.C.	0–16	Malaysian University	Kepala Batas
09:00 UTC+8		Report	Fatin Shahida 10', 13'; Putri Arissa 15', 90+3'; Siti Nur Khaleeda 18', 21', 29', 45+1', 51'; Andrea Lee Xin Yi 40'; Nurfazira 48', 62', 78'; Nur Harizah 70'; Anis Aishah Asiati 84', 86'	Stadium: Bertam Mini Stadium; Attendance: 150; Referee: Muhammad Nidhzam Bin Abd. Razak

9 August 2024	Sabah FA	2–1	Selangor	Kota Kinabalu
16:00 UTC+8	Azzlyeanieh Kinuli 13'; Jaciah Jumilis 15'	Report	Nur Ainsyah Murad 90+4'	Stadium: Likas Stadium; Attendance: 139; Referee: Shahrudin bin Siampak

9 August 2024	Melaka FA	0–3	SSM Pahang	Shah Alam
21:00 UTC+8		Report	Damia Zulaikha 51' (pen.); K. Thurgasini 69'; Fatin Alissa Qistyna 90+1'	Stadium: UiTM Stadium; Attendance: 150; Referee: Dinesh Ravichandran

10 August 2024	Red Eagles S.C.	0–4	Kelana United	Alor Setar
17:00 UTC+8		Report	Lovelytha Jelus 7', 10'; Siti Asnidah 61'; Nur Afrina 74'	Stadium: Sultan Abdul Halim Stadium; Attendance: 100; Referee: Shukor Zulkiflee

==== Matchweek 7 ====
1 September 2024	Red Eagles S.C.	0–6	Malaysian University	Jitra
17:00 UTC+8		Report	Ayuna 5'; Andrea 21'; Anis Aishah 66'; Nur Syafiqah 68'; Siti Nur Khaleeda 83', 86'	Stadium: MPKP Mini Stadium; Attendance: 100; Referee: Nur Amali Ihsanuddin

8 September 2024	Kelana United	2–0	SSM Pahang	Kuala Lumpur
17:00 UTC+8	Nur Salina Bel 45+1'; Lovelytha Jelus 84'	Report		Stadium: Merdeka Stadium; Attendance: 150; Referee: Muhammad Afiq Bin Mohd Roslibe

8 September 2024	Selangor	1–0	Melaka FA	Kuala Lumpur
21:00 UTC+8	Nur Ainsyah Murad 84'	Report		Stadium: Merdeka Stadium; Attendance: 150; Referee: Abdul Halim bin Mohammad

14 September 2024	Real CJ F.C.	0–8	Sabah FA	Kepala Batas
09:00 UTC+8		Report	Jaciah Jumilis 13'; Rosdianah Adeline 26'; Azzlyeanieh Kinuli 41', 73'; Delvira Mailu 62'; Nadia Roslan 65'; Nelly Jamini 85'; Rocillyeka Lole 88'	Stadium: Bertam Mini Stadium; Attendance: 200; Referee: Kamal Ikhwan Yaacob

Round 2

==== Matchweek 8 ====
14 September 2024	Malaysian University	4–1	Red Eagles S.C.	Kuala Lumpur
21:00 UTC+8	Andrea Lee Xin Yi 17', 32'; Siti Nur Khaleeda 35', 82'	Report		Stadium: Merdeka Stadium; Attendance: 50; Referee: Muhammad Radzi Bin Asari

15 September 2024	SSM Pahang	0–5	Kelana United	Bandar Tun Razak, Jengka
17:00 UTC+8		Report	Steffi 8', 71'; Lovelytha Jelus 58', 65'; Thurgasini 78'(o.g.)	Stadium: Tun Abdul Razak Stadium; Attendance: 100; Referee: Ismail Bin Saidi

15 September 2024	Melaka FA	0–2	Selangor	Kuala Lumpur
17:00 UTC+8		Report	Nur Ainsyah Murad 41' (pen.); Nur Adrienna 45+1'	Stadium: Merdeka Stadium; Attendance: 70; Referee: Nurul Hafizah Binti Nuradin

16 September 2024	Sabah FA	15–0	Real CJ F.C.	Kepala Batas
09:00 UTC+8	Henrietta 3', 8', 43', 90+4'; Azzlyeanieh 21', 31', 49', 66', 84'; Jaciah Jumilis 25'; Juliana Barek 39' (pen.); Ainie Tulis 45+2'; Rocillyeka Lole 55', 80'; Nadia Roslan 86'	Report		Stadium: Bertam Mini Stadium; Attendance: 100; Referee: Muhammad Nidhzam Bin Abd Razak

==== Matchweek 9 ====
21 September 2024	Malaysian University	9–0	Real CJ F.C.	Kuala Lumpur
17:00 UTC+8	Siti Nur Khaleeda 6', 39', 62', 65'; Ayuna Anjani 8', 88'; Nur Harizah 10'; Nabila Shahirah 72'; Andrea Lee Xin Yi 86'	Report		Stadium: Merdeka Stadium; Attendance: 50; Referee: Nurul Ain Izatty Zainal

21 September 2024	Kelana United	5–0	Red Eagles S.C.	Kuala Lumpur
21:00 UTC+8	Lovelytha Jelus 26'; Intan Sarah 39', 46'; Nur Dhiyaa Addin 52'; Nur Safura 90+1'	Report		Stadium: Merdeka Stadium; Attendance: 56; Referee: Nurul Hafizah Binti Nuradin

22 September 2024	SSM Pahang	0–0	Melaka FA	Bandar Tun Razak, Jengka
09:00 UTC+8		Report		Stadium: Tun Abdul Razak Stadium; Attendance: 100; Referee: Kishandharan Gopal

22 September 2024	Selangor	1–0	Sabah FA	Kuala Lumpur
21:00 UTC+8	Nur Adrienna 81'	Report		Stadium: Merdeka Stadium; Attendance: 150; Referee: Ahmad Nawawi Amir

==== Matchweek 10 ====
28 September 2024	Real CJ F.C.	1–5	Melaka FA	Jitra
17:00 UTC+8	Ariesya Amlin 84'	Report	Meizora Mukol 35'; Nur Farah Wahida 47', 51', 64'; Maznah Ali 90+4'	Stadium: MPKP Mini Stadium; Attendance: 100; Referee: Ammar Rosdi

28 September 2024	Malaysian University	1–5	Kelana United	Shah Alam
17:00 UTC+8	Siti Nur Khaleeda 61'	Report	Steffi 8' (pen.) 49'; Intan Sarah 45+1'; Nursalina Bel 52'; Waitie Taming 53'	Stadium: UiTM Stadium; Attendance: 70; Referee: Arif Ismail

29 September 2024	Selangor	6–0	SSM Pahang	Shah Alam
17:00 UTC+8	Nuratiqah Batrisyia 17', 34', 74'; Nur Adrienna 29'; Dian Aqilah 61'; Nur Marissa Aleya 89'	Report		Stadium: UiTM Stadium; Attendance: 60; Referee: Faizal Ghazali

8 December 2024	Red Eagles S.C.	0–3	Sabah FA	Jitra
17:00 UTC+8		Report	Juliana Barek 20'; Nurhalizah Ahmad 56'; Nelly Jamini 90+3'	Stadium: MPKP Mini Stadium; Attendance: 50; Referee: Hafiy Hazmi

==== Matchweek 11 ====
12 October 2024	Malaysian University	5–1	Melaka FA	Shah Alam
17:00 UTC+8	Nabila Shahirah 14'; Andrea Lee Xin Yi 23'; Nur Fazira 53'; Fatin Shahida 62'; Nur Eryla Syazwien 71'	Report	Nasuha Nasha 78'	Stadium: UiTM Stadium; Attendance: 100; Referee: Amir Fakhri Ismail

13 October 2024	SSM Pahang	0–0	Red Eagles S.C.	Bandar Tun Razak, Jengka
09:00 UTC+8		Report		Stadium: Tun Abdul Razak Stadium; Attendance: 100; Referee: Kishandharan Gopal

13 October 2024	Selangor	15–0	Real CJ F.C.	Shah Alam
09:00 UTC+8	Nur Ainsyah 9', 22', 57'; Nur Marissa Aleya 11', 20'; Nur Adrienna 14', 90+1'; Eva Antinus 19', 24'; Nur Amirah 29', 52'; Asma Munajati 29'; Eusvewana 59', 67', 90+2'	Report		Stadium: UiTM Stadium; Attendance: 50; Referee: Mohd Johafahmi Bin Taib

21 December 2024	Kelana United	2–2	Sabah FA	Kuala Lumpur
20:45 UTC+8	Lovelytha Jelus 30'; Salina Bel 90+1'	Report	Azzlyeanieh Kinuli 4'; Juliana Barek 13'	Stadium: Merdeka Stadium; Attendance: 575; Referee: Nurul Ain Izatty Zainal

==== Matchweek 12 ====
9 November 2024	Real CJ F.C.	0–3	SSM Pahang	George Town, Penang
17:00 UTC+8		Report	K. Thurgasini 16', 34'; Ku Nuwairah 54' (pen.)	Stadium: Padang USM A Attendance: 50; Referee: Ko Khye Chun

10 November 2024	Selangor	0–1	Kelana United	Shah Alam
17:00 UTC+8		Report	Farahiyah 79'	Stadium: UiTM Stadium; Attendance: 200; Referee: Nurul Ain Izatty Binti Zainal

10 November 2024	Malaysian University	4–1	Sabah FA	Shah Alam
17:00 UTC+8				Stadium: UiTM Stadium

10 November 2024	Melaka FA	0–3	Red Eagles S.C.	Kuala Lumpur
17:00 UTC+8		Report		Stadium: UM Arena Stadium

==== Matchweek 13 ====
2 November 2024	SSM Pahang	0–3	Malaysian University	Bandar Tun Razak, Jengka
17:00 UTC+8		Report	Nur Fazira 45+3', 90+3'; Andrea Lee 74'	Stadium: Tun Abdul Razak Stadium; Attendance: 100; Referee: Mohd Firdaus bin Mohd Taib

2 November 2024	Selangor	3–0	Red Eagles S.C.	Shah Alam
17:00 UTC+8	Nur Ainsyah 7', 54'; Nur Adrienna 20'	Report		Stadium: UiTM Stadium; Attendance: 100; Referee: Nurul Hafizah Binti Nuradin

3 November 2024	Kelana United	8–0	Real CJ F.C.	Kuala Lumpur
17:00 UTC+8	Nur Safura 3', 26', 76', 92'; Waitie Taming 34'; Farahiyah 41', 70'; Nur Dhiyaa 41'	Report		Stadium: Merdeka Stadium; Attendance: 200; Referee: Muhammad Faizal Bin Ghazali

15 December 2024	Sabah FA	7–0	Melaka FA	Kota Kinabalu
17:00 UTC+8	Azzlyeanieh 6', 20', 45+4', 70'; Henrietta 37'; Haindee Mosroh 45+1'; Usliza Usman 63'	Report		Stadium: Likas Stadium; Attendance: 100; Referee: Gabrielle Tinggal Anak Lensi

==== Matchweek 14 ====
27 October 2024	Real CJ F.C.	0–4	Red Eagles S.C.	Kepala Batas
17:00 UTC+8		Report	Muskan 22'; Nur Hidayati 36'; Nurul Husna 88'; Ainur Marziah 19' (o.g.)	Stadium: Bertam Mini Stadium; Attendance: 150; Referee: Mohd Afdzal Hilmi Bin Zulkiflee

7 December 2024	Kelana United	12–0	Melaka FA	Kelana Jaya
17:00 UTC+8	Intan Sarah 5', 10', 41', 55', 64', 65', 76'; Waitie Taming 19', 21', 38'; Safura 31'; Lovelytha 48'	Report		Stadium: Wisma FAM Football Field; Attendance: 0 Referee: Mursyid Baharom

13 December 2024	Sabah FA	6–0	SSM Pahang	Kota Kinabalu
21:00 UTC+8	Henrietta 48', 50', 84'; Azzlyeanieh 66'; Nurfaizah 68'; Hellma 90+4'	Report		Stadium: Likas Stadium; Attendance: 100; Referee: Ardi Sida

21 December 2024	Selangor	1–1	Malaysian University	Kuala Lumpur
16:30 UTC+8	Nur Adrienna 53'	Report	Ayuna Anjani 72'	Stadium: Merdeka Stadium; Attendance: 150; Referee: Ikmal Rasyid Bin Azhar

== Season statistics ==
=== Top goalscorers ===
As of 21 December 2024

Rank	Player	Team	Goals
1	(Malaysia) Lovelytha Jelus	Kelana United	11
2	(Malaysia) Henrietta Justine	Sabah	10
2	(Malaysia) Nur Adrienna Zamzaihiri	Selangor	10

=== Own goals ===
As of 15 September 2024

Rank	Player	Team	Against	Date	Goal
1	Nurul Nabila	Real CJ F.C.	SSM Pahang	7 July 2024	1
1	Mira Fazliana	Red Eagles S.C.	Selangor	13 July 2024	1
1	Dayana Athilia	Real CJ F.C.	Selangor	21 July 2024	1
1	Thurgasini	SSM Pahang	Kelana United	15 September 2024	1

=== Hat-tricks ===
As of 15 December 2024

Player	For	Against	Result	Date
(Malaysia) Intan Sarah^{6}	Kelana United	Real CJ F.C.	0–7 (A)	14 July 2024
(Malaysia) Najwa Irdina	Selangor	Real CJ F.C.	0–9 (A)	21 July 2024
(Malaysia) Puteri Noralisa	Melaka FA	Real CJ F.C.	11–0 (H)	3 August 2024
(Malaysia) Siti Azzah Azwa Ezati	Melaka FA	Real CJ F.C.	11–0 (H)	3 August 2024
(Malaysia) Nur Ainsyah Murad	Selangor	Malaysian University	0–4 (A)	4 August 2024
(Malaysia) Siti Nur Khaleeda^{5}	Malaysian University	Real CJ F.C.	0–16 (A)	9 August 2024
(Malaysia) Nurfazira	Malaysian University	Real CJ F.C.	0–16 (A)	9 August 2024
(Malaysia) Henrietta Justine ^{4}	Sabah FA	Real CJ F.C.	15–0 (H)	16 September 2024
(Malaysia) Azzlyeanieh ^{4}	Sabah FA	Real CJ F.C.	15–0 (H)	16 September 2024
(Malaysia) Siti Nur Khaleeda^{4}(2)	Malaysian University	Real CJ F.C.	9–0 (H)	21 September 2024
(Malaysia) Nur Farah Wahida	Melaka FA	Real CJ F.C.	1–5 (A)	28 September 2024
(Malaysia) Nuratiqah Batrisyia	Selangor	SSM Pahang	6–0 (H)	29 September 2024
(Malaysia) Nur Ainsyah Murad(2)	Selangor	Real CJ F.C.	15–0 (H)	13 October 2024
(Malaysia) Eusvewana Kadius	Selangor	Real CJ F.C.	15–0 (H)	13 October 2024
(Malaysia) Nur Safura^{4}	Kelana United	Real CJ F.C.	8–0 (H)	3 November 2024
(Malaysia) Intan Sarah^{7}(2)	Kelana United	Melaka FA	12–0 (H)	7 December 2024
(Malaysia) Waitie Taming	Kelana United	Melaka FA	12–0 (H)	7 December 2024
(Malaysia) Henrietta Justine(2)	Sabah FA	SSM Pahang	6–0 (H)	13 December 2024
(Malaysia) Azzlyeanieh^{4}(2)	Sabah FA	Melaka FA	7–0 (H)	15 December 2024

Notes

^{4} Player scored 4 goals
^{5} Player scored 5 goals
^{6} Player scored 6 goals
^{7} Player scored 7 goals
(H) – Home team
(A) – Away team

=== Clean sheets ===
As of 21 December 2024

Rank	Player	Team	Clean sheets
1	(Malaysia) Zawani Nisha	Kelana United	8
2	(Malaysia) Ezza Ashikin	Selangor	7
3	(Malaysia) Dhiya Fatihah	Melaka	5
3	(Malaysia) Daiyana Wardina	SSMP	5
5	(Malaysia) Asma Junaidi	Sabah	4
6	(Malaysia) Azurin Mazlan	Sabah	3
7	(Malaysia) Siti Zulaikha	Red Eagles	2
7	(Malaysia) Nur Syazliana	Red Eagles	2
7	(Malaysia) Siti Noor Maslinah	Malaysian University	2
7	(Malaysia) Nuralyaa Natasha	Malaysian University	2
