= 2025 Malaysia National Women's League =

National Women's League
- Season: 2025
- Dates: 12 July – December 2025
- Champions: Sabah FA
- AFC Champions League: Sabah FA
- Matches: 4
- Goals: 18 (4.5 per match)
- Top goalscorer: 25 goals Win Theingi Tun (Sabah FA)
- Biggest home win: 9 goals (Selangor 8–1 KL Rangers) (16 July 2025)
- Biggest away win: 10 goals (KL Rangers 0–10 Sabah FA) (23 July 2025)
- Highest scoring: 10 goals (KL Rangers 0–10 Sabah FA) (23 July 2025)

The 2025 Malaysia National Women's League (Malay: Liga Wanita Nasional 2025) was the fourth edition of the national women's league, one of the women's football league in Malaysia, launched on 27 June 2024. It is run by the Football Association of Malaysia together with the Ministry of Youth and Sports and features 8 teams.

The defending champion from the 2024 Malaysia National Women's League season is Kelana United.

== Changes from last season ==
New teams

- (Kuala Lumpur) KL Rangers
- Kuala Lumpur FA
- (Selangor) MBSJ
- (Malaysia) Young Tigress

Withdrawn

- (Malaysia) Malaysian University
- SSM Pahang
- (Malacca) Melaka FA
- (Penang) Real CJ

== Venues ==
Team	Location	Stadium
(Selangor) Kelana United	Bukit Jelutong	Sime Darby Training Ground
(Kuala Lumpur) KL Rangers	Kuala Lumpur	KLFA Stadium, Kuala Lumpur
Kuala Lumpur FA	Kuala Lumpur	PKNS Sports Complex, Kelana Jaya
(Selangor) MBSJ	Subang Jaya	MBSJ Stadium
(Kedah) Red Eagles	Jitra	MPKP Mini Stadium
Sabah FA	Kota Kinabalu	Likas Stadium
Selangor	Ampang Jaya	MPAJ Stadium
(Malaysia) Young Tigress	Ampang Jaya	MPAJ Stadium

== Locations ==
Locations of teams in the 2025 Malaysia National Women's League
Klang Valley

== Personnel, kit and sponsoring ==
Team	Head coach	Captain	Kit manufacturer	Sponsor
Kelana United	(Malaysia) Fairuz Montana	(Malaysia) Siti Nurkhaleeda Ismail	Forfit	Shamsuddin & Co.
KL Rangers	(Malaysia) Mohd Arsyah Ayob	(Malaysia) Mira Fazliana Aidi	Kaki Jersi	
Kuala Lumpur FA	(Malaysia) Zulfa Arnis Marah Sultan	(Malaysia) Aina Suraya Abdul Rahman	Starsport	
MBSJ	(Malaysia) Mohd Fairuz Mohd Noor	(Malaysia) Steffi Sarge Kaur	Blackbox Sports	Blackbox Sports
Red Eagles	(Malaysia) Mohd Firdaus Azid	(Malaysia) Munirah Abdullah	Grand	KPK Group, ZUBA Resources
Sabah FA	(Malaysia) Bobby Gonzales	(Malaysia) Jaciah Jumilis	Maxumax	Sawit Kinabalu
Selangor	(Malaysia) Osmera Omaro	(Malaysia) Nur Ainsyah Murad	Joma	Blast
Young Tigress	(Malaysia) Cameron Leon Ng	(Malaysia) Nur Shadrina Ahmad Johari	Puma	

== Foreign players ==
The number of foreign players is restricted to two per each team.

Note: Flags indicate national team as has been defined under FIFA eligibility rules. Players may hold more than one non-FIFA nationality.

Team	Player 1	Player 2	Former players ^{1}
Kelana United	(Indonesia) Viny Silfianus	(Indonesia) Shalika Aurelia	(Indonesia) Helsya Maeisyaroh (Indonesia) Reva Octaviani (Indonesia) Sheva Imut (Indonesia) Vivi Oktavia
KL Rangers	(Indonesia) **Carla Bio**	(Indonesia) **Adinda Situmorang**	—N/a
Kuala Lumpur FA	(Japan) **Risa Kawai**	(Japan) **Mayu Konno**	—N/a
Red Eagles	(Nigeria) Barakat Bukola Alli	—N/a	—N/a
MBSJ	—N/a	—N/a	—N/a
Sabah FA	(South Korea) Sebin An	(Myanmar) Win Theingi Tun	—N/a
Selangor	(South Korea) **Jang Bojeong**	(Nigeria) **Esther Sunday**	(Singapore) Ernie Sulastri (Singapore) Nur Izzati Rosni
Young Tigress	—N/a	—N/a	—N/a

- Players name in **bold** indicates that the player was registered during the mid-season transfer window.
- **^1** Foreign players who left their teams or were de-registered from the playing squad due to medical issues or other matters.

== Standings ==
=== League table ===
Pos	Team	Pld	W	D	L	GF	GA	GD	Pts	Qualification or relegation
1	Sabah FA (Q)	14	12	1	1	65	5	+60	37	Qualification for 2026–27 AFC Women's Champions League
2	Selangor	14	11	1	2	62	13	+49	34	
3	MBSJ	14	10	2	2	51	14	+37	32	Withdrew from 2026 Malaysia National Women's League
4	Kelana United	14	7	1	6	31	23	+8	22	
5	Kuala Lumpur FA	14	4	3	7	19	39	−20	15	
6	KL Rangers	14	2	2	10	14	53	−39	8	Withdrew from 2026 Malaysia National Women's League
7	Young Tigress	14	1	4	9	11	61	−50	7	
8	Red Eagles	14	0	4	10	9	54	−45	4	

Updated to match(es) played on 29 December 2025. Source: FAM-CMS
Rules for classification: 1) Points; 2) Goal difference; 3) Number of goals scored.
(Q) Qualified for the phase indicated

== Results table ==
Home \ Away	KEL	KLR	KUL	MBS	RED	SBH	SEL	YOU
Kelana United		3–1	1–3	1–5	2–1	0–2	3–2	5–0
KL Rangers	1–4		0–2	1–4	1–1	0–10	0–6	1–1
Kuala Lumpur FA	2–3	3–2		0–5	0–0	1–8	0–6	2–2
MBSJ	1–0	5–1	2–1		5–2	0–0	1–1	3–0
Red Eagles	1–1	0–2	1–3	0–10		0–9	0–5	2–2
Sabah FA	3–0	6–1	4–0	4–2	4–0		4–0	6–0
Selangor	1–0	8–1	4–1	2–1	7–0	1–0		10–0
Young Tigress	0–8	0–2	1–1	1–7	3–0	0–5	1–9	

Updated to match(es) played on 29 December 2025. Source: FAM-CMS
Legend: Blue = home team win; Yellow = draw; Red = away team win.
For upcoming matches, an "a" indicates there is an article about the rivalry between the two participants.

== Season statistics ==
=== Top goalscorers ===
As of 29 December 2025

Rank	Player	Team	Goals
1	(Myanmar) Win Theingi Tun	Sabah	25
2	(Malaysia) Ainsyah Murad	Selangor	17
3	(Malaysia) Siti Nabila Jamin	Kelana United	12
4	(Malaysia) Dian Aqilah Imran	MBSJ	11
4	(Malaysia) Intan Sarah	MBSJ	11
6	(Malaysia) Laila Syamila	Kuala Lumpur	10
7	(Indonesia) Viny Silfianus	Kelana United	7
7	(Malaysia) Muskan Abdul Majid	KL Rangers	7
9	(Malaysia) Steffi Sarge Kaur	MBSJ	6
9	(Malaysia) Henrietta Justine	Sabah	6
9	(South Korea) Jang Bojeong	Selangor	6
9	(Malaysia) Nur Najwa Irdina	Selangor	6
9	(Nigeria) Esther Sunday	Selangor	6

=== Own goals ===
As of 24 July 2025

Rank	Player	Team	Against	Date	Goal
1	(Malaysia) Putri Nurbatrisyia Amani	KL Rangers	Sabah FA	23 July 2025	1
1	(Malaysia) Yusrina Syasya	Kuala Lumpur FA	Young Tigress	24 July 2025	1

=== Hat-tricks ===
As of 30 August 2025

Player	For	Against	Result	Date
(Malaysia) Intan Sarah	MBSJ	Kuala Lumpur FA	0–5 (A)	16 Jul 2025
(Malaysia) Nurin Umairah	Selangor	KL Rangers	8–1 (H)	16 Jul 2025
(Myanmar) Win Theingi Tun ^{4}	Sabah FA	KL Rangers	0–10 (H)	23 Jul 2025
(Malaysia) Henrietta Justine ^{4}	Sabah FA	KL Rangers	0–10 (H)	23 Jul 2025
(Myanmar) Win Theingi Tun ^{4} (2)	Sabah FA	Red Eagles	4–0 (H)	23 Aug 2025
(Myanmar) Win Theingi Tun (3)	Sabah FA	Selangor	4–0 (H)	30 Aug 2025
(Malaysia) Intan Sarah^{5} (2)	MBSJ	Red Eagles	0–10 (A)	30 Aug 2025

Notes

^{4} Player scored 4 goals
^{5} Player scored 5 goals
(H) – Home team
(A) – Away team
