= 2026 Malaysia National Women's League =

National Women's League
- Season: 2026
- Dates: 13 June – 31 October 2026
- Champions: Sabah FA
- Matches: 34
- Goals: 101 (2.97 per match)
- Top goalscorer: 20 goals Julissa Cisneros (Selangor)
- Biggest home win: 14 goals (Selangor 14–0 Young Tigress) (6 Sep 2026)
- Biggest away win: 9 goals (Young Tigress 0–9 Selangor) (21 June 2026)
- Highest scoring: 14 goals (Selangor 14–0 Young Tigress) (6 Sep 2026)

The 2026 Malaysia National Women's League (Malay: Liga Wanita Nasional 2026) the fifth edition of the national women's league, one of the women's football league in Malaysia. It is run by the Football Association of Malaysia together with the Ministry of Youth and Sports and features 6 teams. The season will start on 13 June and end on 31 October 2026.

The defending champion from the 2025 Malaysia National Women's League season is Sabah FA.

== Changes from last season ==
Withdrawn

- (Selangor) MBSJ
- (Kuala Lumpur) KL Rangers

== Venues ==
Team	Location	Stadium
(Selangor) Kelana United	Ampang Jaya	MPAJ Stadium
Kuala Lumpur FA	Ampang Jaya	MPAJ Stadium
(Kedah) Red Eagles	Jitra	MPKP Mini Stadium
Sabah FA	Kota Kinabalu	Penampang Stadium
Selangor	Ampang Jaya	MPAJ Stadium
(Malaysia) Young Tigress	Ampang Jaya	MPAJ Stadium

== Locations ==
Locations of teams in the 2026 Malaysia National Women's League
Klang Valley

== Personnel, kit and sponsoring ==
Team	Head coach	Captain	Kit manufacturer	Sponsor
Kelana United	(Malaysia) Fairuz Montana	(Malaysia) Nur Lyana	Zero Four	OMSB
Kuala Lumpur FA	(Malaysia) Muhammad Hafiz Hairuddin	(Malaysia) Farah Wahida Norlee	Starsport	Kuala Lumpur City Hall
Red Eagles	(Malaysia) Mohd Firdaus Azid	(Malaysia) Nurul Izzati Zainol	Grand	KPK Group
Sabah FA	(Malaysia) Bobby Gonzales	(Malaysia) Steffi Sarge Kaur	Maxumax	Sawit Kinabalu
Selangor	(Malaysia) Osmera Omaro	(Malaysia) Nur Ainsyah Murad	Joma	PKNS, MBI Selangor
Young Tigress	(Malaysia) Nidzam Adzha	(Malaysia) Nur Afrina Azhar	Puma	

== Foreign players ==
The number of foreign players is restricted to two per each team.

Note: Flags indicate national team as has been defined under FIFA eligibility rules. Players may hold more than one non-FIFA nationality.

Team	Player 1	Player 2	Player 3	Player 4	Former players ^{1}
Kelana United	(Brazil) Geovana Cardoso	(Pakistan) Maria Khan	(Indonesia) Reva Octaviani	(Indonesia) Vivi Oktavia	—N/a
Kuala Lumpur FA	(Japan) Risa Kawai	(Japan) Mayu Konno	(United States) **Sara Joy Hayduchok**	—N/a	—N/a
Red Eagles	(Nepal) Hira Kumari Bhujel	(Nepal) Nisha Thokar	(Nepal) Anita Basnet	—N/a	—N/a
Sabah FA	(United States) Delainey Varela-Keen	(South Korea) Sebin An	(United States) **Enzi Broussard**	(Japan) **Misaki Nakayama**	(United States) Mai-Lisa Atis (Japan) Ayuri Terawaki
Selangor	(Mexico) Julissa Cisneros	(Japan) Sakura Yoshida	(South Korea) Yeo Min-ji	(Chinese Taipei) **Tzu-chen Chen**	—N/a
Young Tigress	—N/a	—N/a	—N/a	—N/a	(Belgium) Nasha Nur Aini

- Players name in **bold** indicates that the player was registered during the mid-season transfer window.
- **^1** Foreign players who left their teams or were de-registered from the playing squad due to medical issues or other matters.

== Standings ==
=== League table ===
Pos	Team	Pld	W	D	L	GF	GA	GD	Pts	Qualification or relegation
1	Sabah FA (C)	10	8	2	0	29	4	+25	26	Advance to Knock-out stage & Qualification for 2027–28 AFC Women's Champions League
2	Selangor	10	8	1	1	60	5	+55	25	Advance to Knock-out stage
3	Kelana United	10	6	1	3	22	13	+9	19	Advance to Knock-out stage
4	Red Eagles	10	3	1	6	15	32	−17	10	Advance to Knock-out stage
5	Young Tigress	10	1	1	8	6	47	−41	4	
6	Kuala Lumpur FA	10	0	2	8	7	38	−31	2	

Updated to match(es) played on 17 Oct 2026. Source: FAM-CMS
Rules for classification: 1) Points; 2) Goal difference; 3) Number of goals scored.
(C) League Champion

== Results table ==
Home \ Away	KEL	KUL	RED	SBH	SEL	YOU
Kelana United		3–0	6–1	0–0	0–6	1–0
Kuala Lumpur FA	1–5		1–2	1–5	0–8	1–2
Red Eagles	0–4	2–2		0–2	0–5	6–1
Sabah FA	2–1	3–0	3–0		3–1	4–0
Selangor	2–0	7–0	7–1	1–1		14–0
Young Tigress	1–2	1–1	1–3	0–6	0–9	

Updated to match(es) played on 17 Oct 2026. Source: FAM-CMS
Legend: Blue = home team win; Yellow = draw; Red = away team win.
For upcoming matches, an "a" indicates there is an article about the rivalry between the two participants.

== Knock-out stage ==
Semifinals
Sabah FA	2
Red Eagles	0
Selangor	1
Kelana United	0

Final
Sabah FA	1
Selangor	0
Third place play-off
Red Eagles	0
Kelana United	2

===== Semi-finals =====
24 October 2026	Sabah FA	2−0	Red Eagles	Subang, Selangor
16:30 UTC+8	Sebin An 45+1'; Enzi Broussard 58'	Report		Stadium: MBSJ Arena

25 October 2026	Selangor	1−0	Kelana United	Subang, Selangor
16:30 UTC+8	Julissa Cisneros 45+2' (pen.)	Report		Stadium: MBSJ Arena

===== Third place play-off =====
1 November 2026	Red Eagles	0−2	Kelana United	Cheras, Kuala Lumpur
16:30 UTC+8		Report	12', 26' Reva Octaviani	Stadium: Kuala Lumpur Stadium

===== Final =====
1 November 2026	Sabah FA	1−0	Selangor	Cheras, Kuala Lumpur
20:45 UTC+8	Enzi Broussard 89'	Report		Stadium: Kuala Lumpur Stadium

== Season statistics ==
=== Top goalscorers ===
As of 1 Nov 2026

Rank	Player	Team	Goals
1	(Mexico) Julissa Cisneros	Selangor	20
2	(United States) Enzi Broussard	Sabah FA	9
3	(Indonesia) Reva Octaviani	Kelana United	7
3	(Malaysia) Ainsyah Murad	Selangor	7
3	(Japan) Sakura Yoshida	Selangor	7
6	(United States) Mai-Lisa Atis	Sabah FA	6
6	(Malaysia) Kaseh Carlmila Az Zahra	Selangor	6
6	(South Korea) Yeo Min-ji	Selangor	6
9	(Brazil) Geovana Cardoso Da Silva	Kelana United	5
9	(Malaysia) Nur Jue Khaleesya	Kuala Lumpur FA	5
11	(Nepal) Nisha Thokar	Red Eagles	4

=== Hat-tricks ===
As of 15 Sep 2026

Player	For	Against	Result	Date
(Mexico) Julissa Cisneros ^{4}	Selangor	Red Eagles	7–1 (H)	14 June 2026
(South Korea) Yeo Min-ji	Selangor	Young Tigress	0–9 (A)	21 June 2026
(Japan) Sakura Yoshida	Selangor	Young Tigress	14–0 (H)	6 Sep 2026
(Mexico) Julissa Cisneros (2) ^{5}	Selangor	Young Tigress	14–0 (H)	6 Sep 2026
(Malaysia) Nur Ainsyah Murad	Selangor	Young Tigress	14–0 (H)	6 Sep 2026
(United States) Enzi Broussard ^{4}	Sabah FA	Young Tigress	0–6 (A)	15 Sep 2026

Notes

^{4} Player scored 4 goals
^{5} Player scored 5 goals
(H) – Home team
(A) – Away team
