= Kuala Lumpur FA Women's football team =

Malaysian women's association football club

Kuala Lumpur FA Women
- Full name: Kuala Lumpur FA women's football team
- Nickname: City Girls
- Short name: KL FA Women
- Founded: 1975; 51 years ago (association); 2022 (senior women's team)
- Ground: Kuala Lumpur Stadium, Cheras, Kuala Lumpur
- Capacity: 18,000
- President: Syed Yazid Bin Syed Omar
- Head coach: Mohamad Hafiz Hairuddin
- League: National Women's League
- 2025: National Women's League, 5th of 8
- Website: Official website
Home colours	Away colours

The Kuala Lumpur FA Women's Football Team (Malay: Pasukan Bola Sepak Wanita Persatuan Bola Sepak Kuala Lumpur) is an official women's football team representing the Kuala Lumpur Football Association club based in Federal Territory of Malaysia of Kuala Lumpur. The team competes in the National Women's League, the top flight of women's football in Malaysia. They play their home games at the MPAJ Stadium.

== History ==
The parent association, Kuala Lumpur Football Association (KLFA), was founded in 1975 to govern football across the Federal Territory. While local grassroots and regional women's amateur leagues like the Kuala Lumpur Women's Super League and partnerships with local initiatives operated independently, an official senior women's representative team under KLFA's direct banner was formally mobilized to enter the national system.

In 2022, KLFA Women made their official senior tier debut in the expanded National Women's League (Malaysia), joining competitive rival clubs like Selangor FC, Sabah FA, and local neighbors KL Rangers FC.

== Stadium ==
The team shares its infrastructure with the men's developmental divisions and utilizes the Kuala Lumpur Stadium, situated in Cheras, Kuala Lumpur, for elite league fixtures and select high-profile home matches.

== Players ==
As of 14 June 2026

Note: Flags indicate national team as defined under FIFA eligibility rules; some limited exceptions apply. Players may hold more than one non-FIFA nationality.

No.	Pos.	Nation	Player
1	GK	MAS	Farah Syakira Saad
2	FW	MAS	Farzana Afrina Noridan
3	DF	MAS	Farah Wahida Norlee (captain)
6	DF	MAS	Putri Nurbatrisyia Amani
8	DF	MAS	Nur Syafinaz Razak
12	FW	MAS	Azza Harniza Basharudin
13	DF	MAS	Nurin Batrisyia Efendy
14	FW	MAS	Putri Nurul Asyiqin
15	MF	MAS	Nurul Nuha Sharipuddin
16	MF	JPN	Risa Kawai

No.	Pos.	Nation	Player
17	FW	MAS	Jue Khaleesya Husni
18	MF	MAS	Zarith Sofea Nor Azri
19	MF	JPN	Mayu Konno
20	GK	MAS	Rozaini Bakar
21	FW	MAS	Nurul Nadia Roslan
22	FW	MAS	Nasuha Nasha Mazli
23	DF	MAS	Yusrina Syasya Yusmar
24	FW	MAS	Nur Qistina Zulkafli
25	GK	MAS	Nur Ally Syahana Rasidin

== Coaching staff ==
As of 14 June 2026

Position	Staff
Team manager	(Malaysia) Nor Asyiqin binti Jaafar
Head coach	(Malaysia) Mohamad Hafiz Hairuddin
Assistant head coach	(Malaysia) Farah Dhiba binti Abd Aziz
Goalkeeper coach	(Malaysia) Mohd Zaki Bin Maarof
Fitness coach	(Malaysia) Syafiqa Irisya Bt Shazimy
Team officials	(Malaysia) Nur Atiqah Najihah Binti Hairudi
Team admin	(Malaysia) Aidil Afiqah Binti Nor Azha
Team doctor	(Malaysia) Isabelle Wong
Kitman	(Malaysia) Ahmad Ridhwan Bin Kamaludin

== Season by season record ==
Season	Division	Position	Piala Tun Sharifah Rodziah	AFC Women's Champions League	Top scorer (all competitions)
2022	National Women's League	Third place (Central Zone)	DNQ	Not held	Unknown
2025	National Women's League	5th of 8	Not held	DNQ	(Malaysia) Nur Laila Syamila Binti A Rahim (10)
2026	National Women's League	TBD	Not held	DNQ	TBD

== Honours ==
=== League ===
- National Women's League
  - Third place (1): 2022 (Central Zone)

=== Cup ===
- Piala Tun Sharifah Rodziah
  - Runners-up (4): 1995, 1996, 1997 & 1999
