= Faizah Saidin =

Malaysian footballer

Personal information
- Full name: Siti Nurfaizah binti Saidin
- Date of birth: 1 April 2002 (age 24)
- Place of birth: Tambunan, Sabah, Malaysia
- Height: 1.56 m (5 ft 1 1/2 in)
- Position: Defender

Senior career*
Years	Team	Apps	(Gls)
2015	Sabah		
2022	Melaka United	5	(0)
2023	Malaysia University	9	(0)
2024	Selangor	7	(0)
2024–	Sabah	13	(1)

International career^{‡}
2021–	Malaysia	18	(0)
- * Club domestic league appearances and goals ‡ National team caps and goals as of 22 June 2025

Siti Nurfaizah binti Saidin (born 1 April 2002) is a Malaysian women's footballer who plays as a defender for Malaysia National Women's League club Sabah FA.

== Club career ==
At the age of 13, Faizah played for Sabah women's team in the 2015 Piala Tun Sharifah Rodziah, wearing the number 15 kit. In 2022, she played for Melaka United and won the 2022 Piala Tun Sharifah Rodziah. In 2023, while studying at Universiti Pertahanan Nasional Malaysia, she play and captained the Malaysia University football team that finish third in the Malaysia National Women's League. In 2024 she signed with Sabah from Selangor and featured in 5 matches of the 2024–25 AFC Women's Champions League.

== International career ==
Faizah has represent Malaysia women's team at underage level. In September 2021, she received her first senior callup for 2022 AFC Women's Asian Cup qualification and made her debut against Thailand.

== Career statistics ==
=== International ===
Appearances and goals by national team and year
National team	Year	Apps	Goals
Malaysia	2021	2	0
Malaysia	2022	3	0
Malaysia	2023	7	0
Malaysia	2024	4	0
Malaysia	2025	2	0
Total		18	0
