= Malaysia National Women's League =

Malaysia National Women's League Liga Wanita Nasional
- Organising body: Football Association of Malaysia (FAM)
- Founded: 2022; 4 years ago
- Country: Malaysia
- Confederation: AFC
- Number of clubs: 8
- Level on pyramid: 1
- Domestic cup: Piala Tun Sharifah Rodziah
- International cup: AFC Women's Champions League
- Current champions: Sabah FA (3rd titles)
- Most championships: Sabah FA(3 titles)
- Broadcaster: Astro Arena (selected matches)
- Current: 2026 Malaysia National Women's League

Malaysia National Women's League (Malay: Liga Wanita Nasional) is a women's football league in Malaysia. Since its establishment in 2022, it is jointly run by the Football Association of Malaysia and the Ministry of Youth and Sports.

== History ==
A women's football competition has been held in Malaysia since 1960. The inaugural season was competed by four teams from Perak, Selangor, Negeri Sembilan and Malacca. A competition trophy was introduced in 1961. Women Football Association of Malaysia (PBWM) was officially registered in December 1974, and the first president was Tun Sharifah Rodziah.

== Competition format ==
Since 2023 there were 6 teams in single league. Each played the others twice for a total of 10 games. In 2023, the format for the new club competition called the AFC Women's Champions League was unveiled. Starting with the 2024–25 edition, Sabah FA became the first representative club from Malaysia.

== Teams ==
A total of 13 teams have played in the National Women's League from its inception.

=== Current teams ===
| Team | Previous position | First season | Number of seasons | Titles | Last title |
|---|---|---|---|---|---|
| Kelana United | 4th | 2023 | 4 | 1 | 2024 |
| Kuala Lumpur FA | 5th | 2025 | 2 | 0 | —N/a |
| Red Eagles | 8th | 2024 | 3 | 0 | —N/a |
| Sabah FA | Champions | 2023 | 4 | 2 | 2025 |
| Selangor | Runners-up | 2023 | 4 | 0 | —N/a |
| Young Tigress | 7th | 2025 | 2 | 0 | —N/a |

== Former teams ==
Former teams of National Women's League
| Team | Joined | Final season | Best finish |
|---|---|---|---|
| (Perak) LMS Tigress F.C. | 2022 | 2023 | 3rd (2022) |
| (Malaysia) Malaysian University | 2023 | 2024 | 3rd (2023) |
| SSM Pahang | 2022 | 2024 | Champions (Central Zone 2022) |
| (Malacca) Melaka FA | 2022 | 2024 | Runners-up (South Zone 2022) |
| (Penang) Real CJ | 2024 | 2024 | 8th (2024) |
| (Kuala Lumpur) KL Rangers | 2025 | 2025 | 6th (2025) |
| (Selangor) MBSJ | 2025 | 2025 | 3rd (2025) |

== Winners, runners-up and third places ==
| Year | Winners | | Result | Runners–up | Third place |
|---|---|---|---|---|---|
| 2022 | (North Zone) | Penang FA | —N/a | Kelantan FA | (Perak) LMS Tigress F.C. |
| 2022 | (Central Zone) | SSM Pahang | —N/a | Selangor | Kuala Lumpur FA |
| 2022 | (South Zone) | (Negeri Sembilan) N.Sembilan FA | —N/a | (Malacca) Melaka FA | (Malaysia) PDRM FA |
| 2022 | (Sarawak Zone) | (Sarawak) Kuching FA | 3–1 | (Sarawak) Samarahan FA | (Sarawak) Sibu FA |
| 2022 | (Sabah Zone) | (Sabah) Zon Pantai Barat (A) | 5–0 | (Sabah) Zon Pantai Barat Selatan | (Sabah) Zon Pantai Barat (B) (Sabah) Zon Pedalaman Atas (B) |
League match format
| 2023 | Sabah FA | | | (Selangor) Kelana United | (Malaysia) Malaysian University |
| 2024 | (Selangor) Kelana United | | | Sabah FA | Selangor |
| 2025 | Sabah FA | | | Selangor | (Selangor) MBSJ |
| Year | Winners | | Result | Runners–up | Third place |
| 2026 | Sabah FA | | 1–0 | Selangor | (Selangor) Kelana United |

== Titles by team (2023–present) ==
| Team | Titles | Winning seasons |
|---|---|---|
| Sabah FA | 3 | 2023, 2025, 2026 |
| (Selangor) Kelana United | 1 | 2024 |

== Performance by team (2023–present) ==
| Team | Winners | Runners-up |
|---|---|---|
| Sabah FA | 3 (2023,2025,2026) | 1 (2024) |
| (Selangor) Kelana United | 1 (2024) | 1 (2023) |
| Selangor | —N/a | 2 (2025,2026) |

== Awards ==
=== Prize money ===
The 2026 season, the distribution of the prize money is as follows.

- Winner: RM 60,000
- Runner-up: RM 40,000
- Third place: RM 20,000
- Top scorer: RM 3,000
- Best player: RM 2,000
- Best goal keeper: RM 2,000
- Best young player: RM 2,000

=== Golden boot winners ===
| Season | Player | Team | Goals |
|---|---|---|---|
| 2023 | (Malaysia) Kaseh Carlmila Az Zahra | SSM Pahang | 6 |
| 2024 | (Malaysia) Intan Sarah (Malaysia) Siti Nur Khaleeda Ismail | Kelana United Malaysian University | 18 |
| 2025 | (Myanmar) Win Theingi Tun | Sabah FA | 25 |
| 2026 | (Mexico) Julissa Cisneros | Selangor | 20 |

=== Best player ===
| Season | Player | Team |
|---|---|---|
| 2023 | (Malaysia) Usliza Usman | Sabah FA |
| 2024 | (Malaysia) Nur Ainsyah Murad | Selangor |
| 2025 | (Malaysia) Nur Ainsyah Murad | Selangor |
| 2026 | (South Korea) Sebin An | Sabah FA |

=== Best player of match (final) ===
| Season | Player | Club |
|---|---|---|
| 2023 | Not awarded | Not awarded |
| 2024 | Not awarded | Not awarded |
| 2025 | Not awarded | Not awarded |
| 2026 | (United States) Enzi Broussard | Sabah FA |

=== Best goalkeeper ===
| Season | Player | Team |
|---|---|---|
| 2023 | (Malaysia) Asma Junaidi | Sabah FA |
| 2024 | (Malaysia) Zawani Nisha | Kelana United |
| 2025 | (Malaysia) Azurin Mazlan | Sabah FA |
| 2026 | (Malaysia) Asma Junaidi | Sabah FA |

=== Best young player ===
| Season | Player | Team |
|---|---|---|
| 2023 | (Malaysia) Nur Najwa Irdina | SSM Pahang |
| 2024 | (Malaysia) Dhiyaa Addin | Kelana United |
| 2025 | (Malaysia) Dian Aqilah | MBSJ |
| 2026 | (Malaysia) Qaseh Riana Dafira | Young Tigress |

=== Best Coach Award ===
| Season | Player | Team |
|---|---|---|
| 2023 | (Malaysia) Justin Ganai | Sabah FA |
| 2024 | (Malaysia) Mohd Fairuz Mohd Noor | Kelana United |
| 2025 | (Malaysia) Bobby Gonzales | Sabah FA |
| 2026 | (Malaysia) Bobby Gonzales | Sabah FA |

=== Fairplay Award ===
| Season | Team |
|---|---|
| 2023 | —N/a |
| 2024 | —N/a |
| 2025 | (Malaysia) Young Tigress (Kuala Lumpur) KL Rangers |
| 2026 | (Selangor) Kelana United |
