= Red Eagles S.C. =

Malaysian women's association football club

Red Eagles Soccer Club
- Full name: Red Eagles Soccer Club Women
- Short name: RESC
- Founded: 2016; 10 years ago
- Ground: MPKP Mini Stadium
- Capacity: 5,000
- President: Irwan Rashidi
- Head coach: Mohd Firdaus Azid
- League: National Women's League
- 2024: NWL, 6th of 8

Red Eagles SC Women is a Malaysian professional women's football club based in Jitra, Kedah. Established in 2016 as a grassroots initiative, the club was officially registered in 2021. Red Eagles SC currently compete in the Liga Wanita Nasional (LWN), Malaysia's national women's league, and is known for its consistent contribution to the development of women's football in the northern region of Malaysia.

== History ==
Red Eagles Soccer Club was founded in 2016 with the mission of providing a platform for young female footballers in Kedah to develop their skills and compete at higher levels. The club was initiated by Irwan Rashidi who also serves as its president. Initially operating without affiliation to any state football association, Red Eagles SC began participating in local leagues and invitational tournaments.

In 2021, the club expanded its operations to include youth development programs and squads for national-level tournaments. Despite absence of direct backing from the state football association, Red Eagles SC has sustained its growth through community support and grassroots participation. In December 2021 the club won the 4-Penjuru Invitational Tournament, scoring seven goals across four matches, with Haniza Shaarani emerging as the tournament's top scorer. The club has also claimed success in previous editions of the Liga Bolasepak Rakyat Wanita (LBRW) and the Piala Tun Sharifah Rodziah (PTSR), securing a championship title in 2018 and finishing as runners-up in 2019.

=== National League Participation ===
In the 2024, Red Eagles SC was among the eight founding teams. The club continued to compete in the 2025 LWN season, with home matches hosted at the MPKP Mini Stadium in Jitra.

== Players ==
=== Current squad ===
As of 21 June 2026

Note: Flags indicate national team as defined under FIFA eligibility rules; some limited exceptions apply. Players may hold more than one non-FIFA nationality.

No.	Pos.	Nation	Player
1	GK	MAS	Zara Syazwin Nazrol
2	DF	MAS	Nur Husnina Uzma
3	MF	MAS	Munirah Abdullah
4	DF	MAS	Nur Qaseh Irdina
5	DF	MAS	Nur Airis Hana
6	DF	MAS	Asma Qusna Md Isa
7	DF	MAS	Putri Zarra Arissa
8	MF	MAS	Nur Damia Qistina
9	FW	MAS	Nurul Izzati Zainol (captain)
10	MF	MAS	Intan Nurzulaikha
11	MF	MAS	Asyiqin Zulaikha Ridzuan
12	DF	MAS	Nur Alisha Izzani
13	MF	MAS	Chancira Som Bak
14	MF	MAS	Dayang Aleesya Saffiyah

No.	Pos.	Nation	Player
15	DF	MAS	Nurul Husna
16	MF	MAS	Suphatsara Chirasark
17	DF	MAS	Nur Fathiah Izzayani
18	GK	MAS	Siti Zulaikha Bashah
19	MF	MAS	Nur Qaisara Inarah
20	FW	MAS	Aufa Airish Hafidzan
21	MF	MAS	Nur Aisya Sofea
22	GK	MAS	Nur Farhana Nabila
23	DF	MAS	Nur Anisya Aqilah
25	GK	MAS	Nur Syarafina Zamri
26	DF	NEP	Hira Kumari Bhujel
27	DF	NEP	Nisha Thokar
28	MF	NEP	Anita Basnet
30	FW	MAS	Ainur Marziah Saad

== Management ==
=== Coaching staff ===
As of 21 June 2026

Position	Staff
Team manager	(Malaysia) Dato’ Kang Hsuen Chiang
Assistant manager	(Malaysia) Norsahili Ahmad
Head coach	(Malaysia) Mohd Firdaus Azid
Assistant coach	(Malaysia) Mohd Irwan Rashidi (Malaysia) Mira Fazliana Aidi
Goalkeeper coach	(Malaysia) Mohd Farid Baharum
Physiotherapist	(Malaysia) Khairul Azhar Che Ros
Team admin	(Malaysia) Muhamad Hafizie Noraziz
Team security	(Malaysia) Ahmad Norman Hat
Masseur	(Malaysia) Mohd Syamir Sallehudin
Kitman	(Malaysia) Mohd Saiful Rashidi Ngoh (Malaysia) Mohd Nasrul Baddaruldin (Malaysia) Nazrul Naim Mohd Noor

== Season by season record ==
Season	Division	Position	Piala Tun Sharifah Rodziah	AFC Women's Champions League	Top scorer (all competitions)
2024	National Women's League	6th place	Not held	DNQ	(Malaysia) Muskan Abdul Majid (3)
2025	National Women's League	8th place	Not held	DNQ	(Malaysia) Nornabilah Mohd Asmadi (3)
2026	National Women's League	TBD	TBD	DNQ	
