= Young Tigress =

Malaysian women's association football club

- Founded: 2025; 1 year ago
- Ground: PKNS Sports Complex
- Capacity: 1,000
- Head coach: Nidzam Adzha
- League: National Women's League
- 2026: TBD
- Website: Young Tigress

Young Tigress Football Club is a Malaysian professional women's football team based in Kelana Jaya, Selangor. The club was established in 2025 and currently competes in the National Women's League, the top division of women's football in Malaysia. It serves as a developmental team affiliated with the national women’s football structure overseen by the Football Association of Malaysia (FAM).

== History ==
Young Tigress was one of four new teams introduced in the 2025 season of the Liga Wanita Nasional, alongside KL Rangers, Kuala Lumpur FA, and MBSJ FC. The club was created with a vision to develop promising young female footballers in Malaysia and provide a pathway to the national team, commonly known as the Malayan Tigress. The club plays its home matches at the PKNS Sports Complex in Kelana Jaya.

== Development role ==
Young Tigress functions as a key feeder team for the national youth squads and the senior women’s team. The team is closely linked with national development programs such as the Liga Puteri-FAM, an under-16 youth competition for girls. The club emphasizes technical training, competitive exposure, and leadership grooming among Malaysia’s emerging female footballers.

== 2025 season ==
The 2025 Malaysia National Women's League season marks Young Tigress' debut in senior women’s football. The season kicked off on 12 July 2025 with eight teams competing in a double round-robin format. While full match results and player stats for Young Tigress are not yet widely reported, the club is expected to play a major role in shaping future national team talents.

== Home ground ==
Young Tigress play their home matches at PKNS Sports Complex in Kelana Jaya, Selangor.

== Players ==
=== Current squad ===
As of 25 June 2026

Note: Flags indicate national team as defined under FIFA eligibility rules; some limited exceptions apply. Players may hold more than one non-FIFA nationality.

No.	Pos.	Nation	Player
1	GK	MAS	Putri Aina Husna
2	DF	MAS	Nur Ummairah Soberi
3	DF	MAS	Nur Dania Batrisya
4	MF	MAS	Amesha Danya Gabriel
5	FW	MAS	Iris Damya Sharizan
7	MF	MAS	Putri Mia Alysa
8	MF	MAS	Nurhani Humairah
9	MF	MAS	Keisha Adeliena
11	MF	MAS	Nur Aliya Ellys’sha
13	MF	MAS	Afrina Azhar
15	FW	MAS	Az Zahra Azhar

No.	Pos.	Nation	Player
16	GK	MAS	Nour Rashidah Adr Ermanty
17	MF	MAS	Nur Awadah Awfiyah
18	MF	MAS	Zaleysha Yasmin
19	MF	MAS	Shadrina Ahmad Johari (captain)
21	MF	BEL	Nasha Nur Aini
23	GK	MAS	Irdina Qaisara
24	FW	MAS	Qaseh Riana Dafira
25	FW	MAS	Fatin Shahida Azmi
26	MF	MAS	Nur Aleeya Nazira
31	FW	MAS	Alisyah Qaisara
32	FW	MAS	Isabella Saffiya

== Management ==
=== Coaching staff ===
As of 25 June 2026

Position	Staff
Team Manager	(Brazil) Joel Cornelli
Assistant team Manager	(Malaysia) Shahira Aqilah Shamsul Hazli
Head coach	(Malaysia) Nidzam Adzha
Assistant head coach	(Malaysia) Leila Chua Pak Ling
Assistant coach	(Malaysia) Daphney Teoh
Goalkeeper coach	(Malaysia) Sofian Hamzah Abdul Gani
Physiotherapist	(Malaysia) Shohaili Mansor (Malaysia) Mohamad Harris Zafran
Team coach	(Malaysia) Ahmad Izzuddin bin Adnan (Malaysia) Ismail bin Khalid
Kitman	(Malaysia) Amirul bin Husin (Malaysia) Abang Mohamad Abang Usop

== See also ==
- Liga Wanita Nasional
- Malaysia women's national football team
- Liga Puteri-FAM
