= Sabah FA (women) =

Malaysian women's association football club

Sabah FA Women
- Full name: Sabah Football Association Women's Team
- Nickname: The Rhinos
- Ground: Likas Stadium
- Capacity: 35,000
- President: YB Datuk Ir. Shahelmey Yahya
- Head coach: Bobby Gonzales
- League: National Women's League
- 2026: NWL, Champions
Home colours	Away colours

Sabah FA Women is a Malaysian women's professional football club affiliated with the Sabah Football Association (SAFA), based in Kota Kinabalu, Sabah, Malaysia. The team competes in the Malaysia National Women's League and has represented Malaysia in the AFC Women's Champions League.

== History ==
The Sabah FA Women's team has long been one of the strongest sides in Malaysian women's football. The team achieved notable domestic milestones. In 2023, Sabah emerged as the inaugural champion of the National Women's League, edging out Kelana United on goal difference. The league's best player award was won by Usliza Usman, while Asma Junaidi was named best goalkeeper. At the 2024 Sukma Games (SUKMA XXI), Sabah qualified for the final after a commanding 6–0 victory over the Federal Territories team in the semi-final.

== AFC Women's Champions League ==
In the preliminary round they drew 1–1 with Nepal’s APF FC and defeated Uzbekistan’s PFC Nasaf 2–1 to top group C. The team’s success was spearheaded by key players such as Myanmar international Win Theingi Tun, who scored both goals against Nasaf, and goalkeeper Nurul Azurin Mazlan, whose performance was instrumental throughout the qualification stage. In the AWCL group stage held in Wuhan, China, Sabah faced Hyundai Steel Red Angels (South Korea), Wuhan Jiangda, and Abu Dhabi Country Club (United Arab Emirates). Despite losing the first two matches, Sabah managed a 2–2 draw against Abu Dhabi CC, earning their first point in the continental competition.

== Home ground ==
Sabah FA Women plays its home matches at Likas Stadium in Kota Kinabalu. The stadium has a capacity of 35,000 and was last renovated in 2023.

== Players ==
=== Current squad ===
As of 15 June 2026

Note: Flags indicate national team as defined under FIFA eligibility rules; some limited exceptions apply. Players may hold more than one non-FIFA nationality.

No.	Pos.	Nation	Player
1	GK	MAS	Ezza Ashikin Razak
3	FW	MAS	Fleyvianniezie Ishak
4	DF	MAS	Chrisarellysa Richard
5	DF	MAS	Steffi Sarge Kaur
6	MF	MAS	Rocillyeka Lole
7	MF	MAS	Jaciah Jumilis (captain)
8	MF	JPN	Ayuri Terawaki
9	MF	MAS	Usliza Usman
10	MF	MAS	Haindee Mosroh
11	DF	MAS	Rosdianah Adeline Jerus
13	MF	MAS	Nurhalizah Ahmad
14	DF	MAS	Juliana Barek
15	DF	MAS	Faizah Saidin
16	DF	MAS	Arecha Pansie Efandi

No.	Pos.	Nation	Player
17	DF	MAS	Ainie Tulis
18	DF	MAS	Jessica Susanne Mailu
19	MF	KOR	Sebin An
20	FW	USA	Delainey Varela-Keen
21	DF	MAS	Adrienna Zamzaihir
22	MF	USA	Mai-Lisa Atis
23	FW	MAS	Siti Nursasha Ain
24	MF	MAS	Hallyvianna Joseph
25	FW	MAS	Azzlyeanieh Kinuli
26	MF	MAS	Dian Aqilah Mohamed Imran
27	MF	MAS	Farahiyah Ridzuan
28	FW	MAS	Jafnizah Yan Rosle
29	MF	MAS	Delvira Dabbie Mailu
30	GK	MAS	Nurul Azurin Mazlan
50	GK	MAS	Asma Junaidi

== Management & coaching staff ==
=== Team officials ===
As of 25 October 2025

Position	Name
Team Manager	(Malaysia) Muhd Arziz Afizy Rumsani
Assistant manager	(Malaysia) Gosutim Ganai (Malaysia) Djoehan Darno
Head coach	(Malaysia) Bobby Gonzales
Asst. head Coach	(Malaysia) Petronella Douny
Asst. Coach	(Malaysia) Hilary John Baptist
Goalkeeper coach	(Malaysia) Jasrih Jabidin
Asst. goalkeeper coach	(Malaysia) Afizan Paka
Fitness coach	(Malaysia) Zaryatie Zakaria
Physiotherapist	(Malaysia) Colypopo Monggiok
Team admin	(Malaysia) Mary Elizabeth Popong
Team media	(Malaysia) Omardee Nain
Kitman	(Malaysia) Marcia Munchin

== Season by season record ==
Season	Division	Position	Piala Tun Sharifah Rodziah	AFC Women's Champions League	Top scorer (all competitions)
2023	National Women's League	Champions	Not held	Not held	(Malaysia) Azzlyeanieh Kinuli (4) (Malaysia) Usliza Usman (4)
2024	National Women's League	Runner-up	Not held	Group stage	(Malaysia) Azzlyeanieh Kinuli (15)
2025	National Women's League	Champions	Not held	DNQ	(Myanmar) Win Theingi Tun (25)
2026	National Women's League	Champions	Not held	Preliminary stage	(United States) Enzi Broussard (9)

== Continental record ==
Season	Competition	Round	Opponent	Home	Away	Aggregate
2024–25	AFC Champions League	Preliminary stage	(Nepal) APF	0–0		1st
2024–25	AFC Champions League	Preliminary stage	(Uzbekistan) Nasaf	2–1		1st
2024–25	AFC Champions League	Group stage	(South Korea) Incheon Red Angels	0–3		4th
2024–25	AFC Champions League	Group stage	(China) Wuhan Jianghan	0–7		4th
2024–25	AFC Champions League	Group stage	(United Arab Emirates) Abu Dhabi Country Club	2–2		4th
2026–27	AFC Champions League	Preliminary stage	(Guam) Rovers FC	13–0		2nd
2026–27	AFC Champions League	Preliminary stage	(Bangladesh) Rajshahi Stars	2–1		2nd
2026–27	AFC Champions League	Preliminary stage	(India) East Bengal	0–2		2nd

== Honours ==
=== League ===
- National Women's League
  - Champions (3): 2023, 2025, 2026
  - Runners-up (1): 2024

=== Cup ===
- Piala Tun Sharifah Rodziah
  - Champions (11): 1988,1991,1992,1993,1994,1995,1996,1997,1998,2003 & 2004
  - Runners-up (4): 2000,2002, 2015 & 2016

=== Regional ===
- Malaysia Games (SUKMA)
  - Finalist: 2024

== Notable players ==
Malaysia

- Usliza Usman
- Asma Junaidi
- Nurul Azurin Mazlan

AFC

- Win Theingi Tun (Myanmar)

== See also ==
- Sabah F.C. (Malaysia)
- Malaysia women's national football team
- AFC Women's Champions League
