= Nurul Azurin Mazlan =

Malaysian footballer (born 2000)

Nurul Azurin
Personal information
- Date of birth: 27 January 2000 (age 26)
- Place of birth: Klang, Malaysia
- Position: Goalkeeper

Team information
- Current team: Sabah FA
- Number: 30

Youth career
- 2012–2014: MBSA

Senior career*
| Years | Team | Apps | (Gls) |
| 2019–2020 | Melaka United | 5 | (0) |
| 2021–2022 | Misaka United | 8 | (0) |
| 2023 | UPNM | 3 | (0) |
| 2023 | Misaka United | 7 | (0) |
| 2023 | KFF Presingu | 11 | (0) |
| 2024 | Sabah FA | 15 | (0) |
| 2025 | KFF Vllaznia | 4 | (0) |
| 2025– | Sabah FA | 0 | (0) |

International career
| 2012 | Malaysia U12 | 0 | (0) |
| 2014 | Malaysia U14 | 0 | (0) |
| 2016 | Malaysia U19 | 2 | (0) |
| 2017– | Malaysia | 41 | (0) |
- * Club domestic league appearances and goals

Nurul Azurin Mazlan (born 27 January 2000) is a Malaysian women's footballer who plays as a goalkeeper for Malaysia National Women's League club Sabah FA.

== Early life and education ==
She started playing football at the age of ten. She attended Sabah Malaysia Sports School in Malaysia.

== Youth career ==
Azurin's career began when he played for the Shah Alam City Council club under coach Anuar Abu Bakar. In 2014, MBSA participated in the 1MCC Under-14 Championship and became champions in the tournament.

== Club career ==
She was awarded 2015 and 2018 Malaysia Women's Player of the Year. She played for Indian side Misaka United, where she was regarded as one of the club's important players.

== International career ==
Azurin was included in the Malaysia squad for 2017 SEA Games. She has been described as "expected to play key roles" for the Malaysia women's national football team.

== Style of play ==
She has been described as "reads the game well and is steady".

== Personal life ==
She is a native of Shah Alam, Malaysia.

== Honours ==
=== Club ===
Melaka United

- Piala Tun Sharifah Rodziah: 2019

Misaka United

- Karnataka Women's League runner up: 2021-2022

Sabah

- Malaysia National Women's League runner up: 2024
- AFC Women's Champions League Group Stage: 2024-2025

KFF Vllanzia

- Kategoria Superiore Femra: 2024-2025

=== International ===
Malaysia

- SAFF Women's International Friendly Tournament 3rd: 2023

=== Individual ===
- FAM Football Awards – Best Women Footballer: 2015, 2018
- Karnataka Women's League – Best Goalkeeper: 2021
- SAFF Women's International Friendly Tournament – Best Goalkeeper: 2023
