= 2023 Malaysia National Women's League =

National Women's League
- Season: 2023
- Dates: 5 August – 4 November
- Champions: Sabah FA
- AFC Champions League: Sabah FA
- Top goalscorer: 6 goals Kaseh Carlmila Az Zahra
- Biggest home win: Sabah 4–0 Selangor (29 Oct 2023)
- Biggest away win: Selangor 0–5 SSM Pahang (04 Nov 2023)

The 2023 Malaysia National Women's League (Malay: Liga Wanita Nasional 2023) was the second edition of the National Women's League. It is run by Football Association of Malaysia together with the Ministry of Youth and Sports and features 6 teams.

== Teams ==
Team	Location	Stadium
(Selangor) Kelana United	Subang Jaya	Arena MBSJ
(Perak) LMS Tigress F.C.	Bangi	UNITEN Mini Stadium
(Malaysia) Malaysian University	Shah Alam	UiTM Stadium
Sabah FA	Kota Kinabalu	UMS Mini Stadium
Selangor	Subang Jaya	Arena MBSJ
SSM Pahang	Gambang	SSMP Mini Stadium

== Standings ==
=== League table ===
Pos	Team	Pld	W	D	L	GF	GA	GD	Pts	Qualification or relegation
1	Sabah FA (C, P)	8	3	4	1	12	4	+8	13	Qualification for 2024–25 AFC Women's Champions League
2	Kelana United	8	4	1	3	10	11	−1	13	
3	Malaysian University	8	3	3	2	10	6	+4	12	
4	SSM Pahang	8	3	2	3	11	10	+1	11	
5	Selangor	8	1	2	5	3	15	−12	5	
6	LMS Tigress F.C.	0	0	0	0	0	0	0	0	Withdrew

Updated to match(es) played on 04 Nov 2023. Source: FAM-CMS
Rules for classification: 1) Points; 2) Goal difference; 3) Number of goals scored.
(C) League Champion; (P) Promotion to AFC Women's Champions League

== Season statistics ==
=== Top goalscorers ===
As of 4 November 2023

Rank	Player	Team	Goals
1	(Malaysia) Kaseh Carlmila Az Zahra	SSM Pahang	6
2	(Malaysia) Henrietta Justine	Kelana United	4
2	(Malaysia) Adrienna Zamzaihiri	Malaysian University	4
2	(Malaysia) Azzlyeanieh Kinuli	Sabah FA	4
2	(Malaysia) Usliza Binti Usman	Sabah FA	4
6	(Malaysia) Nur Ainsyah Murad	Kelana United	3
6	(Malaysia) Nur Fazira Muhammad Sani	Malaysian University	3
