= Kelana United FC (women) =

Malaysian women's association football club

Kelana United Women
- Full name: Kelana United Football Club Women
- Short name: KUFC
- Founded: 2019; 7 years ago
- Ground: Arena MBSJ
- Capacity: 1,000
- President: Datuk Rosal Azimin Ahmad
- Head coach: Fairuz Montana Zainal Abidin
- League: National Women's League; FAS Women's Super League
- 2026: NWL, 3rd place
Home colours	Away colours

Kelana United Football Club Women is a Malaysian professional women's football club based in Kelana Jaya, Selangor. They compete in the National Women's League, the top flight of women's football in Malaysia, and the FAS Women's Super League. They play their home games at the Arena MBSJ, and selected games at MPAJ Stadium and Sime Darby Training Ground.

== History ==
Founded as women's section of Kelana United, they first competed in the FAS Women's Super League (FASWSL). In the 2023 Malaysia National Women's League, they finished as runners-up. The team dominated the 2024 season, clinching the NWL title with a record of 12 wins, 1 draw and 1 loss. They scored 58 goals and conceded 5, an achievement that secured their place in the 2025–26 AFC Women's Champions League preliminary round.

Kelana United Women then played their preliminary match being drawn against Jordanian club Etihad, Singaporean club Lion City Sailors and Kyrgyz club Sdyushor SI–Asiagoal in Group C where the group stage preliminary fixtures is played at Hang Jebat Stadium in Melaka.

== Youth and development teams ==
Kelana United under-16 girls' team won the inaugural Liga Puteri-FAM, overcoming SSS Leopard FC. In March 2025, they defeated the same rivals to maintain their status as one of the strongest domestic youth setups.

== Players ==
=== Current squad ===
As of 14 June 2026

Note: Flags indicate national team as defined under FIFA eligibility rules; some limited exceptions apply. Players may hold more than one non-FIFA nationality.

No.	Pos.	Nation	Player
4	FW	MAS	Waitie Taming
5	MF	MAS	Nur Lyana (captain)
6	MF	MAS	Iv Alleysheila Jemin
7	MF	MAS	Siti Nabila Jamin
8	MF	IDN	Reva Octaviani
9	DF	MAS	Nur Faiqah Safira
10	MF	PAK	Maria Khan
11	FW	BRA	Geovana Cardoso
12	DF	MAS	Ainin Sofiya Hasnizam
13	FW	MAS	Nurfazira Muhamad Sani
14	MF	MAS	Siti Nurkhaleeda Ismail
16	GK	MAS	Nur Amerah Ahmad Raihan
17	DF	IDN	Vivi Oktavia

No.	Pos.	Nation	Player
18	DF	MAS	Fatin Najiha Zuber
20	DF	MAS	Nur Dhiyaa Addin
22	GK	MAS	Mitchelle Olivia Thaddeus
23	DF	MAS	Norshahira Suhaime
24	MF	MAS	Thurgasini A/P Kasivishva Nathan
25	FW	MAS	Ain Nur Qaseh Azman
26	DF	MAS	Nur Qistina Tijani
27	MF	MAS	Syafiqah Zainal Abidin
28	FW	MAS	Puteri Noralisa Wilkinson
29	DF	MAS	Nur Fatihah Anum
31	GK	MAS	Nuralyaa Natasha Zulkefli
37	GK	MAS	Zawani Nisha Habib Rahman

== Management ==
=== Coaching staff ===
As of 25 October 2025

Position	Staff
Team manager	(Malaysia) Mustafa Kamil Ibrahim
Assistant manager	(Malaysia) Muhd Azlan Abd Alim
Head coach	(Malaysia) Fairuz Montana Zainal Abidin
Assistant head coach	(Malaysia) Nur Fatin Harun
Goalkeeper coach	(Malaysia) Mohamad Fahmi Mohd Isa
Physiotherapist	(Malaysia) Nazeera Md Shaharudin Khan
Fitness coach	(Malaysia) Muhammad Nasrullah Mohd Nasir
Team official	(Malaysia) Ismail Firdaus Khalid
Masseur	(Malaysia) Muhammad Nadzir Mohd Rathi
Kitman	(Malaysia) Mohamad Ashraf Ahmad Hisham

== Season by season record ==
Season	Division	Position	Piala Tun Sharifah Rodziah	AFC Women's Champions League	Top scorer (all competitions)
2023	National Women's League	Runner-up	Not participated	Not held	(Malaysia) Henrietta Justine (4)
2024	National Women's League	Champions	DNQ	Not held	(Malaysia) Intan Sarah (18)
2025	National Women's League	4th place	Not held	Preliminary stage	(Malaysia) Siti Nabila Jamin (12)
2026	National Women's League	3rd place	Not held	DNQ	(Indonesia) Reva Octaviani (7)

== Continental record ==
Season	Competition	Round	Opponent	Home	Away	Aggregate
2025–26	AFC Champions League	Preliminary stage	(Kyrgyzstan) Sdyushor SI–Asiagoal	0–0		4th
2025–26	AFC Champions League	Preliminary stage	(Singapore) Lion City Sailors	1–3		4th
2025–26	AFC Champions League	Preliminary stage	(Jordan) Etihad	0–4		4th

== Honours ==
=== Domestic ===
- Malaysia National Women's League

Winners (1): 2024
Runners-up (1): 2023
Third place (1): 2026

- Liga Puteri-FAM

Winners (1): 2023
