= Intan Sarah =

Malaysian football and futsal player

Personal information
- Full name: Intan Sarah Anisah binti Zulgafli
- Date of birth: 10 July 1999 (age 27)
- Place of birth: Kuala Lumpur, Malaysia
- Height: 1.68 m (5 ft 6 in)
- Positions: Forward; midfielder

Team information
- Current team: MBSJ
- Number: 23

Senior career*
Years	Team	Apps	(Gls)
2021	New York Dutch Lions	4	(1)
2022	Selangor	3	(0)
2023–2024	Kelana United	27	(28)
2024	MBSJ	9	(19)
2024	Sabah	5	(1)
2025–	MBSJ	9	(10)

International career^{‡}
2023–	Malaysia	10	(3)
- * Club domestic league appearances and goals ‡ National team caps and goals as of 22 June 2025

Intan Sarah Anisah binti Zulgafli (born 10 July 1999), known professionally as Intan Sarah, is a Malaysian women's footballer and futsal player who plays as a forward for Malaysia National Women's League club MBSJ.

== Early life ==
Sarah represented Malaysia in the 100m hurdles at the age of 13.

== Club career ==
In 2021, she signed for American side New York Dutch Lions FC, becoming the first Malaysian woman to play in the Women's Premier Soccer League.

In 2023 season, Sarah played as a midfielder for Kelana United, making 7 appearances and scored 2 league goals in the National Women's League. In 2024 season of National Women's League, she played as a forward and recorded a double hattrick twice, once against Real CJ where she scored 6 goals and once against Melaka where she scored 7 goals. She finished as the top scorer of 2024 National Women's League with 18 goals in 13 appearances.

In 2024 FAS Women's Super League, Sarah played for MBSJ. She finished as the top scorer with 19 goals.

In 2024, Sarah joined Sabah and played in the 2024–25 AFC Women's Champions League. She scored her first AFC Women's Champions League goal in the 2–2 draw against Abu Dhabi Country Club.

== International career ==
Sarah made her debut with Malaysia women's football team at the 2023 Southeast Asian Games. She previously represented Malaysia in futsal category at the 2021 Southeast Asian Games in 2022.

== Career statistics ==
=== International ===
Appearances and goals by national team and year
National team	Year	Apps	Goals
Malaysia	2023	7	1
Malaysia	2025	3	2
Total		10	3

=== International goals ===
No.	Date	Venue	Opponent	Score	Result	Competition
1.	9 May 2023	RCAF Old Stadium, Phnom Penh, Cambodia	Myanmar	1–3	1–5	2023 Southeast Asian Games
2.	3 June 2025	Changlimithang Stadium, Thimphu, Bhutan	Bhutan	1–1	3–1	2025 Women's Tri-Nation Cup
3.	22 June 2025	Theyab Awana Stadium, Al Khawaneej, Dubai, UAE	United Arab Emirates	2–1	3–1	Friendly

== Style of play ==
Sarah is known for her acceleration, defending ability and shooting ability. She is also known for her strength and technical ability.

== In popular culture ==
Sarah starred in the Malaysian movie Gol & Gincu. Vol 2.
