= 2025 Women's Tri-Nation Cup =

2025 Women's Tri-Nations Cup
Tournament details
- Host country: Bhutan
- Dates: 29 May–3 June
- Teams: 3 (from 1 confederation)
- Venue(s): 1 (in 1 host city)

Final positions
- Champions: Hong Kong
- Runners-up: Malaysia
- Third place: Bhutan

Tournament statistics
- Matches played: 3
- Goals scored: 7 (2.33 per match)

The 2025 Women's Tri-Nation Cup was a friendly international women's football tournament organized by the Bhutan Football Federation. Hong Kong won the tournament title.

== Participating nations ==
The event was an invitational tournament.

Team	FIFA Ranking
Bhutan (host)	171
Hong Kong	80
Malaysia	102

== Venue ==
All matches were played in a single venue.

Thimphu	2025 Women's Tri-Nation Cup is located in Bhutan
Changlimithang Stadium	2025 Women's Tri-Nation Cup is located in Bhutan
Capacity: 15,000	2025 Women's Tri-Nation Cup is located in Bhutan

== Results ==
Pos	Team	Pld	W	D	L	GF	GA	GD	Pts
1	Hong Kong	2	1	1	0	2	1	+1	4
2	Malaysia	2	1	0	1	4	3	+1	3
3	Bhutan (H)	2	0	1	1	1	3	−2	1

Source: Kuensel
(H) Hosts
29 May 2025
18:00 UTC+6

Bhutan	0–0	Hong Kong
	Report (BFF); Report (BOC)

Changlimithang Stadium, Thimphu

31 May 2025
18:00 UTC+6

Malaysia	1–2	Hong Kong
Steffi 38'	Report	Fung 25'; Ho 79'

Changlimithang Stadium, Thimphu

3 June 2025
18:00 UTC+6

Bhutan	1–3	Malaysia
Bidha 24'	Report	Intan 29'; Ainsyah 45+5'; Farahiyah 90+7'

Changlimithang Stadium, Thimphu
