= 2016 Piala Tun Sharifah Rodziah =

Tournament details
- Host country: Malaysia
- Dates: 7–16 April 2016
- Teams: 12 (from 20 associations)

Final positions
- Champions: (Malaysia) MISC-MIFA (2nd title)
- Runners-up: Sabah
- Third place: Kedah

Tournament statistics
- Matches played: 34
- Goals scored: 129 (3.79 per match)
- Top scorer(s): Haindee Mosroh (14 goals)
- Best player(s): Dadree Rofinus

The 2016 Piala Tun Sharifah Rodziah is the 29th edition of Piala Tun Sharifah Rodziah a women's football tournament organised by Football Association of Malaysia. Kedah was the host and it took place in the Universiti Utara Malaysia, Sintok, Kedah. MISC-MIFA defeated Sabah in the final to retain their Piala Tun Sharifah Rodziah title after won the title for the first time in 2015.

The tournament offers prize money of RM20,000, a trophy and 25 gold medals to the winner, while the runner-up RM 10,000 and 25 silver medals and third place RM 5,000 and 25 bronze.

== Teams ==
The draw for the group stage was held on 5 April 2017 at the Dewan Budi Siswa, Pusat Budaya dan Seni, Universiti Utara Malaysia. 12 teams participated in this edition where the teams were divided into two groups. The winners and runners-up advance to the semifinals.

Group A	Group B
Sabah	(Malaysia) MISC-MIFA
Negeri Sembilan	Perak
Sarawak	Penang
ATM	Pahang
Perlis	Kuala Lumpur
Selangor	Kedah

== Venue ==
Universiti Utara Malaysia, Sintok, Kedah

- Padang 1
- Padang 2
- Padang 3

== Fixtures and results ==
=== Group stage ===
==== Group A ====
Pos	Team	Pld	W	D	L	GF	GA	GD	Pts	Qualification
1	Sabah	5	5	0	0	27	1	+26	15	Semifinals
2	Sarawak	5	2	2	1	11	7	+4	8	Semifinals
3	Selangor	5	2	1	2	8	8	0	7	
4	ATM	5	2	1	2	6	6	0	7	
5	Negeri Sembilan	5	2	0	3	8	16	−8	6	
6	Perlis	5	0	0	5	1	23	−22	0	

Updated to match(es) played on 12 April 2016. Source: FAM

Date		Score	
MD1; 7 April 2016	Negeri Sembilan	0–6	Sabah
MD1; 7 April 2016	Sarawak	4–0	Perlis
MD1; 7 April 2016	ATM	0–3	Selangor
MD2; 8 April 2016	Sabah	4–0	Sarawak
MD2; 8 April 2016	Negeri Sembilan	0–4	ATM
MD2; 8 April 2016	Perlis	0–3	Selangor
MD3; 9 April 2016	Sabah	2–0	ATM
MD3; 9 April 2016	Perlis	1–6	Negeri Sembilan
MD3; 9 April 2016	Selangor	1–1	Sarawak
MD4; 11 April 2016	Sabah	9–0	Perlis
MD4; 11 April 2016	Sarawak	1–1	ATM
MD4; 11 April 2016	Selangor	0–1	Negeri Sembilan
MD5; 12 April 2016	Sabah	6–1	Selangor
MD5; 12 April 2016	Negeri Sembilan	1–5	Sarawak
MD5; 12 April 2016	ATM	1–0	Perlis

==== Group B ====
Pos	Team	Pld	W	D	L	GF	GA	GD	Pts	Qualification
1	(Malaysia) MISC-MIFA	5	4	1	0	19	2	+17	13	Semifinals
2	Kedah	5	3	2	0	9	3	+6	11	Semifinals
3	Kuala Lumpur	5	3	1	1	15	5	+10	10	
4	Pahang	5	2	0	3	7	12	−5	6	
5	Perak	5	1	0	4	4	10	−6	3	
6	Penang	5	0	0	5	0	22	−22	0	

Updated to match(es) played on 12 April 2016. Source: FAM

Date		Score	
MD1; 7 April 2016	Perak	0–4	(Malaysia) MISC-MIFA
MD1; 7 April 2016	Penang	0–5	Kuala Lumpur
MD1; 7 April 2016	Pahang	1–3	Kedah
MD2; 8 April 2016	(Malaysia) MISC-MIFA	7–0	Penang
MD2; 8 April 2016	Perak	1–2	Pahang
MD2; 8 April 2016	Kuala Lumpur	1–1	Kedah
MD3; 9 April 2016	(Malaysia) MISC-MIFA	3–0	Pahang
MD3; 9 April 2016	Kuala Lumpur	3–0	Perak
MD3; 9 April 2016	Kedah	3–0	Penang
MD4; 11 April 2016	(Malaysia) MISC-MIFA	4–1	Kuala Lumpur
MD4; 11 April 2016	Penang	0–4	Pahang
MD4; 11 April 2016	Kedah	1–0	Perak
MD5; 12 April 2016	(Malaysia) MISC-MIFA	1–1	Kedah
MD5; 12 April 2016	Perak	3–0	Penang
MD5; 12 April 2016	Pahang	0–5	Kuala Lumpur

=== Knockout stage ===
Semifinals
14 April 2016
Sabah	5
Kedah	0
14 April 2016
(Malaysia) MISC-MIFA	3
Sarawak	0

Final
16 April 2016
Sabah	2
(Malaysia) MISC-MIFA	3
Third place
16 April 2016
Kedah	1
Sarawak	0

== Third place ==
16 April 2016
08:00 UTC+8

Kedah	1–0	Sarawak
Nurul Ashikin Mohd Jasrie 65'	Report

Universiti Utara Malaysia Mini Stadium, Sintok, Kedah

== Final ==
16 April 2016
16:45 UTC+8

Sabah	2–3	(Malaysia) MISC-MIFA
Shereilynn Elly Pius 16'; Juciah Jumilis 30'	Report	Sihaya Ajad 9'; Haindee Mosroh 13'; Dadree Rofinus 77'

Universiti Utara Malaysia Mini Stadium, Sintok, Kedah, Sintok, Kedah
Referee: Nurul Ain Izzaty Zainal

== Champions ==
2016 Piala Tun Sharifah Rodziah
Champions
(Malaysia) MISC-MIFA
2nd Title

== Goalscorers ==
Rank	Player	Team	MD1	MD2	MD3	MD4	MD5	SF	3	F	Total
1	Haindee Mosroh	(Malaysia) MISC-MIFA	1	5	2	2	1	2	0	1	14
2	Nurul Azurin Mazlan	Sabah	3	2	1	4	0	2	0	0	12
3	Shereilynn Elly Pius	Sabah	1	1	0	2	3	1	0	1	9
4	Usliza Usman	Sabah	1	1	1	0	1	1	0	0	5
4	Siti Rohani Saptu	Sarawak	3	0	0	0	2	0	0	0	5
4	Zur'ain Kamarudin	Selangor	2	1	1	0	1	0	0	0	5
4	Farahiyah Muhamad Ridzuan	Kuala Lumpur	2	0	2	0	1	0	0	0	5
8	Jaciah Jumilis	Sabah	1	0	0	1	1	0	0	1	4
8	Puteri Noralisa Wilkinson	Pahang	0	2	0	2	0	0	0	0	4
10	Syamimi Ibrahim	Sarawak	1	0	1	1	1	0	0	0	3
10	Dadree Rofinus	(Malaysia) MISC-MIFA	1	1	0	0	0	0	0	1	3
10	Sihaya Ajad	(Malaysia) MISC-MIFA	1	0	0	1	0	0	0	1	3
10	Noor Hartini Jasni	Kedah	1	0	1	1	0	0	0	0	3
10	Nur Atikah Abdul Wahab	ATM	0	2	0	1	0	0	0	0	3
10	Nur Haniza Saarani	Perak	0	1	0	0	2	0	0	0	3
10	Norhawa Md Yasin	Kuala Lumpur	0	1	0	0	2	0	0	0	3
17
17	Nurul Hamira Yusma Mohd Yusri	(Malaysia) MISC-MIFA	0	1	0	0	0	1	0	0	2
17	Masyita Mohd Tajib	Kuala Lumpur	2	0	0	0	0	0	0	0	2
17	Nurul Izzati Zainol	Kedah	2	0	0	0	0	0	0	0	2
17	Fatimah Mohamad	ATM	0	1	0	0	1	0	0	0	2
17	Siti Asnidah Zamri	Selangor	0	2	0	0	0	0	0	0	2
17	Nurul Fatiha Jamal	Negeri Sembilan	0	0	1	0	1	0	0	0	2
17	Farahana Muhamad	Negeri Sembilan	0	0	2	0	0	0	0	0	2
17	Nor Adilah Idrus	Kedah	0	0	1	0	1	0	0	0	2
17	Malini Nordin	Kuala Lumpur	0	0	0	1	1	0	0	0	2
26	Yasrika Laura Tumas	Sabah	0	0	0	1	0	1	0	0	1
26	Nur Athirah Farhanah Zairi	Sabah	0	0	0	1	0	0	0	0	1
26	Intan Nur Ameelia Amran	Selangor	1	0	0	0	0	0	0	0	1
26	Pedrolia Martin Sikayun	(Malaysia) MISC-MIFA	1	0	0	0	0	0	0	0	1
26	Shafikah Mohammad Sharum	Pahang	1	0	0	0	0	0	0	0	1
26	Nurafini Kamarudin	ATM	0	1	0	0	0	0	0	0	1
26	Munirah Abdullah	Kedah	0	1	0	0	0	0	0	0	1
26	Zolyn Zulaiqha Mohamad Faudzi	Perlis	0	0	1	0	0	0	0	0	1
26	Nor Syazwani Din	Negeri Sembilan	0	0	1	0	0	0	0	0	1
26	Siti Maziah Mohd Faudzi	Negeri Sembilan	0	0	1	0	0	0	0	0	1
26	Nurulain Afiqah Mohd Yusni	Negeri Sembilan	0	0	1	0	0	0	0	0	1
26	Eslisah Esar	(Malaysia) MISC-MIFA	0	0	1	0	0	0	0	0	1
26	Siti Nur Atiqah Rashid	Kuala Lumpur	0	0	1	0	0	0	0	0	1
26	Mira Fazliana Aidi	Kedah	0	0	1	0	0	0	0	0	1
26	Ainsuraya Jamil	Negeri Sembilan	0	0	0	1	0	0	0	0	1
26	Marlia Basri	(Malaysia) MISC-MIFA	0	0	0	1	0	0	0	0	1
26	Norsuriani Mazli	Pahang	0	0	0	1	0	0	0	0	1
26	Salisa Thomas	Sabah	0	0	0	0	1	0	0	0	1
26	Rabiah Bishriyah Abdul Kadir	Sarawak	0	0	0	0	1	0	0	0	1
26	Judith Tunsai	Sarawak	0	0	0	0	1	0	0	0	1
26	Fadhatul Najwa Nurfarahain Azmi	Perak	0	0	0	0	1	0	0	0	1
26	Hanis Farhana Shamsul Azizan	Kuala Lumpur	0	0	0	0	1	0	0	0	1
26	Nurul Ashikin Mohd Jasrie	Kedah	0	0	0	0	0	1	0	0	1
#	Own goals		1	0	0	1	0	0	0	0	2
