= Usliza Usman =

Malaysian footballer

Personal information
- Full name: Usliza binti Usman
- Date of birth: 20 May 1995 (age 31)
- Place of birth: Sandakan, Sabah, Malaysia
- Position: Midfielder

Team information
- Current team: Sabah FA
- Number: 9

Senior career*
Years	Team	Apps	(Gls)
- Selangor
2024–	Sabah FA		

International career
- Malaysia
- Malaysia (futsal)
- * Club domestic league appearances and goals

Usliza Usman (born 20 May 1995) is a Malaysian women's footballer who plays a midfielder for Malaysia National Women's League club Sabah FA Women's and the Malaysia women's national team.

== Career ==
Usliza represented Malaysia at the 2016 AFF Women's Championship.
