= 2015 Piala Tun Sharifah Rodziah =

Tournament details
- Host country: Malaysia
- Dates: 2 August – 8 August 2015
- Teams: 10 (from 20 associations)

Final positions
- Champions: (Malaysia) MISC-MIFA (2nd title)
- Runners-up: Sabah
- Third place: PDRM

Tournament statistics
- Matches played: 24
- Goals scored: 98 (4.08 per match)
- Top scorer(s): Nor Athirah Mamat (12 goals)
- Best player: Nurul Azurin Mazlan

The 2015 Piala Tun Sharifah Rodziah is the 28th edition of Piala Tun Sharifah Rodziah a women's football tournament organised by Football Association of Malaysia. Slinger was the host and it took place in the Universiti Kebangsaan Malaysia and Institut Latihan Kehakiman & Perundangan (ILKAP), Bandar Baru Bangi, Selangor. MISC-MIFA defeated Sabah the defending champions in the final by penalty shoot-out to win their first Piala Tun Sharifah Rodziah title.

== Groups ==
=== Group A ===
| Pos | Team | Pld | W | D | L | GF | GA | GD | Pts | Qualification or relegation |
|---|---|---|---|---|---|---|---|---|---|---|
| 1 | Sabah | 4 | 4 | 0 | 0 | 31 | 0 | +31 | 12 | Advance to Semifinals |
| 2 | Sarawak | 4 | 2 | 1 | 1 | 7 | 4 | +3 | 7 | Advance to Semifinals |
| 3 | Selangor | 4 | 2 | 1 | 1 | 7 | 6 | +1 | 7 | |
| 4 | Negeri Sembilan | 4 | 1 | 0 | 3 | 3 | 25 | −22 | 3 | |
| 5 | Penang | 4 | 0 | 0 | 4 | 1 | 16 | −15 | 0 | |

Updated to match(es) played on 10 April 2017. Source: FAM
Rules for classification: 1) Points; 2) Goal difference; 3) Number of goals scored.
2 August 2015
16:45

| Penang | 0–1 | Selangor |
|---|---|---|
| | Report | Nur Fazira Muhammad Sani 34' |

Padang A, UKM
2 August 2015
16:45

| Sabah | 16–0 | Negeri Sembilan |
|---|---|---|
| Nor Athirah Mamat 6', 17', 26', 66', 71'; Jaciah Jumilis 10'; Thera Delstey Thomas 16', 21', 39', 41'; Nuraziela Ali Jainal 23'; Rosdiana Deline Jerus 28'; Siti Nurfaizah Saidin 34'; Zaffeka Zakaria 40', 64'; Zaryatie Zakaria 72' | Report |

Padang B, UKM

3 August 2015
16:45

| Sabah | 7–0 | Penang |
|---|---|---|
| Yastrika Laura Tumas 14'; Nor Athirah Mamat 50', 65'; Nuraziela Ali Jainal 33', 44'; Siti Nurfaizah Saidin 18', 19' | Report |

Padang C, UKM
3 August 2015
16:45

| Selangor | 1–1 | Sarawak |
|---|---|---|
| Nur Dianah Athirah Zulkefly 53' | Report | Rogayah Ali 22' |

ILKAP

=== Group B ===
| Pos | Team | Pld | W | D | L | GF | GA | GD | Pts | Qualification or relegation |
|---|---|---|---|---|---|---|---|---|---|---|
| 1 | (Malaysia) MISC-MIFA | 4 | 4 | 0 | 0 | 13 | 0 | +13 | 12 | Advance to Semifinals |
| 2 | PDRM | 4 | 3 | 0 | 1 | 13 | 0 | +13 | 9 | Advance to Semifinals |
| 3 | Pahang | 4 | 1 | 1 | 2 | 3 | 3 | 0 | 4 | |
| 4 | Perak | 4 | 1 | 0 | 3 | 2 | 16 | −14 | 3 | |
| 5 | ATM | 4 | 0 | 0 | 4 | 0 | 8 | −8 | 0 | |

Updated to match(es) played on 10 April 2017. Source: FAM
Rules for classification: 1) Points; 2) Goal difference; 3) Number of goals scored.

== Champions ==
2015 Piala Tun Sharifah Rodziah
Champions
(Malaysia) MISC-MIFA
1st Title
