= Enzi Broussard =

American soccer player (born 2001)

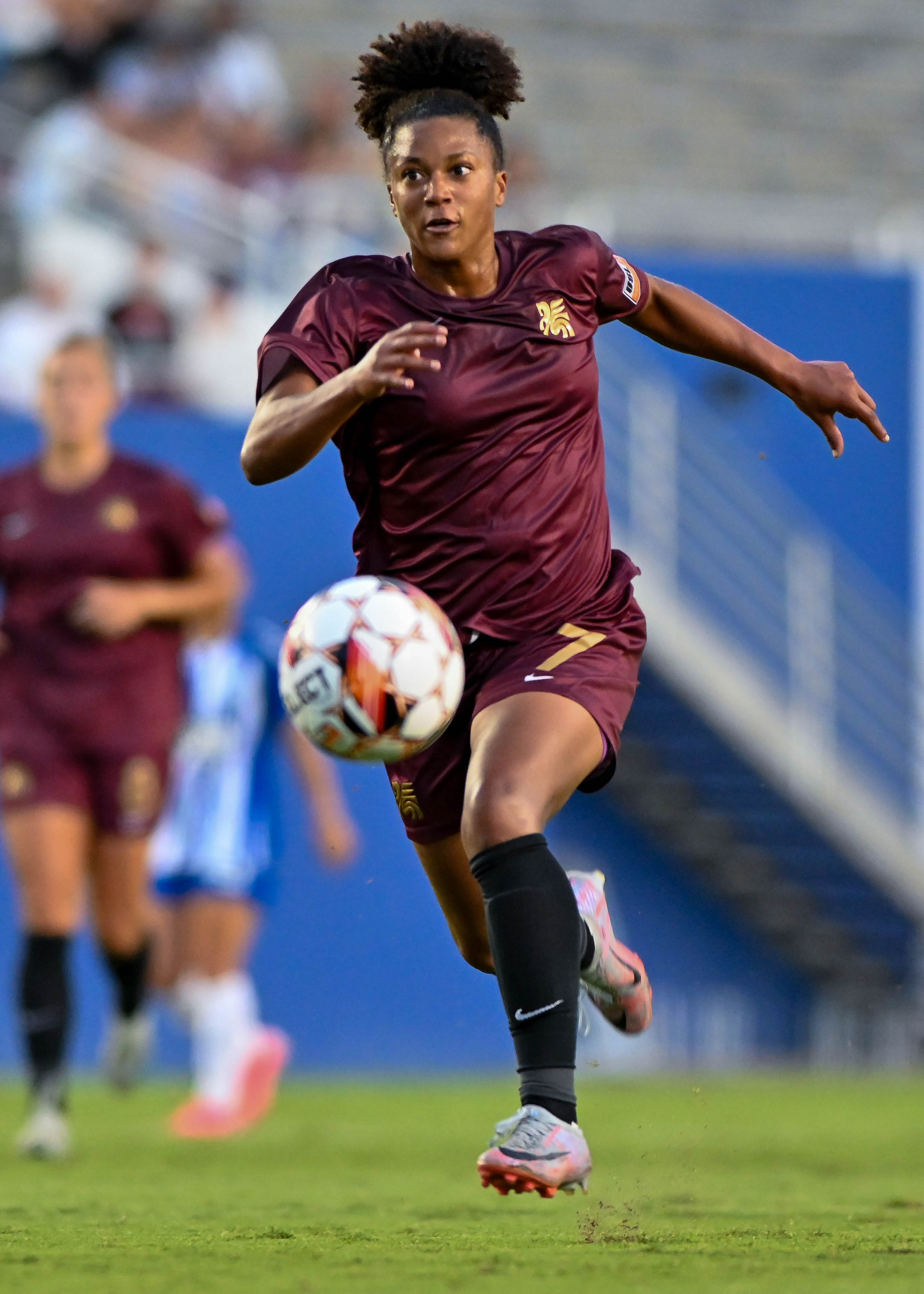
- Broussard with Dallas Trinity in 2024

Personal information
- Full name: Enzi Hekima Starks Broussard
- Date of birth: June 16, 2001 (age 25)
- Place of birth: Dallas, Texas, U.S.
- Height: 5 ft 5 in (1.65 m)
- Position: Forward

Youth career
- IMG Academy

College career
Years	Team	Apps	(Gls)
2019–2020	West Virginia Mountaineers	30	(5)
2021	Washington State Cougars	13	(3)

Senior career*
Years	Team	Apps	(Gls)
2022–2023	San Antonio Athenians		
2023	Changnyeong WFC	16	(5)
2024–2025	Dallas Trinity	7	(0)
2026–	Sabah FA	9	(15)

International career^{‡}
2017–2018	United States U17	4	(1)
- * Club domestic league appearances and goals as of July 1, 2025 ‡ National team caps and goals as of January 19, 2018

Enzi Hekima Starks Broussard (born June 16, 2001) is an American professional soccer player who plays as a forward. She played college soccer for the West Virginia Mountaineers and the Washington State Cougars.

== Early life ==
Broussard was born in Dallas, Texas. Before committing to West Virginia University, she was a four-star recruit who played for the U-17 USWNT and honed her skills in the U.S. Soccer Development Academy at IMG Academy.

== College career ==
=== West Virginia ===
Broussard joined the West Virginia Mountaineers in 2019. She played for the Mountaineers for two seasons, making 30 appearances and scoring 5 goals.

=== Washington State ===
Broussard transferred to Washington State in March 2021. She played for only one season with the Cougars.

== Club career ==
=== San Antonio Athenians SC ===
After college, Broussard returned to Texas and joined San Antonio Athenians SC in April 2022, a pre-professional side in the USL W League.

=== Changnyeong WFC ===
In 2023, Broussard joined South Korean club Changnyeong WFC, securing one of the three spots available for foreign players on the team. Changnyeong scored 15 goals in the 2023 season, with Broussard contributing 5.

=== Dallas Trinity FC ===
On July 10, 2024, Broussard signed with Dallas Trinity FC of the USL Super League. She made her club debut on August 18, 2024, starting in Dallas's inaugural match against Tampa Bay.
