= Bobby Gonzales =

Malaysian footballer

Personal information
- Full name: Bobby Gonzales
- Date of birth: 15 February 1984 (age 42)
- Place of birth: Beaufort, Sabah, Malaysia
- Height: 1.73 m (5 ft 8 in)
- Position: Forward

Team information
- Current team: Sabah FA Women's (coach)

Senior career*
Years	Team	Apps	(Gls)
2003–2005	Sabah		(2)
2005–2006	Sarawak		(2)
2006–2008	Sabah		(12)
2009	KL PLUS		(4)
2010–2012	Sabah		(9)
2011	→ Sarawak (loan)	21	(16)
2013	Sarawak	22	(21)
2014	PDRM	22	(8)
2015	Perak	6	(2)
2016	FELDA United	2	(0)
2017	PKNS	8	(1)
2018–2019	Sarawak	40	(23)
2020	Penang	9	(1)
2021	Sabah	13	(2)

International career^{‡}
2001	Malaysia U17		
2003–2004	Malaysia U19		
2004–2007	Malaysia U23		
2013–2014	Malaysia	4	(0)

Managerial career
- 2022: Sabah U19 (assistant coach)
- 2025–: Sabah FA Women's
- * Club domestic league appearances and goals as of 9 October 2020 ‡ National team caps and goals as of 24 January 2017

Bobby Gonzales (born 15 February 1984) is a former Malaysian professional footballer. He spent most of his career with Sabah and Sarawak where he played as a forward. He currently head coach for Malaysia National Women's League club Sabah FA Women's.

== Personal life ==
Bobby was born and raised in Beaufort, Sabah. He attend All Saints Secondary School in Kota Kinabalu and Bukit Jalil Sports School. He is a Muslim.

== Club career ==
=== Youth ===
Bobby started his professional career with Sabah during the 2003 Malaysian League by making his debut against Terengganu. He was part of the squad that finished as runners-up in the 2003 Malaysia Cup. He also represented the Malaysia youth team for 2001 Asian School Championship in Kuala Lumpur where Malaysia finished third. He also played for Malaysia U-20 team in the Singapore Cup and was listed in the preliminary squad for the 2004 AFC Youth Championship, he however did not make it for the final squad.

=== Sabah ===
During the 2007–08 season, Bobby scored 13 goals to become Sabah's all season top scorer with André Scotti Ossemer. His performances earned him a call-up for national under 23 preparation for 2007 SEA Games. He however failed to earn a place in the squad.

=== KL PLUS ===
For the 2009 season, Bobby signed for PLUS FC. He made his debut against Terengganu and scored a spectacular 25-meter goal.

=== Sabah ===
Due to an injury in mid-season, he missed half of Super League season and only made his return in the Malaysia Cup. After the season ended, he returned to Sabah and joined the team for 2010 Malaysian League season. He was dropped from the Sabah squad at the end of the league season.

=== Loan Out to Sarawak ===
For the 2011 Malaysia Premier League season, he joined Sarawak. After a superb season with Sarawak, where he helped the team to second place in Premier League and win promotion to 2012 Super League Malaysia by scoring 16 league goals, he left the team and returned to Sabah for the next season.

=== From Sarawak to Sabah 2012 Season ===
On 5 December 2011, Gonzales returned to Sabah at the end of the season having made 21 appearances with Sarawak, as he helped Sarawak promote the Malaysian Super League. He made his Malaysia Super League debut on 10 January 2012 against Felda United in a 2–0 away defeat. On 14 January, Gonzales scored a goal in 45th minutes of first half against former club Sarawak in a 2–1 win at the Likas Stadium. Gonzales scored his last goal in the 2012 season in a 3–1 win against Negeri Sembilan. He finished the season with two league goals in nine games.

=== Return to Sarawak in 2012 ===
Bobby join Sarawak on loan from Sabah during the 2012 Malaysia Cup. He scored Sarawak's winning goal in an opening group game of Malaysia Cup against Selangor. He also scored in a 6–1 win against T-Team.

After only one season with Sabah, Sarawak confirmed that Gonzales would join the club on 4 November 2012 from Sarawak on a free transfer with only performance-related incentives due to Sabah, after agreeing on terms and signing a long-term contract. His contract was worth RM24K net per year and was given the number 9 shirt, the same number he wore for Sarawak during his first spell.

On 7 January, Gonzales made his league debut return for Sarawak in the 2–1 league opening game win against Perlis at Kangar Stadium. Four days later on 11 January, he scored double in the 30th minute in a 5–0 home win against UITM FC. On 14 January, he scored in the 45th minute in a 1–1 away draw against Putrajaya SPA. On 25 January, he scored two second-half goals in Sarawak's 3–0 Malaysia FA Cup first round victory against Malacca at Sarawak State Stadium, but he was denied a hat-trick in the last minute half by a save by Malacca FA goalkeeper Nor Iman. Bobby's brace against Malacca made him the finest poacher player since Alistair Edwards to hit the two-goal mark for Sarawak.

On 26 April, Gonzales was the toast of his team after having scored four goals for the Crocs in their Malaysia Premier League match against UiTM in away win 3–5 held at UiTM Stadium. He scored a third consecutive brace at Sarawak State Stadium in a 7–0 home win against NS Betaria. On 4 May, bringing his tally to 17 goals in 18 games. This made him Sarawak's most prolific goals per game scorer of all time ahead of Sarawak legend John Hunter. On 21 May, he scored his 19th goal in 19 appearances for Sarawak against Pos Malaysia in a 2–0 away win. In the final league match on 5 July, Bobby scores his first derby goal against his hometown Sabah at Likas Stadium with 2–1 win as he helped the Sarawak ended the 2013 Premier League as the unbeaten champions.

On 31 August, Bobby Gonzales scored his two goals for Sarawak in a 4–0 win in the Malaysia Cup of group D. He scored his fourth goal of the Group D at home to Perak on Saturday by trashing 6–1 victory on 21 September. On 26 October 2013, Bobby scored in Sarawak Malaysia Cup semi-final second leg against Pahang, though his side went out 4–2 on aggregate.

=== PDRM ===
After released by Sarawak at the end of 2013, Bobby joined PDRM on a 1-year contract. He won his second Malaysia Premier League title and left at the end of the season, mainly due to Dollah Salleh departures to coach the Malaysia national football team.

=== Perak ===
Bobby has joined Perak on a 1-year contract. He made his debut in a home match against PDRM. He scored his first goal for Perak in a 2–1 away defeat against Terengganu. He made 6 league appearances scoring 2 goals. He currently hold the all-time top scorer of Malaysia Premier League with 90 goals.

== International career ==
Bobby received a call-up to play for Malaysia's national team in early November 2013, due to his good performances with Sarawak in the 2013 Malaysia Cup. He received the call-up along with his Sarawak teammate Hairol Mokhtar by national coach K. Rajagopal for a friendly match against Kuwait in Kuwait City. He played his first game for the national team against the Kuwait on 8 November 2013. In 2014, Bobby was listed as one of the overage players for the Asian Games. His name was dropped after the friendly match against Yemen Asian Games team.

== International appearances ==
#	Date	Venue	Opponent	Score	Result	Competition
1	8 November 2013	Kuwait City, Kuwait	Kuwait	0	3–0 (L)	Friendly
2	1 March 2014	Selayang, Malaysia	Philippines	0	0–0 (D)	Friendly
3	5 March 2014	Al Ain, UAE	Yemen	0	2–1 (W)	2015 AFC Asian Cup qualification
4	27 April 2014	Cebu, Philippines	Philippines	0	0–0 (D)	Friendly

== Career statistics ==
Statistics accurate as of 18 November 2021

Appearances and goals by club, season and competition
Club	Season	League			FA Cup		Malaysia Cup		Others		Total	
Club	Season	Division	Apps	Goals	Apps	Goals	Apps	Goals	Apps	Goals	Apps	Goals
Sabah	2003	Malaysia Premier One League		0		0		3	—			3
Sabah	2004	Malaysia Super League		2		0		0	—			2
Sabah	2005	Malaysia Super League		0		0		0	—			0
Sarawak	2005–06	Malaysia Premier League		2		0		0	—			2
Sabah	2006–07	Malaysia Premier League		2		0		0	—			2
Sabah	2007–08	Malaysia Premier League		10		0		3	—			13
PLUS	2009	Malaysia Super League		4		1		0	—			5
Sabah	2010	Malaysia Premier League		7		0		0	—			7
Sarawak (loan)	2011	Malaysia Premier League	21	16	1	0	6	2	—		28	18
Sabah	2012	Malaysia Super League	16	2	1	0	—		—		17	2
Sarawak (loan)	2012	Malaysia Super League	—				6	2	—		6	2
Sarawak	2013	Malaysia Premier League	22	21	4	3	10	4	—		35	28
PDRM	2014	Malaysia Premier League	22	8	4	1	8	4	—		34	13
Perak	2015	Malaysia Super League	6	2	2	0	6	1	—		14	3
Felda United	2016	Malaysia Super League	2	0	0	0	2	0	—		4	0
PKNS	2017	Malaysia Super League	8	1	1	0	4	1	—		13	2
Sarawak	2018	Malaysia Premier League	20	14	1	0	—		6	0	27	14
Sarawak	2019	Malaysia Premier League	20	9	1	0	—		5	0	26	9
Penang	2020	Malaysia Premier League	9	1	—		1	0	—		10	1
Sabah	2021	Malaysia Super League	13	2	—		5	0	—		18	2
Career total				103		5		20	—			128

== Honours ==
Sarawak

- Malaysia Premier League: 2013

PDRM

- Malaysia Premier League: 2014

Penang

- Malaysia Premier League: 2020

Individual

- Malaysia Premier League all-time top goalscorer: 90 goals
