= Malaysia Pahang Sports School =

Malaysian football club

SSMP
- Nickname: The Young Tigers
- Association: Football Association of Malaysia (FAM)
- Confederation: AFC
- Sub-confederation: AFF (Southeast Asia)
- Head coach: Mohd Zerry Bin Nazeri
- Website: Official website

The Malaysia Pahang Sports School (SSMP) or Sekolah Sukan Malaysia Pahang represents Malaysia in under-15 and under-16 tournaments. It is controlled by the Football Association of Malaysia. Their women's section competes in the Liga Puteri-FAM. The school is located at the Gambang compound in Kuantan, Pahang.

== History ==
Sekolah Sukan Malaysia Pahang (SSMP), also known as the Malaysia Pahang Sports School, is a premier sports school located in Bandar Gambang, Kuantan, Pahang. Established in 2012, SSMP is the third national sports school in Malaysia, following the Sekolah Sukan Bukit Jalil (1995) and the Sekolah Sukan Tunku Mahkota Ismail (1998).

=== Liga Wanita Nasional ===
Sekolah Sukan Malaysia Pahang (SSMP) actively participated in the 2023 Liga Wanita Nasional (Malaysia National Women's League), showcasing commendable performances throughout the season. SSMP secured 2nd place in the league, finishing just behind champions Sabah FA. SSMP's Kaseh Carlmila Az Zahra emerged as the league's top scorer, netting 6 goals during the season. SSMP achieved the biggest away win of the season with a 5–0 triumph over Selangor on November 4.

== Campus and facilities ==
The SSMP spans at 120-acre campus divided into three main zones. Academic Zone features administrative offices, 24 classrooms, science and language labs, a sports science lab, computer labs, and specialized rooms for teaching subjects. Sports Zone is equipped with a football training field, athletics track, archery range, futsal and basketball courts, and a gymnastics hall. Residential zone includes male and female dormitories, dining facilities, and staff housing. The school is situated opposite of the Universiti Malaysia Pahang (UMP) and next to the Mokhtar Dahari Academy.

== Coaching staff ==
As of 1 December 2024

Head coach	(Malaysia) Mohd Zerry Bin Nazeri
Team manager	(Malaysia) Mohd Nasaruddin Bin Abdullah
Assistant manager	(Malaysia) Hadaniah Binti Razali

== See also ==
- Harimau Muda A
- Harimau Muda B
- Harimau Muda C
- Bukit Jalil Sports School
