= Steffi Sarge Kaur =

Malaysian footballer

Personal information
- Full name: Steffi Sarge Kaur d/o Sergeant Singh Sidhu
- Date of birth: 25 October 1988 (age 38)
- Place of birth: Taiping, Perak, Malaysia
- Height: 1.73 m (5 ft 8 in)
- Position: Defender

Senior career*
Years	Team	Apps	(Gls)
2022	Melaka United	5	(2)
2023	LMS Tigress	3	(0)
2023	MBSJ		
2024	Kelana United	13	(4)
2024	Sabah	5	(0)
2025	MBSJ	1	(0)
2026–	Sabah	1	(0)

International career^{‡}
2007–	Malaysia	31	(4)
- * Club domestic league appearances and goals ‡ National team caps and goals as of 22 June 2025

Steffi Sarge Kaur d/o Sergeant Singh Sidhu (born 25 October 1988) is a Malaysian footballer who plays as a defender for the Malaysia women's national football team.

== Early life ==
She played badminton, hockey, and netball as a child.

== Club career ==
Steffi played for several football clubs in Malaysia. She played for MBSJ FC in the FAS Women's Super League. She also played for Melaka in 2022 Piala Tun Sharifah Rodziah, LMS Tigress in 2023 Malaysia Women's National League and Kelana United in 2024 Malaysia Women's National League. She also played in the 2024–25 AFC Women's Champions League with Sabah.

== International career ==
Steffi has represented Malaysia internationally at football, futsal, and footgolf. She made her debut with Malaysia women's football team in 2007. She participated in the 2007 AFF Women's Championship, 2007 Southeast Asian Games, 2008 AFC Women's Asian Cup qualification, and 2011 AFF Women's Championship. Few years later, she played for Malaysia women's futsal team for AFC Women's Futsal Championship, ASEAN Women's Futsal Championship and the Southeast Asian Games. After 10 years, she return to the women's national team for 2022 AFC Women's Asian Cup qualification in 2021. She scored her first international goal in a 2–0 win against Palestine.

== Style of play ==
She mainly operates as a defender and has been described as "definitely has the leadership quality required to be a good team captain".

== International goals ==
No.	Date	Venue	Opponent	Score	Result	Competition
1.	22 September 2021	Faisal Al-Husseini International Stadium, Al-Ram, Palestine	Palestine	2–0	2–0	2022 AFC Women's Asian Cup qualification
2.	6 July 2022	Biñan Football Stadium, Biñan, Philippines	Indonesia	1–1	1–1	2022 AFF Women's Championship
3.	30 September 2023	King Fahd Sports City, Taif, Saudi Arabia	Saudi Arabia	1–0	1–0	2023 SAFF Women's International Friendly Tournament
4.	31 May 2025	Changlimithang Stadium, Thimphu, Bhutan	Hong Kong	1–1	1–2	2025 Women's Tri-Nation Cup

== Personal life ==
She is of Chindian and Malaysian Siamese descent.
