= Piala Tun Sharifah Rodziah =

- Founded: 1976; 50 years ago
- Country: Malaysia
- Confederation: AFC
- Number of clubs: 8
- Current champions: Melaka (3rd title)
- Most championships: Sabah (11 titles)

Piala Tun Sharifah Rodziah (English: Tun Sharifah Rodziah Cup) is a women's football tournament in Malaysia. It was established in 1976. The competition is managed by the Football Association of Malaysia (FAM).

== History ==
Women's football competitions have been held in Malaysia since 1960. Women Football Association of Malaysia (PBWM) was registered in December 1974, and the first president was Tun Sharifah Rodziah. A proper tournament was held in 1976 when PBWM introduced the Piala Tun Sharifah Rodziah. A new trophy was contributed by Tunku Abdul Rahman. The cup format followed the Piala Malaysia. A total of eight teams from Johor, Melaka, Negeri Sembilan, Selangor, Pahang, Perak, Penang and Singapore competed.

The cup was held on a consistent basis until 2004. It made a comeback in 2015 for the 28th edition. A total of ten teams participated in the revival season of the tournament. The 2015 season was won by MISC-MIFA. In 2016, MISC-MIFA defended their championship by winning the cup for the second time. 12 teams participated in the 2017 edition of the tournament. The winner was Sarawak. In 2018, the tournament was contested by 8 teams. The final match was won by Kedah for the first time, defeating Melaka by 2–0.

== Teams ==
Below is the list of teams competing in the tournament by year.

=== 2022 ===
- Penang
- SSM Pahang
- Sabah
- (Malacca) Melaka (Champion)
- Negeri Sembilan
- Sarawak
- Selangor
- Kelantan

=== 2019 ===
- ATM
- Kedah
- Kelantan
- (Malacca) Melaka (Champion)
- (Malaysia) PDRM
- Perak
- Selangor

=== 2018 ===
- ATM
- Kedah (Champion)
- (Malacca) Melaka
- Negeri Sembilan
- (Malaysia) PBMM
- Penang
- Sabah
- Selangor

=== 2017 ===
- (Malaysia) MISC-MIFA
- Sabah
- Sarawak (Champion)
- (Malacca) Melaka (debut)
- Perak
- Pahang
- Negeri Sembilan
- Penang
- (Malaysia) PDRM
- Selangor
- Kelantan (debut)
- Kedah

=== 2016 ===
- Perlis
- Kedah
- Penang
- Perak
- Selangor
- Kuala Lumpur
- Negeri Sembilan
- Pahang
- Sabah
- Sarawak
- (Malaysia) MISC-MIFA (Champion)
- ATM

== Champions ==
Below is the list of champions since 1976.

| Year | Champions | Runners–up | Score |
|---|---|---|---|
| 1976 | Singapore | Negeri Sembilan | |
| 1977 | Singapore | Perak | |
| 1978 | Singapore | Selangor | |
| 1979 | Singapore | Perak | |
| 1980 | Singapore | (Malacca) Melaka | Shared |
| 1981 | Singapore | Negeri Sembilan | Shared |
| 1982 | Selangor | Singapore | Shared |
| 1983 | Singapore | —N/a | |
| 1984 | Johor | —N/a | |
| 1985 | Selangor | —N/a | |
| 1986 | Johor | Selangor | Shared |
| 1987 | Johor | —N/a | |
| 1988 | Sabah | —N/a | |
| 1989 | Johor | —N/a | |
| 1991 | Sabah | Johor | |
| 1992 | Sabah | Perak | 3–0 |
| 1993 | Sabah | Negeri Sembilan | 2–1 |
| 1994 | Sabah | (Malaysia) PDRM | 4–0 |
| 1995 | Sabah | Kuala Lumpur | 3–0 |
| 1996 | Sabah | Kuala Lumpur | 2–0 |
| 1997 | Sabah | Kuala Lumpur | 2–1 |
| 1998 | Sabah | (Malaysia) PDRM | |
| 1999 | (Malaysia) PDRM | Kuala Lumpur | |
| 2000 | (Malaysia) PDRM | Sabah | |
| 2002 | (Malaysia) PDRM | Sabah | |
| 2003 | Sabah | (Malaysia) PDRM | |
| 2004 | Sabah | (Malaysia) PDRM | |
| 2015 | (Malaysia) MISC-MIFA | Sabah | 1–1 (3–2 penalties) |
| 2016 | (Malaysia) MISC-MIFA | Sabah | 3–2 |
| 2017 | Sarawak | Kedah | 1–0 |
| 2018 | Kedah | (Malacca) Melaka | 2–0 |
| 2019 | (Malacca) Melaka | Kedah | 0–0 (3–1 penalties) |
| 2020–21 | Cancelled due to COVID-19 pandemic | | |
| 2022 | (Malacca) Melaka | Negeri Sembilan | 1–0 |

== Performance ==
| # | Team | Champions | Runners-up |
|---|---|---|---|
| 1 | Sabah | 11 | 4 |
| 2 | Singapore | 8 | 1 |
| 3 | Johor | 4 | 1 |
| 4 | (Malaysia) PDRM | 3 | 4 |
| 5 | Selangor | 3 | 1 |
| 6 | (Malacca) Melaka | 3 | 1 |
| 7 | (Malaysia) MISC | 2 | – |
| 8 | Negeri Sembilan | 1 | 3 |
| 9 | Kedah | 1 | 1 |
| 10 | Sarawak | 1 | – |
| 11 | Kuala Lumpur | – | 4 |
| 12 | Perak | – | 3 |
