= Selangor F.C. Women =

Malaysian women's association football club

Selangor Women
- Full name: Selangor Football Club Women
- Nickname: The Red Giants
- Founded: 2022; 4 years ago
- Ground: MPAJ Stadium
- Capacity: 1,050
- Owner: Red Giants Sdn. Bhd.
- Chairman: Tengku Amir Shah
- Head coach: Osmera Omaro
- League: National Women's League
- 2026: NWL, Runners-up
- Website: selangorfc.com
| Home colours | Away colours | Third colours |

Selangor Football Club Women is a Malaysian professional women's football club section of Selangor, based in Shah Alam, Selangor. Founded in 2022, they compete in the National Women's League, the top flight of women's football in Malaysia, and the FAS Women's Super League, the women's football league in Selangor. They play home matches at MPAJ Stadium.

== History ==
=== First season ===
Selangor F.C. Women started their inaugural season with participation in the 2022 National Women's League (Central Zone). Competing alongside five other clubs, the newly formed squad was selected through a comprehensive scouting process during the FAS Women's Super League tournament. Selangor F.C. Women earned the distinction of finishing as runners-up in the Central Zone. Their performance culminated in a commanding 5–0 victory over Kuala Lumpur at the JSA Arena in Setia Alam, securing qualification for the prestigious Tun Sharifah Rodziah Cup. The team continued to showcase their potential on the national stage during the 2022 Tun Sharifah Rodziah Cup. Despite a commendable effort throughout the tournament, Selangor F.C. Women concluded their campaign in fourth place after a closely contested 1–0 loss to Sabah in the third-place playoff.

=== FAS Women’s Super League ===
Selangor FC Women actively participate in the FAS Women's Super League, a key women's football competition organised by the Football Association of Selangor. The team uses the league as an important platform to develop players, gain competitive match experience, and prepare for national tournaments. Since their formation in 2022, Selangor FC Women have continued to strengthen their squad and enhance performances while representing Selangor in state-level women's football.

== Players ==
=== Current squad ===
As of 4 June 2026

Note: Flags indicate national team as defined under FIFA eligibility rules; some limited exceptions apply. Players may hold more than one non-FIFA nationality.

| No. | Pos. | Nation | Player |
|---|---|---|---|
| 1 | GK | MAS | Noorasyeimah Rashid |
| 2 | DF | MAS | Qistina Nikman |
| 3 | DF | MAS | Siti Zahirah Athirah |
| 5 | DF | MAS | Nicol Albert |
| 6 | MF | MAS | Nuratiqah Batrisyia |
| 7 | MF | MAS | Najwa Irdina |
| 9 | FW | MAS | Kaseh Carlmila |
| 10 | FW | MAS | Ku Nuwairah |
| 11 | DF | MAS | Nur Amirah Rahman |
| 12 | DF | MAS | Balqis Zamrin |
| 13 | GK | MAS | Rashidah Haniff |
| 14 | DF | MAS | Nurfarisya Hanim |
| 17 | MF | KOR | Yeo Min-ji |

| No. | Pos. | Nation | Player |
|---|---|---|---|
| 18 | MF | MAS | Thivashini Sivakumar |
| 20 | DF | MAS | Nurhadfina Firdaus |
| 19 | FW | MAS | Nurul Arliana Nabila |
| 20 | MF | MAS | Nurhadfina Firdaus |
| 22 | MF | MAS | Ainsyah Murad (captain) |
| 23 | DF | MAS | Euswevana Kadius |
| 24 | MF | MAS | Qaseh Rania |
| 25 | GK | MAS | Daiyana Wardina |
| 26 | MF | MAS | Mecca Rania |
| 27 | MF | JPN | Sakura Yoshida |
| 28 | GK | MAS | Nurdiana Syafiqah |
| 29 | FW | MEX | Julissa Cisneros |
| 30 | MF | MAS | Ayuna Anjani |

== Management ==
=== Coaching staff ===
As of 25 October 2025

| Position | Staff |
|---|---|
| Team manager | (Malaysia) Suzana Zakaria |
| Head coach | (Malaysia) Osmera Omaro |
| Assistant coach | (Malaysia) Felicia Adele (Malaysia) Noorul Hasrul Ameen |
| Goalkeeper coach | (Malaysia) Aizat Roslim |
| Physiotherapist | (Malaysia) Nadhirah Najat |
| Team staff | (Malaysia) Nurafiq Zainal |
| Team media | (Malaysia) Muhammad Faris Luqman |
| Team analyst | (Malaysia) Muhamad Nizamuddin |
| Nutritionist | (Malaysia) Lee Wan Qi |
| Kitman | (Malaysia) Ahmad Hafizi |

== Records and statistics ==
=== List of seasons ===
List of Selangor F.C. Women seasons
| Season | League | Pld | W | D | L | GF | GA | GD | Pts | Pos | TSRC | Top goalscorers | Goals (Note: Only competitive matches are counted.) | Ref. |
|---|---|---|---|---|---|---|---|---|---|---|---|---|---|---|
| 2022 | National Women's League | 10 | 8 | 1 | 1 | 49 | 5 | +44 | 25 | 2nd | 4th | (Malaysia) Mecca Rania | 12 | |
| 2023 | National Women's League | 8 | 1 | 2 | 5 | 3 | 17 | –12 | 5 | 5th | — | (Malaysia) Dian Aqilah | 2 | |
| 2024 | National Women's League | 14 | 9 | 2 | 3 | 49 | 6 | +43 | 29 | 3rd | — | (Malaysia) Ainsyah Murad | 15 | |
| 2025 | National Women's League | 14 | 11 | 1 | 2 | 62 | 12 | +49 | 34 | 2nd | — | (Malaysia) Ainsyah Murad | 17 | |

=== Matches ===
- First competitive match: Selangor 6–0 ATM, National Women's League (Central Zone), 4 June 2022
- First home match: Selangor 0–0 Kelana United at MBSJ Arena, National Women's League, 20 August 2023
- First away match: Malaysian University 0–1 Selangor at UiTM Stadium, National Women's League, 5 August 2023

==== Record wins ====
- Record win: Selangor 15–0 Real CJ, National Women's League, 13 October 2024
- Record home win: Selangor 15–0 Real CJ at UiTM Stadium, National Women's League, 13 October 2024
- Record away win: Real CJ 0–9 Selangor at Penang State Stadium, National Women's League, 21 July 2024

==== Record defeats ====
- Record defeat: Selangor 0–5 SSM Pahang, National Women's League, 2 November 2023
- Record home defeat: Selangor 0–5 SSM Pahang at Sepang Municipal Council Mini Stadium, National Women's League, 2 November 2023
- Record away defeat: Sabah 3–0 Selangor at Likas Stadium, National Women's League, 29 October 2023

=== Player records ===
- First goal: Fadhatul Najwa against ATM, National Women's League (Central Zone), 4 June 2022
- First penalty goal: Nur Fazira against ATM, National Women's League (Central Zone), 4 June 2022
- First assist: Nabila Jamin against ATM, National Women's League (Central Zone), 4 June 2022
- First clean sheet: Norazizah Nazri against ATM, National Women's League (Central Zone), 4 June 2022

=== FAS competition statistics ===
Competitions organized by FAS will be segregated as they are not competitive competitions.

==== List of seasons ====
List of Selangor F.C. Women seasons in FAS competition
| Season | League | | | | | | | | | | | Cup | | | Top goalscorers | | Ref. |
| Season | League | Pld | W | D | L | GF | GA | GD | Pts | Pos | Playoffs | FA | CC | SC | Player | Goals (Note: Super League goals only.) | Ref. |
|---|---|---|---|---|---|---|---|---|---|---|---|---|---|---|---|---|---|
| 2024 | Super League | 6 | 3 | 2 | 1 | 18 | 4 | +14 | 11 | 3rd | QF | QF | DNQ | — | (Malaysia) Najwa Irdina | 5 | |
| 2025 | Super League | 7 | 4 | 2 | 1 | 20 | 1 | +19 | 14 | 2nd | SF | SF | DNQ | DNQ | (Malaysia) Nurin Manan | 7 | |
| 2026 | Super League | 6 | 6 | 0 | 0 | 35 | 0 | +35 | 18 | 1st | W | W | DNQ | — | (Malaysia) Ainsyah Murad | 16 | |
