= 2022 Piala Tun Sharifah Rodziah =

Tournament details
- Country: Malaysia
- Dates: 6–11 September
- Teams: 8

Final positions
- Champions: Melaka United
- Runners-up: Negeri Sembilan
- Third place: Sabah

Tournament statistics
- Matches played: 16
- Goals scored: 61 (3.81 per match)
- Top goal scorer: Henrietta Justine (7 goals)
- All statistics correct as of 12 September 2022.

The 2022 Piala Tun Sharifah Rodziah was the 33rd edition of the Piala Tun Sharifah Rodziah, a women's football tournament organised by the Football Association of Malaysia. The defending champion was Melaka United. The group stage, semi-final and 3rd-place match were played at the JSA Setia Arena A & B, Setia Alam while the final were played at the Kuala Lumpur Stadium, Cheras.

== Teams ==
8 teams participated in the latest edition of the tournament, divided into two groups. The winners and the runners-up advanced to the semi-final.

Group A	Group B
Pulau Pinang	Negeri Sembilan
SSM Pahang	Sarawak
Sabah	Selangor
Melaka United	Kelantan

== Round, draw dates and venues ==
The draw for the group stage was held on 5 September 2022, 11:30 MYT (UTC+08) at the Wisma FAM in Petaling Jaya.

Phase	Round	Draw date	Date	Venues
Group Stage	Matchday 1	5 September 2022 (Wisma FAM)	6 September 2022	JSA Setia Arena, Setia Alam
Group Stage	Matchday 2	5 September 2022 (Wisma FAM)	7 September 2022	JSA Setia Arena, Setia Alam
Group Stage	Matchday 3	5 September 2022 (Wisma FAM)	8 September 2022	JSA Setia Arena, Setia Alam
Knockout Phase	Semifinals	9 September 2022		JSA Setia Arena, Setia Alam
Knockout Phase	Third place	10 September 2022		JSA Setia Arena, Setia Alam
Knockout Phase	Final	11 September 2022		Kuala Lumpur Stadium, Cheras

== Group stage ==
=== Group A ===
Pos	Team	Pld	W	D	L	GF	GA	GD	Pts	Qualification
1	Sabah	3	2	0	1	7	3	+4	6	Advance to Knockout Stage
2	Melaka United	3	2	0	1	6	3	+3	6	Advance to Knockout Stage
3	SSM Pahang	3	2	0	1	6	4	+2	6	
4	Pulau Pinang	3	0	0	3	1	10	−9	0	

Updated to match(es) played on 8 September 2022. Source: FAM
6 September 2022
08:00 UTC+8

Pulau Pinang	1–4	SSM Pahang
Izzati Zainol 65'		Nuwairah Mahadzir 25'; Kaseh Carlmila 48'; Ain Nur Qaseh 52'; Zarith Sofea 82'

JSA Setia Arena A, Setia Alam, Shah Alam, Selangor
6 September 2022
16:00 UTC+8

Sabah	3–1	Melaka United
Eslilah Esar 5'; Usliza Usman 13', 21'		Lovelytha Jelus 64' (pen.)

JSA Setia Arena A, Setia Alam, Shah Alam, Selangor

7 September 2022
08:00 UTC+8

Pulau Pinang	0–4	Sabah
		Azzlyeanieh Kunuli 52'; Ainie Tulis 55' (pen.), 57'; Usliza Usman 90'

JSA Setia Arena A, Setia Alam, Shah Alam, Selangor
7 September 2022
16:00 UTC+8

SSM Pahang	0–3	Melaka United
		Steffi Sarge Kaur 5' (pen.); Jaciah Jumilis 50'; Nurhaniza Sa'arani 87'

JSA Setia Arena A, Setia Alam, Shah Alam, Selangor

8 September 2022
08:00 UTC+8

SSM Pahang	2–0	Sabah
Ain Nur Qaseh 49' (pen.); Nuwairah Mahadzir 66'

JSA Setia Arena A, Setia Alam, Shah Alam, Selangor
6 September 2022
16:00 UTC+8

Melaka United	2–0	Pulau Pinang
Nurhaniza Sa'arani 42'; Jaciah Jumilis 90+4'

JSA Setia Arena A, Setia Alam, Shah Alam, Selangor

=== Group B ===
Pos	Team	Pld	W	D	L	GF	GA	GD	Pts	Qualification
1	Selangor	3	3	0	0	16	3	+13	9	Advance to Knockout Stage
2	Negeri Sembilan	3	2	0	1	14	2	+12	6	Advance to Knockout Stage
3	Sarawak	3	1	0	2	4	14	−10	3	
4	Kelantan	3	0	0	3	4	19	−15	0	

Updated to match(es) played on 8 September 2022. Source: FAM
6 September 2022
08:00 UTC+8

Negeri Sembilan	7–0	Sarawak United
Henrietta Justine 7', 60', 83'; Malini Nordin 31'; Ayuna Anjani 39'; Keroline Raymond 73'; Iv Alleyshiela 90+4'

JSA Setia Arena B, Setia Alam, Shah Alam, Selangor
6 September 2022
16:00 UTC+8

Selangor	9–2	Kelantan
Nur Syafiqah 5'; Hanis Farhana 14', 36'; Mecca Rania 17' (pen.), 39', 54'; Hanani Adriana 50'; Kanchejeet Kaur 58' (pen.); Nurfazira Sani 72'		Ainin Sofiya 69' (o.g.); Nurul Zahirah 85'

JSA Setia Arena B, Setia Alam, Shah Alam, Selangor

7 September 2022
08:00 UTC+8

Negeri Sembilan	1–2	Selangor
Henrietta Justine 18'		Mecca Rania 7'; Hanis Farhana 24'

JSA Setia Arena B, Setia Alam, Shah Alam, Selangor
7 September 2022
16:00 UTC+8

Sarawak	4–2	Kelantan
Nursalina Bel 27', 54'; Norfazlena Jek 47'; Rabihah Bishriyah 77'		Siti Nor Eliza 62'; Nurul Zahirah 65'

JSA Setia Arena B, Setia Alam, Shah Alam, Selangor

8 September 2022
08:00 UTC+8

Sarawak	0–5	Selangor
		Mecca Rania 24' (pen.); Felicia Adele 66'; Dian Aqilah 75', 78', 81'

JSA Setia Arena B, Setia Alam, Shah Alam, Selangor
8 September 2022
16:00 UTC+8

Kelantan	0–6	Negeri Sembilan
		Henrietta Justine 13', 45', 70'; Siti Niena 32'; Ayuna Anjani 43'; Aina Suraya 63'

JSA Setia Arena B, Setia Alam, Shah Alam, Selangor

== Knockout stage ==
=== Bracket ===
Semifinals
A1	Sabah	0(1)
B2	Negeri Sembilan	0(3)
B1	Selangor	0
A2	Melaka United	1

Finals
Negeri Sembilan	0
Melaka United	1
Third place
Sabah	1
Selangor	0

=== Semifinals ===
9 September 2022
16:00 UTC+8

Sabah	0–0 (a.e.t.)	Negeri Sembilan
Penalties
	1–3

JSA Setia Arena, Setia Alam, Shah Alam, Selangor
9 September 2022
16:00 UTC+8

Selangor	0–1	Melaka United
		Steffi Sarge Kaur 50'

JSA Setia Arena, Setia Alam, Shah Alam, Selangor

=== Third place ===
10 September 2022
16:00 UTC+8

Sabah	1–0	Selangor
Azzlyeanieh Kunuli 69'

JSA Setia Arena, Setia Alam, Shah Alam, Selangor

=== Final ===
11 September 2022
20:45 UTC+8

Negeri Sembilan	0–1	Melaka United
		Fatin Shahida 115'

Kuala Lumpur Stadium, Cheras, Kuala Lumpur

== Season statistics ==
=== Top goalscorers ===
As of matches played 11 September 2022

Rank	Player	Club	Goals
1	Henrietta Justine	Negeri Sembilan	7
2	Mecca Rania	Selangor	5
3	Usliza Usman	Sabah	3
3	Dian Aqilah	Selangor	3
3	Hanis Farhana	Selangor	3

=== Hat-tricks ===
As of matches played 11 September 2022

Player	For	Against	Result	Date
Henrietta Justine	Negeri Sembilan	Sarawak United	7–0 (H)	6 September 2022
Mecca Rania	Selangor	Kelantan	9–2 (H)	6 September 2022
Dian Aqilah	Selangor	Sarawak United	0–5 (A)	8 September 2022
Henrietta Justine	Negeri Sembilan	Kelantan	0–6 (A)	8 September 2022
