= Malaysia national football team results (2010–2019) =

Malaysia football team results

This article provides details of international football games played by the Malaysia national football team from 2010 to 2019.

== Results ==
Key
Win
Draw
Defeat

=== 2010 ===
6 January 2010 2011 AFC Asian Cup qualification	United Arab Emirates	1–0	Malaysia	Dubai, United Arab Emirates
19:00 UTC+4	A. Khalil 90+3'			Stadium: Maktoum bin Rashid Al Maktoum Stadium; Attendance: 3,500; Referee: Mohsen Basma (Syria)

27 February 2010 Friendly	Malaysia	1–0	Yemen	Kuala Lumpur, Malaysia
	Baddrol 55'	Report		Stadium: Stadium Nasional Bukit Jalil

31 August 2010 Unofficial Friendly^{1}	El Jaish SC (Qatar)	2–1	Malaysia	Al Wakrah, Qatar
			Fakri 46'	Stadium: Al-Wakrah Stadium

3 September 2010 Friendly	Oman	3–0	Malaysia	Al Wakrah, Qatar
	Rabia 3'; Al-Hosni 38', 44'			Stadium: Al-Wakrah Stadium

26 November 2010 Unofficial Friendly^{1}	Malaysia	2–3	Selangor FA	Kelana Jaya, Selangor, Malaysia
	Faizal 59'; K. Gurusamy 70'			Stadium: MBPJ Stadium

1 December 2010 2010 AFF Championship (GS)	Indonesia	5–1	Malaysia	Jakarta, Indonesia
19:30 UTC+7	Asraruddin 22' (o.g.); Gonzáles 33'; Ridwan 52'; Arif 76'; Irfan 90+4'	Report	Norshahrul 18'	Stadium: Gelora Bung Karno Stadium; Attendance: 62,000; Referee: Vo Minh Tri (Vietnam)

4 December 2010 2010 AFF Championship (GS)	Thailand	0–0	Malaysia	Jakarta, Indonesia
17:00 UTC+7		Report		Stadium: Gelora Bung Karno Stadium; Referee: Sgt. Win Cho (Myanmar)

7 December 2010 2010 AFF Championship (GS)	Malaysia	5–1	Laos	Palembang, Indonesia
19:30 UTC+7	Amri 4', 41'; Amirul 74'; Norshahrul 77'; Mahali 90+3'	Report	Singto 8'	Stadium: Gelora Sriwijaya Stadium; Referee: Vo Minh Tri (Vietnam)

12 December 2010 Unofficial Friendly^{1}	Malaysia	2–0	Kuala Lumpur FA	Cheras, Kuala Lumpur, Malaysia
	Amri 23'; Muhymeen 40' (pen.)			Stadium: Kuala Lumpur Stadium

15 December 2010 2010 AFF Championship (SF Leg 1)	Malaysia	2–0	Vietnam	Kuala Lumpur, Malaysia
20:00 UTC+8	Safee 60', 79'	Report		Stadium: Bukit Jalil National Stadium; Attendance: 45,000; Referee: Sun Baojie (China PR)

18 December 2010 2010 AFF Championship (SF Leg 2)	Vietnam	0–0	Malaysia	Hanoi, Vietnam
19:00 UTC+7		Report		Stadium: Mỹ Đình National Stadium; Attendance: 40,000; Referee: Kim Sang-Woo (Korea Republic)

22 December 2010 Unofficial Friendly^{1}	Malaysia	2–0	(Pahang) Felda United FC	Kelana Jaya, Selangor, Malaysia
	Ashaari 55'; Safee 89'			Stadium: Wisma FAM

26 December 2010 2010 AFF Championship (Final Leg 1)	Malaysia	3–0	Indonesia	Kuala Lumpur, Malaysia
20:00 UTC+8	Safee 61', 73'; Ashaari 68'	Report		Stadium: Bukit Jalil National Stadium; Attendance: 98,543; Referee: Masaaki Toma (Japan)

29 December 2010 2010 AFF Championship (Final Leg 2)	Indonesia	2–1	Malaysia	Jakarta, Indonesia
19:00 UTC+7	Nasuha 72'; Ridwan 87'	Report	Safee 54'	Stadium: Gelora Bung Karno Stadium; Attendance: 88,000; Referee: Peter Green (Australia)

=== 2011 ===
9 February 2011 Friendly	Malaysia	2–0	Hong Kong	Kuala Lumpur, Malaysia
20:45 UTC+8	Safiq 44'; Amirul 90+1'	Report		Stadium: Shah Alam Stadium

26 March 2011 Unofficial friendly^{1}	Étoile FC (Singapore)	1–1	Malaysia	Kallang, Singapore
	Hicham 61'		Fakri 46'	Stadium: Jalan Besar Stadium

3 June 2011 Friendly	Hong Kong	1–1	Malaysia	Siu Sai Wan, Hong Kong Island, Hong Kong
20:00 UTC+8	Chan Siu Ki 60'		Abdul Hadi 66'	Stadium: Siu Sai Wan Sports Ground; Attendance: 586

18 June 2011 Friendly	Malaysia	2–0	Myanmar	Kota Bharu, Kelantan, Malaysia
	Amirul Hadi 28'; Baddrol 54'			Stadium: Sultan Mohammad IV Stadium

24 June 2011 Unofficial friendly^{1}	Malaysia	3 – 1	(Malaysia) Harimau Muda A	Kelana Jaya, Selangor, Malaysia
	Baddrol 3'; Fakri 72'; K. Sasi Kumar 84'			Stadium: MBPJ Stadium

29 June 2011 World Cup 2014 Q – AFC 1st Round	Malaysia	2–1	Chinese Taipei	Kuala Lumpur, Malaysia
20:45 UTC+08:00	Safiq 29'; Aidil 54'		Chen Po-liang 76'	Stadium: Bukit Jalil National Stadium; Attendance: 45,000; Referee: Chaiya Mahapab (Thailand)

3 July 2011 World Cup 2014 Q – AFC 1st Round	Chinese Taipei	3–2	Malaysia	Taipei, Taiwan
19:00 UTC+08:00	Chang Han 31'; Chen Po-liang 44' (pen.); X. Chen 75' (pen.)		Aidil 8'; Safiq 40'	Stadium: Municipal Stadium; Attendance: 16,768; Referee: Vo Minh Tri (Vietnam)

13 July 2011 Unofficial friendly^{1} ^{XI}	Malaysia	0–4	(England) Arsenal	Kuala Lumpur, Malaysia
			Ramsey 5' (pen.); Walcott 37'; Vela 58'; Rosicky 90'	Stadium: Bukit Jalil National Stadium

16 July 2011 Unofficial friendly^{1} ^{XI}	Malaysia	3–6	(England) Liverpool	Kuala Lumpur, Malaysia
	Safiq 44'; Safee 79', 82'		Adam 26' (pen.); Ngog 69', 70'; Rodríguez 75', 89'; Kuyt 90'	Stadium: Bukit Jalil National Stadium

21 July 2011 Unofficial friendly^{1} ^{XI}	Malaysia	0–1	(England) Chelsea	Kuala Lumpur, Malaysia
			Drogba 79'	Stadium: Bukit Jalil National Stadium

23 July 2011 2014 World Cup Q – AFC 2nd Round	Singapore	5–3	Malaysia	Kallang, Singapore
19:30 UTC+4:00	Đurić 8'; Qiu Li 22'; Mustafic 44'; Jiayi 45'; Đurić 81'		Safee 1', 71'; Abdul Hadi 70'	Stadium: Jalan Besar Stadium

28 July 2011 2014 World Cup Q – AFC 2nd Round	Malaysia	1–1	Singapore	Kuala Lumpur, Malaysia
20:40 UTC+4:00	Jiayi 72'		Safee Sali 54'	Stadium: Bukit Jalil National Stadium; Attendance: 87,000

6 August 2011 Unofficial friendly^{1}	Malaysia	0–1	Selangor FA	Selangor, Malaysia
				Stadium: Shah Alam Stadium

2 October 2011 Unofficial friendly^{1}	Malaysia	3–0	Malaysia U-23	Kelana Jaya, Selangor, Malaysia
	Norshahrul 36'; Baddrol 48'; Shahrizal 88'			Stadium: Wisma FAM

7 October 2011 Friendly	Australia	5–0	Malaysia	Canberra, Australia
19:30 UTC+11	Wilkshire 2'; Kennedy 32', 45'; Brosque 38', 68'	Report		Stadium: Canberra Stadium; Attendance: 24,732; Referee: Paul Cetrangolo (Australia)

8 November 2011 Unofficial friendly^{1}	Negeri Sembilan FA	0–2	Malaysia	Paroi, Negeri Sembilan, Malaysia
			Safiq 40' (pen.); Shahrizal 91'	Stadium: Tuanku Abdul Rahman Stadium

13 November 2011 Friendly	India	1–1	Malaysia	Guwahati, India
	Nabi 88'	Report	Safiq 42'	Stadium: Indira Gandhi Athletic Stadium; Attendance: 20,000

16 November 2011 Friendly	India	3–2	Malaysia	Kolkata, India
	Chhetri 39', 53'; Lalpekhlua 47'	Report	Safee 45', 60'	Stadium: Salt Lake Stadium

=== 2012 ===
1 February 2012 Unofficial friendly^{1}	Malaysia	5–0	Kelantan FA	Kuala Lumpur, Malaysia
	Asraruddin 36'; Shahurain 42'; S. Kunanlan 65'; Abdul Hadi 78'; Izuan 90'	Report		Stadium: National Stadium, Bukit Jalil; Attendance: 30,000

24 February 2012 Unofficial friendly^{1}	Sabah FA	0–1	Malaysia	Kota Kinabalu, Sabah, Malaysia
		Report	Amar 79'	Stadium: Likas Stadium; Attendance: 35,000

29 February 2012 Friendly	Philippines	1–1	Malaysia	Manila, Philippines
	Wolf 34'	Report	Shakir 90+1'	Stadium: Rizal Memorial Stadium; Attendance: 11,000

24 March 2012 Unofficial friendly^{1}	Sarawak FA	1–1	Malaysia	Kuching, Sarawak, Malaysia
	Joël 68'	Report	Venice 65'	Stadium: Sarawak State Stadium

28 April 2012 Friendly	Malaysia	6–0	Sri Lanka	Shah Alam, Selangor, Malaysia
	Wan Zack Haikal 25', 26'; Hazwan 73', 83', 90'; Azamuddin 86'	Report		Stadium: Shah Alam Stadium; Attendance: 10,000

28 May 2012 Unofficial friendly^{1}	Malaysia	2–1	(Pahang) Felda United FC	Kelana Jaya, Kuala Lumpur, Malaysia
	Shahurain 14'; Amar 70'	Report	Abdul Ghani 88'	Stadium: Wisma FAM; Attendance: 30

1 June 2012 Friendly	Malaysia	0–0	Philippines	Shah Alam, Selangor, Malaysia
		Report		Stadium: Shah Alam Stadium; Attendance: 10,000

8 June 2012 Friendly	Singapore	2–2	Malaysia	Kallang, Singapore
	Shahdan 87'; Qiu Li 90+3'	Report	Azamuddin 43'; Safiq 60'	Stadium: Jalan Besar Stadium; Referee: Ng Kai Lam (Hong Kong)

12 June 2012 Friendly	Malaysia	2–0	Singapore	Shah Alam, Selangor, Malaysia
	Shakir 19'; Safiq 61'	Report		Stadium: Shah Alam Stadium; Referee: Teetichai Nualjan (Thailand)

24 July 2012 Unofficial friendly^{1} ^{XI}	Arsenal (England)	2–1	Malaysia	Kuala Lumpur, Malaysia
21:45 UTC+08:00	Eisfield 87'; Aneke 90'	Report	Azmi 45+2'	Stadium: Bukit Jalil National Stadium

27 July 2012 Unofficial friendly^{1} ^{XI}	Indonesia U-23	0–6	Malaysia	Jakarta, Indonesia
21:00 UTC+07:00			Hazwan 11'; Kubala 13' (pen.); Azrif 31'; Amri 34', 45'; Shukor 62'	Stadium: Gelora Bung Karno Stadium; Attendance: 0

30 July 2012 Unofficial friendly^{1} ^{XI}	Manchester City (England)	3–1	Malaysia	Kuala Lumpur, Malaysia
21:45 UTC+08:00	Agüero 17'; Tevez 48'; Johnson 52'	Report	Azamuddin 87'	Stadium: Bukit Jalil National Stadium

11 September 2012 Friendly	Malaysia	0–2	Vietnam	Shah Alam, Selangor, Malaysia
		Report	Lê Công Vinh 32'; Phan Thanh Hung 48'	Stadium: Shah Alam Stadium; Attendance: 15,000; Referee: Mohd Yussof Mat Karim (Malaysia)

20 September 2012 Friendly^{1}	Malaysia	3–0	Cambodia	Kelana Jaya, Selangor, Malaysia
	Safee Sali 51'; Zaquan Adha 62', 76'	Report		Stadium: Wisma FAM

12 October 2012 Unofficial friendly^{1}	Malaysia	6–0	(Kuala Lumpur) PDRM FA	Kelana Jaya, Selangor, Malaysia
	Safee 7', 56'; Wan Zack Haikal 28', 41'; Kunalan 72'; Azamuddin 88'	Report		Stadium: Wisma FAM; Attendance: 30

16 October 2012 Friendly	Hong Kong	0–3	Malaysia	Mong Kok, Hong Kong
		Report	Safee 59'; Safiq 82'; Fakri 90+2'	Stadium: Mong Kok Stadium

30 October 2012 Unofficial friendly^{1}	Malaysia	4–0	(Kuala Lumpur) PDRM FA	Kelana Jaya, Selangor, Malaysia
	Safee 30'; Safiq 45' (pen.), 86'; Wan Zack Haikal 63'	Report		Stadium: Wisma FAM

3 November 2012 Friendly	Vietnam	1–0	Malaysia	Hanoi, Vietnam
	Nguyen Trong Hoang 74'	Report		Stadium: Mỹ Đình National Stadium

7 November 2012 Friendly	Thailand	2–0	Malaysia	Nonthaburi, Thailand
	Prayad Boonya 26'; Arthit Sunthornpit 81'			Stadium: SCG Stadium; Referee: Chaiya Mahapab (Thailand)

14 November 2012 Friendly	Malaysia	1–1	Hong Kong	Shah Alam, Selangor, Malaysia
20:45	Safee 58'		Lam Hok Hei 88'	Stadium: Shah Alam Stadium; Referee: Suhaizi Shukri (Malaysia)

20 November 2012 Friendly	Malaysia	1–1	Bangladesh	Kuala Lumpur, Malaysia
20:45	Khyril 22'	Report	Ameli 83' (pen.)	Stadium: National Stadium, Bukit Jalil

25 November 2012 2012 AFF Suzuki Cup (GS)	Malaysia	0–3	Singapore	Kuala Lumpur, Malaysia
20:00 UTC+8		Report	Shahril 32', 38'; Đurić 75'	Stadium: National Stadium, Bukit Jalil; Referee: Valentin Kovalenko (Uzbekistan)

28 November 2012 2012 AFF Suzuki Cup (GS)	Laos	1–4	Malaysia	Kuala Lumpur, Malaysia
20:00 UTC+8	Sihavong 38'	Report	Safiq 15'; Safee 67'; Wan 76'; Khyril 80'	Stadium: National Stadium, Bukit Jalil; Referee: Fan Qi (China PR)

1 December 2012 2012 AFF Suzuki Cup (GS)	Malaysia	2–0	Indonesia	Kuala Lumpur, Malaysia
20:00 UTC+8	Azamuddin 27'; Mahali 30'	Report		Stadium: National Stadium, Bukit Jalil; Referee: Valentin Kovalenko (Uzbekistan)

9 December 2012 2012 AFF Suzuki Cup (SF Leg 1)	Malaysia	1–1	Thailand	Kuala Lumpur, Malaysia
19:00 UTC+7	Norshahrul 48'	Report	Teerasil 78'	Stadium: National Stadium, Bukit Jalil; Referee: Mohsen Torky (Iran)

13 December 2012 2012 AFF Suzuki Cup (SF Leg 2)	Thailand	2–0	Malaysia	Bangkok, Thailand
19:00 UTC+7	Teerasil 60'; Theeraton 65'	Report		Stadium: Supachalasai Stadium; Referee: Lee Min-Hu (South Korea)

=== 2013 ===
1 February 2013 Friendly^{1}	Iraq	3–0	Malaysia	Ajman, UAE
	Nadhim 14'; Abdul-Raheem 37', 67'			Stadium: Al-Rashid Stadium

6 February 2013 2015 AFC Asian Cup qualification	Qatar	2–0	Malaysia	Doha, Qatar
	Ibrahim 55'; Ahmed 90+3'	Report		Stadium: Jassim Bin Hamad Stadium; Attendance: 7,320; Referee: Alireza Faghani (Iran)

17 March 2013 Friendly^{1}	Malaysia	1–4	Saudi Arabia	Shah Alam, Selangor, Malaysia
20:45 UTC+8	Safiq 70'	Report	Al-Salem 7'; Al-Shehri 30'; Hazazi 89'; Al-Hamdan 90'	Stadium: Shah Alam Stadium

22 March 2013 2015 AFC Asian Cup qualification	Malaysia	2–1	Yemen	Shah Alam, Selangor, Malaysia
20:45 UTC+8	Azamuddin 27'; Khyril Muhymeen 80'	Report	Al-Hagri 12'	Stadium: Shah Alam Stadium; Attendance: 80,000; Referee: Peter Green (Australia)

26 March 2013 Friendly^{1}	Malaysia	0–2	Palestine	Kuantan, Pahang, Malaysia
13:00 UTC+8		Report	Khaled Jamal Salem 40'; Ashraf Numan 90'	Stadium: Darul Makmur Stadium

6 June 2013 Unofficial friendly^{1}	Canberra XI (Australia)	3 – 2	Malaysia	Canberra, Australia
	Alex Oloriegbe 28'; Ryan Keir 34'; Philippe Bernabo 90' (pen.)	Report	Safee 61', 83'	Stadium: Deakin Stadium

11 June 2013 Unofficial friendly^{1}	Sydney Olympic (Australia)	0 – 4	Malaysia	Sydney, Australia
		Report	Safiq 9'; Amri 50', 73', 90'	Stadium: Belmore Sports Ground

13 June 2013 Unofficial friendly^{1}	Marconi Stallions (Australia)	2 – 0	Malaysia	Sydney, Australia
	Milorad Simonovic 42'; Tadgh Purcell 45'	Report		Stadium: Marconi Stadium

16 July 2013 Unofficial friendly^{1}	Malaysia	0 – 0	(Thailand) Chonburi FC	Kuala Lumpur, Malaysia
		Report		Stadium: National Stadium, Bukit Jalil

21 July 2013 Unofficial friendly^{1} ^{XI}	Malaysia	1 – 4	(England) Chelsea	Shah Alam, Selangor, Malaysia
	Fadhli 90+1'	Report	Traore 45'; De Bruyne 45'; Lukaku 45'; Moses 45'	Stadium: Shah Alam Stadium

25 July 2013 Unofficial friendly^{1} ^{XI}	Shimizu S-Pulse (Japan)	2 – 0	Malaysia	Shizuoka, Japan
		Report		Stadium: Miho Ground

27 July 2013 Unofficial friendly^{1} ^{XI}	Shonan Bellmare (Japan)	5 – 0	Malaysia	Hiratsuka, Japan
		Report		Stadium: Banyu Artificial Turf Soccer Field

31 July 2013 Unofficial friendly^{1} ^{XI}	Tokyo Verdy (Japan)	5 – 0	Malaysia	Tama, Tokyo, Japan
		Report		Stadium: Tama City Athletic Stadium

10 August 2013 Unofficial friendly^{1} ^{XI}	Malaysia	1 – 3	(Spain) Barcelona	Shah Alam, Selangor, Malaysia
	Amri 39'	Report	Fàbregas 31'; Neymar 42'; Piqué 74'	Stadium: Shah Alam Stadium

10 September 2013 Friendly	China	2 – 0	Malaysia	Tianjin, China
	Zheng Long 43'; Zhao Xuri 57'	Report		Stadium: Tianjin Olympic Centre Stadium; Referee: Masaaki Iemoto (Japan)

9 October 2013 Friendly^{1}	United Arab Emirates	3 – 1	Malaysia	Guangdong, China
		Report	Safiq (?)	Stadium: Shenzhen Bay Sports Center

15 October 2013 2015 AFC Asian Cup qualification	Malaysia	1 – 1	Bahrain	Shah Alam, Selangor, Malaysia
20:45 UTC+8	Norshahrul 70'	Report	Saleh 45+1'	Stadium: Shah Alam Stadium; Attendance: 6,500; Referee: Ryuji Sato (Japan)

8 November 2013 Friendly	Kuwait	3 – 0	Malaysia	Adiliya, Kuwait City, Kuwait
	Al Rashidi Ahmad 6'; Saif Al Hashan 34'; Khaled Ajab 53'	Report		Stadium: Al-Sadaqua Walsalam Stadium

15 November 2013 2015 AFC Asian Cup qualification	Bahrain	1 – 0	Malaysia	Riffa, Bahrain
17:45 UTC+3	Abdul-Latif 72'	Report		Stadium: Bahrain National Stadium; Attendance: 2,000; Referee: Mohsen Torky (Iran)

19 November 2013 2015 AFC Asian Cup qualification	Malaysia	0 – 1	Qatar	Shah Alam, Selangor, Malaysia
20:45 UTC+8		Report	Al-Ali 65'	Stadium: Shah Alam Stadium; Attendance: 4,079; Referee: Kim Sang-Woo (South Korea)

=== 2014 ===
1 March 2014 Friendly	Malaysia	0–0	Philippines	Selayang, Malaysia
20:45 (UTC+8)		Report		Stadium: Selayang Stadium; Referee: Mohd Amirul Izwan Yaacob (Malaysia)

5 March 2014 2015 AFC Asian Cup qualification	Yemen	1–2	Malaysia	Al Ain (United Arab Emirates) (Note: Yemen played their home matches outside the country due to security concerns.)
18:00 UTC+4	Al-Sarori 60'	Report	Amri 16'; Fakri 77'	Stadium: Tahnoun bin Mohammed Stadium; Attendance: 311; Referee: Valentin Kovalenko (Uzbekistan)

27 April 2014 Friendly	Philippines	0–0	Malaysia	Cebu, Philippines
20:45 (UTC+8)		Report		Stadium: Cebu City Sports Center; Referee: Thorik Alkatiri (Indonesia)

8 August 2014 Friendly	Tajikistan	4 – 1	Malaysia	Dushanbe, Tajikistan
18:00 TJT (UTC+5)	D.Ergashev 16'; Rabimov 38'; Fatkhuloev 53'; Davronov 54'	Report	Yahyah 43' (pen.)	Stadium: Pamir Stadium

14 September 2014 Friendly	Indonesia	2–0	Malaysia	Sidoarjo, Indonesia
17:00 UTC+7	Muslim 64' (o.g.); Samsul 88'	Report		Stadium: Gelora Delta Stadium; Referee: Muhammad Taqi Aljaafari Bin Jahari (Singapore)

20 September 2014 Friendly	Malaysia	4–1	Cambodia	Shah Alam, Selangor, Malaysia
UTC+7	Kalang Tie 8', 65'; Daravorn 15' (o.g.); Baddrol 82'	Report	Chanrasmey 80'	Stadium: Shah Alam Stadium

12 November 2014 Friendly	Malaysia	0–3	Syria	Shah Alam, Selangor, Malaysia
		Report	Nadim Sabag 4'; Sanharib 47'; Omar Khrbin 66'	Stadium: Shah Alam Stadium

16 November 2014 Friendly	Vietnam	3–1	Malaysia	Hanoi, Vietnam
	Mạc Hồng Quân 47'; Nguyễn Văn Quyết 57'; Ngô Hoàng Thịnh 81'		Amri 22'	Stadium: Mỹ Đình National Stadium

23 November 2014 2014 AFF Championship (GS)	Malaysia	0–0	Myanmar	Kallang, Singapore
18:00 UTC+8		Report		Stadium: Jalan Besar Stadium; Referee: Çarymyrat Kurbanow (Turkmenistan)

26 November 2014 2014 AFF Championship (GS)	Malaysia	2–3	Thailand	Kallang, Singapore
19:30 UTC+8	Amri 28'; Safiq 61'	Report	Adisak 43', 90'; Charyl 72'	Stadium: National Stadium, Singapore; Referee: Ahmed Al-Kaf (Oman)

29 November 2014 2014 AFF Championship (GS)	Singapore	1–3	Malaysia	Kallang, Singapore
20:00 UTC+8	Amri 83'	Report	Safee 61'; Safiq 90+3' (pen.); Putra 90+5'	Stadium: National Stadium, Singapore; Referee: Ahmed Al-Kaf (Oman)

7 December 2014 2014 AFF Championship (SF Leg 1)	Vietnam	1–2	Malaysia	Shah Alam, Selangor, Malaysia
20:00 UTC+8	Safiq 14' (pen.)	Report	Võ Huy Toàn 32'; Nguyễn Văn Quyết 60'	Stadium: Shah Alam Stadium; Referee: Ma Ning (China)

11 December 2014 2014 AFF Championship (SF Leg 2)	Vietnam	2–4	Malaysia	Hanoi, Vietnam
19:00 UTC+7	Lê Công Vinh 22' (pen.), 79'	Report	Safiq 4' (pen.); Norshahrul 16'; Đinh Tiến Thành 29' (o.g.); Shukor 43'	Stadium: Mỹ Đình National Stadium; Referee: Masaaki Toma (Japan)

17 December 2014 2014 AFF Championship (F Leg 1)	Thailand	2–0	Malaysia	Bangkok, Thailand
19:00 UTC+7	Charyl 72' (pen.); Kroekrit 86'			Stadium: Rajamangala Stadium; Referee: Valentin Kovalenko (Uzbekistan)

20 December 2014 2014 AFF Championship (F Leg 2)	Malaysia	3–2	Thailand	Kuala Lumpur, Malaysia
20:00 UTC+8	Safiq 7' (pen.), 58'; Putra 45+2'		Charyl 82'; Chanathip 87'	Stadium: Bukit Jalil National Stadium; Referee: Alireza Faghani (Iran)

=== 2015 ===
26 March 2015 Friendly	Oman	6–0	Malaysia	Seeb, Oman
	Al-Qasmi 15', 67'; Al-Muqbali 42' (pen.), 51'; Qasim Said 47'; Al-Khaldi 89' (pen.)	Report		Stadium: Al-Seeb Stadium

27 May 2015 Friendly^{1} ^{XI}	Malaysia XI	1–2	(England) Tottenham Hotspur	Shah Alam, Selangor, Malaysia
20:45 UTC+8	Thiago Junior	Report	Harry Kane 19', 43'	Stadium: Shah Alam Stadium

6 June 2015 Friendly	Hong Kong	0–0	Malaysia	Shah Alam, Selangor, Malaysia
20:45 UTC+8				Stadium: Shah Alam Stadium

11 June 2015 2018 World Cup QC – AFC 2nd Round	Malaysia	1–1	Timor-Leste	Kuala Lumpur, Malaysia
20:45 UTC+8	Safee 34'	Report (FIFA); Report (AFC)	Saro 90+3'	Stadium: Bukit Jalil National Stadium; Attendance: 5,000; Referee: Jarred Gillett (Australia)

16 June 2015 2018 World Cup QC – AFC 2nd Round	Malaysia	0–6	Palestine	Kuala Lumpur, Malaysia
20:45 UTC+8		Report (FIFA); Report (AFC)	Al-Batat 9'; Maraaba 23', 75'; Seyam 41', 85'; Yousef 63'	Stadium: Bukit Jalil National Stadium; Referee: Kim Sang-woo (South Korea)

24 July 2015 Friendly^{1} ^{XI}	Malaysia XI	1-1	(England) Liverpool	Kuala Lumpur, Malaysia
20:45 UTC+8	Patrick 13'	Report	Ibe 28'	Stadium: Bukit Jalil National Stadium

29 August 2015 Friendly	Malaysia	0–0	Bangladesh	Shah Alam, Selangor, Malaysia
				Stadium: Shah Alam Stadium

3 September 2015 2018 World Cup QC – AFC 2nd Round	United Arab Emirates	10–0	Malaysia	Abu Dhabi, United Arab Emirates
19:15 UTC+4	Salem 16'; Mabkhout 22', 33', 76'; Khalil 24', 29', 70', 78'; Fardan 25'; Ahmed 37'	Report (FIFA); Report (AFC)		Stadium: Mohammed Bin Zayed Stadium; Attendance: 7,822; Referee: Abdulrahman Al-Jassim (Qatar)

8 September 2015 2018 World Cup QC – AFC 2nd Round	Malaysia	0–3; Awarded (Note: The match between Malaysia and Saudi Arabia was abandoned during the 87th minute after a group of supporters threw objects onto the pitch. At the time of the abandonment the score was 2–1 to Saudi Arabia. On 5 October 2015, FIFA decided that the match should be declared as lost by forfeit by Malaysia (0–3). Malaysia must also play their next home match against the United Arab Emirates without spectators.)	Saudi Arabia	Shah Alam, Selangor, Malaysia
20:45 UTC+8	Safiq 70'	Report (FIFA); Report (AFC)	Al-Jassim 73'; Al-Sahlawi 76'	Stadium: Shah Alam Stadium; Attendance: 10,000; Referee: Liu Kwok Man (Hong Kong)

8 October 2015 Friendly	Laos	1–3	Malaysia	Bangkok, Thailand
	Khanthavong 82'		Christie 50', 90'; Azamuddin 53'	Stadium: Thai Army Sports Stadium

13 October 2015 2018 World Cup QC – AFC 2nd Round	Timor-Leste	0–1	Malaysia	Dili, Timor-Leste
16:00 UTC+9		Report (FIFA); Report (AFC)	Amri 10'	Stadium: Dili Municipal Stadium; Attendance: 2,500; Referee: Kim Hee-Gon (South Korea)

12 November 2015 2018 World Cup QC – AFC 2nd Round	Palestine	6–0	Malaysia	Amman, Jordan
16:00 UTC+2	Zorrilla 37'; Abu Nahyeh 38', 45', 58'; Seyam 88'; Ihbeisheh 90+1'	Report (FIFA); Report (AFC)		Stadium: Amman International Stadium; Attendance: 9,772; Referee: Ahmed Al-Kaf (Oman)

17 November 2015 2018 World Cup QC – AFC 2nd Round	Malaysia	1–2	United Arab Emirates	Shah Alam, Selangor, Malaysia
20:45 UTC+8	Baddrol 59'	Report (FIFA); Report (AFC)	O. Abdulrahman 22'; Khalil 52'	Stadium: Shah Alam Stadium; Attendance: 0 Referee: Masaaki Toma (Japan)

=== 2016 ===
24 March 2016 2018 World Cup QC – AFC 2nd Round	Saudi Arabia	2–0	Malaysia	Jeddah, Saudi Arabia
20:30 UTC+3	Al-Sahlawi 50'; Al-Jassim 74'	Report (FIFA); Report (AFC)		Stadium: King Abdullah Sports City; Attendance: 34,839; Referee: Kim Dong-jin (South Korea)

29 March 2016 Friendly	Malaysia	0–0	Macau	Malacca City, Malaysia
20:45 UTC+8				Stadium: Hang Jebat Stadium

2 June 2016 2019 Asian Cup – Play-off	Malaysia	3–0	Timor-Leste	Johor Bahru, Johor Malaysia
21:00UTC+8	Hazwan 16', 21'; Amri 85'	Report		Stadium: Tan Sri Dato Haji Hassan Yunos Stadium; Attendance: 3,600; Referee: Hiroyuki Kimura (Japan)

7 June 2016 2019 Asian Cup – Play-off	Timor-Leste	0–3	Malaysia	Johor Bahru, Johor Malaysia
21:00 UTC+8		Report	Khair 16'; Hazwan 58'; S. Chanturu 68'	Stadium: Tan Sri Dato Haji Hassan Yunos Stadium (Note: Timor-Leste played their home match in Malaysia.); Attendance: 1,145; Referee: Ho Wai Sing (Hong Kong)

17 June 2016 Friendly	Papua New Guinea	2–0	Malaysia	Port Moresby, Papua New Guinea
19:00 UTC+10	Semmy 35', 42'	Report (FAM); Report (goal.com)		Stadium: Sir John Guise Stadium; Referee: George Time (Solomon Islands)

22 June 2016 Friendly	New Caledonia	1–2	Malaysia	Nouméa, New Caledonia
19:15 UTC+11	Saïko 20'	Report (FAM); Report (goal.com)	Amirul 48'; Baddrol 54'	Stadium: Stade Numa-Daly Magenta; Referee: Mederic Lacour (New Caledonia)

26 June 2016 Friendly	Fiji	1–1	Malaysia	Nadi, Fiji
14:00 UTC+12	Krishna 72'	Report (FAM); Report (goal.com)	Amri 41'	Stadium: Prince Charles Park; Referee: George Time (Solomon Islands)

6 September 2016 Friendly	Indonesia	3–0	Malaysia	Surabaya, Indonesia
UTC+7	Solossa 6', 21'; Irfan 11'	Report		Stadium: Gelora Bung Tomo Stadium

7 October 2016 Friendly	Singapore	0–0	Malaysia	Singapore
UTC+7		Report		Stadium: Jalan Besar Stadium

11 October 2016 Friendly	Malaysia	1–1	Afghanistan	Shah Alam, Selangor, Malaysia
UTC+8	Hadin 45+2'	Report	Noraollah Amiri 22'	Stadium: Shah Alam Stadium

14 November 2016 Friendly	Malaysia	2–1	Papua New Guinea	Shah Alam, Selangor, Malaysia
15:00 UTC+08	Hazwan 20'; Amri 46'	Report	Nigel 6'	Stadium: Shah Alam Stadium; Referee: Alongkron Feemuechang (Thailand)

20 November 2016 2016 AFF Championship (GS)	Malaysia	3–2	Cambodia	Yangon, Myanmar
15:00 UTC+06	Syazwan 37'; Amri 69', 80'	Report	Vathanaka 8', 59'	Stadium: Thuwunna YTC Stadium; Referee: Yaqoob Abdul Baki (Oman)

23 November 2016 2016 AFF Championship (GS)	Malaysia	0–1	Vietnam	Yangon, Myanmar
15:00 UTC+06		Report	Hoàng 80'	Stadium: Thuwunna Stadium; Attendance: 2,542; Referee: Charymurat Kurbanov (Turkmenistan)

26 November 2016 2016 AFF Championship (GS)	Myanmar	1–0	Malaysia	Yangon, Myanmar
18:00 UTC+06	David Htan 89'	Report		Stadium: Thuwunna Stadium; Attendance: 32,758; Referee: Yaqoob Abdul Baki (Oman)

=== 2017 ===
22 March 2017 Friendly	Philippines	0–0	Malaysia	Manila, Philippines
19:30 UTC+8				Stadium: Rizal Memorial Stadium

13 June 2017 2019 AFC Asian Cup qualification – third round	Malaysia	1–2	Lebanon	Johor Bahru, Johor, Malaysia
21:45 UTC+8	Mahali 43'	Report	Ataya 79', 90+4'	Stadium: Tan Sri Dato' Haji Hassan Yunos Stadium; Attendance: 6,850; Referee: Jameel Abdulhusin (Bahrain)

22 August 2017 Friendly	Malaysia	1–2	Syria	Malacca City, Malaysia
20:45 UTC+8	Lok 90+4' (pen.)		Marmour 83'; Muhtadi 85'	Stadium: Hang Jebat Stadium

29 August 2017 Friendly	Myanmar	1–0	Malaysia	Yangon, Myanmar
17:30 UTC+06:30	Kyaw Ko Ko 89'			Stadium: Thuwunna Stadium

5 September 2017 2019 AFC Asian Cup qualification – third round	Malaysia	1–1	Hong Kong	Malacca City, Malaysia
20:45 UTC+8	Syazwan 56'	Report	Sandro 53'	Stadium: Hang Jebat Stadium; Attendance: 3,646; Referee: Chris Beath (Australia)

10 October 2017 2019 AFC Asian Cup qualification – third round	Hong Kong	2–0	Malaysia	Hong Kong
20:00 UTC+8	Jordi 44'; McKee 49'	Report		Stadium: Hong Kong Stadium; Attendance: 7,920; Referee: Nivon Robesh Gamini (Sri Lanka)

10 November 2017 (Note: Due to the death of Kim Jong-nam that led to a diplomatic crisis between Malaysia and North Korea, the Malaysian government decided to disallow the Malaysian football team from playing in North Korea for safety reasons. On 10 March 2017, the Asian Football Confederation (AFC) announced that North Korea's home match against Malaysia, originally scheduled for 28 March at the Kim Il-sung Stadium in Pyongyang, would be postponed, with the AFC announcing on 15 March 2017 that the match would be played on 8 June. On 17 May 2017, the AFC announced that the match was postponed for a second time, to 5 October, due to "geo-political tension on the Korean Peninsula". On 28 September 2017, the AFC announced that the match was again postponed after the Malaysian government announced a travel ban on Malaysian nationals visiting North Korea. On 20 October 2017, the AFC announced that both matches between North Korea and Malaysia would be played at a neutral venue in the interests of competition fairness, with North Korea's "home" match played on 10 November 2017 and Malaysia's "home" match played on 13 November 2017.) 2019 AFC Asian Cup qualification – third round	North Korea	4–1	Malaysia	Buriram, Thailand (Note: On 15 March 2017, the AFC announced that should diplomatic relations between the two countries not return to normal, the match between North Korea and Malaysia would be played at a neutral venue, and Malaysia's home match against North Korea would also be moved to a neutral venue to preserve sporting values and the spirit of fair play. After the AFC received confirmation that Malaysians were allowed to travel to North Korea, the AFC agreed that the match would be played in Pyongyang. However, at the announcement of the second postponement, the AFC said the venue would be decided after monitoring the safety and security of the AFC Cup and AFC U-23 Championship qualifying matches taking place in North Korea in the coming months. On 20 October 2017, the AFC announced that both matches between North Korea and Malaysia would be played at a neutral venue in the interests of competition fairness, with North Korea's "home" match played on 10 November 2017 and Malaysia's "home" match played on 13 November 2017, which were later confirmed to be played at Thailand.)
20:00 UTC+7	Pak Kwang-ryong 12' (pen.); Kim Yu-song 42'; Kim Yong-il 48'; Jong Il-gwan 59'	Report	Safawi 67'	Stadium: Buriram Stadium; Attendance: 287; Referee: Fahad Al-Mirdasi (Saudi Arabia)

13 November 2017 2019 AFC Asian Cup qualification – third round	Malaysia	1–4	North Korea	Buriram, Thailand
19:00 UTC+7	Safawi 85'	Report	Kim Yu-song 15', 20', 44'; Pak Kwang-ryong 79'	Stadium: Buriram Stadium; Attendance: 504; Referee: Ahmed Al-Kaf (Oman)

=== 2018 ===
27 March 2018 2019 AFC Asian Cup qualification – third round	Lebanon	2–1	Malaysia	Beirut, Lebanon
21:45 UTC+8	Maatouk 19' (pen.); El-Helwe 90+4'	Report	Syafiq 72'	Stadium: Camille Chamoun Sports City Stadium; Attendance: 3,500; Referee: Valentin Kovalenko (Uzbekistan)

22 March 2018 Friendly	Malaysia	2–2	Mongolia	Bukit Jalil, Kuala Lumpur
20:45 UTC+8	Fadhli 32'; Akhyar 64'	Report	Purevdorj 43'; Serodyanjiv 70'	Stadium: Bukit Jalil National Stadium; Referee: Muhammad Nazmi Nasaruddin (Malaysia)

1 April 2018 Friendly	Malaysia	7–0	Bhutan	Bukit Jalil, Kuala Lumpur
20:45 UTC+8	Wan Zack 11'; Zaquan Adha 20', 37', 40', 55'; Irfan 28'; Syafiq 74'	Report		Stadium: Bukit Jalil National Stadium; Referee: Nagor Amir Noor Mohamed (Malaysia)

5 July 2018 Friendly	Malaysia	1–0	Fiji	Cheras, Kuala Lumpur
20:45 UTC+8	Syafiq 20'	Report		Stadium: Kuala Lumpur Stadium; Referee: Mongkolchai Pechsri (Thailand)

7 September 2018 Friendly	Chinese Taipei	2–0	Malaysia	Taipei, Taiwan
19:00 UTC+8	Wu Chun-ching 13'; Chu En-le 53'	Report		Stadium: Taipei Municipal Stadium; Referee: Murad Al Zawahreh (Jordan)

10 September 2018 Friendly	Cambodia	1–3	Malaysia	Phnom Penh, Cambodia
19:00 UTC+7	Visal 18'	Report	Shahrul 62'; Syazwan 74'; Shahrel 90+3'	Stadium: Phnom Penh Olympic Stadium; Referee: Nguyễn Hiền Triết (Vietnam)

12 October 2018 Friendly	Sri Lanka	1–4	Malaysia	Colombo, Sri Lanka
18:30 UTC+5:30	Madushan 29'	Report (WF)	Norshahrul 65'; Adam 76'; Yogendran Puslas 85' (o.g.); Sumareh 90+1'	Stadium: Sugathadasa Stadium; Referee: Hettikamkanamge Perera (Sri Lanka)

16 October 2018 Friendly	Malaysia	0–1	Kyrgyzstan	Malacca City, Malaysia
20:45 UTC+8		Report (WF)	Sagynbaev 68'	Stadium: Hang Jebat Stadium; Attendance: 6,196; Referee: Suhaizi Shukri (Malaysia)

3 November 2018 Friendly	Malaysia	3–0	Maldives	Kuala Lumpur, Malaysia
20:45 UTC+8	Zaquan Adha 16'; Safawi 81'; Sumareh 90+3'	Report (WF)		Stadium: Bukit Jalil National Stadium

8 November 2018 2018 AFF Championship (GS)	Cambodia	0–1	Malaysia	Phnom Penh, Cambodia
18:30 UTC+7		Report (AFFSZ); Report (AFF)	Norshahrul 30'	Stadium: Olympic Stadium; Attendance: 34,250; Referee: Ahmad A'qashah (Singapore)

12 November 2018 2018 AFF Championship (GS)	Malaysia	3–1	Laos	Kuala Lumpur, Malaysia
20:45 UTC+8	Zaquan Adha 15'; Norshahrul 86', 90+2'	Report (AFFSZ); Report (AFF)	Kongmathilath 7'	Stadium: Bukit Jalil National Stadium; Attendance: 12,127; Referee: Sivakorn Pu-udom (Thailand)

16 November 2018 2018 AFF Championship (GS)	Vietnam	2–0	Malaysia	Hanoi, Vietnam
19:30 UTC+7	Công Phượng 11'; Anh Đức 60'	Report (AFFSZ); Report (AFF)		Stadium: Mỹ Đình National Stadium; Attendance: 40,000; Referee: Turki Al-Khudayr (Saudi Arabia)

24 November 2018 2018 AFF Championship (GS)	Malaysia	3–0	Myanmar	Kuala Lumpur, Malaysia
20:30 UTC+8	Norshahrul 26'; Zaquan Adha 45+3' (pen.), 88'	Report (AFFSZ); Report (AFF)		Stadium: Bukit Jalil National Stadium; Attendance: 83,777; Referee: Alireza Faghani (Iran)

1 December 2018 2018 AFF Championship (SF Leg 1)	Malaysia	0–0	Thailand	Kuala Lumpur, Malaysia
20:45 UTC+8		Report (AFFSZ); Report (AFF)		Stadium: Bukit Jalil National Stadium; Attendance: 87,545; Referee: Ahmed Al-Kaf (Oman)

5 December 2018 2018 AFF Championship (SF Leg 2)	Thailand	2–2	Malaysia	Bangkok, Thailand
19:00 UTC+7	Irfan 21' (o.g.); Pansa 63'	Report (AFFSZ); Report (AFF)	Syahmi 28'; Norshahrul 71'	Stadium: Rajamangala Stadium; Attendance: 46,157; Referee: Adham Makhadmeh (Jordan)

11 December 2018 2018 AFF Championship (Final Leg 1)	Malaysia	2–2	Vietnam	Kuala Lumpur, Malaysia
20:45 UTC+8	Shahrul 36'; Safawi 60'	Report (AFFSZ); Report (AFF)	Nguyễn Huy Hùng 22'; Phạm Đức Huy 25'	Stadium: Bukit Jalil National Stadium; Attendance: 88,482; Referee: Chris Beath (Australia)

15 December 2018 2018 AFF Championship (Final Leg 2)	Vietnam	1–0	Malaysia	Hanoi, Vietnam
19:30 UTC+7	Nguyễn Anh Đức 6'	Report (AFFSZ); Report (AFF)		Stadium: Mỹ Đình National Stadium; Attendance: 40,000; Referee: Alireza Faghani (Iran)

=== 2019 ===
20 March 2019 2019 Airmarine Cup	Malaysia	0–1	Singapore	Kuala Lumpur, Malaysia
20:45 UTC+8		Report (WF); Report (FSA)	Faris 82'	Stadium: Bukit Jalil National Stadium; Referee: Yudi Nurcahya (Indonesia)

23 March 2019 2019 Airmarine Cup	Afghanistan	1–2	Malaysia	Kuala Lumpur, Malaysia
16:30 UTC+8	Shayesteh 32'	Report (WF); Report (FSA)	Faiz 44'; Alikhil 84' (o.g.)	Stadium: Bukit Jalil National Stadium; Referee: Chaireag Ngamsom (Thailand)

2 June 2019 Friendly	Malaysia	2–0	Nepal	Kuala Lumpur, Malaysia
22:00 UTC+8	Safawi 51' (pen.); Shahrul 82'	Report (WF)		Stadium: Bukit Jalil National Stadium; Attendance: 3,797; Referee: Nazmi Nasaruddin (Malaysia)

7 June 2019 (Note: The home match of Malaysia against Timor-Leste, originally to be played on 6 June 2019, was later postponed due to Eid al-Fitr celebrations following a request from the Football Association of Malaysia.) 2022 World Cup QC – AFC 1st Round	Malaysia	7–1	Timor-Leste	Kuala Lumpur, Malaysia
20:45 UTC+8	Corbin-Ong 12'; Shahrel 23'; Norshahrul 43'; Safawi 45+1', 59'; Faiz 78'; Akhyar 89'	Report	João Pedro 52'	Stadium: Bukit Jalil National Stadium; Attendance: 4,244; Referee: Sherzod Kasimov (Uzbekistan)

11 June 2019 2022 World Cup QC – AFC 1st Round	Timor-Leste	1–5	Malaysia	Kuala Lumpur, Malaysia
20:45 UTC+8	Rufino Gama 72'	Report	Shahrel 10', 17', 64'; Sumareh 37'; Akhyar 55'	Stadium: Bukit Jalil National Stadium (Note: Timor-Leste played their home match against Malaysia in the latter country due to a lack of a suitable venue in their country.); Referee: Yusuke Araki (Japan)

30 August 2019 Friendly	Malaysia	0–1	Jordan	Kuala Lumpur, Malaysia
20:45 UTC+8		Report	Murjan 7'	Stadium: Bukit Jalil National Stadium; Referee: Nazmi Nasaruddin (Malaysia)

5 September 2019 2022 World Cup QC – AFC 2nd Round	Indonesia	2–3	Malaysia	Jakarta, Indonesia
19:30 UTC+7	Gonçalves 11', 38'	Report (FIFA); Report (AFC)	Sumareh 36', 90+6'; Syafiq 65'	Stadium: Gelora Bung Karno Stadium; Attendance: 54,659; Referee: Ko Hyung-jin (South Korea)

10 September 2019 2022 World Cup QC – AFC 2nd Round	Malaysia	1–2	United Arab Emirates	Kuala Lumpur, Malaysia
20:45 UTC+8	Syafiq 1'	Report (FIFA); Report (AFC)	Mabkhout 43', 75'	Stadium: Bukit Jalil National Stadium; Attendance: 43,200; Referee: Hiroyuki Kimura (Japan)

5 October 2019 Friendly	Malaysia	6–0	Sri Lanka	Kuala Lumpur, Malaysia
20:45 UTC+8	Syafiq 9', 76', 89'; Shahrul 14'; Norshahrul 17'; Akhyar 51'	Report		Stadium: Bukit Jalil National Stadium; Referee: Razlan Joffri Ali (Malaysia)

10 October 2019 2022 World Cup QC – AFC 2nd Round	Vietnam	1–0	Malaysia	Hanoi, Vietnam
18:00 UTC+7	Nguyễn Quang Hải 40'	Report (FIFA); Report (AFC)		Stadium: Mỹ Đình National Stadium; Attendance: 38,256; Referee: Mooud Bonyadifar (Iran)

9 November 2019 Friendly	Malaysia	1–0	Tajikistan	Kuala Lumpur, Malaysia
20:45 UTC+8	Safawi 72'	Report		Stadium: Bukit Jalil National Stadium; Attendance: 14,200; Referee: Razlan Joffri Ali (Malaysia)

14 November 2019 2022 World Cup QC – AFC 2nd Round	Malaysia	2–1	Thailand	Kuala Lumpur, Malaysia
20:45 UTC+8	Gan 26'; Sumareh 57'	Report (FIFA); Report (AFC)	Chanathip 7'	Stadium: Bukit Jalil National Stadium; Attendance: 39,363; Referee: Ali Sabah (Iraq)

19 November 2019 2022 World Cup QC – AFC 2nd Round	Malaysia	2–0	Indonesia	Kuala Lumpur, Malaysia
20:45 UTC+8	Safawi 30', 73'	Report (FIFA); Report (AFC)		Stadium: Bukit Jalil National Stadium; Attendance: 75,044; Referee: Alireza Faghani (Iran)

Note

- ^{1}: Non FIFA 'A' international match
- ^{XI}: Malaysia uses a selection of players from the Malaysia Super League, Using the name Malaysia XI

== Head-to-head records ==
Malaysia national football team head-to-head records (2010–2019)
Opponent	Pld	W	D	L	GF	GA	GD	Pts	Confederation
Afghanistan	2	1	1	0	3	2	+1	4	AFC
Australia	1	0	0	1	0	5	–5	0	AFC
Bahrain	2	0	1	1	1	2	–1	1	AFC
Bangladesh	2	0	2	0	1	1	0	2	AFC
Bhutan	1	1	0	0	7	0	+7	3	AFC
Cambodia	5	5	0	0	14	4	+10	15	AFC
China	1	0	0	1	0	2	–2	0	AFC
Chinese Taipei	3	1	0	2	4	6	–2	3	AFC
Fiji	2	1	1	0	2	1	+1	4	OFC
Hong Kong	7	2	4	1	8	5	+3	10	AFC
India	2	0	1	1	3	4	–1	1	AFC
Indonesia	8	4	0	4	12	14	–2	12	AFC
Iraq	1	0	0	1	0	3	–3	0	AFC
Jordan	1	0	0	1	0	1	–1	0	AFC
Saudi Arabia	3	0	0	3	1	9	–8	0	AFC
Kuwait	1	0	0	1	0	3	–3	0	AFC
Kyrgyzstan	1	0	0	1	0	1	–1	0	AFC
Laos	4	4	0	0	15	4	+11	12	AFC
Lebanon	2	0	0	2	2	4	–2	0	AFC
Macau	1	0	1	0	0	0	0	1	AFC
Maldives	1	1	0	0	3	0	+3	3	AFC
Mongolia	1	0	1	0	2	2	0	1	AFC
Myanmar	5	2	1	2	5	2	+3	7	AFC
Nepal	1	1	0	0	2	0	+2	3	AFC
North Korea	2	0	0	2	2	8	–6	0	AFC
Oman	2	0	0	2	0	9	–9	0	AFC
Palestine	3	0	0	3	0	14	–14	0	AFC
Papua New Guinea	2	1	0	1	2	3	–1	3	OFC
Philippines	5	0	5	0	1	1	0	5	AFC
Qatar	2	0	0	2	0	3	–3	0	AFC
Singapore	8	2	3	3	11	13	–2	9	AFC
Sri Lanka	3	3	0	0	16	1	+15	9	AFC
Syria	2	0	0	2	1	5	–4	0	AFC
Tajikistan	2	1	0	1	2	4	–2	3	AFC
Thailand	10	2	4	4	10	15	–5	10	AFC
Timor-Leste	6	5	1	0	20	3	+17	16	AFC
United Arab Emirates	5	0	0	5	3	18	–15	0	AFC
Vietnam	12	2	2	8	10	17	–7	8	AFC
Yemen	3	3	0	0	5	2	+3	9	AFC
Total	125	41	27	57	150	191	–41	150	
