= 2017 Piala Tun Sharifah Rodziah =

Tournament details
- Host country: Malaysia
- Dates: 6 April – 15 April 2017
- Teams: 12 (from 20 associations)
- Venue(s): 3 (in 1 host city)

Final positions
- Champions: Sarawak
- Runners-up: Kedah
- Third place: PDRM

Tournament statistics
- Matches played: 26
- Goals scored: 79 (3.04 per match)
- All statistics correct as of 15 April 2017.

The 2017 Piala Tun Sharifah Rodziah is the 30th edition of Piala Tun Sharifah Rodziah a women's football tournament organised by Football Association of Malaysia. The defending champions is MISC. Sarawak for the first time hosted the women's football tournament and it took place in several venues around city of Miri. Sarawak defeated Kedah in the final to win their first Piala Tun Sharifah Rodziah title.

The tournament offers prize money of RM20,000, a trophy and 25 gold medals to the winner, while the runner-up RM 10,000 and 25 silver medals and third place RM 5,000 and 25 bronze.

== Venues ==
- Stadium Terbuka Miri (Miri Stadium)
- Padang Institut Kemahiran Belia Negara (IKBN) (National Youth Skills Institute Field)
- Padang Kelab Rekreasi dan Petroliam (KRP) Lutong (Recreation Club and Petroleum Field)

== Teams ==
12 teams participated in the latest edition of the tournament where the teams were divided into three groups. The winners, runners-up and the best two third-placed teams advance to the quarterfinals.

Group A	Group B	Group C
(Malaysia) MISC	Sabah	Sarawak
Perak	(Malacca) Melaka (Debut)	Kelantan (Debut)
Selangor	Kedah	Pahang
PDRM	Penang	Negeri Sembilan

== Round and draw dates ==
The draw for the group stage was held on 22 March 2017, 11:30 MYT (UTC+8), at the Wisma FAM in Petaling Jaya, Malaysia.

Phase	Round	Draw date	Date
Group stage	Matchday 1	22 March 2017 (Wisma FAM)	8 April 2017
Group stage	Matchday 2	22 March 2017 (Wisma FAM)	9 April 2017
Group stage	Matchday 3	22 March 2017 (Wisma FAM)	10 April 2017
Knockout phase	Quarterfinals	12 April 2017	
Knockout phase	Semifinals	13 April 2017	
Knockout phase	Third place	15 April 2017	
Knockout phase	Final	15 April 2017 at Miri Stadium, Miri, Sarawak	

== Groups ==
=== Group A ===
Pos	Team	Pld	W	D	L	GF	GA	GD	Pts	Qualification or relegation
1	PDRM	3	3	0	0	12	3	+9	9	Advance to Knockout Stage
2	Perak	3	2	0	1	8	5	+3	6	Advance to Knockout Stage
3	(Malaysia) MISC	3	1	0	2	4	5	−1	3	Advance to Knockout Stage if best third-placed
4	Selangor	3	0	0	3	1	12	−11	0	

Updated to match(es) played on 10 April 2017. Source: FAM
Rules for classification: 1) Points; 2) Goal difference; 3) Number of goals scored.
8 April 2017
08:00 UTC+8

MISC (Malaysia)	1–3	Perak

Miri Stadium, Miri, Sarawak
8 April 2017
08:00 UTC+8

Selangor	1–6	PDRM

Recreation Club and Petroleum, Miri, Sarawak

9 April 2017
16:15 UTC+8

Selangor	0–2	(Malaysia) MISC

PGA Battalion 12, Miri, Sarawak
9 April 2017
16:15 UTC+8

PDRM	4–1	Perak

Recreation Club and Petroleum, Miri, Sarawak

10 April 2017
16:15 UTC+8

Perak	4–0	Selangor

Recreation Club and Petroleum, Miri, Sarawak
10 April 2017
16:15 UTC+8

PDRM	2–1	(Malaysia) MISC

PGA Battalion 12, Miri, Sarawak

=== Group B ===
Pos	Team	Pld	W	D	L	GF	GA	GD	Pts	Qualification or relegation
1	Kedah	3	2	1	0	7	0	+7	7	Advance to Knockout Stage
2	Sabah	3	2	1	0	5	0	+5	7	Advance to Knockout Stage
3	Penang	3	1	0	2	3	3	0	3	Advance to Knockout Stage if best third-placed
4	(Malacca) Melaka	3	0	0	3	0	12	−12	0	

Updated to match(es) played on 10 April 2017. Source: FAM
Rules for classification: 1) Points; 2) Goal difference; 3) Number of goals scored.
8 April 2017
08:00 UTC+8

Sabah	3–0	(Malacca) Melaka

PGA Battalion 12, Miri, Sarawak
8 April 2017
16:15 UTC+8

Kedah	1–0	Penang

PGA Battalion 12, Miri, Sarawak

9 April 2017
16:15 UTC+8

Kedah	0–0	Sabah

Miri Stadium, Miri, Sarawak
9 April 2017
08:00 UTC+8

Penang	3–0	(Malacca) Melaka

Miri Stadium, Miri, Sarawak

10 April 2017
16:15 UTC+8

Melaka (Malacca)	0–6	Kedah

Miri Stadium, Miri, Sarawak
10 April 2017
08:00 UTC+8

Penang	0–2	Sabah

PGA Battalion 12, Miri, Sarawak

=== Group C ===
Pos	Team	Pld	W	D	L	GF	GA	GD	Pts	Qualification or relegation
1	Sarawak	3	3	0	0	11	0	+11	9	Advance to Knockout Stage
2	Pahang	3	2	0	1	6	3	+3	6	Advance to Knockout Stage
3	Kelantan	3	0	1	2	1	6	−5	1	Advance to Knockout Stage if best third-placed
4	Negeri Sembilan	3	0	1	2	1	10	−9	1	

Updated to match(es) played on 10 April 2017. Source: FAM
Rules for classification: 1) Points; 2) Goal difference; 3) Number of goals scored.
8 April 2017
16:15 UTC+8

Sarawak	2–0	Kelantan

Miri Stadium, Miri, Sarawak
8 April 2017
16:15 UTC+8

Pahang	3–0	Negeri Sembilan

Recreation Club and Petroleum, Miri, Sarawak

9 April 2017
08:00 UTC+8

Pahang	0–3	Sarawak

PGA Battalion 12, Miri, Sarawak
9 April 2017
08:00 UTC+8

Negeri Sembilan	1–1	Kelantan

Recreation Club and Petroleum, Miri, Sarawak

10 April 2017
08:00 UTC+8

Kelantan	0–3	Pahang

Miri Stadium, Miri, Sarawak
10 April 2017
08:00 UTC+8

Negeri Sembilan	0–6	Sarawak

Recreation Club and Petroleum, Miri, Sarawak

== Ranking of third-placed teams ==
Pos	Grp	Team	Pld	W	D	L	GF	GA	GD	Pts	Qualification
1	B	Penang	3	1	0	2	3	3	0	3	Advance to Knockout Stage
2	A	(Malaysia) MISC	3	1	0	2	4	5	−1	3	Advance to Knockout Stage
3	C	Kelantan	3	0	1	2	1	6	−5	1	

Updated to match(es) played on 10 April 2017. Source: FAM

== Knockout stage ==
=== Bracket ===
Quarterfinals
PDRM	2
Penang	1
Sarawak	0(3)
Sabah	0(2)
Kedah	6
(Malaysia) MISC	0
Perak	2(2)
Pahang	2(4)

Semifinals
PDRM	0(2)
Sarawak	0(3)
Kedah	1
Pahang	0

Final
Sarawak	1
Kedah	0

=== Quarterfinals ===
12 April 2017
16:15 UTC+8

PDRM	2–1	Penang

Petroliam Recreation Club, Miri, Sarawak
12 April 2017
16:15 UTC+8

Sarawak	0–0 (a.e.t.)	Sabah
Penalties
	3–2

Miri Stadium, Miri, Sarawak
12 April 2017
08:00 UTC+8

Kedah	6–0	(Malaysia) MISC

Petroliam Recreation Club, Miri, Sarawak
12 April 2017
08:00 UTC+8

Perak	2–2 (a.e.t.)	Pahang
Penalties
	2–4

Miri Stadium, Miri, Sarawak

=== Semifinals ===
13 April 2017
16:15 UTC+8

PDRM	0–0 (a.e.t.)	Sarawak
Penalties
	2–3

Miri Stadium, Miri, Sarawak
13 April 2017
16:15 UTC+8

Kedah	1–0	Pahang

Petroliam Recreation Club, Miri, Sarawak

=== Third place ===
15 April 2017
08:00 UTC+8

PDRM	4–1	Pahang
Angela Kasi ?', ?', ?', ?'	Report	Puteri Noralisa Wilkinson ?'

Petroliam Recreation Club, Miri, Sarawak

=== Final ===
15 April 2017
15:30 UTC+8

Sarawak	1–0	Kedah
Siti Rohani Saptu 36'	Report

Miri Stadium, Miri, Sarawak
Attendance: 3,000+

== Champions ==
2017 Piala Tun Sharifah Rodziah
champions
(Sarawak) Sarawak
1st title
