= 2010 in Malaysian football =

Football in Malaysia
- Season: 2010

Men's football
- Super League: Selangor
- Premier League: Felda United
- FAM League: Sime Darby
- FA Cup: Negeri Sembilan
- Malaysia Cup: Kelantan
- Community Shield: Selangor

The 2010 season of competitive association football in Malaysia.

== Promotion and relegation ==
=== Preseason ===
| League | Promoted to league | Relegated from league |
|---|---|---|
| Liga Super | T-Team; Johor; Kuala Lumpur | PDRM |
| Liga Premier | Pos Malaysia; USM; MP Muar | SDMS Kepala Batas; MBJB |

== New and withdrawn teams ==
=== New teams ===
- (Kuala Lumpur) Sime Darby (FAM League)
- (Kuala Lumpur) KL SPA (FAM League)

=== Withdrawn teams ===
- (Kedah) Kuala Muda Naza (Super League)
- (Kuala Lumpur) UPB-Myteam (Super League)
- (Selangor) Proton (Premier League)
- Penjara (FAM League)

== National team ==
Win Draw Lose

=== Malaysia national football team ===
==== 2011 AFC Asian Cup qualification ====
| Team | Pld | W | D | L | GF | GA | GD | Pts |
|---|---|---|---|---|---|---|---|---|
| United Arab Emirates | 4 | 3 | 0 | 1 | 7 | 1 | +6 | 9 |
| Uzbekistan | 4 | 3 | 0 | 1 | 7 | 3 | +4 | 9 |
| Malaysia | 4 | 0 | 0 | 4 | 2 | 12 | −10 | 0 |

| | (Malaysia) | (United Arab Emirates) | (Uzbekistan) |
|---|---|---|---|
| Malaysia | – | 0–5 | 1–3 |
| United Arab Emirates | 1–0 | – | 0–1 |
| Uzbekistan | 3–1 | 0–1 | – |

| 6 January 2010 | United Arab Emirates | 1 – 0 | Malaysia | Al Shabab Stadium, Dubai |
| 19:00 UTC+4 | A. Khalil 90+3' | Report | | Attendance: 3,500; Referee: Mohsen Basma (Syria) |

Note: Previous matches are held in 2009

==== 2010 AFF Championship ====
===== Group stage =====
| Team | Pld | W | D | L | GF | GA | GD | Pts |
|---|---|---|---|---|---|---|---|---|
| Indonesia | 3 | 3 | 0 | 0 | 13 | 2 | +11 | 9 |
| Malaysia | 3 | 1 | 1 | 1 | 6 | 6 | 0 | 4 |
| Thailand | 3 | 0 | 2 | 1 | 3 | 4 | −1 | 2 |
| Laos | 3 | 0 | 1 | 2 | 3 | 13 | −10 | 1 |

| 1 December 2010 | Indonesia | 5 – 1 | Malaysia | Gelora Bung Karno Stadium, Jakarta |
| 19:30 UTC+7 | Asraruddin 22' (o.g.); Gonzáles 33'; Ridwan 52'; Arif 76'; Irfan 90+4' | Report | Norshahrul 18' | Attendance: 62,000; Referee: Vo Minh Tri (Vietnam) |

| 4 December 2010 | Thailand | 0 – 0 | Malaysia | Gelora Bung Karno Stadium, Jakarta |
| 17:00 UTC+7 | | Report | | Referee: Sgt. Win Cho (Myanmar) |

| 7 December 2010 | Malaysia | 5 – 1 | Laos | Gelora Sriwijaya Stadium, Palembang |
| 19:30 UTC+7 | Amri 4', 41'; Amirul 74'; Norshahrul 77'; Mahali 90+3' | Report | Singto 8' | Referee: Vo Minh Tri (Vietnam) |

===== Semi-final =====
First Leg

| 15 December 2010 | Malaysia | 2 – 0 | Vietnam | Bukit Jalil National Stadium, Kuala Lumpur |
| 20:00 UTC+8 | Safee 60', 79' | Report | | Attendance: 45,000; Referee: Sun Baojie (China PR) |

Second Leg

| 18 December 2010 | Vietnam | 0 – 0 | Malaysia | Mỹ Đình National Stadium, Hanoi |
| 19:00 UTC+7 | | Report | | Attendance: 40,000; Referee: Kim Sang-Woo (Korea Republic) |

Malaysia won 2–0 on aggregate.

===== Final =====
First Leg

| 26 December 2010 | Malaysia | 3 – 0 | Indonesia | Bukit Jalil National Stadium, Kuala Lumpur |
| 20:00 UTC+8 | Safee 61', 73'; Ashaari 68' | Report | | Attendance: 98,543; Referee: Masaaki Toma (Japan) |

Second Leg

| 29 December 2010 | Indonesia | 2 – 1 | Malaysia | Gelora Bung Karno Stadium, Jakarta |
| 19:00 UTC+7 | Nasuha 72'; Ridwan 87' | Report | Safee 54' | Attendance: 88,000; Referee: Peter Green (Australia) |

Malaysia won 4–2 on aggregate.

==== International Friendlies ====
| 27 February 2010 | Malaysia | 1 – 0 | Yemen | National Stadium Bukit Jalil, Kuala Lumpur |
| 20:45 UTC+8 | Baddroll 55' |

| 31 August 2010 | El Jaish SC (Qatar) | 2 – 1 | Malaysia | Al-Wakrah Stadium, Al Wakrah |
| | | | Fakri 46' |

| 3 September 2010 | Oman | 3 - 0 | Malaysia | Al-Wakrah Stadium, Al Wakrah |
| | Rabia 3'; Al-Hosni 38' 44' |

| 26 November 2010 | Malaysia | 2 - 3 | Selangor FA | MBPJ Stadium, Kelana Jaya, Selangor |
| | Faizal 59'; K. Gurusamy 70' |

| 12 December 2010 | Malaysia | 2 - 0 | Kuala Lumpur FA | KLFA Stadium, Cheras, Kuala Lumpur |
| | Amri 23'; Muhymeen 40' (pen.) |

| 26 November 2010 | Malaysia | 2 - 0 | (Pahang) Felda United FC | Wisma FAM, Kelana Jaya, Selangor |
| | Ashaari 55'; Safee 89' |

=== Malaysia national under-23 football team ===
==== 2010 Asian Games ====
===== Group stage =====
| Team | Pld | W | D | L | GF | GA | GD | Pts |
|---|---|---|---|---|---|---|---|---|
| Japan | 3 | 3 | 0 | 0 | 8 | 0 | +8 | 9 |
| China | 3 | 2 | 0 | 1 | 5 | 4 | +1 | 6 |
| Malaysia | 3 | 1 | 0 | 2 | 2 | 6 | −4 | 3 |
| Kyrgyzstan | 3 | 0 | 0 | 3 | 2 | 7 | −5 | 0 |

| 8 November 2010 | Malaysia | 2 – 1 | Kyrgyzstan | Huadu Stadium, Guangzhou |
| 16:00 UTC+8 | Idlan 27'; Chanturu 60' | | Sydykov 37' | Referee: Win Cho (Myanmar) |

| 10 November 2010 | Malaysia | 0 – 2 | Japan | Huadu Stadium, Guangzhou |
| 16:00 UTC+8 | | | Nagai 26'; Yamaguchi 64' | Referee: Ali Abdulnabi (Bahrain) |

| 13 November 2010 | China | 3–0 | Malaysia | Tianhe Stadium, Guangzhou |
| 19:00 UTC+8 | Li Jianbin 61'; Zhao Honglüe 65'; Zhang Linpeng 83' (pen.) | | | Referee: Ben Williams (Australia) |

===== 1/8 final =====
| 15 November 2010 | Iran | 3 – 1 | Malaysia | Yuexiushan Stadium, Guangzhou |
| 16:00 UTC+8 | Ansarifard 53'; Hosseini 59'; Sharafi 67' | | Idlan 86' (pen.) | Referee: Tayeb Shamsuzzaman (Bangladesh) |

==== Eximbank Cup/Thang Long Cup (Ho Chi Minh City) 2010 ====
===== Group stage =====
| Pos | Team | Pld | W | D | L | GF | GA | GD | Pts |
|---|---|---|---|---|---|---|---|---|---|
| 1 | Vietnam | 3 | 2 | 1 | 0 | 4 | 1 | +3 | 7 |
| 2 | Iran | 3 | 1 | 1 | 1 | 3 | 3 | 0 | 4 |
| 3 | Singapore | 3 | 0 | 3 | 0 | 1 | 1 | 0 | 3 |
| 4 | Malaysia | 3 | 0 | 1 | 2 | 1 | 4 | −3 | 1 |

Source: Eximbank Cup/Thang Long Cup (Ho Chi Minh City) 2010

| 28 September 2010 | Vietnam | 2 – 1 | Malaysia | Thống Nhất Stadium, Ho Chi Minh City, Vietnam |
| | Nguyen Anh Duc 19', 26' | | Norshahrul 44' |

| 30 September 2010 | Iran | 2 – 0 | Malaysia | Thống Nhất Stadium, Ho Chi Minh City, Vietnam |
| | Iman 41'; Arash Afshin 75' | | | Referee: Phung Dinh Dung Vietnam |

| 2 October 2010 | Malaysia | 0 – 0 | Singapore | Thống Nhất Stadium, Ho Chi Minh City, Vietnam |

== League season ==
=== Super League ===
| Pos | Team | Pld | W | D | L | GF | GA | GD | Pts | Qualification or relegation |
|---|---|---|---|---|---|---|---|---|---|---|
| 1 | Selangor | 26 | 20 | 3 | 3 | 62 | 23 | +39 | 63 | |
| 2 | Kelantan | 26 | 17 | 8 | 1 | 50 | 14 | +36 | 59 | |
| 3 | Terengganu | 26 | 15 | 5 | 6 | 51 | 27 | +24 | 50 | |
| 4 | Johor FC | 26 | 13 | 4 | 9 | 44 | 29 | +15 | 43 | |
| 5 | Kedah | 26 | 10 | 8 | 8 | 34 | 23 | +11 | 38 | |
| 6 | Negeri Sembilan | 26 | 11 | 5 | 10 | 40 | 31 | +9 | 38 | |
| 7 | T–Team | 26 | 10 | 8 | 8 | 33 | 26 | +7 | 38 | |
| 8 | Pahang | 26 | 10 | 3 | 13 | 31 | 50 | −19 | 33 | |
| 9 | Kuala Lumpur | 26 | 8 | 8 | 10 | 20 | 29 | −9 | 32 | |
| 10 | PLUS | 26 | 8 | 6 | 12 | 29 | 29 | 0 | 30 | Withdrawal from Liga Super (Note: PLUS withdrew from Liga Super before the start of 2011 season.) |
| 11 | Perak | 26 | 8 | 6 | 12 | 25 | 30 | −5 | 30 | |
| 12 | Perlis | 26 | 8 | 5 | 13 | 32 | 35 | −3 | 29 | |
| 13 | Johor | 26 | 5 | 1 | 20 | 18 | 66 | −48 | 16 | Relegation to 2011 Liga Premier |
| 14 | Penang | 26 | 2 | 4 | 20 | 10 | 67 | −57 | 10 | Relegation to 2011 Liga Premier |

Source: Results TM Liga Super
Rules for classification: 1) points; 2) goal difference; 3) number of goals scored.

=== Premier League ===
| Pos | Team | Pld | W | D | L | GF | GA | GD | Pts | Promotion or relegation |
|---|---|---|---|---|---|---|---|---|---|---|
| 1 | Felda United | 22 | 15 | 5 | 2 | 48 | 12 | +36 | 50 | Promotion to Super League |
| 2 | Sabah | 22 | 15 | 3 | 4 | 42 | 14 | +28 | 48 | Promotion to Super League |
| 3 | PKNS | 22 | 14 | 3 | 5 | 56 | 18 | +38 | 45 | |
| 4 | ATM | 22 | 11 | 9 | 2 | 49 | 18 | +31 | 42 | |
| 5 | Harimau Muda | 22 | 11 | 4 | 7 | 49 | 39 | +10 | 37 | |
| 6 | Sarawak | 22 | 11 | 4 | 7 | 42 | 34 | +8 | 37 | |
| 7 | PDRM | 22 | 8 | 4 | 10 | 37 | 41 | −4 | 28 | |
| 8 | Pos Malaysia | 22 | 7 | 3 | 12 | 41 | 43 | −2 | 24 | |
| 9 | USM | 22 | 6 | 5 | 11 | 28 | 40 | −12 | 23 | |
| 10 | MP Muar | 22 | 5 | 3 | 14 | 19 | 68 | −49 | 18 | |
| 11 | Malacca | 22 | 4 | 3 | 15 | 31 | 68 | −37 | 15 | Relegation to FAM League |
| 12 | Shahzan Muda | 22 | 1 | 2 | 19 | 15 | 62 | −47 | 5 | Relegation to FAM League |

Source: FAM Website, Results TM Premier League
Rules for classification: 1) Points; 2) Goal difference; 3) Number of goals scored

=== FAM League ===
| Pos | Team | Pld | W | D | L | GF | GA | GD | Pts | Qualification or relegation |
|---|---|---|---|---|---|---|---|---|---|---|
| 1 | Sime Darby | 14 | 11 | 3 | 0 | 36 | 3 | +33 | 36 | Promoted to 2011 Malaysia Premier League. |
| 2 | SDMS Kepala Batas | 14 | 9 | 3 | 2 | 41 | 15 | +26 | 30 | Promoted to 2011 Malaysia Premier League. |
| 3 | KL SPA | 14 | 9 | 3 | 2 | 28 | 14 | +14 | 30 | |
| 4 | UiTM Pahang | 14 | 6 | 2 | 6 | 29 | 17 | +12 | 20 | |
| 5 | MB Johor Bahru | 14 | 4 | 1 | 9 | 15 | 22 | −7 | 13 | |
| 6 | KSK Tambun Tulang | 14 | 3 | 4 | 7 | 18 | 31 | −13 | 13 | Withdrew from 2011 Malaysia FAM League. |
| 7 | Melodi Jaya Sports Club | 13 | 2 | 4 | 7 | 13 | 28 | −15 | 10 | |
| 8 | Juara Ban Huo Leong Sports Club | 14 | 1 | 1 | 12 | 13 | 45 | −32 | 4 | Withdrew from 2011 Malaysia FAM League. |

Source: Rec.Sport.Soccer Statistics Foundation
Rules for classification: 1) Points; 2) Goal difference; 3) Number of goals scored.

== Domestic Cups ==
=== Charity shield ===
| 9 January 2010 | Negeri Sembilan | 1 – 2 | Selangor | Tuanku Abdul Rahman Stadium, Paroi, Negeri Sembilan |
| | Rezal Zambery 27' | | Safee Sali 76'; D. Surendran 83' | Attendance: 25,000; Referee: (Malaysia) Subkhiddin Mohd Salleh |

=== FA Cup ===
==== Final ====
| 10 April 2010 | Negeri Sembilan | 1 - 1 (5 - 4 p) | Kedah | National Stadium Bukit Jalil, Kuala Lumpur |
| 20:45 UTC+8 | Shaffik 39' | | Baddrol 27' | Attendance: 70,000; Referee: (Malaysia) R. Krishnan |
| | Penalties |
| | Mohd Zaquan Adha Abdul Radzak (penalty missed); Norizam Salaman (penalty scored); Mohd Aidil Zafuan Abdul Radzak (penalty scored); S. Kunanlan (penalty scored); Muhammad Shukor Adan (penalty scored); Muhamad Asyriff Afiq Shahrulzaman (penalty missed); Rezal Zambery Yahya (penalty scored) | | (penalty scored) Shahrulnizam Mustapa; (penalty scored) Baddrol Bakhtiar; (penalty missed) Mohd Fazliata Taib; (penalty scored) Mohd Azmi Muslim; (penalty scored) Muhammad Aminuddin Azmi; (penalty missed) Mohd Helmi Eliza Elias; (penalty missed) Mohd Sabre Mat Abu |

- Negeri Sembilan win 5–4 on penalties

=== Malaysia Cup ===
==== Final ====
| 30 October 2010 | Negeri Sembilan | 1 – 2 | Kelantan | National Stadium Bukit Jalil, Kuala Lumpur |
| 20:45 UTC+8 | Shahurain Abu Samah 18' (pen.) | Report | Hairuddin Omar 57'; Mohd Badri Mohd Radzi 65' | Attendance: 100,200; Referee: Subkhiddin Mohd Salleh |

== Malaysian clubs in Asia ==
=== Selangor FA ===
==== Group stage ====
| Team | Pld | W | D | L | GF | GA | GD | Pts |
|---|---|---|---|---|---|---|---|---|
| (Indonesia) Sriwijaya | 6 | 4 | 1 | 1 | 17 | 3 | +14 | 13 |
| (Vietnam) Bình Dương | 6 | 4 | 1 | 1 | 14 | 2 | +12 | 13 |
| (Malaysia) Selangor | 6 | 1 | 1 | 4 | 7 | 16 | −9 | 4 |
| (Maldives) Victory SC | 6 | 1 | 1 | 4 | 2 | 19 | −17 | 4 |

| 23 February 2010 | Selangor (Malaysia) | 0 – 0 | (Vietnam) Bình Dương | Shah Alam Stadium, Shah Alam |
| 20:45 UTC+8 | | Report | | Attendance: 30,000; Referee: Kenji Ogiya (Japan) |

| 16 March 2010 | Sriwijaya (Indonesia) | 6 – 1 | (Malaysia) Selangor | Jakabaring Stadium, Palembang |
| 16:00 UTC+7 | Suyono 38', 69'; Krangar 39'; Rivai 58'; Gumbs 86', 89' | Report | Safee 16' | Attendance: 14,000; Referee: Ng Chiu Kok (Hong Kong) |

| 24 March 2010 | Victory SC (Maldives) | 2 – 1 | (Malaysia) Selangor | National Stadium, Male |
| 16:00 UTC+5 | Naseer 16'; Mohammed 79' | Report | Amirul Hadi 47' | Attendance: 4,500; Referee: Yu Ming-Hsun (Chinese Taipei) |

| 6 April 2010 | Selangor (Malaysia) | 5 – 0 | (Maldives) Victory SC | Shah Alam Stadium, Shah Alam |
| 20:45 UTC+8 | Safee 24', 48'; Rudie 28'; Safiq 44'; Hardi 56' | Report | | Attendance: 32,180; Referee: Liu Kwok Man (Hong Kong) |

| 21 April 2010 | Bình Dương (Vietnam) | 4 – 0 | (Malaysia) Selangor | Gò Đậu Stadium, Thủ Dầu Một |
| 18:00 UTC+7 | Kesley Alves 31', 63', 90' (pen.); Nguyễn Vũ Phong 69' | Report | | Attendance: 20,000; Referee: Mohammad Mousa (Jordan) |

| 28 April 2010 | Selangor (Malaysia) | 0 – 4 | (Indonesia) Sriwijaya | Shah Alam Stadium, Shah Alam |
| 20:45 UTC+8 | | Report | Gumbs 27', 90'; Obiora 42'; Astaman 82' | Attendance: 34,200; Referee: Fan Qi (China PR) |
