= 2011 in Malaysian football =

Football in Malaysia
- Season: 2011

Men's football
- Super League: Kelantan
- Premier League: Selangor PKNS
- FAM League: NS Betaria FC
- FA Cup: Terengganu
- Malaysia Cup: Negeri Sembilan
- Community Shield: Kelantan

The 2011 season was the 32nd season of competitive football in Malaysia.

== Promotion and Relegation ==
Teams relegated from the Malaysia Super League

- Pahang FA
- Perlis FA

Teams promoted to the Malaysia Super League

- PKNS FC
- Sarawak FA

Teams relegated from the Malaysia Premier League

- SDMS Kepala Batas FC
- Penang FA

Teams promoted to the Malaysia Premier League

- Betaria FC
- Johor MBJB FC

== Coaching changes ==
| Club | Outgoing Head Coach | Date of vacancy | Manner of departure | Incoming Head Coach | Date of appointment |
|---|---|---|---|---|---|
| Kelantan FA | (Malaysia) B. Sathianathan | 24 January 2011 | Resigned | (Malaysia) M. Karathu | 26 January 2011 |
| Perlis FA | (Malaysia) Mosthakeen Omar | 1 March 2011 | Resigned | (Malaysia) Salim Tofel Mohamad (caretaker) | 8 March 2011 |
| Kedah FA | (Malaysia) Ahmad Yusof | 7 March 2011 | Gardening leave^{1} | (Malaysia) Muhamad Radhi Mat Din (caretaker) | 7 March 2011 |
| Negeri Sembilan FA | (Malaysia) Wan Jamak Wan Hassan | 16 March 2011 | Resigned | (Malaysia) Mohd Azraai Khor Abdullah | 21 March 2011 |
| Kedah FA | (Malaysia) Muhamad Radhi Mat Din (caretaker) | 23 April 2011 | End of caretaker role | (Malaysia) Wan Jamak Wan Hassan | 23 April 2011 |
| Perlis FA | (Malaysia) Salim Tofel Mohamad (caretaker) | 26 April 2011 | End of caretaker role | (Hungary) Jánós Krécská | 26 April 2011 |
| Sabah FA | (Australia) Gary Phillips | 5 May 2011 | Sacked | (Malaysia) Justin Ganai | 5 May 2011 |

== National teams competitions ==
=== Men's senior team ===
| Date | Opponent | Score* | Venue | Competition | Malaysia scorers |
|---|---|---|---|---|---|
| February 9 | Hong Kong | 2–0 (W) | Shah Alam Stadium, Selangor (H) | Friendly Match | Safiq 44' Amirul Hadi 90+2' |
| March 26 | (Singapore) Etoile FC | 1–1 (D) | Jalan Besar Stadium, Jalan Besar (A) | Friendly Match^{1} | Fakri 7' |
| June 3 | Hong Kong | 1–1 (D) | Siu Sai Wan Sports Ground, Siu Sai Wan (A) | Friendly Match | Abdul Hadi 66' |
| June 18 | Myanmar | 2–0 (W) | Sultan Mohammad IV Stadium, Kota Bharu (H) | Friendly Match | Amirul Hadi 28' Baddrol 54' |
| June 24 | (Malaysia) Harimau Muda A | 3–1 (W) | MBPJ Stadium, Selangor (H) | Friendly Match^{1} | Baddrol 3' Fakri 72' Sasi Kumar 84' |
| June 29 | Chinese Taipei | 2–1 (W) | National Stadium, Bukit Jalil, Kuala Lumpur (H) | 2014 FIFA World Cup qualification | Safiq 28' Aidil 55' |
| July 3 | Chinese Taipei | 2–3 (L) | Taipei Municipal Stadium, Taipei (A) | 2014 FIFA World Cup qualification | Aidil 8' Safiq 40' |
| July 23 | Singapore | 3–5 (L) | Jalan Besar Stadium, Jalan Besar (A) | 2014 FIFA World Cup qualification | Safee 1', 71' Abdul Hadi 70' |
| July 28 | Singapore | 1–1 (D) | National Stadium, Bukit Jalil, Kuala Lumpur (H) | 2014 FIFA World Cup qualification | Safee 58' |
| August 6 | (Malaysia) Selangor FA | 0–1 (L) | Shah Alam Stadium, Selangor (A) | Friendly Match^{1} | |
| October 2 | Malaysia U-23 | 3–0 (W) | Wisma FAM, Selangor (H) | Friendly Match^{1} | Norshahrul 36' Baddrol 48' Shahrizal 88' |
| October 7 | Australia | 0–5 (L) | Canberra Stadium, Canberra (A) | Friendly Match | |
| October 2 | (Malaysia) Negeri Sembilan FA | 2–0 (W) | Tuanku Abdul Rahman Stadium, Paroi, Negeri Sembilan (A) | Friendly Match^{1} | Safiq 40' Shahrizal 91' |
| November 13 | India | 1–1 (D) | Indira Gandhi Athletic Stadium, Guwahati (A) | Friendly Match | Safiq 42' |
| November 16 | India | 2–3 (L) | Salt Lake Stadium, Kolkata (A) | Friendly Match | Safee 45', 60' |

- ^{1} Non FIFA 'A' international match
- ^{XI} Malaysia uses a selection of players from the Malaysia Super League, Using the name Malaysia XI

=== League XI ===
| Date | Opponent | Score* | Venue | Competition | Malaysia scorers |
|---|---|---|---|---|---|
| July 13 | (England) Arsenal | 0–4 (L) | National Stadium, Bukit Jalil, Kuala Lumpur (H) | Friendly Match^{1} ^{XI} | |
| July 16 | (England) Liverpool | 3–6 (L) | National Stadium, Bukit Jalil, Kuala Lumpur (H) | Friendly Match^{1} ^{XI} | Safiq 44' Safee 79', 82' |
| July 21 | (England) Chelsea | 0–1 (L) | National Stadium, Bukit Jalil, Kuala Lumpur (H) | Friendly Match^{1} ^{XI} | |

- ^{1} Non FIFA 'A' international match
- ^{XI} Malaysia uses a selection of players from the Malaysia Super League, Using the name Malaysia XI

=== Men's under-23 team ===
* Malaysia's score always listed first

| Date | Opponent | Score* | Venue | Competition | Malaysia scorers |
|---|---|---|---|---|---|
| January 20 | Thailand U-23 | 1–2 (L) | Rajamangala Stadium, Thailand (A) | Friendly Match | Syahrul Azwari 75' |
| January 24 | Singapore U-23 | 2–0 (W) | Jalan Besar Stadium, Singapore (A) | Friendly Match | Irfan Fazail 23' Syahrul Azwari 45+1' |
| February 23 | Pakistan U-23 | 2–0 (W) | Shah Alam Stadium, Malaysia (H) | Football at the 2012 Summer Olympics – Men's Asian Qualifiers | Zaharulnizam Zakaria 4' Irfan Fazail 45+4' |
| March 9 | Pakistan U-23 | 0–0 (D) | Punjab Football Stadium, Pakistan (A) | Football at the 2012 Summer Olympics – Men's Asian Qualifiers | |
| June 7 | Cambodia U-23 | 0–1 (L) | National Olympic Stadium, Cambodia (A) | Friendly Match | |
| June 13 | Qatar U-23 | 0–4 (L) | Jassim Bin Hamad Stadium, Doha, Qatar (A) | Friendly Match | |
| June 19 | Lebanon U-23 | 0–0 (D) | Sport City Stadium, Lebanon (A) | Football at the 2012 Summer Olympics – Men's Asian Qualifiers | |
| June 23 | Lebanon U-23 | 2–1 (W) | National Stadium, Bukit Jalil, Kuala Lumpur (H) | Football at the 2012 Summer Olympics – Men's Asian Qualifiers | Irfan Fazail 7' Wan Zack Haikal 40' |
| July 21 | (England) Chelsea | 0–1 (L) | National Stadium, Bukit Jalil, Kuala Lumpur (H) | Friendly Match | |
| July 26 | (Slovakia) FK Bodva Moldava | 1–0 (W) | Štadión Steel Slovakia Aréna, Slovakia (A) | Friendly Match (Slovak Tour) | Wan Zack Haikal 47' |
| July 30 | (Slovakia) MFK Topvar Topoľčany | 2–1 (W) | Futbalový Štadión Vojtecha Schotterta, Slovakia (A) | Friendly Match (Slovak Tour) | Ferris Danial 64' Fandi Othman 87' |
| August 2 | (Slovakia) MFK Tatran Liptovský | 2–1 (W) | Štadión Liptovský Mikuláš, Slovakia (A) | Friendly Match (Slovak Tour) | Hazwan Bakri 10' Irfan Fazail 86' |
| August 9 | (Hungary) Budapest Honvéd FC | 1–4 (L) | Bozsik Stadion, Hungary (A) | Friendly Match (Slovak Tour) | Wan Zack Haikal 55' |
| August 16 | (Slovakia) MFK Dolný Kubín | 2–0 (W) | Štadión MDUr. Ivana Chodáka, Slovakia (A) | Friendly Match (Slovak Tour) | Wan Zack Haikal 9' Hazwan Bakri 37' |
| August 23 | (Slovakia) FC Nitra | 0–1 (L) | Štadión pod Zoborom, Slovakia (A) | Friendly Match (Slovak Tour) | |
| August 24 | (Slovakia) FK Slovan Levice | 1–0 (W) | Futbalový Štadión Levice, Slovakia (A) | Friendly Match (Slovak Tour) | Izuan 3' |
| September 7 | (Iraq) Arbil SC | 0–0 (D) | Wisma FAM, Malaysia (H) | Friendly Match | |
| September 15 | Oman U-23 | 0–1 (L) | UiTM Stadium, Shah Alam, Selangor, Malaysia (H) | Friendly Match | |
| September 21 | Japan U-23 | 0–2 (L) | Tosu Stadium, Tosu, Japan (A) | 2012 Summer Olympics Qualifiers | |
| October 2 | Malaysia | 0–3 (L) | Wisma FAM, Malaysia (H) | Friendly Match | |
| October 6 | (Malaysia) Selangor FA | 4–2 (W) | Wisma FAM, Malaysia (H) | Friendly Match | Saarvindran 4' Thamil Arasu 23' Kok Luen 80' Hazwan Bakri 81' |
| October 15 | Nepal | 2–0 (W) | MBPJ Stadium, Petaling Jaya (H) | Friendly Match | Izzaq 81' Kuong Yong 90' |
| October 19 | Uzbekistan U-23 | 1–3 (L) | Mỹ Đình National Stadium, Hanoi (N) | 2011 VFF Cup | Fandi Othman 91' |
| October 21 | Myanmar U-23 | 2–1 (W) | Mỹ Đình National Stadium, Hanoi (N) | 2011 VFF Cup | Syahrul Azwari 54' Bakhtiar 85' |
| October 23 | Vietnam U-23 | 1–1 (D) | Mỹ Đình National Stadium, Hanoi (A) | 2011 VFF Cup | Bakhtiar 42' |
| October 30 | Laos U-23 | 4–1 (W) | Shah Alam Stadium, Selangor (H) | Friendly Match | Fandi 62' Syahrul 72', 79' Thamil Arasu 82' |
| November 7 | Singapore U-23 | 0–0 (D) | Gelora Bung Karno Stadium, Jakarta (N) | 2011 Southeast Asian Games | |
| November 9 | Thailand U-23 | 2–1 (W) | Gelora Bung Karno Stadium, Jakarta (N) | 2011 Southeast Asian Games | Baddrol 24' Izzaq 85' |
| November 13 | Cambodia U-23 | 4–1 (W) | Gelora Bung Karno Stadium, Jakarta (N) | 2011 Southeast Asian Games | Izzaq 7' Baddrol 36', 39' Wan 90' |
| November 17 | Indonesia U-23 | 1–0 (W) | Gelora Bung Karno Stadium, Jakarta (A) | 2011 Southeast Asian Games | Syahrul 17' |
| November 19 | Myanmar U-23 | 1–0 (W) | Gelora Bung Karno Stadium, Jakarta (N) | 2011 Southeast Asian Games | Fakri 84' |
| November 21 | Indonesia U-23 | 1–1 PSO; 4–3 (W) | Gelora Bung Karno Stadium, Jakarta (A) | 2011 Southeast Asian Games | Asraruddin 34' |
| November 23 | Syria U-23 | 0–2 (L) | National Stadium, Bukit Jalil, Kuala Lumpur (H) | 2012 Summer Olympics Qualifiers | |
| November 27 | Bahrain U-23 | 2–3 (L) | National Stadium, Bukit Jalil, Kuala Lumpur (H) | 2012 Summer Olympics Qualifiers | Nazmi 28' Mahali 69' |
| December 13 | (Australia) Sydney FC | 3–0 (W) | Macquarie University Training Field, Sydney, Australia (A) | Friendly Match | Gurusamy 40'; Hazwan 81', 90+2' |
| December 14 | (Australia) Central Coast Mariners | 0–1 (L) | Mingara Athletics Track, Tumbi Umbi, New South Wales, Australia (A) | Friendly Match | |
| December 19 | (Australia) Central Coast Mariners | 4–1 (W) | Mingara Athletics Track, Tumbi Umbi, New South Wales, Australia (A) | Friendly Match | Thamil Arasu 13'; Hazwan 48', 60'; Fakri 71' |

=== Men's under-19 team ===
* Malaysia's score always listed first

| Date | Opponent | Score* | Venue | Competition |
|---|---|---|---|---|
| September 9 | Cambodia U-19 | 0–0 (D) | Thuwanna YTC Stadium, Myanmar (A) | 2011 AFF U-19 Youth Championship |
| September 11 | Thailand U-19 | 0–1 (L) | Thuwanna YTC Stadium, Myanmar (A) | 2011 AFF U-19 Youth Championship |
| September 13 | Singapore U-19 | 6–0 (W) | Thuwanna YTC Stadium, Myanmar (A) | 2011 AFF U-19 Youth Championship |
| September 17 | Philippines U-19 | 6–0 (W) | Thuwanna YTC Stadium, Myanmar (A) | 2011 AFF U-19 Youth Championship |
| September 19 | Vietnam U-19 | 1–2 (L) | Thuwanna YTC Stadium, Myanmar (A) | 2011 AFF U-19 Youth Championship |
| September 21 | Myanmar U-19 | 0–0 (D) PSO; 4–2 (W) | Thuwanna YTC Stadium, Myanmar (A) | 2011 AFF U-19 Youth Championship |
| October 31 | Vietnam U-19 | 0–0 (D) | Thanh Long Sports Centre, Vietnam (A) | 2012 AFC U-19 Championship qualification |
| November 2 | Laos U-19 | 4–1 (W) | Thanh Long Sports Centre, Vietnam (A) | 2012 AFC U-19 Championship qualification |
| November 6 | (North Korea) Korea DPR U-19 | 1–4 (L) | Thanh Long Sports Centre, Vietnam (A) | 2012 AFC U-19 Championship qualification |
| November 8 | Myanmar U-19 | 0–0 (D) | Thanh Long Sports Centre, Vietnam (A) | 2012 AFC U-19 Championship qualification |

=== Men's under-16 team ===
* Malaysia's score always listed first

| Date | Opponent | Score* | Venue | Competition | Malaysia scorers |
|---|---|---|---|---|---|
| July 7 | Thailand U-16 | 2–2 (D) | New Laos National Stadium, Laos (A) | 2011 AFF U-16 Youth Championship | Amirul Syafieq 30' Hakimi 70' |
| July 9 | Indonesia U-16 | 1–1 (D) | New Laos National Stadium, Laos (A) | 2011 AFF U-16 Youth Championship | Adam 49' |
| July 13 | Laos U-16 | 1–1 (D) | New Laos National Stadium, Laos (A) | 2011 AFF U-16 Youth Championship | Adam 72' |
| July 15 | Timor-Leste U-16 | 3–1 (W) | New Laos National Stadium, Laos (A) | 2011 AFF U-16 Youth Championship | Akram 11' Adam 34' Zahin 70' |

== League tables ==
=== Super League ===
A total of fourteen teams participated in the league, including twelve sides from the 2010 season and two promoted teams from the 2010 Malaysia Premier League.

Johor FA and Penang FA were relegated at the end of the 2010 Super League Malaysia after finishing the season in the bottom two places of the league table.

2010 Malaysia Premier League champions Felda United FC and runners-up Sabah FA secured direct promotion to the Super League.

Harimau Muda A secured a place in the Super League after KL Plus withdrew. Harimau had won the 2009 Premier League Malaysia before playing the 2010 campaign in the Slovak First League. Harimau represent the Malaysian Under 21 national football team.

| Pos | Team | Pld | W | D | L | GF | GA | GD | Pts | Qualification or relegation |
|---|---|---|---|---|---|---|---|---|---|---|
| 1 | Kelantan (C) | 26 | 17 | 5 | 4 | 52 | 21 | +31 | 56 | Qualification to AFC Cup group stage (Note: Terengganu qualified for the AFC Cup group stage by winning the 2011 Malaysia FA Cup. They automatically advanced to the group stage due to restructuring of the East Zone playoffs.) |
| 2 | Terengganu | 26 | 16 | 5 | 5 | 54 | 26 | +28 | 53 | Qualification to AFC Cup group stage |
| 3 | Selangor | 26 | 16 | 4 | 6 | 42 | 24 | +18 | 52 | |
| 4 | Kedah | 26 | 13 | 6 | 7 | 25 | 20 | +5 | 45 | |
| 5 | Harimau Muda A | 26 | 12 | 7 | 7 | 38 | 28 | +10 | 43 | |
| 6 | Perak | 26 | 10 | 10 | 6 | 31 | 24 | +7 | 40 | |
| 7 | Johor FC | 26 | 8 | 10 | 8 | 26 | 28 | −2 | 34 | |
| 8 | Negeri Sembilan | 26 | 8 | 8 | 10 | 29 | 32 | −3 | 32 | |
| 9 | T–Team | 26 | 9 | 4 | 13 | 35 | 40 | −5 | 31 | |
| 10 | Sabah | 26 | 7 | 7 | 12 | 24 | 32 | −8 | 28 | |
| 11 | Felda United | 26 | 7 | 7 | 12 | 22 | 34 | −12 | 28 | |
| 12 | Kuala Lumpur | 26 | 6 | 8 | 12 | 23 | 34 | −11 | 26 | |
| 13 | Pahang (R) | 26 | 5 | 7 | 14 | 19 | 36 | −17 | 22 | Relegation to Premier League |
| 14 | Perlis (R) | 26 | 2 | 4 | 20 | 20 | 61 | −41 | 10 | Relegation to Premier League |

Updated to match(es) played on unknown. Source: FIFA
Rules for classification: 1) Points; 2) Goal difference; 3) Number of goals scored.
(C) Champions; (R) Relegated
Notes:

Notes

- PLUS withdrew from Super League before the start of 2011 season

=== Premier League ===
A total of twelve teams participated in the league, including eight sides from the 2010 Malaysia Premier League season, two newly promoted teams from 2010 Malaysia FAM Cup and two relegated teams from the 2010 Super League Malaysia season.

Johor FA and Penang FA were relegated from 2010 Malaysia Premier League after finishing the season in the bottom two places of the league table. There was a plan to merge Johor FA and Johor FC so that Johor FA can still compete at the Malaysia's top league, Malaysia Super League. The plan was drop due to unknown reason.

2010 Malaysia FAM Cup champions Sime Darby FC and runners-up Sinar Dimaja Mai Sarah FC secured direct promotion to the Malaysia Premier League.

| Pos | Team | Pld | W | D | L | GF | GA | GD | Pts | Qualification or relegation |
|---|---|---|---|---|---|---|---|---|---|---|
| 1 | PKNS | 22 | 18 | 3 | 1 | 51 | 7 | +44 | 57 | Promoted to Malaysia Super League |
| 2 | Sarawak | 22 | 15 | 3 | 4 | 51 | 16 | +35 | 48 | Promoted to Malaysia Super League |
| 3 | PDRM | 22 | 12 | 3 | 7 | 36 | 28 | +8 | 39 | |
| 4 | Johor | 22 | 11 | 3 | 8 | 37 | 25 | +12 | 36 | |
| 5 | Sime Darby | 22 | 10 | 5 | 7 | 22 | 12 | +10 | 35 | |
| 6 | USM | 22 | 11 | 2 | 9 | 32 | 30 | +2 | 35 | |
| 7 | ATM | 22 | 9 | 7 | 6 | 26 | 22 | +4 | 34 | |
| 8 | MP Muar | 22 | 8 | 4 | 10 | 29 | 42 | −13 | 28 | |
| 9 | Pos Malaysia | 22 | 7 | 6 | 9 | 26 | 36 | −10 | 27 | |
| 10 | Harimau Muda B | 22 | 5 | 5 | 12 | 24 | 28 | −4 | 20 | |
| 11 | SDMS Kepala Batas | 22 | 3 | 2 | 17 | 22 | 63 | −41 | 11 | Relegated to Malaysia FAM League |
| 12 | Penang | 22 | 1 | 1 | 20 | 14 | 61 | −47 | 4 | Relegated to Malaysia FAM League |

Source: Rec.Sport.Soccer Statistics Foundation
Rules for classification: 1) Points; 2) Goal difference; 3) Number of goals scored.

=== FAM League ===
A total of eleven teams participated in the league, including four sides from the 2010 Malaysia FAM Cup season, two relegated teams from the 2010 Malaysia Premier League season and featuring 5 new teams which two teams that won the National Region Play Off and three newly created teams which is Tentera Darat FC, TUDM Hornet FC and Kor RAMD FC.

SDMS Kepala Batas FC and Malacca FA were relegated from 2010 Malaysia Premier League after finishing the season in the bottom two places of the league table. National Region Play Off champions, Betaria FC and Rapid KL FC secured direct promotion to the Malaysia Premier League.

| Pos | Team | Pld | W | D | L | GF | GA | GD | Pts | Promotion |
|---|---|---|---|---|---|---|---|---|---|---|
| 1 | Negeri Sembilan Betaria FC | 20 | 14 | 3 | 3 | 49 | 26 | +23 | 45 | Promotion to 2012 Malaysia Premier League |
| 2 | Johor MBJB FC | 20 | 12 | 5 | 3 | 37 | 24 | +13 | 41 | Promotion to 2012 Malaysia Premier League |
| 3 | Tentera Darat F.A. | 20 | 10 | 5 | 5 | 45 | 29 | +16 | 35 | |
| 4 | Shahzan Muda FC | 20 | 9 | 8 | 3 | 37 | 22 | +15 | 35 | |
| 5 | Kuala Lumpur Rapid FC | 20 | 9 | 5 | 6 | 37 | 24 | +13 | 32 | Withdrew from FAM League. |
| 6 | Malacca FA | 20 | 7 | 5 | 8 | 45 | 40 | +5 | 26 | |
| 7 | UiTM FC | 20 | 5 | 9 | 6 | 27 | 27 | 0 | 24 | |
| 8 | Kuala Lumpur SPA FC | 20 | 6 | 6 | 8 | 31 | 36 | −5 | 24 | |
| 9 | Kor RAMD FC | 20 | 7 | 3 | 10 | 27 | 33 | −6 | 24 | Withdrew from FAM League. |
| 10 | TUDM Hornet FC | 20 | 2 | 3 | 15 | 14 | 45 | −31 | 9 | Withdrew from FAM League. |
| 11 | Johor Melodi Jaya Sports Club | 20 | 1 | 4 | 15 | 15 | 58 | −43 | 7 | |

Updated to match(es) played on 22 May 2011. Source: Malaysia Football Dimos
Rules for classification: 1) points; 2) goal difference; 3) number of goals scored.

=== President Cup ===
The final was played at Sultan Mohammad IV Stadium, Kelantan on Tuesday, 26 July 2011.

Tuesday, 26 July
8:45 GMT

| Kelantan FA | 2 – 1 (a.e.t.) | (Johor) MP Muar FC |
|---|---|---|
| Aris Zaidi 8'; Izuan Rosli 93' | Report | Nor Hakim Hassan 22' |

Sultan Mohammad IV Stadium, Kelantan
Attendance: 6,000

== Domestic Cups ==
=== Charity Shield ===
The 2011 edition was played at Shah Alam Stadium, Selangor on Saturday, 29 January 2011.

Saturday 29 January
8:45 GMT

| Selangor FA | 0 – 2 | Kelantan FA |
|---|---|---|
| | Report | Norshahrul 8' (pen.); Badri Radzi 73' |

Shah Alam Stadium, Selangor
Attendance: 40,000

Malaysia Charity Shield 2011 winner

1st Charity Shield title

=== FA Cup ===
The final was played at National Stadium, Bukit Jalil, Kuala Lumpur, on Saturday, 11 June 2011.

Saturday 11 June
8:45 GMT

| Terengganu FA | 2 – 1 (a.e.t.) | Kelantan FA |
|---|---|---|
| Jamaluddin 90+8' (o.g.); Nordin Alias 110' | | Azwan Roya 79' |

National Stadium, Bukit Jalil, Kuala Lumpur
Attendance: 87,500
Referee: Subkhiddin Mohd Salleh

Malaysia FA Cup 2011 winner

2nd FA cup title

=== Malaysia Cup ===
The final was played at the Shah Alam Stadium, Selangor, on Saturday, 29 October 2011. The original venue was the National Stadium, Bukit Jalil, but the Football Association of Malaysia were forced to change the venue because the national stadium were undergoing repairs on the stadium's roof.

29 October 2011
20:45

| Terengganu FA | 1 – 2 | Negeri Sembilan FA |
|---|---|---|
| Mohd Ashaari Shamsuddin 59' | Report | S. Kunalan 81'; Hairuddin Omar 86' |

Shah Alam Stadium, Shah Alam, Selangor
Attendance: 60,000
Referee: (Malaysia) Mohd Shokri Nor

Malaysia Cup 2011 winner

3rd Malaysia Cup title
