= List of football clubs in Malaysia by major honours won =

This article lists Malaysia football clubs that have won at least one recognised major domestic or continental honour. Only top-tier league championships, major national cup competitions, and official Asian Football Confederation (AFC) titles are included. Lower-division titles, youth competitions, minor tournaments, and runner-up finishes are excluded.

== Criteria ==
The following competitions are considered major honours

=== Domestic ===
- First Division – Liga Malaysia, Liga Semi-Pro Divisyen 1, Liga Perdana, Liga Perdana 1, and Malaysia Super League
- Malaysia FA Cup
- Malaysia Cup
- Malaysia Charity Shield

=== Continental ===
- Asian Club Championship/AFC Champions League Elite
- AFC Cup/AFC Champions League II

=== Exclusions ===
- Second, third and fourth divisions
- Youth, reserve, amateur and regional leagues
- Defunct minor tournaments
- Runner-up, group-stage or appearance records
- Titles not recognised by FAM or AFC

== Records ==
Clubs in bold compete in Malaysia Super League as of the 2025–26 season.

Rank	Club	First Division	Malaysia FA Cup	Malaysia Cup	Malaysia Charity Shield	Domestic Total	AFC Champions League Elite/ Asian Club Championship	AFC Cup/ AFC Champions League II	Continental Total	Overall Total
1	**Selangor**	6	5	33	8	52	–	–	0	52
2	**Johor Darul Ta’zim**	12	5	5	10	32	–	**1**	**1**	33
3	Singapore	2	–	24	1	27	–	–	0	27
4	Kedah Darul Aman	3	5	5	3	16	–	–	0	16
5	Perak	2	2	8	3	15	–	–	0	15
6	Sri Pahang	5	3	4	3	15	–	–	0	15
7	**Kuala Lumpur City**	2	3	4	3	12	–	–	0	12
8	**Penang**	3	1	4	1	9	–	–	0	9
9	Kelantan	2	2	2	1	7	–	–	0	7
10	**Negeri Sembilan**	1	2	3	1	7	–	–	0	7
11	(Johor) JDT II	2	-	2	1	5	–	–	0	5
12	Perlis	1	–	2	2	5	–	–	0	5
13	**Terengganu**	–	2	1	1	4	–	–	0	4
14	Sarawak	1	1	–	1	3	–	–	0	3
15	**Sabah**	1	1	–	–	2	–	–	0	2
16	(Singapore) LionsXII	1	1	–	–	2	–	–	0	2
17	(Selangor) MPPJ FC	–	1	–	1	2	–	–	0	2
18	(Malacca) Melaka United	1	–	–	–	1	–	–	0	1
19	Brunei	–	–	1	–	1	–	–	0	1
20	(Malaysia) Armed Forces	–	–	–	1	1	–	–	0	1

=== Notes ===
- Singapore FA representative teams competed in Malaysian domestic competitions from 1921 to 1994.
- Brunei FA representative teams competed in Malaysian domestic competitions from 1979 to 2005.
- LionsXII Singaporean representative teams competed in Malaysian domestic competitions from 2012 to 2015.
- Domestic totals include only recognised senior competitions organised by FAM.
- Continental totals include only championships won in AFC competitions.
- Clubs with no titles in the listed competitions are excluded.

== See also ==
- History of Malaysian football
- Football in Malaysia
