= Football in Malaysia =

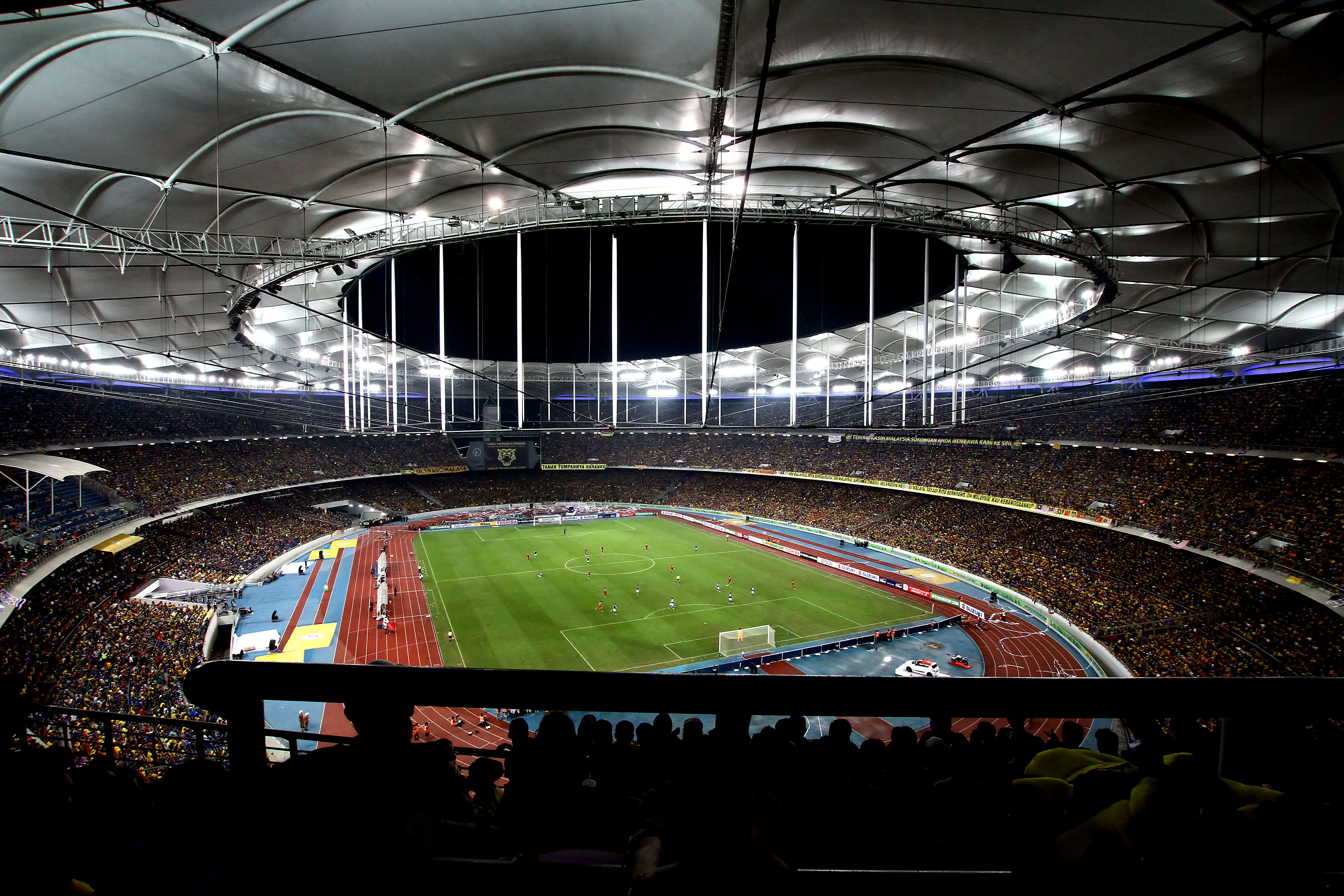
- The Malaysia national team playing at Bukit Jalil National Stadium during 2014 AFF Championship
- Governing body: FAM
- First played: Late 1800s

National competitions
- Piala FA; Piala Malaysia; MFL Cup (until 2025); MFL Challenge Cup; Piala Sumbangsih; Piala Emas Raja-Raja; Malaysia Futsal Cup (futsal)

Club competitions
- Liga Super; Liga Premier (until 2022); Liga A1; Liga A2; Liga A3; Malaysia Premier Futsal League; MPFL Division 2

International competitions
- AFC Champions League Elite; AFC Champions League Two; FIFA World Cup; Asian Cup; AFC Futsal Asian Cup; AFC Futsal Club Championship; AFC Beach Soccer Asian Cup; FIFA Beach Soccer World Cup; AFF Beach Soccer Championship; ASEAN Club Championship; AFF Futsal Championship; AFF Futsal Club Championship

Football is the most popular sport in Malaysia, where it is governed by the Football Association of Malaysia. According to a Nielsen survey, approximately 53% of the people in Malaysia are football fans. Most football fans in Malaysia are of Malay ethnicity.

In 1997, Malaysia hosted the FIFA U-20 World Cup, also known as the FIFA World Youth Championship during that time. In 2007, Malaysia co-hosted the Asian Cup 2007 with three other countries.

== History ==
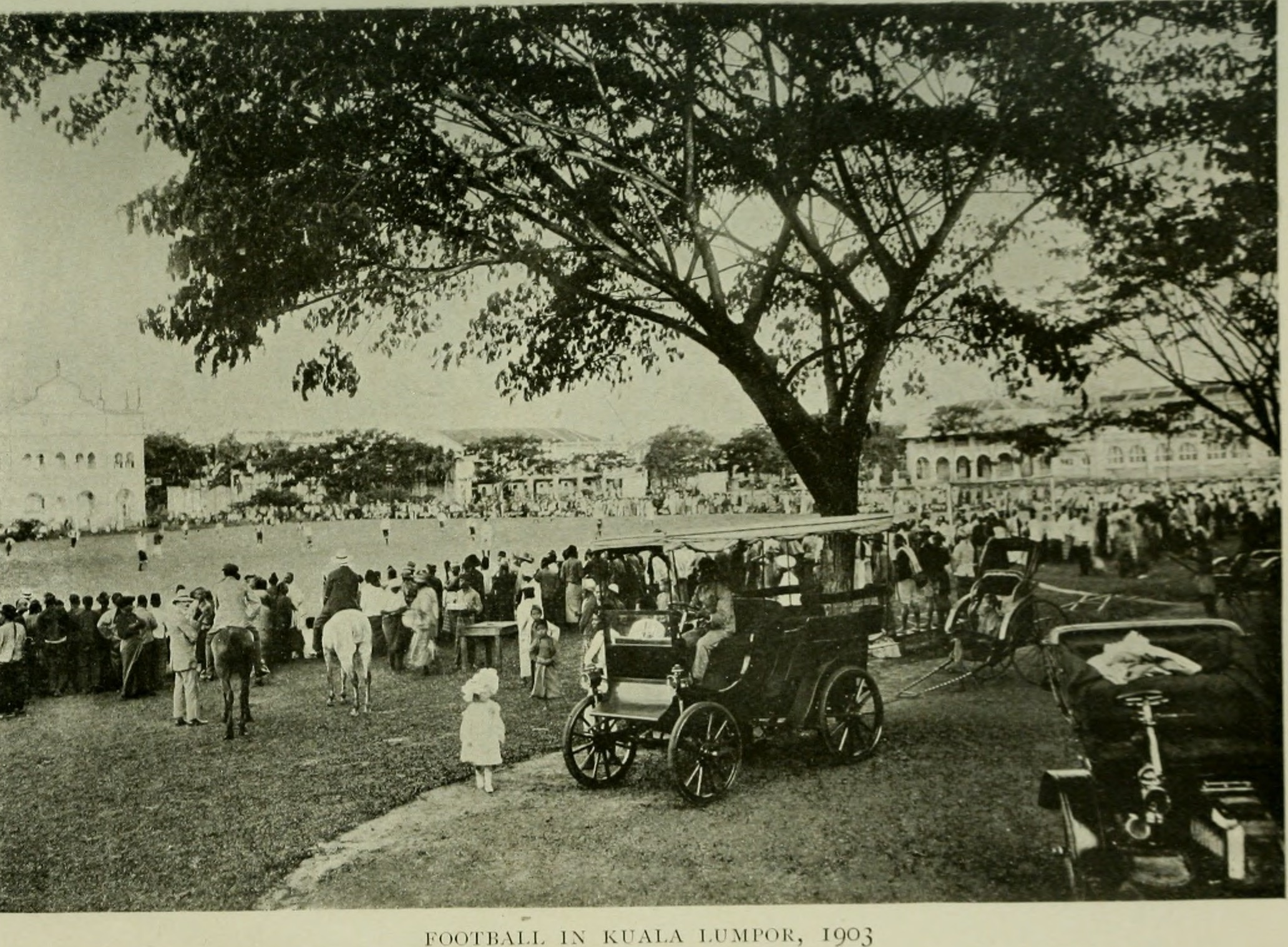
Football match in British Malaya's capital of Kuala Lumpur, c. 1903.

Football arrived in Malaysia (then known as Malaya) with the British. The locals soon picked up the game, and before long, it was the country's leading sport. At the end of the 19th century, football was a part of most sports clubs in Malaya, but it did not yet have any structured competitions. Even when the Selangor Amateur Football League took shape in 1905 – which ensured proper administration and organisation – the competition was confined only to clubs in Kuala Lumpur.

In January 1921, the British Royal Navy battleship HMS Malaya called at various Malaysian ports. During its stay, the crew competed in friendly matches of football and other sports.

Three months later, the Chief Secretary of the Federated Malay States government received a letter from Captain H. T. Buller of the H. M. S. Malaya, which offered two cups to be competed for in football and rugby as tokens of their gratitude for the reception they received in Malaya. The cup for football was then known as the Malaya Cup. The offer was accepted, and various club representatives met to organise the tournament. A Malaya Cup committee was set up, and it was decided to run the football competition in northern and southern sections. The first tournament was entrusted to be run by the Selangor Club. The first ever Malaya Cup match was played on 20 August 1921, with Selangor defeating Penang 5–1 in front of an estimated crowd of 5,000 in Kuala Lumpur. The inaugural tournament was played by six teams and won by Singapore. During 1923, a newspaper described it as “by far the greatest sporting event of the year (in Malaya)”.

Football began to spread rapidly throughout the region following the establishment of the Cup, although the composition of the teams at the time was mainly based on ethnic background. In British Borneo, football had also become the most popular choice of sport in Malay schools.

In 1933, Association football of Malaysia was founded as Football Association of Malaysia (FAM) which managed the local football scene at that time. By 1954, FAM joined FIFA as a member of the AFC.

Malaysia FAM Cup was established in 1952 as a secondary knockout competition to the more prestigious Malaya Cup. The competition was held between state teams including Singapore, Police, Army, and Prisons Department of Malaysia in its early days.

In 1959, the Malaya Cup departed from the traditional one-round tournament to a two-round home and away format in three zones: East, South and North. A new trophy was inaugurated in 1967, and since then, the competition has been known as the Piala Malaysia.

Starting in 1974, state teams were barred from entering the FAM Cup competition, and only club sides could enter.

This football league competition involving the representative sides of the state football associations was first held in Malaysia in 1979. When it began, it was intended primarily as a qualifying tournament for the final knock-out stages of the Piala Malaysia. A one-round league competition was introduced in Malaysia in 1979. The top four teams at the end of the league will face off in two semi-finals before the winners make it to the finals. In 1981, the quarter-finals stage were introduced. When the league began, it was intended primarily as a qualifying tournament for the Piala Malaysia. However, it was not until 1982 that a League Cup was introduced to recognise the winners of the preliminary stage as the league champions, which then officially started the era of nationwide-level amateur football league in Malaysia. Since then, the Piala Malaysia has been held after the conclusion of the league each year, with only the best-performing teams in the league qualifying for the Piala Malaysia.

Over the years, the league competition has gained important stature in its own right. From 1982 until 1988, the league was an amateur status and continued its purpose as a qualifying round for Piala Malaysia, and only in 1989 did it change to a new format as the Malaysian Semi-Pro Football League (Liga Semi-Pro) by FAM as a 'halfway house' towards full professional status.

Initially, the only teams allowed to participate in the league were the state FA's sides, teams representing the Armed Forces and the Police, and teams representing the neighbouring countries of Singapore and Brunei (though the Football Association of Singapore pulled out of the Malaysian League after the 1994 season following a dispute with the Football Association of Malaysia over gate receipts and has not been involved since).

The inaugural season of Liga Semi-Pro consisted of nine teams in Division 1 and eight teams in Division 2 with a total of 17 teams participating. The Malaysian Police joined Division 2 in 1990. Games were played on a home and away basis for about four months, roughly between the end of April or early May and the end of August or early September. Under the new format, only the top six teams in Division 1 and the Division 2 champions and runners-up will be involved in the Piala Malaysia. Piala Malaysia was played in the quarter-final stage, scheduled for November after the league was finished. The Piala Malaysia quarter-final and semi-final matches will be played on a home and away basis.

In 1992, FAM created another amateur league for local clubs in Malaysia to compete in, which is called the Liga Nasional. The league was managed by FAM outside entity, Super Club Sdn. Bhd. Some of the clubs that compete in the league are Hong Chin, Muar FA, PKNK from Kedah, DBKL, PKNS, BSN, LPN, BBMB, Proton, PPC and PKENJ. Unfortunately, the league only ran for one season before it folded. Some of the clubs then evolved and joined the main league, such as PKENJ, which became JCorp and is now JDT.

With the advent of the two-league Liga Semi-Pro in 1989, the FAM Cup became the third-tier competition. In 1993, the format of the competition was changed to include a two-group league, followed by the traditional knockout format. Promotion to the professional Malaysian League was introduced for the first time in 1997, with Johor FC and NS Chempaka FC the first two sides to be promoted that year.

Liga Semi-Pro was the nation's top-tier league until it was succeeded by the formation of Malaysia's first professional football league, the Liga Perdana in 1994 by the Football Association of Malaysia.

In 1998, Liga Perdana was divided into two divisions consisting of Liga Perdana 1 and Liga Perdana 2. During this time both of the division was still just referred as Malaysian League as a whole.

During 1998, Liga Perdana 1 consisted of 12 teams, while Liga Perdana 2 had 8 teams. 10 teams that previously qualified for Piala Malaysia, which played in the 1997 Liga Premier, were automatically qualified for Liga Perdana 1. The other two spots were filled by a playoff round between the 5 lowest teams in the 1997 Liga Premier and the Malaysian Olympic football team. The lowest four teams from the playoff round were then put into Liga Perdana 2 alongside Police, Malaysia Military, Negeri Sembilan Chempaka F.C., and PKN Johor. At this time, the league still consisted of a semi-pro team, where each team was allowed to register 25 players, with 12 players being professionals in Liga Perdana 1 and a minimum of six professional players in Liga Perdana 2.

Both leagues continued until 2003, when Football Association of Malaysia (FAM) decided to privatise the league for the 2004 season onwards, when the Liga Super was formed. Teams in Liga Perdana 1 and Liga Perdana 2 were then put through a qualification and playoff to be promoted into Liga Super. Teams that failed the qualification were put into a new second-tier league Liga Premier.

Further changes were made to the Malaysia FAM Cup in 2008 when the knockout stages were abolished and the double round-robin league format was introduced. The tournament is now known as the Malaysia FAM League.

The most significant successes of the national team of Malaysia have come in the regional AFF Suzuki Cup (formerly known as the 'Tiger Cup'), which Malaysia won in 2010 for the first time in history. They beat Indonesia 42 on aggregate in the final to capture the country's first major international football title.

Malaysia had top players, such as the Mokhtar Dahari and Sabah's Hassan Sani and James Wong, which led Malaysia into their golden age from the 1970s until the 1980s. Before Mokhtar, The Malaysian King of Football, Datuk Abdul Ghani Minhat was the most famous and respected footballer in the whole of Malaya from the 1950s until the 1960s. Malaysia's 15–1 victory over the Philippines in 1962 is currently the record for the highest win for the national team. In the current generation, Mohd Safee Mohd Sali and Norshahrul Idlan Talaha are considered by Malaysians to be their best striker pair.

In the FIFA World Rankings, Malaysia's highest standing was in the first release of the figures, in August 1993, at 75th. Malaysia's main rivals on the international stage are their geographical neighbours, Indonesia and Singapore, and past matches between these two teams have produced much drama. Malaysia is one of the most successful teams in Southeast Asia along with Indonesia, Singapore, Thailand and Vietnam, winning the ASEAN Football Championship 2010 and other small competitions while improving at the same time.

== Cup competitions ==
There are several cup competitions for clubs at different levels of the football pyramid. The two major cup competitions are the Malaysia FA Cup and the Malaysia Cup.

=== Domestic cup competitions ===
- The Malaysia Cup, first held in 1921, is the oldest national cup competition in Asia. Only qualified teams from the top 2 levels of the football pyramid can enter.
- The Piala Presiden is the developmental football competition in Malaysia for under-21 players. Since its inception, in 1985, the Piala Presiden has been the major tournament for under-21 and under-23 players. In 2009, the format of the competition was changed with only under-20 players eligible to be fielded for the tournament. In 2015 the competition reverted to the original format with under-21 players and three over age players eligible to play.
- The Piala Belia is the developmental competition for under-18 players. Since its inception in 2008 to 2011, the competition was combined with Piala Presiden. In 2015 the format of the competition changed to the league format.
- The Malaysia Challenge Cup, first held in 2018, is for teams that failed to qualify for the Malaysia Cup from the top 2 levels of the football pyramid.
- The Malaysia FA Cup, first held in 1990, is a national cup competition in the world. Teams from all levels of the football pyramid may enter.
- The Piala Sumbangsih (also known as Piala Sultan Haji Ahmad Shah) is a single match Charity Cup played between the Malaysia Cup winners and the Super League champions at the start of a Super league and Premier League season.

=== International cup competitions ===
- Pestabola Merdeka is held to honour the Independence Day. The competition is Asia's oldest football tournament which invited football playing nations to compete since 1957.

== Qualification for Asian competitions ==
Clubs who do well in either the Super League, Piala FA or League Cup can qualify to compete in various AFC-organised Asian-wide competitions in the following season. The number of Malaysia teams playing in Asian in any one season can range from three to four. Currently, Malaysia is awarded the following places in Asian competitions:

Competition	Allocated slot	Qualifier	Notes
AFC Champions League Elite	1	Malaysia Super League champions	
AFC Champions League Two	2	Malaysia FA Cup Winner Malaysia Super League runners-up	If Malaysia FA Cup were cancelled, either the Malaysian Cup winner or the third highest eligible Team in the Super League will enter
ASEAN Club Championship	2	Malaysia Super League third place Malaysia Super League fourth place	

== National teams ==
The Malaysia national football team represents Malaysia in international football. Malaysia is one of the national teams to have won the AFF Suzuki Cup as its currently highest international result. Other highest international result is winning bronze at the Asian Games in 1974, defeating North Korea.

== Women's football ==
Women's football competitions are also managed by FAM. Malaysia women's football national team represents Malaysia in international women's football.

In local football scene, a woman football competition has been held in Malaysia since 1960. The inaugural season was competed by four teams from Perak, Selangor, Negeri Sembilan and Malacca. A competition trophy has only been introduced in 1961 which has been contributed by Straits Times.

Women Football Association of Malaysia (PBWM) was officially registered in December 1974 where the first president was the Tun Sharifah Rodziah. A proper tournament was officially held in 1976 when PBWM introduced the woman football tournament called the Piala Tun Sharifah Rodziah. A new trophy was contributed by the Tunku Abdul Rahman for the inaugural tournament season. The cup format was following the Piala Malaysia format at that year where a home and away match was introduced for the tournament. A total eight teams compete including Johor, Melaka, Negeri Sembilan, Selangor, Pahang, Perak, Penang and Singapore.

The cup was held for consistent basis until 2004 when it was not held for 11 years and making a comeback in 2015 for the 28 edition. A total of ten teams participated in the revival season of the tournament. The 2015 season was won by MIFA. In 2016, MISC-MIFA defended their championship by winning the cup again for the second times.

== Stadiums ==
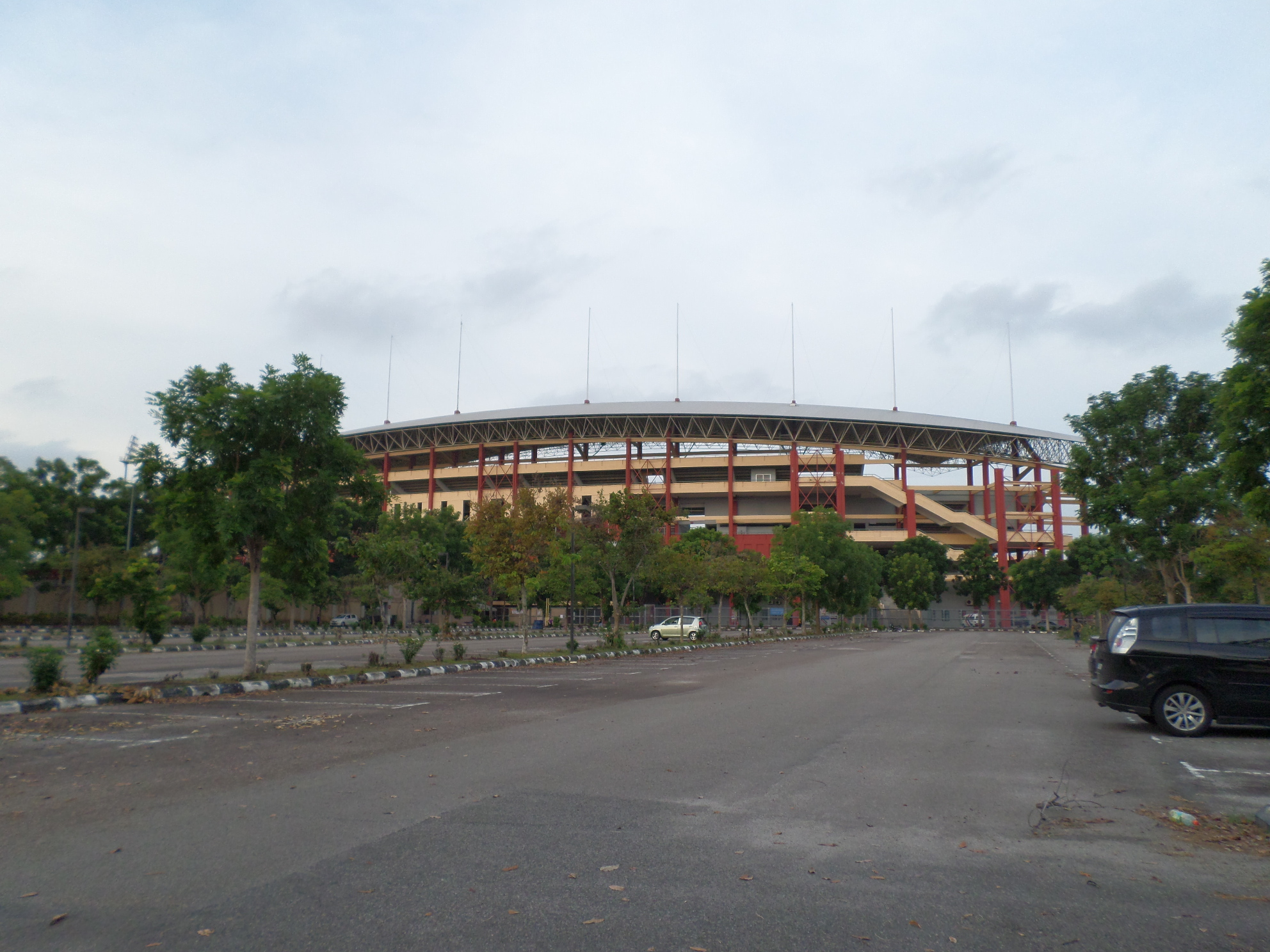
Hang Jebat Football Stadium in Melaka.

Some of the major stadium used for various team in Malaysia League listed as follow:

- Bukit Jalil Stadium
- Shah Alam Stadium
- City Stadium (Penang)
- Merdeka Stadium
- Ipoh Stadium
- Hang Tuah Stadium
- Hang Jebat Stadium
- Sultan Ibrahim Stadium
- Sultan Mohammad IV Stadium
- Darul Aman Stadium
- Darul Makmur Stadium
- Sarawak Stadium
- Sultan Mizan Zainal Abidin Stadium
- Tun Abdul Razak Stadium

== Seasons ==
The following articles detail the major results and events in each season since 1921, when the first organised competition, the Malaya Cup, was created. Seasons in italics are wartime seasons, when official national competition was suspended, although regional football continued.

1920s:	1921	1922	1923	1924	1925	1926	1927	1928	1929	1930
1930s:	1931	1932	1933	1934	1935	1936	1937	1938	1939	1940
1940s:	1941	1942	1943	1944	1945	1946	1947	1948	1949	1950
1950s:	1951	1952	1953	1954	1955	1956	1957	1958	1959	1960
1960s:	1961	1962	1963	1964	1965	1966	1967	1968	1969	1970
1970s:	1971	1972	1973	1974	1975	1976	1977	1978	1979	1980
1980s:	1981	1982	1983	1984	1985	1986	1987	1988	1989	1990
1990s:	1991	1992	1993	1994	1995	1996	1997	1998	1999	2000
2000s:	2001	2002	2003	2004	2005	2006	2007	2008	2009	2010
2010s:	2011	2012	2013	2014	2015	2016	2017	2018	2019	2020

== Support ==
Manchester United, Liverpool, Arsenal and Chelsea are the four most popular Premier League clubs in Malaysia.

=== Polling ===
Statista (2016)
Club	%
(England) Chelsea	13%
(Malaysia) Johor Darul Ta'zim	22%
(Malaysia) Kelantan	14%
(England) Manchester United	23%
(Malaysia) Selangor	13%

== Attendances ==
The average attendance per top-flight football league season and the club with the highest average attendance:

Season	League average	Best club	Best club average
2024-25	3,725	Johor	14,095
2023	5,330	Johor	17,623
2022	4,723	Johor	16,484

Sources: League pages on Wikipedia

== See also ==
- List of Malaysia football champions
- List of football clubs in Malaysia
- List of football clubs in Malaysia by major honours won
- Malaysia national football team honours
- Malaysia Premier Futsal League
- Malaysia Premier Futsal League (Women)
- Malaysia national futsal team
- Malaysia women's national futsal team
- Malaysia national beach soccer team
