= Kelantan F.C. (women) =

- Founded: 2017; 9 years ago
- Ground: Sultan Muhammad IV Stadium; USM Mini Stadium
- Capacity: 22,000
- Manager: Arif Hassan
- Head coach: Abd Hamid Ramli
- League: Piala Tun Sharifah Rodziah
- 2017: Group Stage, 3rd
- Website: http://trwkelantanfc.com

Kelantan Football Club Women is a women's football team from Kota Bharu representing the state of Kelantan. Founded in 2017, the team competes in Piala Tun Sharifah Rodziah. 2017 is their debut appearance in the competition managed by the Football Association of Malaysia (FAM).

== History ==
The Kelantan Football Club Women team or Kelantan F.C. women's football team was formed in 2017 originally for the preparation of Tun Sharifah Rodziah Cup tournament. The team consist former Liga Bolasepak Rakyat Wanita players, who represented the club in state of Kelantan and others via players selection on 11 March 2017 at the University of Science, Malaysia Mini Stadium, Kubang Kerian. The 2017 Piala Tun Sharifah Rodziah tournament will be held in Miri, Sarawak starting 6 April until 16 April 2017. 12 teams have confirmed their participation in the tournament. During 2017 tournament, the teams were divided into three groups and Kelantan were drawn into Group C along with Sarawak, Pahang and Negeri Sembilan.

Kelantan women's team was not eligible for the knockout stage after two defeats and a draw in the group stage. They gained third-placed in the table with 1 goal and conceded 6 goals along the campaign. The only goal scored was during the draw against Negeri Sembilan by Siti Hajar Mat Zaid.

== Current squad ==
As of 8 April 2017.

Note: Flags indicate national team as defined under FIFA eligibility rules; some limited exceptions apply. Players may hold more than one non-FIFA nationality.

No.	Pos.	Nation	Player
1	GK	MAS	Norsyafiqah Yuza
2	MF	MAS	Farahana Muhamad
3	MF	MAS	Wan Helwani Fatimah Wan Abdullah
6	MF	MAS	Siti Noorhidayat Ghazali
7	MF	MAS	Salwani Selamat
8	DF	MAS	Lizawaty Abu Bakar (Captain)
9	FW	MAS	Nor Syardilla Samsul Khahar
10	DF	MAS	Siti Hajar Mat Zaid (Vice-captain)
11	MF	MAS	Hizra Nursyafiqa Zakaria

No.	Pos.	Nation	Player
12	DF	MAS	Shahiera Balqish Hamidi
13	FW	MAS	Siti Fakhira Bahrudin
14	DF	MAS	Che Mazni Che Manan
18	MF	MAS	Nur Aziyati Che Norddin
21	DF	MAS	Nur Athirah Abd Rahman
22	GK	MAS	Nur Aslinda Rozelan
25	FW	MAS	Fatin Fatihah Rezuan
26	GK	MAS	Zaliafa Ya'kob
29	MF	MAS	Nur Ain Najihah Arshad

== Piala Tun Sharifah Rodziah ==
Year	Round	Date	Team	Result	Scorers	Venue	Pos
2017	Group stage	8 April	Sarawak	2–0	—N/a	Miri Stadium, Sarawak	3rd
2017	Group stage	9 April	Negeri Sembilan	1–1	Siti Hajar Mat Zaid	Petroliam Recreation Club, Sarawak	3rd
2017	Group stage	10 April	Pahang	0–3	—N/a	Miri Stadium, Sarawak	3rd

== Goalscorer ==
No.	Pos	Player	Goal(s)
10	DF	Siti Hajar Mat Zaid	1

== Sponsors ==
Year	Shirt	Title
2017	(United States) Nike	Chengal Jati

== Staff ==
- Manager: Arif Hassan
- Assistant Manager: Md Salzihan Md Salleh
- Head Coach: Abd Hamid Ramli
- Assistant Coach: Mohd Afindi Ibrahim
- Physiotherapist: Anis Aliyya Mazuki
- Administrative Officer: Mohd Yuzmuhaimizee Yaacob

== Affiliate ==
- Kelantan F.C.
