= Wisma FAM =

Football training facility in Kelana Jaya, Malaysia

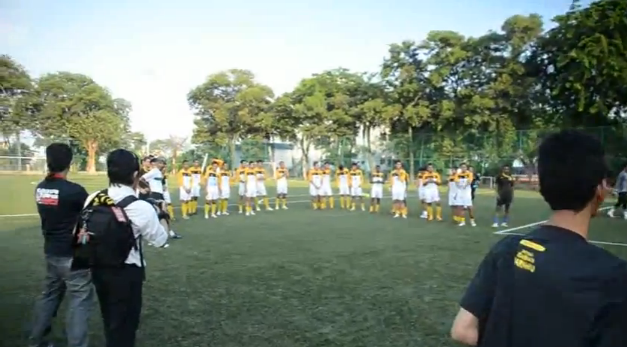
The Malaysia national football team training on the artificial turf pitch at Wisma FAM

Wisma FAM is a training facility and the main headquarters for the Football Association of Malaysia, located at Kelana Jaya, Selangor.

== History ==
Wisma FAM was established during the 1980s as the Football Association of Malaysia required a main headquarters and training ground for the Malaysia national football team. In that time, the Football Association of Malaysia headquarters were in various states. Wisma FAM is also used by the Women's, Olympic and national futsal team, among others.

== Matches ==
The Malaysia national teams friendly matches that Wisma FAM hosted:

22 December 2010	Malaysia	2 – 0	(Malaysia) Felda United FC	Artificial football pitch, Wisma FAM
	Ashaari 55'; Safee 89'

7 September 2011	Malaysia U-23	0 – 0	(Iraq) Arbil SC	Artificial football pitch, Wisma FAM
		Report

2 October 2011	Malaysia	3 – 0	Malaysia U-23^{1}	Artificial pitch, Wisma FAM
17:00 UTC+8	Norshahrul 36'; Baddrol 48'; Shahrizal 88'

6 October 2011	Malaysia U-23	4 – 2	(Malaysia) Selangor FA	Artificial pitch, Wisma FAM
17:00 UTC+8	Saarvindran 4'; Thamil Arasu 23'; See Kok Luen 80'; Hazwan Bakri 81'	Report	Azidan Sarudin 60'; Depan Sakwati 84'

== Facilities ==
Wisma FAM is equipped with the following facilities:

- office block, contains ticket booth and announcement room
- condo block, contains rooms for players and staff
- sport's gym
- swimming pool
- 1000 flux floodlights
- 650 flux floodlights
- 500 flux floodlights
- 42m long x 25m wide futsal pitch
- 45m x 90m artificial turf pitch

== See also ==
- Football Association of Malaysia
