= ASEAN Express =

Freight rail route in Asia

The ASEAN Express is a freight rail route linking Kelana Jaya, Selangor, Malaysia with Chongqing in Southwestern China, operated by Malaysian railway company Keretapi Tanah Melayu (KTM). It passes through Thailand and Laos before arriving in Chongqing. The inaugural train left the Kontena Nasional Inland Clearance Depot on 27 June 2024, and arrived in Chongqing on 11 July.

== Route ==
- Malaysia
  - Kontena Nasional Inland Clearance Depot
- Thailand
  - Latkrabang Inland Port
- Laos
  - Thanaleng Dry Port
- China
  - Chongqing

== Operators ==
The ASEAN Express is operated by KTMB, which plans to run two services per week between Kelana Jaya and Chongqing, eventually launching daily services.

== Customers and usage ==
The inaugural train transported a cargo of agricultural products and electrical appliances. Malaysian farmers expect to export fresh Durian to China via this route later in 2024.
