= Lord Buddha Education Foundation =

IT college in Kathmandu, Nepal

Lord Buddha Education Foundation (LBEF)
- LBEF CAMPUS

Location
- Opposite Maiti Devi Temple; Kathmandu 44600; Nepal

Information
- School type: College
- Motto: Education for All
- Founded: 1998
- Founder: Late Mr. Parmanand Kejriwal

Lord Buddha Education Foundation (LBEF) is an IT college at Maitidevi, Kathmandu, Nepal, the country's first. It is affiliated under Asia Pacific University of Technology and Innovation (Malaysia) and these courses are recognised by Tribhuvan University of Nepal. Founded in 1998, the LBEF, a non-profit, non-government organization, covers a broad range of academic disciplines. More than 10,000 students have over the years graduated from LBEF group of institutions.
