= Pos Malaysia =

National service courier provider of Malaysia

Pos Malaysia Berhad
- Trade name: Pos Malaysia
- Formerly: Pos Malaysia & Services Holdings; Jabatan Perkhidmatan Pos Tanah Melayu; Straits Settlements Post Office
- Type: Public limited government-linked company
- Traded as: MYX: 4634
- ISIN: MYL4634OO001
- Industry: Conglomerate
- Founded: 1826
- Headquarters: Kuala Lumpur, Malaysia
- Key people: Charles Brewer (group CEO)
- Products: Postal & courier services Convenience stores Aviation ground handling Logistics
- Revenue: ▼RM RM1.85 billion (2024)
- Operating income: ▼RM 386.9 million (2024)
- Net income: ▼RM −201.6 million (2024)
- Total assets: ▼RM 2.0 billion (2024)
- Total equity: ▼RM −297.6 million (2024)
- Number of employees: 16,307 (2024)
- Parent: DRB-HICOM
- Website: pos.com.my
- Footnotes; Financials are from annual report.

Pos Malaysia Berhad (d.b.a Pos Malaysia; English: Malaysian Post; MYX: 4634) is a Malaysian national postal and courier service provider headquartered at the Dayabumi Complex in Kuala Lumpur, Malaysia. The company although involved principally in postal and courier service operates as a diversified group involved in aviation, logistics and information technology. It was originally established as a government department in the early 1800s before being corporatised in 1992.

== History ==
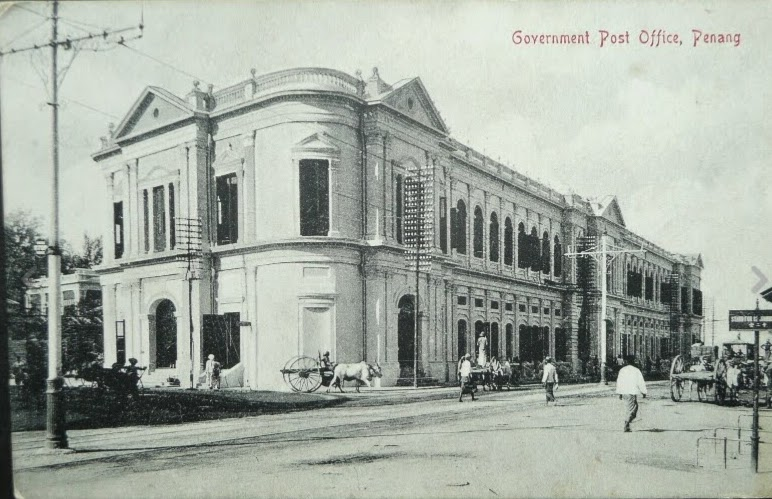
Penang Post Office Building around 1907.

=== Early postal services ===
The history of Pos Malaysia can be traced back to the early 1800s in the Straits Settlements with the establishment of postal services in Penang, Malacca and Singapore before expanding through the rest of Malaya by the early 20th century. Letters were then conveyed through dispatch riders or special messengers. Instead of postage stamps, fees were collected when letters were handed in at the Post Office. Letters posted were given a receipt.

The Federated Malay States Posts and Telegraphs Department was formally established on 1 January 1905 with the merger of postal and telegraph services of Perak, Selangor, Negeri Sembilan, and Pahang.

Postal services in the five Unfederated Malay States of Johor (1876), Kedah, Kelantan, Perlis, and Terengganu were individually established from 1876 until 1910 (The latter four were transferred from Siamese Administration). The Malayan Postal Union was established in 1935 that instituted universal postage rates for the Federated Malay States and the Straits Settlements.

=== Post War Reforms ===
During the Second World War, The Japanese Forces took control of the postal services under the Dai Nippon Postal Administration. Few years before the end of the War, jurisdiction of the four northern Malay States were transferred to the Thai Postal Administration. After the Japanese Occupation, the Unfederated Malay States were admitted to the Union. The Malayan Postal Union Agreement was revised and reissued in 1949, as the Postal Union of Malaya Agreement covering the Federation of Malaya and Singapore.

The union also started as a medium for the transmission of letters, newspapers, and business documents. The postal service soon evolved into a multiple services provider. It began to venture into parcel delivery, registrations, insurance service, transaction of money (postal order & money order), and investment of funds through the formation of the Post Office Savings Bank (Malay: Bank Simpanan Pejabat Pos).

The postal service, then known as the Malayan Postal Services Department (Malay: Jabatan Perkhidmatan Pos Tanah Melayu) after the independence of Malaya in 1957, also began to take over numerous services on behalf of the Government departments after the Second World War. It started to collect payment of electricity bills in 1946, sale of dog licences in 1949, payment of pensions in 1953, sale of highway code booklet from transport department in 1960 and the sale of television licence in 1964 and others.

Following the establishment of Malaysia on 16 September 1963, Malayan Postal Service was combined with those from Sabah (inherited from North Borneo since 1883), Sarawak (established in 1869) and Singapore under the newly formed Malaysian Postal Service Department, although Singapore's Postal Service would later separate again on 1966, a year after it gained independence when the newly established City State government took control from the Malaysian Federal Government.

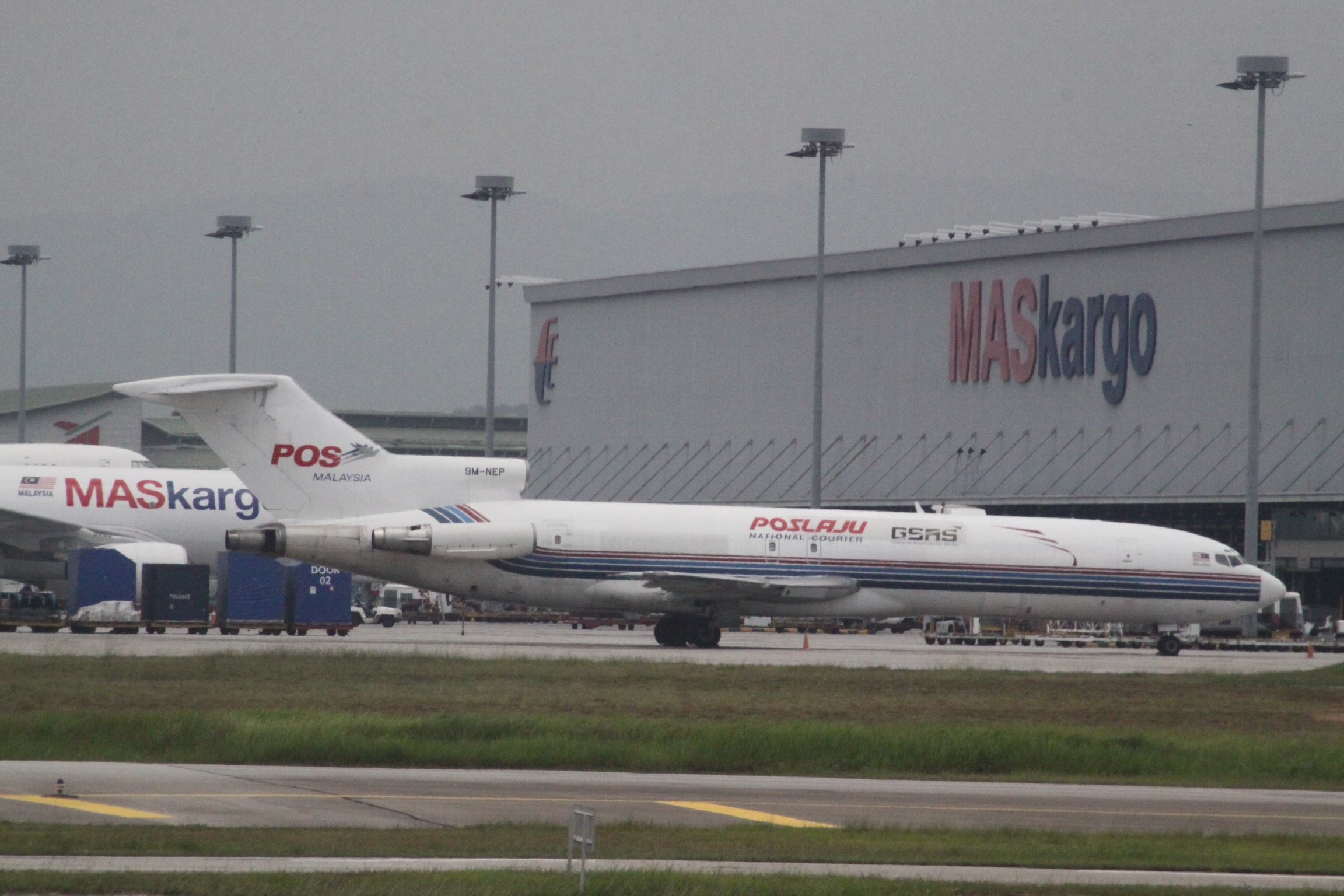
A Pos Aviation Boeing 727 Freighter (registration number 9M-NEP) operating under partnership with Gading Sari Aviation from 2007 to 2013. Picture taken on 28 March 2012.

=== Separation of Savings Bank Division ===
By the 1960s, the deposit in the Post Office Savings Banks suffered a decline due to rise of Commercial Bankings in urban areas. To ensure their relevance and competitiveness, the federal government (with the help of the Central Bank of Malaysia) decided to establish a new institution - the National Savings Bank (NSB) to replace the Post Office Savings Bank. Bank Simpanan Nasional was then incorporated on 1 December 1974 under the Bank Simpanan Nasional Act 1974, and the Savings Function was spun off from the Malaysian Postal Service Department. While the new branch offices of the national savings bank were only established sometime in the 1980s, the post office was continuing to perform its old savings collection functions, such as accepting deposits on behalf of the National Savings Bank only in rural areas and savings deposits in areas where no ATM facilities existed.

=== Privatisation ===
In line with the government's privatisation agenda, the Malaysian Postal Services Department operated the so-called "self-accounting" system after 1984, in which its funding and expenditure was independent from the government, except for a nominal budget allocation of RM10 from the government. On 12 September 1991, the Postal Services Act 1991 and the Postal Services (Successor Company) Act 1991 were passed in parliament, paving the way for the corporatisation of the department.

On 1 January 1992, the Malaysian Postal Services Department was corporatised as Pos Malaysia Berhad after which all the assets and liabilities that were attributable to postal services were vested in the newly established company pursuant to the Postal Services (Successor Company) Act 1991. By 28 August 2001, Pos Malaysia was listed on the Kuala Lumpur Stock Exchange through a reverse takeover of Phileo Allied Berhad.

== Services ==
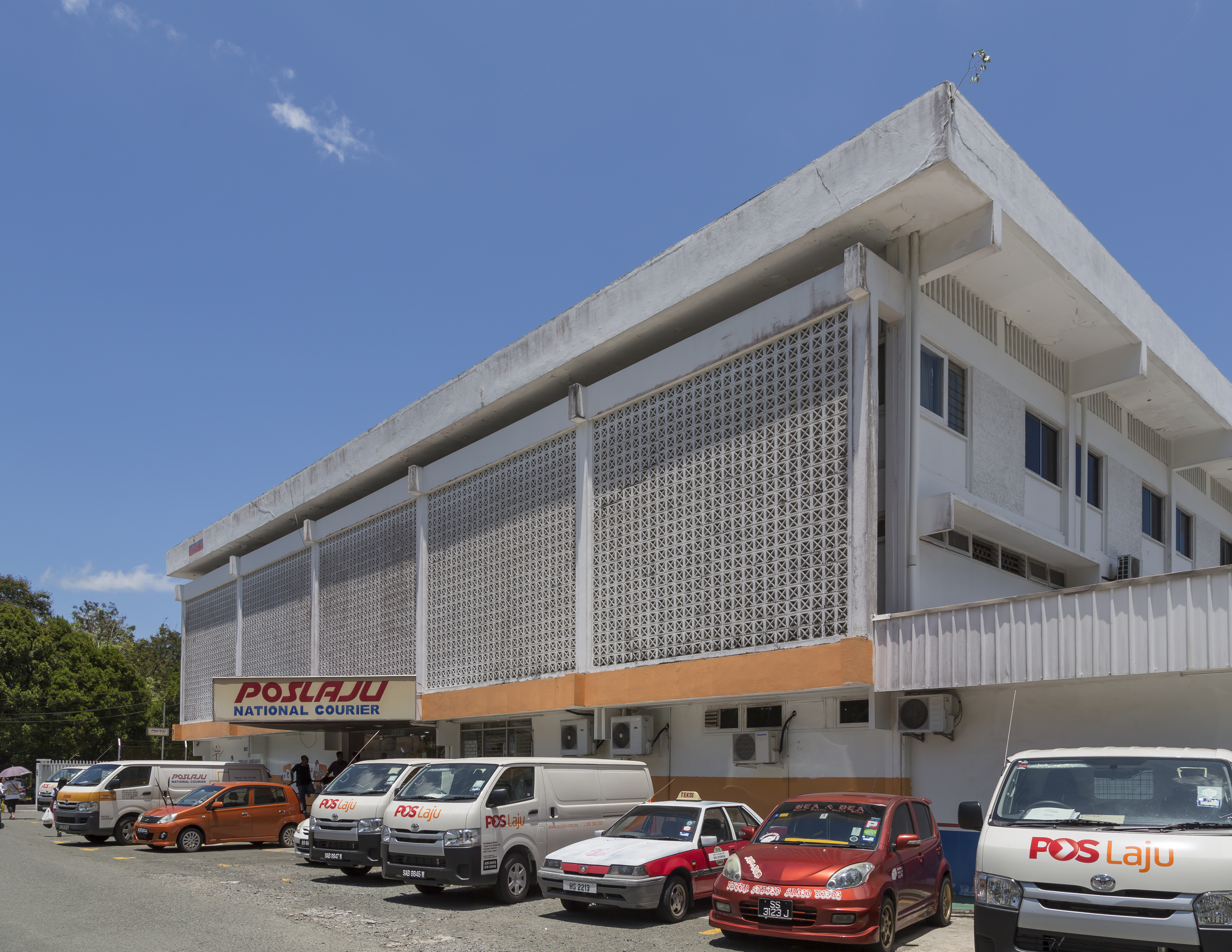
Sandakan Post Office

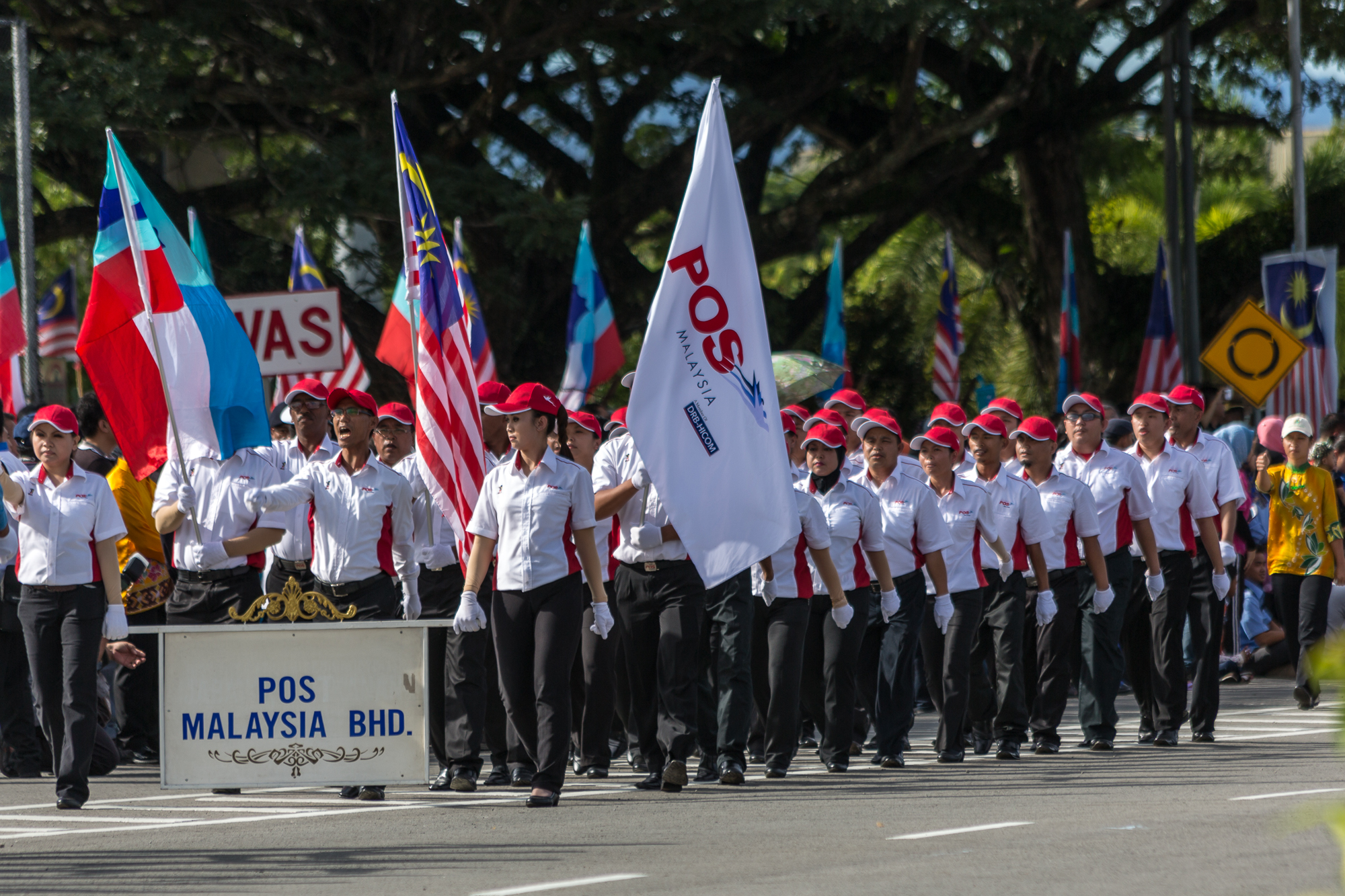
Pos Malaysia Sabah Delegates partaking in the 2013 Sabah State Level Independence Day celebrations.

=== Postal and courier ===
Postal and courier services is the principal activity of Pos Malaysia. It is the sole provider of mail services in Malaysia in accordance to the national universal postal service mandate under Postal Services Act 2012. The company provides postal services through brands such as Pos Mel and Pos Laju.

==== Pos Mel ====
Pos Mel is the postal arm of the firm, its services range from air mail, surface mail, standard mail, non-standard mail, postcards, registered mail and Mel Rakyat, a complimentary aerogramme provided for domestic non-commercial use.

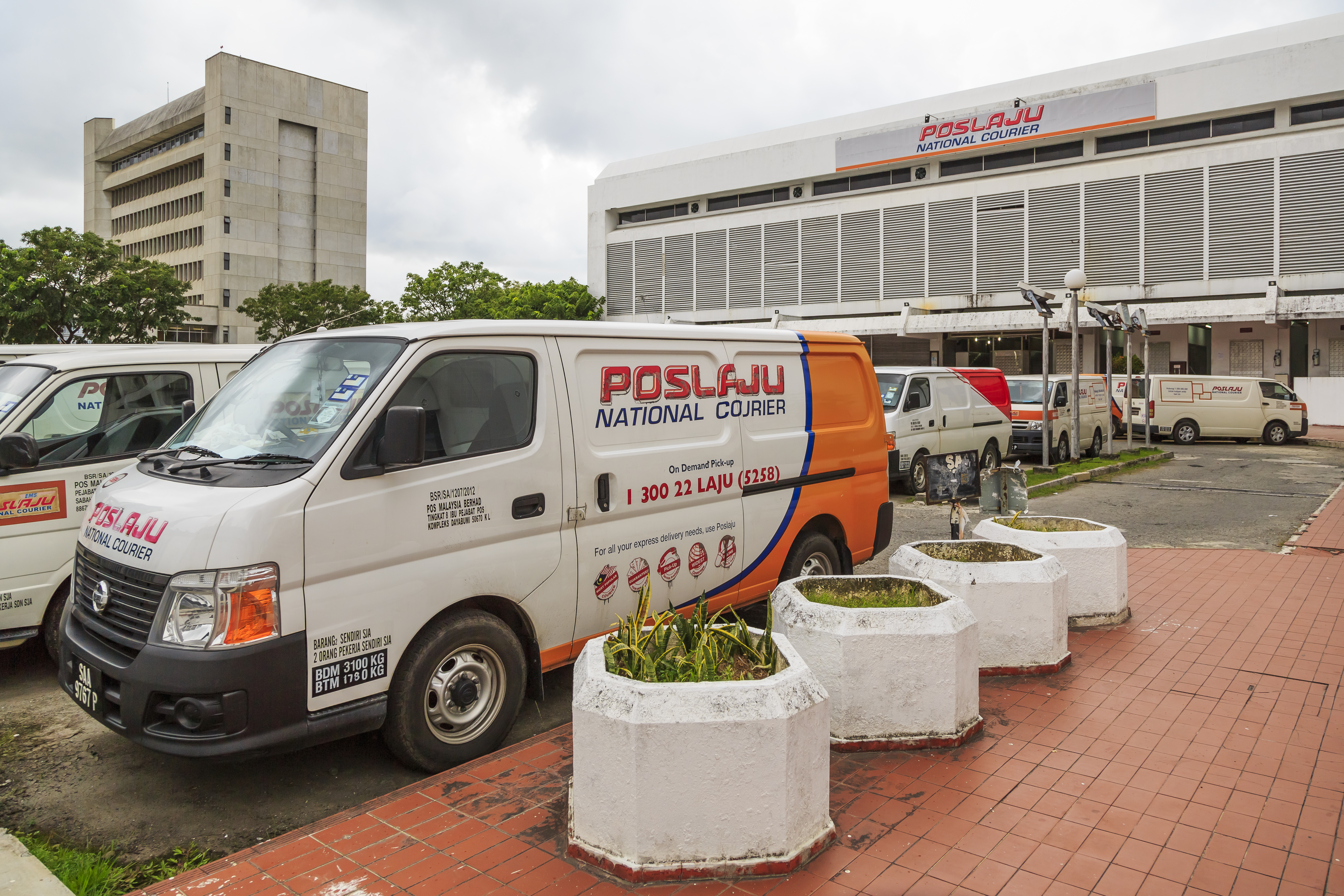
Pos Laju office in Kota Kinabalu GPO.

==== Pos Laju ====
In 1986, Pos Malaysia began introducing Expedited Mail Service (EMS) to international destinations. By 1988, the national postal service introduced Pos Laju as their domestic Courier, Express and Parcel Services arm. Pos Laju maintains the widest courier network in the country, supported by more than 600 post offices nationwide. Pos Laju utilises Integrated Parcel Centres such as in the National Mail Centre, Shah Alam and Pos Malaysia International Hub, KLIA. Attempts were made to unbundle Pos Laju's international services through the launching of Redly Express. However it was short-lived when international services were remerged under one brand, Pos Laju.

Pos Laju offers next-day delivery, express and economy sea shipping through Pos Laju Standard, International Express, International Economy Air Parcel, and Domestic Sea Parcel Service for East Malaysia.

=== Logistics ===
Pos Logistics is the logistics arm of Pos Malaysia.

In 1984, Konsortium Perkapalan Berhad was incorporated as a haulage company. By 19 January 1996, Konsortium Perkapalan Berhad was listed in the Kuala Lumpur Stock Exchange and rebranded to Konsortium Logistik Berhad. On 25 October 2013, KL Airport Services Sdn. Bhd. (KLAS), a DRB-HICOM subsidiary, acquired Konsortium Logistik from Ekuiti Nasional and Tabung Haji for RM240.97 million. After the acquisition of KLAS by Pos Malaysia, Konsortium Logistik rebranded to Pos Logistics.

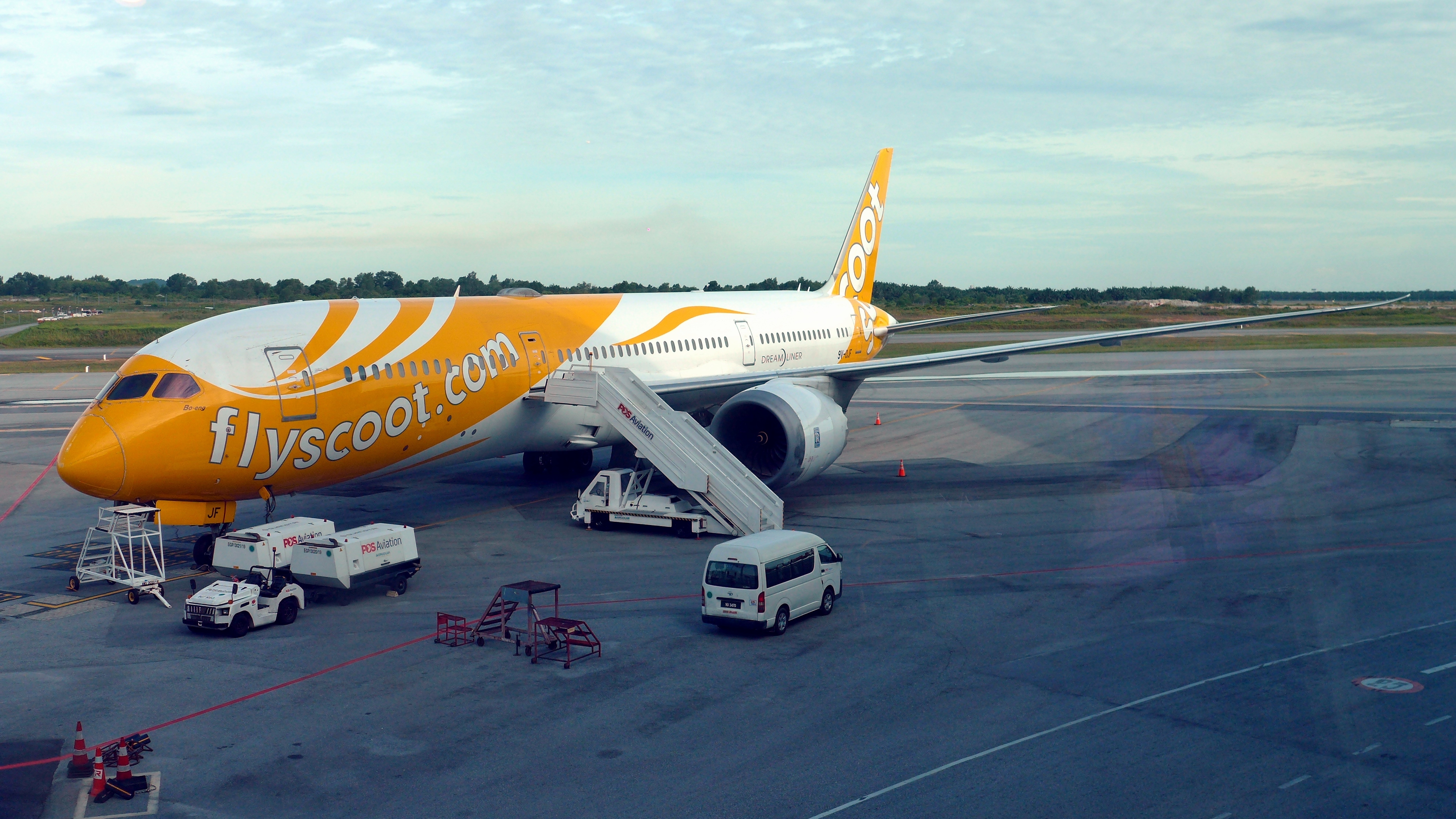
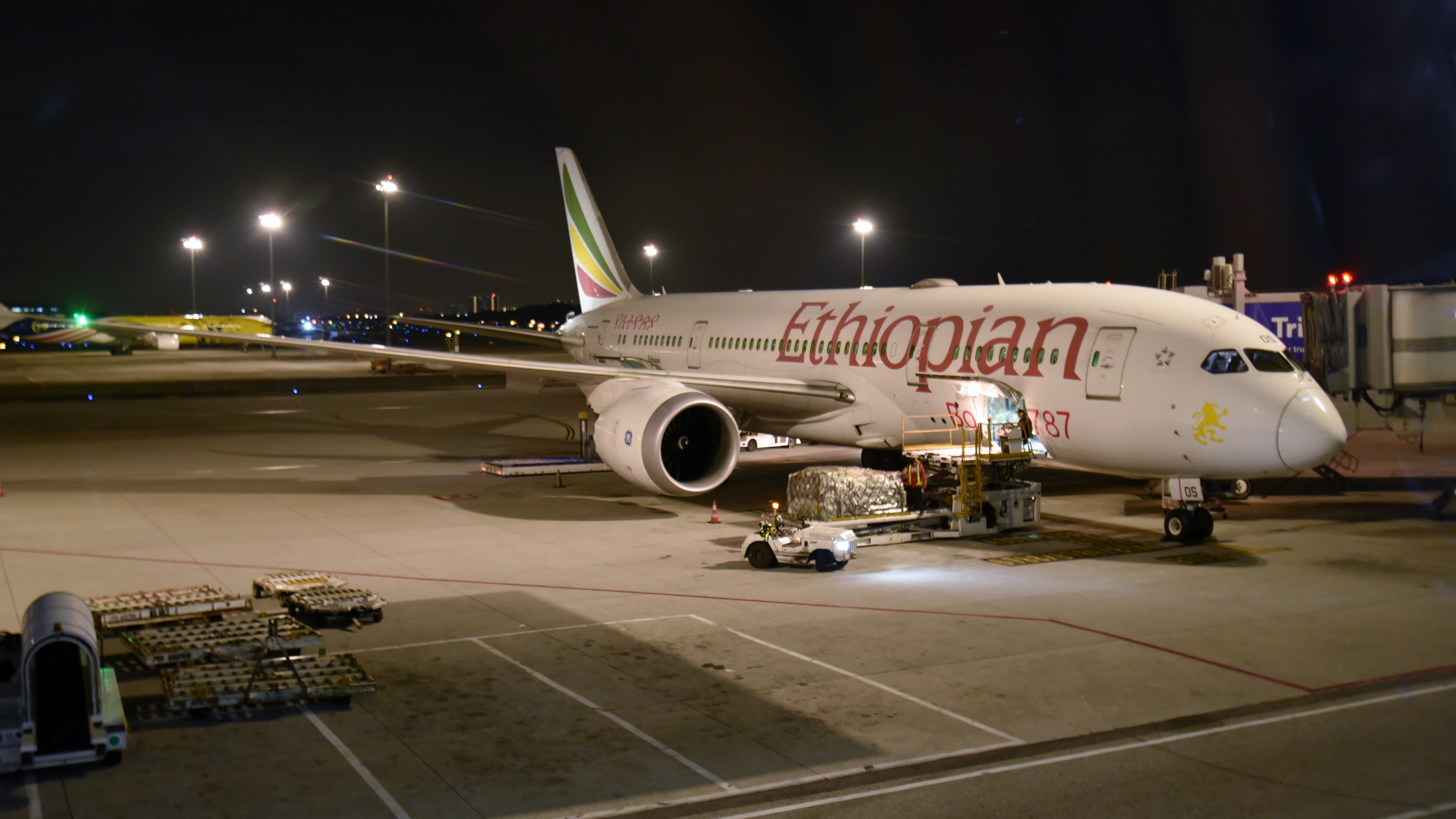
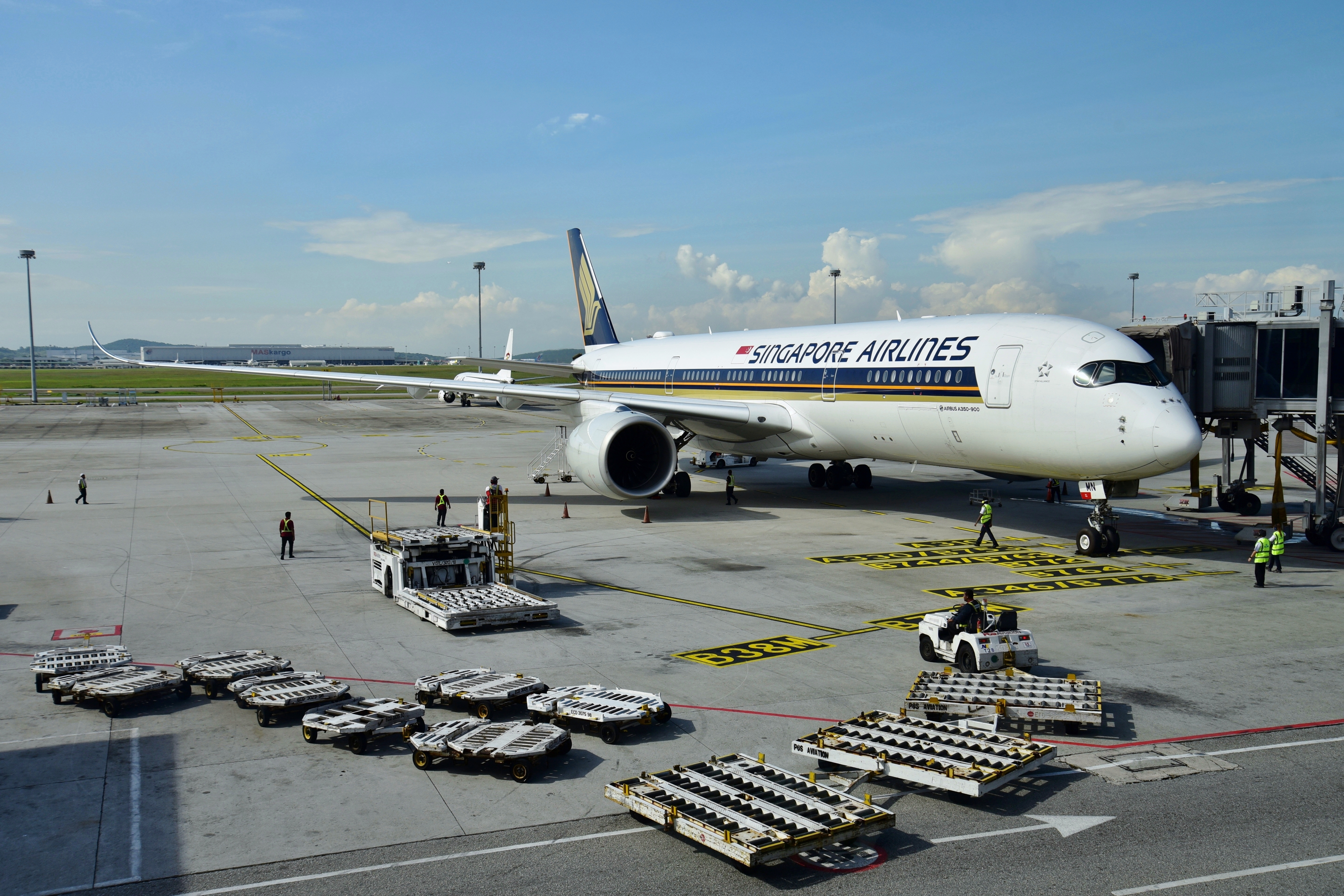
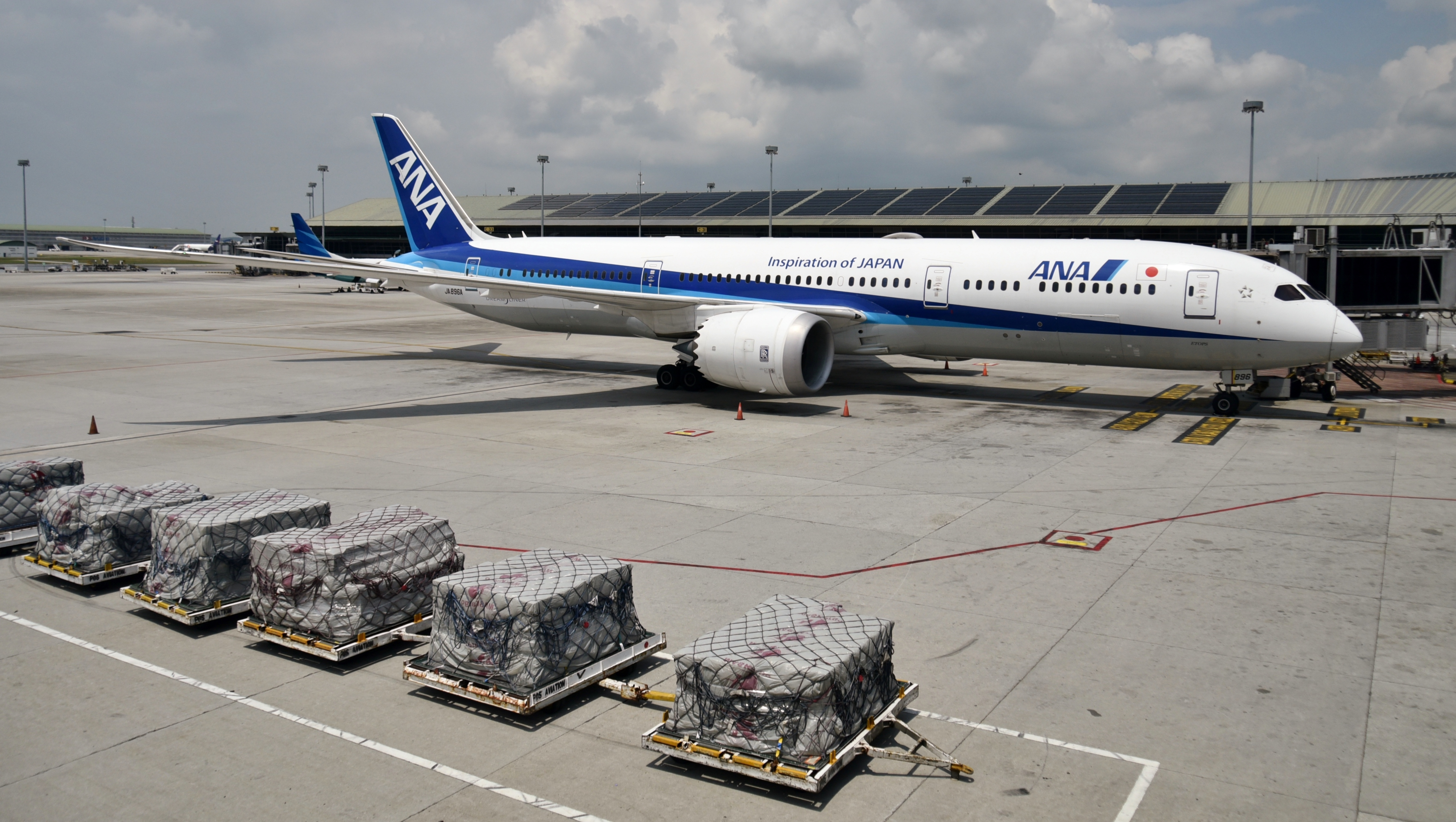
Pos Aviation ground handlers in KLIA.

=== Aviation ===
Pos Malaysia is involved in ground handling, cargo handling, in-flight catering and aviation engineering through its subsidiary, Pos Aviation Sdn. Bhd. SIA Engineering Company is an associate of Pos Aviation's engineering arm, Pos Aviation Engineering Services.

Pos Aviation was initially known as KL Airport Services Sdn. Bhd. before it was acquired by Pos Malaysia. Aviation is one of the two only profitable segments in Pos Malaysia's portfolio.

==== World Cargo Airlines ====
World Cargo Airlines is a cargo airline based in Kuala Lumpur International Airport. The airline is a venture between Pos Aviation and Asia Cargo Network.

=== Information Technology ===
Pos Digicert, a wholly-owned subsidiary of Pos Malaysia, is a certificate authority based in Cyberjaya.

== See also ==
- Postage stamps and postal history of Malaysia
- List of Malaysian stamps
- Revenue stamps of Malaysia
- List of national postal services
