= UNITAR International University =

Malaysian university

UNITAR Education Group
- Chief Executive Officer: Puvan Balachandran
- Mission: Create highly employable and entrepreneurial global citizens
- Vision: Accelerate innovative solutions in a global learning ecosystem for a sustainable future
- Type: Private
- Established: 1991
- Vice-Chancellor: Professor Emeritus Tan Sri Dato’ Sri Ir. Dr. Sahol Hamid bin Abu Bakar
- Chancellor: Dato’ Mohamed Nizam Bin Tun Abdul Razak
- Location: Kelana Jaya, Selangor, Malaysia; 3.0999°N 101.6001°E
- Campus: Tierra Crest, Jalan SS6/3, Kelana Jaya
- Nickname: UNITAR
- Website: www.unitar.my

UNITAR International University (UNITAR) is a private university in Selangor, Malaysia. The university was established in 1991 and its main campus, which has a total built-up area of 280,000 sq ft spanning 15-storeys, is currently located at Kelana Jaya, Selangor.

UNITAR is one of the first virtual university in Southeast Asia and among the earliest private universities that was established in Malaysia.

== Ownership ==
Founded in 1991 as University of Management and Technology (UMTECH), it was later rebranded as UNITAR International University and is currently owned and managed by Ekuiti Nasional Berhad (EKUINAS), a private equity company owned by the Government of Malaysia.

== Faculties & centre ==
UNITAR currently offers undergraduate and postgraduate programs in various fields such as Business, Law, Education, Information Technology and others on both physical and Online Distance Learning (ODL) format.

- School of Media, Art and Design
- School of Business and Entrepreneurship
- School of Education
- School of Information Technology
- School of Psychology

== Centre ==
=== Main campus ===
UNITAR International University Main Campus Petaling Jaya

=== Regional centre (university) ===
1. UNITAR International University Regional Centre Alor Setar
2. UNITAR International University Regional Centre Kota Bharu
3. UNITAR International University Regional Centre Johor Bahru
4. UNITAR International University Regional Centre Ipoh
5. UNITAR International University Regional Centre Kota Kinabalu
6. UNITAR International University Regional Centre Kuala Terengganu
7. UNITAR International University Regional Centre Kuching
8. UNITAR International University Regional Centre Melaka

=== Regional Centre (university college) ===
UNITAR University College Kuala Lumpur (UUCKL) (Formerly known as Kuala Lumpur Metropolitan University College)

=== Regional centre (college) ===
Formerly known as Cosmopoint college

1. UNITAR College Ipoh
2. UNITAR College Johor Bahru
3. UNITAR College Kota Bharu
4. UNITAR College Kota Kinabalu
5. UNITAR College Kuala Terengganu
6. UNITAR College Penang
7. UNITAR College Sungai Petani
8. UNITAR College Melaka
9. UNITAR College Kuching
