= List of Malaysian stamps =

Formerly called the Federation of Malaya until 1963, Malaysia started to issue stamps under the current name starting in 1963.

== Malaya ==
1893 Malaya 2 cents.

== 1930s ==
=== 1935 ===
- 5 December: Perak Definitive

=== 1945 ===
- 19 October: British Military Administration

=== 1948 ===
- 1 September: Singapore Definitive

=== 1949 ===
- 21 February: Penang Definitive
- 1 March: Malacca Definitive
- 12 September: Selangor Definitive
- 10 October: 75th Anniversary of Universal Postal Union

== 1950s ==
=== 1950 ===
- 1 June: Kedah Definitive
- 17 August: Perak Definitive

=== 1951 ===
- 11 July: Kelantan Definitive

=== 1952 ===
- 1 September: Perlis Definitive
- 1 September: Kedah Definitive
- 1 September: Selangor Definitive

=== 1953 ===
- 2 June: Coronation of H. M. Queen Elizabeth II

=== 1954 ===
- 1 September: Penang Definitive
- 1 December: Penang Definitive

=== 1955 ===
- 4 September: Queen Elizabeth II Singapore Definitive Series
- 4 September: Perlis Definitive
- 4 September: Kedah Definitive
- 4 September: Penang Definitive
- 4 September: Perak Definitive
- 4 September: Negeri Sembilan Definitive
- 21 November: Diamond Jubilee of HH Sir Ibrahim Sultan of Johore

=== 1957 ===
- 5 May: Federation of Malaya
- 26 June: Perak Definitive
- 25 July: Perak Definitive
- 4 August: Pahang Definitive
- 21 August: Perak Definitive

== 1940s ==
=== 1942 ===
- 16 February: Fall of Singapore
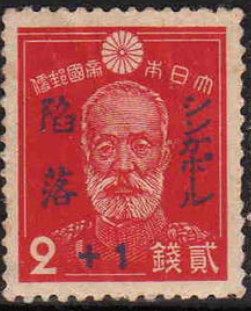
  1942 Fall of Singapore
- 1–2 November: Selangor Agri-Horticultural Exhibition
- 8–14 December: First Anniversary of the Greater East Asia War and First Day of Japanese Definitive Stamps Usage

=== 1943 ===
- 11–15 February: First Anniversary of the Fall of Singapore
- 29 April: Marai/Malai Definitive
- 1 June: Marai/Malai Definitive
- 1 September: Commemorating the 1,000,000 dollars in the Marai / Malai Postal Savings Fund
- 1 October: Marai/Malai Definitive

=== 1944 ===
- 2 February: 2nd Anniversary of the Rebirth of Marai / Malai

== 1930s ==
=== 1939 ===
- 1 January: North Borneo Definitive

== 1940s ==
=== 1945 ===
- 17 December: BMA Overprint Definitive

=== 1947 ===
- 1 September: Cypher Overprint Definitive
- 15 December: Cypher Overprint Definitive
- 22 December: Cypher Overprint Definitive

=== 1948 ===
- 1 November: Royal Silver Wedding

=== 1949 ===
- 10 October: 75th Anniversary of Universal Postal Union

== 1950s ==
=== 1950 ===
- 1 July: King George VI Definitive

=== 1952 ===
- 1 May: King George VI Definitive

=== 1953 ===
- 3 June: Coronation of H. M. Queen Elizabeth II

=== 1954 ===
- 1 March: Queen Elizabeth II Definitive
- 1 July: Queen Elizabeth II Definitive
- 3 August: Queen Elizabeth II Definitive
- 1 October: Queen Elizabeth II Definitive

=== 1955 ===
- 1 April: Queen Elizabeth II Definitive
- 16 May: Queen Elizabeth II Definitive
- 1 October: Queen Elizabeth II Definitive

=== 1956 ===
- 10 February: Queen Elizabeth II Definitive
- 1 June: Queen Elizabeth II Definitive
- 1 November: 75th Anniversary of the Royal Charter of North Borneo

=== 1957 ===
- 1 February: Queen Elizabeth II Definitive

== 1960s ==
=== 1961 ===
- 1 February: Queen Elizabeth II Definitive

=== 1963 ===
- 4 June: Freedom from Hunger

== 1940s ==
=== 1945 ===
- 6 November: Australian Stamps for Use in Sarawak
- 17 December: BMA Overprint Definitive

=== 1946 ===
- 18 May: Sarawak Centenary

=== 1947 ===
- 16 April: Sir Charles Vyner Brooke (cypher overprint) Definitive

=== 1949 ===
- 10 October: 75th Anniversary of Universal Postal Union

== 1950s ==
=== 1950 ===
- 3 January: H. M. King George VI Definitive

=== 1952 ===
- 1 February: H. M. King George VI Definitive

=== 1953 ===
- 3 June: Coronation of H. M. Queen Elizabeth II

=== 1955 ===
- 1 June: Queen Elizabeth II Definitive

=== 1957 ===
- 1 October: Queen Elizabeth II Definitive

== 1930s ==
=== 1937 ===
- 12 May: Coronation H. M. King George VI

=== 1938 ===
- 1 January: Straits Settlements Definitive
- 10 January: Straits Settlements Definitive

== 1950s ==
=== 1957 ===
- 31 August: Hari Merdeka (Independence Day)

=== 1958 ===
- 5 March: 14th U.N Economic Commission for Asia and the Far East Conference, Kuala Lumpur
- 31 August: 1st Anniversary of Independence
- 10 December: 10th Anniversary of Human Rights Day

=== 1959 ===
- 20 February: Installation of H.H. the Sultan of Kedah Sultan Abdul Halim
- 1 July: Kedah Definitive
- 12 September: Inauguration of Parliament

== 1960s ==
=== 1960 ===
- 10 February: Coronation of the Sultan of Johore Sultan Ismail
- 15 March: Penang Definitive
- 7 April: World Refugee Year
- 10 June: Johore Definitive
- 19 September: 15th Meeting of the International Rubber Study Group
- 7 October: Johore Definitive

=== 1961 ===
- 4 January: Installation of the Yang di-Pertuan Agong Tuanku Syed Putra
- 17 April: Installation of the Yang di-Pertuan Besar of Negeri Sembilan Tuanku Munawir
- 28 June: Coronation of the Sultan of Selangor Sultan Salahuddin
- 17 July: Coronation of the Sultan of Kelantan Sultan Yahya Petra
- 30 October: 13th Colombo Plan Consultative Committee Meeting, Kuala Lumpur

=== 1962 ===
- 1 March: Selangor Definitive
- 1 March: Kelantan Definitive
- 7 April: World Malaria Eradication Campaign
- 21 July: National Language Month
- 1 October: Free Primary Education

=== 1963 ===
- 21 March: Freedom from Hunger
- 26 June: Cameron Highlands Hydroelectric Scheme

== 1960s ==
=== 1963 ===
- 16 September: Formation of Malaysia
- 3 October: 4th World Orchid Conference, Singapore
- 26 October: Installation of the Sultan of Perak Sultan Idris Shah II
- 4 November: 9th Commonwealth Parliamentary Conference, Kuala Lumpur

=== 1964 ===
- 1 July: Sabah Definitive
- 10 October: Eleanor Roosevelt Commemoration

=== 1965 ===
- 17 May: 100th Anniversary of International Telecommunication Union
- 27 August: Opening of National Mosque, Kuala Lumpur
- 30 August: Opening of International Airport, Kuala Lumpur
- 9 September: National Birds Series
- 15 November: State Definitive Series
- 14 December: 3rd Southeast Asian Peninsular Games

=== 1966 ===
- 8 February: National Monument, Kuala Lumpur
- 11 April: Installation of the Yang di-Pertuan Agong Tuanku Ismail Nasiruddin Shah
- 21 October: 150th Anniversary of Penang Free School
- 1 December: First Malaysia Plan

=== 1967 ===
- 30 March: Completion of Malaysia-Hong Kong Link of SEACOM Telephone Cable
- 31 August: 10th Anniversary of Independence
- 8 September: 100th Anniversary of the Sarawak Council
- 2 December: 100th Anniversary of Straits Settlements Stamps

=== 1968 ===
- 8 April: Installation of the Yang di-Pertuan Besar of Negeri Sembilan Tuanku Jaafar
- 29 August: National Rubber Conference, Kuala Lumpur
- 12 October: Olympic Games, Mexico

=== 1969 ===
- 8 February: Solidarity Week
- 8 December: National Rice Year

== 1970s ==
=== 1970 ===
- 6 April: Satellite Earth Station in Kuantan, Pahang
- 31 August: National Butterflies Series
- 7 September: 50th Anniversary of International Labour Organization
- 24 October: 25th Anniversary of United Nations
- 16 December: 25th Anniversary of Installation of the Sultan of Trengganu Tuanku Ismail Nasiruddin Shah

=== 1971 ===
- 20 February: Installation of the Yang di-Pertuan Agong, Tuanku Abdul Halim Shah
- 28 March: 25th Anniversary of Installation of the Raja of Perlis Tuanku Syed Putra
- 15 May: Opening of the Bank Negara Malaysia Building, Kuala Lumpur
- 13 September: 17th Commonwealth Parliamentary Conference, Kuala Lumpur
- 18 September: Visit Association of Southeast Asian Nations Year
- 2 October: 25th Anniversary of UNICEF
- 11 December: 6th Southeast Asian Peninsular Games, Kuala Lumpur

=== 1972 ===
- 31 January: Pacific Area Tourist Association Conference
- 1 February: City Status for Kuala Lumpur

=== 1973 ===
- 2 July: Setting up of the Social Security Organization
- 1 August: 25th Anniversary of the World Health Organization
- 31 August: 10th Anniversary of Malaysia
- 15 September: 50th Anniversary of the International Criminal Police Organization
- 1 October: Setting up of the Malaysia Airline System

=== 1974 ===
- 1 February: Establishment of Kuala Lumpur as a Federal Territory
- 25 April: 7th Annual Meeting of the Board of Governors of the Asian Development Bank
- 1 August: Malaysia Scout Jamboree
- 1 September: 25th Anniversary of the National Electricity Board
- 9 October: Centenary of the Universal Postal Union
- 31 October: 4th World Conference on Tin in Kuala Lumpur

=== 1975 ===
- 1 March: 3rd World Hockey Championship
- 1 May: 25th Anniversary of Malaysian Trade Union Congress
- 8 May: Installation of the Sultan of Pahang Sultan Ahmad Shah
- 25 August: International Women's Year
- 22 September: Koran Reading Competition
- 22 October: 50th Anniversary of Rubber Research Institute of Malaysia

=== 1976 ===
- 19 January: Mint Stamp Butterfly Coil
- 6 February: 75th Anniversary of the Institute of Medical Research
- 28 February: Installation of the Yang di-Pertuan Agong, Sultan Yahya Petra
- 17 August: Official Opening of the State Assembly Complex and Administrative Building, Sarawak
- 18 October: 25th Anniversary of Employees Provident Fund, Malaysia
- 20 November: 25th Anniversary of the Malaysian Association for the Blind

=== 1977 ===
- 14 January: In Memory of the late Tun Haji Abdul Razak (3rd Malaysian Plan)
- 7 July: 25th Anniversary of the Federal Land Development Authority (FELDA)
- 8 August: 10th Anniversary of Association of Southeast Asian Nations
- 19 November: 9th Southeast Asian Games

=== 1978 ===
- 15 March: 2nd Board of Governors Meeting of the Islamic Development Bank
- 10 July: 4th Commonwealth Conference of Postal Administration
- 26 July: 4th Malaysian Scout Jamboree
- 30 September: Global Eradication of Small Pox
- 28 November: 100 Years of Natural Rubber
- 7 December: Opening of the New Town of Shah Alam as the State Capital of Selangor

=== 1979 ===
- 4 January: National Animals Series
- 26 January: 20th Anniversary of the Central Bank of Malaysia
- 24 February: International Year of the Child
- 19 September: Opening of Temengor Hydro-Electric Power Station
- 20 September: World Telecommunications Exhibition, Geneva

== 1980s ==
=== 1980 ===
- 30 March: Coronation of the Sultan of Kelantan Tuanku Ismail Petra
- 10 July: Installation of the Yang di-Pertuan Agong Sultan Ahmad Shah
- 31 August: Submarine Cable Project between Kuantan and Kuching
- 2 September: 10th Anniversary of the National University of Malaysia
- 9 November: 15th Century of Hijrah

=== 1981 ===
- 14 February: International Year of Disabled Persons
- 21 March: Installation of the Sultan of Trengganu Sultan Mahmud
- 2 May: Industrial Training and Exposition Seminar
- 17 June: Silver Jubilee of the Malaysian National Committee of the World Energy Conference
- 31 August: 100th Anniversary of Sabah Celebration
- 16 December: Trees of Malaysia

=== 1982 ===
- 10 April: 5th Malaysian Jamboree / 7th Asia Pacific Jamboree in Kelantan
- 8 August: 15th Anniversary of Association of Southeast Asian Nations
- 21 August: The Freedom of Palestine
- 31 August: 25th Anniversary of Independence
- 30 October: Traditional Games
- 26 November: Malaysian Handicraft

=== 1983 ===
- 22 January: Launch of Malaysia LNG Export from Bintulu
- 14 March: Commonwealth Day
- 15 June: Fresh Water Fish
- 1 July: Opening of the East–West Highway
- 15 July: Silver Jubilee of the Reign of Sultan of Kedah Sultan Abdul Halim
- 16 September: Golden Jubilee of the Malaysian Armed Forces
- 26 October: Hornbills of Malaysia

=== 1984 ===
- 26 January: 25th Anniversary of Bank Negara Malaysia
- 1 February: 10th Anniversary of the formation of Federal Territory
- 16 April: Formation of the Federal Territory of Labuan
- 30 May: Traditional Malay Weapons
- 23 June: 20th Anniversary of Asia-Pacific Broadcasting Union
- 29 October: Official Opening of the Kuala Lumpur General Post Office
- 15 November: Installation of the Yang di-Pertuan Agong Sultan Iskandar
- 12 December: Hibiscus of Malaysia

=== 1985 ===
- 30 March: 25th Anniversary of Parliament
- 25 April: Protected Animal of Malaysia
- 15 May: International Youth Year
- 1 June: 100 years of Malayan Railway
- 9 July: Proton Saga, Malaysian National Car
- 5 September: Silver Jubilee of the Reign of the Sultan of Selangor Sultan Salahuddin Abdul Aziz Shah
- 14 September: Opening of Penang Bridge
- 4 November: Petroleum Production in Malaysia
- 9 December: Installation of the Sultan of Perak Sultan Azlan Shah

=== 1986 ===
- 11 March: Protected Wildlife of Malaysia (2nd Series)
- 14 April: Pacific Asia Travel Association Conference
- 19 April: Malaysia Games
- 26 June: 10th Anniversary of National Association for the Prevention of Drug, Malaysia (PEMADAM)
- 31 July: MAS Inaugural Flight to Los Angeles
- 15 September: Postage Due
- 3 November: 25th Anniversary of the Asian Productivity Organization
- 20 December: Historical Buildings

=== 1987 ===
- 7 March: Musical Instruments of Malaysia
- 6 April: International Year of Shelter for the Homeless
- 8 June: International Conference on Drug Abuse and Illicit Trafficking
- 13 July: Official Opening of the Sultan Mahmud Power Plant, Kenyir Lake, Hulu Terengganu, Terengganu
- 1 September: 33rd Commonwealth Parliamentary Conference
- 26 October: Decade of Transportation and Communication for Asia and Pacific
- 14 November: Protected Wildlife (3rd Series) - Endangered Cats
- 14 December: 20th Anniversary of Association of Southeast Asian Nations

=== 1988 ===
- 11 March: Official Opening of the Sultan Salahuddin Abdul Aziz Shah Mosque
- 4 April: Official Opening of the Sultan Ismail Power Plant, Paka, Dungun, Terengganu
- 30 June: The Protected Passerine Birds
- 31 August: 25th Anniversary of Independence of Sabah and Sarawak in Malaysia
- 17 December: Marine Life (1st Series)

=== 1989 ===
- 15 April: Declaration of Malacca as a Historic City
- 29 June: Marine Life (2nd series)
- 28 July: 7th Malaysian National Jamboree
- 20 August: 15th Southeast Asian Games, Kuala Lumpur
- 18 September: Installation of the Yang di-Pertuan Agong Sultan Azlan Shah
- 18 October: Commonwealth Heads of Government Meeting 1989 (CHOGM)
- 2 December: Inaugural Malaysia Airlines 747-400 Non-Stop Flight to London
- 28 December: National Park Golden Jubilee Celebration

== 1990s ==
=== 1990 ===
- 1 January: Visit Malaysia Year
- 12 March: Wildflowers of Malaysia
- 14 May: Kuala Lumpur, Garden City of Lights
- 1 June: First Meeting of the Summit Level Group for South-South Consultation and Co-operation, Kuala Lumpur
- 2 June: 250th Anniversary of Alor Setar
- 8 September: International Literacy Year
- 17 November: Marine Life (3rd Series) - Turtles
- 28 December: National Park

=== 1991 ===
- 25 April: 25th Anniversary of Majlis Amanah Rakyat
- 29 July: Insects (First Series)
- 30 August: Past Prime Minister of Malaysia
- 7 November: Historical Buildings Series II
- 21 December: 100 Years Sarawak Museum

=== 1992 ===
- 1 January: Launch of Pos Malaysia Berhad
- 23 March: Malaysia Tropical Forest
- 18 April: Silver Jubilee of the Reign of The Yang di-Pertuan Besar of Negeri Sembilan Tuanku Ja'afar
- 25 July: Thomas Cup Champion - Badminton Championship Challenge Trophy
- 8 August: 25th Anniversary of Association of Southeast Asian Nations
- 1 September: 125th Anniversary of the First Stamp in Malaysia
- 21 December: Malaysian Corals

=== 1993 ===
- 24 April: 16th Asia-Pacific Dental Congress
- 24 June: Centenary of Royal Selangor Golf Club
- 2 August: Malaysian Wildflowers (2nd Series)
- 13 September: 14th Commonwealth Forestry Conference
- 23 October: Birds (Kingfishers of Malaysia)
- 7 December: Langkawi International Maritime and Aerospace Exhibition

=== 1994 ===
- 1 January: Visit Malaysia Year
- 7 February: National Planetarium
- 17 February: Orchids of Malaysia
- 17 June: World Islamic Civilization Festival
- 26 July: A centenary of Veterinary Services and Animal Industry in Malaysia
- 3 September: 100 Years Before and After - An Electrifying Pace
- 8 September: The North-South Expressway
- 22 September: Installation of His Majesty the 10th Yang di-Pertuan Agong Tuanku Ja'afar
- 29 October: Pre-Issue - XVI Commonwealth Games
- 10 November: The Tunku Abdul Rahman Memorial
- 16 December: Official Opening of the National Library Building

=== 1995 ===
- 18 January: Fungi of Malaysia
- 18 April: Clouded leopard of Malaysia / World Wide Fund for Nature
- 29 May: 100 Year of X-ray
- 1 September: Traditional Malay Weapons Series II
- 11 September: Pre-Issue 95 - XVI Commonwealth Games (2nd Issue)
- 24 October: 50th Anniversary of the United Nations
- 30 October: 50 Year of IATA (International Air Transport Association)
- 4 December: Golden Jubilee of the Reign of the Raja of Perlis Tuanku Syed Putra
- 23 December: 10th Anniversary of PROTON

=== 1996 ===
- 13 January: Launch of MEASAT 1 (Malaysia East-Asia Satellite)
- 6 April: Pitcher Plants of Malaysia
- 18 May: Birds of Prey
- 26 June: International Day against Drug Abuse and Illicit Trafficking
- 27 September: Butterflies of Malaysia
- 1 October: Kuala Lumpur Tower
- 7 October: The 14th Conference of the Confederation of Asian and Pacific Accountants
- 29 November: National Science Centre
- 2 December: Stamp Week 1996 Wildlife
- 21 December: Pre-Issue 96 - XVI Commonwealth Games (3rd issue)

=== 1997 ===
- 4 January: Highland Birds of Malaysia
- 1 March: Light Rail Transit System
- 24 March: 1997 ICC Trophy
- 2 April: 50 Years of Aviation in Malaysia
- 16 June: 9th World Youth Football Championship
- 31 July: Centenary of the Conference of Rulers
- 8 August: 30th Anniversary of Association of Southeast Asian Nations
- 23 August: International Year of the Reef
- 25 August: 20th PPSEAWA International Conference
- 9 September: 50 Years of Organised Philately
- 3 November: The 7th Summit Level of the Group of 15
- 15 November: Pre-Issue 97 - XVI Commonwealth Games (4th Issue)
- 1 December: Stamp Week 1997 / Protected Wildlife

=== 1998 ===
- 10 January: Rare Fruits of Malaysia
- 23 February: Venues of the Kuala Lumpur 98 - XVI Commonwealth Games
- 11 April: Currency Heritage
- 8 Mei: Malaysian Red Crescent Society
- 27 June: Kuala Lumpur International Airport
- 18 July: Medicinal Plant of Malaysia
- 11 September: Kuala Lumpur 98 - XVI Commonwealth Games
- 31 October: Modernisation of Rail Transport
- 14 November: APEC (Asia-Pacific Economic Cooperation) Conference
- 28 November: Stamp Week 1998 / Insects of Malaysia
- 12 December: Glorious Moments from the Kuala Lumpur 98 Games

=== 1999 ===
- 28 January: International Year of Older Persons
- 27 February: Rare Fruits of Malaysia (Series II)
- 4 March: Installation of the Sultan of Terengganu Sultan Mizan Zainal Abidin
- 1 April: Cats in Malaysia
- 28 May: Protected Mammals in Malaysia
- 19 June: 5th International Congress on AIDS in Asia and the Pacific
- 19 June: Freshwater Fishes of Malaysia
- 24 July: P. Ramlee, Artist Supreme
- 30 August: Petronas Twin Towers
- 1 September: Taiping, Perak (1874–1999)
- 9 September: 50th Anniversary of TNB - Powering the Nation's Progress
- 15 September: National Theatre
- 23 September: Installation of His Majesty the XI Yang di-Pertuan Agong Sultan Salahuddin Abdul Aziz Shah
- 3 October: 21st World Road Congress
- 17 October: Malaysia Grand Prix 1999 Sepang
- 23 October: The Silver Jubilee of His Royal Highness's Installation as The Sultan of Pahang (1974–1999) Sultan Haji Ahmad Shah
- 18 November: World Golf Cup Malaysia '99
- 29 November: Stamp Week 1999 / Heliconia and its Botanical relatives
- 18 December: 125 Years of Universal Postal Union
- 31 December: Celebrate the New Millennium (Series l)

== 2000s ==
=== 2000 ===
- 1 January: Celebrate the Millennium (Series II)
- 6 January: Celebrate the year of the Dragon
- 19 February: World Team Table Tennis Championships
- 20 February: Celebrate the Millennium (Series III)
- 20 February: Spirit of the New Malaysian
- 7 March: The 2nd Global Knowledge Conference
- 6 April: Islamic Arts Museum Malaysia
- 15 April: Traditional Boats of Malaysia
- 20 April: Unit Trust Week
- 11 May: Thomas /Uber Cup, K.L. 2000
- 24 June: Children's Traditional Games (Series I)
- 26 June: 27th Session of the Islamic Conference of the Foreign Ministers (ICFM)
- 5 July: Census for Planning in the New Millennium
- 22 July: Birds of Malaysia
- 23 July: National Animal Welfare Week 2000
- 7 August: XXI IUFRO World Congress
- 24 August: 100 Year of Institute for Medical research
- 26 August: Protected Mammals (2nd Series)
- 14 September: 50th Anniversary of Majlis Amanah Rakyat
- 16 September: Children's Traditional Games (Series II)
- 24 September: World Heart Day
- 9 October: Stamp Week 2000 / Highland Flowers of Malaysia (2nd Series)
- 25 November: Dragonflies and Damselflies

=== 2001 ===
- 22 January: Quails & Partridges
- 1 February: Formation of Putrajaya Federal Territory
- 17 February: Sabah & Sarawak Beads
- 27 March: Scented Flowers of Malaysia
- 7 May: Installation of His Royal Highness Raja of Perlis Tuanku Syed Sirajuddin
- 11 June: Cultural Instrument & Artefact
- 9 July: Malaysian Made Vehicles (Series II)
- 1 August: Malaysian Bantams
- 8 September: XXI SEA Games
- 27 September: FDI World Dental Congress
- 1 October: 50th Anniversary of Employees Provident Fund
- 18 October: 100th Anniversary of Forestry Department
- 10 November: Stamp Week 2001 / Marine Life (Series V)

=== 2002 ===
- 2 January: 2002 Men's Hockey World Cup
- 5 February: Rare Flowers Joint Issue Stamp Malaysia-China
- 9 March: Species of Snakes in Malaysia
- 13 April: Express Rail Link
- 24 April: 17th World Orchid Conference
- 25 April: Installation of His Majesty the 12th Yang di-Pertuan Agong Tuanku Syed Sirajuddin
- 25 April: Special Edition - Their Majesties Yang di-Pertuan Agong of Malaysia (Series I)
- 17 May: Aquatic plants of Malaysia
- 27 June: Tropical Birds Malaysia-Singapore Joint Issue
- 31 July: Islands and Beaches of Malaysia
- 24 August: Malaysian Unity
- 17 September: Famous Scholar - Zainal Abidin bin Ahmad
- 2 November: Malaysia's Fashion Heritage
- 29 November: Celebration 80 Years of SITC-MPSI-IPSI-UPSI
- 17 December: Stamp Week 2002 - The Tame and The Wild

=== 2003 ===
- 25 January: Protected Wildlife - Southern Serow
- 6 February: XIII Conference of Heads of State or Government of the Non-Aligned Movement
- 22 February: Roses in Malaysia
- 3 March: Father of Independence (100 Years Birth of the Late Tunku Abdul Rahman Putra Al-Haj)
- 8 March: Coronation of H.R.H. Sultan Selangor IX Sultan Sharafuddin Idris Shah
- 26 April: Ornamental Fish - Fighting Fish
- 24 May: Historical Places - Clock Towers
- 28 June: Islands and Beaches of Malaysia (Series II) - Pulau Ligitan & Pulau Sipadan
- 19 August: Merdeka Series - 46th Independence Celebration
- 27 September: Malaysian Made Vehicles Series IV - Motorcycles & Scooters
- 3 October: 10th Session of the Islamic Summit Conference
- 11 October: 50th World Children's Day Celebration
- 16 December: Stamp Week 2003 - Primates of Malaysia - Red Leaf & Proboscis Monkey

=== 2004 ===
- 31 January: Historical Buildings - Lighthouse
- 9 February: 7th Conference of Parties to the Convention on Biological Diversity & 1st Meeting of Parties to the Cartagena Protocol on Biosafety
- 29 February: Silver Jubilee of the Reign of H.R.H. the Sultan of Kelantan Sultan Ismail Petra
- 19 March: Commonwealth Tourism Ministers' Meeting 2004
- 22 May: National Service Programme - The Making of Our Future Leaders
- 31 May: 30th Anniversary Malaysia-China Diplomatic Relationship
- 14 June: Wildlife in the Malaysian Forest
- 1 July: Malaysia's Multimedia Super Corridor (MSC)
- 24 July: Major Ports of Malaysia
- 18 August: Traditional Transportation
- 4 October: 100th Years of Matang Mangroves Park, Perak
- 9 October: Stamp Week 2004 - Marine Life (Series VI)
- 11 December: Medicinal Plants - Series II

=== 2005 ===
- 11 January: Rare Flowers Series II
- 24 January: The 5th Ministers' Forum on Infrastructure Development in the Asia-Pacific Region
- 3 February: Migratory Birds of Malaysia
- 7 March: Proton Gen.2, Proton's New Generation
- 9 April: Traditional Dance
- 29 April: Songket, The Regal Heritage
- 14 May: Birds of Malaysia (Definitive Series)
- 9 June: 100 Years of University of Malaya
- 21 July: 600th Anniversary Malaysia - China Relationship
- 27 July: Protected Mammals Series III
- 9 August: Traditional Water Transport
- 30 August: 100th Anniversary of the Malay College Kuala Kangsar
- 28 September: Rare Reptiles of Malaysia
- 10 October: Traditional Kites - Wau
- 2 December: Stamp Week 2005 - Malaysian batik, Crafted For The World
- 12 December: 11th ASEAN Summit
- 22 December: Malaysia's Five Islands & Reefs in the South China Seas

=== 2006 ===
- 26 January: Wild duck species
- 14 February: National Audit Academy 100th Anniversary
- 28 March: Rare Fruits Series III
- 26 April: Mountains of Malaysia
- 25 May: Freshwater fish Series III
- 22 June: 50th Anniversary of the Dewan Bahasa dan Pustaka
- 7 July: Felda 50 Years Celebration
- 18 July: Sultan Azlan Shah Gallery
- 15 August: Malaysian festivals
- 29 August: Traditional costumes
- 9 October: Semi Aquatic Animals (Stamp Week 2006)
- 6 November: XVIII FIGO World Congress of Gynaecology and Obstetrics
- 25 November: 9th FESPIC Games Kuala Lumpur 2006
- 30 November: 15th Anniversary of ASEAN-China Dialogue Relation
- 4 December: 25th General Assembly of the World Veterans Federation
- 28 December: South Pole Expedition

=== 2007 ===
- 6 February: Unique Marine Life / Malaysia-Brunei Joint Issue
- 19 March: Visit Malaysia Year 2007
- 26 April: Installation of His Majesty the 13th Yang di-Pertuan Agong Tuanku Mizan Zainal Abidin
- 3 May: Frogs of Malaysia
- 24 May: Air transportation in Malaysia
- 6 June: Clock towers Series II
- 26 June: Traditional Children's Folk-Tales
- 7 July: Insects Series III
- 24 July: 200 Years Police Force
- 2 August: Royal Heritage of Negeri Sembilan
- 8 August: 40th Anniversary of ASEAN / Asean Joint Issue
- 31 August: Golden Jubilee Celebration of the Independence of Malaysia
- 4 September: Aga Khan Award for Architecture
- 25 September: State Emblems
- 26 November: Rare Vegetables (Stamp Week 2007)
- 13 December: FEI 5 Stars KL Grand Prix 2007
- 31 December: Garden Flowers - State Definitive Series

=== 2008 ===
- 28 February: Bridges of Malaysia
- 13 March: Nocturnal animals
- 24 April: Butterflies Of Malaysia
- 22 May: 100th Anniversary of St. John Ambulance of Malaysia
- 10 June: Cultural Instruments & Artefacts II
- 15 July: Golden Jubilee of the Reign of His Royal Highness Sultan Abdul Halim Mu'adzam Shah Sultan Negeri Kedah Darul Aman
- 1 August: 6th IDBF Club Crew World Championships 2008
- 14 August: Centenary Celebration of the Scouts Association of Malaysia
- 28 August: Treasures of the Nation's Visual Arts
- 16 September: Royal Headgear
- 9 October: Unique Flowers
- 21 October: National Angkasawan Programme
- 11 November: Seashells of Malaysia
- 1 December: LAT Malaysian Cartoons - Stamp Week 2008
- 16 December: Premier Schools

=== 2009 ===
- 21 January: Unique Birds of Malaysia
- 3 February: Silver Jubilee of the Reign of His Royal Highness Paduka Seri Sultan Azlan Muhibbuddin Shah Sultan Perak Darul Ridzuan
- 23 March: Traditional Wedding Costumes
- 9 April: World Heritage Sites
- 20 April: Engineering Excellence in Nation Building
- 19 May: Palm trees
- 31 May: 35th Anniversary of the Establishment of Diplomatic Relations between Malaysia and the People's Republic of China
- 1 June: Conservation of Nature
- 9 July: Traditional Houses
- 23 July: Tuber Plants
- 31 August: 1Malaysia
- 3 September: The First Malaysian Submarine
- 9 September: Energy Efficient Buildings
- 9 October: Caring Society
- 26 October: Installation of His Royal Highness Tuanku Muhriz Negeri Sembilan
- 24 November: State Definitive Series Special Collection - Garden Flowers
- 7 December: Arachnid - Stamp Week 2009

== 2010s ==
=== 2010 ===
- 18 January: Malaysian Currency
- 23 February: The 50th Anniversary of Malaysia-Korea Diplomatic Relations / Malaysia-Korea Joint Issue
- 10 March: Ferns
- 23 March: Local Markets
- 26 April: Medical Excellence
- 10 May: Firefly
- 22 June: 125 Years Malayan Railways
- 1 July: Garden Flowers - New Tariff (National Definitive Series)
- 15 July: Threatened Habitats
- 31 July: Grand Knight Of Valour
- 10 August: Traditional Festive Food
- 27 September: Lifestyles of the Aboriginal people
- 9 October: Old Post offices
- 24 October: Heritage Of Pahang Darul Makmur
- 10 November: 1Malaysia Collection
- 13 December: Traditional Past Time Games With Upin & Ipin and Friends - Stamp Week 2010

=== 2011 ===
- 18 January: Children's Pet
- 21 February: Highland Tourist Spot
- 28 February: AFF Suzuki Cup 2010 Champion
- 28 March: Spices
- 11 April: Artifacts Of National Heritage
- 28 April: SetemKu - Silver Handicraft
- 13 June: Virtues
- 7 July: 100 Years of Aviation
- 18 July: Royal Palaces
- 8 August: Malaysia-Indonesia Joint Issue
- 19 September: Visual art - Series II
- 10 October: Post Box - Stamp Week 2011
- 21 November: Underground Engineering Excellence
- 12 December: Royal Institution

=== 2012 ===
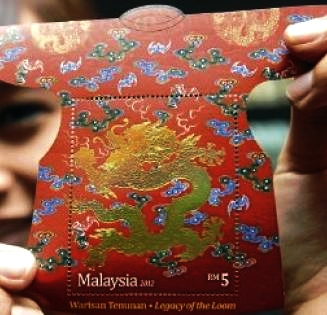
2012 Chinese New Year miniature sheet

- 12 January: Legacy of the Loom
- 27 February: Yes To Life, No To Drugs
- 8 March: Malaysian Antarctic Research Programme
- 21 March: Underwater life
- 11 April: Installation of His Majesty the Yang di-Pertuan Agong XIV
- 24 May: Aromatic Plants
- 4 June: World Gas Conference 2012
- 21 June: Traditional Livelihood
- 21 June: Special Edition Series II - Their Majesties Yang di-Pertuan Agong of Malaysia
- 16 July: Second Series of Malaysian Currency
- 30 August: Malaysian Unity Series II (Malaysia Day)
- 13 September: The Diamond Jubilee of Queen Elizabeth II
- 27 September: Malaysian Festivals Series II
- 7 October: 750 Years Malacca
- 22 October: Postman's Uniform
- 5 November: SetemKu Issue - Salam Malaysia / Malaysia di Hatiku
- 19 November: Children's Hobbies (BoBoiBoy) - Stamp Week 2012
- 20 December: Postal History of Kedah

=== 2013 ===
- 13 January: Woodpecker
- 5 February: Exotic pets
- 26 March: National Unity
- 30 April: Lighthouses in Malaysia Series 2
- 13 May Wonders of Malaysian Forests
- 28 June: Living Corals in Malaysia
- 25 July: Malaysian Salad
- 23 August: Trination (Trination Exhibition 23-25 Aug)
- 31 August: Museums and Artifacts
- 16 September: 50 Years Malaysia Day
- 9 October: Postcard World Postal Day 2013
- 22 October: Celebrating Abilities of Children with Disabilities : Colours of My World
- 28 October: Rare Fruits Series IV
- 13 November: Love Malaysia 50 Years Malaysia - Stamp Week 2013
- 23 November: 100 Years RHB Bank
- 29 November: Baba Nyonya Heritage
- 23 December: Endangered Big Cats of Malaysia

=== 2014 ===
- 27 January: Horse
- 14 February: Rose Series 2
- 13 March: Museum & Artifacts - Unveiling of the Hidden Treasures
- 26 April: President Barack Obama's Visit to Malaysia
- 24 May: Melaka & Jogja – City of Museums
- 31 May: 40 Years Diplomatic Relation between Malaysia-China
- 18 June: Grand Opening World Scout Bureau Kuala Lumpur Office
- 24 June: KLIA2
- 17 July: Malaysian Fruits
- 31 August: 57th Independence Celebration
- 19 October: Local Food / Kuala Lumpur, Malaysia-Hong Kong, China Joint Issue
- 27 October: Malay Folk Stories
- 5 November: World Youth Stamp Exhibition 2014 - KLCC
- 1 December: World Youth Stamp Exhibition 2014 - Stamp Week 2014
- 23 December: The Celebration Of 40 Years Of Reign Of KDYMM Sultan Pahang
- 31 December: The Sultan Abdul Halim Mu'Adzam Shah Bridge, Penang

=== 2015 ===
- 20 January: Medicinal Plants Series III
- 27 January: Malaysia Chairman Asean 2015
- 16 February: Farm Animals
- 25 February: International Cooperative Project On Giant Panda
- 17 March: The 13th Langkawi International Maritime and Aerospace Exhibition
- 23 March: Coronation of KDYMM Sultan Johor
- 13 April: Endangered Marine Life
- 30 April: 175th Year Anniversary of Penny Black
- 6 May: Installation of Paduka Seri Sultan Perak XXXV Sultan Nazrin Muizzuddin Shah
- 17 May: 150th Anniversary of International Telecommunication Union
- 8 June: Malaysia-Thailand Joint Issue (Marine Creatures)
- 25 June: Herons & Bitterns
- 29 July: Pearls
- 8 August: Joint Stamp Issue of ASEAN Community
- 27 August: Mosques in Malaysia
- 8 September: Panda Postal Card
- 15 September: MALAYSIA #sehatisejiwa
- 9 October: World Post Day
- 27 October: Stamp & Philatelic Club - Stamp Week 2015
- 17 November: Islands and Beaches Series III
- 4 December: FourNation Stamp Exhibition
- 28 December: Malaysian Public Transport (Trains in Sabah)

=== 2016 ===
- 26 January: Primates of Malaysia Series 2
- 3 February: Traditional Dances Series 2
- 25 February: Definitive Series - JOHOR
- 7 March: Scented Flowers Series 2
- 21 March: Definitive Series - PERAK
- 29 April: National Laureates
- 26 May: River Transportation in Sarawak
- 28 June: Malaysian Calligraphy
- 27 July: Tourist Destinations - Kedah & Kelantan
- 23 August: Seven Wonders of Malaysia's Flora & Fauna
- 15 September: Battle Sites
- 1 October: International Definitive Stamps - Stamp Week 2016
- 9 October: Posmen Komuniti
- 21 October: Penang Free School - 200 Years of Excellence
- 21 November: Places of Worship
- 9 December: 100 Tahun Persatuan Pandu Puteri Malaysia
- 12 December: Pemerintahan Seri Paduka Baginda Yang Di-Pertuan Agong XIV ALMU'TASIMU BILLAHI MUHIBBUDDIN TUANKU ALHAJ ABDUL HALIM MU'ADZAM SHAH IBNI ALMARHUM SULTAN BADLISHAH
- 20 December: Paralympics Golden Moments in RIO 2016

=== 2017 ===
- 10 January: Malaysian Serama
- 24 January: Festival Food Series - Chinese
- 9 February: Chung Ling High School Centenary
- 21 February: National Definitives Series - Orchids
- 16 March: Festival Food Series - Kadazandusun & Dayak
- 28 March: Festive Greeting
- 24 April: Installation of the XV Yang di-Pertuan Agong Sultan Muhammad V
- 18 May: 100th Anniversary of Oil Palm Industry
- 6 June: Festival Food Series - Malay
- 20 June: Malaysian Batik
- 17 July: Mass Rapid Transit
- 8 August: 50th Anniversary of ASEAN - ASEAN Post (National Flower)
- 19 August: SEA Games 2017
- 1 September: 150 Years Straits Settlements Stamps - Provisional Issue
- 9 September: Special Edition Series III - Their Majesties Yang di-Pertuan Agong of Malaysia
- 14 September: NEGARAKU
- 9 October: World Post Day (Pos-Silang)
- 17 October: Festival Food Series - Indian
- 3 November: Royal Visit of TRH The Prince of Wales & The Duchess of Cornwall - 60 Years Anniversary of Diplomatic Ties Malaysia - United Kingdom
- 8 November: 150th Anniversary Sarawak State Legislative Assembly
- 21 November: Tourist Destinations - Pahang, Perak & Terengganu
- 1 December: 150 Years Straits Settlements - Permanent Issue
- 4 December: Children's Holiday Activities - Stamp Week 2017
- 19 December: #KitaJuara - 29th SEA Games, Kuala Lumpur 2017

=== 2018 ===
- 18 January: Animals With Various Special Roles - Working Dogs
- 30 January: Ornamental Fishes
- 13 February: State Definitive Series - Kelantan (Garden flowers)
- 27 February: Rivers in Malaysia
- 3 March: 100th Anniversary of Yu Hua Kajang School
- 20 March: Electric Train Service (ETS)
- 10 April: Musical Instruments of Malaysia Series 2
- 24 April: Malaysian Citrus
- 17 May: Medicinal Plants Series 4
- 5 June: Tourist Destinations - Sabah
- 28 June: Unique Structures
- 16 July: Telegraph Museum, Taiping
- 23 July: Historical Museums in Malaysia
- 14 August: Blowpipe
- 31 August: National Day 2018
- 16 September: Malaysia Day 2018
- 9 October: World Post Day
- 9 October: 100th Anniversary of Jit Sin High School Penang
- 22 October: Installation of Sultan Sallehuddin Ibni Almarhum Sultan Badlishah, 29th Sultan of Kedah
- 12 November: Malaysian Lifestyle Series 2 - Stamp Week 2018
- 15 November: Malaysia Achievement in 18th Asian Games, Jakarta-Palembang 2018
- 4 December: State Definitive Series - Orchid

=== 2019 ===
- 15 January: Malaysian Festivals Series 3
- 19 February: Exotic Food
- 15 March: Tourist Destinations - Melaka & Sarawak
- 9 April: Honey Bees in Malaysia
- 11 May: Places of Worship Series II
- 19 June: Sour Fruits
- 18 July: 150 Years Sarawak Stamps
- 28 July: Wildlife Conservation
- 30 July: Installation of the XVI Yang di-Pertuan Agong Al-Sultan Abdullah Ri'ayatuddin Al-Mustafa Billah Shah Ibni AlMarhum Sultan Haji Ahmad Shah Al-Musta'in Billah
- 8 August: ASEAN Post - National Costume
- 22 August: Caves in Malaysia
- 16 September: Malaysia Day 2019
- 9 October: World Post Day (Pos-silang - Series 2)
- 21 October: Stamp Week 2019
- 19 November: 50 Years Anniversary of Diplomatic Relations between Malaysia and Romania - Endemic Flowers
- 19 December: Craftsmanship in Malaysia

== 2020s ==
=== 2020 ===
- 6 February: Malaysian Calligraphy - Series II
- 18 June: Iconic Marine Life
- 9 July: Wildflower Series III
- 18 August: Rukun Negara 50 years
- 29 August: Iconic building of Putrajaya
- 16 September: Malaysia Day
- 9 October: World Post Day
- 29 December: World Tallest Tropical Tree
- 31 Dec: 125th Anniversary of Johor's Constitution

=== 2021 ===
- 25 February: Cattle Breeds in Malaysia
- 1 April: 75th Anniversary of Radio Television Malaysia
- 5 August: Hidden Treasure of Malaysia - Island
- 19 August: King of Fruit in Malaysia - Durian
- 9 September: COVID-19 Frontliner
- 9 October: 2021 World Post Day
- 10 November: National Literary Heritage
- 18 November: Edible Flowers
- 2 December: Vanishing Art of Making Traditional Kueh
- 16 December: 100 years of Malaysian Football

=== 2022 ===
- 15 February: Traditional Art of Making Kuih
- 17 March: Endangered Wildlife
- 12 May: Waterfalls in Malaysia
- 23 June: Traditional Boats in Malaysia
- 7 July: 50 Years of Malaysia's First City - Kuala Lumpur
- 10 August: Men's Headgear
- 27 October: Traditional Clothing - Kebaya
- 2 November: Recycling - Circular Economy
- 30 November: 100 Years of Sultan Idris Education University
- 10 December: Leisure Activities - Stamp Week 2022
- 29 December: Malaysian Scholars

=== 2023 ===
- 23 February: Pets
- 13 April: Malay Sultanate Coins
- 18 May: Research Centres in Malaysia
- 27 June: Malaysia's Mountain Ranges
- 27 July: Largest Cengal Tree
- 22 August: Penang Hill Railway Centenary Celebration (1923–2023)
- 16 September: Malaysia Day 2023
- 26 September: National Arts Laureates
- 9 October: World Post Day 2023
- 28 November: Silver Jubilee of DYMM Sultan Terengganu
- 9 December: Lakes in Malaysia - Stamp Week 2023
- 14 December: Free Palestine

=== 2024 ===
- 20 January: Taiping 150th Anniversary
- 6 February: Year of the Dragon 2024
- 27 February: Malay Traditional Firearms
- 26 March: Tradisional Dance
- 4 May: Rescue Vehicle
- 31 May: 50th Anniversary of Malaysia-China Diplomatic Relations
- 24 June: 100th Anniversary of the Causeway
- 20 July: Installation of His Majesty Seri Paduka Baginda Yang di-Pertuan Agong XVII - Sultan Ibrahim
- 8 August: ASEAN POST 2024 - General Post Offices
- 14 September: 100th Anniversary of Malaysia Agriculture, Horticulture & Agro Tourism (MAHA)
- 16 September: Malaysia Day
- 9 October: 150 Years of the Universal Postal Union (UPU) - World Post Day 2024
- 10 November: Iconic Birds of Malaysia - Hornbill
- 5 December: Stamp Week 2024

=== 2025 ===
- 1 January: ASEAN-Malaysia Chairmanship 2025
- 12 February: Snakes
- 8 March: International Women's Day 2025
- 17 April: Silver Jubilee Celebration of HRH Tuanku Syed Sirajuddin Jamalullail, Raja of Perlis' Reign
- 17 May: 160th Anniversary of International Telecommunication Union
- 30 June: Fossil Discoveries in Malaysia
- 30 July: Roses (Series 3)
- 6 September: Visit Selangor Year 2025 & Visit Kedah Year 2025
- 16 September: Malaysia Day
- 9 October: World Post Day
- 13 November: Stamp Week - Classic Animation
- 8 December: 100 Years of Rubber Research

=== 2026 ===
- 22 January: Pottery Heritage in Malaysia
- 24 February: Horses Series 2
- 9 April: National Visual Arts Treasure - Series 3
- 18 April: 125 Years of Institute for Medical Research
- 31 May: Parrot
- 8 June: Visit Malaysia 2026 Campaign

== See also ==
- Stamp collecting
- Malaysian stamps
- Philately
