= Vision University College =

University College in Petaling, Selangor, Malaysia

Coordinates: 3.1060°N 101.5996°E

- Vision University College
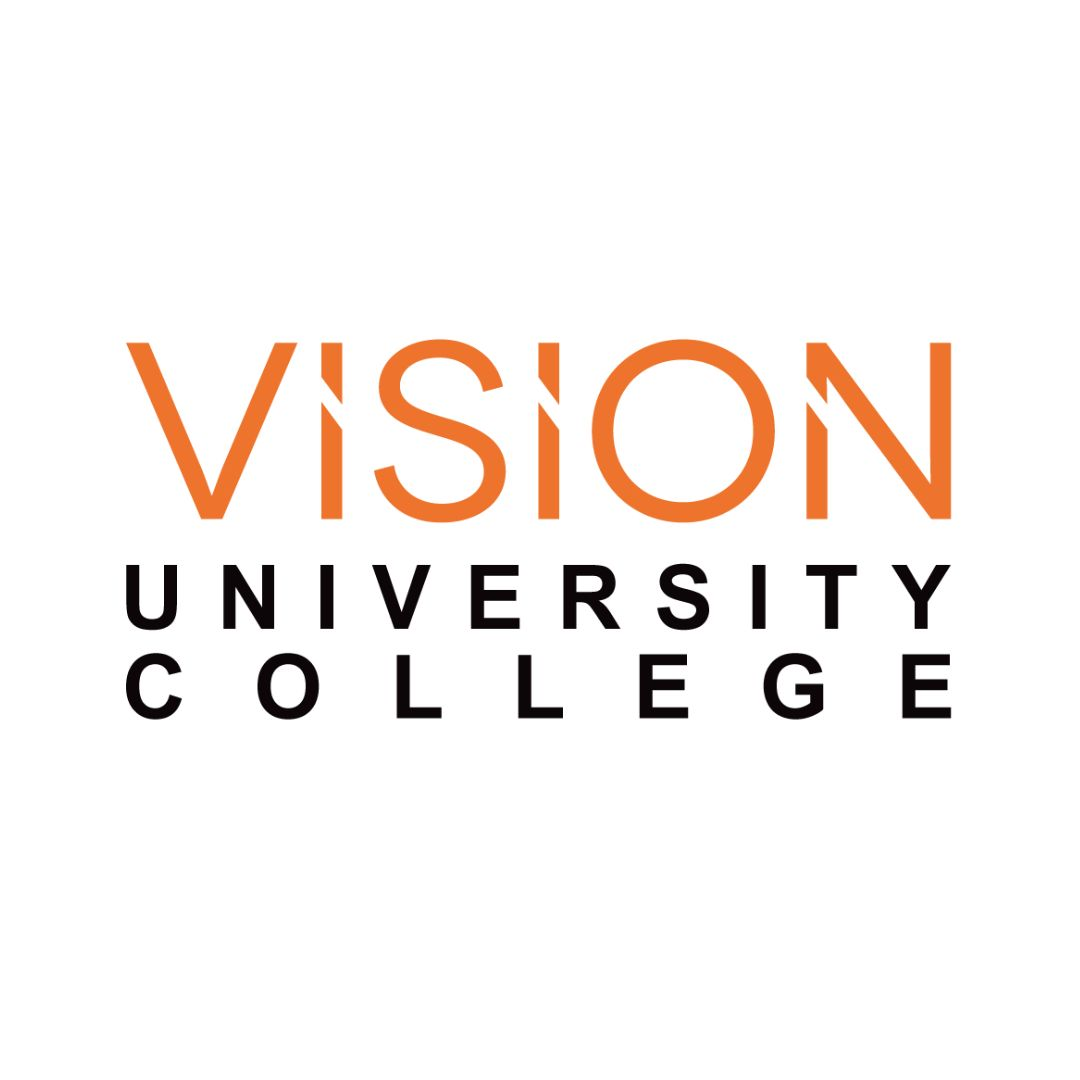
- Motto: Learn·Grow·Excel
- Type: Private
- Established: 2005
- Location: Kelana Jaya, Selangor, Malaysia
- Campus: Urban
- Colours: Orange
- Website: http://www.vision.edu.my

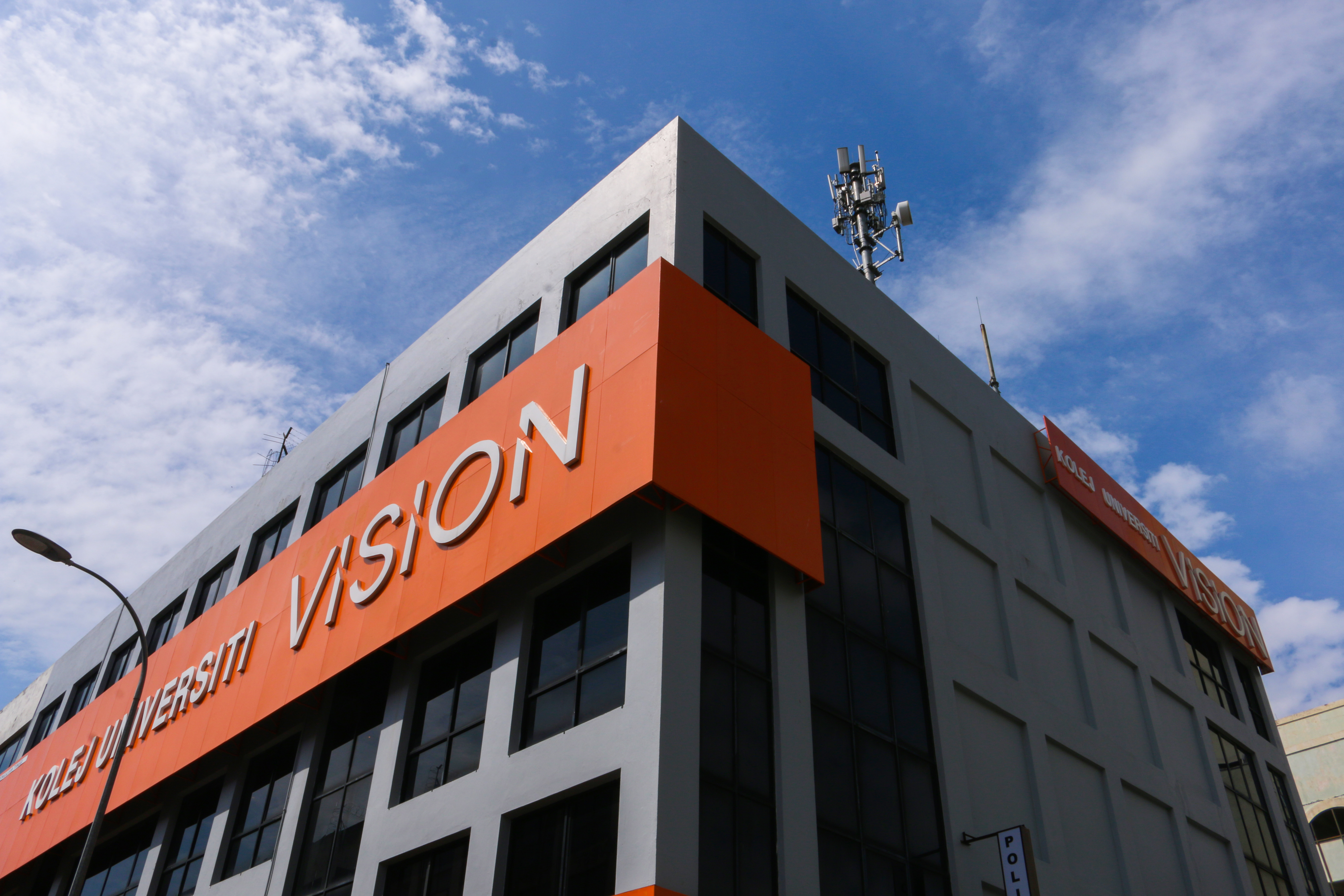

Vision University College is a private university college located in Kelana Jaya, Selangor, Malaysia, with a 50,000 sq ft (4,600 m^{2}) campus. and offers programmes at the foundation, diploma, degree, master's, and doctoral levels in the following fields: ultrasonography, nursing, health science, medical imaging, business, accounting, information technology, and law enforcement.

== Awards and recognition ==
Programmes offered by Vision University College are approved by the Malaysian Qualifications Agency (MQA) and the Ministry of Education (MOE).

The college itself is accredited ISO 9001, and is accorded with a five-star rating by MyQuest.

== Programmes offered ==
=== Health Sciences ===
- Bachelor of Science (Honours) Criminology with Cybersecurity (BCPI)
- Advanced Diploma in Medical Ultrasonography (ADMU)
- Diploma in Medical Imaging (DMI)
- Diploma in Health Science (DHS)
- Disploma in Nursing (DNS)
- Diploma in Physiotherapy (DIP)
- Diploma in Opticianry (DIO)
- Foundation in Science (FIS)

=== Business ===
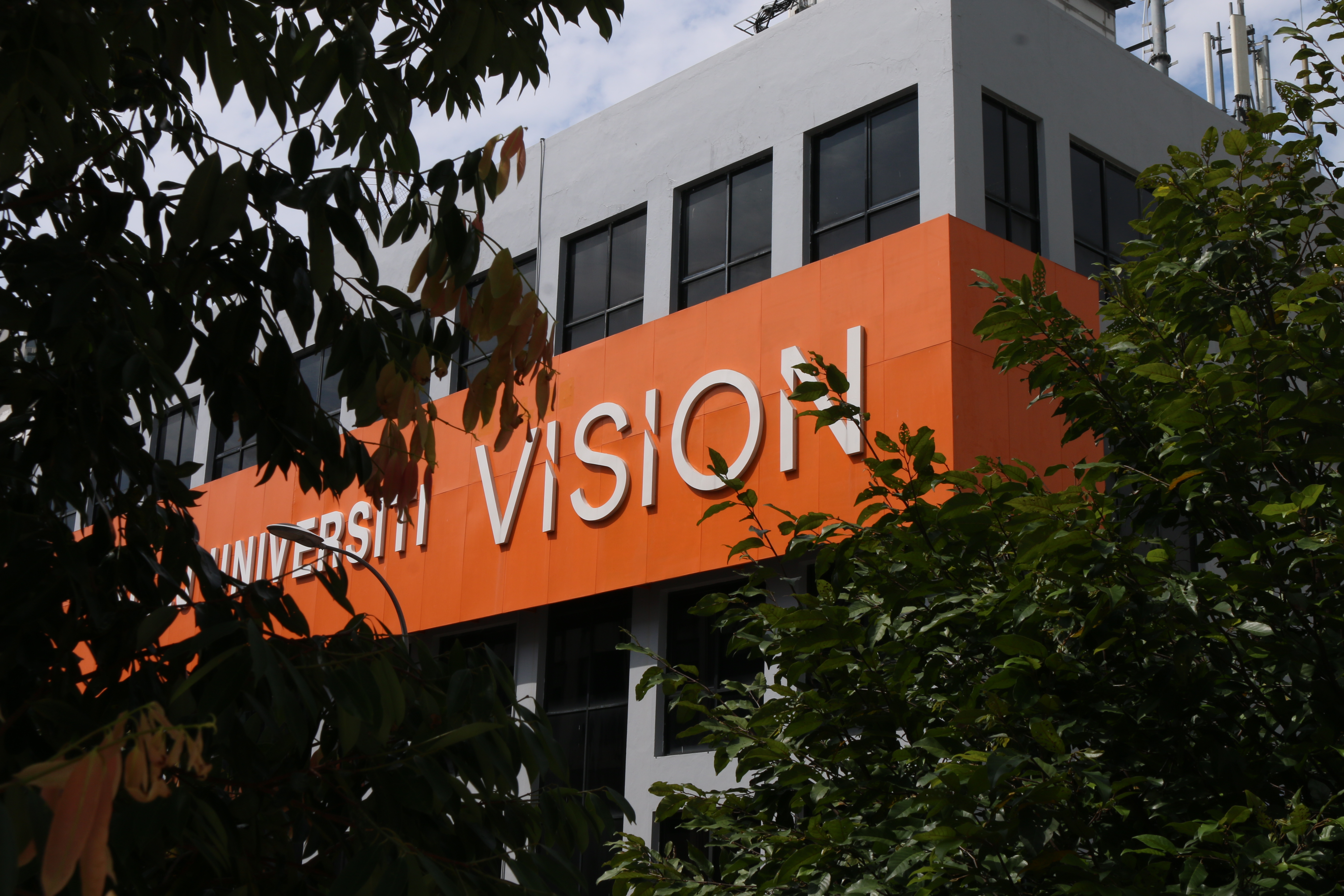

- Doctor of Business Administration
- Master of Business Administration
- Bachelor in Business (Honours) Accounting (BBAF)
- Diploma in Law Enforcement (DLE)
- Diploma in Business Administration (DBA)
- Diploma in Accounting (DIA)
- Diploma in Hotel Management (DHM)
- Diploma in Information Technology (DIT)
- Diploma in Logistics Management (DLM)
- Foundation in Arts (FIA)
