= Asia Pacific University of Technology & Innovation =

Private university in Kuala Lumpur, Malaysia

Coordinates: 3°02′53″N 101°41′33″E

- Universiti Teknologi dan Inovasi Asia Pasifik
- Other name: APU
- Former name: Asia Pacific Institute of Information Technology (1993 - 2004)
- Motto: Nurturing Professionals
- Type: Private
- Established: 1993
- Parent institution: APIIT Education Group
- Academic affiliations: WA; ACU; BEM; MAPCU
- Chairman: Datuk Parmjit Singh
- Vice-Chancellor: Prof. Dr. Ho Chin Kuan
- Location: Bukit Jalil, Technology Park Malaysia, Kuala Lumpur, Malaysia
- Campus: Urban, 11.7 acres (4.7 ha)
- Colours: Verdigris, Alizarin & Sun
- Website: www.apu.edu.my

The Asia Pacific University of Technology and Innovation (APU) is a private university in Malaysia established in 1993 as the Asia Pacific Institute of Information Technology (APIIT). It has produced more than 90,000 graduates under APIIT in association with Staffordshire University. Fifty one percent of its shares are owned by Ekuiti Nasional Berhad.

== History ==
The Asia Pacific Institute of Information Technology (APIIT) was founded in 1993 as part of an initiative by the Malaysian Government to address the shortage of IT Professionals in the country. The newly formed institute was based in Damansara Heights, Kuala Lumpur and offered Diploma courses in computing and IT. In the following year, co-operative links were established with Monash University in Australia, leading to the launch of a twinning program in 1995 for Bachelor's degrees. In 1996, they formed a partnership with Staffordshire University in UK.

The expansion led to the opening of the Kuala Lumpur city campus in 1997, followed by campuses in Karachi, Pakistan (1998), Colombo, Sri Lanka (2000), Lahore, Pakistan (2000), Panipat, India (2001) and Perth, Australia (2004).

In 2003, the Malaysian campus moved to the new premises at Technology Park Malaysia, which was known as APIIT TPM. In March 2017, the Malaysian campus was moved from within the vicinity of the old premises to the new premises location at Jalan Teknologi 5, Technology Park Malaysia. The old premises now houses "APIIT Sdn Bhd" which cater for IT Professional Development Courses.

The curriculum had since developed, with the institution being recognized as a SUN and Microsoft authorized training center. In 1998, the institution became an SAP University Alliance Partner. APIIT attained university college status in 2004, and was renamed to Asia Pacific University College of Technology & Innovation (UCTI) and further renamed to Asia Pacific University of Technology & Innovation (APU) after attaining university status.

University rankings

Global – Overall
- QS World: =597 (2026)

Regional – Overall
- QS Asia: =147 (2026)

== See also ==
- List of universities in Malaysia
