= Asia Pacific Institute of Information Technology =

Educational institution in Kuala Lumpur

- Motto: IT Training For Professionals By Professionals
- Type: Private
- Established: 1993
- Affiliation: Asia Pacific University of Technology & Innovation
- Students: 9000
- Location: Kuala Lumpur, Malaysia
- Campus: Technology Park Malaysia (TPM)
- Website: www.apiit.edu.my

The Asia Pacific Institute of Information Technology (APIIT) is an educational organisation that provides education and training programs in computing and information technology. Founded by Datuk Parmjit Singh and originally based in Malaysia, APIIT has since established other centers in Pakistan, India, and Sri Lanka. The institute collaborates with selected universities in the United Kingdom and has produced more than 14,000 graduates.

== History ==
Asia Pacific IIT was founded in 1993 as part of the Malaysian Government's initiative to address the country's shortage of IT Professionals. The newly formed Institute was based in Damansara Heights, Kuala Lumpur, and offered Diploma courses in computing and IT.

In the following year, cooperative links were established with Monash University in Australia, leading to the launch of a twinning program in 1995 for Bachelor's degrees. This was followed in 1996 by a twinning relationship with Staffordshire University in UK for master's degree courses.

Expansion led to the opening of the Kuala Lumpur city campus in 1997, followed by campuses in Karachi, Pakistan (1998), Colombo, Sri Lanka (2000), Lahore, Pakistan (2000), Panipat, India (2001) and Perth, Australia (2004). In 2003, the Malaysian campus moved to new premises at Technology Park Malaysia, now known as APIIT TPM.

The curriculum has since developed. In 1998, the institution was recognized as a SUN and Microsoft authorized training center, a SAP University Alliance Partner in 1999, and a Microsoft Certified Technical Education Center in 2001. APIIT gained University College status in 2004.

== Programs and courses ==
Courses are run at four levels: foundation, diploma, degree, and postgraduate. It also offers English courses at its English Language Center for international and local students. Students interested in engineering courses offered by APIIT can apply to its BTech course through the NAT 2016 online exam that will be conducted on 3 June 2016.

=== Foundation program (Pre-university) ===
The one-year foundation program caters to students who have completed Form 5 studies and prepares them to enter a degree course.

=== Diploma programs ===
- Diploma in Information and Communication Technology
- Diploma in Information and Communication Technology with a specialism in Software Engineering
- Diploma in Business with IT

=== Staffordshire University degree ===
- BSc (Hons) in Computing with specialisms in:
  - Computing
  - Web Development
  - Multimedia Computing
  - Software Engineering
  - Mobile Computing
  - Artificial Intelligence
  - Knowledge Management
  - Computer Security
  - Biometrics
  - Data Analytics
  - Information Systems
- BSc (Hons) in Business Computing with specialisms in:
  - Business Computing
  - Management
  - E-Marketing
- BSc (Hons) in Business Information Technology
- BSc (Hons) in E-Commerce
- BSc (Hons) Engineering

=== Postgraduate programs ===
Seven MSc programs are run: "Software Engineering," "Technology Management," "Information Technology Management," "Multimedia Applications Management," "Electronic Commerce," "Mobile Computer Systems" and "Computing."

== APU TPM, Malaysia ==
The Malaysia campus situated (at 03°02′54″N 101°41′33″E) is a purpose-built complex in Technology Park Malaysia, about 20 km south of Kuala Lumpur center, close to the suburb of Bukit Jalil and National Sports Complex.

=== Facilities ===
The basic building for classes houses lecture rooms, an auditorium, a multi-purpose hall, offices, discussion rooms, social space, a cafeteria, a library, computer labs, and research and development facilities. The library affords access to eJournals and databases, some by arrangement with Staffordshire University. The cafeteria caters to APIIT students and employees from other companies within the vicinity of Technology Park Malaysia.

Student accommodation is available locally in Vista Komanwel Condominiums, Fortune Park apartments and Endah Promenade Condomoniums. A shuttle bus service operates between the accommodation and campus. Initiative students may also go for alternatives such as renting an apartment themselves, saving them more money during their study period. 7-Eleven, located in Arena Green apartments, provides a posting board about apartment and car-park rentals, with a usual price range from RM700 – RM850 per unit, depending on facilities provided by the unit's tenant.

=== New campus ===
APIIT has plans to build a new campus in Technology Park Malaysia by the end of 2014, which has been said to be completed since 2011. Due to delays, the new campus was completed in March 2017.

=== Transport links ===
The campus is close to Bukit Jalil LRT station which provides electric trains to various parts of Kuala Lumpur and Selangor. It has excellent road links, by being situated close to the main PLUS North–South Expressway, KESAS Shah Alam Expressway, and LDP Puchong–Sungai Besi Highway.

== See also ==
- Asia Pacific University of Technology & Innovation (APU)
