= Malaysian batik =

Type of Malaysian cloth dyeing

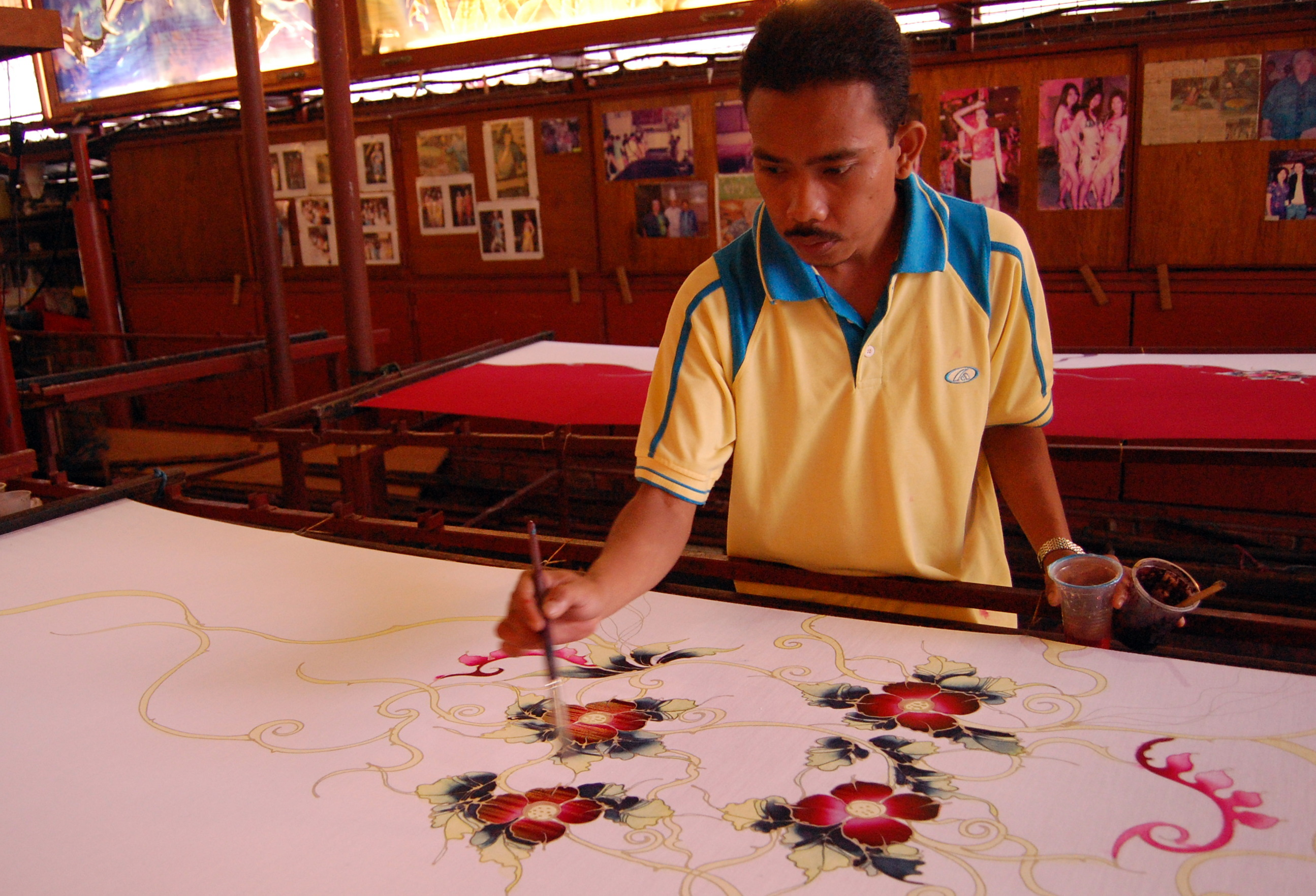
- A batik craftsman making batik. Malaysian batik are usually patterned with floral motifs with light colouring.
- Type: Art fabric
- Material: Cambrics, silk, cotton
- Place of origin: Malaysia

Malaysian batik is batik textile art as produced in Malaysia, especially on the east coast of the Malay Peninsula (42% comes from Kelantan, 36% from Terengganu and 22% from Pahang). The most popular motifs are leaves and flowers. Malaysian batik depicting humans or animals are rare because Islam norms forbid animal images as decoration. However, the butterfly theme is a common exception. Malaysian batik is also famous for its geometrical designs, such as spirals. The method of Malaysian batik making is also quite different from those of Indonesian Javanese batik, the pattern is larger and simpler, it seldom or never uses canting to create intricate patterns and relies heavily on brush painting method to apply colours on fabrics. The colours also tend to be lighter and more vibrant than the deep coloured Javanese batik.

In line with the Malaysia concept, the Malaysian government is now endorsing Malaysian batik as a national dress to every level of the general population, by having local designers create new batik designs which reflect the Malaysia idea.

In Malaysia, batik is also considered a cultural icon, with "Malaysian Batik Day" (in Malay: Hari Batik Malaysia) celebrated every year on 3 December. Many Malaysians continue to wear Malaysian batik every day for both casual and formal events.

== History ==
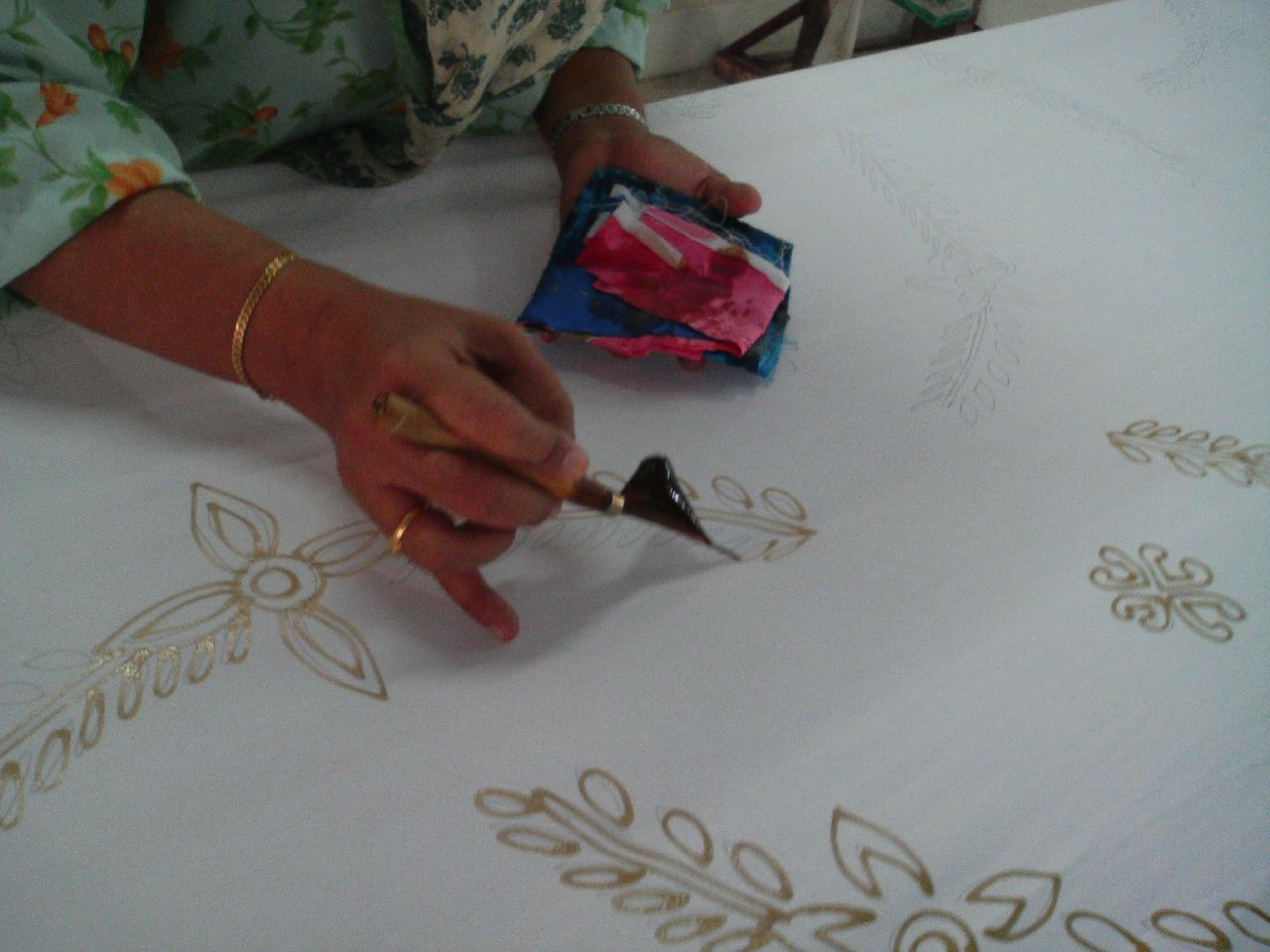
The drawing of Malaysian batik

The origin of batik production in Malaysia it is known trade relations between the Melayu Kingdom in Jambi and Javanese coastal cities have thrived since the 13th century, the northern coastal batik producing areas of Java (Cirebon, Lasem, Tuban, and Madura) has influenced Jambi batik. This Jambi (Sumatran) batik, as well as Javanese batik, has influenced the batik craft in the Malay Peninsula.

According to the Museum of Cultural History of Oslo, it is known for certain that the Javanese influenced Malay batik-making technically as well as in the development of designs. At an early stage the Malaysians used wooden blocks in order to produce batik-like textiles. As late as the 1920s Javanese batik makers introduced the use of wax and copper blocks on Malaysia's east coast. The production of hand drawn batik in Malaysia is of recent date and is related to the Javanese batik tulis.

Commercial production started in the 1960s. This craft has developed its own particular aesthetic and design, particular to Malaysia. The new Malaysian batik is clearly different from the Javanese tradition of hand-painted batiks.

Malaysian batik can be found on the east coast of Malaysia such as Kelantan, Terengganu and Pahang, while batik in Johor clearly shows Javanese and Sumatran influences owing to the large Javanese and Sumatran populations in southern Malaysia.

== Culture ==
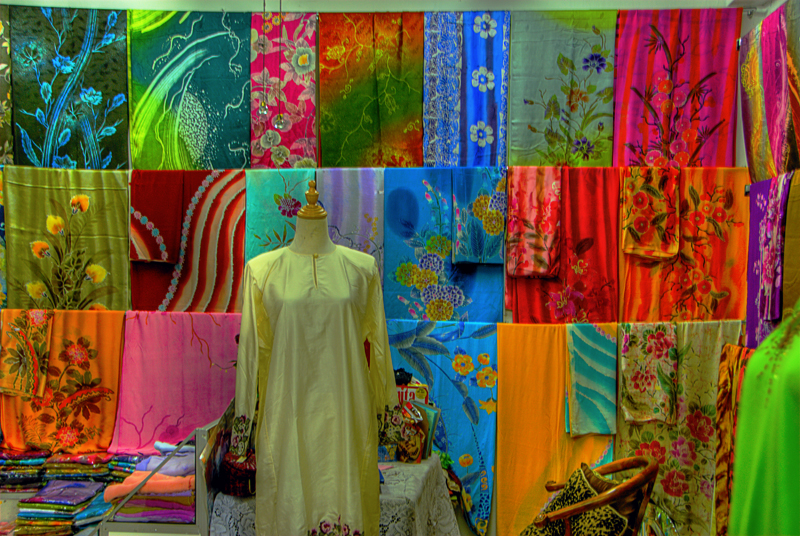
A batik shop in Malaysia selling a variety of Malaysian batik

Batik was mentioned in the 17th century Malay Annals. The legend goes when Laksamana Hang Nadim was ordered by Sultan Mahmud to sail to India to get 140 pieces of serasah cloth (batik) with 40 types of flowers depicted on each. Unable to find any that fulfilled the requirements explained to him, he made up his own. On his return unfortunately, his ship sank and he only managed to bring four pieces, earning displeasure from the Sultan.

For men, batik can be worn at dinner functions. Women wear the fabric as part of formal dress, combining batik with modern fashion. The Malaysian government encourages civil servants to wear batik during the 1st and 15th day of the month. In Sabah, East Malaysia, teachers are encouraged to wear batik shirts or baju kurung to school on Thursdays; usually the school will have a particular patterned fabric which will be provided to every teacher to take to the tailor, so that their clothing matches.

== Events ==
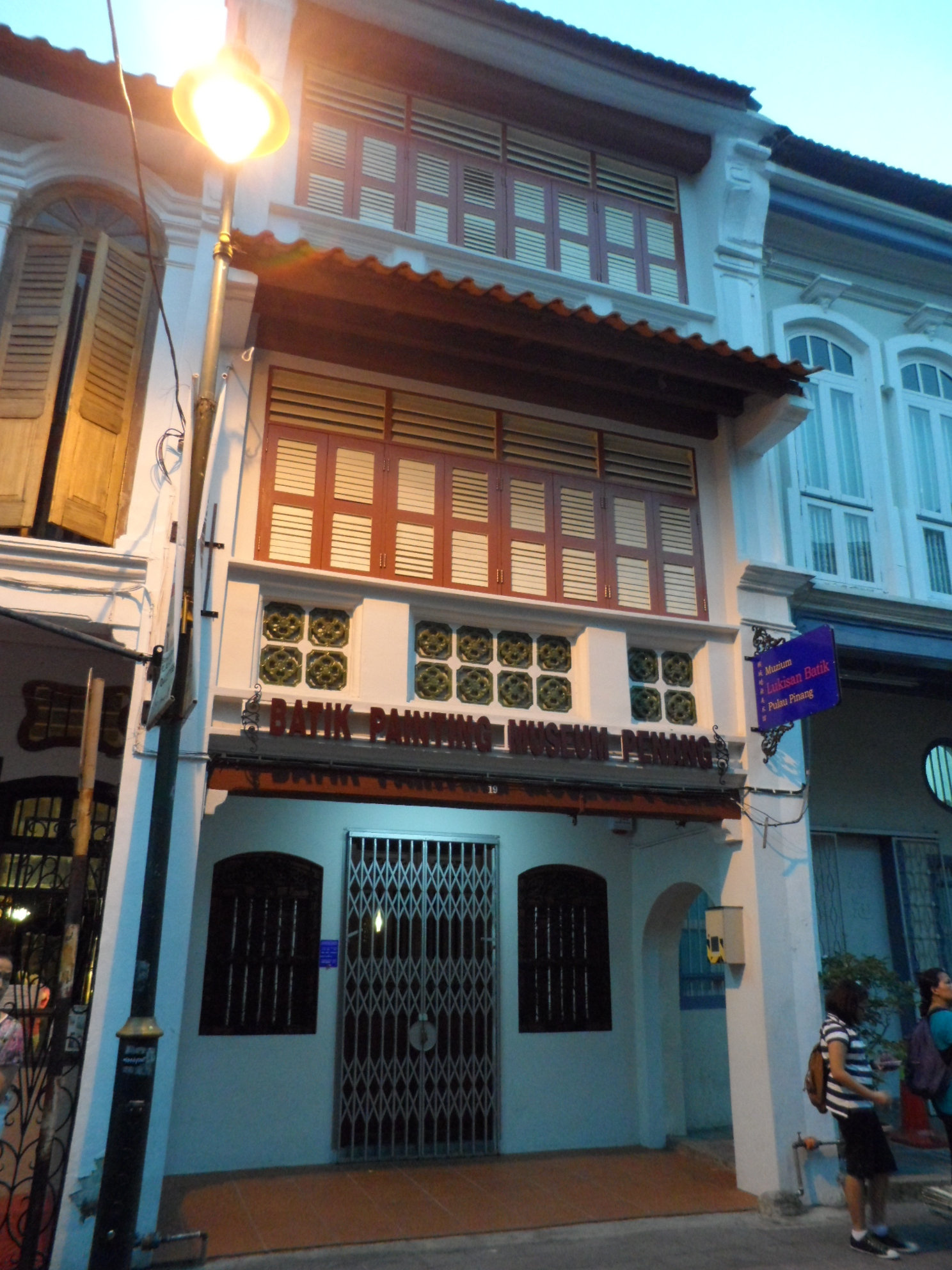
Batik Painting Museum in Penang

- Kuala Lumpur International Batik (KLIB) Convention and Exhibition is a biennial event under the Malaysia Batik - Crafted For the World movement, it brings in speakers from various countries (including Singapore, Indonesia, India, Australia, Sri Lanka, Azerbaijan, and Japan), and holds a three-day batik exhibition.
- The annual Piala Seri Endon Batik designing competition organized by the Yayasan Budi Penyayang. Winners of this prestigious batik competition includes famous batik designers such as Masrina Abdullah, Nizam Ambia, BUJINS, Shukri Che Ya, Ziyan Batik, Alana Ilham and many others.

== See also ==
- Batik
