= Kelana Jaya =

Coordinates: 13°06′10.4″N 101°36′07.4″E

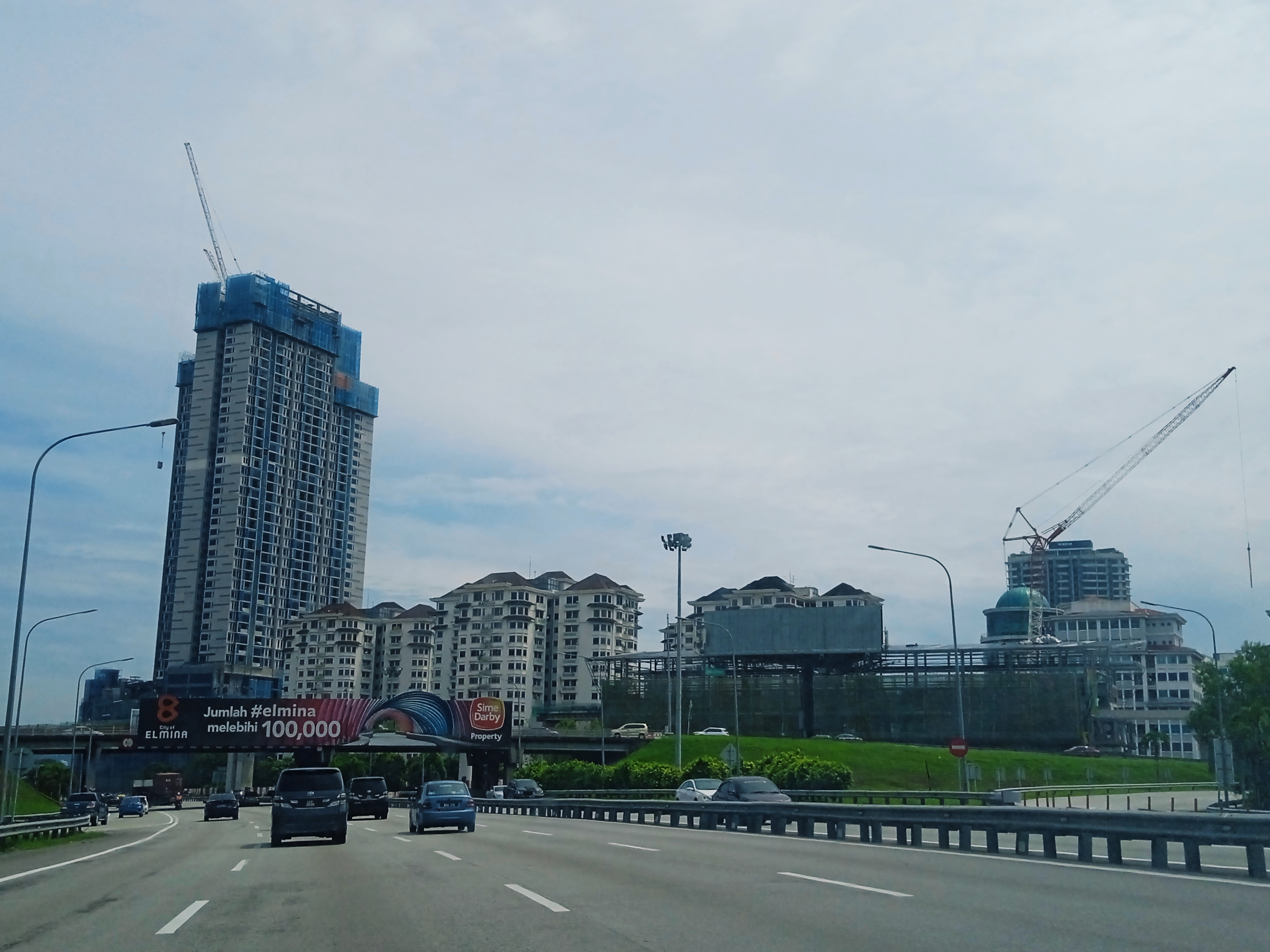
- A view of Kelana Jaya
- Interactive map of Kelana Jaya
- Country: Malaysia
- State: Selangor
- District: Petaling District

Kelana Jaya is a suburb of Petaling Jaya city, in the state of Selangor, Malaysia, comprising sections SS3, SS4, SS5, SS6, and SS7. The Damansara–Puchong Expressway cuts through this neighbourhood. The shopping mall Paradigm Mall is located here.

== Education ==
=== Primary schools ===
- SRK Kelana Jaya (1) and (2)
- SRK Sri Kelana
- Nobel International School

=== Secondary schools ===
- SMK Kelana Jaya
- SMK Lembah Subang
- SMK Sri Permata
- Nobel International School
- Sri Emas International School

=== Universities ===
- UNITAR International University
- INNOVATIVE Universtiy Collage

== Places of worship ==
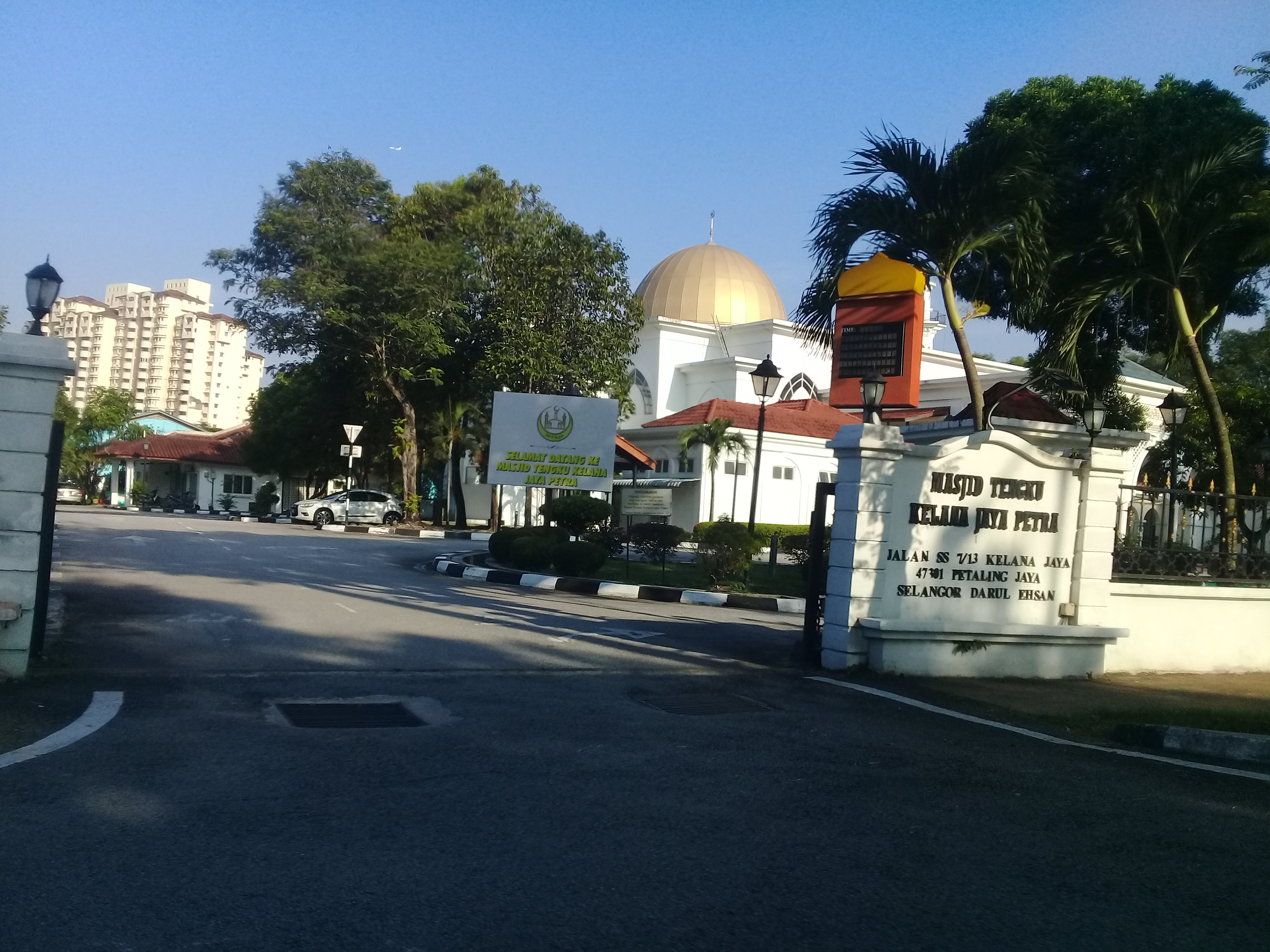
Masjid Tengku Kelana Jaya Petra

- Tengku Kelana Jaya Petra Mosque
- Tabung Haji Mosque (Hajj Pilgrims Complex)
- Al-Hidayah Mosque
- Nurul Yaqin Mosque
- Malaysian Buddhist Cooperative Society (MBCS)
- Selangor Buddhist Vipassana Meditation Society
- Malaysian Usnisa Vijaya Buddhist Association (MUVBA)
- Fo Guang Shan Malaysia PJSS3
- St. Ignatius Catholic Church
- Sri Sakthi Easwari Hindu Temple
- Sri Maha Mariamman Seaport Hindu Temple
- Sergeant Revindran Palace

== Facilities ==
Kelana Jaya Youth Park

Kelana Jaya Medical Centre

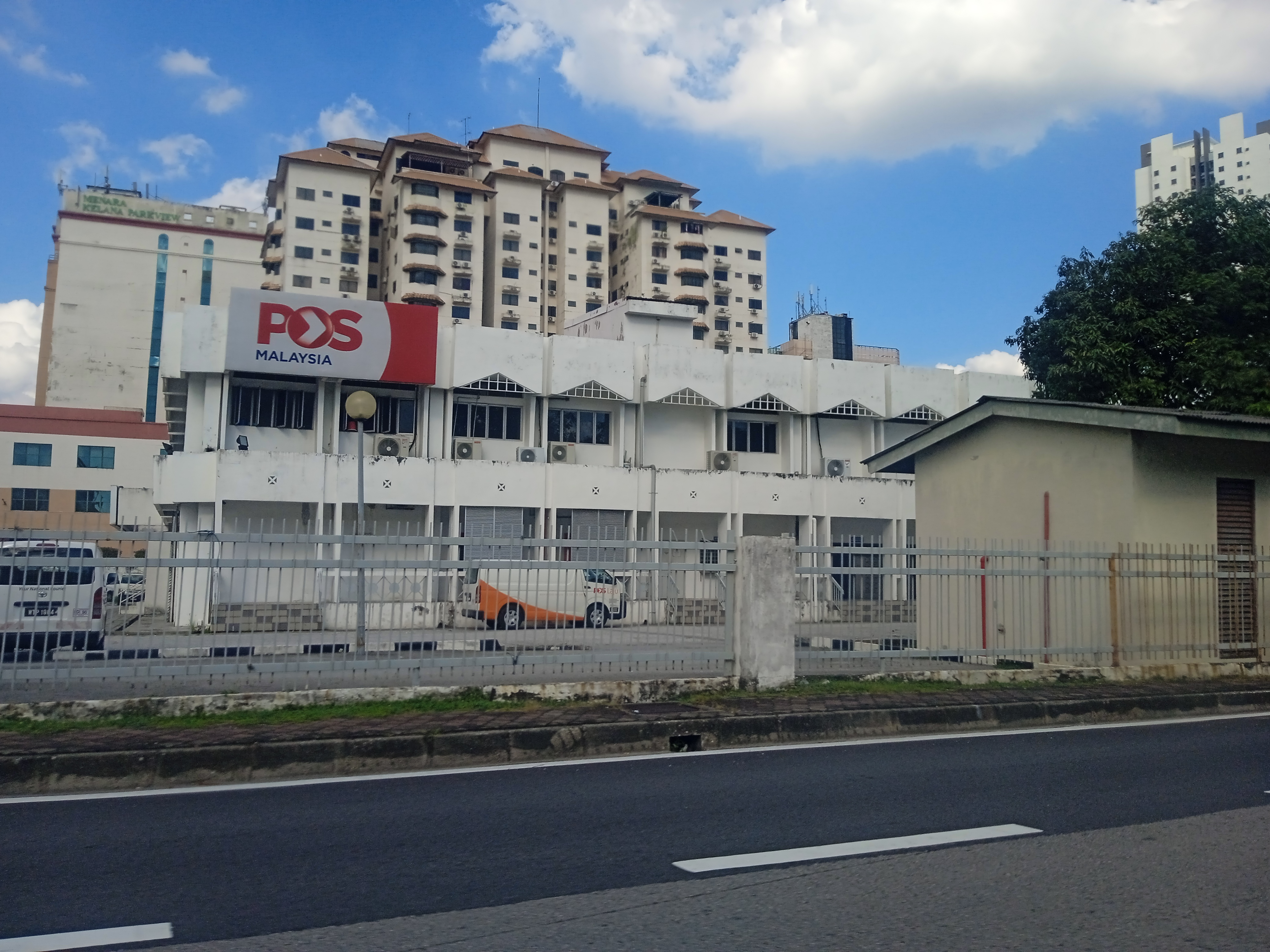
Kelana Jaya Post Office.

Kelana Jaya has a wealth of recreational facilities. One major attraction in Kelana Jaya is the Kelana Jaya Youth Park in SS7. Many people from other areas of Petaling Jaya and the neighbouring Subang Jaya come to this park on weekends to unwind and relax among the greenery. Fishing in the largest lake is also popular. Next to the park is a collection of community recreational facilities such as a public swimming pool and courts for badminton, futsal, hockey, and tennis. The 20,000-seater Petaling Jaya Stadium is also located near the park. The Perbadanan Kemajuan Negeri Selangor Sports Complex is very popular and further down the expressway from the lake park.

== Commerce ==
Paradigm Mall

In May 2012, a large shopping centre called Paradigm Mall opened in SS7. It has a cinema, a Lotus's supermarket, plenty of retail stores and eateries, and is located right at the centre of Kelana Jaya, within walking distance from most of the housing estates.

Every year, a street bazaar opens daily on Jalan SS6/1 during the fasting month of Ramadhan, selling plenty of local delights in time for the evening breaking of fast or fasts.

== Accommodation ==
In SS6:

- TH Hotel
- Sun Inns
- Goodhope Hotel Kelana Jaya
- Goodhope Hotel Kelana Mall
- Best View Hotel
- Hotel YP Boutique

In SS7:

- New World Petaling Jaya Hotel (opening 2017 - in the top 12 floors of a 32-level mixed-use tower next to Paradigm Mall)
- Eiffel Hotel

== Accessibility ==
The main routes into Kelana Jaya are via the Damansara–Puchong Expressway and the Federal Highway, which forms the southern border of the neighbourhood.

=== Public transport ===
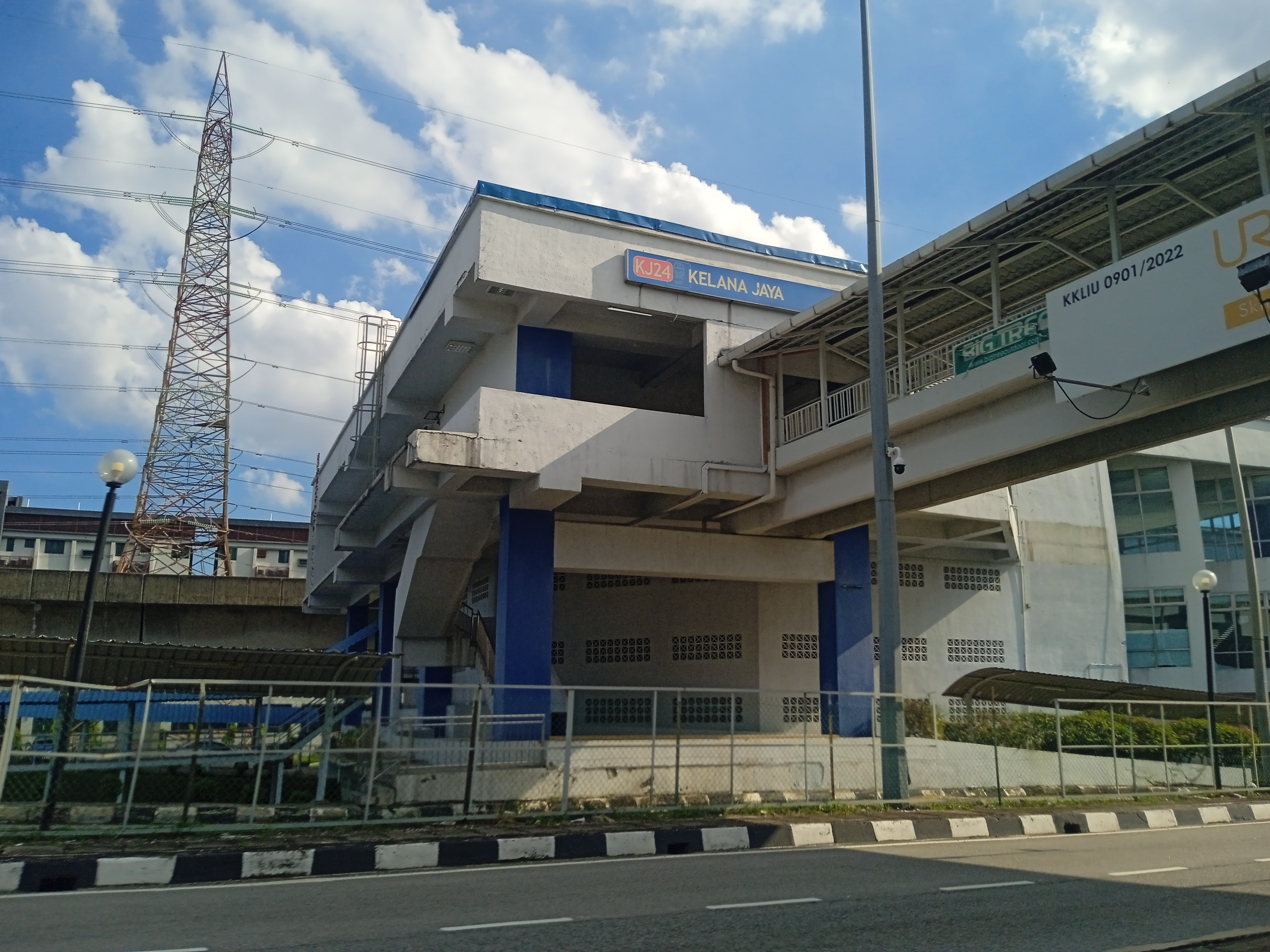
Kelana Jaya Station

Kelana Jaya is well served by public transport. The Kelana Jaya LRT station is located at SS4. This station also acts as a bus and taxi hub with buses from this station going out to the rest of Kelana Jaya and adjacent suburbs such as Bandar Utama, Cyberjaya, Putrajaya, and Subang Jaya. Taman Bahagia LRT station, Lembah Subang LRT station and Ara Damansara LRT station are also nearby. Buses which serve the Kelana Jaya SS7 area are T607 and T624. This station also happens to be the namesake of the Kelana Jaya line, which serves the station
