= Ekuinas =

Malaysian private equity company

Ekuiti Nasional Berhad
- Company type: Government-owned private limited company
- Industry: Private equity
- Founded: 1 September 2009; 16 years ago
- Headquarters: Surian Tower; Mutiara Damansara, Petaling Jaya, Malaysia
- Key people: Tan Sri Shahril Ridza Ridzuan (Chairman); Dato' Syed Yasir Arafat Syed Abd Kadir (CEO)
- Revenue: ▲RM43.3 million (2014)
- Net income: ▼RM14.4 million (2014)
- AUM: ▲RM4.1 billion (2014)
- Total assets: ▲RM63.2 million (2014)
- Parent: Yayasan Ekuiti Nasional
- Website: www.ekuinas.com.my

Ekuiti Nasional Berhad (Ekuinas) is a private equity company owned by the Government of Malaysia. It was formed in 2009 to promote Bumiputera economic participation through the creation of innovative companies and to advance the private equity industry in Malaysia.

Ekuinas manages funds worth in excess of RM3 billion which have interests in six core sectors: retail food and beverages, fast-moving consumer goods, oil and gas, services, education and healthcare. Among the companies and institutions which Ekuinas funds have substantial shareholdings are Alliance Cosmetics Group, ILMU Education Group, Icon Offshore Berhad, Orkim Sdn Bhd, and the Malaysian franchises of Manhattan Fish Market and Tony Roma's.

Ekuinas reported a gross portfolio return of RM591.3 million for its Ekuinas Direct (Tranche I) Fund which translates to a gross annualised Internal Rate of Return (IRR) of 14.8% and a net annualised IRR of 10.9% in 2015.
