= 2026 National Women's Futsal Championship =

National Women's Futsal Championship.
- Season: 2026
- Champions: MBSJ FC
- Top goalscorer: Fatin Shahida Azmi, Farahiyah Ridzuan (9 goals)
- All statistics correct as of 24 January 2026.

2026 National Women's Futsal Championship (Malay: Kejohanan Futsal Wanita Kebangsaan 2026) was the twelfth season of the National Women's Futsal Championship, the Malaysian professional futsal league for association football clubs, specifically for women since its establishment in 2007. It is run by the Football Association of Malaysia. 8 teams compete in grouping round, divided into 2 groups. Melaka are the defending champions.

== Teams ==
- ATM
- (Selangor) MBPJ
- (Selangor) MBSJ
- (Selangor) MSU
- Negeri Sembilan
- (Selangor) Perdana BTR
- Selangor
- (Selangor) UiTM Lioness

== Standings ==
=== Group stage ===
==== Group A ====
Pos	Team	Pld	W	D	L	GF	GA	GD	Pts	Qualification or relegation
1	MBSJ	3	3	0	0	21	3	+18	9	Advance to Knock-out stage
2	UiTM Lioness	3	2	0	1	6	6	0	6	Advance to Knock-out stage
3	Selangor	3	1	0	2	6	15	−9	3	
4	ATM	3	0	0	3	2	11	−9	0	

Updated to match(es) played on 20 January 2026. Source: FAM-CMS
Rules for classification: 1) Points; 2) Goal difference; 3) Number of goals scored.

==== Fixtures and results ====
18 January 2026
16:00 UTC+8

UiTM Lioness	3–1	Selangor
	Report

FAM Futsal Arena, Kelana Jaya

18 January 2026
18:00 UTC+8

ATM	0–6	MBSJ
	Report

FAM Futsal Arena, Kelana Jaya

19 January 2026
14:00 UTC+8

ATM	0–1	UiTM Lioness
	Report

FAM Futsal Arena, Kelana Jaya

19 January 2026
18:00 UTC+8

MBSJ	10–1	Selangor
	Report

FAM Futsal Arena, Kelana Jaya

20 January 2026
14:00 UTC+8

MBSJ	5–2	UiTM Lioness
	Report

FAM Futsal Arena, Kelana Jaya

20 January 2026
18:00 UTC+8

Selangor	4–2	ATM
	Report

FAM Futsal Arena, Kelana Jaya

==== Group B ====
Pos	Team	Pld	W	D	L	GF	GA	GD	Pts	Qualification or relegation
1	Perdana BTR	3	3	0	0	18	3	+15	9	Advance to Knock-out stage
2	MBPJ	3	2	0	1	26	5	+21	6	Advance to Knock-out stage
3	MSU	3	0	1	2	4	16	−12	1	
4	Negeri Sembilan	3	0	1	2	3	27	−24	1	

Updated to match(es) played on 20 January 2026. Source: FAM-CMS
Rules for classification: 1) Points; 2) Goal difference; 3) Number of goals scored.

==== Fixtures and results ====
18 January 2026
14:00 UTC+8

MBPJ	13–0	Negeri Sembilan
	Report

FAM Futsal Arena, Kelana Jaya

18 January 2026
20:30 UTC+8

Perdana BTR	3–0	MSU FT
	Report

FAM Futsal Arena, Kelana Jaya

19 January 2026
16:00 UTC+8

Negeri Sembilan	0–11	Perdana BTR
	Report

FAM Futsal Arena, Kelana Jaya

19 January 2026
20:30 UTC+8

MSU FT	1–10	MBPJ
	Report

FAM Futsal Arena, Kelana Jaya

20 January 2026
16:00 UTC+8

Perdana BTR	4–3	MBPJ
	Report

FAM Futsal Arena, Kelana Jaya

20 January 2026
20:30 UTC+8

MSU FT	3–3	Negeri Sembilan
	Report

FAM Futsal Arena, Kelana Jaya

=== Knock-out stage ===
Semifinals
1A	MBSJ	4
2B	MBPJ	1
1B	Perdana BTR	2
2A	UiTM Lioness	1

Final
MBSJ	2
Perdana BTR	1
Third place play-off
MBPJ	2 (3)
UiTM Lioness	2 (5)

==== Semi-finals ====
22 January 2026	MBSJ	4–1	MBPJ	Kelana Jaya
14:00 UTC+8	Nur Syafiqah 12', 39'; Fatin Shahida 13', 26'	Report	Norazizah Jamal 38'	Stadium: FAM Futsal Arena; Referee: Siti Noraidah Ahmad

22 January 2026	Perdana BTR	2–1	UiTM Lioness	Kelana Jaya
17:00 UTC+8	Nur Imanina 32', 37'	Report	Harizah Ani 11'	Stadium: FAM Futsal Arena; Referee: Nurul Atikah Jannah @ Zainal

==== Third place play-off ====
24 January 2026	MBPJ	2–2 (3–5 p)	UiTM Lioness	Kelana Jaya
14:00 UTC+8	Farahiyah Ridzuan 14', 32'	Report	Nurfarisya Hanim 4'; Intan Nur Ameelia 9'	Stadium: FAM Futsal Arena; Referee: Zulhilmi Haikal Zamrisham
	Penalties
	Atiqah (penalty missed); Asnidah (penalty scored); Fazira (penalty scored); Zunadzirah (penalty scored)		(penalty scored) Ku Nuwairah; (penalty scored) Dhiyaa Addin; (penalty scored) Norhawa; (penalty scored) Ayuna Anjani; (penalty scored) Kaseh Carmila

==== Final ====
24 January 2026	MBSJ	2–1	Perdana BTR	Kelana Jaya
17:00 UTC+8	Syafiqah Zainal 30'; Asma Junaidi 39' (o.g.)	Report	Nurin Umairah 21'	Stadium: FAM Futsal Arena

== Winners ==
Champions of 2026 National Women's Futsal Championship

MBSJ
2nd Titles

== Season statistics ==
=== Top goalscorers ===
As of 24 January 2026

Rank	Player	Team	Goals
1	(Malaysia) Farahiyah Ridzuan	MBPJ	9
1	(Malaysia) Fatin Shahida	MBSJ	9
3	(Malaysia) Asnidah Zamri	MBPJ	7
4	(Malaysia) Syafiqah Zainal Abidin	MBSJ	6
4	(Malaysia) Imanina Aqilah	Perdana BTR	6
6	(Malaysia) Nur Lyana	Perdana BTR	4
6	(Malaysia) Dhiyaa Addin	UiTM Lioness	4
8	(Malaysia) Nur Fazira Sani	MBPJ	3
8	(Malaysia) Thurgasini	MBPJ	3
8	(Malaysia) Shazreen Munazli	MBSJ	3
8	(Malaysia) Nurin Umairah	Perdana BTR	3
8	(Malaysia) Shadrina Ahmad Johari	Selangor	3
13	(Malaysia) Zunadzirah Zuzaili	MBPJ	2
13	(Malaysia) Salmi Norain	MBPJ	2
13	(Malaysia) Farah Wahida	MBSJ	2
13	(Malaysia) Nur Ain Razali	MSU FT	2
13	(Malaysia) Nurin Batrisyia	Perdana BTR	2
