= Nur Lyana =

Malaysian women's footballer (born 1999)

Nur Lyana Soberi
Personal information
- Full name: Nur Lyana binti Soberi
- Date of birth: 18 June 1999 (age 27)
- Place of birth: Kedah, Malaysia
- Height: 1.58 m (5 ft 2 in)
- Position: Midfielder

Team information
- Current team: Kelana United
- Number: 5

Senior career*
Years	Team	Apps	(Gls)
2018–2020	Kedah FA		
2021–2022	Melaka FA		
2022–2023	MBSJ		
2023	Selangor		
2023–2024	KFF Presingu		
2024	MBSJ		
2025–	Kelana United		

International career
- Malaysia futsal
2022–	Malaysia		
Medal record
Women's futsal
SEA Games
Bronze medal – third place	2021 Hanoi	Futsal
Women's football
SAFF Women's IFT
Bronze medal – third place	2023 SAFF Women's
Friendly match
Runner-up	FIWF Series 2022
- * Club domestic league appearances and goals

Nur Lyana binti Soberi (born 18 June 1999) is a Malaysian women's footballer who currently plays as a midfielder for Malaysia National Women's League club Kelana United and the Malaysia national team. She also plays for Malaysia futsal team.

== Career ==
Lyana started her career as a football player. She also plays futsal and field hockey in 2021. In 2018, Lyana played with Kedah FA in the Piala Tun Sharifah Rodziah. She successfully won the cup in the 2018 season. In 2021, Lyana also played field hockey in the Tun Razak Cup tournament with Kedah.

On 24 March 2022, Lyana won the 2022 Malaysia Premier Futsal League (women) with Melaka FA women's futsal. On 20 May 2022, she also won a bronze medal with the Malaysia women's national futsal team at the 2021 SEA Games tournament held in Hanoi, Vietnam.

In June 2022, Lyana was selected to compete in the 2022 FIFA International Women's Football Series held in Bangladesh. She won a silver medal with the Malaysia women's national football team. In September 2022, Lyana excelled with the Melaka FA team when she won the 2022 Piala Tun Sharifah Rodziah.

In early 2023, Lyana joined MBSJ FC to compete in the FAS Women's Super League tournament and successfully won the 2023 season. She was also named the MVP player that season.

In August 2023, Lyana joined Selangor. After that, she signed a contract with the Kosovo club KFF Presingu. On 3 October 2023, Lyana was listed in the Women's International Friendly Tournament held in Saudi Arabia. She managed to win the bronze medal after the Malaysian women's squad defeated the Saudi Arabian women's squad 1–0 in the third place match in the tournament.

In 2024, Lyana returned to Malaysia after completing her contract with KFF Presingu. She joined MBSJ FC and Selangor in the 2024 season. In 2025, Lyana signed a contract with Kelana United FC to compete in the 2025 Malaysia National Women's League.

== Honours ==
Football

- SAFF Women's International Friendly Tournament: 2023
- FIFA International Women's Football Series: 2022
- Piala Tun Sharifah Rodziah: 2018, 2022

Futsal

- MPFL Women: 2022
- SEA Games: Bronze 2021

Individual

- FAS Women's Super League: 2023 MVP player
