= Malaysia Premier Futsal League (women) =

National Women's Futsal Championship
- Organising body: Football Association of Malaysia (FAM)
- Founded: 2007; 19 years ago (as Malaysia Premier Futsal League (Women); 2026; 0 years ago (as National Women's Futsal Championship)
- Country: Malaysia
- Confederation: AFC
- Divisions: 1
- Number of clubs: 8
- Level on pyramid: 1
- Current champions: MBSJ FC (2 titles) (2026)
- Most championships: Selangor (3 titles)
- Broadcaster: Astro Arena
- Website: www.fam.org.my/lfk
- Current: 2026 National Women's Futsal Championship

The National Women's Futsal Championship, previously known as the Malaysia Premier Futsal League (Wanita) is the top flight women's futsal league in Malaysia. The league is managed by the Football Association of Malaysia (FAM). The competition has been founded in 2007.

== History ==
The Liga Futsal Kebangsaan (Wanita) has been founded when the women categories was introduced for the Liga Futsal Kebangsaan in 2007. For 2007 season, FELDA has become the official sponsor for the competition and the competition name has incorporated the sponsor name and called as Liga Futsal Kebangsaan FAM/FELDA and the partnership continue until the end of 2015 season.

Selangor, captained by the instrumental Shahila Yunus won back-to-back titles in the 2009-10 season and 2010-11 season.

The league has been resumed for a new season in February 2017 and competed among six clubs.

== Results ==
Season	Champions	Runners-up	Third place	Fourth place
National Futsal League
2007	(Malaysia) MAKSAK	(Malaysia) PDRM FA	Kelantan	(Malaysia) TV3
2008–09	(Malaysia) PDRM FA	Kuala Lumpur	(Kuala Lumpur) Figos RSA FC	Selangor
2009–10	Selangor	(Malaysia) PDRM FA	(Kuala Lumpur) Figos RSA FC	Kuala Lumpur
2010	Selangor	(Malaysia) PDRM FA	(Selangor) MPSJ FC	(Selangor) MBPJ FC
2011–12	(Selangor) PKNS FC	Selangor	(Kuala Lumpur) FELDA United	(Malaysia) PDRM FA
2013–14	(Selangor) MPSJ FC	(Kuala Lumpur) FELDA United	(Selangor) PKNS FC	Selangor
2014–15	Selangor	(Kuala Lumpur) FELDA United	Sabah	(Selangor) MPSJ FC
2017	(Kuala Lumpur) FELDA United	(Kuala Lumpur) KL Ally F.C.	Perak	(Malaysia) PDRM FA
2018	(Kuala Lumpur) FELDA United	(Selangor) MPSJ FC	Sabah	Perak
Malaysia Premier Futsal League (women)
2019	Kuala Lumpur	Selangor	Perak	Kedah
2020–2021	cancelled and declared null and void due to COVID-19 pandemic			
2022	(Malacca) Melaka	Selangor MBSJ	Sabah	(Kuala Lumpur) KL Prefer-Cyberlynx
2023–2025	Not held			
National Women's Futsal Championship
2026	(Selangor) MPSJ FC	(Selangor) Perdana BTR	(Selangor) UiTM Lioness	(Selangor) MBPJ FC

== Performance by clubs ==
Since its establishment, the National Women's Futsal Championship has been won by 8 different teams. Teams shown in italics no longer exist or no longer compete in the competition.

Club	Titles	Runners-up	Winning seasons	Years runners-up
Selangor	3	2	2009–10, 2010, 2014–15	2011–12, 2019
(Kuala Lumpur) FELDA United	2	2	2017, 2018	2013–14, 2014–15
(Selangor) MPSJ FC	2	1	2013–14, 2026	2018
(Malaysia) PDRM FA	1	3	2008–09	2007, 2009–10, 2010
Kuala Lumpur	1	1	2019	2008–09
(Malaysia) MAKSAK	1	0	2007	—N/a
(Selangor) PKNS FC	1	0	2011–12	—N/a
(Malacca) Melaka FA	1	0	2022	—N/a
(Kuala Lumpur) KL Ally F.C.	0	1	—N/a	2017
Selangor MBSJ	0	1	—N/a	2022
(Selangor) Perdana BTR F.C.	0	1	—N/a	2026

=== Final match results ===
Match

==== 2007 ====
12 August 2007	MAKSAK (Malaysia)	1 – 0	(Malaysia) PDRM FA	Stadium Malawati, Shah Alam
	Mariam Alias (pen.)

==== 2008–2009 ====
18 January 2009	PDRM FA (Malaysia)	4 – 3	Kuala Lumpur FA	Community Sports Complex, Felda Besout, Trolak
	Mas Mulsah 3', 30'; Noorwanis Ismail 15'; Angela Kais 16'		Norhaniza Mohamad 20'; Steffi Kaur 23', 27'

==== 2009–2010 ====
3 January 2010	Selangor FA	3 – 1	(Malaysia) PDRM FA	Panasonic Sports Complex, Shah Alam
	Nora Abu Dardak; Shahila Yunus; Rebecca Jane		Zaryatie Zakaria	Attendance: 3000

==== 2010 ====
28 November 2010	Selangor FA	2 – 1	(Malaysia) PDRM FA	Panasonic Sports Complex, Shah Alam
	Rina Jordana 4'; Noor Asyikin 30'		Rozana Roslan 5'	Attendance: 1000

==== 2011–2012 ====
11 March 2012	Selangor FA	0 – 1	(Selangor) PKNS FC	Stadium Putra, Bukit Jalil
			Hanis Farhana 10'	Attendance: 4000

== Awards ==
=== Prize money ===
The 2026 season, the distribution of the prize money is as follows.

- Winner: RM 8,000
- Runner-up: RM 5,000
- Third place: RM 3,000
- Top scorer: RM 500
- Best player: RM 500
- Best goal keeper: RM 500

=== Golden Boot winners ===
Season	Players	Teams/Clubs	Goals
2014–15	(Malaysia) Steffi Sarge Kaur	(Selangor) MPSJ FC	28
2013–14	(Malaysia) Farahiyah Ridzuan	(Kuala Lumpur) FELDA United FC	n/a
2011–12	(Malaysia) Angela Kais	(Malaysia) PDRM FA	n/a
2010	(Malaysia) Angela Kais	(Malaysia) PDRM FA	18
2009–10	(Malaysia) Angela Kais	(Malaysia) PDRM FA	11
2008–09	(Malaysia) Steffi Kaur	Kuala Lumpur FA	26
2007	(Malaysia) Nik Rosilawati	(Malaysia) MAKSAK	n/a
2026	(Malaysia) Fatin Shahida Azmi (Malaysia) Farahiyah Ridzuan	(Selangor) MPSJ FC (Selangor) MBPJ FC	9

=== Best player ===
Season	Players	Teams/Clubs
2011–12	(Malaysia) Hanis Farhana	(Selangor) PKNS FC
2010	(Malaysia) Nurul Aishah	Selangor FA
2009-10	(Malaysia) Shahila Yunus	Selangor FA
2007	(Malaysia) Nurul Aishah	Kelantan FA
2026	(Malaysia) Nur Lyana	(Selangor) Perdana BTR

=== Best goalkeeper ===
Season	Players	Teams/Clubs
2011–12	(Malaysia) Anies Maizura	Selangor FA
2007	(Malaysia) Nur Shafiqah	Kelantan FA
2026	(Malaysia) Noorasyeimah Rashid	(Selangor) MPSJ FC

=== Best Young player ===
Season	Players	Teams/Clubs
2011-12	(Malaysia) Hanis Farhana	(Selangor) PKNS FC

== See also ==
- Malaysia national men's futsal team
- Malaysia women's national futsal team
