= National League =

National League often refers to:

- National League (baseball), one of the two baseball leagues constituting Major League Baseball in the United States and Canada
- National League (division), the fifth division of the English football (soccer) system
- National League (ice hockey), the top tier of the Swiss ice hockey league system

National League may also refer to:

== Organizations ==
=== Political parties ===
- Australasian National League, anti-Labor alliance founded 1896
- Indian National League, formed in 1994 and currently part of the Left Democratic Front
- Irish National League, founded by Charles Parnell in 1882 and dissolved in 1900
- National League (Poland, 1893) (Liga Narodowa), a Polish right-wing political organisation that disbanded in 1928
- National League (Poland, 2007) (Liga Narodowa), a Polish far-right minor political party
- National League Party of Ireland, founded by William Redmond and Thomas O'Donnell in 1926 and disbanded in 1931
- National League for Democracy, a liberal democratic political party in Myanmar (Burma) founded in 1988
- National League for Democracy (Tanzania), formed in 1993
- National League of the North, an Irish nationalist organisation active in Northern Ireland, active 1928–1938
- National League of Sweden, a political party initially formed in 1915 as the National Youth League of Sweden

=== Other groups ===
- National League of Cities, an American advocacy organization formed in 1924
- National League for the Defense of Religious Liberty, a Mexican civil rights organization active during the 1920s
- National League for Liberty in Vaccination, a French organization formed in 1954
- National League for Nursing, an American organization formed in 1893
- National League for Opposing Woman Suffrage, a London-based organization active from 1910 to 1918
- National League for Women's Service, an American civilian volunteer organization active during World War I
- National League of Young Liberals, the youth wing of the British Liberal Party, active during most of the 20th century

== Sports ==
=== Association football (soccer) ===
- Bhutan National League, the premier football competition in Bhutan
- Gibraltar National League, now known as Gibraltar Football League, the premier football competition in Gibraltar
- Myanmar National League, the premier football league in Myanmar
- National League System, a component of the English football league system
  - National League (English football), a league covering the fifth and sixth tiers of English football
  - National League North and National League South, divisions in the second-level of the National League System
- National League (Turkey), a defunct football league in Turkey
- New Zealand National League, the top division of the New Zealand football system
- Russian Football National League, the second division of the Russian football system
- FAI National League, soccer league in Ireland

=== Ice hockey ===
- National League B, former name of the Swiss League, the second tier of the Swiss ice hockey league system

=== Motorcycle speedway ===
- National League (speedway), the third tier of speedway in the United Kingdom which replaced the Conference League in 2009
- National League, a former name (1976–1990) of the second tier of British speedway, now known as British League Division Two
- National League (1932–1964), the top speedway league in Britain in the mid-20th century

=== Rugby ===
- National League 1, the third of three national leagues in the domestic rugby union competition of England
- National League 2 North and National League 2 South, semi-professional level-four leagues in the English rugby union system
- National League 3 Midlands, National League 3 North, National League 3 London & SE and National League 3 South-West, semi-professional level-five leagues in the English rugby union system
- National Leagues, former name (2003–2008) of the Rugby League Championships in the United Kingdom

=== Other sports ===
- National League (cricket), a former cricket league in England and Wales
- National League (netball), the top level of netball in Scotland

== See also ==
- National Basketball League (disambiguation)
- National Football League (disambiguation)
- National Ice Hockey League (disambiguation)
- National Soccer League (disambiguation)
- National Women's League (disambiguation)
- Women's National League (disambiguation)
- National Division (disambiguation)
