= Cadarian Raines =

American basketball player (born 1990)

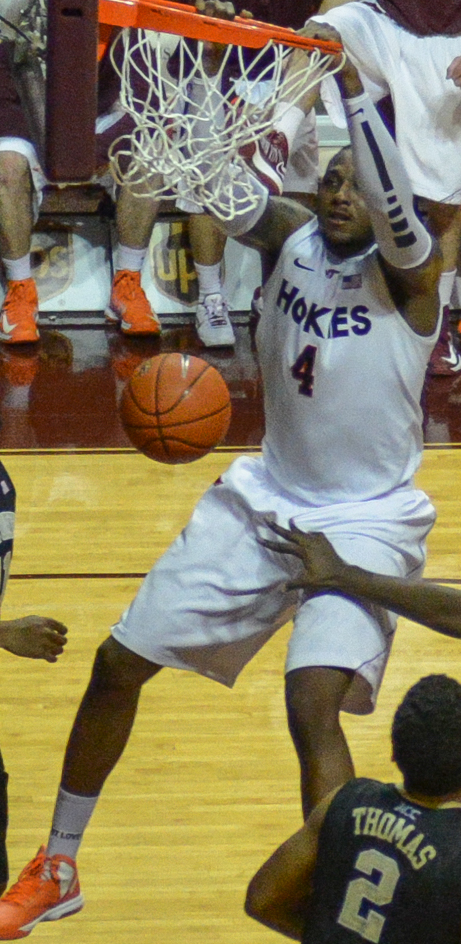
- Raines dunking for Virginia Tech in January 2013

No. 44 – Levski Sofia
- Position: Power forward / center
- League: National Basketball League

Personal information
- Born: October 12, 1990 (age 36) Petersburg, Virginia, U.S.
- Listed height: 6 ft 9 in (2.06 m)
- Listed weight: 237.6 lb (108 kg)

Career information
- High school: Petersburg (Petersburg, Virginia)
- College: Virginia Tech (2009–2014)
- NBA draft: 2014: undrafted
- Playing career: 2014–present

Career history
- 2014: Villa Angela
- 2015: Mono Vampire
- 2015: Al Arabi
- 2016: IRT Tanger
- 2016–2017: Apollon Limassol
- 2017: Apollon Patras
- 2017: Sagesse
- 2017–2018: USK Praha
- 2018–2019: Enosis Neon Paralimni
- 2019: Knox Raiders
- 2019–2020: Tallinna Kalev
- 2020–2022: Beroe
- 2022–2023: Trepça
- 2023–2024: Beroe
- 2024–2025: Panteras de Miranda
- 2025-present: BC Levski Sofia

Career highlights
- 2x Cypriot League All-Star (2017, 2018); Thailand League champion (2015)

Cadarian Raines (born October 12, 1990) is an American professional basketball player for BC Levski of the National Basketball League (Bulgaria). Standing at 2.06 m (6 ft 9 in), he plays the power forward and the center positions. After playing four years of college basketball at Virginia Tech, Raines entered the 2014 NBA draft, but he was not selected in the draft's two rounds.

== High school career ==
Raines played high school basketball at Petersburg High School, where he was coached by Bill Lawson. Raines led the Crimson Wave to a 30–1 record and a 14–0 in district action. As a senior, he averaged 15.6 points, 9.8 rebounds, 3.8 blocks and 1.6 assists per game. He also earned First-team All-State and first team All-Metro as a senior and was the MVP of the Fort Lee Tournament

== Professional career ==
After going undrafted in the 2014 NBA draft, Raines joined Villa Angela of the Argentine second division. He left the club until December 31, 2014, after averaging 8.8 points and 6.5 rebounds per game. He then joined Mono Vampire at Thailand. With Mono Vampire, he won the Thailand League.

The following season, Raines joined Al-Arabi of the Qatari Basketball League. Due to his poor performances, he was released from the Qatari team on November. On February 23, 2016, he signed with IRT Tanger of the Moroccan League until the end of the season.

On November 12, 2016, Raines signed with Apollon Limassol of the Cypriot League. With Apollon, Raines played at the Cypriot League All-Star Games of both 2017 and 2018.

On January 24, 2017, Raines signed with Apollon Patras of the Greek Basket League, replacing Michael Cobbins on the team's squad. On April 14, 2017, Raines signed with the Lebanese team Club Sagesse.

Raines has since played for USK Praha of the NBL among other teams.

On November 7, 2025, Cedarian Reins joined Levski, becoming an important member of the team. During the 2025–26 season, he averaged 11.3 points, 6.0 rebounds, and 2.3 assists per game.
