= NIHL =

NIHL may refer to:

- Noise-induced hearing loss
- National Ice Hockey League (disambiguation)
