= Women's National League =

Women's National League may refer to:

== Sports ==
=== Basketball ===
- Scottish Women's National League, a major basketball league in Scotland
- Women's National Basketball League, a major basketball league in Australia

=== Cricket ===
- Women's National Cricket League, the national competition for women's cricket in Australia

=== Association football (soccer) ===
- Chinese Women's National League, the premier women's football competition in China
- Women's National League (Bhutan), the premier women's football competition in Bhutan
- Women's National League (England), the third-tier women's football competition in England
- Women's National League (Ireland), the premier women's football competition in the Republic of Ireland
- National Women's Soccer League, the premier women's soccer competition in the United States
- Women's National League (Vietnam), the premier women's football competition in Vietnam
- Women's National League (South Sudan), the premier women's football competition in South Sudan

=== Futsal ===
- Women's National Futsal League Malaysia, the premier women's futsal competition in Malaysia

== Politics ==
- Australian Women's National League, Australian women's lobby group founded in 1904
- Women's Loyal National League, American women's anti-slavery group founded 1863

== See also ==
- National Women's League (disambiguation)
- National League (disambiguation)
