= National Division =

National Division may refer to:

- Luxembourg National Division
- Luxembourg National Division (men's handball)
- Luxembourg National Division (women's handball)
- Moldovan Super Liga
- Moldovan Handball National Division
- Moldovan National Division (basketball)
- Turkish National Division
- Divisione Nazionale

== See also ==
- Division (disambiguation)
- Multi-National Division (disambiguation)
- National League (disambiguation)
- Political polarization
