= Petaling Jaya Stadium =

Sports venue in Petaling Jaya, Malaysia

Majlis Bandaraya Petaling Jaya Stadium Stadium Majlis Bandaraya Petaling Jaya ستاديوم مجليس بندارايا ڤتاليڠ جاي
- Interactive map of Majlis Bandaraya Petaling Jaya Stadium; Stadium Majlis Bandaraya Petaling Jaya ستاديوم مجليس بندارايا ڤتاليڠ جاي
- Address: Jalan Stadium 7/15, Ss 7, 47301 Petaling Jaya
- Location: Petaling Jaya, Selangor, Malaysia
- Coordinates: 3°05′55″N 101°35′38″E
- Owner: Petaling Jaya City Council
- Operator: Petaling Jaya City Council
- Capacity: 10,661
- Surface: Grass pitch, track and field
- Scoreboard: Digital
- Public transit: KJ27 SA07 Glenmarie LRT station; KJ24 Kelana Jaya LRT station; T774 T781 Rapid Bus

Construction
- Opened: 1996; 30 years ago
- Renovated: 2004, 2024
- Reopened: 26 April 2024; 2 years ago

Tenants
- TM F.C. (2006–2007); MPPJ Selangor (1996–2006); PKNS (2004–2015); Petaling Jaya Rangers (2011–2019); Petaling Jaya City (2014–2022); Selangor (2020–present); FAS Women's Super League (2021–present)

The Petaling Jaya Stadium, also known as the MBPJ Stadium, is a multi-purpose stadium in the suburb of Kelana Jaya in Petaling Jaya, Selangor, Malaysia. The stadium was opened in 1996 and had a capacity of 25,000. It was built in time for the 1998 Commonwealth Games and hosted the rugby union competition. The stadium is mostly used for football matches.

== History ==
Petaling Jaya Stadium was opened in 1996 and has a capacity of 25,000. It was built in time for the 1998 Commonwealth Games and hosted the Games' rugby union matches. The stadium previously served as the home to MPPJ FC, the first club in Malaysian football competition to win the Malaysia Cup until its quietus in August 2006.

It was called MPPJ Stadium and MBPJ Stadium, after Petaling Jaya was granted a city status. Later on, it has been known as Petaling Jaya Stadium. In 2011, the stadium was used as the start and finish line of the Petaling Jaya Half-Marathon. In 2013, popular show Asia's Next Top Model filmed its Cycle 2 Episode 4 at the MBPJ Stadium. In February 2014, the stadium was used for the Sasuke Asean Open Cup 2014.

In December 2016, PJ Rangers announced to adopt the stadium as their home ground for the 2017 season. The city council has approved PJ Rangers and MISC-MIFA of stadium tenancy for 2017 season. The stadium was used for the 2018 AFC U-16 Championship. In early 2020, regarding the closure of Shah Alam Stadium, it became the home of the Malaysia Super League club Selangor. Following RM8 million repair and renovation works for Selangor's future participation in 2024–25 AFC Champions League Two, the stadium became all seated and the capacity reduced.

== International football matches ==
Date	Competition	Team 1	Res.	Team 2
15 October 2008	2008 Merdeka Tournament	Malaysia	4–0	Nepal
17 October 2008	2008 Merdeka Tournament	Malaysia	4–0	Sierra Leone
29 November 2008	Friendly	Malaysia	2–2	Singapore

== Gallery ==
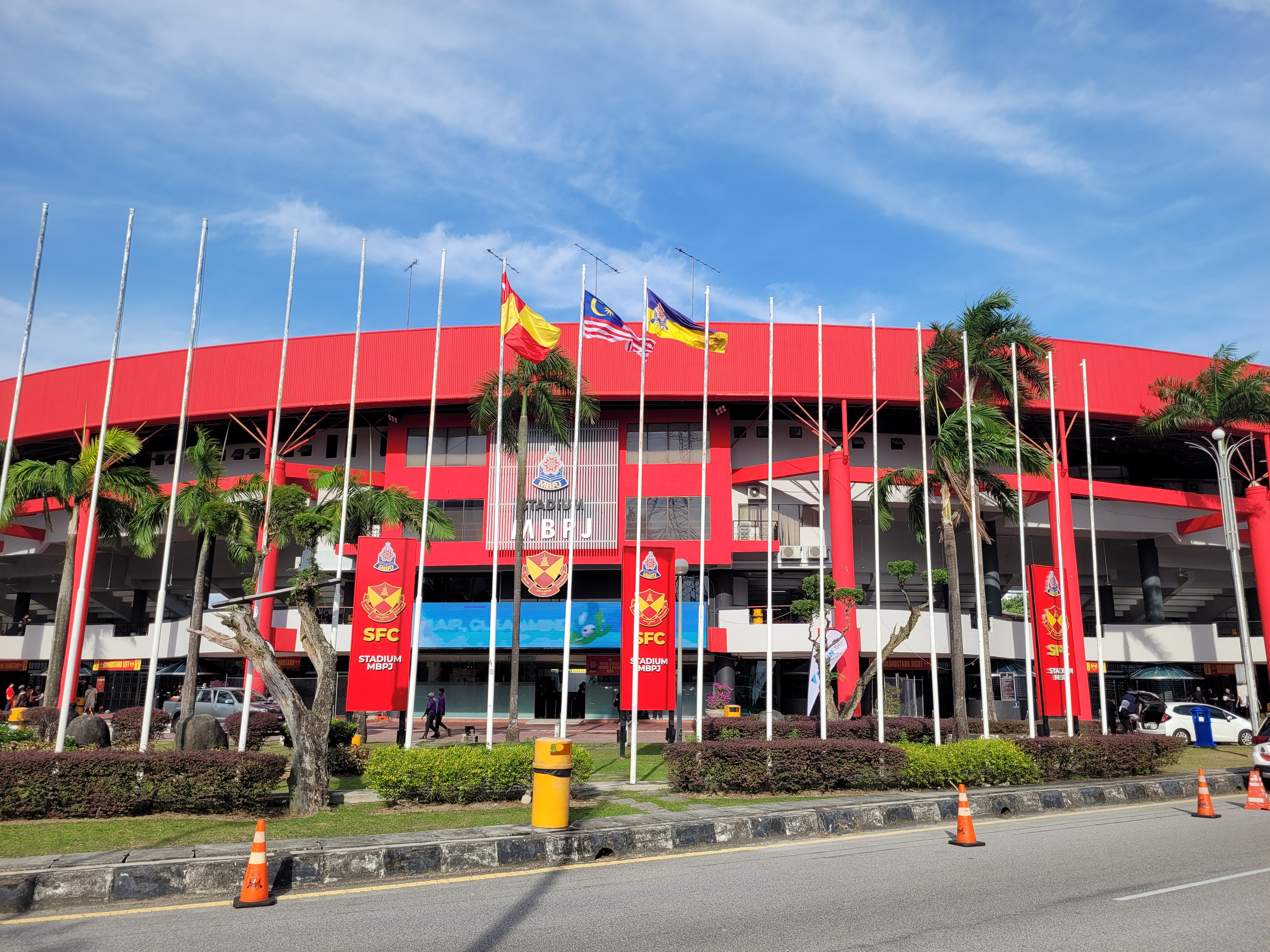
Main entrance (2024)

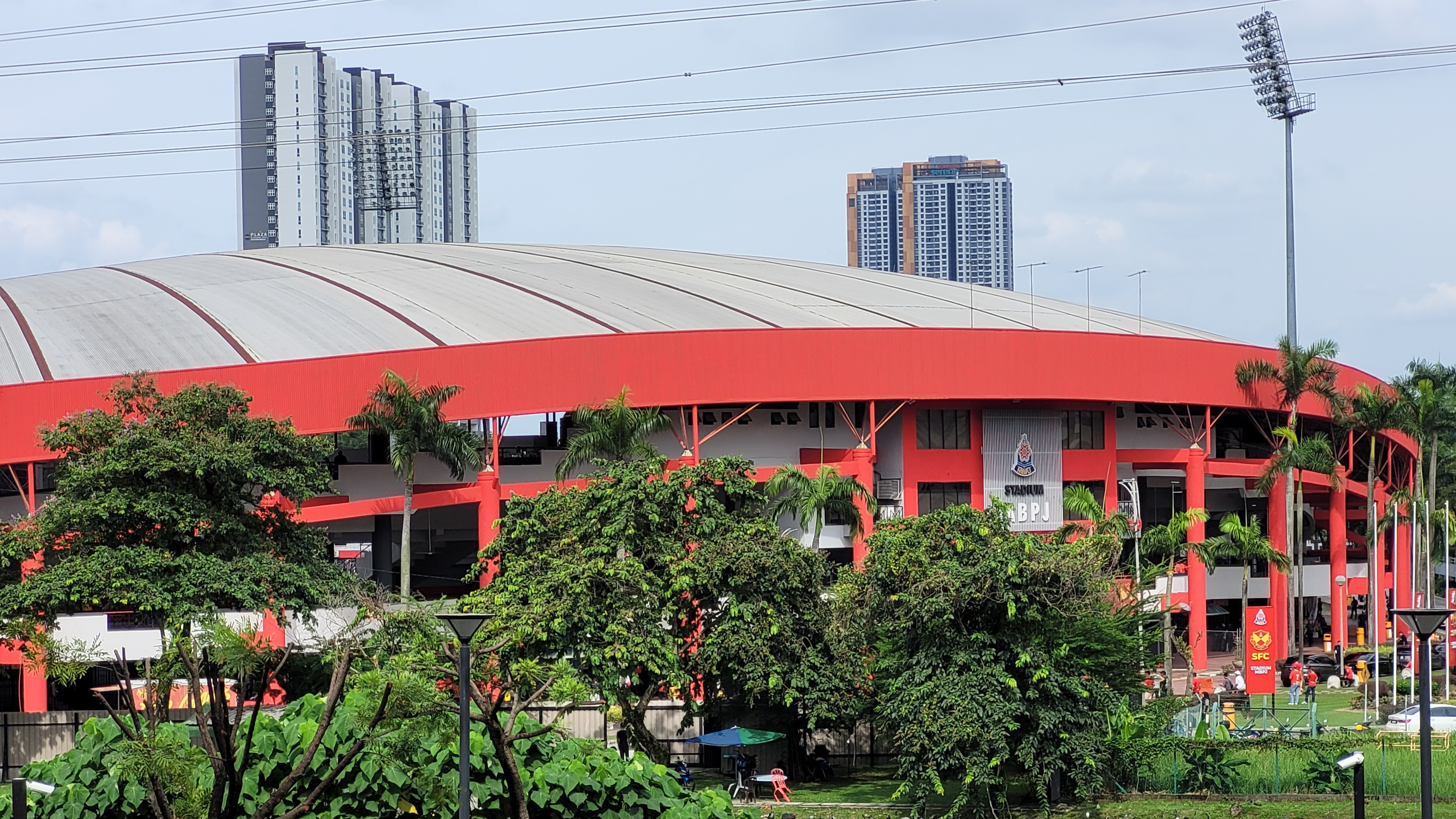
Front view (2024)

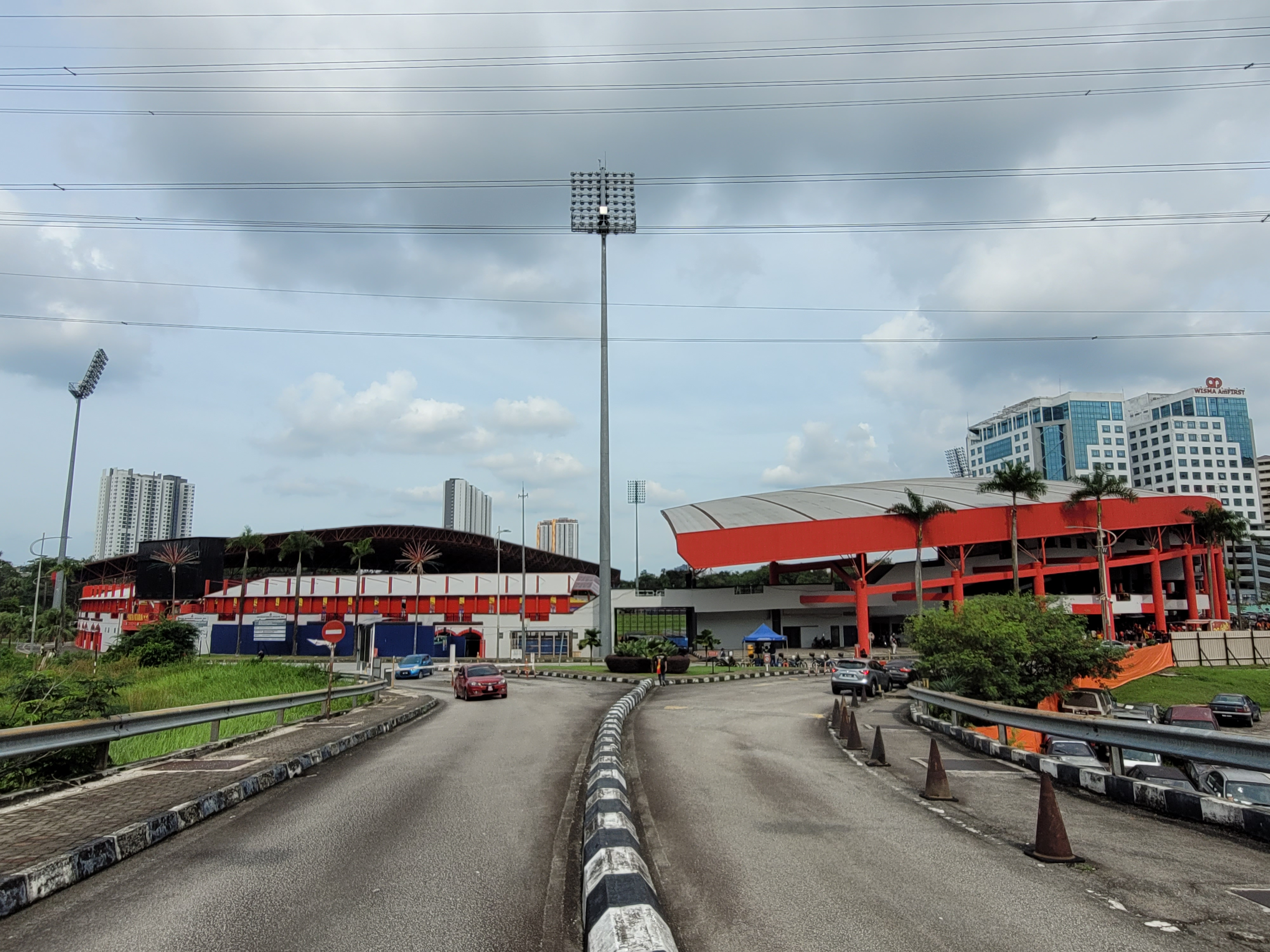
Side view (2024)

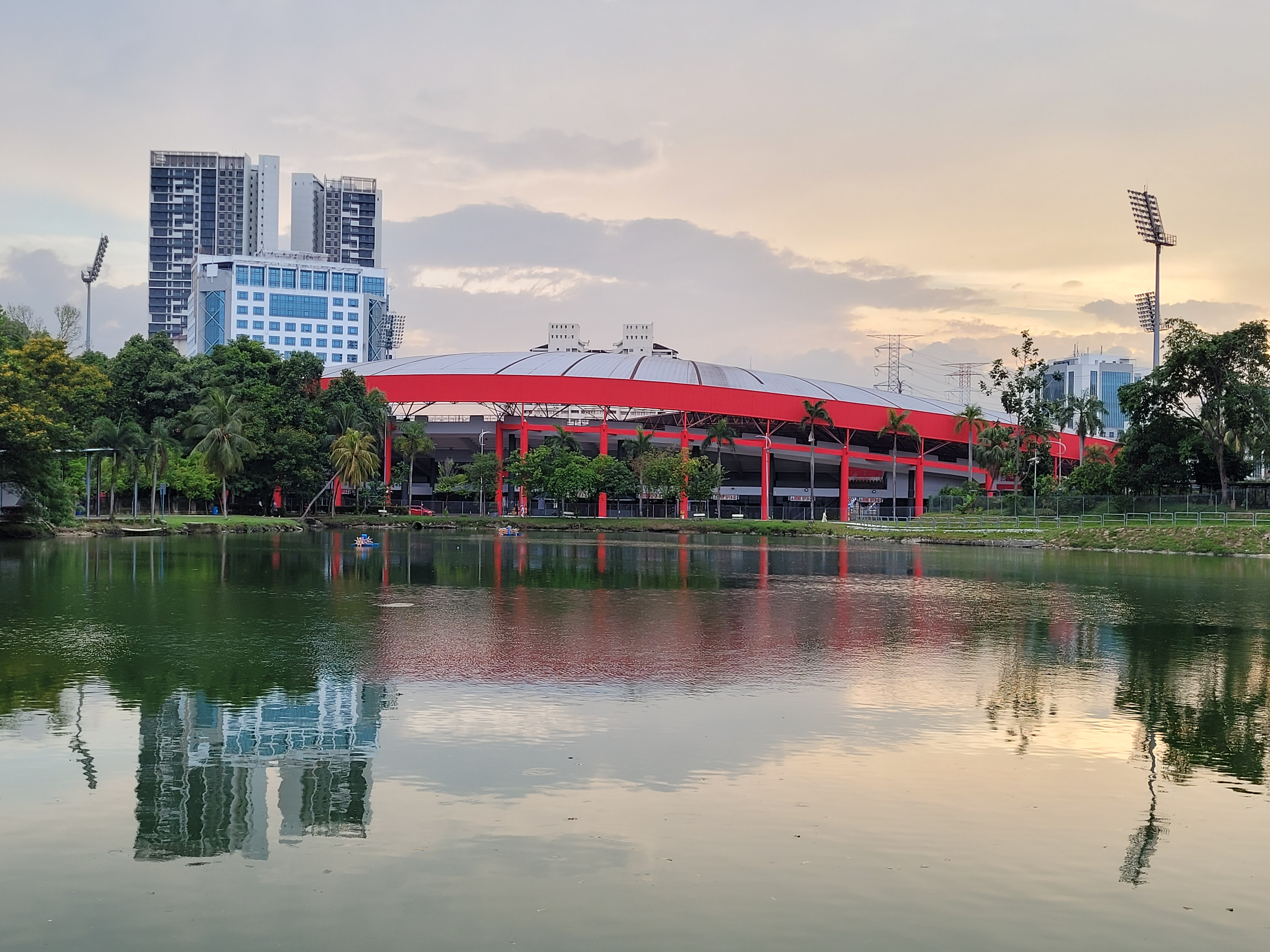
Lake view (2024)

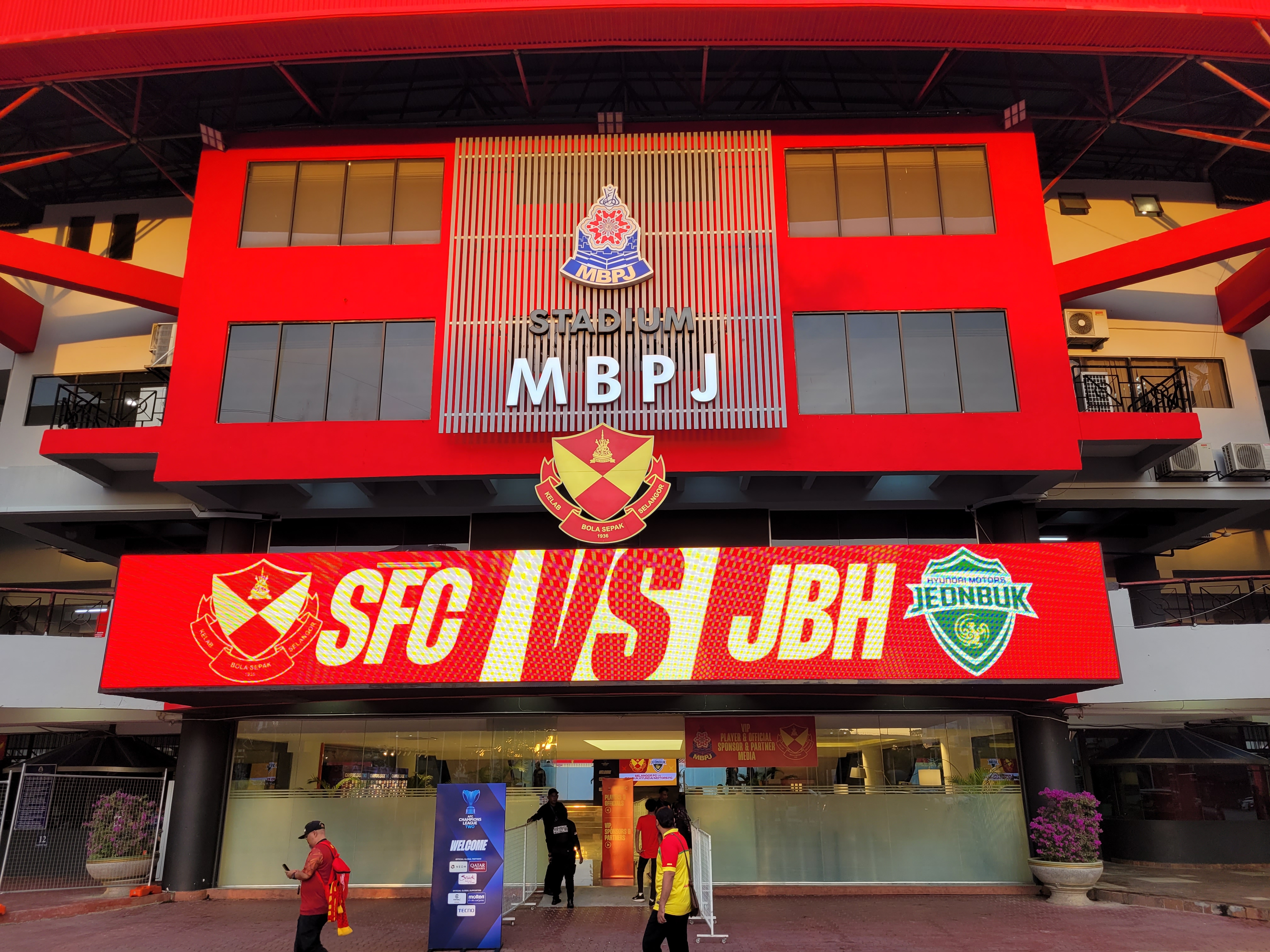
Main entrance (2024)

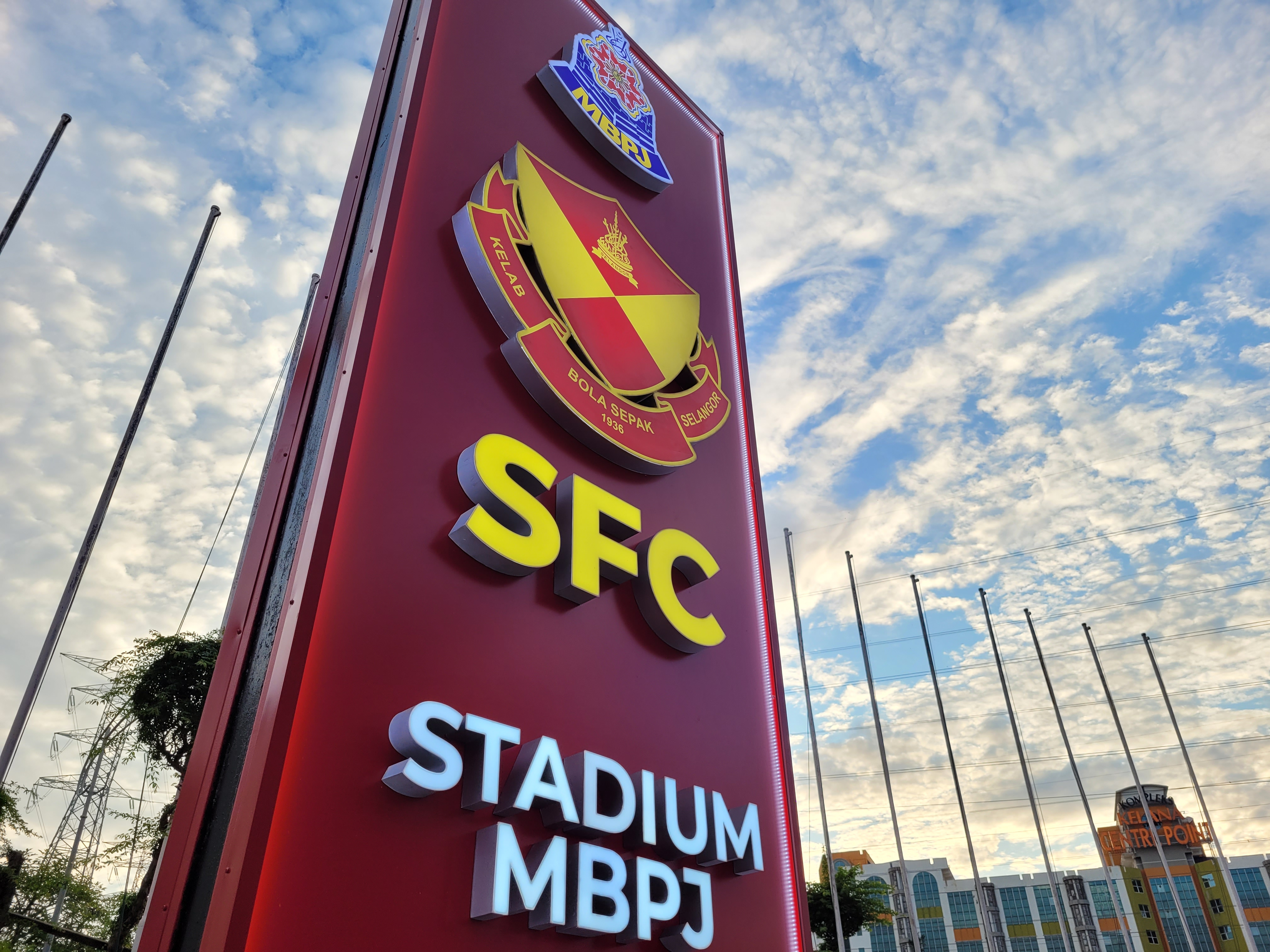
Selangor FC signage (2024)

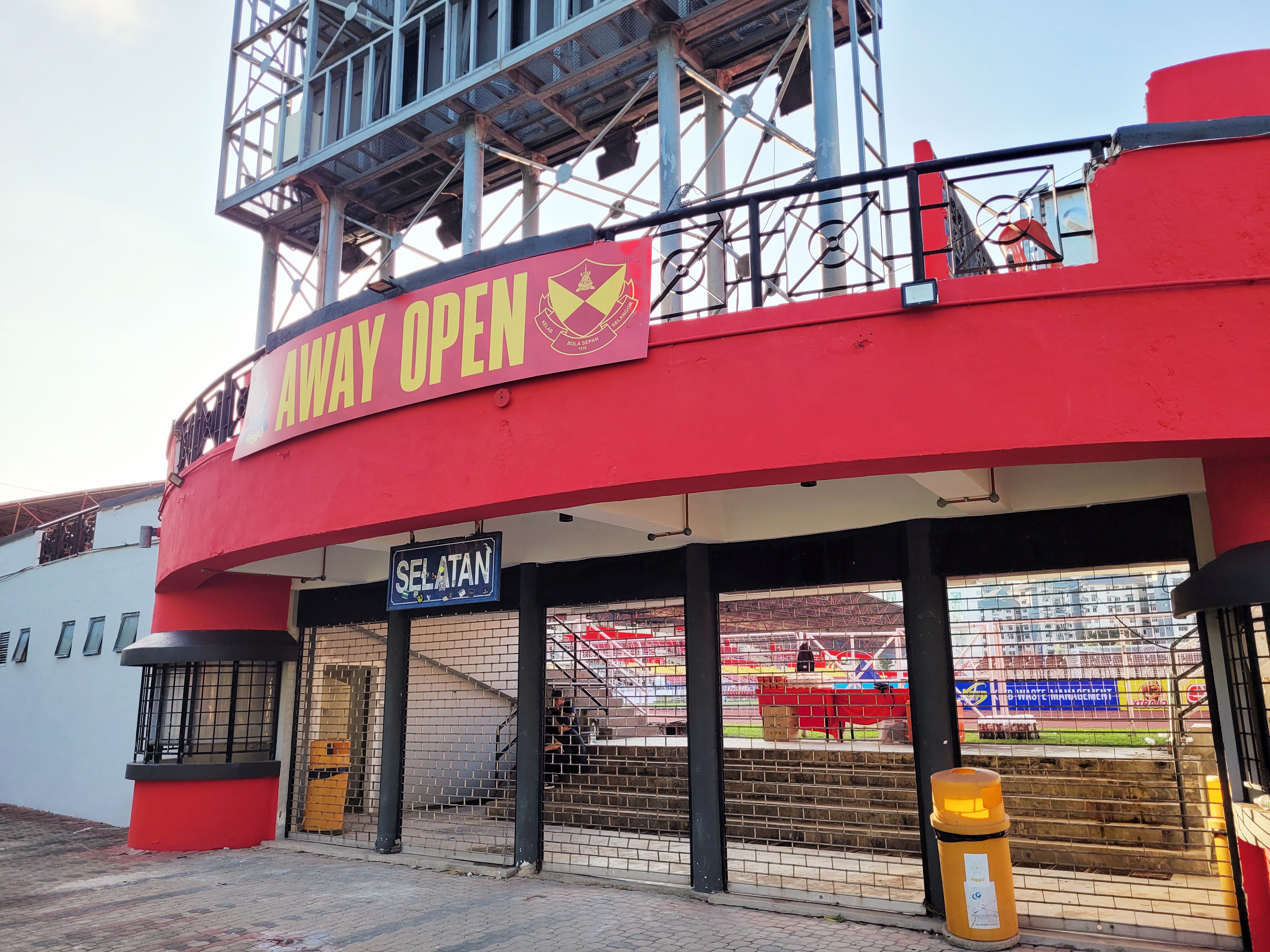
Away Open entrance (2024)

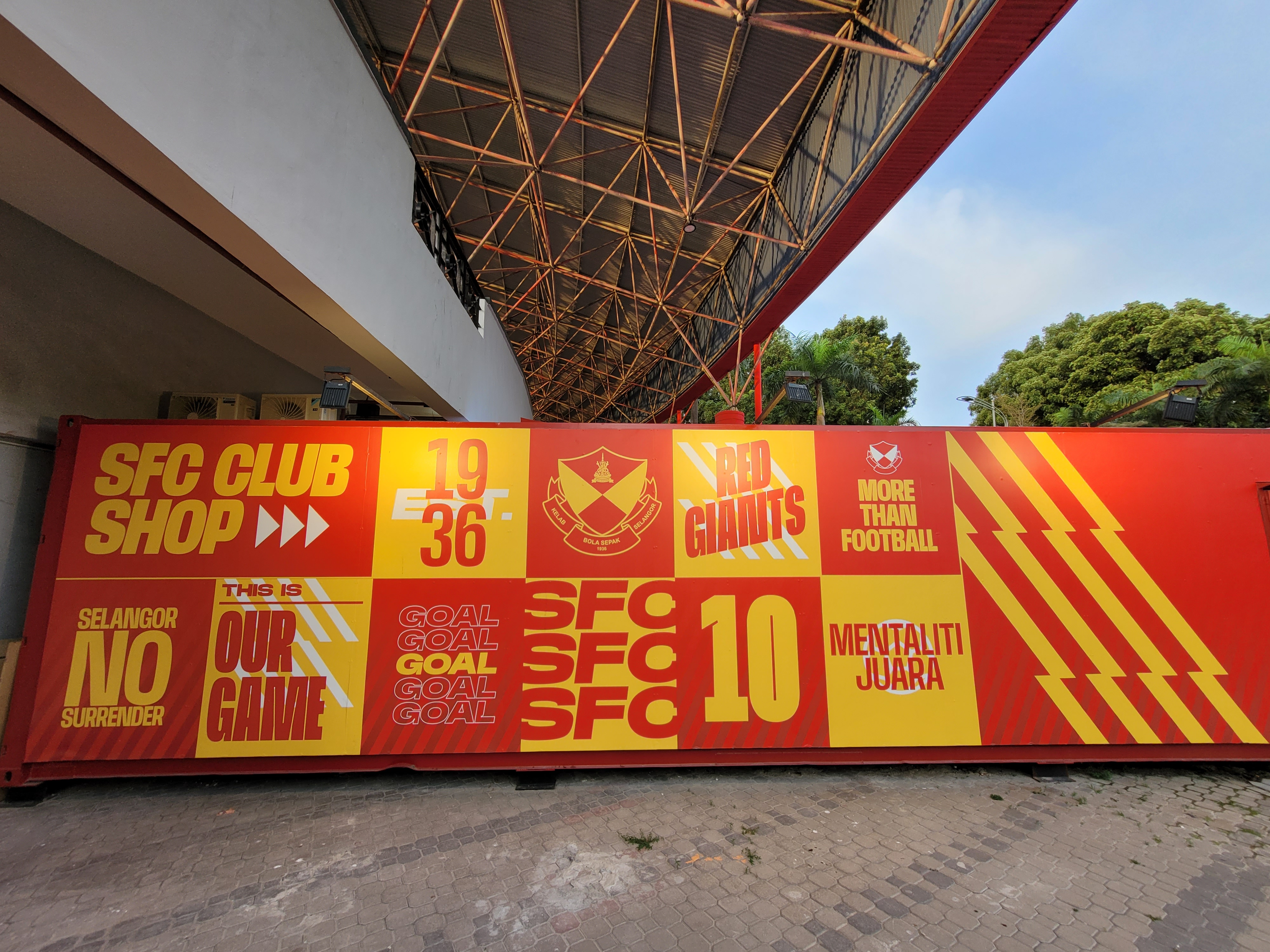
SFC Club Shop (2024)

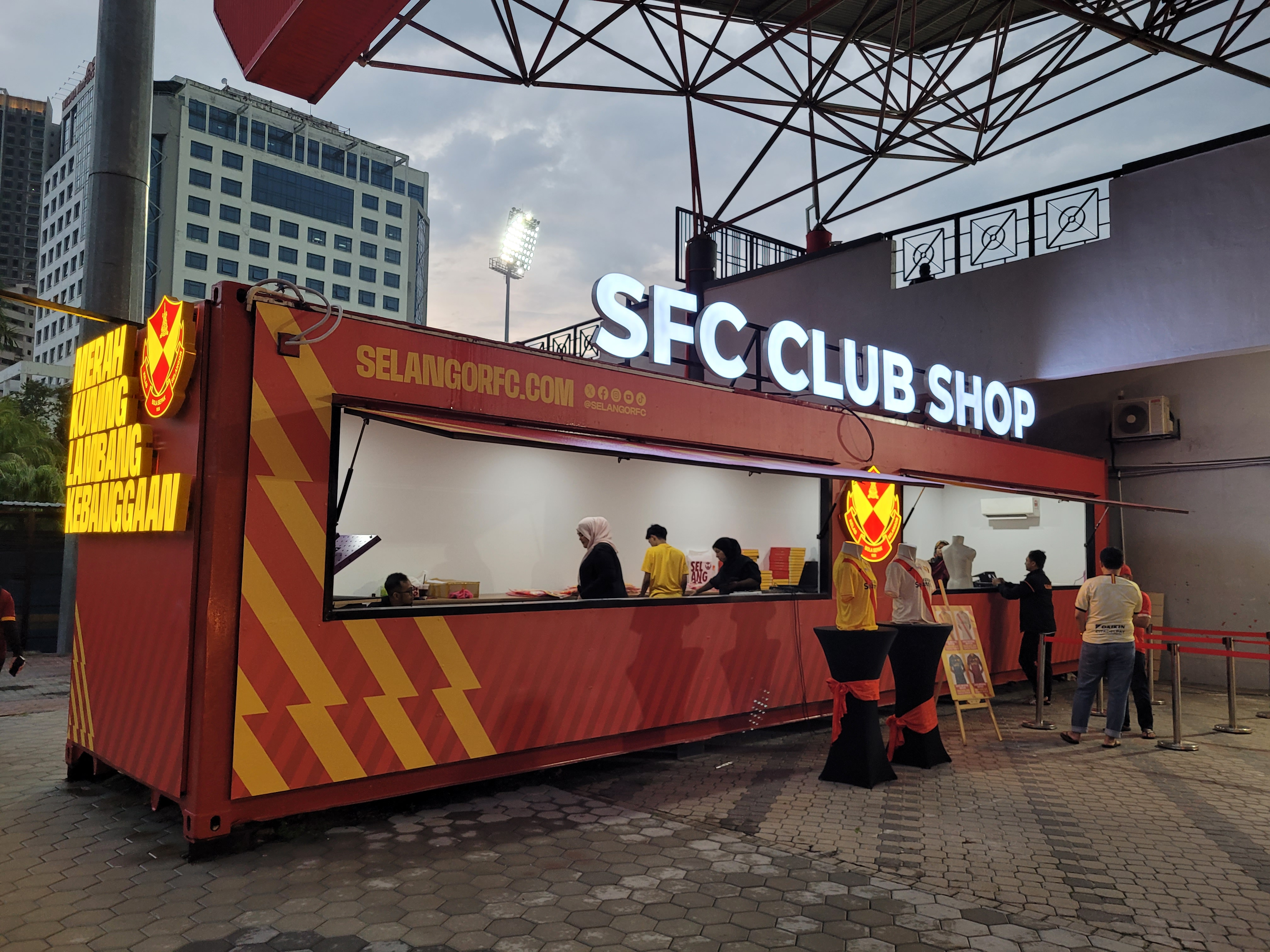
SFC Club Shop (2024)

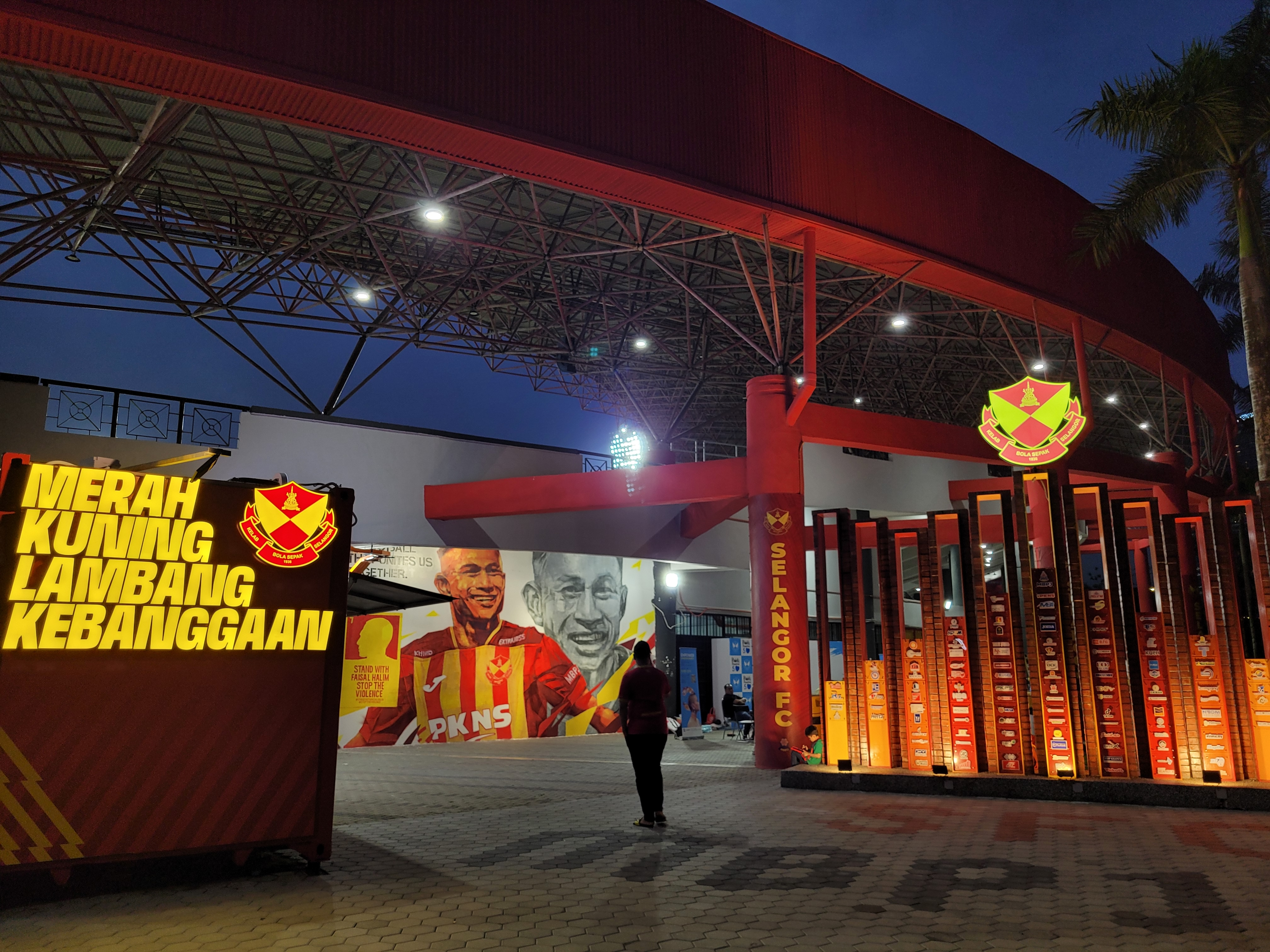
Home Open section (2024)

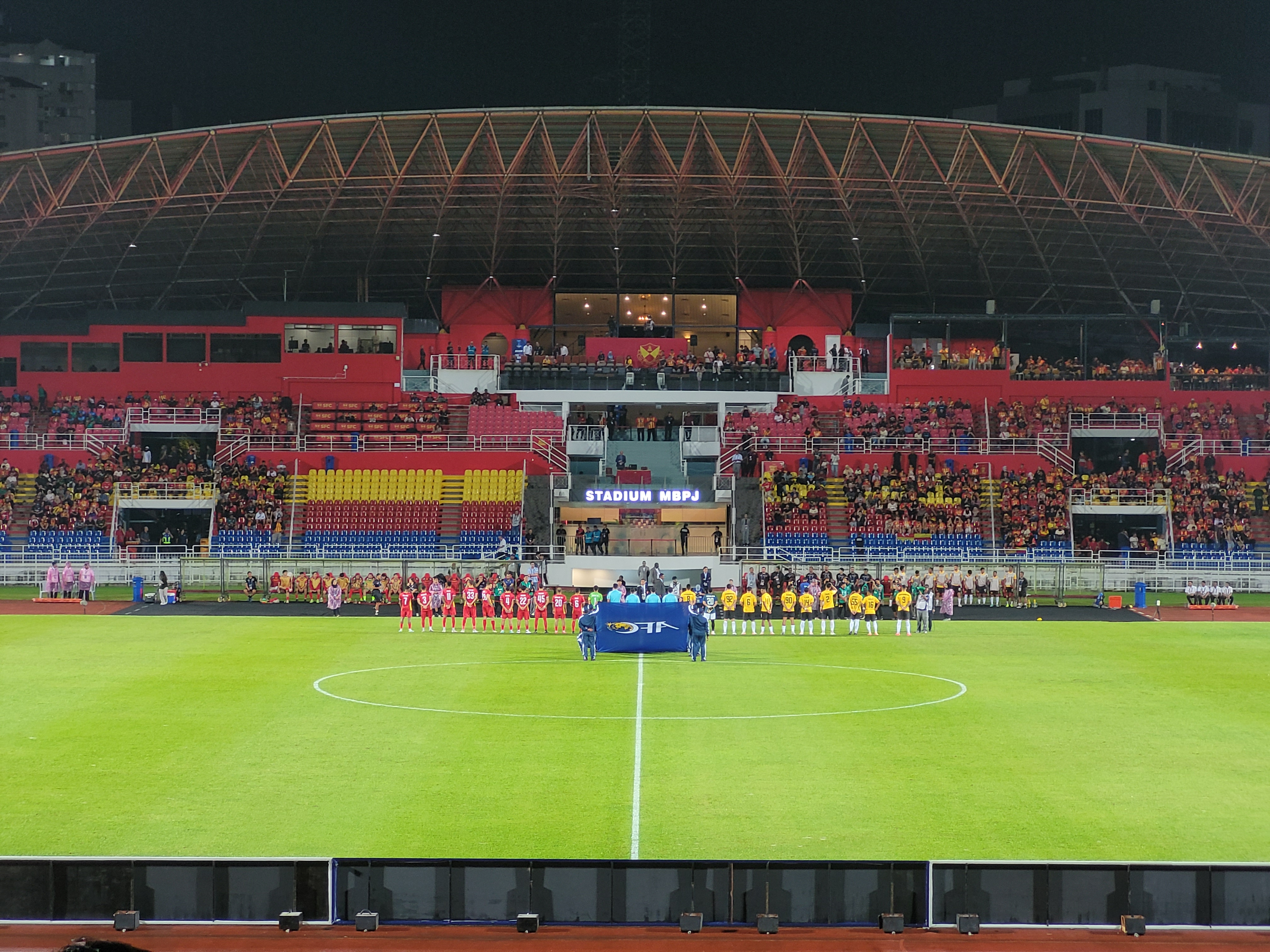
Grandstand (2024)

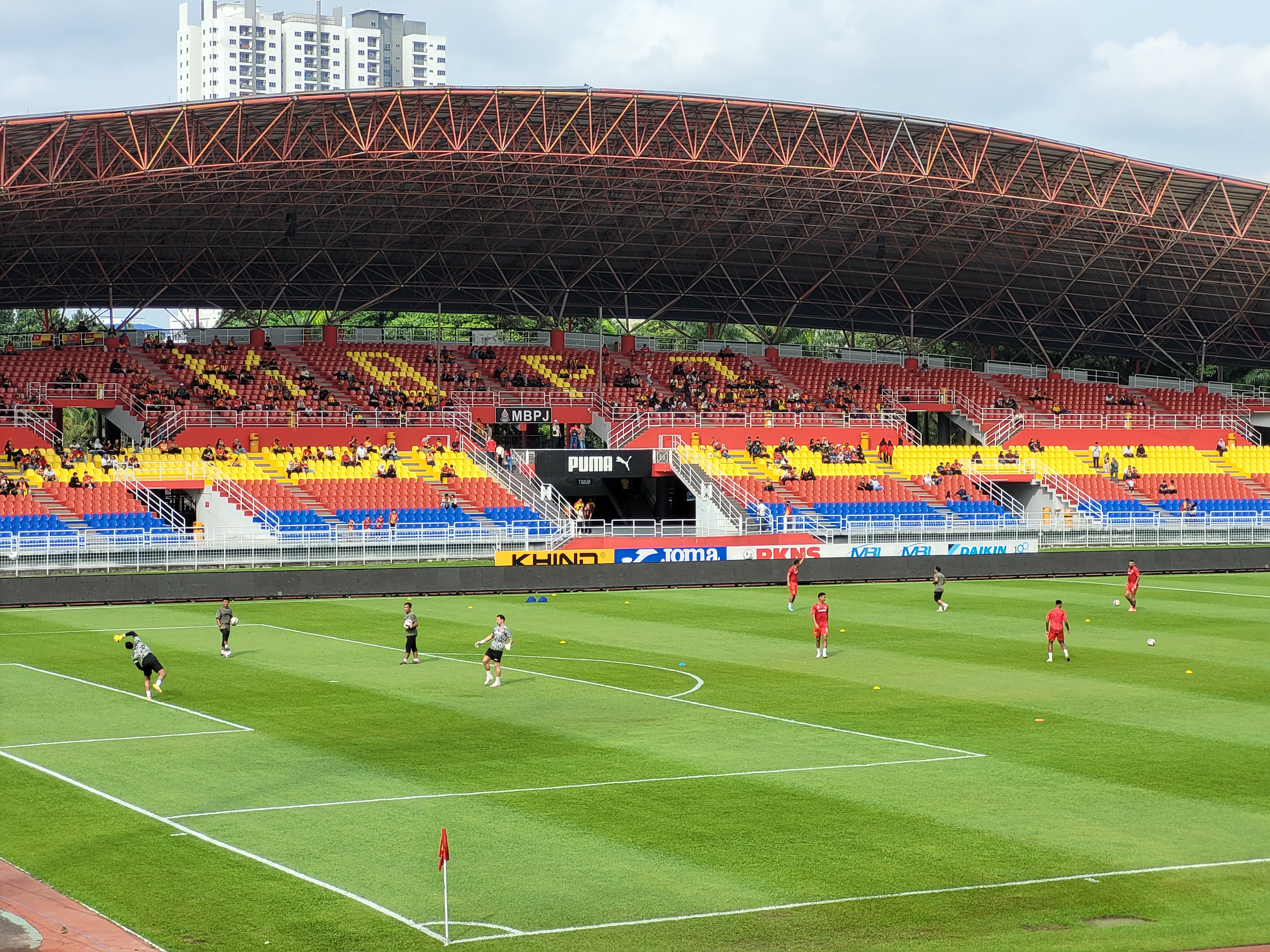
Home Open stand (2024)

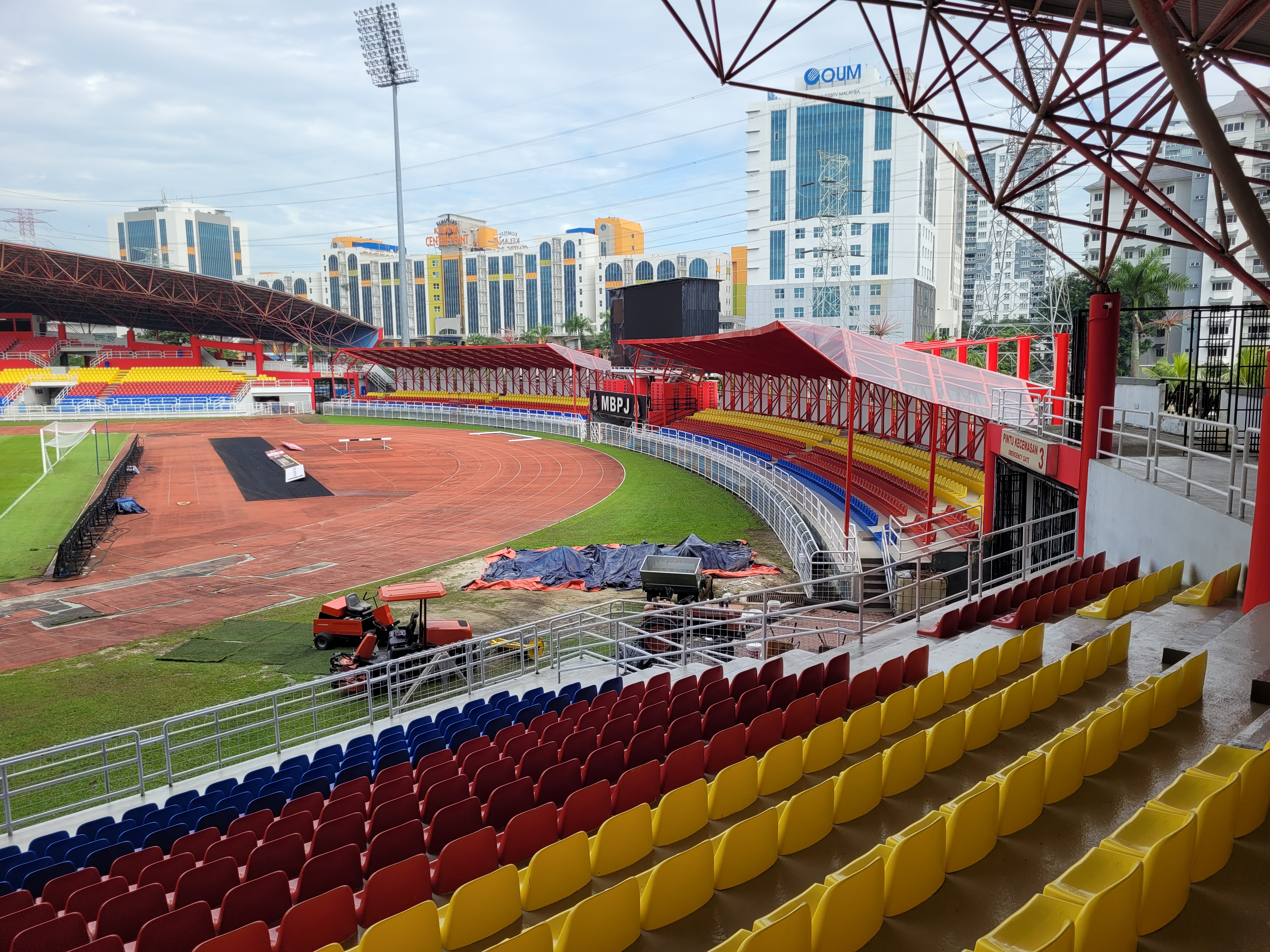
View of North stand, from Home Open stand (2024)

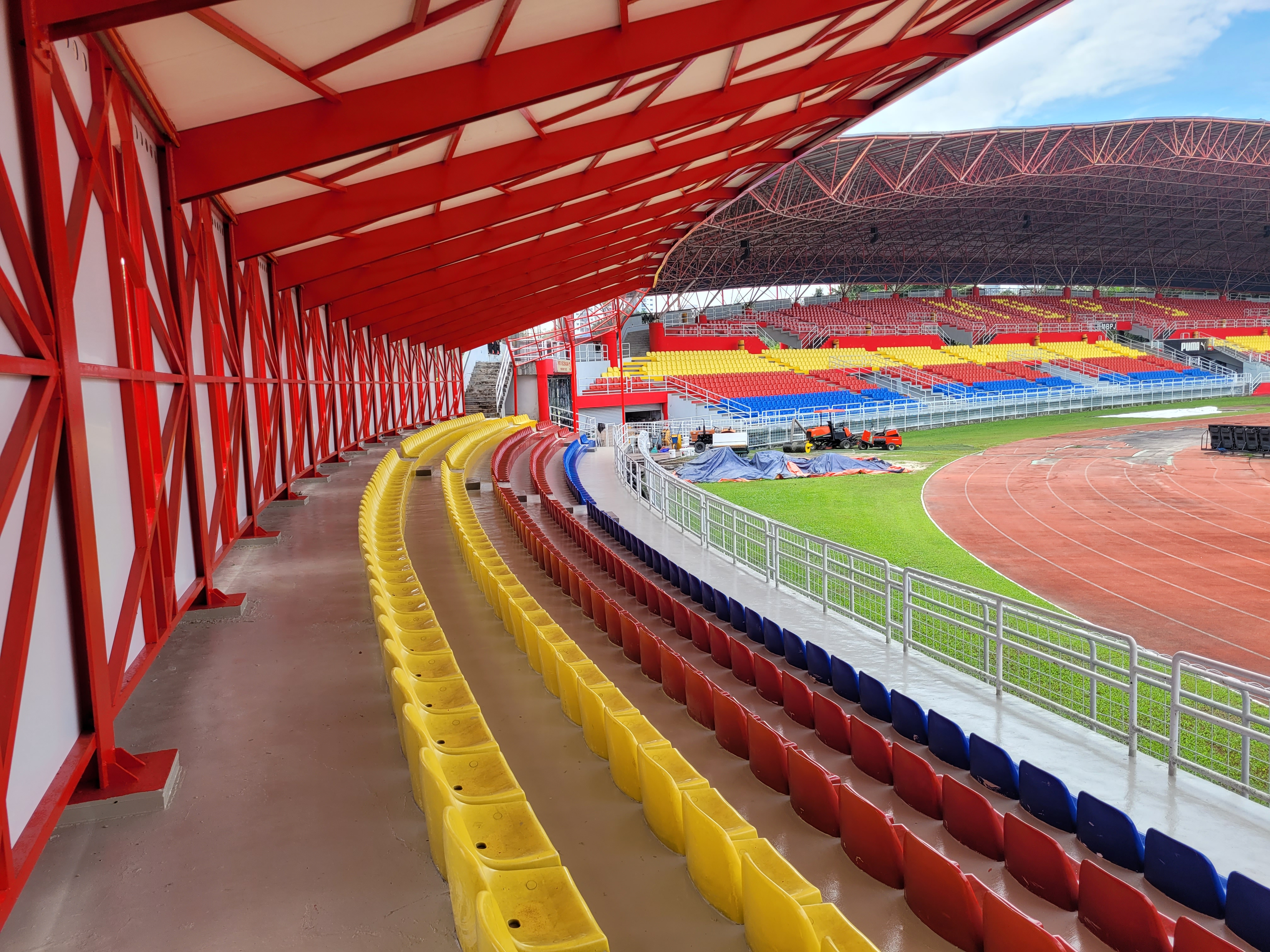
North stand (2024)

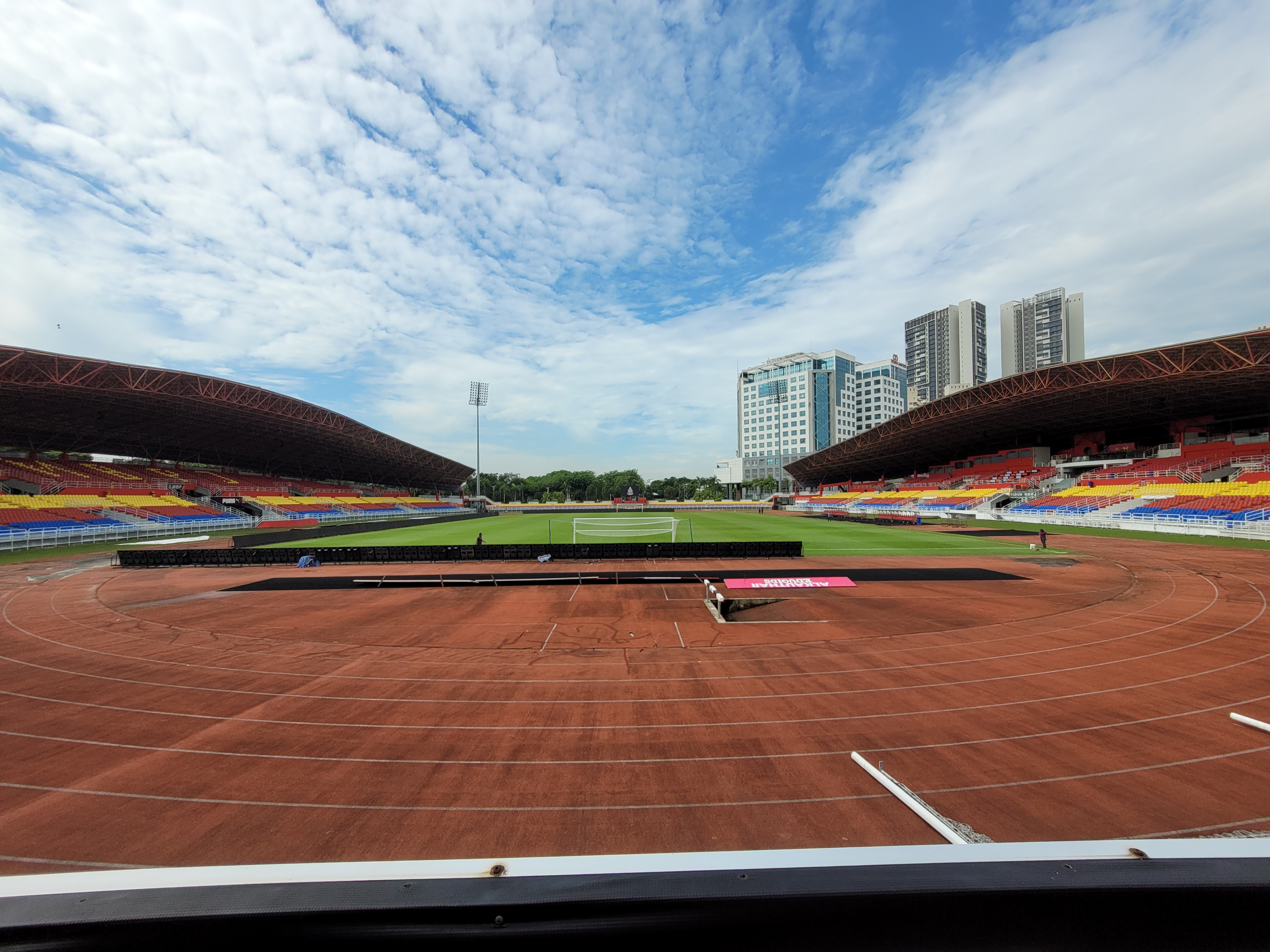
View from North stand (2024)

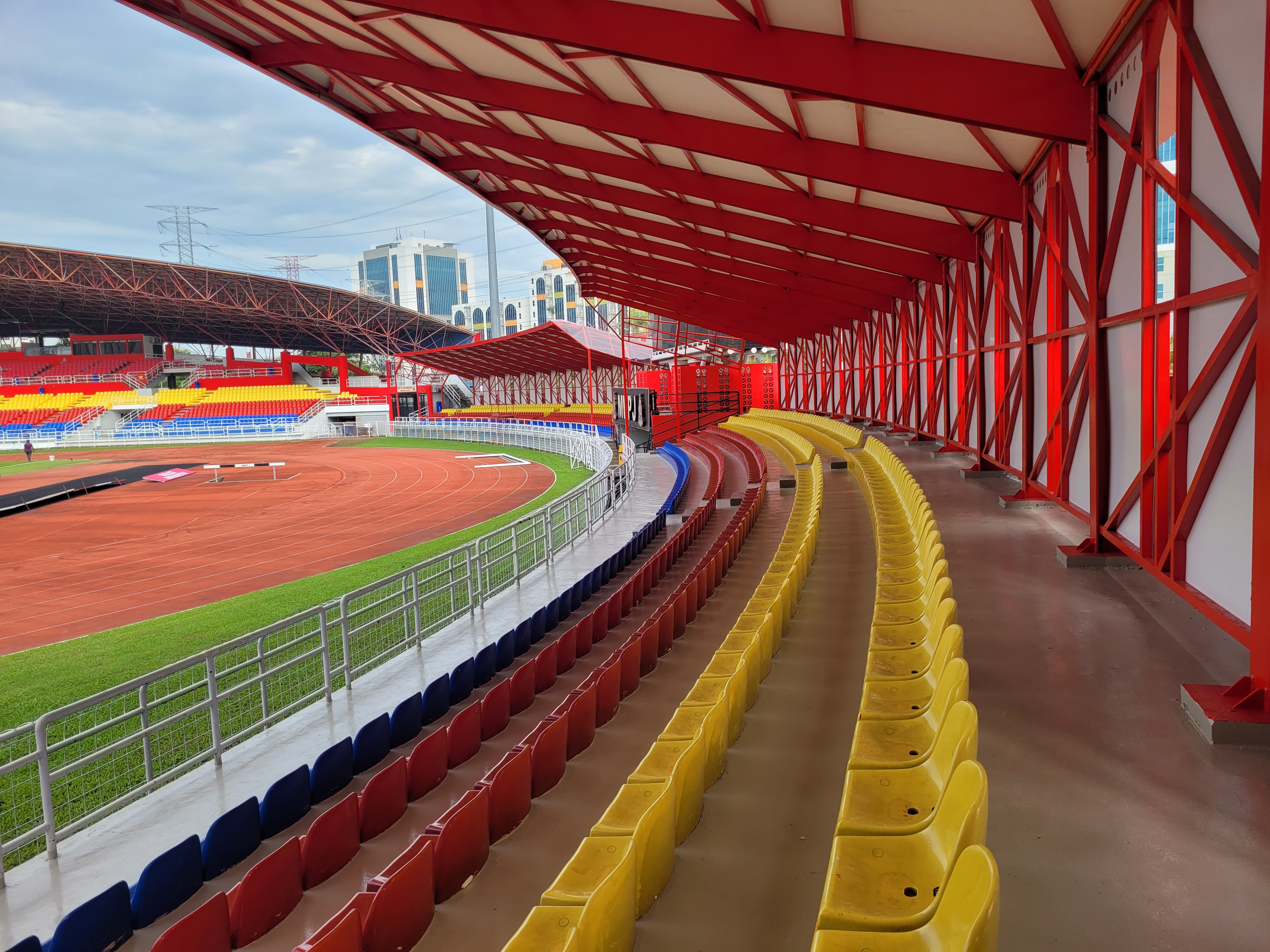
North stand (2024)

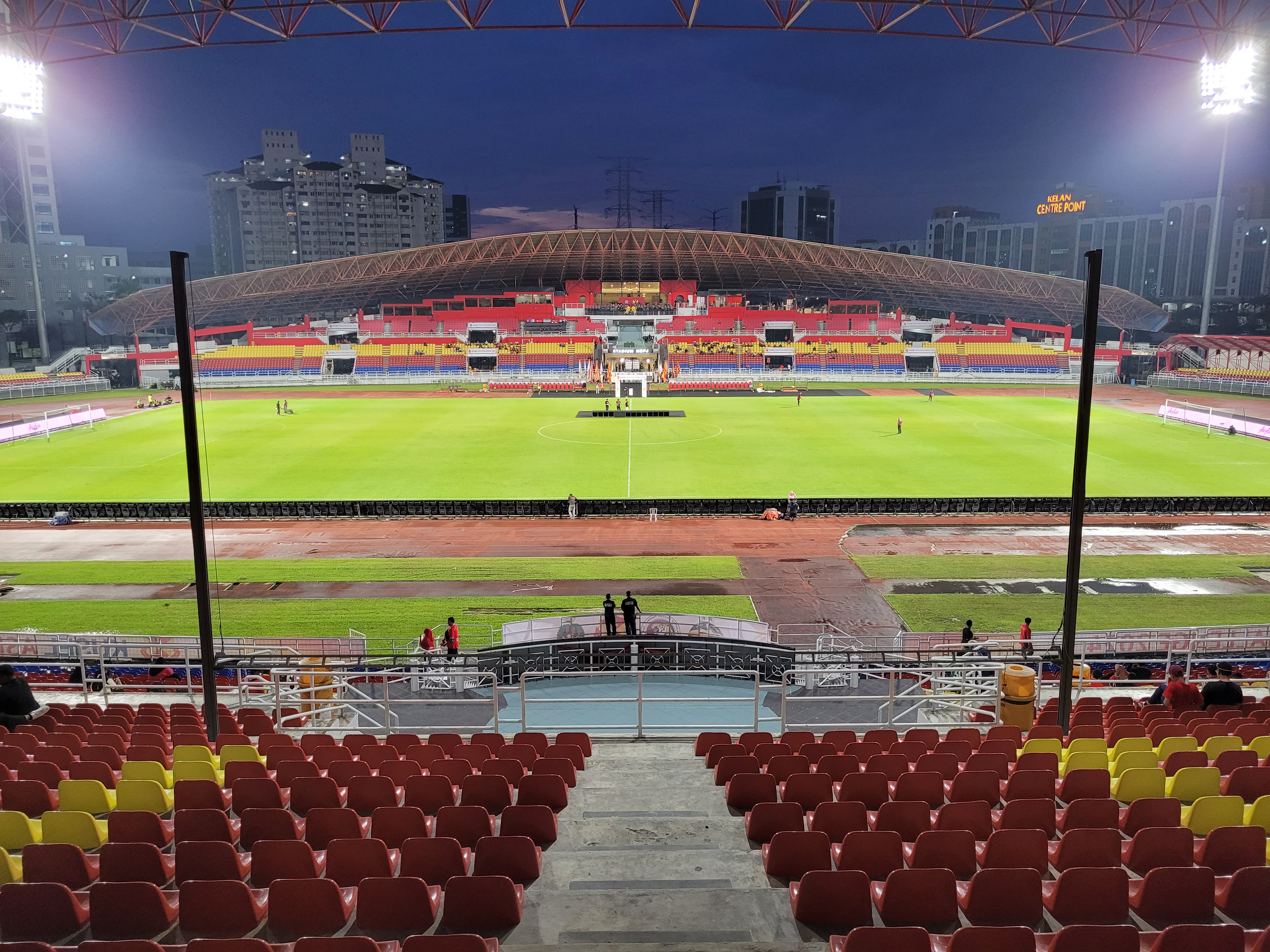
View from Home Open stand (2024)

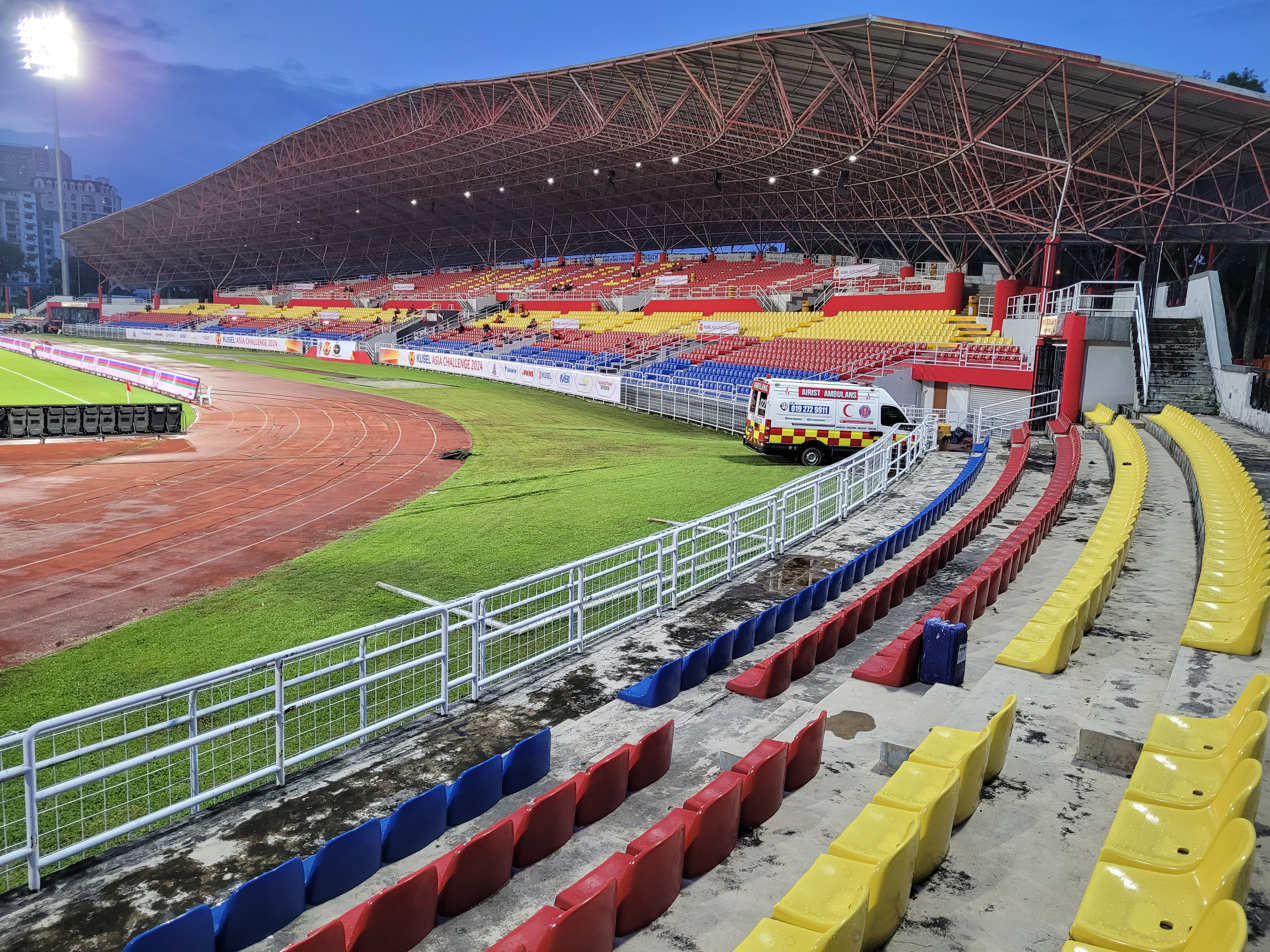
View of Home Open stand, from Away Open stand (2024)

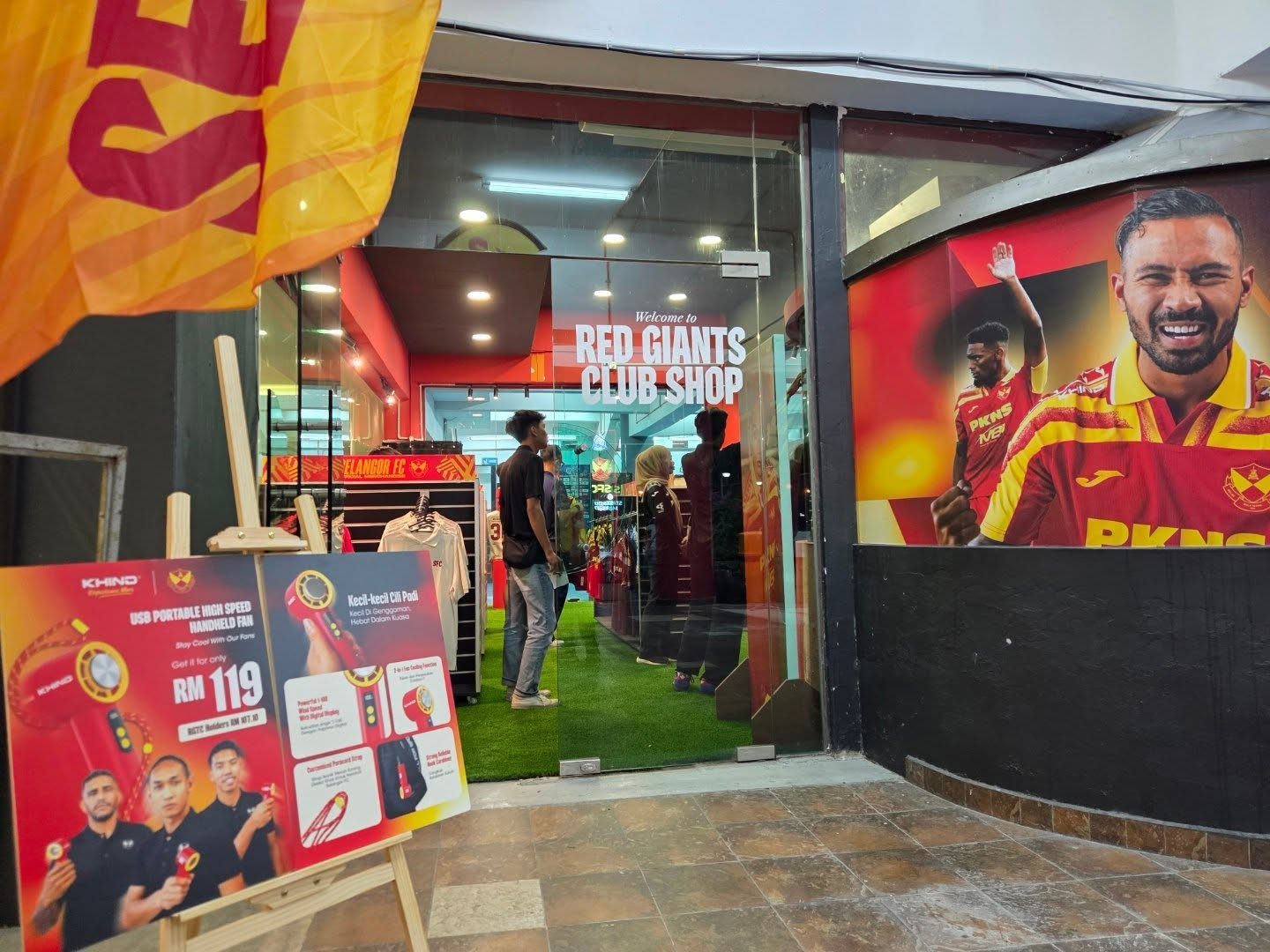
Red Giants Club Shop (2025)

== Notable football events ==
- 2024–25 AFC Champions League Two group stage match

== See also ==
- Sport in Malaysia
- Football in Malaysia
- List of stadiums in Malaysia
