= Multi-National Division =

Multi-National Division may refer to:

== Bosnia ==
- Multi-National Division (North) (Bosnia) (c.1996-1999)
- Multi-National Division (South-East) (c.1996-1999)
- Multi-National Division (South-West) (Bosnia) (c.1996-1999)

== Iraq ==
- Multi-National Division - Baghdad (c.2003-2011)
- Multinational Division Central (c.2003-2009)
- Multinational Division Central-South (c.2003-2008)
- Multi-National Division (North) (c.2003-2011)
- Multi-National Division (South) (c.2009-2011) (formed by the merger in 2009 of Multi-National Division (Center) and Multi-National Division (South East))
- Multi-National Division (South-East) (Iraq) (c.2003-2009)

== NATO ==
- Multinational Division Southeast, established in Romania 2015
- Multinational Division North East (NATO), established in Poland 2017, affiliated with the Multinational Corps Northeast
- Multinational Division North (NATO), established in Latvia 2019, affiliated with the Royal Danish Army
- Multinational Division South, established in Italy 2025

== See also ==
- Multinational (disambiguation)
- National Division (disambiguation)
