= National Basketball League (1898–1904) =

First professional basketball league in the world, 1898–1904

- Sport: Basketball
- Founded: August 1898; Philadelphia, Pennsylvania, U.S.
- Founder: Horace Fogel
- Folded: January 1904
- Last champion: Camden Skeeters (2nd title)
- Most titles: Trenton Potters (3 titles)

The National Basketball League (NBL) was the first professional basketball league in the world. Headquartered in Philadelphia, Pennsylvania, the league's teams stretched from New York City to central New Jersey, through the Philadelphia metropolitan area area and down to Wilmington, Delaware. The league began operations with the 1898–99 season and disbanded in January 1904, before completing the 1903–04 season.

== Background & Debut ==
In early 1898, the AAU sought to balance the newly-formed YMCA basketball leagues by drawing a line between amateur and professional players. This came after the 23rd Street YMCA, nicknamed "the Wanderers," won back to back AAU national championships in 1897 and 1898. Players on that team, including Sandy Shields and John Wendelken were the sport's first true stars and by 1898 were essentially professionals. So, the AAU, having only been formed ten years prior, placed restrictions barring professionals from the league. This put many players out of their jobs and caused outrage in the growing basketball community.

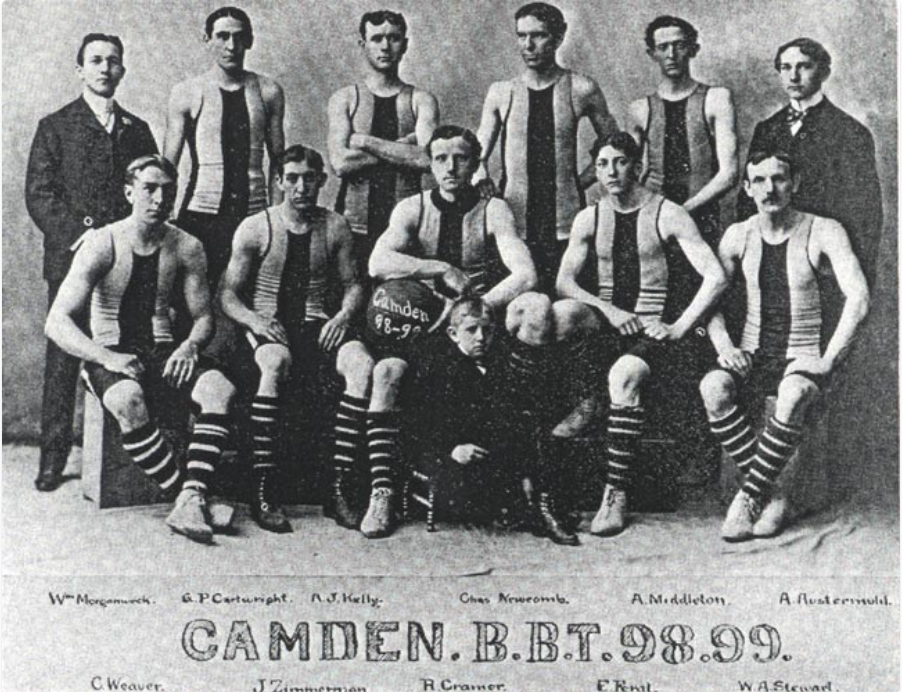
Camden Electrics, 1898-99

In August 1898, sportswriter and baseball manager Horace Fogel began the formation of the National Basketball League. The league began with six teams; three clubs from Philadelphia (Pennsylvania Bicycle Club, the Hancock Athletic Club, and the Germantown Club), and three dominant YMCA teams from New Jersey that were kicked out of the AAU (Millville Glass Blowers, Camden Electrics, and Trenton Nationals). The league expanded to eighteen teams in three divisions by October, but shrunk back down to six by the first game.

The league debuted on December 1, 1898, with a game between the Trenton Nationals and the Hancock Athletic Association at Textile Hall in Philadelphia's Kensington neighborhood. The Nationals rallied in the second half to win 21–19 in front of 900 fans. By New Year's Eve, Germantown and Hancock had both dropped out of the league. In March 1899, three players were suspended after playing in an exhibition game, which was a breach of contract. The Trenton Nationals, coached by Fred Cooper and led by early stars Al Cooper, Harry Stout, and Gus Endebrock, won the league's first championship with a record of 18-2.

== 1899-1902 ==
The beginning of the 1899-00 season was unstable for the NBL. All but two teams (the Trenton Potters and Camden Electrics) had left the league in the offseason, with Millville joining the Interstate League. The league scrambled to find new teams in time for the season, picking up the Bristol Pile Drivers, Chester, and the dominant 23rd Street Wanderers. The Pennsylvania Bicycle Club also rejoined the league. Trenton continued to dominate into the 1899-00 season, even with the Wanderers in the league. In January, Millville rejoined the NBL after negotions by Peter Wurfflein, a Philadelphia newspaper editor. Due to this, the NBL split the season in two, naming Trenton the champions of the first half.

In the second half of the season, Trenton's team became dysfunctional after feuds between Harry Stout and his teammates. The Wanderers suffered from the fatigue of being on the road, as they were the only New York team in the league. They also lost star player Sandy Shields, as he left to take a position as a coach in Homestead. Due to these factors, as well as the efforts of Firman Reeves and Walter Barber, the Millville Glass Blowers were able to get ahead in the league. They tied with the Potters in for the highest record in the league after a 15-3 blowout. This led Fogel to leave the title of champion up to a tiebreaker match between the two teams. The first attempt at the match ended in an 18-13 Millville victory, but Fogel decided not to count it, as they allowed Electrics player Hilly Wallace to play for the Glass Blowers. Millville's players then stormed off the court in the makeup match to protest Fogel's decision. Finally, Trenton won another makeup match 22-19 against Millville to be named 1900 NBL Champions.

The National Basketball League began the 1900–01 season with seven teams and an expanded schedule of 32 games. The Chester team, which had adopted the name of the Big Five, folded after going 0-6 in the 1899-00. They were replaced with a team from Burlington, New Jersey, known as the Shoe Pegs. With five of the seven teams finishing with records of .500 or better, NBL fans saw the good competitive play from most teams throughout the season. In this season the Camden team adopted the handle of Camden Skeeters. With the split season dropped, no playoffs were necessary, and the New York Wanderers captured the league title by three games.

The 1901 offseason saw the Wanderers announce their withdraw from the NBL due to fatigue from not playing home games. They rejoined right before the season started in November. Despite this, the 1901–02 season may have been the most successful year of the National Basketball League in terms of stability, with six strong franchises, namely the Bristol, New York, Trenton, Camden, Millville, and Philadelphia teams from the previous year. The schedule expanded once again to 40 games, all of which except for one were played. The league also went an entire season without a single change in teams. Camden had a winning record for the first time, but lost the league crown to the Bristol Pile Drivers by 3 games. Bristol had a 28–12 record.

== Decline ==
The 1902 offseason saw another major team, the Millville Glassblowers, once again withdraw from the league. However, unlike the Wanderers, they did not rejoin in time for the season. The league then picked up Conshohocken Giants and Wilmington Nationals of Pennsylvania and Delaware, respectively. Both Philadelphia and Burlington struggled heavily in the first half of the season. Burlington would end up merging with Bristol, while Philadelphia merged with Wilmington. Due to this all happening within the first month of the 1902-03 season, the NBL declared split season. The Camden Electrics, coached by Billy Morgenweck, cruised to a 36–9 record, a winning percentage of .800. Their first half record was 15–2, and the second half record was 21–7, being named NBL champions for both halves.

Things did not go very well during the 1903 offseason. Multiple teams lost their stars when the now-dominant Massachusetts leagues offered higher pay for players. After this, the Wanderers permanently left to form the Hudson River League. Bristol and Wilmington also left the league. Millville, however, rejoined the NBL, along with the St. Bridget's/Schuykill Falls Biddies. Trenton dropped out on December 26, 1903, and Camden left on December 31. The league was disbanded on January 4, 1904, and at least one lawsuit followed its demise. Billy Morgenweck was subsequently sued by investors in the Camden Skeeters.

== Champions ==
| Season | Champions | Record | Coach |
|---|---|---|---|
| 1898–99 | Trenton Nationals | 18-2 | Fred Cooper |
| 1899 | Trenton Nationals | ? | Fred Cooper |
| 1900 | Trenton Nationals | ? | Fred Cooper |
| 1900–01 | New York Wanderers | ? | Bob Adabie |
| 1901–02 | Bristol Pile Drivers | 28-12 | Charlie Klein |
| 1902 | Camden Skeeters | 15-2 | Pop Morgenweck |
| 1903 | Camden Skeeters | 21-7 | Pop Morgenweck |

== Points Leaders ==
| Season | Player | Team | Games Played | Points | Points per Game |
|---|---|---|---|---|---|
| 1898–99 | Al Cooper | Trenton Nationals | 16 | 141 | 8.8 |
| 1899–00 | Al Cooper (2) | Trenton Nationals | 23 | 213 | 9.3 |
| 1900–01 | Al Cooper (3) | Trenton Nationals | 27 | 290 | 10.7 |
| 1901–02 | Snake Deal | Camden Skeeters | 42 | 605 | 14.4 |
| 1902–03 | Snake Deal (2) | Camden Skeeters | 47 | 730 | 15.5 |
| 1903–04 | Walter Barber | Millville Glass Blowers | 11 | 191 | 17.4 |

== See also ==
- National Basketball League (United States) 1937–49 (defunct)
- NBL
