= Angela Kais =

Malaysian footballer

Personal information
- Full name: Angela anak Kais
- Date of birth: 17 September 1980 (age 46)
- Place of birth: Sarawak, Malaysia
- Height: 1.70 m (5 ft 7 in)
- Position: Forward

Senior career*
Years	Team	Apps	(Gls)
2000–2019	PDRM		

International career
2007–2017	Malaysia	37	(8)
- * Club domestic league appearances and goals

Angela Kais (born 17 September 1980) is a Malaysian police officer, former field hockey player and former footballer who plays as a forward.

A dual international, she is a former member of the Malaysia women's national field hockey team and Malaysia women's national football team, and has hold the captaincy of Malaysia women's football team between 2013 until 2016.

She was part of the team at the 2016 AFF Women's Championship. At club level she played for PDRM FA in Malaysia.

Before switching to football in 2007, she has represented Malaysia women's national field hockey team at the Commonwealth Games and Women's Hockey Asian Cup.

== International goals ==
No.	Date	Venue	Opponent	Score	Result	Competition
1.	11 September 2007	Thuwunna Stadium, Yangon	Philippines	1–0	2–1	2007 AFF Women's Championship
2.	20 October 2007	Jalan Besar Stadium, Singapore	Singapore	2–0	2–0	2008 AFC Women's Asian Cup qualification
3.	21 October 2011	New Laos National Stadium, Vientiane	Philippines	1–1	2–2	2011 AFF Women's Championship
4.	2 July 2013	Ramkhamhaeng University Stadium, Bangkok	Thailand	1–0	2–1	Friendly
5.	2 July 2013	Ramkhamhaeng University Stadium, Bangkok	Thailand	2–1	2–1	Friendly
6.	12 December 2013	Mandalarthiri Stadium, Mandalay, Myanmar	Laos	1–0	3–1	2013 Southeast Asian Games
7.	12 December 2013	Mandalarthiri Stadium, Mandalay, Myanmar	Laos	2–0	3–1	2013 Southeast Asian Games
8.	11 July 2016	Likas Stadium, Kota Kinabalu	Singapore	2–0	2–0	Friendly
