= 2022 Malaysia Premier Futsal League (women) =

Malaysia Premier Futsal League (women)
- Season: 2022
- Dates: 8–23 March 2022
- Champions: Melaka FA
- Matches: 30
- Goals: 207 (6.9 per match)
- Average goals/game: 6.9

The 2022 Malaysia Premier Futsal League (women), officially the Cuckoo Malaysia Premier Futsal League Women's Division, was a season of the women's Malaysia Premier Futsal League. Six teams took part, and the season was played in Shah Alam from 8 to 23 March 2022.

Melaka won the title after beating Selangor MBSJ 3–2 in the last match of the season. The match was decided by a late goal from Nur Syafiqah Zainal Abidin. Selangor MBSJ finished second and Sabah third.

== Teams ==
- Melaka FA
- Selangor MBSJ
- Sabah FA
- KL Prefer-Cyberlynx
- PDRM F.C.
- Kuala Lumpur

== League table ==
Pos	Team	Pld	W	D	L	GF	GA	GD	Pts
1	Melaka FA (C)	10	9	0	1	65	9	+56	27
2	Selangor MBSJ	10	8	1	1	54	12	+42	25
3	Sabah FA	10	5	1	4	35	18	+17	16
4	KL Prefer-Cyberlynx	10	5	0	5	34	32	+2	15
5	PDRM	10	1	1	8	13	52	−39	4
6	Kuala Lumpur	10	0	1	9	6	84	−78	1

Rules for classification: 1) Points; 2) Goal difference; 3) Number of goals scored.
(C) Champions
