= National Women's League =

National Women's League may refer to:

- National Women's League (Canada), a women's rugby union league in Canada
- National Women's League (Ghana), a women's football league in Ghana
- National Women's League (New Zealand), a women's football league in New Zealand

== See also ==
- Women's National League (disambiguation)
