= NBL =

NBL may refer to:

== Business ==
- Namibia Breweries Limited
- National Bank Limited, the first private sector bank fully owned by Bangladeshi entrepreneurs
- Nepal Bank Limited
- Noble Energy, a former oil and natural gas exploration and production company with the NYSE ticker symbol NBL, now part of Chevron Corporation
- North British Locomotive Company

== Science ==
- n-Butyllithium, an organic compound
- Neutral Buoyancy Laboratory, an astronaut training facility at NASA's Johnson Space Center
- New Brunswick Laboratory

== Sports ==
- National Badminton League (United Kingdom)
- National Basketball League (disambiguation)
- National Bicycle League (United States)
- National Bowling League (United States) – defunct
- North Bay League, now part of the North Coast Section (NCS) of the California Interscholastic Federation (CIF)

== Other uses ==
- North Berwick Law, a volcanic plug in East Lothian, Scotland, United Kingdom
- Northumberland, county in England, Chapman code
- Nuestra Belleza Latina, a reality television beauty pageant
