= National Basketball League =

National Basketball League may refer to:

- Indian National Basketball League
- Malaysia National Basketball League
- National Basketball League (1898–1904), U.S., first professional men's basketball league in the world
- National Basketball League (United States), 1937–49, merged with the Basketball Association of America to become the National Basketball Association
- National Basketball League (Australia)
- National Basketball League (Bulgaria)
- National Basketball League (Canada), 1993–94
- National Basketball League of Canada
- National Basketball League (China), professional men's basketball minor league in China
- National Basketball League (Czech Republic)
- National Basketball League (England)
- Indonesian Basketball League, known as National Basketball League 2010–2015
- National Basketball League (Japan)
- National Basketball League (Lithuania), semi-professional men's basketball league
- National Basketball League (New Zealand), semi-professional men's basketball league
- National Basketball League (Philippines), professional men's basketball league
- Rwanda Basketball League, formerly known as National Basketball League
- National Basketball League (Singapore)
- National Basketball League (Uganda)
- UAE National Basketball League, United Arab Emirates

== See also ==
- National Baseketball League, a fictional sports league in the film BASEketball
- American Basketball League (1925–1955)
- American Basketball League (1961–1962)
- National Basketball Association
- National Industrial Basketball League
- National Alliance of Basketball Leagues
- NBL (disambiguation)
