= National Ice Hockey League (disambiguation) =

The National Ice Hockey League is the second tier of professional hockey in England, Wales, and Scotland.

National Ice Hockey League may also refer to:

- Singapore National Ice Hockey League
- Liga Nacional de Hockey Hielo, the Spanish National Ice Hockey League

== See also ==
- List of ice hockey leagues, including entries for national leagues of ice hockey
- National Hockey League (ice hockey) of North America, the premiere global professional league
- National League (ice hockey), the Swiss elite league
- National League (disambiguation)
