= FAS Women's Super League =

- Organising body: Football Association of Selangor
- Founded: October 2021; 5 years ago
- First season: 2021–22
- Country: Malaysia
- Confederation: AFC
- Number of clubs: 13
- Domestic cup: Tun Sharifah Rodziah Cup
- League cup(s): FAS Women's FA Cup; FAS Women's Confederations Cup; FAS Women's Sumbangsih Cup
- Current champions: Selangor (1st title) (2026)
- Most championships: MBSJ FC (3 titles)
- Broadcaster: Astro Arena (selected matches)
- Website: https://faselangor.my/
- Current: 2026 FAS Women's Super League

The FAS Women's Super League is one of women's football leagues in Malaysia. Established in 2021, it is run by the Football Association of Selangor and features 16 teams. The Super League was created to provide a safe football atmosphere for women, in addition to being a platform to promote the amateur women's football scene in Selangor. Negeri Sembilan was the inaugural champion by winning the league in 2021–22, while MBSJ FC won the league in the 2023, 2024 and 2025 season. The current champion is Selangor.

== Competition format ==
The Super League format has undergone significant changes since its inception, primarily due to increase in the number of participats. As of the 2026 season, there are 13 teams drawn in 2 groups of 7 and 6. During the course of a season, each team plays the others once at the centralised venue of MBSJ Arena. The top eight teams advance to the play-offs, while the other five teams advance to the FAS Women's Confederations Cup. Teams are ranked by total points, then goal difference and goals scored. If still equal, teams are deemed to occupy the same position. The top eight teams start in the quarter-final round, with the team having the highest points in the group stage receiving the highest seed in the draw. The team that wins the play-off final will be crowned the Super League champion. Super League matches are composed of two 35-minute halves. Teams enter the Super League by invitation of the Football Association of Selangor.

Competition format timeline
Season	Teams	Group stage		Play-offs	Venue
Season	Teams	Match-weeks	Matches	Play-offs	Venue
2021–22	10	5	20	Play-offs with eight teams	Radia Arena, MBSJ Arena
2023	12	4	30	Play-offs with eight teams	Radia Arena, MBPJ Stadium
2024	14	7	42	Play-offs with eight teams	MBSJ Arena
2025	16	7	56	Play-offs with eight teams	MPAJ Stadium
2026	13	7	36	Play-offs with eight teams	MBSJ Arena

== Teams ==
A total of 31 teams have played in the Super League from its inception.

=== Current teams ===
Team	Previous position	First season	Number of seasons	Titles	Last title
BT3W Perak	—N/a	2026	1	0	—N/a
FC Japan Malaysia	4th in Group B	2024	3	0	—N/a
Galaxi Girls PJ	5th in Group A	2024	4	0	—N/a
KL Havana	—N/a	2026	1	0	—N/a
KL Rangers	Quarter-finals	2025	2	0	—N/a
KL Spicegals	4th in Group A	2023	4	0	—N/a
MBPJ FC	Semi-finals	2024	3	0	—N/a
Selangor	Semi-finals	2024	3	0	—N/a
SSM Pahang	Runner-up	2025	2	0	—N/a
SSS Leopard	Quarter-finals	2021–22	4	0	—N/a
Sternen FC SA	8th in Group A	2023	4	0	—N/a
Velocity FC Setia Alam	6th in Group B	2025	2	0	—N/a
Wangsa Maju City	6th in Group A	2025	2	0	—N/a

=== Former teams ===
Former teams of FAS Women's Super League
Team	Joined	Final season	Best finish
First 11 FC	2021–22	2021–22	Semi-finals (2021–22)
Kelana United	2023	2023	Semi-finals (2023)
MBSJ FC	2021–22	2025	Champions (2023, 2024, 2025)
Negeri Sembilan FA	2023	2023	5th in group stage (2023)
Negeri Sembilan FC	2021–22	2021–22	Champions (2021–22)
Perkemas FC Wangsa Maju	2024	2024	Quarter-finals (2024)
PJKita FC	2023	2023	Quarter-finals (2023)
PNSB FC Shah Alam	2023	2024	Quarter-finals (2024)
Radia Ladies	2021–22	2021–22	5th in group stage (2021–22)
Penang Real CJ	2024	2025	8th in group stage (2025)
Rhym Rovers	2021–22	2021–22	5th in group stage (2021–22)
Shah Alam FC Swat	2021–22	2024	Semi-finals (2021–22)
SBN Mixstars	2025	2025	7th in group stage (2025)
Selangor Red Giants	2025	2025	Quarter-finals (2025)
Shah Alam United	2021–22	2025	6th in group stage (2024)
The Footsouls	2021–22	2021–22	Runners-up (2021–22)
UiTM United Lioness	2021–22	2024	Runners-up (2024)
UPNM FC	2023	2023	Runners-up (2023)

== Past champions ==
The final match of the Super League play-offs determines that season's Super League champion. In addition to receiving the league trophy, the champion receives RM10,000.

List of FAS Women's Super League finals
Season	Champions	Score	Runners-up	Venue	Ref.
2021–22	Negeri Sembilan FC	1–0	The Footsouls	MBSJ Arena, Subang Jaya	
2023	MBSJ FC	1–1 (3–0p)	UPNM FC	MBPJ Stadium, Petaling Jaya	
2024	MBSJ FC	3–0	UiTM United Lioness	MBSJ Arena, Subang Jaya	
2025	MBSJ FC	5–1	SSM Pahang	MPAJ Stadium, Ampang Jaya	
2026	Selangor	3–1	MBPJ FC	MBSJ Arena, Subang Jaya	

== Championship records ==
Italics indicate former team.

Team	Winners	Runners-up	Years won	Years runners-up
MBSJ FC	3	0	2023, 2024, 2025	—
Negeri Sembilan FC	1	0	2021–22	—
Selangor	1	0	2026	—
The Footsouls	0	1	—	2021–22
UPNM FC	0	1	—	2023
UiTM United Lioness	0	1	—	2024
SSM Pahang	0	1	—	2025
MBPJ FC	0	1	—	2026

== Other competitions ==
In addition to the Super League, the Football Association of Selangor runs three other women's football tournaments: the FAS Women's FA Cup, the FAS Women's Confederation Cup and the FAS Women's Sumbangsih Cup.

=== FAS Women's FA Cup ===
Season	Champions	Score	Runners-up	Venue	Ref.
2024	MBPJ FC	2–1	UiTM United Lioness	MBSJ Arena, Subang Jaya	
2025	MBSJ FC	3–0	FC Japan Malaysia	MPAJ Stadium, Ampang Jaya	
2026	Selangor	4–0	MBPJ FC	MBSJ Arena, Subang Jaya	

=== FAS Women's Confederations Cup ===
The FAS Women's Confederation Cup serves as a platform for teams that didn't qualify for the top league spots.

Season	Champions	Score	Runners-up	Venue	Ref.
2024	SA United	1–0	Penang Real CJ	MBSJ Arena, Subang Jaya	
2025	Galaxi Girls PJ	1–0	Wangsa Maju City	MPAJ Stadium, Ampang Jaya	
2026	KL Havana	2–0	Galaxi Girls PJ	MBSJ Arena, Subang Jaya	

=== FAS Women's Sumbangsih Cup ===
The FAS Women's Sumbangsih Cup is an annual match contested between the champions of the previous Super League season and the holders of the FA Cup.

Season	Champions	Score	Runners-up	Venue	Ref.
2025	MBSJ FC	8–0	MBPJ FC	MPAJ Stadium, Ampang Jaya	
