= Farahiyah Ridzuan =

Malaysian women's footballer (born 1993)

Farahiyah Muhamad Ridzuan
Personal information
- Full name: Farahiyah binti Muhamad Ridzuan
- Date of birth: 20 December 1993 (age 32)
- Place of birth: Kota Bharu, Kelantan, Malaysia
- Height: 1.56 m (5 ft 1 1/2 in)
- Position: Midfielder

Team information
- Current team: Sabah
- Number: 27

Senior career*
Years	Team	Apps	(Gls)
2023	MBPJ FC		
2024	Kelana United		
2025	MBSJ FC		
2026–	Sabah		

International career
- Malaysia futsal
2023–	Malaysia		
Medal record
Women's futsal
SEA Games
Bronze medal – third place	2013 Nay Pyi Taw	Futsal
- * Club domestic league appearances and goals

Farahiyah binti Muhamad Ridzuan (born 20 December 1993 in Kota Bharu) simply known as Dekyah, is a Malaysian women's footballer who currently plays as a midfielder for Malaysia National Women's League club MBSJ and the Malaysia national team. She also plays for Malaysia futsal team.

== Career ==
Farahiyah started her career as a futsal player. She has represented the Malaysia women's national futsal team. At the 2013 SEA Games, she won a bronze medal in the women's futsal tournament.

In September 2015, Farahiyah was crowned the top scorer at the 2015 AFC Women's Futsal Championship. She scored a total of 7 goals in the tournament. Due to a knee injury, she did not play with the national women's futsal squad at the 2017 SEA Games.

In 2023, Farahiyah switched her career to football. She also represents the Malaysian women's national football team. Farahiyah signed with MBPJ FC. In 2024 season, she playing for Kelana United FC. In 2025, she signed with his new club MBSJ FC and making some appearances in the National Women's League.

== Honours ==
Futsal

- SEA Games: Bronze 2013

Individual

- 2015 AFC Women's Futsal Championship: Top scorer
