= MBSJ F.C. Women =

Malaysian women's association football club

MBSJ
- Full name: Majlis Bandaraya Subang Jaya Football Club Women
- Short name: MBSJ
- Founded: 2020; 5 years ago
- Ground: MBSJ Arena, Subang Jaya
- Capacity: 1,000
- Owner: Subang Jaya City Council
- Head coach: Mohd Fairuz Mohd Noor
- League: National Women's League
- 2025: Third place

MBSJ FC Women (Malay: Kelab Bola Sepak Wanita Majlis Bandaraya Subang Jaya) is a professional Malaysian women's football club based in Subang Jaya, Selangor. The team is owned and managed by the Subang Jaya City Council (Majlis Bandaraya Subang Jaya or MBSJ). It competes in the National Women's League and the FAS Women's Super League, the top women's state-level football competition under the Football Association of Malaysia (FAM) and Football Association of Selangor (FAS). MBSJ FC Women play their home matches at Arena MBSJ.

== History ==
MBSJ FC Women was established in 2020 to promote women's participation in football. The club rose to prominence in the local scene through youth development and recruitment of national-level players. MBSJ FC Women has emerged as one of the most successful clubs in the FAS Women’s Super League since its inception. They have won back-to-back league titles in 2023 (by defeating UPNM in a penalty shootout) and 2024 (a dominant 3–0 victory over UiTM United Lioness in the final). In 2024, MBSJ FC was awarded RM 10,000 prize money as league champions. The club has expressed its intention to participate in national-level tournaments such as the Piala Tun Sharifah Rodziah.

== Players ==
=== Current squad ===
As of 24 October 2025

Note: Flags indicate national team as defined under FIFA eligibility rules; some limited exceptions apply. Players may hold more than one non-FIFA nationality.

No.	Pos.	Nation	Player
1	GK	MAS	Nuralyaa Natasha
6	DF	MAS	Norshahira Suhaime
8	MF	MAS	Farahiyah Ridzuan
9	DF	MAS	Steffi Sarge Kaur (captain)
10	DF	MAS	Fatin Shahida Azmi
11	MF	MAS	Andrea Lee
12	MF	MAS	Siti Asnidah Zamri
13	MF	MAS	Nur Afrina Azhar
15	DF	MAS	Naziratul Amira
17	MF	MAS	Nur Syafiqah Zainal Abidin

No.	Pos.	Nation	Player
18	FW	MAS	Nur Shazreen Munazli
19	MF	MAS	Dian Aqilah Imran
20	FW	MAS	Nur Adrienna Zamzaihiri
21	DF	MAS	Nur Balqis Zamrin
22	GK	MAS	Zawani Nisha
23	FW	MAS	Intan Sarah
25	DF	MAS	Josephine Angkun
26	DF	MAS	Nur Dhiyaa Addin
27	MF	MAS	Hanis Farhana
29	GK	MAS	Nurul Husna Zulkepli

== Management ==
=== Coaching staff ===
As of 24 October 2025

Position	Staff
Team manager	(Malaysia) Sharifah Rohaida Abd Rahman
Assistant manager	(Malaysia) Mohd Zulhilmi Bin Rosli
Head coach	(Malaysia) Mohd Fairuz Mohd Noor
Assistant coach	(Malaysia) Lanti Anak Manggi
Goalkeeper coach	(Malaysia) Zainurin Abd Kadir
Fitness coach	(Malaysia) Khairul Muzhafar Abd Ghani
Physiotherapist	(Malaysia) Raja Nur Amarina Raja Azizan
Team admin	(Malaysia) Norsilawati Mohamed Yatim
Team media	(Malaysia) Noor Afifah Hussin
Kitman	(Malaysia) Mohd Hafizzain Zamri

== Honours ==
=== League ===
- FAS Women's Super League
  - Champions (2): 2023, 2024
- Malaysia National Women's League
  - Third place (1): 2025

=== Cup ===
- FAS Women's Sumbangsih Cup
  - Champions (1): 2025
