= 2024–25 Malaysia A2 Amateur League =

Malaysian football season

Al-Ikhsan Cup
- Dates: 19 July – 6 December 2024
- Champions: Guar Syed Alwi
- Premiers: Kelantan WTS
- Promoted: Guar Syed Alwi; Kelantan WTS
- Matches: 85
- Goals: 193 (2.27 per match)
- Best player: Aziz Ismail (Kelantan WTS)
- Top goalscorer: 14 goals Fa’es Hafize (AAK Ultimate)
- Biggest home win: SJ Virtuosos 16–0 Real Mambau (21 September 2024)
- Biggest away win: Real Mambau 0–10 BR United (17 August 2024)
- Highest scoring: SJ Virtuosos 16–0 Real Mambau (21 September 2024)
- Highest attendance: 2,000; SAMB 4–0 JAKIM (27 July 2024)
- Lowest attendance: 20; AAK Ultimate 2–0 Semantan Troopers; Real Mambau 0–10 BR United (17 August 2024)
- Attendance: 2,398 (28 per match)
- All statistics correct as of 7 December 2024.

The 2024–25 Malaysia A2 Amateur League (Malay: Liga Amatur A2 Malaysia), formerly the Malaysia M4 League, also known as the Al-Ikhsan Cup for sponsorship reasons, was the third season of the Malaysia A2 Amateur League, the third tier football league of the Malaysian football league system.

== Format ==
The tournament is played as follows:

- League level: 16 teams are divided into Zone 1 (4 teams), Zone 2 (6 teams) and Zone 3 (6 teams), each drawn from the north/east coast, central and south/Putrajaya regions.
  - Round 1: Divided into three zones, each team will play at home and away to determine the position in the group. The top two teams in each zone, including third team in Zones 2 & 3, will advance to the knockout stage.
- Knockout stage: The knockout stage is the match to determine the winner. Finalists will be promoted to the 2025–26 Malaysia A1 Semi-Pro League.

== Team changes ==
The following teams have changed division since the 2023 season.

=== To Al-Ikhsan Cup ===
Relegated from the MBSB Bank Championship

- (Selangor) Naga UKS

Promoted from the M5 League

- Guar Syed Alwi – Perlis Super League Winner.
- (Perak) Pencinta Setia – PBDLMS League participate.
- (Kuala Lumpur) Kampong Ku – KLFA M5 League Winner.
- (Selangor) NBK Empire – A-Ligue Champions League runner-up.
- (Selangor) Gombak City – MAHSA-KRONOS League Winner.
- SJ Virtuosos – Putrajaya League Winner.
- (Negeri Sembilan) Real Mambau – A-Ligue Nismilan third place.
- (Negeri Sembilan) Bunga Raya II – RAFA Southern Selangor League runners-up.
- Semantan Troopers – Pahang Amateur League runners-up.

Invited teams

- (Kedah) Kuala Muda
- (Malacca) SAMB

=== From Al-Ikhsan Cup ===
Promoted to the A1 Semi-Pro League

- (Negeri Sembilan) Bunga Raya
- (Sarawak) Machan
- (Selangor) UiTM United
- Yayasan Pahang Maintenance

Relegated to the A3 Community League

- (Pahang) Kuantan City
- (Negeri Sembilan) NS Cyberfox
- (Terengganu) Real Chukai
- (Selangor) Republic of Borneo

Dissolved (Borneo Zone)^{^{1}}

- (Sarawak) Susun Tenaga Resources
- (Sarawak) Mukah Youth Team
- (Sarawak) Maqarize

=== Name changes ===
- Naga UKS decided to merge with AAK F.C. and changed its name to AAK Ultimate and relocated to Puncak Alam, Selangor.
- (Selangor) MAHSA City were renamed to MAHSA United
- (Selangor) Gombak City were renamed to Selayang City
- (Negeri Sembilan) Bunga Raya FC II were renamed to Bunga Raya United

Notes:

^1 The participation of teams from the Borneo Zone was temporarily suspended due to the insufficient number of teams for the competition to be played.

== Venues and locations ==
Locations of teams in the 2024–25 Malaysia A2 Amateur League.
Red: Zone 1; Blue: Zone 2; Green: Zone 3;

Team	Location	Stadium	Capacity
(Selangor) AAK Ultimate	Puncak Alam	Seksyen 4 Shah Alam Football Field, Shah Alam	800
(Negeri Sembilan) BR United	Seremban	Arena IRC Sendayan, Bandar Sri Sendayan	700
(Perlis) Guar Syed Alwi	Kangar	Tuanku Syed Putra Stadium	20,000
(Putrajaya) JAKIM	Putrajaya	Azman Hashim Sports Arena UKM, Kajang	1,000
(Kuala Lumpur) Kampong Ku	Kampung Baru, Kuala Lumpur	Jalan Raja Muda Abdul Aziz Mini Stadium	3,500
(Kedah) Kuala Muda	Kuala Muda	Sungai Petani Municipal Council Sports Complex	2,500
(Selangor) MAHSA United	Jenjarom	MAHSA University Mini Stadium	1,000
(Negeri Sembilan) MP Port Dickson	Port Dickson	Padang Merdeka Port Dickson	1,500
(Selangor) NBK Empire	Gombak	MAHSA University Mini Stadium	1,000
(Perak) Pencinta Setia	Taiping, Perak	Matang Football Field, Matang, Perak	900
(Negeri Sembilan) Real Mambau	Mambau	UiTM Seremban 3 Football Field, Seremban	600
(Malacca) SAMB	Melaka City	Hang Tuah Stadium	3,000
(Selangor) Selayang City	Gombak	Taman Kanching Mini Stadium, Rawang	700
(Pahang) Semantan Troopers	Temerloh	Temerloh Mini Stadium	10,000
(Putrajaya) SJ Virtuosos	Putrajaya	Sime Darby Training Ground, Bukit Jelutong	1,000
(Kelantan) WTS	Pasir Mas	Pasir Mas Mini Stadium	7,000

== Team summary ==
Team	Head coach	Captain	Kit manufacturer
AAK Ultimate	(Malaysia) Mohd Hasmawi Hassan	(Malaysia) Azmi Muslim	AAK Sportswear
BR United	(Malaysia) Syah Juan Mohd Nor	(Malaysia) S. Gawsigan	Kimicom
Guar Syed Alwi	(Malaysia) Firdaus Abdul Rahman	(Malaysia) Hafiz Abdul Karim	Idan's Design
JAKIM	(Malaysia) Mohd Nazim Bin Din	(Malaysia) Nor Saiful Abd Rahman	Alpha Sport
Kampong Ku	(Malaysia) Rajasparan a/l V. Naidu	(Malaysia) Azrul Razman	UMU Apparel
Kuala Muda	(Malaysia) Koet King Heyong	(Malaysia) Firdaus Abdul Rahman	Lakoh Sport
MAHSA United	(Malaysia) Yogeswaran a/l Veeramalai	(Malaysia) Izham Nor Alizan	Kronos
MP Port Dickson	(Malaysia) Adnan Md Din	(Malaysia) Zaidi Othman	Alpha Sport
NBK Empire	(Malaysia) Noor Ismadi Ismail	(Malaysia) Hazromie Zullkifli	PUC Sport
Pencinta Setia	(Malaysia) Muhammad Suhaimi Bin Idris	(Malaysia) Rahmat Rahim	TSR apparel
Real Mambau	(Malaysia) Al-Hasrizal Al-Mustafi	(Malaysia) Alif Yusof	Forfit
SAMB	(Malaysia) Rahim Abu Bakar	(Malaysia) Syafiq Samad	ZeroFour
Selayang City	(Malaysia) Reman Ragunathan	(Malaysia) Muhammad Imran Syahmi	Let's Play Performance
Semantan Troopers	(Malaysia) Ehsam bin Long	(Malaysia) C. Kumaresan	Alpha Sport
SJ Virtuosos	(Malaysia) Khairulbahar Taib	(Malaysia) Haziq Mohd Noh	M1 Sports
WTS	(Malaysia) Che Saupi Ibrahim	(Malaysia) Khairul Rizam Che Soh	Ace Store Printing

== Standings ==
=== Zone 1 (north/east coast) ===
Pos	Team	Pld	W	D	L	GF	GA	GD	Pts	Promotion or qualification
1	WTS	6	6	0	0	18	5	+13	18	Advance to Knockout round & MBSB Bank Championship
2	Guar Syed Alwi (C)	6	4	0	2	20	7	+13	12	Advance to Knockout round & MBSB Bank Championship
3	Kuala Muda	6	2	0	4	10	12	−2	6	
4	Pencinta Setia	6	0	0	6	1	25	−24	0	

Updated to match(es) played on 12 October 2024. Source: FAM-CMS
(C) Champions

=== Fixtures and results ===
Home \ Away	WTS	GUA	KUM	PEN
WTS		1–0	3–1	5–0
Guar Syed Alwi	3–4		4–2	7–0
Kuala Muda	0–3	0–2		3–0
Pencinta Setia	1–2	0–4	0–4	

Updated to match(es) played on 12 October 2024. Source: FAM-CMS
Legend: Blue = home team win; Yellow = draw; Red = away team win.
For upcoming matches, an "a" indicates there is an article about the rivalry between the two participants.

==== Matchweek 1 ====
19 July 2024	Guar Syed Alwi	4–2	Kuala Muda	Kangar
20:45 UTC+8	Nashrul Shazrin 13', 90+1'; Haziq Mu'iz 22'; Arif Nazdman 30'	Report	Firdaus 7' (pen.); Fakhrul Kuzaimi 30'	Stadium: Tuanku Syed Putra Stadium; Attendance: 868; Referee: Mohd Afdzal Hilmi Bin Zulkiflee

20 July 2024	Pencinta Setia	1–2	WTS	Matang, Taiping
16:45 UTC+8	Azril 87'	Report	Khairul Rizam 2'; Fakhrul Zaman 45+2'	Stadium: PSFC Football Field; Attendance: 300; Referee: Shamil Jaafar

==== Matchweek 2 ====
10 August 2024	WTS	1–0	Guar Syed Alwi	Pasir Mas
20:45 UTC+8	Khairul Rizam 24'	Report		Stadium: Pasir Mas Mini Stadium; Attendance: 350; Referee: Khairul Anwar Bin Abllah Abdullah

10 August 2024	Kuala Muda	3–0	Pencinta Setia	Sungai Petani
16:45 UTC+8	Firdaus 39', 45+1'; Izzat Zuhairie 50'	Report		Stadium: Sungai Petani Municipal Council Sports Complex; Attendance: 200; Referee: Hafiy Hazmi Bin Harun

==== Matchweek 3 ====
24 August 2024	Pencinta Setia	0–4	Guar Syed Alwi	Matang, Taiping
16:45 UTC+8		Report	Ikmal Azmi 2', 28'; Muhaimin Shahab 82'; Hazwan Hassan 82'	Stadium: PSFC Football Field; Attendance: 200; Referee: Hasrul Abdul Rahman

24 August 2024	Kuala Muda	0–3	WTS	Sungai Petani
16:45 UTC+8		Report	Nazrin Nawi 45+1'; Fakhrul Zaman 56'; Nazri Ahmad 63'	Stadium: Sungai Petani Municipal Council Sports Complex; Attendance: 453; Referee: Nafeez Wahab

==== Matchweek 4 ====
14 September 2024	Kuala Muda	0–2	Guar Syed Alwi	Sungai Petani
16:45 UTC+8		Report	Hazwan Hassan 2'; Haziq Mu'iz Abdul 72'	Stadium: Sungai Petani Municipal Council Sports Complex; Attendance: 238; Referee: Mohamad Izzat Izaini Ali

14 September 2024	WTS	5–0	Pencinta Setia	Pasir Mas
16:45 UTC+8	Zaharulnizam 23', 70'; Nazri Ahmad 39'; Sufyan Suhaimi 73'(o.g.); Faizwan Abdullah 85'	Report		Stadium: Wan Tendong Football Field; Attendance: 350; Referee: Mohamad Ikhmal Isa

==== Matchweek 5 ====
5 October 2024	Pencinta Setia	0–4	Kuala Muda	Parit Buntar
16:45 UTC+8		Report	Fakhrul Kuzaimi 26', 28', 35'; Adam Mohd Yusri 55'	Stadium: Parit Buntar Stadium; Attendance: 50; Referee: Muhammad Amirul Bin Mohd Yusoff

5 October 2024	Guar Syed Alwi	3–4	WTS	Kangar
20:45 UTC+8	Haziq Mu'iz Abdul 17'; Ikmal Ibrahim 30'; Mohd Ikmal Faiz 90+4'	Report	Haikal Musyrif 11'; Faizwan Abdullah 34', 66'; Nazrin Nawi 51' (pen.)	Stadium: Tuanku Syed Putra Stadium; Attendance: 196; Referee: Khairulsyahmi Ahmad Khalidi

==== Matchweek 6 ====
12 October 2024	WTS	3–1	Kuala Muda	Pasir Mas
16:45 UTC+8	Khairul Rizam 22' (pen.); Faizwan Abdullah 44', 88'	Report	Firdaus Abdul Rahman 53'	Stadium: Wan Tendong Football Field; Attendance: 150; Referee: Hasrol Amir

12 October 2024	Guar Syed Alwi	7–0	Pencinta Setia	Sintok
20:45 UTC+8	Ikmal Ibrahim 6'; Nashrul Shazrin Roslan 13'; Ikmal Faiz 17', 32'; Azrizan Ahmad 53', 75'; Farhan Rosli 86'	Report		Stadium: UUM Stadium; Attendance: 100; Referee: Nafeez Wahab

=== Zone 2 (central) ===
Pos	Team	Pld	W	D	L	GF	GA	GD	Pts	Promotion or qualification
1	AAK Ultimate	10	9	0	1	36	3	+33	27	Advance to Knockout Round
2	Kampong Ku	10	7	2	1	32	13	+19	23	Advance to Knockout Round
3	Semantan Troopers	10	6	1	3	24	19	+5	19	Advance to Knockout Round
4	NBK Empire	10	2	2	6	14	23	−9	8	
5	MAHSA United	10	2	2	6	14	24	−10	8	
6	Selayang City	10	0	1	9	7	45	−38	1	

Updated to match(es) played on 12 October 2024. Source: FAM-CMS
Rules for classification: 1) Points; 2) Goal difference; 3) Number of goals scored.

=== Fixtures and results ===
Home \ Away	AAK	SEM	SEL	KGK	MAH	NBK
AAK Ultimate		2–0	11–0	1–0	3–0	3–0
Semantan Troopers	0–4		7–2	2–2	3–1	2–1
Selayang City	0–5	0–3		2–6	0–2	1–4
Kampong Ku	2–1	3–0	2–0		3–3	5–2
MAHSA United	1–5	2–3	4–1	1–4		1–3
NBK Empire	0–1	2–4	1–1	1–5	0–0	

Updated to match(es) played on 12 October 2024. Source: FAM-CMS
Legend: Blue = home team win; Yellow = draw; Red = away team win.
For upcoming matches, an "a" indicates there is an article about the rivalry between the two participants.

=== Fixtures and results ===
==== Matchweek 1 ====
20 July 2024	NBK Empire	0–0	MAHSA United	Jenjarom
16:45 UTC+8		Report		Stadium: MAHSA University Mini Stadium; Attendance: 60; Referee: Zul Hariz Ab Aziz

20 July 2024	Kampong Ku	3–0	Semantan Troopers	Kampung Baru
16:45 UTC+8	Ridhwan 14'; K. Darwinrajoo 26'; Alif Izwan 60' (pen.)	Report		Stadium: Jalan Raja Muda Abdul Aziz Mini Stadium; Attendance: 200; Referee: Muhd Aizad Bin Damanhuri

2 August 2024	Selayang City	0–5	AAK Ultimate	Selayang
20:45 UTC+8		Report	Shukor Azmi 42', 55'; Naufal Akif 45+1'; Fa’es Hafize 46'; Azmi Muslim 88'	Stadium: Selayang Stadium; Attendance: 100; Referee: Muhamad Arif Bin Ismail

==== Matchweek 2 ====
26 July 2024	Selayang City	1–4	NBK Empire	Selayang
20:45 UTC+8	Hadzirun 26'	Report	Faes Hakimi 45+1', 54'; Hazromie 59'; Amirul Aiman 71'	Stadium: Selayang Stadium; Attendance: 150; Referee: Mohd Sufi Rozan

27 July 2024	Semantan Troopers	3–1	MAHSA United	Temerloh
16:45 UTC+8	Helmi Ikhmal 39'; Fariq Sahan 50'; Nazarul Amir Idham 90+3'	Report	Fadzilah Jalaludin 82' (pen.)	Stadium: Temerloh Mini Stadium; Attendance: 219; Referee: Muhammad Almi Bin Abdullah

27 July 2024	AAK Ultimate	1–0	Kampong Ku	Shah Alam
16:45 UTC+8	Fa'es Hafize 13'	Report		Stadium: Seksyen 4 Shah Alam Football Field; Attendance: 70; Referee: Ahmad Nawawi Amir

==== Matchweek 3 ====
10 August 2024	NBK Empire	2–4	Semantan Troopers	Kajang
16:45 UTC+8	Amirul Aiman 54', 90+1' (pen.)	Report	M. Lingeswaran 24'; Zulhisyam Zulkifli 56'; Fariq Sahan 90+3'; Nazarul Amir Idham 90+7' (pen.)	Stadium: Azman Hashim Sports Arena, UKM; Attendance: 98; Referee: Zulkarnain Zakaria

10 August 2024	Selayang City	2–6	Kampong Ku	Rawang
16:45 UTC+8	Hadzirun Che Hamid 53'; Syahmil Afiq 90+3'	Report	Shahir Adzha 15'(o.g.); Sufi Amar 2'; K. Darwinrajoo 21' (pen.); Farhan Ab Hamid 55', 73'; Ridhwan Johan 67'	Stadium: Taman Kanching Mini Stadium; Attendance: 105; Referee: Mohamad Zul Hariz

10 August 2024	MAHSA United	1–5	AAK Ultimate	Jenjarom
16:45 UTC+8	Iqbal Khairol Azmi 79'	Report	Fa’es Hafize 22'; Irfan Bustamam 35'; Naufal Akif 54', 57'; Shukor Azmi 74'	Stadium: MAHSA University Mini Stadium; Attendance: 100; Referee: Anselm Enterang

==== Matchweek 4 ====
17 August 2024	MAHSA United	4–1	Selayang City	Jenjarom
16:45 UTC+8	P. Puventhan 3'; Naufal Al-Hakim 14'; Danish Ameer 88'; Afdhal 90+4'	Report	Hadzirun Che Hamid 31'	Stadium: MAHSA University Mini Stadium; Attendance: 100; Referee: Zulkarnain Bin Zakaria

17 August 2024	AAK Ultimate	2–0	Semantan Troopers	Shah Alam
16:45 UTC+8	Fa’es Hafize 19'; Faris Razak 90+2'	Report		Stadium: Seksyen 4 Shah Alam Football Field; Attendance: 20; Referee: Amirul Izzat Bin Rusli

20 August 2024	Kampong Ku	5–2	NBK Empire	Kuala Lumpur
20:45 UTC+8	Muhammad Ridhwan 6' (pen.), 13' 13'; Hamizan Hamzah 54'; Sufi Amar Zul Amin 62' (pen.), 67' 67'	Report	Nazrin Mazlan 8'; Muhammad Nur Hakim 85' (pen.)	Stadium: Rhino Arena Kelab Sultan Sulaiman; Attendance: 150; Referee: Ahmad Zuhadi Dzulkifli

==== Matchweek 5 ====
24 August 2024	Semantan Troopers	7–2	Selayang City	Temerloh
16:45 UTC+8	Ikhmal Zamri 4', 15', 74'; Fadeli Idris 5'; Amirul Safri 54'; Ammar Fitri 60'; Amirturahman 81'	Report	Hidayat Basir 45+1', 71'	Stadium: Temerloh Mini Stadium; Attendance: 149; Referee: Muhammad Almi Bin Abdullah (Abon)

24 August 2024	Kampong Ku	3–3	MAHSA United	Kampung Baru
16:45 UTC+8	Farhan Ab Hamid 58'; Ridhwan Johan 76'; K. Darwinrajoo 82'	Report	Amir Hakimi 21'; Naufal Al-Hakim 80'; Haziq Haiqal 90'	Stadium: Jalan Raja Muda Abdul Aziz Mini Stadium; Attendance: 150; Referee: Ahmad Nawawi Amir

24 August 2024	NBK Empire	0–1	AAK Ultimate	Kajang
16:45 UTC+8		Report	Faris Abdul Razak 90'	Stadium: Azman Hashim Sports Arena, UKM; Attendance: 50; Referee: Zulkarnian Zakaria

==== Matchweek 6 ====
7 September 2024	AAK Ultimate	11–0	Selayang City	Shah Alam
16:45 UTC+8	Fa'es Hafize 2', 32', 63', 70'; Shukor Azmi 14'; Faris Razak 17'; Shazril Uzair 30'; Hafizie Erwinshah 45+1', 80', 82'; Azmi Muslim 90'	Report		Stadium: Seksyen 4 Shah Alam Football Field; Attendance: 30; Referee: Mohamad Afif Bin Mohd Noor

7 September 2024	MAHSA United	1–3	NBK Empire	Jenjarom
16:45 UTC+8	Naufal Al Hakim 45'	Report	Afif Izzuddin 7'; Faris Manap 45+1'; Aidil Azman 65'	Stadium: MAHSA University Mini Stadium; Attendance: 100; Referee: Amirol Rosdi

7 September 2024	Semantan Troopers	2–2	Kampong Ku	Temerloh
16:45 UTC+8	Azimudin Ibrahim 60'; M. Lingeswaran 80'	Report	Mohd Azizi Hamid 43', 73'	Stadium: Temerloh Mini Stadium; Attendance: 181; Referee: Muhammad Almi bin Abdullah

==== Matchweek 7 ====
14 September 2024	NBK Empire	1–1	Selayang City	Kuala Lumpur
16:45 UTC+8	Azman Othman 22'	Report	Muhammad Hadzirun 40'	Stadium: Sayyidina Hamzah Stadium, IIUM; Attendance: 30; Referee: Muhammad Afiq Bin Mohd Roslibe

14 September 2024	MAHSA United	2–3	Semantan Troopers	Jenjarom
16:45 UTC+8	Fehriz Hakim 81'; Soffey Zarul Zackwan 81' (pen.)	Report	Helmi Ikhmal 17'; Naufal Al-Hakim 40'(o.g.); Zulhisyam Zulkifli 69'	Stadium: MAHSA University Mini Stadium; Attendance: 100; Referee: Ahmad Nawawi Amir

14 September 2024	Kampong Ku	2–1	AAK Ultimate	Kampung Baru
16:45 UTC+8	Ridhwan Johan 66' (pen.); Khairul Naim Mahyuddin 90'	Report	Fa’es Hafize 45'	Stadium: Jalan Raja Muda Abdul Aziz Mini Stadium; Attendance: 150; Referee: Jubik Andangon

==== Matchweek 8 ====
21 September 2024	Semantan Troopers	2–1	NBK Empire	Temerloh
16:45 UTC+8	Fariq Sahan 40'; Azimudin Ibrahim 47'	Report	Darwisy Hakim 71'	Stadium: Temerloh Mini Stadium; Attendance: 151; Referee: Mohd Faizal Jaini

21 September 2024	Kampong Ku	2–0	Selayang City	Kampung Baru
16:45 UTC+8	Khairul Naim 26'; Hamizan Hamzah 67'	Report		Stadium: Jalan Raja Muda Abdul Aziz Mini Stadium; Attendance: 100; Referee: Anselm Anak Enterang

21 September 2024	AAK Ultimate	3–0	MAHSA United	Petaling Jaya
16:45 UTC+8	Fa'es Hafize 18', 22'; Azrin Aduka 88'	Report		Stadium: Persada PLUS Mini Stadium; Attendance: 60; Referee: Amirol Rosdi

==== Matchweek 9 ====
5 October 2024	NBK Empire	1–5	Kampong Ku	Kuala Lumpur
16:45 UTC+8	Faris Manaf 45'	Report	Aliff Izwan Razak 2'; Farhan Abdul Hamid 43'; Azizie Hamid 72'; Sufi Amar 74'; Al-Amin Abdullah 78'	Stadium: Sayyidina Hamzah Stadium, IIUM; Attendance: 40; Referee: Mohd Hafizuan Bin Mohd Khair

5 October 2024	Semantan Troopers	0–4	AAK Ultimate	Temerloh
16:45 UTC+8		Report	Fa'es Hafize 8', 45'; Hafizie Erwinshah 11'; Azmi Muslim 35'	Stadium: Temerloh Mini Stadium; Attendance: 124; Referee: Kishandharan Gopal

6 October 2024	Selayang City	0–2	MAHSA United	Selayang
16:45 UTC+8		Report	Danish Ameer syauqi 52'; Haziq Haiqal 90+2'	Stadium: Selayang Stadium; Attendance: 100; Referee: Muhammad Faruq Bin Omar

==== Matchweek 10 ====
12 October 2024	MAHSA United	1–4	Kampong Ku	Jenjarom
16:45 UTC+8	Hisyamuddin Rozelan 90'	Report	Azizi Hamid 13'; Aliff Izwan Razak 56'; Farhan Abdul Hamid 73', 80'	Stadium: MAHSA University Mini Stadium; Attendance: 100; Referee: Amirul Izzat Bin Rusli

12 October 2024	AAK Ultimate	3–0	NBK Empire	Petaling Jaya
16:45 UTC+8		Report		Stadium: Persada PLUS Mini Stadium; Attendance: 30; Referee: Mohd Hafiz Zharif bin Ahmad Jafri

19 October 2024	Selayang City	0–3	Semantan Troopers	Rawang
16:45 UTC+8		Report		Stadium: Taman Kanching Mini Stadium

=== Zone 3 (south/Putrajaya) ===
Pos	Team	Pld	W	D	L	GF	GA	GD	Pts	Promotion or qualification
1	SAMB	10	8	1	1	29	8	+21	25	Advance to Knockout Round
2	MP Port Dickson	10	5	2	3	14	12	+2	17	Advance to Knockout Round
3	SJ Virtuosos	10	4	4	2	29	10	+19	16	Advance to Knockout Round
4	BR United	10	3	4	3	23	11	+12	13	
5	JAKIM	10	4	1	5	16	20	−4	13	
6	Real Mambau	10	0	0	10	6	56	−50	0	

Updated to match(es) played on 12 October 2024. Source: FAM-CMS

=== Fixtures and results ===
Home \ Away	JAK	SJV	MPD	REA	SAM	BRU
JAKIM		1–3	5–4	3–1	1–2	1–1
SJ Virtuosos	2–1		2–2	16–0	1–2	1–1
MP Port Dickson	1–2	1–0		1–0	0–1	1–1
Real Mambau	1–2	0–3	1–2		0–6	0–10
SAMB	4–0	2–2	0–1	7–1		2–1
BR United	1–0	0–0	0–1	7–2	1–3	

Updated to match(es) played on 12 October 2024. Source: FAM-CMS
Legend: Blue = home team win; Yellow = draw; Red = away team win.
For upcoming matches, an "a" indicates there is an article about the rivalry between the two participants.

=== Fixtures and results ===
==== Matchweek 1 ====
20 July 2024	MP Port Dickson	1–0	SJ Virtuosos	Port Dickson
16:45 UTC+8	Fauzan 55'	Report		Stadium: Padang Merdeka; Attendance: 70; Referee: Mazilan Rozaimi

20 July 2024	SAMB	2–1	BR United	Melaka City
16:45 UTC+8	Zamree Jani 77'; Shamerul Abd Aziz 79'	Report	M. Terrence 52'	Stadium: Hang Tuah Stadium; Attendance: 1,000; Referee: Firdaus Dahlan

20 July 2024	JAKIM	3–1	Real Mambau	Kajang
16:45 UTC+8	Fakru Faiz 31'; Nor Saiful 55' (pen.); Azamuddin 76'	Report	'Izzul 44' (pen.)	Stadium: Azman Hashim Sports Arena, UKM; Attendance: 100; Referee: Mohd Hafiz Zharif

==== Matchweek 2 ====
27 July 2024	BR United	0–0	SJ Virtuosos	Sepang
16:45 UTC+8		Report		Stadium: Sepang Municipal Council Mini Stadium; Attendance: 30; Referee: Zam Azwan Khan Bin Rashid Khan

27 July 2024	Real Mambau	1–2	MP Port Dickson	Seremban
16:45 UTC+8	Luqman Hakim 57'	Report	Shahrul Azman 4', 15'	Stadium: UITM Seremban Football Field; Attendance: 100; Referee: Helbe Bin Mositing

27 July 2024	SAMB	4–0	JAKIM	Melaka City
16:45 UTC+8	Shamerul 19' (pen.) 80'; Nazirul 41', 61'	Report		Stadium: Hang Tuah Stadium; Attendance: 2,000; Referee: Izwan Abdullah

==== Matchweek 3 ====
10 August 2024	BR United	1–0	JAKIM	Bandar Sri Sendayan
16:45 UTC+8	K. Kesavakumar 90+3'	Report		Stadium: Arena IRC Sendayan; Attendance: 20; Referee: Helbe Bin Mositing

10 August 2024	MP Port Dickson	0–1	SAMB	Port Dickson
16:45 UTC+8		Report	Aqil Hazwan 50'	Stadium: Padang Merdeka; Attendance: 70; Referee: Syafiq Taufik

10 August 2024	Real Mambau	0–3	SJ Virtuosos	Seremban
16:45 UTC+8		Report	Fazrul Fahriz 23'; Danial Hariz 62'; Zakwan Zamri 90'	Stadium: UiTM Seremban 3 Football Field; Attendance: 20; Referee: Mohamed Fahmi Ibrahim

==== Matchweek 4 ====
17 August 2024	JAKIM	5–4	MP Port Dickson	Kajang
16:45 UTC+8	Mohd Fakru Faiz 10', 18', 50', 53'; Lokman Hakim 78'	Report	Fauzan Fauzi 27'; Mohd Shahrul 45', 83' (pen.); Nurzaidi Bunari 90+1'	Stadium: Azman Hashim Sports Arena, UKM; Attendance: 93; Referee: Ahmad Nawawi Amir

17 August 2024	Real Mambau	0–10	BR United	Seremban
16:45 UTC+8		Report	M. Kalaiarasan 7', 14'; Thipanraj 17'; Nesamani Chettiar 24', 35', 67'; M. Thiyagu 33'; M. Terrence 71'; Leslee 76'; S. Sridhar 86'	Stadium: UiTM Seremban 3 Football Field; Attendance: 20; Referee: Muhammad Nasruddin B Muhammad Tamrin

18 August 2024	SJ Virtuosos	1–2	SAMB	Shah Alam
16:45 UTC+8	Amir Firdaus 34'	Report	Wan Zulfahmi 42'; Awangku Hamirullizam 63'	Stadium: UiTM Stadium; Attendance: 100; Referee: S. Logeswaran

==== Matchweek 5 ====
24 August 2024	SAMB	7–1	Real Mambau	Krubong
16:45 UTC+8	Ag Ku Hamirullizam 5'; Aqil Hazwan 25', 32'; Hakimie Helmy 44'; Shamerul Abd Aziz 47', 89'; Zamree Jani 72'	Report	Saiful Yusman 65'	Stadium: Hang Jebat Stadium; Attendance: 300; Referee: Zamzaidi Katimin

24 August 2024	SJ Virtuosos	2–1	JAKIM	Bukit Jelutong
16:45 UTC+8	Israff Zahir 16'; Zakwan Zamri 77'	Report	Kamarul Aidif Syazmel 75'	Stadium: Sime Darby Football Field; Attendance: 32; Referee: Faizal Talib

24 August 2024	MP Port Dickson	1–1	BR United	Port Dickson
16:45 UTC+8	Ahmad Daniel 82'	Report	Kalaiarasan Murugan 49'	Stadium: Padang Merdeka; Attendance: 70; Referee: Helbe Bin Mositing

==== Matchweek 6 ====
7 September 2024	SJ Virtuosos	2–2	MP Port Dickson	Bukit Jelutong
16:45 UTC+8	Asnan Awal 15'; Fazrul Fahriz 35'	Report	Nurzaidi Bunari 37'; Haziq Mohd Noh (o.g.) 6'	Stadium: Sime Darby Football Field; Attendance: 62; Referee: Mohd Atik Bin Kassim

7 September 2024	BR United	1–3	SAMB	Bandar Sri Sendayan
16:45 UTC+8	Praviin 22' (pen.)	Report	Shamerul Abd Aziz 33', 53'; Syafiq Abd Samad 66'	Stadium: Arena IRC Sendayan; Attendance: 30; Referee: Zam Azwan Khan

7 September 2024	Real Mambau	1–2	JAKIM	Seremban
16:45 UTC+8	Amirull Nashriq 45+4'	Report	Faris Syazwan 7'; Badrul Amin 31'	Stadium: UiTM Seremban 3 Football Field; Attendance: 50; Referee: Latiffi Zahrom

==== Matchweek 7 ====
14 September 2024	SJ Virtuosos	1–1	BR United	Bukit Jelutong
16:45 UTC+8	Faris Hafiz Azhar 52'	Report	M. Terrence 77'	Stadium: Sime Darby Football Field; Attendance: 51; Referee: Muhammad Arif Bin Ismail

14 September 2024	MP Port Dickson	1–0	Real Mambau	Port Dickson
16:45 UTC+8	Ahmad Daniel 45+1'	Report		Stadium: Padang Merdeka; Attendance: 20; Referee: Mohamad Hafizi Mohd Nor

14 September 2024	JAKIM	1–2	SAMB	Kajang
16:45 UTC+8	Fakru Faiz 50'	Report	Aiman Adham 38'; Aqil Hazwan 51'	Stadium: Azman Hashim Sports Arena, UKM; Attendance: 100; Referee: Muhd Aizad Bin Damanhuri

==== Matchweek 8 ====
21 September 2024	SAMB	0–1	MP Port Dickson	Melaka City
16:45 UTC+8		Report	Ibrahim Suhaib 71'	Stadium: Hang Tuah Stadium; Attendance: 300; Referee: Izwan Abdullah

21 September 2024	JAKIM	1–1	BR United	Kajang
16:45 UTC+8	Azamuddin Ab Rasid 52'	Report	Megaraj Muniandy 23'	Stadium: Azman Hashim Sports Arena, UKM; Attendance: 112; Referee: Muhhammad Amieyrul Rizuan Bin Salleh

21 September 2024	SJ Virtuosos	16–0	Real Mambau	Bukit Jelutong
16:45 UTC+8	Eskandar Ismail 5', 27', 34'; Faris Hafiz Azhar 10', 18', 19', 23', 29', 40', 42', 45', 65'; Lukhman Noor Hakim 11'; Zakwan Zamri 33', 41'; Nazrien Faizal Azmi 64' (pen.)	Report		Stadium: Sime Darby Football Field; Referee: Mohd Hafizuan Bin Mohd Khair

==== Matchweek 9 ====
5 October 2024	MP Port Dickson	1–2	JAKIM	Port Dickson
16:45 UTC+8	Ibrahim Suhaib 73'	Report	Hafizi Shari 83', 88'	Stadium: Padang Merdeka; Attendance: 40; Referee: Latiffi Zahrom

5 October 2024	SAMB	2–2	SJ Virtuosos	Krubong
16:45 UTC+8	Shamerul Abd Aziz 47'; W. M. Aiman Adham 57'	Report	Meer Adam Shah 23'; Eskandar Ismail 55'	Stadium: Hang Jebat Stadium; Attendance: 250; Referee: Syed Fazeel Shah Bin Syed Anwar Shah

6 October 2024	BR United	7–2	Real Mambau	Bandar Sri Sendayan
16:45 UTC+8	M. Thiyagu 3', 31'; K. Ravindran 8'; K.Kesavakumar 17'; M. Megaraj 64'; Shyamierul Razmee 66'; Praviin 76'	Report	Mohd Fareez Abd Samah 46', 77'	Stadium: Arena IRC Sendayan; Attendance: 30; Referee: Mohammad Syafiq Mohd Taufik

==== Matchweek 10 ====
12 October 2024	Real Mambau	0–6	SAMB	Seremban
16:45 UTC+8		Report	Aqil Hazwan 7'; Iskandar Hanapiah 18' (pen.); Rais Rahim 26'; Zamree Jani 75', 83', 89'	Stadium: UiTM Seremban 3 Football Field; Attendance: 20; Referee: Izzul Fikri Kamaruzaman

12 October 2024	JAKIM	1–3	SJ Virtuosos	Kajang
16:45 UTC+8	Ranngi Oftawan 14'	Report	Ibrahim Syaihul 49'; Amir Firdaus 50'; Faris Hafiz Azhar 82'	Stadium: Azman Hashim Sports Arena, UKM; Attendance: 100; Referee: Dinesh A/L Balan

12 October 2024	BR United	0–1	MP Port Dickson	Bandar Sri Sendayan
16:45 UTC+8		Report	Zulhelmi Roslan 9'	Stadium: Arena IRC Sendayan; Attendance: 100; Referee: Helbe Bin Mositing

== Knockout round ==
=== Bracket ===
Quarter-finals
3C	SJ Virtuosos	0	1	1
1A	Kelantan WTS	6	1	7
3B	Semantan Troopers	1	1	2
1C	SAMB	0	0	0
2C	MP Port Dickson	1	2	3
1B	AAK Ultimate	1	0	1
2A	Guar Syed Alwi	2	0	2 (5)
2B	Kampong Ku	1	1	2 (3)

Semi-finals
Kelantan WTS	6	4	10
Semantan Troopers	0	0	0
MP Port Dickson	0	0	0
Guar Syed Alwi	1	2	3

Final
Kelantan WTS	2 (2)
Guar Syed Alwi	2 (4)

=== Quarter-finals ===
Team 1	Agg.	Team 2	1st leg	2nd leg
SJ Virtuosos	1–7	Kelantan WTS	0–6	1–1
MP Port Dickson	3–1	AAK Ultimate	1–1	0–2
Semantan Troopers	2–0	SAMB	1–0	1–0
Guar Syed Alwi	2–2	Kampong Ku	2–1	0–1

26 October 2024
16:45 UTC+8

SJ Virtuosos	0–6	Kelantan WTS
	Report	Fakhrul Zaman 32', 52'; Khairul Rizam 37'; Zaharulnizam 48'; Faizwan Abdullah 90+2'; Qhaidir Abdullah 90+4'

Azman Hashim Sports Arena, UKM Kajang
Attendance: 140
Referee: Zulkarnian Zakaria
2 November 2024
16:15 UTC+8

Kelantan WTS	1–1	SJ Virtuosos
Khairul Rizam 80' (pen.)	Report	Amir Firdaus 38'

WTS Football Field, Tendong Pasir Mas
Attendance: 150
Referee: Muhammad Ariff Bin Afandi

"Kelantan WTS won 7–1 on aggregate."

26 October 2024
16:45 UTC+8

MP Port Dickson	1–1	AAK Ultimate
Ibrahim Suhaib 81'	Report	Fa'es Hafize 6'

Padang Merdeka Port Dickson, Port Dickson
Attendance: 60
Referee: Muhammad Zakiran Zammuri
2 November 2024
16:15 UTC+8

AAK Ultimate	0–2	MP Port Dickson
	Report	Ibrahim Suhaib 9'; Naqiuddin Amran 18'

Persada PLUS Mini Stadium, Petaling Jaya
Attendance: 100
Referee: Mohd Hafiz Zharif Bin Ahmad Jafri

"MP Port Dickson won 3–1 on aggregate."

26 October 2024
16:45 UTC+8

Semantan Troopers	1–0	SAMB
Sathish B Nair 38'	Report

Temerloh Mini Stadium , Temerloh
Attendance: 145
Referee: Syafiq Zolkefli
2 November 2024
16:15 UTC+8

SAMB	0–1	Semantan Troopers
	Report	Ikhmal Roslan 31' (o.g.)

Hang Tuah Stadium, Melaka City
Attendance: 1,000
Referee: Izwan Abdullah

"Semantan Troopers won 2–0 on aggregate."

26 October 2024
20:45 UTC+8

Guar Syed Alwi	2–1	Kampong Ku
Hazwan Hassan 60'; Akmal Afizan 66'	Report	Ridhwan Johan 69'

Tuanku Syed Putra Stadium, Kangar
Attendance: 433
Referee: Mohamad Izzat Izaini Ali
2 November 2024
16:15 UTC+8

Kampong Ku	1–0	Guar Syed Alwi
Ridhwan Johan 49' (pen.)	Report
Penalties
Azizi (penalty missed); Al-Amin (penalty scored); Danniel (penalty scored); Sufi (penalty scored)	3–5	(penalty scored) Faizal; (penalty scored) Haziq; (penalty scored) Hazwan; (penalty scored) Nashrul; (penalty scored) Hafiz

Kuala Lumpur Stadium, Cheras, Kuala Lumpur
Attendance: 500
Referee: Mohd Atik Kassim

"Guar Syed Alwi won on penalty shoot-out 5–3."

=== Semi-finals ===
Team 1	Agg.	Team 2	1st leg	2nd leg
Kelantan WTS	10–0	Semantan Troopers	6–0	4–0
MP Port Dickson	0–3	Guar Syed Alwi	0–1	0–2

9 November 2024
16:45 UTC+8

Kelantan WTS	6–0	Semantan Troopers
Ammar Fitri 17'; Faizwan Abdullah 37', 77', 84'; Shafiq Al-Hafiz 59'; Khairul Rizam 75'	Report

WTS Football Field, Tendong Pasir Mas
Attendance: 250
Referee: Muhammad Ariff Bin Afandi
16 November 2024
16:15 UTC+8

Semantan Troopers	0–4	Kelantan WTS
	Report	Faizwan Abdullah; Khairul Rizam 70'

Temerloh Mini Stadium, Temerloh
Attendance: 261
Referee: Saifuddin Abu Bakar

"Kelantan WTS won 10–0 on aggregate."

9 November 2024
16:45 UTC+8

MP Port Dickson	0–1	Guar Syed Alwi
	Report	Faizal Kadir 76'

Padang Merdeka, Port Dickson
Attendance: 80
Referee: Mohammad Hafizi Mohd Nor Hazalin
16 November 2024
20:45 UTC+8

Guar Syed Alwi	2–0	MP Port Dickson
Nor Mohd Hafizz 84'; Azrizan Ahmad 90+1'	Report

Tuanku Syed Putra Stadium, Kangar
Attendance: 676
Referee: Suhaizi Shukri

"Guar Syed Alwi won 3–0 on aggregate."

== Final ==
6 December 2024
20:45 (MST)

Kelantan WTS	2–2 (a.e.t.)	Guar Syed Alwi
Fakhrul Zaman 18'; Arif Roslan 73' (o.g.)	Report	Faizal Kadir 32' (pen.); Muhaimin Mohd Shahab 89'
Penalties
Nasharizam (penalty scored); Shafiq (penalty missed); Zaharulnizam (penalty missed); Shahrul Hakim (penalty scored)	2–4	(penalty scored) Haziq Mu'iz; (penalty scored) Faizal; (penalty scored) Azrizan; (penalty scored) Hafizz

UiTM Stadium, Shah Alam
Attendance: 1,017
Referee: Zulkarnian Zakaria

== Winners ==
Champions of 2024–25 Malaysia A2 Amateur League

Guar Syed Alwi
First Title

== Season statistics ==
=== Top goalscorers ===
As of 6 December 2024

Rank	Player	Team	Goals
1	(Malaysia) Fa’es Hafize	AAK Ultimate	14
2	(Malaysia) Faizwan Abdullah	WTS	12
3	(Malaysia) Faris Hafiz Azhar	SJ Virtuosos	11
4	(Malaysia) Muhammad Ridhwan	Kampong Ku	8
4	(Malaysia) Shamerul Abd Aziz	SAMB	8
6	(Malaysia) Khairul Rizam	WTS	7
7	(Malaysia) Fakru Faiz	JAKIM	6
7	(Malaysia) Muhammad Farhan Abdul Hamid	Kampong Ku	6
9	(Malaysia) Mohd Ikmal Faiz Azmi	Guar Syed Alwi	5
9	(Malaysia) Fakhrul Zaman	WTS	5
9	(Malaysia) Aqil Hazwan	SAMB	5
9	(Malaysia) Zamree Jani	SAMB	5
9	(Malaysia) Mohammad Helmi Ikhmal Zamri	Semantan Troopers	5

=== Own goals ===
As of 14 September 2024

Rank	Player	Team	Against	Date	Goal
1	(Malaysia) Shahir Adzha	Selayang City	Kampong Ku	10 August 2024	1
1	(Malaysia) Haziq Mohd Noh	SJ Virtuosos	MP Port Dickson	7 September 2024	1
1	(Malaysia) Sufyan Suhaimi	Pencinta Setia	WTS	14 September 2024	1
1	(Malaysia) Naufal Al-Hakim	MAHSA United	Semantan Troopers	14 September 2024	1

=== Hat-tricks ===
As of 12 October 2024

Player	For	Against	Result	Date
(Malaysia) Mohd Fakru Faiz^{4}	JAKIM	MP Port Dickson	5–4 (H)	17 August 2024
(Malaysia) Nesamani Chettiar	BR United	Real Mambau	0–10 (A)	17 August 2024
(Malaysia) Ikhmal Zamri	Semantan Troopers	Selayang City	7–2 (H)	24 August 2024
(Malaysia) Fa'es Hafize^{4}	AAK Ultimate	Selayang City	11–0 (H)	7 September 2024
(Malaysia) Hafizie Erwinshah	AAK Ultimate	Selayang City	11–0 (H)	7 September 2024
(Malaysia) Eskandar Ismail	SJ Virtuosos	Real Mambau	16–0 (H)	21 September 2024
(Malaysia) Faris Hafiz Azhar^{9}	SJ Virtuosos	Real Mambau	16–0 (H)	21 September 2024
(Malaysia) Zamree Jani	SAMB	Real Mambau	0–6 (H)	12 October 2024

Notes

^{4} Player scored 4 goals
^{5} Player scored 5 goals
^{9} Player scored 9 goals
(H) – Home team
(A) – Away team

== See also ==
- 2024 Piala Sumbangsih
- 2024–25 Malaysia A1 Semi-Pro League
- 2024–25 Malaysia A3 Community League
- 2024 Malaysia FA Cup
- 2024–25 Malaysia Cup
