= Real Mambau F.C. =

Malaysian football club

Real Mambau
- Full name: Kelab Bolasepak Real Mambau
- Nickname(s): The Mighty Sailors
- Short name: RMFC
- Founded: 2022; 3 years ago
- Ground: UITM Seremban Football Field
- Capacity: 600
- Head coach: Al-Hasrizal Al-Mustafi
- League: Malaysia A3 Community League
- 2024–25: Malaysia A2 Amateur League, relegated

Real Mambau Football Club, simply known as Real Mambau, is a Malaysian football club based in Mambau, Seremban, Negeri Sembilan. It plays in the fourth tier of the Malaysian football league system, the Malaysia A3 Community League.

== History ==
Real Mambau joined competitions organised by the Negeri Sembilan Football Association. In 2023 they finished in third place. This achievement marked a significant milestone for the club, reflecting its ambition to progress within the Malaysian football league system.

In the 2024–25 Malaysia A2 Amateur League, Real Mambau FC faced significant challenges. The team suffered heavy defeats, including 16–0 to SJ Virtuosos F.C. on September 21, and 0–10 to BR United on August 17. These results contributed to their last-place finish in the South Zone.

== Technical staff (2024) ==
- Team manager: Sahdan bin Shaherom
- Head coach: Al-Hasrizal Al-Mustafi
- Assistant coach: Anuar Sukiman
- Physio: Nasrin Eman Mazlan
- Team official: Ridhwan Aiman
- Media officer: Faiq Rashid
- Kitman: Daniel Razmi

== Players (2024) ==
Note: Flags indicate national team as defined under FIFA eligibility rules; some limited exceptions apply. Players may hold more than one non-FIFA nationality.

| No. | Pos. | Nation | Player |
|---|---|---|---|
| 1 | GK | MAS | Azri Haikal Halim |
| 3 | DF | MAS | Luqman Hakim Baharin |
| 4 | MF | MAS | Arif Fikri Jamil |
| 5 | MF | MAS | Izham Al-Hafiz Mohamad |
| 6 | DF | MAS | Alif Yusof |
| 7 | MF | MAS | Md Shahrul Asmadin |
| 8 | MF | MAS | Mohamad Norazizi Khalid |
| 9 | FW | MAS | Hamizan Mohd Nor |
| 10 | MF | MAS | Muhammad 'Izzul Azmi |
| 11 | MF | MAS | Amirull Nashriq Zamri |
| 14 | MF | MAS | Afiq Umar Darwisy |
| 15 | MF | MAS | Mohamad Razman Razuki |
| 16 | MF | MAS | Azmil Azran Abd Rahman |
| 17 | MF | MAS | Ilhan Hafiz Fazli |

| No. | Pos. | Nation | Player |
|---|---|---|---|
| 18 | GK | MAS | Muhammad Firdaus Zulkifli |
| 19 | FW | MAS | Muhammad Danish Fauzan |
| 20 | DF | MAS | Azli Azrul Ahmad Kamel |
| 21 | DF | MAS | Akmal Hakiem Ibrahim |
| 22 | FW | MAS | Nik Ezwan Nik Tajul Ariff |
| 23 | DF | MAS | Aiman Ahmad Nizam |
| 24 | DF | MAS | Iman Zaim Muhammad Nor |
| 25 | MF | MAS | Ridhwan Dul Fakar |
| 26 | MF | MAS | Zahirul Fadlin Yusoff |
| 27 | MF | MAS | Huzaimi Mokhtar |
| 28 | MF | MAS | Saiful Yusman Mohamad Nor |
| 29 | FW | MAS | Amirul Ashrafiq Hanifah |
| 30 | DF | MAS | Amir Shaifulniza Johan |

== Season by season record ==
| Season | Division | Position | Malaysia Cup | Malaysian FA Cup | Malaysian Charity Shield | Regional | Top scorer (all competitions) |
|---|---|---|---|---|---|---|---|
| 2023 | Division 5/A3 League | Third place | DNQ | DNQ | – | – | |
| 2024–25 | Division 4/A2 League | 6th place (South Zone) | DNQ | DNQ | – | – | (Malaysia) Mohd Fareez Abd Samah (2 goals) |

| Champions | Runners-up | Third place | Promoted | Relegated |

== Honours ==
=== Domestic competitions ===
==== League ====
- Division 5/A-Ligue Nismilan

(bronze) Third place (1): 2023
