= Negeri Sembilan Football Association =

Malaysian sports association

Negeri Sembilan FA
- Abbreviation: NSFA, PBNS
- Formation: 1923; 103 years ago
- Legal status: Association
- Purpose: Football association
- Headquarters: Wisma PBNS, Medan Rahang, Seremban
- Location: Negeri Sembilan
- Fields: Sports
- President: YTM Tunku Syed Razman Bin Tunku Syed 'Idrus al-Qadri
- Deputy president: YB Dato' Dr. Razali Bin Ab Malik
- Vice president: YB Dato' Hj. Mohamad Taufek Bin Abd Ghani; YBHG Dato' Masri Bin Razali; Saaran Nadarajah; YB Tuan Haji Mustapha Bin Nagoor

Negeri Sembilan Football Association (NSFA) (Malay: Persatuan Bola Sepak Negeri Sembilan (PBNS)), commonly referred to as PBNS, is a governing body of football in Negeri Sembilan. This association is also the subsidiary owner of Negeri Sembilan FC. PBNS is an association registered with the Office of the Sports Commissioner of Malaysia and one of the affiliates of the Football Association of Malaysia (FAM). PBNS is currently led by Tunku Syed Razman bin Tunku Syed Idrus Al-Qadri, who is also the Tunku Besar of Tampin.

PBNS is also a partner of the Malaysia Football League (MFL). PBNS focuses on district football development programs, coaching courses, referee development, futsal, beach soccer, as well as activities at the grassroots level. In addition, PBNS is responsible for the organisation of the local leagues as a platform for the Youth Cup (U19) and President Cup (U21).

== History ==
The association was established in 1923. According to an interview with Austin Senevirathe, a match between PBNS and Singapore for Malaya Cup marked the NSFA foundation in that particular year. In 1927, the PBNS started organizing league matches. Among the trophies at that time were the Annex Shield, the British Resident's Cup and the Hose Cup. The earliest football clubs that existed and competed in the league were Negri Sembilan Chinese "A", Negri Sembilan Club, Port Dickson Recreation Club, Sungei Ujong Club, Negri Sembilan Chinese "B" and St. Paul's Old Boys Association. In 1982, Tan Sri Dato' Seri Utama Mohd Isa bin Dato' Haji Abdul Samad was appointed president of the Negeri Sembilan Football Association (PBNS), as well as the Menteri Besar of Negeri Sembilan.

In March 2004, Datuk Seri Mohamad Hasan was appointed as the president of the Negeri Sembilan Football Association. He also held the position as the 10th Menteri Besar of Negeri Sembilan, replacing Isa Samad. Hasan was the first Menteri Besar who has been a local football player and became the president of the association. He played with clubs from Kuala Lumpur and Selangor. He was banned after receiving a red card in a match between NS Malays and NS Indians in 1977. On 10 September 2018, Tunku Besar of Tampin, Tunku Syed Razman Tunku Syed Idrus Al-Qadri was elected as the new president of the Negeri Sembilan Football Association, being unopposed at the 86th PBNS Congress.

== Management ==
PBNS management is elected through the PBNS Congress. The following are the PBNS Executive committee members for the term 2022–2025.

As of 5 May 2024

Position	Name
President	(Malaysia) YTM Tunku Syed Razman Bin Tunku Syed 'Idrus al-Qadri
Deputy president	(Malaysia) YB Dato' Mohd Zafir Bin Ibrahim
Vice presidents	(Malaysia) YB Dato' Hj. Mohamad Taufek Bin Abd Ghani
Vice presidents	(Malaysia) YB Tuan Haji Mustapha Bin Nagoor
Vice presidents	(Malaysia) YBHG Dato' Masri Bin Razali
Vice presidents	(Malaysia) Saaran Nadarajah
Honorary secretary	(Malaysia) Tuan Haji Abdul Malek Haji Hassan
Executive secretary	(Malaysia) YB Tuan Haji Mohd Khidir Bin Majid
Treasurer	(Malaysia) Michael Ong Teik Loon
Members	(Malaysia) Tuan Hj. Hamdan Bin Hj. Othman
Members	(Malaysia) Kalidasan a/l Sinuam Sinniah
Members	(Malaysia) Jamsari Bin Mohamad
Members	(Malaysia) Kamarudin Bin Ibrahim
Members	(Malaysia) Tuan Hj. Bachik Bin Osman
Members	(Malaysia) Lai Hein Sip
Members	(Malaysia) Dana Palan a/l V.K. Karuniam
Members	(Malaysia) Tuan Hj. Azmi Bin Hj. Selamat

== President list ==
Name	From	To
Wan Salaidin Wan Ismail	1969	1978
Tan Sri Rais Yatim	1978	1982
Tan Sri Mohd Isa Abdul Samad	1982	2004
Datuk Seri Mohamad Haji Hassan	2004	2018
Tunku Syed Razman Tunku Syed Idrus	2018	Present

== Office and facilities ==
PBNS office is located at Wisma PBNS, Medan Rahang, Seremban. There are several facilities to undergo training, which are also opened for the public. Among them is the PBNS Synthetic Field, which was completed in 2018. This synthetic field is also equipped with floodlight.

In addition to the football facilities, PBNS also has the Kapten GYM to provide the gym equipment for the players, staff and the general public. The association also has a PBNS Concept Store.

== Competitions ==
The Negeri Sembilan Football Association has organised the following competitions:

- Negeri Sembilan Premier League
- Seremban Business League
- Seremban Senior League
- Seremban Night League
- Tuanku Cup
- Thivy Jaya Cup
- YAB Menteri Besar Negeri Sembilan Cup
- Negeri Sembilan Youth League U-23
- Negeri Sembilan Youth League U-20
- Negeri Sembilan Youth League U-18
- Negeri Sembilan Youth League U-17
- Negeri Sembilan Youth League U-15
- Grassroot Unity Cup U-12
- Grassroot Unity Cup U-10
- Grassroot Unity Cup U-8

== Affiliations ==
All-time clubs in the league competitions affiliated to the PBNS include:

- Negeri Sembilan FC
- Bunga Raya F.C.
- PUSEN Hornet F.C.
- Teck Hin F.C.
- NS Forces Warriors F.C.
- Bunga Raya United F.C.
- Real Mambau F.C.
- MPPD F.C.
- SAINS F.C.
- NS Betaria F.C.
- Nilai City S.C.
- Negeri Sembilan United F.C. (futsal)

=== District associations ===
There are 7 district football association affiliated to the NSFA:

- Jelebu DFA
- Jempol DFA
- Kuala Pilah DFA
- Port Dickson DFA
- Rembau DFA
- Seremban DFA
- Tampin DFA

=== Women's football ===
- Negeri Sembilan Women's FC
