= Putrajaya Football Association =

Malaysian football association

Putrajaya Football Association Persatuan Bola Sepak Putrajaya (PjFA)
- Founded: 2003; 23 years ago
- Purpose: Football association
- Location: Federal Territories of Malaysia, Putrajaya, Malaysia
- President: Datuk Ahmad Faisal Abdul Karim

Putrajaya Football Association (PjFA) (Malay: ms:Persatuan Bola Sepak Putrajaya) is the governing body of football for the Federal Territories of Putrajaya, Malaysia.

== Association management ==
Positions	Name
President	(Malaysia) Datuk Ahmad Faisal Abdul Karim
General secretary	(Malaysia) Muhamad Saiful Sulaiman

== Former presidents ==
Name	Period
(Malaysia) Tengku Adnan Tengku Mansor	2003–2014
(Malaysia) Mohd Hisamudin Yahaya	2014–2020

== Competitions ==
- Piala Datuk Seri Tengku Adnan Tengku Mansor
- Putrajaya A3 Community League

== Affiliations ==
Clubs in the top league competitions affiliated to the Putrajaya Football Association include:

- Immigration F.C.
- SJ Virtuosos F.C.
- JAKIM FC
- Putrajaya United F.C.

== See also ==
- Football Association of Malaysia
- Kuala Lumpur Football Association
- Malaysia A3 Community League
- History of Malaysian football
