= Pencinta Setia F.C. =

Malaysian football club

Pencinta Setia
- Full name: Pencinta Setia Football Club
- Short name: PSFC
- Founded: 2016; 9 years ago
- Ground: Matang Football Field
- Capacity: 900
- President: Mohd Kamaruddin Abu Bakar
- Head coach: Muhammad Suhaimi Bin Idris
- League: Malaysia A3 Community League
- 2024–25: Malaysia A2 Amateur League, relegated

Pencinta Setia Football Club is a Malaysian football club based in Taiping, Matang, Perak. The club has steadily progressed through the Malaysian football league system and currently competes in the Malaysia A3 Community League.

== History ==
Founded in 2016, Pencinta Setia FC began its journey by participating in local competitions around Perak. The club competed in the PBDLMS M5 League, organized by the Persatuan Bolasepak Daerah Larut Matang & Selama. Their consistent performances led to their promotion to the Malaysia A2 Amateur League for the 2024–25 season.

Pencinta Setia FC's progression from local leagues to the national stage exemplifies their dedication to developing football talent and competing at higher levels within Malaysian football.

== Players (2024) ==
Note: Flags indicate national team as defined under FIFA eligibility rules; some limited exceptions apply. Players may hold more than one non-FIFA nationality.

No.	Pos.	Nation	Player
1	GK	MAS	Muhamad Syahiran
4	DF	MAS	Mohamad Azzuan Alias
5	MF	MAS	Mohammad Fitri Danial
6	DF	MAS	Muhammad Sufyan Suhaimi
7	FW	MAS	Mohamad Hijjaz Hakimi
10	FW	MAS	Abdul Aziz Abd Razak
11	FW	MAS	Abdul Fatah Abd Razak
12	DF	MAS	Muhammad Zahin Irfan
13	MF	MAS	Muhamad Hafiz Abdul Rahim
14	MF	MAS	Danial Haikal Khairul Azmi
16	MF	MAS	Muhammad Danial Fitri
17	MF	MAS	Mohamad Norhazim Hashimi
18	MF	MAS	Mohd Fariz Anuar

No.	Pos.	Nation	Player
19	MF	MAS	Muhammad Iruan Khalid
20	MF	MAS	Ahmad Azwal Ahmad Fauzi
21	MF	MAS	Muhamad Jailani Nordin
22	MF	MAS	Muhammad Riduan Ahmad Nazari
23	MF	MAS	Ahmad Azril Ahmad Fauzi
24	DF	MAS	Wiranto Akbar Sayuti
25	FW	MAS	Muhammad Daniel Aqil
29	GK	MAS	Adib Adham Hamran
31	MF	MAS	Muhammad Alif Danial
32	DF	MAS	Muhammad Amiruddin Zainal Abidin
33	DF	MAS	Rahmat Rahim
99	GK	MAS	Muhammad Faris Wadihan

== Team officials (2024) ==
- Team manager: Mohammad Hazuan Hizamil Bin Mohd Sukur
- Head coach: Muhammad Suhaimi Bin Idris
- Assistant coaches: Syed Nasran Hisham Bin Syed Din, Ahmad Shahir Bin Ahmad Rafie, Mohamad Zulkifli Bin Yahya
- Physiotherapists: Muhamad Khairullah Bin Kamaruddin, Mohd Razif Bin Mohd Arshad
- Media officer: Muhammad Addib Bin Che Hasnan
- Kitmen: Muhammad Haziq Bin Abdul Rahaman, Muhammad Najib Bin Zainal

== Honours ==
=== League ===
- Kuala Kangsar Premier League

(gold) Winners (1): 2018
