= DD Social League =

- Founded: 2014; 12 years ago
- Country: Malaysia
- Confederation: AFC
- Divisions: Division 1
- Number of clubs: 24; Division 1
- Level on pyramid: 4
- Feeder to: Malaysia M4 League
- Promotion to: Malaysia M3 League
- Relegation to: KL Social League
- Domestic cup: DD Social League FA Cup
- Current champions: KL Cop (1st titles)
- Website: Official Website
- Current: 2019 DD Social League

DD Social League is a social football league held in Cheras, Malaysia. The League is a Malaysian football league at level 4 of the Malaysian football league system.

The season began in September 2018. The teams were divided into four groups, each containing six teams. The group leaders and runners-up teams in the groups after six matches qualified to the quarterfinals.

== History ==
The league has been established since 2014 albeit undergoes multiple iteration of structures until its current structure took place. Starting from 2018, this league will have promotion to the newly established fourth-tier league called Malaysia M4 League.

== 2018 teams ==
=== Group A ===
- Pranktor
- Braboasar
- Kickers
- Dassad Capitol
- Pewaris
- DD

=== Group B ===
- Kara
- Bukit Kiara
- Alma
- KL Cops
- RAJD
- Celtico

=== Group C ===
- KVC
- Sungai Sook
- Merapok
- SS
- TMKL
- SIP

=== Group D ===
- Gabungan
- Real Melati
- Arslan
- Senu
- Tanjung
- SBI

== Champions ==
No.	Season	Champions	Runners-up	Score in final
1	2018	KL Cops	RAJD	3–2
