= NBK Empire F.C. =

Malaysian football club

NBK Empire
- Full name: NBK Empire Football Club
- Short name: NBK
- Founded: 2022; 3 years ago
- Ground: MAHSA University Mini Stadium
- Capacity: 1,000
- Head coach: Noor Ismadi Ismail
- League: Malaysia A3 Community League
- 2024–25: Malaysia A2 Amateur League, relegated

NBK Empire Football Club is a Malaysian football club based in Jenjarom, Kuala Langat District, Selangor. It plays in the third tier of the Malaysian football league system, the Malaysia A3 Community League.

== History ==
Founded in 2022, NBK Empire joined the Liga Mahsa-Kronos M5 and finished in 7th place. A year later, club joined the A-Ligue Champions League M5 and advanced to the final, thus being promoted to 2024–25 Malaysia A2 Amateur League.

== Players (2024) ==
Note: Flags indicate national team as defined under FIFA eligibility rules; some limited exceptions apply. Players may hold more than one non-FIFA nationality.

No.	Pos.	Nation	Player
1	GK	(Malaysia) MAS	Zahal Asis
2	DF	(Malaysia) MAS	Ahmad Shahrin Mohd
3	DF	(Malaysia) MAS	Muhammad Azhar Arif
4	DF	(Malaysia) MAS	Wan Muhammad Solahuddin
5	DF	(Malaysia) MAS	Ahmad Ambrol Zainudin
6	MF	(Malaysia) MAS	Muhammad Afif Izzuddin
7	MF	(Malaysia) MAS	Muhammad Amirul Aiman
8	MF	(Malaysia) MAS	Muhammad Nazrin Mazlan
9	FW	(Malaysia) MAS	Muhammad Faris Abdul Manaf
10	FW	(Malaysia) MAS	Azman Othman
11	MF	(Malaysia) MAS	Mohamad Hazromie Zullkifli
12	MF	(Malaysia) MAS	Muhammad Afif Mohamad Zuki
13	MF	(Malaysia) MAS	Muhammad Faes Hakimi

No.	Pos.	Nation	Player
14	MF	(Malaysia) MAS	Muhammad Aiman Maizu
15	DF	(Malaysia) MAS	Nik Shahrul
16	MF	(Malaysia) MAS	Mohamad Hafizam Zullkifli
17	DF	(Malaysia) MAS	Abu Bakar Zainal
18	MF	(Malaysia) MAS	Muhamad Ikhwan Mahadi
19	MF	(Malaysia) MAS	Imran Samso
20	DF	(Malaysia) MAS	Abdul Muhaimin Arshad
21	MF	(Malaysia) MAS	Muhammad Darwisy Hakim
22	GK	(Malaysia) MAS	Remezey Che Ros
23	MF	(Malaysia) MAS	Mohd Fauzi Abd Majid
24	DF	(Malaysia) MAS	Muhammad Zulhilmi Azmi
25	GK	(Malaysia) MAS	Muhammad Luqman Hakim
26	FW	(Malaysia) MAS	Muhammad Nur Hakim
27	DF	(Malaysia) MAS	Muhammad Eskandar Ismail
28	MF	(Malaysia) MAS	Faiz Wan Sulaiman

== Team officials ==
As of 17 July 2024

- Team manager: Mohd Saiful Bin Shamsuddin
- Assistant manager: Mohd Syafrini Bin Azmin
- Head coach: Noor Ismadi Bin Ismail
- Assistant coach: Rizal Fahmi Rosid
- Goalkeeping coach: Mohd Shazli Bin Mohamed
- Fitness coach: Aqqillah Syifa Binti Mohd Sopi
- Physiotherapist: Zulsyafiq Bin Ahmad Azmi
- Team staff: Shahrul Ezwan Bin Hasan
- Media officer: Mohd Hilmi Bin Abdullah
- Kitman: Muhammad Afiq Izzuddin Bin Zulkifli

== Honours ==
=== League ===
- A-Ligue Champions League

(silver) Runners-up (1): 2023
