= Semantan Troopers F.C. =

Malaysian football club

Semantan Troopers
- Full name: Semantan Troopers Football Club
- Short name: STFC
- Founded: 2019; 7 years ago
- Ground: Temerloh Mini Stadium
- Capacity: 10,000
- Head coach: Ehsam bin Long
- League: Malaysia A2 Amateur League

Semantan Troopers Football Club is a Malaysian football club based in Temerloh, Pahang. It plays in the third tier of the Malaysian football league system, the Malaysia A2 Amateur League.

== History ==
Founded in 2019, Semantan Troopers joined several competitions organised by the Football Association of Pahang and the Pahang Amateur League. In 2019 the club won the Temerloh FA league, and became the runners-up of the Sultan Pahang Cup in 2022. In 2023 they made their debut in the Malaysian Football League by joining the fifth-tier Malaysia M5 League (Pahang zone). They got promoted to the 2024–25 Malaysia A2 Amateur League.

== Players ==
As of 19 July 2024

Note: Flags indicate national team as defined under FIFA eligibility rules; some limited exceptions apply. Players may hold more than one non-FIFA nationality.

No.	Pos.	Nation	Player
1	GK	MAS	Jafri Husin
2	DF	MAS	B. Sathis Nair
3	DF	MAS	Mohd Ameer Khairy
4	DF	MAS	Mohd Afendi Azahari
6	DF	MAS	Nor Fazirul Amri Roslan
7	DF	MAS	Mohd Ridzuan Rozali
8	MF	MAS	M. Lingeswaran
9	MF	MAS	Zaiful Zakwan Arnain
10	FW	MAS	Safwan Abdul Mutalib
11	MF	MAS	Nazarul Amir Idham
12	MF	MAS	Muhammad Azimudin Ibrahim
13	DF	MAS	Mohd Fadeli Idris
14	DF	MAS	Muhammad Amirturahman Tambrin

No.	Pos.	Nation	Player
15	DF	MAS	Ammar Fitri Armaizal
16	MF	MAS	Muhammad Fariq Mohd Sahan
18	MF	MAS	Mohd Rezan Husain
19	MF	MAS	Mohammad Helmi Ikhmal
20	FW	MAS	Muhammad Amirul Safri
21	GK	MAS	Nurshahrul Badrul Azizul
23	DF	MAS	Muhammad Fahmi Dzil Ikhram
24	MF	MAS	Muhammad Zulhisyam Zulkifli
25	FW	MAS	Zulkiram Redzwan
33	GK	MAS	C. Kumaresan

== Team officials ==
As of 17 July 2024

- Team manager: Muhamad Affif Ashraf Jamalludin
- Head coach: Ehsam b. Long
- Assistant coach: Shahrul Hisham b. Romali
- Goalkeeping coach: Ahmad Shokri b. Din
- Fitness coach: Muhammad Fahmi b. Zulkifli
- Physiotherapist: Vivi Mahsury Binti Mohd Azmy
- Team staff: Mohd Saiful Rizan Bin Ahmad
- Team coordinator: Ammeera Sofeana Binti Abd Wahid @Abd Rashid
- Media officer: Nurul Syadia Elyana Binti Muhamad Nazam
- Kitman: Jamri b. Sala

== Honours ==
=== Domestic competitions ===
==== League ====
- Temerloh FA League

(gold) Winners (1): 2019

- Division 5/A3 League/Pahang Amateur League

(silver) Runners-up (2): 2023, 2025–26

- Division 4/A2 Amateur League

(bronze) Third place (1): 2024

==== Cups ====
- Pahang Sumbangsih Cup

(gold) Winners (1): 2022/23

- Sultan Pahang Cup

(silver) Runners-up (1): 2022
