= Malaysia A2 Amateur League =

Third level association football league in Malaysia

- Organising body: Malaysian Football League
- Founded: March 2018; 8 years ago
- Country: Malaysia
- Confederation: AFC
- Number of clubs: 21
- Level on pyramid: 3
- Promotion to: Malaysia A1 Semi-Pro League
- Relegation to: Malaysia A3 Community League
- Current champions: AZM Rovers (1st title) (2025–26)
- Most championships: SAINS FC; UiTM United; Guar Syed Alwi; AZM Rovers (1 title each)
- Broadcaster: AFL (YouTube)
- Website: https://the-afl.my/
- Current: 2026–27 Malaysia A2 Amateur League

The Malaysia A2 Amateur League (Malay: Liga A2 Amatur Malaysia), previously known as the Malaysia M4 League and the Al-Ikhsan Cup due to sponsorship reasons, is the third tier football league in the Malaysian football league system. It was created in 2018 as part of the Malaysian Football League's plan to reform the competition structure.

== Overview ==
After a rebranding of the Malaysian Football League (MFL) in March 2018, the company announced a reform of lower league competitions in Malaysia. In 2019, a new subsidiary of the company was formed, known as the Amateur Football League (AFL) which was tasked to manage the third division and below. The AFL officially confirmed the formation of the Malaysia M3 League and Malaysia M4 League as the third and fourth divisions of the Malaysian football league system.

A total of 14 clubs were confirmed to compete in the inaugural season of the newly reformed third division, the Malaysia M3 League, which replaced the former Malaysia FAM League, while the 5 FA state leagues and 9 social leagues ran in parallel to form the Malaysia M4 League.

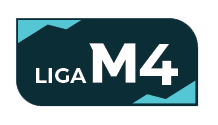
Logo used from 2019 to 2022

Logo used until the end of the 2024–25 season

== Clubs (2026–27) ==
Note: This list is provisional and could be subject to changes via official sources.

#	Club	Previous season	First season	Number of seasons	Titles	Last title
1	(Putrajaya) ACeIO	Quarter-finalist	2025–26	2	0	–
2	(Kuala Lumpur) Kampong Ku	3rd place zone 3	2024–25	3	0	–
3	Kuala Perlis Titans	Semi-finalist	2025–26	2	0	–
4	(Selangor) Sungai Merab	4th place zone 3	2025–26	2	0	–
5	(Negeri Sembilan) NS Forces Warriors	5th place zone 4	2025–26	2	0	–
6	(Negeri Sembilan) PUSEN-Seremban United	4th place zone 4	2025–26	2	0	–
7	(Pahang) Raub-STW	4th place zone 2	2025–26	2	0	–
8	(Negeri Sembilan) Teck Hin-KR	Quarter-finalist	2025–26	2	0	–
9	(Pahang) YPM	Quarter-finalist	2023	3	0	–
10	Perak FA II	Debut	2026–27	1	0	–
11	(Perlis) Star City U20	Debut	2026–27	1	0	–
12	(Penang) Kg. Rawa-Butterworth Rangers	Debut	2026–27	1	0	–
13	(Kuala Lumpur) CCCP-KDN	Debut	2026–27	1	0	–
14	(Malacca) Melaka U-20	Debut	2026–27	1	0	–
15	(Terengganu) SATU	Debut	2026–27	1	0	–
16	(Kuala Lumpur) PDRM	Debut	2026–27	1	0	–
17	(Johor) JDT Academy	Debut	2026–27	1	0	–
18	(Negeri Sembilan) MPPD	2025–26 A3 League Promoted	2023	3	0	–

== Former clubs ==
Below are the partial records of clubs that have played in the A2 League since it was established. Clubs in bold are in the Malaysia A1 Semi-Pro League as of 2026–27; clubs in italic no longer exist.

Club	Joined	Final season	Best result
(Selangor) **AAK Puncak Alam**	2024–25	2025–26	Semi-finalist (2025–26)
(Kelantan) AZM Rovers	2025–26	2025–26	Champions (2025–26)
(Perlis) Bintong	2025–26	2025–26	5th, group stage (2025–26)
(Negeri Sembilan) **Bunga Raya**	2023	2023	Quarter-finalist (2023)
(Negeri Sembilan) BR United	2024–25	2024–25	4th (2024–25)
(Malacca) Duyong Fighters	2025–26	2025–26	3rd, group stage (2025–26)
(Perlis) Guar Syed Alwi	2024–25	2024–25	Champions (2024–25)
(Putrajaya) JAKIM	2023	2024–25	Quarter-finalist (2023)
Kuala Lumpur Rovers	2025–26	2025–26	Withdrew (2025–26)
(Kuala Lumpur) KL Rangers	2025–26	2025–26	6th, group stage(2025–26)
(Kedah) Kuala Muda	2024–25	2025–26	3rd, group stage(2024–25)
(Pahang) Kuantan City	2023	2025–26	3rd, group stage(2025–26)
(Kedah) Kubang Pasu-MPKP	2025–26	2025–26	3rd, group stage(2025–26)
(Sarawak) Machan	2023	2023	3rd (2023)
(Selangor) MAHSA United	2023	2024–25	4th, group stage (2023)
(Malacca) MBMB Warriors	2025–26	2025–26	Quarter-finalist (2025–26)
(Sarawak) Mukah Youth Team	2023	2023	3rd, group stage (2023)
(Sarawak) Maqarize	2023	2023	Quarter-finalist (2023)
(Selangor) NBK Empire	2024–25	2024–25	4th (2024–25)
(Negeri Sembilan) NS Cyberfox	2023	2023	6th (2024–25)
(Perak) Pencinta Setia	2024–25	2024–25	4th (2024–25)
(Terengganu) Real Chukai	2023	2023	5th (2023)
(Negeri Sembilan) Real Mambau	2024–25	2024–25	6th (2024–25)
(Selangor) Republic of Borneo	2023	2023	5th (2023)
(Malacca) SAMB	2024–25	2024–25	Quarter-finalist (2024–25)
(Selangor) Selayang City	2024–25	2024–25	6th (2024–25)
(Pahang) Semantan Troopers	2024–25	2024–25	3rd (2024–25)
(Putrajaya) SJ Virtuosos	2024–25	2024–25	Quarter-finalist (2024–25)
(Sarawak) Susun Tenaga Resources	2023	2023	4th (2023)
**Kelantan WTS**	2023	2024–25	Runner-up (2024–25)
(Selangor) UiTM United	2023	2025–26	Champions (2023)
(Penang) **USM**	2025–26	2025–26	Runner-up (2025–26)

== Play-off champions and runners-up ==
Year	Winners	Runners-up	Score	Venue
2019	(Negeri Sembilan) KSR SAINS	(Kuala Lumpur) IKRAM Muda	1–0	UiTM Stadium, Shah Alam
2020; 2021	Cancelled due to COVID-19 pandemic			
2022	No tournament			
2023	(Selangor) UiTM United	(Pahang) YPM	2–1	UiTM Stadium, Shah Alam
2024	(Perlis) Guar Syed Alwi	Kelantan WTS	2–2 (4–2 p)	UiTM Stadium, Shah Alam
2025–26	(Kelantan) AZM Rovers	(Penang) USM	3–0	Selayang Municipal Council Stadium, Selayang

== Performance by club ==
No.	Club	Champions	Runners-up
1	KSR SAINS	1 (2019)	—N/a
2	UiTM United	1 (2023)	—N/a
3	Guar Syed Alwi	1 (2024)	—N/a
4	AZM Rovers	1 (2025–26)	—N/a
5	IKRAM Muda	—N/a	1 (2019)
6	YPM	—N/a	1 (2023)
7	Kelantan WTS	—N/a	1 (2024)
8	USM	—N/a	1 (2025–26)

== Awards ==
=== Prize money ===
The 2025–26 season, the distribution of the prize money is as follows.

- Winner: RM 50,000
- Runner-up: RM 30,000

=== Top scorers ===
Below is the list of golden boot winners of the league since its inception in 2019.

Season	Player	Club	Goals
2019	Not awarded	—N/a	—N/a
2023	(Malaysia) Arisazri Juhari	JAKIM	11
2024	(Malaysia) Fa'es Hafize Fadzil	AAK Ultimate	14
2025–26	(Malaysia) Fa'es Hafize Fadzil	AAK Ultimate	18

=== Man of the match (final) ===
Season	Player	Club
2023	Not awarded	—N/a
2024	(Malaysia) Aziz Ismail	Kelantan WTS
2025–26	(Malaysia) Aiman Fitrie Ismail	AZM Rovers

=== Winning coaches ===
Season	Winning coach	Club
2023	(Malaysia) Mohd Yazli Yahya	UiTM United
2024	(Malaysia) Mohd Firdaus bin Abdul Rahman	Guar Syed Alwi
2025–26	(Malaysia) Wan Mohd Tarmizi Wan Ismail	AZM Rovers

== See also ==
- Malaysia FA Cup
- Malaysia Cup
- FAM Football Awards
