= MAHSA University =

Private medical university in Petaling Jaya, Malaysia

Mahsa University
- Established: 2005
- Location: Selangor

Mahsa University is a private medical university in Petaling Jaya, Malaysia. It was founded in Pusat Bandar Damansara in 2005 as a college, and was upgraded to university status in 2009.

The university offers academic programs in various fields including medicine, dentistry, nursing, pharmacy, engineering, business, and law. Health courses are offered in conjunction with Northumbria University.

== See also ==
- MAHSA United F.C.
