= Ex-Treble Kelantan 2012 Consortium =

In May 2026, the Ex-Treble Kelantan 2012 consortium—composed of legendary former players who secured the historic domestic treble with Kelantan FA—announced the acquisition of an 80% majority stake in Wan Tendong Stable (WTS) FC. Led by figures such as Mohd Badhri Mohd Radzi (Piya), Nor Farhan Muhammad, and Daudsu Jamaluddin, the consortium elected to purchase the Malaysia A1 Semi-Pro League side and rebrand it as Kelantan City FC, rather than investing in Kelantan Red Warrior FC (KRW FC).

The consortium cited four distinct strategic factors for this decision:

== Debt avoidance and legal autonomy ==
By acquiring WTS FC, the new management secured a clean operational record, entirely avoiding the historic debts, salary arrears, and ongoing FIFA or Football Association of Malaysia (FAM) transfer bans that plagued older Kelantan football structures. This isolated the new entity from external liabilities.

== Administrative and veto control ==
The purchase of a definitive 80% majority stake gave the consortium absolute administrative power and veto control over the organization. This structural autonomy allowed them to overhaul technical and financial processes directly, a capacity that would have been heavily restricted had they entered KRW FC as minority shareholders.

== Operational and financial sustainability ==
By operating within the second-tier Malaysia A1 Semi-Pro League, the club benefits from significantly lower overhead costs. This approach mitigates the extreme financial pressures faced by clubs fast-tracked into the top-flight Malaysia Super League, allowing the consortium to build a stable corporate and sponsorship ecosystem gradually.

== Brand rehabilitation ==
The club was purposefully rebranded as Kelantan City FC to establish a fresh identity. The new name seeks to rebuild fractured relationships with local supporters and major corporate partners who had become alienated by continuous controversies surrounding the historic "The Red Warriors" (TRW) brand.

== See also ==
- Malaysian football league system
- Kelantan F.C.
