= Perlis GSA F.C. =

Malaysian football club

Perlis GSA
- Full name: Perlis Guar Syed Alwi Football Club
- Nickname: The Guaryzen Fighters
- Founded: 2016; 10 years ago, as Guar Syed Alwi FC
- Ground: Tuanku Syed Putra Stadium
- Capacity: 20,000
- Owner: Kelab Bola Sepak Guar Syed Alwi
- Head coach: Abdullah Hassan
- League: Malaysia A1 Semi-Pro League
- 2025–26: Malaysia A1 Semi-Pro League, 14th of 16
Home colours	Away colours

Perlis Guar Syed Alwi Football Club, also known as Perlis GSA, is a Malaysian football club from Kampung Guar Syed Alwi, Kangar, Perlis. They last played in the second division of the Malaysian football, the Malaysia A1 Semi-Pro League, after promotion from the Malaysia A2 Amateur League.

== History ==
Founded in 2016, Guar Syed Alwi made club debut in the Malaysian Football League by joining the fourth-tier Perlis Super League. By becoming champions, they automatically qualified to the 2024–25 Malaysia A2 Amateur League.

On 6 December 2024, Guar Syed Alwi clinched the Malaysia A2 Amateur League title, securing promotion to the Malaysia A1 Semi-Pro League. They triumphed in the final against Kelantan WTS, winning 4–2 in a penalty shoot-out after a 2–2 draw in regular time. The rebranding of the club is in line with efforts to bring the Perlis name to higher levels of competition.

== Stadium ==
Tuanku Syed Putra Stadium is a multi-purpose stadium in Kangar. The stadium holds a capacity of 20,000 people and was opened in 1995.

== Players (2025) ==
Note: Flags indicate national team as defined under FIFA eligibility rules; some limited exceptions apply. Players may hold more than one non-FIFA nationality.

No.	Pos.	Nation	Player
1	GK	MAS	Fitri Ismail
4	DF	MAS	Azril Hafidz Abdul Rashid
5	DF	MAS	Hafiz Abdul Karim
6	DF	MAS	Akmal Afizan Tajudin
7	MF	MAS	Azannis Adzri
8	DF	MAS	Nasri Ahmad Thauhid
10	MF	MAS	Anas Shaharom (captain)
11	MF	MAS	Nor Mohd Hafizz
14	MF	MAS	Hazwan Hassan
16	MF	MAS	Firdaus Kaironnisam
17	FW	MAS	Ikmal Faiz Azmi

No.	Pos.	Nation	Player
19	FW	MAS	Nashrul Shazrin Roslan
20	DF	MAS	Arif Nazdman Roslan
21	DF	MAS	Putra Luqman Nurhakeem
22	GK	MAS	Kamarul Hilmi Adenan
24	DF	MAS	Hafizi Mat Podzi
25	MF	MAS	Haziq Mu'iz Abdul
27	FW	MAS	Mohd Ikmal Ibrahim
28	FW	MAS	Afnan Mubbin Azman
29	FW	MAS	Azrizan Ahmad
30	MF	MAS	Faizal Kadir

== Management (2025) ==
Position	Name
Team manager	(Malaysia) Amar Rohidan
Assistant manager	(Malaysia) Syed Amir Shaffiq bin Syed Zainal Abidin
Head coach	(Malaysia) Abdullah Hassan
Goalkeeper coach	(Malaysia) Ahmad Jazree Abdul Ghani
Physio	(Malaysia) Razi bin Ramli
Media manager	(Malaysia) Zarif Rifqi bin Zaimidi
Team security	(Malaysia) Muhammad Alif Aswat bin Baharin
Kitman	(Malaysia) Mohd Akmal Faiz bin Ratim (Malaysia) Muhd Muizzuddin Azim bin Marzimi

== Season by season record ==
Season	Division	Position	Malaysia Cup	Malaysian FA Cup	Malaysian Charity Shield	Regional	Top scorer (all competitions)
2022	Perlis Super League	Runners-up	DNQ	DNQ	–	–	
2023	Perlis Super League	Champions	DNQ	DNQ	–	–	
2024–25	A2 Amateur League	Champions	DNQ	DNQ	–	–	(Malaysia) Mohd Ikmal Faiz (5)
2025–26	A1 Semi-Pro League	14th of 15	DNQ	DNQ	–	–	(Malaysia) Faizal Kadir (4)

Champions	Runners-up	Third place	Promoted	Relegated

== Honours ==
=== Domestic competitions ===
==== League ====
- Division 4/A2 League

(gold) Winners (1): 2024

- Division 5/A3 Community League/Perlis Super League

(gold) Winners (1): 2023

(silver) Runners-up (1): 2022

== See also ==
- Football in Malaysia
- Football Association of Perlis
