= Selayang City F.C. =

Malaysian football club

Selayang City
- Full name: Selayang City Football Club
- Short name: SCFC
- Founded: 2023; 2 years ago, as Gombak City
- Ground: Selayang Stadium, Selayang
- Capacity: 16,000
- Head coach: Reman Ragunathan
- League: Malaysia A3 Community League
- 2024–25: Malaysia A2 Amateur League, relegated

Selayang City Football Club, simply known as Selayang City, is a Malaysian football club based in Selayang, Selangor. It plays in the third tier of the Malaysian football league system, the Malaysia A2 Amateur League.

== History ==
Founded in 2023 as Gombak City, club joined the MAHSA-KRONOS M5 League and became the champion, qualifying on merit to the 2024–25 Malaysia A2 Amateur League, the third-tier league organised by the Amateur Football League (AFL).

== Players (2024) ==
Note: Flags indicate national team as defined under FIFA eligibility rules; some limited exceptions apply. Players may hold more than one non-FIFA nationality.

No.	Pos.	Nation	Player
1	GK	MAS	Imran Syahmi
2	DF	MAS	Syahmil Afiq
3	DF	MAS	Danish Qayyim
4	DF	MAS	Irfan Shahidi
5	MF	MAS	Nur Haziq
6	DF	MAS	Shahir Adzha
7	FW	MAS	R. Thrishen
8	MF	MAS	Syed Muhammed Adam
9	DF	MAS	Hariz Dzulkhairi
10	FW	MAS	Hadzirun Che Hamid
11	MF	MAS	Y. Divendran
12	MF	MAS	Harith Amir
13	MF	MAS	Saiputra Yusri

No.	Pos.	Nation	Player
14	MF	MAS	Uzma Syazwan
16	DF	MAS	G. Maiyurran
17	DF	MAS	Mahazin Jasuli
18	DF	MAS	Muhammad Zen Azhar
19	DF	MAS	Harith Ammar
20	MF	MAS	Zakuan Baharudin
21	GK	MAS	Aris Patur Rohmatulloh
22	MF	MAS	Alif Azhan
23	GK	MAS	Hafiz Ramlan
25	MF	MAS	Hakimie Hidayat
26	DF	MAS	Saravanan A/L Raja Ram
27	MF	MAS	Azfar Aqwa
28	MF	MAS	Muhammad Hidayat Basir
29	MF	MAS	Shamirul Abdul Haniff

== Technical staff ==
As of 26 July 2024

- Team manager: Mohd Zikry Bin Zulkifle
- Head coach: Reman Ragunathan A/L P.Subramaniam
- Assistant coaches: Murukan A/L Manickam
- Goalkeeper coach: Mohd Adli Syahzmi Mohd Shah
- Physio: Mohd azri bin abd. Rahman
- Kitman: Mohd Firdaus Bin Yusof

== Honours ==
=== Domestic competitions ===
==== League ====
- MAHSA-Kronos M5 League

(gold) Winners (1):2023

==== Cups ====
- None
