= Kuala Muda F.A. =

Malaysian football club

Kuala Muda
- Full name: Kuala Muda Football Association
- Short name: KMFC
- Founded: 2022; 4 years ago
- Ground: Sungai Petani Municipal Council Sports Complex
- Capacity: 2,500
- Owner: Sungai Petani Municipal Council
- Head coach: Koet King Heyong
- League: Malaysia A2 Amateur League

Kuala Muda Football Association (Malay: Persatuan Bola Sepak Daerah Kuala Muda) is a Malaysian football club based in Kuala Muda District, Sungai Petani, Kedah. It plays in the third tier of the Malaysian football league system, the Malaysia A2 Amateur League.

== History ==
Founded in 2022, Kuala Muda FA joined 2024–25 Malaysia A2 Amateur League as an invited team. Kuala Muda F.A. plays its home matches at the Sungai Petani Municipal Council Sports Complex, which has a capacity of approximately 1,000 spectators. In 2024, Kuala Muda FA was invited to participate in the Malaysia A2 Amateur League.

== Players ==
As of September 2025

Note: Flags indicate national team as defined under FIFA eligibility rules; some limited exceptions apply. Players may hold more than one non-FIFA nationality.

No.	Pos.	Nation	Player
1	GK	MAS	Hatta Zulkarnain
2	DF	MAS	Amirul Izwan
3	DF	MAS	Nur Syadat Azeman
4	DF	MAS	Syazwan Halim
5	DF	MAS	Zairul Hisyam Hakimi
6	DF	MAS	Fathurrahman Abdul Mutalib
7	MF	MAS	Firdaus Abdul Rahman
8	FW	MAS	Habri Firdaus
9	FW	MAS	Yazman Hafiz
10	MF	MAS	Akmal Marzukin
11	FW	MAS	Fakhrul Kuzaimi Allias
12	DF	MAS	Ajwad Asamuddin
13	FW	MAS	Diniy Danial

No.	Pos.	Nation	Player
14	MF	MAS	Aidil Hakim
15	MF	MAS	Syafiq Mohd Azman
16	MF	MAS	Adam Mohd Yusuri
17	MF	MAS	Syazwan Mahzir
18	MF	MAS	Izzat Zuhairie
19	MF	MAS	Sheikh Asiff Zameer
20	FW	MAS	Nur Amin Azmi
21	FW	MAS	Asyraf Anuar
22	GK	MAS	Nazirul Ahmad
23	FW	MAS	Harith Idris
24	MF	MAS	Fakhrul Hisham
25	GK	MAS	Farhan Aswad

== Club officials ==
As of September 2025

- Team manager: Mohd Zuraimi Bin Zulkeply
- Assistant manager: Muhammad Hadi Haikal Bin Boon Vian
- Head coach: Koet King Heyong
- Assistant coach: Ishak Ahmad
- Goalkeeping coach: Suhaimi Mohd Zain
- Fitness coach: Mahendra Rao
- Physio: Muhammad Ashbil Sobhi
- Team admin: Suhaimi Bin Abdul
- Media officer: Mohammad Noor Aswandie B Mohd Noor
- Kitman: Dahlan Abd Ghani
