= Kelantan City F.C. =

Malaysian football club

Kelantan City
- Full name: Kelantan City Football Club
- Nickname: The Red Fighter
- Short name: KCFC
- Founded: 2014; 12 years ago, as Wan Tendong Stable FC; 19 June 2026; 4 months ago, as Kelantan City FC
- Ground: Pasir Mas Mini Stadium; Sultan Muhammad IV Stadium
- Capacity: 6,000; 30,000
- President: Annuar Musa
- Owner: Wan Mohd Ridhuan
- Head coach: Alfredo González
- League: Malaysia A1 Semi-Pro League
- 2025–26: Malaysia A1 Semi-Pro League, 7th of 16
- Website: Kelantan City
Home colours	Away colours	Third colours

Kelantan City Football Club, simply known as Kelantan City, formerly Wan Tendong Stable, is a Malaysian professional football club based in Pasir Mas, Kelantan. They are playing in the second division of the Malaysian football, the Malaysia A1 Semi-Pro League, after promotion from the Malaysia A2 Amateur League.

== History ==
=== Formation and early years ===
Founded in 2014, as Wan Tendong Stable made their club debut into Malaysian Football League by joining the third-tier Malaysia M4 League and finished in quarter-final stage, losing to Machan. On 6 December 2024, WTS advanced to the league final, but lost to Guar Syed Alwi 4–2 in a penalty shoot-out. The club also promoted to the second tier of the Malaysian league after finishing the 2024–25 Malaysia A2 Amateur League as runner-ups, playing their first season in the 2025–26 Malaysia A1 Semi-Pro League.

=== 2026 takeover and rebranding ===
In May 2026, the "Ex-Treble Kelantan 2012" consortium of former Kelantan FA players acquired an 80% stake in WTS FC, bypassing Kelantan Red Warrior FC (KRW FC) to reconnect with alienated fans and partners. Led by former national players including Mohd Badhri Radzi, Nor Farhan Muhammad, Zairul Fitree Ishak, and Daudsu Jamaluddin, the takeover aimed to restore the integrity of football administration. On 19 June 2026, the club was officially rebranded as Kelantan City Football Club. During the first leg of the 2026–27 Malaysia FA Cup round of 16 fixtures, Kelantan City manage to defeat Malaysia Super League side Negeri Sembilan 2–0.

== Crest and colours ==
=== Crest ===
2025–2026

== Players ==
=== First-team squad ===
As of September 2026

Note: Flags indicate national team as defined under FIFA eligibility rules; some limited exceptions apply. Players may hold more than one non-FIFA nationality.

No.	Pos.	Nation	Player
2	DF	MAS	Khairul Rizam
3	DF	MAS	Ahmad Nazri Mohamad
4	DF	MAS	Shahrul Aidiel Irrwan^{U22}
5	DF	MAS	Aiman Akif Abdullah Yob^{U22}
6	DF	GHA	Dandy Arbdallah
7	FW	MAS	Asraff Aliffuddin
8	FW	MAS	Wan Zaharulnizam Zakaria (captain)
9	FW	MAS	Abdul Raziq Rahman^{U22}
10	FW	NGR	Emmanuel Uzochukwu
11	FW	MAS	Allee Putra Azril^{U22}
12	DF	MAS	Aiman Yusof
15	MF	MAS	Muhammad Haikal Musyrif
16	MF	MAS	Shafiq Al-Hafiz
18	DF	MAS	Wan Amirul Afiq
19	MF	MAS	Ikhwan Yazek
20	FW	MAS	Nazrin Nawi
21	MF	CIV	Abdoul Aziz Doumbia

No.	Pos.	Nation	Player
22	FW	MAS	Fazli Ghazali
23	DF	MAS	Megat Najmie Afnan^{U22}
24	MF	MAS	Hakimi Abdullah
25	DF	MAS	Faris Shah Rosli
27	MF	MAS	Hadin Azman
28	MF	MAS	Amirul Shafik Che Soh
29	GK	MAS	Syazwan Yusoff
30	MF	MAS	Syaahir Saiful
33	GK	MAS	Fikri Che Soh
38	GK	MAS	Yuaiman Mat Jusohl
50	FW	MAS	Adam Shafeeq Abdullah^{U22}
55	MF	MAS	Ahmad Azraf Azam
66	MF	MAS	Wan Muhammad Irfan^{U22}
78	FW	MAS	Aqil Hilman
80	MF	MAS	Amir Abda

== Management ==
Position	Name
Team manager	(Malaysia) Wan Muhd Ridhuan Wan Abdullah
Assistant team manager	(Malaysia) Dato' Mohd Rowi bin Dollah (Malaysia) Aladin bin Che Kob
Club secretary	(Malaysia) Mohd Afiq bin Abd Manaf
Head coach	(Uruguay) Alfredo González
Assistant head coach	(Malaysia) Zairul Fitree Ishak (Malaysia) Kamarudin Muhamad
Assistant coach	(Malaysia) Farisham Ismail (Malaysia) Ahmad Shahril
Goalkeeper coach	(Malaysia) Shahrizan Ismail
Fitness coach	(Malaysia) Normazri bin Mamat (Malaysia) Daudsu Jamaludin
Team officer	(Malaysia) Nor Farhan Muhammad (Malaysia) Mohd Badhri Mohd Radzi
Team admin	(Malaysia) Nor Hisham bin Mohd Nasir
Media officer	(Malaysia) Normeezan bin Muhd Nordin
Kitman	(Malaysia) M. Shahrul Ridzuan bin Samsuddin (Malaysia) Khairul Aizat bin Mustaffa

== Season by season record ==
Season	League									FA Cup	M Cup	C Cup	Top goalscorer (all competitions)	
Season	Division	P	W	D	L	F	A	Pts	Pos	FA Cup	M Cup	C Cup	Name	Goals
2023	M4 League	8	4	1	3	12	11	13	QF	Opted out	DNQ	DNQ	(Malaysia) Khairul Rizam	5
2024–25	A2 Amateur League	6	6	0	0	18	5	18	2nd	Opted out	DNQ	DNQ	(Malaysia) Mohamad Faizwan	12
2025–26	A1 Semi-Pro League	28	13	5	10	18	37	40	7th	Opted out	DNQ	DNQ	(Malaysia) Aqil Hilman	10
2026–27	A1 Semi-Pro League	0	0	0	0	0	0	0	TBD	Quarter-finals	TBD	TBD	TBD	TBD

Champions	Runners-up	Promoted	Relegated

== Honours ==
=== Domestic competitions ===
==== League ====
- Division 4/A2 League

(silver) Runners-up (1): 2024
