= MAHSA United F.C. =

Malaysian football club

MAHSA United
- Full name: MAHSA United Football Club
- Founded: 2022; 4 years ago as MAHSA City
- Ground: MAHSA University Mini Stadium
- Capacity: 1,000
- Owner: MAHSA University
- Head coach: Mohd Shaipul Bin Abd Kadir
- League: Malaysia A3 Community League
- 2024–25: Malaysia A2 Amateur League, relegated

MAHSA United Football Club, simply known as MAHSA United, is a Malaysian football club based in Jenjarom, Kuala Langat District, Selangor. It plays in the fourth tier of the Malaysian football league system, the Malaysia A3 Community League.

== History ==
Founded in 2022 as MAHSA City, club joined the Liga Mahsa-Kronos M5 and become a champion. Thus, it got promoted to 2023 Malaysia M4 League

== Season by season record ==
Season	Division	Position	Malaysia Cup	Malaysian FA Cup	Malaysian Charity Shield	Regional	Top scorer (all competitions)
2022	M5 League	Champions	DNQ	DNQ	DNQ	DNQ	
2023	M4 League	4th place (Zone 1)	DNQ	DNQ	DNQ	DNQ	(Malaysia) Mohd Rahmat (4)
2024–25	A2 Amateur League	5th place (Zone 2)	DNQ	DNQ	DNQ	DNQ	(Malaysia) Naufal Al Hakim (3)
2025–26	A3 Community League	6th place	DNQ	DNQ	DNQ	DNQ	

Notes:'

^1 Season cancelled due to COVID-19 pandemic.

== Players (2024) ==
Note: Flags indicate national team as defined under FIFA eligibility rules; some limited exceptions apply. Players may hold more than one non-FIFA nationality.

No.	Pos.	Nation	Player
1	GK	MAS	Raja Amir Syah Daniel
2	DF	MAS	Fehriz Hakim
3	DF	MAS	Naufal Al-Hakim
4	DF	MAS	Muhammad Zhafri
5	MF	MAS	Logan Leo
6	MF	MAS	P. Puventhan
7	MF	MAS	Soffey Zarul Zackwan
8	MF	MAS	Danish Ameer Syauqi
9	MF	MAS	Aiman Danial
10	MF	MAS	Muhammad Iqbal
11	MF	MAS	Ahmad Ilhan Hafiz
12	MF	MAS	Zulhairi Adenan
13	DF	MAS	Muhammad Nabil Iman

No.	Pos.	Nation	Player
14	DF	MAS	Muhammad Afiq Akmal
15	MF	MAS	Sesshateery
16	FW	MAS	Muhammad Izham
18	FW	MAS	Afdhal Shahryll Nizam
19	MF	MAS	Muhammad Izzul Iman
21	MF	MAS	Muhammad Danial Hakimi
23	DF	MAS	Danieal Hakim
24	FW	MAS	Hisyamuddin Rozelan
25	DF	MAS	Fadzilah Jalaludin
26	FW	MAS	Amir Hakimi Dasuki
27	FW	MAS	Muhammad Haziq Haiqal
30	GK	MAS	Amirul Aqasha Shaharudin
31	GK	MAS	T. Thivan

== Team officials ==
As of 17 July 2024

- Team manager: Mohd Faizul Mohd Nor
- Head coach: Yogeswaran Al Veeramalai
- Assistant coach: Khairul Azuar Bin Kamirun
- Goalkeeping coach: Kingsley
- Physiotherapist: Julian Christopher Richard
- Team staff: R. Navarathnaraja A/L Ramamurti
- Media officer: Rohaida Izlin Binti Ibrahim, Mohd Faizul B Mohd Nor
- Kitman: Halimin Bin Salamun

== Honours ==
=== Domestic competitions ===
==== League ====
- Mahsa-Kronos M5 League

(gold) Winners (1): 2022

- Liga IPT Malaysia Divisyen 2

(gold) Winners (1):

- Liga IPT Malaysia Divisyen 3

(bronze) Third place (1):
