= 2023 Malaysia M4 League =

Malaysian football season

Al-Ikhsan Cup
- Dates: June – October 2023
- Champions: UiTM United
- Promoted: UiTM United; YP Maintenance; Bunga Raya; Machan
- Matches: 69
- Goals: 232 (3.36 per match)
- Top goalscorer: Arisazri Juhari (11 goals)
- Biggest home win: 10 goals JAKIM 10–0 NS Cyberfox (19 August 2023)
- Biggest away win: 6 goals NS Cyberfox 0–5 MP Port Dickson (26 August 2023)
- Highest scoring: 10 goals JAKIM 10–0 NS Cyberfox (19 August 2023)
- All statistics correct as of 7 October 2023.

The 2023 Malaysia M4 League (Malay: Liga M4 Malaysia), also known as the Al-Ikhsan Cup for sponsorship reasons, was the second season of the Malaysia M4 League, currently the third tier football league of the Malaysian football league system. This is the first season where the league is held as a single division.

== Format ==
The tournament is played as follows:

- League level: 15 teams are divided into three zones, namely Zone 1 (6 teams), Zone 2 (5 teams) and Zone 3 (4 teams), each drawn from the Central/South, East and Borneo regions.
  - Round 1 Divided into three zones, each team will play at home and away to determine the position in the group. The top two teams in each zone, including third team in Zones 1 & 2, will advance to the knockout stage.
- Knockout stage: The knockout stage is the match to determine the winner. Finalists will be promoted to 2024–25 Malaysia M3 League.

== Season changes ==
The following teams have changed division since the 2022 season.

=== To Al-Ikhsan Cup ===
Withdrawn from the Super League

- (Selangor) UiTM United

Relegated from the M3 League

- (Terengganu) Real Chukai

Promoted from the M5 League

- (Negeri Sembilan) Bunga Raya – Nogori M5 (League 1) quarter-finalist
- (Pahang) Cendawan FC – Kuantan Amateur League runners-up
- (Negeri Sembilan) Cyberfox – Nogori M5 League (League 2) semi-finalist
- JAKIM – Putrajaya League Winner
- (Selangor) MAHSA City – Liga Mahsa-Kronos M5 runners-up
- (Negeri Sembilan) MP Port Dickson – Nogori M5 League 1 Winner
- (Sarawak) Mukah Youth Team – Ligue M5 Bintulu 2022 semi-finalist
- (Selangor) Republic of Borneo – Liga Mahsa-Kronos M5 Winner
- (Pahang) YP Maintenance – Kuantan Amateur League Winner

Invited team

- (Sarawak) Machan
- (Sarawak) Maqarize
- (Sarawak) STR
- (Kelantan) Wan Tendong Stable

=== From Al-Ikhsan Cup ===
Promoted to Malaysia M3 League

- None

Teams withdrawn

- (Sarawak) AS United F.C. ^{^{1}}
- (Kedah) FC Langkawi ^{^{2}}
- (Kelantan) Kijang Rangers ^{^{2}}
- (Kedah) Langkawi City ^{^{2}}
- (Kelantan) Tok Janggut Warriors ^{^{2}}
- (Kuala Lumpur) Tun Razak City ^{^{2}}

=== Name changes ===
- (Selangor) UiTM FC were renamed to UiTM United FC
- (Pahang) Cendawan FC were renamed to CF Kuantan City

Notes:

^1 Promoted by the Winning 2022 S-Ligue M5 Sarawak.
^2 Originally relegated from the 2022 Malaysia M3 League, however the teams were not registered to the 2023 Malaysia M4 League due to unknown reasons.

== Clubs ==
Below are the list of clubs who will join the 2023 season, based on the status gained from Amateur Football League.

- (Negeri Sembilan) Bunga Raya
- (Negeri Sembilan) Cyberfox
- (Pahang) CF Kuantan City
- (Putrajaya) JAKIM
- (Sarawak) Machan
- (Selangor) MAHSA City
- (Sarawak) Maqarize
- (Sarawak) Mukah Youth Team
- (Negeri Sembilan) MP Port Dickson
- (Terengganu) Real Chukai
- (Selangor) Republic of Borneo
- (Sarawak) STR
- (Selangor) UiTM United
- (Kelantan) Wan Tendong Stable
- (Pahang) YP Maintenance

== Stadiums and locations ==
Team	Location	Stadium	Capacity
Bunga Raya	Seremban	Arena IRC Negeri Sembilan, Bandar Sri Sendayan	800
CF Kuantan City	Kuantan	Padang MPK	700
NS Cyberfox	Nilai	Seriemas Sportsplex, Nilai	500
JAKIM	Putrajaya	MMU Stadium, Cyberjaya	1,500
Machan	Petra Jaya, Kuching	Padang D, Petra Jaya Sports Complex	700
MAHSA City	Jenjarom	MAHSA University Mini Stadium	1,000
Maqarize	Kota Samarahan	UNIMAS Stadium	6,000
MP Port Dickson	Port Dickson	Padang Merdeka	1,500
Mukah Youth Team	Mukah	Mukah Stadium	1,500
Real Chukai	Chukai, Kemaman	Mak Chili Stadium	2,000
Republic of Borneo	Sepang	UPM Stadium	3,000
Susun Tenaga Resources	Sarikei	Bintangor Sports Complex	1,000
UiTM United	Shah Alam	UiTM Stadium	10,000
WTS FC	Pasir Mas	Pasir Mas Mini Stadium	6,000
YP Maintenance	Kuantan	UIA Mini Stadium, Kuantan	2,500

=== Draws ===
The draw ceremony was held on 25 May 2023, at 15:00 (MST).

Central/South Zone 1 Teams Bunga Raya JAKIM MAHSA City MP Port Dickson Republic of Borneo NS Cyberfox	East Coast Zone 2 Teams CF Kuantan City Real Chukai YP Maintenance WTS FC UiTM United	Borneo Zone 3 Teams Maqarize Mukah Youth Team Machan Susun Tenaga Resources

== Personnel and sponsoring ==
Team	Head coach	Captain	Kit manufacturer	Sponsor
Bunga Raya	(Malaysia) Gunalan Padathan	(Malaysia) K. Ravindran	Kimicom	Sakti Sari Sdn Bhd
CF Kuantan City	(Malaysia) Kamarulazlan Pati	(Malaysia) Firdaus Paris	Let's Play Performance	
Cyberfox	(Malaysia) Syah Juan	(Malaysia) Asmaie Alias	Forfeit	
JAKIM	(Malaysia) Mohd Nik	(Malaysia) Saiful Rahman		
Machan	(Malaysia) Endrew Lawadin	(Malaysia) Paul Sambang	Keris Sakti	
MAHSA City	(Malaysia) Shaiful Abd Kadir	(Malaysia) Izham Alizan	Kronos	MAHSA University
Maqarize	(Malaysia) Busrah Ahmad	(Malaysia) Hairol Mokhtar	Lotto	
MP Port Dickson	(Malaysia) Adnan Mohd Din	(Malaysia) Amirul Asyraf	Blackbox	
Mukah Youth	(Malaysia) Jamal Wasli	(Malaysia) Iqbal Latip		
Real Chukai	(Malaysia) Che Ku Marzuki	(Malaysia) Haidhir Suhaini	Voltra	University College TATI
Republic of Borneo	(Malaysia) Manchon Andangon	(Malaysia) Camilus David	Kimicom	Kimicom Network
STR	(Malaysia) Raziman Ramblie	(Malaysia) Awang Jamali	Kovra	
UiTM United	(Malaysia) Yazli Yahaya	(Malaysia) Adam Afiz	Let's Play Performance	
WTS FC	(Malaysia) Che Saufi Ibrahim	(Malaysia) Hazeman Abd Karim		
YP Maintenance	(Malaysia) Syed Fairul Hakim	(Malaysia) Syawal Norsham	Legasi 06	YP Maintenance Sdn Bhd, Sinatra Barbershop, Legasi

== Standings ==
=== Zone 1 (Central/South) ===
Pos	Team	Pld	W	D	L	GF	GA	GD	Pts	Promotion or qualification	MPD	BUN	JAK	MAH	ROB	CYB
1	MP Port Dickson	10	6	4	0	26	8	+18	22	Advance to Knockout stage		2–0	1–1	0–0	4–1	4–0
2	Bunga Raya	10	6	3	1	32	9	+23	21	Advance to Knockout stage & Promotion to Liga A1	3–3		0–0	4–0	8–1	2–1
3	JAKIM	10	6	2	2	29	8	+21	20	Advance to Knockout stage	1–3	1–2		2–1	4–0	10–0
4	MAHSA City	10	4	2	4	16	16	0	14		1–2	1–1	0–4		5–0	3–2
5	Republic of Borneo	10	1	1	8	10	38	−28	4	Relegated to Liga A3	1–1	0–5	1–4	1–3		3–1
6	NS Cyberfox	10	1	0	9	7	41	−34	3	Relegated to Liga A3	0–6	0–7	0–2	0–2	3–2	

Updated to match(es) played on 26 August 2023. Source: https://cms.fam.org.my/v1/standings
Legend: Blue = home team win; Yellow = draw; Red = away team win.
Rules for classification: 1) Points; 2) Goal difference; 3) Number of goals scored.

=== Zone 2 (East Coast) ===
Pos	Team	Pld	W	D	L	GF	GA	GD	Pts	Promotion or qualification	YPM	UIT	WTS	KUA	REA
1	YP Maintenance	8	5	2	1	14	7	+7	17	Advance to Knockout stage & Promotion to Liga A1		1–1	4–2	0–1	1–0
2	UiTM United	8	4	1	3	14	9	+5	13	Advance to Knockout stage & Promotion to Liga A1	0–1		3–1	5–1	1–3
3	WTS FC	8	4	1	3	12	11	+1	13	Advance to Knockout stage	1–1	1–0		2–0	2–0
4	CF Kuantan City	8	2	2	4	7	14	−7	8	Relegated to Liga A3	1–2	0–2	2–1		1–1
5	Real Chukai	8	1	2	5	8	14	−6	5	Relegated to Liga A3	1–4	1–2	1–2	1–1	

Updated to match(es) played on 26 August 2023. Source: https://cms.fam.org.my/v1/standings
Legend: Blue = home team win; Yellow = draw; Red = away team win.
Rules for classification: 1) Points; 2) Goal difference; 3) Number of goals scored.

=== Zone 3 (Borneo) ===
Pos	Team	Pld	W	D	L	GF	GA	GD	Pts	Promotion or qualification	MAC	MAQ	MYT	STR
1	Machan	6	4	2	0	14	4	+10	14	Advance to Knockout stage & Promotion to Liga A1		0–0	2–0	5–1
2	Maqarize	6	2	4	0	8	2	+6	10	Advance to Knockout stage	0–0		5–0	0–0
3	Mukah Youth Team	6	2	0	4	11	12	−1	6	Dissolved next season.	1–2	1–2		4–1
4	Susun Tenaga Resources FC	6	0	2	4	5	20	−15	2	Dissolved next season.	2–5	1–1	0–5	

Updated to match(es) played on 19 August 2023. Source: https://cms.fam.org.my/v1/standings
Legend: Blue = home team win; Yellow = draw; Red = away team win.
Rules for classification: 1) Points; 2) Goal difference; 3) Number of goals scored.

== Knockout stage ==
=== Bracket ===
Quarter-finals
Machan	1(6)
WTS FC	1(5)
Bunga Raya	1
UiTM United	2
YP Maintenance	1
JAKIM	0
MP Port Dickson	2
Maqarize	0

Semi-finals
Machan	0
UiTM United	4
YP Maintenance	2
MP Port Dickson	1

Final
UiTM United	2
YP Maintenance	1

==== Quarter-finals ====
9 September 2023	Machan	1−1 (a.e.t.) (6–5 p)	WTS FC	Kuching
20:15 UTC+8	Hafiz Abu Bakar 15'	Report	Khairul Rizam 22'	Stadium: Sarawak State Stadium; Attendance: 600; Referee: Ensali Sabang

9 September 2023	YP Maintenance	1−0	JAKIM	Gambang
16:15 UTC+8	Amir Eimran 81'	Report		Stadium: SSM Pahang Mini Stadium; Attendance: 112; Referee: Ahmad Hafiz Muhamed

9 September 2023	Bunga Raya	1−2	UiTM United	Bandar Sri Sendayan
16:15 UTC+8	S. Thipanraj 52'	Report	Asyraaf Rifqi 58'; Mirza Malik 80'	Stadium: Padang Arena IRC; Attendance: 20; Referee: Shahmi Ismail

9 September 2023	MP Port Dickson	2−0	Maqarize	Port Dickson
16:15 UTC+8	Ibrahim Suhaib 45+1'; Al Rifae 90+2' (pen.)	Report		Stadium: Padang Merdeka; Attendance: 60; Referee: Sofi Romli

==== Semi-finals ====
22 September 2023	Machan	0−4	UiTM United	Kuching
15:45 UTC+8		Report	Fakhrur Razi 7'; Putra Daniel 36'; Haikal Haziq 54'; Mirza Malik 70'	Stadium: Sarawak State Stadium; Attendance: 600; Referee: Ensali Sabang a/k Timban

23 September 2023	YP Maintenance	2−1	MP Port Dickson	Gambang
16:15 UTC+8	Azamuddin Akil 37' (pen.); Shahrul Aizad 63'	Report	Ahmad Daniel 39'	Stadium: SSM Pahang Mini Stadium; Attendance: 217; Referee: Tuan Mohd Faizrullah

== Final ==
7 October 2023
21:00 (MST)

UiTM United	2−1 (a.e.t.)	YP Maintenance
Fakhrur Razi 74' (pen.), 107' (pen.)	Report	Mohamad Ilham 10' (o.g.)

UiTM Stadium, Shah Alam
Attendance: 2868
Referee: Kamil Zakaria Ismail

== Champion ==
Champion

UiTM United
First Title

== Season statistics ==
=== Top scorers ===
As of 7 October 2023

Rank	Player	Club	Goals
1	(Malaysia) Arisazri Juhari	JAKIM	11
2	(Malaysia) Fakhrur Razi	UiTM United	10
2	(Malaysia) K. Ravindran	Bunga Raya	10
4	(Malaysia) Rozaimi Rahman	Machan	4
4	(Malaysia) Sufizal Ismail	Mukah YT	4
4	(Malaysia) Kalaiarasan Murugun	Bunga Raya	4
7	(Malaysia) Bukhairi Idris	MP Port Dickson	6

=== Hat-tricks ===
Player	For	Against	Result	Date
(Malaysia) Izzan Syahmi	Real Chukai	UiTM United	3-1 (A)	3 June 2023
(Malaysia) Fakhrur Razi	UiTM United	WTS	3-1 (H)	24 June 2023
(Malaysia) Sufizal Ismail^{4}	Mukah YT	STR	4-1 (H)	8 July 2023
(Malaysia) Arisazri Juhari	Jakim	Republic of Borneo	4-1 (A)	9 July 2023
(Malaysia) K. Ravindran^{4}	Bunga Raya	Republic of Borneo	8-1 (H)	16 July 2023
(Malaysia) Rozaimi Rahman	Machan	STR	5-2 (A)	5 August 2023
(Malaysia) Arisazri Juhari^{4}	Jakim	Cyberfox	10-0 (H)	19 August 2023
(Malaysia) Lokman Hakim Saifuddin	Jakim	Cyberfox	10-0 (H)	19 August 2023

Notes

^{4} Player scored 4 goals
^{5} Player scored 5 goals
(H) – Home team
(A) – Away team

=== Clean sheets ===
As of 7 October 2023

Rank	Player	Club	Clean sheets
1	(Malaysia) Arif Haikal	JAKIM	5
2	(Malaysia) Hafiezulhisyam Roslee	Maqarize	4
3	(Malaysia) Ahmad Uzair	Machan	3
4	(Malaysia) Amirul Aqasha	Mahsa City	2
4	(Malaysia) Amirul Asyraf	MP Port Dickson	2
4	(Malaysia) Moganaram Balakrishnan	Bunga Raya	2
4	(Malaysia) Yuaiman Jusoh	WTS	2
7	(Malaysia) Amar Irfan	STR	1
7	(Malaysia) Afiq Afandi	MP Port Dickson	1
7	(Malaysia) Fikri Amin	WTS	1
7	(Malaysia) Raja Amir Shah	Mahsa City	1
7	(Malaysia) Shaarveen Segaran	Bunga Raya	1
7	(Malaysia) Yusof Akma	YPM	1
7	(Malaysia) Zamir Zaini	Kuantan City	1
7	(Malaysia) Zulhilmi Rashid	Bunga Raya	1
7	(Malaysia) Zubir Zaihan	MP Port Dickson	1

== See also ==
- 2023 Piala Sumbangsih
- 2023 Malaysia Super League
- 2023 Malaysia M3 League
- 2023 Malaysia M5 League
- 2023 Malaysia FA Cup
- 2023 MFL Cup
