= Bunga Raya United F.C. =

Malaysian football club

BR United
- Full name: Bunga Raya United Football Club
- Short name: BR Utd
- Founded: 2022; 3 years ago, as Bunga Raya FC II
- Ground: Arena IRC, Bandar Sri Sendayan
- Capacity: 1,000
- Owner: Bunga Raya Group of Football

Bunga Raya United Football Club, simply known as BR United, is a Malaysian football club based in Port Dickson, Negeri Sembilan. It a subsidiary under the Bunga Raya Group of Football. It acts as feeder club of Bunga Raya.

== History ==
Founded in 2022, BR United competed in the 2023 RAFA Southern Selangor League and qualified to the 2024–25 Malaysia A2 Amateur League.

== Players (2024) ==
Note: Flags indicate national team as defined under FIFA eligibility rules; some limited exceptions apply. Players may hold more than one non-FIFA nationality.

No.	Pos.	Nation	Player
1	GK	MAS	Zulhelmi Rashid
2	MF	MAS	K. Shangerelingam
3	DF	MAS	Basyir Ahmadd Abdul Karim
4	DF	MAS	S. Sridhar
5	DF	MAS	Vegnesh Raj
6	DF	MAS	M. Dnesh
7	MF	MAS	M. Terrence
8	DF	MAS	K. Kesavakumar
10	MF	MAS	S. Gawsigan
11	FW	MAS	J. Leslee Nathan
12	MF	MAS	G. Manisharma
13	MF	MAS	M. Kalaiarasan
14	DF	MAS	T. Prem

No.	Pos.	Nation	Player
15	DF	MAS	Muhammad Danish Daniya
16	FW	MAS	Sharveswaren
17	MF	MAS	Thipanraj Subramaniam
18	DF	MAS	Nur Haziq Zakuan
19	FW	MAS	M. Thiyagu
21	MF	MAS	Muhammad Amier Amsyar
22	FW	MAS	M. Nesamani Chettiar
23	FW	MAS	K. Ravindran
26	GK	MAS	Kaharuddin Rahman
44	GK	MAS	P. Rakesh Raj
46	DF	MAS	Mohamad Adnan Mohamed Aslam
48	DF	MAS	Muhammad Haziq Amsyar
77	FW	MAS	Raja Amar Naqqiuddin
88	GK	MAS	Adli Mohd Ramli

== Team officials (2024) ==
- Team manager: Kuganeswaran a/l Loganathan
- Assistant team manager: Anbarasan a/l Devinderan
- Head coach: Syah Juan Bin Mohd Nor
- Assistant coaches: Sivamainthan a/l Bathumalai
- Goal keeper coach: Punithan a/l Vadivellu
- Physiotherapist: Arvinth a/l Ganesan
- Kitman: Lugithran a/l Balakrishnan

== Honours ==
=== League ===
- Nogori M5 League 2

(silver) Runners-up (1): 2022

- RAFA Southern Selangor League

(silver) Runners-up (1): 2023
