= Shafiq Al-Hafiz =

Malaysian footballer

Personal information
- Full name: Mohamad Shafiq Al-Hafiz bin Dawawi
- Date of birth: 12 February 1997 (age 29)
- Place of birth: Kelantan, Malaysia
- Height: 1.69 m (5 ft 6 1/2 in)
- Position: Midfielder

Team information
- Current team: Kelantan WTS
- Number: 27

Senior career*
Years	Team	Apps	(Gls)
2020–2021	UiTM	30	(1)
2022	Penang		
2022	Kelantan		
2023	Melaka		
2025–	Kelantan WTS		
- * Club domestic league appearances and goals

Mohamad Shafiq Al-Hafiz bin Dawawi (born 12 February 1997) is a Malaysian footballer who plays as a midfielder for Kelantan WTS.
