= MPPD F.C. =

Malaysian football club

Majlis Perbandaran Port Dickson
- Full name: Majlis Perbandaran Port Dickson Football Club
- Short name: MPPD
- Founded: 2011; 15 years ago
- Ground: Padang Merdeka, Port Dickson, Negeri Sembilan
- Capacity: 1,500
- Owner: Port Dickson Municipal Council
- Head coach: Khairul Anuar Baharom
- League: Malaysia A2 Amateur League
- 2025–26: Runners-up

Majlis Perbandaran Port Dickson Football Club (officially abbreviated as MPPD FC) is a Malaysian football club based in Port Dickson, Negeri Sembilan. The club represents the Port Dickson Municipal Council and currently competes in the Malaysian football league system, Malaysia A2 Amateur League. They play their home matches at Padang Merdeka in Port Dickson.

== History ==
MPPD FC was founded in 2011 by the Port Dickson Municipal Council (Malay: ms:Majlis Perbandaran Port Dickson) to promote football development and provide a competitive platform for local sports talent within the district. During its formative years, the club primarily participated in civil service competitions and regional state-level tournaments.

In 2019, the club transitioned to the national stage, making its debut in the preliminary rounds of the Malaysia FA Cup on 17 February 2019.

The club achieved a major competitive breakthrough in 2022 by winning the Nogori M5 League championship title. This victory secured them an automatic promotion to the national fourth-tier amateur division (the 2023 Malaysia M4 League, which was subsequently restructured into the Al-Ikhsan Cup).

During the 2023 and 2024 seasons, MPPD FC established themselves as competitive contenders in the national amateur tiers, securing consecutive semi-final finishes. In the 2025–26 season, the club participated in Group B of the revamped BubblesO2 Liga Premier Negeri Sembilan (the state's A3 Community League tier), concluding their campaign as league runners-up.

== Players ==
=== Current squad ===
As of 13 November 2026

Note: Flags indicate national team as defined under FIFA eligibility rules; some limited exceptions apply. Players may hold more than one non-FIFA nationality.

No.	Pos.	Nation	Player
1	GK	MAS	Nur Afiq Afandi (captain)
3	DF	MAS	Mohd Aliff Iskandar
4	DF	MAS	Darwish Mohd Fauzan
5	DF	MAS	Mohd Shahrul Azman
6	MF	MAS	Ku Muhammad Nazran
7	MF	MAS	Muhd Naqiuddin Amran
8	MF	MAS	Zulhelmi Roslan
9	MF	MAS	Aqeem Nur Ilham
10	FW	MAS	Faiz Mohamad Ismail
11	DF	MAS	Kuganeishvaran a/l Manoharan
12	DF	MAS	Fakhri Haidhar
13	MF	MAS	Faizal Talib
14	DF	MAS	Azari Derma Raju
15	MF	MAS	Tamilvanan a/l Shanmugam
16	MF	MAS	Zulhairy Hashim

No.	Pos.	Nation	Player
17	DF	MAS	Ikhwanfaris Ishak
18	MF	MAS	Adib Fahri Shahril
19	DF	MAS	Vishnu Naiker a/l Visvanathan
20	FW	MAS	Nurzaidi Bunari
22	GK	MAS	Amirul Asyraf Abdul Rahman
25	GK	MAS	Zahier Mohamad Zaki
28	MF	MAS	Zulfieqrie Aizam
30	MF	MAS	Bukhari Idris
31	MF	MAS	Logaa Palanivelu
36	MF	MAS	Yogin Raj a/l Kamala Nathan
46	MF	MAS	Putra Daniel Mohd Fairul
66	FW	MAS	Danish Mohd Fauzan
77	DF	MAS	Azli Azrul Ahmad Kamel
88	MF	MAS	Nazrin Aiman
93	FW	MAS	Ibrahim Suhaib Muhammad

== Management ==
Management
Position	Name
Team manager	(Malaysia) Mohd Shaiful bin Rahmat
Assistant manager	(Malaysia) Muhammad Syazwan bin Mahadi
Head coach	(Malaysia) Khairul Anuar Baharom
Assistant coach	(Malaysia) Hazrul Azrin bin Ishak (Malaysia) Muhammad Al Rifaie Amn bin Abdul Rahman
Goalkeeper coach	(Malaysia) Muhd Syahir bin Dzul Ghaffar
Physio	(Malaysia) Shaikh Mohamad Haznan bin Shaikh Hashim (Malaysia) Muhammad Azreen bin Zainuddin
Kitman	(Malaysia) Rahman bin Jonid (Malaysia) Mohd Fauzan Bin Zakaria (Malaysia) Muhammad Naim bin Abu Bakar

== Season by season record ==
Season	League									FA Cup	M Cup	C Cup	Top goalscorer (all competitions)	
Season	Division	P	W	D	L	F	A	Pts	Pos	FA Cup	M Cup	C Cup	Name	Goals
2019	M4 League	5	3	0	2	7	9	9	Second Round	Preliminary Round	DNQ	DNQ	unknown	—N/a
2020–21	M4 League	Cancelled due to COVID-19 pandemic												
2022	M5 League	11	8	2	1	28	8	26	Champions	Opted out	DNQ	DNQ	unknown	—N/a
2023	M4 League	10	6	4	0	26	8	22	Semi-final	Opted out	DNQ	DNQ	(Malaysia) Bukhari Idris	6
2024	A2 Amateur League	10	5	2	3	14	12	17	Semi-final	Opted out	DNQ	DNQ	(Malaysia) Ibrahim Suhaib Muhammad	4
2025–26	A3 Community League	9	5	2	2	22	10	17	Runner-up	Opted out	DNQ	DNQ	(Malaysia) Danish Fauzan	5

Champions	Runners-up	Promoted	Relegated

== Honours ==
=== Domestic competitions ===
==== League ====
- Division 5/Nogori M5 League
  - Winners (1) : 2022
- Division 5/Negeri Sembilan Premier League
  - Runners-up (1): 2025–26
- Division 4/A2 Amateur League
  - Third place (2): 2023 & 2024
