= SJ Virtuosos F.C. =

Malaysian football club

SJ Virtuosos
- Full name: SJ Virtuosos Football Club
- Short name: SJV
- Founded: January 2023; 2 years ago
- Ground: Sepang Municipal Council Mini Stadium, Sepang
- Head coach: Khairulbahar Bin Taib
- League: Malaysia A2 Amateur League
- 2024–25: Quarter-finalist

SJ Virtuosos Football Club, simply known as SJ Virtuosos, is a Malaysian football club based in Putrajaya, Federal Territories of Malaysia. It plays in the third tier of the Malaysian football league system, the Malaysia A2 Amateur League.

== History ==
Founded in January 2023, SJ Virtuosos joined competitions organised by the Putrajaya Football Association, the Putrajaya League. In the inaugural year, they competed in the Putrajaya League and emerged as champions, securing promotion to the Malaysia A2 Amateur League for the 2024–25 season.

In the 2024–25 Malaysia A2 Amateur League season, SJ Virtuosos reached the quarter-finals. Their top scorer for the season was Faris Hafiz Azhar, who netted 11 goals across all competitions. SJ Virtuosos FC's rapid ascent in Malaysian football showcases their commitment to developing local talent and competing at higher levels. Their journey from a newly formed club to quarter-finalists in the A2 Amateur League within a short span is a testament to their dedication and ambition.

== Players ==
=== First-team squad ===
As of 19 July 2024

Note: Flags indicate national team as defined under FIFA eligibility rules; some limited exceptions apply. Players may hold more than one non-FIFA nationality.

No.	Pos.	Nation	Player
3	DF	MAS	Mohamad Faizul Azizi
4	MF	MAS	Muhammad Israff
5	DF	MAS	Normazril Harith Haiqel
6	DF	MAS	Muhammad Naufal Na’im
7	MF	MAS	Muhammad Fazrul
8	MF	MAS	Muhammad Ashraf Razali
10	FW	MAS	Muhammad Nazrien Faizal
11	MF	MAS	Zakwan Zamri
12	GK	MAS	Muhammad Rafiq Kamaruddin
13	GK	MAS	Muhammad Faridz
14	MF	MAS	Amir Firdaus Abdull Fatah
16	FW	MAS	Ibrahim Syaihul

No.	Pos.	Nation	Player
19	MF	MAS	Muhammad Afif Ikhwanul
20	DF	MAS	Mohamad Haziq Mohd Noh
21	MF	MAS	Meer Adam Shah
22	DF	MAS	Muhammad Danial Hariz
23	MF	MAS	Muhamad Islah Badri
24	DF	MAS	Muhamad Akmal Abdullah
25	MF	MAS	Muhammad Khair Rifqi
26	DF	MAS	Muhamad Farees Ismail
27	MF	MAS	Muhammad Fariduddin Zainal
28	MF	MAS	Muhammad Faris Hafiz
30	FW	MAS	Muhammad Asnan Awal Hisham
33	GK	MAS	Mohd Ariff Baharoom

== Technical staff ==
As of 19 July 2024

- Team manager: Zainul Mashi Bin Mohd Fathil
- Assistant team manager: Firhin Asykil Mashi Bin Zainul Mashi
- Head coach: Khairulbahar Bin Taib
- Assistant coaches: Badrul Hisham Bin Abdul Halil
- Goalkeeper coach: Mohamad Esham Bin A Hamid
- Physio: Muhammad Zahin Hilmy Bin Manzali
- Team media: Khairil Mashi Bin Mohamed Fathil
- Kitman: Jahabahali Bin Mohd Hussan

== Season by season record ==
Season	Division	Position	Malaysia Cup	Malaysian FA Cup	Malaysian Charity Shield	Regional	Top scorer (all competitions)
2023	M5 League	Champions	DNQ	DNQ	–	–	
2024	A2 League	Quarter-finalist	DNQ	DNQ	–	–	(Malaysia) Faris Hafiz Azhar (11)

== Honours ==
=== League ===
- Putrajaya League

(gold) Winners (1): 2023
