= JAKIM FC =

Malaysian football club

JAKIM
- Full name: Jabatan Kemajuan Islam Malaysia Football Club
- Short name: JAKIM
- Founded: 2019; 7 years ago
- Ground: MMU Stadium, Cyberjaya
- Capacity: 1,000
- Owner: Department of Islamic Development Malaysia
- Head coach: Mohd Nazim Bin Din
- League: Malaysia A3 Community League
- 2024–25: 5th (South Zone), expelled

Jabatan Kemajuan Islam Malaysia Football Club, simply known as JAKIM FC, is a Malaysian football club based in Putrajaya. It plays in the fourth tier of the Malaysian football league system, the Malaysia A3 Community League.

== History ==
Founded in 2019, JAKIM FC joined competitions organised by the Putrajaya Football Association. In 2022 Malaysia M5 League the club became the champion. JAKIM FC was promoted to 2023 Malaysia M4 League (currently Malaysia A2 League) and finish in Quarter-final stage.

== Season by season record ==
Season	Division	Position	Malaysia Cup	Malaysian FA Cup	Malaysian Charity Shield	Regional	Top scorer (all competitions)
2019	Liga M5	Champions	DNQ	DNQ	–	–	
2020 & 2021	Liga M5		cancelled and declared null and void due to COVID-19 pandemic				
2022	Liga M5	Champions	DNQ	DNQ	–	–	
2023	Liga M4	Quarter-finals	DNQ	DNQ	–	–	(Malaysia) Arisazri Juhari (11 goals)
2024–25	Liga A2	Fifth place (South Zone)	DNQ	DNQ	–	–	(Malaysia) Fakru Faiz (6 goals)

Notes:'

^1 Season cancelled due to the COVID-19 pandemic.

== Players ==
=== First-team squad ===
As of 19 July 2024

Note: Flags indicate national team as defined under FIFA eligibility rules; some limited exceptions apply. Players may hold more than one non-FIFA nationality.

No.	Pos.	Nation	Player
1	GK	MAS	Muhamma Arif Haikal
2	DF	MAS	Harith Syazwan Azli
7	DF	MAS	Muhammad Hafizan Zamin
8	DF	MAS	Mohd Fakru Faiz
10	DF	MAS	Muhammad Azamuddin
12	DF	MAS	Farid Ashraf Kamarozaman
13	MF	MAS	Mohamad Ikmal Rizal
14	MF	MAS	Amirul Dzikry Che Ros
16	FW	MAS	Muhd Nor Saiful
17	MF	MAS	Elman Abid Hasmandin
18	MF	MAS	Amar Nazmi Abdul Aziz
19	DF	MAS	Muhamad Danish Haiqal
22	DF	MAS	Faris Syazwan Mohd
23	DF	MAS	Mohamad Hafizi

No.	Pos.	Nation	Player
27	MF	MAS	Lokman Hakim Saifuddin
34	MF	MAS	Badrul Amin Rusalan
38	MF	MAS	Muhammad Izzat Zikri
44	FW	MAS	Khairul Faizzuhri
46	GK	MAS	Kamarul Aidif Syazmel
49	DF	MAS	Mohd Izzuan Ikmal
55	MF	MAS	Ahmad Azim Aniq
66	FW	MAS	Muhammad Danish Haikal
67	GK	MAS	Muhammad Badrul Amin
69	GK	MAS	Muhammad Syahizzat
77	MF	MAS	Shaiful Nasa Shahirudean
88	FW	MAS	Amir Hazman
98	GK	MAS	Ahmad Firdaus Roslan
99	GK	MAS	Ranngi Oftawan Osman

== Technical staff ==
As of 19 July 2024

- Team manager: Muhammad Affendy Bin Razali
- Assistant team manager: Wan Mohd Hafidz Bin Wan Hamat
- Head coach: Mohd Nazim Bin Din
- Assistant coach: Khairuddin Akmal Bin Mohamad Kamal, Amzar Iman Bin Latib
- Goalkeeper coach: Zailani Abu Bakar
- Physio: Putra Asyran Naim Bin Khaizal Ozle
- Kitman: Wan Mohamad Fauzi Bin Mahamud

== Honours ==
=== Domestic competitions ===
==== League ====
- Division 5/A3 League/Putrajaya League

(gold) Winners (2) 2019, 2022

- Putrajaya KPPA League

(silver) Runners-up (1): 2019
