= Bunga Raya F.C. =

Malaysian football club

Bunga Raya
- Full name: Bunga Raya Football Club
- Short name: BRFC
- Founded: 2002; 24 years ago
- Ground: Arena IRC, Bandar Sri Sendayan; Tuanku Abdul Rahman Stadium, Paroi
- Capacity: 1,000; 45,000
- Owner: Bunga Raya Group of Football
- Head coach: Azzmi bin Ab Aziz
- League: Malaysia A1 Semi-Pro League
- 2025–26: Malaysia A1 Semi-Pro League, 12th of 16
- Website: Official website
Home colours	Away colours

Bunga Raya Football Club is a Malaysian professional football club based in Port Dickson, Negeri Sembilan. They currently compete in the Malaysia A1 Semi-Pro League, the second tier of Malaysian football. The club's home ground is Arena IRC, Bandar Sri Sendayan.

== History ==
The club was founded in 2002 by the Bunga Raya Group of Football. For its first two decades, BRFC operated primarily at the grassroots and local amateur levels in Negeri Sembilan. The club entered the official Malaysian football pyramid by joining the fifth-tier Nogori M5 League in 2022. They finished as runners-up in their debut season, securing a promotion to the Malaysia M4 League. Competing in the fourth-tier (Al-Ikhsan Cup), the team reached the quarter-finals, earning another consecutive promotion.

=== Rebranding & Split ===
Ahead of the 2024–25 season season, the club partnered with the Damansara Sports Group, shifting their base to Selangor and playing under the name Bunga Raya Damansara FC. Bolstered by former PJ City professional players like Kogileswaran Raj and K. Gurusamy, they achieved a impressive 4th-place finish in the Malaysia A1 Semi-Pro League. However, the ownership groups split before the next season; the Damansara branch rebranded as UM-Damansara United, while the original team returned to its roots as Bunga Raya FC back in Negeri Sembilan.

=== Recent Years (2026) ===
Managed by Azzmi Aziz, the club solidifies its status in the Malaysia A1 Semi-Pro League. In July 2026, the club successfully obtained an Extraordinary National License from the Malaysian Football League (MFL) to apply for a Malaysia Super League slot, securing close to RM4 million in sponsorship, though they were ultimately not selected for the top-flight expansion.

Crest of Bunga Raya Damansara FC (2024–25)

== Players ==
=== Current squad ===
As of August 2026

Note: Flags indicate national team as defined under FIFA eligibility rules; some limited exceptions apply. Players may hold more than one non-FIFA nationality.

No.	Pos.	Nation	Player
6	MF	ALG	Mohamed Chamseddine Amara
8	MF	MAS	Amirul Izwan^{U22}
9	MF	MAS	Nik Muhammad Aqib^{U22}
10	FW	GHA	Aminu Maiga
11	FW	MAS	Aqil Arazi Aziz
14	DF	MAS	Muhd Syukri Azman
16	DF	MAS	Che Mohd Arif
17	DF	MAS	Nasrullah Haniff
18	FW	MAS	Vishnu A/L Jegan^{U22}
19	GK	MAS	Ridzuan Azali
20	FW	MAS	Aqil Hazwan
21	DF	MAS	Harish Thigarajah^{U22}
23	MF	MAS	S. Veenod

No.	Pos.	Nation	Player
26	DF	MAS	Fandi Othman (captain)
27	DF	MAS	Azarul Nazarith
28	DF	MAS	Dhia Ramadhan Badrulhisham
30	GK	MAS	Syakir Danial
32	GK	MAS	Muhaimin Mohamad
35	MF	MAS	Afif Jazimin
45	FW	MAS	Hakimy Mohd Khairol^{U22}
47	FW	MAS	Kaviraj A/L Sankaran^{U22}
66	DF	MAS	Alif Ezzahan Zulkifli^{U22}
70	MF	MAS	Shafi Azswad Sapari
77	DF	MAS	Kama Edyka Azhar
88	MF	KOR	Youngju Soung
96	FW	MAS	Dalan Rajendran

== Technical staff ==
As of August 2026

Position	Name
Team manager	(Malaysia) Kuganeswaran Loganathan
Assistant manager	(Malaysia) Yuvaraja Perumal
Head coach	(Malaysia) Azzmi bin Ab Aziz
Assistant coach	(Malaysia) Zurin Adra Azhar
Goalkeeping coach	(Malaysia) Muhammad Hamdan Bin Sairi
Fitness coach	(Malaysia) Ishak Ahmad@Lah
Physio	(Malaysia) Maahesh Pereabaher
Media officer	(Malaysia) Thinesh Sukumaran
Kitman	(Malaysia) Ravindran a/l Krishnan

== Kit manufacturers and shirt sponsors ==
Season	Manufacturer	Sponsor
2022	Kimicom Jersey	Sakti Sari Sdn. Bhd.
2023	Kimicom Jersey	Sakti Sari Sdn. Bhd.
2024–25	Kovra	MBSB Bank
2025–	Kimicom Jersey	Bunga Raya Group

== Season by season record ==
Season	League									FA Cup	M Cup	C Cup	Top goalscorer (all competitions)	
Season	Division	P	W	D	L	F	A	Pts	Pos	FA Cup	M Cup	C Cup	Name	Goals
2022	Nogori M5 League	11	9	1	1	40	4	28	Quarter-finalist	Opted out	DNQ	DNQ	unknown	
2023	Malaysia M4 League	10	6	3	1	32	9	21	Quarter-finalist	Opted out	DNQ	DNQ	(Malaysia) K. Ravindran	10
2024–25	A1 Semi-Pro League	28	17	4	7	60	26	55	4th of 15	Opted out	DNQ	DNQ	(Malaysia) Kogileswaran Raj	12
2025–26	A1 Semi-Pro League	28	7	2	19	21	56	23	12th of 16	Round of 16	DNQ	DNQ	(Nigeria) Emmanuel Samson Kella	5
2026–27	A1 Semi-Pro League	0	0	0	0	0	0	0	TBD	Opted out	TBD	TBD	TBD	TBD

Champions	Runners-up	Third place	Promoted	Relegated

== Honours ==
=== League ===
- Nogori M5 League/A3 Community League

(silver) Runners-up (1): 2022
