= K. Ravindran =

Malaysian footballer

Personal information
- Full name: Ravindran a/l Krishnan
- Date of birth: 1 October 1989 (age 37)
- Place of birth: Port Dickson, Negeri Sembilan, Malaysia
- Height: 1.77 m (5 ft 9 1/2 in)
- Position: Striker

Youth career
- 2007–2009: Negeri Sembilan FA
- 2010–2011: Harimau Muda A

Senior career*
Years	Team	Apps	(Gls)
2009	Negeri Sembilan	10	(8)
2010–2011	Harimau Muda A	25	(17)
2012	Sarawak	28	(16)
2013	Sime Darby	10	(8)
2014	PBAPP	20	(16)
2016–2017	MISC-MIFA	18	(8)
2017–2018	Felcra		
2019–2022	KSR Sains		
2023–2024	Bunga Raya		
2024–2025	Bunga Raya United		

International career^{‡}
2009–2011	Malaysia U21	8	(5)
- * Club domestic league appearances and goals ‡ National team caps and goals as of January 24, 2017

K. Ravindran (born 1 October 1989 in Port Dickson) is a Malaysian professional footballer.
