= Malaysia A3 Community League =

- Organising body: Malaysian Football League
- Country: Malaysia
- Confederation: AFC
- Number of clubs: Various
- Level on pyramid: 4
- Promotion to: Malaysia A2 Amateur League
- Relegation to: Various
- Broadcaster(s): AFL (YouTube)
- Website: the-afl.my
- Current: 2026–27 Malaysia A3 Community League

The Malaysia A3 Community League (Malay: Liga A3 Community, previously known as the Malaysia M5 League) makes up level 4 of 9 community-based leagues under the Malaysian football league system. It was created in 2018 as a part of the Malaysian Football League's plan to reform the domestic football structure. It consists of various state FA's, community and social leagues.

== Overview ==
A certain number of clubs can rise to a higher league, whilst those that finish at the bottom can sink to lower leagues. In addition to sporting performance, promotion is contingent on meeting criteria set by the higher league.

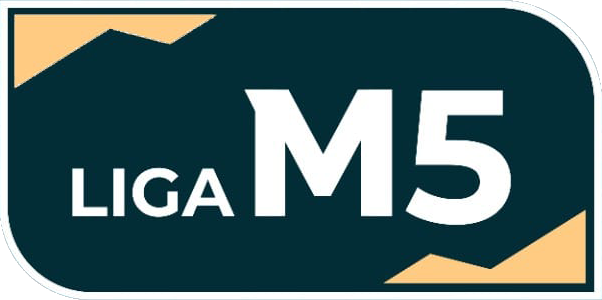
Previous logo

== Establishment and format ==
- Each state, district, or city runs its own A3 Community League under the supervision of the Amateur Football League (AFL), branded depending on the region
- The leagues run independently in their zones, but follow a unified guideline for promotion eligibility to the Malaysia A2 Amateur League
- Clubs are divided into groups (pools) of 4–8
- Top clubs from each group advance to single-elimination quarterfinals or semifinals

== League system ==
States & Federal Territories	Operated by	Level 4	Level 5	Level 6	Level 7	Level 8	Level 9
Perlis	FA Perlis	Perlis Super League	—N/a				
Kedah	FA Kedah	Liga THB-KFA	—N/a				
Penang	FA Penang	FAP League Division 1	FAP League Division 2	FAP League Division 3	—N/a		
Perak	FA Perak	Perak League	—N/a				
Selangor	FA Selangor	Selangor Champions League	FAS Super League	FAS Premier League	FAS League Division One	FAS League Division Two	Joma FAS League
Selangor	FA Selangor	Selangor Champions League	AXA Klang Valley League KVL Division 1	KVL (City Center) Division 2	KVL (City Center) Division 3	—N/a	
Selangor	FA Selangor	Selangor Champions League	AXA Klang Valley League KVL Division 1	KVL (Petaling Jaya) Division 2	KVL (Petaling Jaya) Division 3	KVL (Petaling Jaya) Division 4	—N/a
Selangor	FA Selangor	Selangor Champions League	AXA Klang Valley League KVL Division 1	KVL (Cyberjaya) Division 2	KVL (Cyberjaya) Division 3	—N/a	
Selangor	FA Selangor	Selangor Champions League	AXA Klang Valley League KVL Division 1	KVL (Shah Alam) Division 2	KVL (Shah Alam) Division 3	KVL (Shah Alam) Division 4	KVL (Shah Alam) Division 5
Selangor	FA Selangor	Selangor Champions League	Shah Alam League	—N/a			
Selangor	FA Selangor	Selangor Champions League	Subang Football League	—N/a			
Selangor	FA Selangor	Selangor Champions League	Sunarize Soccer League	Sunarize Soccer League Division 2	—N/a		
Selangor	FA Selangor	Selangor Champions League	Selangor Social Premier League	SSPL (Gombak) Division 2	—N/a		
Selangor	FA Selangor	Selangor Champions League	Selangor Social Premier League	SSPL (Damansara) Division 2	—N/a		
Selangor	FA Selangor	Selangor Champions League	Puchong Community League	—N/a			
Selangor	FA Selangor	Selangor Champions League	South Selangor League	—N/a			
Selangor	FA Selangor	Selangor Champions League	Shah Sport League	—N/a			
Selangor	FA Selangor	Selangor Champions League	A Ligue Champions League	—N/a			
Selangor	FA Selangor	Selangor Champions League	MAHSA A3 Community League	—N/a			
Federal Territories	FA Kuala Lumpur	KLFA Super League	KLFA Premier League (Division 1)	KLFA Premier League (Division 2)	—N/a		
Putrajaya	FA Putrajaya	Putrajaya A3 Community League	—N/a				
Negeri Sembilan	FA Negeri Sembilan	Negeri Sembilan Premier League	—N/a				
Melaka	FA Melaka	Melaka League Division 1 A3 Community League	Melaka League Division Two	Melaka League Division Three	—N/a		
Johor	FA Johor	Johor Darul Ta’zim League	—N/a				
Johor	Johor Bahru FA	JBFA Super League	JBFA Premier League	—N/a			
Pahang	FA Pahang	Pahang Amateur League	—N/a				
Terengganu	FA Terengganu	Terengganu Super League	Terengganu Premier League	—N/a			
Kelantan	FA Kelantan	PUC A3 Kelantan Champions League	—N/a				
Sabah	FA Sabah	V Liga Kota Kinabalu	—N/a				
Sarawak	FA Sarawak	Sarawak Premier League	—N/a				

== Clubs ==
The member clubs of the Malaysia A3 Community League for the 2025–26 season are listed below.

A Ligue Champions League	MAHSA A3 Community League	Putrajaya A3 Community League	Pahang Amateur League	Perlis Super League	Negeri Sembilan Premier League
Alti Genius; Arslan; Asawa; Bawean City; Budak Baru Nak Up; Carabat; Catalans Empire; Damansara Bulls; Gemilang; HE Clinic; Klang Valley Comrade; Kuala Lumpur Passion; Loyal Troopers; Masjid Bandar Tun Hussein Onn; Nadi Sepang; Neo X; Obi & Friends; OSV UK; Perakan Nilai; Puncak Alam United; Rantau KL; Scarecrow; Shah Alam Antlers; Sri Ampang Bootboys Club; Young Falcons	Grass Master; MAHSA City FC; MARS; MBPJ; Meba; MY FC; Rimbayu; Shah Alam Legacy; Takiko Saujana Putra	APM FC; Arslan; HE Clinic; LP United; Putra Gathers; Putracyber; Putrajaya FA U21; Putrajaya United; Sungai Merab; Superfriends	Aby55 Jengka; Bentong City; Darul Makmur United; Doesata United; FC Jerantut; GCMA; Gelanggi; Gelora Old Boys; Heero Academy; MFT; Pasir Sia; Pulau Tawar; Real Kuantan; RFX United; Sebertak; Seri Bukit; Siantan; Sri Tonkin; STW Jelai; Temerloh Jaya Rovers; Twentyfour; Wagga Temerloh	Anak Nelayan Kuala Perlis; Anas Sanglang; Arau City; Bintong FC II; Juang Titans Kangar; KSMR Kangar Unity-Singa Muda; Stormz Padang Besar	Chembong; Flamingo; Flizzie; Jalor; Jempol Dreams; Lakai; MBS FC; MPPD; N Nine; Negeri Sembilan United; NS Forces Warriors; NSIA; Randuk United; Seremban City; Seremban United; TAFT; Tampoi; Thivy Jaya SC; Teck Hin-KR II; YNS FC

== Champions ==
Year	League	Champions
2022	A Ligue Amisi Physio	OSV UK F.C.
2022	MAHSA-KRONOS M5 League	Republic of Borneo F.C.
2022	Kuantan Amateur League	YPM FC
2022	Nogori M5 League 1	MPPD F.C.
2022	Nogori M5 League 2	Harini FT II
2022	Piala Dato Verdon Bahanda	GP F.C.
2022	S Ligue M5 Sarawak	AS United F.C.
2022	Ligue M5 Bintulu	SDP Project Park F.C.
2022	Putrajaya League	JAKIM FC
2023	S Ligue M5 Sarawak	Maqarize II
2023	V Ligue Kota Kinabalu	Tenang F.C.
2023	A-Ligue Champions League M5	Northern Merbau F.C.
2023	RAFA Southern Selangor League	Raja Alias Serting F.C.
2023	Citi League	Sky United F.C.
2023	Footy Premier League M5	UiTM NS F.C.
2023	MAHSA-KRONOS M5 League	Gombak City
2023	KLFA M5 League	Kampong Ku
2023	Putrajaya League M5	SJ Virtuosos
2023	Liga Mahkota Pekan M5	FC Belacan U23
2023	Pahang Amateur League	Parot F.C.
2023	PBDLMS M5 League	MPM FC
2023	Manjung Football League M5	TNB Janamanjung Kilat F.C.
2023	Perlis Super League	Guar Syed Alwi
2023	A-Ligue Nismilan	Ayrish F.C.
2024–25	Melaka A3 Community Super League (Series 1)	Sungai Putat F.C.
2024–25	Melaka A3 Community League (Division 1)	MBMB Warriors F.C.
2024–25	Negeri Sembilan A3 Community Super League	Ayrish F.C.
2024–25	Seremban Football A3 Community League	PUSEN KSRNS
2024–25	SFL–UiTM NS A3 Community League	UiTM NS F.C.
2024–25	Perlis Super League	Bintong F.C.
2024–25	PUC A3 Kelantan Champions League	Jebeng F.C.
2024–25	Pahang Amateur League	Raub F.C.
2024–25	A Ligue Champions League	Baarz F.C.
2024–25	MAHSA A3 Community League	FR One Four F.C.
2024–25	Putrajaya A3 Community League	MOF-Sg. Merab FC
2025–26	A Ligue Champions League	Obi & Friends F.C.
2025–26	MAHSA A3 Community League	MARS F.C.
2025–26	Putrajaya A3 Community League	HE Clinic F.C.
2025–26	Pahang Amateur League	Gelora Old Boys F.C.
2025–26	Perlis Super League	Juang Titan Kayang F.C.
2025–26	Negeri Sembilan Premier League	Teck Hin-KR II
2025–26	Sarawak Premier League	Bintulu FA

== See also ==
- Malaysia FA Cup
- Malaysia Cup
- FAM Football Awards
