= 2025–26 Malaysia A3 Community League =

Malaysia A3 Community League
- Season: 2025–26
- Dates: June 2025 – May 2026

The 2025–26 Malaysia A3 Community League (Malay: Liga Komuniti A3 Malaysia) is the fourth season of the Malaysia A3 Community League, the 4th of 9 football leagues in the Malaysian football league system. Each state, district, or city runs its own A3 Community League under the supervision of the Amateur Football League (AFL). The leagues run independently in their zones, but follow a unified guideline for promotion eligibility to the Malaysia A2 Amateur League.

== Team changes ==
The following teams have changed division since the 2025–26 season.

| ▲ Promoted to A2 League | ▼ Relegated from A2 League |
|---|---|
| (Perlis) Bintong; Kuala Perlis Titans; (Kelantan) AZM Rovers; (Selangor) Sungai Merab; (Pahang) Raub; (Pahang) Kuantan City; (Malacca) MBMB Warriors; (Malacca) Duyong Fighters; (Negeri Sembilan) PUSEN Hornet; (Negeri Sembilan) Teck Hin; (Negeri Sembilan) NS Forces Warrior | (Negeri Sembilan) BR United; (Putrajaya) JAKIM; (Selangor) MAHSA United; (Negeri Sembilan) MP Port Dickson; (Selangor) NBK Empire; (Perak) Pencinta Setia; (Negeri Sembilan) Real Mambau; (Malacca) SAMB; (Selangor) Selayang City; (Pahang) Semantan Troopers; (Putrajaya) SJ Virtuosos |

Notes

1. PUSEN KSRNS (PUS): changed name to PUSEN Hornet.
2. 24 Warrior (WAR): changed name to NS Forces Warriors.
3. Teck Hin (TEK): changed name to Teck Hin-KR.

== Teams ==
The table below shows the number of teams participating in the 5 zonal leagues and the number of slots allocated to each league for the 2026–27 Malaysia A2 Amateur League.

Central Zone
| State/Community leagues | PT | PS | Winner | Runner-Up | Promoted |
|---|---|---|---|---|---|
| (Selangor) A Ligue Champions League | 25 | 1 | Obi & Friends FC | Neo X FC | None |
| (Selangor) MAHSA A3 Community League | 9 | 1 | MARS FC | Grass Master FC | None |
| FA Selangor League | did not participate | | | | |
| Putrajaya A3 Community League | 10 | 1 | HE Clinic FC | Sungai Merab | None |
| FA Kuala Lumpur | did not participate | | | | |

East Coast Zone
| State/Community leagues | PT | PS | Winner | Runner-Up | Promoted |
|---|---|---|---|---|---|
| PUC A3 Kelantan Champions League | Not held | | | | |
| Pahang Amateur League | 22 | 1 | Gelora Old Boys FC | RFX United FC | STW Jelai |
| FA Terengganu | Not held | | | | |

North Zone
| State/Community leagues | PT | PS | Winner | Runner-Up | Promoted |
|---|---|---|---|---|---|
| Perlis Super League | 6 | 1 | Juang Titan Kayang FC | Bintong FC II | None |
| FA Penang | did not participate | | | | |
| FA Kedah | Not held | | | | |
| FA Perak | did not participate | | | | |

South Zone
| State/Community leagues | PT | PS | Winner | Runner-Up | Promoted |
|---|---|---|---|---|---|
| (Malacca) Melaka A3 Community League (Division 1) | Not held | | | | |
| Negeri Sembilan Premier League | 20 | 2 | TH-KR FC II | MPPD | MPPD Seremban United |
| FA Johor | Not held | | | | |

Borneo Zone
| State/Community leagues | PT | PS | Winner | Runner-Up | Promoted |
|---|---|---|---|---|---|
| Sarawak Premier League | did not participate | | | | |
| FA Sabah | did not participate | | | | |

Notes:

- PT (participating teams): Total number of teams participating in each league
- PS (promotion slots): Number of slots allocated to each league for the A2 Amateur League

== Negeri Sembilan Premier League ==
Negeri Sembilan Premier League
- Season: 2025–26
- Champions: TH-KR FC II
- Promoted: MPPD; Seremban United

=== Group A ===
| Pos | Team | Pld | W | D | L | GF | GA | GD | Pts | Promotion, qualification or relegation |
|---|---|---|---|---|---|---|---|---|---|---|
| 1 | TH-KR FC II | 9 | 9 | 0 | 0 | 40 | 2 | +38 | 27 | Advance to Knock-out stage |
| 2 | Seremban United | 9 | 6 | 2 | 1 | 30 | 10 | +20 | 20 | Advance to Knock-out stage |
| 3 | Negeri Sembilan United | 9 | 5 | 2 | 2 | 23 | 10 | +13 | 17 | Advance to Knock-out stage |
| 4 | NS Forces Warriors II | 9 | 4 | 3 | 2 | 20 | 12 | +8 | 15 | Advance to Knock-out stage |
| 5 | Flizzie FC | 9 | 5 | 0 | 4 | 18 | 22 | −4 | 15 | |
| 6 | TAFT | 9 | 2 | 3 | 4 | 6 | 17 | −11 | 9 | |
| 7 | Randuk United | 9 | 1 | 4 | 4 | 10 | 15 | −5 | 7 | |
| 8 | NS Indian Association | 9 | 2 | 1 | 6 | 6 | 35 | −29 | 7 | |
| 9 | Seremban City | 9 | 2 | 0 | 7 | 8 | 26 | −18 | 6 | |
| 10 | Thivy Jaya Sports Club | 9 | 1 | 1 | 7 | 19 | 31 | −12 | 4 | |

Updated to match(es) played on 28 June 2026. Source: Persatuan Bolasepak Negeri Sembilan - PBNS
Rules for classification: 1) Points; 2) Goal difference; 3) Number of goals scored.

=== Group B ===
| Pos | Team | Pld | W | D | L | GF | GA | GD | Pts | Promotion, qualification or relegation |
|---|---|---|---|---|---|---|---|---|---|---|
| 1 | Jempol Dreams | 9 | 7 | 1 | 1 | 18 | 14 | +4 | 22 | Advance to Knock-out stage |
| 2 | N Nine | 9 | 5 | 3 | 1 | 23 | 7 | +16 | 18 | Advance to Knock-out stage |
| 3 | MPPD | 9 | 5 | 2 | 2 | 22 | 10 | +12 | 17 | Advance to Knock-out stage |
| 4 | YNS FC | 9 | 5 | 1 | 3 | 25 | 10 | +15 | 16 | Advance to Knock-out stage |
| 5 | Tampoi | 9 | 5 | 1 | 3 | 23 | 10 | +13 | 16 | |
| 6 | Jalor | 9 | 4 | 3 | 2 | 17 | 16 | +1 | 15 | |
| 7 | MBS FC | 9 | 3 | 2 | 4 | 21 | 14 | +7 | 11 | |
| 8 | Chembong | 9 | 2 | 3 | 4 | 13 | 9 | +4 | 9 | |
| 9 | Lakai FC | 9 | 0 | 1 | 8 | 3 | 33 | −30 | 1 | |
| 10 | Flamingo | 9 | 0 | 1 | 8 | 4 | 46 | −42 | 1 | |

Updated to match(es) played on 30 June 2025. Source: Persatuan Bolasepak Negeri Sembilan - PBNS
Rules for classification: 1) Points; 2) Goal difference; 3) Number of goals scored.

=== Knock-out stage ===
Quarterfinals
TH-KR FC II | 3
YNS FC | 0
N Nine | 2
Negeri Sembilan United | 0
Jempol Dreams | 2 (5)
NS Forces Warriors II | 2 (4)
Seremban United | 0
MPPD FC | 1

Semifinals
TH-KR FC II | 3
N Nine | 1
Jempol Dreams | 0 (6)
MPPD FC | 0 (7)

Final
TH-KR FC II | 5
MPPD | 2
Third place play-off
N Nine | 5 (7)
Jempol Dreams | 5 (6)

=== Quarter-final ===
| 6 July 2026 | TH-KR FC II | 3–0 | YNS FC | Seremban |
| 20:00 UTC+8 | | Report | | Stadium: PBNS BubblesO2 Arena |

| 6 July 2026 | Seremban United | 0–1 | MPPD | Seremban |
| 22:30 UTC+8 | | Report | | Stadium: PBNS BubblesO2 Arena |

| 7 July 2026 | Jempol Dreams | 2–2 (5–4 p) | NS Forces Warriors II | Seremban |
| 20:00 UTC+8 | | Report | | Stadium: PBNS BubblesO2 Arena |

| 7 July 2026 | N Nine | 2–0 | Negeri Sembilan United | Seremban |
| 22:30 UTC+8 | | Report | | Stadium: PBNS BubblesO2 Arena |

=== Semi-final ===
| 12 July 2026 | Teck Hin-KR II | 3–1 | N Nine | Seremban |
| 20:00 UTC+8 | | Report | | Stadium: PBNS BubblesO2 Arena |

| 12 July 2026 | Jempol Dreams | 0–0 (6–7 p) | MPPD FC | Seremban |
| 22:30 UTC+8 | | Report | | Stadium: PBNS BubblesO2 Arena |

=== Final ===
26 July 2026
16:15 UTC+8

| TH-KR FC II | 5–2 | MPPD |
|---|---|---|
| | Report |

Tampin Mini Stadium, Tampin

== MAHSA A3 Community League ==
MAHSA A3 Community League
- Season: 2025–26
- Champions: MARS FC

| Pos | Team | Pld | W | D | L | GF | GA | GD | Pts |
|---|---|---|---|---|---|---|---|---|---|
| 1 | MARS FC (C) | 8 | 6 | 1 | 1 | 26 | 6 | +20 | 19 |
| 2 | Grass Master FC | 8 | 5 | 3 | 0 | 15 | 4 | +11 | 18 |
| 3 | MBPJ | 8 | 5 | 3 | 0 | 32 | 4 | +28 | 18 |
| 4 | Meba FC | 8 | 4 | 2 | 2 | 14 | 13 | +1 | 14 |
| 5 | Rimbayu FC | 8 | 3 | 2 | 3 | 15 | 21 | −6 | 11 |
| 6 | MAHSA City FC | 8 | 2 | 2 | 4 | 11 | 12 | −1 | 8 |
| 7 | Shah Alam Legacy FC | 8 | 2 | 1 | 5 | 11 | 24 | −13 | 7 |
| 8 | Takiko Saujana Putra FC | 8 | 1 | 0 | 7 | 8 | 18 | −10 | 3 |
| 9 | MY FC | 8 | 1 | 0 | 7 | 6 | 26 | −20 | 3 |

Updated to match(es) played on 14 February 2026. Source: MAHSA Recreation and Sports Centre
Rules for classification: 1) Points; 2) Goal difference; 3) Number of goals scored.
(C) Champions

== Putrajaya A3 Community League ==
Putrajaya A3 Community League
- Season: 2025–26
- Champions: HE Clinic FC

| Pos | Team | Pld | W | D | L | GF | GA | GD | Pts | Promotion, qualification or relegation |
|---|---|---|---|---|---|---|---|---|---|---|
| 1 | HE Clinic FC (C) | 8 | 8 | 0 | 0 | 67 | 6 | +61 | 24 | |
| 2 | Sungai Merab FC | 9 | 7 | 1 | 1 | 41 | 12 | +29 | 22 | Promotion to A2 Amateur League |
| 3 | Arslan FC | 9 | 7 | 0 | 2 | 30 | 11 | +19 | 21 | |
| 4 | Putrajaya FA U21 FC | 8 | 5 | 1 | 2 | 37 | 11 | +26 | 16 | |
| 5 | Putra Gathers FC | 9 | 5 | 0 | 4 | 32 | 20 | +12 | 15 | |
| 6 | APM FC | 9 | 4 | 0 | 5 | 29 | 23 | +6 | 12 | |
| 7 | Putrajaya United FC | 9 | 3 | 0 | 6 | 19 | 27 | −8 | 9 | |
| 8 | Putracyber FC | 9 | 2 | 0 | 7 | 15 | 44 | −29 | 6 | |
| 9 | LP United FC | 9 | 2 | 0 | 7 | 7 | 62 | −55 | 6 | |
| 10 | Superfriends FC | 9 | 0 | 0 | 9 | 5 | 66 | −61 | 0 | |

Updated to match(es) played on 14 February 2026. Source: FA Putrajaya
Rules for classification: 1) Points; 2) Goal difference; 3) Number of goals scored.
(C) Champions

== Perlis Super League ==
Perlis Super League
- Season: 2025-26
- Champions: Juang Titan Kayang

| Pos | Team | Pld | W | D | L | GF | GA | GD | Pts |
|---|---|---|---|---|---|---|---|---|---|
| 1 | Juang Titan Kayang FC (C) | 5 | 4 | 0 | 1 | 11 | 2 | +9 | 12 |
| 2 | Bintong FC II | 5 | 3 | 1 | 1 | 11 | 6 | +5 | 10 |
| 3 | KSMR Kangar Unity - Singa Muda FC | 5 | 3 | 1 | 1 | 10 | 9 | +1 | 10 |
| 4 | Anak Nelayan Kuala Perlis FC | 5 | 2 | 1 | 2 | 16 | 6 | +10 | 7 |
| 5 | Stormz Padang Besar FC | 5 | 1 | 1 | 3 | 7 | 8 | −1 | 4 |
| 6 | Anas Sanglang FC | 5 | 0 | 0 | 5 | 4 | 24 | −20 | 0 |

Updated to match(es) played on 23 November 2025. Source: MSN PERLIS
Rules for classification: 1) Points; 2) Goal difference; 3) Number of goals scored.
(C) Champions

=== Fixtures and results ===
Match

=== Matchweek 1 ===
| 3 October 2025 | Bintong FC II | 4–0 | Ksmr Kangar Unity - Singa Muda FC | Kangar |
| 17:00 UTC+8 | | Report | | Stadium: Football Field 'A' TSP Sports Complex |

| 4 October 2025 | Anak Nelayan Kuala Perlis FC | 2–1 | Stormz Padang Besar FC | Kangar |
| 17:00 UTC+8 | | Report | | Stadium: Football Field 'A' TSP Sports Complex |

| 5 October 2025 | Anas Sanglang FC | 0–5 | Juang Titan Kayang FC | Kangar |
| 17:00 UTC+8 | | Report | | Stadium: Football Field 'A' TSP Sports Complex |

=== Matchweek 2 ===
| 11 October 2025 | Ksmr Kangar Unity - Singa Muda FC | 3–3 | Stormz Padang Besar FC | Kangar |
| 17:00 UTC+8 | | Report | | Stadium: Football Field 'A' TSP Sports Complex |

| 12 October 2025 | Anas Sanglang FC | 2–3 | Bintong FC II | Kangar |
| 17:00 UTC+8 | | Report | | Stadium: Football Field 'A' TSP Sports Complex |

| 26 October 2025 | Anak Nelayan Kuala Perlis FC | v | Juang Titan Kayang FC | Kangar |
| 16:50 UTC+8 | | | | Stadium: Football Field 'A' TSP Sports Complex |

=== Matchweek 3 ===
| 31 October 2025 | Juang Titan Kayang FC | v | Stormz Padang Besar FC | Kangar |
| 16:50 UTC+8 | | | | Stadium: Football Field 'A' TSP Sports Complex |

| 1 November 2025 | Anas Sanglang FC | v | Ksmr Kangar Unity - Singa Muda FC | Kangar |
| 16:50 UTC+8 | | | | Stadium: Football Field 'A' TSP Sports Complex |

| 2 November 2025 | Bintong FC II | v | Anak Nelayan Kuala Perlis FC | Kangar |
| 16:50 UTC+8 | | | | Stadium: Football Field 'A' TSP Sports Complex |

=== Matchweek 4 ===
| 14 November 2025 | Anas Sanglang FC | v | Anak Nelayan Kuala Perlis FC | Kangar |
| 16:50 UTC+8 | | | | Stadium: Football Field 'A' TSP Sports Complex |

| 15 November 2025 | Stormz Padang Besar FC | v | Bintong FC II | Kangar |
| 16:50 UTC+8 | | | | Stadium: Football Field 'A' TSP Sports Complex |

| 16 November 2025 | Juang Titan Kayang FC | v | Ksmr Kangar Unity - Singa Muda FC | Kangar |
| 16:50 UTC+8 | | | | Stadium: Football Field 'A' TSP Sports Complex |

=== Matchweek 5 ===
| 21 November 2025 | Stormz Padang Besar FC | v | Anas Sanglang FC | Kangar |
| 16:50 UTC+8 | | | | Stadium: Football Field 'A' TSP Sports Complex |

| 22 November 2025 | Ksmr Kangar Unity - Singa Muda FC | v | Anak Nelayan Kuala Perlis FC | Kangar |
| 16:50 UTC+8 | | | | Stadium: Football Field 'A' TSP Sports Complex |

| 23 November 2025 | Bintong FC II | v | Juang Titan Kayang FC | Kangar |
| 16:50 UTC+8 | | | | Stadium: Football Field 'A' TSP Sports Complex |

== Pahang Amateur League ==
Pahang Amateur League
- Season: 2025–26
- Champions: Gelora Old Boys

=== Group stage ===
==== West Zone ====
| Pos | Team | Pld | W | D | L | GF | GA | GD | Pts | Qualification or relegation |
|---|---|---|---|---|---|---|---|---|---|---|
| 1 | Twentyfour FC | 6 | 4 | 0 | 2 | 9 | 7 | +2 | 12 | Qualified to knockout stage |
| 2 | STW Jelai FC | 6 | 3 | 1 | 2 | 10 | 6 | +4 | 10 | Advance to qualification play-off |
| 3 | Seri Bukit FC | 6 | 2 | 1 | 3 | 9 | 13 | −4 | 7 | |
| 4 | Bentong City FC | 6 | 2 | 0 | 4 | 7 | 9 | −2 | 6 | |

Updated to match(es) played on 6 August 2025. Source: MY Liga Pahang
Rules for classification: 1) Points; 2) Goal difference; 3) Number of goals scored.

==== South Zone ====
| Pos | Team | Pld | W | D | L | GF | GA | GD | Pts | Qualification or relegation |
|---|---|---|---|---|---|---|---|---|---|---|
| 1 | FC Wagga Temerloh | 5 | 5 | 0 | 0 | 13 | 2 | +11 | 15 | Qualified to knockout stage |
| 2 | RFX United FC | 5 | 4 | 0 | 1 | 12 | 6 | +6 | 12 | Advance to qualification play-off |
| 3 | Darul Makmur United FC | 5 | 3 | 0 | 2 | 6 | 4 | +2 | 9 | Advance to qualification play-off |
| 4 | Temerloh Jaya Rovers FC | 5 | 2 | 0 | 3 | 7 | 8 | −1 | 6 | Advance to qualification play-off |
| 5 | Doesata United FC | 5 | 1 | 0 | 4 | 5 | 9 | −4 | 3 | |
| 6 | Sebertak FC | 5 | 0 | 0 | 5 | 6 | 20 | −14 | 0 | |

Updated to match(es) played on 6 August 2025. Source: MY Liga Pahang
Rules for classification: 1) Points; 2) Goal difference; 3) Number of goals scored.

==== Central Zone ====
| Pos | Team | Pld | W | D | L | GF | GA | GD | Pts | Qualification or relegation |
|---|---|---|---|---|---|---|---|---|---|---|
| 1 | Pasir Sia FC | 7 | 6 | 1 | 0 | 15 | 2 | +13 | 19 | Qualified to knockout stage |
| 2 | FC Jerantut | 7 | 5 | 1 | 1 | 19 | 7 | +12 | 16 | Advance to qualification play-off |
| 3 | Sri Tonkin FC | 7 | 4 | 1 | 2 | 20 | 7 | +13 | 13 | Advance to qualification play-off |
| 4 | Siantan FC | 7 | 4 | 1 | 2 | 15 | 10 | +5 | 13 | Advance to qualification play-off |
| 5 | Pulau Tawar FC | 7 | 3 | 2 | 2 | 14 | 10 | +4 | 11 | |
| 6 | Gelanggi FC | 7 | 2 | 0 | 5 | 9 | 19 | −10 | 6 | |
| 7 | Aby55 Jengka FC | 7 | 1 | 0 | 6 | 9 | 23 | −14 | 3 | |
| 8 | Heero Academy FC | 7 | 0 | 0 | 7 | 4 | 27 | −23 | 0 | |

Updated to match(es) played on 6 August 2025. Source: MY Liga Pahang
Rules for classification: 1) Points; 2) Goal difference; 3) Number of goals scored.

==== East Zone ====
| Pos | Team | Pld | W | D | L | GF | GA | GD | Pts | Qualification or relegation |
|---|---|---|---|---|---|---|---|---|---|---|
| 1 | MFT FC | 6 | 4 | 1 | 1 | 19 | 8 | +11 | 13 | Qualified to knockout stage |
| 2 | Gelora Old Boys FC (C) | 6 | 3 | 1 | 2 | 28 | 9 | +19 | 10 | Advance to qualification play-off |
| 3 | GCMA FC | 6 | 3 | 1 | 2 | 15 | 16 | −1 | 10 | |
| 4 | Real Kuantan FC | 6 | 0 | 1 | 5 | 6 | 35 | −29 | 1 | |

Updated to match(es) played on 6 August 2025. Source: MY Liga Pahang
Rules for classification: 1) Points; 2) Goal difference; 3) Number of goals scored.
(C) Champions

=== Qualification play-off ===
| Team 1 | Score | Team 2 |
|---|---|---|
| FC Jerantut | 2–0 | Temerloh Jaya Rovers FC |
| STW Jelai FC | 3–0 | Darul Makmur United FC |
| Gelora Old Boys FC | 3–1 | Siantan FC |
| RFX United FC | 2–0 | Sri Tonkin FC |

==== Matches ====
| 9 August 2025 | FC Jerantut | 2–0 | Temerloh Jaya Rovers FC | Kompleks Sukan KBS, Jerantut |
| 16:45 UTC+8 | | Report |

| 9 August 2025 | STW Jelai FC | 3–0 | Darul Makmur United FC | Dataran Tras, Bentong |
| 16:45 UTC+8 | | Report |

| 9 August 2025 | Gelora Old Boys FC | 3–1 | Siantan FC | Padang MPK 10, Kuantan |
| 16:45 UTC+8 | | Report |

| 9 August 2025 | RFX United FC | 2–0 | Sri Tonkin FC | Padang Tanjung Batu, Temerloh |
| 16:45 UTC+8 | | Report |

=== Knockout stage (PAL) ===
Quarterfinals
Twentyfour FC | 2
FC Jerantut | 1
FC Wagga Temerloh | 0
Gelora Old Boys FC | 2
Pasir Sia FC | 1 (4)
STW Jelai FC | 1 (3)
MFT FC | 1
RFX United FC | 2

Semifinals
Twentyfour FC | 0
Gelora Old Boys FC | 1
Pasir Sia FC | 0
RFX United FC | 2

Final
Gelora Old Boys FC | 1 (3)
RFX United FC | 1 (1)

=== Quarter-final ===
| 17 August 2025 | Twentyfour FC | 2–1 | FC Jerantut | Temerloh |
| 15:30 UTC+8 | | Report | | Stadium: Temerloh Mini Stadium |

| 17 August 2025 | FC Wagga Temerloh | 0–2 | Gelora Old Boys FC | Temerloh |
| 17:30 UTC+8 | | Report | | Stadium: Temerloh Mini Stadium |

| 17 August 2025 | Pasir Sia FC | 1–1 (4–3 p) | STW Jelai FC | Temerloh |
| 20:00 UTC+8 | | Report | | Stadium: Temerloh Mini Stadium |

| 17 August 2025 | MFT FC | 1–2 | RFX United FC | Temerloh |
| 21:45 UTC+8 | | Report | | Stadium: Temerloh Mini Stadium |

=== Semi-final ===
| 24 August 2025 | Twentyfour FC | 0–1 | Gelora Old Boys FC | Temerloh |
| 15:30 UTC+8 | | Report | | Stadium: Temerloh Mini Stadium |

| 24 August 2025 | Pasir Sia FC | 0–2 | RFX United FC | Temerloh |
| 17:15 UTC+8 | | Report | | Stadium: Temerloh Mini Stadium |

=== Final ===
31 August 2025
20:15 UTC+8

| Gelora Old Boys FC | 1–1 (a.e.t.) | RFX United FC |
|---|---|---|
| Fitri Aziq 40' | Report | Sathis Nair 67' (pen.) |
Penalties
| Fitri Aziq (penalty scored); Hazril (penalty scored); Kamarul (penalty missed); Amirul (penalty scored) | 3–1 | (penalty missed) Farid; (penalty scored) Lingeshwaran; (penalty missed) Sathis Nair; (penalty missed) Ahmad Fitri |

Temerloh Mini Stadium, Temerloh

== A Ligue Champions League ==
A Ligue Champions League
- Season: 2025–26
- Champions: Obi & Friends FC

=== Group stage ===
==== Bangi Zone ====
| Pos | Team | Pld | W | D | L | GF | GA | GD | Pts | Promotion, qualification or relegation |
|---|---|---|---|---|---|---|---|---|---|---|
| 1 | Alti Genius FC | 8 | 5 | 3 | 0 | 24 | 9 | +15 | 18 | Qualified to knockout stage |
| 2 | Puncak Alam United FC | 8 | 5 | 2 | 1 | 23 | 8 | +15 | 17 | Qualified to knockout stage |
| 3 | Klang Valley Comrade FC | 8 | 4 | 3 | 1 | 12 | 8 | +4 | 15 | Qualified to knockout stage |
| 4 | Masjid Bandar Tun Hussein Onn FC | 8 | 4 | 2 | 2 | 21 | 14 | +7 | 14 | Qualified to knockout stage |
| 5 | Gemilang FC | 8 | 4 | 2 | 2 | 19 | 16 | +3 | 14 | Advance to Qualification play-off |
| 6 | Loyal Troopers FC | 8 | 2 | 3 | 3 | 13 | 16 | −3 | 9 | Advance to Qualification play-off |
| 7 | Nadi Sepang FC | 8 | 2 | 1 | 5 | 9 | 17 | −8 | 7 | Advance to Qualification play-off |
| 8 | Arslan FC | 8 | 2 | 0 | 6 | 17 | 18 | −1 | 6 | |
| 9 | Perakan Nilai FC | 8 | 0 | 0 | 8 | 7 | 39 | −32 | 0 | |

Updated to match(es) played on 26 August 2025. Source: A-Ligue
Rules for classification: 1) Points; 2) Goal difference; 3) Number of goals scored.

==== Kuala Lumpur Zone ====
| Pos | Team | Pld | W | D | L | GF | GA | GD | Pts | Promotion, qualification or relegation |
|---|---|---|---|---|---|---|---|---|---|---|
| 1 | Obi & Friends FC (C) | 9 | 8 | 0 | 1 | 44 | 10 | +34 | 24 | Qualified to knockout stage |
| 2 | HE Clinic FC | 9 | 8 | 0 | 1 | 37 | 5 | +32 | 24 | Qualified to knockout stage |
| 3 | OSV UK FC | 9 | 6 | 1 | 2 | 27 | 11 | +16 | 19 | Qualified to knockout stage |
| 4 | Asawa FC | 9 | 5 | 0 | 4 | 22 | 18 | +4 | 15 | Qualified to knockout stage |
| 5 | Damansara Bulls FC | 9 | 4 | 1 | 4 | 24 | 12 | +12 | 13 | Advance to Qualification play-off |
| 6 | Sri Ampang Bootboys Club FC | 9 | 4 | 1 | 4 | 14 | 12 | +2 | 13 | Advance to Qualification play-off |
| 7 | Catalans Empire FC | 9 | 4 | 0 | 5 | 16 | 19 | −3 | 12 | Advance to Qualification play-off |
| 8 | Rantau KL FC | 9 | 3 | 1 | 5 | 15 | 23 | −8 | 10 | |
| 9 | Young Falcons FC | 9 | 1 | 0 | 8 | 3 | 49 | −46 | 3 | |
| 10 | Bawean City FC | 9 | 0 | 0 | 9 | 6 | 49 | −43 | 0 | |

Updated to match(es) played on 19 August 2025. Source: A-Ligue
Rules for classification: 1) Points; 2) Goal difference; 3) Number of goals scored.
(C) Champions

==== Subang Zone ====
| Pos | Team | Pld | W | D | L | GF | GA | GD | Pts | Promotion, qualification or relegation |
|---|---|---|---|---|---|---|---|---|---|---|
| 1 | Neo X FC | 10 | 7 | 1 | 2 | 33 | 14 | +19 | 22 | Qualified to knockout stage |
| 2 | Carabat FC | 10 | 5 | 3 | 2 | 34 | 17 | +17 | 18 | Qualified to knockout stage |
| 3 | Budak Baru Nak Up FC | 10 | 5 | 3 | 2 | 31 | 16 | +15 | 18 | Qualified to knockout stage |
| 4 | Shah Alam Antlers FC | 10 | 4 | 3 | 3 | 28 | 18 | +10 | 15 | Qualified to knockout stage |
| 5 | Kuala Lumpur Passion FC | 10 | 3 | 2 | 5 | 19 | 22 | −3 | 11 | Advance to Qualification play-off |
| 6 | Scarecrow FC | 10 | 0 | 0 | 10 | 2 | 60 | −58 | 0 | Advance to Qualification play-off |

Updated to match(es) played on 26 August 2025. Source: A-Ligue
Rules for classification: 1) Points; 2) Goal difference; 3) Number of goals scored.

=== Qualification play-off (ALC) ===
| Team 1 | Score | Team 2 |
|---|---|---|
| Damansara Bulls FC | 3–1 | Scarecrow FC |
| Sri Ampang Bootboys Club FC | 0–1 | Loyal Troopers FC |
| Catalans Empire FC | 2–0 | Gemilang FC |
| Kuala Lumpur Passion FC | 0–3 | Nadi Sepang FC |

=== Knockout stage (ALC) ===
Round16
Obi & Friends FC | 3 | 2 | 5
Loyal Troopers FC | 2 | 2 | 4
Klang Valley Comrade FC | 1 | 1 | 2
Budak Baru Nak Up FC | 0 | 1 | 1
Alti Genius FC | 3 | 1 | 4
Nadi Sepang FC | 1 | 1 | 2
OSV UK FC | 1 | 2 | 3
Masjid Bandar Tun Hussein Onn FC | 0 | 0 | 0
Neo X FC | 5 | 3 | 8
Catalans Empire FC | 0 | 1 | 1
Puncak Alam United FC | 4 | 2 | 6
Shah Alam Antlers FC | 2 | 1 | 3
He Clinic FC | 1 | 2 | 3
Damansara Bulls FC | 0 | 1 | 1
Carabat FC | 6 | 5 | 11
Asawa FC | 1 | 2 | 3

Quarterfinals
Obi & Friends FC | 3 | 0 | 3
Klang Valley Comrade FC | 1 | 1 | 2
Alti Genius FC | 1 | 0 | 1 (3)
OSV UK FC | 1 | 0 | 1 (2)
Neo X FC | 2 | 5 | 7
Puncak Alam United FC | 0 | 1 | 1
He Clinic FC | 1 | 0 | 1
Carabat FC | 1 | 2 | 3

Semifinal
Obi & Friends FC | 2 | 4 | 6
Alti Genius FC | 0 | 2 | 2
Neo X FC | 2 | 3 | 5
Carabat FC | 3 | 1 | 4

Final
Obi & Friends FC | 2
Neo X FC | 1
Third place play-off
Alti Genius FC | 0
Carabat FC | 1

== See also ==
- 2025–26 Malaysia A1 Semi-Pro League
- 2025–26 Malaysia A2 Amateur League
