= 2026–27 Malaysia A3 Community League =

Malaysia A3 Community League
- Season: 2026–27
- Dates: June 2026 – May 2027

The 2026–27 Malaysia A3 Community League (Malay: Liga Komuniti A3 Malaysia) is the fifth season of the Malaysia A3 Community League, the 4th of 9 football leagues in the Malaysian football league system. Each state, district, or city runs its own A3 Community League under the supervision of the Amateur Football League (AFL). The leagues run independently in their zones, but follow a unified guideline for promotion eligibility to the Malaysia A2 Amateur League.

== Team changes ==
The following teams have changed division since the 2025–26 season.

▲ Promoted to A2 League	▼ Relegated from A2 League
(Pahang) STW Jelai; (Negeri Sembilan) Seremban United; (Negeri Sembilan) MP Port Dickson	(Kedah) Kubang Pasu-MPKB; (Kedah) Kuala Muda; Kuala Lumpur Rangers; Kuala Lumpur Rovers; (Malacca) MBMB Warriors; (Malacca) Duyong Fighters; (Pahang) Kuantan City; (Perlis) Bintong; (Selangor) UiTM United

Notes

1. Seremban United (SER): merged with PUSEN Hornet become PUSEN-Seremban United.
2. STW Jelai (STW): merged with Raub become Raub-STW.

== Putrajaya A3 Community League ==
Putrajaya A3 Community League
- Season: 2026–27

Pos	Team	Pld	W	D	L	GF	GA	GD	Pts	Promotion, qualification or relegation
1	ATM Junior	4	3	1	0	17	5	+12	10	Promotion to A2 Amateur League
2	Puncak Alam United	4	3	1	0	12	3	+9	10	
3	Tentera Darat	4	3	1	0	10	3	+7	10	
4	Red White	4	2	1	1	6	6	0	7	
5	Arslan	4	2	0	2	9	9	0	6	
6	Alti Genius	4	1	1	2	5	4	+1	4	
7	Red Jacket Z.5	4	1	1	2	5	12	−7	4	
8	Krisputra PPJ	4	1	0	3	6	12	−6	3	
9	Donz X Vilia	4	0	1	3	4	11	−7	1	
10	Putrajaya U-23	4	0	1	3	4	13	−9	1	

Updated to match(es) played on 14 November 2026. Source: FA Putrajaya
Rules for classification: 1) Points; 2) Goal difference; 3) Number of goals scored.

== Jerantut Super League ==
Jerantut Super League
- Season: 2026–27

=== Group stage ===
==== Group A ====
Pos	Team	Pld	W	D	L	GF	GA	GD	Pts	Qualification or relegation
1	Gelanggi FC	3	2	1	0	9	3	+6	7	Qualified to knockout stage
2	Cancai River	3	2	1	0	7	3	+4	7	Qualified to knockout stage
3	Aby55 PBMP	3	2	0	1	9	8	+1	6	Qualified to knockout stage
4	Kast D FC	3	1	2	0	3	1	+2	5	Qualified to knockout stage
5	Paip FC	3	1	0	2	6	5	+1	3	
6	Arif FC	2	0	2	0	3	3	0	2	
7	Berumba FC	2	0	0	2	1	4	−3	0	
8	Heero Academy	3	0	0	3	4	15	−11	0	

Updated to match(es) played on 21 November 2026. Source: Jerantut FA
Rules for classification: 1) Points; 2) Goal difference; 3) Number of goals scored.

==== Group B ====
Pos	Team	Pld	W	D	L	GF	GA	GD	Pts	Qualification or relegation
1	Tembeling United	3	3	0	0	12	0	+12	9	Qualified to knockout stage
2	Paip Jerantut Rovers	3	1	1	1	6	6	0	4	Qualified to knockout stage
3	Ferry FC	1	1	0	0	2	1	+1	3	Qualified to knockout stage
4	Doesata United	2	0	2	0	3	3	0	2	Qualified to knockout stage
5	Semantan Fighter	2	0	1	1	4	9	−5	1	
6	Lepar Utara FC	1	0	0	1	0	2	−2	0	
7	Jenderus FC	2	0	0	2	1	7	−6	0	

Updated to match(es) played on 21 November 2026. Source: Jerantut FA
Rules for classification: 1) Points; 2) Goal difference; 3) Number of goals scored.
