= Malaysian Football League =

- Industry: Sports
- Founded: 3 February 2015; 11 years ago Kuala Lumpur, Malaysia
- Headquarters: Putrajaya, Malaysia
- Key people: Dato’ Ab Ghani Hassan
- Website: www.malaysianfootballleague.com

The Malaysian Football League, also known simply as the MFL, was created during the course of the privatisation of the Malaysian football league system. It was formerly known as Football Malaysia Limited Liability Partnership (FMLLP). The company operates and runs all entities in Malaysian football under its jurisdiction, which include Liga Super, A1 League, A2 League, A3 League, MFL Cup (formerly), Malaysia Cup, Malaysia Challenge Cup, Malaysia FA Cup, Piala Sumbangsih, Piala Emas Raja-Raja, Malaysia Premier Futsal League and Malaysia Futsal Cup. It aims to transform and move Malaysian football forward.

The Malaysian Football League organises and keeps the official records of domestic matches, oversees the development, certification and registration of players and staff, promotes through broadcasts and other media outlets.

== History ==
After the appointment of MP & Silva by the Football Association of Malaysia (FAM) as its Global Advisor for all media and commercial rights for an extensive lineup of FAM competitions, the Football Malaysia Limited Liability Partnership (FMLLP) was established to manage the top two tiers of Malaysian football league competition while the MP & Silva and FAM partnership's goal was to extend its broadcast reach and maximising the commercial potential of its properties. The partnership signified the first steps of the privatisation of the Malaysian professional leagues as their subsidiary holding company, the Football Malaysia Limited Liability Partnership (FMLLP), was established for the day-to-day administration of local club football at a league-wide level.

This deal was worth RM 1.26 billion over a 15-year period, commencing from 2016. However, cracks in the agreement appeared later that year, with MP & Silva only offering a level of investment lower than FAM had originally turned down.

In March 2018, the company was rebranded as the Malaysian Football League from Football Malaysia Limited Liability Partnership. The company aimed to be more dynamic and competitive, with the MFL now an independent organization and was no longer tied to FAM.

In 2018, a new subsidiary of the company was formed known as Amateur Football League (AFL) which was tasked to manage the third division and below from 2019 onward. The AFL officially confirmed the formation of the Malaysia M3 League and the Malaysia M4 League as the third and fourth division of the Malaysian football league system as amateur league competitions. A total of 14 clubs were confirmed to compete in the inaugural season of the newly reformed third division, which replaced the former Malaysia FAM Cup while the Malaysia M4 League had state FA leagues and social leagues run in parallel to form the new fourth division.

== Corporate structure ==
Malaysian Football League structure consists of the following:

- League Congress has 29 seats: One seat from each of the participating Malaysia Super League teams and others from FAM.
- League Executive Committee has three seats, filled by members of the Congress voted into the board for a particular term.

Position	Name
President	(Malaysia) Dato’ Ab Ghani Hassan
CEO	(Spain) Giorgio Pompili Rossi

== Current title holders ==
Competition	Season	Champions	Title	Runners-up	Next season
Charity Shield competition
Piala Sumbangsih	2026	Johor Darul Ta'zim	11th	Kuching City	2027
League competition
Malaysia Super League	2025–26	Johor Darul Ta'zim	12th	Kuching City	2026–27
Malaysia A1 Semi-Pro League	2025–26	Johor Darul Ta'zim II	1st	Selangor II	2026–27
Malaysia A2 Amateur League	2025–26	AZM Rovers	1st	USM	2026–27
Malaysia A3 Community League	2025–26	Various			2026–27
Cup competition
Malaysia FA Cup	2025	Johor Darul Ta'zim	5th	Sabah	2026–27
Malaysia Cup	2026	Johor Darul Ta'zim	6th	Kuching City	2027
MFL Challenge Cup	2026	Sabah	1st	Penang	2027
Youth competition
MFL Cup	2024–25	Johor Darul Ta'zim II	1st	Selangor II	Not held
Piala Presiden	2026	Johor Darul Ta'zim III	6th	TBD	2027
Piala Belia	2026	Johor Darul Ta'zim IV	3rd	AMD A	2027

== See also ==
- Malaysian League
