= NS Forces Warriors F.C. =

Malaysian football club

NS Forces Warriors
- Full name: Negeri Sembilan Forces Warriors Football Club
- Nicknames: The Forces; The Warriors; The N9
- Short name: NSFW
- Founded: 2023; 3 years ago, as 24 Warriors FC
- Ground: Seriemas SportsPlex
- Capacity: 500
- Head coach: Mohamad Hafizal bin Abu Hassan
- League: Malaysia A2 Amateur League
- 2025–26: Group stage
Home colours	Away colours

Negeri Sembilan Forces Warriors Football Club (commonly known as NS Forces Warriors, N9 Forces, formerly 24 Warriors FC) is a Malaysian football club based in Nilai, Negeri Sembilan. It competes in the third-tier Malaysia A2 Amateur League, with its reserve team playing in the state-level Negeri Sembilan Premier League.

== History ==
=== Founding and promotion (2023–2025) ===
Founded in 2023 as 24 Warriors FC, the club started in the fourth-tier Negeri Sembilan A3 Community Super League. After finishing as runners-up in the 2024–25 campaign, the club earned promotion to the national amateur tier.

=== Rebranding and national debut (2025–present) ===
For the 2025–26 Malaysia A2 Amateur League, the club rebranded as NS Forces Warriors FC to align with the regional football community. Assigned to the South Zone (Zon Selatan) alongside clubs like PUSEN Hornet FC and MBMB Warriors FC, the club stepped into national competition.

Simultaneously, a reserve squad (NS Forces Warriors II) competed in the revamped 2025–26 Negeri Sembilan Premier League, finishing fourth in Group A to reach the state knock-out rounds. The club continued its campaign into the 2026–27 Malaysia A2 Amateur League season.

== Stadium ==
- Malaysia A2 Amateur League: Seriemas SportsPlex, Kota Seriemas, Nilai (~500 capacity)
- Negeri Sembilan Premier League: PBNS BubblesO2 Arena, Seremban

== Players ==
=== Current squad ===
As of November 2026

Note: Flags indicate national team as defined under FIFA eligibility rules; some limited exceptions apply. Players may hold more than one non-FIFA nationality.

No.	Pos.	Nation	Player
1	GK	MAS	Cik Syafiq Cik Kasiki
2	DF	MAS	Azmanizam Muhammad
3	DF	MAS	Aqif Nor Azlan (captain)
4	DF	MAS	Mahadi Jabrullah
5	MF	MAS	Zahir Rosly
6	DF	MAS	Izwan Mohd Yusuf
7	DF	MAS	Nor Irwan Abd Rahman
8	FW	MAS	Iskandar Dzulkarnain
9	GK	MAS	Mohamad Iqbal Zainol
10	MF	MAS	Taufik Samsuddin
11	FW	MAS	Naqib Naqiuddin Afifi Asmawi^{U22}
12	MF	MAS	Nur Shahrul Akhmal
13	DF	MAS	Mohd Syafiq Azman
14	MF	MAS	Hilmi Mohd Saffiee
15	DF	MAS	Zulhamizam Maajid

No.	Pos.	Nation	Player
17	DF	MAS	Noraiman Talib
19	MF	MAS	Amirul Haqim Yusri
22	GK	MAS	Khairul Azwa Ismail
24	MF	MAS	Mohamad Termizi Zulkafli
33	DF	MAS	Awang Zairullah Awang Zainuddin
41	MF	MAS	Iman Zaim Muhammad Nor
44	MF	MAS	Raja Amar Naqqiuddin
55	FW	MAS	Aidil Firdaus Jamari
66	MF	MAS	Adam Rifqi Mahfuz
77	MF	MAS	Syah Adam Sahabudin^{U22}
80	FW	MAS	Ahmad Solihin Abdul Rahma
85	MF	MAS	Saiful Yusman Mohamad Noor
88	MF	MAS	Muhammad Hafiz Hamid
90	GK	MAS	Farzly Muhammad
99	MF	MAS	Aufa Syahir Sabarudin

== Management ==
As of November 2026

Position	Name
Team manager	(Malaysia) Mohd Yunus bin Hassan
Assistant manager	(Malaysia) Abdul Haziq bin Hamzah
Head coach	(Malaysia) Mohamad Hafizal bin Abu Hassan
Team official	(Malaysia) Farhan Mansor
Team admin	(Malaysia) Tuan Mohd Ikhwan Tuan Abdul Rahman (Malaysia) Faqih Ikhwan bin Mohd Fauzi

== Season-by-season record ==
Season	League									FA Cup	M Cup	C Cup	Top goalscorer (all competitions)	
Season	Division	P	W	D	L	F	A	Pts	Pos	FA Cup	M Cup	C Cup	Name	Goals
2024–25	A3 Community League	9	6	1	2	22	15	19	2nd	Opted out	DNQ	DNQ	unknown	—N/a
2025–26	A2 Amateur League	8	0	0	8	2	26	0	5th	Opted out	DNQ	DNQ	(Malaysia) Ahmad Syafiq (Malaysia) Aidil Firdaus	1
2026–27	A2 Amateur League	0	0	0	0	0	0	0	TBD	Opted out	DNQ	DNQ	TBD	TBD

== Honours ==
=== Domestic ===
League

- Negeri Sembilan A3 Community Super League
  - Runners-up (1): 2024–25

== See also ==
- Football in Malaysia
- National Special Operations Force (Malaysia)
