= Teck Hin F.C. =

Malaysian football club

Teck Hin-KR
- Full name: Teck Hin-KR Football Club
- Short name: TH-KR FC
- Founded: 2006; 20 years ago
- Ground: UiTM Seremban
- Capacity: 500
- Head coach: Roslan Bin Othman @ Tasrip
- League: Malaysia A2 Amateur League; Malaysia A3 Community League (reserves)
- Website: www.teckhin-kr.com
Home colours	Away colours	Third colours

Teck Hin-KR Football Club (commonly known as Teck Hin FC or Teck Hin-KR) is a Malaysian football club based in Seremban, Negeri Sembilan. The club currently competes in the Malaysia A2 Amateur League, the third tier of the Malaysian football league system, and reserves compete in the Malaysia A3 Community League.

== History ==
The club was originally founded in 2006 as Teck Hin FC and has been a long-time participant in the local football scene across Seremban and Negeri Sembilan. The club played in the Seremban Football A3 Community League during the 2024–25 season, finishing as runners-up and promoted to the 2025–26 Malaysia A2 Amateur League.

The club underwent a rebranding process and merged with another local team, KR FC. Following the merger, the club officially registered and competed under the name Teck Hin-KR F.C. The organization also established a developmental squad, Teck Hin-KR FC II, to compete in the 2025–26 Negeri Sembilan Premier League.

== Crest ==
2006–2025

2026–now

== Players ==
=== Current squad ===
As of September 2025

Note: Flags indicate national team as defined under FIFA eligibility rules; some limited exceptions apply. Players may hold more than one non-FIFA nationality.

No.	Pos.	Nation	Player
1	GK	MAS	Arif Haikal Adnan
2	DF	MAS	Amir Shaifulniza
4	DF	MAS	Faqrul Najmi Fadil
5	DF	MAS	Arif Ismail
6	MF	MAS	Raihan Huzaizi
8	MF	MAS	Hairil Irwan
9	FW	MAS	Syafiq Mohd Zahari
10	MF	MAS	Karlish Mohd Amin
11	MF	MAS	Ranggi Oftawan
12	GK	MAS	Kaharuddin Abdul Rahman
13	FW	MAS	Alifh Aiman
14	DF	MAS	Arif Danial
17	MF	MAS	Alif Irfan
18	GK	MAS	Izzat Hakimi (captain)
19	DF	MAS	Aqeem Nur Ilham

No.	Pos.	Nation	Player
20	DF	MAS	Hafizuddin Mohd Zani
21	MF	MAS	Zulhairy Hashim
22	DF	MAS	Meer Adam Shah
23	FW	MAS	Nurzaidi Bunari
24	MF	MAS	Kartheesan A/L Sivakumar
27	DF	MAS	Lokman Hakim
28	MF	MAS	Amirul Farhan
29	FW	MAS	Hafiz Izzat Hasnan
30	MF	MAS	Fakrul Aiman
33	MF	MAS	Amir Firdaus
44	DF	MAS	Khairul Faizzuhri
46	MF	MAS	Badrul Amin Hamid
77	FW	MAS	Abdul Mubin Ab Wahab
88	MF	MAS	Azamuddin Ab Rasid

== Management ==
As of September 2025

Position	Name
Team manager	(Malaysia) Khalid Bin A. Rashid
Head coach	(Malaysia) Roslan Bin Othman @ Tasrip
Assistant coach	(Malaysia) Ahmad Faizal Bin Sumar (Malaysia) Mohd Farid Bin Ahmad
Goalkeeper coach	(Malaysia) Mohamad Khairi Bin Hassan
Fitness coach	(Malaysia) Muhamad Nasrin Eman Bin Mazlan
Physio	(Malaysia) Putra Asyran Naim Bin Khaizal Ozlen
Kitman	(Malaysia) Mohammad Mu’az Bin Mohamed Amin (Malaysia) Muhammad Zulhelmy Bin Zulkafly

== Honours ==
=== Domestic ===
==== Amateur leagues ====
- Division 3/Malaysia A2 Amateur League
  - Southern Zone Champions: 2025–26
- Division 4/Negeri Sembilan Premier League
  - Champions (1): 2025–26
- Division 4/Seremban A3 Community League
  - Runners-up (1): 2024–25

== See also ==
- Football in Malaysia
