= Football Association of Pahang =

Malaysian football association

Football Association of Pahang Persatuan Bola Sepak Negeri Pahang (PBNP)
- Founded: 1959; 67 years ago
- Purpose: Football association
- Headquarters: No 824, Tingkat 1, Jln Bukit Ubi, 25200
- Location: Kuantan, Malaysia
- President: YAM Tengku Abdul Rahman Al-Haj Ibni Almarhum Sultan Haji Ahmad Shah Al-Mustain Billah

Football Association of Pahang (FAP) (Malay: Persatuan Bolasepak Pahang (PBNP) is the governing body of football for the state of Pahang, Malaysia. PBNP is responsible for coordinating and developing regional football, and has teamed up with the Football Association of Malaysia (FAM) as the official governing body of football in Malaysia.

== History ==
=== Origins ===
Pahang Football Association or known as Pahang FA was established by Sultan Abu Bakar Mu'azzam Shah ibni al-Marhum Sultan Abdullah in 1959 to represent the state of Pahang in the HMS Beagle Cup. The following year, the association began preparations to compete against other states before taking part for the first time in the HMS Beagle Cup. The construction of their current official stadium, the Darul Makmur Stadium, was completed by the Kuantan Municipal Council in 1970.

== Association management ==
Positions	Name
President	(Malaysia) Tengku Abdul Rahman Ibni Sultan Haji Ahmad Shah
Deputy president	(Malaysia) Datuk Seri Muhammad Safian Ismail
Vice president	(Malaysia) Datuk Tajuddin Abdullah
Vice president	(Malaysia) Datuk Jalaluddin Mohd Deli
Vice president	(Malaysia) Datuk Akbar Abu
Vice president	(Malaysia) Omar Othman
Vice president	(Malaysia) Fuzzemi Ibrahim
General secretary	(Malaysia) Puan Norlia Binti Abdul Manaf
Executive committee members	(Malaysia) Datuk Abdul Rahman Daud
Executive committee members	(Malaysia) Datuk Mustafa Mohd Yasin
Executive committee members	(Malaysia) Raja Mustafa Shah Raja Jalil
Executive committee members	(Malaysia) Abd Razab Wahab
Executive committee members	(Malaysia) Adzlan Zakaria
Executive committee members	(Malaysia) Husziabidi Husin
Executive committee members	(Malaysia) Rosli Nordin
Executive committee members	(Malaysia) Roslan Abdullah
Executive committee members	(Malaysia) S. Krishnan
Executive committee members	(Malaysia) Wan Solihi Wan Hassan

== Competitions ==
The Pahang Football Association organises the Pahang Amateur League, Junior League, MLP Super Cup and Piala Remaja for its regional level clubs.

== Affiliations ==
Clubs in the top league competitions affiliated to the Pahang Football Association include:

- YPM FC, A2 Amateur League
- Raub, A2 Amateur League
- Kuantan City, A2 Amateur League
- Semantan Troopers, A3 Community League
- Pahang Rangers, MPFL Division 1
- Sri Pahang, defunct
- Shahzan Muda, defunct

== District football associations ==
There are 11 Football association affiliated to the PBNP.

- Pahang Malay's
- (Pahang) Kuantan
- (Pahang) Jerantut
- (Pahang) Pekan
- (Pahang) Rompin
- (Pahang) Temerloh
- (Pahang) Bentong
- (Pahang) Raub
- (Pahang) Lipis
- (Pahang) Cameron Highlands
- (Pahang) Bera

== See also ==
- Piala Presiden
- Piala Belia
- History of Malaysian football
