= Football Association of Perlis =

Malaysian football association

Perlis Football Association Persatuan Bola Sepak Perlis
- Founded: 1963; 63 years ago
- Purpose: Football association
- Headquarters: No 33, Jalan Sena Indah, Persiaran Jubli Emas
- Location: Kangar, Perlis, Malaysia
- President: Encik Zamri bin Ibrahim

Perlis Football Association (PFA) (Malay: Persatuan Bola Sepak Perlis) is the governing body of football for the state of Perlis, Malaysia. PFA is responsible for coordinating and developing regional football with the Football Association of Malaysia (FAM) as the official governing body of football in Malaysia.

== History ==
Founded in 1963, the team had a long-standing rivalry with Kedah FA, collectively known as the "Northern derby". Perlis FA home is the 20,000-seat Tuanku Syed Putra Stadium, built in 1995 to replace the Dato' Sheikh Ahmad Stadium. Perlis had their first major success in the 2004 season, when they won the Malaysia Cup. They went on to win the Malaysia Super League, in 2005, and another Malaysia Cup in 2006. They played three finals of the Malaysia FA Cup (2003, 2006, 2007). The team had also won the Malaysian Charity Shield/Piala Sumbangsih twice (2007, 2008). As for continental tournaments, 2006 was their debut playing in the AFC Cup. They did qualify for the 2010 edition of the AFC Cup, but withdrew from the competition.

== Suspension ==
The team served a two-year FIFA suspension for failing to settle salary arrears of players and coaches in 2019. With some Perlis-based clubs continued participation in the domestic competitions, it could be interpreted as a suspension on PFA as a team.

FAM has also made the suspension announcement due to the PFA's failure to settle the outstanding wages to their former football director Matt Holland. The FAM decision about mandatory privatization of the state teams in 2021 contributed to Perlis FA not continuing their senior activities.

== Association management ==
| Position | Name |
|---|---|
| President | (Malaysia) Zamri bin Ibrahim |
| Deputy president | (Malaysia) Noor Amin bin Ahmad |
| Vice presidents | (Malaysia) Dr. Abdul Ghafur bin Hanafi |
| Vice presidents | (Malaysia) Mohd Khomeini bin Halipah |
| Vice presidents | (Malaysia) A. Puspanathan a/l Ayam Perima |
| General secretary | (Malaysia) Naimulddin bin Haron |
| Executive committee members | (Malaysia) Mohd Norhanizam Hamzah |
| Executive committee members | (Malaysia) Mohd. Zulhadi bin Yusof |
| Executive committee members | (Malaysia) Ku Hasnol Farid Ku Abd Rahman |
| Executive committee members | (Malaysia) Dr. Ahmad Fadhzil bin Mohamad |
| Executive committee members | (Malaysia) Syed Atif bin Syed Abu Bakar |
| Executive committee members | (Malaysia) Helmy Irwan bin Md Jusoh |
| Executive committee members | (Malaysia) Zulfikar Amizan bin Ahamed |
| Executive committee members | (Malaysia) Mohd. Nashriq bin Othaman |
| Executive committee members | (Malaysia) Sabri bin Ismail |
| Executive committee members | (Malaysia) Nur Fatin Shairah binti Suhaimi |

== Former presidents ==
| Name | Period |
|---|---|
| (Malaysia) Shahidan Kassim | 1998–2013 |
| (Malaysia) Rozabil Abdul Rahman | 2013–2017 |
| (Malaysia) Shaharuddin Ismail | 2017–2018 |
| (Malaysia) Amizal Shaifit Ahmad Rafie | 2018–2019 |
| (Malaysia) Zainuddin Osman | 2019–2020 |
| (Malaysia) Encik Zamri bin Ibrahim | 2021–present |

== Competitions ==
The Perlis Football Association organises the Perlis Super League for its regional level clubs.

== Notable members ==
Clubs in the league competitions affiliated to the Perlis Football Association include:

- Kuala Perlis Titans (Malaysia A2 Amateur League)
- Perlis GSA (Malaysia A3 Community League)
- Bintong (Malaysia A3 Community League)
- Singa Muda Perlis (Piala Belia)
- Perlis United (defunct)
- Perlis FA (defunct)

== See also ==
- Piala Presiden
- History of Malaysian football
