= Kuala Perlis Titans F.C. =

Malaysian football club

Kuala Perlis Titans
- Full name: Kuala Perlis Titans Football Club
- Nickname: The Titans
- Short name: KPT
- Founded: 2018; 8 years ago
- Ground: UniMAP Stadium, Pauh
- Capacity: 500
- Head coach: Mohd Annif bin Mat Aman
- League: Malaysia A2 Amateur League
- 2025–26: Semi-finals
- Website: www.kuala-perlis-titans.com
Home colours	Away colours

Kuala Perlis Titans Football Club, (Malay: Kelab Bolasepak Kuala Perlis Titans) or simply Kuala Perlis Titans, is a Malaysian football club based in Kuala Perlis, Perlis. The club currently plays in the Malaysia A2 Amateur League, the third tier of the Malaysian football league system.

== History ==
Kuala Perlis Titans first gained prominence in the Liga Super Perlis, a state-level amateur competition organised by the Perlis State Sports Council (Majlis Sukan Negeri Perlis), the Perlis State Government and the Amateur Football League (AFL). The team became one of the strongest contenders in the competition, recording unbeaten run in the 2024 season.

In the 2024 Liga Super Perlis, the Titans finished as runners-up, earned promotion to the 2025–26 Malaysia A2 Amateur League, marking its debut at a higher national amateur level.

== Stadium ==
The team played most of its home matches at Tuanku Syed Putra Stadium in Kangar, which has a seating capacity of approximately 20,000. However, in the Malaysia A2 Amateur League they play at UniMAP Stadium, Pauh.

== Colours and crest ==
The Titans’ traditional colours are blue and yellow, often reflected in their home kits, while away kit uses white and blue trim.

== Players ==
=== Current squad ===
As of November 2026

Note: Flags indicate national team as defined under FIFA eligibility rules; some limited exceptions apply. Players may hold more than one non-FIFA nationality.

No.	Pos.	Nation	Player
1	GK	MAS	Nabil Adzib
4	DF	MAS	Arif Muharram
5	DF	MAS	Ridzwan Ismail
6	MF	MAS	Azannis Adzri
7	MF	MAS	Muhammad Izhar Rafi
8	MF	MAS	Razis Rasid
9	FW	MAS	Hazwan Hassan
11	MF	MAS	Firdaus Mohd Zuraimi
12	MF	MAS	Arif Nazdman Roslan
13	MF	MAS	Fakhrul Ahmad Foad Shazili
14	DF	MAS	Yusmal Daniel Hakim (captain)
15	DF	MAS	Abdul Hakim Bin Ibrahim
16	MF	MAS	Afief Syazwan Zairul Azlan
17	DF	MAS	Iman Rafaei
18	MF	MAS	Syed Muhammad Mikhail

No.	Pos.	Nation	Player
19	MF	MAS	Faizal Kadir
22	GK	MAS	Danish Irfan Junaidi
23	FW	MAS	Aliff Shahrul Firdaus
24	DF	MAS	Ahmad Farhan Hazim
25	MF	MAS	Haziq Mu'iz
26	DF	MAS	Daniel Haikal
27	DF	MAS	Afiq Shazwan
28	MF	MAS	Firdaus Kaironnisam
29	FW	MAS	Azrizan Ahmad
30	FW	MAS	Putra Salman Al Farisi
35	GK	MAS	Mohd Adib Haziq
42	DF	MAS	Abdul Muntaqim Jafelus
55	MF	MAS	Hazril Balqiez
65	MF	MAS	Shamil Sulaiman
88	MF	MAS	Syamer Abdullah

== Management ==
As of November 2026

Position	Name
Team manager	(Malaysia) Mohammad Faizal bin Mohd Noor
Assistant manager	(Malaysia) Wan Khairul Faiz bin Kamaruddin
Head coach	(Malaysia) Mohd Annif bin Mat Aman
Assistant coach	(Malaysia) Mohd Afifi bin Azizan (Malaysia) Mohd Sabireen Bin Mat Saad (Malaysia) Firdaus bin Izham
Physio	(Malaysia) Muhammad Wafdan bin Othman
Team coordinator	(Malaysia) Abdul Jalil bin Ramli
Kitman	(Malaysia) Azizi Matt Rose (Malaysia) Muhammad Al-Hafiz Bin Hamzah (Malaysia) Mohamad Izzat Bin Mohd Zalizan

== Honours ==
=== Domestic ===
League

- Perlis Super League
  - Runners-up (1): 2024–25

== See also ==
- Football in Malaysia
- Football Association of Perlis
