= MP Kubang Pasu F.C. =

Malaysian football club

MP Kubang Pasu
- Full name: Majlis Perbandaran Kubang Pasu Football Club
- Nickname: The Northern Warriors
- Short name: MPKP
- Ground: MPKP Mini Stadium, Jitra
- Capacity: 500
- Owner: Kubang Pasu Municipal Council
- League: Malaysia A2 Amateur League
| Home colours | Away colours | Third colours |

Majlis Perbandaran Kubang Pasu Football Club, simply known as MPKP, is a Malaysian football club based in Jitra, Kubang Pasu District, Kedah. The club is owned by the Kubang Pasu Municipal Council (Majlis Perbandaran Kubang Pasu) and currently competes in the Malaysia A2 Amateur League, the third tier of the Malaysian football league system.

== History ==
The club emerged as a representative for the Kubang Pasu District and has been active in local and state-level competitions. MPKP FC was listed among the invited participants of the Malaysia A2 Amateur League for the 2025–26 season. MPKP FC plays its home matches at MPKP Mini Stadium Jitra, which has a capacity of approximately 500 spectators.

== Players ==
=== Current squad ===
As of September 2025

Note: Flags indicate national team as defined under FIFA eligibility rules; some limited exceptions apply. Players may hold more than one non-FIFA nationality.

| No. | Pos. | Nation | Player |
|---|---|---|---|
| 1 | GK | MAS | Mohd Azrin Roslan |
| 2 | DF | MAS | Zulhareez Zulkeply |
| 3 | DF | MAS | Nizat Salleh |
| 4 | DF | MAS | Nizam Ab Wahed |
| 5 | DF | MAS | Akmar Fitri Ismail |
| 6 | MF | MAS | Noor Ikqmal Reezal |
| 7 | MF | MAS | Hakimey Ahmad Tajudin |
| 8 | DF | MAS | Ridzuan Rumlee |
| 9 | FW | MAS | Norhamizaref Hamid |
| 10 | FW | MAS | Wan Mohamad Alif |
| 11 | MF | MAS | Syafiq Ekias |
| 12 | DF | MAS | Hafiz Md Desa |

| No. | Pos. | Nation | Player |
|---|---|---|---|
| 13 | DF | MAS | Zulhelmi Abdul Razak |
| 14 | FW | MAS | Wan Mohamad Akmal Alif |
| 16 | DF | MAS | Abdullah Yusof (captain) |
| 17 | MF | MAS | Azrie Reza Zamri |
| 18 | DF | MAS | Osman Yusoff |
| 19 | DF | MAS | Azrel Mohamad Arif |
| 20 | MF | MAS | Aidil Adha Masri |
| 21 | MF | MAS | Atiqullah Halim |
| 22 | GK | MAS | Firdaus Azmi |
| 23 | DF | MAS | Hakim Mat Dzahir |
| 24 | FW | MAS | Amar Azhar |
| 25 | GK | MAS | Izham Shami |

== Management ==
As of February 2026

| Position | Name |
|---|---|
| Team manager | (Malaysia) Badrulhisham B. Sulaiman |
| Assistant manager | (Malaysia) Ismail B. Chek Saad |
| Head coach | |
| Assistant coach | (Malaysia) Fuziazmi B. Othman |
| Goalkeeper coach | (Malaysia) Ahmad Nazrie B. Hassan |
| Fitness coach | (Malaysia) Mohd Adi Erwan B. Abdul Rahim |
| Physio | (Malaysia) Amir Akmar B Sobri |
| Team official | (Malaysia) Mohammad Shuhairi B. Azizan |
| Team official | (Malaysia) Mohammad Hishammuddin B. Mohamad Hashim |
| Team official | (Malaysia) Mohd Khairul Aswad B. Zulkifly |
