= 2025–26 Malaysia A2 Amateur League =

Malaysian football season

Malaysia A2 Amateur League
- Dates: 12 September 2025 – 24 January 2026
- Champions: AZM Rovers
- Promoted: USM; AAK Puncak Alam
- Matches: 35
- Goals: 119 (3.4 per match)
- Top goalscorer: Fa'es Hafize (AAK Puncak Alam, 17 goals)
- Biggest home win: AAK Puncak Alam 8–0 KL Rangers (22 November 2025)
- Biggest away win: Sungai Merab 0–11 AAK Puncak Alam (20 September 2025)
- Highest scoring: 11 goals Sungai Merab 0–11 AAK Puncak Alam (20 September 2025)
- Longest winning run: AAK Puncak Alam (10 matches)
- Longest unbeaten run: AAK Puncak Alam (10 matches)
- Longest winless run: NS Forces Warriors (8 matches)
- Longest losing run: NS Forces Warriors (8 matches)
- Highest attendance: 539 (Kuantan City 1–1 YPM) (27 September 2025)
- Lowest attendance: 50 (Kubang Pasu-MPKP 1–1 Kuala Muda) (13 September 2025)
- All statistics correct as of 24 January 2026.

The 2025–26 Malaysia A2 Amateur League (Malay: Liga Amatur A2 Malaysia), formerly known as the Malaysia M4 League and Al-Ikhsan Cup for sponsorship reasons, was the fourth season of the Malaysia A2 Amateur League, the third tier football league of the Malaysian football league system.

Guar Syed Alwi (now Perlis GSA) were the defending champions, but will not defend the title as they compete in the 2025–26 Malaysia A1 Semi-Pro League. This year, the AFL has given 2 quotas of imported players under the age of 21 to each team competing.

== Competition format ==
The tournament is played as follows:

- League level: 21 teams are divided into Zone 1 (5 teams), Zone 2 (5 teams), Zone 3 (6 teams) and Zone 4 (5 teams), from the north, east foast, central, and south regions.
  - Round 1: Divided into four zones, each team will play at home and away to determine the position in the group. The top two teams in each zone, will advance to the knockout stage.
- Knockout stage: The knockout stage is the match to determine the winner. Finalists will be promoted to the 2026–27 Malaysia A1 Semi-Pro League.

== Schedule ==
The schedule of the competition was as follows.

Schedule for 2025–26 Malaysia A2 Amateur League
Phase		Number of fixtures	Date
Group stage
Group stage		10	12 September–29 November 2025
Knock-out stage
Quarter-finals	First leg	4	13 December 2025
Quarter-finals	Second leg	4	20 December 2025
Semi-finals	First leg	2	3 January 2026
Semi-finals	Second leg	2	10 January 2026
Final		1	24 January 2026

== Team changes ==
The following teams have changed division since the 2025–26 season.

=== To A2 Amateur League ===
Relegated from the A1 Semi-Pro League

- Kuala Lumpur Rovers
- (Selangor) UiTM United
- (Pahang) YPM FC

Promoted from the Malaysia A3 Community League

- Bintong – Perlis Super League champion
- Kuala Perlis Titans – Perlis Super League runner-up
- AZM Rovers – PUC A3 Kelantan Champions League runner-up
- (Selangor) MOF-Sungai Merab – Putrajaya A3 Community League champion
- Raub – Pahang Amateur League champion
- Kuantan City – Pahang Amateur League quarter-finalist
- (Malacca) MBMB Warriors – Melaka A3 Community League (Division 1) champion
- (Malacca) Duyong Fighters – Melaka A3 Community League (Division 1) participant
- (Negeri Sembilan) PUSEN Hornet – Seremban Football A3 Community League champion
- (Negeri Sembilan) Teck Hin-KR – Seremban Football A3 Community League runner-up
- NS Forces Warriors – Negeri Sembilan A3 Community Super League runner-up

Invited teams

- (Putrajaya) ACeIO
- (Kuala Lumpur) KL Rangers
- (Kedah) Kubang Pasu-MPKP
- (Penang) USM

=== From A2 Amateur League ===
Promoted to the A1 Semi-Pro League

- (Perlis) Guar Syed Alwi
- Kelantan WTS

Relegated to the A3 Community League

- (Negeri Sembilan) BR United
- (Putrajaya) JAKIM
- (Selangor) MAHSA United
- (Negeri Sembilan) MP Port Dickson
- (Selangor) NBK Empire
- (Perak) Pencinta Setia
- (Negeri Sembilan) Real Mambau
- (Malacca) SAMB
- (Selangor) Selayang City
- (Pahang) Semantan Troopers
- (Putrajaya) SJ Virtuosos

Teams withdrawn

- (Selangor) Harini^{^{1}}
- (Negeri Sembilan) Ayrish^{^{2}}
- (Selangor) Baarz^{^{2}}
- (Selangor) FR One Four^{^{2}}
- (Malacca) Sungai Putat^{^{2}}
- (Negeri Sembilan) UiTM Negeri Sembilan^{^{2}}

=== Name changes ===
- (Selangor) AAK Ultimate was renamed to AAK Puncak Alam
- (Negeri Sembilan) PUSEN KSRNS was renamed to PUSEN Hornet
- (Negeri Sembilan) 24 Warriors were renamed to NS Forces Warriors
- (Negeri Sembilan) Teck Hin was renamed to Teck Hin-KR

Notes:

^1 Originally relegated from the A1 Semi-Pro League, however the teams were not registered to the 2025–26 Malaysia A2 Amateur League due to unknown reasons.

^2 Originally were promoted to the 2025–26 Malaysia A2 Amateur League by winning their respective leagues; however the teams were not registered due to unknown reasons.

== Draw ==
North (Zone 1) Teams (Kedah) Kuala Muda (Kedah) Kubang Pasu-MPKP (Perlis) Bintong^{↑} Kuala Perlis Titans^{↑} (Penang) USM	East Coast (Zone 2) Teams Kuala Lumpur Rovers^{↓} (Pahang) YPM FC^{↓} (Pahang) Raub ^{↑} (Pahang) Kuantan City^{↑} (Kelantan) AZM Rovers^{↑}	Central (Zone 3) Teams (Selangor) AAK Puncak Alam (Selangor) UiTM United^{↓} (Selangor) MOF-Sungai Merab^{↑} (Kuala Lumpur) Kampong Ku (Kuala Lumpur) KL Rangers^{↑} (Putrajaya) ACEIO	South (Zone 4) Teams (Negeri Sembilan) PUSEN Hornet^{↑} (Negeri Sembilan) Teck Hin^{↑} (Negeri Sembilan) NS Forces Warriors^{↑} (Malacca) Duyong Fighters^{↑} (Malacca) MBMB Warriors^{↑}

^{↓}	Relegated from the A1 League
^{↑}	Promoted from the A3 League

== Venues ==
Team	Location	Stadium	Capacity
(Selangor) AAK Puncak Alam	Puncak Alam	Kuala Selangor Stadium, Kuala Selangor	10,000
(Putrajaya) ACEIO	Putrajaya	UKM Bangi Stadium	2,000
(Kelantan) AZM Rovers	Ketereh	Machang District Council Football Field	1,000
(Perlis) Bintong	Bintong	UiTM Perlis Sports Complex, Arau	1,000
(Malacca) Duyong Fighters	Duyong	UTeM Stadium, Durian Tunggal Tun Fatimah Stadium	1,000
(Kuala Lumpur) Kampong Ku	Kampung Baru, Kuala Lumpur	Rhino Arena, KSS	3,500
(Kuala Lumpur) KL Rangers	Setiawangsa	MPAJ Stadium, Ampang Jaya	1,000
Kuala Lumpur Rovers	Cheras	Kuala Lumpur Stadium	18,000
(Kedah) Kuala Muda	Kuala Muda	Sungai Petani Municipal Council Sports Complex	2,500
Kuala Perlis Titans	Kuala Perlis	UniMAP Stadium, Pauh	500
(Pahang) Kuantan City	Kuantan	Arena MBK Kuantan	1,000
(Kedah) Kubang Pasu-MPKP	Kubang Pasu	MPKP Mini Stadium, Jitra	5,000
(Malacca) MBMB Warriors	Malacca City	Tun Fatimah Stadium Hang Tuah Stadium	1,000
(Negeri Sembilan) NS Forces Warriors	Nilai	Seriemas SportsPlex	500
(Negeri Sembilan) PUSEN Hornet	Bandar Sri Sendayan	Sendayan Air Base Stadium	500
(Pahang) Raub	Raub, Pahang	Raub District Council Sports Complex Field	1,000
(Selangor) MOF-Sungai Merab	Sepang	INSPEN Stadium, Kajang	3,000
(Negeri Sembilan) Teck Hin-KR	Seremban Putrajaya	UiTM Seremban 3 football field Putrajaya Sports Arena	500
(Selangor) UiTM United	Shah Alam	UiTM Shah Alam Sports Complex Football Field	500
(Penang) USM	Gelugor	USM Athletics Stadium	1,000
(Pahang) YPM FC	Kuantan	Darul Makmur Stadium	40,000

== Locations ==
Locations of teams in the 2025–26 Malaysia A2 Amateur League
Blue: Zone 1; Red: Zone 2; Green: Zone 3; Yellow: Zone 4;
Klang Valley (Central Zone)

== Personnel, kits and sponsoring ==
Team	Head coach	Captain	Kit manufacturer	Kit sponsors	
Team	Head coach	Captain	Kit manufacturer	Main	Other(s)
(Selangor) AAK Puncak Alam	(Malaysia) Hasmawi Hassan	(Malaysia) Saiful Ridzuwan	(Malaysia) AAK Sportswear	KY Line	List: Front: Back: Sleeves: AAK Life; Shorts:
(Kuala Lumpur) ACEIO	(Malaysia) Omar Salim	(Malaysia) Ahmad Basheer Anas Sam Sur			List: Front: Back: Altr Sports; Sleeves: Shorts:
(Kelantan) AZM Rovers	(Malaysia) Wan Mohd Tarmizi Wan Ismail	(Malaysia) Badhri Radzi	(Malaysia) AUSS Apparel	AZM Scaffolding & Machinery	List: Front: Ar-Rizqin Dental Clinic, Asia Travel; Back: AZM Bina Gemilang; Sleeves: AZM Bina Gemilang; Shorts:
(Perlis) Bintong	(Malaysia) Mohd Shahabuddin Kadir	(Malaysia) Muhammad Syamer Abdullah	(Malaysia) Fexie Wear	Kimie Z Fried Chicken	List: Front: Back: Fexie Wear; Sleeves: Shorts:
(Malacca) Duyong Fighters	(Malaysia) Mohd Noor Derus	(Malaysia) Firdaus Ya'akub	(Malaysia) ZeroFour	MRS Synergy Prima	List: Front: Back: Zero Four, Al Habshee Car Rental; Sleeves: Zero Four; Shorts:
(Kuala Lumpur) Kampong Ku	(Malaysia) Muhd Faiz Ramly	(Malaysia) Muhammad Azrul Razman	(Malaysia) UMU Jersey	MZST KgKuFC Forever	List: Front: Back: Sleeves: Shorts:
(Kuala Lumpur) KL Rangers	(Malaysia) Mohd Rosni Abd Hamid	(Malaysia) Mugunthen A/L Sivakumar	(Malaysia) Kaki Jersi	Allianz	List: Front:Kopa Group, Skyworld, MRT Corp, Back: Sleeves: Lebih Masa Podcast, Revive Isotonic Brand; Shorts:
(Kedah) Kuala Muda	(Malaysia) Koet King Heyong	(Malaysia) Firdaus Abd Rahman	(United States) Nike (Malaysia) Tritoni	None Tritoni	List: Front: Back: Sleeves: Shorts:
Kuala Perlis Titans	(Malaysia) Faizal Abu Bakar	(Malaysia) Syazwan Zainon	(Malaysia) Geliga Jersey	COPA	List: Front: Geliga; Back: Nyiru Klasik Ikan Bakar, MJ Bina; Sleeves: Shorts:
(Pahang) Kuantan City	(Malaysia) Bahazenan Osman	(Malaysia) Hasnul Zaim	(Malaysia) Cend4w4n Sublimate	Kuantan City Council	List: Front: Back: Sleeves: Shorts:
(Kedah) Kubang Pasu-MPKP	(Malaysia) Akmal Rizal	(Malaysia) Abdullah Yusof	(Malaysia) Grand Worldwide	Mzfa Setia Teguh Enterprise / Grand Worldwide	List: Front: Back: Sleeves: Shorts:
(Malacca) MBMB Warriors	(Malaysia) Hazlani Hj.Jaafar	(Malaysia) Ahmad Saufi Ibrahim	(Malaysia) ZeroFour	World Tourism Day 2025	List: Front: Back: Sleeves: Malacca City Council; Shorts:
(Negeri Sembilan) NS Forces Warriors	(Malaysia) Suhairy Johari	(Malaysia) Mohamad Noraiman Talib	(Malaysia) KimiCom Jersey	Ayam Rempah JANK	List: Front: Back: KimiCom Jersey; Sleeves: Shorts:
(Negeri Sembilan) PUSEN Hornet	(Malaysia) Mohd Noor Ali	(Malaysia) 'Ammar Mohd Zain	(Malaysia) Zakir	Zakir Marketing	List: Front: Back: Sleeves: Shorts:
(Pahang) Raub	(Malaysia) Izzudin Danuri	(Malaysia) Amin Mozri	(Malaysia) Hakka Clo		List: Front: Back: Sleeves: Shorts:
(Selangor) MOF-Sungai Merab	(Malaysia) Azman Jaafar	(Malaysia) Mohd Halim Che Hassan	(Malaysia) Made by club		List: Front: Back: Sleeves: Shorts:
(Negeri Sembilan) Teck Hin	(Malaysia) Roslan Othman	(Malaysia) Khairul Faizzuhri	(Malaysia) D’Mensi Legacy		List: Front: Back: Sleeves: Shorts:
(Selangor) UiTM United	(Malaysia) Fairuz Abdul Aziz	(Malaysia) Muhammad Syazman Jefry	(Malaysia) Let's Play Performance		List: Front: Back: Sleeves: Shorts:
(Penang) USM	(Malaysia) Azizul Ahmad Sabri	(Malaysia) Mohd Redzuan Suhaidi	(Malaysia) Line7		List: Front: Back: Sleeves: Shorts:
(Pahang) YPM FC	(Malaysia) Syed Farul Hakim Syied Mahmud	(Malaysia) Azamuddin Akil	(Indonesia) Noto	YP Maintenance Sdn. Bhd.	List: Front: Back: SLP Studios, Tok Gajah Forever, Eeva Florist; Sleeves: Legasi 06; Shorts:

== Foreign players ==
The number of foreign players is restricted to two per each team.

Note: Flags indicate national team as has been defined under FIFA eligibility rules. Players may hold more than one non-FIFA nationality.

Team	U21 player 1	U21 player 2	Former player ^{3}
AAK Puncak Alam			
ACEIO	(Guinea) **Oumar Keita**		
AZM Rovers			
Bintong			
Duyong Fighters	(Nigeria) **Silas Abednego Uzondu**		(Ghana) Favour Nii Didier Lamptey (Ghana) Lucky Amenyo
Kampong Ku			
KL Rangers			
Kuala Lumpur Rovers			
Kuala Muda			
Kuala Perlis Titans			
Kuantan City			
Kubang Pasu-MPKP			
MBMB Warriors			
NS Forces Warriors			
PUSEN Hornet			
Raub			
Sungai Merab			
Teck Hin			
UiTM United			
USM			
YPM FC			

- Players name in **bold** indicates that the player was registered during the mid-season transfer window.
- **^3** Foreign players who left their teams or were de-registered from the playing squad due to medical issues or other matters.

== Standings ==
=== Zone 1 (North) ===
Pos	Team	Pld	W	D	L	GF	GA	GD	Pts	Promotion or qualification	USM	KPT	KUB	KUA	BIN
1	USM FC	8	8	0	0	22	3	+19	24	Advance to knockout round & A1 Semi-Pro League		5–1	3–0	3–0	2–0
2	Kuala Perlis Titans	8	3	1	4	9	12	−3	10	Advance to knockout round	1–3		1–0	2–0	1–2
3	Kubang Pasu-MPKP	8	2	2	4	7	11	−4	8		1–2	1–3		1–1	1–0
4	Kuala Muda	8	1	4	3	7	11	−4	7		0–2	0–0	1–1		2–2
5	Bintong	8	2	1	5	5	13	−8	7		0–2	1–0	0–2	0–3	

Updated to match(es) played on 6 December 2025. Source: FAM-CMS
Legend: Blue = home team win; Yellow = draw; Red = away team win.
Rules for classification: 1) Points; 2) Goal difference; 3) Number of goals scored.

==== Fixtures and results ====
League matchdays (1st round)

===== Matchweek 1 =====
13 September 2025	Bintong	1–0	Kuala Perlis Titans	Arau
16:45 UTC+8	Haikal Alif 62'	Report		Stadium: Uitm Perlis Sports Complex; Attendance: 126

13 September 2025	Kubang Pasu-MPKP	1–1	Kuala Muda	Jitra
16:45 UTC+8	Norhamizaref 35' (pen.)	Report	Firdaus 70' (pen.)	Stadium: MPKP Mini Stadium; Attendance: 50

===== Matchweek 2 =====
20 September 2025	Kuala Muda	2–2	Bintong	Sungai Petani
16:45 UTC+8	Syafiq Rahilah 18'; Yazman Hafiz 81'	Report	Abdul Hakim Ibrahim 15'; Iskandar Azzarfan 90+1'	Stadium: Sungai Petani Municipal Council Sports Complex; Attendance: 300

20 September 2025	USM	3–0	Kubang Pasu-MPKP	Gelugor
16:45 UTC+8	Aidil Danial 40', 44'; Aminuddin Abu Bakar 66'	Report		Stadium: USM Stadium; Attendance: 200

===== Matchweek 3 =====
27 September 2025	Kuala Perlis Titans	1–3	USM	Pauh
16:45 UTC+8	Shamil Sulaiman 19'	Report	Syahmi Syakir 17'; Aminuddin 45+2', 80'	Stadium: UniMAP Stadium; Attendance: 100

28 September 2025	Kubang Pasu-MPKP	1–0	Bintong	Jitra
16:45 UTC+8	Akmal Alif 19'	Report		Stadium: MPKP Mini Stadium; Attendance: 50

===== Matchweek 4 =====
4 October 2025	USM	3–0	Kuala Muda	Gelugor
16:45 UTC+8	Aidil Danial 9'; Aminuddin Abu Bakar 37'; Fauzi Kadar 79'	Report		Stadium: USM Stadium; Attendance: 100

4 October 2025	Kuala Perlis Titans	1–0	Kubang Pasu-MPKP	Pauh
16:45 UTC+8	Syazwan Zainon 39'	Report		Stadium: UniMAP Stadium; Attendance: 80

===== Matchweek 5 =====
11 October 2025	Bintong	0–2	USM	Arau
16:45 UTC+8				Stadium: Uitm Perlis Sports Complex

11 October 2025	Kuala Muda	0–0	Kuala Perlis Titans	Sungai Petani
16:45 UTC+8				Stadium: Sungai Petani Municipal Council Sports Complex

League matchdays (2nd round)

===== Matchweek 6 =====
25 October 2025	Kuala Perlis Titans	1–2	Bintong	Arau
16:45 UTC+8				Stadium: UniMAP Stadium

25 October 2025	Kuala Muda	1–1	Kubang Pasu-MPKP	Sungai Petani
16:45 UTC+8				Stadium: Sungai Petani Municipal Council Sports Complex

===== Matchweek 7 =====
1 November 2025	Bintong	0–3	Kuala Muda	Arau
16:45 UTC+8		Report		Stadium: Uitm Perlis Sports Complex

1 November 2025	Kubang Pasu-MPKP	1–2	USM	Jitra
16:45 UTC+8		Report		Stadium: MPKP Mini Stadium

===== Matchweek 8 =====
8 November 2025	Bintong	0–2	Kubang Pasu-MPKP	Arau
16:45 UTC+8		Report		Stadium: Uitm Perlis Sports Complex

8 November 2025	USM	5–1	Kuala Perlis Titans	Gelugor
16:45 UTC+8		Report		Stadium: USM Stadium

===== Matchweek 9 =====
22 September 2025	Kuala Muda	0–2	USM	Sungai Petani
16:45 UTC+8		Report		Stadium: Sungai Petani Municipal Council Sports Complex

22 September 2025	Kubang Pasu-MPKP	1–3	Kuala Perlis Titans	Jitra
16:45 UTC+8		Report		Stadium: MPKP Mini Stadium

===== Matchweek 10 =====
6 December 2025	USM	2–0	Bintong	Gelugor
16:45 UTC+8	Fauzi Kadar 89'; Aidil Danial 90+3'	Report		Stadium: USM Stadium

6 December 2025	Kuala Perlis Titans	2–0	Kuala Muda	Pauh
16:45 UTC+8	Syazwan Zainon 16'; Hafiz Ikhmal 87' (pen.)	Report		Stadium: UniMAP Stadium

=== Zone 2 (East coast) ===
Pos	Team	Pld	W	D	L	GF	GA	GD	Pts	Promotion or qualification	AZM	YPM	KUA	RAU	KLR
1	AZM Rovers (C)	6	5	0	1	13	3	+10	15	Advance to knockout round		1–0	1–0	7–0	
2	YPM FC	6	3	1	2	11	8	+3	10	Advance to knockout round	2–0		1–3	4–2	
3	Kuantan City	6	3	1	2	8	5	+3	10		0–1	1–1		2–0	
4	Raub	6	0	0	6	5	21	−16	0		1–3	1–3	1–2		
5	Kuala Lumpur Rovers	0	0	0	0	0	0	0	0	Withdrawn			0–3		

Updated to match(es) played on 29 November 2025. Source: FAM-CMS
Legend: Blue = home team win; Yellow = draw; Red = away team win.
Rules for classification: 1) Points; 2) Goal difference; 3) Number of goals scored.
(C) Champions

==== Fixtures and results ====
League matchdays (1st round)

===== Matchweek 1 =====
12 September 2025	YPM FC	2–0	AZM Rovers	Kuantan
16:45 UTC+8	Danish Azami 39'; Nasyrullah Zaki 48'	Report		Stadium: Darul Makmur Stadium; Attendance: 526

13 September 2025	Kuala Lumpur Rovers	0–3	Kuantan City	Cheras, Kuala Lumpur
16:45 UTC+8		Awarded		Stadium: Kuala Lumpur Stadium

===== Matchweek 2 =====
20 September 2025	Kuantan City	2–0	Raub	Kuantan
16:45 UTC+8	Luqman Hakim 34'; Fitri Aziq 37'	Report		Stadium: Arena MBK Kuantan; Attendance: 512

===== Matchweek 3 =====
27 September 2025	Kuantan City	1–1	YPM FC	Kuantan
16:45 UTC+8	Syahmie Rosli 80'	Report	Nasyrullah Zaki 86'	Stadium: Arena MBK Kuantan; Attendance: 539

27 September 2025	Raub	1–3	AZM Rovers	Raub, Pahang
16:45 UTC+8	Izzat 5'	Report	Ikmal Hisham 38'; Adam Danial 45+2'; Aiman Fitrie 78'	Stadium: Raub District Council Sports Complex Field; Attendance: 150

===== Matchweek 4 =====
4 October 2025	Raub	1–3	YPM FC	Raub, Pahang
16:45 UTC+8	Lokman Bah Din 11'	Report	Alif Farhan 27'; Nasyrullah Zaki 63'; Danish Azami 67'	Stadium: Raub District Council Sports Complex Field; Attendance: 200

===== Matchweek 5 =====
11 October 2025	AZM Rovers	1–0	Kuantan City	Machang
16:45 UTC+8				Stadium: Machang District Council Football Field

League matchdays (2nd round)

===== Matchweek 6 =====
25 October 2025	YPM FC	4–2	Raub	Gambang, Pahang
16:45 UTC+8		Report		Stadium: SSMP Mini Stadium

===== Matchweek 7 =====
1 November 2025	AZM Rovers	1–0	YPM FC	Machang
16:45 UTC+8		Report		Stadium: Machang District Council Football Field

===== Matchweek 8 =====
8 November 2025	Raub	1–2	Kuantan City	Raub, Pahang
16:45 UTC+8		Report		Stadium: Raub District Council Sports Complex Field

===== Matchweek 9 =====
22 November 2025	YPM FC	1–3	Kuantan City	Kuantan
16:45 UTC+8				Stadium: Darul Makmur Stadium

22 November 2025	AZM Rovers	7–0	Raub	Machang
16:45 UTC+8				Stadium: Machang District Council Football Field

===== Matchweek 10 =====
29 November 2025	Kuantan City	0–1	AZM Rovers	Kuantan
16:45 UTC+8				Stadium: Arena MBK Kuantan

=== Zone 3 (Central) ===
Pos	Team	Pld	W	D	L	GF	GA	GD	Pts	Promotion or qualification	AAK	ACE	KGK	SGM	UIT	KLR
1	AAK Puncak Alam	10	10	0	0	47	2	+45	30	Advance to knockout round & A1 Semi-Pro League		3–0	2–1	4–1	4–0	8–0
2	ACEIO	10	6	2	2	18	16	+2	20	Advance to knockout round	0–4		1–0	1–0	2–2	4–2
3	Kampong Ku	10	3	3	4	16	13	+3	12		0–2	2–2		4–0	2–0	1–1
4	MOF-Sungai Merab	10	3	1	6	9	25	−16	10		0–11	1–3	2–0		0–0	3–1
5	UITM United	10	2	2	6	11	18	−7	8		0–1	2–3	1–4	1–0		4–0
6	KL Rangers	10	1	2	7	8	35	−27	5		0–8	0–2	2–2	0–2	2–1	

Updated to match(es) played on 29 November 2025. Source: FAM-CMS
Legend: Blue = home team win; Yellow = draw; Red = away team win.
Rules for classification: 1) Points; 2) Goal difference; 3) Number of goals scored.

==== Fixtures and results ====
League matchdays (1st round)

===== Matchweek 1 =====
13 September 2025	AAK Puncak Alam	3–0	ACEIO	Kuala Selangor
16:45 UTC+8	Fa'es Hafize 14'; Idrzuwan Daud 46'; Naufal Akif 66'	Report		Stadium: Kuala Selangor Stadium; Attendance: 100

13 September 2025	Kampong Ku	4–0	MOF-Sungai Merab	Kampung Baru, Kuala Lumpur
16:45 UTC+8	Ridhwan Johan 21', 64'; Rudi Hasun 68', 85'	Report		Stadium: Rhino Arena, KSS; Attendance: 159

13 September 2025	UiTM United	4–0	KL Rangers	Shah Alam
16:45 UTC+8	Mirza Malik 57'; Syazwan 60'; Kadim As Syahid 65'; Shazril Uzair 77'	Report		Stadium: UiTM Sports Complex Football Field; Attendance: 55

===== Matchweek 2 =====
20 September 2025	MOF-Sungai Merab	0–11	AAK Puncak Alam	Kajang
16:45 UTC+8		Report	Fa'es Hafize 15', 19', 28', 44', 59'; Shukor Azmi 21'; Hafiz Izzudin 33'; Wan Faiz 37'; Idrzuwan Daud 52'; Faris Kamardin 58', 64'	Stadium: INSPEN Stadium; Referee: 300

21 September 2025	ACEIO	2–2	UiTM United	Bangi
16:45 UTC+8	Ajwad Khairie 1'; Shazwan Shahrudin 44'	Report	Putra Daniel Danies 39', 62'	Stadium: UKM Bangi Stadium; Attendance: 102

21 September 2025	KL Rangers	2–2	Kampong Ku	Cyberjaya
16:45 UTC+8	Affifudin Rahimi 40'; Faizzudin Abidin 55'	Report	Syakimi Karim 34'; Ridhwan Johan 58'	Stadium: MMU Stadium; Attendance: 85

===== Matchweek 3 =====
27 September 2025	AAK Puncak Alam	4–0	UiTM United	Kuala Selangor
16:45 UTC+8	Fa'es Hafize 20'; Hafiz Izzudin 55'; Shukor Azmi 67' (pen.); Muzaimir Abdul Hadi 90+1'	Report		Stadium: Kuala Selangor Stadium; Attendance: 130

27 September 2025	MOF-Sungai Merab	3–1	KL Rangers	Kajang
16:45 UTC+8	Hakim Zainal 7'; Amirul 22'; Anuar Zulkifli 57'	Report	A. Thiruchelvan 10'	Stadium: INSPEN Stadium; Attendance: 250

27 September 2025	Kampong Ku	2–2	ACEIO	Kajang
16:45 UTC+8	Ridhwan Johan 42'; Syafiq Redzuan 75'	Report	Izzai Fathi 17'; Khairu Azrin 32'	Stadium: Kajang Prison Complex Mini Stadium; Attendance: 90

===== Matchweek 4 =====
4 October 2025	KL Rangers	0–8	AAK Puncak Alam	Setapak
16:45 UTC+8		Report	Hafiz Izzudin 7'; Sukri Hamid 14'; Fa'es Hafize 33'; Naufal Akif 41'; Dzulfahmi Hadi 53', 65'; Faris Kamardin 83'; Muzaimir Hadi 90+3'	Stadium: Kuala Lumpur Sports Arena; Attendance: 101

4 October 2025	UiTM United	1–4	Kampong Ku	Shah Alam
16:45 UTC+8	Shazril Usair 10'	Report	Farhan Hamid 4'; Asyraf Fadzli 28'; Dzarif Idham 32' (o.g.); Al-Amin 49'	Stadium: UiTM Shah Alam Sports Complex Football Field; Attendance: 106

4 October 2025	ACEIO	1–0	MOF-Sungai Merab	Bangi
16:45 UTC+8	Izzai Fathi 74'	Report		Stadium: UKM Bangi Stadium; Attendance: 75

===== Matchweek 5 =====
11 October 2025	AAK Puncak Alam	2–1	Kampong Ku	Kuala Selangor
16:45 UTC+8				Stadium: Kuala Selangor Stadium

11 October 2025	MOF-Sungai Merab	0–0	UiTM United	Kajang
16:45 UTC+8				Stadium: INSPEN Stadium

11 October 2025	ACEIO	4–2	KL Rangers	Kajang
16:45 UTC+8				Stadium: Kajang Prison Complex Mini Stadium

League matchdays (2nd round)

===== Matchweek 6 =====
25 October 2025	ACEIO	0–4	AAK Puncak Alam	Kajang
16:45 UTC+8				Stadium: Kajang Prison Complex Mini Stadium

25 October 2025	MOF-Sungai Merab	2–0	Kampong Ku	Bangi
16:45 UTC+8				Stadium: BSN Training Centre Stadium

25 October 2025	KL Rangers	2–1	UiTM United	Ampang Jaya
20:45 UTC+8	Nurshamil 24'; Faizzudin Abidin 24'	Report	45' (o.g.) Danish Daniya	Stadium: MPAJ Stadium

===== Matchweek 7 =====
1 November 2025	UiTM United	2–3	ACEIO	Shah Alam
16:45 UTC+8		Report		Stadium: UiTM Shah Alam Sports Complex Football Field

1 November 2025	Kampong Ku	1–1	KL Rangers	Kampung Baru, Kuala Lumpur
16:45 UTC+8		Report		Stadium: Rhino Arena, KSS

16 November 2025	AAK Puncak Alam	4–1	MOF-Sungai Merab	Kuala Selangor
16:45 UTC+8		Report		Stadium: Kuala Selangor Stadium

===== Matchweek 8 =====
8 November 2025	UiTM United	0–1	AAK Puncak Alam	Shah Alam
16:45 UTC+8		Report		Stadium: UiTM Shah Alam Sports Complex Football Field

8 November 2025	ACEIO	1–0	Kampong Ku	Kajang
16:45 UTC+8		Report		Stadium: Kajang Prison Complex Mini Stadium

8 November 2025	KL Rangers	0–2	MOF-Sungai Merab	Ampang Jaya
20:45 UTC+8		Report		Stadium: MPAJ Stadium

===== Matchweek 9 =====
22 November 2025	AAK Puncak Alam	8–0	KL Rangers	Kuala Selangor
16:45 UTC+8				Stadium: Kuala Selangor Stadium

22 November 2025	Kampong Ku	2–0	UiTM United	Kampung Baru, Kuala Lumpur
16:45 UTC+8				Stadium: Rhino Arena, KSS

22 November 2025	MOF-Sungai Merab	1–3	ACEIO	Kajang
16:45 UTC+8				Stadium: INSPEN Stadium

===== Matchweek 10 =====
29 November 2025	Kampong Ku	0–2	AAK Puncak Alam	Kampung Baru, Kuala Lumpur
16:45 UTC+8				Stadium: Rhino Arena, KSS

29 November 2025	KL Rangers	0–2	ACEIO	Ampang Jaya
16:45 UTC+8				Stadium: MPAJ Stadium

29 November 2025	UiTM United	1–0	MOF-Sungai Merab	Shah Alam
16:45 UTC+8				Stadium: UiTM Shah Alam Sports Complex Football Field

=== Zone 4 (South) ===
Pos	Team	Pld	W	D	L	GF	GA	GD	Pts	Promotion or qualification	TEK	MBM	DUY	PUS	N9F
1	Teck Hin-KR	8	6	2	0	21	4	+17	20	Advance to knockout round		3–1	2–2	3–1	1–0
2	MBMB Warriors	8	5	0	3	20	11	+9	15	Advance to knockout round	0–5		1–2	4–1	3–0
3	Duyong Fighters	8	4	2	2	17	6	+11	14		0–0	0–1		5–0	4–0
4	PUSEN Hornet	8	3	0	5	8	21	−13	9		0–3	0–3	2–1		1–0
5	NS Forces Warriors	8	0	0	8	2	26	−24	0		0–4	0–7	0–3	2–3	

Updated to match(es) played on 29 November 2025. Source: FAM-CMS
Legend: Blue = home team win; Yellow = draw; Red = away team win.
Rules for classification: 1) Points; 2) Goal difference; 3) Number of goals scored.

==== Fixtures and results ====
League matchdays (1st round)

===== Matchweek 1 =====
13 September 2025	Duyong Fighters	4–0	NS Forces Warriors	Durian Tunggal
16:45 UTC+8	Shamerul Abd Aziz 5', 74' Faris Amsyar 27' Afiq Norizan 90'	Report		Stadium: UTeM Stadium; Attendance: 350

13 September 2025	PUSEN Hornet	0–3	MBMB Warriors	Bandar Sri Sendayan
16:45 UTC+8		Report	Luqmanul Hakeem 70', 84'; Syazly Adly 90+4'	Stadium: Sendayan Air Base Stadium; Attendance: 200

===== Matchweek 2 =====
20 September 2025	Teck Hin-KR	3–1	PUSEN Hornet	Seremban
16:45 UTC+8	Abdul Mubin Wahab 35'; Alifh Aiman 40'; Ranggi Oftawan 45+3'	Report	Fazlan Zulhairie 50'	Stadium: UiTM Seremban 3 Football field Attendance: 100

21 September 2025	MBMB Warriors	1–2	Duyong Fighters	Krubong
16:45 UTC+8	Harith Roslan 77' (pen.)	Report	Shameer Hairuddin 21'; Shamerul Abd Aziz 48'	Stadium: Hang Jebat Stadium; Attendance: 450

===== Matchweek 3 =====
27 September 2025	PUSEN Hornet	2–1	Duyong Fighters	Bandar Sri Sendayan
16:45 UTC+8	Izzul Azmi 11'; Shahrul Asmadin 19'	Report	Firdaus Ya'akub 15'	Stadium: Sendayan Air Base Stadium; Attendance: 100

28 September 2025	NS Forces Warriors	0–4	Teck Hin-KR	Nilai
16:45 UTC+8		Report	Amir Shaifulniza 9'; Syafiq Zahari 19'; Nurzaidi Bunari 72'; Khairul Faizzuhri 75'	Stadium: Seriemas SportsPlex; Attendance: 250

===== Matchweek 4 =====
4 October 2025	Teck Hin-KR	3–1	MBMB Warriors	Seremban
16:45 UTC+8	Lokman Hakim 44'; Abdul Mubin Wahab 50' (pen.); Badrul Amin Hamid 86'	Report	Lukmanul Hakeem 62' (pen.)	Stadium: UiTM Seremban 3 Football field Attendance: 157

5 October 2025	NS Forces Warriors	2–3	PUSEN Hornet	Nilai
16:45 UTC+8	Syafiq Nasaruddin 61'; Aidil Firdaus 67'	Report	Shahrul Asmadin 15', 58', 72'	Stadium: Seriemas SportsPlex; Attendance: 350

===== Matchweek 5 =====
11 October 2025	Duyong Fighters	0–0	Teck Hin-KR	Semabok
16:45 UTC+8				Stadium: Tun Fatimah Stadium

11 October 2025	MBMB Warriors	3–0	NS Forces Warriors	Melaka City
16:45 UTC+8				Stadium: Hang Tuah Stadium

League matchdays (2nd round)

===== Matchweek 6 =====
25 October 2025	MBMB Warriors	4–1	PUSEN Hornet	Krubong
16:45 UTC+8				Stadium: Hang Jebat Stadium

25 October 2025	NS Forces Warriors	0–3	Duyong Fighters	Nilai
16:45 UTC+8				Stadium: Seriemas SportsPlex

===== Matchweek 7 =====
1 November 2025	Duyong Fighters	0–1	MBMB Warriors	Melaka City
16:45 UTC+8		Report		Stadium: Tun Fatimah Stadium

1 November 2025	PUSEN Hornet	0–3	Teck Hin-KR	Bandar Sri Sendayan
16:45 UTC+8		Report		Stadium: Sendayan Air Base Stadium

===== Matchweek 8 =====
8 November 2025	Duyong Fighters	5–0	PUSEN Hornet	Melaka City
16:45 UTC+8	Shamerul 15', 74', 90'; Atif Hanif 26'; Nassar 46'	Report		Stadium: Tun Fatimah Stadium

8 November 2025	Teck Hin-KR	1–0	NS Forces Warriors	Putrajaya
16:45 UTC+8	Fakrul Aiman 44'	Report		Stadium: Putrajaya Sports Arena

===== Matchweek 9 =====
22 November 2025	PUSEN Hornet	1–0	NS Forces Warriors	Bandar Sri Sendayan
16:45 UTC+8				Stadium: Sendayan Air Base Stadium

22 November 2025	MBMB Warriors	0–5	Teck Hin-KR	Melaka City
16:45 UTC+8				Stadium: Hang Tuah Stadium

===== Matchweek 10 =====
29 November 2025	Teck Hin-KR	2–2	Duyong Fighters	Putrajaya
16:45 UTC+8				Stadium: Putrajaya Sports Arena

29 November 2025	NS Forces Warriors	0–7	MBMB Warriors	Nilai
16:45 UTC+8		Report	Khairul Hazwan 11', 14'; Saiful Mustafa 16', 21' (pen.), 80'; Ariff Zaini 23', 32'	Stadium: Seriemas SportsPlex

== Knockout round ==
=== Bracket ===
Quarter-finals
MBMB Warriors	2	0	2
USM	5	2	7
YPM	0	1	1
AAK Puncak Alam	0	2	2
ACeIO	1	0	1
AZM Rovers	1	3	4
Kuala Perlis Titans	2	1	3
Teck Hin-KR	0	2	2

Semi-finals
USM	0	2	2
AAK Puncak Alam	0	1	1
AZM Rovers	0	2	2
Kuala Perlis Titans	0	1	1

Final
USM	0
AZM Rovers	3

== Quarter-finals ==
The first legs were played on 13 December, and the second legs on 20 December 2025.

=== Summary ===
Team 1	Agg.	Team 2	1st leg	2nd leg
MBMB Warriors	2–7	USM	2–5	0–2
YPM	1–2	AAK Puncak Alam	0–0	1–2
ACeIO	1–4	AZM Rovers	1–1	0–3
Kuala Perlis Titans	3–2	Teck Hin-KR	2–0	1–2

=== Matches ===
First leg

13 December 2025
20:45 MYT

MBMB Warriors	2–5	USM
Harith Roslan 67' (pen.); Ikram Zainal 73'	Report	16' Aidil Danial; 23' Akmal Rizal; 51' Aminuddin Abu Bakar; 89' Najiy Samsul Amri; 90+5' Fauzi Kadar

Hang Jebat Stadium, Krubong
Referee: Muhammad Usaid bin Jamal

Second leg

20 December 2025
20:45 MYT

USM	2–0	MBMB Warriors
Amirul Syahmi 60' (o.g.); Fauzi Kadar 90+1'	Report

USM Athletics Stadium, Penang
Referee: Khairul Fadzri Naim bin Yusri

USM won 7–2 on aggregate.

First leg

13 December 2025
16:45 MYT

YPM	0–0	AAK Puncak Alam
	Report

SSMP Mini Stadium, Gambang, Pahang
Referee: Amirul Zamir bin Abd Jamil

Second leg

20 December 2025
16:15 MYT

AAK Puncak Alam	2–1	YPM
Idrzuwan Daud 45+2'; Fa'es Hafize 46'	Report	53' Arif Syazwan

Kuala Selangor Stadium, Kuala Selangor
Referee: Muhammad Harris Sharuddin

AAK Puncak Alam won 2–1 on aggregate.

First leg

13 December 2025
16:45 MYT

ACeIO	1–1	AZM Rovers
Syahirul Fazly 76' (pen.)	Report	62' Raziman Roslan

Kajang Prisons Mini Stadium, Kajang
Referee: Zam Azwan Khan Bin Rashid Khan

Second leg

20 December 2025
16:15 MYT

AZM Rovers	3–0	ACeIO
Raziman Roslan 30'; Haiqal Ikram 41'; Adam Danial 64'	Report

Machang District Council Football Field, Machang
Referee: Wan Nor Azlan Wan Abdullah

AZM Rovers won 4–1 on aggregate.

First leg

14 December 2025
16:45 MYT

Kuala Perlis Titans	2–0	Teck Hin-KR
Syazwan Zainon 33'; Liinesh Raaj 47'	Report

UniMAP Stadium, Pauh
Referee: Muhammad Shukor Zulkiflee

Second leg

20 December 2025
16:15 MYT

Teck Hin-KR	2–1	Kuala Perlis Titans
Fakrul Aiman 52'; Amir Firdaus 75' (pen.)	Report	43' Afief Syazwan

MMU Stadium, Cyberjaya
Referee: Mohd Hafizuan Mohd Khair

Kuala Perlis Titans won 3–2 on aggregate.

== Semi-finals ==
The first legs were played on 3 January, and the second legs on 10 January 2026.

=== Summary ===
Team 1	Agg.	Team 2	1st leg	2nd leg
USM	2–1	AAK Puncak Alam	0–0	1–2
AZM Rovers	2–1	Kuala Perlis Titans	0–0	1–2

=== Matches ===
First leg

3 January 2026
16:30 MYT

USM	0–0	AAK Puncak Alam
	Report

USM Athletics Stadium, Penang
Attendance: Kamal Ikhwan bin Yaacob

Second leg

10 January 2026
16:15 MYT

AAK Puncak Alam	1–2	USM
Sukri Hamid 76'	Report	Aidil Danial 88'; Syazwi Suhaimi 90'

Kuala Selangor Stadium, Kuala Selangor
Referee: Mohd Ridzuan Husni

First leg

3 January 2026
16:30 MYT

AZM Rovers	0–0	Kuala Perlis Titans
	Report

Machang District Council Football Field, Machang
Referee: Khairul Anuar bin Abdullah

Second leg

10 January 2026
16:15 MYT

Kuala Perlis Titans	1–2	AZM Rovers
Yusmal 85'	Report	Aiman Fitrie 22', 41'

UniMAP Stadium, Pauh
Referee: Mohd. Hazwan Hashim

== Final ==
The final was played at the Selayang Municipal Council Stadium.

24 January 2026
20:45 MYT

USM	0–3	AZM Rovers
	Report	Aiman Fitrie 5', 90+1'; Raziman Roslan 25'

Selayang Municipal Council Stadium, Selayang
Referee: Mohd Ridzuan Husni

== Winners ==
Champions of 2025–26 Malaysia A2 Amateur League

AZM Rovers
First Title

== Season statistics ==
=== Top goalscorers ===
As of 24 January 2026

Rank	Player	Team	Goals
1	(Malaysia) Fa'es Hafize	AAK Puncak Alam	18
2	(Malaysia) Shamerul Abd Aziz	Duyong Fighters	9
3	(Malaysia) Izzai Fathi Ramli	MOF-Sungai Merab	8
4	(Malaysia) Adam Danial	AZM Rovers	7
4	(Malaysia) Aidil Danial	USM	7
6	(Malaysia) Faris Kamardin	AAK Puncak Alam	6
6	(Malaysia) Aiman Fitrie	AZM Rovers	6
6	(Malaysia) Ridhwan Johan	Kampong Ku	6
6	(Malaysia) Fakrul Aiman	Teck Hin-KR	6
10	(Malaysia) Shukor Azmi	AAK Puncak Alam	5
10	(Malaysia) Hafiz Izzudin	AAK Puncak Alam	5
10	(Malaysia) Aminuddin Abu Bakar	USM	5
10	(Malaysia) Fauzi Abdul Kadar	USM	5
14	(Malaysia) Ariff Zaini	MBMB Warriors	4
14	(Malaysia) Nor Harith Roslan	MBMB Warriors	4
14	(Malaysia) Shahrul Asmadin	PUSEN Hornet	4
14	(Malaysia) Daniel Irfan	USM	4
14	(Malaysia) Nasyrullah Zaki	YPM	4
19	13 players	8 clubs	3

=== Own goals ===
As of 4 October 2025

Rank	Player	Team	Against	Date	Goal
1	(Malaysia) Dzarif Idzham	UiTM United	KGKU	4 October 2025	1–4

=== Hat-tricks ===
As of 29 November 2025

Player	For	Against	Result	Date
(Malaysia) Fa'es Hafize ^{5}	AAK Puncak Alam	Sungai Merab	0–11 (A)	20 September 2025
(Malaysia) Shahrul Asmadin	PUSEN Hornet	NS Forces Warriors	2–3 (A)	5 October 2025
(Malaysia) Shamerul Abd Aziz	Duyong Fighters	PUSEN Hornet	5–0 (H)	8 November 2025
(Malaysia) Daniel Irfan	USM	Kuala Perlis Titans	5–1 (H)	8 November 2025
(Malaysia) Saiful Mustafa	MBMB Warriors	NS Forces Warriors	0–7 (A)	29 November 2025

Notes

^{4} Player scored 4 goals
^{5} Player scored 5 goals
^{9} Player scored 9 goals
(H) – Home team
(A) – Away team

== See also ==
- 2025–26 Malaysia Super League
- 2025–26 Malaysia A1 Semi-Pro League
- 2025–26 Malaysia A3 Community League
