= Kuantan City FC =

Malaysian football club

Kuantan City
- Full name: Kuantan City Football Club
- Short name: KCFC
- Founded: 2022; 4 years ago, as Cendawan FC
- Ground: Arena MBK Kuantan
- Capacity: 1,000
- Owner: Kuantan City Council
- Head coach: Bahazenan Bin Osman
- League: Malaysia A2 Amateur League
Home colours	Away colours

Kuantan City Football Club (Malay: Kelab Bolasepak Majlis Bandaraya Kuantan) is a Malaysian football club based in Kuantan, Pahang. The club is owned by the Kuantan City Council (Majlis Bandaraya Kuantan) and currently competes in the Malaysia A2 Amateur League, the third tier of the Malaysian football league system.

== History ==
The club was founded in 2022 as Cendawan FC and participated in the MY Liga Pahang, a state-level competition under the Malaysia M5 League (fifth tier). In their debut season, the club finished as runners-up, earning promotion to the Malaysia M4 League in 2023. The club was rebranded as Kuantan City FC to reflect its backing by the Kuantan City Council. By 2025, Kuantan City achieved further success in the Pahang Amateur League, reaching the quarter-finals and securing promotion to the Malaysia A2 Amateur League for the 2025–26 season.

== Players ==
=== Current squad ===
As of September 2025

Note: Flags indicate national team as defined under FIFA eligibility rules; some limited exceptions apply. Players may hold more than one non-FIFA nationality.

No.	Pos.	Nation	Player
1	GK	MAS	Ikmal Hakimi (captain)
4	DF	MAS	Syahmie Rosli
5	MF	MAS	Nur Zhafir Zaini
6	FW	MAS	Ariff Che Jusoh
7	FW	MAS	Luqman Hakim
8	MF	MAS	Fakrullah Syarafuddin
9	MF	MAS	Amer Syafeeq
11	MF	MAS	Haiqal Nabil
12	GK	MAS	Daniel Wafiuddin
13	MF	MAS	Izwan Siteh
14	MF	MAS	Asiff Osama
15	MF	MAS	Hazuan Daud
16	DF	MAS	Haziq Mustaqim
17	MF	MAS	Fitri Aziq

No.	Pos.	Nation	Player
18	DF	MAS	Nur Za’im Zaini
19	MF	MAS	Norhafizan Jailani
20	MF	MAS	Amirul Haikal
21	DF	MAS	Sheikh Mohammad Faris
22	MF	MAS	Syazwan Mohd Zukri
23	DF	MAS	Hezri Sham
24	FW	MAS	Iman Syakir
25	MF	MAS	Fawwaz Muqrish
26	MF	MAS	Haziq Izzuddin
27	DF	MAS	Fatah Fathi
29	DF	MAS	Hafizul Hazriq
33	GK	MAS	Zamir Zaini
34	DF	MAS	Zaidee Jamaluddin
38	FW	MAS	Adam Alif
44	DF	MAS	Hasnul Zaim

== Club officials ==
As of September 2025

Management
Position	Name
Chief executive officer	(Malaysia) Dato' Zaliza Bin Zulkipli
Chief operating officer	(Malaysia) Hj. Mohd Nizam Bin Mahayuddin
Team manager	(Malaysia) Kamarulazlan bin Mohd Pati
Assistant team manager	(Malaysia) Abdullah Bin Abdul Aziz

Coaching staff
Position	Name
Head coach	(Malaysia) Bahazenan Bin Osman
Assistant head coach	(Malaysia) Ahmad Ridzuan Bin Abdul Halim
Assistant coach	(Malaysia) Mohamad Firdaus Bin Anuar
Goalkeeping coach	(Malaysia) Zakaria Bin Abu Bakar
Assistant Goalkeeping coach	(Malaysia) Nazrul Shahrin Bin Abdul Mutalib
Fitness coach	(Malaysia) Muhammad Firdaus Bin Paris
Physio	(Malaysia) Muhammad Izwan Bin Ismail
Team official	(Malaysia) Ahmad Khusyairi Bin Ahmad Khairil
Kitman	(Malaysia) Mohd Shafiq Fadzli Bin Saleh (Malaysia) Muhammad Imran Bin Mohd Anuar

== Season by season record ==
Season	Division	Position	Malaysia Cup	Malaysian FA Cup	Malaysian Charity Shield	Top scorer (all competitions)
2022	M5 League	Runners-up	DNQ	DNQ	DNQ	Unknown
2023	M4 League	4th (Zone 2) relegated	DNQ	DNQ	DNQ	(Malaysia) Mohamad Ridhwan bin Maidin (1)
2024–25	A3 Community League	Quarter-finals	DNQ	DNQ	DNQ	Unknown
2025–26	A2 Amateur League	3rd (East Coast Zone)	DNQ	DNQ	DNQ	6 players (1)

Champions	Runners-up	Third place	Promoted	Relegated

== Honours ==
=== Domestic ===
League

- Pahang Amateur League
  - Runners-up (1): 2022

== See also ==
- Football in Malaysia
- Football Association of Pahang
