= Kuala Lumpur Rangers F.C. =

Malaysian football club

KL Rangers
- Full name: Kuala Lumpur Rangers Football Club
- Nickname: The Rangers
- Short name: KLR
- Founded: 8 August 2018; 7 years ago, as Setiawangsa Rangers FC
- Ground: Setiawangsa Stadium; MPAJ Stadium; Kuala Lumpur Sports Arena
- Capacity: 1,000
- President: Nik Nazmi
- Head coach: Mohd Rosni Abd Hamid
- League: Malaysia A2 Amateur League
- Website: https://klrangers.com
| Home colours | Away colours |

Kuala Lumpur Rangers Football Club (Malay: Kelab Bolasepak Kuala Lumpur Rangers) is a Malaysian football club based in Setiawangsa. They currently play in the Malaysia A2 Amateur League, the third tier of the Malaysian football league system. KL Rangers operate both men's and women's football teams, along with youth development programs through their academy.

== History ==
Founded in August 2018 as Setiawangsa Rangers Football Club, they got rebranded to Kuala Lumpur Rangers Football Club in February 2025. Kuala Lumpur Rangers Football Club is an affiliate member of the Kuala Lumpur Football Association, also a bronze member of the Superimau Charter of the Malaysian Football Association. After the 2024–25 Kuala Lumpur League season, they were invited to the Malaysia A2 Amateur League.

== Players ==
=== Current squad ===
As of 25 October 2025

Note: Flags indicate national team as defined under FIFA eligibility rules; some limited exceptions apply. Players may hold more than one non-FIFA nationality.

| No. | Pos. | Nation | Player |
|---|---|---|---|
| 1 | GK | MAS | Amirul Firdaus |
| 2 | DF | MAS | Danish Daniya |
| 3 | DF | MAS | Ikhram Zainal Abidin |
| 4 | DF | MAS | Mugunthen A/L Sivakumar (captain) |
| 5 | MF | MAS | Roshan A/L Sivakumar |
| 6 | DF | MAS | Azwari Abdullah |
| 7 | FW | MAS | Khyril Muhymeen |
| 8 | MF | MAS | Faizzudin Abidin |
| 9 | FW | MAS | Amir Mukhriz |
| 10 | FW | MAS | Efendi Adnan |
| 11 | FW | MAS | Brosnan Athi |
| 12 | DF | MAS | Farid Ashraf |
| 13 | FW | MAS | Nurin Nuqman |
| 14 | DF | MAS | Daniel Saiful Rizal |
| 17 | DF | MAS | Harraz Aniq |

| No. | Pos. | Nation | Player |
|---|---|---|---|
| 18 | DF | MAS | Jazli Yusoff |
| 19 | MF | MAS | Nurshamil Abd Ghani |
| 21 | FW | MAS | Fakhrul Nordin |
| 22 | FW | MAS | Affifudin Rahimi |
| 23 | DF | MAS | Sidiq Minggu |
| 24 | FW | MAS | Arif Hakimi |
| 27 | MF | MAS | Fakrur Izzat |
| 28 | MF | MAS | Annas Rahmat |
| 30 | GK | MAS | Asyraf Zainal |
| 32 | GK | MAS | Idham Shah |
| 66 | FW | MAS | Haikal Yusri Feisal |
| 77 | GK | MAS | Aizat Roslim |
| 80 | MF | MAS | Farhan Izzani |
| 89 | FW | MAS | Mahalli Jasuli |
| 99 | MF | MAS | Waliyuddin Rosdi |

== Kit manufacturers and shirt sponsors ==
| Season | Kit manufacturer | Main sponsors | Other sponsors |
|---|---|---|---|
| 2023–24 | QR Apparels | SLAÉ Cosmetics, ÆON BiG | Extra Joss, CRSC Group, ST Rosyam Mart, 8055 Coffee, Keramattea |
| 2024 | Kaki Jersi | EkoSetiawangsa, ÆON BiG | |
| 2025– | Kaki Jersi | Allianz, MRT Corp, Revive Isotonic Brand, Kopa Group | Skyworld, Lebih Masa Podcast |

== See also ==
- Kuala Lumpur Rangers F.C. (women)
