= Raub F.C. =

Malaysian football club

Raub-STW
- Full name: Raub Football Club
- Short name: RFC-STW
- Founded: 1998; 28 years ago
- Ground: Raub District Council Sports Complex Field
- Capacity: 1,000
- Owner: Raub Football Association
- Head coach: Radzi Batutalam
- League: Malaysia A2 Amateur League
- 2025–26: Group stage -4th (East Coast Group)
- Website: https://raub-fc.com/en/
Home colours	Away colours

Raub-STW Football Club (Malay: Kelab Bolasepak Raub-STW) is a Malaysian football club based in Raub, Pahang. The club currently plays in the Malaysia A2 Amateur League, the third tier of the Malaysian football league system.

== History ==
In 2024, Raub FC emerged as champions of the Liga Amatur Pahang (Pahang Amateur League), defeating Sri Tonkin FC 3–1 in the final held at Tun Abdul Razak Stadium, Jengka. This victory secured their promotion to the 2025–26 Malaysia A2 Amateur League. During the 2024–25 Pahang Amateur League, Raub FC topped Zone 1 West, registering 3 wins, 3 draws, and finishing with 12 points from 8 matches, progressing to the tournament’s knockout stage.

During the 2025-26 Malaysia A2 Amateur League , Raub FC competed in the East Coast Group and finished 4th in the group stage, recording 0 wins, 0 draws, and 6 losses.

Ahead of the 2026-27 Malaysia A2 Amateur League, Raub FC merged with STW Jelai F.C. to form Raub-STW FC. The newly formed club continued to compete in the Malaysia A2 Amateur League and retained Raub FC's previous home ground.

== Players ==
=== Current squad ===
As of 21 November 2026

Note: Flags indicate national team as defined under FIFA eligibility rules; some limited exceptions apply. Players may hold more than one non-FIFA nationality.

No.	Pos.	Nation	Player
1	GK	MAS	Johari Mat Hamidi (captain)
2	MF	MAS	Faieqal Danish Norfaizal
3	DF	MAS	Meor Haizal Amri
4	MF	MAS	Faris Ridzuan
5	MF	MAS	Khairuzan Azwar Sidik
6	MF	MAS	Muhammad Azrul Ismail
7	FW	MAS	Zaiful Zakwan Attan
8	MF	MAS	Zulkarnain Rashdan
9	FW	MAS	Lokman Bah Din
10	FW	MAS	Yusri Afif Mahabu
11	MF	MAS	Fariz Idzwan Mahadi
12	DF	MAS	Khairul Zaman Mozri
13	MF	MAS	Mohamad Aidil Mukhreez
14	FW	MAS	Nur Izzat Che Awang
15	MF	MAS	Nur Aiqal Nazri

No.	Pos.	Nation	Player
16	MF	MAS	Aniq Umair Arrayyan
17	MF	MAS	Mohd Alif Syauqi
18	GK	MAS	Wan Mohamad Harris Haikal
19	DF	MAS	Aqil Danish Ahmat Zaini
20	GK	MAS	Abdul Rahim Hasibullah
21	DF	MAS	Anuar Bah Jat
22	GK	MAS	Isma Iqbal Muhamad
23	DF	MAS	Nor Iman Zaquan
24	MF	MAS	Farid Amirul Adnan
25	FW	MAS	Reduan Mahadi a/l Murdi
26	DF	MAS	Aliff Najmi Rusli
27	DF	MAS	Kamaruzzaman Mozri
28	DF	MAS	Izzul Islam Muhammad Noor
29	MF	MAS	Ikmal Zainuddin Abdullah
30	DF	MAS	Nabil Mohd Zukeri

== Management ==
Management
Position	Name
Team manager	(Malaysia) Jamizan Jamaludin
Head coach	(Malaysia) Muhammad Izzuddin Bin Danuri
Assistant coach	(Malaysia) Khairudin bin Abdullah
Goalkeeper coach	(Malaysia) Mohd Asri bin Mohd Nafi
Fitness coach	(Malaysia) Ahmad Fitri Bin Abu Bakar @ Kasim
Physio	(Malaysia) Azizan bin Bahari (Malaysia) Mohd Hafiz bin Yusoff
Team staff	(Malaysia) Muhamad Amirul Zawawi (Malaysia) Mohamad Hafez bin Mohd Nor (Malaysia) Mohamad Shamfuliza Bin Azami (Malaysia) Saparudin bin Abdul Latif (Malaysia) Mohd Radzi Mohd Nor Azmi
Team media	(Malaysia) Mohamad Hanif Zulhilmi
Kitman	(Malaysia) Mohd Nor Hismail (Malaysia) Faiz bin Mahamad Isa

== Honours ==
=== Domestic ===
League

- Pahang Amateur League
  - Champions (1): 2024–25

== See also ==
- Football in Malaysia
- Football Association of Pahang
