= AZM Rovers F.C. =

Malaysian football club

AZM Rovers
- Full name: AZM Rovers Football Club
- Nickname: Jiwa Kelantan
- Short name: AZMRFC
- Founded: 2022; 4 years ago
- Ground: Machang District Council Football Field
- Capacity: 1,000
- Owner: Amin Zubair Muhammad
- Head coach: Wan Mohd Tarmizi Wan Ismail
- League: Malaysia A2 Amateur League
- 2025–26: A2 Amateur League, champions
Home colours	Away colours	Third colours

AZM Rovers Football Club (Malay: Kelab Bolasepak AZM Rovers) is a Malaysian football club based in Ketereh, Kelantan. The club last played in the Malaysia A2 Amateur League, the 3rd tier of the Malaysian football league system. AZM Rovers are recognized for their grassroots development programs and football culture in Kelantan.

== History ==
AZM Rovers FC began competing in district-level competitions, gradually gaining prominence in state tournaments. In the 2024–25 season, the club participated in the Malaysia A3 Community League and secured promotion to the 2025–26 Malaysia A2 Amateur League. In January 2025, the club signed a strategic collaboration with the District Youth and Sports Office of Kota Bharu, aiming to develop football talent at the grassroots level. Training programs were introduced for children up to five years old. On 24 January 2026, AZM Rovers clinched the Malaysia A2 Amateur League title, securing promotion to the Malaysia A1 Semi-Pro League after defeating USM 3–0 in the final.

== Crests and colours ==
The club’s home kit features red as the primary colour, with black and white patterns, while away kit uses black and gold trim. It is manufactured by AUSS Apparel.

2022

2026

== Players ==
As of September 2025

Note: Flags indicate national team as defined under FIFA eligibility rules; some limited exceptions apply. Players may hold more than one non-FIFA nationality.

No.	Pos.	Nation	Player
1	GK	MAS	Danial Walizah @ Amri
5	DF	MAS	Effizul Haikal
7	MF	MAS	Hafiz Hakimi
8	FW	MAS	Mohamad Fikram
10	FW	MAS	Adam Danial
11	FW	MAS	Abdul Halim Ghazali
12	DF	MAS	Danish Ikram
14	MF	MAS	Faruqi Zakaria
16	MF	MAS	Badhri Radzi (captain)
17	MF	MAS	Aiman Fitrie Ismail
18	FW	MAS	Arsyad Mohd Azhari
19	MF	MAS	Alif Haikal Mokhtar
20	GK	MAS	Ahmad Adib
21	DF	MAS	Hazim Mohammad Azmi
22	DF	MAS	Zulfahmi Mohd Skilee

No.	Pos.	Nation	Player
23	MF	MAS	Adam Shaari
24	DF	MAS	Luqman Hakim Othman
25	DF	MAS	Adli Ahamad
27	MF	MAS	Wan Alif Aiman Rosmaidi
29	DF	MAS	Ikmal Hisham Saufian
30	GK	MAS	Nik Atiq Soh
33	MF	MAS	Aidil Syazran Sukarno
39	FW	MAS	Amirul Furqan Muiez
42	FW	MAS	Mustaqim Abdullah
44	DF	MAS	Aqiel Khalis Badrul
45	MF	MAS	Nurhan Darwisy Romainor

== Club officials ==
As of September 2025

Management
Position	Name
Chairman	(Malaysia) Amin Zubair Muhammad
Team manager	(Malaysia) Mahizi Mahmood
Assistant team manager	(Malaysia) Khairul Zal Azmi Zahinudden
Assistant team manager	(Malaysia) Muhd Shafik Md Kasim

Coaching staff
Position	Name
Head coach	(Malaysia) Wan Mohd Tarmizi Wan Ismail
Assistant coach	(Malaysia) Wan Zaman
Goalkeeping coach	(Malaysia) Shahrizan Ismail
Team doctor	(Malaysia) Mohd Nazam Harun
Physio	(Malaysia) Razin Abdul Rahman Fakri Razi
Team staff	(Malaysia) Amin Zubair Muhamad
Team admin	(Malaysia) Nik Fakhrurazi Nik Ali (Malaysia) Nik Fakhrurazi Bin Nik Ali
Team media	(Malaysia) Mohamad Idham Mohammad Nadzri
Kitman	(Malaysia) Karim Abdul Pata

== Honours ==
=== Domestic ===
League

- Malaysia A2 Amateur League
  - Champions (1): 2025–26
- Malaysia A3 Community League
  - Runners-up (1): 2024–25
- Ketereh 9-a-side Championship
  - Champions (1): 2024
- Liga Mahabbah
  - Champions (1): 2023–24

== See also ==
- Football in Malaysia
- Kelantan FA
