= Bintong F.C. =

Malaysian football club

Bintong
- Full name: Bintong Football Club
- Founded: 2023; 3 years ago
- Ground: UiTM Perlis Sports Complex
- Capacity: 1,000
- Head coach: Mohd Shahabuddin Bin Kadir
- League: Malaysia A2 Amateur League
Home colours	Away colours

Bintong Football Club (Malay: Kelab Bolasepak Bintong) is a Malaysian football club based in Bintong Kangar, Perlis. The club currently plays in the Malaysia A2 Amateur League, the third tier of the Malaysian football league system.

== History ==
Founded In 2023, Bintong FC participated in the Perlis Super League in 2024, a regional competition established to cultivate local talent in Perlis. Among eight participating teams, Bintong FC stood out for securing a considerable achievement for a grassroots-level football club. They went on to become champions of the 2024–25 Perlis Super League, which earned them promotion by merit to the 2025–26 Malaysia A2 Amateur League.

== Players ==
=== Current squad ===
As of September 2025

Note: Flags indicate national team as defined under FIFA eligibility rules; some limited exceptions apply. Players may hold more than one non-FIFA nationality.

No.	Pos.	Nation	Player
3	DF	MAS	Alif Danael Fadzil
6	MF	MAS	Wan Zulhilmi Mustaffa
7	FW	MAS	Syafiq Md Aizul
8	MF	MAS	Syamer Abdullah (captain)
9	FW	MAS	Hamizul Izaidi
10	FW	MAS	Haikal Alif Razaidi
11	FW	MAS	Alias Abd Karim
12	DF	MAS	Hanif Haikal
13	GK	MAS	Firdaus Abdullah
15	DF	MAS	Abdul Hakim Ibrahim
16	MF	MAS	Khalis Iqbal Salman
17	DF	MAS	Farhan Roslie
19	MF	MAS	Izry Aiman Zamree

No.	Pos.	Nation	Player
20	MF	MAS	Amirul Amri Zamri
21	FW	MAS	Ahmad Shakir Ali
22	GK	MAS	Izzat Danial Zulhairi
23	MF	MAS	Thaqif Irfan Ridzuan
25	DF	MAS	Nurhaziq Nordin
26	DF	MAS	Sairul Ikram Shafri
27	DF	MAS	Fakhri Mohd Zain
28	MF	MAS	Syahmir Norhisham
33	GK	MAS	Aniq Najmi
41	DF	MAS	Abdul Muntaqim Jafelus
42	MF	MAS	Syahmi Hamzi
49	DF	MAS	Syarul Naim
71	MF	MAS	Faizal Abdul Razak
77	MF	MAS	Iskandar Azzafran

== Management ==
As of September 2025

Position	Name
Team manager	(Malaysia) Mohamad Ezaidie Bin Zulkafli
Head coach	(Malaysia) Mohd Shahabuddin Bin Kadir
Assistant coach	(Malaysia) Muhammad Imran Bin Azizi
Goalkeeper coach	(Malaysia) Iqram Alif Bin Ibrahim
Fitness coach	(Malaysia) Akmal Hanif Bin Chek Pi
Physio	(Malaysia) Noorhisyam Bin Rosli
Team admin	(Malaysia) Haziq Mirza Bin Abdul Karim
Masseur	(Malaysia) Muhd Nur Ikhwan Bin Muhd Nasir
Kitman	(Malaysia) Mohammad Nashruddin Bin Abu Samah

== Honours ==
=== Domestic ===
League

- Perlis Super League
  - Champions (1): 2024–25

== See also ==
- Football in Malaysia
- Football Association of Perlis
