= PUSEN Hornet F.C. =

Malaysian football club

PUSEN Hornet
- Full name: Pangkalan Udara Sendayan Hornet Football Club
- Nickname: The Hornets
- Short name: PHFC
- Founded: 2022; 4 years ago, as PUSEN KSRNS
- Dissolved: 2026; 0 years ago, merged with Seremban United F.C.
- Ground: Sendayan Air Base Stadium
- Capacity: 500
- Owner: TUDM Sendayan
- Head coach: Mohd Noor Bin Ali
- League: Malaysia A2 Amateur League
- Website: www.pusen-hornet-fc.com
Home colours	Away colours

PUSEN Hornet Football Club (Malay: Kelab Bolasepak Pangkalan Udara TUDM Sendayan) was a Malaysian football club based in Bandar Sri Sendayan, Negeri Sembilan. The club formerly played in the Malaysia A2 Amateur League, the third tier of the Malaysian football league system.

== History ==
The club was founded In 2022 as PUSEN KSRNS, before adopting the name PUSEN Hornet. In 2024, PUSEN Hornet became the champion of the Seremban A3 Community League and qualified for the 2025–26 Malaysia A2 Amateur League.

=== Merger (2026) ===
In August 2026, Seremban United FC announced a historic partnership with PUSEN Hornet FC. The Amateur Football League (AFL) officially approved the merger, allowing the combined club to enter the 2026–27 Malaysia A2 Amateur League season under the unified banner PUSEN-Seremban United.

== Stadium ==
PUSEN Hornet played its home matches at the Sendayan Air Base Stadium in Bandar Sri Sendayan, a ground with a capacity of approximately 500 spectators.

== Colours and crest ==
The club's identity was symbolised by a yellow and black hornet-themed crest, reflecting its nickname. The same colours were used in the club's primary kits.

== Players ==
As of September 2025

Note: Flags indicate national team as defined under FIFA eligibility rules; some limited exceptions apply. Players may hold more than one non-FIFA nationality.

No.	Pos.	Nation	Player
1	GK	MAS	Khairul Aizam
2	DF	MAS	Hanis Baharom
3	MF	MAS	Mohd Nor Azaruddin
4	DF	MAS	Ammar Mohd Akhir
5	DF	MAS	Aifaa Mat Baliya
7	MF	MAS	Md Shahrul Asmadin
8	MF	MAS	Shazwan Sayuati
9	FW	MAS	Hamizan Mohd Nor
10	MF	MAS	Amirull Nashriq
11	MF	MAS	Syazwan Mustaffa
12	DF	MAS	Radzuan Lizam
14	MF	MAS	Ibrahim Muhamat
15	DF	MAS	'Ammar Mohd Zain (captain)
17	FW	MAS	Fitri Nizam

No.	Pos.	Nation	Player
18	MF	MAS	Gobalan a/l Verapan
19	MF	MAS	Zulkifly Azali
21	GK	MAS	Firdaus Ikhmal
22	FW	MAS	Hamdan Abu Jamrah
23	MF	MAS	Saiful Yusman
24	DF	MAS	Aniq Hakim
26	DF	MAS	Amierrul Asyraff
29	DF	MAS	Fazal Asyraf
32	MF	MAS	Faiz Mhd Shanol
38	MF	MAS	Izzmal Aizza
39	GK	MAS	Hasrul Amirudin
42	MF	MAS	Shamsuddin Abd Rahman
49	MF	MAS	Fazlan Zukhairie
77	MF	MAS	'Izzul Azmi
88	FW	MAS	Najmi Hassan

== Management ==
As of September 2025

Position	Name
Team manager	(Malaysia) Mazri Ezwan Bin Murkhtar
Head coach	(Malaysia) Mohd Noor Bin Ali
Assistant coach	(Malaysia) Muhd Safian Bin Abu Bakar
Goalkeeper coach	(Malaysia) Mohammad Sukri Bin Mahussin
Fitness coach	(Malaysia) Hasni Hafizzul Bin Ahmad Sabri
Physio	(Malaysia) Zainal Bin Jalil
Team admin	(Malaysia) Nor Aziruddin Bin Muhammad
Team media	(Malaysia) Mohamad Nazri Bin Robai
Kitman	(Malaysia) Muhamad Nor Bin Mohamed

== Season by season record ==
Season	Division	Position	Malaysia Cup	Malaysian FA Cup	Malaysian Charity Shield	Top scorer (all competitions)
2023	Liga M5/A-Ligue Nismilan	5th (Group B)	DNQ	DNQ	DNQ	Unknown
2024–25	Liga A3	Champions	DNQ	DNQ	DNQ	Unknown
2025–26	Liga A2	4th (South Zone)	DNQ	DNQ	DNQ	(Malaysia) Md Shahrul Asmadin (4)

Champions	Runners-up	Third place	Promoted	Relegated

== Honours ==
=== Domestic ===
League

- Seremban A3 Community League
  - Champions (1): 2024–25

== See also ==
- Football in Malaysia
