= Football Association of Malaysia =

Governing body of association football in Malaysia

AFC
- Founded: 11 September 1926; 100 years ago
- Headquarters: Wisma FAM, Kelana Jaya, Selangor, Malaysia
- FIFA affiliation: 1954
- AFC affiliation: 1954
- AFF affiliation: 1984
- President: Dato’ Ab Ghani Bin Hassan
- General Secretary: Noor Azman Hj Rahman
- Website: fam.org.my

The Football Association of Malaysia (commonly abbreviated as FAM; Malay: Persatuan Bola Sepak Malaysia) is the national governing body of football in Malaysia, headquartered at Wisma FAM. The FAM is also one of the founding members of both the ASEAN Football Federation (AFF) and the Asian Football Confederation (AFC). It has been affiliated with FIFA since 1954. The FAM oversees the organisation and development of football and advancing the game at all levels in Malaysia, and is responsible for all aspects of the amateur and professional game in its territory. This includes the men's, women's and youth national football teams as well as the Malaysian Amateur Football League and Malaysia Premier Futsal League.

== History ==
=== Pre-independence football ===
The British introduced football to Malaya, and the locals quickly embraced the game, making it the country's leading sport. By the late 19th century, football had become a central activity in most sports clubs across Malaya, though it lacked proper structure. The establishment of the Selangor Amateur Football League in 1905 brought some administration and organization, but the competition remained limited to clubs in Kuala Lumpur.

In 1921, the battleship HMS Malaya visited the country. After competing in football and rugby matches with local teams, the officers and crew decided to commemorate the games by presenting trophies for annual competitions in both sports. This led to the establishment of a national football tournament involving all states in Malaya. Known initially as the Malaya Cup—later renamed the Malaysia Cup in 1963—the competition has been held continuously, except during the war years.

In 1906, the Selangor Association Football League was officially established. The SAFL was responsible for the administration of league competitions in Selangor. As soon league football gained firm in Selangor, the Selangor Football Association established a new tournament known as SFA Cup in 1926. This association began organizing tournaments, which inspired other states in Malaya to follow suit. Malacca, Negeri Sembilan, and Perak demonstrated a parallel institutional development in football governance, as Malacca established its football association in 1924, followed by Negeri Sembilan and Perak in 1926.

In 1932, the MFA was reorganized into the Football Association of Malaya (FAM). The committee decided to choose Kuala Lumpur as the headquarters due to its strategic geographical location. and the FAM took on responsibility for running the Malaya Cup competition.

The first FAM president was Sir Andrew Caldecott, followed by M.B. Shelley, Dr. J.S. Webster, S.D. Scott, R. Williamson, and Adrian Clark, who served until 1940. As Europe entered full-scale war with Germany, FAM operations moved from Singapore to Malaya, and A.R. Singham became the first Asian secretary in 1941. After the war, J.E. King became FAM's president, succeeded by H.P. Byson and then Dr. C. Rawson, who served for two years before the position was taken over by the first non-British president.

In 1951, Tunku Abdul Rahman—later Malaysia's first Prime Minister—was appointed as FAM president. Under his leadership, football in Malaysia entered a new phase, with the FAM playing a more prominent role beyond organizing the Malaysia Cup.

In 1956, FAM became one of the 14 founding members of the Asian Football Confederation (AFC). Two years later, it achieved full membership in FIFA.

=== After independence ===
Tunku Abdul Rahman's passion for football played a pivotal role in the construction of the Merdeka Stadium, which in 1957 became a historic site as the venue for Malaysia's independence declaration from Britain.

The stadium also marked the beginning of the Merdeka Tournament (Pestabola Merdeka), which was popularly referred to as the 'Mini Asia Cup' from the 1960s to the 1980s. The tournament was a significant success and inspired similar events such as the Jakarta Anniversary Tournament in Indonesia, the King's Cup in Thailand, and the President's Cup in South Korea. The inaugural tournament—then the premier football competition in Asia—was won by Hong Kong. Malaya claimed the title three consecutive times, winning in 1958 and 1959, and sharing it with South Korea in 1960. The country later qualified for the 1972 Summer Olympics in Munich and the 1980 Summer Olympics in Moscow.

In the early 1960s, the organization's name was officially changed to the Football Association of Malaysia (FAM). Tunku Abdul Rahman continued to promote football development, particularly through youth competitions, until his resignation in 1974. His successor, Malaysia's second Prime Minister, Tun Abdul Razak, held the post for one year before Hamzah Abu Samah took over in 1976. Hamzah, who was the Minister of Trade and Industry, introduced several initiatives to develop the sport.

Between 1976 and 1984, numerous football programs were implemented under Hamzah's leadership. The FAM entered a new phase when the Sultan of Pahang, Haji Ahmad Shah, assumed leadership. His tenure saw the introduction of the semi-professional league in 1989, which eventually transitioned into full professionalism. Despite these efforts, success on the international stage for Malaysia's national team remained elusive.

One of the highlights of Malaysian football history was hosting the 1997 FIFA World Youth Championship. Domestically, the league underwent several transformations, culminating in the establishment of the Malaysia Super League (M-League) in 2004. However, the national team suffered significant defeats in international competitions during this period.

On 13 September 2018, FAM received the AFC Dream Asia Award in the Developing Category. In 2019, FAM was also awarded the AFC Dream Asia Award (Bronze) in the Inspiring Category.

On 26 September 2025, FAM and seven Malaysian heritage players–Gabriel Palmero, Facundo Garcés, Rodrigo Holgado, Imanol Machuca, João Figueiredo, Jon Irazabal, and Hector Hevel–were sanctioned by FIFA due to falsification and forgery of documents regarding the seven players' eligibility to play in the third round of the 2027 AFC Asian Cup qualifiers against Vietnam. FAM was fined CHF 350,000 (around RM 1.9million), whereas each player was fined CHF 2,000 (around MR 10,560) and was suspended from football related activities for 12 months. FAM has confirmed an appeal against FIFA's sanctions. On 3 November 2025, the FIFA Appeal Committee rejected FAM's appeal. In light of the footballers naturalization falsification scandal, on 28 January 2026, all FAM exco members resign en masse.

== Associations affiliation ==
There are 20 football associations affiliated to the FAM. Besides the 14 FAs with regional location, six others are affiliated units.

=== State affiliation ===
State	Football association	Established
Johor	Johor Football Association (JFA)	1955
Kedah	Kedah Football Association (KFA)	1924
Kelantan	Football Association of Kelantan (KAFA)	1948
Kuala Lumpur	Kuala Lumpur Football Association (KLFA)	1975
Malacca	Melaka Football Association (MAFA)	1924
Negeri Sembilan	Negeri Sembilan Football Association (NSFA)	1923
Pahang	Football Association of Pahang (PBNP)	1959
Penang	Football Association Penang (FAP)	1921
Perak	Perak Football Association (PAFA)	1921
Perlis	Football Association of Perlis (PFA)	1963
Sabah	Sabah Football Association (SAFA)	1950
Sarawak	Football Association of Sarawak (FAS)	1974
Selangor	Football Association of Selangor (FAS)	1936
Terengganu	Football Association of Terengganu (TFA)	1956

=== Ethnic affiliation ===
Ethnicity	Football association
(Malaysia) Malaysian Malays	Malaysian Malay's Football Association (PBMM)
(Malaysia) Malaysian Chinese	Malaysian Chinese Football Association (MCFA)
(Malaysia) Malaysian Indians	Malaysian Indian Sports Council (MISC)

=== Uniformed service affiliation ===
Uniformed service	Football association
(Malaysia) Royal Malaysian Police	Royal Malaysian Police Football Association (RMPFA)
(Malaysia) Malaysian Armed Forces	Malaysian Armed Forces Football Association (AFFA)

=== Professional affiliation ===
Profession	Association
(Malaysia) Coaches	Football Coaches Association of Malaysia (PJBM)
(Malaysia) Players	Malaysian Professional Players Association (PFAM)
(Malaysia) Referees	Association of Referees

=== Super League affiliation ===
State	Club
Johor	Johor Darul Ta'zim
Kelantan	Kelantan Red Warrior
Kuala Lumpur	Kuala Lumpur City
Sarawak	Kuching City
Melaka	Melaka
Negeri Sembilan	Negeri Sembilan
(Malaysia) Royal Malaysian Police	PDRM
Penang	Penang
Sabah	Sabah
Selangor	Selangor
Kedah	Star City
Terengganu	Terengganu

== Competitions ==
The Football Association of Malaysia had run all top football competitions in Malaysia until 2015, when the Football Malaysia LLP (FMLLP), which is now known as the Malaysian Football League (MFL) was formed as part of the privatisation of the Malaysian football league system. The MFL took over all the top professional football competition previously managed by the FAM. The list below are the competitions which are managed by the Malaysia Football League since it inception in 2015:

- Liga Super
- Liga Premier (until 2022)
- Malaysia A1 Semi-Pro League
- Malaysia A2 Amateur League
- Malaysia A3 Community League
- Piala FA
- Piala Malaysia
- MFL Challenge Cup
- Piala Sumbangsih (Super Cup)
- MFL Cup (U23)

FAM also focuses on youth development football, women football and futsal leagues and tournaments in Malaysia.

- Malaysia National Women's League
- Piala Tun Sharifah Rodziah
- Piala Presiden (U21)
- Piala Belia (U19)
- Liga Puteri-FAM (U16)
- MPFL Division 1
- MPFL Division 2
- Malaysia Premier Futsal League (Women)
- Malaysia Futsal Cup
- Malaysia Futsal Cup (Women)

== Principals ==
Office-holders
Office	Name	Tenure
President	Sir Andrew Caldecott	1932–1933
President	M.B. Shelley	
President	J.S. Webster	
President	S.D. Scott	
President	R. Williamson	
President	Adrian Clark	1938–1940
President	J.E. King	1947–1948
President	H.P. Byson	1948–1949
President	C. Rawson	1949–1951
President	Tunku Abdul Rahman	1958–1974
President	Abdul Razak Hussein	1975–1976
President	Hamzah Abu Samah	1976–1983
President	Ahmad Shah of Pahang	1984–2014
President	Abdullah of Pahang	2014–2017
President	Tunku Ismail Idris	2017–2018
President	Hamidin Mohd Amin	2018–2025
President	Mohd Joehari Mohd Ayub	2025
President	Dato’ Ab Ghani Bin Hassan	2026–

Office-holders
Office	Name	Tenure
General Secretary	A.R. Singham	1941
General Secretary	Kwok Kin Keng	1948–1979
General Secretary	T.P. Murugasu	1980–1987
General Secretary	Paul Mony Samuel	1988–2000
General Secretary	Dell Akbar Khan	2000-2005
General Secretary	Ibrahim Saad	2005–2007
General Secretary	Azzuddin Ahmad	2007–2013
General Secretary	Hamidin Mohd Amin	2013–2018
General Secretary	Stuart Ramalingam	2018–2021
General Secretary	Mohd Saifuddin Abu Bakar	2021–2024
General Secretary	Noor Azman Hj Rahman	2025–2029

Name	Position	Source
(Malaysia) Mohd Yusoff Mahadi	Acting President	
(Malaysia) S Sivasundaram	Vice President	
(Malaysia) Rosmadi Ismail	2nd Vice President	
(Malaysia) Mohd Azhar Jamaluddin	3rd Vice President	
(Malaysia) Dollah Salleh	4th Vice President	
(Malaysia) Saaran Nadarajah	5th Vice President	
(Malaysia) Noor Azman Hj Rahman	General Secretary	
(Malaysia) Ismail Karim	Treasurer	
(Australia) Scott O'Donell	Advisor & Agent	
(Malaysia) Tan Cheng Hoe	Technical Director	
(Australia) Peter Cklamovski	Team Coach (Men's)	
(Brazil) Joel Cornelli	Team Coach (Women's)	
(Malaysia) Hishamuddin Abdul Karim	Media/Communications Manager	
(Malaysia) P Sentikumar	Futsal Coordinator	
(Malaysia) Kassim Kadir Bacha	Referee Coordinator	

== Management ==
February 2025 Source

=== Executive committee ===
- President: Mohd Joehari Mohd Ayub
- Deputy President: Yusoff Mahadi, S. Sivasundaram
- Vice-president: Rosmadi Ismail, Mohd Azhar Jamaluddin, Dollah Salleh, Saaran Nadarajah
- Other members: Zainal Abidin Hassan, Hishamuddin Abdul Karim, Mohd Hisamudin Yahaya, Mohd Azizudin Mohd Shariff, Tang Chee Hong, Kamarudin Hassan, Mohd Yusri Hassan Basri, Sugumaran Parthasarathy

=== FAM Judiciary ===
Disciplinary

- Chairman: Baljit Singh Sidhu
- Deputy chairman: Abd Shukor Ahmad

Appeals

- Chairman: Mohd Mokhtar Mohd Shariff
- Deputy chairman: Sheikh Mohd Nasir Sheikh Mohd Sharif

=== Club licencing ===
First Instance Body

- Chairman: Sheikh Mohd Nasir Sheikh Mohd Sharif

Appeals Body

- Chairman: Wirdawati Mohd Radzi

=== Treasurer ===
- Chairman: Ismail Karim

=== National teams ===
- Chairman: Mohd Joehari Mohd Ayub

Malaysia national football team

- Manager: Peter Cklamovski

Malaysia national under-23 football team

- Manager:Nafuzi Zain

Malaysia national under-22 football team

- Manager: Nafuzi Zain

Malaysia national under-19 football team

- Manager: Juan Torres Garrido

Malaysia national under-16 football team

- Manager: Javier Jorda Ribera

Malaysia women's national football team

- Manager: Joel Cornelli

Malaysia national futsal team

- Manager: Rakphol Sainetngam

Malaysia women's national futsal team

- Manager: Chiew Chun Yong

== Document forgery controversy ==
The FIFA Disciplinary Committee has imposed sanctions on the Football Association of Malaysia (FAM) and seven players – Gabriel Felipe Arrocha, Facundo Tomás Garcés, Rodrigo Julián Holgado, Imanol Javier Machuca, João Vitor Brandão Figueiredo, Jon Irazábal Iraurgui and Hector Alejandro Hevel Serrano – for breaches of article 22 of the FIFA Disciplinary Code (FDC) concerning forgery and falsification.

The FAM had submitted eligibility enquiries to FIFA, and in doing so, it allegedly used doctored documentation to be able to field the above players. FAM appealed the sanction on 15 October 2025.

All seven players played for Malaysia against Vietnam in the third round of qualifiers for the 2027 AFC Asian Cup on 10 June 2025.

== See also ==
- Malaysia national under-23 football team
- Malaysia national under-22 football team
- Malaysia national under-19 football team
- Malaysia national under-16 football team
- National Football Development Programme of Malaysia
- Malaysian football league system
- List of Malaysia football champions
- List of football clubs in Malaysia
- Malaysia national football team honours
- Malaysia national beach soccer team
