= 2023 PDRM FC season =

Polis Di-Raja Malaysia
2023 season
- President: Acryl Sani
- CEO: Hafiz Zainal Abidin
- Head coach: Azzmi Aziz
- Stadium: Petaling Jaya Stadium
- Malaysia Super League: 8th
- Malaysia FA Cup: Second round
- Malaysia Cup: Round of 16
- MFL Challenge Cup: Winners
- Top goalscorer: League: Bruno Suzuki (10); All: Bruno Suzuki (11)
Home colours	Away colours	Third colours

The 2023 season was Polis Di-Raja Malaysia Football Club's's 33rd season in the football club's history and 1st season in the top flight of Malaysian football, Malaysia Super League since promoted last season. The club also will participate in this season's edition of the Malaysia FA Cup, the Malaysia Cup and the MFL Challenge Cup.

== Coaching staff ==
- Head coach: Azzmi Aziz
- Assistant head coach: Eddy Gapil@Edwin
- Assistant coach:Al Madi Jumari
- Goalkeeper coach: Atfan Had
- Fitness coach: Nizan Ariffin

== Players ==
=== First-team squad ===
As of 12 January 2023

Note: Flags indicate national team as defined under FIFA eligibility rules; some limited exceptions apply. Players may hold more than one non-FIFA nationality.

No.	Pos.	Nation	Player
1	GK	MAS	Aqil Razak
3	DF	MAS	Azmi Muslim (captain)
4	MF	MAS	Aliff Najmi Shaaini
5	DF	MAS	Norfiqrie Talib
6	MF	MYA	Kyaw Min Oo
7	MF	MAS	Alifh Aiman
8	MF	MAS	Shyamierul Razmee
9	FW	JPN	Bruno Suzuki
10	MF	LBR	Marcus Macauley
11	FW	MAS	Dzulfahmi Abdul Hadi
12	DF	MAS	Izaffiq Ruzi
13	MF	MAS	Fauzi Majid
14	FW	GHA	Jacque Faye
15	FW	MAS	Afiq Saluddin
16	FW	MAS	Shazrin Abu Samah
17	FW	MAS	Amirul Wa'ie
19	DF	MAS	Amir Saiful
20	FW	MAS	Arif Anwar

No.	Pos.	Nation	Player
21	FW	NGA	Uche Agba
22	DF	NGA	James Okwuosa
23	MF	MAS	Zazrir Naim
24	MF	MAS	Alif Najmi Ahmad
26	DF	MAS	Alif Naquiddin
27	MF	MAS	Eskandar Ismail
29	DF	MAS	Izaaq Izhan
30	FW	MAS	Nabil Latpi
31	MF	MAS	Zulkhairi Mohd
32	MF	MAS	Safiee Ahmad
33	DF	MAS	Iqmal Harun
53	GK	MAS	Willfred Jabun
77	MF	JOR	Fadi Awad
80	GK	MAS	Ramadhan Hamid
88	FW	MAS	Arif Anwar
89	MF	MAS	Fakhrul Azim
—	FW	MAS	Ismail Ibrahim

=== Transfers in ===
Note: Flags indicate national team as defined under FIFA eligibility rules; some limited exceptions apply. Players may hold more than one non-FIFA nationality.

No.	Pos.	Nation	Player
1	GK	MAS	Aqil Razak
3	DF	MAS	Azmi Muslim (from Penang, previously on loan)
6	MF	MYA	Kyaw Min Oo (from (Myanmar) Yangon United)
7	MF	MAS	Alifh Aiman (from Kelantan)
8	MF	MAS	Shyamierul Razmee (from Kelantan)
9	FW	JPN	Bruno Suzuki (from (Thailand) Bangkok)
10	MF	LBR	Marcus Macauley (from (Jordan) Moghayer Al-Sarhan)
11	FW	MAS	Dzulfahmi Abdul Hadi (from Kelantan)
12	DF	MAS	Izaffiq Ruzi (from Negeri Sembilan)
13	MF	MAS	Fauzi Majid
15	DF	MAS	Aliff Najmi (from Kelantan United)
16	FW	MAS	Shazrin Abu Samah
21	FW	NGA	Uche Agba (from Sarawak United)
22	DF	NGA	James Okwuosa (from (Kuwait) Al Shabab)
24	MF	MAS	Alif Najmi
29	DF	MAS	Izaaq Izhan (from UiTM FC)
33	DF	MAS	Iqmal Harun
53	GK	MAS	Willfred Jabun
80	GK	MAS	Ramadhan Hamid (from UiTM FC)
88	FW	MAS	Arif Anwar (from Terengganu)

=== Transfers out ===
Note: Flags indicate national team as defined under FIFA eligibility rules; some limited exceptions apply. Players may hold more than one non-FIFA nationality.

No.	Pos.	Nation	Player
1	GK	MAS	Julian Bechler
5	DF	MAS	Che Mohamad Safwan
6	MF	MAS	Saiful Hasnol
8	MF	GHA	Alexander Amponsah
11	MF	SVK	Martin Adamec
13	MF	MAS	Durrkeswan Ganasan
16	FW	MAS	Syafiq Azmi
18	MF	MAS	Mu'az Zainal Abidin
24	MF	MAS	Sachin Samuel
25	DF	MAS	Amier Ali
28	MF	MAS	Azrie Reza
33	GK	MAS	Asri Muhamad
35	GK	MAS	Firdaus Irman
88	MF	MAS	Ammar Akhmal
91	FW	SVK	Miloš Lačný

== Competitions ==
=== Overview ===
Competition	First match	Last match	Starting round	Final position	Record							
Competition	First match	Last match	Starting round	Final position	Pld	W	D	L	GF	GA	GD	Win %
Malaysia Super League	25 February 2023	17 December 2023	Matchday 1	8th	26	11	4	11	35	37	−2	42.31
Malaysia FA Cup	14 April 2023	14 April 2023	Round of 16	Round of 16	1	0	0	1	0	3	−3	0.00
Malaysia Cup	3 August 2023	19 August 2023	Round of 16	Round of 16	2	1	0	1	3	5	−2	50.00
MFL Challenge Cup	18 September 2023	3 December 2023	Quarter-finals	Winner	6	5	1	0	13	4	+9	83.33
Total					35	17	5	13	51	49	+2	48.57

Last updated: 17 December 2023
Source: Competitions

=== Malaysia Super League ===
25 February 2023 1	Sabah	4–0	PDRM	Kota Kinabalu
19:30 UTC+8	Saddil 13', 71'; Park 37'; Wilkin 90+3'	Report		Stadium: Likas Stadium; Attendance: 12,602; Referee: Muhammad Usaid bin Jamal; Man of the Match: Park Tae-Soo (Sabah)

28 February 2023 2	PDRM	0–0	Perak	Petaling Jaya
21:00 UTC+8	Norfiqrie (yellow card) 27'; Amir (yellow card) 32'; Dzulfahmi (yellow card) 38'; Suzuki (yellow card) 86'	Report	Shafizi (yellow card) 86'	Stadium: Petaling Jaya Stadium; Attendance: 2,250; Referee: Firdaus Dahlan

4 March 2023 3	Kedah Darul Aman	0–1	PDRM	Alor Setar
21:00 UTC+8	Ott (red card) 58'; Ariff (yellow card) 79'; Fayadh (yellow card) 83'; Fadzrul (yellow card) 90+2'	Report	Safiee (yellow card) 58'; Fadi (yellow card) 72'; Suzuki 75'; Arif (yellow card) 83'; Norfiqrie (yellow card) 90+3'	Stadium: Darul Aman Stadium; Attendance: 12,792; Referee: Mohd Azizan Saat Ariffin

11 March 2023 4	Terengganu	1–0	PDRM	Kuala Terengganu
21:00 UTC+8	Kulmatov (yellow card) 41', (goal) 76'; Alif (yellow card) 45+1'; Haroon (yellow card) 56'	Report	Dzulfahmi (yellow card) 16'; Ramadhan (red card) 45+2'; Amir (yellow card) 57'; Izaaq (yellow card) 80'	Stadium: Sultan Mizan Zainal Abidin Stadium; Attendance: 9,020; Referee: Jeevanathan M. Ponniamoorthy

18 March 2023 5	PDRM	2–0	Kelantan United	Petaling Jaya
17:30 UTC+8	Dzulfahmi 10'; Okwuosa (yellow card) 27'; Agba 38' (pen.)	Report	Asyraaf (yellow card) 37'; Fandi (yellow card) 58'; Aqil (yellow card) 90'	Stadium: Petaling Jaya Stadium; Attendance: 202; Referee: Suhaizi Shukri

1 April 2023 6	Kuching City	0–1	PDRM	Kuching
21:15 UTC+8	Dzulazlan (yellow card) 35'; Amirul (yellow card) 83'	Report	Safiee (yellow card) 29'; Norfiqrie (yellow card) 55'; Suzuki 73'; Aliff (yellow card) 81'; Willfred (yellow card) 83'	Stadium: Sarawak State Stadium; Attendance: 292; Referee: Mohd Syukri Azeman

5 April 2023 7	PDRM	1–2	Sri Pahang	Petaling Jaya
22:00 UTC+08:00	Amir (yellow card) 5'; Okwuosa 76'	Report	Baqiuddin 18'; Sherman 22', (yellow card) 47'; Azam (yellow card) 36'	Stadium: Petaling Jaya Stadium; Attendance: 471; Referee: Tuan Mohd Yaasin Tuan Mohd Hanafiah

9 April 2023 8	Penang	4–2	PDRM	Penang
22:00 UTC+08:00	Okwuosa 11' (o.g.); Saad 17', 69'; Hadin (yellow card) 45+1'; Nik Akif (yellow card) 53'; Rahmat 90+3'	Report	Macauley 3', (yellow card) 20'; Awad (yellow card) 23' (yellow-red card) 40'; Azmi 28'; Norfiqrie (yellow card) 83'	Stadium: City Stadium; Attendance: 1,224; Referee: Mohd Nafeez Abd Wahab

Pos	Team	Pld	W	D	L	GF	GA	GD	Pts	Qualification or relegation
6	Terengganu	26	11	7	8	45	34	+11	40	Qualification for the AFF Shopee Cup group stage (Note: Qualified as the 2023 Malaysia Cup & 2023 Malaysia FA Cup runner-up.)
7	Kuala Lumpur City	26	10	8	8	44	39	+5	38	Qualification for the AFF Shopee Cup group stage
8	PDRM	26	11	4	11	35	37	−2	37	
9	Negeri Sembilan	26	6	9	11	33	49	−16	27	
10	Penang	26	6	6	14	29	50	−21	24	

Source: MFL
Rules for classification: 1) Points; 2) Goal difference; 3) Number of goals scored.

=== Malaysia FA Cup ===
14 April 2023 Second round	Johor Darul Ta'zim	3–0	PDRM	Iskandar Puteri
22:00 UTC+08:00		Report		Stadium: Sultan Ibrahim Stadium

== Statistics ==
=== Appearances and goals ===
No.	Pos	Nat	Player	Total		League		FA Cup		Malaysia Cup		MFL Challenge Cup	
No.	Pos	Nat	Player	Apps	Goals	Apps	Goals	Apps	Goals	Apps	Goals	Apps	Goals
Goalkeepers
1	GK	(Malaysia) MAS	Aqil Razak	5	0	3	0	1	0	0	0	1	0
35	GK	(Malaysia) MAS	Nor Hakeem Hamidun	5	0	4+1	0	0	0	0	0	0	0
53	GK	(Malaysia) MAS	Willfred Jabun	6	0	4+2	0	0	0	0	0	0	0
80	GK	(Malaysia) MAS	Ramadhan Hamid	22	0	15	0	0	0	2	0	5	0
Defenders
3	DF	(Malaysia) MAS	Azmi Muslim	10	1	7+2	1	1	0	0	0	0	0
5	DF	(Malaysia) MAS	Norfiqrie Talib	17	0	13+2	0	1	0	1	0	0	0
12	DF	(Malaysia) MAS	Izaffiq Ruzi	4	0	0+1	0	0	0	0	0	1+2	0
19	DF	(Malaysia) MAS	Amir Saiful	30	2	22	0	1	0	2	0	5	2
22	DF	(Nigeria) NGA	James Okwuosa	33	4	24	3	1	0	2	0	6	1
26	DF	(Malaysia) MAS	Alif Naquiddin	24	0	11+6	0	0	0	1+1	0	5	0
29	DF	(Malaysia) MAS	Izaaq Izhan	15	1	4+7	1	1	0	0	0	1+2	0
Midfielders
4	MF	(Malaysia) MAS	Aliff Najmi Shaaini	19	0	13	0	0	0	2	0	3+1	0
6	MF	(Myanmar) MYA	Kyaw Min Oo	25	1	18+1	1	0	0	2	0	3+1	0
7	MF	(Malaysia) MAS	Alifh Aiman	10	0	2+8	0	0	0	0	0	0	0
8	MF	(Spain) ESP	Mario Arqués	5	0	1+1	0	0	0	1	0	1+1	0
10	MF	(Liberia) LBR	Marcus Macauley	30	3	22	3	1	0	1+1	0	5	0
11	MF	(Malaysia) MAS	Dzulfahmi Abdul Hadi	26	2	18+3	2	0	0	0+1	0	0+4	0
13	MF	(Malaysia) MAS	Fauzi Abd Majid	4	0	0+1	0	0	0	0	0	0+3	0
16	MF	(Malaysia) MAS	Shazrin Abu Samah	1	0	0	0	0	0	0	0	0+1	0
23	MF	(Malaysia) MAS	Zazrir Naim	4	0	0+3	0	0	0	0	0	1	0
32	MF	(Malaysia) MAS	Safiee Ahmad	31	0	19+3	0	1	0	1+1	0	5+1	0
33	MF	(Malaysia) MAS	Nur Iqmal Harun	4	1	3	1	0	0	0	0	1	0
67	MF	(Malaysia) MAS	Amirul Hakim	1	0	0+1	0	0	0	0	0	0	0
77	MF	(Jordan) JOR	Fadi Awad	30	2	21	2	1	0	2	0	6	0
89	MF	(Malaysia) MAS	Fakhrul Azim	30	2	10+11	0	1	0	1+1	0	4+2	2
Forwards
9	FW	(Japan) JPN	Bruno Suzuki	34	11	15+11	10	1	0	1+1	0	1+4	1
14	FW	(Ghana) GHA	Jacque Faye	10	0	5+5	0	0	0	0	0	0	0
17	FW	(Malaysia) MAS	Amirul Wa'ie	15	1	0+12	1	0+1	0	0	0	0+2	0
18	FW	(Malaysia) MAS	Hadi Fayyadh	17	1	3+6	0	0	0	1+1	1	0+6	0
20	FW	(Malaysia) MAS	Arif Anwar	9	0	2+5	0	0	0	0+2	0	0	0
21	FW	(Nigeria) NGA	Uche Agba	26	10	12+7	5	0+1	0	1	0	5	5
28	FW	(Nigeria) NGA	Chukwu Chijioke	2	0	2	0	0	0	0	0	0	0
30	FW	(Malaysia) MAS	Nabil Latpi	27	7	11+8	4	0	0	1+1	1	6	2
Players transferred out during the season

Last updated: 3 December 2023
Source: Competitions
