= 2026–27 Malaysia A2 Amateur League =

Malaysian football season

Malaysia A2 Amateur League
- Dates: 14 November 2026 – 24 April 2027
- Matches: 6
- Goals: 17 (2.83 per match)
- Biggest home win: 3 goals MPPD FC 3–1 Melaka U-20 (15 November 2026)
- Biggest away win: 3 goals Star City U-20 2–3 Kuala Perlis Titans (14 November 2026)
- Highest scoring: 5 goals Star City U-20 2–3 Kuala Perlis Titans (14 November 2026)
- All statistics correct as of 15 November 2026.

The 2026–27 Malaysia A2 Amateur League (Malay: Liga Amatur A2 Malaysia), formerly known as the Malaysia M4 League and Al-Ikhsan Cup for sponsorship reasons, is the fifth season of the Malaysia A2 Amateur League, the third tier football league of the Malaysian football league system.

AZM Rovers F.C. were the defending champions, but will not defend the title as they declined the participation.

== Competition format ==
The tournament is played as follows:

- League level: 18 teams are divided into Zone 1 (4 teams), Zone 2 (5 teams), Zone 3 (5 teams) and Zone 4 (4 teams), from the north, central, south, and east coast regions.
  - Round 1: Divided into four zones, each team will play at home and away to determine the position in the group. The top two teams in each zone, will advance to the knockout stage.
- Knockout stage: The knockout stage is the match to determine the winner. Finalists will be promoted to the 2027–28 Malaysia A1 Semi-Pro League.

== Team changes ==
The following teams have changed division since the 2026–27 season.

=== To A2 Amateur League ===
Ejected from the Malaysia Super League

- (Malaysia) PDRM

Relegated from the Malaysia A1 Semi-Pro League

- ~~Kedah Darul Aman~~

Promoted from the Malaysia A3 Community League

- MP Port Dickson – Negeri Sembilan Premier League finalist
- Seremban United – Negeri Sembilan Premier League quarter-finalist
- STW Jelai– Pahang Amateur League quarter-finalist

Invited teams

- (Kuala Lumpur) CCCP-KDN
- (Johor) JDT Academy
- (Penang) Kg. Rawa-Butterworth Rangers
- (Malacca) Melaka U-20
- Perak FA II
- Syarikat Air Terengganu
- (Kedah) Star City U-20

=== From A2 Amateur League ===
Promoted to the A1 Semi-Pro League

- (Penang) USM
- (Selangor) AAK-Unisel

Teams withdrawn

- (Kelantan) AZM Rovers^{^{1}}
- Kedah Darul Aman^{^{2}}
- (Kedah) Kubang Pasu-MPKB
- (Kedah) Kuala Muda
- Kuala Lumpur Rangers
- Kuala Lumpur Rovers
- (Malacca) MBMB Warriors
- (Malacca) Duyong Fighters
- (Pahang) Kuantan City
- (Perlis) Bintong
- (Selangor) UiTM United
- (Perlis) Juang Titan Kayang^{^{3}}
- (Selangor) Obi & Friends^{^{3}}
- (Selangor) MARS^{^{3}}
- (Putrajaya) HE Clinic^{^{3}}
- (Pahang) Gelora Old Boys^{^{3}}

=== Name changes ===
- (Negeri Sembilan) Seremban United merged with PUSEN Hornet become PUSEN-Seremban United.
- (Pahang) STW Jelai merged with Raub become Raub-STW.

Notes:

^1 Not participate in the 2026-27 Malaysia A2 Amateur League competition
^2 Withdrew
^3 Originally were promoted to the 2026–27 Malaysia A2 Amateur League by winning their respective leagues; however, the teams were not registered due to unknown reasons.

== Draw ==
North (Zone 1) Teams (Penang) Kg.Rawa-Butterworth Rangers Kuala Perlis Titans Perak FA II (Kedah) Star City U-20	Central (Zone 2) Teams (Putrajaya) ACeIO (Kuala Lumpur) CCCP-KDN (Johor) JDT Academy (Kuala Lumpur) Kampong Ku (Selangor) Sungai Merab	South (Zone 3) Teams (Malacca) Melaka U-20 (Negeri Sembilan) MPPD FC (Negeri Sembilan) NS Forces Warriors (Negeri Sembilan) PUSEN-Seremban United (Negeri Sembilan) TH-KR FC	East Coast (Zone 4) Teams (Malaysia) PDRM (Pahang) Raub-STW (Pahang) YPM FC Syarikat Air Terengganu FC

== Stadiums and locations ==
Team	Location	Stadium	Capacity
(Putrajaya) ACeIO	Putrajaya	UPM Stadium, Seri Kembangan	2,000
(Kuala Lumpur) CCCP-KDN	Setapak	Kuala Lumpur Sports Arena	1,000
(Johor) JDT Academy	Larkin, Johor	Tan Sri Dato' Haji Hassan Yunos Stadium	30,000
(Kuala Lumpur) Kampong Ku	Kampung Baru, Kuala Lumpur	HKL Football field	500
(Penang) Kg.Rawa-Butterworth Rangers	Batu Kawan	Penang State Stadium	40,000
Kuala Perlis Titans	Kuala Perlis	Tuanku Syed Putra Stadium, Kangar	20,000
(Malacca) Melaka U-20	Melaka City	Tun Fatimah Stadium, Semabok	1,000
(Negeri Sembilan) MPPD FC	Port Dickson	Padang Merdeka Stadium	1,000
(Negeri Sembilan) NS Forces Warriors	Nilai	Seriemas SportsPlex	500
(Malaysia) PDRM	Kuala Lumpur	PULAPOL Football field	500
Perak FA II	Chemor	Chepor SSI Mini Stadium, Perak Football Complex	1,000
(Negeri Sembilan) PUSEN-Seremban United	Bandar Sri Sendayan	IRC Arena	500
(Pahang) Raub-STW	Raub, Pahang	Raub District Council Sports Complex Field	1,000
Syarikat Air Terengganu FC	Kuala Terengganu	UniSZA Stadium	1,000
(Kedah) Star City U-20	Sintok	UUM Stadium	5,000
(Selangor) Sungai Merab	Sepang	Sepang Municipal Council Stadium	1,000
(Negeri Sembilan) TH-KR FC	Seremban	PBNS BubblesO2 Arena	500
(Pahang) YPM FC	Kuantan	SSMP Mini Stadium, Gambang	1,000

=== Locations ===
Locations of teams in the 2026–27 Malaysia A2 Amateur League
Blue: Zone 1; Red: Zone 2; Green: Zone 3; Yellow: Zone 4;
Klang Valley (Central Zone)

== Personnel, kits and sponsoring ==
Team	Head coach	Captain	Kit manufacturer	Kit sponsors	
Team	Head coach	Captain	Kit manufacturer	Main	Other(s)
(Kuala Lumpur) ACEIO	(Malaysia) Omar Salim	(Malaysia) Mohd Shahrul Ramli			List: Front: Back: Sleeves: Shorts:
(Kuala Lumpur) CCCP-KDN	(Malaysia) Anuar bin Udin	(Malaysia)			List: Front: Back: Sleeves: Shorts:
(Johor) JDT Academy	(Malaysia) Shariman Che Omar	(Malaysia) Ahmad Aysar Hadi	(United States) Nike	JMYR Stablecoin	List: Front: None; Back: Toyota; Sleeves: JCORP; Shorts: None
(Penang) Kg.Rawa-Butterworth Rangers	(Malaysia) Zabidi Othman	(Malaysia) Mohd Syukur Saidin	(Malaysia) ActiveKAK	KVMK	List: Front: Back: Sleeves: Shorts:
(Kuala Lumpur) Kampong Ku	(Malaysia) Hamdan Ibrahim	(Malaysia) Azrul Razman	(Malaysia) UMU Jersey	MZST KgKuFC Forever	List: Front: Back: Sleeves: Shorts:
Kuala Perlis Titans	(Malaysia) Mohd Annif bin Mat Aman	(Malaysia) Yusmal Daniel Hakim	(Malaysia) Beast Sport My	ICENTS	List: Front: Back: Sleeves: Shorts:
(Malacca) Melaka U-20	(Malaysia) Mohd Fahmi bin Abu	(Malaysia) Fazri Harith Fitri	(Malaysia) Qalb Zahara	Qalb Zahara	List: Front: None; Back: None; Sleeves: None; Shorts: None
(Negeri Sembilan) MPPD FC	(Malaysia) Khairul Anuar Baharom	(Malaysia) Bukhari Idris	(Malaysia) Alpha Sports		List: Front: Back: Sleeves: Shorts:
(Negeri Sembilan) NS Forces Warriors	(Malaysia) Hafizal Abu Hassan	(Malaysia) Noraiman Talib	(Malaysia) KimiCom Jersey	Ayam Rempah JANK	List: Front: Back: KimiCom Jersey; Sleeves: Shorts:
(Malaysia) PDRM	(Malaysia) Mohd Asyraf M. R. Asri	(Malaysia) Fakhrullah Yusoff	(Malaysia) Line Seven		List: Front: Back: Sleeves: Shorts:
Perak FA II	(Malaysia) Syamsul Saad	(Malaysia) Ammar Batisha	(Malaysia) AL Sports	Perak Sejahtera 2030	List: Front: Perbadanan Setiausaha Kerajaan Negeri Perak, MB Inc.; Back: Darul Ridzuan Integrity Champion, Al-Ikhsan Sports; Sleeves: Lembaga Air Perak, Perbadanan Pertanian Negeri Perak; Shorts:
(Negeri Sembilan) PUSEN-Seremban United	(Malaysia) Kaharuddin Rahman	(Malaysia) Ahmad Syafiq Nasaruddin	(Malaysia) KimiCom Jersey	Zenith	List: Front: Back: Sleeves: Shorts:
(Pahang) Raub	(Malaysia) Izzudin Danuri	(Malaysia) Amin Mozri	(Malaysia) PUC Sports	RMN (Ramli Mohd Nor)	List: Front: Back: Sleeves: Shorts:
Syarikat Air Terengganu FC	(Malaysia) Norhisham Hassan	(Malaysia) Norazman A Bakar	(Malaysia) Trivet		List: Front: Back: Sleeves: Shorts:
(Selangor) Sungai Merab	(Malaysia) Azman Bin Jaafar	(Malaysia) Halim Che Hassan	(Malaysia) Made by club		List: Front: Back: Sleeves: Shorts:
(Kedah) Star City U-20	(Malaysia) Maizal Hairi bin Marzuki	(Malaysia) Hafizul Akbar	(Malaysia) StarSports	AirAsia	List: Front: None; Back: FIVE Petroleum; Sleeves: None; Shorts: None
(Negeri Sembilan) TH-KR FC	(Malaysia) Haswanis bin Che Hassan	(Malaysia) Fakrul Aiman	(Malaysia) D’Mensi Legacy		List: Front: Back: Sleeves: Shorts:
(Pahang) YPM FC	(Malaysia) Syed Farul Hakim	(Malaysia) Syawal Norsam	(Malaysia) MHT Sublimation	YP Maintenance Sdn. Bhd.	List: Front: Back: Sleeves: Tok Gajah Forever; Shorts:

== Standings ==
=== Zone 1 (North) ===
Pos	Team	Pld	W	D	L	GF	GA	GD	Pts	Promotion or qualification	PRK	BUT	KPT	STA
1	Perak FA II	2	1	1	0	6	4	+2	4	Advance to knockout round		–	–	4–2
2	Kg.Rawa-Butterworth Rangers	2	1	1	0	4	3	+1	4	Advance to knockout round	2–2		–	–
3	Kuala Perlis Titans	2	1	0	1	4	4	0	3		–	1–2		–
4	Star City U-20	2	0	0	2	4	7	−3	0		–	–	2–3	

Updated to match(es) played on 21 November 2026. Source: FAM-CMS
Legend: Blue = home team win; Yellow = draw; Red = away team win.
Rules for classification: 1) Points; 2) Goal difference; 3) Number of goals scored.

=== Zone 2 (Central) ===
Pos	Team	Pld	W	D	L	GF	GA	GD	Pts	Promotion or qualification	ACE	JDT	CHE	SGM	KGK
1	ACEIO	2	2	0	0	4	2	+2	6	Advance to knockout round		–	–	3–2	–
2	JDT Academy	2	1	0	1	3	1	+2	3	Advance to knockout round	0–1		–	–	3–0
3	CCCP-KDN	0	0	0	0	0	0	0	0		–	–		–	–
4	Sungai Merab	1	0	0	1	2	3	−1	0		–	–	–		–
5	Kampong Ku	1	0	0	1	0	3	−3	0		–	–	–	–	

Updated to match(es) played on 21 November 2026. Source: FAM-CMS
Legend: Blue = home team win; Yellow = draw; Red = away team win.
Rules for classification: 1) Points; 2) Goal difference; 3) Number of goals scored.

=== Zone 3 (South) ===
Pos	Team	Pld	W	D	L	GF	GA	GD	Pts	Promotion or qualification	TEC	MPD	NSW	PUS	MEL
1	Teck Hin-KR	2	2	0	0	4	0	+4	6	Advance to knockout round		3–0	–	1–0	–
2	MPPD FC	2	1	0	1	3	4	−1	3	Advance to knockout round	–		–	–	3–1
3	NS Forces Warriors	0	0	0	0	0	0	0	0		–	–		–	–
4	PUSEN-Seremban United	1	0	0	1	0	1	−1	0		–	–	–		–
5	Melaka U-20	1	0	0	1	1	3	−2	0		–	–	–	–	

Updated to match(es) played on 21 November 2026. Source: FAM-CMS
Legend: Blue = home team win; Yellow = draw; Red = away team win.
Rules for classification: 1) Points; 2) Goal difference; 3) Number of goals scored.

=== Zone 4 (East Coast) ===
Pos	Team	Pld	W	D	L	GF	GA	GD	Pts	Promotion or qualification	SAT	POL	YPM	STW
1	SATU	2	0	2	0	2	2	0	2	Advance to knockout round		1–1	–	–
2	PDRM	1	0	1	0	1	1	0	1	Advance to knockout round	–		–	–
3	YPM FC	1	0	1	0	1	1	0	1		1–1	–		–
4	Raub-STW	0	0	0	0	0	0	0	0		–	–	–	

Updated to match(es) played on 21 November 2026. Source: FAM-CMS
Legend: Blue = home team win; Yellow = draw; Red = away team win.
Rules for classification: 1) Points; 2) Goal difference; 3) Number of goals scored.

== Knockout round ==
=== Bracket ===
Quarter-finals

Semi-finals

Final

== Season statistics ==
=== Top goalscorers ===
As of 14 November 2026

Rank	Player	Team	Goals
1	(Malaysia) Afiq Shazwan A. Amrun	Kuala Perlis Titans	1
1	(Malaysia) Hazwan Hassan	Kuala Perlis Titans	1
1	(Malaysia) Yusmal Daniel Hakim	Kuala Perlis Titans	1
1	(Malaysia) Adam Mukhriz Farizuan	Star City U20	1
1	(Malaysia) Syahmi Harith Abdullah	Star City U20	1
1	(Malaysia) Amir Firdaus Abdull Fatah	TH-KR FC	1

== See also ==
- 2026–27 Malaysia Super League
- 2026–27 Malaysia A1 Semi-Pro League
- 2026–27 Malaysia A3 Community League
