= SATU F.C. =

SATU
- Full name: Syarikat Air Terengganu Football Club
- Short name: SATU
- Founded: 2017; 9 years ago
- Stadium: UniSZA Mini Stadium
- Capacity: 500
- Owner: Syarikat Air Terengganu Sdn Bhd (SATU)
- Head coach: Mohd Norhisham bin Hassan
- League: Malaysia A2 Amateur League
- 2026–27: TBA

Syarikat Air Terengganu Football Club, commonly known as SATU FC, is a Malaysian football club based in Kuala Terengganu, Terengganu. Affiliated with Terengganu's state water utility operator, Syarikat Air Terengganu Sdn Bhd (SATU), the club competes in the Malaysia A2 Amateur League, the third tier of the Malaysian football league system.

== History ==
=== Origins and corporate structure ===
SATU FC was established under the Kelab Sukan dan Kebajikan Kakitangan SATU (SATU Staff Sports and Welfare Club), the internal sports and welfare body of Syarikat Air Terengganu Sdn Bhd. Originally formed to foster recreation and camaraderie among company personnel, the club evolved into a structured competitive football programme aimed at providing Terengganu players with a pathway to continue playing competitive football alongside employment opportunities.

=== State competitions and promotion to Liga A2 ===
Competing within Terengganu's domestic circuit, SATU FC participated in the 2026 Kuala Terengganu League (KTL), a community league sanctioned under the local football structure. Led by team manager Khalid Omar and head coach Rashidi Diniey, SATU FC advanced to the quarter-finals of the 2026 KTL.

Following the conclusion of the 2026 state season, SATU FC secured Terengganu's qualifying slot to the Malaysia A2 Amateur League, organized by the Amateur Football League (AFL). Placed in the East Coast Zone alongside teams such as PDRM FA, Raub-STW and YPM FC, SATU FC became Terengganu's sole representative in the national third-tier competition.

== Relationship with Terengganu FC ==
While SATU operates independently as a corporate team in the lower tiers of Malaysian football, its parent company Syarikat Air Terengganu Sdn Bhd (a subsidiary of Terengganu Incorporated), has served as a recurring official sponsor of the state's flagship professional club Terengganu F.C. in the Malaysia Super League.

== Players ==
=== Current squad ===
As of 13 November 2026

Note: Flags indicate national team as defined under FIFA eligibility rules; some limited exceptions apply. Players may hold more than one non-FIFA nationality.

No.	Pos.	Nation	Player
1	GK	MAS	Shafawi Mohamad (captain)
2	DF	MAS	Khairul Nizam Mohammad
3	DF	MAS	Fakrul Ilahi Muhammad
4	DF	MAS	Baharuddin Mohd Yusoff
5	DF	MAS	Rozaini Abu Bakar
6	DF	MAS	Ahmad Fikrie Zaid
7	FW	MAS	Izzul Fadhli Fauzi
8	DF	MAS	Ahmad Sufian Syamsul Rizal
9	MF	MAS	Aliff Hakimie Nik Soh
10	FW	MAS	Daniel Syafiq Mohamad
11	MF	MAS	Fakhrurazi Musa
12	MF	MAS	Hazim Mohammad Padzli
13	MF	MAS	Ahmad Kamal Imran Ramlan
14	DF	MAS	Hadi Al Hafiq Ahmad Shakri

No.	Pos.	Nation	Player
16	MF	MAS	Che Ku Ahmad Aliff
17	MF	MAS	Muhammad Naim Zawawi
18	DF	MAS	Syafiq Ikhwan Muthar
19	MF	MAS	Firdaus Rusdi
20	MF	MAS	Azri Syazani Zulkifli
21	MF	MAS	Mohd Hafizi Mohamad
22	GK	MAS	Fahiezad Ibrahim
25	FW	MAS	Wafiq Saiby
27	MF	MAS	Amirul Syazwan Nor Azmi
28	GK	MAS	Ahmad Hadin Azaha
29	DF	MAS	Ahmad Aiman Saaroni
30	FW	MAS	Zulkifli Sanusi
32	MF	MAS	Syawalruzaman Mohamad
34	DF	MAS	Norazman A. Bakar

== Management ==
Position	Name
Team manager	(Malaysia) Izzul Badri bin Muhamad
Head coach	(Malaysia) Mohd Norhisham bin Hassan
Assistant coach	(Malaysia) Mohd Zairi Hafiezi Idris
Goalkeeper coach	(Malaysia) Sharbinee Allawee
Fitness coach	(Malaysia) Shaiful Hamzi bin Salleh
Kitman	(Malaysia) Azizi Zakaria (Malaysia) Ahmad Rashidi Dinie bin Zulkifly
