= Melaka F.C. Under-20 =

Under-20 reserve and youth football team of Melaka F.C.

Melaka U-20
- Full name: Melaka Football Club Under-20
- Short name: MFC
- Founded: 2026; 0 years ago
- Ground: Tun Fatimah Stadium, Semabok
- Capacity: 1,000
- Chairman: Datuk Wira Nur Azmi Ahmad
- Head coach: Mohd Fahmi Abu
- League: Malaysia A2 Amateur League
- 2026–27: TBA
Home colours	Away colours

Melaka Football Club Under-20 (commonly referred to as Melaka FC U-20 or Melaka U-20) is the reserve and developmental football team of Malaysian professional club Melaka F.C. Based in Malacca City, Malacca. The team serves as the primary developmental bridge between state-level grassroots football and the senior squad competing in the Malaysia Super League.

In the 2026–27 season, the squad made its debut in the third tier of the Malaysian football league system, the Malaysia A2 Amateur League.

== History ==
=== Background and state youth legacy ===
Under-20 and under-21 football development in Malacca was spearheaded by the Melaka Football Association (MAFA) and the former Melaka United setup. Under the traditional state banner, Malacca's youth squad achieved notable national success by winning the Piala Presiden (President's Cup) twice, in 1990 and 1993.

Following the dissolution of Melaka United in late 2022, Melaka F.C. was established. The club restructured its youth pathway to align with Malaysian Football League (MFL) and Amateur Football League (AFL) development requirements.

=== 2026–27 Malaysia A2 Amateur League debut ===
In November 2026, the Amateur Football League confirmed that Melaka FC U-20 was among eight new teams admitted into the 2026–27 Malaysia A2 Amateur League, expanding the third-tier competition to 18 clubs nationwide. Entering the tournament to provide young players with competitive senior-level match experience, Melaka FC U-20 was placed in the South Zone (Zon Selatan) alongside four clubs from Negeri Sembilan: MPPD, NS Forces Warriors, PUSEN-Seremban United, and Teck Hin-KR.

== Stadium ==
While the senior Melaka FC side plays its home fixtures at the 40,000-capacity Hang Jebat Stadium in Krubong, the U-20 and development squads traditionally train and host home matches at the 15,000-capacity Hang Tuah Stadium in Malacca City, and Tun Fatimah Stadium in Semabok.

== Players ==
=== Current squad ===
As of 15 November 2026

Note: Flags indicate national team as defined under FIFA eligibility rules; some limited exceptions apply. Players may hold more than one non-FIFA nationality.

No.	Pos.	Nation	Player
1	GK	MAS	Sarhan Syafi Zaki
2	DF	MAS	Akmal Harith Rozaidi
3	DF	MAS	Fazri Harith Fitri (captain)
4	DF	MAS	Azib Firas Azlizan
5	DF	MAS	Ikhwan Shah Abdullah
6	MF	MAS	Amerfaris Mohamad Saidi
7	FW	MAS	Rizieq Rosman
8	MF	MAS	Aidel Norizan
9	FW	MAS	Aisy Marzuq Anuar
10	FW	MAS	Hilman Raiyan Mor
11	FW	MAS	Danish Farhan Mohd Faiz
12	DF	MAS	Amier Luqman Hazmad
13	DF	MAS	Nazmi Hilmi Hapizi

No.	Pos.	Nation	Player
14	MF	MAS	Sabiq Irfan Sahril
15	FW	MAS	Ahmad Danish Abadi
16	MF	MAS	Nor Zairy Zafran
17	FW	MAS	Faris Iskandar Saifudin
18	GK	MAS	Alieff Firdaus Azhar
19	MF	MAS	Muhammad Ikram Masyade
20	FW	MAS	Aliff Aqasha Sopie
21	DF	MAS	Akif Naufal Abd Shukor
22	GK	MAS	Haikal Mohd Hassan
23	MF	MAS	Ammar Mursyid Mohd Arif
24	DF	MAS	Nur Adam Abdullah
25	MF	MAS	Mikail Mohd Firdaus

== Management ==
Position	Name
Team manager	(Malaysia) Mohd Hafiz Abdul Karim
Head coach	(Malaysia) Mohd Fahmi Abu
Goalkeeper coach	(Malaysia) Azmir Ab. Aziz
Fitness coach	(Malaysia) Mohd Saiful Mustafa
Physio	(Malaysia) Muhammad Hafizullah Wahab
Team admin	(Malaysia) Akmar Hakim Mohd Rosly
Kitman	(Malaysia) Zulkeply Roslee

== See also ==
- Melaka F.C.
- Melaka Football Association
- Liga Melaka
- 2026–27 Malaysia A2 Amateur League
