= Asri =

Asri is a given name. Notable people with the name include:

- Asri Akbar (born 1984), Indonesian footballer
- Asri Aspar (born 1996), Bruneian footballer
- Asri Muda (1923–1992), Malaysian politician
- Asri Muhamad (born 1998), Malaysian footballer

== See also ==
- Danial Asri (born 2000), Malaysian footballer
- Mohd Asri Zainul Abidin (born 1971), Malaysian Islamic scholar
