= 2022 Malaysia M5 League =

Malaysia M5 League
- Season: 2022

The 2022 Malaysia M5 League (Malay: 2022 Liga M5 Malaysia) is the inaugural season of the League competition since its establishment in 2019. It is in the fifth tier of the Malaysia football league system. The league has several leagues registered under it.

== Teams ==
The table below shows the number of teams participating in the 5 zonal leagues and the number of slots allocated to each league for the Malaysia M4 League.

South Zone
| State/Community leagues | PT | PS | Winner | Promoted |
|---|---|---|---|---|
| (Negeri Sembilan) Nogori M5 League (League 1) | 24 | 2 | MPPD F.C. | MPPD F.C. Bunga Raya FC |
| (Negeri Sembilan) Nogori M5 League (League 2) | 14 | 1 | Harini FT II | NS Cyberfox F.C. |
| (Malacca) Melaka League (Division 1) | 14 | 1 | Tampoi F.C. | None |
| FA Johor | Not held | | | |

East Coast Zone
| State/Community leagues | PT | PS | Winner | Promoted |
|---|---|---|---|---|
| (Pahang) Kuantan Amateur League | 12 | 2 | YPM FC | YPM FC Cendawan FC |
| FA Kelantan | Not held | | | |
| FA Terengganu | Not held | | | |

North Zone
| State/Community leagues | PT | PS | Winner | Promoted |
|---|---|---|---|---|
| FA Perak | Not held | | | |
| FA Perlis | Not held | | | |
| FA Penang | Not held | | | |
| FA Kedah | Not held | | | |

Central Zone
| State/Community leagues | PT | PS | Winner | Promoted |
|---|---|---|---|---|
| (Selangor) A Ligue M5 Amisi Physio | 27 | 1 | OSV UK F.C. | None |
| (Selangor) Liga Mahsa-Kronos M5 | 10 | 2 | Republic of Borneo F.C. | Republic of Borneo F.C. MAHSA City |
| Kuala Lumpur League | 10 | 1 | PULAPOL F.C. | None |
| Putrajaya League | 12 | 1 | JAKIM FC | JAKIM FC |

Borneo Zone
| State/Community leagues | PT | PS | Winner | Promoted |
|---|---|---|---|---|
| (Sabah) Piala Dato Verdon Bahanda | 32 | 1 | GP F.C. | None |
| S Ligue M5 Sarawak | 14 | 1 | AS United F.C. | None |
| (Sarawak) Bintulu M5 League | 10 | 1 | SDP Project Park F.C. | Mukah Youth Team F.C. |

Notes:

- PT (participating teams): Total number of teams participating in each league
- PS (promotion slots): Number of slots allocated to each league for the Malaysia M4 League

== Central Zone ==
=== A Ligue M5 Amisi Physio ===
A Ligue M5 Amisi Physio
- Season: 2022
- Champions: OSV UK

==== Group A ====
| Pos | Team | Pld | W | D | L | GF | GA | GD | Pts | Qualification |
|---|---|---|---|---|---|---|---|---|---|---|
| 1 | Seri Gemilang Outlaw | 6 | 5 | 0 | 1 | 13 | 1 | +12 | 15 | Qualification to Round of 16 |
| 2 | Sky United | 6 | 4 | 1 | 1 | 15 | 3 | +12 | 13 | Qualification to Round of 16 |
| 3 | Salak United | 6 | 4 | 1 | 1 | 11 | 6 | +5 | 13 | Qualification to Round of 16 |
| 4 | Southern FC | 6 | 3 | 0 | 3 | 7 | 7 | 0 | 9 | Qualification to Round of 16 |
| 5 | Revon City | 6 | 1 | 3 | 2 | 6 | 9 | −3 | 6 | |
| 6 | Ichimon FC | 6 | 1 | 1 | 4 | 3 | 7 | −4 | 4 | |
| 7 | Bara FC | 6 | 0 | 0 | 6 | 1 | 21 | −20 | 0 | |

Source: A Ligue
Rules for classification: 1) Points; 2) Goal difference; 3) Number of goals scored.

==== Group B ====
| Pos | Team | Pld | W | D | L | GF | GA | GD | Pts | Qualification |
|---|---|---|---|---|---|---|---|---|---|---|
| 1 | Team Haq | 5 | 3 | 1 | 1 | 17 | 3 | +14 | 10 | Qualification to Round of 16 |
| 2 | Arslan FC | 5 | 3 | 1 | 1 | 9 | 5 | +4 | 10 | Qualification to Round of 16 |
| 3 | KVC FC | 5 | 3 | 1 | 1 | 9 | 6 | +3 | 10 | Qualification to Round of 16 |
| 4 | Mix Gen Knight | 5 | 2 | 2 | 1 | 8 | 4 | +4 | 8 | Qualification to Round of 16 |
| 5 | Jang's Bois | 5 | 1 | 1 | 3 | 11 | 5 | +6 | 4 | |
| 6 | Bega FC | 5 | 0 | 0 | 5 | 1 | 32 | −31 | 0 | |

Source: A Ligue
Rules for classification: 1) Points; 2) Goal difference; 3) Number of goals scored.

==== Group C ====
| Pos | Team | Pld | W | D | L | GF | GA | GD | Pts | Qualification |
|---|---|---|---|---|---|---|---|---|---|---|
| 1 | Maghreb FC | 7 | 6 | 0 | 1 | 26 | 8 | +18 | 18 | Qualification to Round of 16 |
| 2 | Ukay Positive | 7 | 5 | 1 | 1 | 18 | 5 | +13 | 16 | Qualification to Round of 16 |
| 3 | FC Cheras Road | 7 | 5 | 1 | 1 | 17 | 5 | +12 | 16 | Qualification to Round of 16 |
| 4 | OSV UK (C) | 7 | 4 | 1 | 2 | 27 | 9 | +18 | 13 | Qualification to Round of 16 |
| 5 | Three Lions FC | 7 | 3 | 1 | 3 | 8 | 11 | −3 | 10 | |
| 6 | Bukit Antarabangsa | 7 | 2 | 0 | 5 | 6 | 18 | −12 | 6 | |
| 7 | Alpha FC | 7 | 1 | 0 | 6 | 9 | 20 | −11 | 3 | |
| 8 | Dark Gladiator | 7 | 0 | 0 | 7 | 3 | 38 | −35 | 0 | |

Source: A Ligue
Rules for classification: 1) Points; 2) Goal difference; 3) Number of goals scored.
(C) Champions

==== Group D ====
| Pos | Team | Pld | W | D | L | GF | GA | GD | Pts | Qualification |
|---|---|---|---|---|---|---|---|---|---|---|
| 1 | GPS FC | 5 | 4 | 1 | 0 | 12 | 4 | +8 | 13 | Qualification to Round of 16 |
| 2 | Kickers FC | 5 | 3 | 0 | 2 | 13 | 6 | +7 | 9 | Qualification to Round of 16 |
| 3 | Shah Alam Rangers | 5 | 3 | 0 | 2 | 9 | 8 | +1 | 9 | Qualification to Round of 16 |
| 4 | KBLP U23 | 5 | 2 | 1 | 2 | 7 | 6 | +1 | 7 | Qualification to Round of 16 |
| 5 | Hydra FC | 5 | 2 | 0 | 3 | 9 | 9 | 0 | 6 | |
| 6 | Rose FC | 5 | 0 | 0 | 5 | 2 | 19 | −17 | 0 | |

Source: A Ligue
Rules for classification: 1) Points; 2) Goal difference; 3) Number of goals scored.

=== Play-off round ===
==== Bracket ====
Round of 16
1 | Seri Gemilang Outlaw | 0 | 3 | 3
16 | Mix Gen Knight FC | 2 | 1 | 3
8 | Sky United | 1 | 1 | 2
9 | KVC FC | 0 | 1 | 1
5 | FC Cheras Road | 2 | 5 | 7
12 | Kickers FC | 1 | 1 | 2
4 | OSV UK | 2 | 3 | 5
13 | GPS FC | 1 | 1 | 2
6 | Maghreb FC | 2 | 2 | 4
11 | KBLP U23 | 2 | 0 | 2
3 | Ukay Positive | 2 | 4 | 6
14 | Shah Alam Rangers | 1 | 1 | 2
7 | Salak Tinggi United | 1 | 0 | 1
10 | Arslan FC | 1 | 0 | 1
2 | Southern FC | 3 | 1 | 4
15 | Team Haq FC | 0 | 2 | 2

Quarter-final
Seri Gemilang Outlaw | 0 | 1 | 1
Sky United | 0 | 0 | 0
FC Cheras Road | 0 | 1 | 1
OSV FC | 2 | 4 | 6
Maghreb FC | 4 | 3 | 7
Ukay Positive | 1 | 1 | 2
Arslan FC | 0 | 2 | 2
Southern FC | 1 | 2 | 3

Semi-final
Seri Gemilang Outlaw | 0 | 1 | 1
OSV UK | 1 | 2 | 3
Maghreb FC | 2 | 3 | 5
Southern FC | 1 | 0 | 1

Final
OSV UK | 2
Maghreb FC | 0

=== Round of 16 ===
==== First leg ====
| 14 August 2022 | Maghreb FC | 2–2 | KBLP U23 | Taman Melawati |
| 15:00 UTC+8 | | | | Stadium: Padang KLFA |

| 14 August 2022 | Ukay Positive | 2–1 | Shah Alam Rangers | Taman Melawati |
| 16:15 UTC+8 | | | | Stadium: Padang KLFA |

| 14 August 2022 | FC Cheras Road | 2–1 | Kickers FC | Taman Melawati |
| 17:30 UTC+8 | | | | Stadium: Padang KLFA |

| 14 August 2022 | OSV FC | 2–1 | GPS FC | Taman Melawati |
| 18:45 UTC+8 | | | | Stadium: Padang KLFA |

| 14 August 2022 | Seri Gemilang Outlaw | 0–2 | Mix Gen Knight FC | Bangi |
| 18:15 UTC+8 | | | | Stadium: Padang MK Felda |

| 14 August 2022 | Sky United | 1–0 | KVC FC | Bangi |
| 17:45 UTC+8 | | | | Stadium: Padang MK Felda |

| 14 August 2022 | Salak Tinggi United | 1–1 | Arslan FC | Bangi |
| 21:00 UTC+8 | | | | Stadium: Padang MK Felda |

| 14 August 2022 | Southern FC | 3–0 | Team Haq FC | Bangi |
| 22:15 UTC+8 | | | | Stadium: Padang MK Felda |

==== Second leg ====
| 21 August 2022 | GPS FC | 1–3 | OSV FC | Shah Alam |
| 14:40 UTC+8 | | | | Stadium: EV Arena Padang A |

OSV FC won 5-2 on aggregate.

| 21 August 2022 | Shah Alam Rangers | 1–4 | Ukay Positive | Shah Alam |
| 15:50 UTC+8 | | | | Stadium: EV Arena Padang A |

Ukay Positive won 6-2 on aggregate.

| 21 August 2022 | Kickers FC | 1–5 | FC Cheras Road | Shah Alam |
| 14:40 UTC+8 | | | | Stadium: EV Arena Padang B |

FC Cheras Road won 7-2 on aggregate.

| 21 August 2022 | KBLP U23 | 0–2 | Maghreb FC | Shah Alam |
| 15:50 UTC+8 | | | | Stadium: EV Arena Padang B |

Maghreb FC won 4-2 on aggregate.

| 21 August 2022 | Team Haq FC | 2–1 | Southern FC | Bangi |
| 14:30 UTC+8 | | | | Stadium: Padang MK Felda |

Southern FC won 4-2 on aggregate.

| 21 August 2022 | Arslan FC | 0–0 | Salak Tinggi United | Bangi |
| 16:00 UTC+8 | | | | Stadium: Padang MK Felda |

Arslan FC won on away goal regulation, aggregate 1-1.

| 21 August 2022 | KVC FC | 1–1 | Sky United | Bangi |
| 17:15 UTC+8 | | | | Stadium: Padang MK Felda |

Sky United won 2-1 on aggregate.

| 21 August 2022 | Mix Gen Knight FC | 1–3 | Seri Gemilang Outlaw | Bangi |
| 18:30 UTC+8 | | | | Stadium: Padang MK Felda |

Seri Gemilang Outlaw won on away goal regulation, aggregate 3-3.

=== Quarter-finals ===
==== First leg ====
| 28 August 2022 | Maghreb FC | 4–1 | Ukay Positive FC | Taman Melawati |
| 15:00 UTC+8 | | | | Stadium: Padang KLFA |

| 28 August 2022 | FC Cheras Road | 0–2 | OSV UK | Taman Melawati |
| 16:15 UTC+8 | | | | Stadium: Padang KLFA |

| 28 August 2022 | Seri Gemilang Outlaw | 0–0 | Sky United | Bandar Baru Bangi |
| 15:00 UTC+8 | | | | Stadium: Arena Jubli Perak |

| 28 August 2022 | Arslan FC | 0–1 | Southern FC | Bandar Baru Bangi |
| 16:15 UTC+8 | | | | Stadium: Arena Jubli Perak |

==== Second leg ====
| 4 September 2022 | OSV UK | 4–1 | FC Cheras Road | Taman Melawati |
| 15:00 UTC+8 | | | | Stadium: Padang KLFA |

OSV UK won 6-1 on aggregate.

| 4 September 2022 | Ukay Positive | 3–1 | Maghreb FC | Taman Melawati |
| 16:15 UTC+8 | | | | Stadium: Padang KLFA |

Maghreb FC won 7-2 on aggregate.

| 4 September 2022 | Southern FC | 2–2 | Arslan FC | Bandar Baru Bangi |
| 19:00 UTC+8 | | | | Stadium: Arena Jubli Perak |

Southern FC won 3-2 on aggregate.

| 4 September 2022 | Sky United | 0–1 | Seri Gemilang Outlaw | Bandar Baru Bangi |
| 20:30 UTC+8 | | | | Stadium: Arena Jubli Perak |

Seri Gemilang Outlaw won 1-0 on aggregate.

=== Semi-finals ===
==== First leg ====
| 11 September 2022 | Southern FC | 1–2 | Maghreb FC | Bandar Baru Bangi |
| 15:00 UTC+8 | | | | Stadium: Arena Jubli Perak |

| 11 September 2022 | Seri Gemilang Outlaw | 0–1 | OSV UK | Bandar Baru Bangi |
| 16:15 UTC+8 | | | | Stadium: Arena Jubli Perak |

==== Second leg ====
| 25 September 2022 | Maghreb FC | 3–0 | Southern FC | Bangsar |
| 15:00 UTC+8 | | | | Stadium: UM Versity |

Maghreb FC won 5-1 on aggregate.

| 25 September 2022 | OSV UK | 2–1 | Seri Gemilang Outlaw | Kampung Baru, Kuala Lumpur |
| 14:30 UTC+8 | | | | Stadium: Stadium Raja Muda Musa |

OSV UK won 3-1 on aggregate.

=== Final ===
| 2 October 2022 | OSV UK | 2–0 | Maghreb FC | Subang Jaya |
| 21:00 UTC+8 | | | | Stadium: Arena MBSJ Stadium |

- OSV UK FC Champions

=== Liga Mahsa-Kronos M5 ===
Liga Mahsa-Kronos M5
- Season: 2022
- Champions: Republic of Borneo
- Promoted: Republic of Borneo; MAHSA City

| Pos | Team | Pld | W | D | L | GF | GA | GD | Pts | Promotion, qualification or relegation |
|---|---|---|---|---|---|---|---|---|---|---|
| 1 | MAHSA City | 8 | 6 | 1 | 1 | 19 | 5 | +14 | 19 | Promotion to 2023 Malaysia M4 League |
| 2 | Republic of Borneo (C) | 9 | 5 | 3 | 1 | 27 | 12 | +15 | 18 | Promotion to 2023 Malaysia M4 League |
| 3 | Shah Alam Rovers | 8 | 5 | 0 | 3 | 11 | 7 | +4 | 15 | Advance to Semi-final |
| 4 | Bujangga FC | 8 | 4 | 3 | 1 | 13 | 12 | +1 | 15 | Advance to Semi-final |
| 5 | Mixed FC | 8 | 4 | 2 | 2 | 20 | 7 | +13 | 14 | |
| 6 | MAHSA United | 8 | 3 | 2 | 3 | 14 | 8 | +6 | 11 | |
| 7 | NBK Empire F.C. | 8 | 2 | 3 | 3 | 19 | 15 | +4 | 9 | |
| 8 | Tengah FC | 8 | 2 | 3 | 3 | 10 | 13 | −3 | 9 | |
| 9 | Skuad Projek 23 | 8 | 1 | 1 | 6 | 14 | 28 | −14 | 4 | |
| 10 | Serdang FC | 8 | 0 | 0 | 8 | 1 | 30 | −29 | 0 | |

Updated to match(es) played on 25 Sep 2022. Source: Liga Mahsa-Kronos
Rules for classification: 1) Points; 2) Goal difference; 3) Number of goals scored.
(C) Champions

=== Knock-out stage ===
Semifinals
Mahsa City | 2
Shah Alam Rovers | 0
Republic of Borneo | 5
Bujangga FC | 1

Final
Mahsa City | 0
Republic of Borneo | 1

=== Putrajaya League ===
Putrajaya League
- Season: 2022
- Champions: JAKIM
- Promoted: JAKIM

| Pos | Team | Pld | W | D | L | GF | GA | GD | Pts | Promotion or qualification |
|---|---|---|---|---|---|---|---|---|---|---|
| 1 | JAKIM (C, P) | 10 | 7 | 2 | 1 | 22 | 3 | +19 | 23 | Promotion to 2023 Malaysia M4 League |
| 2 | Evo PM Tepi FC | 10 | 7 | 2 | 1 | 24 | 9 | +15 | 23 | |
| 3 | PPJ FC | 10 | 7 | 1 | 2 | 19 | 16 | +3 | 22 | |
| 4 | Red Panthers FC | 10 | 5 | 4 | 1 | 17 | 11 | +6 | 19 | |
| 5 | MA FC | 10 | 5 | 0 | 5 | 23 | 18 | +5 | 15 | |
| 6 | Putrajaya United | 10 | 4 | 3 | 3 | 17 | 16 | +1 | 15 | |
| 7 | JPP FC | 10 | 3 | 3 | 4 | 15 | 15 | 0 | 12 | |
| 8 | Puraya FC | 10 | 3 | 1 | 6 | 14 | 19 | −5 | 10 | |
| 9 | Qarl United | 10 | 1 | 3 | 6 | 13 | 28 | −15 | 6 | |
| 10 | Putrajaya U19 | 10 | 1 | 2 | 7 | 10 | 22 | −12 | 5 | |
| 11 | T.T United | 10 | 0 | 3 | 7 | 7 | 24 | −17 | 3 | |
| 12 | Immigration II | 0 | 0 | 0 | 0 | 0 | 0 | 0 | 0 | Withdrew |

Updated to match(es) played on 9 Dis 2022. Source: Putrajaya League
Rules for classification: 1) Points; 2) Goal difference; 3) Number of goals scored.
(C) Champions; (P) Promoted

== East Coast Zone ==
=== Kuantan Amateur League ===
Kuantan Amateur League
- Season: 2022
- Champions: YPM FC
- Promoted: YPM FC; Cendawan FC

| Pos | Team | Pld | W | D | L | GF | GA | GD | Pts | Promotion, qualification or relegation |
|---|---|---|---|---|---|---|---|---|---|---|
| 1 | YPM FC (C) | 11 | 10 | 1 | 0 | 45 | 3 | +42 | 31 | Promotion to 2023 Malaysia M4 League |
| 2 | Cendawan FC | 10 | 7 | 3 | 0 | 27 | 3 | +24 | 24 | Promotion to 2023 Malaysia M4 League |
| 3 | Yayasan Pahang | 11 | 7 | 2 | 2 | 30 | 5 | +25 | 23 | |
| 4 | Vieura FC | 11 | 6 | 1 | 4 | 24 | 8 | +16 | 19 | |
| 5 | Kuantan United | 11 | 5 | 2 | 4 | 19 | 14 | +5 | 17 | |
| 6 | Alam Mahkota | 9 | 5 | 0 | 4 | 24 | 12 | +12 | 15 | |
| 7 | Jerantut United | 10 | 5 | 0 | 5 | 16 | 12 | +4 | 15 | |
| 8 | Carnal FC | 10 | 4 | 1 | 5 | 12 | 17 | −5 | 13 | |
| 9 | MBD Pekan | 11 | 2 | 4 | 5 | 8 | 21 | −13 | 10 | |
| 10 | Kweker FC | 10 | 1 | 2 | 7 | 6 | 33 | −27 | 5 | |
| 11 | Ketapang Hilir | 11 | 1 | 2 | 8 | 7 | 47 | −40 | 5 | |
| 12 | Real Kuantan | 11 | 0 | 2 | 9 | 10 | 53 | −43 | 2 | |

Updated to match(es) played on 10 October 2022. Source: Kuantan Amateur League
Rules for classification: 1) Points; 2) Goal difference; 3) Number of goals scored.
(C) Champions

== South Zone ==
=== Nogori M5 League (League 1) ===
==== Group A ====
| Pos | Team | Pld | W | D | L | GF | GA | GD | Pts | Promotion or qualification |
|---|---|---|---|---|---|---|---|---|---|---|
| 1 | Ayrish FC | 11 | 10 | 0 | 1 | 59 | 6 | +53 | 30 | Advance to knock-out stage |
| 2 | Bunga Raya F.C. | 11 | 9 | 1 | 1 | 40 | 4 | +36 | 28 | Promotion to 2023 Malaysia M4 League |
| 3 | AMZ FC | 11 | 7 | 3 | 1 | 32 | 16 | +16 | 24 | Advance to knock-out stage |
| 4 | TST FC | 11 | 6 | 1 | 4 | 23 | 16 | +7 | 19 | Advance to knock-out stage |
| 5 | LBeeJ FC | 11 | 5 | 1 | 5 | 26 | 15 | +11 | 16 | |
| 6 | Cyberfox FC | 11 | 5 | 0 | 6 | 15 | 13 | +2 | 15 | |
| 7 | Starmark FC | 11 | 4 | 2 | 5 | 15 | 23 | −8 | 14 | |
| 8 | HC FC | 11 | 3 | 3 | 5 | 21 | 29 | −8 | 12 | |
| 9 | Sentosa FC | 11 | 3 | 2 | 6 | 12 | 25 | −13 | 11 | |
| 10 | Kg. Rasah FC | 11 | 3 | 1 | 7 | 21 | 20 | +1 | 10 | |
| 11 | Nesdeaf FC | 11 | 2 | 0 | 9 | 6 | 50 | −44 | 6 | |
| 12 | AAP FC | 11 | 0 | 0 | 11 | 1 | 53 | −52 | 0 | |

Updated to match(es) played on unknown. Source: Nogori M5 League
Rules for classification: 1) Points; 2) Goal difference; 3) Number of goals scored.

==== Group B ====
| Pos | Team | Pld | W | D | L | GF | GA | GD | Pts | Promotion or qualification |
|---|---|---|---|---|---|---|---|---|---|---|
| 1 | MP Port Dickson (C, P) | 11 | 8 | 2 | 1 | 28 | 8 | +20 | 26 | Promotion to 2023 Malaysia M4 League |
| 2 | Mad Brothers FC | 11 | 7 | 2 | 2 | 22 | 7 | +15 | 23 | Advance to knock-out stage |
| 3 | Galatikos FC | 11 | 6 | 3 | 2 | 31 | 8 | +23 | 21 | Advance to knock-out stage |
| 4 | 9 Club FC | 11 | 6 | 3 | 2 | 21 | 9 | +12 | 21 | Advance to knock-out stage |
| 5 | TTJ FC | 11 | 6 | 2 | 3 | 17 | 9 | +8 | 20 | |
| 6 | Merbau FC | 11 | 5 | 1 | 5 | 17 | 16 | +1 | 16 | |
| 7 | Seremban FC | 11 | 4 | 3 | 4 | 17 | 17 | 0 | 15 | |
| 8 | Al-Ikhlas FC | 11 | 4 | 1 | 6 | 12 | 17 | −5 | 13 | |
| 9 | Bega FT | 11 | 3 | 3 | 5 | 17 | 20 | −3 | 12 | |
| 10 | Flizzie FC | 11 | 4 | 0 | 7 | 10 | 16 | −6 | 12 | |
| 11 | BT FC | 11 | 2 | 1 | 8 | 8 | 33 | −25 | 7 | |
| 12 | X-Petra FC | 11 | 0 | 1 | 10 | 4 | 42 | −38 | 1 | |

Updated to match(es) played on unknown. Source: Nogori M5 League
Rules for classification: 1) Points; 2) Goal difference; 3) Number of goals scored.
(C) Champions; (P) Promoted

==== Knock-out stage ====
Quarterfinals
Mad Brothers FC | 0
AMZ FC | 3
Ayrish FC | 1
9 Club FC | 2
Bunga Raya FC | 0
Galatikos FC | 3
MPPD FC | 3
TST FC | 0

Semifinals
AMZ FC | 0
9 Club FC | 1
Galatikos FC | 0
MPPD FC | 3

Final
9 Club FC | 1
MPPD FC | 2

==== Quarter-finals ====
| 20 August 2022 | Mad Brothers FC | 0-3 | AMZ FC | Port Dickson |
| 15:00 UTC+8 | | | | Stadium: Padang Merdeka |

| 20 August 2022 | Ayrish FC | 1-2 | 9 Club FC | Port Dickson |
| 17:15 UTC+8 | | | | Stadium: Padang Merdeka |

| 21 August 2022 | Bunga Raya FC | 0-3 | Galatikos FC | Kuala Pilah |
| 15:00 UTC+8 | | | | Stadium: Kuala Pilah Mini Stadium |

| 21 August 2022 | MPPD FC | 3-0 | TST FC | Kuala Pilah |
| 17:15 UTC+8 | | | | Stadium: Kuala Pilah Mini Stadium |

==== Semi-finals ====
| 2 October 2022 | MPPD FC | 3-0 | Galatikos FC | Port Dickson |
| 16:00 UTC+8 | | | | Stadium: Padang Merdeka |

| 2 October 2022 | AMZ FC | 0-1 | 9 Club FC | Rembau |
| 16:00 UTC+8 | | | | Stadium: Rembau Mini Stadium |

==== Finals ====
| 30 October 2022 | MPPD FC | 2-1 | 9 Club FC | Port Dickson |
| 16:00 UTC+8 | | | | Stadium: Padang Merdeka |

=== Nogori M5 League (League 2) ===
==== Group A ====
| Pos | Team | Pld | W | D | L | GF | GA | GD | Pts | Qualification |
|---|---|---|---|---|---|---|---|---|---|---|
| 1 | NS Cyberfox F.C. | 4 | 4 | 0 | 0 | 9 | 4 | +5 | 12 | Promotion to 2023 Malaysia M4 League |
| 2 | Bunga Raya FC II | 4 | 3 | 0 | 1 | 8 | 2 | +6 | 9 | Advance to knock-out stage |
| 3 | Mixstar FC | 4 | 1 | 0 | 3 | 6 | 8 | −2 | 3 | Advance to knock-out stage |
| 4 | Morning Glory FC | 4 | 1 | 0 | 3 | 4 | 7 | −3 | 3 | Advance to knock-out stage |
| 5 | Red Warriors FC | 4 | 1 | 0 | 3 | 5 | 11 | −6 | 3 | |
| 6 | Kaki Sembang FC | 0 | 0 | 0 | 0 | 0 | 0 | 0 | 0 | Disqualified |
| 7 | Tenaga Baru FC | 0 | 0 | 0 | 0 | 0 | 0 | 0 | 0 | Disqualified |

Updated to match(es) played on 16 Oct 2022. Source: Nogori M5 League
Rules for classification: 1) Points; 2) Goal difference; 3) Number of goals scored.

==== Group B ====
| Pos | Team | Pld | W | D | L | GF | GA | GD | Pts | Qualification |
|---|---|---|---|---|---|---|---|---|---|---|
| 1 | Seventeen FC | 5 | 5 | 0 | 0 | 28 | 1 | +27 | 15 | Advance to knock-out stage |
| 2 | Harini FT II (C) | 5 | 3 | 0 | 2 | 19 | 5 | +14 | 9 | Advance to knock-out stage |
| 3 | MB Seremban FC | 5 | 3 | 0 | 2 | 14 | 9 | +5 | 9 | Advance to knock-out stage |
| 4 | UiTM NS FC | 5 | 2 | 0 | 3 | 12 | 7 | +5 | 6 | Withdrew |
| 5 | Ampangan Rovers | 5 | 2 | 0 | 3 | 5 | 20 | −15 | 6 | Withdrew |
| 6 | Yayasan FC | 5 | 0 | 0 | 5 | 1 | 37 | −36 | 0 | Advance to knock-out stage |
| 7 | Rembau IKTBN FC | 0 | 0 | 0 | 0 | 0 | 0 | 0 | 0 | Disqualified |

Updated to match(es) played on 16 Oct 2022. Source: Nogori M5 League
Rules for classification: 1) Points; 2) Goal difference; 3) Number of goals scored.
(C) Champions

==== Knock-out stage ====
Quarterfinals
Harini FT II | 8 | 6 | 14
Mixstars FC | 0 | 0 | 0
NS Cyberfox FC | 5 | 5 | 10
Yayasan FC | 1 | 0 | 1
Seventeen FC | 5 | 3 | 8
Morning Glory FC | 0 | 0 | 0
Bunga Raya FC II | 5
MB Seremban FC | 1

Semifinals
Harini FT II | 2 | 2 | 4
NS Cyberfox FC | 2 | 1 | 3
Seventeen FC | 1 | 0 | 1
Bunga Raya FC II | 2 | 3 | 5

Final
Harini FT II | 3
Bunga Raya FC II | 2

=== Quarter-finals ===
==== First leg ====
| 14 October 2022 | Harini FT II | 8–0 | Mixstars FC | Bandar Sri Sendayan |
| 21:00 UTC+8 | | | | Stadium: IRC Arena Sendayan |

| 15 October 2022 | NS Cyberfox FC | 5–1 | Yayasan FC | Kuala Pilah |
| 15:00 UTC+8 | | | | Stadium: Kuala Pilah Mini Stadium |

| 16 October 2022 | Seventeen FC | 5–0 | Morning Glory FC | Kuala Pilah |
| 15:00 UTC+8 | | | | Stadium: Kuala Pilah Mini Stadium |

| 16 October 2022 | Bunga Raya FC II | 5–1 | MB Seremban FC | Kuala Pilah |
| 17:15 UTC+8 | | | | Stadium: Kuala Pilah Mini Stadium |

==== Second leg ====
| 22 October 2022 | Mixstars FC | 0–6 | Harini FT II | Rembau |
| 17:15 UTC+8 | | | | Stadium: Rembau Mini Stadium |

| October 2022 | Yayasan FC | 0–5 | NS Cyberfox FC |
| --:-- UTC+8 |

| October 2022 | Morning Glory FC | 0–3 | Seventeen FC |
| --:-- UTC+8 |

| 22 October 2022 | MB Seremban FC | v | Bunga Raya FC II | Rembau |
| 15:00 UTC+8 | | | | Stadium: Rembau Mini Stadium |

=== Semi-finals ===
==== First leg ====
| 1 November 2022 | Harini FT II | 2–2 | NS Cyberfox FC | Serdang |
| 21:00 UTC+8 | | | | Stadium: UPM Stadium |

| 4 November 2022 | Bunga Raya FC II | 2–1 | Seventeen FC | Bandar Sri Sendayan |
| 21:00 UTC+8 | | | | Stadium: IRC Arena Sendayan |

==== Second leg ====
| 7 November 2022 | NS Cyberfox FC | 1–2 | Harini FT II | Serdang |
| 21:00 UTC+8 | | | | Stadium: UPM Stadium |

| 2022 | Seventeen FC | 0–3 | Bunga Raya FC II |
| --:-- UTC+8 |

=== Finals ===
29 November 2022
21:00 UTC+8

| Harini FT II | 3-2 | Bunga Raya FC II |

UPM Stadium, Serdang

== Borneo Zone ==
=== Liga M5 Piala Dato Verdon Bahanda P167 2022 ===
==== Group A ====
| Pos | Team | Pld | W | D | L | GF | GA | GD | Pts | Qualification |
|---|---|---|---|---|---|---|---|---|---|---|
| 1 | Matunggong United | 7 | 5 | 2 | 0 | 16 | 4 | +12 | 17 | Advance to knock-out stage |
| 2 | Zero FC | 7 | 4 | 2 | 1 | 12 | 4 | +8 | 14 | Advance to knock-out stage |
| 3 | GP FC (C) | 7 | 4 | 1 | 2 | 23 | 6 | +17 | 13 | Advance to knock-out stage |
| 4 | OMB | 7 | 4 | 1 | 2 | 9 | 8 | +1 | 13 | Advance to knock-out stage |
| 5 | Bayu FT | 7 | 4 | 0 | 3 | 19 | 11 | +8 | 12 | |
| 6 | Kudat United | 7 | 2 | 2 | 3 | 20 | 23 | −3 | 8 | |
| 7 | Jagahi FC | 7 | 1 | 0 | 6 | 9 | 25 | −16 | 3 | |
| 8 | Batinggal FC | 7 | 0 | 0 | 7 | 5 | 32 | −27 | 0 | |

Updated to match(es) played on 23 Sep 2022. Source: Piala Dato Verdon
Rules for classification: 1) Points; 2) Goal difference; 3) Number of goals scored.
(C) Champions

==== Group B ====
| Pos | Team | Pld | W | D | L | GF | GA | GD | Pts | Qualification |
|---|---|---|---|---|---|---|---|---|---|---|
| 1 | Ultra Hawks | 7 | 5 | 1 | 1 | 26 | 7 | +19 | 16 | Advance to knock-out stage |
| 2 | Sinba FC | 7 | 4 | 1 | 2 | 12 | 7 | +5 | 13 | Advance to knock-out stage |
| 3 | Rakan Cops | 7 | 4 | 1 | 2 | 11 | 10 | +1 | 13 | Advance to knock-out stage |
| 4 | LBK | 7 | 3 | 3 | 1 | 16 | 7 | +9 | 12 | Advance to knock-out stage |
| 5 | Mantap FC | 7 | 4 | 0 | 3 | 11 | 12 | −1 | 12 | |
| 6 | Bayangan FC | 7 | 3 | 0 | 4 | 9 | 9 | 0 | 9 | |
| 7 | Edu Kudat FC | 7 | 1 | 0 | 6 | 5 | 18 | −13 | 3 | |
| 8 | Mengayau FC | 7 | 1 | 0 | 6 | 5 | 25 | −20 | 3 | |

Updated to match(es) played on 23 Sep 2022. Source: Piala Dato Verdon
Rules for classification: 1) Points; 2) Goal difference; 3) Number of goals scored.

==== Group C ====
| Pos | Team | Pld | W | D | L | GF | GA | GD | Pts | Qualification |
|---|---|---|---|---|---|---|---|---|---|---|
| 1 | Bandau FC | 6 | 6 | 0 | 0 | 36 | 9 | +27 | 18 | Advance to knock-out stage |
| 2 | Kacaw FC | 6 | 3 | 2 | 1 | 19 | 13 | +6 | 11 | Advance to knock-out stage |
| 3 | Muhibbah FC | 6 | 3 | 1 | 2 | 9 | 12 | −3 | 10 | Advance to knock-out stage |
| 4 | Generasi FC | 6 | 2 | 2 | 2 | 17 | 13 | +4 | 8 | Advance to knock-out stage |
| 5 | Kilat FC | 6 | 2 | 1 | 3 | 14 | 14 | 0 | 7 | |
| 6 | Piranah FC | 6 | 1 | 1 | 4 | 5 | 13 | −8 | 4 | |
| 7 | KBWP FC | 6 | 0 | 1 | 5 | 3 | 29 | −26 | 1 | |
| 8 | Telaga FC | 0 | 0 | 0 | 0 | 0 | 0 | 0 | 0 | Withdrew |

Updated to match(es) played on 23 Sep 2022. Source: Piala Dato Verdon
Rules for classification: 1) Points; 2) Goal difference; 3) Number of goals scored.

==== Group D ====
| Pos | Team | Pld | W | D | L | GF | GA | GD | Pts | Qualification |
|---|---|---|---|---|---|---|---|---|---|---|
| 1 | Pamila CD | 7 | 5 | 1 | 1 | 29 | 7 | +22 | 16 | Advance to knock-out stage |
| 2 | Sinambung FC | 7 | 5 | 1 | 1 | 16 | 9 | +7 | 16 | Advance to knock-out stage |
| 3 | Licak Projek | 7 | 4 | 3 | 0 | 25 | 8 | +17 | 15 | Advance to knock-out stage |
| 4 | Sugo FC | 7 | 3 | 2 | 2 | 14 | 7 | +7 | 11 | Advance to knock-out stage |
| 5 | Maba FC | 7 | 2 | 3 | 2 | 10 | 9 | +1 | 9 | |
| 6 | Legacy FC | 7 | 2 | 0 | 5 | 14 | 24 | −10 | 6 | |
| 7 | Wira FC | 7 | 1 | 0 | 6 | 10 | 40 | −30 | 3 | |
| 8 | FU FC | 7 | 0 | 2 | 5 | 9 | 23 | −14 | 2 | |

Updated to match(es) played on 23 Sep 2022. Source: Piala Dato Verdon
Rules for classification: 1) Points; 2) Goal difference; 3) Number of goals scored.

=== Play-off round ===
==== Bracket ====
Round of 16
Matunggong United | 4
Muhibbah FC | 0
Sinba FC | 0
Sugo FC | 1
Ultra Hawks FC | 4 (3)
Licak Projek | 4 (5)
Kacaw FC | 2
OMB FC | 0
Bandau FC | 4
GP FC | 5
Sinambung FC | 0
LBK | 3
Pamilya CD | 2
Rakan Cop | 1
Zero FC | 2 (5)
Generasi FC | 2 (6)

Quarter-final
Matunggong United | 3
Sugo FC | 2
Licak Projek | 0
Kacaw FC | 1
GP FC | 2
LBK | 1
Pamilya CD | 2
Generasi FC | 0

Semi-final
Matunggong United | 1
Kacaw FC | 3
GP FC | 2
Pamilya CD | 1

Final
Kacaw FC | 2
GP FC | 3

=== S Ligue M5 Sarawak ===
==== Group A ====
| Pos | Team | Pld | W | D | L | GF | GA | GD | Pts | Qualification |
|---|---|---|---|---|---|---|---|---|---|---|
| 1 | PFA Odin FC | 6 | 6 | 0 | 0 | 23 | 1 | +22 | 18 | Advance to knock-out stage |
| 2 | Afifah FC | 6 | 4 | 1 | 1 | 18 | 3 | +15 | 13 | Advance to knock-out stage |
| 3 | Pusak FC | 6 | 4 | 0 | 2 | 12 | 11 | +1 | 12 | Advance to knock-out stage |
| 4 | Xico 84 United | 6 | 3 | 1 | 2 | 22 | 10 | +12 | 10 | Advance to knock-out stage |
| 5 | DJB FC | 6 | 1 | 0 | 5 | 7 | 17 | −10 | 3 | |
| 6 | SSG FC | 6 | 1 | 0 | 5 | 6 | 21 | −15 | 3 | |
| 7 | Lotri 7 FC | 6 | 1 | 0 | 5 | 2 | 27 | −25 | 3 | |

Updated to match(es) played on 9 Nov 2022. Source: S Ligue M5 Sarawak
Rules for classification: 1) Points; 2) Goal difference; 3) Number of goals scored.

==== Group B ====
| Pos | Team | Pld | W | D | L | GF | GA | GD | Pts | Qualification |
|---|---|---|---|---|---|---|---|---|---|---|
| 1 | AS United FC (C) | 6 | 5 | 0 | 1 | 17 | 7 | +10 | 15 | Advance to knock-out stage |
| 2 | KSR TSI FC | 6 | 3 | 2 | 1 | 14 | 8 | +6 | 11 | Advance to knock-out stage |
| 3 | KSK Satok | 6 | 3 | 2 | 1 | 9 | 6 | +3 | 11 | Advance to knock-out stage |
| 4 | Zerynz SC | 6 | 3 | 0 | 3 | 14 | 11 | +3 | 9 | Advance to knock-out stage |
| 5 | Admania FC | 6 | 3 | 0 | 3 | 14 | 15 | −1 | 9 | |
| 6 | Mix JPX FT | 6 | 0 | 2 | 4 | 4 | 14 | −10 | 2 | |
| 7 | Nufa FC | 6 | 0 | 2 | 4 | 5 | 16 | −11 | 2 | |

Updated to match(es) played on 9 Nov 2022. Source: S Ligue M5 Sarawak
Rules for classification: 1) Points; 2) Goal difference; 3) Number of goals scored.
(C) Champions

==== Knock-out stage ====
Quarterfinals
AS United | 3 | 3 | 6
Xico84 United | 0 | 1 | 1
KSK Satok | 1 | 2 | 3
Afifah FC | 1 | 0 | 1
PFA Odin FC | 0 | 1 | 1
Zerynz SC | 3 | 1 | 4
KSR TSI FC | 0 | 2 | 2
Pusak FC | 0 | 1 | 1

Semifinals
AS United | 1 | 0 | 1 (5)
KSK Satok | 1 | 0 | 1 (4)
Zerynz SC | 2 | 2 | 4
KSR TSI FC | 1 | 1 | 2

Final
AS United | 3
Zerynz SC | 0

=== Ligue M5 Bintulu 2022 ===
==== Group A ====
| Pos | Team | Pld | W | D | L | GF | GA | GD | Pts | Qualification |
|---|---|---|---|---|---|---|---|---|---|---|
| 1 | Biscom | 4 | 2 | 2 | 0 | 4 | 1 | +3 | 8 | Advance to knock-out stage |
| 2 | MY Team | 4 | 2 | 0 | 2 | 3 | 4 | −1 | 6 | Promotion to 2023 Malaysia M4 League |
| 3 | Empurau FC | 4 | 1 | 2 | 1 | 6 | 6 | 0 | 5 | Advance to knock-out stage |
| 4 | Ensumbar FC | 4 | 1 | 1 | 2 | 3 | 4 | −1 | 4 | Advance to knock-out stage |
| 5 | Rare Legacy FC | 4 | 1 | 1 | 2 | 2 | 3 | −1 | 4 | |

Updated to match(es) played on 18 Dec 2022. Source: Ligue M5 Bintulu
Rules for classification: 1) Points; 2) Goal difference; 3) Number of goals scored.

==== Group B ====
| Pos | Team | Pld | W | D | L | GF | GA | GD | Pts | Qualification |
|---|---|---|---|---|---|---|---|---|---|---|
| 1 | SDP Project Park (C) | 4 | 3 | 1 | 0 | 15 | 2 | +13 | 10 | Advance to knock-out stage |
| 2 | Banqku FC | 4 | 3 | 0 | 1 | 11 | 5 | +6 | 9 | Advance to knock-out stage |
| 3 | Kenyana OU | 4 | 2 | 0 | 2 | 6 | 6 | 0 | 6 | Advance to knock-out stage |
| 4 | Bubar FC | 4 | 1 | 1 | 2 | 4 | 6 | −2 | 4 | Advance to knock-out stage |
| 5 | Thunderbolt FC | 4 | 0 | 0 | 4 | 2 | 19 | −17 | 0 | |

Updated to match(es) played on 18 Dec 2022. Source: Ligue M5 Bintulu
Rules for classification: 1) Points; 2) Goal difference; 3) Number of goals scored.
(C) Champions

==== Knock-out stage ====
Quarterfinals
Biscom FC | 2
Bubar FC | 1
Banqku FC | 1
Empurau FC | 0
Ensumbar FC | 1
SDP Project FC | 4
Kenyana OU | 1
MY Team | 2

Semifinals
Biscom FC | 3
Banqku FC | 2
SDP Project FC | 2
MY Team | 0

Final
Biscom FC | 0
SDP Project FC | 3

== See also ==
- 2022 Malaysia Super League
- 2022 Malaysia Premier League
- 2022 Malaysia M3 League
- 2022 Malaysia FA Cup
