= Sukri Hamid =

Malaysian footballer

Personal information
- Full name: Ahmad Sukri bin Ab Hamid
- Date of birth: 3 May 1992 (age 34)
- Place of birth: Perak, Malaysia
- Height: 1.82 m (5 ft 11 1/2 in)
- Position: Defender

Team information
- Current team: Kg. Rawa-Butterworth Rangers
- Number: 2

Youth career
- 2013: Perak U21

Senior career*
Years	Team	Apps	(Gls)
2014–2017	Perak		
2017	→ PKNP (loan)	17	(1)
2018	Kelantan	2	(0)
2018–2019	PKNP	27	(0)
2020	Perak II		
2021–2023	Petaling Jaya City	16	(0)
2023	Harini		
2024–2025	Gombak		
2025–26	AAK Puncak Alam		
2026–	Kg. Rawa-Butterworth Rangers		
- * Club domestic league appearances and goals

Ahmad Sukri bin Ab Hamid (born 3 May 1992) is a Malaysian professional footballer who plays as a defender for Malaysia A2 Amateur League club Kg. Rawa-Butterworth Rangers.

== Club career ==
Sukri began his career playing for Perak youth team. He made his senior club debut for Perak in 2014. In 2017, Sukri was loaned out to PKNP until end of season.

On 6 December 2017, Sukri signed a two-year contract with Malaysia Super League side Kelantan. Sukri made his debut for Kelantan in a 0–3 defeat to Pahang on 10 February 2018 played for 90 minutes.

On 14 February 2018, he signed back to PKNP after his contract has been terminated by Kelantan. He has been appointed as club's captain since he return to the club.

== Career statistics ==
=== Club ===
As of 4 September 2021

Appearances and goals by club, season and competition
Club	Season	League			Cup		League Cup		Continental		Total	
Club	Season	Division	Apps	Goals	Apps	Goals	Apps	Goals	Apps	Goals	Apps	Goals
Perak	2014	Malaysia Super League	0	1	0	0	0	0	—		0	1
Perak	2015	Malaysia Super League	0	0	1	0	1	0	—		14	0
Perak	2016	Malaysia Super League	2	0	1	0	0	0	—		3	0
Perak	Total		0	0	0	0	0	0	0	0	0	0
PKNP (loan)	2017	Malaysia Premier League	17	1	3	0	8	0	—		28	1
PKNP (loan)	Total		17	1	3	0	8	0	0	0	28	1
Kelantan	2018	Malaysia Super League	2	0	0	0	0	0	—		2	0
Kelantan	Total		2	0	0	0	0	0	0	0	2	0
PKNP	2018	Malaysia Super League	12	0	2	1	0	0	—		14	1
PKNP	2019	Malaysia Super League	15	0	3	0	0	0	—		18	0
PKNP	Total		27	0	5	1	0	0	0	0	32	1
Perak II	2020	Malaysia Premier League	3	0	0	0	0	0	—		3	0
Perak II	Total		3	0	0	0	0	0	0	0	3	0
Petaling Jaya City	2021	Malaysia Super League	16	0	0	0	0	0	—		16	0
Petaling Jaya City	Total		16	0	0	0	0	0	0	0	16	0
Career Total			0	0	0	0	0	0	0	0	0	0
