= MPFL Division 2 =

Malaysian top division men's futsal league

- Organising body: Football Association of Malaysia (FAM)
- Founded: 2024; 2 years ago
- Country: Malaysia
- Confederation: AFC
- Number of clubs: 13
- Level on pyramid: 2
- Promotion to: MPFL Division 1
- Domestic cup: Malaysia Futsal Cup
- Current champions: USMKK (1st title) (2025)
- Most championships: Kelantan; USMKK (1 title each)
- Broadcaster(s): Astro Arena
- Website: Official website
- Current: 2025 MPFL Division 2

The Malaysia Premier Futsal League Division 2, commonly abbreviated as MPFL Division 2, is the second division of futsal in Malaysia, currently contested by 13 teams. Seasons usually run from May to July.

== Competition format ==
The tournament is played in a single-league format, where each team will faces other in a round-robin fashion. Top two teams play in the qualifying play-off to the Malaysia Futsal Cup and promotion to the MPFL Division 1.

== Teams ==
Team	Location	Stadium	Position in 2024	First season in MPFL
ATM	Kuala Lumpur	Sportizza Setapak & Arena Futsal FAM, Kelana Jaya	7th place	2022
(Kuala Lumpur) Canaan F.C.	Kuala Lumpur	Sportizza Setapak & Arena Futsal FAM, Kelana Jaya	6th place	2024
Kelantan FT	Kuala Lumpur	Sportizza Setapak & Arena Futsal FAM, Kelana Jaya	—	Debut
Kuala Lumpur 1	Kuala Lumpur	Sportizza Setapak & Arena Futsal FAM, Kelana Jaya	12th place	2019
Kuala Lumpur 2	Kuala Lumpur	Sportizza Setapak & Arena Futsal FAM, Kelana Jaya	—	Debut
Negeri Sembilan United F.C.	Kuala Lumpur	Sportizza Setapak & Arena Futsal FAM, Kelana Jaya	10th place	2024
(Negeri Sembilan) Nilai City S.C.	Kuala Lumpur	Sportizza Setapak & Arena Futsal FAM, Kelana Jaya	9th place	2024
Pahang Rangers B	Kuala Lumpur	Sportizza Setapak & Arena Futsal FAM, Kelana Jaya	—	Debut
PFA Odin Sarawak	Kuala Lumpur	Sportizza Setapak & Arena Futsal FAM, Kelana Jaya	5th place	2023
(Selangor) PJ Champz F.C.	Kuala Lumpur	Sportizza Setapak & Arena Futsal FAM, Kelana Jaya	8th place	2024
Penang	Kuala Lumpur	Sportizza Setapak & Arena Futsal FAM, Kelana Jaya	3rd place	2019
Terengganu	Kuala Lumpur	Sportizza Setapak & Arena Futsal FAM, Kelana Jaya	7th place	2024
(Kelantan) USMKK F.C.	Kuala Lumpur	Sportizza Setapak & Arena Futsal FAM, Kelana Jaya	—	Debut

== Results ==
Season	Winners	Runners-up	Third place
2024	Kelantan	Kedah	Penang
2025	(Kelantan) USMKK	Terengganu	PFA Odin Sarawak

== Titles by team ==
Team	Winners	Runners-up
Kelantan	1 (2024)	—N/a
(Kelantan) USMKK	1 (2025)	—N/a
Kedah	—N/a	1 (2024)
Terengganu	—N/a	1 (2025)

== Awards ==
=== Prize money ===
As of 2024 season

- Champion: RM 25,000
- Runner-up: RM 10,000
- Top goalscorer: RM 2,000
- Most valuable player: RM 1,000
- Best goalkeeper: RM 1,000

=== Top goalscorers ===
Season	Player	Team	Goals
2024	(Thailand) Ridwan Awaebuesa	Nilai City	16
2025	(Malaysia) Asyraff Zakaris	PFA Odin Sarawak	16

== See also ==
- Football in Malaysia
- Malaysia national futsal team
