= Kg. Rawa-Butterworth Rangers F.C. =

Malaysian football club based in Penang

Kg. Rawa-Butterworth Rangers
- Full name: Kampung Rawa-Butterworth Rangers Football Club
- Nickname: KR-Rangers
- Founded: 2021; 5 years ago, as Butterworth Rangers FC; 2026; 0 years ago, as Kg. Rawa-Butterworth Rangers FC
- Ground: Bertam Mini Stadium, Kepala Batas, Penang
- Capacity: 1,500
- Chairman: Vivantiran Parameshwara
- Head coach: Zabidi Othman
- League: Malaysia A2 Amateur League
- 2026–27: TBA

Kampung Rawa-Butterworth Rangers Football Club (commonly known as Kg. Rawa-Butterworth Rangers) is a Malaysian football club based in Penang. Formed through a strategic partnership between Kampung Rawa Football Club and Butterworth Rangers Football Club, the club competes in the Malaysia A2 Amateur League, the third tier of the Malaysian football league system.

== History ==
=== Parent clubs ===
The entity traces its roots to two prominent community clubs operating within the Football Association of Penang (FAP) ecosystem:

- Kampung Rawa F.C. Based in George Town, Penang, Kampung Rawa established itself as a competitive force in state-level amateur football during the early 2020s. The club captured back-to-back FAP Piala Sumbangsih (Charity Shield) titles in 2022 and 2023, alongside the FAP Division 1 in the 2022–23 season.
- Butterworth Rangers F.C. Operating out of Butterworth on the Penang mainland (Seberang Perai), with training operations at Padang Sekolah Rendah St. Mark. Butterworth Rangers won the Liga FAP Division 3 title in 2022 and secured the PIFA Challenge Trophy in 2026.

=== 2026 merger and national entry ===
Ahead of the 2026–27 Malaysian football season, Kampung Rawa F.C. and Butterworth Rangers F.C. combined their administrative and playing resources under the Kg. Rawa–Butterworth Rangers banner. The club was officially admitted by the AFL, joining the 18-club 2026–27 Malaysia A2 Amateur League.

== Team image ==
=== Crests and colours ===
Kg. Rawa logo

Butterworth Rangers logo

== Involvement in Malaysian football ==
=== State and regional competitions ===
Prior to entering the national pyramid, both parent clubs maintained active participation across Penang and northern Malaysian tournaments:

- Penang State leagues: Regular competitors across the Football Association of Penang (FAP) league divisions and local district competitions such as Liga Bagan.
- Regional tournaments: Participation in northern interstate cup competitions, including the PBMK Kedah League and the PIFA Challenge Trophy.
- National Indian football: In 2024, Butterworth Rangers represented the state of Perlis in the Bardhan Cup, a national tournament for Indian football teams across Malaysia.

=== National league ===
In the 2026–27 season, Kg. Rawa–Butterworth Rangers was placed in Zon Utara (Northern Zone) of the Malaysia A2 Amateur League, competing against Perak FA II, Kuala Perlis Titans, and Star City U-20.

=== Youth development ===
Through the Butterworth Rangers Football Academy, the club operates structured grassroots training programs for youth players across multiple ages (U-8 through U-18). Its youth setup won the MIFA National U-14 championship in 2024.

== Stadium ==
Kg. Rawa-Butterworth Rangers plays its home matches at Bertam Mini Stadium, located in Kepala Batas, North Seberang Perai District, Penang. Training sessions for its youth academy and developmental squads are primarily hosted at Padang Sekolah Rendah St. Mark in Butterworth.

== Players ==
=== Current squad ===
As of 13 November 2026

Note: Flags indicate national team as defined under FIFA eligibility rules; some limited exceptions apply. Players may hold more than one non-FIFA nationality.

No.	Pos.	Nation	Player
1	GK	MAS	Bharath Jayakumar (captain)
2	DF	MAS	Sukri Hamid
3	DF	MAS	Sharvin Subramaniam
4	DF	MAS	Ragaventhiran Suthagar
5	FW	MAS	Muhammad Chairil Ismail
5	MF	MAS	Dineshwaran S. Puvanesvaran
6	FW	MAS	Liinesh Raaj Sivaprakash
7	DF	MAS	Ahmad Azri Al Nafi'
8	MF	MAS	Thinusean Pillai Ravindran
9	MF	MAS	Syahmi Mohd Nasir
10	MF	MAS	Aidil Danial Izhar
11	DF	MAS	Mujibur Rahman Ahmad Zaki
14	MF	MAS	Deehban Sangar
15	DF	MAS	Youwarasan Maniom

No.	Pos.	Nation	Player
16	MF	MAS	Ahmad Irfan Mohd Noor
17	MF	MAS	Syamil Azrie Anuar
18	MF	MAS	Faris Humaidi Hussaini
20	MF	MAS	Sharvin Prem
22	GK	MAS	Daniell Hakimi Marzuki
23	DF	MAS	Ranesh
24	DF	MAS	Danush Krishnakumar
25	DF	MAS	Hariswaran Haridas
26	DF	MAS	Yuvaraj Manivannan
27	FW	MAS	Barry Jonah Thamil Chelvan
28	DF	MAS	Haziq Fikri Mohd Nizam
30	GK	MAS	Syahiran Saiful Azman
30	MF	MAS	Mohd Syukur Saidin
32	MF	MAS	Al-Hafiz Harun
40	MF	MAS	Adi Qayyum bin Salim

== Management ==
Position	Name
Team manager	(Malaysia) Vivantiran Parameshwara
Head coach	(Malaysia) Zabidi Othman
Assistant coach	(Malaysia) Amir Shahrul Ishak
Goalkeeper coach	(Malaysia) Sharizal Bin Hassan
Team media	(Malaysia) Mohd Sukri bin Othman
Kitman	(Malaysia) Munusamy a/l Ratnasamy

== Honours ==
Includes honours won by parent clubs Kampung Rawa F.C. and Butterworth Rangers F.C.

=== Senior ===
- FAP Division 1
  - Winners (1): 2022–23 (as Kampung Rawa F.C.)
- FAP Piala Sumbangsih
  - Winners (2): 2022, 2023 (as Kampung Rawa F.C.)
- Liga FAP Division 3
  - Winners (1): 2022 (as Butterworth Rangers F.C.)
- PIFA Challenge Trophy
  - Winners (1): 2026 (as Butterworth Rangers F.C.)

=== Youth ===
- MIFA National U-14
  - Winners (1): 2024 (as Butterworth Rangers F.C.)
