= Ramadhan Hamid =

Malaysian footballer

Personal information
- Full name: Mohamad Ramadhan bin Ab. Hamid
- Date of birth: 16 February 1994 (age 32)
- Place of birth: Kelantan, Malaysia
- Height: 1.85 m (6 ft 1 in)
- Position: Goalkeeper

Team information
- Current team: Penang
- Number: 22

Youth career
- 2012: Kelantan U21

Senior career*
Years	Team	Apps	(Gls)
2013–2015	Harimau Muda B	16	(0)
2015	Harimau Muda	10	(0)
2016–2018	Kelantan	11	(0)
2018–2019	Kedah Darul Aman	9	(0)
2020	Penang	0	(0)
2021	Kelantan United	5	(0)
2022	UiTM	12	(0)
2023	PDRM	15	(0)
2024–2025	Perak	7	(0)
2025–	Penang	14	(0)

International career^{‡}
2013–2015	Malaysia U22	0	(0)
2015	Malaysia	0	(0)
- * Club domestic league appearances and goals as of 3 May 2026 ‡ National team caps and goals as of 22 July 2024

Mohamad Ramadhan bin Ab. Hamid (born 16 February 1994) is a Malaysian professional footballer who plays as a goalkeeper for Malaysia Super League club Penang.

== Club career ==
=== Youth teams ===
Ramadhan began his career with Kelantan youth team in 2012 at the age of 18. In 2013, Ramadhan moved to Malaysia U21 club Harimau Muda B on loan deal and has played for Singaporean league, S.League. He made his S.League debut on 26 June 2013, playing the full 90 minutes in a 2–0 loss to Geylang International at the Bedok Stadium. Ramadhan has made 4 appearances and 10 unused substitute during his season debut.

=== Kelantan ===
On 25 November 2015, Ramadhan returned to Kelantan after disbanded of the Harimau Muda. Upon joining the club, Ramadhan was given a number one shirt last wore by Syazwan Yusoff during 2015 season before he loaned out to Melaka United in 2016 season. Ramadhan did not make any appearances during his first season with Kelantan and spent the entire season sitting on the bench became the second choice goalkeeper after Khairul Fahmi Che Mat. On 1 March 2017, Ramadhan made his debut playing against Perak during league match in Perak Stadium. He conceded 2 goals and the match end up Kelantan won by 4–2.

On 4 March 2017, Ramadhan made his Kelantan's home debut in Sultan Muhammad IV Stadium playing against Kuala Terengganu based club, T-Team. He made it to the first eleven and helped his team clinch their first home victory with 4−2 score.

On 5 July 2017, made his debut for during the first match of the Malaysia Cup campaign playing against UiTM in their home ground. Kelantan won by 3–1 during that match.

On 11 November 2017, Ramadhan has been announced to remain seasonally with Kelantan for the 2018 season. This time around he were given jersey number 22. Ramadhan played in first league match for Kelantan in 2–1 defeat to Melaka United on 3 February 2018.

=== Kedah ===
After losing his position as first choice goalkeeper under new coach Fajr Ibrahim, Ramadhan joined Kedah in May 2018. Ramadhan made his debut for Kedah in a 1–0 win over Kelantan on 8 June 2018.

=== Penang, Kelantan United and UiTM ===
He later signed for Penang F.C. for the 2020 season, before returning to Kelantan to play for Kelantan United F.C. for the 2021 season. Ramadhan changed teams again the following season, this time joining UiTM FC for the 2022 season.

=== Penang ===
On 1 July 2025, Ramadhan return and signed for Malaysia Super League club Penang after leaving Perak on a free transfer.

== International career ==
=== Malaysia ===
On 7 September 2015, Ramadhan was selected to represent Malaysia at the 2018 FIFA World Cup qualification match against Saudi Arabia. Somehow, he only spent time on the bench during the match.

== Career statistics ==
=== Club ===
As of match played 20 June 2025

Club	Season	League			Cup^{1}		League Cup^{2}		Others^{3}		Total	
Club	Season	Division	Apps	Goals	Apps	Goals	Apps	Goals	Apps	Goals	Apps	Goals
Harimau Muda B	2013	S.League	4	0	0	0	3	0	–		7	0
Harimau Muda B	2014	S.League	12	0	1	0	0	0	–		13	0
Harimau Muda B	2015	S.League	0	0	0	0	0	0	–		0	0
Harimau Muda B	Total		16	0	1	0	3	0	–		20	0
Harimau Muda	2015	S.League	10	0	0	0	0	0	–		10	0
Harimau Muda	Total		10	0	0	0	0	0	–		10	0
Kelantan	2016	Malaysia Super League	0	0	0	0	0	0	–		0	0
Kelantan	2017	Malaysia Super League	10	0	0	0	5	0	–		15	0
Kelantan	2018	Malaysia Super League	1	0	0	0	0	0	–		1	0
Kelantan	Total		11	0	0	0	5	0	–		16	0
Kedah Darul Aman	2018	Malaysia Super League	8	0	0	0	2	0	–		10	0
Kedah Darul Aman	2019	Malaysia Super League	1	0	1	0	0	0	–		2	0
Kedah Darul Aman	Total		9	0	1	0	2	0	–		12	0
Penang	2020	Malaysia Premier League	0	0	0	0	0	0	–		0	0
Penang	Total		0	0	0	0	0	0	–		0	0
Kelantan United	2021	Malaysia Premier League	5	0	–		1	0	–		6	0
Kelantan United	Total		5	0	–		1	0	–		6	0
UiTM	2022	Malaysia Premier League	12	0	–		0	0	–		12	0
UiTM	Total		12	0	–		0	0	–		12	0
PDRM	2023	Malaysia Super League	15	0	0	0	2	0	5	0	22	0
PDRM	Total		15	0	0	0	2	0	5	0	22	0
Perak	2024–25	Malaysia Super League	7	0	1	0	3	0	–		11	0
Perak	Total		7	0	1	0	3	0	–		11	0
Penang	2025–26	Malaysia Super League	5	0	0	0	1	0	0	0	6	0
Penang	Total		5	0	0	0	1	0	0	0	6	0
Career total			90	0	3	0	17	0	5	0	115	0

^{1} Includes Malaysia FA Cup and Singapore Cup matches.
^{2} Includes Malaysia Cup and Singapore League Cup matches.
^{3} Includes MFL Challenge Cup matches.

== Honours ==
Kedah Darul Aman

- Malaysia FA Cup: 2019
- Malaysia Cup runner-up: 2019

Penang

- Malaysia Premier League: 2020
- MFL Challenge Cup runner-up: 2026
