= CCCP-KDN F.C. =

CCCP-KDN
- Full name: Cheras Perdana Football Club-Kementerian Dalam Negeri
- Short name: CCCP-KDN
- Founded: 2020; 6 years ago as Kelab Sukan dan Rekreasi Cheras Perdana
- Stadium: Kuala Lumpur Sports Arena, Setapak
- Capacity: 1,000
- Owner: Ministry of Home Affairs (Malaysia)
- Head coach: Anuar bin Udin
- League: Malaysia A2 Amateur League
- 2026–27: TBA

Cheras Perdana Football Club-Kementerian Dalam Negeri, commonly referred to as CCCP KDN FC, is a Malaysian football club registered under Kuala Lumpur and based in the Klang Valley. The club competes in the Malaysia A2 Amateur League, the third tier of the Malaysian football league system, organized by the Amateur Football League (AFL).

== History ==
=== Grassroots origins (2020–2025) ===
The club traces its origins to Cheras Perdana Football Club (CCCP), operating under the Kelab Sukan dan Rekreasi Cheras Perdana, which was established around 2020 in Cheras Perdana, Selangor. Initially formed as a community sports and recreation body, the club focused on neighborhood football development, youth engagement, and organizing local grassroots tournaments such as the Liga Persahabatan CCCP across the Klang Valley.

=== Institutional partnership and national debut (2026–present) ===
To compete at the national amateur level, the community club formed a joint entity with the sports club of Malaysia's Ministry of Home Affairs (Kelab Kementerian Dalam Negeri, abbreviated as KDN), officially registering as Cheras Perdana Football Club (CCCP)-KDN under Kuala Lumpur.

In November 2026, the Amateur Football League (AFL) confirmed CCCP KDN FC as one of eight new debutant clubs admitted into the expanded 2026–27 Malaysia A2 Amateur League season, which kicked off on 14 November.

Competing in tier 3 of the Malaysian football pyramid, CCCP KDN FC was drawn into the Central Zone (Zon Tengah) for the 2026–27 Malaysia A2 Amateur League. In the zonal group stage, the club has competed against regional counterparts including ACeIO, JDT Academy, Kampong Ku and Sungai Merab.

=== Identity and disambiguation ===
Despite sharing the "KDN" abbreviation, CCCP KDN FC has no affiliation with Kelantan Darul Naim F.C. (the professional Kota Bharu-based club that competed in the Malaysia Super League under the acronym KDN FC prior to rebranding as Kelantan The Real Warriors in 2025).

== Players ==
=== Current squad ===
As of 13 November 2026

Note: Flags indicate national team as defined under FIFA eligibility rules; some limited exceptions apply. Players may hold more than one non-FIFA nationality.

No.	Pos.	Nation	Player
4	MF	MAS	Ahmad Nizam Mohd Rozi (captain)
5	DF	MAS	Wan Arfan Wan Ibrahim
7	MF	MAS	Irfan Fazail
12	MF	MAS	Nor Saiful Zaini
16	DF	MAS	Syafiq Azmi
19	DF	MAS	Amir Saiful Badeli
20	GK	MAS	Asri Muhamad
21	MF	MAS	Mohd Khairol Abedol Latif
22	MF	MAS	Asri Ismail
26	GK	MAS	Aidil Syazrin Mohd Rapi
27	DF	MAS	Iskandar Ismail
28	MF	MAS	Haziq Hafiz Hidrus
29	MF	MAS	Zahin Raimi Zamani
30	GK	MAS	Fakhrul Ikram Azahari

No.	Pos.	Nation	Player
32	DF	MAS	Safiee Ahmad
35	DF	MAS	Che Mohamad Safwan Hazman
36	DF	MAS	Afiq Azuan
37	MF	MAS	Safwan Samsol
38	DF	MAS	Rafie Kamaruzzaman
41	GK	MAS	Zifri Haiqal Abdul Waha
44	DF	MAS	Raja Mohamad Shahrulnizam
47	MF	MAS	Dick Cheney Waili
50	GK	MAS	Willfred Jabun
55	DF	MAS	Hafif Jazimin Harun
76	MF	MAS	Amirul Waie Ya'acob

== Management ==
Position	Name
Team manager	(Malaysia) Muhammad Faizal bin Basarom
Head coach	(Malaysia) Anuar bin Udin
Assistant coach	(Malaysia) Allmahdi Umar bin Ahmad Juffri
Goalkeeper coach	(Malaysia) Mohd Atfan bin Hat
Fitness coach	(Malaysia) Mohd Kamil bin Noordin
Physio	(Malaysia) Nik Mohd Jefry
Kitman	(Malaysia) Muhamad Amirul bin Abas
