= Negeri Sembilan United F.C. =

Negeri Sembilan United
- Full name: Negeri Sembilan United Football Club
- Short name: NSU
- Founded: 2019; 7 years ago
- Head coach: Ahmad Fawzul Hadzir Mohamad
- League: Malaysia A3 Community League
- 2025–26: TBD
Home colours	Away colours

Negeri Sembilan United Football Club is a professional football club based in Seremban, Negeri Sembilan, Malaysia, competing in the Malaysia Premier Futsal League (MPFL) Division 2 the nation's second-tier futsal competition and football squad also play at Malaysia A3 Community League. Established in 2019, NSU Futsal emphasizes developing local talent, representing the spirit and passion of Negeri Sembilan at the national futsal scene.

== History ==
NSU Futsal made its debut in the 2024 season, finishing 10th in the league standings. In preparation for the 2025 season, NSU Futsal participated in a preseason friendly match against Johor Darul Ta'zim, where they were defeated with the score of 0–4.

Their football squad played in the revamped 2025–26 Negeri Sembilan Premier League.

== Current squad ==
As of 21 May 2025

#	Position	Name	Nationality
1	GK	Adib Haikal Bin Anuar	(Malaysia)
20	GK	Muhamad Fairezuan Rozil	(Malaysia)
4	MF	Azizul Haziq Bin Azhar Azhar Arshad	(Malaysia)
5	DF	Muhammad Daniel Haikal Samsudin	(Malaysia)
6	MF	Muhammad Idham Yahaya	(Malaysia)
7	DF	Ahmad Aizat Hanafi Mohamad	(Malaysia)
8	FW	Mohd Arif Afiki Muhamad	(Malaysia)
9	DF	Putra Hazrick Aiman Hemsani	(Malaysia)
10	FW	Ahmad Hambal Sara'i	(Malaysia)
11	MF	Muhammad Amirul Aiman Abdullah	(Malaysia)
14	DF	Raja Izzat Sallehuddin Raja Nazrihisham	(Malaysia)
15	MF	Muhammad Farish Danial Mohd Adham	(Malaysia)
16	MF	Muhammad Shahir Azizi Husaini	(Malaysia)
17	MF	Fitri Bin Sahrani	(Malaysia)
18	FW	Marwan Bin Rosli	(Malaysia)
19	FW	Aliff Iman Bin Hisyamudin	(Malaysia)
18	MF	Muhammad Naqib Bin Shukri	(Malaysia)
23	FW	Ahmad Farid Bin Azahar	(Malaysia)
25	MF	Nuraiman Zafry Bin Zahid	(Malaysia)
30	MF	Izzat Bin Rizal	(Malaysia)
33	GK	Amar Izzudin	(Malaysia)

== Club officials ==
As of 21 May 2025

Position	Name
Team manager	(Malaysia) Amirul Shafwan Mohd Shahril
Head coach	(Malaysia) Ahmad Fawzul Hadzir Mohamad
Assistant coach	(Malaysia) Aidil Idruan Idris
Physiotherapist	(Malaysia) Muhammad Afiq Jeffry
Team coordinator	(Malaysia) Najib Ashraf Zolkiply
Kitman	(Malaysia) Mohamed Fauzi Mahmood

== See also ==
- Negeri Sembilan Football Association
