= PFA Odin Sarawak F.C. =

PFA Odin Sarawak
- Full name: PFA Odin Sarawak Futsal Club
- Short name: PFA
- Founded: 2023; 3 years ago
- Head coach: Mohd Faizal Zamri
- League: MPFL Division 2
Home colours	Away colours

PFA Odin Sarawak Futsal Club is a professional futsal club based in Kuching, Sarawak, Malaysia, competing in the Malaysia Premier Futsal League (MPFL) Division 2.

== History ==
In their debut MPFL season in 2023, PFA Odin Sarawak suffered heavy defeats against powerhouse teams like Johor Darul Ta'zim (JDT), losing 3–8 in an away match and 1–11 at home. Their under-16 team clinched second place in the Milo Hidup Bola Futsal Carnival and won the SAMArindok Futsal AKYBMS tournament.

== Club officials ==
As of 21 May 2025

Position	Name
President	(Malaysia) Hamzah Ismail
Deputy president	(Malaysia) Zambia Gobel
Team manager	(Malaysia) Nurhazli Mamena Mohamad
Head coach	(Malaysia) Mohd Faizal Zamri
Assistant coach	(Malaysia) Aliff Morshidi
Goalkeeper coach	(Malaysia) Mohamad Fadzillah Ismail
Fitness coach	(Malaysia) Zamri Amat
Physiotherapist	(Malaysia) Muhamad Safuan Abdul Halim
