= Safiee Ahmad =

Malaysian footballer

Personal information
- Full name: Mohd Safiee bin Ahmad
- Date of birth: 29 April 1997 (age 29)
- Place of birth: Sarawak, Malaysia
- Height: 1.73 m (5 ft 8 in)
- Position: Midfielder

Team information
- Current team: CCCP-KDN
- Number: 32

Youth career
- 2015: PDRM U21

Senior career*
Years	Team	Apps	(Gls)
2016–26	PDRM	55	(0)
2026–	CCCP-KDN	0	(0)

International career
- Malaysia
- * Club domestic league appearances and goals as of 18 August 2025

Mohd Safiee bin Ahmad (born 29 April 1997) is a Malaysian footballer who plays for Malaysia Super League club PDRM as a midfielder.
