= 2025–26 Negeri Sembilan Premier League =

Negeri Sembilan Premier League
- Season: 2025–26
- Champions: TH-KR FC II
- Promoted: MPPD; Seremban United
- Top goalscorer: Muhammad Zulfikar (Negeri Sembilan Utd., 12 goals)
- Biggest home win: YNS FC 8–1 Flamingo (21 June 2026)
- Biggest away win: Lakai 1–9 MPPD (16 June 2026)
- Highest scoring: 10 goals Lakai 1–9 MPPD (16 June 2026)
- All statistics correct as of 21 June 2026.

The 2025–26 Negeri Sembilan Premier League (LPNS), officially known as the BubblesO2 Liga Premier Negeri Sembilan, the top-tier football league in Negeri Sembilan, was relaunched on April 5, 2026 by the Negeri Sembilan Football Association (PBNS). This marks the league's return after a five-year hiatus, under the Malaysia A3 Community League. A total of 20 teams competes.

== Competition format ==
The league features 20 teams and approximately 600 players from across Negeri Sembilan. Teams are divided into groups for the league stage single round-robin format. Top four from each group qualify to the knock-out stage. The winner will qualify for the Malaysia A2 Amateur League. Each team is allowed to register one import player.

== Teams ==
The following teams participated in the 2025–26 Negeri Sembilan Premier League.

Group A

- Flizzie FC
- NS Indian Association
- Negeri Sembilan United
- NS Forces Warriors II
- Randuk United
- Seremban City
- Seremban United
- TAFT FC
- TH-KR FC II
- Thivy Jaya Sports Club

Group B

- Chembong
- Flamingo
- Jalor
- Jempol Dreams
- Lakai FC
- MBS FC
- MPPD
- N Nine
- Tampoi
- YNS FC

=== Locations ===
Negeri Sembilan

== League table ==
=== Group A ===
Pos	Team	Pld	W	D	L	GF	GA	GD	Pts	Promotion, qualification or relegation
1	TH-KR FC II	9	9	0	0	40	2	+38	27	Advance to Knock-out stage
2	Seremban United	9	6	2	1	30	10	+20	20	Advance to Knock-out stage
3	Negeri Sembilan United	9	5	2	2	23	10	+13	17	Advance to Knock-out stage
4	NS Forces Warriors II	9	4	3	2	20	12	+8	15	Advance to Knock-out stage
5	Flizzie FC	9	5	0	4	18	22	−4	15	
6	TAFT	9	2	3	4	6	17	−11	9	
7	Randuk United	9	1	4	4	10	15	−5	7	
8	NS Indian Association	9	2	1	6	6	35	−29	7	
9	Seremban City	9	2	0	7	8	26	−18	6	
10	Thivy Jaya Sports Club	9	1	1	7	19	31	−12	4	

Updated to match(es) played on 28 June 2026. Source: Persatuan Bolasepak Negeri Sembilan - PBNS
Rules for classification: 1) Points; 2) Goal difference; 3) Number of goals scored.

=== Group B ===
Pos	Team	Pld	W	D	L	GF	GA	GD	Pts	Promotion, qualification or relegation
1	Jempol Dreams	9	7	1	1	18	14	+4	22	Advance to Knock-out stage
2	N Nine	9	5	3	1	23	7	+16	18	Advance to Knock-out stage
3	MPPD	9	5	2	2	22	10	+12	17	Advance to Knock-out stage
4	YNS FC	9	5	1	3	25	10	+15	16	Advance to Knock-out stage
5	Tampoi	9	5	1	3	23	10	+13	16	
6	Jalor	9	4	3	2	17	16	+1	15	
7	MBS FC	9	3	2	4	21	14	+7	11	
8	Chembong	9	2	3	4	13	9	+4	9	
9	Lakai FC	9	0	1	8	3	33	−30	1	
10	Flamingo	9	0	1	8	4	46	−42	1	

Updated to match(es) played on 30 June 2025. Source: Persatuan Bolasepak Negeri Sembilan - PBNS
Rules for classification: 1) Points; 2) Goal difference; 3) Number of goals scored.

== League matches ==
Matchdays

=== Matchweek 1 ===
5 April 2026	TAFT	1–1	NS Indian Association	Seremban
17:00 UTC+8		Report		Stadium: PBNS BubblesO2 Arena

5 April 2026	TH-KR II	4–0	NS Forces Warriors	Seremban
20:00 UTC+8		Report		Stadium: PBNS BubblesO2 Arena

5 April 2026	Seremban United	3–1	Flizzie	Seremban
22:00 UTC+8		Report		Stadium: PBNS BubblesO2 Arena

6 April 2026	Seremban City	1–4	Randuk United	Seremban
20:00 UTC+8		Report		Stadium: PBNS BubblesO2 Arena

6 April 2026	Jalor	0–4	Tampoi	Seremban
22:00 UTC+8		Report		Stadium: PBNS BubblesO2 Arena

7 April 2026	Lakai	0–1	Jempol Dreams	Seremban
20:00 UTC+8		Report		Stadium: PBNS BubblesO2 Arena

7 April 2026	N Nine	7–0	Flamingo	Seremban
22:00 UTC+8		Report		Stadium: PBNS BubblesO2 Arena

=== Matchweek 2 ===
12 April 2026	MPPD	1–0	YNS	Seremban
17:00 UTC+8		Report		Stadium: PBNS BubblesO2 Arena

12 April 2026	MBS	0–0	Chembong	Seremban
20:00 UTC+8		Report		Stadium: PBNS BubblesO2 Arena

12 April 2026	Jempol Dreams	3–1	Jalor	Seremban
22:00 UTC+8		Report		Stadium: PBNS BubblesO2 Arena

13 April 2026	Tampoi	7–0	Flamingo	Seremban
20:00 UTC+8		Report		Stadium: PBNS BubblesO2 Arena

13 April 2026	Thivy Jaya	1–3	Negeri Sembilan United	Seremban
22:00 UTC+8		Report		Stadium: PBNS BubblesO2 Arena

14 April 2026	NS Forces Warriors	2–0	TAFT	Seremban
20:00 UTC+8		Report		Stadium: PBNS BubblesO2 Arena

14 April 2026	NS Indian Association	0–1	Flizzie	Seremban
22:00 UTC+8		Report		Stadium: PBNS BubblesO2 Arena

=== Matchweek 3 ===
19 April 2026	Randuk United	0–4	TH-KR FC II	Seremban
17:00 UTC+8		Report		Stadium: PBNS BubblesO2 Arena

19 April 2026	Negeri Sembilan United	1–3	Seremban United	Seremban
20:00 UTC+8		Report		Stadium: PBNS BubblesO2 Arena

19 April 2026	Seremban City	3–1	Thivy Jaya	Seremban
22:00 UTC+8		Report		Stadium: PBNS BubblesO2 Arena

20 April 2026	Flizzie	0–2	TAFT	Seremban
20:00 UTC+8		Report		Stadium: PBNS BubblesO2 Arena

20 April 2026	YNS FC	2–0	Lakai	Seremban
22:00 UTC+8		Report		Stadium: PBNS BubblesO2 Arena

21 April 2026	Chembong	1–1	N Nine	Seremban
20:00 UTC+8		Report		Stadium: PBNS BubblesO2 Arena

21 April 2026	MPPD	1–3	MBS FC	Seremban
22:00 UTC+8		Report		Stadium: PBNS BubblesO2 Arena

=== Matchweek 4 ===
26 April 2026	Flamingo	2–4	Jalor	Seremban
17:00 UTC+8		Report		Stadium: PBNS BubblesO2 Arena

26 April 2026	Jempol Dreams	1–6	YNS FC	Seremban
20:00 UTC+8		Report		Stadium: PBNS BubblesO2 Arena

26 April 2026	Tampoi	1–0	Chembong	Seremban
22:00 UTC+8		Report		Stadium: PBNS BubblesO2 Arena

27 April 2026	Lakai	0–3	MBS FC	Seremban
20:00 UTC+8		Report		Stadium: PBNS BubblesO2 Arena

27 April 2026	NS Forces Warriors II	0–0	Randuk United	Seremban
22:00 UTC+8		Report		Stadium: PBNS BubblesO2 Arena

28 April 2026	NS Indian Association	0–6	Negeri Sembilan United	Seremban
20:00 UTC+8		Report		Stadium: PBNS BubblesO2 Arena

28 April 2026	TH-KR FC II	4–0	Thivy Jaya Sports Club	Seremban
22:00 UTC+8		Report		Stadium: PBNS BubblesO2 Arena

=== Matchweek 5 ===
3 May 2026	Negeri Sembilan United	4–0	Flizzie FC	Seremban
17:00 UTC+8		Report		Stadium: PBNS BubblesO2 Arena

3 May 2026	Seremban United	3–1	Seremban City	Seremban
20:00 UTC+8		Report		Stadium: PBNS BubblesO2 Arena

3 May 2026	TAFT FC	0–0	Randuk United	Seremban
22:00 UTC+8		Report		Stadium: PBNS BubblesO2 Arena

4 May 2026	Thivy Jaya Sports Club	2–5	NS Forces Warriors II	Seremban
20:00 UTC+8		Report		Stadium: PBNS BubblesO2 Arena

4 May 2026	N Nine	2–1	MPPD	Seremban
22:00 UTC+8		Report		Stadium: PBNS BubblesO2 Arena

5 May 2026	Jalor	3–2	YNS FC	Seremban
20:00 UTC+8		Report		Stadium: PBNS BubblesO2 Arena

5 May 2026	Chembong	7–0	Flamingo	Seremban
22:00 UTC+8		Report		Stadium: PBNS BubblesO2 Arena

=== Matchweek 6 ===
10 May 2026	MBS FC	3–4	Jempol Dreams	Seremban
17:00 UTC+8		Report		Stadium: PBNS BubblesO2 Arena

10 May 2026	MPPD	1–0	Tampoi	Seremban
20:00 UTC+8		Report		Stadium: PBNS BubblesO2 Arena

10 May 2026	Lakai	0–7	N Nine	Seremban
22:00 UTC+8		Report		Stadium: PBNS BubblesO2 Arena

11 May 2026	Jalor	2–2	Chembong	Seremban
20:00 UTC+8		Report		Stadium: PBNS BubblesO2 Arena

11 May 2026	Seremban City	1–2	NS Indian Association	Seremban
22:00 UTC+8		Report		Stadium: PBNS BubblesO2 Arena

12 May 2026	TH-KR FC II	2–1	Seremban United	Seremban
20:00 UTC+8		Report		Stadium: PBNS BubblesO2 Arena

12 May 2026	TAFT FC	0–0	Negeri Sembilan United	Seremban
22:00 UTC+8		Report		Stadium: PBNS BubblesO2 Arena

=== Matchweek 7 ===
17 May 2026	Randuk United	1–1	Thivy Jaya Sports Club	Seremban
17:00 UTC+8		Report		Stadium: PBNS BubblesO2 Arena

17 May 2026	Flizzie	4–0	Seremban City	Seremban
20:00 UTC+8		Report		Stadium: PBNS BubblesO2 Arena

17 May 2026	NS Forces Warriors II	1–1	Seremban United	Seremban
22:00 UTC+8		Report		Stadium: PBNS BubblesO2 Arena

18 May 2026	NS Indian Association	0–8	TH-KR FC II	Seremban
20:00 UTC+8		Report		Stadium: PBNS BubblesO2 Arena

18 May 2026	YNS FC	3–3	MBS FC	Seremban
22:00 UTC+8		Report		Stadium: PBNS BubblesO2 Arena

19 May 2026	Flamingo	0–4	MPPD	Seremban
20:00 UTC+8		Report		Stadium: PBNS BubblesO2 Arena

19 May 2026	Jempol Dreams	1–0	N Nine	Seremban
22:00 UTC+8		Report		Stadium: PBNS BubblesO2 Arena

=== Matchweek 8 ===
22 May 2026	Negeri Sembilan United	3–0	Seremban City	Seremban
20:00 UTC+8		Report		Stadium: PBNS BubblesO2 Arena

22 May 2026	Seremban United	1–1	Randuk United	Seremban
22:00 UTC+8		Report		Stadium: PBNS BubblesO2 Arena

24 May 2026	Tampoi	5–1	Lakai	Seremban
17:00 UTC+8		Report		Stadium: PBNS BubblesO2 Arena

24 May 2026	MBS FC	0–1	Jalor	Seremban
20:00 UTC+8		Report		Stadium: PBNS BubblesO2 Arena

24 May 2026	Chembong	0–1	MPPD FC	Seremban
22:00 UTC+8		Report		Stadium: PBNS BubblesO2 Arena

25 May 2026	N. Nine	1–0	YNS FC	Seremban
20:00 UTC+8		Report		Stadium: PBNS BubblesO2 Arena

25 May 2026	Thivy Jaya SC	2–1	TAFT	Seremban
22:00 UTC+8		Report		Stadium: PBNS BubblesO2 Arena

=== Matchweek 9 ===
31 May 2026	TH-KR II	7–0	Flizzie	Seremban
17:00 UTC+8				Stadium: PBNS BubblesO2 Arena

31 May 2026	NS Forces Warriors	3–0; Awarded (Note: The match was forfeited by NS Indian Association as the team failed to provide an adequate number of players.)	NS Indian Association	Seremban
20:00 UTC+8				Stadium: PBNS BubblesO2 Arena

31 May 2026	Seremban City	2–1	TAFT	Seremban
22:00 UTC+8				Stadium: PBNS BubblesO2 Arena

1 June 2026	Thivy Jaya	2–7	Seremban United	Seremban
20:00 UTC+8				Stadium: PBNS BubblesO2 Arena

1 June 2026	Lakai	1–1	Flamingo	Seremban
22:00 UTC+8				Stadium: PBNS BubblesO2 Arena

2 June 2026	Jempol Dreams	3–2	Tampoi	Seremban
20:00 UTC+8				Stadium: PBNS BubblesO2 Arena

2 June 2026	MPPD	2–2	Jalor	Seremban
22:00 UTC+8				Stadium: PBNS BubblesO2 Arena

=== Matchweek 10 ===
7 June 2026	MBS	1–2	N Nine	Seremban
17:00 UTC+8				Stadium: PBNS BubblesO2 Arena

7 June 2026	Chembong	2–0	Lakai	Seremban
20:00 UTC+8				Stadium: PBNS BubblesO2 Arena

7 June 2026	YNS	2–0	Tampoi	Seremban
22:00 UTC+8				Stadium: PBNS BubblesO2 Arena

8 June 2026	Flamingo	0–2	Jempol Dreams	Seremban
20:00 UTC+8				Stadium: PBNS BubblesO2 Arena

8 June 2026	Negeri Sembilan United	1–2	TH-KR II	Seremban
22:00 UTC+8				Stadium: PBNS BubblesO2 Arena

9 June 2026	Randuk United	1–2	NS Indian Association	Seremban
20:00 UTC+8				Stadium: PBNS BubblesO2 Arena

9 June 2026	Flizzie	3–2	NS Forces Warriors	Seremban
22:00 UTC+8				Stadium: PBNS BubblesO2 Arena

=== Matchweek 11 ===
14 June 2026	TAFT	0–5	Seremban United	Seremban
17:00 UTC+8				Stadium: PBNS BubblesO2 Arena

14 June 2026	NS Indian Association	0–8	Thivy Jaya	Seremban
20:00 UTC+8				Stadium: PBNS BubblesO2 Arena

14 June 2026	NS Forces Warriors II	2–2	Negeri Sembilan United	Seremban
22:00 UTC+8				Stadium: PBNS BubblesO2 Arena

15 June 2026	TH-KR FC II	3–0	Seremban City	Seremban
20:00 UTC+8				Stadium: PBNS BubblesO2 Arena

15 June 2026	Jalor	1–1	N-Nine	Seremban
22:00 UTC+8				Stadium: PBNS BubblesO2 Arena

16 June 2026	Lakai	1–9	MPPD	Seremban
20:00 UTC+8				Stadium: PBNS BubblesO2 Arena

16 June 2026	Tampoi	2–1	MBS	Seremban
22:00 UTC+8				Stadium: PBNS BubblesO2 Arena

=== Matchweek 12 ===
21 June 2026	Jempol Dreams	1–0	Chembong	Seremban
17:00 UTC+8		Report		Stadium: PBNS BubblesO2 Arena

21 June 2026	YNS FC	8–1	Flamingo	Seremban
20:00 UTC+8		Report		Stadium: PBNS BubblesO2 Arena

21 June 2026	Jalor	3–0	Lakai	Seremban
22:00 UTC+8		Report		Stadium: PBNS BubblesO2 Arena

22 June 2026	N. Nine FC	2–2	Tampoi FC	Seremban
20:00 UTC+8				Stadium: PBNS BubblesO2 Arena

22 June 2026	Randuk United	1–3	Flizzie FC	Seremban
22:00 UTC+8				Stadium: PBNS BubblesO2 Arena

23 June 2026	TAFT	0–6	TH-KR FC II	Seremban
20:00 UTC+8		Report		Stadium: PBNS BubblesO2 Arena

23 June 2026	Seremban United	6–1	NS Indian Association	Seremban
22:00 UTC+8		Report		Stadium: PBNS BubblesO2 Arena

=== Matchweek 13 ===
28 June 2026	Seremban City	0–5	NS Forces Warriors II	Seremban
17:00 UTC+8		Report		Stadium: PBNS BubblesO2 Arena

28 June 2026	Flizzie FC	6–3	Thivy Jaya	Seremban
20:00 UTC+8		Report		Stadium: PBNS BubblesO2 Arena

28 June 2026	Negeri Sembilan United	3–2	Randuk United	Seremban
22:00 UTC+8		Report		Stadium: PBNS BubblesO2 Arena

29 June 2026	MPPD FC	2–2	Jempol Dreams	Seremban
20:00 UTC+8		Report		Stadium: PBNS BubblesO2 Arena

29 June 2026	Flamingo FC	0–6	MBS FC	Seremban
22:00 UTC+8		Report		Stadium: PBNS BubblesO2 Arena

30 June 2026	Chembong FC	0–2	YNS FC	Seremban
20:00 UTC+8		Report		Stadium: PBNS BubblesO2 Arena

== Knock-out stage ==
Quarterfinals
TH-KR FC II	3
YNS FC	0
N Nine	2
Negeri Sembilan United	0
Jempol Dreams	2 (5)
NS Forces Warriors II	2 (4)
Seremban United	0
MPPD FC	1

Semifinals
TH-KR FC II	3
N Nine	1
Jempol Dreams	0 (6)
MPPD FC	0 (7)

Final
TH-KR FC II	5
MPPD	2
Third place play-off
N Nine	5 (7)
Jempol Dreams	5 (6)

=== Quarter-final ===
6 July 2026	TH-KR FC II	3–0	YNS FC	Seremban
20:00 UTC+8		Report		Stadium: PBNS BubblesO2 Arena

6 July 2026	Seremban United	0–1	MPPD	Seremban
22:30 UTC+8		Report		Stadium: PBNS BubblesO2 Arena

7 July 2026	Jempol Dreams	2–2 (5–4 p)	NS Forces Warriors II	Seremban
20:00 UTC+8		Report		Stadium: PBNS BubblesO2 Arena

7 July 2026	N Nine	2–0	Negeri Sembilan United	Seremban
22:30 UTC+8		Report		Stadium: PBNS BubblesO2 Arena

=== Semi-final ===
12 July 2026	Teck Hin-KR II	3–1	N Nine	Seremban
20:00 UTC+8		Report		Stadium: PBNS BubblesO2 Arena

12 July 2026	Jempol Dreams	0–0 (6–7 p)	MPPD FC	Seremban
22:30 UTC+8		Report		Stadium: PBNS BubblesO2 Arena

=== Match for third place ===
19 July 2026	N Nine	5–5 (7–6 p)	Jempol Dreams	Seremban
17:00 UTC+8		Report		Stadium: PBNS BubblesO2 Arena

=== Final ===
26 July 2026
16:15 UTC+8

TH-KR FC II	5–2	MPPD
	Report

Tampin Mini Stadium, Tampin

== Season statistics ==
=== Top goalscorers ===
As of 3 July 2026

Rank	Player	Team	Goals
1	(Malaysia) Muhammad Zulfikar	Negeri Sembilan United	14
2	(Malaysia) Md. Shahrul Asmadin	Seremban United	8
3	(Malaysia) Firdaus Azizul	TH-KR FC II	7
3	(Malaysia) S. Roshan	Thivy Jaya FC	7
3	(Malaysia) Idham Yahaya	YNS FC	7
6	(Malaysia) Arif Afiki	Flizzie FC	6
7	(Malaysia) Muhammad Faizal	N Nine FC	5
7	(Malaysia) Muhammad Aqib	N Nine FC	5
7	(Malaysia) Danish Fauzan	MPPD FC	5
7	(Malaysia) Shahrul Nizam	Seremban United	5
7	(Malaysia) Amir Firdaus	TH-KR FC II	5
7	(Malaysia) M. Devakumaran	Jempol Dreams	5
7	(Malaysia) Hasbullah Muhammad	MBS FC	5

== See also ==
- 2025–26 Malaysia A3 Community League
