= Seremban United F.C. =

Malaysian football club

PUSEN-Seremban United
- Full name: PUSEN-Seremban United Football Club
- Short name: PSUFC
- Founded: 2026; 0 years ago
- Ground: IRC Arena, Bandar Sri Sendayan, Negeri Sembilan
- Capacity: 1,000
- Head coach: Kaharuddin Rahman
- League: Malaysia A2 Amateur League
- 2026–27: TBA

PUSEN-Seremban United Football Club (often stylized as Seremban United FC or Pusen Seremban United FC) is a Malaysian football club based in Seremban, Negeri Sembilan. Founded in 2026, the club currently competes in the Liga A2 Amateur, the fourth tier of the Malaysian football league system. The club plays its home matches at the Tuanku Abdul Rahman Stadium in Paroi and IRC Arena Bandar Sri Sendayan.

== History ==
Seremban United FC was officially established in early 2026 to foster local football talent within the state of Negeri Sembilan. The club began its competitive journey by participating in regional amateur competitions, notably competing in group A of the local BubblesO2 Liga Premier Negeri Sembilan (the state's A3 League tier).

Following structural developments and strong regional performances, Seremban United was admitted into the Liga A2 Amateur for the 2026–27 season, marking its debut in the national-tier system managed by the Amateur Football League (AFL). In preparation for their inaugural Liga A2 campaign, the team underwent an intensive 11-match pre-season schedule. The pre-season window concluded on 3 November 2026 with a notable 0–0 draw against the reserve side of the state's primary professional club, Negeri Sembilan FC II (NSFC II).

=== Merger (2026) ===
In August 2026, Seremban United FC announced partnership with PUSEN Hornet. The Amateur Football League (AFL) officially approved the merger, allowing the club to enter the Liga A2 Amateur as PUSEN-Seremban United.

== Club identity and crest ==
Following the merger, the club combined the distinct branding of both parent outfits, integrating elements of Seremban United's brand with the traditional corporate ties of PUSEN (Pangkalan Udara Sendayan). Their traditional media and fan platforms often refer by their local moniker, Harimau Seremban (The Seremban Tigers).

== Stadium and infrastructure ==
The club shares the state's premier football facility, Tuanku Abdul Rahman Stadium. The multi-purpose stadium has a capacity of 45,000 spectators and serves as the venue for the club's A2 League fixtures.

== Players ==
=== Current squad ===
As of 14 November 2026

Note: Flags indicate national team as defined under FIFA eligibility rules; some limited exceptions apply. Players may hold more than one non-FIFA nationality.

No.	Pos.	Nation	Player
1	GK	MAS	Yohshansai Kirthen (captain)
3	FW	MAS	Hazwan Haziq Sufian
5	FW	MAS	Fitri Mohd Shukri
6	MF	MAS	Ariff Mohamad Nadzri
7	MF	MAS	Md Shahrul Asmadin
8	FW	MAS	Shahrul Nizam Ab Hamid
9	DF	MAS	Aniq Asyraf Tuah
10	MF	MAS	Adam Muzafar Shah Razali
11	GK	MAS	Azeem Farhan
12	DF	MAS	Amir Shaifulniza Johan
13	MF	MAS	Ridhwan Dul Fakar
14	DF	MAS	Raveendran Pillai
15	FW	MAS	Affendi Mohd Sofi
16	MF	MAS	Asraf Roslan

No.	Pos.	Nation	Player
17	FW	MAS	Thipenraj Gopal
18	MF	MAS	Farouq Adam Khan
19	DF	MAS	Aikmal Roslan
20	DF	MAS	Kamil Khamis
21	MF	MAS	S. Sivanyana Venthar
22	DF	MAS	M. Daneshwaren
23	DF	MAS	Nur Aiman Naqiuddin
24	FW	MAS	Zulfikar Zaharuddin
25	FW	MAS	Ibrahim Muhamat
26	DF	MAS	Ahmad Syafiq Nasaruddin
27	DF	MAS	Shukery Mohamad Hanafi
28	FW	MAS	Mathivaannan Rajan
29	DF	MAS	Danish Dylan Abdullah
33	GK	MAS	Mohd Izzuan Ikmal
77	GK	MAS	Hasbul Hadi Hanis

== Management ==
Position	Name
Team manager	(Malaysia) Premkumar a/l Nadarajan
Assistant manager	(Malaysia) Tengku Qayyum
Head coach	(Malaysia) Kaharuddin Rahman
Assistant coach	(Malaysia) Mohd Tarmizi Mahamed Hanifah
Goalkeeper coach	(Malaysia) Prakash a/l Balakrishnan
Fitness coach	(Malaysia) Mohd Kamil bin Ujang
Physio	(Malaysia) Muhamad Salihin bin Kamaruzaman
Team admin	(Malaysia) Mogana a/p Sellupillai (Malaysia) Nor Aziruddin bin Muhammad
Team media	(Malaysia) Hairiakmal bin Mustapha
Kitman	(Malaysia) Murule a/l Muniappan
