= Willfred Jabun =

Malaysian footballer

Personal information
- Full name: Willfred Anak Jabun
- Date of birth: 12 April 1989 (age 37)
- Place of birth: Sarawak, Malaysia
- Height: 1.70 m (5 ft 7 in)
- Position: Goalkeeper

Team information
- Current team: CCCP-KDN
- Number: 50

Senior career*
Years	Team	Apps	(Gls)
2011–2024	PDRM	14	(0)
2026–	CCCP-KDN	0	(0)
- * Club domestic league appearances and goals as of 8 August 2021

Willfred Anak Jabun (born 12 April 1989) is a Malaysian professional footballer who plays as a goalkeeper.
