= Asri Muhamad =

Malaysian footballer

Personal information
- Full name: Muhd Asri bin Muhamad
- Date of birth: 2 October 1998 (age 28)
- Place of birth: Kedah, Malaysia
- Height: 1.73 m (5 ft 8 in)
- Position: Goalkeeper

Team information
- Current team: CCCP-KDN
- Number: 20

Youth career
- Kedah Darul Aman
- 2019: Cardiff City Academy

Senior career*
Years	Team	Apps	(Gls)
2017–2020	Kedah Darul Aman	3	(0)
2020	→ Langkawi City (loan)	0	(0)
2021–2022	PDRM	29	(0)
2024–2026	PDRM	0	(0)
2026–	CCCP-KDN	0	(0)

International career^{‡}
2013–2016	Malaysia U-17	0	(0)
- * Club domestic league appearances and goals as of 8 August 2021 ‡ National team caps and goals as of 8 August 2016

Muhd Asri bin Muhamad (born 2 October 1998) is a Malaysian professional footballer who plays as a goalkeeper for PDRM.
