= Yayasan Pahang Maintenance F.C. =

Malaysian football club

YPM
- Full name: Yayasan Pahang Maintenance Football Club
- Short name: YPM
- Founded: 2013; 13 years ago
- Ground: UIA Mini Stadium, Kuantan; Darul Makmur Stadium
- Capacity: 2,500; 40,000
- Owner: YP Maintenance Sdn. Bhd.
- Head coach: Syed Farul Hakim Syied Mahmud
- League: Malaysia A2 Amateur League
- Website: www.fc-ypm.com
Home colours	Away colours

Yayasan Pahang Maintenance Football Club, simply known as YPM, is a Malaysian football club based in Kuantan, Pahang. It currently plays in the third-tier Malaysia A2 Amateur League. The club's home ground is the 2,500 capacity UIA Mini Stadium, Kuantan.

== History ==
Founded in 2013, the club is actively participating in football competitions at the district and state levels. In 2019 YPM FC won the Liga Kuantan Divisyen 2. In 2022 it was crowned as champion of the Liga Indera and the Kuantan Amateur League. In 2023 YPM FC got promoted to the Al Ikhsan Cup as runners-up. YPM FC then got promoted to the second-tier Malaysia A1 Semi-Pro League for 2024–25 season.

In the 2024–25 Malaysia A1 Semi-Pro League season, YPM FC finished 10th out of 15 teams. They continue to focus on developing local talent and aim to improve its standing in the national football scene.

== Crest and colours ==
=== Crest ===
YPM FC only worn two crest since 2013.

2013 crest

2022 crest

=== Colours ===
YPM FC have worn blue with mixture of white for shirts as their home kit. While away colours are usually red with blue trim.

== Players ==
As of September 2025

Note: Flags indicate national team as defined under FIFA eligibility rules; some limited exceptions apply. Players may hold more than one non-FIFA nationality.

No.	Pos.	Nation	Player
1	GK	MAS	Yusuf Akma
4	DF	MAS	Adam Malique
5	DF	MAS	Raziq Zikry
6	DF	MAS	Ilham Yusof
7	MF	MAS	Syawal Norsam (captain)
8	MF	MAS	Badrul Amin Jesmi
9	FW	MAS	Amir Eimran Yusni
10	FW	MAS	Amierul Ismail
11	FW	MAS	Shahrul Aizad
12	FW	MAS	Azamuddin Akil
13	DF	MAS	Danish Azami
14	DF	MAS	Faisal Rosli

No.	Pos.	Nation	Player
15	FW	MAS	Hilmi Husaini
16	DF	MAS	Helmi Abdullah
17	DF	MAS	Arif Syazwan
18	DF	MAS	Irfan Mohd Ezral
20	DF	MAS	Nooradlan Mohd Ali
21	MF	MAS	Che Khairul Syafiq
22	DF	MAS	Fakhrul Haziq
23	FW	MAS	Nasyrullah Zaki
24	FW	MAS	Aliff Farhan Norasma
25	GK	MAS	Kamal Amirul Afiq
29	GK	MAS	Zul Ain Zamri
30	MF	MAS	Wan Muhammad Akmal

== Technical staff ==
As of September 2025

Position	Name
Team manager	(Malaysia) Ahmad Syukri Ibrahim
Assistant manager	(Malaysia) Jauhary Ramly
Head coach	(Malaysia) Syed Farul Hakim Syied Mahmud
Assistant coach	(Malaysia) Fauzi Roslan
Goalkeeper coach	(Malaysia) Mudzar Mohamad
Fitness coach	(Malaysia) Saiful Hadi Halidan
Team admin	(Malaysia) Syed Mohd Danieal Syied Mahmud
Kitman	(Malaysia) Aiman Syafiq Ahmad Aziddin (Malaysia) Ahmad Fahim Ahmad

== Season by season record ==
Champions	Runners-up	Third place	Promoted	Relegated

Season	Division	Position	Malaysia Cup	Malaysian FA Cup	Top scorer (all competitions)
2019	Liga Kuantan Divisyen 2	Champions	DNQ	DNQ	
2020–2021	Liga Kuantan	not held due to COVID-19 pandemic			
2022	Liga Indera	Champions	DNQ	DNQ	
2022	Kuantan Amateur League	Champions	DNQ	DNQ	
2023	Liga M4/Al-ikhsan Cup	Runner-up	DNQ	DNQ	(Malaysia) Fauzi Roslan (3) (Malaysia) Badrul Amin Jesmi (3)
2024–25	Liga A1 Semi-Pro	10th of 15	DNQ	DNQ	(Malaysia) Azamuddin Akil (10)
2025–26	Liga A2 Amateur	Quarter-finalist	DNQ	DNQ	(Malaysia) Muhamad Nasyrullah Mohd Zaki (4)

== Honours ==
=== Domestic competitions ===
==== League ====
- Liga Kuantan Division 2

(gold) Champions (1) : 2019

- Liga Indera

(gold) Champions (1): 2022

- Kuantan Amateur League

(gold) Champions (1) : 2022

- Division 4/A2 League

(silver) Runners-up (1): 2023

==== Cup ====
- Piala Menteri Besar

(gold) Winner (1) : 2023
