= 2024–25 Kuala Lumpur League =

The 2024–25 season is the 93rd season of the Kuala Lumpur League, which is a Malaysian football competition featuring semi-professional and amateur clubs from Kuala Lumpur. Tentera Darat are the defending champions.

== Teams ==
For 2024–25 season, there are 6 teams will compete in Super League while 17 teams in Premier League 1 and 19 in Premier League 2.

== Super League ==
Kuala Lumpur League Super League
- Season: 2024–25

Pos	Team	Pld	W	D	L	GF	GA	GD	Pts
1	Tentera Darat	10	9	1	0	21	3	+18	28
2	PULAPOL	10	5	4	1	17	13	+4	19
3	DRB-Hicom	10	4	1	5	13	14	−1	13
4	JLJD FC	9	2	1	6	13	12	+1	7
5	DBKL	9	1	4	4	7	10	−3	7
6	Setapak Jaya	8	0	3	5	5	24	−19	3

Updated to match(es) played on 17 April 2025. Source: Liga PBKL
Rules for classification: 1) Points; 2) Goal difference; 3) Number of goals scored.

== Premier League One ==
Kuala Lumpur League Premier League One
- Season: 2024–25

=== League table ===
==== Group A ====
Pos	Team	Pld	W	D	L	GF	GA	GD	Pts	Promotion, qualification or relegation
1	KL Youth	8	7	1	0	39	5	+34	22	Advance to knock-out stage
2	Kementah FC	8	6	2	0	26	6	+20	20	Advance to knock-out stage
3	Bukit Bandaraya	8	5	1	2	22	10	+12	16	Advance to knock-out stage
4	Sungai Merab F.C.	8	5	0	3	20	14	+6	15	Advance to knock-out stage
5	Starjets FC	8	3	1	4	16	14	+2	10	
6	Kosas FC	8	3	0	5	13	16	−3	9	
7	Bomba KL	8	2	1	5	17	14	+3	7	
8	Lembah Pantai	8	2	0	6	10	42	−32	6	
9	Setiawangsa Rangers F.C.	8	0	0	8	2	44	−42	0	

Updated to match(es) played on 4 March 2025. Source: Liga PBKL
Rules for classification: 1) Points; 2) Goal difference; 3) Number of goals scored.

==== Group B ====
Pos	Team	Pld	W	D	L	GF	GA	GD	Pts	Promotion, qualification or relegation
1	Estaletta FC	7	6	0	1	20	6	+14	18	Advance to knock-out stage
2	TRC-Putera Bandar	7	5	1	1	22	9	+13	16	Advance to knock-out stage
3	Cochrane Hunters	7	5	0	2	21	7	+14	15	Advance to knock-out stage
4	RAJD FC	7	5	0	2	19	5	+14	15	Advance to knock-out stage
5	Subang Nova	7	3	0	4	13	15	−2	9	
6	Pilihan Segambut	7	2	0	5	7	21	−14	6	
7	Kakep Mindef	7	0	2	5	9	23	−14	2	
8	KL City Enforcer	7	0	1	6	5	28	−23	1	

Updated to match(es) played on 4 March 2025. Source: Liga PBKL
Rules for classification: 1) Points; 2) Goal difference; 3) Number of goals scored.

==== Knock-out stage ====
Quarterfinals
KL Youth	4
RAJD FC	0
Estaletta FC	2 (2)
Sungai Merab FC	2 (4)
Kementah FC	1
Cochrane Hunters	2
TRC-Putera Bandar	2
Bukit Bandaraya FC	1

Semifinals
KL Youth	2 (6)
Sungai Merab FC	2 (5)
Cochrane Hunters	1
TRC-Putera Bandar	0

Final
KL Youth
Cochrane Hunters

== Premier League Two ==
Kuala Lumpur League Premier League Two
- Season: 2024–25

=== League table ===
==== Group A ====
Pos	Team	Pld	W	D	L	GF	GA	GD	Pts	Promotion, qualification or relegation
1	Red Beret FC	8	7	1	0	33	5	+28	22	Advance to knock-out stage
2	Akademi PDRM FC	8	6	1	1	21	5	+16	19	Advance to knock-out stage & Promote to Premier League One
3	Nuri FC	8	6	0	2	25	11	+14	18	Advance to knock-out stage
4	CCCP FC	8	5	0	3	26	21	+5	15	Advance to knock-out stage
5	Zuhas FC	8	4	1	3	17	14	+3	13	
6	Gerakan FT	8	3	0	5	15	20	−5	9	
7	Putera Bandar FC	8	2	1	5	16	18	−2	7	
8	Tasaja FC	8	1	0	7	5	25	−20	3	
9	Bintang Merah FC	8	0	0	8	5	44	−39	0	

Updated to match(es) played on 4 March 2025. Source: Liga PBKL
Rules for classification: 1) Points; 2) Goal difference; 3) Number of goals scored.

==== Group B ====
Pos	Team	Pld	W	D	L	GF	GA	GD	Pts	Promotion, qualification or relegation
1	Kg Ku II	9	7	1	1	29	5	+24	22	Advance to knock-out stage & Promote to Premier League One
2	Pride Dragon City	9	6	3	0	24	5	+19	21	Advance to knock-out stage
3	Bandar Tun Razak	9	6	0	3	22	12	+10	18	Advance to knock-out stage
4	Klan Kreatif FC	9	5	3	1	13	9	+4	18	Advance to knock-out stage
5	Royal Service Corps	9	5	2	2	31	5	+26	17	
6	Wangsa Maju City	9	4	0	5	16	12	+4	12	
7	KPJ United	9	1	3	5	11	20	−9	6	
8	HKL FC	9	2	0	7	9	18	−9	6	
9	KTM KL	9	1	3	5	12	26	−14	6	
10	Muhibbah United	9	0	1	8	3	58	−55	1	

Updated to match(es) played on 4 March 2025. Source: Liga PBKL
Rules for classification: 1) Points; 2) Goal difference; 3) Number of goals scored.

==== Knock-out stage ====
Quarterfinals
Akademi PDRM FC	1 (7)
Bandar Tun Razak FC	1 (6)
Pride Dragon City	0
Nuri FC	3
Red Beret FC	1 (4)
Klan Kreatif FC	1 (3)
Kg Ku II	3
CCCP FC	0

Semifinals
Akademi PDRM FC	2
Nuri FC	1
Red Beret FC	0
Kg Ku II	1

Final
Akademi PDRM FC	2 (6)
Kg Ku II	2 (7)

== KLFA FA Cup ==
Kuala Lumpur League KLFA FA Cup
- Season: 2024–25

=== Knock-out stage ===
Round16
Tentera Darat	4
Starjets	0
Setapak Jaya FC	1 (4)
BOMBA KL FC	1 (5)
Kampong Ku II	3
JLJ FC	0
RSC FC	4
Wangsa Maju City	1
Sungai Merab	2
RAJD FC	1
TRC-Putera Bandar	1
PULAPOL	3
Red Beret FC	3
Cochrane Hunters FC	0
DBKL
KPJ United

Quarterfinals
Tentera Darat	2
BOMBA KL FC	0
Kampong Ku II	1
RSC FC	0
Sungai Merab	1 (1)
PULAPOL	1 (4)
Red Beret FC	0
DBKL	2

Semifinal
Tentera Darat	2
Kampong Ku II	1
PULAPOL	2
DBKL	0

Final
Tentera Darat	0 (4)
PULAPOL	0 (2)
