= 2022 Kuala Lumpur League =

Malaysian football league season

The 2022 season was the 91st season of the KLFA League, which is a Malaysian football competition featuring semi-professional and amateur clubs from Kuala Lumpur. DRB-Hicom are the defending champions.

== Super League ==
KLFA League Super League
- Season: 2022
- Champions: PULAPOL

=== League table ===
Pos	Team	Pld	W	D	L	GF	GA	GD	Pts	Promotion, qualification or relegation
1	PULAPOL (C)	9	9	0	0	45	8	+37	27	Qualification to play-offs M5 League
2	Imigresen II	9	8	0	1	36	9	+27	24	
3	Kg. Ku Kampung Baru	9	4	3	2	23	21	+2	15	
4	DRB-Hicom	9	4	2	3	17	14	+3	14	
5	JLJ Diraja	9	3	4	2	15	13	+2	13	
6	Laksamana 30 FC	9	3	2	4	11	17	−6	11	
7	Chandik F.C.	9	2	2	5	15	23	−8	8	
8	Kilat KL	9	2	1	6	11	30	−19	7	
9	Emzee F.C. (R)	9	2	1	6	16	35	−19	7	Relegation to KL Premier League
10	Paya F.C. (R)	9	0	1	8	7	25	−18	1	Relegation to KL Premier League

Source: KLFA Super League
Rules for classification: 1) Points; 2) Goal difference; 3) Number of goals scored.
(C) Champions; (R) Relegated

== Division 1 ==
KLFA League Division 1
- Season: 2022

=== Group A ===
Pos	Team	Pld	W	D	L	GF	GA	GD	Pts	Promotion, qualification or relegation
1	BOMBA FC (C)	9	9	0	0	45	8	+37	27	Advance to Knockout stage
2	HKL FC	9	8	0	1	36	9	+27	24	
3	Kilan Kreatif FC	9	4	3	2	23	21	+2	15	
4	Titiwangsa United	0	0	0	0	0	0	0	0	
5	Gerakan KL	9	3	4	2	15	13	+2	13	
6	Putera Bandar FC	9	3	2	4	11	17	−6	11	
7	Universiti Malaya FC	9	2	2	5	15	23	−8	8	
8	PPUKM FC	9	2	1	6	11	30	−19	7	
9	KL City Boys FC (R)	9	2	1	6	16	35	−19	7	Relegation to KL Premier League
10	Estaletta FC (R)	9	0	1	8	7	25	−18	1	Relegation to KL Premier League

Source: KLFA Super League
Rules for classification: 1) Points; 2) Goal difference; 3) Number of goals scored.
(C) Champions; (R) Relegated

=== Group B ===
Pos	Team	Pld	W	D	L	GF	GA	GD	Pts	Promotion, qualification or relegation
1	Petaling Putra FC (C)	9	7	1	1	45	8	+37	22	Advance to Knockout stage
2	ANF FC	9	7	0	2	36	9	+27	21	
3	KSRF FELDA FC	9	6	2	1	15	13	+2	20	
4	Fathul Karib FC	9	6	2	1	23	21	+2	20	
5	Setiawangsa Rangers	9	5	0	4	17	14	+3	15	
6	Starjets FC	9	3	0	6	11	17	−6	9	
7	Cochcrane Hunters FC	9	2	2	5	11	30	−19	8	
8	Subang Nova FC	9	2	0	7	15	23	−8	6	
9	Zuhas FC (R)	9	2	0	7	16	35	−19	6	Relegation to KL Premier League
10	KL Enforces FC (R)	9	1	1	7	7	25	−18	4	Relegation to KL Premier League

Source: KLFA Super League
Rules for classification: 1) Points; 2) Goal difference; 3) Number of goals scored.
(C) Champions; (R) Relegated

== Division 2 ==
Kuala Lumpur League Division 2
- Season: 2022
- Champions: Setapak Jaya
- Promoted: Setapak Jaya; Raja Muda Rovers

=== League table ===
==== Group A ====
Pos	Team	Pld	W	D	L	GF	GA	GD	Pts	Promotion, qualification or relegation
1	Setapak Jaya (C, P)	9	9	0	0	36	7	+29	27	Promotion to Super League
2	Sungai Merab	9	7	1	1	27	11	+16	22	
3	Perumahan Kastam KL	9	7	0	2	28	10	+18	21	
4	Nuri	9	5	2	2	27	24	+3	17	
5	Simpang Tiga	9	4	2	3	15	8	+7	14	
6	Muhibbah United	9	2	3	4	42	14	+28	9	
7	Tasaja	9	3	0	6	9	28	−19	9	
8	Kilat Metro	9	2	1	6	16	27	−11	7	
9	Gold Hill	9	1	0	8	26	22	+4	3	
10	Frenz United	9	0	1	8	12	31	−19	1	

Updated to match(es) played on 27 December 2022. Source: KLFA
Rules for classification: 1) Points; 2) Goal difference; 3) Number of goals scored.
(C) Champions; (P) Promoted

==== Group B ====
Pos	Team	Pld	W	D	L	GF	GA	GD	Pts	Promotion, qualification or relegation
1	Raja Muda Rovers (P)	11	10	1	0	43	8	+35	31	Promotion to Super League
2	Lembah Pantai	10	9	1	0	36	13	+23	28	
3	KSRS Utara	11	9	0	2	33	16	+17	27	
4	BANK	10	7	0	3	23	13	+10	21	
5	Astaria FC	10	5	1	4	30	23	+7	16	
6	Football Talent Asia	10	4	2	4	21	18	+3	14	
7	German Malaysia Institute	11	4	1	6	23	29	−6	13	
8	CCCP FC	11	4	1	6	21	26	−5	13	
9	Preffer FC	9	2	1	6	8	22	−14	7	
10	JSPT	10	2	0	8	24	28	−4	6	
11	FAT	11	1	0	10	7	29	−22	3	
12	Bintang Merah FC (R)	11	0	2	9	7	29	−22	2	Relegation to Division 2

Updated to match(es) played on 22 July 2018. Source: KLFA
Rules for classification: 1) Points; 2) Goal difference; 3) Number of goals scored.
(P) Promoted; (R) Relegated

=== Bracket ===
Quarter-finals
PULAPOL	3
Felcra HQ	1
Kosas Chendana	0
TUDM Hornet	2
Petaling Putra	2
KOR RRD	0
DRB Hicom	2
Bank Rakyat	2

Semi -finals
PULAPOL	2
TUDM Hornet	2
Petaling Putra	1
DRB Hicom	2

Final
PULAPOL	1
DRB Hicom	2

=== Quarter-finals ===
October 2018
16:00 UTC+8

PULAPOL	3–1	Felcra HQ

October 2018
16:00 UTC+8

Kosas Chendana	0–2	TUDM Hornet

October 2018
16:00 UTC+8

Petaling Putra	2–0	KOR RRD

October 2018
16:00 UTC+8

DRB-Hicom	2–2	Bank Rakyat

=== Semi-finals ===
20 October 2018
16:15 UTC+8

PULAPOL	2–2	TUDM Hornet

Padang Pudu Ulu

21 October 2018
16:15 UTC+8

Petaling Putra	1–2	DRB-Hicom

Padang Pudu Ulu

=== Final ===
3 November 2018
20:30 UTC+8

PULAPOL	1−2	DRB-Hicom

KLFA Stadium
