= 2023 Kuala Lumpur League =

The 2023 season was the 92nd season of the Kuala Lumpur League, which is a Malaysian football competition featuring semi-professional and amateur clubs from Kuala Lumpur. DRB-Hicom are the defending champions.

== Teams ==
For 2023 season, there are 14 teams will compete in Super League and 21 teams in Premier League. Top two team from the Super League will promoted to Malaysia M5 League for 2024–25 season.

== KLFA M5 League ==
Kuala Lumpur M5 League
- Season: 2023
- Champions: Kg. Ku Kampung Baru FC
- Promoted: Kg. Ku Kampung Baru FC

=== League table ===
Pos	Team	Pld	W	D	L	GF	GA	GD	Pts	Qualification or relegation
1	Kampong Ku Kg. Baru (C)	9	8	0	1	27	8	+19	24	Promotion to 2024–25 Al-Ikhsan Cup
2	Tentera Darat	9	7	1	1	30	9	+21	22	
3	PLUS	9	7	0	2	32	8	+24	21	
4	JLJD	9	5	1	3	15	7	+8	16	
5	Sungai Merab	9	4	2	3	18	13	+5	14	
6	PULAPOL II	9	3	3	3	12	14	−2	12	
7	Smart Focus	9	2	2	5	13	24	−11	8	
8	Penjara Kajang	9	1	4	4	14	22	−8	7	
9	HKL Fighter	9	0	2	7	4	22	−18	2	
10	UPM-Chandik	9	0	1	8	4	42	−38	1	

Updated to match(es) played on 7 October 2023. Source: FM Malaysia
Rules for classification: 1) Points; 2) Goal difference; 3) Number of goals scored.
(C) Champions

=== Fixtures and results ===
Match

==== Matchweek 1 ====
21 July 2023	JLJD FC	0−2	PLUS	Sungai Besi
17:00 UTC+8				Stadium: Sg. Besi Camp Football Field

22 July 2023	HKL Fighter	0−3	Smart Focus	Kuala Lumpur
17:00 UTC+8				Stadium: HKL Football Field

22 July 2023	UPM-Chandik FC	1−5	Kampong Ku Kg. Baru	Seri Kembangan
17:00 UTC+8				Stadium: UPM College Football Field 10

22 July 2023	Sungai Merab FC	3−0	PULAPOL FC II	Bangi, Selangor
17:00 UTC+8				Stadium: Agro Bank Training Institute Field

==== Matchweek 2 ====
28 July 2023	HKL Fighter	0−4	Kampong Ku Kg. Baru	Kuala Lumpur
17:00 UTC+8				Stadium: HKL Football Field

29 July 2023	JLJD FC	2−0	UPM-Chandik FC	Sungai Besi
17:00 UTC+8				Stadium: Sg. Besi Camp Football Field

29 July 2023	Tentera Darat	10−0	Smart Focus	Kuala Lumpur
17:00 UTC+8				Stadium: Batu Kentomen Camp Football Field

29 July 2023	Sungai Merab FC	1−1	Penjara Kajang	Bangi, Selangor
17:00 UTC+8				Stadium: Agro Bank Training Institute Field

==== Matchweek 3 ====
4 August 2023	PULAPOL FC II	0−4	PLUS	Kuala Lumpur
17:00 UTC+8				Stadium: PULAPOL KL Football Field

5 August 2023	Tentera Darat FA	5−2	Penjara Kajang FC	Kuala Lumpur
17:00 UTC+8				Stadium: Batu Kentomen Camp Football Field

5 August 2023	Kampong Ku Kg. Baru	2−0	Smart Focus	Kg. Baru, KL
17:00 UTC+8				Stadium: Jeonsa Mini Stadium

5 August 2023	UPM-Chandik	1−1	HKL Fighter	Seri Kembangan
17:00 UTC+8				Stadium: UPM College Football Field 14

5 August 2023	Sungai Merab FC	1−1	JLJD FC	Bangi, Selangor
17:00 UTC+8				Stadium: Agro Bank Training Institute Field

==== Matchweek 4 ====
17 August 2023	PLUS F.C.	10−0	UPM-Chandik	Serdang
17:00 UTC+8				Stadium: UPM Stadium

19 August 2023	JLJD FC	1−2	Tentera Darat FA	Sungai Besi
17:00 UTC+8				Stadium: Sg. Besi Camp Football Field

19 August 2023	PULAPOL FC II	1−1	Smart Focus FC	Kuala Lumpur
17:00 UTC+8				Stadium: PULAPOL KL Football Field

19 August 2023	Kampong Ku Kg. Baru	5−1	Sungai Merab FC	Kg. Baru, KL
17:00 UTC+8				Stadium: Jeonsa Mini Stadium

==== Matchweek 5 ====
26 August 2023	Tentera Darat FA	3−5	Kampong Ku Kg. Baru	Kuala Lumpur
17:00 UTC+8				Stadium: Batu Kentomen Camp Football Field

26 August 2023	PLUS F.C.	5−1	Smart Focus FC	Petaling Jaya
17:00 UTC+8				Stadium: Persada PLUS Mini Stadium

26 August 2023	Sungai Merab FC	6−0	UPM-Chandik FC	Bangi, Selangor
17:00 UTC+8				Stadium: Agro Bank Training Institute Field

30 August 2023	Penjara Kajang FC	0−3	JLJD FC	Kajang
17:00 UTC+8				Stadium: Penjara Mini Stadium

==== Matchweek 6 ====
2 September 2023	Sungai Merab FC	0−2	Tentera Darat FA	Bangi, Selangor
17:00 UTC+8				Stadium: Agro Bank Training Institute Field

2 September 2023	Kampong Ku Kg. Baru	3−1	PLUS F.C.	Kg. Baru, KL
17:00 UTC+8				Stadium: Jeonsa Mini Stadium

2 September 2023	JLJD FC	2−0	Smart Focus FC	Sungai Besi
17:00 UTC+8				Stadium: Sg. Besi Camp Football Field

2 September 2023	Penjara Kajang FC	2−2	HKL Fighter	Kajang
17:00 UTC+8				Stadium: Penjara Mini Stadium

13 September 2023	UPM-Chandik FC	0−5	PULAPOL FC II	Seri Kembangan
17:00 UTC+8				Stadium: UPM College 'A' Football Field

==== Matchweek 7 ====
8 September 2023	HKL Fighter	0−1	PULAPOL FC II	Kuala Lumpur
17:00 UTC+8				Stadium: HKL Football Field

9 September 2023	Penjara Kajang FC	1−2	Kampong Ku Kg. Baru	Kajang
17:00 UTC+8				Stadium: Penjara Mini Stadium

9 September 2023	PLUS F.C.	0−3	Tentera Darat FA	Petaling Jaya
17:00 UTC+8				Stadium: Persada PLUS Mini Stadium

9 September 2023	Sungai Merab FC	3−2	Smart Focus FC	Bangi, Selangor
17:00 UTC+8				Stadium: Agro Bank Training Institute Field

==== Matchweek 8 ====
15 September 2023	HKL Fighter	0−3	JLJD FC	Kuala Lumpur
16:45 UTC+8				Stadium: HKL Football Field

16 September 2023	PULAPOL FC II	0−0	Tentera Darat	Kuala Lumpur
16:45 UTC+8				Stadium: PULAPOL KL Football Field

16 September 2023	PLUS F.C.	2−0	Sungai Merab FC	Petaling Jaya
16:45 UTC+8				Stadium: Persada PLUS Mini Stadium

16 September 2023	UPM-Chandik FC	1−6	Smart Focus FC	Seri Kembangan
16:45 UTC+8				Stadium: UPM College Football Field 10

==== Matchweek 9 ====
19 September 2023	HKL Fighter	1−2	Tentera Darat	Kuala Lumpur
16:45 UTC+8				Stadium: HKL Football Field

20 September 2023	PULAPOL II	1−0	kampongku Kg. Baru FC	Kuala Lumpur
16:45 UTC+8				Stadium: HKL Football Field

September 2023	Penjara Kajang	0−0	Smart Focus FC
16:45 UTC+8

September 2023	Penjara Kajang	4−1	UPM-Chandik FC
16:45 UTC+8

==== Matchweek 10 ====
22 September 2023	HKL Fighter	0−3	PLUS F.C.	Kuala Lumpur
16:45 UTC+8				Stadium: HKL Football Field

23 September 2023	Penjara Kajang FC	3−3	PULAPOL FC II	Kajang
16:45 UTC+8				Stadium: Penjara Mini Stadium

23 September 2023	Kampong Ku Kg. Baru	1−0	JLJD FC	Kg. Baru, KL
16:45 UTC+8				Stadium: Jeonsa Mini Stadium

23 September 2023	Tentera Darat	3−0	UPM-Chandik FC	Kuala Lumpur
16:45 UTC+8				Stadium: Batu Kentomen Camp Football Field

==== Matchweek 11 ====
29 September 2023	Sungai Merab FC	3−0	HKL Fighter	Bangi, Selangor
16:45 UTC+8				Stadium: Agro Bank Training Institute Field

30 September 2023	PLUS F.C.	5−1	Penjara Kajang FC	Petaling Jaya
16:45 UTC+8				Stadium: Persada PLUS Mini Stadium

7 October 2023	JLJD FC	3−1	PULAPOL FC II	Sungai Besi
16:45 UTC+8				Stadium: Sg. Besi Camp Football Field

== Super League ==
Kuala Lumpur League Super League
- Season: 2023
- Champions: Tentera Darat

=== League table ===
==== Group A ====
Pos	Team	Pld	W	D	L	GF	GA	GD	Pts	Promotion, qualification or relegation
1	Tentera Darat	6	6	0	0	21	8	+13	18	Advance to knock-out stage
2	Petaling Putra FC	5	3	1	1	10	5	+5	10	Advance to knock-out stage
3	JLJD FC	5	3	0	2	13	8	+5	9	Advance to knock-out stage
4	PULAPOL	4	2	1	1	10	3	+7	7	Advance to knock-out stage
5	CCCP FC	4	1	0	3	6	10	−4	3	
6	Fathul Karib FC	5	1	0	4	3	13	−10	3	Relegation to KL Premier League
7	Dang Wangi FC	5	0	0	5	2	17	−15	0	Relegation to KL Premier League

Updated to match(es) played on October 2023. Source:
Rules for classification: 1) Points; 2) Goal difference; 3) Number of goals scored.

==== Group B ====
Pos	Team	Pld	W	D	L	GF	GA	GD	Pts	Promotion, qualification or relegation
1	DRB-Hicom	5	4	1	0	14	3	+11	13	Advance to knock-out stage
2	Smart Focus MPNA FC	5	2	2	1	9	4	+5	8	Advance to knock-out stage
3	Setapak Jaya FC	5	0	5	0	7	7	0	5	Advance to knock-out stage
4	TRC Putera Bandar FC	5	1	2	2	6	12	−6	5	Advance to knock-out stage
5	HKL FC	5	1	1	3	3	6	−3	4	
6	Creative Plan FC	5	0	3	2	6	10	−4	3	Relegation to KL Premier League

Updated to match(es) played on October 2023. Source: Liga KL
Rules for classification: 1) Points; 2) Goal difference; 3) Number of goals scored.

==== Super League Knock-out stage ====
Quarterfinals
DRB-Hicom	1
PULAPOL	0
Tentera Darat	1
TRC-Putra Bandar	0
Petaling Putra	1
Setapak Jaya	2
Smart Focus	0 (5)
JLJD	0 (3)

Semifinals
DRB-Hicom
Tentera Darat
Setapak Jaya
Smart Focus

Final
Tentera Darat	3
Smart Focus	1

== Premier League ==
Kuala Lumpur League Premier League
- Season: 2023
- Champions: RAJD FC

=== League table ===
==== Group A ====
Pos	Team	Pld	W	D	L	GF	GA	GD	Pts	Promotion, qualification or relegation
1	Starjets FC	6	5	1	0	14	1	+13	16	advanced to knockout stage
2	Kosas FT	5	4	1	0	14	3	+11	13	advanced to knockout stage
3	Pilihan Segambut FC	4	3	0	1	10	4	+6	9	advanced to knockout stage
4	Muhibbah United	5	2	0	3	10	16	−6	6	
5	Gerakan KL FC	6	1	1	4	6	11	−5	4	
6	Subang Nova FC	5	1	0	4	3	15	−12	3	
7	Estaletta Cheras City	5	0	1	4	5	11	−6	1	

Updated to match(es) played on October 2023. Source:
Rules for classification: 1) Points; 2) Goal difference; 3) Number of goals scored.

==== Group B ====
Pos	Team	Pld	W	D	L	GF	GA	GD	Pts	Promotion, qualification or relegation
1	RAJD FC	5	5	0	0	30	4	+26	15	advanced to knockout stage
2	Cochrane Hunters FC	5	4	0	1	13	8	+5	12	advanced to knockout stage
3	Hypernova FC	5	3	1	1	16	6	+10	10	advanced to knockout stage
4	Paya Resources FC	5	2	1	2	10	7	+3	7	
5	Simpang Tiga FC	5	1	0	4	8	16	−8	3	
6	Tasaja FC	5	1	0	4	4	20	−16	3	
7	Bintang Merah FC	6	1	0	5	4	23	−19	3	

Updated to match(es) played on October 2023. Source:
Rules for classification: 1) Points; 2) Goal difference; 3) Number of goals scored.

==== Group C ====
Pos	Team	Pld	W	D	L	GF	GA	GD	Pts	Promotion, qualification or relegation
1	KL Rovers II	6	5	1	0	25	5	+20	16	advanced to knockout stage
2	Kilat KL FC	6	3	2	1	11	6	+5	11	advanced to knockout stage
3	Kampong Ku Kg. Baru	6	3	2	1	8	5	+3	11	
4	BOMBA FC	6	1	3	2	9	7	+2	6	
5	Akademi PDRM	6	1	2	3	7	9	−2	5	
6	Titiwangsa United	6	1	2	3	10	14	−4	5	
7	KTM FC	6	0	3	3	3	13	−10	3	

Updated to match(es) played on October 2023. Source:
Rules for classification: 1) Points; 2) Goal difference; 3) Number of goals scored.

==== Knock-out stage ====
Quarterfinals
Kosas	3
Hypernova	0
RAJD	1
Kilat KL	0
KL Rovers II	6
Starjets	1
Pilihan Segambut	1
Cochrane Hunters	2

Semifinals
Kosas	2
RAJD	5
KL Rovers II	4
Cochrane Hunters	1

Final
RAJD	2
KL Rovers II	1

== KLFA FA Cup ==
Kuala Lumpur League KLFA FA Cup
- Season: 2023
- Champions: JLJD FC

=== Knock-out stage ===
Quarterfinals
RAJD FC	1 (5)
PULAPOL FC	1 (6)
JLJD FC	2
Tentera Darat FA	1
DRB-Hicom FC	3
KL Rovers II	1
Starjets FC	1
Kampong Ku FC	2

Semifinals
PULAPOL FC	0
JLJD FC	1
DRB-Hicom FC	4
Kampong Ku FC	1

Final
JLJD FC	1 (4)
DRB-Hicom FC	1 (2)
