= 2023 Malaysia M5 League =

Malaysia M5 League
- Season: 2023

The 2023 Malaysia M5 League (Malay: Liga M5 Malaysia) was the second season of the Malaysia M5 League, the fourth tier football league in the Malaysian football league system.

== Teams changes ==
▲ Promoted to 2023 Liga M4	▼ Relegated from 2019 Liga M4
(Negeri Sembilan) Bunga Raya; (Pahang) Cendawan; (Negeri Sembilan) Cyberfox; (Putrajaya) JAKIM; (Selangor) MAHSA City; (Negeri Sembilan) MP Port Dickson; (Sarawak) Mukah Youth Team; (Selangor) Republic of Borneo; (Pahang) YP Maintenance	None

Notes

1. Cendawan FC (CEN): changed name to CF Kuantan City.

== Teams ==
The table below shows the number of teams participating in the 4 zonal leagues and the number of slots allocated to each league for the Malaysia A2 Amateur League.

South Zone
State/Community leagues	PT	PS	Winner	Promoted
(Negeri Sembilan) A-Ligue Nismilan	15	1	Ayrish F.C.	Real Mambau F.C.
(Malacca) Liga Melaka	Not held			
FA Johor	Not held			

East Coast Zone
State/Community leagues	PT	PS	Winner	Promoted
(Pahang) Liga Mahkota Pekan M5	16	1	FC Belacan U23	None
Pahang Amateur League	20	1	Parot F.C.	Semantan Troopers F.C.
Kelantan Football League	12	1	None	None
FA Terengganu	Not held			

North Zone
State/Community leagues	PT	PS	Winner	Promoted
(Perak) PBDLMS M5 League	10	1	MP Manjung F.C.	Pencinta Setia F.C.
(Perak) Manjung Football League M5	10	1	TNB Janamanjung Kilat F.C.	None
Perlis Super League	14	1	Guar Syed Alwi F.C.	Guar Syed Alwi F.C.
FA Penang	Not held			
FA Kedah	Not held			

Central Zone
State/Community leagues	PT	PS	Winner	Promoted
(Selangor) A-Ligue Champions League M5	33	1	Northern Merbau F.C.	NBK Empire F.C.
RAFA Southern Selangor League	10	1	RAS FC	Bunga Raya FC II
(Selangor) Citi League	10	1	Sky United F.C.	None
(Selangor) Footy Premier League M5	10	1	UiTM NS F.C.	None
(Selangor) MAHSA-KRONOS M5 League	9	1	Gombak City FC	Gombak City FC
(Kuala Lumpur) KLFA M5 League	10	1	Kampong Ku F.C.	Kampong Ku F.C.
Putrajaya League M5	10	1	SJ Virtuosos F.C.	SJ Virtuosos F.C.

Borneo Zone
State/Community leagues	PT	PS	Winner	Promoted
S Ligue M5 Sarawak	11	1	Maqarize II	None
(Sabah) V Ligue Kota Kinabalu	11	1	Tenang F.C.	None

Notes:

- PT (participating teams): Total number of teams participating in each league
- PS (promotion slots): Number of slots allocated to each league for the A2 Amateur League

== Borneo Zone ==
=== S Ligue M5 Sarawak ===
==== Group Stage ====
===== Group A =====
Pos	Team	Pld	W	D	L	GF	GA	GD	Pts	Promotion, qualification or relegation
1	Mix Hajiba	10	10	0	0	31	5	+26	30	Advance to knock-out stage
2	TP United	10	6	1	3	25	10	+15	19	Advance to knock-out stage
3	Pasir Pandak	10	4	1	5	15	18	−3	13	Advance to knock-out stage
4	FSR	10	4	1	5	13	18	−5	13	Advance to knock-out stage
5	SHOAW Oldboys	10	3	2	5	13	26	−13	11	
6	Lotri17 FB	10	0	1	9	7	27	−20	1	

Updated to match(es) played on 14 August 2023. Source: SLigue M5 Sarawak
Rules for classification: 1) Points; 2) Goal difference; 3) Number of goals scored.

===== Group B =====
Pos	Team	Pld	W	D	L	GF	GA	GD	Pts	Promotion, qualification or relegation
1	Maqarize II (C)	8	7	0	1	21	4	+17	21	Advance to knock-out stage
2	Rimong Crocs United	8	4	2	2	12	10	+2	14	Advance to knock-out stage
3	Pusak SC	8	3	2	3	12	15	−3	11	Advance to knock-out stage
4	Admania	8	1	3	4	12	16	−4	6	Advance to knock-out stage
5	Sempurna Jaya	8	1	1	6	11	23	−12	4	

Updated to match(es) played on 14 August 2023. Source: SLigue M5 Sarawak
Rules for classification: 1) Points; 2) Goal difference; 3) Number of goals scored.
(C) Champions

==== Knock-out stage ====
Quarterfinals
1A	Mix Hajiba	5	5	10
4B	Admania	2	2	4
2B	Rimong Crocs United	5	0	5
3A	Pasir Pandak	3	0	3
1B	Maqarize II	2	3	5
4A	FSR	1	0	1
2A	TP United	4	1	5
3B	Pusak SC	3	1	4

Semifinals
Mix Hajiba	1	2	3
Rimong Crocs United	1	1	2
Maqarize II	3	3	6
TP United	1	0	1

Finals
Mix Hajiba	2
Maqarize II	5

==== Quarter-finals ====
===== First leg =====
19 August 2023	Mix Hajiba FT	5−2	Admania FC	Lundu, Sarawak
14:00 UTC+8				Stadium: Lundu Stadium

19 August 2023	Rimong Crocs United	5−3	Pasir Pandak FC	Lundu, Sarawak
16:15 UTC+8				Stadium: Lundu Stadium

20 August 2023	Maqarize FC II	2−1	FSR FC	Lundu, Sarawak
14:00 UTC+8				Stadium: Lundu Stadium

20 August 2023	TP United	4−3	Pusak SC	Lundu, Sarawak
16:15 UTC+8				Stadium: Lundu Stadium

===== Second leg =====
26 August 2023	Admania FC	2−5	Mix Hajiba FT	Lundu, Sarawak
14:00 UTC+8				Stadium: Lundu Stadium

26 August 2023	Pasir Pandak FC	0−0	Rimong Crocs United	Lundu, Sarawak
16:15 UTC+8				Stadium: Lundu Stadium

26 August 2023	FSR FC	0−3	Maqarize FC II	Lundu, Sarawak
14:00 UTC+8				Stadium: Lundu Stadium

26 August 2023	Pusak SC	1−1	TP United	Lundu, Sarawak
16:15 UTC+8				Stadium: Lundu Stadium

===== Semi-finals =====
====== First leg ======
9 September 2023	Mix Hajiba FT	1−1	Rimong Crocs United	Lundu, Sarawak
: UTC+8				Stadium: Lundu Stadium

9 September 2023	Maqarize FC II	3−1	TP United	Lundu, Sarawak
: UTC+8				Stadium: Lundu Stadium

====== Second leg ======
17 September 2023	Rimong Crocs United	1−2	Mix Hajiba FT	Lundu, Sarawak
14:00 UTC+8		Report		Stadium: Lundu Stadium

24 September 2023	TP United	0−3	Maqarize FC II	Lundu, Sarawak
: UTC+8				Stadium: Lundu Stadium

===== Final =====
11 November 2023	Mix Hajiba FT	2−5	Maqarize FC II	Lundu, Sarawak
15:30 UTC+8				Stadium: Lundu Stadium

=== V Ligue Kota Kinabalu 2023-24 ===
Pos	Team	Pld	W	D	L	GF	GA	GD	Pts
1	Tenang (C)	9	9	0	0	66	2	+64	27
2	Putra United	9	9	0	0	54	9	+45	27
3	Inter United	8	6	0	2	37	14	+23	18
4	UAJ X Patio	9	5	0	4	34	15	+19	15
5	KK Vibes	8	4	0	4	13	20	−7	12
6	Aropabuai FT	9	2	2	5	15	32	−17	8
7	SS Family Team	4	2	0	2	6	12	−6	6
8	Borneo United	10	1	3	6	10	41	−31	6
9	Magni FT	7	1	2	4	10	38	−28	5
10	Gading Timur	7	1	0	6	11	33	−22	3
11	MFC	9	0	1	8	6	57	−51	1

Updated to match(es) played on 5 January 2024. Source: Vligue M5 Sabah
Rules for classification: 1) Points; 2) Goal difference; 3) Number of goals scored.
(C) Champions

== Central Zone ==
=== A-Ligue Champions League M5 ===
A Ligue Champions League M5
- Season: 2023
- Champions: Northern Merbau
- Promoted: NBK Empire

==== Group Stage ====
===== Group A (Setiawangsa) =====
Pos	Team	Pld	W	D	L	GF	GA	GD	Pts	Qualification or relegation
1	OSV UK	9	7	2	0	36	4	+32	23	Advance to knock-out stage
2	MPAJ	9	7	2	0	25	2	+23	23	Advance to knock-out stage
3	NBK Empire	9	6	1	2	31	9	+22	19	Advance to Knockout Stage & Promotion to al-ikhsan Cup
4	Darussaada	9	5	4	0	22	6	+16	19	Advance to knock-out stage
5	CIMB YFA	9	5	1	3	16	15	+1	16	
6	Dang Wangi	8	3	0	5	11	13	−2	9	
7	Young Falcons	8	2	1	5	9	21	−12	7	
8	Pantai Ria	9	2	1	6	8	40	−32	7	
9	PULAPOL	9	0	1	8	0	24	−24	1	
10	Lembah Pantai	9	0	1	8	0	24	−24	1	

Updated to match(es) played on 28 August 2023. Source: A-Ligue
Rules for classification: 1) Points; 2) Goal difference; 3) Number of goals scored.

===== Group B (Serdang) =====
Pos	Team	Pld	W	D	L	GF	GA	GD	Pts	Qualification or relegation
1	Northern Merbau (C)	10	7	2	1	45	11	+34	23	Advance to knock-out stage
2	Alha Alfa	10	7	2	1	28	7	+21	23	Advance to knock-out stage
3	Loyal Troopers	10	4	5	1	22	8	+14	17	Advance to knock-out stage
4	Salak Tinggi United	10	3	3	4	25	17	+8	12	Advance to knock-out stage
5	Citra	10	2	2	6	17	26	−9	8	
6	Bara	10	0	0	10	0	68	−68	0	

Updated to match(es) played on 3 September 2023. Source: A-Ligue
Rules for classification: 1) Points; 2) Goal difference; 3) Number of goals scored.
(C) Champions

===== Group C (Shah Alam) =====
Pos	Team	Pld	W	D	L	GF	GA	GD	Pts	Qualification or relegation
1	STW Jelai FC	12	11	0	1	55	5	+50	33	Advance to knock-out stage
2	AZ Empire	12	8	1	3	30	20	+10	25	Advance to knock-out stage
3	Sun Rider's	12	9	0	3	43	10	+33	27	Advance to knock-out stage
4	Visionary	12	5	1	6	18	18	0	16	Advance to knock-out stage
5	Shah Alam Rovers	12	4	1	7	14	33	−19	13	
6	Ballistar	12	2	1	9	9	33	−24	7	
7	Kickers	12	1	0	11	11	61	−50	3	

Updated to match(es) played on 3 September 2023. Source: A-Ligue
Rules for classification: 1) Points; 2) Goal difference; 3) Number of goals scored.

===== Group D (Bangi) =====
Pos	Team	Pld	W	D	L	GF	GA	GD	Pts	Qualification or relegation
1	Arslan	9	8	0	1	31	6	+25	24	Advance to knock-out stage
2	Puchong Utama	9	7	0	2	17	6	+11	21	Advance to knock-out stage
3	Nadi Sepang	9	6	1	2	16	8	+8	19	Advance to knock-out stage
4	Mix Gen Knight	9	5	1	3	21	13	+8	16	Advance to knock-out stage
5	The Gathers	9	4	3	2	14	14	0	15	
6	KVC	9	3	3	3	13	15	−2	12	
7	Gators	9	3	2	4	10	14	−4	11	
8	Neo X	9	1	3	5	9	15	−6	6	
9	Scammerz	9	1	1	7	9	27	−18	4	
10	BBB	9	0	0	9	1	24	−23	0	

Updated to match(es) played on 3 September 2023. Source: A-Ligue
Rules for classification: 1) Points; 2) Goal difference; 3) Number of goals scored.

===== Knock-out stage =====
Round16
MP Ampang Jaya	7	4	11
Mix Gen Knight	0	1	1
Alha Alfa	3	3	6
AZ Empire	2	1	3
NBK Empire	4	2	6
Puchong Utama	0	0	0
Salak Tinggi	1	0	1
STW Jelai	7	3	10
Northern Merbau	2	2	4
Visionary	1	1	2
OSV UK	1	3	4
NADI Sepang	1	1	2
Loyal Troopers	2	1	3
Sun Riders	3	3	6
Darrusada	2	0	2
Arslan	0	1	1

Quarterfinals
MP Ampang Jaya	0	0	0 (2)
Alha Alfa	0	0	0 (4)
NBK Empire	0	0	0 (5)
STW Jelai	0	0	0 (3)
Northern Merbau	3	0	3
OSV UK	1	1	2
Sun Rider's	0	1	1
Darussada	1	1	2

Semifinal
Alha Alfa	0	4	4
NBK Empire	5	1	6
Northern Merbau	1	1	2
Darussada	0	1	1

Final
NBK Empire	3 (3)
Northern Merbau	3 (4)
Third place play-off
Alha Alfa	2
Darussada	0

==== Fixtures and results ====
Match

===== Round of 16 =====
====== First leg ======
9 September 2023	OSV UK	1−1	Nadi Sepang	Kg. Baru, K.Lumpur
15:00 UTC+8				Stadium: Padang Raja Muda

9 September 2023	Darussada	2−0	Arslan	Taman Melati, K.Lumpur
15:30 UTC+8				Stadium: Padang KLFA

9 September 2023	NBK Empire	4−0	Puchong Utama	Taman Melati, K.Lumpur
17:00 UTC+8				Stadium: Padang KLFA

9 September 2023	MPAJ	7−0	Mix Gen Knight	Taman Melati, K.Lumpur
18:30 UTC+8				Stadium: Padang KLFA

11 September 2023	Salak Tinggi United	1−7	STW Jelai	Bandar Baru Bangi
20:00 UTC+8				Stadium: Arena Jubli Perak

11 September 2023	Northern Merbau	2−1	Visionary	Bandar Baru Bangi
21:25 UTC+8				Stadium: Arena Jubli Perak

11 September 2023	Alha Alfa	3−2	AZ Empire	Bandar Baru Bangi
22:50 UTC+8				Stadium: Arena Jubli Perak

12 September 2023	Loyal Troopers	2−3	Sun Rider's	Bandar Baru Bangi
22:00 UTC+8				Stadium: Arena Jubli Perak

====== Second leg ======
16 September 2023	Nadi Sepang	1−3	OSV UK	Bandar Baru Bangi
15:00 UTC+8				Stadium: Arena Jubli Perak

17 September 2023	Mix Gen Knight	1−4	MP Ampang Jaya	Bandar Baru Bangi
14:40 UTC+8				Stadium: Arena Jubli Perak

17 September 2023	Puchong Utama	0−2	NBK Empire	Bandar Baru Bangi
16:05 UTC+8				Stadium: Arena Jubli Perak

17 September 2023	Arslan	1−0	Darussada	Bandar Baru Bangi
17:30 UTC+8				Stadium: Arena Jubli Perak

17 September 2023	AZ Empire	1−3	Alha Alfa	Setia Alam
14:40 UTC+8				Stadium: Padang A, Eco Ardence

17 September 2023	Visionary	1−2	Northern Merbau	Setia Alam
14:40 UTC+8				Stadium: Padang B, Eco Ardence

17 September 2023	Sun Rider's	3−1	Loyal Trooper	Setia Alam
16:05 UTC+8				Stadium: Padang A, Eco Ardence

17 September 2023	STW Jelai	3−0	Salak Tinggi United	Setia Alam
16:05 UTC+8				Stadium: Padang B, Eco Ardence

===== Quarter-finals =====
====== First leg ======
24 September 2023	NBK Empire	0−0	STW Jelai	Taman Melawati, K.Lumpur
14:45 UTC+8				Stadium: Padang KLFA

24 September 2023	OSV UK	1−3	Northern Merbau	Taman Melawati, K.Lumpur
16:15 UTC+8				Stadium: Padang KLFA

24 September 2023	Darussada	1−0	Sun Rider's	Taman Melawati, K.Lumpur
17:45 UTC+8				Stadium: Padang KLFA

24 September 2023	MP Ampang Jaya	0−0	Alha Alfa	Ampang Jaya. Selangor
20:30 UTC+8				Stadium: MPAJ Stadium

====== Second leg ======
1 October 2023	STW Jelai	0−0 (a.e.t.) (3−5 p)	NBK Empire	Setia Alam
15:00 UTC+8				Stadium: Padang A, Eco Ardence

1 October 2023	Sun Rider's	1−1	Darussada	Setia Alam
15:00 UTC+8				Stadium: Padang B, Eco Ardence

1 October 2023	Alha Alfa	0−0 (a.e.t.) (4−2 p)	MP Ampang Jaya	Dengkil
18:30 UTC+8				Stadium: Padang Serenia City

1 October 2023	Northern Merbau	0−1	OSV UK	Dengkil
20:00 UTC+8				Stadium: Padang Serenia City

===== Semi-finals =====
====== First leg ======
8 October 2023	NBK Empire	5−0	Alha Alfa	Taman Melati, K.Lumpur
15:00 UTC+8				Stadium: Padang KLFA

8 October 2023	Darussada	0−1	Northern Merbau	Taman Melati, K.Lumpur
16:30 UTC+8				Stadium: Padang KLFA

====== Second leg ======
14 October 2023	Northern Merbau	1−1	Darussada	Bandar Baru Bangi
15:00 UTC+8				Stadium: Arena Jubli Perak

15 October 2023	Alha Alfa	4−1	NBK Empire	Bandar Baru Bangi
15:00 UTC+8				Stadium: Arena Jubli Perak

====== Third place play-off ======
22 October 2023	Alha Alfa	2−0	Darussada	Bangsar
14:40 UTC+8				Stadium: UM Arena

==== Final ====
22 October 2023
16:45 UTC+8

NBK Empire FC	3−3	Northern Merbau FC
Penalties
	3−4

UM Arena, Bangsar

=== KLFA M5 League ===
Pos	Team	Pld	W	D	L	GF	GA	GD	Pts	Qualification or relegation
1	Kampong Ku Kg. Baru (C)	9	8	0	1	27	8	+19	24	Promotion to al-ikhsan Cup
2	Tentera Darat	9	7	1	1	30	9	+21	22	
3	PLUS	9	7	0	2	32	8	+24	21	
4	JLJD	9	5	1	3	15	7	+8	16	
5	Sungai Merab	9	4	2	3	18	13	+5	14	
6	PULAPOL II	9	3	3	3	12	14	−2	12	
7	Smart Focus	9	2	2	5	13	24	−11	8	
8	Penjara Kajang	9	1	4	4	14	22	−8	7	
9	HKL Fighter	9	0	2	7	4	22	−18	2	
10	UPM-Chandik	9	0	1	8	4	42	−38	1	

Updated to match(es) played on 7 October 2023. Source: FM Malaysia
Rules for classification: 1) Points; 2) Goal difference; 3) Number of goals scored.
(C) Champions

=== RAFA Southern Selangor League ===
==== Group Stage ====
===== Group A =====
Pos	Team	Pld	W	D	L	GF	GA	GD	Pts	Qualification or relegation
1	R.A.S (C)	8	5	1	2	21	19	+2	16	Advance to Knockout Stage
2	Toge	8	5	0	3	17	11	+6	15	Advance to Knockout Stage
3	Red Four	7	3	0	4	14	14	0	9	Advance to Knockout Stage
4	Herby Crashers	7	2	1	4	12	18	−6	7	Advance to Knockout Stage
5	Progress	6	2	0	4	15	17	−2	6	

Updated to match(es) played on 10 September 2023. Source: TheLeague2023
Rules for classification: 1) Points; 2) Goal difference; 3) Number of goals scored.
(C) Champions

===== Group B =====
Pos	Team	Pld	W	D	L	GF	GA	GD	Pts	Qualification or relegation
1	Bunga Raya II	7	4	2	1	20	9	+11	14	Advance to Knockout Stage & Promotion to al-ikhsan Cup
2	PD United	7	4	1	2	21	10	+11	13	Advance to Knockout Stage
3	Cyberfox II	7	3	2	2	12	12	0	11	Advance to Knockout Stage
4	LBeeJ	7	1	3	3	12	14	−2	6	Advance to Knockout Stage
5	Asans	4	0	0	4	3	23	−20	0	

Updated to match(es) played on 10 September 2023. Source: TheLeague2023
Rules for classification: 1) Points; 2) Goal difference; 3) Number of goals scored.

===== Knock-out stage =====
Quarterfinals
1A	R.A.S	3	2	5
4B	LBeeJ	1	1	2
2B	PD United	1	3	4
3A	Red Four FC	2	0	2
1B	Bunga Raya II	3	3	6
4A	Herby Crashers	1	1	2
2A	Toge FC	3	4	7
3B	Cyberfox II	0	0	0

Semifinals
R.A.S	5	3	8
PD United	5	2	7
Bunga Raya II	2	2	4
Toge FC	0	1	1

Finals
R.A.S	4
Bunga Raya II	1

===== Quarter-finals =====
====== First leg ======
16 September 2023	R.A.S	3−1	LBeeJ	Dengkil
14:45 UTC+8	Ariff 30'; Hakimi 38'; Maro 80'			Stadium: RAFA Serenia City Football Turf

16 September 2023	PD United	1−2	Red Four FC	Dengkil
16:45 UTC+8				Stadium: RAFA Serenia City Football Turf

17 September 2023	Toge FC	3−0	Cyberfox II	Dengkil
14:45 UTC+8				Stadium: RAFA Serenia City Football Turf

17 September 2023	Bunga Raya II	3−1	Herby Crashers	Dengkil
16:45 UTC+8				Stadium: RAFA Serenia City Football Turf

====== Second leg ======
23 September 2023	Herby Crashers	1−3	Bunga Raya II	Dengkil
14:45 UTC+8				Stadium: RAFA Serenia City Football Turf

23 September 2023	Cyberfox II	0−4	Toge FC	Dengkil
16:45 UTC+8				Stadium: RAFA Serenia City Football Turf

24 September 2023	Red Four FC	0−3	PD United	Dengkil
14:45 UTC+8				Stadium: RAFA Serenia City Football Turf

24 September 2023	LBeeJ	1−2	R.A.S	Dengkil
16:45 UTC+8				Stadium: RAFA Serenia City Football Turf

===== Semi-finals =====
====== First leg ======
8 October 2023	R.A.S	5−5	PD United	Dengkil
16:45 UTC+8	Khairul Hadi; Khairul Izham; Ahmad Daniel; Ramadan,		Firdaus, Faiz; Izuddin; Shahrin	Stadium: RAFA Serenia City Football Turf

14 October 2023	Bunga Raya II	2−0	Toge FC	Dengkil
16:45 UTC+8				Stadium: RAFA Serenia City Football Turf

====== Second leg ======
21 October 2023	Toge FC	1−2	Bunga Raya II	Dengkil
17:00 UTC+8				Stadium: RAFA Serenia City Football Turf

29 October 2023	PD United	2−3	R.A.S	Dengkil
17:00 UTC+8				Stadium: RAFA Serenia City Football Turf

====== Final ======
17 December 2023	R.A.S	4−1	Bunga Raya II	Bangi, Selangor
20:00 UTC+8				Stadium: UKM Stadium

=== Citi League ===
==== Group Stage ====
===== Group A =====
Pos	Team	Pld	W	D	L	GF	GA	GD	Pts	Qualification or relegation
1	VIO7 FC	8	5	3	0	19	5	+14	18	Advance to Knockout Stage
2	Sunway University FC	8	4	4	0	19	6	+13	16	Advance to Knockout Stage
3	Sky United (C)	8	4	3	1	19	7	+12	15	Advance to Knockout Stage
4	Empire Beast FC	8	2	0	6	8	24	−16	6	Advance to Knockout Stage
5	Pantai City FC	8	0	0	8	7	32	−25	0	

Updated to match(es) played on 15 October 2023. Source: TheLeague2023
Rules for classification: 1) Points; 2) Goal difference; 3) Number of goals scored.
(C) Champions

===== Group B =====
Pos	Team	Pld	W	D	L	GF	GA	GD	Pts	Qualification or relegation
1	Hawk Harunian FC	8	5	2	1	26	5	+21	17	Advance to Knockout Stage
2	Republic of Borneo II	8	5	1	2	24	7	+17	16	Advance to Knockout Stage
3	Petaling FC	8	5	1	2	16	10	+6	16	Advance to Knockout Stage
4	Mixed FC	8	2	2	4	11	17	−6	8	Advance to Knockout Stage
5	Fadz FA	8	0	0	8	2	37	−35	0	

Updated to match(es) played on 15 October 2023. Source: TheLeague2023
Rules for classification: 1) Points; 2) Goal difference; 3) Number of goals scored.

===== Knock-out stage =====
Quarterfinals
A1	VIO7 FC	1	4	5
B4	Mixed FC	1	1	2
B2	Republic of Borneo II	1	1	2
A3	Sky United	2	2	4
B1	Hawk Harunian FC	7	4	11
A4	Empire Beast FC	1	0	1
A2	Sunway University FC	4	2	6
B3	Petaling FC	1	2	3

Semifinals
VIO7 FC	2	0	2
Sky United	1	4	5
Hawk Harunian FC	2	5	7
Sunway University FC	1	4	5

Final
Sky United	2
Hawk Harunian FC	1

=== Footy Premier League M5 ===
Pos	Team	Pld	W	D	L	GF	GA	GD	Pts	Qualification or relegation
1	FC Silencio Monarca	9	9	0	0	26	4	+22	27	Advance to Knockout Stage
2	Maghreb FC	9	8	0	1	24	6	+18	24	Advance to Knockout Stage
3	Esandreas FC	9	6	1	2	20	11	+9	19	Advance to Knockout Stage
4	UiTM NS FC (C)	9	6	0	3	22	5	+17	18	Advance to Knockout Stage
5	Kara United	9	5	0	4	19	10	+9	15	
6	Desa Setapak	9	3	1	5	24	23	+1	10	
7	FC Serayan	9	3	0	6	13	16	−3	9	
8	Soccer Cats FC	9	1	3	5	8	15	−7	6	
9	KL Tiger FC	9	1	1	7	4	37	−33	4	
10	United Tycoon	9	0	0	9	3	36	−33	0	

Updated to match(es) played on 22 October 2023. Source: Footy Premier League
Rules for classification: 1) Points; 2) Goal difference; 3) Number of goals scored.
(C) Champions

==== Knock-out stage ====
Semifinals
FC Silencio Monarca	6
Esandreas FC	1
Maghreb FC	2 (4)
UiTM NS FC	2 (5)

Final
FC Silencio Monarca	0
UiTM NS FC	1
Third place play-off
Esandreas FC	2
Maghreb FC	5

===== Semi-finals =====
25 October 2023	FC Silencio Monarca	6−1	Esandreas FC	Kg.Baru
21:30 UTC+8				Stadium: EV Arena KSS

25 October 2023	Maghreb FC	2−2 (4−5 p)	UiTM NS FC	Kg.Baru
23:00 UTC+8				Stadium: EV Arena KSS

===== Third place play-off =====
30 October 2023	Esandreas FC	2−5	Maghreb FC	Kg.Baru
20:00 UTC+8				Stadium: EV Arena KSS

===== Final =====
30 October 2023	FC Silencio Monarca	0−1	UiTM NS FC	Kg.Baru
21:30 UTC+8				Stadium: EV Arena KSS

=== MAHSA-KRONOS M5 League ===
MAHSA-KRONOS M5 League
- Season: 2023
- Champions: Gombak City
- Promoted: Gombak City

Pos	Team	Pld	W	D	L	GF	GA	GD	Pts	Qualification or relegation
1	Gombak City (C)	7	7	0	0	27	4	+23	21	Promotion to al-ikhsan Cup
2	Selangor Elite	8	6	0	2	26	13	+13	18	
3	Red Cardinal	8	5	0	3	22	12	+10	15	
4	Serdang	7	5	0	2	15	11	+4	15	
5	MAHSA United	7	3	0	4	12	10	+2	9	
6	Genpro	8	2	1	5	8	13	−5	7	
7	Hisamuddin	7	2	1	4	10	20	−10	7	
8	Sternen	7	1	1	5	10	21	−11	4	
9	Armada Belia Pandan	7	0	1	6	1	30	−29	1	

Updated to match(es) played on 15 October 2023. Source: MAHSA Recreation and Sports Centre
Rules for classification: 1) Points; 2) Goal difference; 3) Number of goals scored.
(C) Champions

=== Putrajaya League M5 ===
Putrajaya League M5
- Season: 2023
- Champions: SJ Virtuosos
- Promoted: SJ Virtuosos

Pos	Team	Pld	W	D	L	GF	GA	GD	Pts	Qualification or relegation
1	SJ Virtuosos (C)	9	7	1	1	39	12	+27	22	Promotion to al-ikhsan Cup
2	Sungai Merab	9	6	2	1	37	6	+31	20	
3	PPJ	9	6	2	1	26	10	+16	20	
4	Didad FC	9	5	1	3	20	11	+9	16	
5	Putrajaya FA U23	9	4	3	2	15	11	+4	15	
6	MAFC	9	4	1	4	20	12	+8	13	
7	Putrajaya United	9	3	2	4	13	16	−3	11	
8	TBA FC	9	2	1	6	9	35	−26	7	
9	TT United	9	1	1	7	6	38	−32	4	
10	IPD Putrajaya	9	0	0	9	14	48	−34	0	

Updated to match(es) played on 19 December 2023. Source: Putrajaya FA
Rules for classification: 1) Points; 2) Goal difference; 3) Number of goals scored.
(C) Champions

== East Coast Zone ==
=== Liga Mahkota Pekan M5 ===
==== Group Stage ====
===== Group A =====
Pos	Team	Pld	W	D	L	GF	GA	GD	Pts	Qualification
1	Dream Team	7	5	1	1	19	6	+13	16	Advance to Knockout Stage
2	The Beach Boy	7	4	2	1	18	9	+9	14	Advance to Knockout Stage
3	AP United	7	3	3	1	12	7	+5	12	Advance to Knockout Stage
4	FC Belacan U23 (C)	7	2	3	2	11	6	+5	9	Advance to Knockout Stage
5	SSO FT	7	2	2	3	9	18	−9	8	
6	Peroto FC	7	1	3	3	9	16	−7	6	
7	Kweker FC	7	1	3	3	9	17	−8	6	
8	Pekan City	7	1	1	5	12	20	−8	4	

Updated to match(es) played on 28 October 2023. Source: A-Ligue
Rules for classification: 1) Points; 2) Goal difference; 3) Number of goals scored.
(C) Champions

===== Group B =====
Pos	Team	Pld	W	D	L	GF	GA	GD	Pts	Qualification
1	Sri Pekan FC	7	5	1	1	26	9	+17	16	Advance to Knockout Stage
2	Masta MKSR	7	4	3	0	23	5	+18	15	Advance to Knockout Stage
3	FC Kabaso	7	4	0	3	11	9	+2	12	Advance to Knockout Stage
4	PYC All Star	7	3	2	2	20	11	+9	11	Advance to Knockout Stage
5	Young Skoll FC	7	3	2	2	14	7	+7	11	
6	Warisan Desa	7	2	1	4	9	10	−1	7	
7	Kelibat Fighter	7	1	1	5	10	19	−9	4	
8	Kompus FC	7	1	0	6	3	46	−43	3	

Updated to match(es) played on 28 October 2023. Source: A-Ligue
Rules for classification: 1) Points; 2) Goal difference; 3) Number of goals scored.

===== Knock-out stage =====
Quarterfinals
A1	Dream Team	3
B4	PYC All Star	1
B2	Masta MKSR	1(4)
A3	AP United	1(3)
A2	The Beach Boy	1
B3	FC Kabaso	3
B1	Sri Pekan FC	1(3)
A4	FC Belacan U23	1(5)

Semifinals
Dream Team
Masta MKSR
FC Kabaso	1
FC Belacan U23	2

Final
Dream Team	0(2)
FC Belacan U23	0(3)

=== Kelantan Football League (season abandonment) ===
==== Group Stage ====
===== Group A at the time of abandonment =====
Pos	Team	Pld	W	D	L	GF	GA	GD	Pts	Promotion or qualification
1	8BGD	4	3	1	0	8	2	+6	10	
2	Batu 30	3	2	1	0	7	2	+5	7	Qualified to join the PUC A3 Kelantan Champions League
3	Lubok Bongor	4	2	0	2	5	7	−2	6	
4	Bukit Jering	4	0	3	1	3	4	−1	3	
5	WTS II	2	0	1	1	1	4	−3	1	
6	Ketereh	3	0	0	3	2	7	−5	0	Qualified to join the PUC A3 Kelantan Champions League

Updated to match(es) played on 19 June 2023. Source: The League 2023
Rules for classification: 1) Points; 2) Goal difference; 3) Number of goals scored.

===== Group B at the time of abandonment =====
Pos	Team	Pld	W	D	L	GF	GA	GD	Pts	Promotion or qualification
1	Supersonic	4	2	2	0	12	4	+8	8	
2	KESEDAR	3	1	1	1	6	2	+4	4	
3	KADA	2	1	1	0	1	0	+1	4	
4	Jeli	1	1	0	0	1	0	+1	3	Qualified to join the PUC A3 Kelantan Champions League
5	Pasir Pekan	2	1	0	1	2	3	−1	3	
6	PABJ	4	0	0	4	2	15	−13	0	

Updated to match(es) played on 19 June 2023. Source: The League 2023
Rules for classification: 1) Points; 2) Goal difference; 3) Number of goals scored.

=== Pahang Amateur League ===
Pahang Amateur League
- Season: 2023
- Champions: Parot FC
- Promoted: Semantan Troopers

==== Group Stage ====
===== Zone Temerloh =====
Pos	Team	Pld	W	D	L	GF	GA	GD	Pts	Qualification or relegation
1	Semantan Troopers F.C.	7	4	2	1	16	6	+10	14	Advance to knock-out stage & Promotion to al-ikhsan Cup
2	Lipis Fighter	7	3	4	0	13	10	+3	13	Advance to the Knockout Stage
3	DACS Temerloh	7	4	0	3	8	8	0	12	Advance to the Knockout Stage
4	FC Jerantut	7	3	2	2	9	6	+3	11	
5	Vieura Wagga	7	3	1	3	8	7	+1	10	
6	FC Temerloh Jaya	7	3	0	4	9	10	−1	9	
7	Bandar 32 Bera	7	1	3	3	9	12	−3	6	
8	Abata	7	0	2	5	4	17	−13	2	

Updated to match(es) played on 30 July 2023. Source: Liga Amatur Pahang
Rules for classification: 1) Points; 2) Goal difference; 3) Number of goals scored.

===== Zone Jengka =====
Pos	Team	Pld	W	D	L	GF	GA	GD	Pts	Qualification or relegation
1	Parot (C)	6	6	0	0	27	1	+26	18	Advance to the Knockout Stage
2	Winstep	6	5	0	1	19	6	+13	15	Advance to the Knockout Stage
3	Eryna Tomyam	6	3	0	3	22	7	+15	9	Advance to the Knockout Stage
4	Jengka City	6	3	0	3	12	7	+5	9	
5	Jerantut AR	6	3	0	3	16	10	+6	9	
6	Sri Kenanga	6	1	0	5	4	45	−41	3	
7	Real Anak Bilis	6	0	0	6	5	29	−24	0	

Updated to match(es) played on 23 July 2023. Source: Liga Amatur Pahang
Rules for classification: 1) Points; 2) Goal difference; 3) Number of goals scored.
(C) Champions

===== Zone Kuantan =====
Pos	Team	Pld	W	D	L	GF	GA	GD	Pts	Qualification or relegation
1	MFT	8	5	2	1	21	7	+14	17	Advance to the Knockout Stage
2	FC Belacan	8	5	2	1	16	8	+8	17	Advance to the Knockout Stage
3	Squad Pancung Kuantan	8	4	1	3	23	21	+2	13	
4	Real Kuantan	8	2	2	4	12	20	−8	8	
5	GCMA	8	0	1	7	5	21	−16	1	

Updated to match(es) played on 5 August 2023. Source: Liga Amatur Pahang
Rules for classification: 1) Points; 2) Goal difference; 3) Number of goals scored.

===== Knock-out stage =====
Quarterfinals
FC Belacan	0 (4)
Lipis Fighter	0 (3)
Parot FC	2
DACS Temerloh FC	1
MFT	1
Jerantut ARFC	0
Semantan Troopers	4
Eryna Tomyam FC	0

Semifinals
FC Belacan	1 (3)
Parot FC	1 (5)
MFT	0
Semantan Troopers	2

Final
Parot FC	0 (5)
Semantan Troopers	0 (4)

====== Quarter-finals ======
19 August 2023	Belacan	0−0 (a.e.t.) (4–3 p)	Lipis Fighter	Jengka
15:00 UTC+8		Report		Stadium: Tun Abdul Razak Stadium

19 August 2023	Parot	2−1	DACS Temerloh	Jengka
17:15 UTC+8	Hairul Haikal 10'; Meor Ikmal 64'	Report	78' Farhan Mamat	Stadium: Tun Abdul Razak Stadium

19 August 2023	MFT	1−0	AR	Jengka
20:00 UTC+8	Zulhisyam Zulkifli 38'	Report		Stadium: Tun Abdul Razak Stadium

19 August 2023	Semantan Troopers	4−0	Eryna Tomyam	Jengka
22:15 UTC+8	Azimudin Ibrahim 2', 45+1'; Fadeli Idris 75'; Afif Adis 79'	Report		Stadium: Tun Abdul Razak Stadium

====== Semi-finals ======
27 August 2023	MFT	0−2	Semantan Troopers	Jengka
17:00 UTC+8		Report	Fadeli Idris 27'; Fariq Sahan 81'	Stadium: Tun Abdul Razak Stadium

27 August 2023	Belacan	1−1 (a.e.t.) (3–5 p)	Parot	Jengka
20:00 UTC+8	Amin Che Jusoh 7' (pen.)	Report	Azizul Naziruddin 24' (pen.)	Stadium: Tun Abdul Razak Stadium

====== Final ======
3 September 2023	Parot	0−0 (a.e.t.) (5–4 p)	Semantan Troopers	Jengka
20:45 UTC+8				Stadium: Tun Abdul Razak Stadium

== North Zone ==
=== PBDLMS M5 League 2023/24 ===
Pos	Team	Pld	W	D	L	GF	GA	GD	Pts	Qualification or relegation
1	MPM (C)	6	5	1	0	19	3	+16	16	
2	Harraz	6	4	1	1	19	10	+9	13	
3	Legasi Setiakawan	6	4	0	2	18	9	+9	12	
4	MPT	6	3	1	2	16	7	+9	10	
5	Royal Nine	6	2	1	3	8	12	−4	7	
6	MRM Perak	6	0	1	5	4	23	−19	1	
7	Pencinta Setia	6	0	1	5	5	25	−20	1	Promotion to al-ikhsan Cup
8	SUK	0	0	0	0	0	0	0	0	Withdrew
9	Redstar	0	0	0	0	0	0	0	0	Withdrew
10	NForce	0	0	0	0	0	0	0	0	Withdrew

Updated to match(es) played on 28 February 2024. Source: Pbdlms OBJ CUP
Rules for classification: 1) Points; 2) Goal difference; 3) Number of goals scored.
(C) Champions

=== Manjung Football League M5 ===
==== Group Stage ====
===== Group A =====
Pos	Team	Pld	W	D	L	GF	GA	GD	Pts	Qualification or relegation
1	Banjerona-Beruas	8	7	1	0	16	0	+16	22	Advance to Knockout Stage
2	Lumut Wanderers	8	4	3	1	11	4	+7	15	Advance to Knockout Stage
3	Smesma Soccer	8	3	1	4	14	14	0	10	Advance to Knockout Stage
4	Atletico Manjung	8	2	0	6	6	20	−14	6	Advance to Knockout Stage
5	UTP Spartan	8	1	1	6	5	14	−9	4	

Updated to match(es) played on 24 September 2023. Source: Manjung Football League
Rules for classification: 1) Points; 2) Goal difference; 3) Number of goals scored.

===== Group B =====
Pos	Team	Pld	W	D	L	GF	GA	GD	Pts	Qualification or relegation
1	TNB Janamanjung Kilat (C)	8	4	2	2	13	7	+6	14	Advance to Knockout Stage
2	Manjung	8	3	4	1	11	6	+5	13	Advance to Knockout Stage
3	All Mix	8	3	3	2	11	10	+1	12	Advance to Knockout Stage
4	Sitiawan City	8	3	1	4	9	17	−8	10	Advance to Knockout Stage
5	Black Mamba	8	2	0	6	8	12	−4	6	

Updated to match(es) played on 24 September 2023. Source: Manjung Football League
Rules for classification: 1) Points; 2) Goal difference; 3) Number of goals scored.
(C) Champions

===== Knock-out stage =====
Quarterfinals
1A	Banjerona-Beruas	0	1	1
4B	Sitiawan City	0	2	2
2B	Manjung	3	1	4
3A	Smesma Soccer	0	2	2
1B	Lumut Wanderers	1	0	1
4A	All Mix	3	2	5
2A	TNB Janamanjung Kilat	7	3	10
3B	Atletico Manjung	0	0	0

Semifinals
Sitiawan City	0	0	0
Manjung	2	1	3
All Mix	1	0	1
TNB Janamanjung Kilat	1	1	2

Finals
Manjung	0(6)
TNB Janamanjung Kilat	0(7)

===== Quarter-finals =====
====== First leg ======
7 October 2023	Banjerona-Beruas	0−0	Sitiawan City	Seri Manjung
15:00 UTC+8				Stadium: Padang SMK Seri Samudera

7 October 2023	Manjung	3−0	Smesma Soccer	Seri Manjung
17:15 UTC+8	Syamil 31'; Remiefarizf 34'; Haiman 56'			Stadium: Padang SMK Seri Samudera

8 October 2023	TNB Janamanjung Kilat	7−0	Atletico Manjung	Seri Manjung
17:15 UTC+8	Danial 3'; Syafiq 13'; Syarafi 28'; Amirul 48'; Khairunnas 54', 87'; Ahmad Nor 57'			Stadium: Padang SMK Seri Samudera

18 October 2023	All Mix	3−1	Lumut Wanderers	Seri Manjung
15:00 UTC+8	Danial Idzham 6'; Walconely Sipaul 45+4'; Hamzah Masah 80'		Afizudin Bakri 8'	Stadium: Padang SMK Seri Samudera

====== Second leg ======
18 October 2023	Atletico Manjung	0−3 ^{1}	TNB Janamanjung Kilat	Seri Manjung
15:00 UTC+8				Stadium: Padang SMK Seri Samudera

21 October 2023	Smesma Soccer	2−1	Manjung	Seri Manjung
16:15 UTC+8				Stadium: Padang SMK Seri Samudera

22 October 2023	Sitiawan City	2−1	Banjerona-Beruas	Seri Manjung
16:15 UTC+8				Stadium: Padang SMK Seri Samudera

22 October 2023	Lumut Wanderers	0−2	All Mix	Lekir
16:15 UTC+8				Stadium: Padang SMK Batu 10

^1 Atletico Manjung team not attend, TNBJ Kilat have been award 3 goals.

===== Semi-finals =====
====== First leg ======
4 November 2023	TNB Janamanjung Kilat	1−1	All Mix	Seri Manjung
16:15 UTC+8	Syarafi 38'		Irwan 45+2'	Stadium: SMK Seri Samudera Football Field

5 November 2023	Manjung	2−0	Sitiawan City	Seri Manjung
16:15 UTC+8	Ramiefarizf 15'; Syamil 80'			Stadium: SMK Seri Samudera Football Field

====== Second leg ======
11 November 2023	Sitiawan City	0−1	Manjung	Seri Manjung
16:15 UTC+8				Stadium: SMK Seri Samudera Football Field

11 November 2023	All Mix	0−1	TNB Janamanjung Kilat	Lekir
16:15 UTC+8				Stadium: Padang SMK Batu 10

===== Final =====
23 December 2023	Manjung	0−0 (6−7 p)	TNB Janamanjung Kilat	Seri Manjung
16:00 UTC+8				Stadium: MP Manjung Stadium

=== Perlis Super League ===
Perlis Super League
- Season: 2023
- Champions: Guar Syed Alwi
- Promoted: Guar Syed Alwi

==== Group Stage ====
===== Group A =====
Pos	Team	Pld	W	D	L	GF	GA	GD	Pts	Qualification or relegation
1	Lion Junior	6	6	0	0	21	4	+17	18	Advance to Knock-out stage
2	Anak Nelayan	6	3	2	1	9	8	+1	11	Advance to Knock-out stage
3	Kangar City	6	3	1	2	18	13	+5	10	
4	Tambun Tulang	6	2	3	1	8	8	0	9	
5	DB United	6	2	2	2	8	9	−1	8	
6	Cobra Utara Titi Tinggi	6	1	0	5	9	20	−11	3	
7	PTSS	6	0	0	6	7	20	−13	0	

Updated to match(es) played on 9 September 2023. Source: MSN Perlis
Rules for classification: 1) Points; 2) Goal difference; 3) Number of goals scored.

===== Group B =====
Pos	Team	Pld	W	D	L	GF	GA	GD	Pts	Qualification or relegation
1	Guar Syed Alwi F.C. (C)	6	5	1	0	12	1	+11	16	Advance to Knock-out stage & Promotion to al-ikhsan Cup
2	KSMR Kangar	6	4	2	0	14	5	+9	14	Advance to Knock-out stage
3	Legacy Edura Utara	6	3	2	1	11	8	+3	11	
4	Perlis Cops	6	2	1	3	12	13	−1	7	
5	Arau City	6	2	1	3	6	8	−2	7	
6	Padang Besar	6	1	1	4	5	14	−9	4	
7	Guar Gajah	6	0	0	6	2	13	−11	0	

Updated to match(es) played on 10 September 2023. Source: MSN Perlis
Rules for classification: 1) Points; 2) Goal difference; 3) Number of goals scored.
(C) Champions

===== Knock-out stage =====
Semifinals
A1	Lion Junior	3
B2	KSMR Kangar	2
B1	Guar Syed Alwi	1
A2	Anak Nelayan	0

Final
Lion Junior	0
Guar Syed Alwi	1

====== Semi-finals ======
16 September 2023	Lion Junior	3−2	KSMR Kangar	Kangar
16:15 UTC+8	Muhammad Faizal 12'; Farhan Hazim 39'; Irfan Nafis 60'		Mohd Asyraaf 3'; Mohd Faiz 90+4'	Stadium: Padang A, Kompleks Sukan Tuanku Syed Putra

17 September 2023	Guar Syed Alwi	1−0	Anak Nelayan	Kangar
16:15 UTC+8	Nor Mohd Hafiz 44'			Stadium: Padang A, Kompleks Sukan Tuanku Syed Putra

====== Final ======
30 September 2023	Lion Junior	0−1	Guar Syed Alwi	Kangar
20:45 UTC+8		Report	Arif Nadzman 70'	Stadium: Kompleks Sukan Tuanku Syed Putra

== South Zone ==
=== A-Ligue Nismilan ===
==== Group Stage ====
===== Group A (Kuala Pilah) =====
Pos	Team	Pld	W	D	L	GF	GA	GD	Pts	Qualification or relegation
1	N Nine	10	9	1	0	38	5	+33	28	Advance to knock-out stage
2	Ayrish (C)	10	6	3	1	30	9	+21	21	Advance to knock-out stage
3	PBD Kuala Pilah	10	5	2	3	15	12	+3	17	Advance to knock-out stage
4	Mixstars	10	4	1	5	24	19	+5	13	Advance to knock-out stage
5	Mantin Forest	10	2	1	7	8	40	−32	7	
6	GM	10	0	0	10	0	30	−30	0	

Updated to match(es) played on 10 September 2023. Source: A-Ligue
Rules for classification: 1) Points; 2) Goal difference; 3) Number of goals scored.
(C) Champions

===== Group B (Seremban) =====
Pos	Team	Pld	W	D	L	GF	GA	GD	Pts	Qualification or relegation
1	N9 Digital	8	6	1	1	17	5	+12	19	Advance to knock-out stage
2	Real Mambau F.C. (P)	8	5	2	1	19	7	+12	17	Advance to knock-out stage & Promotion to al-ikhsan Cup
3	Mafah	8	6	2	0	15	7	+8	17 (Note: MAFAH have been docked three points.)	Advance to knock-out stage
4	Revon City	8	5	0	3	22	6	+16	15	Advance to knock-out stage
5	KSRNS	8	4	1	3	21	9	+12	13	
6	MGK II	8	2	1	5	9	18	−9	7	
7	KGPD	8	2	1	5	13	29	−16	7	
8	Pantai	8	1	2	5	10	24	−14	5	
9	Southern	8	0	0	8	0	24	−24	0	

Updated to match(es) played on 10 September 2023. Source: A-Ligue
Rules for classification: 1) Points; 2) Goal difference; 3) Number of goals scored.
(P) Promoted

===== Knock-out stage =====
Quarter-finals
1A	N Nine	2	3	5
4B	Revon City	1	0	1
2B	Real Mambau	3	1	4
3A	PBD Kuala Pilah	0	1	1
1B	Ayrish	3	3	6
4A	Mafah	1	0	1
2A	N9 Digital	3	3	6
3B	Mixstars	0	1	1

Semi-finals
N Nine	3	1	4
Real Mambau	1	0	1
Ayrish	0	2	2
N9 Digital	0	1	1

Final
N. Nine	1 (1)
Ayrish	1 (3)
Third place play-off
Real Mambau	7
N9 Digital	2

===== Quarter-finals =====
====== First leg ======
17 September 2023	Mafah	1−3	Ayrish	Paroi
15:45 UTC+8				Stadium: Youth and Sports Complex Football Field

17 September 2023	Mixstars	0−3	N9 Digital	Kuala Pilah
15:45 UTC+8				Stadium: Mini Stadium Kuala Pilah

17 September 2023	Revon City	1−2	N. Nine	Paroi
17:15 UTC+8				Stadium: Youth and Sports Complex Football Field

17 September 2023	PBD Kuala Pilah	0−3	Real Mambau	Kuala Pilah
17:15 UTC+8				Stadium: Mini Stadium Kuala Pilah

====== Second leg ======
24 September 2023	Real Mambau	(4) 1−1 (1)	PBD Kuala Pilah	Paroi
15:00 UTC+8				Stadium: Youth and Sports Complex Football Field

24 September 2023	N. Nine	(5) 3−0 (1)	Revon City	Kuala Pilah
15:30 UTC+8				Stadium: SMK Tunku Muhammad

24 September 2023	N9 Digital	(6) 3−1 (1)	Mixstars	Paroi
16:40 UTC+8				Stadium: Youth and Sports Complex Football Field

24 September 2023	Ayrish	(6) 3−0 (1)	Mafah	Kuala Pilah
17:10 UTC+8				Stadium: SMK Tunku Muhammad

===== Semi-finals =====
====== First leg ======
30 September 2023	N. Nine	3−1	Real Mambau	Kuala Pilah
16:30 UTC+8				Stadium: Padang SSN Zaba

1 October 2023	Ayrish	0−0	N9 Digital	Kuala Pilah
16:30 UTC+8				Stadium: Kuala Pilah Mini Stadium

====== Second leg ======
7 October 2023	Real Mambau	(1) 0−1 (4)	N. Nine	Rahang
14:45 UTC+8				Stadium: PBNS Football Field

7 October 2023	N9 Digital	(1) 1−2 (2)	Ayrish	Rahang
16:30 UTC+8				Stadium: PBNS Football Field

====== Third place play-off ======
14 October 2023	Real Mambau	7−2	N9 Digital	Bandar Sri Sendayan
14:45 UTC+8				Stadium: Sendayan Air Base Mini Stadium

====== Final ======
14 October 2023	N. Nine	1-1 (1−3 p)	Ayrish (C)	Bandar Sri Sendayan
16:45 UTC+8				Stadium: Sendayan Air Base Mini Stadium

== See also ==
- 2023 Piala Sumbangsih
- 2023 Malaysia Super League
- 2023 Malaysia M3 League
- 2023 Malaysia M4 League
- 2023 Malaysia FA Cup
- 2023 Malaysia Cup
- 2023 MFL Challenge Cup
- 2023 MFL Cup
- 2023 Piala Presiden
