= Syed Yazid =

Malaysian businessman (born 1978)

Syed Yazid Syed Omar
- Born: 12 August 1978 (age 48); Kampong Bharu, Kuala Lumpur, Malaysia
- Citizenship: Malaysian
- Education: Northumbria University
- Occupation: Public Listed Co.
- Known for: Business and Sport (Football)

Syed Yazid Bin Syed Omar (born 12 August 1978) is a Malaysian with a background in business and finance. He also became an active in sports, and led him into wider into football organisation.

== Background ==
Syed Yazid was born at the General Hospital, Kuala Lumpur, Malaysia, graduated in International Business Administration which he gained from the University of Northumbria at Newcastle, United Kingdom.

Syed Yazid has been widely characterized as a reserved and unassuming individual, often being described as quiet and diligent. Not much is known about him and his tightly guarded private life aside from what’s known of his large charitable donations.

== Business ==
Currently, he has business interests in motoring – Proton and Fiat, constructions and industrials sector.

Syed Yazid also holds a position in MISC Swift Integrated Logistics as Director.

== Sport (football) ==
Syed Yazid's participation in the Malaysian football scene is evident with his high-profile positions and involvement in football-related associations. Syed Yazid was the Team Manager of the Kuala Lumpur FA which competed in 2013 Malaysia Youth Cup. He was a player for Kuala Lumpur FA and PDRM FA.

Syed Yazid also has joined KL Malay Mail, MK Land F.C and Selayang Municipal in M – League.

Position Holds:

Kuala Lumpur Football Association , President (2024–2028)

Amateur Football League, Board of Director (2021–2025)

Football Association of Malaysia , Executive Committee (2021–2025)

Kuala Lumpur City F.C , Board of Director

Kuala Lumpur Football Association , Vice President 1 (2019–2023)

Kuala Lumpur Football Association , Executive Committee (2014–2018)

Kuala Lumpur Malays FA, Acting President (2014–2016), Deputy President (2017–2019), (2020–2022), (2023–2025)

Team Managed :

- Sukma Games (2018) and (2024)

- Malaysia President's Cup (2018) and (2020)

- Sultan's Gold Cup (2016) and (2018)

- Malaysia Premier League (2015)

- Malaysia Youth Cup (2013) and (2014)

- Malaysia Super League (2021–2023) and (2024–2028)
