= Tentera Darat F.A. =

Malaysian football club

Tentera Darat
- Full name: Tentera Darat Football Association
- Nickname: The Army
- Short name: TDFA
- Founded: 2010; 16 years ago
- Ground: Football Pitch Batu Kontomen Camp, Kuala Lumpur
- Owner: Malaysian Army
- League: KLFA Super League
- 2026: KLFA Super League, 1st (Champions)
Home colours	Away colours

Tentera Darat Football Association (commonly known as Tentera Darat FA) is a Malaysian football club based at Kem Batu Kentomen in Kuala Lumpur. Operating under the umbrella of the Malaysian Armed Forces Football Association (AFFA), the club represents the Malaysian Army and competes in the KLFA Super League, part of the fourth-tier Malaysia A3 Community League.

== History ==
Tentera Darat Football Association was founded in 2010 as a dedicated football team for Malaysian Army personnel, serving as a developmental feeder club to the senior military side, Armed Forces F.C.. The club made its national debut in the 2011 Malaysia FAM League, finishing in third place, and repeated the feat in 2013.

In 2013, Tentera Darat FA made its inaugural appearance in the Malaysia FA Cup, defeating Shahzan Muda F.C. in the first round, before being eliminated by Pahang. Following the restructuring of Malaysian lower-tier leagues, the club transitioned to the regional Kuala Lumpur League pyramid, where it established itself as one of the dominant sides winning the top-flight Kuala Lumpur title in 2017–18, 2023, 2024–25, and 2026, alongside the KLFA Cup triumph in 2024–25.

== Season by season record ==
Season	Division	Position	Malaysia Cup	Malaysian FA Cup	Malaysian Charity Shield	Regional	Top scorer (all competitions)
2011	Liga FAM	third place	DNQ	DNQ	–	–	None
2012	Liga FAM	Fifth place	DNQ	DNQ	–	–	None
2013	Liga FAM	Third place	DNQ	Second round	–	–	None
2017–18	Kuala Lumpur League	Winners	DNQ	DNQ	–	–	None
2019	Kuala Lumpur League	Fourth place	DNQ	DNQ	–	–	None
2020 2021 ^{1}	Kuala Lumpur League	Season abandoned	DNQ	DNQ	–	–	None
2023	Kuala Lumpur M5 League	Runners-up	DNQ	DNQ	–	–	None
2024–25	KLFA Super League	Winners	DNQ	DNQ	–	–	None
2026	KLFA Super League	Winners	DNQ	DNQ	–	–	None

Champions	Runners-up	Third place	Promoted	Relegated

Notes:'

^12020 & 2021 season cancelled due to the COVID-19 pandemic, no promotion or league title was awarded.

== Honours ==
=== Domestic ===
League

- Division 5/KLFA Super League

(gold) Winners (3): 2017–18, 2023, 2024–25, 2026

- Division 5/KLFA M5 League

(silver) Runners-up (1): 2023

- Division 3/FAM League

(bronze) Third place (2): 2011, 2013

Cup

- KLFA FA Cup

(gold) Winners (1): 2024–25

== See also ==
- Armed Forces F.C.
- Malaysian Armed Forces Football Association
- Kuala Lumpur League
