= Kuala Lumpur League =

Malaysia state level football league

- Founded: 1929; 97 years ago
- Country: Malaysia
- Confederation: AFC
- Divisions: 3
- Number of clubs: 64
- Level on pyramid: 4–6
- Promotion to: Malaysia A2 Amateur League
- Domestic cup(s): Malaysia FA Cup; KLFA Cup

Kuala Lumpur League is a state level football league held in Kuala Lumpur. The league is managed by the KLFA. It is the fourth to sixth tier football league in Malaysia. Fourth tier is part of the Malaysia A3 Community League. Teams are also eligible to compete in the Malaysia FA Cup.

The league has a hierarchical format with promotion and relegation between different divisions. Starting from 2018, promotion to the newly established fourth-tier Malaysia M4 League was also possible.

== Current teams ==
Below are the member teams of the Kuala Lumpur FA League for the 2026 season.

=== KLFA Super League ===
- DBKL
- Kg. Ku Kampung Baru
- PULAPOL
- Putera Bandar
- RSC Panthera
- Smart Focus
- Tentera Darat
- Uni KL
- VI Dragon City

=== KLFA Premier League Division 1 ===
- Bandar Tun Razak
- Bomba KL
- Cheras City United
- Estaletta
- Gerakan KL
- JLJ FC
- Kilat KL TNB
- Klan Kreatif
- Kosas
- KPJ Healthcare
- Matrix Partner
- Pilihan Segambut
- RAJD FC
- Red Beret
- Soccer Lembah Pantai
- Starjets
- Subang Nova
- Tanjong Malim Thunder
- The Gathers
- Zuhas

=== KLFA Premier League Division 2 ===
- Bitara Jaya BTR
- BSP FC
- Bukit Bandaraya A
- Bukit Bandaraya B
- CIMB YFA Bintang Merah
- Fathul Karib
- Keramat Warrior
- Kerinchi
- Kg. Ku Kg. Baru Academy
- KL Rovers Academy
- KLFA A Academy
- KLFA B Academy
- Putera Bandar Academy
- Smart Focus Academy
- SRABSP Gators
- Sungai Merab
- Tanjong Malim Thunder Academy
- Tasaja Wembely
- WRA FC
- X-Warriors

== List of champions ==
=== Super League ===
Edition	Season	Champions	Runners-up	Score
1.	2017–18	Tentera Darat	Jaringan Melayu Malaysia FC	
2.	2019	DRB-Hicom	Imigresen	
3.	2020–21	Not held due to the COVID-19 pandemic		
4.	2022	PULAPOL	Imigresen II	
5.	2023	Tentera Darat	Smart Focus FC	3–1
6.	2024–25	Tentera Darat	PULAPOL F.C.	N/A
7.	2026	Tentera Darat	Kg Ku II	N/A

Notes:'

2020 & 2021 season cancelled due to the COVID-19 pandemic, no promotion or league title was awarded.

=== Premier League Division 1 ===
Edition	Season	Champions	Runners-up	Score in final
1.	2017–18	DRB-Hicom	PULAPOL	2–1
2.	2022	KSRF Felda	Klan Kreatif	1–0
3.	2023	RAJD FC	KL Rovers II	2–1
4.	2024–25	Cochrane Hunters	KL Youth	–
5.	2026	Estaletta FC	Matrix Partner FC	0–0 (3–1) Penalty Shootout

=== Premier League Division 2 ===
Edition	Season	Champions	Runners-up	Score in final
1.	2017–18	Paya FC	Gerakan KL FC	4–0
2.	2022	Setapak Jaya	Raja Muda Rovers	6–2
3.	2023	Not held		
4.	2024–25	Kg Ku II	Akademi PDRM FC	2–2 (7–6) Penalty Shootout
5.	2026	BSP FC	KL Rovers Academy FC	1–0

=== KLFA Cup ===
Edition	Season	Champions	Runners-up	Score in final
1.	2017–18	Kilat KL	PULAPOL	2–1
2.	2022	JLJD	Sungai Merab	
3.	2023	JLJD	DRB-Hicom F.C.	1–1 (4–2) Penalty Shootout
4.	2024–25	Tentera Darat	PULAPOL	0–0 (4–2) Penalty Shootout
5.	2026	Kilat FC	Kg Ku II	3–2
