= Kuala Lumpur Football Association =

Governing body of football in Kuala Lumpur, Malaysia

Kuala Lumpur Football Association (KLFA)
- Abbreviation: KLFA
- Formation: 1975; 51 years ago
- Purpose: Football association
- Headquarters: Tingkat 1, Stadium Bolasepak Kuala Lumpur, Jalan Yaacob Latif, Bandar Tun Razak, Cheras, 56000 Kuala Lumpur
- Location: Bandar Tun Razak, Kuala Lumpur
- President: Syed Yazid bin Syed Omar
- General Secretary: Nokman Mustaffa
- Website: Official website

Kuala Lumpur Football Association, also known as Kuala Lumpur FA or simply KLFA (Malay: Persatuan Bola Sepak Kuala Lumpur), is a state football association that supervises the football activities in the Federal Territory of Malaysia of Kuala Lumpur. The association was formed in 1975.

== History ==
Kuala Lumpur Football Association (KLFA) as Federal Territory Football Association (FTFA) with Hamzah Abu Samah elected as first president. The association was a breakaway group from the FA Selangor. Led by former Selangor secretary K. Rasalingam, together with Goh Ah Chai, Hamzah Muhammad, M.J. Vincent, Shariff Mustafa, Jeswant Singh and Manickarajah, they saw the need for another association in the Klang Valley due to the growing numbers of clubs. Aftet Hamzah, the FTFA deputy president Tengku Ahmad Rithauddeen took over in 1977. It was that the KLFA organised first league, with 30 clubs divided into the Dunhill League, Bandaraya (City) League, First Division, Second Division, Third Division, Reserve League and Government Departments and Business House League.

The following year, the FTFA was represented at the national level for the first time when they competed in the Razak Cup (under-18). It was in 1979 that the Federal Territory made their debut in the Malaysia Cup. In 1984, Tengku Ahmad Rithauddeen stepped down as president and Elyas Omar was elected as the third president of the association.

FTFA officially changed its name to Kuala Lumpur Football Association (KLFA) in 1987 to better identify itself with the city. Leadership kept changing after Elyas stepped down, with Megat Junid Megat Ayub taking over. At the 2014 congress, Astaman Abdul Aziz stepped down and the Federal Territories Ministry secretary general Adnan Md Ikhsan was elected the president, while Astaman and Izudin Ishak became the deputy presidents. The Association is known internationally for having hosted the Inter-City Tournament for several years. Among the participating countries were Czechoslovakia, England, Austria, Australia, Germany, Turkey, and Indonesia.

About 70 clubs are affiliated members of the KLFA. These clubs are divided into three divisions, namely the Premier, Division 1, and Division 2.

== Association management ==
| Positions | Name |
|---|---|
| President | (Malaysia) Syed Yazid bin Syed Omar |
| Deputy president | (Malaysia) Datuk Kamaruddin bin Haji Hassan |
| Deputy president | (Malaysia) Dato' Seri Wong Yeon Chai |
| Vice presidents | (Malaysia) Datuk Ramlan bin Shahean Askolani |
| Vice presidents | (Malaysia) Nor Asyikin binti Jaafar |
| Vice presidents | (Malaysia) Datuk Sham Shamrat Sen Gupta |
| Vice presidents | (Malaysia) Senator Datuk Haji Hisamudin bin Yahya |
| General secretary | (Malaysia) Encik Nokman bin Mustaffa |
| Treasurer | (Malaysia) |
| Executive committee | (Malaysia) Muhammad Hanafi bin Jamaluddin |
| Executive committee | (Malaysia) Amir Mahmood bin Abdul Razak |
| Executive committee | (Malaysia) Mohd Zushaidey bin Zulkifli |
| Executive committee | (Malaysia) Mohd Faizul bin Mohd Nor |
| Executive committee | (Malaysia) Mohd Fadil bin Taib |
| Executive committee | (Malaysia) Mohd Ismirul Azlan bin Ismail |
| Executive committee | (Malaysia) Abdullah Izhar bin Mohamed Yusof |
| Executive committee | (Malaysia) Dato' Mohamed Rozhan bin Mohd Ghazali |
| Executive committee | (Malaysia) Khairul Azuan bin Abd Ghani |
| Executive committee | (Malaysia) Abdullah bin Abdul Hamid |

== Former presidents ==
- 1975–1977: Hamzah Abu Samah
- 1977–1984: Tengku Ahmad Rithauddeen Tengku Ismail
- 1984–1996: Elyas Omar
- 1996–2003: Megat Junid Megat Ayub
- 2010–2014: Astaman Abdul Aziz
- 2014–2019: Adnan Md Ikhsan
- 2019–2024: Khalid Abdul Samad

== KLFA Academy Football Centre ==
KLFA Academy Football Centre is the training ground and academy base of the KLFA and the Football Association of Malaysia. Located in the township of Taman Melawati, it covers 3.28 hectares. The facility has a futsal court, gymnasium, cafeteria and dormitories. The RM5.4 million academy opened in March 2012.

== Main competitions ==
- KLFA Division 1 League
- KLFA FA Cup

== Notable members ==
Notable clubs in the league competitions affiliated to the Kuala Lumpur Football Association include:

- Kuala Lumpur City F.C.
- Kuala Lumpur Rovers F.C.
- Kampong Ku F.C.
- Kuala Lumpur Rangers F.C.
- DBKL S.C.
- UM-Damansara United
- Armed Forces F.C.
- KL City Futsal
- Kuala Lumpur FA Women's football team
