= 2017–18 Kuala Lumpur League =

The 2017–18 season is the 89th season of the Kuala Lumpur League, which is a Malaysian football competition featuring semi-professional and amateur clubs from Kuala Lumpur. JMM FC are the defending champions.

== Teams ==
For 2017–18 season, there are 62 teams will compete in the league, including 48 sides from the Division 1 and Division 2. Top two team from the Super League will promoted to Malaysia M4 League for 2019 season.

== Super League ==
Kuala Lumpur League Super League
- Season: 2017–18

=== League table ===
Pos	Team	Pld	W	D	L	GF	GA	GD	Pts	Promotion, qualification or relegation
1	Tentera Darat	9	9	0	0	21	3	+18	27	Promotion to Malaysia M4 League
2	Jaringan Melayu Malaysia	10	8	1	1	35	11	+24	25	
3	Kilat KL	9	7	1	1	21	9	+12	22	
4	Marcerra United	8	6	1	1	26	1	+25	19	
5	PDRM III	9	5	2	2	16	10	+6	17	
6	JLJ Diraja	11	4	1	6	13	13	0	13	
7	JJ Football Academy	7	3	1	3	13	14	−1	10	
8	UNIKL FC	9	3	1	5	7	25	−18	10	
9	Imigresen	9	3	0	6	14	18	−4	9	
10	UiTM	10	3	0	7	7	32	−25	9	
11	Felda United F.C.	10	2	2	6	12	20	−8	8	
12	Bukit Bandaraya	8	2	1	5	13	17	−4	7	
13	Permata United	8	2	1	5	10	17	−7	7	Relegation to Division 1
14	Victoria FC	10	0	2	8	12	36	−24	2	Relegation to Division 1

Updated to match(es) played on 27 July 2018. Source: KLFA
Rules for classification: 1) Points; 2) Goal difference; 3) Number of goals scored.

== Division 1 ==
Kuala Lumpur League Division 1
- Season: 2017–18
- Champions: DRB-Hicom
- Promoted: DRB-Hicom; Pulapol FC
- Relegated: BMU Titiwangsa; Pewaris FC

=== League table ===
==== Group A ====
Pos	Team	Pld	W	D	L	GF	GA	GD	Pts	Promotion, qualification or relegation
1	DRB- Hicom (C, P)	11	9	1	1	36	7	+29	28	Promotion to Super League
2	Ampang Kosas	11	8	1	2	28	10	+18	25	
3	KOR RRD	11	7	3	1	27	11	+16	24	
4	Felcra HQ	11	7	2	2	42	14	+28	23	
5	SSN KL	10	5	3	2	15	8	+7	18	
6	Putra Tigers	10	6	0	4	26	22	+4	18	
7	Hospital KL	11	5	3	3	27	24	+3	18	
8	PPUKM FC	11	4	0	7	18	35	−17	12	
9	Invictus FC	11	2	2	7	16	27	−11	8	
10	Universiti Malaya	11	1	3	7	9	28	−19	6	
11	Cochrane Hunters	11	2	0	9	12	31	−19	6	
12	BMU Titiwangsa (R)	11	0	0	11	5	44	−39	0	Relegation to Division 2

Updated to match(es) played on 27 July 2018. Source: KLFA
Rules for classification: 1) Points; 2) Goal difference; 3) Number of goals scored.
(C) Champions; (P) Promoted; (R) Relegated

==== Group B ====
Pos	Team	Pld	W	D	L	GF	GA	GD	Pts	Promotion, qualification or relegation
1	PULAPOL FC (P)	11	10	1	0	43	8	+35	31	Promotion to Super League
2	Petaling Putra	10	9	1	0	36	13	+23	28	
3	TUDM Hornet FC	11	9	0	2	33	16	+17	27	
4	Bank Rakyat	10	7	0	3	23	13	+10	21	
5	Chandik FC	10	5	1	4	30	23	+7	16	
6	Kampongku F.C.	10	4	2	4	21	18	+3	14	
7	PLUS FC	11	4	1	6	23	29	−6	13	
8	CCCP FC	11	4	1	6	21	26	−5	13	
9	Estaletta FC	9	2	1	6	8	22	−14	7	
10	Sime Darby	10	2	0	8	24	28	−4	6	
11	Fathul Karib	11	1	0	10	7	29	−22	3	
12	Pewaris FC (R)	11	0	2	9	7	29	−22	2	Relegation to Division 2

Updated to match(es) played on 22 July 2018. Source: KLFA
Rules for classification: 1) Points; 2) Goal difference; 3) Number of goals scored.
(P) Promoted; (R) Relegated

=== Bracket ===
Quarter-finals
PULAPOL	3
Felcra HQ	1
Kosas Chendana	0
TUDM Hornet	2
Petaling Putra	2
KOR RRD	0
DRB Hicom	2
Bank Rakyat	2

Semi -finals
PULAPOL	2
TUDM Hornet	2
Petaling Putra	1
DRB Hicom	2

Final
PULAPOL	1
DRB Hicom	2

=== Quarter-finals ===
October 2018
16:00 UTC+8

PULAPOL	3–1	Felcra HQ

October 2018
16:00 UTC+8

Kosas Chendana	0–2	TUDM Hornet

October 2018
16:00 UTC+8

Petaling Putra	2–0	KOR RRD

October 2018
16:00 UTC+8

DRB-Hicom	2–2	Bank Rakyat

=== Semi-finals ===
20 October 2018
16:15 UTC+8

PULAPOL	2–2	TUDM Hornet

Padang Pudu Ulu

21 October 2018
16:15 UTC+8

Petaling Putra	1–2	DRB-Hicom

Padang Pudu Ulu

=== Final ===
3 November 2018
20:30 UTC+8

PULAPOL	1−2	DRB-Hicom

KLFA Stadium
