= 2019 Kuala Lumpur League =

The 2019 season is the 90th season of the KLFA League, which is a Malaysian football competition featuring semi-professional and amateur clubs from Kuala Lumpur. Tentera Darat FA are the defending champions.

== Super League ==
KLFA League Super League
- Season: 2019
- Champions: DRB-HICOM FC

=== League table ===
Pos	Team	Pld	W	D	L	GF	GA	GD	Pts	Promotion, qualification or relegation
1	Immigration F.C.	9	7	0	2	24	10	+14	21	Qualification to play-offs M3 League
2	Cheras Perdana (Q)	9	6	2	1	20	9	+11	20	Qualification to play-offs M3 League
3	DRB-Hicom	9	6	2	1	17	7	+10	20	
4	Tentera Darat	9	5	3	1	23	9	+14	18	
5	Kilat KL	9	5	3	1	16	5	+11	18	
6	JLJ Diraja	9	3	3	3	18	14	+4	12	
7	TUDM Hornets	9	2	1	6	14	22	−8	7	
8	PLUS	9	2	1	6	7	18	−11	7	
9	BSN (R)	9	1	1	7	7	28	−21	4	Relegation to Division 1
10	Panthers United (R)	9	0	0	9	4	29	−25	0	Relegation to Division 1

Source: KLFA Super League
Rules for classification: 1) Points; 2) Goal difference; 3) Number of goals scored.
(Q) Qualified for the phase indicated; (R) Relegated

== Division 1 ==
KLFA League Division 1
- Season: 2017–18
