= Mohd Hisamudin Yahaya =

Malaysian political activist (born 1972)

Yang Berhormat Senator Datuk Mohd Hisamudin Yahaya PMW
- محمّد حسام الدين يحيى

Senator Appointed by the Yang di-Pertuan Agong

Representing Putrajaya
- Incumbent
- Assumed office 4 October 2021
- Monarchs: Abdullah (2021–2024); Ibrahim Iskandar (since 2024)
- Prime Minister: Ismail Sabri Yaakob (2021–2022); Anwar Ibrahim (since 2022)

Executive Member of Football Association of Malaysia
- Incumbent
- Assumed office 2021

Personal details
- Born: Mohd Hisamudin bin Yahaya; 30 September 1972 (age 53) Parit, Perak
- Party: United Malays National Organisation (UMNO)
- Other political affiliations: Barisan Nasional (BN)

Datuk Mohd Hisamudin bin Yahaya is a Malaysian politician who has served as the Senator representing Putrajaya since October 2021. He is a member and the Division Vice Chief of Putrajaya of the United Malays National Organisation (UMNO), a component party of the Barisan Nasional (BN) coalition.

At present, YB Senator Datuk Mohd Hisamudin bin Yahaya has been elected successfully by the board of FAM to be the Executive Member of the Football Association of Malaysia (FAM) for the term of 2021 to 2025. Besides that, Datuk also being appointed as the Deputy Chairman of the Futsal and Beach Soccer Committee, Deputy Chairman of the Sponsorship and Marketing Committee, as well as the Malaysian Football League (MFL) Board Member for this term of 2021–2025. On 12 October 2024, Datuk Mohd Hisamudin was elected as one of the Vice President of Kuala Lumpur Football Association (KLFA) for the term of 2024 to 2028, as well as the President of the Futsal and Beach Soccer Committee of KLFA for the same term.

For the past term of 2017–2021, YB Senator Datuk was appointed as one of the Executive Committee Members of FAM, held position of the Deputy Chairman of the Sports Medical Committee and Competitions Committee of FAM (2017-2021). He was the Manager of the Kuala Lumpur Football Association (KLFA) for the term of 2015 to 2017. Before that, he was the President of the Putrajaya Football Team from 2014 to 2015 and the same year he was appointed as the Executive Member of Majlis Sukan Wilayah Persekutuan.

YB Senator Datuk Mohd Hisamudin bin Yahaya was the Press Secretary (2013–2018) for the Minister of Federal Territories, YB Datuk Seri Utama Tengku Adnan Bin Tengku Mansor. He was one of the EXCO members of UMNO Youth Malaysia for the term of 2008 to 2011. Besides that, he had been appointed as the Deputy Chief of UMNO Youth Putrajaya Branch (2008–2011), Secretary of the Membership and Election Bureau of UMNO Malaysia (2008–2011), and the Chairman of the Membership and Election Bureau of UMNO Youth Malaysia (2008–2011).

On 29 November 2017, YB Senator Datuk Hisamudin vocally voiced out the unreasonable request from 'insane people' in response to the actions of certain quarters that urged Tunku Ismail to resign even though he had not been in charge for a year as the President of FAM. In fact, he also described the move as unreasonable and was not the best solution to restore the nation's football glory.

YB Senator Datuk Mohd Hisamudin Yahaya is also actively involved in Non-Governmental Organisation (NGO) and charity work locally and internationally.

== Personal life ==
YB Senator Datuk Mohd Hisamudin bin Yahaya was born in 1972 and raised in Parit, Perak, Malaysia. He is married and resides in Bandar Tun Razak, Kuala Lumpur.

== Education ==
A native of Parit, Perak, completed his primary and secondary education from January 1979 to December 1991 at Sekolah Kebangsaan Padang Tenggala Bota Kanan (Primary), Sekolah Menengah Datuk Abdul Rahman Yaakub Bota (Secondary) and later Sekolah Menengah Iskandar Shah (Secondary) all in Parit Perak. He completed his school studies after obtaining his Sijil Tinggi Persekolahan Malaysia.

After obtaining his STPM results, he continued to further his studies in Swansea Institute of Higher Education or now known as Swansea Metropolitan University graduated in 1997.

YB Senator Datuk Mohd Hisamudin bin Yahaya pursued a bachelor's degree in business administration from Universiti Putra Malaysia in 2002.

== Experiences ==
YB Senator Datuk Mohd Hisamudin bin Yahaya was the Press Secretary for the Minister of Tourism, YB Datuk Seri Utama Tengku Adnan Tengku Mansor from 2006 to 2008 and 2013–2018. Before joined the Ministry, he was the Customer Support Senior Executive for Bernama from year 1994 to 2006.

In 2012, YB Senator Datuk Mohd Hisamudin Yahaya had been represented the UMNO Youth Malaysia to attend the 7th General Assembly (GA) of the International Conference of Asian Political Parties (ICAPP), which held in Azerbaijan from 21 to 24 November 2012. He delivered a speech during the Special Workshop for the Young Political Leaders on 23 November 2012, focusing on the role of identifying and managing change amidst the extraordinary challenges of the political scenario in Malaysia by highlighting Malaysia's current challenges and how Malaysian – as a community– working together to achieve a better nation.

== UMNO Youth EXCO ==
As an UMNO Youth Exco Member, Datuk Mohd Hisamudin Yahaya was vocal in expressing his views and a competent critic of the UMNO Youth leadership.

In one particular incident, Datuk Mohd Hisamudin Yahaya called upon all UMNO of whom was from the Galas parliament to back home and vote for Barisan Nasional in the 2010 Galas by-election.

== Media officer in international and local events ==
Datuk Mohd Hisamudin Yahaya was involved in many international sports events. He was the Media Relation Manager for the Hanoi 2003 Southeast Asian Games, Kuala Lumpur 2001 Southeast Asian Games, Brunei 1999 Southeast Asian Games and the Kuala Lumpur 1998 Commonwealth Games.

=== List of other participated events ===
2005

- 11th ASEAN Summit.
- 6th Conference of Ministers of Information of Non-Aligned Countries.(COMINAC)
- 30th Annual Meeting of The Board of Governors of the Islamic Development Bank (IDB)
- Non-Aligned Movement (NAM) Ministerial Meeting of The Advancement of Women

2004

- Langkawi International Dialog (LID)
- Ministerial Meeting of the Non-Aligned (NAM) Committee on Palestine
- Special Meeting on the Middle East-OIC
- Commonwealth Tourism Minister' Meeting

2003

- World Conference of Islamic Scholars
- The XII NAM Summit Conference
- The OIC 10th Summit

2002

- The 7th Waqaf Conference
- Langkawi International Dialogue (LID)

2001

- OIC Tourism Conference

2000

- International Conference Foreign Minister
- Langkawi International Dialogue

== Honours ==
- Federal Territory (Malaysia)
  - Commander of the Order of the Territorial Crown (PMW) – Datuk (2016)
