= DRB-Hicom F.C. =

Malaysian football club

DRB-HICOM FC
- Full name: DRB-HICOM Football Club
- Nickname(s): The Great Bees
- Founded: 2008; 17 years ago as Pos Malaysia FC
- Ground: Glenmarie
- Owner: DRB-HICOM
- President: Mahmood Abdul Razak
- League: KLFA Super League
- 2023: Semi-finalist
- Website: http://www.drb-hicom.com

DRB-HICOM Football Club is a Malaysian football club. They played in the Malaysia Premier League from 2010 to 2016. DRB-HICOM FC as reserve team remained competing in the Kuala Lumpur Football Association (KLFA) League, where they have played since 2014. This team is mostly composed of employees of DRB-HICOM Group of Companies.

The club is commonly known as The Great Bees (D'GreatBees), and previously used the 3,000 capacity Proton City Stadium in Tanjung Malim as their official home ground. However, since it now plays in the Klang Valley, DRB-HICOM FC is now based in Glenmarie, Shah Alam.

== History ==
The club was established in 2008 as Pos Malaysia Football Club, by the national postal company Pos Malaysia Berhad. In 2011, DRB-HICOM acquired them from Khazanah Nasional, and in 2012 efforts began to adopt the DRB-HICOM brand as the club's name. This was finalised in 2014.

== Club's names ==
- Pos Football Club
- DRB-HICOM Football Club (DRB-HICOM FC)

== Kit manufacturer and shirt sponsor ==
Season	Manufacturer	Sponsor
2010	Lotto	TM
2011–2012	Eider	Pos Malaysia
2013	Kappa	Pos Malaysia; DRB-HICOM
2014	Custom made	Pos Malaysia; DRB-HICOM
2015–2017	Mizuno	DRB-HICOM
2018	Skyhawk	DRB-HICOM
2019	Skyhawk	CTRM
2022–2023	Skyhawk	DRB-HICOM
2024–	Skyhawk	Sonic Boom

== Club officials ==
Position	Name
President	(Malaysia) Mahmood Razak Bahman
Vice president	(Malaysia) David Azzuddin Buxton
Secretary general	(Malaysia) Mohamad Rofizan Abdul Rahman
Treasurer	(Malaysia) Tengku Nu' Aim Aiman Tg Mad Ameen
Manager	(Malaysia) Noorhardly Muhamad

== Club staff ==
Position	Name
Head coach	(Malaysia) Fisol Abdul Razak
Assistant coach	(Malaysia) Mohammad Firdaus Abdul Ghani
Goalkeeper coach	(Malaysia) Saharuddin Marzuki
Physiotherapist	(Malaysia) Muhammad Faizal Ghazali
Kitman	(Malaysia) Muhammad Syafiq Mohd Ali

== Coaching list ==
Year	Head coach
2009	(Malaysia) Mohd Anizam Daud
2010–2010	(Malaysia) Lim Kok Onn
2010–2011	(Malaysia) Mat Zan Mat Aris
2012–2014	(Malaysia) G. Torairaju
Dec 2014–Feb 2015	(Australia) Marshall Soper
Feb 2015–2016	(Malaysia) Chong Yee Fatt
2016	(Malaysia) Razak A Majid
2017	(Malaysia) Razak A Majid
2019–2024	(Malaysia) Fisol Abdul Razak

== Honours ==
=== Domestic competitions ===
- Malaysia FAM League
  - Champion: 2009
- KLFA Division 1 League
  - Champion: 2017–18
- KLFA Super League
  - Champion: 2019
