= Kampong Ku F.C. =

Malaysian football club

Kampong Ku
- Full name: Kampong Ku Football Club
- Short name: KGKU
- Founded: 2013; 13 years ago
- Ground: Jalan Raja Muda Abdul Aziz Mini Stadium; Rhino Arena
- Capacity: 3,500
- Head coach: Rizwan Ahmad
- League: Malaysia A2 Amateur League
- Website: Official website
| Home colours | Away colours |

Kampong Ku Football Club (commonly known as KGKU FC) is a Malaysian football club based in Kampung Baru, Kuala Lumpur. Founded in 2013, the club represents the historic Kampung Baru community. They currently compete in the Malaysia A2 Amateur League, the third tier of the Malaysian football league system.

== History ==
=== Early Years and State League Rise (2013–2019) ===
Kampong Ku FC was established in 2013 and initially participated in grassroots regional competitions across Kuala Lumpur under the jurisdiction of the Kuala Lumpur Football Association (KLFA). Built on a structural philosophy of community-led volunteerism and cooperation (gotong-royong), the club worked its way up through the KLFA League pyramid.

During the 2015–16 season, Kampong Ku secured a second-place finish in the KLFA League Division 2. By the 2017–18 campaign, they consolidated their position in the top tier of state football, concluding the season in 6th place in KLFA Division 1. The club's first major piece of silverware arrived in 2019 when they were crowned champions of the KLFA League Division 1.

=== Pandemic and Regional Dominance (2020–2023) ===
The club's upward trajectory faced an unexpected halt during the 2020 and 2021 seasons, which were completely cancelled and declared null and void by the KLFA due to the disruptions caused by the COVID-19 pandemic.

Upon the resumption of competitive football in 2022, Kampong Ku finished 3rd in the KLFA Super League. The breakthrough moment for the club arrived in 2023 when they entered the newly-structured KLFA M5 League. Delivering a dominant campaign, Kampong Ku FC finished as champions of the M5 tier. This victory earned the club automatic promotion to the national stage for the following season.

=== National Tier: Malaysia A2 Amateur League (2024–present) ===
Promoted to the Malaysia A2 Amateur League for the 2024–25 season, the club quickly proved its competitiveness at the national level. In their debut season in the third tier, they advanced out of the group stages to reach the national playoff quarter-finals, where they were eliminated by Guar Syed Alwi FC. Striker Ridhwan Johan finished as the team's top goalscorer with 8 goals across all competitions.

In the subsequent 2025–26 season, the club was placed in the highly competitive Central Zone, finishing in 3rd place with Ridhwan Johan once again leading the front line with 6 goals. In September 2026, Kampong Ku FC reached the final of the local FA Cup PBKL 2026, where they faced Kilat FC at Padang Kilat TNB in Bangsar.

== Stadium ==
The club plays its home matches at the Jalan Raja Muda Abdul Aziz Mini Stadium (popularly referred to as the Rhino Arena) located in Kampung Baru, Kuala Lumpur. The stadium features a synthetic turf pitch and has an official spectator capacity of 3,500.

== Players ==
=== Current squad ===
As of November 2026

Note: Flags indicate national team as defined under FIFA eligibility rules; some limited exceptions apply. Players may hold more than one non-FIFA nationality.

| No. | Pos. | Nation | Player |
|---|---|---|---|
| 1 | GK | MAS | Aiman Arif Abdul Ghani |
| 2 | DF | MAS | Syzwan Mohd Rani |
| 3 | DF | MAS | Rasyidi Muhammd Rafi |
| 4 | DF | MAS | Hafizi Shari |
| 5 | DF | MAS | Adam Amirul Danish^{U22} |
| 6 | MF | MAS | Azrul Razman (captain) |
| 7 | MF | MAS | Ammar Shafiq Riduan |
| 8 | MF | MAS | Hafizi Abdul Halim |
| 9 | MF | MAS | Maximillian Hanifa Jabbar^{U22} |
| 10 | MF | MAS | Azizie Hamid^{U22} |
| 11 | MF | MAS | Sufi Amar Zul Amin |
| 12 | DF | MAS | Syawal Hakimi Omar |
| 14 | MF | MAS | Syed Muhammad Ashraf |

| No. | Pos. | Nation | Player |
|---|---|---|---|
| 16 | MF | MAS | Rudi Hasun |
| 17 | FW | MAS | Asyraaf Fadzli^{U22} |
| 19 | FW | MAS | Ridhwan Johan |
| 21 | MF | MAS | Hamizan Hamzah |
| 22 | MF | MAS | Alif Izwan Ab Razak |
| 23 | DF | MAS | Saiful Safaiz Abdul Rahman |
| 24 | GK | MAS | Nor Azmi Mustafa |
| 25 | FW | MAS | Qhaliff Rayyan^{U22} |
| 27 | DF | MAS | Brandon Tamma |
| 30 | GK | MAS | Aidil Iskandar Anuar |
| 42 | DF | MAS | Firdaus Hasnoddin |
| 55 | DF | MAS | Amir Hazman Hanapiah^{U22} |
| 88 | MF | MAS | Danish Norhafizam |

== Management ==
As of 13 November 2026

| Position | Name |
|---|---|
| Team manager | (Malaysia) Ahmad Tarmizi bin Kamarudin |
| Assistant manager | (Malaysia) Muhd Faiz Ramly |
| Head coach | (Malaysia) Hamdan Ibrahim |
| Assistant coach | (Malaysia) Rizwan Ahmad |
| Goalkeeper coach | (Malaysia) Muhammad Anwar Saaban |
| Fitness coach | (Malaysia) Mohd Fauzan bin Yunos |
| Physio | (Malaysia) Mohammad Zakhwan Abu Bakar |
| Team admin | (Malaysia) Mohd Heazry Ismail (Malaysia) Hazim Raziq bin Halim (Malaysia) Mohd Zamani Yunos (Malaysia) Imran Omar (Malaysia) Mohd Zuhde Shah Talib |
| Team media | (Malaysia) Asnoor Haidi bin Ismail |
| Kitman | (Malaysia) Faisal Kamal |

== Season by season record ==
| Champions | Runners-up | Third place | Promoted | Relegated |

| Season | Division | Position | Malaysia Cup | Malaysian FA Cup | Malaysian Charity Shield | Regional | Top scorer (all competitions) |
|---|---|---|---|---|---|---|---|
| 2017–18 | KLFA League Division 1 | 6th place | DNQ | DNQ | DNQ | DNQ | |
| 2019 | KLFA League Division 1 | unknown | DNQ | DNQ | DNQ | DNQ | |
| 2020 & 2021 | Kuala Lumpur League | | cancelled and declared null and void due to COVID-19 pandemic | | | | |
| 2022 | KLFA Super League | 3rd place | DNQ | DNQ | DNQ | DNQ | |
| 2023 | KLFA M5 League | Champion | DNQ | DNQ | DNQ | DNQ | |
| 2024–25 | A2 Amateur League | Quarter-finals | DNQ | DNQ | DNQ | DNQ | (Malaysia) Ridhwan Johan (8) |
| 2025–26 | A2 Amateur League | 3rd (Central Zone) | DNQ | DNQ | DNQ | DNQ | (Malaysia) Ridhwan Johan (6) |

Notes:'

^1 Season cancelled due to the COVID-19 pandemic.

== Honours ==
=== League ===
- KLFA M5 League
  - (gold) Champions (1): 2023
- KLFA League Division 1
  - (gold) Champions (1): 2019
- KLFA League Division 2
  - (silver) Runners-up (1): 2015–16

=== Cup ===
- FA Cup PBKL
  - (silver) Runners-up (1): 2026
