= PULAPOL F.C. =

Malaysian football club

PULAPOL
- Full name: Pusat Latihan Polis Football Club
- Nickname: The Cops II
- Founded: 2019; 7 years ago, as Semarak FC
- Ground: Police Training Centre Football Arena
- Owner: Royal Malaysia Police
- President: Ashaari Baidawi
- Head coach: Zulkhairi Mohd Zabidi

PULAPOL Football Club is a Malaysian amateur football club owned by the Royal Malaysia Police (PDRM) and based at the Police Training Centre (PULAPOL) on Jalan Semarak, Kuala Lumpur. Nicknamed "The Cops II", the club operates as a developmental and institutional side alongside the police force's flagship professional team, PDRM FC.

== History ==
While the Police Training Centre in Kuala Lumpur has operated since 1904, its representative football team began competing regularly in local Kuala Lumpur state competitions in the late 2010s. The team finished as runners-up in both the KLFA Premier League (Division 1) and the KLFA Cup during the 2017–18 season.

In 2019, the club was formally established as Semarak FC, named after its Jalan Semarak base. Under this name, the club entered the third-tier Liga M3 in 2020 and made its national cup debut in the 2020 Malaysia FA Cup preliminary round, losing 1–0 to Gamestop FC. Their 2020 league campaign was subsequently cut short when the season was abandoned due to the COVID-19 pandemic in Malaysia.

In 2022, the club rebranded as PULAPOL FC to reflect its direct institutional identity. That same year, the team won the KLFA Super League title.

== Ground ==
PULAPOL FC plays its home matches at the Police Training Centre Football Arena (Padang PULAPOL) in Kuala Lumpur. The facility is also regularly utilized by visiting domestic clubs for pre-season training and friendly matches.

== Crest ==
2019–2022

== Season by season record ==
Season	Division	Position	Malaysia Cup	Malaysian FA Cup	Malaysian Charity Shield	Regional	Top Scorer (All Competitions)
2020^{1}	Liga M3	Season abandoned	DNQ	Preliminary round	–	–	None

Notes:'

^1 2020 Season cancelled due to the COVID-19 pandemic, no promotion or league title was awarded.

== Honours ==
=== League ===
- KLFA Super League
  - Champions (1): 2022
  - Runners-up (2): 2024–25, 2026
- KLFA Premier League (Division 1)
  - Runners-up (1): 2017–18

=== Cup ===
- KLFA Cup
  - Runners-up (2): 2017–18, 2024–25

== Affiliated clubs ==
- Royal Malaysian Police Football Association
- Polis Diraja Malaysia FC
