= Sungai Merab F.C. =

Malaysian football club

Sungai Merab
- Full name: Sungai Merab Football Club
- Short name: SMFC
- Founded: 2014
- Ground: Sepang Municipal Council Stadium
- Capacity: 1,000
- Head coach: Azman bin Jaafar
- League: Malaysia A2 Amateur League
- 2025–26: 4th (Central Zone)
Home colours	Away colours

Sungai Merab Football Club (officially Sg. Merab FC, formerly MOF–Sungai Merab FC) is a Malaysian football club based in Sungai Merab, Sepang, Selangor, competing in the Malaysia A2 Amateur League, the third tier of the Malaysian football league system. They play their home matches at the 3,000-capacity Sepang Municipal Council Stadium.

== History ==
Founded in 2014 as a local community side in Kampung Sungai Merab, playing in regional Klang Valley and youth circuits. Finished runners-up in the Kuala Lumpur FA Cup (2022) and Liga M5 Putrajaya (2023). They subsequently won the Putrajaya A3 Community League in 2024–25 finishing as runners-up after a narrow 2–1 defeat to SJ Virtuosos and to earn national promotion.

Sungai Merab FC gained wider attention in 2023, when they reached the final of the Liga M5 Putrajaya, In the 2024–25 season, the club competed in the Putrajaya A3 Community League, becoming champions and securing promotion to the 2025–26 Malaysia A2 Amateur League.

=== Rebranding & privatisation ===
The club partnered with the Ministry of Finance and rebranded as MOF–Sungai Merab FC for the 2025–26 season under coach Azman Bin Jaafar. Ahead of 2026–27, league governance rules led to dropping the ministerial prefix, returning to Sungai Merab FC.

Crest of MOF-Sungai Merab FC (2025–2026)

== Players ==
=== Current squad ===
As of 13 November 2026

Note: Flags indicate national team as defined under FIFA eligibility rules; some limited exceptions apply. Players may hold more than one non-FIFA nationality.

No.	Pos.	Nation	Player
1	GK	MAS	Hadif Padil Ali (captain)
2	DF	MAS	Adam Iskandar Zaidi
3	DF	MAS	Mohd Akmal Chin
4	DF	MAS	Danish Aiman Onn
5	MF	MAS	Anuar Mohd Zulkifli
6	DF	MAS	Karl Iskandar
8	FW	MAS	Naim Zaini Azman
9	FW	MAS	Akmal Ahmad Ruzaini
10	FW	MAS	Muhammad Hakim Zainal
11	MF	MAS	Asyraf Masnon
12	FW	MAS	Danish Ilham Jainol
13	DF	MAS	Akmal Hakim Endri
15	DF	MAS	David Baran Bedul
16	DF	MAS	Affiq Amirul Jamaludin
18	MF	MAS	Anwar Khairuddin
19	MF	MAS	Affiq Amsyar Jamaludin

No.	Pos.	Nation	Player
20	GK	MAS	Aiman Mohd Nasir
22	FW	MAS	Faris Syazwan Mohd
23	DF	MAS	Elman Abid Hasmandin
24	DF	MAS	Harith Imran Jumat
25	MF	MAS	Ammar Aqil Azlee
26	DF	MAS	Firdaus Che Awang
27	FW	MAS	Ameer Nur Iman Aminuddin
28	FW	MAS	Thiruchelvan a/l Arumugam
29	MF	MAS	Harith Rofaie
30	GK	MAS	Aznil Azman
32	DF	MAS	Fareez Najmi Fuad
33	DF	MAS	Wafie Othman
41	MF	MAS	Umar Faisal Azami
71	MF	MAS	Hafizuddin Mohd Rafi

== Management ==
As of November 2026

Position	Name
Team manager	(Malaysia) Feroz Khan bin Karam Khan
Head coach	(Malaysia) Azman bin Jaafar
Assistant coach	(Malaysia) Ahmad Faizon bin Bakar
Goalkeeper coach	(Malaysia) Faizal bin Hashim
Fitness coach	(Malaysia) Muhammad Hariz Faisal bin Mhd Razif
Physio	(Malaysia) Mohamad Shawaffi bin Ahmad

== Honours ==
=== Domestic ===
League

- Putrajaya A3 Community League
  - Champions (1): 2024–25
  - Runners-up (2): 2023, 2025–26

Cup

- KLFA FA Cup
  - Runners-up (1): 2022

== See also ==
- Football in Malaysia
